= 2020–21 FC Chambly Oise season =

Chambly
2020–21 season
- President: Fulvio Luzi
- Manager: Bruno Luzi
- Stadium: Stade Pierre Brisson
- Ligue 2: 19th (relegated)
- Coupe de France: Eighth round
Home colours	Away colours	Third colours

The 2020–21 FC Chambly Oise season was the club's 31st season in existence and its second consecutive season in the second division of French football. In addition to the domestic league, Chambly participated in this season's edition of the Coupe de France. The season covered the period from 1 July 2020 to 30 June 2021.

== Players ==
=== First-team squad ===
As of 13 November 2019.

Note: Flags indicate national team as defined under FIFA eligibility rules; some limited exceptions apply. Players may hold more than one non-FIFA nationality.

No.	Pos.	Nation	Player
1	GK	FRA	Xavier Pinoteau
3	DF	FRA	Aniss El Hriti (on loan from Dudelange)
4	MF	FRA	Sébastien Flochon
5	DF	FRA	Thibault Jaques (captain)
6	MF	FRA	Joachim Eickmayer
7	FW	FRA	Lassana Doucouré
8	MF	FRA	Romain Padovani
9	FW	FRA	Mehdy Guezoui
10	MF	FRA	Guillaume Heinry
11	DF	GUF	Anthony Soubervie
12	MF	FRA	Mickaël Latour
13	FW	GLP	Florian David
14	FW	FRA	Marvin Geran
15	MF	FRA	Marvin Martin
16	GK	FRA	Killian Le Roy
17	DF	FRA	Romain Fleurier

No.	Pos.	Nation	Player
18	DF	FRA	Shaquil Delos
19	DF	FRA	Florian Pinteaux
20	FW	FRA	Benjamin Santelli
21	DF	FRA	Judicaël Crillon
22	FW	MKD	Vlatko Stojanovski (on loan from Nîmes)
23	DF	FRA	Guillaume Dequaire
24	MF	FRA	John Popelard
25	DF	CMR	Oumar Gonzalez
26	MF	FRA	Laurent Héloïse
27	DF	FRA	Diaranké Fofana
28	MF	FRA	Jonathan Beaulieu
29	DF	FRA	Maxence Derrien
30	GK	FRA	Simon Pontdemé
31	FW	GLP	Yannick Mamilonne
32	FW	FRA	Joris Correa (on loan from Orléans)
34	MF	FRA	Jayson Papeau (on loan from Amiens)

== Transfers ==
=== In ===
No.	Pos	Player	Transferred from	Fee	Date	Source
15			TBD		1 July 2020	

=== Out ===
No.	Pos	Player	Transferred to	Fee	Date	Source
15			TBD		1 July 2020	

=== Loan in ===
Date from	Date to	Pos.	Name	From
21 August 2020	30 June 2021	FW	(North Macedonia) Vlatko Stojanovski	(France) Nîmes

== Pre-season and friendlies ==
Win Draw Loss

11 July 2020 Friendly	Chambly (France)	1–1	(France) Boulogne	Gouvieux, France
--:-- CEST (UTC+2)				Stadium: Stade Municipal Paul Bourne

18 July 2020 Friendly	Chambly (France)	4–0	(France) Beauvais	Gouvieux, France
--:-- CEST (UTC+2)				Stadium: Stade Municipal Paul Bourne

22 July 2020 Friendly	Chambly (France)	Cancelled	(France) Lens	Chambly, France
17:00 CEST (UTC+2)				Stadium: Stade des Marais

24 July 2020 Friendly	Dunkerque (France)	1–1	(France) Chambly	Loon-Plage, France
--:-- CEST (UTC+2)				Stadium: Stade Marcel Rosseel - Terrain 1

1 August 2020 Friendly	Amiens (France)	0–0	(France) Chambly	Amiens, France
19:00 CEST (UTC+2)				Stadium: Stade de la Licorne

5 August 2020 Friendly	Chambly (France)	0–1	(France) Laval	Gouvieux, France
18:00 CEST (UTC+2)				Stadium: Stade Municipal Paul Bourne

8 August 2020 Friendly	Chambly (France)	2–2	(France) Red Star	Aix-en-Provence, France
9:30 CEST (UTC+2)				Stadium: Georges-Carcassonne Stadium

14 August 2020 Friendly	Paris FC (France)	Cancelled	(France) Chambly	Paris, France
19:00 CEST (UTC+2)				Stadium: Stade Sébastien Charléty

15 August 2020 Friendly	Lens (France)	Cancelled	(France) Chambly	Lens, France
14:00 CEST (UTC+2)				Stadium: Stade Bollaert-Delelis

4 September 2020 Friendly	Guingamp (France)	Cancelled	(France) Chambly	France
15:00 CEST (UTC+2)

9 October 2020 Friendly	Chambly (France)	1–1	(France) Amiens	Chambly, France
15:30 CEST (UTC+2)	Šušnjara 72'		Konaté 75' (pen.)	Stadium: Stade des Marais

== Competitions ==
=== Overview ===
Competition	First match	Last match	Starting round	Final position	Record							
Competition	First match	Last match	Starting round	Final position	Pld	W	D	L	GF	GA	GD	Win %
Ligue 2	22 August 2020	23 May 2021	Matchday 1		38	9	11	18	41	64	−23	23.68
Coupe de France	19 January 2021		Eighth round	Eighth round	1	0	0	1	0	2	−2	0.00
Total					39	9	11	19	41	66	−25	23.08

Source: Soccerway

=== Ligue 2 ===
==== League table ====
Pos	Team	Pld	W	D	L	GF	GA	GD	Pts	Promotion or Relegation
16	Dunkerque	38	10	11	17	34	47	−13	41	
17	Caen	38	9	14	15	34	49	−15	41	
18	Niort (O)	38	9	14	15	34	58	−24	41	Qualification for the relegation play-offs
19	Chambly (R)	38	9	11	18	41	64	−23	38	Relegation to Championnat National
20	Châteauroux (R)	38	4	11	23	32	58	−26	23	Relegation to Championnat National

Source: Ligue 2
Rules for classification: 1) Points; 2) Goal difference; 3) Number of goals scored; 4) Head-to-head goal difference; 5) Fair play points
(O) Play-off winners; (R) Relegated

==== Results summary ====
Overall								Home						Away					
Pld	W	D	L	GF	GA	GD	Pts	W	D	L	GF	GA	GD	W	D	L	GF	GA	GD
38	9	11	18	41	64	−23	38	7	3	9	21	27	−6	2	8	9	20	37	−17

Source: Ligue 2

==== Results by round ====
Round	1	2	3	4	5	6	7	8	9	10	11	12	13	14	15	16	17	18	19	20	21	22	23	24	25	26	27	28	29	30	31	32	33	34	35	36	37	38
Ground	H	A	H	A	H	A	H	A	H	A	H	A	H	H	A	H	A	H	A	A	H	H	A	H	A	H	A	H	A	H	A	A	H	A	H	A	H	A
Result	L	D	L	D	W	L	L	L	L	D	D	D	W	L	D	W	D	L	W	L	D	W	L	L	L	L	D	L	L	W	D	L	W	L	D	W	W	L
Position	19	17	18	18	16	18	18	18	18	18	18	18	18	18	18	18	18	18	18	18	18	18	18	18	18	18	19	19	19	19	19	19	19	19	19	19	19	19

Source: Ligue 2
A = Away; H = Home; W = Win; D = Draw; L = Loss

==== Matches ====
The league fixtures were announced on 9 July 2020.

22 August 2020 1	Chambly	0–3	Paris FC	Beauvais
19:00 CEST (UTC+2)		Report	Laura 9'; Martin 73', 90+6'	Stadium: Stade Pierre Brisson; Referee: Gaël Angoula

29 August 2020 2	Niort	1–1	Chambly	Niort
19:00 CEST (UTC+2)	Baroan 84'	Report	Jaques 42' (pen.)	Stadium: Stade René Gaillard; Referee: Bartolomeu Varela

12 September 2020 3	Chambly	1–2	Grenoble	Beauvais
19:00 CEST (UTC+2)	Guezoui 10'	Report	Anani 73'; Ondaan 90'	Stadium: Stade Pierre Brisson; Referee: Mathieu Vernice

19 September 2020 4	Caen	0–0	Chambly	Caen
19:00 CEST (UTC+2)		Report		Stadium: Stade Michel d'Ornano; Attendance: 5,593; Referee: Romain Lissorgue

26 September 2020 5	Chambly	2–1	Châteauroux	Beauvais
19:00 CEST (UTC+2)	Jaques 53'; Correa 76'	Report	Keny 45+2'	Stadium: Stade Pierre Brisson; Attendance: 1,338; Referee: Abdelatif Kherradji

3 October 2020 6	Sochaux	3–2	Chambly	Montbéliard
19:00 CEST (UTC+2)	Weissbeck 24', 48'; Lopy (yellow card) 50'; Ambri (yellow card) 70'; Niane 89'	Report	Correa 8'; Flochon (yellow card) 34'; Šušnjara (yellow card) 47'; Beaulieu (yellow card) 84'; Danger 88'	Stadium: Stade Auguste Bonal; Referee: Arnaud Baert

16 October 2020 7	Chambly	0–3	Clermont	Beauvais
19:00 CEST (UTC+2)	Soubervie (yellow card) 65'	Report	Berthomier 12'; Magnin (yellow card) 28'; Bayo 43'; Allevinah 63'	Stadium: Stade Pierre Brisson; Referee: Guillaume Paradis

24 October 2020 8	Auxerre	4–0	Chambly	Auxerre
19:00 CEST (UTC+2)	Le Bihan 17', 29', 49'; Bernard (yellow card) 19'; Duigmont 20'	Report		Stadium: Stade de l'Abbé-Deschamps; Referee: Rémi Landry

31 October 2020 9	Chambly	0–1	Dunkerque	Beauvais
20:00 CET (UTC+1)	Stojanovski (yellow card) 21'; Beaulieu (yellow card) 43'; Soubervie (yellow card) 59'; Derrien (yellow card) 67'	Report	Goteni (yellow card) 16'; Dudouit (yellow card) 26', (goal) 58' (pen.); Sy (yellow card) 42'; Kerrouche (yellow card) 45+1'	Stadium: Stade Pierre Brisson; Referee: Bartolomeu Varela

7 November 2020 10	Troyes	2–2	Chambly	Troyes
19:00 CET (UTC+1)	Gory 2'; Touzghar 44'; El Hajjam (yellow card) 66'; Tardieu (yellow card) 73'; Barthelmé (yellow card) 85'	Report	Correa 25', (yellow card) 73'; David (yellow card) 32'; Pontdemé (red card) 54'; Doucouré 81'; Heinry (yellow card) 88'	Stadium: Stade de l'Aube; Referee: Alexandre Perreau Niel

21 November 2020 11	Chambly	1–1	Toulouse	Beauvais
19:00 CET (UTC+1)	David (yellow card) 19'; Doucouré 74'	Report	Koné (yellow card) 31'; Antiste 56'; Rouault (yellow card) 63' van den Boomen (yellow card) 65'; Amian (yellow card) 86'	Stadium: Stade Pierre Brisson; Referee: Romain Lissorgue

28 November 2020 12	Ajaccio	0–0	Chambly	Ajaccio
19:00 CET (UTC+1)	Moussiti-Oko (yellow card) 7'; Youssouf (yellow card) 46'; Nouri (yellow card) 66'; El Idrissy (yellow card) 90+6'	Report	Gonzalez (red card) 63'; Correa (yellow card) 90+2'	Stadium: Stade François Coty; Referee: Thomas Léonard

1 December 2020 13	Chambly	1–0	Rodez	Beauvais
19:00 CET (UTC+1)	Correa 59'; Guezoui (yellow card) 69'; Eickmayer (yellow card) 90+3'	Report	Dembélé (yellow card) 18'; Boissier (yellow card) 20'; Bardy (yellow card) 31'; Henry (yellow card) 52'; Ouammou (red card) 90+5'	Stadium: Stade Pierre Brisson; Referee: Thomas Léonard

5 December 2020 14	Chambly	1–2	Valenciennes	Beauvais
19:00 CET (UTC+1)	Correa 35'; Guezoui (yellow card) 65'	Report	Guillaume 66'; Cabral 87'; Pellenard (yellow card) 90+4'	Stadium: Stade Pierre Brisson; Referee: Romain Delpech

12 December 2020 15	Amiens	1–1	Chambly	Amiens
19:00 CET (UTC+1)	Timité (yellow card) 27'; Ciss 90+4'	Report	Guezoui 11'; Danger (yellow card) 22'; Soubervie (yellow card) 62'	Stadium: Stade de la Licorne; Referee: Stéphanie Frappart

18 December 2020 16	Chambly	3–0	Guingamp	Beauvais
20:00 CET (UTC+1)	Jaques 21' (pen.); El Hriti (yellow card) 37'; Derrien (red card) 58'; Heinry 63'; Pinoteau (yellow card) 68'; Delos 84'	Report	Romao (yellow card) 36'; Sorbon (yellow card) 46'; Palun (yellow card) 48'	Stadium: Stade Pierre Brisson; Referee: Nicolas Rainville

22 December 2020 17	Nancy	3–3	Chambly	Nancy
20:00 CET (UTC+1)	Bondo 11'; Lefebvre (yellow card) 37'; Triboulet 74'; Haag 81'; Barka (yellow card) 83'	Report	Gonzalez 18'; Danger (yellow card) 32'; Camelo (yellow card) 44'; Heinry 56', 90'	Stadium: Stade Marcel Picot; Referee: Karim Abed

5 January 2021 18	Chambly	0–1	Le Havre	Beauvais
20:00 CET (UTC+1)	Soubervie (yellow card) 34'; Gonzalez (yellow card) 56'	Report	Meraş (yellow card) 69'; Abdelli 80' (pen.)	Stadium: Stade Pierre Brisson; Referee: Romain Lissorgue

8 January 2021 19	Pau	1–3	Chambly	Pau
20:00 CET (UTC+1)	Scaramozzino (yellow card) 19'; Zahary 61'; Kouassi (yellow card) 64'	Report	Guezoui 5', 68'; Correa 47'	Stadium: Stade du Hameau; Referee: Aurélien Petit

23 January 2021 21	Grenoble	2–0	Chambly	Grenoble
19:00 CET (UTC+2)	Straalman (yellow card) 39'; Monfray (yellow card) 51'; Ravet 68'; Anani 90+1'	Report	Gonzalez (yellow card) 42'; Derrien (yellow card) 67'; Camelo (yellow card) 74'	Stadium: Stade des Alpes; Referee: Pierre Gaillouste

27 January 2021 20	Chambly	1–1	Niort	Beauvais
19:00 CET (UTC+1)	Correa (yellow card) 41'; Derrien 89'	Report	Conté (yellow card) 15'; Passi 29'; Yongwa (yellow card) 67'; Bourhane (red card) 88'	Stadium: Stade Pierre Brisson; Referee: Sylvain Palhies
Note: The match originally scheduled for 16 January 2021, was postponed due to heavy snowfall.

30 January 2021 22	Chambly	4–2	Caen	Chambly
19:00 CET (UTC+1)	Eickmayer 25'; Badu 27'; Soubervie (yellow card) 39' (yellow-red card) 85'; Doucouré (yellow card) 52', (goal) 67'; Guezoui 60' (pen.)	Report	Zady 2'; Gioacchini (red card) 32'; Deminguet 90+2'	Stadium: Stade des Marais; Referee: Bartolomeu Varela Teles

2 February 2021 23	Châteauroux	4–0	Chambly	Châteauroux
20:00 CET (UTC+1)	Mulumba (yellow card) 47'; Ibara (yellow card) 52'; Grange 55' (pen.); S. Doucouré 72', 88'; Merdji 85'	Report	Derrien (red card) 44'; Pinot (yellow card) 54'; Heinry (yellow card) 67'	Stadium: Stade Gaston Petit; Referee: Arnaud Baert

5 February 2021 24	Chambly	1–4	Sochaux	Chambly
20:00 CET (UTC+1)	El Hriti (yellow card) 11'; Lopy 35' (o.g.); Guezoui (yellow card) 57'	Report	Ndour (yellow card) 42'; Lasme 47'; Kaabouni (yellow card) 51'; Virginius 54', 60'; Bedia 89'	Stadium: Stade des Marais; Referee: Mathieu Vernice

13 February 2021 25	Clermont	1–0	Chambly	Clermont-Ferrand
19:00 (CET) (UTC+1)	Bayo (yellow card) 45', (goal) 61'; Hountondji (yellow card) 90+1'	Report	Schacherer (yellow card) 83' (yellow-red card) 86'; Jaques (yellow card) 85'	Stadium: Stade Gabriel Montpied; Referee: Benjamin Lepaysant

20 February 2021 26	Chambly	0–1	Auxerre	Chambly
19:00 CET (UTC+1)	Callegari (yellow card) 56'; Le Roy (yellow card) 69'; Soubervie (yellow card) 77'; Jaques (yellow card) 77'	Report	Arcus (yellow card) 43'; Dugimont 70' (pen.); Lloris (yellow card) 74'; Touré (yellow card) 78'	Stadium: Stade des Marais; Referee: Mikael Lesage

27 February 2021 27	Dunkerque	1–1	Chambly	Dunkerque
19:00 CET (UTC+1)	Diarra 52'	Report	Callegari (yellow card) 30'; Dequaire 62'; Correa (yellow card) 81'	Stadium: Stade Marcel-Tribut; Referee: Pierre Gaillouste

2 March 2021 28	Chambly	0–3	Troyes	Chambly
20:00 CET (UTC+1)	Danger (red card) 38'; Derrien (yellow card) 47'	Report	El Hajjam (yellow card) 27'; Touzghar 40'; Raveloson (yellow card) 48'; Bozok 42' (pen.); Giraudon (yellow card) 76'; Domingues 87'	Stadium: Stade des Marais; Referee: Sylvain Palhies

13 March 2021 29	Toulouse	4–0	Chambly	Toulouse
20:00 CET (UTC+1)	Machado (yellow card) 26' van den Boomen 56'; Amian 68'; Koné 79'; Bayo 86'	Report	Camelo (yellow card) 30'	Stadium: Stade Auguste Bonal; Referee: Guillaume Paradis

19 March 2021 30	Chambly	2–1	Ajaccio	Chambly
19:00 CET (UTC+1)	Badu 52'; Danger 57'	Report	Laçi (yellow card) 44'; Courtet 64'	Stadium: Stade des Marais; Referee: Johan Hamel

3 April 2021 31	Rodez	2–2	Chambly	Rodez
20:00 CEST (UTC+2)	Bonnet 33'; El Hriti 40' (o.g.); Boissier (penalty missed) 62'; Célestine (yellow card) 70'	Report	Soubervie 13' (pen.); Delos 68'; Callegari (yellow card) 72'; Eickmayer (yellow card) 78'	Stadium: Stade Paul-Lignon; Referee: Sylvain Palhies

10 April 2021 32	Valenciennes	2–1	Chambly	Valenciennes
20:00 CET (UTC+1)	Linguet 10'; Elogo 54'; Kankava (yellow card) 71'	Report	Delos 6'; Callegari (red card) 31'; Soubervie (yellow card) 51'; Eickmayer (yellow card) 59'; Derrien (yellow card) 61'; Guezoui (yellow card) 89' (yellow-red card) 89'	Stadium: Stade du Hainaut; Referee: Thomas Léonard

17 April 2021 33	Chambly	2–0	Amiens	Chambly
20:00 CEST (UTC+2)	Heinry (yellow card) 17'; Soubervie (yellow card) 22'; Petković 31'; Correa (yellow card) 44'; Doucouré 45+4'	Report	Blin (yellow card) 31'; Lachuer (yellow card) 38'; Alphonse (yellow card) 58'	Stadium: Stade des Marais; Referee: Arnaud Baert

20 April 2021 34	Guingamp	1–0	Chambly	Guingamp
20:00 CEST (UTC+2)	Fofana (yellow card) 38'; Rodelin 90+2'	Report	Camelo (yellow card) 51'	Stadium: Stade de Roudourou; Referee: Mehdi Mokhtari

24 April 2021 35	Chambly	1–1	Nancy	Chambly
20:00 CEST (UTC+2)	Gonzalez (yellow card) 22'; Correa 55' (pen.); Camelo (yellow card) 68'	Report	Bassi (yellow card) 41'; Wooh (yellow card) 50'; Triboulet 75'	Stadium: Stade des Marais; Referee: Gaël Angoula

1 May 2021 36	Le Havre	2–4	Chambly	Le Havre
20:00 CET (UTC+1)	Bonnet (yellow card) 10', (goal) 20' (pen.); Mayembo (yellow card) 40'; Basque (yellow card) 44'; Cornette (yellow card) 73', (goal) 78'	Report	Derrien (yellow card) 30'; Petković 51', 87'; Correa 62' (pen.); Camelo 68', (yellow card) 76'; Gonzalez (yellow card) 77'	Stadium: Stade Océane; Referee: Nicolas Rainville

8 May 2021 37	Chambly	1–0	Pau	Chambly
20:00 CEST (UTC+2)	Correa 22' (pen.); Delos (yellow card) 81'	Report	George (yellow card) 18'; Batisse (yellow card) 21'; Beusnard (yellow card) 87'	Stadium: Stade des Marais; Referee: Bartolomeu Varela Teles

15 May 2021 38	Paris FC	3–0	Chambly	Paris
20:00 CEST (UTC+2)	Abdi (yellow card) 51', (goal) 89'; Mandouki 57'; Belaud (yellow card) 67'; Diaby-Fadiga (yellow card) 83'; López 90+4'	Report	Danger (yellow card) 44'; Dequaire (yellow card) 76' (yellow-red card) 79'	Stadium: Stade Sébastien Charléty; Referee: Jérôme Miguelgorry

=== Coupe de France ===
19 January 2021 Eighth round	Valenciennes	2–0	Chambly	Valenciennes
18:00 CET (UTC+1)	Cabral 8'; Guillaume 17' (pen.); Konaté (yellow card) 63'; Linguet (yellow card) 67'	Report	Camelo (yellow card) 15'; Beaulieu (yellow card) 70'	Stadium: Stade du Hainaut; Attendance: 0 Referee: Mehdi Mokhtari
