= List of French football transfers winter 2019–20 =

This is a list of French football transfers for the 2019–20 winter transfer window. Only transfers featuring Ligue 1 and Ligue 2 are listed.

== Ligue 1 ==
Note: Flags indicate national team as has been defined under FIFA eligibility rules. Players may hold more than one non-FIFA nationality.

=== Paris Saint-Germain ===
In:

No.	Pos.	Nation	Player

Out:

No.	Pos.	Nation	Player

=== Lille ===
In:

No.	Pos.	Nation	Player
20	MF	ARG	Nicolás Gaitán (from (United States) Chicago Fire)

Out:

No.	Pos.	Nation	Player
5	DF	FRA	Adama Soumaoro (on loan to (Italy) Genoa)
20	MF	BRA	Thiago Maia (on loan to (Brazil) Flamengo)
—	MF	MLI	Rominigue Kouamé (on loan to Troyes, previously on loan at (Belgium) Cercle Brugge)
—	MF	ALG	Yassine Benzia (to Dijon, previously on loan at (Greece) Olympiacos)

=== Lyon ===
In:

No.	Pos.	Nation	Player
21	FW	CMR	Karl Toko Ekambi (on loan from (Spain) Villarreal)
29	MF	FRA	Lucas Tousart (on loan from (Germany) Hertha BSC)
39	MF	BRA	Bruno Guimarães (from (Brazil) Athletico Paranaense)
—	MF	BRA	Camilo (from (Brazil) Ponte Preta)
—	FW	ZIM	Tino Kadewere (from Le Havre)

Out:

No.	Pos.	Nation	Player
29	MF	FRA	Lucas Tousart (to (Germany) Hertha BSC)
—	FW	ZIM	Tino Kadewere (on loan to Le Havre)

=== Saint-Étienne ===
In:

No.	Pos.	Nation	Player
27	DF	GLP	Yvann Maçon (from Dunkerque)

Out:

No.	Pos.	Nation	Player
2	DF	CMR	Harold Moukoudi (on loan to (England) Middlesbrough)
19	DF	FRA	Alpha Sissoko (on loan to Puy Foot)
27	FW	SVN	Robert Berić (to (United States) Chicago Fire)

=== Marseille ===
In:

No.	Pos.	Nation	Player

Out:

No.	Pos.	Nation	Player

=== Montpellier ===
In:

No.	Pos.	Nation	Player
24	FW	KOR	Yun Il-lok (from (Japan) Yokohama F. Marinos, previously on loan at (South Korea) Jeju United)

Out:

No.	Pos.	Nation	Player
22	DF	URU	Mathías Suárez (on loan to (Uruguay) Nacional)
28	FW	FRA	Bastian Badu (on loan to Chambly)
32	FW	SRB	Petar Škuletić (on loan to (Turkey) Sivasspor)

=== Nice ===
In:

No.	Pos.	Nation	Player
5	DF	DEN	Riza Durmisi (on loan from (Italy) Lazio)
6	DF	SEN	Moussa Wagué (on loan from (Spain) Barcelona)
—	FW	SUI	Dan Ndoye (from (Switzerland) Lausanne-Sport)

Out:

No.	Pos.	Nation	Player
5	MF	FRA	Adrien Tameze (on loan to (Italy) Atalanta)
6	MF	FRA	Rémi Walter (to (Turkey) Yeni Malatyaspor)
11	MF	TUN	Bassem Srarfi (to (Belgium) Zulte Waregem)
12	DF	SEN	Racine Coly (on loan to (Portugal) Famalicão)
33	FW	FRA	Lamine Diaby-Fadiga (to Paris)
—	FW	SUI	Dan Ndoye (on loan to (Switzerland) Lausanne-Sport)

=== Reims ===
In:

No.	Pos.	Nation	Player
10	FW	NED	Kaj Sierhuis (from (Netherlands) Jong Ajax, previously on loan at (Netherlands) Groningen)
—	DF	BEL	Wout Faes (from (Belgium) Oostende)

Out:

No.	Pos.	Nation	Player
10	FW	KOR	Suk Hyun-jun (to Troyes)
18	FW	FRA	Rémi Oudin (to Bordeaux)
—	DF	BEL	Wout Faes (on loan to (Belgium) Oostende)

=== Nîmes ===
In:

No.	Pos.	Nation	Player
22	MF	MAR	Yassine Benrahou (on loan from Bordeaux)
25	FW	FRA	Nolan Roux (from Guingamp)
28	FW	SEN	Moussa Koné (from (Germany) Dynamo Dresden)

Out:

No.	Pos.	Nation	Player
3	DF	FRA	Théo Sainte-Luce (on loan to Gazélec)

=== Rennes ===
In:

No.	Pos.	Nation	Player
25	MF	FRA	Steven Nzonzi (on loan from (Italy) Roma, previously on loan at (Turkey) Galatasaray)
40	GK	COD	Riffi Mandanda (from Boulogne)

Out:

No.	Pos.	Nation	Player
5	DF	CIV	Souleyman Doumbia (on loan to Angers)
25	FW	SEN	Diafra Sakho (released)

=== Strasbourg ===
In:

No.	Pos.	Nation	Player
8	FW	GHA	Majeed Waris (on loan from (Portugal) Porto B)
—	MF	FRA	Mehdi Chahiri (from Red Star)

Out:

No.	Pos.	Nation	Player
7	MF	TUN	Moataz Zemzemi (on loan to (Tunisia) Club Africain)
22	MF	FRA	Youssouf Fofana (to Monaco)
29	FW	CPV	Nuno da Costa (to (England) Nottingham Forest)
—	MF	FRA	Mehdi Chahiri (on loan to Red Star)

=== Nantes ===
In:

No.	Pos.	Nation	Player
28	FW	BEL	Renaud Emond (from (Belgium) Standard Liège)

Out:

No.	Pos.	Nation	Player
5	MF	BEL	Joris Kayembe (to (Belgium) Charleroi)

=== Angers ===
In:

No.	Pos.	Nation	Player
3	DF	CIV	Souleyman Doumbia (on loan from Rennes)

Out:

No.	Pos.	Nation	Player
3	DF	FRA	Ibrahim Cissé (on loan to Paris)
6	MF	FRA	Vincent Pajot (on loan to Metz)
—	GK	FRA	Alexandre Letellier (to Orléans, previously on loan at (Norway) Sarpsborg 08)

=== Bordeaux ===
In:

No.	Pos.	Nation	Player
8	MF	ESP	Rubén Pardo (from (Spain) Real Sociedad)
28	FW	FRA	Rémi Oudin (from Reims)

Out:

No.	Pos.	Nation	Player
2	DF	ITA	Raoul Bellanova (on loan to (Italy) Atalanta)
8	MF	FRA	Aurélien Tchouaméni (to Monaco)
22	MF	MAR	Yassine Benrahou (on loan to Nîmes)
42	FW	BRA	Jonathan Cafú (to (Saudi Arabia) Al-Hazem)

=== Amiens ===
In:

No.	Pos.	Nation	Player
4	DF	GHA	Nicholas Opoku (on loan from (Italy) Udinese)
21	FW	BEL	Isaac Mbenza (on loan from (England) Huddersfield Town)

Out:

No.	Pos.	Nation	Player
21	MF	POL	Rafał Kurzawa (on loan to (Denmark) Esbjerg)
25	DF	FRA	Jordan Lefort (on loan to (Switzerland) Young Boys)
36	MF	FRA	Jayson Papeau (on loan to Chambly)

=== Toulouse ===
In:

No.	Pos.	Nation	Player
4	DF	NOR	Ruben Gabrielsen (from (Norway) Molde)
40	GK	CRO	Lovre Kalinić (on loan from (England) Aston Villa)

Out:

No.	Pos.	Nation	Player
3	DF	JPN	Gen Shoji (to (Japan) Gamba Osaka)
8	FW	FRA	Corentin Jean (on loan to Lens)

=== Monaco ===
In:

No.	Pos.	Nation	Player
15	DF	FRA	Jean Marcelin (from Auxerre)
22	MF	FRA	Youssouf Fofana (from Strasbourg)
24	MF	FRA	Aurélien Tchouaméni (from Bordeaux)
—	GK	POL	Radosław Majecki (from (Poland) Legia Warsaw)
—	DF	SRB	Strahinja Pavlović (from (Serbia) Partizan)

Out:

No.	Pos.	Nation	Player
7	FW	NGA	Henry Onyekuru (on loan to (Turkey) Galatasaray)
11	FW	FRA	Jean-Kévin Augustin (loan return to (Germany) RB Leipzig)
26	MF	BRA	Gabriel Boschilia (to (Brazil) Internacional)
27	DF	BRA	Naldo (released)
31	MF	POR	Gil Dias (on loan to (Spain) Granada)
—	GK	POL	Radosław Majecki (on loan to (Poland) Legia Warsaw)
—	DF	SRB	Strahinja Pavlović (on loan to (Serbia) Partizan)
—	FW	ESP	Jordi Mboula (on loan to (Spain) Huesca, previously on loan at (Belgium) Cercle Brugge)

=== Dijon ===
In:

No.	Pos.	Nation	Player
10	MF	ALG	Yassine Benzia (from Lille, previously on loan at (Greece) Olympiacos)
—	FW	FRA	Aurélien Scheidler (from Orléans)

Out:

No.	Pos.	Nation	Player
10	MF	BRA	Matheus Pereira (loan return to (Italy) Juventus U23)
12	MF	FRA	Enzo Loiodice (on loan to (England) Wolverhampton Wanderers)
—	FW	FRA	Aurélien Scheidler (on loan to Orléans)

=== Metz ===
In:

No.	Pos.	Nation	Player
2	DF	TUN	Dylan Bronn (from (Belgium) Gent)
14	MF	FRA	Vincent Pajot (on loan from Angers)

Out:

No.	Pos.	Nation	Player
12	FW	MLI	Adama Traoré (on loan to (Saudi Arabia) Al-Adalah)
13	DF	ZAM	Stoppila Sunzu (to (China) Shijiazhuang Ever Bright)
23	FW	SEN	Amadou Dia N'Diaye (on loan to Sochaux)
—	MF	CPV	Jamiro (to (United States) Philadelphia Union, previously on loan)

=== Brest ===
In:

No.	Pos.	Nation	Player
30	GK	FRA	Sébastien Cibois (free agent)

Out:

No.	Pos.	Nation	Player
29	FW	FRA	Derick Osei (on loan to Béziers)
30	GK	FRA	Julien Fabri (to Châteauroux)

== Ligue 2 ==
Note: Flags indicate national team as has been defined under FIFA eligibility rules. Players may hold more than one non-FIFA nationality.

=== Caen ===
In:

No.	Pos.	Nation	Player

Out:

No.	Pos.	Nation	Player
5	MF	GUI	Baïssama Sankoh (released)
7	DF	COD	Arnold Isako (on loan to (Portugal) Farense)
13	FW	FRA	Evens Joseph (on loan to Boulogne)
21	FW	FRA	Brice Tutu (on loan to Bastia)
26	DF	COM	Younn Zahary (on loan to Pau)

=== Guingamp ===
In:

No.	Pos.	Nation	Player

Out:

No.	Pos.	Nation	Player
17	MF	FRA	Mehdi Boudjemaa (on loan to Quevilly-Rouen)
26	FW	FRA	Nolan Roux (to Nîmes)
33	FW	FRA	Matthias Phaeton (on loan to Bastia-Borgo)
—	MF	FRA	Nicolas Benezet (to (United States) Colorado Rapids, previously on loan at (Canada) Toronto)

=== Troyes ===
In:

No.	Pos.	Nation	Player
6	MF	MLI	Rominigue Kouamé (on loan from Lille, previously on loan at (Belgium) Cercle Brugge)
9	FW	KOR	Suk Hyun-jun (from Reims)

Out:

No.	Pos.	Nation	Player

=== Paris ===
In:

No.	Pos.	Nation	Player
28	MF	FRA	Vincent Koziello (on loan from (Germany) 1. FC Köln)
32	DF	BFA	Yacouba Coulibaly (on loan from Le Havre)
36	FW	FRA	Lamine Diaby-Fadiga (from Nice)
38	DF	FRA	Ibrahim Cissé (on loan from Angers)

Out:

No.	Pos.	Nation	Player
4	DF	SRB	Strahinja Tanasijević (loan return to (Italy) Chievo)
8	FW	BIH	Marko Maletić (to (Switzerland) Stade Lausanne Ouchy)
16	GK	GLP	Christopher Dilo (on loan to Cholet)
21	MF	FRA	Jérémy Mangonzo (on loan to Fleury)
24	MF	HAI	Bryan Alceus (on loan to Bastia-Borgo)
34	FW	FRA	Richard Sila (on loan to Andrézieux)
—	MF	FRA	Keelan Lebon (on loan to Créteil, previously on loan at Gazélec)

=== Lens ===
In:

No.	Pos.	Nation	Player
25	FW	FRA	Corentin Jean (on loan from Toulouse)

Out:

No.	Pos.	Nation	Player
8	FW	CMR	Benjamin Moukandjo (to Valenciennes)
10	MF	ALG	Walid Mesloub (to (Qatar) Umm Salal)
19	DF	SEN	Arial Mendy (on loan to Orléans)
—	DF	FRA	Maxence Carlier (to Laval, previously on loan)

=== Lorient ===
In:

No.	Pos.	Nation	Player

Out:

No.	Pos.	Nation	Player
36	DF	FRA	Peter Ouaneh (on loan to Le Puy)
—	MF	FRA	Malcom Edjouma (to (Romania) Viitorul Constanța, previously on loan at Chambly)

=== Le Havre ===
In:

No.	Pos.	Nation	Player
11	FW	ZIM	Tino Kadewere (on loan from Lyon)

Out:

No.	Pos.	Nation	Player
11	FW	ZIM	Tino Kadewere (to Lyon)
15	DF	SEN	Samba Camara (to (United States) New England Revolution)
19	DF	BFA	Yacouba Coulibaly (on loan to Paris)

=== Orléans ===
In:

No.	Pos.	Nation	Player
9	FW	BFA	Préjuce Nakoulma (free agent)
13	FW	FRA	Édouard Butin (free agent)
16	GK	FRA	Alexandre Letellier (from Angers, previously on loan at (Norway) Sarpsborg 08)
18	DF	SEN	Arial Mendy (on loan from Lens)
20	MF	FRA	Yohan Mollo (on loan from (Greece) Panathinaikos)
21	FW	FRA	Aurélien Scheidler (on loan from Dijon)

Out:

No.	Pos.	Nation	Player
20	FW	FRA	Joris Correa (on loan to Chambly)
21	FW	FRA	Aurélien Scheidler (to Dijon)
25	FW	FRA	Fahd El Khoumisti (on loan to Le Puy)

=== Grenoble ===
In:

No.	Pos.	Nation	Player

Out:

No.	Pos.	Nation	Player
26	FW	FRA	Yohan Brun (to Laval)

=== Clermont ===
In:

No.	Pos.	Nation	Player

Out:

No.	Pos.	Nation	Player
8	MF	FRA	Lorenzo Rajot (on loan to Le Mans)
27	MF	FRA	Bryan Teixeira (on loan to Concarneau)
30	GK	ALG	Mehdi Jeannin (to Sochaux)

=== Châteauroux ===
In:

No.	Pos.	Nation	Player
1	GK	FRA	Julien Fabri (from Brest)
18	FW	TOG	Gilles Sunu (from (Turkey) BB Erzurumspor)

Out:

No.	Pos.	Nation	Player
7	FW	FRA	Andrew Jung (on loan to Concarneau)
18	MF	SEN	Fallou Niang (on loan to Le Puy)
29	FW	FRA	Lamine Ghezali (loan return to Saint-Étienne)

=== Niort ===
In:

No.	Pos.	Nation	Player

Out:

No.	Pos.	Nation	Player

=== Valenciennes ===
In:

No.	Pos.	Nation	Player
2	DF	MTN	Aly Abeid (from (Spain) Atlético Levante)
12	FW	CMR	Benjamin Moukandjo (from Lens)

Out:

No.	Pos.	Nation	Player
2	DF	FRA	Baptiste Aloé (to (Belgium) Beerschot)
17	FW	GLP	Jorris Romil (to Dunkerque)

=== Nancy ===
In:

No.	Pos.	Nation	Player

Out:

No.	Pos.	Nation	Player
2	DF	FRA	Mathias Fischer (on loan to Villefranche)
20	MF	FRA	Aurélien Nguiamba (on loan to Gazélec)

=== Auxerre ===
In:

No.	Pos.	Nation	Player

Out:

No.	Pos.	Nation	Player
9	FW	FRA	Yanis Merdji (on loan to Le Mans)
24	DF	FRA	Jean Marcelin (to Monaco)

=== Sochaux ===
In:

No.	Pos.	Nation	Player
1	GK	ALG	Mehdi Jeannin (from Clermont)
17	FW	SEN	Amadou Dia N'Diaye (on loan from Metz)
21	MF	FRA	Melvin Sitti (on loan from (England) Norwich City)

Out:

No.	Pos.	Nation	Player
17	DF	FRA	Rayan Senhadji (on loan to Béziers)
21	MF	FRA	Martin François (on loan to Villefranche)
30	GK	GHA	Lawrence Ati-Zigi (to (Switzerland) St. Gallen)
32	MF	FRA	Isaak Umbdenstock (on loan to Belfort)
33	MF	FRA	Melvin Sitti (to (England) Norwich City)

=== Ajaccio ===
In:

No.	Pos.	Nation	Player

Out:

No.	Pos.	Nation	Player
17	DF	ARM	Gaël Andonian (to Martigues)
24	DF	FRA	Jérémy Choplin (to Le Mans)

=== Rodez ===
In:

No.	Pos.	Nation	Player
2	MF	FRA	Rémy Boissier (on loan from Le Mans)
3	DF	NED	Bart Straalman (from (Norway) Sarpsborg 08)
6	MF	CMR	Alexis Alégué (from Nantes B)

Out:

No.	Pos.	Nation	Player
23	FW	FRA	Boris Mathis (on loan to Villefranche)

=== Chambly ===
In:

No.	Pos.	Nation	Player
14	FW	FRA	Bastian Badu (on loan from Montpellier)
32	FW	FRA	Joris Correa (on loan from Orléans)
34	MF	FRA	Jayson Papeau (on loan from Amiens)

Out:

No.	Pos.	Nation	Player
2	MF	FRA	Malcom Edjouma (loan return to Lorient)
14	FW	FRA	Marvin Geran (to (Italy) Messina)

=== Le Mans ===
In:

No.	Pos.	Nation	Player
13	DF	ALB	Frédéric Veseli (on loan from (Italy) Empoli)
17	FW	FRA	Yanis Merdji (on loan from Auxerre)
21	DF	FRA	Jérémy Choplin (from Ajaccio)
26	MF	FRA	Lorenzo Rajot (on loan from Clermont)

Out:

No.	Pos.	Nation	Player
22	MF	FRA	Rémy Boissier (on loan to Rodez)
33	FW	FRA	Thibault Rambaud (to Vannes)

== See also ==
- 2019–20 Ligue 1
- 2019–20 Ligue 2
