= Boubacari Doucouré =

French footballer (born 1999)

Personal information
- Date of birth: 19 March 1999 (age 27)
- Place of birth: Beaumont-sur-Oise, France
- Height: 1.91 m (6 ft 3 in)
- Position: Centre back

Team information
- Current team: Javor Ivanjica
- Number: 19

Youth career
- 2005–2010: Genay
- 2010–2013: Bord de Saône
- 2013–2017: Villefranche

Senior career*
Years	Team	Apps	(Gls)
2017–2022	Chambly II	40	(5)
2017–2022	Chambly	20	(0)
2021	→ Javor Ivanjica (loan)	18	(0)
2022	TSC	8	(0)
2022–	Javor Ivanjica	131	(9)
- * Club domestic league appearances and goals as of 13 June 2026

Boubacari Doucouré (born 19 March 1999) is a French professional footballer who plays as a defender for Serbian club Javor Ivanjica.

== Career ==
On 8 June 2020, Doucouré signed his first professional contract with Chambly. He made his Ligue 2 debut with the club in a 3–0 loss to Clermont on 16 October 2020. In the second half of the 2020–21 season, Doucouré was loaned out to Javor Ivanjica in Serbia.

== Personal life ==
Born in France, Doucouré is of Malian descent. He is the younger brother of the footballer Lassana Doucouré, who also played with him at Chambly.
