= Marvin Martin =

French footballer (born 1988)

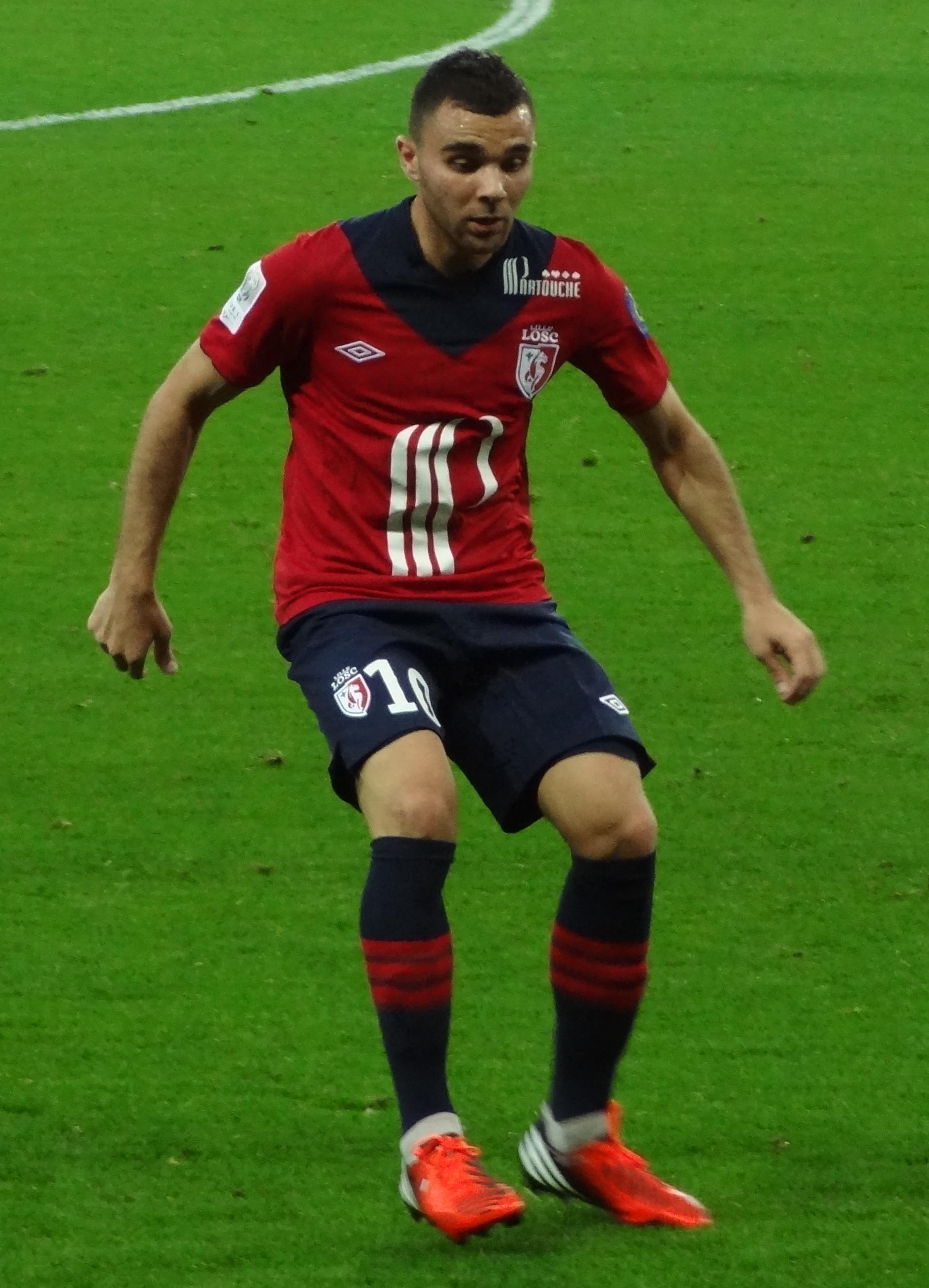
- Martin playing for Lille in 2012

Personal information
- Full name: Marvin Martin
- Date of birth: 10 January 1988 (age 38)
- Place of birth: Paris, France
- Height: 1.71 m (5 ft 7 in)
- Position: Midfielder

Team information
- Current team: Hyères (assistant coach)

Youth career
- 1994–1996: Club Athlétique de Paris
- 1996–2002: Montrouge CF
- 2002–2008: Sochaux

Senior career*
Years	Team	Apps	(Gls)
2008–2012	Sochaux	133	(8)
2012–2017	Lille	70	(0)
2013–2016	Lille B	8	(0)
2017	→ Dijon (loan)	12	(0)
2017–2019	Reims	29	(1)
2019–2021	Chambly	10	(0)
2020	Chambly B	2	(0)
2021–2023	Hyères	22	(1)
Total		286	(10)

International career
2008–2011	France U21	8	(0)
2011–2012	France	15	(2)
- * Club domestic league appearances and goals

Marvin Martin (born 10 January 1988) is a French professional football coach and former player who is the assistant coach of Championnat National 1 club Hyères. He played as a creative play-making midfielder and was described as a player with "very good technique on the ball" and "excellent vision", which compensated for his relatively small frame. Martin is a former France international, having appeared for his country at UEFA Euro 2012.

== Club career ==
=== Early career ===
Martin was born in the 14th arrondissement of Paris and hails from the Porte de Vanves area. He therefore grew up close to the Parc des Princes and regularly attended Paris Saint-Germain games, developing a passion for the French capital club. He began his football career at Club Athlétique de Paris at the age of six and, after two years at the club, joined sports club Montrouge CF in the southern Parisian suburbs. Martin's commitment to football accelerated after the France national team won the 1998 FIFA World Cup. He described the victory as "the moment I wanted become a professional player". While playing at Montrouge, Martin trained and played alongside Hatem Ben Arfa, Issiar Dia, Flavien Belson and Dominique Malonga. The quartet were beneficial to the under-13 team that won the Coupe de Paris in 1997, defeating PSG in the final.

After showing potential at Montrouge, Martin attended trials at the Clairefontaine academy with hopes of earning selection to the prestigious school. Following the conclusion of the camp, however, he was not selected, though his domestic teammate Hatem Ben Arfa was. Citing the player's failure to earn a spot at Clairefontaine, a coach at Montrouge later stated, "I do not know if it gave him added strength, but in any case, he continued to work instead of feeling sorry for himself." In 2002, Martin drew interest from professional club Sochaux after being spotted by club scout Christian Puxel. Club officials offered the player a trial. He accepted the offer and made the trek east to Montbéliard. In July 2002, Martin signed an aspirant (youth) contract with the club after impressing during a trial match held at the Stade Auguste Bonal.

=== Sochaux ===
Upon his arrival to the club, Martin was inserted into the club's prestigious youth academy and quickly developed a rapport with future teammates Ryad Boudebouz, Sloan Privat, Geoffrey Tulasne and Frédéric Duplus. Martin was influenced to train hard in the academy by former club player Camel Meriem, as well as academy graduates Jérémy Ménez and Mevlüt Erdinç who established themselves at Sochaux at a young age. In 2007, he played on the club's under-19 team that won the Coupe Gambardella. Sochaux defeated Auxerre 5–4 on penalties in the final match, which was played at the Stade de France. As a result of the youth team's cup success, several players on the team, including Martin, were promoted to the club's Championnat de France Amateur team in the fourth division. In the 2007–08 Championnat de France Amateur season, Martin appeared in a team-high 32 matches and scored three goals as the reserve team finished fourth in its group.

Following the conclusion of the 2007–08 season, Martin signed his first professional contract after agreeing to a three-year deal with the club. He was, subsequently, promoted to the senior team and assigned the number 26 shirt by manager Francis Gillot. Martin made his professional debut on 30 August 2008 in a 2–1 league defeat to Marseille, appearing as a substitute. Two weeks later, he made his first professional start in a 2–1 loss to Toulouse. In the team's next four league matches, Gillot inserted Martin as a starter. After the stint of consecutive starts, he rotated between the bench and the first eleven for the rest of the campaign. On 13 May 2009, Martin scored his first professional goal in a 3–0 victory over Monaco. He finished the campaign with 30 total appearances scoring only one goal.

In the 2009–10 season, following the departure of Romain Pitau, Martin was inserted into the starting lineup as his replacement by Gillot for the season. He was a vocal point in the midfield assisting on a goal in the team's second match of the season against Bordeaux. On 26 September 2009, he scored a goal in a 2–1 loss against Nancy and, in the following week, netted the game-winning goal against Le Mans. On 21 January 2010, Martin signed a contract extension with the club until 2014. Martin's play-making abilities began to develop and flourish during the season as he assisted on game-winning goals in victories over Lorient, Rennes and Lille. In the Coupe de France, he contributed to the club's reaching the quarter-finals as he scored a double in a 4–1 rout of amateur club Beauvais in the Round of 16. Martin finished the successful individual campaign with 40 total appearances, four goals and four assists.

Martin's importance within the team was further bolstered in the 2010–11 season after the departure of the club's primary playmaker, Stéphane Dalmat. Martin switched to the number 14 shirt in reference to the 14th arrondissement of Paris and was tipped to replace him by Gillot. The young midfielder responded positively and scored his first goal of the season on 14 August 2010 in a 3–2 loss against Saint-Étienne. The following month, he scored a goal described by the local media as a "moment of magic" in a 4–0 victory over Nice. Martin developed a strong simpatico with strikers Brown Ideye and Modibo Maïga, as well as winger Nicolas Maurice-Belay assisting on several of each player's goals. By the end of January 2011, Martin had assisted on a league-leading ten goals, which included both goals in the team's 2–1 win over Arles-Avignon on 7 August, another two in a 3–1 win against Caen, and one in a 5–1 thrashing of Rennes on 29 January. Martin also scored a goal in the win over Rennes. His performances during the campaign led to his teammates and friends playfully nicknaming him "Little Xavi" in reference to the Barcelona star playmaker. Because of his great performances in midfield throughout the league campaign, Martin was one of four players nominated for the UNFP Young Player of the Year, along with Mamadou Sakho, Yann M'Vila and André Ayew.

=== Lille ===
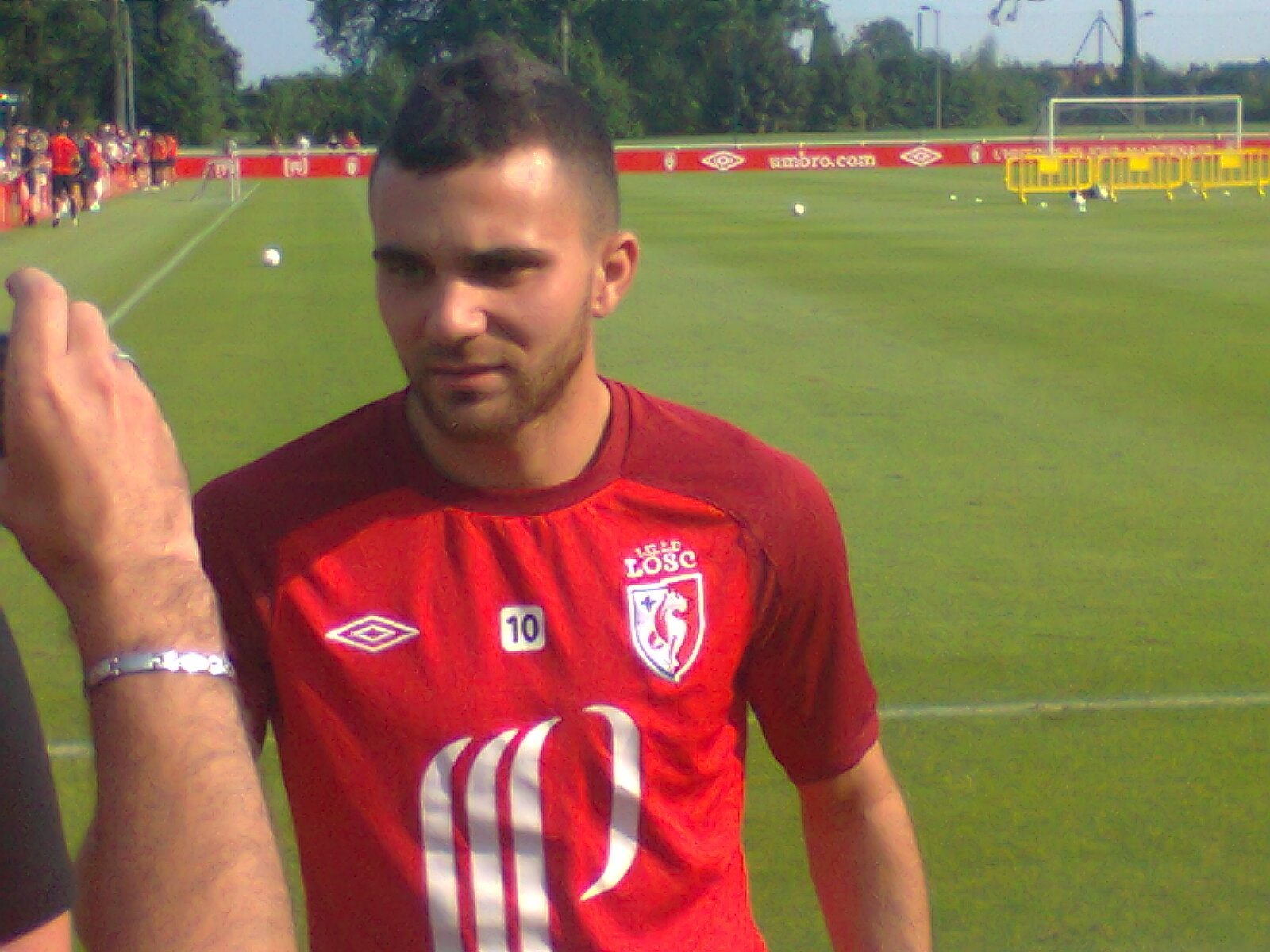
Martin playing for Lille in 2012

On 20 June 2012, French club Lille confirmed on its website that Martin had joined the club after agreeing to a five-year deal. The transfer fee was undisclosed and the midfielder joined the club on 1 July.

On 13 July 2016, Martin joined newly promoted Ligue 1 club Dijon on loan, after Lille coach Frédéric Antonetti stated the player was not part of his plans for the forthcoming season. On 11 August 2017, following his return from loan at Dijon, he was released from his contract at Lille.

=== Reims ===
On 14 August 2017, Martin joined Ligue 2 side Reims on a one-year contract with the option of two further years. Martin helped Stade de Reims win the 2017–18 Ligue 2, helping promote them to the Ligue 1 for the 2018–19 season.

=== Later career ===
In 2019, Martin signed for Chambly. He played in the club’s two seasons in Ligue 2. In 2021, he signed for Hyères, a club competing in the Championnat National 2. He retired at the end of the 2022–23 season.

== International career ==
During his development years, Martin went unnoticed by youth national team coaches. After establishing himself as a professional, he was called up to the France under-21 team in November 2008 to participate in a friendly against Denmark. Martin made his youth international debut in the match as a starter. He was substituted out after 61 minutes as France won the match 1–0. Martin featured with the team for the rest of the campaign as France failed to qualify for the 2011 UEFA European Under-21 Championship, which effectively ended Martin's under-21 career. On 26 May 2011, after a successful league season with Sochaux, Martin was called up to the senior national team by Laurent Blanc for June fixtures against Belarus, Ukraine and Poland. The midfielder described the call up as "a dream" and made his senior international debut on 6 June in the team's friendly match against Ukraine, appearing as a second-half substitute with the match drawn 1–1. In the match, Martin scored two goals and assisted on another, which was scored by fellow debutante Younès Kaboul, as France won the match 4–1. As a result of his double, Martin became only the fourth French international, after Jean Vincent, Zinedine Zidane and Bafétimbi Gomis, to score twice on his debut.

== Managerial career ==
On 28 March 2024, Martin was appointed assistant coach of Hyères, where he was playing before he retired.

== Career statistics ==
=== Club ===
Appearances and goals by club, season and competition
Club	Season	League			Cup (Note: Includes Coupe de France, Coupe de la Ligue)		Continental		Total	
Club	Season	Division	Apps	Goals	Apps	Goals	Apps	Goals	Apps	Goals
Sochaux	2008–09	Ligue 1	27	1	3	0	—		30	1
Sochaux	2009–10	Ligue 1	36	2	4	2	—		40	4
Sochaux	2010–11	Ligue 1	37	3	4	1	—		41	4
Sochaux	2011–12	Ligue 1	33	2	1	0	2 (Note: Appearances in the UEFA Europa League)	0	36	2
Sochaux	Total		133	8	12	3	2	0	147	11
Lille	2012–13	Ligue 1	32	0	6	0	7 (Note: Appearances in the UEFA Champions League)	0	45	0
Lille	2013–14	Ligue 1	20	0	2	0	—		22	0
Lille	2014–15	Ligue 1	6	0	0	0	2	0	8	0
Lille	2015–16	Ligue 1	12	0	3	0	—		15	0
Lille	Total		70	0	11	0	9	0	90	0
Lille B	2013–14	CFA	2	0	—		—		2	0
Lille B	2014–15	CFA	3	0	—		—		3	0
Lille B	2015–16	CFA 2	3	0	—		—		3	0
Lille B	Total		8	0	—		—		8	0
Dijon (loan)	2016–17	Ligue 1	12	0	1	0	—		13	0
Reims	2017–18	Ligue 2	16	1	2	0	—		18	1
Reims	2018–19	Ligue 1	13	0	0	0	—		13	0
Reims	Total		29	1	2	0	—		31	1
Chambly	2019–20	Ligue 2	6	0	0	0	—		6	0
Chambly	2020–21	Ligue 2	4	0	0	0	—		4	0
Chambly	Total		10	0	0	0	—		10	0
Chambly B	2019–20	National 3	2	0	—		—		2	0
Hyères	2021–22	National 2	18	1	0	0	—		18	1
Hyères	2022–23	National 2	4	0	1	0	—		5	0
Hyères	Total		22	1	1	0	—		23	1
Career total			286	10	27	3	11	0	324	13

=== International ===
Appearances and goals by national team and year
National team	Year	Apps	Goals
France	2011	9	2
France	2012	6	0
Total		15	2

France score listed first, score column indicates score after each Martin goal

List of international goals scored by Marvin Martin
No.	Date	Venue	Opponent	Score	Result	Competition
1	6 June 2011	Donbas Arena, Donetsk, Ukraine	Ukraine	1–2	1–4	Friendly
2	6 June 2011	Donbas Arena, Donetsk, Ukraine	Ukraine	1–4	1–4	Friendly

== Honours ==
Lille

- Coupe de la Ligue runner-up: 2015–16

Reims

- Ligue 2: 2017–18
