= Lorenzo Callegari =

French footballer (born 1998)

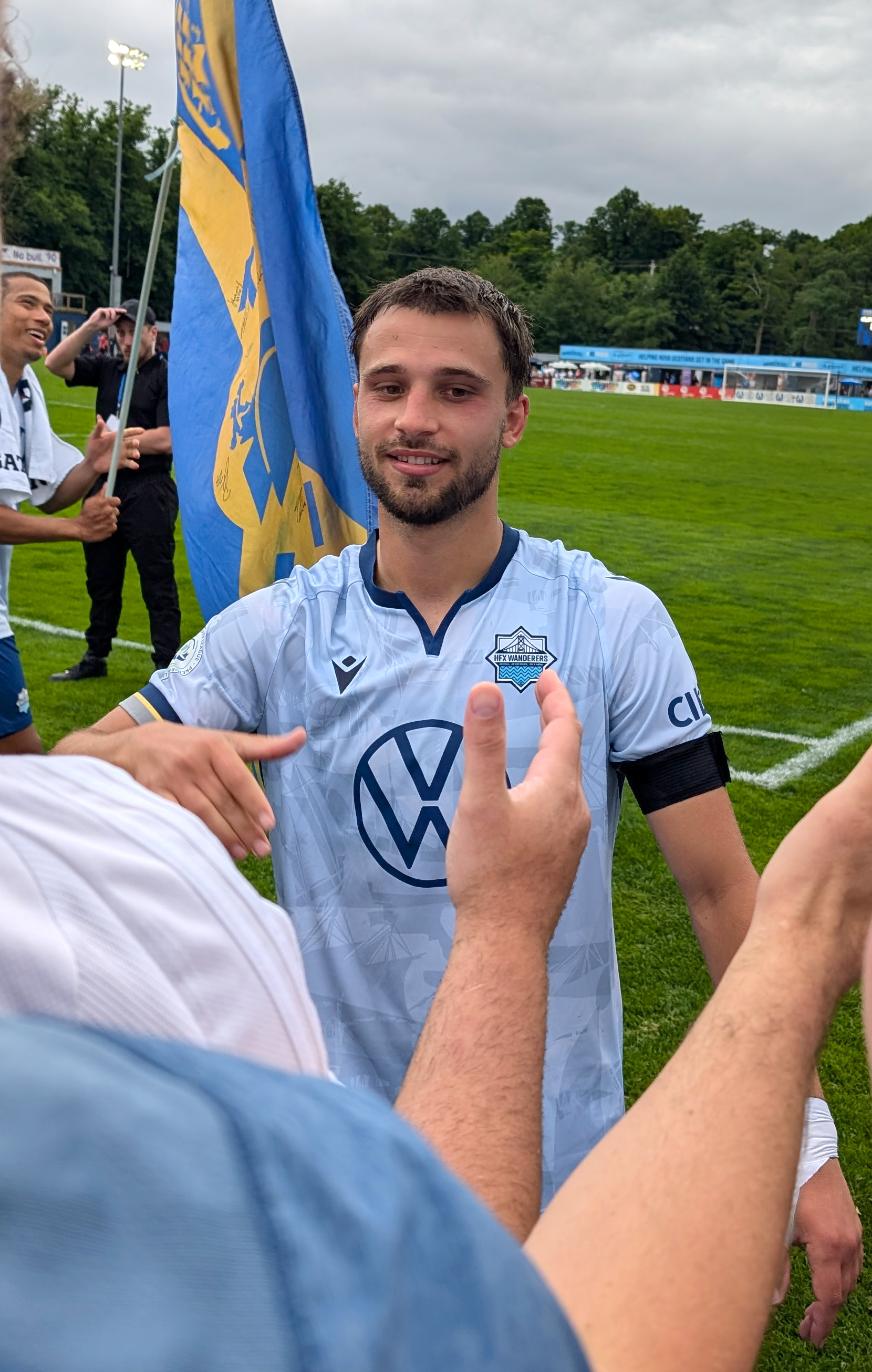
- Callegari with HFX Wanderers FC in 2024

Personal information
- Full name: Lorenzo Giuseppe Benvenuto Callegari
- Date of birth: 27 February 1998 (age 28)
- Place of birth: Meudon, France
- Height: 1.74 m (5 ft 9 in)
- Position: Midfielder

Team information
- Current team: HFX Wanderers
- Number: 6

Youth career
- 2004–2011: CSM Clamart
- 2011–2018: Paris Saint-Germain

Senior career*
Years	Team	Apps	(Gls)
2015–2018	Paris Saint-Germain B	43	(0)
2016	Paris Saint-Germain	1	(0)
2018–2019	Genoa	0	(0)
2018–2019	→ Ternana (loan)	16	(0)
2019–2020	Avranches	17	(0)
2019–2020	Avranches B	5	(0)
2020–2022	Chambly	30	(0)
2023–	HFX Wanderers	78	(1)

International career
2014–2015	France U17	6	(1)
2015–2016	France U18	4	(0)
2016–2017	France U19	7	(0)
- * Club domestic league appearances and goals as of 27 October 2025

Lorenzo Giuseppe Benvenuto Callegari (born 27 February 1998) is a French professional footballer who plays as a midfielder for Canadian Premier League club HFX Wanderers.

== Club career ==
=== Paris Saint-Germain ===
Callegari signed his first, three-year, professional contract with Paris Saint-Germain on 1 July 2015. He made his professional debut on 30 November 2016 in the Ligue 1 match against Angers. He replaced Lucas after 87 minutes in a 2–0 home win.

=== Genoa ===
On 10 July 2018, Serie A club Genoa confirmed the signing of Callegari on a free transfer. He signed a four-year contract with the Italian side. He was loaned out to Serie C club Ternana on 24 August 2018.

=== Avranches ===
On 2 August 2019, Callegari signed for French club Avranches on a two-year contract.

=== Chambly ===
In June 2020, Callegari joined Ligue 2 club Chambly.

=== HFX Wanderers ===
In January 2023, Callegari joined Canadian Premier League club HFX Wanderers on a one-year contract, with an option for 2024. He made his debut for the club on 15 April 2023 against Atlético Ottawa and was also named to the CPL Team of the Week following the match.

== Personal life ==
He is Italian through his father who is from Bettola.

== Career statistics ==
As of 27 October 2025

Appearances and goals by club, season and competition
Club	Season	League			Cup		Other		Total	
Club	Season	Division	Apps	Goals	Apps	Goals	Apps	Goals	Apps	Goals
Paris Saint-Germain B	2015–16	CFA	4	0	—		—		4	0
Paris Saint-Germain B	2016–17	CFA	22	0	—		—		22	0
Paris Saint-Germain B	2017–18	National 2	17	0	—		—		17	0
Paris Saint-Germain B	Total		43	0	—		—		43	0
Paris Saint-Germain	2016–17	Ligue 1	1	0	0	0	0	0	1	0
Ternana (loan)	2018–19	Serie C	16	0	0	0	—		16	0
Avranches	2019–20	National	17	0	0	0	—		17	0
Avranches B	2019–20	National 3	5	0	—		—		5	0
Chambly	2020–21	Ligue 2	10	0	1	0	—		11	0
Chambly	2021–22	National	20	0	1	0	—		21	0
Chambly	Total		30	0	2	0	—		32	0
HFX Wanderers	2023	Canadian Premier League	26	0	1	0	1 (Note: Appearances in the Canadian Premier League playoffs)	0	28	0
HFX Wanderers	2024	Canadian Premier League	25	0	1	0	—		26	0
HFX Wanderers	2023	Canadian Premier League	27	1	1	0	1	0	29	1
HFX Wanderers	Total		78	1	3	0	2	0	83	1
Career total			190	1	5	0	2	0	197	1

== Honours ==
Paris Saint-Germain U19

- Championnat National U19: 2015–16
- UEFA Youth League runner-up: 2015–16

France U17

- UEFA European Under-17 Championship: 2015
