= Killian Le Roy =

French footballer (born 1998)

Personal information
- Full name: Killian Le Roy
- Date of birth: 31 January 1998 (age 28)
- Place of birth: Pabu, France
- Height: 1.93 m (6 ft 4 in)
- Position: Goalkeeper

Team information
- Current team: Andrézieux
- Number: 1

Senior career*
Years	Team	Apps	(Gls)
2014–2018	Guingamp B	27	(0)
2018–2019	Saint-Étienne B	7	(0)
2019–2021	Chambly B	13	(0)
2020–2021	Chambly	5	(0)
2021–2022	Châteauroux	0	(0)
2021–2022	Châteauroux B	5	(0)
2023–2024	Racing-Union	17	(0)
2024–2025	Thonon Evian	24	(0)
2025–	Andrézieux	17	(0)
- * Club domestic league appearances and goals as of 6 February 2026

Killian Le Roy (born 31 January 1998) is a French professional footballer who plays as a goalkeeper for Championnat National 1 club Andrézieux.

== Career ==
=== Chambly ===
On 7 November 2020, Le Roy made his professional debut for Chambly, coming on as a substitute after the expulsion of Simon Pontdemé in a 2–2 Ligue 2 draw against Troyes. His first start came on 13 February 2021, when he played the full ninety minutes of 1–0 loss to Clermont.

=== Châteauroux ===
On 8 July 2021, Le Roy signed for Championnat National club Châteauroux on a two-year contract. On 31 August 2022, his contract with Châteauroux was terminated by mutual consent.
