= Pinoteau =

Pinoteau is a French surname. Notable people with the surname include:

- Claude Pinoteau (1925–2012), French film director
- Hervé Pinoteau (1927–2020), French historian
- Jack Pinoteau (1923–2017), French director, brother of Claude
- Xavier Pinoteau
