= John Popelard =

French footballer (born 1985)

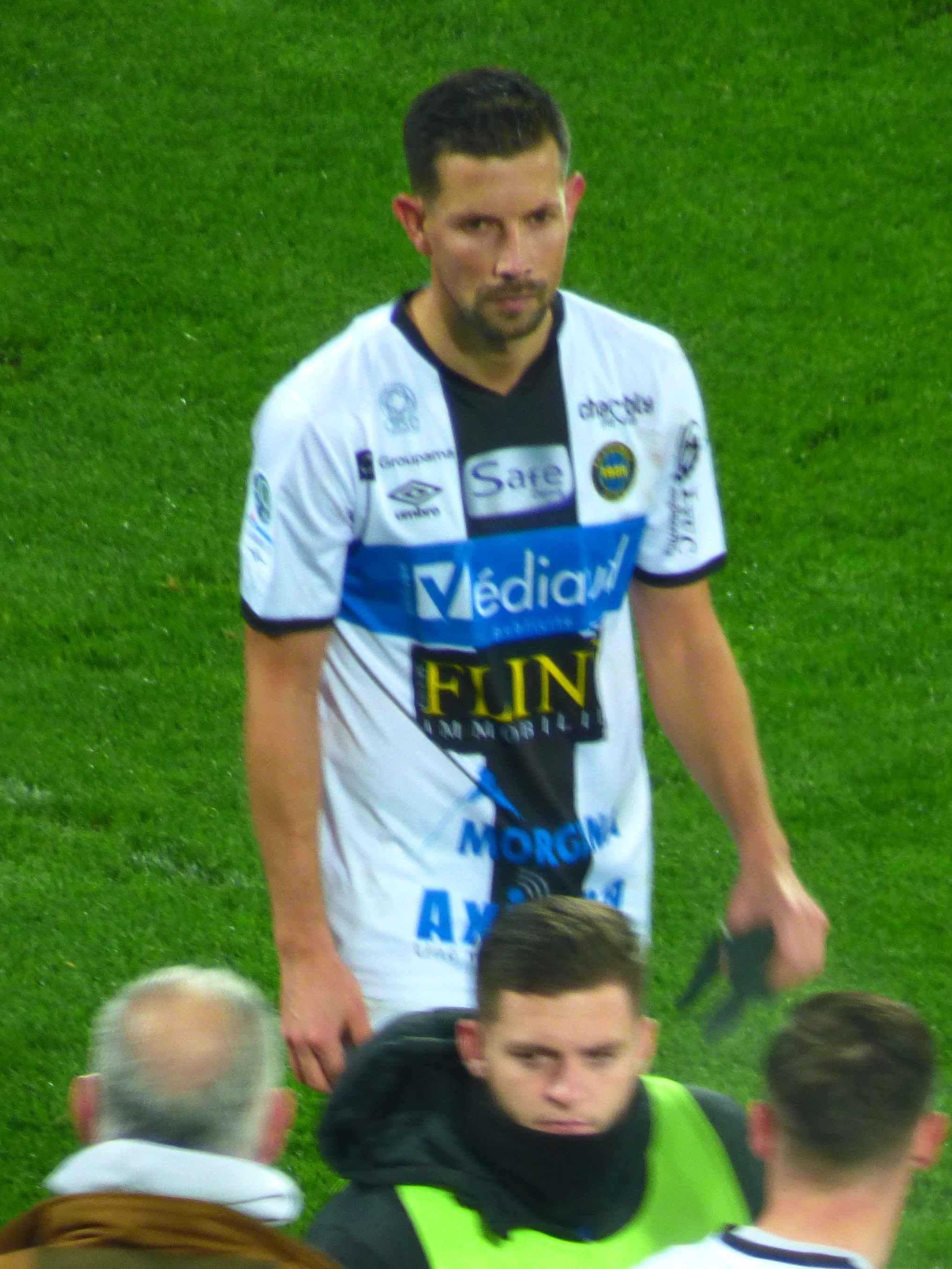
- Popelard with Chambly in 2019

Personal information
- Date of birth: 24 November 1985 (age 40)
- Place of birth: Senlis, France
- Height: 1.82 m (6 ft 0 in)
- Position: Midfielder

Team information
- Current team: Chantilly
- Number: 24

Youth career
- Chantilly

Senior career*
Years	Team	Apps	(Gls)
2010–2021	Chambly	180+ (Note: Statistics for the 2010–11 and 2011–12 seasons are unknown.)	(9+)
2017–2021	Chambly II	19	(2)
2021–2023	Beauvais	43	(1)
2023–	Chantilly	32	(1)
- * Club domestic league appearances and goals as of 16 November 2024

John Popelard (born 24 November 1985) is a French professional footballer who plays as a midfielder for Championnat National 1 club Chantilly.

== Career ==
=== Chambly ===
Popelard joined Chambly in 2010, when they were in the Championnat National 3 and helped them to repeated promotions until they reached the professional Ligue 2 in 2019. He made his professional debut with the club in a 0–0 Ligue 2 tie with Sochaux on 18 October 2019.

After relegation from the Ligue 2 in the 2020–21 season, Popelard decided to quit Chambly, where he had spent his entire career.

=== Beauvais ===
In June 2021, Popelard signed for Championnat National 2 club Beauvais.
