= Lucas Camelo =

French footballer (born 1999)

Personal information
- Date of birth: 7 February 1999 (age 27)
- Place of birth: Lyon, France
- Height: 1.91 m (6 ft 3 in)
- Position: Defender

Team information
- Current team: Créteil
- Number: 4

Youth career
- 2005–2010: Genay
- 2010–2013: Bord de Saône
- 2013–2017: Villefranche

Senior career*
Years	Team	Apps	(Gls)
2017–2019	Villefranche	14	(1)
2019–2020	Monts d'Or Azergues (Note: In 2020, Monts d'Or Azergues became GOAL FC.)	20	(3)
2020–2022	Chambly	35	(1)
2022–2024	GOAL FC	47	(4)
2024–2026	Villefranche	38	(2)
2026–	Créteil	1	(0)
- * Club domestic league appearances and goals as of 29 August 2026

Lucas Camelo (born 7 February 1999) is a French professional footballer who plays as a defender for Championnat National 1 club Créteil.

== Career ==
On 18 May 2020, Camelo signed his first professional contract with Chambly. He made his debut with the club in a 3–0 Ligue 2 loss to Clermont on 16 October 2020.

== Personal life ==
Camelo is the cousin of the French footballer Maxime Gonalons. He grew up a fan of Brest.
