= Anthony Soubervie =

French Guianan footballer (born 1984)

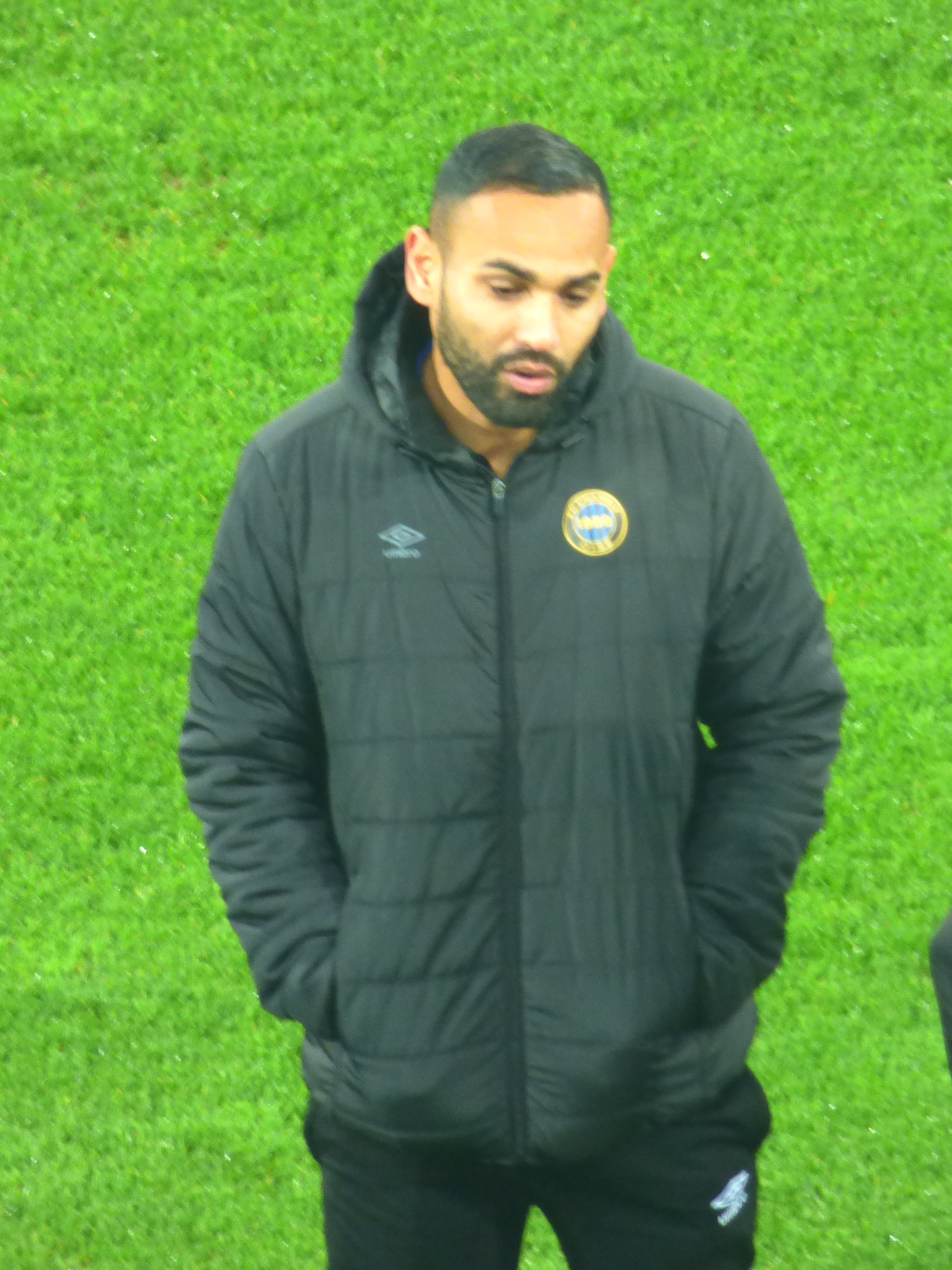
- Soubervie with Chambly in 2019

Personal information
- Date of birth: 24 April 1984 (age 42)
- Place of birth: Cayenne, French Guiana, France
- Height: 1.81 m (5 ft 11 in)
- Position: Right-back

Team information
- Current team: Angoulême
- Number: 7

Youth career
- –2003: Bordeaux

Senior career*
Years	Team	Apps	(Gls)
2003–2005	Nice B	27	(1)
2005–2007	Langon FC		
2007–2012	Bayonne	133	(11)
2012–2013	Rouen	34	(1)
2013–2015	Boulogne	52	(6)
2015–2016	Colmar	26	(4)
2016–2021	Chambly	136	(5)
2018–2019	Chambly B	2	(0)
2021–2022	Bourg-en-Bresse	21	(0)
2022–2024	Bergerac	29	(2)
2023–	Angoulême	18	(0)

International career
2014–2017	French Guiana	12	(1)
- * Club domestic league appearances and goals as of 23 August 2024

Anthony Soubervie (born 24 April 1984) is a French Guianan professional footballer who plays as a right-back for Championnat National 1 club Angoulême.

== Early life ==
Soubervie began playing football at the age of 5. A product of the Bordeaux youth academy, he was formerly teammates with Mathieu Valbuena, Rio Mavuba and Marouane Chamakh.

== Club career ==
With Rouen in 2012–13, Soubervie helped the club achieve a place in promotion to the Ligue 2 but the club went bankrupt and was relegated to the Division d'Honneur.

Looking for a right-back, then Colmar coach Didier Ollé-Nicolle contacted Soubervie, whom he knew from his Rouen days, knowing he would adapt well to the club. He then signed for them, accumulating four goals and seven assists that season.

On 8 July 2021, Soubervie moved to Bourg-en-Bresse.
