= Paul Schacherer =

French footballer (born 2002)

Personal information
- Date of birth: 16 January 2002 (age 24)
- Place of birth: Reims, France
- Height: 1.87 m (6 ft 2 in)
- Position: Centre-back

Team information
- Current team: Gueugnon

Youth career
- 2016–2020: Reims
- 2020–2021: Chambly

Senior career*
Years	Team	Apps	(Gls)
2021–2022	Chambly	1	(0)
2022–2023	Waldhof Mannheim II		
2023–2024	Chamalières	18	(0)
2024–	Gueugnon	9	(1)
- * Club domestic league appearances and goals as of 7 December 2024

Paul Schacherer (born 16 January 2002) is a French footballer who plays as a centre-back for Championnat National 3 club Gueugnon.

== Career ==
After four years playing for the Reims youth academy, Schacherer moved to FC Chambly.

He made his professional debut with Chambly in a 1-0 Ligue 2 loss to Clermont on 13 February 2021.
