= Aniss El Hriti =

French footballer (born 1989)

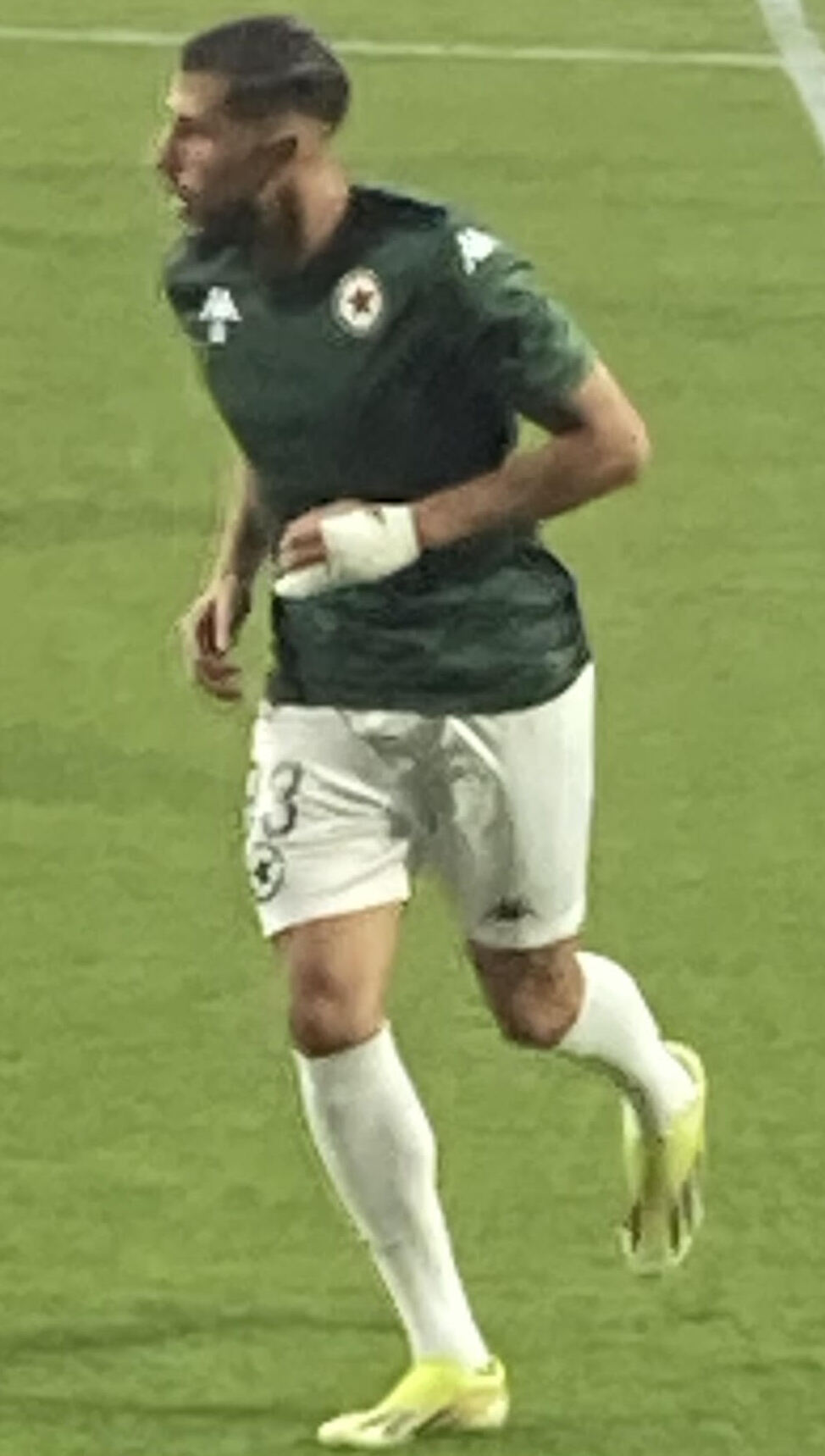
- El Hriti with Red Star in 2024

Personal information
- Date of birth: 28 July 1989 (age 37)
- Place of birth: Paris, France
- Height: 1.80 m (5 ft 11 in)
- Position: Left back

Team information
- Current team: UNA Strassen
- Number: 39

Senior career*
| Years | Team | Apps | (Gls) |
| 2011 | Gueugnon | 1 | (0) |
| 2011–2012 | Consolat | 21 | (3) |
| 2012–2014 | Le Pontet | 33 | (0) |
| 2014–2016 | Consolat | 9 | (0) |
| 2016–2017 | Épinal | 29 | (0) |
| 2017–2018 | Tours II | 7 | (1) |
| 2017–2018 | Tours | 9 | (0) |
| 2018–2020 | Dudelange | 12 | (0) |
| 2019–2020 | → Chambly (loan) | 21 | (1) |
| 2019–2020 | → Chambly II (loan) | 1 | (0) |
| 2020–2021 | Chambly | 33 | (0) |
| 2021–2025 | Red Star | 71 | (0) |
| 2025 | Versailles | 11 | (0) |
| 2025–2026 | Châteauroux | 12 | (0) |
| 2026– | UNA Strassen | 4 | (0) |
- * Club domestic league appearances and goals as of 13 June 2026

Aniss El Hriti (born 28 July 1989) is a French professional footballer who plays as a left-back for Luxembourg National Division club UNA Strassen.

== Career ==
Born in Paris, El Hriti is part of the talents of the Paris region and spent his formative years playing football in the divisions of France, and played First Division Futsal at Garges Djibson with Wissam Ben Yedder. He signed his first professional contract with Tours FC on 7 August 2017. He made his professional debut with Tours in a 1–0 Ligue 2 loss to Reims on 11 August 2017 at the age of 28.

On 3 February 2025, El Hriti joined Versailles in Championnat National until the end of the 2024–25 season. In July 2025, he signed for Châteauroux.

== Personal life ==
El Hriti is of Moroccan and Algerian descent. He holds both French and Moroccan nationalities.

== Honours ==
Red Star

- Championnat National: 2023–24
