= Lassana Doucouré =

French footballer (born 1988)

Personal information
- Date of birth: 24 September 1988 (age 38)
- Place of birth: Beaumont-sur-Oise, France
- Height: 1.96 m (6 ft 5 in)
- Position: Midfielder

Team information
- Current team: JS Saint-Pierroise

Youth career
- Olympique Adamois

Senior career*
Years	Team	Apps	(Gls)
2012–2013	Chambly	16	(6)
2013–2015	Châteauroux	4	(0)
2013–2015	Châteauroux B	12	(4)
2013–2014	→ Carquefou (loan)	3	(0)
2015–2021	Chambly	165	(24)
2019	Chambly B	2	(1)
2021–2022	Hyères	22	(3)
2022–2024	Chambly	52	(14)
2024–	JS Saint-Pierroise		
- * Club domestic league appearances and goals

Lassana Doucouré (born 24 September 1988) is a French professional footballer who plays as a midfielder for Réunion Premier League club JS Saint-Pierroise.

== Personal life ==
Doucouré was born in Beaumont-sur-Oise, France. He has French and Malian nationalities. He is the older brother of the footballer Boubacari Doucouré, who also played with him at Chambly.
