= Adrien Pinot =

French footballer (born 2001)

Personal information
- Date of birth: 6 May 2001 (age 25)
- Place of birth: France
- Height: 1.94 m (6 ft 4 in)
- Position: Centre-back

Team information
- Current team: Boulogne
- Number: 15

Youth career
- –2015: Beauvais
- 2015–2018: Chambly
- 2018–2020: Metz
- 2020–2021: Chambly

Senior career*
Years	Team	Apps	(Gls)
2021	Chambly	3	(0)
2021–2023	Saint-Priest	45	(4)
2023–2024	Beauvais	14	(0)
2024–	Boulogne	53	(3)
- * Club domestic league appearances and goals as of 12 May 2026

Adrien Pinot (born 6 May 2001) is a French professional footballer who plays as a centre-back for Ligue 2 club Boulogne.

== Club career ==
Pinot was a youth product of Beauvais and Chambly, before moving to Metz at 16, then returning to Chambly in 2020. Pinot made his professional debut with Chambly in a 1–1 Ligue 2 tie with Niort on 27 January 2021.

In July 2021, he joined Championnat National 2 club Saint-Priest. After two seasons at Saint-Priest, Pinot returned to his childhood club Beauvais in July 2023, which played in the Championnat National 2.

On 10 June 2024, it was announced that Pinot had signed for Championnat National club Boulogne.

== Personal life ==
Pinot is the nephew of the retired footballer José Pinot.
