= Joachim Eickmayer =

French footballer (born 1993)

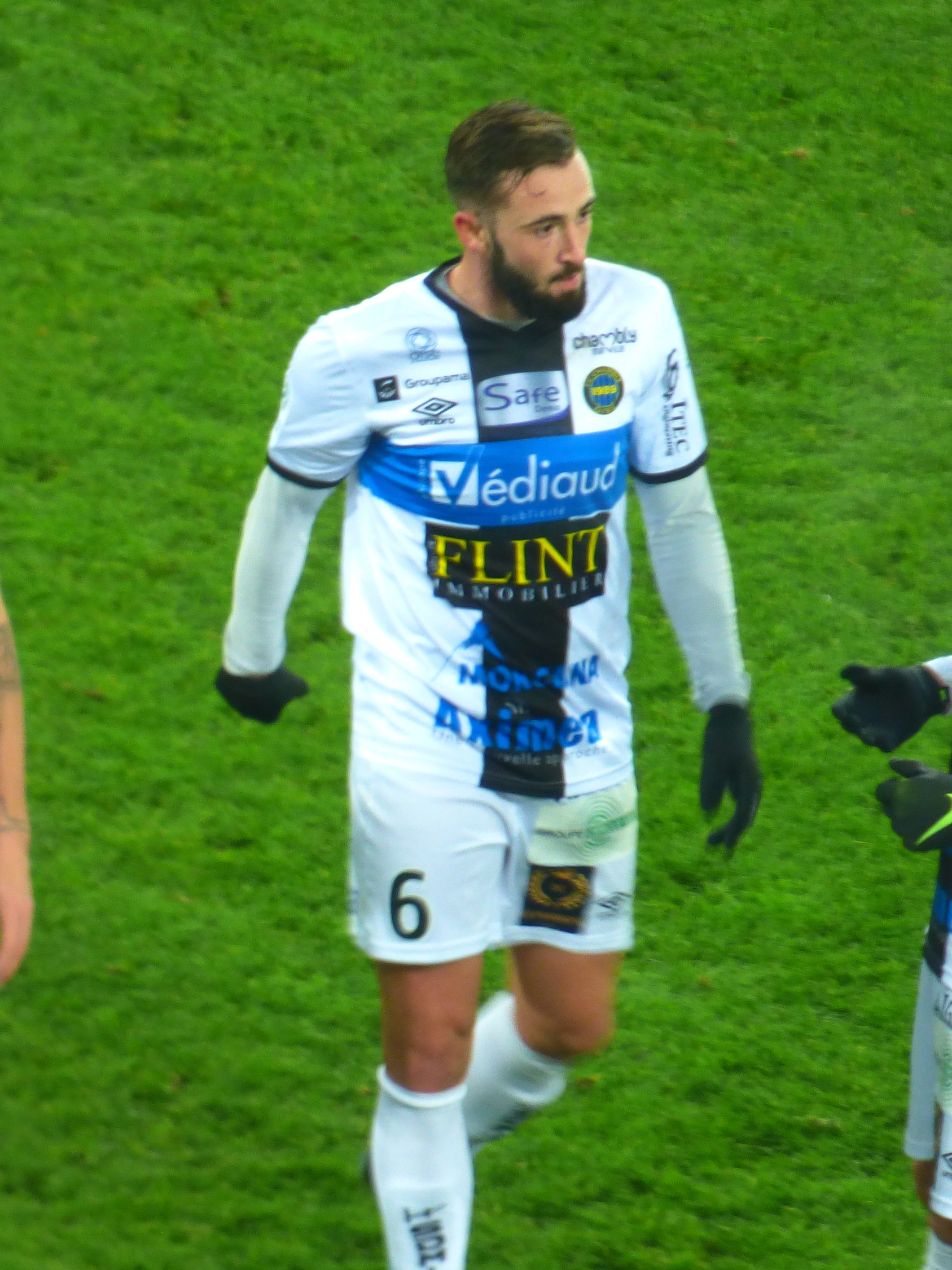
- Eickmayer in 2019

Personal information
- Date of birth: 11 January 1993 (age 33)
- Place of birth: Bully-les-Mines, France
- Height: 1.78 m (5 ft 10 in)
- Position: Midfielder

Team information
- Current team: Bastia
- Number: 17

Youth career
- –2013: Sochaux

Senior career*
Years	Team	Apps	(Gls)
2012–2014	Sochaux B	40	(0)
2013–2014	Sochaux	10	(0)
2014–2015	Arras	6	(1)
2015–2017	Amiens B	24	(1)
2015–2017	Amiens	31	(2)
2017–2018	Les Herbiers	30	(2)
2018–2021	Chambly	74	(2)
2021–2023	Bourg-en-Bresse	62	(6)
2023–2026	Red Star	66	(5)
2026–	Bastia	15	(3)
- * Club domestic league appearances and goals as of 12 May 2026

Joachim Eickmayer (born 11 January 1993) is a French professional footballer who plays as a midfielder for Ligue 3 club Bastia.

== Career ==
Eickmayer played 10 matches in Ligue 1 for Sochaux, making his full debut on 10 August 2013 against Évian Thonon Gaillard.

On 21 June 2021, he signed with Bourg-en-Bresse.

On 18 January 2026, Eickmayer moved to Bastia.

== Career statistics ==
As of match played 29 June 2024

Appearances and goals by club, season and competition
Club	Season	League			Coupe de France		Coupe de la Ligue		Other		Total	
Club	Season	Division	Apps	Goals	Apps	Goals	Apps	Goals	Apps	Goals	Apps	Goals
Sochaux II	2012–13	CFA	25	0	—		—		—		25	0
Sochaux II	2013–14	CFA	15	0	—		—		—		15	0
Sochaux II	Total		40	0	0	0	0	0	0	0	40	0
Sochaux	2013–14	Ligue 1	10	0	0	0	2	0	—		12	0
Arras	2014–15	CFA	6	1	1	0	—		—		7	1
Amiens II	2014–15	CFA 2	4	0	—		—		—		4	0
Amiens II	2015–16	CFA 2	9	1	—		—		—		9	1
Amiens II	2016–17	CFA 2	11	0	—		—		—		11	0
Amiens II	Total		24	1	0	0	0	0	0	0	24	1
Amiens	2014–15	National	6	1	0	0	0	0	—		6	1
Amiens	2015–16	National	19	0	0	0	0	0	—		19	0
Amiens	2016–17	Ligue 2	6	1	0	0	1	0	—		7	1
Amiens	Total		31	2	0	0	1	0	0	0	32	2
Les Herbiers	2017–18	National	30	2	0	0	8	1	—		38	3
Chambly	2018–19	National	31	0	0	0	0	0	—		31	0
Chambly	2019–20	Ligue 2	17	1	2	1	0	0	—		19	2
Chambly	2020–21	Ligue 2	26	1	0	0	0	0	—		26	1
Chambly	Total		74	2	2	1	0	0	0	0	76	3
Bourg-en-Bresse	2021–22	National	30	2	1	0	0	0	—		31	2
Bourg-en-Bresse	2022–23	National	32	1	0	0	0	0	—		32	1
Bourg-en-Bresse	Total		62	3	1	0	0	0	0	0	63	3
Red Star	2023–24	National	30	1	1	0	0	0	—		31	1
Career total			307	12	5	1	11	1	0	0	323	14

== Honours ==
Les Herbiers

- Coupe de France runner-up: 2017–18

Red Star

- Championnat National: 2023–24
