= Guillaume Dequaire =

French footballer (born 1990)

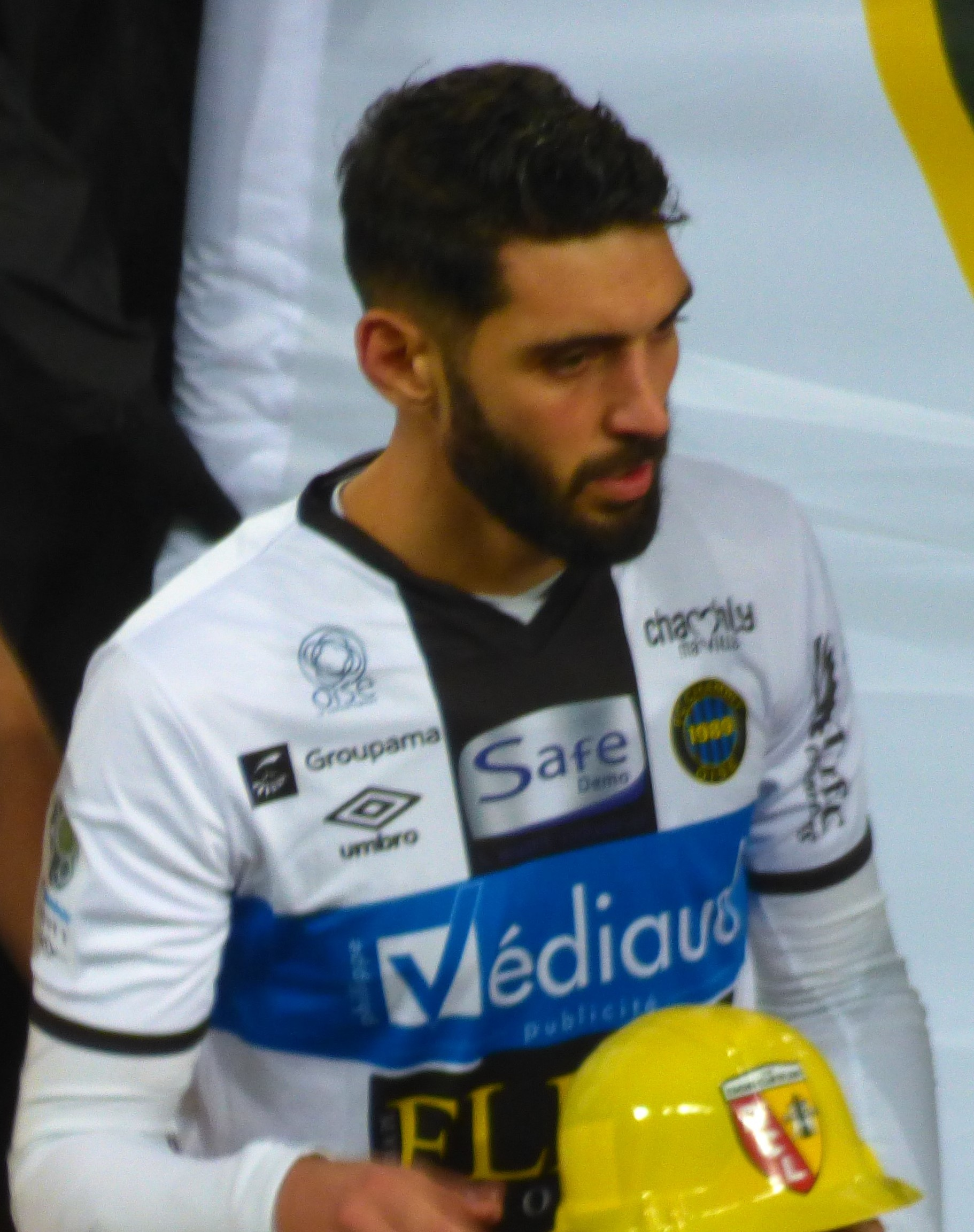
- Dequaire in 2019

Personal information
- Date of birth: 11 July 1990 (age 36)
- Place of birth: Besançon, France
- Height: 1.87 m (6 ft 2 in)
- Position: Centre back

Team information
- Current team: Union Hutoise
- Number: 39

Senior career*
Years	Team	Apps	(Gls)
2009–2012	Besançon	66	(3)
2012–2014	Oostende	30	(1)
2014–2015	Fréjus Saint-Raphaël	31	(4)
2015–2017	Châteauroux	25	(0)
2017–2018	Les Herbiers	26	(4)
2018–2021	Chambly	70	(3)
2021–2023	URSL Visé	37	(3)
2023–2024	RCS Verlaine	20	(2)
2024–	Union Hutoise	22	(1)
- * Club domestic league appearances and goals as of 21 January 2026

Guillaume Dequaire (French pronunciation: [ɡijom dəkɛʁ]; born 11 July 1990) is a French footballer who plays as a centre back for Union Hutoise.

== Career ==
On 31 August 2021, Dequaire joined URSL Visé in the Belgian third-tier Belgian National Division 1.

== Career statistics ==
As of 14 November 2015

Appearances and goals by club, season and competition
Club	Season	League			National cup (Note: Includes Coupe de France.)		League cup (Note: Includes Coupe de la Ligue.)		Total	
Club	Season	Division	Apps	Goals	Apps	Goals	Apps	Goals	Apps	Goals
Besançon	CFA Group A	2009–10	5	0	1	0	0	0	6	0
Besançon	CFA Group B	2010–11	30	2	2	0	0	0	32	2
Besançon	National	2011–12	31	1	1	0	0	0	32	1
Besançon	Total		66	3	4	0	0	0	70	3
Oostende	Second Division	2012–13	30	1	5	0	0	0	35	1
Fréjus Saint-Raphaël	National	2014–15	31	4	2	0	0	0	33	4
Châteauroux	National	2015–16	23	0	2	0	1	0	26	0
Châteauroux	National	2016–17	2	0	0	0	0	0	2	0
Châteauroux	Total		25	0	2	0	1	0	28	0
Les Herbiers	National	2017–18	0	0	0	0	0	0	0	0
Career total			152	8	13	0	1	0	166	8

== Honours ==
Les Herbiers

- Coupe de France runner-up: 2017–18
