= Medhy Guezoui =

French footballer (born 1989)

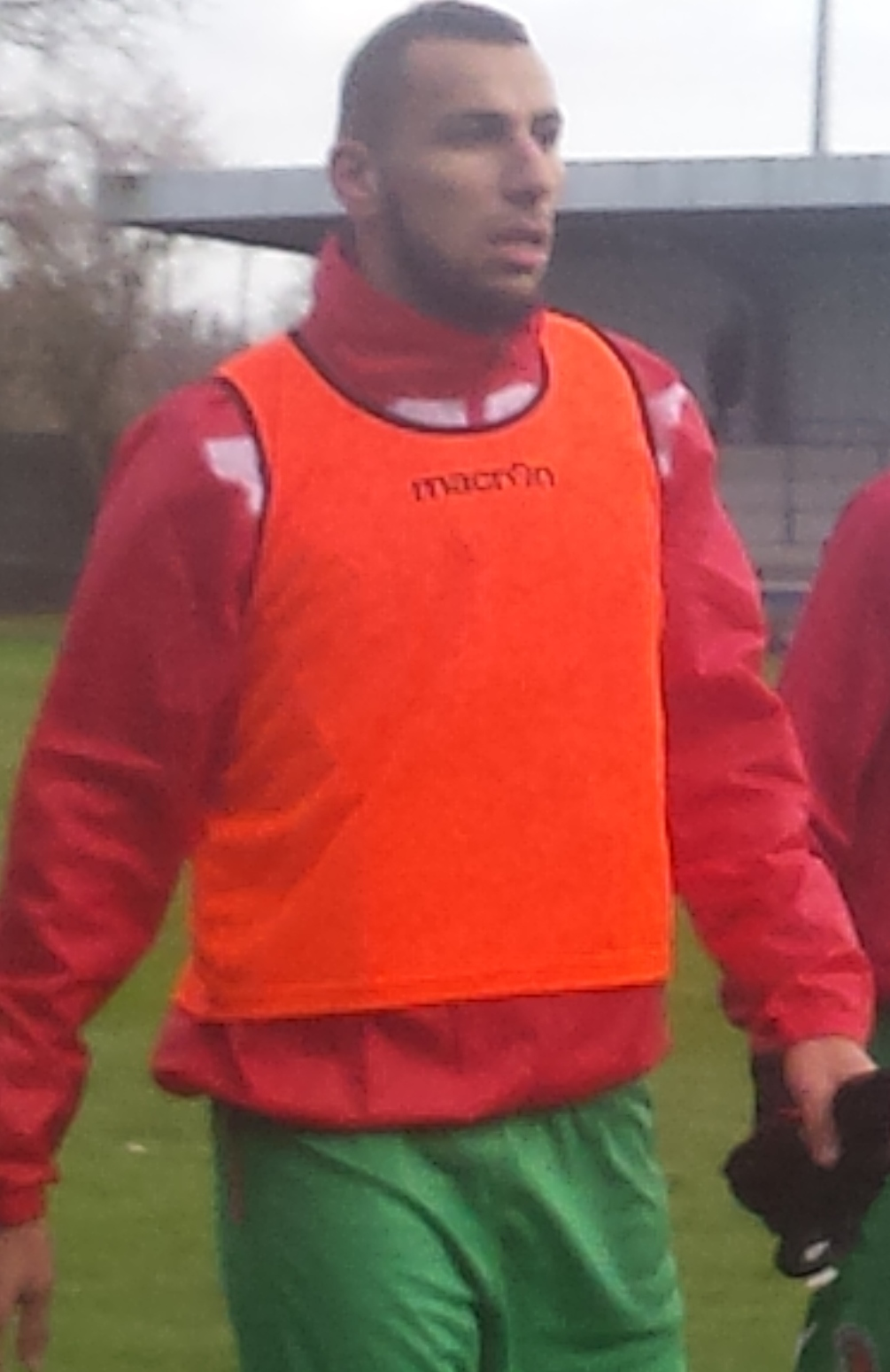
- Guezoui with Sedan in January 2015

Personal information
- Date of birth: 30 March 1989 (age 37)
- Place of birth: Lens, France
- Height: 1.88 m (6 ft 2 in)
- Position: Forward

Youth career
- 2007–2010: Lens

Senior career*
Years	Team	Apps	(Gls)
2010–2011	Niort	29	(4)
2011–2012	Lens II	15	(8)
2012–2013	Beauvais	26	(5)
2013	Beauvais II	3	(0)
2013–2014	Les Herbiers	19	(5)
2014–2015	Sedan	26	(4)
2015–2017	Quevilly	60	(31)
2017–2018	Valenciennes	34	(4)
2019–2021	Chambly	60	(8)
2021–2023	Villefranche	12	(0)
- * Club domestic league appearances and goals

Medhy Guezoui (born 30 March 1989) is a French former professional footballer who played as a forward.

== Career ==
After spending all of his early career in the lower divisions of the French league, Guezoui made his professional debut for Valenciennes FC in a 1–1 Ligue 2 tie with Gazélec Ajaccio on 28 July 2017, wherein he managed to score on his debut.

In January 2019, he signed a 3.5-year contract with FC Chambly.

On 2 August 2021, he moved to Villefranche. His contract with Villefranche was terminated on 17 January 2023.

== Personal life ==
Guezoui was born in France to a Moroccan father and an Algerian mother.
