= Maxence Derrien =

French footballer (born 1993)

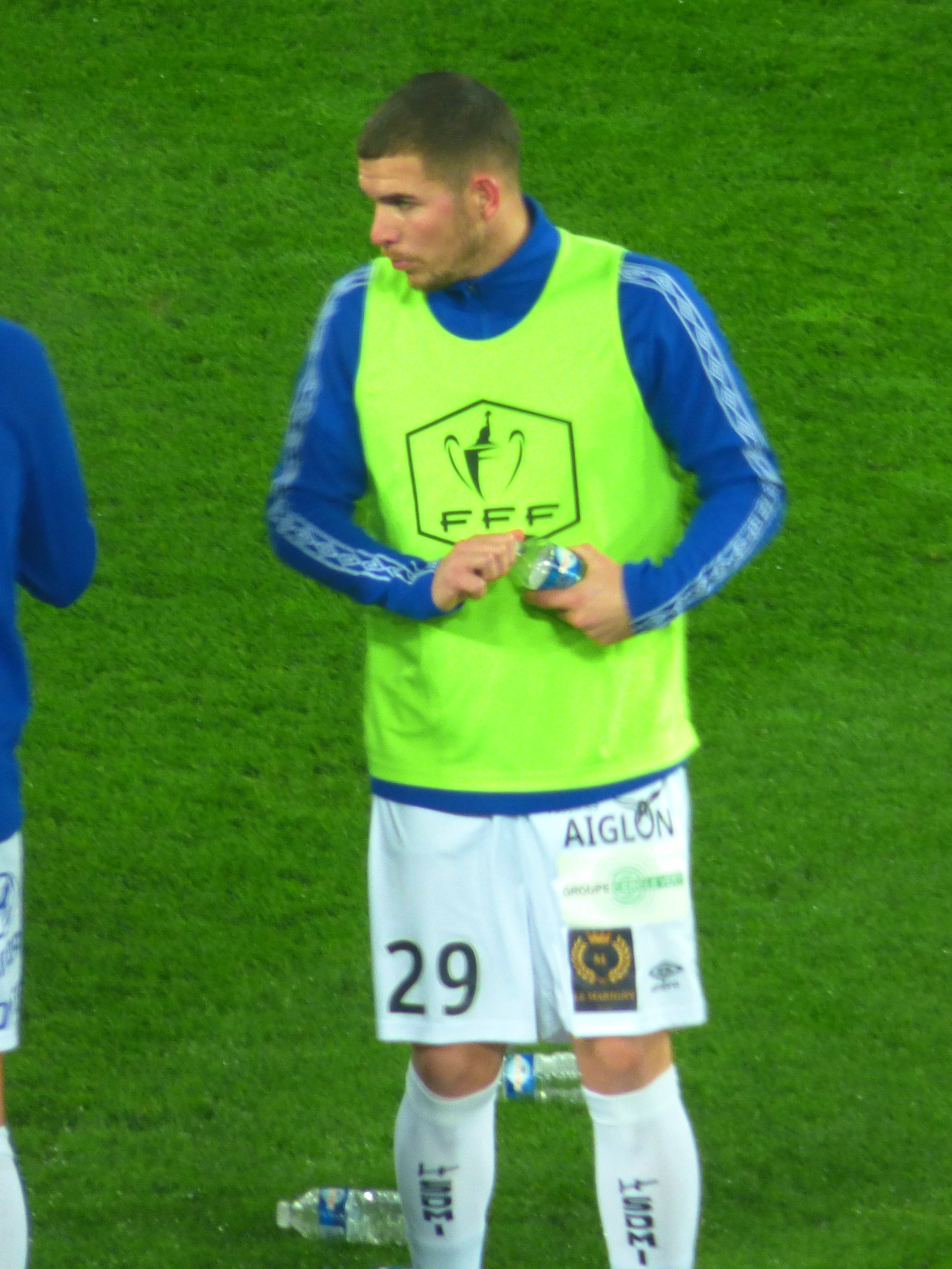
- Derrien in 2019

Personal information
- Date of birth: 3 September 1993 (age 33)
- Place of birth: Quimperlé, France
- Height: 1.82 m (6 ft 0 in)
- Positions: Defensive midfielder; centre-back

Team information
- Current team: Stade Pontivyen

Senior career*
Years	Team	Apps	(Gls)
2010–2014	Lorient B	80	(4)
2010–2014	Lorient	0	(0)
2014–2017	Avranches	78	(1)
2017	Avranches B	1	(0)
2017–2019	Red Star	61	(2)
2019–2021	Chambly	57	(1)
2021–2023	Le Mans	39	(2)
2022–2023	Le Mans B	2	(1)
2023–	Stade Pontivyen	5	(0)
- * Club domestic league appearances and goals as of 2 December 2023

Maxence Derrien (born 3 September 1993) is a French professional footballer who plays as a defensive midfielder or centre-back for Championnat National 3 club Stade Pontivyen.

== Career ==
On 21 June 2019, Derrien joined Ligue 2 club FC Chambly on a one-year contract. On 18 June 2021, he signed with Le Mans.
