= Shaquil Delos =

French footballer (born 1999)

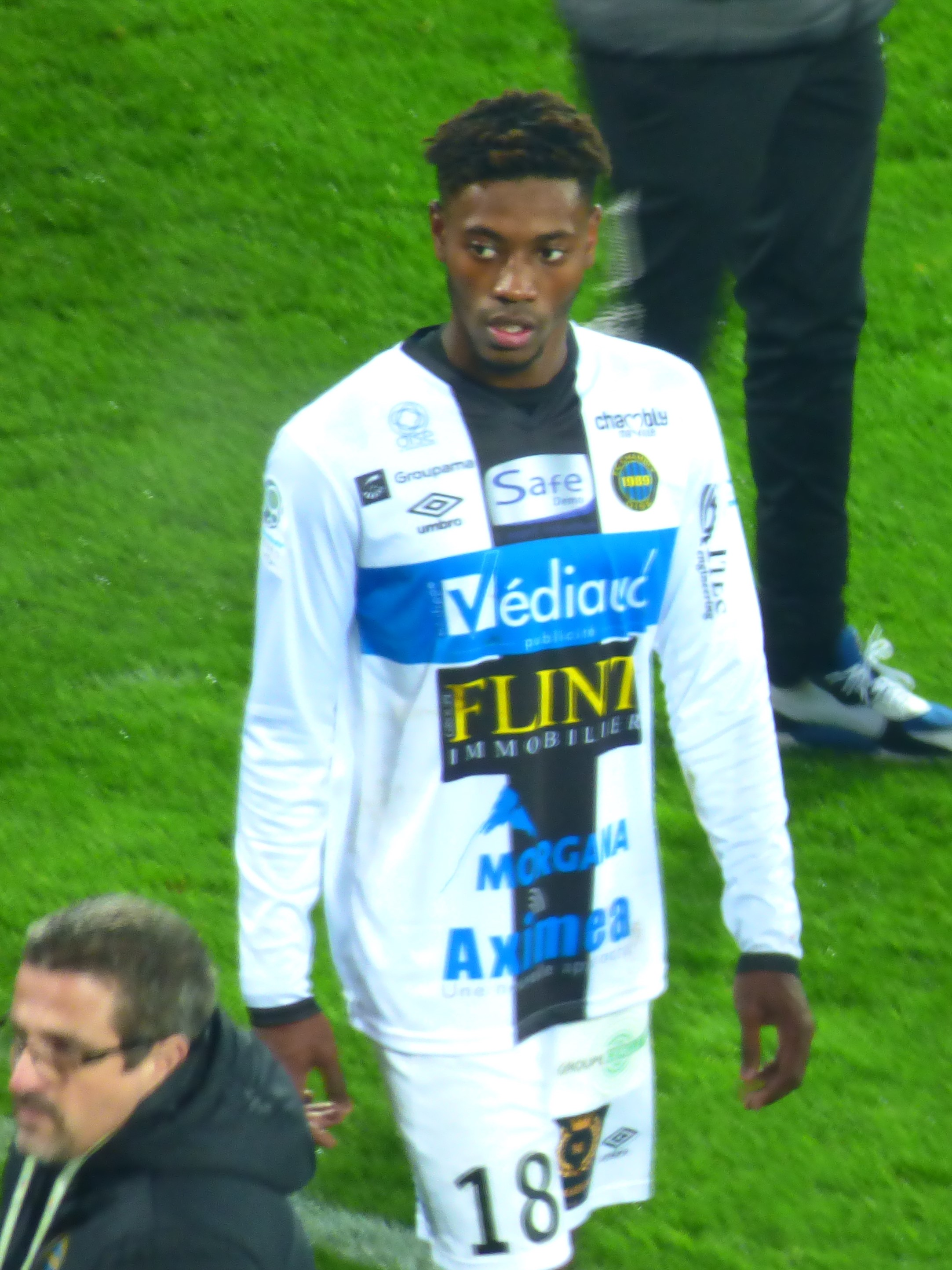
- Delos with Chambly in 2019

Personal information
- Date of birth: 16 June 1999 (age 27)
- Place of birth: Les Lilas, France
- Height: 1.79 m (5 ft 10 in)
- Position: Full back

Team information
- Current team: La Louvière
- Number: 18

Senior career*
Years	Team	Apps	(Gls)
2018–2019	Chambly II	29	(1)
2019–2021	Chambly	42	(3)
2021–2024	Nancy	65	(3)
2022–2023	→ Estoril (loan)	10	(0)
2024–2026	Grenoble	60	(2)
2026–	La Louvière	0	(0)
- * Club domestic league appearances and goals as of 12 May 2026

Shaquil Delos (born 16 June 1999) is a French professional footballer who plays as a full-back for Belgian Pro League club La Louvière.

== Career ==
On 5 May 2019, Delos signed his first professional contract with Chambly. He made his professional debut with Chambly in a 3–0 Ligue 2 loss to Lens on 3 December 2019.

On 30 August 2024, Delos signed for Ligue 2 club Grenoble on a three-year contract.

In the summer of 2026, Delos moved to La Louvière in Belgium with a two-season contract.

== Personal life ==
Born in metropolitan France, Delos is of Guadeloupean descent.
