= Jonathan Beaulieu =

French footballer (born 1993)

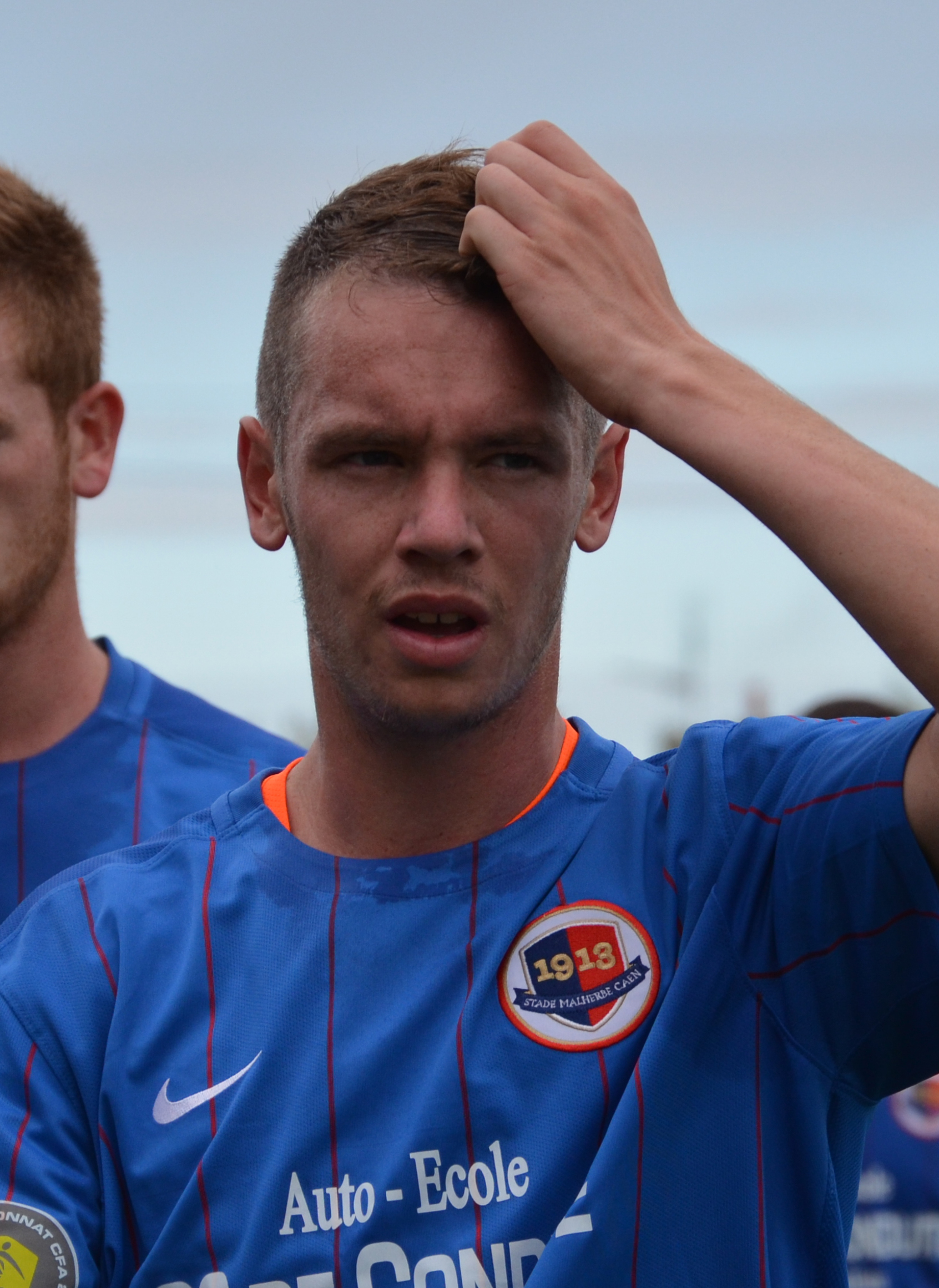
- Beaulieu with Caen B in September 2015

Personal information
- Date of birth: 11 March 1993 (age 33)
- Place of birth: Meudon, France
- Height: 1.80 m (5 ft 11 in)
- Position: Midfielder

Team information
- Current team: La Roche
- Number: 26

Youth career
- Caen

Senior career*
Years	Team	Apps	(Gls)
2010–2016	Caen B	83	(3)
2013	Caen	0	(0)
2016–2018	Granville	41	(1)
2018–2022	Chambly	87	(0)
2018	Chambly B	2	(0)
2023–2024	St Maur Lusitanos	37	(1)
2024–	La Roche	30	(1)
- * Club domestic league appearances and goals as of 4 December 2025

Jonathan Beaulieu (born 11 March 1993) is a French footballer who plays as a midfielder for Ligue 3 club La Roche.

== Career ==
Born in Meudon, Jonathan started his professional career with Caen. On 27 August 2013, he made his professional debut, coming as a substitute in a 3–0 home loss to Auxerre in the Coupe de la Ligue.
