= Guillaume Heinry =

French footballer (born 1989)

Personal information
- Full name: Guillaume Heinry
- Date of birth: 3 December 1989 (age 36)
- Place of birth: Paris, France
- Height: 1.85 m (6 ft 1 in)
- Position: Midfielder

Team information
- Current team: Saint-Malo
- Number: 21

Senior career*
Years	Team	Apps	(Gls)
2009–2010	Rennes	0	(0)
2010–2011	La Vitréenne	19	(2)
2011–2012	Compiègne	21	(4)
2012–2014	Beauvais	50	(8)
2014–2016	Chambly	56	(21)
2016–2018	Bourg-en-Bresse	60	(7)
2017	Bourg-en-Bresse B	2	(0)
2018–2022	Chambly	80	(8)
2020	Chambly B	2	(0)
2022–	Saint-Malo	6	(0)
- * Club domestic league appearances and goals as of 08:06, 4 October 2022 (UTC)

Guillaume Heinry (born 3 December 1989) is a French professional footballer who plays as a midfielder for Championnat National 1 club Saint-Malo.
