= Judicaël Crillon =

French footballer (born 1988)

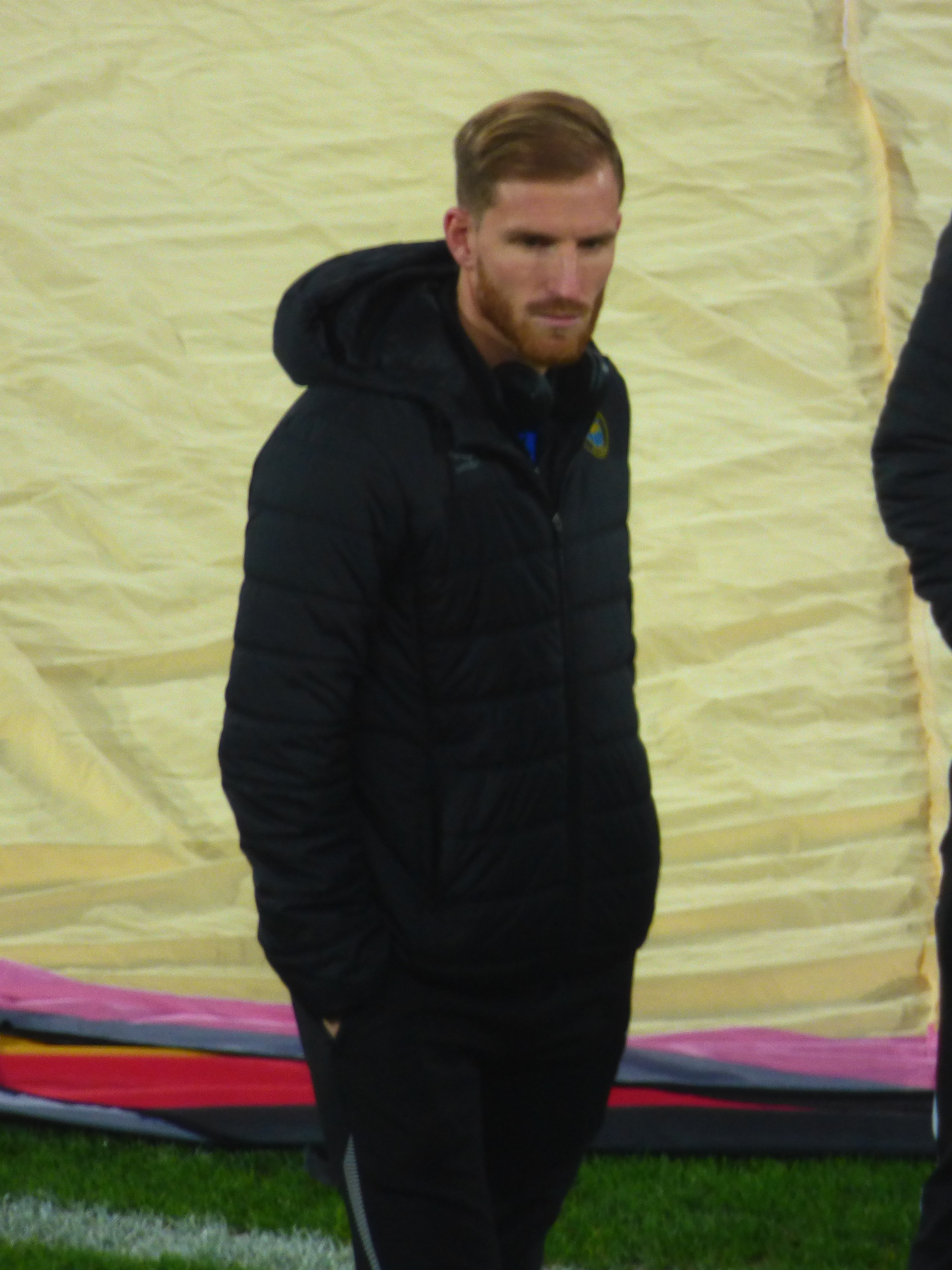
- Crillon in 2019

Personal information
- Date of birth: 21 November 1988 (age 37)
- Place of birth: Nancy, France
- Height: 1.79 m (5 ft 10 in)
- Position: Left back

Team information
- Current team: Racing-Union
- Number: 3

Youth career
- 1997–2007: Nancy

Senior career*
Years	Team	Apps	(Gls)
2007–2012	Raon-l'Étape	99	(6)
2012–2013	Épinal	32	(0)
2013–2015	Colmar	59	(5)
2015–2017	Châteauroux	32	(1)
2017–2018	Pau	18	(1)
2018–2020	Chambly	33	(0)
2020–	Racing-Union	37	(0)
- * Club domestic league appearances and goals as of 26 June 2023

Judicaël Crillon (born 21 November 1988) is a French professional footballer who plays as a left back for Luxembourgish club Racing-Union.

== Professional career ==
Crillon spent a decade in the youth academy of AS Nancy, before beginning his early career in the lower divisions of France. He made his professional debut with Chambly in a 1–0 Ligue 2 win over Valenciennes FC on 26 July 2019.

On 18 August 2020, he signed with Racing-Union in Luxembourg.
