= Thibault Jaques =

French footballer (born 1988)

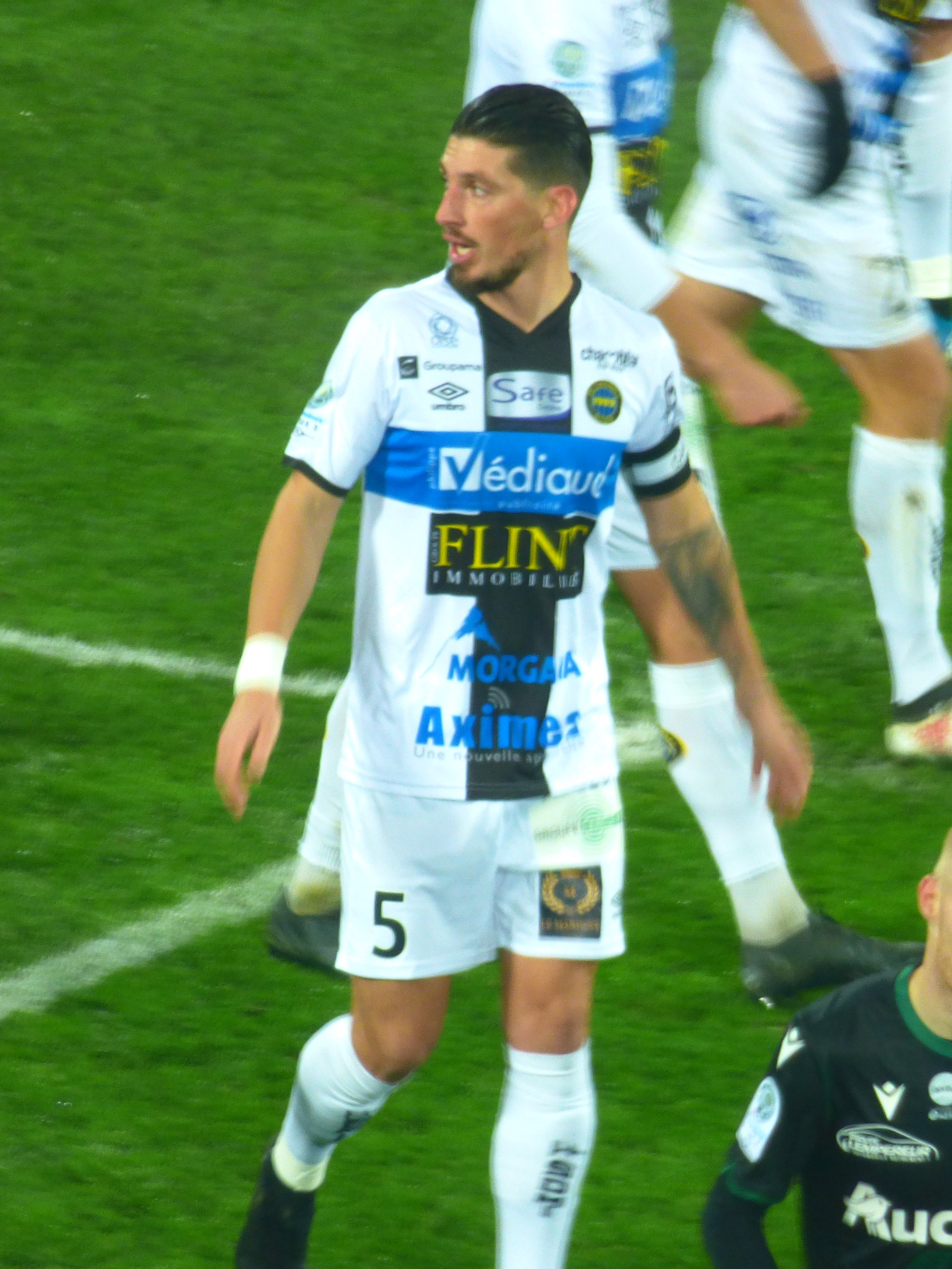
- Jaques in 2019

Personal information
- Date of birth: 29 March 1988 (age 38)
- Place of birth: Talence, France
- Height: 1.82 m (6 ft 0 in)
- Position: Centre-back

Team information
- Current team: Chambly
- Number: 29

Youth career
- 2003–2005: Châteauroux
- 2005–2006: Poitiers
- 2006–2008: Châtellerault

Senior career*
Years	Team	Apps	(Gls)
2008–2010	Châtellerault	50	(7)
2010–2014	Trélissac	118	(8)
2014–2015	Boulogne	49	(2)
2015–2016	Colmar	27	(0)
2016–2021	Chambly	129	(16)
2021–2022	Bourg-en-Bresse	34	(3)
2022–2024	Versailles	61	(7)
2024–2025	Poitevin	27	(2)
2025–	Chambly	16	(1)
- * Club domestic league appearances and goals as of 7 February 2026

Thibault Jaques (born 29 March 1988) is a French professional footballer who plays as a defender for Championnat National 1 club Chambly.

== Career ==
Jaques joined FC Chambly in 2016, and captained them to their first ever promotion to the Ligue 2 in 2015. He made his professional debut with Chambly in a 1–0 Ligue 2 win over Valenciennes FC on 26 July 2019, scoring the game-winning goal and the first ever for Chambly in the division. As a starter in the Chambly defense during this 2019–20 season, he was voted into the Ligue 2 Team of the Season by France Football.

In June 2022, Jaques moved to Versailles.

== Honours ==
Individual

- France Football Team of the Season: 2019–20
