= Xavier Pinoteau =

French footballer (born 1983)

Personal information
- Full name: Xavier Pinoteau
- Date of birth: 12 February 1983 (age 43)
- Place of birth: Saint-Denis, France
- Height: 1.88 m (6 ft 2 in)
- Position: Goalkeeper

Youth career
- 2000–2003: Beauvais

Senior career*
Years	Team	Apps	(Gls)
2003–2004	Beauvais	2	(0)
2004–2005	Gazélec Ajaccio	16	(0)
2007–2008	Villemomble	34	(0)
2008–2010	Red Star	50	(0)
2010–2011	Saint-Louis Neuweg	18	(0)
2011–2012	Entente SSG	8	(0)
2012–2013	Chambly	34	(0)
2013–2016	Beauvais	47	(0)
2016–2022	Chambly	48	(0)
2017–2019	Chambly B	10	(0)
Total		267	(0)
- * Club domestic league appearances and goals

Xavier Pinoteau (born 12 February 1983) is a French former professional footballer who played as a goalkeeper.

== Career ==
Pinoteau spent his most of his career in the lower leagues of France, and signed a professional contract with Chambly on 11 June 2016. He made his professional-level debut with the club in a 2–1 Ligue 2 loss to Paris FC on 7 February 2020, a couple days shy of his 37th birthday.

In a match against Caen on 30 January 2021, Pinoteau took a blow to the head and was sent to the hospital. According to the club, he was doing better and had regained consciousness. Coincidentally, in the same match, Caen's goalkeeper Garissone Innocent was also rushed to the hospital after suffering a tachycardia attack and collapsing on the field.

In 2022, at the age of 39, Pinoteau announced his retirement from football.
