= Joris Correa =

French footballer (born 1993)

Personal information
- Date of birth: 25 December 1993 (age 32)
- Place of birth: Drancy, France
- Height: 1.74 m (5 ft 9 in)
- Position: Forward

Team information
- Current team: Bulle
- Number: 80

Youth career
- 2007–2012: Bastia

Senior career*
Years	Team	Apps	(Gls)
2012–2014	Bastia II	48	(18)
2014	Bastia	1	(0)
2014–2015	Paris FC II	20	(10)
2015–2016	Sedan	15	(0)
2016–2017	Grande-Synthe	14	(6)
2017–2018	Sainte-Geneviève	30	(13)
2018–2019	Chambly	33	(13)
2019–2020	Orléans	10	(0)
2020	→ Chambly (loan)	7	(3)
2020–2021	Chambly	36	(9)
2021–2023	Grenoble	51	(5)
2023–2024	Alès	9	(0)
2024	Gokulam Kerala		
2025	Vevey-Sports	30	(2)
2026–	Bulle	26	(1)
- * Club domestic league appearances and goals as of 1 October 2026

Joris Correa (born 25 December 1993) is a French professional footballer who plays as a forward for Swiss Promotion League club Bulle.

== Career ==
Correa made his professional debut with his youth club SC Bastia in a 2–0 Ligue 1 win over Stade de Reims on 22 March 2014. After spending his early career in the lower divisions of France, he joined US Orléans in the Ligue 2 for three years on 11 May 2019.

== Personal life ==
Correa was born in France, and is of Senegalese descent.
