= Bastian Badu =

French footballer (born 2000)

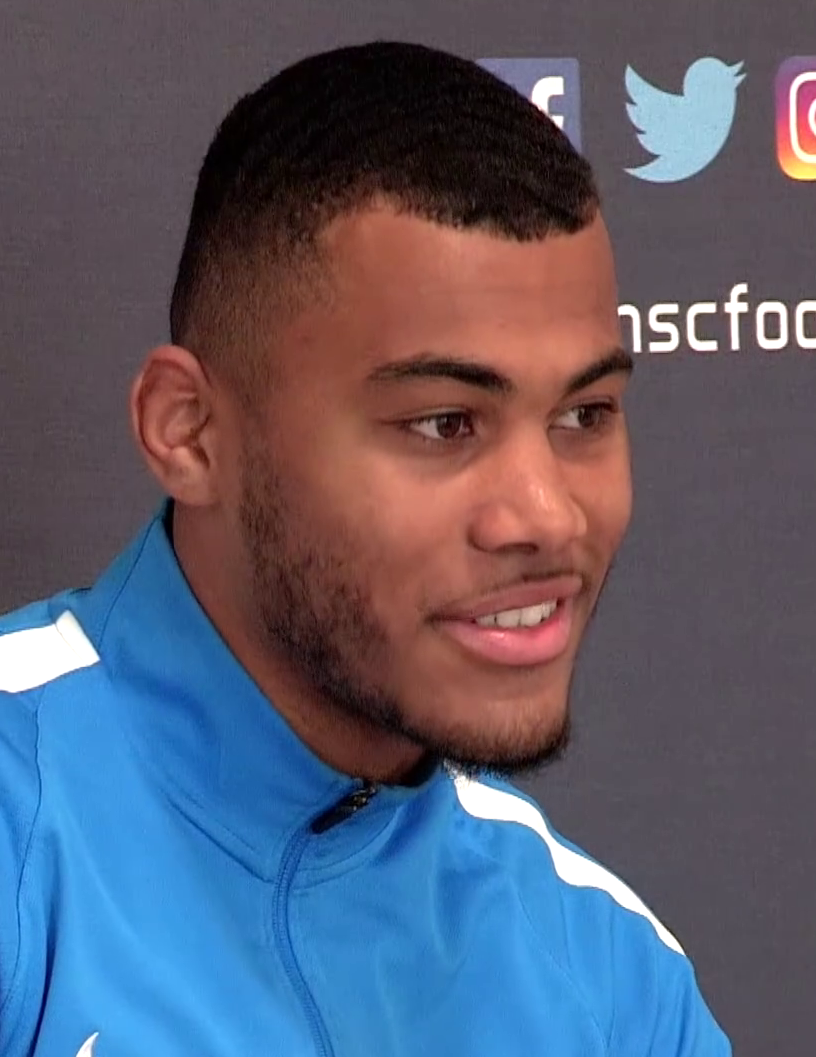
- Badu in 2019

Personal information
- Date of birth: 2 February 2000 (age 26)
- Place of birth: Le Mans, France
- Height: 1.88 m (6 ft 2 in)
- Position: Forward

Team information
- Current team: Istres
- Number: 9

Youth career
- 2010–2011: Ézanville Ecouen
- 2011–2013: Paris Saint-Germain
- 2013–2016: AAS Sarcelles
- 2016–2017: Entente SSG
- 2017–2017: Montpellier

Senior career*
Years	Team	Apps	(Gls)
2018–2021	Montpellier B	11	(3)
2019–2021	Montpellier	1	(0)
2020–2021	→ Chambly (loan)	21	(2)
2021	Le Mans	3	(0)
2021	Le Mans B	1	(0)
2022	Chambly	2	(0)
2023	Moulins Yzeure	7	(0)
2024–2025	Nîmes	3	(0)
2025–	Istres	4	(0)

International career
2018	France U18	3	(1)
- * Club domestic league appearances and goals as of 13 December 2025

Bastian Badu (born 2 February 2000) is a French professional footballer who plays as a forward for National 2 club Istres.

== Club career ==
On 25 October 2019, Badu signed his first professional contract with Montpellier. He made his professional debut with Montpellier in a 0–0 Ligue 1 tie with Angers on 26 October 2019.

On 2 January 2020, Badu joined Ligue 2 club Chambly on loan for the rest of the season. The loan was renewed for the 2020–21 season.

On 2 July 2021, Badu signed for Le Mans. On 1 February 2022, he returned to Chambly on a deal until the end of the season. In the beginning of February 2023, Badu signed with Moulins Yzeure. He left the club at the end of the season.

== International career ==
Born in France, Badu is of Congolese descent. He is a youth international for France.
