= Simon Pontdemé =

French footballer (born 1988)

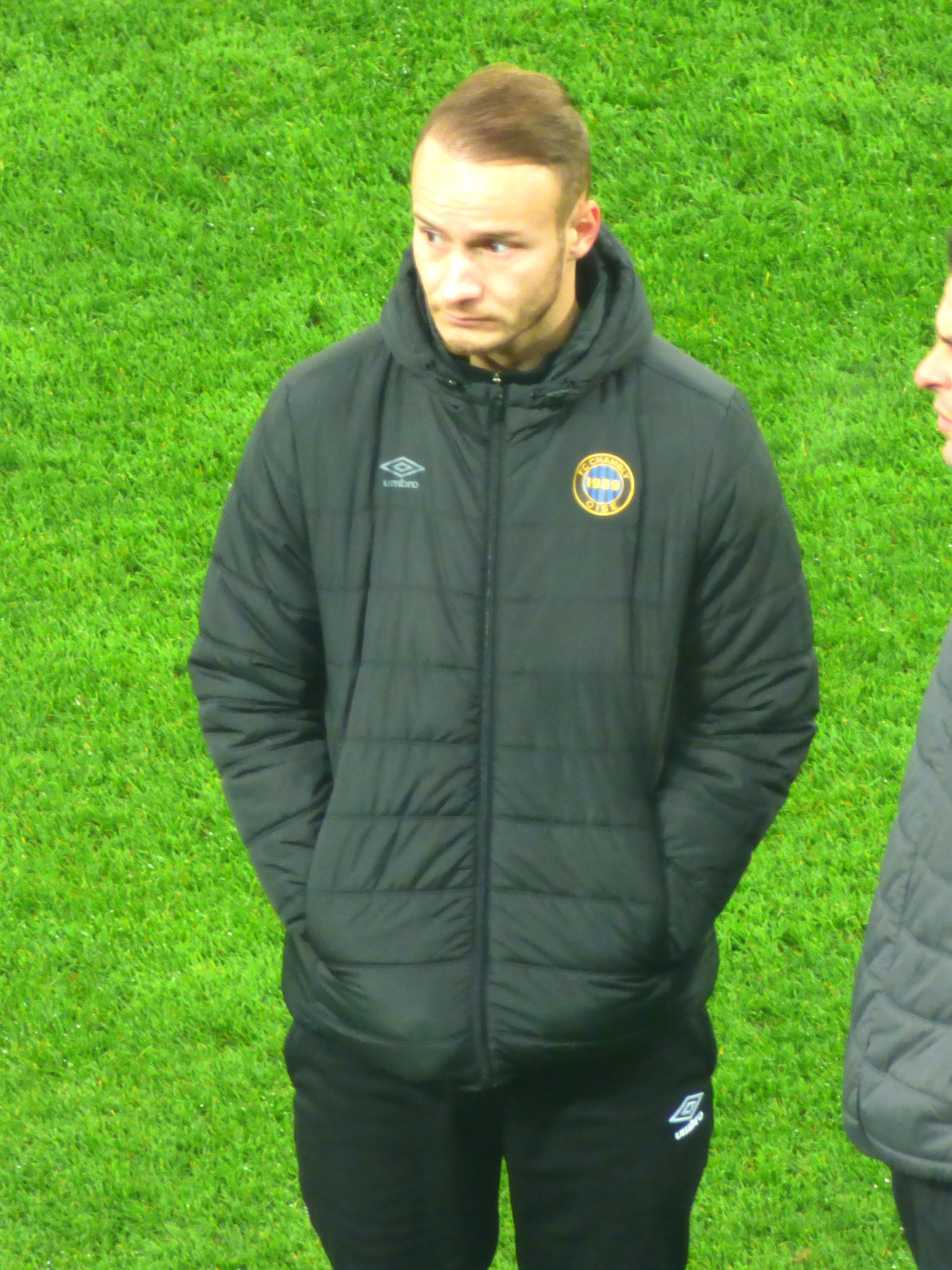
- Pontdemé with Chambly in 2019

Personal information
- Full name: Simon Pontdemé
- Date of birth: 4 May 1988 (age 38)
- Place of birth: Niort, France
- Height: 1.84 m (6 ft 0 in)
- Position: Goalkeeper

Team information
- Current team: Chambly
- Number: 30

Senior career*
Years	Team	Apps	(Gls)
2006–2009	Chamois Niortais	52	(0)
2009–2011	Brest	0	(0)
2011–2012	Auxerre	0	(0)
2011–2012	Auxerre B	15	(0)
2013–2014	Le Havre B	14	(0)
2013–2014	Le Havre	5	(0)
2014–2015	Le Mans	11	(0)
2015–2021	Chambly	125	(0)
2017	Chambly B	1	(0)
2021–2022	Boulogne	28	(0)
2022–	Chambly	6	(0)

International career
2005–2006	France U17	3	(0)
2006–2007	France U18	3	(0)
- * Club domestic league appearances and goals as of 17:02, 10 October 2022 (UTC)

Simon Pontdemé (born 4 May 1988) is a French professional footballer who plays as a goalkeeper for Championnat National 1 club Chambly.

== Career ==
Pontdemé won three caps for the France under-18 national team in the 2006–07 season.

== Career statistics ==
As of 30 October 2015.

Appearances and goals by club, season and competition
Club	Season	League			Cup		League Cup		Total	
Club	Season	Division	Apps	Goals	Apps	Goals	Apps	Goals	Apps	Goals
Chamois Niortais	2005–06	National	0	0	1	0	0	0	1	0
Chamois Niortais	2006–07	Ligue 2	2	0	0	0	0	0	2	0
Chamois Niortais	2007–08	Ligue 2	27	0	0	0	3	0	30	0
Chamois Niortais	2008–09	National	23	0	0	0	1	0	24	0
Brest	2009–10	Ligue 2	0	0	4	0	0	0	4	0
Le Havre	2012–13	Ligue 2	3	0	0	0	0	0	3	0
Le Havre	2013–14	Ligue 2	2	0	1	0	2	0	5	0
Le Mans	2014–15	CFA2 Group B	11	0	0	0	0	0	11	0
Chambly	2015–16	National	10	0	1	0	0	0	10	0
Career totals			78	0	7	0	6	0	91	0
