= FC Chambly Oise =

French football club

Chambly
- Full name: Football Club Chambly Oise
- Founded: 1989; 37 years ago
- Ground: Stade Walter-Luzi
- Capacity: 4,550
- President: Fulvio Luzi
- Manager: Stéphane Masala
- League: National 1 Group C
- 2023–24: National 2 Group C, 4th of 14
- Website: www.fcchambly.com
Home colours	Away colours

Football Club Chambly Oise (French pronunciation: [futbol klœb ʃɑ̃bli waz]), commonly known as Chambly, is a French professional football club based in Chambly in the Hauts-de-France region. Their home stadium is the Stade Walter-Luzi in the town, and they compete in the Championnat National 1, the fourth tier of French football, as of the 2025–26 season.

== History ==
The club was founded in 1989 and previously played in Ligue 2, the second division of French football, after achieving promotion from the Championnat National in 2019. They were relegated back in 2021. They previously won promotion from the Division d'Honneur in the 2009–10 season. The club's emblem and kits take a heavy influence from Italian club Inter Milan.

On 1 February 2017, Chambly achieved a club milestone by drawing with French top-flight outfit Monaco 3–3 during regulation time in a Coupe de la Ligue match, before eventually losing 4–5 in extra time. On 1 March 2018, Chambly defeated Strasbourg 1–0 to reach the semi-finals of the Coupe de France for the first time ever. However, the club suffered a personal tragedy as Walter Luzi, the club's founder, died in a hospital on the same day.

On 19 April 2019, the club achieved promotion to Ligue 2 for the first time in its history. Due to the promotion, the club would play its league matches in the 2019–20 Ligue 2 season at two venues; fifteen matches at the Stade Pierre Brisson, and four at the Stade Sébastien Charléty, as the Stade des Marais did not meet the standards for Ligue 2 football. The Stade des Marais was being upgraded to Ligue 2 standards, with a capacity of 3,000 envisioned. However, construction was temporary halted in December 2020.

After suffering relegation from Ligue 2 in 2021, Chambly continued with a relegation from the Championnat National in 2022, returning to the Championnat National 2. Ahead of the 2022–23 season, Fabien Valéri was appointed as head coach. It was the first time that Chambly began a season without a member of the Luzi family in the managerial position, with Bruno Luzi leaving the club earlier in the year.

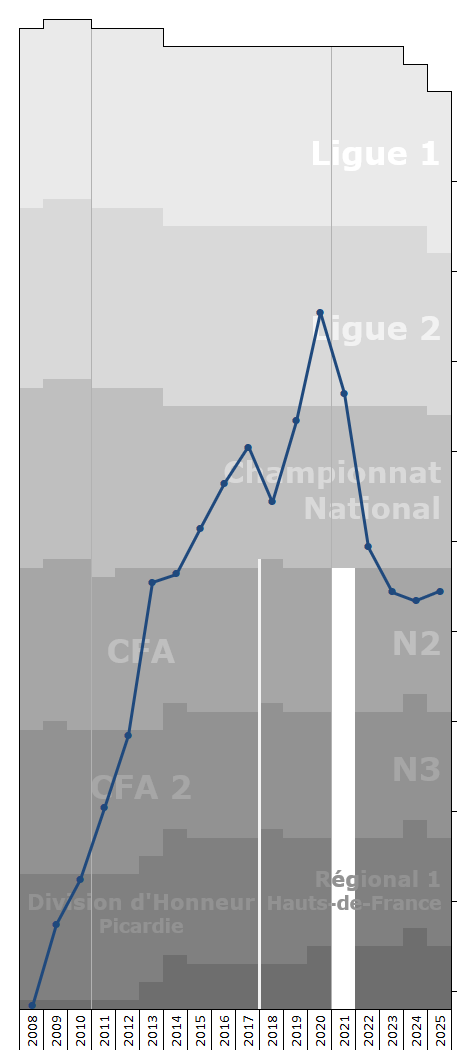
Historical league performance chart of FC Chambly

== Players ==
=== Current squad ===
As of 10 April, 2026

Note: Flags indicate national team as defined under FIFA eligibility rules; some limited exceptions apply. Players may hold more than one non-FIFA nationality.

No.	Pos.	Nation	Player
1	GK	GLP	Rubens Adélaïde
3	DF	ALB	Dorian Zhuri
4	DF	FRA	Andrea Marques
5	DF	FRA	Adrien Pagerie
6	MF	FRA	Dylan N'Zeza
8	MF	GLP	Johan Rotsen
9	FW	FRA	Anthony Petrilli
10	MF	GAB	Brimau Nziengui
11	FW	GLP	Geoffray Durbant
13	MF	FRA	Léon Delpech
14	DF	FRA	Yohan Baret

No.	Pos.	Nation	Player
17	DF	FRA	Maxime Da Veiga
18	FW	CIV	Zanga Koné (on loan from Boulogne)
19	FW	FRA	Bilal Marhdaoui
20	DF	FRA	Ababacar Paye
21	MF	FRA	Antoine Valério
22	FW	GUI	Sadio Amadou Diallo
25	DF	FRA	Quentin Damo
28	MF	FRA	Alex Diliberto
29	DF	FRA	Thibault Jaques
30	GK	FRA	Simon Pontdemé
