= 2020–21 Coupe de France =

Football tournament season

Tournament details
- Country: France
- Teams: 7,378

Final positions
- Champions: Paris Saint-Germain (14th title)
- Runners-up: Monaco

Tournament statistics
- Top goal scorer: Kylian Mbappé (7 goals)

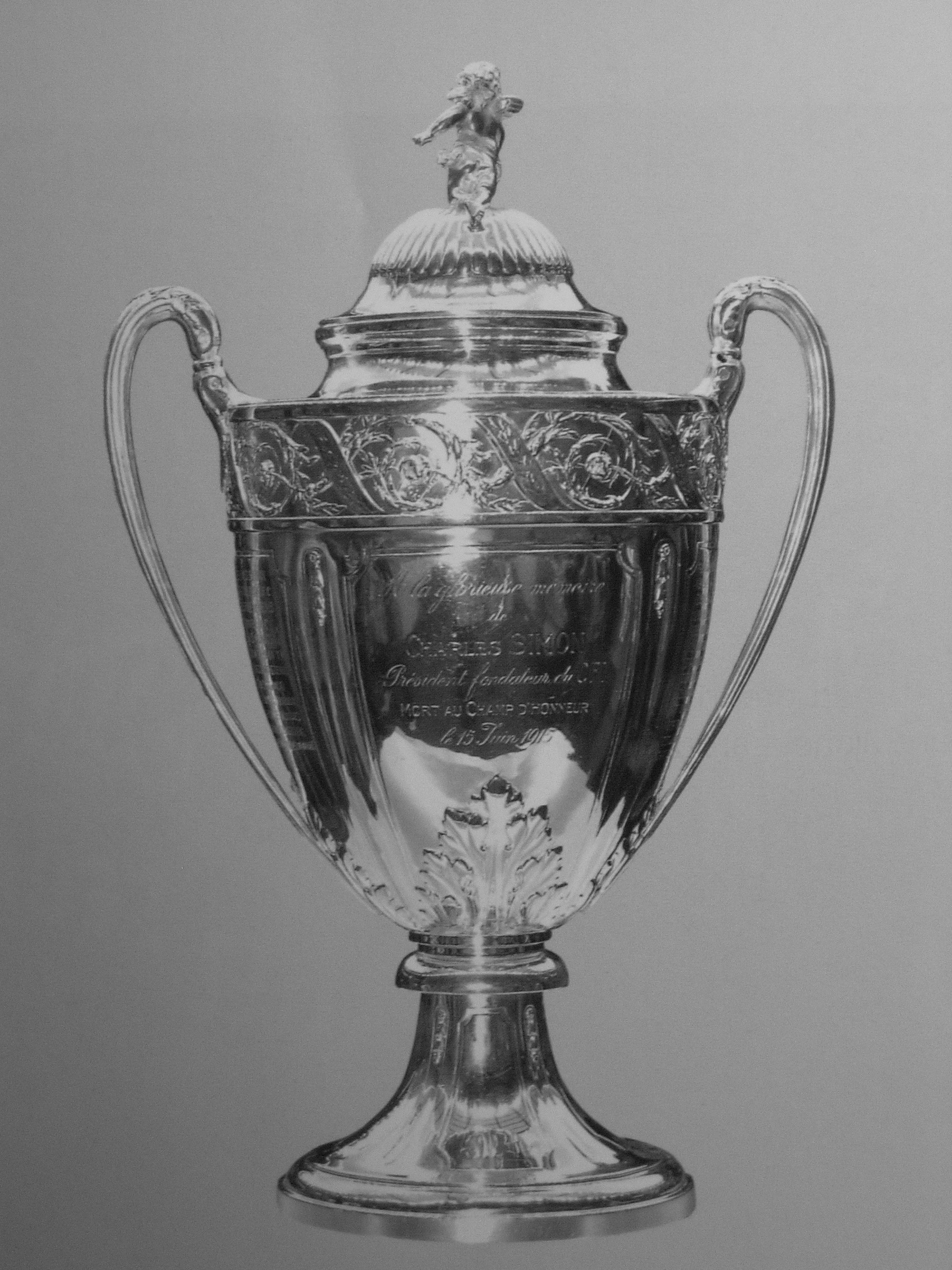
Coupe de France trophy

The 2020–21 Coupe de France was the 104th season of the main football cup competition of France. The competition was organised by the French Football Federation (FFF) and is normally open to all clubs in French football, as well as clubs from the overseas departments and territories (Guadeloupe, French Guiana, Martinique, Mayotte, New Caledonia, Tahiti, Réunion, Saint Martin, and Saint Pierre and Miquelon). Due to the travel restrictions related to the COVID-19 pandemic, the club from Saint Pierre and Miquelon did not progress beyond the second round (Note: By regulation, the winning club of second round of the Saint Pierre and Miquelon regional draw qualify for the third round of Pays de la Loire regional draw; but travel restrictions prevented the team from Saint Pierre and Miquelon making the trip.) and qualifying clubs from New Caledonia and Tahiti did not participate.

The competition was paused on 28 October 2020, when France entered a second period of lockdown due to the COVID-19 pandemic. On 17 December, the FFF announced a new format to allow the competition to complete. On 22 December, the FFF announced a plan to resume the competition from 31 January 2021.

On 19 January 2021, the FFF produced a new calendar for the amateur path and the final stages.

Paris Saint-Germain were the defending champions, and they won a record fourteenth title with a 2–0 win over Monaco in the final.

== Dates ==
Dates for the first two qualifying round were set by the individual Regional leagues. The original calendar had the remaining qualifying rounds, the seventh and eight round, and the round of 64 taking place on weekends. The later rounds up to, but not including, the final, would take place on midweek evenings. The final would take place on Saturday 24 April 2021.

On 28 October 2020, French President Emmanuel Macron announced a second COVID-19 lockdown, including the suspension of all amateur football, for four weeks. The following day, the FFF confirmed the suspension of senior football at all levels below Championnat National. This caused the suspension of the competition, and the postponement of the sixth round and remaining fifth round matches. On 17 November, the FFF formally announced the postponement of the seventh and eighth rounds until January 2021.

On 22 December, the FFF announced a plan to resume the competition on 31 January 2021, subject to COVID-19 restrictions being removed as planned.

On 19 January 2021, the ministère des sports gave the go-ahead for amateur clubs involved in the competition to resume training, and the FFF produced a new calendar for the amateur path and the final stages.

Round	Amateur path	Professional path
Third round	19–20 September 2020	N/A
Fourth round	3–4 October 2020	N/A
Fifth round	17–18 October 2020	N/A
Sixth round	30–31 January 2021	N/A
Seventh round	6–7 February 2021	N/A
Eighth round	13–14 February 2021	19–20 January 2021
Round of 64	20–21 February 2021	9–11 February 2021
Round of 32	5–8 March 2021	
Round of 16	17 March / 6–8 April 2021	
Quarter-finals	20–21 April 2021	
Semi-finals	12–13 May 2021	
Final	19 May 2021	

== Notable rule changes ==
Following the changes introduced regarding Guadeloupe, French Guiana and Martinique last year, teams from Réunion and Mayotte also played an internal match in the seventh round. This meant an additional team qualifying for the seventh round from Mayotte.

Ligue 2 sides joined the competition at the eighth round, a change which the FFF stated was only for this season's competition. This meant fewer teams would qualify from each region's preliminary rounds.

Other than the final, there was no extra time in fixtures this season. Tied matches were settled by a penalty shoot-out after ninety minutes.

On 22 October 2020, the FFF announced that clubs from New Caledonia and Tahiti would not participate in the seventh round due to the ongoing COVID-19 situation. Two clubs were awarded byes to the eighth round. A decision was to follow on 12 November regarding other overseas teams participating in the eighth round.

On 25 November, the FFF announced that the seventh round winners from Réunion, Guadeloupe, Mayotte and French Guiana would play their eighth round matches against each other in December, rather than being integrated into the main eighth round draw when the competition restarts. The competition in Martinique would restart at the seventh round when the mainland tournament restarts.

On 17 December, the FFF announced a change of format to avoid cancelling the competition due to a lack of available dates. The competition would be divided into two parts: A professional path, involving teams from Ligue 1 and Ligue 2, and an amateur path, involving mainland teams qualifying from the preliminary rounds and the overseas qualifiers. The amateur path was straight knockout over two rounds (seventh, eighth), taking 124 qualifiers down to 31. The three overseas qualifiers re-joined the competition for the round of 64, resulting in seventeen qualifiers at the end of the path. The professional path started at the eighth round with the twenty Ligue 2 teams. The winners were then joined by the twenty Ligue 1 teams for the round of 64, resulting in fifteen qualifiers at the end of the path. The two paths joined for the Round of 32, and the rest of the competition was straight knockout.

== Teams ==
=== Round 1 to 6 ===
The first six rounds, and any preliminaries required, were organised by the Regional Leagues and the Overseas Territories, who allowed teams from within their league structure to enter at any point up to the third round. Teams from Championnat National 3 entered at the third round, those from Championnat National 2 entered at the fourth round and those from Championnat National entered at the fifth round.

The number of teams entering at each qualifying round was as follows:

Region	Prelim	First	Second	Third	Fourth	Fifth
Nouvelle-Aquitaine	132	488	35	12	4	0
Pays de la Loire	300	140	41	34	2	3
Centre-Val de Loire	178	59	0	11	6	1
Corsica			6	16	1	2
Bourgogne-Franche-Comté	6	373	0	12	3	0
Grand Est		934	5	12	4	0
Méditerranée	96	88	24	8	7	0
Occitanie		496	0	10	3	1
Hauts-de-France		982	49	10	2	1
Normandy	82	275	20	11	2	2
Brittany		666	1	11	3	2
Paris IDF	248	126	94	11	8	2
Auvergne-Rhône-Alpes	370	475	48	37	7	4
Réunion				16	0	0
Mayotte	8	48	12	0	0	0
Guadeloupe			32	16	0	0
Martinique			44	10	0	0
French Guiana				32	0	0
Saint Pierre and Miquelon		2	1 (Note: winner entered into the Pays-de-la-Loire draw)			
Total	1420	5152	412	269	52	18

=== Round 7 ===
124 qualifiers from the Regional Leagues were joined by the ten qualifiers from the Overseas Territories.

==== Regional Leagues ====
Nouvelle Aquitaine (11 teams)

- Trélissac-Antonne Périgord FC (4)
- Genêts Anglet (5)
- Aviron Bayonnais FC (5)
- US Lège Cap Ferret (5)
- FC Libourne (5)
- Stade Poitevin FC (5)
- FCE Mérignac Arlac (6)
- OL Saint-Liguaire Niort (6)
- AS Aixoise (7)
- AS Panazol (7)
- Association Saint-Laurent Billère (9)

Pays de la Loire (9 teams)

- Stade Lavallois (3)
- Voltigeurs de Châteaubriant (4)
- Les Herbiers VF (4)
- US Changé (5)
- Vendée Fontenay Foot (5)
- US Philbertine Football (5)
- Sablé FC (5)
- Olympique Saumur FC (5)
- Élan de Gorges Foot (7)

Centre-Val de Loire (4 teams)

- US Orléans (3)
- Bourges 18 (4)
- SO Romorantin (4)
- Tours FC (5)

Corsica (2 teams)

- Gazélec Ajaccio (4)
- AS Furiani-Agliani (5)

Bourgogne-Franche-Comté (7 teams)

- ASM Belfort (4)
- Jura Sud Foot (4)
- Louhans-Cuiseaux FC (4)
- Racing Besançon (5)
- CA Pontarlier (5)
- Union Cosnoise Sportive (6)
- UF Mâconnais (6)

Grand Est (16 teams)

- SAS Épinal (4)
- FCSR Haguenau (4)
- SC Schiltigheim (4)
- CS Sedan Ardennes (4)
- CSO Amnéville (5)
- AS Prix-lès-Mézières (5)
- FC Saint-Louis Neuweg (5)
- ES Thaon (5)
- FC Soleil Bischheim (6)
- FC Obermodern (6)
- EF Reims Sainte-Anne Châtillons (6)
- FC Saint-Meziery (6)
- SSEP Hombourg-Haut (7)
- AS Ribeauvillé (7)
- FCO Strasbourg Koenigshoffen 06 (7)
- AS Portugais Saint-Francois Thionville (7)

Méditerranée (4 teams)

- Aubagne FC (4)
- Athlético Marseille (5)
- AS Maximoise (6)
- ES Saint-Zacharie (6)

Occitanie (9 teams)

- Canet Roussillon FC (4)
- US Colomiers Football (4)
- Olympique Alès (5)
- AS Fabrègues (5)
- Castelnau Le Crès FC (6)
- FC Marssac-Rivières-Senouillac Rives du Tarn (6)
- Onet-le-Château (6)
- Entente Saint-Clément-Montferrier (6)
- Montauban FCTG (7)

Hauts-de-France (18 teams)

- US Boulogne (3)
- AS Beauvais Oise (4)
- Olympique Saint-Quentin (4)
- AC Amiens (5)
- US Chantilly (5)
- Olympique Marcquois Football (5)
- US Saint-Omer (5)
- Arras FA (6)
- Écureuils Itancourt-Neuville (6)
- ES Lambresienne (6)
- US Laon (6)
- US Lesquin (6)
- ESC Longueau (6)
- FC Loon-Plage (6)
- US Saint-Maurice Loos-en-Gohelle (6)
- AS Steenvorde (6)
- OS Aire-sur-la-Lys (7)
- SC Bailleulois (8)

Normandy (7 teams)

- US Avranches (3)
- US Quevilly-Rouen (3)
- FC Rouen (4)
- AG Caennaise (5)
- AF Virois (5)
- ESM Gonfreville (6)
- ESFC Falaise (7)

Brittany (12 teams)

- Stade Briochin (3)
- US Saint-Malo (4)
- Stade Plabennécois (4)
- Vannes OC (4)
- Dinan-Léhon FC (5)
- Plouzané AC (5)
- Saint-Colomban Sportive Locminé (5)
- Saint-Pierre de Milizac (5)
- FC Guichen (6)
- US Liffré (6)
- US Montagnarde (6)
- EA Saint-Renan (6)

Paris-Île-de-France (9 teams)

- US Créteil-Lusitanos (3)
- Red Star FC (3)
- Football Club 93 Bobigny-Bagnolet-Gagny (4)
- FC Fleury 91 (4)
- US Lusitanos Saint-Maur (4)
- JA Drancy (5)
- Saint-Brice FC (6)
- US Sénart-Moissy (6)
- CA Vitry (6)

Auvergne-Rhône-Alpes (16 teams)

- Annecy FC (3)
- FC Villefranche (3)
- Andrézieux-Bouthéon FC (4)
- FC Chamalières (4)
- Le Puy Foot 43 Auvergne (4)
- Moulins Yzeure Foot (4)
- GFA Rumilly-Vallières (4)
- AS Saint-Priest (4)
- FC Aurillac Arpajon Cantal Auvergne (5)
- FC Limonest Saint-Didier (5)
- Thonon Évian FC (5)
- US Feurs (6)
- FC Rhône Vallées (6)
- AC Seyssinet (6)
- Vénissieux FC (6)
- AS Nord Vignoble (8)

==== Overseas Territories teams ====
Mayotte: 2 teams

- FC Mtsapéré
- Pamandzi SC

Réunion: 2 teams

- JS Saint-Pierroise
- US Sainte-Marienne

Martinique: 2 teams

- AS Samaritaine
- Club Franciscain

Guadeloupe: 2 teams

- Phare du Canal
- Unité Sainte-Rosienne
French Guiana: 2 teams
- US Sinnamary
- ASU Grand Santi

=== Round 8 ===
==== Overseas teams ====
Two matches between teams from Mayotte, Guadeloupe, Réunion and French Guiana. The team from Martinique received a bye.

==== Amateur path ====
The 62 qualifiers from the seventh round played a straight knockout round.

==== Professional path ====
The 20 Ligue 2 teams joined the competition, and played a straight knockout round.

=== Round of 64 ===
==== Amateur path ====
The 31 qualifiers from the eighth round were joined by the two overseas teams qualifying from the eighth round, and the team from Martinique. They played a straight knockout round. Following petition by the Ligue de Football de Martinique, the team from Martinique were guaranteed a draw against one of the qualifying overseas teams.

==== Professional path ====
The ten Ligue 2 qualifiers from the eighth round were joined by the twenty Ligue 1 sides. They played a straight knockout round.

=== Round of 32, and later ===
The seventeen amateur path qualifiers and the fifteen professional path qualifiers joined for a straight knockout competition.

== Seventh round ==
The seventh round was split over an extended period, starting on 21 November 2020.

- Playoff ties between teams from the overseas leagues of Guadeloupe, French Guiana and Mayotte took place between 21 and 29 November.
- The playoff tie between teams from Martinique took place on 13 January 2021.
- The matches involving the 124 qualifying teams from mainland France took place entirely within the regional leagues, except for those leagues providing an odd number of qualifiers, where inter-league matches were drawn. This resulted in ties between Nouvelle-Aquitaine and Occitanie, Normandy and Pays de la Loire, and Bourgogne-Franche-Comté and Paris-Île-de-France. The pre-draw was published on 22 January. Matches took place on 5, 6 and 7 February 2021, with three postponed to 13 and 14 February, awaiting outcomes of ties in the previous round.

=== Overseas ties ===
21 November 2020	Pamandzi SC (Mayotte)	0–2	(Mayotte) FC Mtsapéré	Mamoudzou, Mayotte
14:00 (UTC+03:00)		Report	Madi Ali 10' (pen.), 75'	Stadium: Stade Cavani; Attendance: 0

21 November 2020	Phare du Canal (Guadeloupe)	1–0	(Guadeloupe) Unité Sainte-Rosienne	Les Abymes, Guadeloupe
20:00 (UTC-04:00)	Charleston 80'	Report		Stadium: Stade René Serge Nabajoth; Attendance: 0

21 November 2020	JS Saint-Pierroise (Réunion)	2–2 (3–2 p)	(Réunion) US Sainte-Marienne	Saint-Paul, Réunion
20:30 (UTC+04:00)	Papin 20', 84'	Report	Fabrice 32', 89'	Stadium: Stade Paul Julius Bénard; Attendance: 0

29 November 2020	ASU Grand Santi (French Guiana)	0–2	(French Guiana) US Sinnamary	Remire-Montjoly, French Guiana
15:30 (UTC-03:00)		Report	Abionie 21'; Jonel 43'	Stadium: Stade Municipal Dr. Edmard Lama; Attendance: 0

13 January 2021	Club Franciscain (Martinique)	2–0	(Martinique) AS Samaritaine	Fort-de-France, Martinique
20:00 (UTC-04:00)	Jougon 23'; Thimon 50'	Report		Stadium: Stade Pierre Aliker; Attendance: 4,000

=== Mainland ties ===
==== Auvergne-Rhône-Alpes group ====
7 February 2021	Le Puy Foot 43 Auvergne (4)	4–2	FC Aurillac Arpajon Cantal Auvergne (5)	Le Puy-en-Velay
13:30 CET	Bosetti 21', 53'; Boujedra 29', 87'	Report	Coldefy 40'; Bouzou 48'	Stadium: Stade Charles Massot; Attendance: 0 Referee: Jacques Salze

7 February 2021	AS Nord Vignoble (8)	1–2	US Feurs (6)	Besson
13:00 CET	Perot 30'	Report	Lornage 34', 62'	Stadium: Stade Municipal; Attendance: 0 Referee: Tawbane Kani

7 February 2021	FC Chamalières (4)	0–0 (5–4 p)	Moulins Yzeure Foot (4)	Chamalières
14:00 CET		Report		Stadium: Complexe Sportif Claude Wolff; Attendance: 0 Referee: Willy Bertolotti

6 February 2021	Andrézieux-Bouthéon FC (4)	4–0	FC Villefranche (3)	Andrézieux-Bouthéon
14:00 CET	Diallo 36'; Pacheron 62' (pen.); Desmartin 81'; Cabaton 86'	Report		Stadium: L'Envol Stadium; Attendance: 0 Referee: Romain Perpinan

7 February 2021	Thonon Évian FC (5)	2–3	Vénissieux FC (6)	Thonon-les-Bains
13:00 CET	Chaïbi 12' (pen.); Keita 23'	Report	Nsonde 47'; Antoine 50'; Guelbi 79'	Stadium: Stade Joseph-Moynat; Attendance: 0 Referee: Edgar Barenton

6 February 2021	AC Seyssinet (6)	0–4	Annecy FC (3)	Seyssinet-Pariset
14:30 CET		Report	Genty 63' (o.g.); Le Tallec 67' (pen.); Fillon 71'; Bensaber 82'	Stadium: Stade Joseph Guétat; Attendance: 0 Referee: Brice Bayour

7 February 2021	FC Limonest Saint-Didier (5)	0–0 (5–6 p)	GFA Rumilly-Vallières (4)	Limonest
13:30 CET		Report		Stadium: Stade Courtois Fillot; Attendance: 0 Referee: Matthieu Bonnetin

7 February 2021	FC Rhône Vallées (6)	0–2	AS Saint-Priest (4)	Le Pouzin
13:30 CET		Report	Charveys 43'; Perracino 45'	Stadium: Stade Municipal Emile Dupau; Attendance: 0 Referee: Valentin Ougier

==== Brittany group ====
6 February 2021	Stade Briochin (3)	3–0	Vannes OC (4)	Saint-Brieuc
13:30 CET	Kyei 8', 49'; Illien 89'	Report		Stadium: Fred-Aubert Stadium; Attendance: 0 Referee: Paul Garo

7 February 2021	US Saint-Malo (4)	4–2	Stade Plabennécois (4)	Saint-Malo
13:30 CET	Iva 24'; Fdaouch 62'; Foulon 73'; Debreux 85'	Report	Gerbeaud 80' (pen.), 90' (pen.)	Stadium: Stade de Marville; Attendance: 0 Referee: Jean Francois Eveno

7 February 2021	US Liffré (6)	1–4	US Montagnarde (6)	Liffré
13:30 CET	Le Scornet 58' (pen.)	Report	Rouzic 12'; Blayo 29', 45'; Barry 90'	Stadium: Stade Jules Ferry; Attendance: 0 Referee: Kevin Gueguen

7 February 2021	Saint-Pierre de Milizac (5)	1–1 (2–4 p)	Dinan-Léhon FC (5)	Milizac-Guipronvel
13:30 CET	Kerzil 85'	Report	Vermet 79'	Stadium: Stade Pen-ar-Guéar; Attendance: 0 Referee: Quentin Fourel

7 February 2021	Saint-Colomban Sportive Locminé (5)	5–2	EA Saint-Renan (6)	Locminé
13:30 CET	Lushima 31'; Soufaché 40'; Danso 50', 70'; Rio 62'	Report	Marzin 11'; Le Fourn 57'	Stadium: Stade du Pigeon Blanc; Attendance: 0 Referee: Maxime Jamet

7 February 2021	Plouzané AC (5)	1–2	FC Guichen (6)	Plouzané
13:30 CET	D. Soilihi 23'	Report	Mbock 55'; Berregard 90' (o.g.)	Stadium: Stade de Trémaïdic; Attendance: 0 Referee: Romain Beneteau

==== Centre-Val de Loire group ====
6 February 2021	US Orléans (3)	2–2 (6–5 p)	Bourges 18 (4)	Orléans
13:30 CET	Saint-Ruf 58'; Coulibaly 71'	Report	Guedioura 20'; El Atalati 76'	Stadium: Stade de la Source; Attendance: 0 Referee: Lucas Baudon

7 February 2021	SO Romorantin (4)	1–0	Tours FC (5)	Romorantin-Lanthenay
13:30 CET	Ouhammou 28'	Report		Stadium: Stade Jules Ladoumègue; Attendance: 0 Referee: Anthony Junges

==== Grand Est group ====
7 February 2021	AS Ribeauvillé (7)	0–3	FC Soleil Bischheim (6)	Ribeauvillé
13:30 CET		Report	Laprevotte 43'; Modenese 57'; Cicutta 84'	Stadium: Stade Pierre de Coubertin; Attendance: 0 Referee: Maxence Richard

7 February 2021	FC Obermodern (6)	0–0 (6–7 p)	SC Schiltigheim (4)	Obermodern-Zutzendorf
14:00 CET		Report		Stadium: Stade Municipal; Attendance: 0 Referee: Stanislas Rueff

7 February 2021	FCO Strasbourg Koenigshoffen 06 (7)	1–2	FCSR Haguenau (4)	Strasbourg
14:00 CET	Oliveira Malucha 68'	Report	Bekoé 6'; Madihi 90' (pen.)	Stadium: Stade de la Rotonde; Attendance: 0 Referee: Victoria Beyer

7 February 2021	SSEP Hombourg-Haut (7)	1–1 (8–9 p)	FC Saint-Louis Neuweg (5)	Hombourg-Haut
13:30 CET	Morabit 68'	Report	Guèye 70'	Stadium: Stade Gouvy; Attendance: 0 Referee: Sylvain Thullier

6 February 2021	CS Sedan Ardennes (4)	2–1	SAS Épinal (4)	Sedan
14:00 CET	Ramalingom 13'; Bekhechi 62'	Report	Gendrey 25'	Stadium: Stade Louis Dugauguez; Attendance: 0 Referee: Antony Pacheco

7 February 2021	FC Saint-Meziery (6)	0–0 (5–4 p)	EF Reims Sainte-Anne Châtillons (6)	Saint-Mesmin
13:30 CET		Report		Stadium: Parc des Sports Hubert Clercy; Attendance: 0 Referee: Christophe Tani

7 February 2021	AS Portugais Saint-Francois Thionville (7)	0–3	CSO Amnéville (5)	Thionville
13:30 CET		Report	Pignatone 49'; Poinsignon 57'; Maurice 78'	Stadium: Stade de la Plaine; Attendance: 0 Referee: Mathias Roth

7 February 2021	AS Prix-lès-Mézières (5)	2–1	ES Thaon (5)	Prix-lès-Mézières
13:30 CET	Thioune 12'; Dezothez 76'	Report	Samba 80'	Stadium: Stade de la Poterie; Attendance: 0 Referee: Kevin Markiewicz

==== Hauts-de-France group ====
See also the combined Hauts-de-France and Corsica group

7 February 2021	OS Aire-sur-la-Lys (7)	1–1 (4–2 p)	US Chantilly (5)	Aire-sur-la-Lys
13:00 CET	Guilbert 21' (pen.)	Report	El Farissi 10' (pen.)	Stadium: Parc des Sports Paul Nestier; Attendance: 0 Referee: Kevin Six

7 February 2021	US Lesquin (6)	0–4	AC Amiens (5)	Lesquin
13:30 CET		Report	Martinez 7' (pen.); Khelif 44'; Jeno 46', 50'	Stadium: Stade Jean-Pierre Papin; Attendance: 0 Referee: Clement Visbecq

7 February 2021	FC Loon-Plage (6)	1–0	Écureuils Itancourt-Neuville (6)	Loon-Plage
13:30 CET	Debordeaux 29'	Report		Stadium: Stade Marcel Rosseel; Attendance: 0 Referee: Guillaume Levecque

7 February 2021	Arras FA (6)	2–1	Olympique Saint-Quentin (4)	Arras
13:30 CET	J. Tourelot 36'; Ndzie 65'	Report	Modeste 61'	Stadium: Degouve-Brabant Stadium; Attendance: 0 Referee: Damien Rossini

6 February 2021	Olympique Marcquois Football (5)	2–3	US Boulogne (3)	Marcq-en-Barœul
15:00 CET	Vancauwenberge 42'; Dansoko 90+1'	Report	Mendy 13', 67'; Okou 89'	Stadium: Stade Georges Niquet; Attendance: 0 Referee: Charlie Sorel

7 February 2021	ES Lambresienne (6)	4–0	US Laon (6)	Lambres-lez-Douai
13:30 CET	Diagne 22', 63'; Halluin 28'; Ahoure 55'	Report		Stadium: Stade Robert Drecourt; Attendance: 0 Referee: Loann Darcy

7 February 2021	SC Bailleulois (8)	1–2	AS Steenvorde (6)	Bailleul
13:30 CET	K. Six 29'	Report	Carpentier 40' (pen.); El Mesbahi 82'	Stadium: Stade Charles Lesage; Attendance: 0 Referee: Valentin Cardon

7 February 2021	ESC Longueau (6)	1–3	AS Beauvais Oise (4)	Longueau
13:30 CET	Dobelle 66'	Report	Haddou 20'; Doré 29'; Rodrigo 77'	Stadium: Stade Émile Noël; Attendance: 0 Referee: Yann Flament

==== Combined Hauts-de-France and Corsica group ====
The two qualifiers from Corsica were grouped with the qualifiers from the last two games in the Hauts-de-France sixth round draw to ensure two qualifiers for the eighth round and one qualifier for the round of 64.

7 February 2021	US Saint-Maurice Loos-en-Gohelle (6)	0–0 (5–6 p)	US Saint-Omer (5)	Loos-en-Gohelle
13:30 CET		Report		Stadium: Stade Éric Sikora; Attendance: 0 Referee: Julien Grimaud

7 February 2021	Gazélec Ajaccio (4)	2–2 (4–3 p)	AS Furiani-Agliani (5)	Ajaccio
14:00 CET	Lopy 3'; Guerbert 21'	Report	Romain 30', 60'	Stadium: Stade Ange Casanova; Attendance: 0 Referee: Valentin Giorgetti

==== Méditerranée group ====
7 February 2021	ES Saint-Zacharie (6)	0–0 (3–5 (Note: The result of the penalty shoot-out was originally given opposite, due to the referee incorrectly completing the electronic scoresheet. It was corrected on 8 February 2021.) p)	Athlético Marseille (5)	Saint-Zacharie
14:00 CET		Report		Stadium: Stade François Coulomb; Attendance: 0 Referee: Steven Llewellyn

7 February 2021	AS Maximoise (6)	1–3	Aubagne FC (4)	Sainte-Maxime
14:00 CET	Esposito 44'	Report	El Faqyh 63'; Gomis 69' (pen.); Gandi 90'	Stadium: Stade Gérard Rossi; Attendance: 0 Referee: Louis Lungeri

==== Combined Nouvelle-Aquitaine and Occitanie group ====
The qualifiers from Nouvelle-Aquitaine were grouped with the qualifiers from the last game in the Occitanie sixth round draw to ensure six qualifiers for the eighth round and three qualifiers for the round of 64.

7 February 2021	FC Libourne (5)	2–2 (2–3 p)	US Lège Cap Ferret (5)	Libourne
13:30 CET	Pinto 3'; Castera 76'	Report	Valadie 88'; Fall 90'	Stadium: Stade Jean-Antoine Moueix; Attendance: 0 Referee: Lakhdar El Bedoui

7 February 2021	Association Saint-Laurent Billère (9)	0–1	Aviron Bayonnais FC (5)	Billère
14:00 CET		Report	Chort 89'	Stadium: Stade Georges Hugot; Attendance: 0 Referee: Gael Gratianne

7 February 2021	FCE Mérignac Arlac (6)	1–0	AS Aixoise (7)	Mérignac
13:00 CET	Rafa 21'	Report		Stadium: Stade Joseph Antoine Cruchon; Attendance: 0 Referee: Aurelien Grizon

7 February 2021	Genêts Anglet (5)	0–1	Stade Poitevin FC (5)	Anglet
15:00 CET		Report	Damessi 26'	Stadium: Stade Saint-Jean; Attendance: 0 Referee: Aurelien Faivre

7 February 2021	OL Saint-Liguaire Niort (6)	0–0 (5–4 p)	Trélissac-Antonne Périgord FC (4)	Niort
14:00 CET		Report		Stadium: Stade de Saint-Liguaire; Attendance: 0 Referee: Guillaume Bousquet

7 February 2021	AS Panazol (7)	0–3	Olympique Alès (5)	Panazol
14:00 CET		Report	El Bakkal 60', 65'; Sbai 90' (pen.)	Stadium: Stade de Morpiènas; Attendance: 0 Referee: Pierre Retail

==== Occitanie group ====
7 February 2021	Entente Saint-Clément-Montferrier (6)	2–1	FC Marssac-Rivières-Senouillac Rives du Tarn (6)	Montferrier-sur-Lez
13:30 CET	Bouida 33'; Pinto 89'	Report	Saez 30' (o.g.)	Stadium: Stade Ernest Brousse; Attendance: 0 Referee: Cedric Mouysset

7 February 2021	US Colomiers Football (4)	1–1 (6–7 p)	Canet Roussillon FC (4)	Colomiers
13:30 CET	Cardinali 6'	Report	Posteraro 48'	Stadium: Complexe Sportif Capitany; Attendance: 0 Referee: Julien Schmitt

7 February 2021	AS Fabrègues (5)	1–0	Onet-le-Château (6)	Fabrègues
14:00 CET	Yagousseti 75'	Report		Stadium: Stade Joseph Jeanton; Attendance: 0 Referee: Soulaimane Chamel

7 February 2021	Castelnau Le Crès FC (6)	2–0	Montauban FCTG (7)	Le Crès
14:00 CET	Loisel 39'; Chirac 62'	Report		Stadium: Stade Roland Gamet; Attendance: 0 Referee: Jordane Lomi

==== Combined Paris-Île-de-France and Bourgogne-Franche-Comté group ====
The nine qualifiers from Paris-Île-de-France and the seven qualifiers from Bourgogne-Franche-Comté were grouped together to ensure eight qualifiers for the eighth round and four qualifiers for the round of 64.

6 February 2021	US Créteil-Lusitanos (3)	4–2	US Lusitanos Saint-Maur (4)	Créteil
14:00 CET	Sawadogo 1', 69'; Belkouche 23'; Farade 58'	Report	Fernandes 32'; Daninthe 76'	Stadium: Stade Dominique Duvauchelle; Attendance: 0 Referee: Gabriel Henry

13 February 2021	Red Star FC (3)	1–0	Football Club 93 Bobigny-Bagnolet-Gagny (4)	Saint-Ouen-sur-Seine
14:00 CET	Gomel 90'	Report		Stadium: Stade Bauer; Attendance: 0 Referee: Julien Reynet

7 February 2021	CA Vitry (6)	0–4	Saint-Brice FC (6)	Vitry-sur-Seine
13:30 CET		Report	Ongmakon 15'; Mafouta 54', 70' (pen.); N'Diaye 83'	Stadium: Stade Roger Couderc; Attendance: 0 Referee: Julien Reynet

7 February 2021	JA Drancy (5)	2–0	US Sénart-Moissy (6)	Drancy
13:30 CET	Go 65', 83'	Report		Stadium: Stade Paul André; Attendance: 0 Referee: Cyril Dell Angela

7 February 2021	Jura Sud Foot (4)	1–1 (4–5 p)	Racing Besançon (5)	Chassal-Molinges
13:00 CET	Kabeya 32'	Report	Fofana 90'	Stadium: Stade Édouard Guillon; Attendance: 0 Referee: Maxim Plat

7 February 2021	UF Mâconnais (6)	2–1	Union Cosnoise Sportive (6)	Mâcon
13:30 CET	Thoumin 19'; Vannet 78'	Report	Duarte 85'	Stadium: Stade Pierre Guérin; Attendance: 0 Referee: Alexis Guillon

7 February 2021	ASM Belfort (4)	1–3	Louhans-Cuiseaux FC (4)	Belfort
14:00 CET	Gaye 81' (o.g.)	Report	Larose 8'; Cissé 23'; Gaye 52'	Stadium: Stade Roger Serzian; Attendance: 0 Referee: Quentin Pourchot

7 February 2021	CA Pontarlier (5)	0–3	FC Fleury 91 (4)	Pontarlier
13:30 CET		Report	Petrilli 11'; Mangonzo 75'; Gamiette 90'	Stadium: Stade André Hammerli; Attendance: 0 Referee: Gaetan Korbas

==== Combined Pays de la Loire and Normandy group ====
The nine qualifiers from Pays de la Loire and the seven qualifiers from Normandy were grouped together to ensure eight qualifiers for the eighth round and four qualifiers for the round of 64.

14 February 2021	Élan de Gorges Foot (7)	0–0 (2–3 p)	Sablé FC (5)	Gorges
13:30 CET		Report		Stadium: Stade Maujouan du Gasset; Attendance: 0 Referee: Thomas Rocaboy

7 February 2021	Olympique Saumur FC (5)	0–0 (4–2 p)	Vendée Fontenay Foot (5)	Saumur
13:30 CET				Stadium: Stade des Rives du Thouet; Attendance: 0 Referee: Victor Simonneaux

7 February 2021	US Changé (5)	0–1	Les Herbiers VF (4)	Changé
13:30 CET		Report	Grellier 34'	Stadium: Stade Auguste Dalibard; Attendance: 0 Referee: Kevin Barbin

13 February 2021	US Philbertine Football (5)	1–3	Stade Lavallois (3)	Saint-Philbert-de-Grand-Lieu
13:30 CET	Zainek 53'	Report	Taha 40'; Simbakoli 43'; Robinet 63'	Stadium: Complexe Sportif des Chevrets; Attendance: 0 Referee: Brendan Roffet

5 February 2021	US Quevilly-Rouen (3)	3–2	US Avranches (3)	Le Petit-Quevilly
18:00 CET	Remars 12'; Jung 51'; Pinson 90'	Report	Essende 54'; Anziani 58'	Stadium: Stade Robert Diochon; Attendance: 0 Referee: Yohan Gagnant

7 February 2021	FC Rouen (4)	3–0	AF Virois (5)	Le Petit-Quevilly
13:30 CET	Diarra 6'; Barthélémy 52'; Abdelmoula 90+3'	Report		Stadium: Stade Robert Diochon; Attendance: 0 Referee: Tifenn Leprodhomme

7 February 2021	ESM Gonfreville (6)	4–0	ESFC Falaise (7)	Gonfreville-l'Orcher
13:30 CET	Kerchouche 16', 77'; Diallo 81'; Mankour 89'	Report		Stadium: Stade Maurice Baquet; Attendance: 0 Referee: Louison Olivier

7 February 2021	AG Caennaise (5)	0–1	Voltigeurs de Châteaubriant (4)	Caen
13:30 CET		Report	Fayolle 46'	Stadium: Stade de Venoix; Attendance: 0 Referee: Emmanuel Caron

== Eighth round ==
The eighth round was separated into two paths. The professional path took place between the twenty teams from Ligue 2. The amateur path took place between the 62 mainland qualifiers from the seventh round. The ties involving teams from Mayotte, Guadeloupe, Réunion and French Guiana were pre-drawn on 25 November 2020. The team from Martinique received a bye for this round and directly qualified for the round of 64 on the amateur path.

- Overseas ties took place on 20 December.
- The draw for the professional path took place on 7 January 2021, with matches played on 19 and 20 January.
- In the amateur path, matches took place entirely within the regional leagues, with the winners of the three inter-league matches from the seventh round joining the region which had an odd number of qualifiers. The pre-draw was published on 22 January 2021. Matches took place on 13 and 14 February, with three postponed pending outcomes of ties in the previous round, and two postponed due to inclement weather.

=== Overseas ties ===
20 December 2020	JS Saint-Pierroise (Réunion)	1–1 (4–5 p)	(Mayotte) FC Mtsapéré	Saint-Pierre, Réunion
15:30 (UTC+04:00)	Rivière 22'	Report	Nokowa 80'	Stadium: Stade Michel Volnay; Attendance: 0

20 December 2020	US Sinnamary (French Guiana)	2–0	(Guadeloupe) Phare du Canal	Remire-Montjoly, French Guiana
16:30 (UTC-03:00)	Aninie 65'; Maabo 90+4'	Report		Stadium: Stade Municipal Dr. Edmard Lama; Attendance: 0

=== Professional path ===
==== Group A ====
19 January 2021	Valenciennes (2)	2–0	Chambly (2)	Valenciennes
18:00 CET	Cabral 8'; Guillaume 17' (pen.)	Report		Stadium: Stade du Hainaut; Referee: Mehdi Mokhtari

19 January 2021	Dunkerque (2)	1–1 (2–4 p)	Amiens (2)	Dunkirk
18:00 CET	Tchokounté 81'	Report	Blin 43'	Stadium: Stade Marcel Tribut; Referee: Sylvain Palhies
	Penalties
	Romil (penalty scored); Dudouit (penalty scored); Bosca (penalty missed); Tchokounté (penalty missed)		(penalty missed) Lomotey; (penalty scored) Sangaré; (penalty scored) Ciss; (penalty scored) Bianchini; (penalty scored) Akolo

==== Group B ====
19 January 2021	Pau (2)	0–0 (7–8 p)	Rodez (2)	Pau
18:00 CET		Report		Stadium: Stade du Hameau; Referee: Pierre Gaillouste
	Penalties
	Armand (penalty missed); Diatta (penalty scored); Ba (penalty scored); Koffi (penalty scored); Ndiaye (penalty scored); Daubin (penalty scored); Zahary (penalty scored); Batisse (penalty scored); Sadzoute (penalty missed)		(penalty scored) Leborgne; (penalty scored) Dieng; (penalty missed) Kerouedan; (penalty scored) David; (penalty scored) Boissier; (penalty scored) Ouhafsa; (penalty scored) Ruffaut; (penalty scored) Roche; (penalty scored) Chougrani

20 January 2021	Toulouse (2)	1–0	Niort (2)	Toulouse
18:00 CET	Bayo 37'	Report		Stadium: Stadium de Toulouse; Referee: Nicolas Rainville

==== Group C ====
19 January 2021	Châteauroux (2)	0–2	Ajaccio (2)	Châteauroux
18:00 CET		Report	Barreto 18'; Courtet 61'	Stadium: Stade Gaston Petit; Referee: Mathieu Vernice

20 January 2021	Clermont (2)	1–1 (2–4 p)	Grenoble (2)	Clermont-Ferrand
13:45 CET	Tell 33'	Report	Djoco 32' (o.g.)	Stadium: Stade Gabriel Montpied; Referee: Olivier Thual
	Penalties
	Berthomier (penalty scored); Allevinah (penalty missed); Magnin (penalty missed); Rajot (penalty scored)		(penalty scored) Tapoko; (penalty scored) Semedo; (penalty scored) Pickel; (penalty scored) Straalman

==== Group D ====
19 January 2021	Auxerre (2)	1–0	Troyes (2)	Auxerre
21:00 CET	Bellugou 58'	Report		Stadium: Stade de l'Abbé-Deschamps; Referee: Romain Delpech

20 January 2021	Nancy (2)	0–1	Sochaux (2)	Nancy
18:30 CET		Report	El Kaoutari 60' (o.g.)	Stadium: Stade Marcel Picot; Referee: Benjamin Lepaysant

==== Group E ====
19 January 2021	Le Havre (2)	0–1	Paris FC (2)	Le Havre
16:00 CET		Report	Martin 8'	Stadium: Stade Océane; Referee: Alexandre Perreau Niel

20 January 2021	Guingamp (2)	1–3	Caen (2)	Guingamp
18:45 CET	M'Changama 90+3'	Report	Deminguet 45+1'; Gioacchini 47'; Mendy 75'	Stadium: Stade du Roudourou; Referee: Romain Lissorgue

=== Amateur path ===
==== Auvergne-Rhône-Alpes group ====
14 February 2021	US Feurs (6)	0–0 (3–4 p)	Le Puy Foot 43 Auvergne (4)	Feurs
13:30 CET		Report		Stadium: Stade Maurice Rousson; Attendance: 0 Referee: Aurelien Saunier

14 February 2021	FC Chamalières (4)	1–1 (5–3 p)	Andrézieux-Bouthéon FC (4)	Chamalières
14:00 CET	Rance 66'	Report	Diallo 9'	Stadium: Complexe Sportif Claude Wolff; Attendance: 0 Referee: Yann Gazagnes

13 February 2021	Vénissieux FC (6)	0–1	Annecy FC (3)	Vénissieux
14:00 CET (Note: Kick-off was delayed by 30 minutes, in order to clear snow from the pitch.)		Report	Mogni 85'	Stadium: Stade Laurent Gérin; Attendance: 0 Referee: Nicolas Brotons

14 February 2021	GFA Rumilly-Vallières (4)	5–1	AS Saint-Priest (4)	Rumilly
13:30 CET	Cottin 12', 79'; Di Stefano 19'; Peuget 35'; Gay 47'	Report	Burban 29'	Stadium: Stade des Grangettes; Attendance: 0 Referee: Edgar Barenton

==== Brittany group ====
16 February 2021	US Saint-Malo (4)	0–2	Stade Briochin (3)	Saint-Malo (Note: Fred-Aubert Stadium was unplayable due to snow on the original date, so according to the rules of this years competition, the tie was reversed and rearranged.)
13:30 CET		Report	Lavigne 62'; Bloudeau 79'	Stadium: Stade de Marville; Attendance: 0 Referee: Quentin Fourel

14 February 2021	US Montagnarde (6)	1–0	Dinan-Léhon FC (5)	Inzinzac-Lochrist
13:30 CET	Blayo 44'	Report		Stadium: Stade Mané Braz, Attendance: 0 Referee: Maxime Jamet

14 February 2021	Saint-Colomban Sportive Locminé (5)	0–1	FC Guichen (6)	Locminé
13:30 CET		Report	Bertin 79'	Stadium: Stade du Pigeon Blanc; Attendance: 0 Referee: Paul Garo

==== Centre-Val de Loire group ====
13 February 2021	US Orléans (3)	1–1 (2–4 p)	SO Romorantin (4)	Orléans
13:30 CET	Antoine 74'	Report	Payet 10'	Stadium: Stade de la Source; Attendance: 0 Referee: Fabien Brun

==== Grand Est group ====
14 February 2021	FC Soleil Bischheim (6)	0–1	SC Schiltigheim (4)	Bischheim
14:00 CET		Report	Socka Bongué 89'	Stadium: Stade Mars; Attendance: 0 Referee: Philippe Lucas

14 February 2021	FCSR Haguenau (4)	2–2 (4–5 p)	FC Saint-Louis Neuweg (5)	Haguenau
14:00 CET	Onwuzurumba 54'; Madihi 68'	Report	Varsovie 9'; Guèye 80'	Stadium: Parc des Sports; Attendance: 0 Referee: Renaud Poitier

14 February 2021	FC Saint-Meziery (6)	0–5	CS Sedan Ardennes (4)	Saint-Mesmin
13:30 CET		Report	Borgniet 6'; Géran 11'; Ramalingom 28', 67'; Quarshie 73'	Stadium: Parc des Sports Hubert Clercy; Attendance: 0 Referee: Gaetan Korbas

14 February 2021	CSO Amnéville (5)	0–0 (4–5 p)	AS Prix-lès-Mézières (5)	Amnéville
13:30 CET		Report		Stadium: Stade Municipal; Attendance: 0 Referee: Geoffrey Kubler

==== Hauts-de-France group ====
See also the combined Hauts-de-France and Corsica group

14 February 2021	OS Aire-sur-la-Lys (7)	0–0 (4–2 p)	AC Amiens (5)	Aire-sur-la-Lys
13:30 CET		Report		Stadium: Parc des Sports Paul Nestier; Attendance: 0 Referee: Valentin Cardon

14 February 2021	FC Loon-Plage (6)	1–1 (4–2 p)	Arras FA (6)	Loon-Plage
13:30 CET	Milliot 25'	Report	Steppé 45'	Stadium: Stade Marcel Rosseel; Attendance: 0 Referee: Charlie Sorrel

16 February 2021	US Boulogne (3)	5–0	ES Lambresienne (6)	Boulogne-sur-Mer (Note: The original game was called off by the referee a few minutes before kick-off, due to a frozen pitch. By the rules of the competition, the tie was reversed and rescheduled for a later date.)
14:00 CET	Abdeldjelil 5', 52'; Moussaki 35'; Derambuyre 63' (o.g.); Idazza 85'	Report		Stadium: Stade de la Libération; Attendance: 0 Referee: Yann Flament

14 February 2021	AS Steenvorde (6)	2–4	AS Beauvais Oise (4)	Steenvorde
13:30 CET	Fontaine 16'; Carpentier 59'	Report	Rodrigo 28'; Fallempin 64', 65'; Haddou 90'	Stadium: Stade Municipal; Attendance: 0 Referee: Emmanuel Caron

==== Combined Hauts-de-France and Corsica group ====
14 February 2021	US Saint-Omer (5)	0–1	Gazélec Ajaccio (4)	Saint-Omer
13:00 CET		Report	Jonville 90+1' (o.g.)	Stadium: Stade Gaston Bonnet; Attendance: 0 Referee: Alexandre Mercier

==== Méditerranée group ====
14 February 2021	Athlético Marseille (5)	0–0 (4–5 p)	Aubagne FC (4)	Aix-en-Provence
14:00 CET		Report		Stadium: Georges-Carcassonne Stadium; Attendance: 0 Referee: Maxime Apruzzese

==== Combined Nouvelle-Aquitaine and Occitanie group ====
14 February 2021	US Lège Cap Ferret (5)	1–0	Aviron Bayonnais FC (5)	Lège-Cap-Ferret
14:00 CET	Eppert 38'	Report		Stadium: Stade Louis Goubet; Attendance: 0

14 February 2021	FCE Mérignac Arlac (6)	1–4	Stade Poitevin FC (5)	Mérignac
13:30 CET	Beddouri 29'	Report	Cuvier 9', 70', 76'; Bisson 49'	Stadium: Stade Joseph Antoine Cruchon; Attendance: 0

14 February 2021	OL Saint-Liguaire Niort (6)	0–2	Olympique Alès (5)	Niort
14:00 CET		Report	Franco 27'; El Bakkal 90'	Stadium: Stade de Saint-Liguaire; Attendance: 0 Referee: Bastien Leray

==== Occitanie group ====
14 February 2021	Entente Saint-Clément-Montferrier (6)	0–2	Canet Roussillon FC (4)	Montferrier-sur-Lez
14:00 CET		Report	Pioton 70'; Gasparotto 75'	Stadium: Stade Ernest Brousse; Attendance: 0 Referee: Jordane Lomi

14 February 2021	AS Fabrègues (5)	4–1	Castelnau Le Crès FC (6)	Fabrègues
13:30 CET	Ouabi 18', 46', 70' (pen.); Lopez 84'	Report	Diouf 75'	Stadium: Stade Joseph Jeanton; Attendance: 0 Referee: Gaetan Martin

==== Combined Paris-Île-de-France and Bourgogne-Franche-Comté group ====
16 February 2021	US Créteil-Lusitanos (3)	1–2	Red Star FC (3)	Créteil
14:00 CET	Pancrate 37'	Report	Ba 4'; Durand 7' (pen.)	Stadium: Stade Dominique Duvauchelle; Attendance: 0 Referee: Romain Zamo

14 February 2021	Saint-Brice FC (6)	2–0	JA Drancy (5)	Saint-Brice-sous-Forêt
13:30 CET	Mafouta 69'; Ongmakon 85'	Report		Stadium: Stade Léon Graffin; Attendance: 0

14 February 2021	Racing Besançon (5)	0–1	UF Mâconnais (6)	Besançon
13:30 CET		Report	Gbaguidi 6'	Stadium: Stade Léo Lagrange; Attendance: 0 Referee: Florian Mathieu

14 February 2021	Louhans-Cuiseaux FC (4)	0–1	FC Fleury 91 (4)	Louhans
13:30 CET		Report	Touré 30'	Stadium: Stade du Bram; Attendance: 0 Referee: Yohan Gagnant

==== Combined Pays de la Loire and Normandy group ====
17 February 2021	Sablé FC (5)	1–4	Olympique Saumur FC (5)	Sablé-sur-Sarthe
13:30 CET	Monnier 65'	Report	Bouhoutt 34'; Blanchard 43'; Billeaux 61'; Matingou 90'	Stadium: Stade Rémy Lambert; Attendance: 0 Referee: Kevin Barbin

16 February 2021	Les Herbiers VF (4)	3–0	Stade Lavallois (3)	Les Herbiers
13:30 CET	Grellier 10'; Assoumin 61'; Schuster 90+4'	Report		Stadium: Parc des Sports Massabielle; Attendance: 0 Referee: Pierre Retail

13 February 2021	US Quevilly-Rouen (3)	1–0	FC Rouen (4)	Le Petit-Quevilly
19:00 CET	Jung 57'	Report		Stadium: Stade Robert Diochon; Attendance: 0 Referee: Romain Lissorgue

14 February 2021	ESM Gonfreville (6)	0–2	Voltigeurs de Châteaubriant (4)	Gonfreville-l'Orcher
13:30 CET		Report	Soumano 61'; Vernet 67'	Stadium: Stade Maurice Baquet; Attendance: 0 Referee: Cyril Dell Angela

== Round of 64 ==
The round of 64 was separated into two paths. The professional path took place between the twenty teams from Ligue 1 and the ten winners of the eighth round professional path. The amateur path took place between the 31 mainland qualifiers from the eighth round and the 3 overseas qualifiers. The tie between US Sinnamary and the team from Martinique was pre-drawn 18 December 2020.

- The draw for the professional path took place on 7 January 2021. Matches took place between 9 and 11 February.
- The draw for the amateur path took place on 12 February. Matches took place on 20, 21 and 25 February.

=== Professional path ===
==== Group A ====
10 February 2021	Amiens (2)	1–2	Metz (1)	Amiens
17:00 CET	Blin 53'	Report	Leya Iseka 1'; Vagner 90+4' (pen.)	Stadium: Stade de la Licorne; Attendance: 0 Referee: Olivier Thual

9 February 2021	Reims (1)	3–4	Valenciennes (2)	Reims
18:30 CET	Sierhuis 30'; Dia 84', 90'	Report	Guillaume 22', 56'; Cabral 63', 81'	Stadium: Stade Auguste Delaune; Attendance: 0 Referee: Jérémie Pignard

10 February 2021	Dijon (1)	0–1	Lille (1)	Dijon
19:00 CET		Report	Camara 15'	Stadium: Stade Gaston Gérard; Attendance: 0 Referee: Willy Delajod

==== Group B ====
10 February 2021	Bordeaux (1)	0–2	Toulouse (2)	Bordeaux
14:45 CET		Report	Bayo 39'; Antiste 57'	Stadium: Matmut Atlantique; Attendance: 0 Referee: Hakim Ben El Hadj

10 February 2021	Brest (1)	2–1	Rodez (2)	Brest
17:00 CET	Mounié 34'; Le Douaron 36'	Report	Dembélé 16'	Stadium: Stade Francis-Le Blé; Attendance: 0 Referee: Aurélien Petit

11 February 2021	Angers (1)	2–1	Rennes (1)	Angers
21:00 CET	Fulgini 4', 14' (pen.)	Report	Guirassy 53'	Stadium: Stade Raymond Kopa; Attendance: 0 Referee: Benoît Bastien

==== Group C ====
10 February 2021	Grenoble (2)	0–1	Monaco (1)	Grenoble
14:45 CET		Report	Jovetić 36'	Stadium: Stade des Alpes; Attendance: 0 Referee: Bastien Dechepy

9 February 2021	Lyon (1)	5–1	Ajaccio (2)	Décines-Charpieu
21:00 CET	Depay 10'; Slimani 22'; Cornet 24'; Cherki 38'; Aouar 79' (pen.)	Report	Nouri 90' (pen.)	Stadium: Parc Olympique Lyonnais; Attendance: 0 Referee: Florent Batta

10 February 2021	Nîmes (1)	1–3	Nice (1)	Nîmes
17:00 CET	Duljević 36'	Report	Lopes 13', 29'; Lees-Melou 82'	Stadium: Stade des Costières; Attendance: 0 Referee: Amaury Delerue

==== Group D ====
10 February 2021	Strasbourg (1)	0–2	Montpellier (1)	Strasbourg
14:45 CET		Report	Delort 45+1'; Škuletić 88'	Stadium: Stade de la Meinau; Attendance: 0 Referee: Ruddy Buquet

11 February 2021	Sochaux (2)	1–0	Saint-Étienne (1)	Montbéliard
18:45 CET	Bedia 5'	Report		Stadium: Stade Auguste Bonal; Attendance: 0 Referee: Jérémy Stinat

10 February 2021	Auxerre (2)	0–2	Marseille (1)	Auxerre
14:45 CET		Report	Benedetto 54'; Dieng 90+2'	Stadium: Stade de l'Abbé-Deschamps; Attendance: 0 Referee: Frank Schneider

==== Group E ====
9 February 2021	Lorient (1)	2–1	Paris FC (2)	Lorient
18:30 CET	Wissa 72' (pen.); Moffi 83'	Report	Name 13'	Stadium: Stade du Moustoir; Attendance: 0 Referee: Eric Wattellier

10 February 2021	Caen (2)	0–1	Paris Saint-Germain (1)	Caen
21:00 CET		Report	Kean 49'	Stadium: Stade Michel d'Ornano; Attendance: 0 Referee: Jérôme Miguelgorry

10 February 2021	Nantes (1)	2–4	Lens (1)	Nantes
14:45 CET	Bamba 24', 63'	Report	Jean 27', 39'; Doucouré 36'; Kalimuendo 58'	Stadium: Stade de la Beaujoire; Attendance: 0 Referee: Johan Hamel

=== Amateur path ===
==== Overseas tie ====
30 January 2021	US Sinnamary (French Guiana)	1–1 (1–3 p)	(Martinique) Club Franciscain	Rémire-Montjoly, French Guiana
15:30 (UTC-03:00)	Aninie 15' (pen.)	Report	Abaul 36'	Stadium: Stade Municipal Dr. Edmard Lama; Attendance: 500; Referee: Olivier Thual

==== Overseas and mainland tie ====
FC Mtsapéré were scheduled to face a team from the mainland at INF Clairefontaine, opponent to be decided in the main draw on 12 February 2021. However, having arrived at Roland Garros Airport on Réunion on 11 February, they were denied transit to France due to COVID-19 contact concerns, and informed they must return to Mayotte. A report on 12 February suggested it might have been possible for the team to isolate in Réunion and travel to France at a later date, but this did not happen.

On 17 February 2021, it was announced that FC Mtsapére would be allowed to depart for mainland France on 21 February, and would play their game on 25 February in Romorantin-Lanthenay.

25 February 2021	SO Romorantin (4)	2–0	(Mayotte) FC Mtsapéré	Romorantin-Lanthenay
14:00 CET	Abelinti 13'; Payet 18'	Report		Stadium: Stade Jules Ladoumègue; Referee: Ludovic Genest

==== Mainland ties ====
===== Group A =====
21 February 2021	Olympique Alès (5)	2–0	AS Fabrègues (5)	Alès
14:00 CET	Sbai 4'; El Bakkal 47'	Report		Stadium: Stade Pierre Pibarot; Attendance: 0 Referee: Maxime Apruzzese

21 February 2021	Le Puy Foot 43 Auvergne (4)	0–0 (5–4 p)	FC Chamalières (4)	Le Puy-en-Velay
14:00 CET		Report		Stadium: Stade Charles Massot; Attendance: 0 Referee: William Toulliou

21 February 2021	Aubagne FC (4)	2–2 (4–2 p)	US Lège Cap Ferret (5)	Aubagne
13:30 CET	Gomis 39'; Fourrier 75'	Report	Samb 53'; Agueni 62' (o.g.)	Stadium: Stade de Lattre-de-Tassigny; Attendance: 0 Referee: Julien Rouquette

21 February 2021	Canet Roussillon FC (4)	1–1 (4–2 p)	Stade Poitevin FC (5)	Canet-en-Roussillon
13:30 CET	Koné 85'	Report	César Neto 55'	Stadium: Stade Saint-Michel; Attendance: 0 Referee: Floris Aubin

===== Group B =====
21 February 2021	SC Schiltigheim (4)	0–4	CS Sedan Ardennes (4)	Schiltigheim
14:00 CET		Report	Dahchour 8'; Ramalingom 37'; Bijimine 45'; Quarshie 51'	Stadium: Stade de l'Aar; Attendance: 0 Referee: Mickael Leleu

20 February 2021	FC Fleury 91 (4)	1–1 (4–5 p)	Annecy FC (3)	Fleury-Mérogis
13:30 CET	Adéoti 90+5' (o.g.)	Report	El Jaouhari 88'	Stadium: Stade Auguste Gentelet; Attendance: 0 Referee: Emmanuel Caron

21 February 2021	UF Mâconnais (6)	0–0 (2–4 p)	FC Saint-Louis Neuweg (5)	Mâcon
15:00 CET		Report		Stadium: Stade Pierre Guérin; Attendance: 0 Referee: Robin Chapapria

21 February 2021	GFA Rumilly-Vallières (4)	0–0 (4–2 p)	AS Prix-lès-Mézières (5)	Rumilly
13:30 CET		Report		Stadium: Stade des Grangettes; Attendance: 0 Referee: Aldric Chancioux

===== Group C =====
20 February 2021	US Montagnarde (6)	1–1 (3–2 p)	Stade Briochin (3)	Inzinzac-Lochrist
13:30 CET	Barry 31'	Report	Illien 42'	Stadium: Stade Mané Braz; Attendance: 0 Referee: Pierre Legat

21 February 2021	FC Guichen (6)	0–1	Olympique Saumur FC (5)	Guichen
13:30 CET		Report	Bouhoutt 69'	Stadium: Stade Charles Gautier; Attendance: 0 Referee: Romain Zamo

21 February 2021	Les Herbiers VF (4)	0–1	Voltigeurs de Châteaubriant (4)	Les Herbiers
13:30 CET		Report	Soumano 51'	Stadium: Parc des Sports Massabielle; Attendance: 0 Referee: Leo Beulet

===== Group D =====
21 February 2021	OS Aire-sur-la-Lys (7)	1–4	AS Beauvais Oise (4)	Aire-sur-la-Lys
13:30 CET	Guilbert 43'	Report	Duhamel 23', 50', 77'; Haddou 27' (pen.)	Stadium: Parc des Sports Paul Nestier; Attendance: 0 Referee: Marc Michout

21 February 2021	Saint-Brice FC (6)	0–1	Gazélec Ajaccio (4)	Saint-Brice-sous-Forêt
14:00 CET		Report	Penneteau 18'	Stadium: Stade Léon Graffin; Attendance: 0 Referee: Yann Flament

20 February 2021	Red Star FC (3)	2–1	US Quevilly-Rouen (3)	Saint-Ouen-sur-Seine
13:30 CET	De Almeide 39'; Akassou 83'	Report	Sissoko 5'	Stadium: Stade Bauer; Attendance: 0 Referee: Eddy Rosier

20 February 2021	FC Loon-Plage (6)	0–3	US Boulogne (3)	Loon-Plage
13:30 CET		Report	Pierret 11'; Idazza 48'; Odzoumo 87'	Stadium: Stade Marcel Rosseel; Attendance: 0 Referee: Geoffrey Kubler

== Round of 32 ==
The draw for the Round of 32 was held on 21 February 2021. It consisted of matches split into four groups, balanced primarily by geography but also to ensure an even spread of teams from different levels. Matches took place between 5 and 8 March.

=== Group A ===
6 March 2021	Red Star (3)	3–2	Lens (1)	Saint-Ouen-sur-Seine
14:15 CET	Ba 21'; Michel 83'; Dzabana 90'	Report	Medina 29'; Doucouré 49'	Stadium: Stade Bauer; Attendance: 0 Referee: Karim Abed

5 March 2021	AS Beauvais Oise (4)	0–2	US Boulogne (3)	Beauvais
21:00 CET		Report	Abdeldjelil 45+1'; Senneville 78' (pen.)	Stadium: Stade Pierre Brisson; Attendance: 0 Referee: Thomas Léonard

7 March 2021	Gazélec Ajaccio (4)	1–3	Lille (1)	Ajaccio
18:30 CET	Pollet 87'	Report	Durimel 9' (o.g.); Xeka 72'; Lopy 84' (o.g.)	Stadium: Stade Ange Casanova; Attendance: 0 Referee: Benoît Millot

6 March 2021	Valenciennes (2)	0–4	Metz (1)	Valenciennes
16:30 CET		Report	Centonze 7' (pen.); Ambrose 34' (pen.); Vagner 61'; Sarr 89'	Stadium: Stade du Hainaut; Attendance: 0 Referee: Stéphanie Frappart

=== Group B ===
8 March 2021	Nice (1)	0–2	Monaco (1)	Nice
21:00 CET		Report	Volland 29'; Aguilar 87'	Stadium: Allianz Riviera; Attendance: 0 Referee: Benoît Bastien

6 March 2021	GFA Rumilly-Vallières (4)	1–1 (6–5 p)	Annecy FC (3)	Rumilly
14:15 CET	Liongo 29'	Report	Fillon 53'	Stadium: Stade des Grangettes; Attendance: 0 Referee: Bastien Depechy
	Penalties
	Guillaud (penalty scored); Diaby (penalty scored); Lévêque (penalty scored); Gay (penalty missed); Volic (penalty missed); Njedi (penalty scored); Peuget (penalty scored); Boinali (penalty scored)		(penalty scored) Marie; (penalty missed) Spano; (penalty missed) Poulain; (penalty scored) Alfarela; (penalty scored) Adéoti; (penalty scored) Kashi; (penalty scored) Fillon; (penalty missed) Sene

6 March 2021	FC Saint-Louis Neuweg (5)	0–2	CS Sedan Ardennes (4)	Saint-Louis
14:15 CET		Report	Ramalingom 73'; Dahchour 83'	Stadium: Stade de la Frontière; Attendance: 0 Referee: Florent Batta

6 March 2021	Lyon (1)	5–2	Sochaux (2)	Décines-Charpieu
18:45 CET	Benlamri 8'; Cornet 10'; Cherki 45', 87'; Denayer 77'	Report	Bedia 41', 56'	Stadium: Parc Olympique Lyonnais; Attendance: 0 Referee: Eric Wattellier

=== Group C ===
7 March 2021	Canet Roussillon FC (4)	2–1	Marseille (1)	Perpignan
21:00 CET	Posteraro 21'; Bai 71'	Report	Milik 38'	Stadium: Stade Gilbert Brutus; Attendance: 0 Referee: Willy Delajod

6 March 2021	Olympique Alès (5)	1–2	Montpellier (1)	Alès
14:15 CET	El Bakkal 22'	Report	Ferri 11'; Laborde 84'	Stadium: Stade Pierre Pibarot; Attendance: 0 Referee: Jérémie Pignard

7 March 2021	Angers (1)	5–0	(Martinique) Club Franciscain	Angers
18:30 CET	Fulgini 31'; Amadou 45+1', 60'; Bahoken 52'; Fatar 87'	Report		Stadium: Stade Raymond Kopa; Attendance: 0 Referee: Jérôme Miguelgorry

5 March 2021	Aubagne FC (4)	0–2	Toulouse (2)	Martigues
21:00 CET		Report	Koné 9'; Ngoumou 53'	Stadium: Stade Francis Turcan; Attendance: 0 Referee: Aurélien Petit

=== Group D ===
6 March 2021	Brest (1)	0–3	Paris Saint-Germain (1)	Brest
21:10 CET		Report	Mbappé 9', 73'; Sarabia 44'	Stadium: Stade Francis-Le Blé; Attendance: 0 Referee: Jérôme Brisard

6 March 2021	Le Puy Foot 43 Auvergne (4)	1–0	Lorient (1)	Le Puy-en-Velay
16:30 CET	Joseph 61'	Report		Stadium: Stade Charles Massot; Attendance: 0 Referee: Franck Schneider

6 March 2021	Olympique Saumur FC (5)	3–3 (4–3 p)	US Montagnarde (6)	Saumur
16:30 CET	Bouhoutt 9' (pen.), 47' (pen.); Bokangu 65'	Report	Barry 40', 75'; Rio 90+1'	Stadium: Stade des Rives du Thouet; Attendance: 0 Referee: Amaury Delerue
	Penalties
	Billeaux (penalty missed); Itoua-Ngoua (penalty missed); Touzet (penalty scored); Viaud (penalty scored); Bouhoutt (penalty scored); Bacha (penalty scored)		(penalty scored) Barry; (penalty scored) Zambe; (penalty missed) Foll; (penalty scored) Mouyoumbi; (penalty missed) Petitgenet; (penalty missed) Obame

7 March 2021	SO Romorantin (4)	1–3	Voltigeurs de Châteaubriant (4)	Romorantin-Lanthenay
18:30 CET	Benaries 55'	Report	Vernet 10', 30'; Poissonneau 90+5'	Stadium: Stade Jules Ladoumègue; Attendance: 0 Referee: Mikael Lesage

== Round of 16 ==
The draw for the Round of 16 was held on 8 March 2021. Matches took place on 17 March, and between 6 and 8 April.

17 March 2021	Paris Saint-Germain (1)	3–0	Lille (1)	Paris
17:45 CET	Icardi 9'; Mbappé 41' (pen.), 90+3'	Report		Stadium: Parc des Princes; Attendance: 0 Referee: Willy Delajod

7 April 2021	Olympique Saumur FC (5)	1–2	Toulouse (2)	Saumur
18:45 CEST	Bouhoutt 32'	Report	Spierings 20' (pen.); Kasongo 67'	Stadium: Stade des Rives du Thouet; Attendance: 0 Referee: Johan Hamel

6 April 2021	Monaco (1)	0–0 (5–4 p)	Metz (1)	Monaco
18:45 CEST		Report		Stadium: Stade Louis II; Attendance: 0 Referee: Jérémie Pignard
	Penalties
	Ben Yedder (penalty scored); Volland (penalty scored); Sidibé (penalty scored); Fàbregas (penalty scored); Jovetić (penalty scored)		(penalty scored) Sarr; (penalty scored) Yade; (penalty scored) Ambrose; (penalty missed) Maïga; (penalty scored) Bronn

7 April 2021	GFA Rumilly-Vallières (4)	4–0	Le Puy Foot 43 Auvergne (4)	Rumilly
16:45 CEST	Bozon 12'; Peuget 83' (pen.); Gay 85'; Liongo 90+3'	Report		Stadium: Stade des Grangettes; Attendance: 0 Referee: Florent Batta

8 April 2021	Red Star (3)	2–2 (4–5 p)	Lyon (1)	Saint-Ouen-sur-Seine
19:00 CEST	Ba 61'; Roye 74'	Report	Paquetá 28'; Depay 45'	Stadium: Stade Bauer; Attendance: 0 Referee: Jérôme Miguelgorry
	Penalties
	Ba (penalty scored); Durand (penalty scored); Dzabana (penalty scored); Michel (penalty missed); N'Doye (penalty scored)		(penalty scored) Bruno Guimarães; (penalty scored) Paquetá; (penalty scored) Marcelo; (penalty scored) Denayer; (penalty scored) Toko Ekambi

7 April 2021	Canet Roussillon FC (4)	1–0	US Boulogne (3)	Perpignan
18:45 CEST	Bai 42'	Report		Stadium: Stade Gilbert Brutus; Attendance: 0 Referee: Hakim Ben El Hadj

7 April 2021	Voltigeurs de Châteaubriant (4)	0–1	Montpellier (1)	Châteaubriant
18:45 CEST		Report	Mollet 61'	Stadium: Stade de la Ville en Bois; Attendance: 0 Referee: Ruddy Buquet

7 April 2021	CS Sedan Ardennes (4)	0–1	Angers (1)	Sedan
16:45 CEST		Report	Manceau 25'	Stadium: Stade Louis Dugauguez; Attendance: 0 Referee: Eric Wattellier

== Quarter-finals ==
The draw for the quarter-finals was held on 9 April 2021. Matches took place on 20 and 21 April.

21 April 2021	Lyon (1)	0–2	Monaco (1)	Décines-Charpieu
21:10 CEST		Report	Ben Yedder 54' (pen.); Volland 61'	Stadium: Parc Olympique Lyonnais; Attendance: 0 Referee: Stéphanie Frappart

21 April 2021	Paris Saint-Germain (1)	5–0	Angers (1)	Paris
18:45 CEST	Icardi 9', 68', 90'; Manceau 23' (o.g.); Neymar 65'	Report		Stadium: Parc des Princes; Attendance: 0 Referee: Amaury Delerue

20 April 2021	Canet Roussillon FC (4)	1–2	Montpellier (1)	Perpignan
21:00 CEST	Ouadoudi 25' (pen.)	Report	Delort 60', 84' (pen.)	Stadium: Stade Gilbert Brutus; Attendance: 0 Referee: Mikael Lesage

20 April 2021	GFA Rumilly-Vallières (4)	2–0	Toulouse (2)	Annecy
18:45 CEST	Guillaud 19'; Rouault 83' (o.g.)	Report		Stadium: Parc des Sports; Attendance: 0 Referee: Jérôme Brisard

== Semi-finals ==
The draw for the semi-finals was held on 25 April 2021. Matches took place on 12 and 13 May.

12 May 2021	Montpellier (1)	2–2 (5–6 p)	Paris Saint-Germain (1)	Montpellier
21:00 CEST	Laborde 45'; Delort 83'	Report	Mbappé 10', 50'	Stadium: Stade de la Mosson; Attendance: 0 Referee: Jérémie Pignard
	Penalties
	Savanier (penalty scored); Delort (penalty scored); Mavididi (penalty scored); Ristić (penalty scored); Laborde (penalty scored); Sambia (penalty missed)		(penalty scored) Di María; (penalty scored) Draxler; (penalty scored) Paredes; (penalty scored) Marquinhos; (penalty scored) Neymar; (penalty scored) Kean

13 May 2021	GFA Rumilly-Vallières (4)	1–5	Monaco (1)	Annecy
21:15 CEST	Peuget 20'	Report	Bozon 27' (o.g.); Tchouaméni 32'; Ben Yedder 55'; Fàbregas 78'; Golovin 82'	Stadium: Parc des Sports; Attendance: 0 Referee: Ruddy Buquet

== Final ==
19 May 2021
21:15 CEST

Monaco	0–2	Paris Saint-Germain
		Icardi 19'; Mbappé 81'

Stade de France, Saint-Denis
Attendance: 0 (Note: The final was played behind closed doors due to the COVID-19 pandemic in France.)
Referee: François Letexier
