= List of Ligue 1 seasons =

List of Ligue 1 seasons details the various seasons and standings in Ligue 1, the top level of French association football.

== 2000-01 Division 1 ==
=== League table ===
Pos	Team	Pld	W	D	L	GF	GA	GD	Pts	Qualification or relegation
1	Nantes (C)	34	21	5	8	58	36	+22	68	Qualification to Champions League first group stage
2	Lyon	34	17	13	4	57	30	+27	64	Qualification to Champions League first group stage
3	Lille	34	16	11	7	43	27	+16	59	Qualification to Champions League third qualifying round
4	Bordeaux	34	15	12	7	48	33	+15	57	Qualification to UEFA Cup first round
5	Sedan	34	14	10	10	47	40	+7	52	Qualification to UEFA Cup first round
6	Rennes	34	15	5	14	46	37	+9	50	Qualification to Intertoto Cup third round
7	Troyes	34	11	13	10	45	47	−2	46	Qualification to Intertoto Cup second round
8	Bastia	34	13	6	15	45	41	+4	45	Qualification to Intertoto Cup second round
9	Paris Saint-Germain	34	12	8	14	44	45	−1	44	Qualification to Intertoto Cup second round
10	Guingamp	34	11	11	12	40	48	−8	44	
11	Monaco	34	12	7	15	53	50	+3	43	
12	Metz	34	11	9	14	35	44	−9	42	
13	Auxerre	34	11	8	15	31	41	−10	41	
14	Lens	34	9	13	12	37	39	−2	40	
15	Marseille	34	11	7	16	31	40	−9	40	
16	Toulouse (R)	34	9	10	15	34	49	−15	37	Administratively relegated to Championnat National (Note: Toulouse was administratively relegated to Championnat National by the DNCG due to financial difficulties.)
17	Saint-Étienne (R)	34	8	10	16	42	56	−14	34	Relegation to French Division 2
18	Strasbourg (R)	34	7	8	19	28	61	−33	29	UEFA Cup first round and relegation to French Division 2 (Note: Strasbourg was qualified for the 2001–02 UEFA Cup as winners of the 2000–01 Coupe de France.)

Source: Ligue 1
Rules for classification: 1) points; 2) goal difference; 3) number of goals scored.
(C) Champions; (R) Relegated
Notes:

Promoted from Ligue 2, who will play in the 2001–02 Division 1

- Sochaux: champions of Ligue 2
- Lorient: runners-up
- Montpellier: third place

=== Position by round ===
Team ╲ Round	1	2	3	4	5	6	7	8	9	10	11	12	13	14	15	16	17	18	19	20	21	22	23	24	25	26	27	28	29	30	31	32	33	34
Nantes	18	7	4	3	4	7	7	10	13	15	11	7	10	6	9	6	5	2	2	4	2	1	1	2	2	2	2	2	2	1	1	1	1	1
Lyon	8	10	11	14	12	13	9	5	9	8	5	6	8	4	5	8	7	7	7	5	7	5	5	4	3	5	5	4	3	3	2	2	2	2
Lille	13	3	1	5	2	3	8	7	4	4	7	3	2	5	6	3	2	3	5	3	4	2	2	1	1	1	1	1	1	2	3	4	4	3
Bordeaux	12	16	16	16	16	14	15	16	12	12	6	9	6	3	2	1	1	1	3	1	3	4	3	3	4	3	3	5	4	4	4	3	3	4
Sedan	4	6	8	7	10	6	4	6	7	7	4	5	3	1	1	2	3	4	1	2	1	3	4	6	5	4	4	3	5	5	5	5	5	5
Rennais	9	11	12	10	11	15	16	15	16	14	10	12	13	12	12	13	15	13	10	11	10	7	9	9	10	10	7	10	6	6	6	6	6	6
Troyes	16	15	15	12	14	10	5	8	6	6	8	10	7	10	7	9	10	11	9	10	9	10	8	8	7	8	6	6	7	7	7	7	7	7
Bastia	5	2	5	2	5	2	1	1	2	1	2	2	4	8	4	7	6	5	4	6	5	8	6	5	6	6	8	9	10	11	11	9	10	8
PSG	2	5	2	6	3	4	3	3	1	2	1	1	1	2	3	4	8	9	12	9	11	11	12	10	11	11	12	11	12	10	12	12	11	9
Guingamp	7	12	17	17	18	16	14	12	10	9	12	8	5	7	8	5	4	6	8	8	6	6	7	7	8	7	9	7	8	8	8	10	9	10
Monaco	10	17	9	8	8	12	13	9	5	5	3	4	9	11	13	10	11	12	11	12	13	15	14	14	12	12	11	12	11	12	9	8	8	11
Metz	11	13	13	11	13	11	6	4	8	11	13	13	11	14	15	15	14	16	16	16	16	16	16	16	16	15	16	14	15	15	14	13	14	12
Auxerre	14	8	6	9	6	9	11	14	15	13	15	15	14	13	14	14	12	10	13	13	14	12	13	12	9	9	10	8	9	9	10	11	12	13
Lens	3	1	3	1	1	1	2	2	3	3	9	11	12	9	10	11	9	8	6	7	8	9	10	11	13	13	13	13	13	13	13	14	13	14
Marseille	1	9	10	13	9	5	10	13	11	10	14	14	15	16	16	16	16	15	15	15	15	14	15	15	15	16	14	15	16	16	15	15	15	15
Etienne	6	4	7	4	7	8	12	11	14	16	16	16	16	15	11	12	13	14	14	14	12	13	11	13	14	14	15	16	14	14	16	16	16	16
Toulouse	15	14	14	15	15	17	17	17	18	18	18	18	18	18	18	18	18	18	18	17	17	17	17	17	17	17	17	17	17	18	17	17	17	17
Strasbourg	17	18	18	18	17	18	18	18	17	17	17	17	17	17	17	17	17	17	17	18	18	18	18	18	18	18	18	18	18	17	18	18	18	18

Champions of 2000-01 Division 1
Qualified for UEFA Champions League
Qualified for UEFA Cup
Relegation to Ligue 2

First match(es) will be played on ?. Source:

== 2001-02 Division 1 ==
=== League table ===
Pos	Team	Pld	W	D	L	GF	GA	GD	Pts	Qualification or relegation
1	Lyon (C)	34	20	6	8	62	32	+30	66	Qualification to Champions League first group stage
2	Lens	34	18	10	6	55	30	+25	64	Qualification to Champions League first group stage
3	Auxerre	34	16	11	7	48	38	+10	59	Qualification to Champions League third qualifying round
4	Paris Saint-Germain	34	15	13	6	43	24	+19	58	Qualification to UEFA Cup first round
5	Lille	34	15	11	8	39	32	+7	56	Qualification to Intertoto Cup third round
6	Bordeaux	34	14	8	12	34	31	+3	50	Qualification to UEFA Cup first round (Note: Bordeaux was qualified for the 2002–03 UEFA Cup as winners of the 2001–02 Coupe de la Ligue.)
7	Troyes	34	13	8	13	40	35	+5	47	Qualification to Intertoto Cup second round
8	Sochaux	34	12	10	12	41	40	+1	46	Qualification to Intertoto Cup second round
9	Marseille	34	11	11	12	34	39	−5	44	
10	Nantes	34	12	7	15	35	41	−6	43	
11	Bastia	34	12	5	17	38	44	−6	41	
12	Rennes	34	11	8	15	40	51	−11	41	
13	Montpellier	34	9	13	12	28	31	−3	40	
14	Sedan	34	8	15	11	35	39	−4	39	
15	Monaco	34	9	12	13	36	41	−5	39	
16	Guingamp	34	9	8	17	34	57	−23	35	
17	Metz (R)	34	9	6	19	31	47	−16	33	Relegation to Ligue 2
18	Lorient (R)	34	7	10	17	43	64	−21	31	UEFA Cup first round and relegated to Ligue 2 (Note: Lorient was qualified for the 2002–03 UEFA Cup as winners of the 2001–02 Coupe de France.)

Source: Ligue 1
Rules for classification: 1) points; 2) goal difference; 3) number of goals scored.
(C) Champions; (R) Relegated
Notes:

Promoted from Ligue 2, who will play in Ligue 1 season 2002/2003

- AC Ajaccio : champion of Ligue 2
- RC Strasbourg : runners-up
- OGC Nice : third place
- Le Havre AC : fourth place

=== Position by round ===
Team ╲ Round	1	2	3	4	5	6	7	8	9	10	11	12	13	14	15	16	17	18	19	20	21	22	23	24	25	26	27	28	29	30	31	32	33	34
Lyon	16	8	4	3	2	3	3	4	1	3	3	4	3	2	2	2	2	2	2	2	2	2	2	2	2	2	2	2	2	2	2	2	2	1
Lens	4	1	1	1	1	2	1	3	4	2	1	1	1	1	1	1	1	1	1	1	1	1	1	1	1	1	1	1	1	1	1	1	1	2
Auxerre	1	3	2	2	3	1	2	1	2	4	4	3	4	3	4	4	3	3	3	3	3	3	3	3	3	3	3	3	3	3	4	3	3	3
PSG	12	13	8	7	4	6	5	6	8	8	8	7	8	8	8	7	5	5	5	6	5	4	4	4	4	4	4	4	4	4	3	4	4	4
Lille	11	4	6	4	5	4	4	2	3	1	2	2	2	4	3	3	4	4	4	4	6	6	5	5	5	5	5	5	5	5	5	5	5	5
Bordeaux	3	5	7	10	12	14	12	7	6	6	7	5	5	7	5	5	6	6	6	5	4	5	6	6	6	6	6	6	6	6	6	6	6	6
Troyes	2	6	9	5	7	9	13	9	10	7	6	8	7	6	6	6	8	7	7	7	7	7	7	7	7	7	7	7	7	7	7	7	7	7
Sochaux	6	2	3	6	6	5	6	5	5	5	5	6	6	5	7	8	7	8	8	8	9	9	9	9	9	12	9	8	8	8	8	8	8	8
Marseille	9	12	15	16	16	16	17	16	17	14	14	15	13	14	9	10	10	10	10	12	12	12	12	13	12	8	10	9	10	10	12	10	9	9
Nantes	15	17	17	18	18	18	18	18	18	18	18	18	18	18	18	18	18	18	18	17	14	14	13	12	13	14	14	14	13	12	11	9	11	10
Bastia	10	14	16	11	9	7	7	8	7	9	11	13	9	11	14	15	13	11	11	13	13	13	14	14	14	13	13	13	14	13	14	13	14	11
Rennais	18	18	12	8	13	10	9	14	16	13	10	11	14	9	10	11	12	12	14	14	15	18	16	16	15	15	15	15	15	15	15	15	15	12
Montpellier	8	11	5	9	11	12	10	13	14	16	16	14	16	13	13	9	9	9	9	9	8	8	8	8	8	10	11	12	12	14	13	14	10	13
Sedan	7	16	14	15	14	13	11	17	15	17	17	17	17	17	17	16	16	14	12	11	11	10	11	10	10	9	12	10	9	9	9	11	13	14
Monaco	13	15	18	17	17	15	15	10	13	10	12	10	11	10	12	12	14	15	13	10	10	11	10	11	11	11	8	11	11	11	10	12	12	15
Guingamp	17	10	10	13	10	11	14	15	11	12	9	12	12	12	11	14	11	13	15	15	16	16	15	15	17	16	17	16	16	16	18	17	17	16
Metz	14	7	13	14	15	17	16	12	12	15	15	16	15	16	15	13	15	16	16	16	17	15	17	17	16	17	18	18	18	17	16	16	16	17
Loreint	5	9	11	12	8	8	8	11	9	11	13	9	10	15	16	17	17	17	17	18	18	17	18	18	18	18	16	17	17	18	17	18	18	18

Champions of 2001-02 Division 1
Qualified for UEFA Champions League
Qualified for UEFA Cup
Relegation to Ligue 2

First match(es) will be played on ?. Source:

== 2008-09 Ligue 1 ==
=== League table ===
Pos	Team	Pld	W	D	L	GF	GA	GD	Pts	Qualification or relegation
1	Bordeaux (C)	38	24	8	6	64	34	+30	80	Qualification to Champions League group stage
2	Marseille	38	22	11	5	67	35	+32	77	Qualification to Champions League group stage
3	Lyon	38	20	11	7	52	29	+23	71	Qualification to Champions League play-off round
4	Toulouse	38	16	16	6	45	27	+18	64	Qualification to Europa League play-off round
5	Lille	38	17	13	8	51	39	+12	64	Qualification to Europa League third qualifying round
6	Paris Saint-Germain	38	19	7	12	49	38	+11	64	
7	Rennes	38	15	16	7	42	34	+8	61	
8	Auxerre	38	16	7	15	35	35	0	55	
9	Nice	38	13	11	14	40	41	−1	50	
10	Lorient	38	10	15	13	47	47	0	45	
11	Monaco	38	11	12	15	41	45	−4	45	
12	Valenciennes	38	10	14	14	35	42	−7	44	
13	Grenoble	38	10	14	14	24	37	−13	44	
14	Sochaux	38	10	12	16	40	48	−8	42	
15	Nancy	38	10	12	16	38	47	−9	42	
16	Le Mans	38	10	10	18	43	54	−11	40	
17	Saint-Étienne	38	11	7	20	40	56	−16	40	
18	Caen (R)	38	8	13	17	42	49	−7	37	Relegation to Ligue 2
19	Nantes (R)	38	9	10	19	33	54	−21	37	Relegation to Ligue 2
20	Le Havre (R)	38	7	5	26	30	67	−37	26	Relegation to Ligue 2

Source: Ligue 1
Rules for classification: 1) points; 2) goal difference; 3) number of goals scored.
France's third UEFA Europa League spot went to Ligue 2 side Guingamp, winners of 2008–09 Coupe de France.
(C) Champions; (R) Relegated

== 2009-10 Ligue 1 ==
=== League table ===
Pos	Team	Pld	W	D	L	GF	GA	GD	Pts	Qualification or relegation
1	Marseille (C)	38	23	9	6	69	36	+33	78	Qualification to Champions League group stage
2	Lyon	38	20	12	6	64	38	+26	72	Qualification to Champions League group stage
3	Auxerre	38	20	11	7	42	29	+13	71	Qualification to Champions League play-off round
4	Lille	38	21	7	10	72	40	+32	70	Qualification to Europa League play-off round (Note: Coupe de France winners Paris Saint-Germain qualify for the 2010–11 UEFA Europa League Play-off round of 2010–11 UEFA Europa League.)
5	Montpellier	38	20	9	9	50	40	+10	69	Qualification to Europa League third qualifying round (Note: Coupe de la Ligue winners Marseille finished as champions, fulfilling a finish of at least 4th place, thus their Europa League Third qualifying round berth will go to the 5th placed team in the league.)
6	Bordeaux	38	19	7	12	58	40	+18	64	
7	Lorient	38	16	10	12	54	42	+12	58	
8	Monaco	38	15	10	13	39	45	−6	55	
9	Rennes	38	14	11	13	52	41	+11	53	
10	Valenciennes	38	14	10	14	50	50	0	52	
11	Lens	38	12	12	14	40	44	−4	48	
12	Nancy	38	13	9	16	46	53	−7	48	
13	Paris Saint-Germain	38	12	11	15	50	46	+4	47	Qualification to Europa League play-off round
14	Toulouse	38	12	11	15	36	36	0	47	
15	Nice	38	11	11	16	41	57	−16	44	
16	Sochaux	38	11	8	19	28	52	−24	41	
17	Saint-Étienne	38	10	10	18	27	45	−18	40	
18	Le Mans (R)	38	8	8	22	36	59	−23	32	Relegation to Ligue 2
19	Boulogne (R)	38	7	10	21	31	62	−31	31	Relegation to Ligue 2
20	Grenoble (R)	38	5	8	25	31	61	−30	23	Relegation to Ligue 2

Source: Ligue 1
Rules for classification: 1) points; 2) goal difference; 3) number of goals scored.
(C) Champions; (R) Relegated

== 2010-11 Ligue 1 ==
=== League table ===
Pos	Team	Pld	W	D	L	GF	GA	GD	Pts	Qualification or relegation
1	Lille (C)	38	21	13	4	68	36	+32	76	Qualification to Champions League group stage
2	Marseille	38	18	14	6	62	39	+23	68	Qualification to Champions League group stage
3	Lyon	38	17	13	8	61	40	+21	64	Qualification to Champions League play-off round
4	Paris Saint-Germain	38	15	15	8	56	41	+15	60	Qualification to Europa League play-off round (Note: As 2010–11 Coupe de France winners Lille qualified for the UEFA Champions League and cup runners-up Paris St. Germain were already ensured of a UEFA Europa League spot via league placement, the play-off round berth reserved for the cup winners was awarded to Sochaux, the fifth-placed team.)
5	Sochaux	38	17	7	14	60	43	+17	58	Qualification to Europa League play-off round
6	Rennes	38	15	11	12	38	35	+3	56	Qualification to Europa League third qualifying round (Note: As Coupe de la Ligue winners Marseille qualified for the UEFA Champions League, the UEFA Europa League third qualification round berth reserved for the League Cup winners was awarded to Rennes, the sixth-placed team.)
7	Bordeaux	38	12	15	11	43	42	+1	51	
8	Toulouse	38	14	8	16	38	36	+2	50	
9	Auxerre	38	10	19	9	45	41	+4	49	
10	Saint-Étienne	38	12	13	13	46	47	−1	49	
11	Lorient	38	12	13	13	46	48	−2	49	
12	Valenciennes	38	10	18	10	45	41	+4	48	
13	Nancy	38	13	9	16	43	48	−5	48	
14	Montpellier	38	12	11	15	32	43	−11	47	
15	Caen	38	11	13	14	46	51	−5	46	
16	Brest	38	11	13	14	36	43	−7	46	
17	Nice	38	11	13	14	33	48	−15	46	
18	Monaco (R)	38	9	17	12	36	40	−4	44	Relegation to Ligue 2
19	Lens (R)	38	7	14	17	35	58	−23	35	Relegation to Ligue 2
20	Arles-Avignon (R)	38	3	11	24	21	70	−49	20	Relegation to Ligue 2

Source: Ligue 1
Rules for classification: 1) points; 2) goal difference; 3) number of goals scored.
(C) Champions; (R) Relegated

== 2011-12 Ligue 1 ==
=== League table ===
Pos	Team	Pld	W	D	L	GF	GA	GD	Pts	Qualification or relegation
1	Montpellier (C)	38	25	7	6	68	34	+34	82	Qualification to Champions League group stage
2	Paris Saint-Germain	38	23	10	5	75	41	+34	79	Qualification to Champions League group stage
3	Lille	38	21	11	6	72	39	+33	74	Qualification to Champions League play-off round
4	Lyon	38	19	7	12	64	51	+13	64	Qualification to Europa League group stage (Note: Lyon won the 2011–12 Coupe de France and thus qualified for the group stage of the 2012–13 UEFA Europa League. Since they finished 4th, the spot for the Europa League play-off round goes to the fifth-placed team.)
5	Bordeaux	38	16	13	9	53	41	+12	61	Qualification to Europa League play-off round
6	Rennes	38	17	9	12	53	44	+9	60	
7	Saint-Étienne	38	16	9	13	49	45	+4	57	
8	Toulouse	38	15	11	12	37	34	+3	56	
9	Evian	38	13	11	14	54	55	−1	50	
10	Marseille	38	12	12	14	45	41	+4	48	Qualification to Europa League third qualifying round (Note: Marseille, as winners of the 2011–12 Coupe de la Ligue, qualified for the third qualifying round of 2012–13 UEFA Europa League.)
11	Nancy	38	11	12	15	38	48	−10	45	
12	Valenciennes	38	12	7	19	40	50	−10	43	
13	Nice	38	10	12	16	39	46	−7	42	
14	Sochaux	38	11	9	18	40	60	−20	42	
15	Brest	38	8	17	13	31	38	−7	41	
16	Ajaccio	38	9	14	15	40	61	−21	41	
17	Lorient	38	9	12	17	35	49	−14	39	
18	Caen (R)	38	9	11	18	39	59	−20	38	Relegation to Ligue 2
19	Dijon (R)	38	9	9	20	38	63	−25	36	Relegation to Ligue 2
20	Auxerre (R)	38	7	13	18	46	57	−11	34	Relegation to Ligue 2

Source: Ligue 1
Rules for classification: 1) points; 2) goal difference; 3) number of goals scored.
(C) Champions; (R) Relegated

== 2012-13 Ligue 1 ==
=== League table ===
Pos	Team	Pld	W	D	L	GF	GA	GD	Pts	Qualification or relegation
1	Paris Saint-Germain (C)	38	25	8	5	69	23	+46	83	Qualification for the Champions League group stage
2	Marseille	38	21	8	9	42	36	+6	71	Qualification for the Champions League group stage
3	Lyon	38	19	10	9	61	38	+23	67	Qualification for the Champions League third qualifying round
4	Nice	38	18	10	10	57	46	+11	64	Qualification for the Europa League play-off round
5	Saint-Étienne	38	16	15	7	60	32	+28	63	Qualification for the Europa League third qualifying round (Note: Saint-Étienne, as winner of the 2012–13 Coupe de la Ligue, qualifies for the third qualifying round of 2013–14 UEFA Europa League.)
6	Lille	38	16	14	8	59	40	+19	62	
7	Bordeaux	38	13	16	9	40	34	+6	55	Qualification for the Europa League group stage (Note: Bordeaux, winner of the 2012–13 Coupe de France, qualified for the Group stage of 2013–14 UEFA Europa League.)
8	Lorient	38	14	11	13	57	58	−1	53	
9	Montpellier	38	15	7	16	54	51	+3	52	
10	Toulouse	38	13	12	13	49	47	+2	51	
11	Valenciennes	38	12	12	14	49	53	−4	48	
12	Bastia	38	13	8	17	50	66	−16	47	
13	Rennes	38	13	7	18	48	59	−11	46	
14	Reims	38	10	13	15	33	42	−9	43	
15	Sochaux	38	10	11	17	41	57	−16	41	
16	Evian	38	10	10	18	46	53	−7	40	
17	Ajaccio	38	9	15	14	39	51	−12	40 (Note: On 9 August 2012, Ajaccio was docked two points, one suspended, by the Disciplinary Committee of the Ligue de Football Professionnel for the 2012–13 season because of incidents during a 2011–12 league match against Lyon.)	
18	Nancy (R)	38	9	11	18	38	58	−20	38	Relegation to Ligue 2
19	Troyes (R)	38	8	13	17	43	61	−18	37	Relegation to Ligue 2
20	Brest (R)	38	8	5	25	32	62	−30	29	Relegation to Ligue 2

Source: Ligue 1
Rules for classification: 1) points; 2) goal difference; 3) number of goals scored.
(C) Champions; (R) Relegated

== 2013-14 Ligue 1 ==
=== League table ===
Pos	Team	Pld	W	D	L	GF	GA	GD	Pts	Qualification or relegation
1	Paris Saint-Germain (C)	38	27	8	3	84	23	+61	89	Qualification for the Champions League group stage (Note: Paris Saint-Germain qualified for the Europa League third qualifying round by winning the 2013–14 Coupe de la Ligue. However, since they already qualified for European competition based on their league position, the spots awarded to the cup winners were passed down the league.)
2	Monaco (Note: Monaco were deducted 2 points due to poor fan behavior in a match last season. However this was overturned on 13 August 2013.)	38	23	11	4	63	31	+32	80	Qualification for the Champions League group stage
3	Lille	38	20	11	7	46	26	+20	71	Qualification for the Champions League third qualifying round
4	Saint-Étienne	38	20	9	9	56	34	+22	69	Qualification for the Europa League play-off round
5	Lyon	38	17	10	11	56	44	+12	61	Qualification for the Europa League third qualifying round
6	Marseille	38	16	12	10	53	40	+13	60	
7	Bordeaux	38	13	14	11	49	43	+6	53	
8	Lorient	38	13	10	15	48	53	−5	49	
9	Toulouse	38	12	13	13	46	53	−7	49	
10	Bastia	38	13	10	15	42	56	−14	49	
11	Reims	38	12	12	14	44	52	−8	48	
12	Rennes	38	11	13	14	47	45	+2	46	
13	Nantes	38	12	10	16	38	43	−5	46	
14	Evian	38	11	11	16	39	51	−12	44	
15	Montpellier	38	8	18	12	45	53	−8	42	
16	Guingamp	38	11	9	18	34	42	−8	42	Qualification for the Europa League group stage
17	Nice	38	12	6	20	30	44	−14	42	
18	Sochaux (R)	38	10	10	18	37	61	−24	40	Relegation to Ligue 2
19	Valenciennes (R)	38	7	8	23	37	65	−28	29	Relegation to Ligue 2
20	Ajaccio (R)	38	4	11	23	37	72	−35	23	Relegation to Ligue 2

Source: Ligue 1
Rules for classification: 1) Points; 2) Goal difference; 3) Number of goals scored
(C) Champions; (R) Relegated

== 2014-15 Ligue 1 ==
=== League table ===
Pos	Team	Pld	W	D	L	GF	GA	GD	Pts	Qualification or relegation
1	Paris Saint-Germain (C)	38	24	11	3	83	36	+47	83	Qualification for the Champions League group stage
2	Lyon	38	22	9	7	72	33	+39	75	Qualification for the Champions League group stage
3	Monaco	38	20	11	7	51	26	+25	71	Qualification for the Champions League third qualifying round
4	Marseille	38	21	6	11	76	42	+34	69	Qualification for the Europa League group stage
5	Saint-Étienne	38	19	12	7	51	30	+21	69	Qualification for the Europa League third qualifying round (Note: Since winners of the 2014–15 Coupe de la Ligue, Paris Saint-Germain, qualified for European competition based on their league position, the spot awarded to the Coupe de la Ligue winner (Europa League third qualifying round) is passed to the next best team in the table not already qualified for any European competition (in this case, the fifth-placed team).)
6	Bordeaux	38	17	12	9	47	44	+3	63	Qualification for the Europa League third qualifying round
7	Montpellier	38	16	8	14	46	39	+7	56	
8	Lille	38	16	8	14	43	42	+1	56	
9	Rennes	38	13	11	14	35	42	−7	50	
10	Guingamp	38	15	4	19	41	55	−14	49	
11	Nice	38	13	9	16	44	53	−9	48	
12	Bastia	38	12	11	15	37	46	−9	47	
13	Caen	38	12	10	16	54	55	−1	46	
14	Nantes	38	11	12	15	29	40	−11	45	
15	Reims	38	12	8	18	47	66	−19	44	
16	Lorient	38	12	7	19	44	50	−6	43	
17	Toulouse	38	12	6	20	43	64	−21	42	
18	Evian (R)	38	11	4	23	41	62	−21	37	Relegation to Ligue 2
19	Metz (R)	38	7	9	22	31	61	−30	30	Relegation to Ligue 2
20	Lens (Note: It was announced on 29 January 2015 that Lens' promotion from Ligue 2 at the end of the 2013–14 season has been ruled invalid, and will thus be automatically relegated to Ligue 2 for the 2015–16 season, regardless of where the team place this season. It has been confirmed by the French Football Federation that the decision of the Administrative Court of Besançon will be appealed.) (D, R)	38	7	8	23	32	61	−29	29	Relegation to Ligue 2

Source: Ligue 1
Rules for classification: 1) points; 2) goal difference; 3) number of goals scored
(C) Champions; (D) Disqualified; (R) Relegated

== 2015-16 Ligue 1 ==
=== League table ===
Pos	Team	Pld	W	D	L	GF	GA	GD	Pts	Qualification or relegation
1	Paris Saint-Germain (C)	38	30	6	2	102	19	+83	96	Qualification for the Champions League group stage
2	Lyon	38	19	8	11	67	43	+24	65	Qualification for the Champions League group stage
3	Monaco	38	17	14	7	57	50	+7	65	Qualification for the Champions League third qualifying round
4	Nice	38	18	9	11	58	41	+17	63	Qualification for the Europa League group stage (Note: Since the winners of the 2015–16 Coupe de France and the 2015–16 Coupe de la Ligue, Paris Saint-Germain, qualified for European competition based on their league position, the spot awarded to the Coupe de France winners (Europa League group stage) was passed to the fourth-placed team and the spot awarded to the Coupe de la Ligue winners (Europa League third qualifying round) was passed to the sixth-placed team. The fifth-placed team received the spot in Europa League third qualifying round originally designated to the fourth-placed team.)
5	Lille	38	15	15	8	39	27	+12	60	Qualification for the Europa League third qualifying round
6	Saint-Étienne	38	17	7	14	42	37	+5	58	Qualification for the Europa League third qualifying round
7	Caen	38	16	6	16	39	52	−13	54	
8	Rennes	38	13	13	12	52	54	−2	52	
9	Angers	38	13	11	14	40	38	+2	50	
10	Bastia	38	14	8	16	36	42	−6	50	
11	Bordeaux	38	12	14	12	50	57	−7	50	
12	Montpellier	38	14	7	17	49	47	+2	49	
13	Marseille	38	10	18	10	48	42	+6	48	
14	Nantes	38	12	12	14	33	44	−11	48	
15	Lorient	38	11	13	14	47	58	−11	46	
16	Guingamp	38	11	11	16	47	56	−9	44	
17	Toulouse	38	9	13	16	45	55	−10	40	
18	Reims (R)	38	10	9	19	44	57	−13	39	Relegation to Ligue 2 (Note: Starting this season, Ligue 1 decided to reduce the number of relegation spots from three to two. However, the decision was appealed and overturned so three teams were relegated.)
19	Gazélec Ajaccio (R)	38	8	13	17	37	58	−21	37	Relegation to Ligue 2
20	Troyes (R)	38	3	9	26	28	83	−55	18	Relegation to Ligue 2

Source: Ligue 1, Soccerway
Rules for classification: 1) Points; 2) Goal difference; 3) Goals scored; 4) Head-to-head points; 5) Head-to-head goal difference; 6) Fairplay ranking.
(C) Champions; (R) Relegated

== 2016-17 Ligue 1 ==
=== League table ===
Pos	Team	Pld	W	D	L	GF	GA	GD	Pts	Qualification or relegation
1	Monaco (C)	38	30	5	3	107	31	+76	95	Qualification for the Champions League group stage
2	Paris Saint-Germain	38	27	6	5	83	27	+56	87	Qualification for the Champions League group stage
3	Nice	38	22	12	4	63	36	+27	78	Qualification for the Champions League third qualifying round
4	Lyon	38	21	4	13	77	48	+29	67	Qualification for the Europa League group stage (Note: Since the winners of the 2016–17 Coupe de France and the 2016–17 Coupe de la Ligue, Paris Saint-Germain, qualified for European competition based on league position, the spot awarded to the Coupe de France winners (Europa League group stage) was passed to the fourth-placed team and the spot awarded to the Coupe de la Ligue winners (Europa League third qualifying round) was passed to the sixth-placed team. The fifth-placed team received the spot in Europa League third qualifying round originally designated to the fourth-placed team.)
5	Marseille	38	17	11	10	57	41	+16	62	Qualification for the Europa League third qualifying round
6	Bordeaux	38	15	14	9	53	43	+10	59	Qualification for the Europa League third qualifying round
7	Nantes	38	14	9	15	40	54	−14	51	
8	Saint-Étienne	38	12	14	12	41	42	−1	50	
9	Rennes	38	12	14	12	36	42	−6	50	
10	Guingamp	38	14	8	16	46	53	−7	50	
11	Lille	38	13	7	18	40	47	−7	46	
12	Angers	38	13	7	18	40	49	−9	46	
13	Toulouse	38	10	14	14	37	41	−4	44	
14	Metz	38	11	10	17	39	72	−33	43	
15	Montpellier	38	10	9	19	48	66	−18	39	
16	Dijon	38	8	13	17	46	58	−12	37	
17	Caen	38	10	7	21	36	65	−29	37	
18	Lorient (R)	38	10	6	22	44	70	−26	36	Qualification for the relegation play-offs
19	Nancy (R)	38	9	8	21	29	52	−23	35	Relegation to Ligue 2
20	Bastia (D, R)	38	8	10	20	29	54	−25	34	Relegation to National 3 (Note: After being relegated to Ligue 2, Bastia was initially further relegated to National due to financial difficulties. On 10 August 2017, the FFF announced that Bastia was denied entry to National. The club therefore took the place of its reserve team in Championnat National 3.)

Source: Ligue 1, Soccerway
Rules for classification: 1) Points; 2) Goal difference; 3) Goals scored; 4) Head-to-head goal difference; 5) Fairplay ranking.
(C) Champions; (D) Disqualified; (R) Relegated

== 2017-18 Ligue 1 ==
=== League table ===
Pos	Team	Pld	W	D	L	GF	GA	GD	Pts	Qualification or relegation
1	Paris Saint-Germain (C)	38	29	6	3	108	29	+79	93	Qualification for the Champions League group stage
2	Monaco	38	24	8	6	85	45	+40	80	Qualification for the Champions League group stage
3	Lyon	38	23	9	6	87	43	+44	78	Qualification for the Champions League group stage
4	Marseille	38	22	11	5	80	47	+33	77	Qualification for the Europa League group stage (Note: Since the winners of the 2017–18 Coupe de France and the 2017–18 Coupe de la Ligue, Paris Saint-Germain, qualified for European competition based on league position, the spot awarded to the Coupe de France winners (Europa League group stage) was passed to the fourth-placed team and the spot awarded to the Coupe de la Ligue winners (Europa League third qualifying round) was passed to the sixth-placed team. The fifth-placed team received the spot in Europa League third qualifying round originally designated to the fourth-placed team.)
5	Rennes	38	16	10	12	50	44	+6	58	Qualification for the Europa League group stage
6	Bordeaux	38	16	7	15	53	48	+5	55	Qualification for the Europa League second qualifying round
7	Saint-Étienne	38	15	10	13	47	50	−3	55	
8	Nice	38	15	9	14	53	52	+1	54	
9	Nantes	38	14	10	14	36	41	−5	52	
10	Montpellier	38	11	18	9	36	33	+3	51	
11	Dijon	38	13	9	16	55	73	−18	48	
12	Guingamp	38	12	11	15	48	59	−11	47	
13	Amiens	38	12	9	17	37	42	−5	45	
14	Angers	38	9	14	15	42	52	−10	41	
15	Strasbourg	38	9	11	18	44	67	−23	38	
16	Caen	38	10	8	20	27	52	−25	38	
17	Lille	38	10	8	20	41	67	−26	38	
18	Toulouse (O)	38	9	10	19	38	54	−16	37	Qualification for the relegation play-off final
19	Troyes (R)	38	9	6	23	32	59	−27	33	Relegation to Ligue 2
20	Metz (R)	38	6	8	24	34	76	−42	26	Relegation to Ligue 2

Source: Ligue 1 and Soccerway
Rules for classification: 1) Points; 2) Goal difference; 3) Head-to-head points; 4) Head-to-head goal difference; 5) Head-to-head goals scored; 6) Head-to-head away goals; 7) Goals scored; 8) Away goals scored; 9) Most goals scored in one league match; 10) Fair-play points
(C) Champions; (O) Play-off winners; (R) Relegated

== 2018-19 Ligue 1 ==
=== League table ===
Pos	Team	Pld	W	D	L	GF	GA	GD	Pts	Qualification or relegation
1	Paris Saint-Germain (C)	38	29	4	5	105	35	+70	91	Qualification to Champions League group stage
2	Lille	38	22	9	7	68	33	+35	75	Qualification to Champions League group stage
3	Lyon	38	21	9	8	70	47	+23	72	Qualification to Champions League group stage
4	Saint-Étienne	38	19	9	10	59	41	+18	66	Qualification to Europa League group stage
5	Marseille	38	18	7	13	60	52	+8	61	
6	Montpellier	38	15	14	9	53	42	+11	59	
7	Nice	38	15	11	12	30	35	−5	56	
8	Reims	38	13	16	9	39	42	−3	55	
9	Nîmes	38	15	8	15	57	58	−1	53	
10	Rennes	38	13	13	12	55	52	+3	52	Qualification to Europa League group stage (Note: Rennes qualified for the Europa League group stage by winning the 2018–19 Coupe de France.)
11	Strasbourg	38	11	16	11	58	48	+10	49	Qualification to Europa League second qualifying round (Note: Strasbourg qualified for the Europa League second qualifying round by winning the 2018–19 Coupe de la Ligue.)
12	Nantes	38	13	9	16	48	48	0	48	
13	Angers	38	10	16	12	44	49	−5	46	
14	Bordeaux	38	10	11	17	34	42	−8	41	
15	Amiens	38	9	11	18	31	52	−21	38	
16	Toulouse	38	8	14	16	35	57	−22	38	
17	Monaco	38	8	12	18	38	57	−19	36	
18	Dijon (O)	38	9	7	22	31	60	−29	34	Qualification to Relegation play-offs
19	Caen (R)	38	7	12	19	29	54	−25	33	Relegation to Ligue 2
20	Guingamp (R)	38	5	12	21	28	68	−40	27	Relegation to Ligue 2

Source: Ligue 1 and Soccerway
Rules for classification: 1) Points; 2) Goal difference; 3) Head-to-head points; 4) Head-to-head goal difference; 5) Head-to-head goals scored; 6) Head-to-head away goals scored; 7) Goals scored; 8) Away goals scored; 9) Most goals scored in single league match; 10) Fairplay ranking.
(C) Champions; (O) Play-off winners; (R) Relegated

== 2019-20 Ligue 1 ==
=== League table ===
Pos	Team	Pld	W	D	L	GF	GA	GD	Pts	PPG	Qualification or relegation
1	Paris Saint-Germain (C)	27	22	2	3	75	24	+51	68	2.52	Qualification for the Champions League group stage
2	Marseille	28	16	8	4	41	29	+12	56	2.00	Qualification for the Champions League group stage
3	Rennes	28	15	5	8	38	24	+14	50	1.79	Qualification for the Champions League group stage
4	Lille	28	15	4	9	35	27	+8	49	1.75	Qualification for the Europa League group stage (Note: Since the winners of the Coupe de France and the Coupe de la Ligue, Paris Saint-Germain, qualified for the Champions League, the spot given to the Coupe de France winners (Europa League group stage) was passed to the fifth-placed team and the spot given to the Coupe de la Ligue winners (Europa League second qualifying round) was passed to the sixth-placed team.)
5	Nice	28	11	8	9	41	38	+3	41 (Note: Nice finished ahead of Reims on head-to-head points: Nice 2–0 Reims, Reims 1–1 Nice.)	1.46	Qualification for the Europa League group stage
6	Reims	28	10	11	7	26	21	+5	41	1.46	Qualification for the Europa League second qualifying round
7	Lyon	28	11	7	10	42	27	+15	40	1.43	
8	Montpellier	28	11	7	10	35	34	+1	40	1.43	
9	Monaco	28	11	7	10	44	44	0	40	1.43	
10	Strasbourg	27	11	5	11	32	32	0	38	1.41	
11	Angers	28	11	6	11	28	33	−5	39	1.39	
12	Bordeaux	28	9	10	9	40	34	+6	37 (Note: Bordeaux finished ahead of Nantes on head-to-head points: Bordeaux 2–0 Nantes, Nantes 0–1 Bordeaux.)	1.32	
13	Nantes	28	11	4	13	28	31	−3	37	1.32	
14	Brest	28	8	10	10	34	37	−3	34	1.21	
15	Metz	28	8	10	10	27	35	−8	34	1.21	
16	Dijon	28	7	9	12	27	37	−10	30	1.07	
17	Saint-Étienne	28	8	6	14	29	45	−16	30	1.07	
18	Nîmes (Note: Originally, the 18th-placed Ligue 1 team would play in promotion-relegation play-offs at the end of the season with a team from Ligue 2 to decide whether they would remain in Ligue 1 for the 2020–21 season, but the play-offs were cancelled and the 18th-placed team remained in Ligue 1.)	28	7	6	15	29	44	−15	27	0.96	
19	Amiens (R)	28	4	11	13	31	50	−19	23	0.82	Relegation to Ligue 2
20	Toulouse (R)	28	3	4	21	22	58	−36	13	0.46	Relegation to Ligue 2

Source: Ligue 1
Rules for classification: 1) Points per game; 2) Head-to-head points; 3) Head-to-head goal difference; 4) Goal difference; 5) Goals scored; 6) Fairplay ranking.
(C) Champions; (R) Relegated

== 2020-21 Ligue 1 ==
=== League table ===
Pos	Team	Pld	W	D	L	GF	GA	GD	Pts	Qualification or relegation
1	Lille (C)	38	24	11	3	64	23	+41	83	Qualification for the Champions League group stage
2	Paris Saint-Germain	38	26	4	8	86	28	+58	82	Qualification for the Champions League group stage
3	Monaco	38	24	6	8	76	42	+34	78	Qualification for the Champions League third qualifying round
4	Lyon	38	22	10	6	81	43	+38	76	Qualification for the Europa League group stage (Note: Since the winners of the 2020–21 Coupe de France, Paris Saint-Germain, qualified for European competition based on league position, the Europa League group stage spot reserved for the cup winners was passed to the fifth-placed team, and the Europa Conference League play-off round spot was passed to the sixth-placed team.)
5	Marseille	38	16	12	10	54	47	+7	60	Qualification for the Europa League group stage
6	Rennes	38	16	10	12	52	40	+12	58	Qualification for the Europa Conference League play-off round
7	Lens	38	15	12	11	55	54	+1	57	
8	Montpellier	38	14	12	12	60	62	−2	54	
9	Nice	38	15	7	16	50	53	−3	52	
10	Metz	38	12	11	15	44	48	−4	47	
11	Saint-Étienne	38	12	10	16	42	54	−12	46	
12	Bordeaux	38	13	6	19	42	56	−14	45	
13	Angers	38	12	8	18	40	58	−18	44	
14	Reims	38	9	15	14	42	50	−8	42	
15	Strasbourg	38	11	9	18	49	58	−9	42	
16	Lorient	38	11	9	18	50	68	−18	42	
17	Brest	38	11	8	19	50	66	−16	41	
18	Nantes (O)	38	9	13	16	47	55	−8	40	Qualification for the Relegation play-offs
19	Nîmes (R)	38	9	8	21	40	71	−31	35	Relegation to the Ligue 2
20	Dijon (R)	38	4	9	25	25	73	−48	21	Relegation to the Ligue 2

Source: Ligue 1
Rules for classification: 1) Points; 2) Goal difference; 3) Goals scored; 4) Head-to-head goal difference; 5) Fairplay ranking.
(C) Champions; (O) Play-off winners; (R) Relegated

== 2021-22 Ligue 1 ==
=== League table ===
Pos	Team	Pld	W	D	L	GF	GA	GD	Pts	Qualification or relegation
1	Paris Saint-Germain (C)	38	26	8	4	90	36	+54	86	Qualification for the Champions League group stage
2	Marseille	38	21	8	9	63	38	+25	71	Qualification for the Champions League group stage
3	Monaco	38	20	9	9	65	40	+25	69	Qualification for the Champions League third qualifying round
4	Rennes	38	20	6	12	82	40	+42	66	Qualification for the Europa League group stage
5	Nice	38	20	7	11	52	36	+16	66 (Note: Nice were deducted one point for uncontrolled crowd trouble that caused the abandonment of their match against Marseille.)	Qualification for the Europa Conference League play-off round
6	Strasbourg	38	17	12	9	60	43	+17	63	
7	Lens	38	17	11	10	62	48	+14	62	
8	Lyon	38	17	11	10	66	51	+15	61 (Note: Lyon were deducted one point for uncontrolled crowd trouble that caused the abandonment of their match against Marseille.)	
9	Nantes	38	15	10	13	55	48	+7	55	Qualification for the Europa League group stage (Note: Nantes qualified for the Europa League group stage as the 2021–22 Coupe de France winners.)
10	Lille	38	14	13	11	48	48	0	55	
11	Brest	38	13	9	16	49	57	−8	48	
12	Reims	38	11	13	14	43	44	−1	46	
13	Montpellier	38	12	7	19	49	61	−12	43	
14	Angers	38	10	11	17	44	55	−11	41	
15	Troyes	38	9	11	18	37	53	−16	38	
16	Lorient	38	8	12	18	35	63	−28	36	
17	Clermont	38	9	9	20	38	69	−31	36	
18	Saint-Étienne (R)	38	7	11	20	42	77	−35	32	Qualification for the relegation play-offs
19	Metz (R)	38	6	13	19	35	69	−34	31	Relegation to Ligue 2 (Note: Bordeaux were initially relegated to Ligue 2. However, on 14 June it was decided by the DNCG to relegate Bordeaux administratively to the Championnat National for financial issues. On 27 July 2022, Bordeaux won its appeal and was officially maintained in Ligue 2 for the 2022–23 season.)
20	Bordeaux (R)	38	6	13	19	52	91	−39	31	Relegation to Ligue 2

Source: Ligue 1
Rules for classification: 1) Points; 2) Goal difference; 3) Head-to-head points; 4) Head-to-head goal difference; 5) Head-to-head goals scored; 6) Head-to-head away goals scored; 7) Goals scored; 8) Away goals scored; 9) Fair-play points (Note: Head-to-head record is used only after all the matches between the teams in question have been played).
(C) Champions; (R) Relegated

== 2022-23 Ligue 1 ==
=== League table ===
Pos	Team	Pld	W	D	L	GF	GA	GD	Pts	Qualification or relegation
1	Paris Saint-Germain (C)	38	27	4	7	89	40	+49	85	Qualification for the Champions League group stage
2	Lens	38	25	9	4	68	29	+39	84	Qualification for the Champions League group stage
3	Marseille	38	22	7	9	67	40	+27	73	Qualification for the Champions League third qualifying round
4	Rennes	38	21	5	12	69	39	+30	68	Qualification for the Europa League group stage
5	Lille	38	19	10	9	65	44	+21	67	Qualification for the Europa Conference League play-off round
6	Monaco	38	19	8	11	70	58	+12	65	
7	Lyon	38	18	8	12	65	47	+18	62	
8	Clermont	38	17	8	13	45	49	−4	59	
9	Nice	38	15	13	10	48	37	+11	58	
10	Lorient	38	15	10	13	52	53	−1	55	
11	Reims	38	12	15	11	45	45	0	51	
12	Montpellier	38	15	5	18	65	62	+3	50	
13	Toulouse	38	13	9	16	51	57	−6	48	Qualification for the Europa League group stage (Note: Toulouse qualified for the Europa League group stage as the 2022–23 Coupe de France winners.)
14	Brest	38	11	11	16	44	54	−10	44	
15	Strasbourg	38	9	13	16	51	59	−8	40	
16	Nantes	38	7	15	16	37	55	−18	36	
17	Auxerre (R)	38	8	11	19	35	63	−28	35	Relegation to Ligue 2
18	Ajaccio (R)	38	7	5	26	23	74	−51	26	Relegation to Ligue 2
19	Troyes (R)	38	4	12	22	45	81	−36	24	Relegation to Ligue 2
20	Angers (R)	38	4	6	28	33	81	−48	18	Relegation to Ligue 2

Source: Ligue 1
Rules for classification: 1) Points; 2) Goal difference; 3) Head-to-head points; 4) Head-to-head goal difference; 5) Head-to-head goals scored; 6) Head-to-head away goals scored; 7) Goals scored; 8) Away goals scored; 9) Fair-play points (Note: Head-to-head record is used only after all the matches between the teams in question have been played).
(C) Champions; (R) Relegated

== 2023-24 Ligue 1 ==
=== League table ===
Pos	Team	Pld	W	D	L	GF	GA	GD	Pts	Qualification or relegation
1	Paris Saint-Germain (C)	34	22	10	2	81	33	+48	76	Qualification for the Champions League league phase
2	Monaco	34	20	7	7	68	42	+26	67	Qualification for the Champions League league phase
3	Brest	34	17	10	7	53	34	+19	61	Qualification for the Champions League league phase
4	Lille	34	16	11	7	52	34	+18	59	Qualification for the Champions League third qualifying round
5	Nice	34	15	10	9	40	29	+11	55	Qualification for the Europa League league phase (Note: Since the 2023–24 Coupe de France winners, Paris Saint-Germain, qualified for the Champions League via league position, the Europa League berth awarded to the cup winners was passed to the sixth-placed team and the Conference League berth was passed to the seventh-placed team.)
6	Lyon	34	16	5	13	49	55	−6	53	Qualification for the Europa League league phase
7	Lens	34	14	9	11	45	37	+8	51	Qualification for the Conference League play-off round
8	Marseille	34	13	11	10	52	41	+11	50	
9	Reims	34	13	8	13	42	47	−5	47	
10	Rennes	34	12	10	12	53	46	+7	46	
11	Toulouse	34	11	10	13	42	46	−4	43	
12	Montpellier (Note: Montpellier was deducted one point for uncontrolled crowd trouble that caused the abandonment of its match against Clermont.)	34	10	12	12	43	48	−5	41	
13	Strasbourg	34	10	9	15	38	50	−12	39	
14	Nantes	34	9	6	19	30	55	−25	33	
15	Le Havre	34	7	11	16	34	45	−11	32	
16	Metz (R)	34	8	5	21	35	58	−23	29 (Note: Metz finished ahead of Lorient on head-to-head away goals scored: Lorient 2–3 Metz, Metz 1–2 Lorient.)	Qualification for the Relegation play-offs
17	Lorient (R)	34	7	8	19	43	66	−23	29	Relegation to Ligue 2
18	Clermont (R)	34	5	10	19	26	60	−34	25	Relegation to Ligue 2

Source: Ligue 1
Rules for classification: 1) Points; 2) Goal difference; 3) Head-to-head points; 4) Head-to-head goal difference; 5) Head-to-head goals scored; 6) Head-to-head away goals scored; 7) Goals scored; 8) Away goals scored; 9) Fair-play points (Note: Head-to-head record is used only after all the matches between the teams in question have been played).
(C) Champions; (R) Relegated

== 2024-25 Ligue 1 ==
=== League table ===
Pos	Team	Pld	W	D	L	GF	GA	GD	Pts	Qualification or relegation
1	Paris Saint-Germain (C)	34	26	6	2	92	35	+57	84	Qualification for the Champions League league phase
2	Marseille	34	20	5	9	74	47	+27	65	Qualification for the Champions League league phase
3	Monaco	34	18	7	9	63	41	+22	61	Qualification for the Champions League league phase
4	Nice	34	17	9	8	66	41	+25	60	Qualification for the Champions League third qualifying round
5	Lille	34	17	9	8	52	36	+16	60	Qualification for the Europa League league phase (Note: Since the 2024–25 Coupe de France winners, Paris Saint-Germain, qualified for the Champions League via league position, the Europa League berth awarded to the cup winners was passed to the sixth-placed team and the Conference League berth was passed to the seventh-placed team.)
6	Lyon	34	17	6	11	65	46	+19	57	Qualification for the Europa League league phase
7	Strasbourg	34	16	9	9	56	44	+12	57	Qualification for the Conference League play-off round
8	Lens	34	15	7	12	42	39	+3	52	
9	Brest	34	15	5	14	52	59	−7	50	
10	Toulouse	34	11	9	14	44	43	+1	42	
11	Auxerre	34	11	9	14	48	51	−3	42	
12	Rennes	34	13	2	19	51	50	+1	41	
13	Nantes	34	8	12	14	39	52	−13	36	
14	Angers	34	10	6	18	32	53	−21	36	
15	Le Havre	34	10	4	20	40	71	−31	34	
16	Reims (R)	34	8	9	17	33	47	−14	33	Qualification for the relegation play-offs
17	Saint-Étienne (R)	34	8	6	20	39	77	−38	30	Relegation to Ligue 2
18	Montpellier (R)	34	4	4	26	23	79	−56	16	Relegation to Ligue 2

Source: Ligue 1
Rules for classification: 1) Points; 2) Goal difference; 3) Head-to-head points; 4) Head-to-head goal difference; 5) Head-to-head goals scored; 6) Head-to-head away goals scored; 7) Goals scored; 8) Away goals scored; 9) Fair-play points (Note: Head-to-head record is used only after all the matches between the teams in question have been played).
(C) Champions; (R) Relegated

== 2025-26 Ligue 1 ==
=== League table ===
Pos	Team	Pld	W	D	L	GF	GA	GD	Pts	Qualification or relegation
1	Paris Saint-Germain (C)	34	24	4	6	74	29	+45	76	Qualification for the Champions League league phase
2	Lens	34	22	4	8	66	35	+31	70	Qualification for the Champions League league phase
3	Lille	34	18	7	9	52	37	+15	61	Qualification for the Champions League league phase
4	Lyon	34	18	6	10	53	40	+13	60	Qualification for the Champions League third qualifying round
5	Marseille	34	18	5	11	63	45	+18	59	Qualification for the Europa League league phase (Note: Since the 2025–26 Coupe de France winners, Lens, qualified for the Champions League via league position, the Europa League spot awarded to the cup winners was passed to the sixth-placed team, and the Conference League spot was passed to the seventh-placed team.)
6	Rennes	34	17	8	9	59	50	+9	59	Qualification for the Europa League league phase
7	Monaco	34	16	6	12	60	54	+6	54	Qualification for the Conference League play-off round
8	Strasbourg	34	15	8	11	58	47	+11	53	
9	Toulouse	34	12	9	13	47	46	+1	45	
10	Lorient	34	11	12	11	48	51	−3	45	
11	Paris FC	34	11	11	12	47	50	−3	44	
12	Brest	34	10	9	15	43	55	−12	39	
13	Angers	34	9	9	16	29	48	−19	36	
14	Le Havre	34	7	14	13	32	44	−12	35	
15	Auxerre	34	8	10	16	34	44	−10	34	
16	Nice (O)	34	7	11	16	37	60	−23	32	Qualification for the relegation play-offs
17	Nantes (R)	34	5	9	20	29	52	−23	24	Relegation to Ligue 2
18	Metz (R)	34	3	8	23	32	76	−44	17	Relegation to Ligue 2

Source: Ligue 1
Rules for classification: 1) Points; 2) Goal difference; 3) Head-to-head points; 4) Head-to-head goal difference; 5) Head-to-head goals scored; 6) Head-to-head away goals scored; 7) Goals scored; 8) Away goals scored; 9) Fair-play points (Note: Head-to-head record is used only after all the matches between the teams in question have been played).
(C) Champions; (O) Play-off winners; (R) Relegated

=== Position by round ===
Team ╲ Round	1	2	3	4	5	6	7	8	9	10	11	12	13	14	15	16	17	18	19	20	21	22	23	24	25	26	27	28	29	30	31	32	33	34
Angers	3	11	8	12	13	17	17	17	15	13	14	13	11	12	11	10	10	11																
Auxerre	2	12	14	15	10	14	16	14	17	17	18	18	18	18	16	16	17	17																
Brest	10	14	17	17	14	9	11	12	12	14	13	15	14	11	10	11	11	10																
Havre	18	16	11	13	15	15	14	16	14	11	12	12	13	14	15	15	13	14																
Lens	17	10	5	9	7	7	6	4	2	6	3	3	3	1	1	1	1	1																
Lille	9	5	3	2	5	6	7	6	5	7	4	5	4	4	4	4	4	5																
Lorient	11	6	15	16	17	13	13	13	16	16	16	17	16	15	13	12	12	12																
Lyon	4	1	2	4	3	2	4	5	4	5	6	7	7	6	5	5	5	4																
Marseille	15	7	10	7	6	3	2	1	3	3	2	2	2	3	3	3	3	3																
Metz	12	18	18	18	18	18	18	18	18	18	17	14	17	17	18	18	18	18																
Monaco	1	8	4	3	1	4	5	7	6	2	5	6	8	7	7	9	9	9																
Nantes	13	15	13	14	16	16	15	15	13	15	15	16	15	16	17	17	16	16																
Nice	14	9	12	8	12	12	12	10	8	8	8	9	9	10	12	13	14	15																
Paris	16	17	16	11	11	11	8	11	11	12	11	11	12	13	14	14	15	13																
PSG	5	3	1	1	2	1	1	2	1	1	1	1	1	2	2	2	2	2																
Rennais	7	13	9	6	8	8	10	9	10	10	10	8	6	5	6	6	6	6																
Strasbourg	6	4	6	5	4	5	3	3	7	4	7	4	5	8	8	7	7	7																
Toulouse	8	2	7	10	9	10	9	8	9	9	9	10	10	9	9	8	8	8																

Champions of 2025-26 Ligue 1
Qualification for Champions League
Qualified for Europe League
Qualified for Conference League
Relegation to Ligue 2

First match(es) will be played on 15 August 2025. Source:
