= Pancrate =

Pancrate is a surname. Notable people with the surname include:

- Fabrice Pancrate (born 1980), French footballer
- Ludovic Pancrate (born 1987), French footballer
