= 2021 Coupe de France final =

Football match between Monaco and Paris Saint-Germain

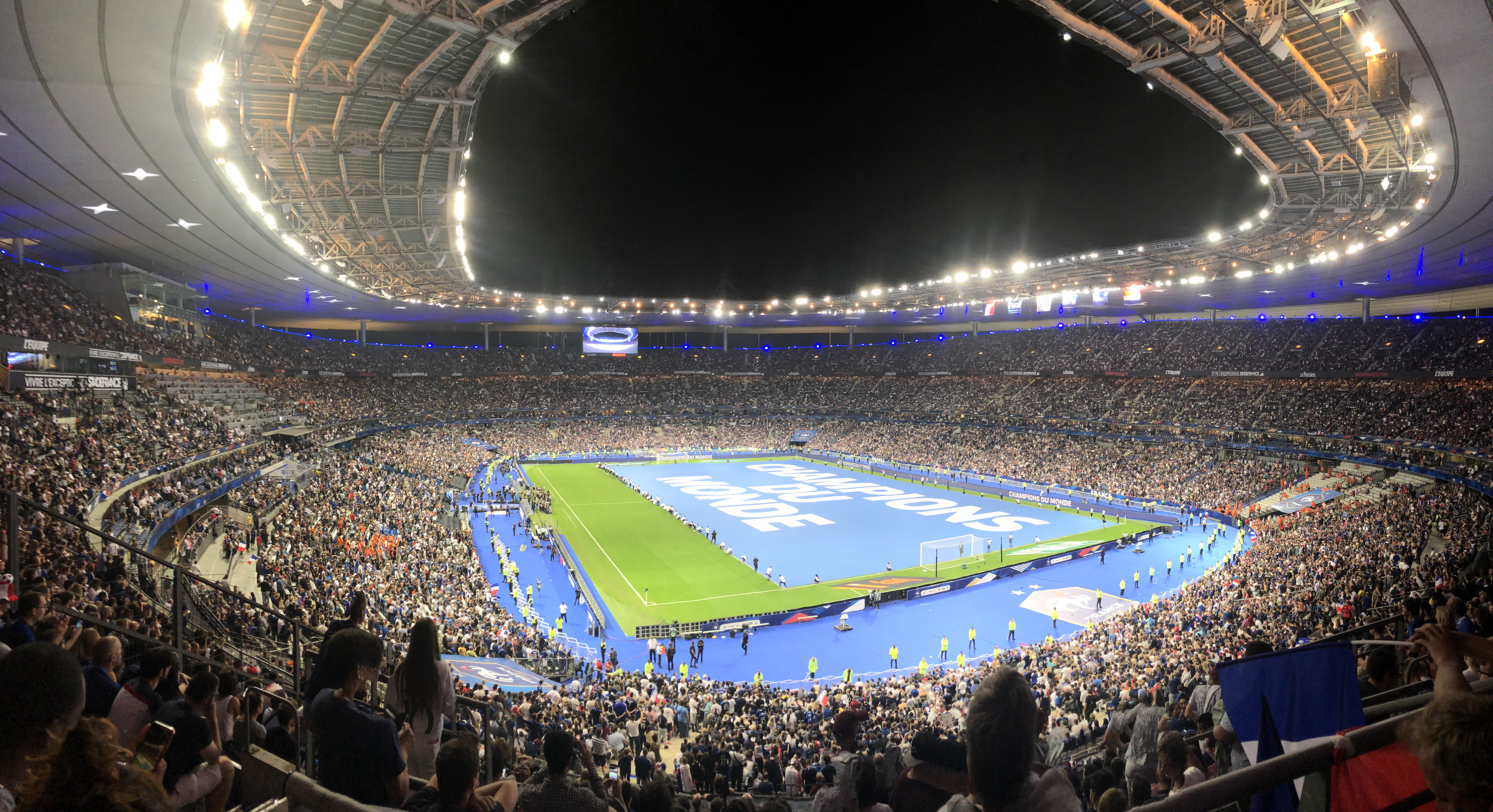
- The Stade de France hosted the final
- Event: 2020–21 Coupe de France
Monaco	Paris Saint-Germain
Ligue 1	Ligue 1
0	2
- Date: 19 May 2021
- Venue: Stade de France, Saint-Denis
- Referee: François Letexier
- Attendance: 0 (Note: The final was played behind closed doors due to the COVID-19 pandemic in France.)

The 2021 Coupe de France final was a football match between Monaco and Paris Saint-Germain to decide the winner of the 2020–21 Coupe de France, the 104th season of the Coupe de France. It took place on 19 May at the Stade de France in Saint-Denis, Paris.

Paris Saint-Germain won the final 2–0 for their record fourteenth Coupe de France title.

== Background ==
Monaco reached the final this year for the tenth time in its history, and the first since 2010, a game they lost to Paris Saint-Germain as well.

Paris Saint-Germain were the defending champions, having won the 2020 final over Saint-Étienne 1–0 for their thirteenth title.

== Route to the final ==
Monaco		Round	Paris Saint-Germain
Opponent	Result	2020–21 Coupe de France	Opponent	Result
Grenoble	1–0 (A)	Round of 64	Caen	1–0 (A)
Nice	2–0 (A)	Round of 32	Brest	3–0 (A)
Metz	0–0 (5–4 pen.) (H)	Round of 16	Lille	3–0 (H)
Lyon	2–0 (A)	Quarter-finals	Angers	5–0 (H)
GFA Rumilly-Vallières	5–1 (A)	Semi-finals	Montpellier	2–2 (6–5 pen.) (A)

Note: H = home fixture, A = away fixture

== Match ==
=== Details ===
19 May 2021
21:15 CEST

Monaco	0–2	Paris Saint-Germain
		Icardi 19'; Mbappé 81'

Stade de France, Saint-Denis
Attendance: 0
Referee: François Letexier

Monaco	Paris Saint-Germain

GK	1	(Poland) Radosław Majecki
RB	29	(France) Djibril Sidibé
CB	20	(France) Axel Disasi	(substituted off) 74'
CB	3	(Chile) Guillermo Maripán
LB	12	(Brazil) Caio Henrique
DM	8	(France) Aurélien Tchouaméni
CM	17	(Russia) Aleksandr Golovin
CM	22	(France) Youssouf Fofana	(substituted off) 60'
RW	26	(France) Ruben Aguilar	(substituted off) 46'
LW	31	(Germany) Kevin Volland	(substituted off) 74'
CF	9	(France) Wissam Ben Yedder (c)	(substituted off) 60'
Substitutes:
GK	30	(Italy) Vito Mannone
DF	2	(Senegal) Fodé Ballo-Touré
DF	32	(France) Benoît Badiashile	(substituted on) 74'
DF	34	(France) Chrislain Matsima
MF	4	(Spain) Cesc Fàbregas	(substituted on) 74'
MF	11	(Portugal) Gelson Martins	(substituted on) 60'
MF	36	(Belgium) Eliot Matazo
FW	10	(Montenegro) Stevan Jovetić	(substituted on) 60'
FW	27	(Senegal) Krépin Diatta	(substituted on) 46'
Manager:
(Croatia) Niko Kovač

GK	1	(Costa Rica) Keylor Navas
RB	24	(Italy) Alessandro Florenzi		(substituted off) 68'
CB	5	(Brazil) Marquinhos (c)	(yellow card) 86'
CB	4	(Germany) Thilo Kehrer
LB	22	(Senegal) Abdou Diallo
CM	8	(Argentina) Leandro Paredes		(substituted off) 79'
CM	15	(Portugal) Danilo Pereira
CM	27	(Senegal) Idrissa Gueye
RW	11	(Argentina) Ángel Di María		(substituted off) 90'
CF	9	(Argentina) Mauro Icardi		(substituted off) 79'
LW	7	(France) Kylian Mbappé
Substitutes:
GK	16	(Spain) Sergio Rico
DF	25	(Netherlands) Mitchel Bakker
DF	31	(France) Colin Dagba		(substituted on) 68'
DF	32	(France) Timothée Pembélé
MF	12	(Brazil) Rafinha
MF	19	(Spain) Pablo Sarabia		(substituted on) 90'
MF	21	(Spain) Ander Herrera		(substituted on) 79'
MF	23	(Germany) Julian Draxler
FW	18	(Italy) Moise Kean		(substituted on) 79'
Manager:
(Argentina) Mauricio Pochettino

Assistant referees:
Mehdi Rahmouni
Cyril Mugnier
Fourth official:
Jérémy Stinat
Video assistant referee:
Willy Delajod
Assistant video assistant referee:
William Lavis

Match rules

- 90 minutes.
- 30 minutes of extra time if necessary.
- Penalty shoot-out if scores still level.
- Nine named substitutes.
- Maximum of five substitutions, with a sixth allowed in extra time. (Note: Each team was given only three opportunities to make substitutions, with a fourth opportunity in extra time, excluding substitutions made at half-time, before the start of extra time and at half-time in extra time.)
