= Rahmane Barry =

Senegalese football player

Personal information
- Full name: Rahmane Barry
- Date of birth: 30 June 1986 (age 40)
- Place of birth: Dakar, Senegal
- Height: 1.80 m (5 ft 11 in)
- Position: Defender

Youth career
- 2003: Marseille

Senior career*
| Years | Team | Apps | (Gls) |
| 2003–2007 | Marseille | 5 | (0) |
| 2005–2007 | → Lorient (loan) | 33 | (3) |
| 2007–2009 | Sedan | 9 | (0) |
| 2008 | → Guegnon (loan) | 10 | (3) |
| 2010–2011 | Beauvais | 3 | (0) |
| 2011 | Bangkok United | 0 | (0) |
| 2012–2021 | Montagnarde | | |

International career
| 2005–2006 | Senegal | 9 | (0) |
- * Club domestic league appearances and goals

Rahmane Barry (born 30 June 1986) is a Senegalese former footballer who played as a defender. Between 2005 and 2006, he made 9 appearances for the Senegal national team.

== Club career ==
Barry was born in Dakar, Senegal. A product of the Marseille youth system, he made his debut in the club's victory over Toulouse on 20 December 2003. He spent two seasons in the senior team before being loaned out to Lorient in August 2005 to gain more playing time.

His contract with the Côte d'Azur side expired in the summer of 2007, and in June of that year he joined Ligue 2 outfit Sedan on a permanent two-year deal. He was then loaned to Gueugnon for six months from 16 January 2008, before returning Sedan. At the end of the 2008-2009season he found himself without a contract.

In October 2010, Barry signed for Championnat National club Beauvais.

In the summer of 2011, he went on trial with Thai club Bangkok United, hoping to rejuvenate his career and "return in six months to Europe". He played friendlies with the club, but a dispute over contract length and agent payments meant he returned to France. He was without a club for the rest of the year and gave up his professional status.

Rahmane joined French amateur side Montagnarde, who were playing in the Championnat de France Amateur 2, in the summer of 2012. He was still playing there as of October 2020.

== International career ==
Barry played international football for Senegal national team and was part of the squad for the 2006 African Cup of Nations in Egypt. Between 2005 and 2006, he made 9 appearances for Senegal.

== Honours ==
Marseille

- UEFA Intertoto Cup: 2005
