= Ismaïl Haddou =

Algerian footballer (born 1996)

Personal information
- Date of birth: 15 February 1996 (age 30)
- Place of birth: Béni Saf, Algeria
- Position: Midfielder

Team information
- Current team: Rousset-Ste Victoire

Youth career
- –2013: Valenciennes
- 2013–2014: Chievo
- 2014–2015: Cesena

Senior career*
| Years | Team | Apps | (Gls) |
| 2014–2015 | → Correggese | 0 | (0) |
| 2015–2017 | Valenciennes B | 26 | (3) |
| 2015–2017 | Valenciennes | 8 | (0) |
| 2017–2018 | Marseille B | 30 | (8) |
| 2018–2019 | Auxerre B | 3 | (0) |
| 2019–2020 | Marseille Endoume | 13 | (3) |
| 2020–2021 | Beauvais | 9 | (3) |
| 2021–2022 | Toulon | 7 | (0) |
| 2022 | Rousset-Ste Victoire | 10 | (5) |
| 2022–2023 | Beauvais | 11 | (3) |
| 2023–2024 | Racing Besançon | 23 | (2) |
| 2024– | Rousset-Ste Victoire | 10 | (4) |
- * Club domestic league appearances and goals as of 7 December 2024

Ismaïl Haddou (born 15 February 1996) is an Algerian footballer who plays for French Championnat National 3 club Rousset-Ste Victoire.

== Personal life ==
Haddou holds both French and Algerian nationalities.
