= GFA Rumilly-Vallières =

French football club, based in Rumilly

Rumilly-Vallières
- Full name: Groupement Football Albanais Rumilly-Vallières
- Founded: 1932
- Ground: Stade des Grangettes, Rumilly, Haute-Savoie
- Co-presidents: Luc Chabert, Bernard Vellut, François Baudet, Bruno Piccon
- Manager: Fatsah Amghar
- League: National 3 Group J
- 2022–23: National 3 Group M, 2nd
- Website: https://gfa74.footeo.com
Home colours	Away colours

GFA Rumilly-Vallières is a football club based in Rumilly in the Auvergne-Rhône-Alpes region of France. The club currently plays in Championnat National 3, the fifth tier of the French football league system.

== History ==
The club was formed in 1932 as Club Sportif Rumillien. Matches were played in Place d'Armes, the public square, with players showering in the public fountain.

In 1942 Club Sport Rumillien merged with the rugby club Football Club Rumilly, with the new entity being named Football Club Sportif de Rumilly. The new club was officially recognised on 25 May 1945.

The club was relegated to the district level of football in 1953 and remained at that level until three consecutive promotions between 1961 and 1963 returned them to the Division d'Honneur. During this period the current ground, Stade des Grangettes, was inaugurated in 1956. The club was relegated back to the district level in 1967 after three consecutive relegations and climbed back to the Division d'Honneur again by 1975.

Relegations from Division d'Honneur happened in 1979 and 1984, with promotions back to that level in 1981 and 1988. In 1989 the club were champions of the Division d'Honneur and entered Division 4. In their second season at that level they gained promotion to Division 3 for the 1991–92 season.

The club was relegated in its first season at Division 3, then in 1993, following reorganisation of the amateur championships, it was placed in Championnat National 3, level 5 of the national pyramid. It won promotion, at the first attempt, to Championnat National 2, but was relegated after one season. The club remained at the fifth tier (now named Championnat de France Amateur 2) until 2001, when it was relegated back to Division d'Honneur. It had a further spell at the fifth tier from 2003 to 2005. Three relegations in six years saw the club play at Promotion d'Honneur Régionale, level 8, in 2010.

In 2018, after climbing up through the regional leagues, the club gained promotion to Championnat National 3. In June of that year, it merged with Entente Sportif Vallières from the neighbouring town to take its current name.

In May 2020, with the French football season truncated by the COVID-19 pandemic, the club was promoted to Championnat National 2 due to specific tie-break rules introduced to resolve league positions after the incompleted season.

On 20 April 2021, Rumilly-Vallières beat Ligue 2 side Toulouse to reach the semi-finals of the Coupe de France, a first in their history. The 2–0 victory over TFC was described as the "greatest feat" in Rumilly-Vallières's history by L'Équipe. They exited the competition after a 5–1 defeat to Ligue 1 side Monaco in the semi-finals..

At the end of the 2021–22 season, the club was relegated back to the fifth tier after finishing in 15th place in its group.

== Honours ==
- Championnat National 3, Auvergne-Rhône-Alpes: 2019
- Division d'Honneur, Rhône-Alpes: 1989
