= Nicolas Barthélémy =

French footballer (born 1990)

Personal information
- Date of birth: 7 September 1990 (age 36)
- Place of birth: Évreux, France
- Height: 1.73 m (5 ft 8 in)
- Position: Midfielder

Team information
- Current team: Stade Sottevillais Football

Youth career
- 2000–2011: Pacy Vallée-d'Eure

Senior career*
Years	Team	Apps	(Gls)
2011–2012	Pacy Vallée-d'Eure	32	(2)
2012–2015	Dieppe	64	(16)
2015–2019	Quevilly-Rouen	59	(11)
2016–2019	Quevilly-Rouen B	26	(2)
2019–2023	Rouen	51	(10)
2023–2024	Louhans-Cuiseaux	20	(0)
2024–2026	C'Chartres	0	(0)
- * Club domestic league appearances and goals as of 09:50, 15 June 2024 (UTC)

Nicolas Barthélémy (born 7 September 1990) is a French professional footballer who plays as a midfielder for Championnat National 3 club C'Chartres.

== Career ==
Barthélémy spent 16 years at Pacy Vallée-d'Eure, the same club his grandfather played for, before moving to Dieppe in 2015. On 9 June 2015, he joined Quevilly-Rouen after years of being scouted for the team by the manager Emmanuel da Costa. Barthélémy made his professional debut for Quevilly-Rouen in a 1–0 Coupe de la Ligue loss to Orléans on 8 August 2017. He made his Ligue 2 debut in a 1–0 victory over Orléans on 17 November 2017.

In May 2019, Berthélémy joined Rouen for the 2019–20 season. On 13 June 2024, he signed for C'Chartres. Pour la saison 2026-2027, il joue en R1 au Stade Sottevillais Football.
