= Mamadou Diatta =

Senegalese association football player

Personal information
- Date of birth: 5 April 2001 (age 25)
- Place of birth: Ziguinchor, Senegal
- Height: 1.88 m (6 ft 2 in)
- Position: Midfielder

Senior career*
Years	Team	Apps	(Gls)
2020–2021	Pau FC	5	(0)
- * Club domestic league appearances and goals as of 3 December 2020

Mamadou Diatta (born 5 April 2001) is a Senegalese professional footballer who plays as a midfielder.

== Career ==
On 6 August 2020, Diatta signed his first professional contract with Pau FC. He made his professional debut with Pau in 1–1 Ligue 2 tie with Rodez AF on 29 August 2020.
