= Saint-Mesmin, Aube =

Commune in Grand Est, France

Saint-Mesmin
- Commune
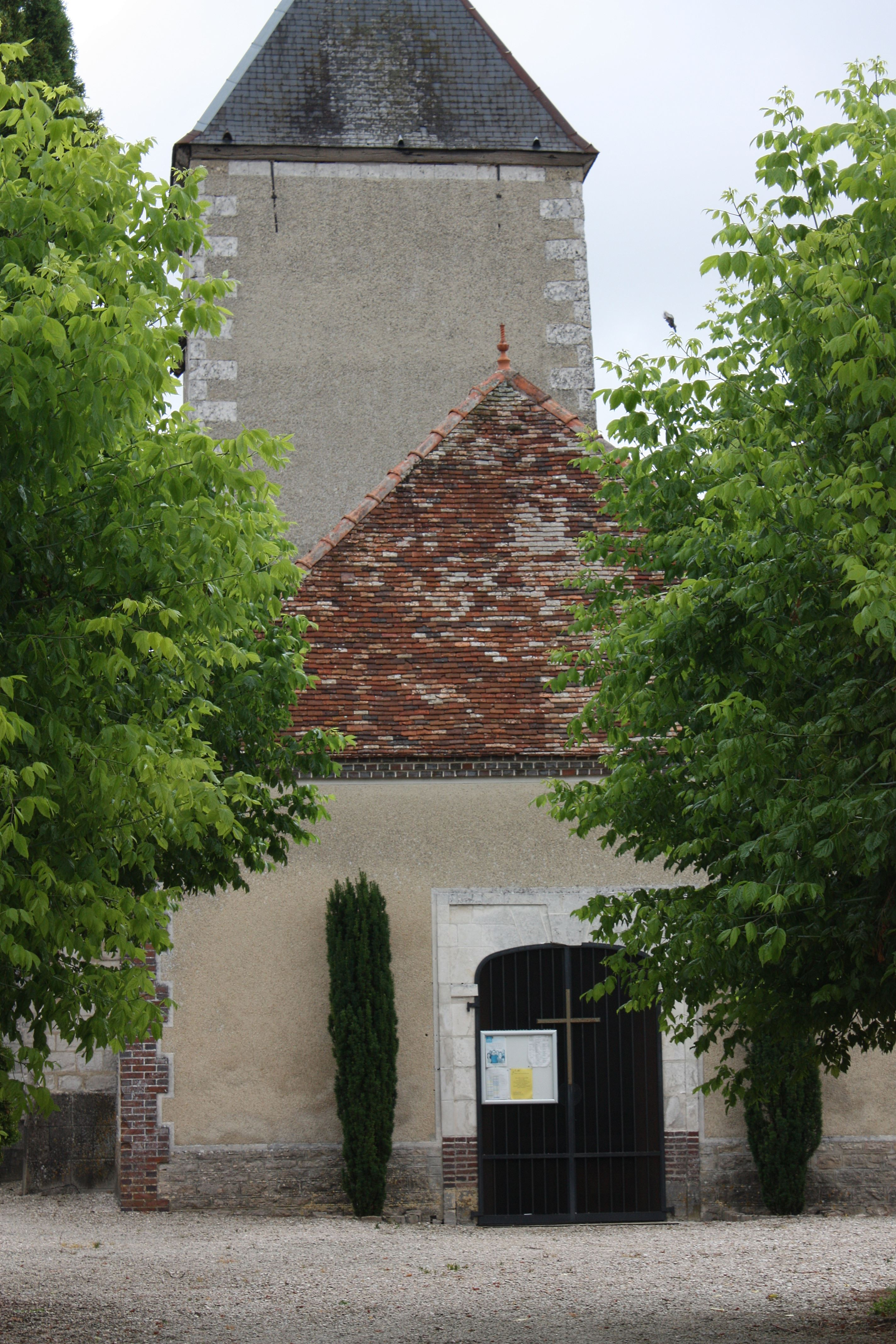
- The church in Saint-Mesmin

- Coat of arms
- Location of Saint-Mesmin
- Location within France Location within Grand Est
- Coordinates: 48°26′41″N 3°55′35″E
- Country: France
- Region: Grand Est
- Department: Aube
- Arrondissement: Nogent-sur-Seine
- Canton: Creney-près-Troyes

Government
  - Mayor (2022–2026): Patrice Masson
- Area^{1}: 16.15 km^{2} (6.24 sq mi)
- Elevation: 89 m (292 ft)
- Population (2023): 909
  - Density: 56.3/km^{2} (146/sq mi)
- Time zone: UTC+01:00 (CET)
  - Summer (DST): UTC+02:00 (CEST)
- INSEE/Postal code: 10353 /10280
- ^{1} French Land Register data, which excludes lakes, ponds, glaciers > 1 km^{2} (0.386 sq mi or 247 acres) and river estuaries.

Saint-Mesmin (French pronunciation: [sɛ̃ mɛmɛ̃]) is a commune in the Aube department in north-central France.

== Population ==
Historical population
Year	Pop.	±% p.a.
1968	679	—
1975	655	−0.51%
1982	919	+4.96%
1990	924	+0.07%
1999	839	−1.07%
2007	849	+0.15%
2012	879	+0.70%
2017	843	−0.83%
2023	909	+1.26%
Source: INSEE

== See also ==
- Communes of the Aube department
