= Ludovic Pancrate =

French footballer (born 1987)

Personal information
- Date of birth: 23 February 1987 (age 39)
- Place of birth: Schœlcher, Martinique
- Height: 1.85 m (6 ft 1 in)
- Position: Striker

Youth career
- CO Vincennes
- Le Mans UC
- 2005–2006: US Creteil

Senior career*
Years	Team	Apps	(Gls)
2006–2008	Créteil	30	(3)
2006–2007	Créteil II	22	(10)
2008–2010	UJA Alfortville	16	(2)
2010–2015	Entente SSG	100	(28)
2015–2016	Dinan-Léhon	13	(5)
2016–2017	Ivry	26	(8)
2017–2019	AG Caennaise		
2019	AS Excelsior	2	(0)
2019–2020	Créteil	16	(3)
2019–2020	Créteil II	2	(1)
2020	Versailles	7	(1)
2020–2021	Créteil	24	(3)

International career
2010	Martinique	1	(0)
- * Club domestic league appearances and goals as of 15 May 2021

Ludovic Pancrate (born 23 February 1987) is a French professional football player.

He played on the professional level in Ligue 2 for US Créteil-Lusitanos in the 2006–07 Ligue 2 season, making his debut for the club in the game against FC Gueugnon on 26 January 2007.

After three seasons with Créteil he joined UJA Alfortville for two seasons, and then spent five seasons with L'Entente SSG. He spent the first half of 2016 with Dinan-Léhon, signing for Ivry in August of the same year.

In 2019 he spent time with AS Excelsior in Réunion.

He signed for a second time with Créteil for the 2019–20 season, leaving for Versailles at the end of the season, but returning to Créteil for a third time after just three months.
