= 2020–21 USL Dunkerque season =

USL Dunkerque
2020–21 season
- Chairman: Jean-Pierre Scouarnec
- Manager: Fabien Mercadal
- Stadium: Stade Marcel-Tribut
- Ligue 2: 16th
- Coupe de France: Eighth round
- Top goalscorer: League: Malik Tchokounté (9); All: Malik Tchokounté (10)
Home colours	Away colours

The 2020–21 USL Dunkerque season was the club's 111th season in existence and its first season back in the second flight of French football. In addition to the domestic league, Dunkerque participated in this season's edition of the Coupe de France. The season covered the period from 1 July 2020 to 30 June 2021.

== Players ==
=== First-team squad ===
As of 5 September 2020.

Note: Flags indicate national team as defined under FIFA eligibility rules; some limited exceptions apply. Players may hold more than one non-FIFA nationality.

No.	Pos.	Nation	Player
1	GK	FRA	Jérémy Vachoux
2	DF	FRA	Emeric Dudouit
3	DF	FRA	Loïc Kouagba
5	DF	CMR	Jovanie Tchouatcha
6	DF	FRA	Jérémy Huysman
7	FW	FRA	Guillaume Bosca
8	MF	FRA	Thibault Vialla
9	FW	FRA	Kévin Rocheteau
10	MF	FRA	Dimitri Boudaud
11	FW	LAO	Billy Ketkeophomphone
12	DF	FRA	Ibrahim Cissé
15	DF	FRA	Alioune Ba
16	GK	FRA	Dorian Salhi
17	DF	FRA	Harouna Sy

No.	Pos.	Nation	Player
18	FW	FRA	Malik Tchokounté
19	MF	HAI	Leverton Pierre
20	MF	FRA	Ilan Kebbal (on loan from Reims)
21	MF	FRA	Nicolas Bruneel
22	MF	CGO	Randi Goteni
23	DF	FRA	David Kabamba
24	MF	FRA	Redouane Kerrouche
25	FW	GLP	Jorris Romil
27	DF	FRA	Adon Gomis
28	DF	FRA	Demba Thiam
29	DF	FRA	Thomas Vannoye
30	GK	FRA	Axel Maraval (captain)
34	MF	FRA	Ozkan Cetiner
40	GK	FRA	Marc-Antoine Guillaume

== Pre-season and friendlies ==
Win Draw Loss

18 July 2020 Friendly	Reims (France)	2–2	(France) Dunkerque	Le Touquet, France
17:00 CEST (UTC+2)	Sierhuis 11' (pen.); Zeneli 90' (pen.)		Bosca 55'; Bruneel 68'	Stadium: Stade Ferdi Petit

24 July 2020 Friendly	Dunkerque (France)	1–1	(France) Chambly	Loon-Plage, France
--:-- CEST (UTC+2)				Stadium: Stade Marcel Rosseel - Terrain 1

31 July 2020 Friendly	Dunkerque (France)	2–2	(France) US Quevilly-Rouen	Dinard, France
16:00 CEST (UTC+2)				Stadium: Stade d'athlétisme Cosec

4 August 2020 Friendly	Saint-Omer (France)	0–3	(France) Dunkerque	Saint-Omer, France
18:00 CEST (UTC+2)				Stadium: Stade Gaston Bonnet

15 August 2020 Friendly	Dunkerque (France)	3–1	(France) Boulogne	Dunkirk, France
19:00 CEST (UTC+2)				Stadium: Stade Marcel-Tribut

4 September 2020 Friendly	Cercle Brugge (Belgium)	1–1	(France) Dunkerque	Bruges, Belgium
13:00 CEST (UTC+2)	Hotić 89' (pen.)		Vialla 84'	Stadium: Jan Breydel Stadium; Attendance: 0

13 November 2020 Friendly	Oostende (Belgium)	2–1	(France) Dunkerque	Ostend, Belgium
11:00 CET (UTC+1)				Stadium: Diaz Arena

== Competitions ==
=== Overview ===
Competition	First match	Last match	Starting round	Final position	Record							
Competition	First match	Last match	Starting round	Final position	Pld	W	D	L	GF	GA	GD	Win %
Ligue 2	22 August 2020	15 May 2021	Matchday 1	16th	38	10	11	17	34	47	−13	26.32
Coupe de France	19 January 2021		Eighth round	Eighth round	1	0	1	0	1	1	+0	0.00
Total					39	10	12	17	35	48	−13	25.64

Source: Soccerway

=== Ligue 2 ===
==== League table ====
Pos	Team	Pld	W	D	L	GF	GA	GD	Pts	Promotion or Relegation
14	Pau	38	11	11	16	42	49	−7	44	
15	Rodez	38	8	19	11	38	44	−6	43	
16	Dunkerque	38	10	11	17	34	47	−13	41	
17	Caen	38	9	14	15	34	49	−15	41	
18	Niort (O)	38	9	14	15	34	58	−24	41	Qualification for the relegation play-offs

Source: Ligue 2
Rules for classification: 1) Points; 2) Goal difference; 3) Number of goals scored; 4) Head-to-head goal difference; 5) Fair play points
(O) Play-off winners

==== Results summary ====
Overall								Home						Away					
Pld	W	D	L	GF	GA	GD	Pts	W	D	L	GF	GA	GD	W	D	L	GF	GA	GD
38	10	11	17	34	47	−13	41	6	8	5	22	18	+4	4	3	12	12	29	−17

Source: Ligue 2

==== Results by round ====
Round	1	2	3	4	5	6	7	8	9	10	11	12	13	14	15	16	17	18	19	20	21	22	23	24	25	26	27	28	29	30	31	32	33	34	35	36	37	38
Ground	A	H	A	H	A	H	A	H	A	H	A	H	A	H	A	H	H	A	H	A	H	A	H	A	H	A	H	A	H	A	H	A	H	A	A	H	A	H
Result	W	D	L	W	L	W	L	L	W	L	W	D	L	W	L	L	L	L	D	L	W	L	D	D	L	D	D	L	W	L	D	W	D	D	L	W	L	D
Position	6	4	10	6	10	7	10	13	10	12	9	9	11	9	11	12	12	14	14	15	14	14	14	15	16	16	16	16	16	17	17	17	17	18	17	16	17	16

Source: Ligue 2
A = Away; H = Home; W = Win; D = Draw; L = Loss

==== Matches ====
The league fixtures were announced on 9 July 2020.

22 August 2020 1	Toulouse	0–1	Dunkerque	Toulouse
15:00 CEST (UTC+2)	Koné (yellow card) 51'	Report	Pierre (yellow card) 31'; Bruneel 55'	Stadium: Stadium de Toulouse; Referee: Aurélien Petit

29 August 2020 2	Dunkerque	1–1	Clermont	Dunkirk
19:00 CEST (UTC+2)	Ketkeophomphone 39'	Report	Magnin 53'	Stadium: Stade Marcel-Tribut; Referee: Mathieu Vernice

19 September 2020 4	Dunkerque	1–0	Valenciennes	Dunkirk
19:00 CEST (UTC+2)	Gomis 75'	Report		Stadium: Stade Marcel-Tribut; Attendance: 1,394; Referee: Bartolomeu Varela

26 September 2020 5	Rodez	2–1	Dunkerque	Rodez
19:00 CEST (UTC+2)	Dembélé 21'; Bonnet 82'	Report	Ketkeophomphone 50' (pen.)	Stadium: Stade Paul-Lignon; Attendance: 1,696; Referee: Remi Landry

30 September 2020 3	Ajaccio	1–0	Dunkerque	Ajaccio
19:00 CEST (UTC+2)	Barreto 73' (pen.)	Report		Stadium: Stade François Coty; Referee: Benjamin Lepaysant
Note: Match originally scheduled for 12 September, but postponed due to detection of a COVID-19 case.

3 October 2020 6	Dunkerque	1–0	Guingamp	Dunkirk
19:00 CEST (UTC+2)	Sy (yellow card) 5'; Romil 63'	Report	Rebocho (yellow card) 2'; Niakaté (yellow card) 29'	Stadium: Stade Marcel-Tribut; Referee: Abdelatif Kherradji

17 October 2020 7	Nancy	2–1	Dunkerque	Tomblaine
19:00 CEST (UTC+2)	Haag (yellow card) 20', (goal) 31'; Bassi 43'; Cissokho (yellow card) 90'	Report	Pierre (yellow card) 28'; Diarra 73'	Stadium: Stade Marcel Picot; Referee: Sylvain Palhies

24 October 2020 8	Dunkerque	0–1	Le Havre	Dunkirk
19:00 CEST (UTC+2)	Goteni (yellow card) 40'; Kebbal (yellow card) 70'	Report	Bazile 26'; Basque (yellow card) 70'; Lekhal (yellow card) 74'	Stadium: Stade Marcel-Tribut; Referee: Romain Lissorgue

31 October 2020 9	Chambly	0–1	Dunkerque	Beauvais
20:00 CET (UTC+1)	Stojanovski (yellow card) 21'; Beaulieu (yellow card) 43'; Soubervie (yellow card) 59'; Derrien (yellow card) 67'	Report	Goteni (yellow card) 16'; Dudouit (yellow card) 26', (goal) 58' (pen.); Sy (yellow card) 42'; Kerrouche (yellow card) 45+1'	Stadium: Stade Pierre Brisson; Referee: Bartolomeu Varela

7 November 2020 10	Dunkerque	0–1	Paris FC	Dunkirk
19:00 CET (UTC+1)	Pierre (yellow card) 19'	Report	Caddy 6'; Abdi (yellow card) 44' (yellow-red card) 90+4'	Stadium: Stade Marcel-Tribut; Referee: Pierre Gaillouste

21 November 2020 11	Niort	1–2	Dunkerque	Niort
19:00 CET (UTC+1)	Bâ 45+6', (yellow card) 88'; Boutobba (yellow card) 72'	Report	Diarra 1'; Kebbal 14'; Kerrouche (yellow card) 73'	Stadium: Stade René Gaillard; Referee: Bastien Dechepy

28 November 2020 12	Dunkerque	2–2	Pau	Dunkirk
19:00 CET (UTC+1)	Tchokounté 7'; Diarra 31'	Report	Armand 24', (yellow card) 90+4'; Scaramozzino (yellow card) 87'; Bayard 90'	Stadium: Stade Marcel-Tribut; Referee: Alexandre Perreau Niel

1 December 2020 13	Amiens SC	1–0	Dunkerque	Amiens
19:00 CET (UTC+1)	Odey 13'; Gomis (yellow card) 70'; Blin (yellow card) 73'	Report	Dudouit (yellow card) 23'; Kebbal (yellow card) 34'; Kouagba (yellow card) 67'; Sy (yellow card) 82'	Stadium: Stade de la Licorne; Referee: Arnaud Baert

5 December 2020 14	Dunkerque	2–0	Châteauroux	Dunkirk
19:00 CET (UTC+1)	Diarra 44', 55'; Tchokounté (yellow card) 45+2'; Maraval (yellow card) 72'	Report	Cordoval (yellow card) 19'; Mulumba (yellow card) 69'; M'Boné (yellow card) 90'	Stadium: Stade Marcel-Tribut; Referee: Nicolas Rainville

12 December 2020 15	Grenoble	4–0	Dunkerque	Grenoble
19:00 CET (UTC+1)	Semedo 43'; Djitté 51'; Nestor 70'; Tapoko (yellow card) 87'; Anani 90+1' (yellow card) 90+3'	Report	Pierre (yellow card) 64'; Kerrouche (yellow card) 65'	Stadium: Stade des Alpes; Referee: Alessandro Dudic

18 December 2020 16	Dunkerque	2–3	Caen	Dunkirk
20:00 (CET) (UTC+1)	Kebbal 16'; Dudouit (yellow card) 46'; Kerrouche (yellow card) 71'; Bosca 89'; Huysman (yellow card) 90+4'	Report	Court 17'; Beka Beka (yellow card) 36'; Gioacchini 45'; Yago (yellow card) 57'; Nsona 74'; Jeannot (penalty missed) 90+2'	Stadium: Stade Marcel-Tribut; Referee: Romain Lissorgue

22 December 2020 17	Dunkerque	0–1	Auxerre	Dunkirk
20:00 CET (UTC+1)	Huysman (yellow card) 17'; Dudouit (yellow card) 34'	Report	Dugimont 58'; Hein (yellow card) 86'	Stadium: Stade Marcel-Tribut; Referee: Yohann Larhant

5 January 2021 18	Sochaux	1–0	Dunkerque	Montbéliard
20:00 CET (UTC+1)	Lasme (yellow card) 25'; Lopy (yellow card) 58'; Weissbeck 63'	Report	Thiam (yellow card) 41'; Kerrouche (yellow card) 45+3'; Dudouit (yellow card) 84'	Stadium: Stade Auguste Bonal; Referee: Mathieu Vernice

8 January 2021 19	Dunkerque	0–0	Troyes	Dunkirk
20:00 CET (UTC+1)	Kerrouche (yellow card) 46'; Tchokounté (yellow card) 56'; A. Gomis (yellow card) 74'; Huysman (yellow card) 89'	Report	Raveloson (yellow card) 35'	Stadium: Stade Marcel-Tribut; Referee: Alexandre Perreau Niel

16 January 2021 20	Clermont	5–0	Dunkerque	Clermont-Ferrand
19:00 CET (UTC+1)	Dossou 28'; Allevinah 45'; Bayo 46', 56', 59'; Hountondji (yellow card) 68'	Report		Stadium: Stade Gabriel Montpied; Referee: Benjamin Lepaysant

23 January 2021 21	Dunkerque	3–1	Ajaccio	Dunkirk
19:00 CET (UTC+1)	Tchokounté 26', 87'; Romil 35'; Maraval (yellow card) 81'; Kerrouche (yellow card) 82'	Report	Coutadeur (yellow card) 3'; Bayala 46'; Leroy (red card) 51'	Stadium: Stade Marcel-Tribut; Referee: Guillaume Paradis

30 January 2021 22	Valenciennes	1–0	Dunkerque	Valenciennes
19:00 CET (UTC+1)	Cabral 28'; Cuffaut (yellow card) 39'; Kankava (yellow card) 89'	Report	Bâ (yellow card) 53'; Kerrouche (yellow card) 69'; Ketkeophomphone (yellow card) 78'	Stadium: Stade du Hainaut; Referee: Mathieu Vernice

2 February 2021 23	Dunkerque	0–0	Rodez	Dunkirk
20:00 CET (UTC+1)		Report	Roche (yellow card) 28'; Dembélé (yellow card) 38'; Mpasi-Nzau (yellow card) 45'; David (yellow card) 77'; Poujol (yellow card) 88'	Stadium: Stade Marcel-Tribut; Referee: Romain Delpech

5 February 2021 24	Guingamp	0–0	Dunkerque	Guingamp
20:00 CET (UTC+1)	Palun (yellow card) 29'; M'Changama (yellow card) 54'	Report	Bâ (yellow card) 39'; Thiam (yellow card) 68'; Dudouit (red card) 75'; Kebbal (yellow card) 85'; Maraval (yellow card) 90+2'	Stadium: Stade de Roudourou; Referee: Alexandre Perreau Niel

13 February 2021 25	Dunkerque	1–2	Nancy	Dunkirk
19:00 CET (UTC+1)	Tchokounté 24'; Diarra (yellow card) 68'	Report	Latouchent (yellow card) 31'; Biron 54', 75'; Seka (yellow card) 82'; Wooh (yellow card) 90+3'	Stadium: Stade Marcel-Tribut; Referee: Arnaud Baert

20 February 2021 26	Le Havre	1–1	Dunkerque	Le Havre
19:00 CET (UTC+1)	Bonnet 83' (pen.)	Report	Cissé (yellow card) 28'; Vialla (yellow card) 45+1'; Tchokounté 46'; Huysman (yellow card) 80'	Stadium: Stade Océane; Referee: Remi Landry

27 February 2021 27	Dunkerque	1–1	Chambly	Dunkirk
19:00 CET (UTC+1)	Diarra 52'	Report	Callegari (yellow card) 30'; Dequaire 62'; Correa (yellow card) 81'	Stadium: Stade Marcel-Tribut; Referee: Pierre Gaillouste

2 March 2021 28	Paris FC	1–0	Dunkerque	Paris
20:00 CET (UTC+1)	Belaud (yellow card) 20'; Boli (yellow card) 45+2'; Laura (yellow card) 66'; Abdi 90+2'	Report	Sy (yellow card) 28'; Kebbal (yellow card) 50'	Stadium: Stade Sébastien Charléty; Referee: Karim Abed

13 March 2021 29	Dunkerque	2–0	Niort	Dunkirk
20:00 CET (UTC+1)	Kerrouche (yellow card) 24'; Tchokounté 58'; Ketkeophomphone (yellow card) 61'; Pierre 85'	Report	Doukansy (yellow card) 43'; Vallier (yellow card) 73'; Conté (red card) 78'	Stadium: Stade Marcel-Tribut; Referee: Olivier Thual

20 March 2021 30	Pau	3–1	Dunkerque	Pau
20:00 CET (UTC+1)	Lobry 49' (pen.); Ketkeophomphone 76' (o.g.); Batisse 83'	Report	Kerrouche (yellow card) 31'; Ketkeophomphone 90'	Stadium: Stade du Hameau; Referee: Bartolomeu Varela Teles

10 April 2021 32	Châteauroux	1–2	Dunkerque	Châteauroux
20:00 CET (UTC+1)	Sanganté (yellow card) 20'; Grange 24'	Report	Huysman 7'; Tchokounté 50'; Diarra (yellow card) 69'	Stadium: Stade Gaston Petit; Referee: Benjamin Lepaysant

17 April 2021 33	Dunkerque	1–1	Grenoble	Dunkirk
20:00 CEST (UTC+2)	Cissé (yellow card) 30'; Huysman 33'; Boudaud (yellow card) 65'	Report	Anani 26'; Diallo (yellow card) 34' (yellow-red card) 55'; Mombris (red card) 56'	Stadium: Stade Marcel-Tribut; Referee: Syvain Palhies

20 April 2021 34	Caen	1–1	Dunkerque	Caen
20:00 CEST (UTC+2)	Deminguet 20', (yellow card) 66'; Court (yellow card) 46'; Yago (yellow card) 60'; Riou (red card) 88'	Report	Bosca (yellow card) 63'; Dudouit 88' (pen.)	Stadium: Stade Michel d'Ornano; Referee: Olivier Thual

24 April 2021 35	Auxerre	2–1	Dunkerque	Auxerre
20:00 CEST (UTC+2)	Touré (yellow card) 45+1' (yellow-red card) 84'; Le Bihan 33', 55'	Report	Tchokounté 2'; A. Gomis (yellow card) 53'; Boudaud (yellow card) 62'; Ba (yellow card) 89'	Stadium: Stade de l'Abbé-Deschamps; Referee: Guillaume Paradis

28 April 2021 31	Dunkerque	1–1	Amiens	Dunkirk
19:00 CET (UTC+1)	Dudouit (yellow card) 30'; Kebbal 47'	Report	Papeau 23'	Stadium: Stade Marcel-Tribut; Referee: Mathieu Vernice
Note: Re-schedule of match postponed from 3 April due to covid positives among the Amiens roster.

1 May 2021 36	Dunkerque	1–0	Sochaux	Dunkirk
20:00 CET (UTC+1)	Dudouit (yellow card) 10'; Bosca 84'	Report	Bedia (penalty missed) 18'; Weissbeck (yellow card) 37'; Ndour (red card) 68'; Thioune (yellow card) 90+2'	Stadium: Stade Marcel-Tribut; Referee: Alexandre Perreau Niel

8 May 2021 37	Troyes	2–0	Dunkerque	Troyes
20:00 CEST (UTC+2)	Saint-Louis (yellow card) 24', (goal) 70'; Tardieu (penalty missed) 45'; Gory 59'; Suk (yellow card) 79'	Report	Diarra (yellow card) 90'	Stadium: Stade de l'Aube; Referee: Nicolas Rainville

15 May 2021 38	Dunkerque	3–3	Toulouse	Dunkirk
20:00 CEST (UTC+2)	Dudouit 33' (pen.); Boudaud 49'; Tchokounté 73'; Maraval (yellow card) 78'	Report	Healey 27', 79' (pen.), 87'; Sanna (yellow card) 32'; Mvoué (red card) 68'	Stadium: Stade Marcel-Tribut; Referee: Johan Hamel

=== Coupe de France ===
19 January 2021 Eighth round	Dunkerque	1–1 (2–4 p)	Amiens	Dunkirk
18:00 CET (UTC+1)	Tchokounté 81'	Report	Blin 43'	Stadium: Stade Marcel Tribut; Referee: Sylvain Palhies
	Penalties
	Romil (penalty scored); Dudouit (penalty scored); Bosca (penalty missed); Tchokounté (penalty missed)		(penalty missed) Lomotey; (penalty scored) Sangaré; (penalty scored) Ciss; (penalty scored) Bianchini; (penalty scored) Akolo
