= 2021–22 USL Dunkerque season =

USL Dunkerque
2021–22 season
- Chairman: Jean-Pierre Scouarnec
- Manager: Romain Revelli
- Stadium: Stade Marcel-Tribut
- Ligue 2: 19th (relegated)
- Coupe de France: Seventh round
- Top goalscorer: League: Malik Tchokounté (9); All: Malik Tchokounté (9)
Home colours	Away colours	Third colours

The 2021–22 season was the 113th season in the existence of USL Dunkerque and the club's second consecutive season in the second division of French football. In addition to the domestic league, Dunkerque participated in this season's edition of the Coupe de France.

== Players ==
=== First-team squad ===
As of 31 January 2022

Note: Flags indicate national team as defined under FIFA eligibility rules; some limited exceptions apply. Players may hold more than one non-FIFA nationality.

No.	Pos.	Nation	Player
1	GK	FRA	Jérémy Vachoux
2	DF	FRA	Emeric Dudouit
4	DF	FRA	Thomas Vannoye
6	DF	FRA	Jérémy Huysman
8	MF	FRA	Redouane Kerrouche
9	FW	FRA	Kévin Rocheteau
10	MF	FRA	Dimitri Boudaud
11	MF	FRA	Iron Gomis (on loan from Amiens)
12	FW	FRA	Mohamed Ouadah
15	DF	FRA	Alioune Ba
16	GK	FRA	Dorian Salhi
17	MF	FRA	Bilal Brahimi
18	FW	FRA	Malik Tchokounté
19	MF	HAI	Leverton Pierre

No.	Pos.	Nation	Player
20	MF	FRA	Mario-Jason Kikonda
21	MF	FRA	Nicolas Bruneel
22	DF	FRA	Driss Trichard
23	DF	FRA	David Kabamba
24	FW	FRA	Marco Majouga
25	DF	CIV	Samuel Yohou
26	FW	MLI	Adama Niane (on loan from Sochaux)
27	DF	FRA	Adon Gomis
28	DF	FRA	Demba Thiam
29	FW	FRA	Adam Abeddou
30	GK	FRA	Axel Maraval (captain)
34	FW	FRA	Manuel Semedo
34	FW	FRA	Amine Salama
37	DF	FRA	Théo Loridan

=== Out on loan ===
Note: Flags indicate national team as defined under FIFA eligibility rules; some limited exceptions apply. Players may hold more than one non-FIFA nationality.

No.	Pos.	Nation	Player
—	FW	BEN	Désiré Segbé Azankpo (at Dinamo București)

== Pre-season and friendlies ==
Win Draw Loss

26 June 2021 Friendly	Dunkerque (France)	1–1	(Belgium) Cercle Brugge	Dunkirk, France
18:00 CEST (UTC+2)				Stadium: Stade Marcel-Tribut

2 July 2021 Friendly	Valenciennes (France)	0–0	(France) Dunkerque	Cambrai, France
17:00 CEST (UTC+2)				Stadium: Stade de la Liberté

2 September 2021 Friendly	Lens (France)	3–4	(France) Dunkerque	Avion, France
--:-- CEST (UTC+2)		Report		Stadium: La Gaillette; Attendance: 0

== Competitions ==
=== Overall record ===
Competition	First match	Last match	Starting round	Final position	Record							
Competition	First match	Last match	Starting round	Final position	Pld	W	D	L	GF	GA	GD	Win %
Ligue 2	24 July 2021	14 May 2022	Matchday 1	19th	38	8	7	23	28	53	−25	21.05
Coupe de France	13 November 2021		Seventh round	Seventh round	1	0	0	1	0	1	−1	0.00
Total					39	8	7	24	28	54	−26	20.51

Source: Soccerway

=== Ligue 2 ===
==== League table ====
Pos	Team	Pld	W	D	L	GF	GA	GD	Pts	Promotion or Relegation
16	Valenciennes	38	10	14	14	34	47	−13	44	
17	Rodez	38	10	13	15	32	42	−10	43	
18	Quevilly-Rouen (O)	38	10	10	18	33	50	−17	40	Qualification for the relegation play-offs
19	Dunkerque (R)	38	8	7	23	28	53	−25	31	Relegation to Championnat National
20	Nancy (R)	38	6	9	23	32	69	−37	27	Relegation to Championnat National

Source: Ligue 2
Rules for classification: 1) Points; 2) Goal difference; 3) Number of goals scored; 4) Head-to-head goal difference; 5) Fair play points
(O) Play-off winners; (R) Relegated

==== Results summary ====
Overall								Home						Away					
Pld	W	D	L	GF	GA	GD	Pts	W	D	L	GF	GA	GD	W	D	L	GF	GA	GD
38	8	7	23	28	53	−25	31	5	6	8	14	21	−7	3	1	15	14	32	−18

Source: Ligue 2

==== Results by round ====
Round	1	2	3	4	5	6	7	8	9	10	11	12	13	14	15	16	17	18	19	20	21	22	23	24	25	26	27	28	29	30	31	32	33	34	35	36	37	38
Ground	H	A	H	A	H	A	H	A	H	A	H	A	H	H	A	H	A	H	A	H	A	H	A	H	A	H	A	H	A	H	A	A	H	A	H	A	H	A
Result	D	L	L	L	L	D	D	L	L	W	W	W	D	W	L	L	L	L	L	D	L	D	W	W	L	W	L	W	L	L	L	L	L	L	D	L	L	L
Position	11	15	16	17	18	19	19	19	19	19	19	17	17	13	15	18	19	19	19	19	19	19	19	19	19	18	19	17	19	19	19	19	19	19	19	19	19	19

Source: Ligue 2
A = Away; H = Home; W = Win; D = Draw; L = Loss

==== Matches ====
The league fixtures were announced on 25 June 2021.

24 July 2021 1	Dunkerque	1–1	Quevilly-Rouen	Dunkerque
19:00 CEST (UTC+2)	Sy (yellow card) 5'; Ouadah (yellow card) 19'; A. Gomis 31'; Dudouit (yellow card) 61'	Report	Haddad 7' (pen.); Bahassa (yellow card) 78'	Stadium: Stade Marcel-Tribut; Referee: Olivier Thual

31 July 2021 2	Paris FC	2–1	Dunkerque	Paris
19:00 CEST (UTC+2)	Guilavogui 11'; Gakpa 61'	Report	Tchokounté 35'; Huysman (yellow card) 65'	Stadium: Stade Sébastien Charléty; Referee: Guillaume Paradis

7 August 2021 3	Dunkerque	1–2	Quevilly-Rouen	Dunkerque
19:00 CEST (UTC+2)	Pierre 16'; Dudouit (yellow card) 37'	Report	Cassubie 19'; Mendes 90+4'	Stadium: Stade Marcel-Tribut; Referee: Benjamin Lepaysant

14 August 2021 4	Sochaux	1–0	Dunkerque	Montbéliard
19:00 CEST (UTC+2)	Kalulu (yellow card) 37'; Vannoye 43' (o.g.); Henry (yellow card) 90+7'	Report	Brahimi (yellow card) 20'; Maraval (yellow card) 37'; Dudouit (yellow card) 47'	Stadium: Stade Auguste Bonal; Referee: Bartolomeu Varela

21 August 2021 5	Dunkerque	0–2	Nîmes	Dunkerque
19:00 CEST (UTC+2)	Ouadah (yellow card) 47'	Report	Cubas (yellow card) 37'; Burner (yellow card) 55'; Benrahou 70'; Eliasson 90+4'	Stadium: Stade Marcel-Tribut; Referee: Alexandre Perreau Niel

28 August 2021 6	Rodez	2–2	Dunkerque	Rodez
19:00 CET (UTC+1)	Célestine (yellow card) 19'; Dépres 58', (yellow card) 90+2'; Buadés 80'	Report	Tchokounté (yellow card) 19'; Bruneel 23', (yellow card) 52'; Rocheteau 66'; Maraval (yellow card) 90+2'	Stadium: Stade Paul-Lignon; Referee: Pierre Legat

11 September 2021 7	Dunkerque	0–0	Nancy	Dunkerque
19:00 CEST (UTC+2)	Vannoye (yellow card) 45+3'; Ba (yellow card) 61'; Kerrouche (yellow card) 84'	Report	Dewaele (yellow card) 18'; Haag (red card) 34'; Bondo (yellow card) 86'	Stadium: Stade Marcel-Tribut; Referee: Benjamin Lepaysant

18 September 2021 8	Dijon	2–0	Dunkerque	Dijon
19:00 CEST (UTC+2)	Traoré (yellow card) 38'; Rocchia (yellow card) 44'; Le Bihan 55'; Coulibaly 86'	Report	Ba (yellow card) 45'; Brahimi (yellow card) 69'; A. Gomis (yellow card) 84'	Stadium: Stade Gaston Gérard; Referee: Aurelien Petit

21 September 2021 9	Dunkerque	0–2	Toulouse	Dunkerque
20:00 CEST (UTC+2)	Ba (yellow card) 27'; Bruneel (yellow card) 54'	Report	Desler 30'; Nicolaisen (yellow card) 40'; Sylla (yellow card) 61'; Evitt-Healey 67'	Stadium: Stade Marcel-Tribut; Referee: Abdelatif Kherradji

24 September 2021 10	Pau	1–2	Dunkerque	Pau
19:00 CEST (UTC+2)	Batisse (yellow card) 45+3' (yellow-red card) 72'; Koffi (yellow card) 53'; Essende 67'; Dianessy (red card) 90+9'	Report	Ba (yellow card) 29' (red card) 31'; Vachoux (yellow card) 33'; Tchokounté 40'; Rocheteau (yellow card) 48'; Kerrouche (yellow card) 68'; Vannoye (red card) 90+9'	Stadium: Nouste Camp; Referee: Mathieu Vernice

2 October 2021 11	Dunkerque	2–0	Bastia	Dunkerque
19:00 CEST (UTC+2)	Tchokounté (yellow card) 33', (goal) 58', 86'	Report	Quemper (yellow card) 21'	Stadium: Stade Marcel-Tribut; Referee: Remi Landry

16 October 2021 12	Valenciennes	1–3	Dunkerque	Valenciennes
20:00 CEST (UTC+2)	Ntim (yellow card) 2'; Yatabaré (yellow card) 27'; Hamache 54'; Kaba (yellow card) 74'	Report	Rocheteau 3' (pen.), 47'; Dudouit (yellow card) 7'; Azankpo 41'; Kikonda (yellow card) 45+1'; Kerrouche (yellow card) 74'; Pierre (yellow card) 78'	Stadium: Stade du Hainaut; Referee: Benjamin Lepaysant

23 October 2021 13	Dunkerque	1–1	Caen	Dunkerque
19:00 CEST (UTC+2)	Tchokounté 85'	Report	Chahiri 62'	Stadium: Stade Marcel-Tribut; Attendance: 2,500; Referee: Aurélien Petit

30 October 2021 14	Dunkerque	1–0	Le Havre	Dunkerque
19:00 CEST (UTC+2)	A. Ba (yellow card) 40'; Brahimi 54'; Thiam (yellow card) 60'	Report	Boutaïb (yellow card) 40'; P. Bâ (yellow card) 57'	Stadium: Stade Marcel-Tribut; Referee: Pierre Legat

6 November 2021 15	Grenoble	1–0	Dunkerque	Grenoble
19:00 CEST (UTC+2)	Bambock (yellow card) 43'; Belmonte (yellow card) 49'; Nestor 90+3'; Kokhreidze (yellow card) 90+5'	Report	Kikonda (yellow card) 2' (yellow-red card) 44'	Stadium: Stade des Alpes; Referee: Frank Schneider

20 November 2021 16	Dunkerque	0–1	Ajaccio	Dunkerque
19:00 CEST (UTC+2)	Kikonda (yellow card) 54'; Bruneel (yellow card) 90+2'	Report	Cimignani 68'; Avinel (yellow card) 70'; Courtet (yellow card) 73'	Stadium: Stade Marcel-Tribut; Referee: Arnaud Baert

3 December 2021 17	Amiens	3–0	Dunkerque	Amiens
21:00 CET (UTC+1)	Badji 26', 90+2'; Pavlović (yellow card) 46'; Akolo 80'; Fofana (b. 1998) (yellow card) 83'	Report	Pierre (yellow card) 63'; Thiam (yellow card) 84'	Stadium: Stade de la Licorne; Referee: Benjamin Lepaysant

11 December 2021 18	Dunkerque	0–2	Auxerre	Dunkirk
19:00 CET (UTC+1)	Dudouit (yellow card) 42'	Report	Autret 54'; Sakhi 84'	Stadium: Stade Marcel-Tribut; Referee: Guillaume Paradis

21 December 2021 19	Guingamp	2–1	Dunkerque	Guingamp
19:00 CET (UTC+1)	Merghem (yellow card) 42'; Pierrot 49', 55'; Ba (yellow card) 61'	Report	Kikonda (yellow card) 45'; Tchokounté 52'; Thiam (yellow card) 70'	Stadium: Stade de Roudourou; Referee: Olivier Thual

22 January 2022 22	Dunkerque	0–0	Sochaux	Dunkirk
19:00 CET (UTC+1)	Yohou (yellow card) 37'; A. Gomis (yellow card) 53'; Dudouit (yellow card) 73'; Pierre (yellow card) 77'; Majouga (yellow card) 78'	Report	Weissbeck (yellow card) 18'	Stadium: Stade Marcel-Tribut; Referee: Arnaud Baert

28 January 2022 20	Dunkerque	1–1	Paris FC	Dunkirk
19:00 CET (UTC+1)	Yohou (yellow card) 29'; Kikonda (yellow card) 42'; Tchokounté 68' (pen.)	Report	Siby (yellow card) 45'; Iglesias 49'; Bamba (yellow card) 56'; Bernauer (yellow card) 67'	Stadium: Stade Marcel-Tribut; Referee: Nicolas Rainville

1 February 2022 21	Niort	2–0	Dunkerque	Niort
20:45 CET (UTC+1)	Boutobba 56'; Merdji 71'	Report	A. Gomis (yellow card) 35'	Stadium: Stade René Gaillard; Referee: Jérôme Miguelgorry

5 February 2022 23	Nîmes	0–1	Dunkerque	Nîmes
19:00 CET (UTC+1)	Delpech (yellow card) 28'; Koné (yellow card) 48'; Ómarsson (red card) 67'; Sarr (yellow card) 81'; Ponceau (yellow card) 90+1'	Report	Huysman (yellow card) 19'; Tchokounté (yellow card) 53'; Trichard (yellow card) 61'; Rocheteau 73'; I. Gomis (yellow card) 81'	Stadium: Stade des Costières; Referee: Benjamin Lepaysant

12 February 2022 24	Dunkerque	2–0	Rodez	Dunkirk
19:00 CET (UTC+1)	Rocheteau 21'; Trichard (yellow card) 28'; Dudouit 42'	Report	Kerouedan (yellow card) 27'; Buadés (yellow card) 43'	Stadium: Stade Marcel-Tribut; Referee: Hakim Ben El Hadj Salem

19 February 2022 25	Nancy	2–0	Dunkerque	Tomblaine
19:00 CET (UTC+1)	Basila 16'; M. Thiam (yellow card) 45+1', (goal) 62'	Report	D. Thiam (yellow card) 51'; Huysman (yellow card) 65'	Stadium: Stade Marcel Picot; Referee: Aurelien Petit

26 February 2022 26	Dunkerque	2–1	Dijon	Dunkirk
19:00 CET (UTC+1)	Niané 31'; Kikonda (yellow card) 53'; I. Gomis 64'	Report	Philippoteaux (yellow card) 19'; Dobre 51'; Le Bihan (yellow card) 80'	Stadium: Stade Marcel-Tribut; Referee: Abdelatif Kherradji

7 March 2022 27	Toulouse	2–0	Dunkerque	Toulouse
20:45 CET (UTC+1)	Van den Boomen 34'; Ratão 73'	Report	Thiam (red card) 64'; Niané (yellow card) 65'; Huysman (yellow card) 81'	Stadium: Stadium de Toulouse; Referee: Arnaud Baert

12 March 2022 28	Dunkerque	1–0	Pau	Dunkirk
19:00 CET (UTC+1)	Tchokounté 31'	Report	Koffi (yellow card) 45+1'; Lobry (yellow card) 55'; Daubin (yellow card) 64'; Naidji (yellow card) 90'; Batisse (yellow card) 90+4'	Stadium: Stade Marcel-Tribut; Referee: Bartolomeu Varela

15 March 2022 29	Bastia	1–0	Dunkerque	Furiani
20:00 CET (UTC+1)	Guidi (yellow card) 14'; Talal 21'; Palun (yellow card) 58'; Roncaglia (yellow card) 90+2'; Santelli (yellow card) 90+3'	Report	Ba (yellow card) 2'	Stadium: Stade Armand Cesari; Referee: Alexandre Perreau Niel

19 March 2022 30	Dunkerque	1–2	Valenciennes	Dunkirk
19:00 CET (UTC+1)	Niané 81'	Report	Linguet 9'; Boutoutaou 84'	Stadium: Stade Marcel-Tribut; Referee: Frank Schneider

2 April 2022 31	Caen	2–1	Dunkerque	Caen
19:00 CEST (UTC+2)	Court 36', (yellow card) 43'; Traoré (yellow card) 39'; Mendy 50'	Report	Brahimi (yellow card) 29'; Dudouit (yellow card) 51'; Tchokounté 71'	Stadium: Stade Michel d'Ornano; Referee: Willy Delajod

9 April 2022 32	Le Havre	2–1	Dunkerque	Le Havre
15:00 CEST (UTC+2)	Abdelli 19', (yellow card) 68', (goal) 89'; Sangante (yellow card) 41'; Lekhal (yellow card) 50'	Report	Ouadah (yellow card) 50'; Huysman (yellow card) 63'; Majouga 71'	Stadium: Stade Océane; Referee: Bartolomeu Varela

16 April 2022 33	Dunkerque	0–3	Grenoble	Dunkirk
19:00 CEST (UTC+2)		Report	Nestor 43'; Sanyang 45+1', 64'; Belmonte (yellow card) 82'	Stadium: Stade Marcel-Tribut; Referee: Mathieu Vernice

19 April 2022 34	Ajaccio	2–1	Dunkerque	Ajaccio
20:00 CEST (UTC+2)	Courtet 3'; Marchetti 17'	Report	Majouga 64'; Pierre (yellow card) 77'; Brahimi (yellow card) 90'	Stadium: Stade François Coty; Referee: Nicolas Rainville

22 April 2022 35	Dunkerque	0–0	Amiens	Dunkirk
21:00 CEST (UTC+2)	Majouga (yellow card) 57'	Report		Stadium: Stade Marcel-Tribut; Referee: Olivier Thual

30 April 2022 36	Auxerre	1–0	Dunkerque	Auxerre
15:00 CEST (UTC+2)	Pellenard (yellow card) 68'; Perrin (yellow card) 75', (goal) 88'	Report	Pierre (yellow card) 34'; Trichard (yellow card) 41'	Stadium: Stade de l'Abbé-Deschamps; Referee: Benjamin Lepaysant

7 May 2022 37	Dunkerque	1–3	Guingamp	Dunkirk
19:00 CEST (UTC+2)	Ba (yellow card) 45'; Niané 78'; Brahimi (yellow card) 80'	Report	Livolant 20'; M'Changama 27'; Pierrot 37'; Quemper (yellow card) 55'	Stadium: Stade Marcel-Tribut; Referee: Abdelatif Kherradji

14 May 2022 38	Quevilly-Rouen	3–1	Dunkerque	Le Petit-Quevilly
19:00 CEST (UTC+2)	Nazon 28'; Sabaly 70'; Jozefzoon 75'; Dekoke (yellow card) 90'	Report	Brahimi 15'; Pierre (yellow card) 81'	Stadium: Stade Robert Diochon; Referee: Olivier Thual

=== Coupe de France ===
13 November 2021 Seventh round	ESA Linas-Montlhéry	1–0	Dunkerque	Montlhéry
18:00 CET (UTC+1)	Bouvil 90'	Report		Stadium: Stade Paul Desgouillons; Referee: Anthony Ustaritz
