= 2021–22 Pau FC season =

Pau FC
2021–22 season
- un: Bernard Laporte-Fray
- Chairman: Bernard Laporte-Fray
- Head coach: Didier Tholot
- Stadium: Nouste Camp
- Ligue 2: 10th
- Coupe de France: Seventh round
| Home colours | Away colours |

The 2021–22 season was the 63rd season in the existence of Pau FC and the club's second consecutive season in the second division of French football. In addition to the domestic league, Pau participated in this season's edition of the Coupe de France.

== Players ==
=== First-team squad ===
Note: Flags indicate national team as defined under FIFA eligibility rules; some limited exceptions apply. Players may hold more than one non-FIFA nationality.

| No. | Pos. | Nation | Player |
|---|---|---|---|
| 1 | GK | FRA | Alexandre Olliero |
| 2 | FW | FRA | Jared Khasa (on loan from Sion) |
| 4 | MF | CIV | Xavier Kouassi |
| 5 | MF | SEN | Abdourahmane Ndiaye |
| 6 | MF | FRA | Quentin Daubin |
| 7 | DF | CIV | Erwin Koffi |
| 8 | DF | FRA | Mahamadou Dembélé (on loan from Troyes) |
| 9 | FW | FRA | Romain Armand |
| 10 | MF | SRB | Jovan Nišić |
| 11 | FW | FRA | Djibril Dianessy |
| 12 | FW | FRA | Eddy Sylvestre (on loan from Standard Liège) |
| 14 | DF | FRA | Kenji-Van Boto (on loan from Auxerre) |
| 15 | FW | ALG | Farid El Melali (on loan from Angers) |
| 16 | GK | SEN | Massamba Ndiaye |

| No. | Pos. | Nation | Player |
|---|---|---|---|
| 17 | DF | FRA | Antoine Batisse |
| 18 | FW | GHA | Ebenezer Assifuah |
| 19 | MF | FRA | Victor Lobry |
| 20 | DF | FRA | Louis Bury |
| 21 | MF | FRA | Steeve Beusnard |
| 22 | MF | FRA | Denis-Will Poha (on loan from Vitória) |
| 24 | MF | ALG | Zakaria Naidji (on loan from Paradou AC) |
| 25 | MF | FRA | Paul Meliande |
| 26 | DF | FRA | Jean Lambert Evans |
| 28 | FW | GBS | David Gomis |
| 29 | FW | FRA | Samuel Essende |
| 30 | GK | FRA | Benjamin Bertrand |
| 50 | GK | FRA | Stefan Bajic |

== Pre-season and friendlies ==
Win Draw Loss

| 3 September 2021 Friendly | Toulouse | 3–2 | Pau | Tarbes, France |
| 11:00 CEST (UTC+2) | | | | Stadium: Stade Maurice-Trélut |

== Competitions ==
=== Overall record ===
| Competition | First match | Last match | Starting round | Final position | Record | | | | | | | |
| Competition | First match | Last match | Starting round | Final position | Pld | W | D | L | GF | GA | GD | Win % |
|---|---|---|---|---|---|---|---|---|---|---|---|---|
| Ligue 2 | 24 July 2021 | 14 May 2022 | Matchday 1 | 10th | 38 | 14 | 7 | 17 | 41 | 49 | −8 | 36.84 |
| Coupe de France | 13 November 2021 | | Seventh round | Seventh round | 1 | 0 | 1 | 0 | 2 | 2 | +0 | 0.00 |
| Total | | | | | 39 | 14 | 8 | 17 | 43 | 51 | −8 | 35.90 |

Source: Soccerway

=== Ligue 2 ===
==== League table ====
| Pos | Team | Pld | W | D | L | GF | GA | GD | Pts |
|---|---|---|---|---|---|---|---|---|---|
| 8 | Le Havre | 38 | 13 | 11 | 14 | 38 | 41 | −3 | 50 |
| 9 | Nîmes | 38 | 14 | 7 | 17 | 44 | 51 | −7 | 49 |
| 10 | Pau | 38 | 14 | 7 | 17 | 41 | 49 | −8 | 49 |
| 11 | Dijon | 38 | 13 | 8 | 17 | 48 | 53 | −5 | 47 |
| 12 | Bastia | 38 | 10 | 16 | 12 | 38 | 36 | +2 | 46 |

Source: Ligue 2
Rules for classification: 1) Points; 2) Goal difference; 3) Number of goals scored; 4) Head-to-head goal difference; 5) Fair play points

==== Results summary ====
| Overall | | | | | | | | Home | | | | | | Away | | | | | |
| Pld | W | D | L | GF | GA | GD | Pts | W | D | L | GF | GA | GD | W | D | L | GF | GA | GD |
|---|---|---|---|---|---|---|---|---|---|---|---|---|---|---|---|---|---|---|---|
| 38 | 14 | 7 | 17 | 41 | 49 | −8 | 49 | 10 | 2 | 7 | 25 | 20 | +5 | 4 | 5 | 10 | 16 | 29 | −13 |

Source: Ligue 2

==== Results by round ====
| Round | 1 | 2 | 3 | 4 | 5 | 6 | 7 | 8 | 9 | 10 | 11 | 12 | 13 | 14 | 15 | 16 | 17 | 18 | 19 | 20 | 21 | 22 | 23 | 24 | 25 | 26 | 27 | 28 | 29 | 30 | 31 | 32 | 33 | 34 | 35 | 36 | 37 | 38 |
|---|---|---|---|---|---|---|---|---|---|---|---|---|---|---|---|---|---|---|---|---|---|---|---|---|---|---|---|---|---|---|---|---|---|---|---|---|---|---|
| Ground | H | A | H | A | H | H | A | H | A | H | A | H | A | H | A | H | A | H | A | H | A | H | A | A | H | A | H | A | H | A | H | A | H | A | H | A | H | A |
| Result | W | L | L | D | W | W | W | D | D | L | L | W | L | W | L | W | L | L | L | W | D | L | D | W | W | L | W | L | L | D | W | L | L | L | L | W | D | W |
| Position | 5 | 9 | 13 | 14 | 10 | 8 | 5 | 5 | 6 | 7 | 7 | 7 | 8 | 8 | 8 | 7 | 8 | 9 | 10 | 8 | 9 | 10 | 9 | 9 | 9 | 8 | 7 | 8 | 8 | 9 | 8 | 9 | 12 | 13 | 15 | 12 | 12 | 10 |

Source: Ligue 2
A = Away; H = Home; W = Win; D = Draw; L = Loss

==== Matches ====
The league fixtures were announced on 25 June 2021.

| 24 July 2021 1 | Pau | 2–1 | Nancy | Pau |
| 19:00 CEST (UTC+2) | Assifuah 34'; Dembélé (yellow card) 37'; Daubin (yellow card) 87'; Lobry 90+3' | Report | Haag (yellow card) 14' (yellow-red card) 40'; Thiam 55'; Lefebvre (yellow card) 88' | Stadium: Stade du Hameau; Referee: Marc Bollengier |

| 31 July 2021 2 | Rodez | 1–0 | Pau | Rodez |
| 19:00 CEST (UTC+2) | Leborgne (yellow card) 20' (yellow-red card) 52'; Buadés 45' | Report | Beusnard (yellow card) 55'; Batisse (yellow card) 70'; Kouassi (red card) 75' | Stadium: Stade Paul-Lignon; Referee: Remi Landry |

| 7 August 2021 3 | Pau | 0–1 | Toulouse | Pau |
| 19:00 CEST (UTC+2) | Dembélé (yellow card) 82' | Report | Dejaegere 7' van den Boomen (yellow card) 81' | Stadium: Nouste Camp; Referee: Aurélien Petit |

| 14 August 2021 4 | Nîmes | 0–0 | Pau | Nîmes |
| 19:00 CEST (UTC+2) | | Report | | Stadium: Stade des Costières; Referee: Mathieu Vernice |

| 21 August 2021 5 | Pau | 2–0 | Bastia | Pau |
| 19:00 CEST (UTC+2) | Koffi 38'; Assifuah 49'; Daubin (yellow card) 61'; Gomis (yellow card) 70' | Report | Schur (yellow card) 28'; Santelli (yellow card) 34'; Guidi (red card) 86' | Stadium: Nouste Camp; Referee: Arnaud Baert |

| 28 August 2021 6 | Pau | 2–0 | Dijon | Pau |
| 19:00 CEST (UTC+2) | Nišić (yellow card) 16'; Assifuah 45'; Essende 82' | Report | Ahlinvi (yellow card) 44' | Stadium: Nouste Camp; Referee: Abdelatif Kherradji |

| 11 September 2021 7 | Caen | 1–2 | Pau | Caen |
| 19:00 CEST (UTC+2) | Rivierez 23'; Zady Sery (yellow card) 31' | Report | Daubin (yellow card) 37'; Gomis 42'; Armand 59'; Evans (yellow card) 71'; Gomis (yellow card) 76' | Stadium: Stade Michel d'Ornano; Attendance: 8,867; Referee: Alexandre Perreau Niel |

| 18 September 2021 8 | Pau | 1–1 | Valenciennes | Pau |
| 19:00 CEST (UTC+2) | Assifuah 14', (yellow card) 65'; Boto (yellow card) 40'; Armand (yellow card) 59'; Beusnard 79' | Report | Yatabaré 24'; Doukouré (yellow card) 51'; Cuffaut (yellow card) 68' | Stadium: Nouste Camp; Referee: Jordane Lomi |

| 21 September 2021 9 | Amiens | 2–2 | Pau | Amiens |
| 20:00 CEST (UTC+2) | Pavlović 7'; Arokodare 76' | Report | Lobry 38' (pen.); Essende (yellow card) 48'; Batisse (yellow card) 89'; Dianessy 90' | Stadium: Stade de la Licorne; Referee: Marc Bollengier |

| 24 September 2021 10 | Pau | 1–2 | Dunkerque | Pau |
| 19:00 CEST (UTC+2) | Batisse (yellow card) 45+3' (yellow-red card) 72'; Koffi (yellow card) 53'; Essende 67'; Dianessy (red card) 90+9' | Report | Ba (yellow card) 29' (red card) 31'; Vachoux (yellow card) 33'; Tchokounté 40'; Rocheteau (yellow card) 48'; Kerrouche (yellow card) 68'; Vannoye (red card) 90+9' | Stadium: Nouste Camp; Referee: Mathieu Vernice |

| 2 October 2021 11 | Grenoble | 2–0 | Pau | Grenoble |
| 19:00 CEST (UTC+2) | Diallo 39'; Ravet 45+1' (pen.) | Report | Daubin (yellow card) 41'; Olliero (yellow card) 44' | Stadium: Stade des Alpes; Referee: Benjamin Lepaysant |

| 16 October 2021 12 | Pau | 1–0 | Paris FC | Pau |
| 19:00 CEST (UTC+2) | Lobry 37' | Report | | Stadium: Nouste Camp; Referee: Arnaud Baert |

| 23 October 2021 13 | Le Havre | 1–0 | Pau | Le Havre |
| 19:00 CEST (UTC+2) | Kouassi 16' (o.g.); Cornette (yellow card) 59' | Report | Boto (yellow card) 47'; Sylvestre (yellow card) 80' | Stadium: Stade Océane; Referee: Abdelatifa Kherradji |

| 30 October 2021 14 | Pau | 1–0 | Ajaccio | Pau |
| 19:00 CEST (UTC+2) | Sylvestre (yellow card) 44'; Kouassi (yellow card) 52'; Lobry 55' | Report | El Idrissy (yellow card) 39'; Coutadeur (yellow card) 74'; Courtet (yellow card) 75'; Gonzalez (yellow card) 81' | Stadium: Nouste Camp; Referee: Marc Bollengier |

| 6 November 2021 15 | Auxerre | 4–1 | Pau | Auxerre |
| 15:00 CET (UTC+1) | Perrin 8'; Hein (yellow card) 34'; Autret 73' (pen.); Bernard (yellow card) 74'; Mohamed 89'; Charbonnier 90+2' | Report | Kouassi (yellow card) 39'; Batisse (red card) 59'; Armand 67' | Stadium: Stade de l'Abbé-Deschamps; Referee: Guillaume Paradis |

| 20 November 2021 16 | Pau | 2–0 | Guingamp | Pau |
| 19:00 CEST (UTC+2) | Nišić (yellow card) 35'; Assifuah 36'; D. Gomis (yellow card) 39'; Dembélé (yellow card) 77'; Naidji 83' | Report | Barthelmé (yellow card) 35'; Roux (yellow card) 45+1'; Diarra (yellow card) 58'; Gomis (penalty missed) 80' | Stadium: Nouste Camp; Referee: Frank Schneider |

| 3 December 2021 17 | Sochaux | 2–1 | Pau | Montbéliard |
| 21:00 CET (UTC+1) | Ndour 47'; Thioune (yellow card) 53'; Lopy 90+3' | Report | Kouassi (yellow card) 55' (yellow-red card) 56'; Evans 70', (yellow card) 75' | Stadium: Stade Auguste Bonal; Referee: Nicolas Rainville |

| 11 December 2021 18 | Pau | 1–2 | Quevilly-Rouen | Pau |
| 19:00 CEST (UTC+2) | Daubin (yellow card) 82'; Keita 87'; Armand (yellow card) 90+10' | Report | Dekoke (yellow card) 46'; Nazon 56'; Ndilu 81' | Stadium: Nouste Camp; Referee: Gaël Angoula |

| 21 December 2021 19 | Niort | 3–0 | Pau | Niort |
| 20:45 CET (UTC+1) | Sissoko 48' (pen.); Merdji 73'; Boutobba 81' | Report | Lobry (yellow card) 17'; Koffi (yellow card) 60'; Batisse (yellow card) 62' | Stadium: Stade René Gaillard; Referee: Aurelian Petit |

| 8 January 2022 20 | Pau | 4–0 | Rodez | Pau |
| 19:00 CEST (UTC+2) | Kouassi (yellow card) 28'; Daubin (yellow card) 40'; Koffi 52'; Lobry 70'; Nišić (yellow card) 55', (goal) 60'; Naidji 76' | Report | Boissier (yellow card) 2'; Dépres (yellow card) 62' | Stadium: Nouste Camp; Referee: Bartolomeu Varela |

| 15 January 2022 21 | Toulouse | 1–1 | Pau | Toulouse |
| 19:00 CET (UTC+1) | Evitt-Healey (yellow card) 45'; Van den Boomen 78'; Spierings (yellow card) 85'; Rouault (yellow card) 90+3' | Report | Dembélé (yellow card) 23'; Daubin (yellow card) 32'; Nišić 54'; Koffi (yellow card) 77' | Stadium: Stadium de Toulouse; Referee: Frank Schneider |

| 1 February 2022 22 | Pau | 0–3 | Nîmes | Pau |
| 19:00 CEST (UTC+2) | Poha (yellow card) 51' | Report | Sainte-Luce (yellow card) 18'; Martinez (yellow card) 44'; Koné 59'; Benrahou 85' (pen.); Ómarsson 90+2' | Stadium: Nouste Camp; Referee: Remi Landry |

| 5 February 2022 23 | Bastia | 1–1 | Pau | Furiani |
| 19:00 CET (UTC+1) | Santelli 50' | Report | Essende 56' | Stadium: Stade Armand Cesari; Referee: Guillaume Paradis |

| 12 February 2022 24 | Dijon | 0–1 | Pau | Dijon |
| 19:00 CET (UTC+1) | Pi (yellow card) 18'; Le Bihan (yellow card) 90+3' | Report | Essende (yellow card) 22'; Boto (yellow card) 30'; Batisse (yellow card) 36'; Koffi 58'; Poha (yellow card) 69' | Stadium: Stade Gaston Gérard; Referee: Gaël Angoula |

| 19 February 2022 25 | Pau | 1–0 | Caen | Pau |
| 19:00 CET (UTC+1) | Daubin (yellow card) 54'; Koffi 59' | Report | Lepenant (yellow card) 69'; Oniangue (yellow card) 73'; Deminguet (yellow card) 79'; Abdi (yellow card) 90' | Stadium: Nouste Camp; Referee: Nicolas Rainville |

| 26 February 2022 26 | Valenciennes | 1–0 | Pau | Valenciennes |
| 19:00 CET (UTC+1) | Ayité 66'; Masson (yellow card) 71'; Bonnet (yellow card) 71'; Linguet (yellow card) 75' | Report | Dembélé (yellow card) 28' | Stadium: Stade du Hainaut; Referee: Benjamin Lepaysant |

| 5 March 2022 27 | Pau | 2–1 | Amiens | Pau |
| 19:00 CET (UTC+1) | Batisse (yellow card) 45+1'; Essende (yellow card) 63', (goal) 84'; El Melali 79' | Report | Pavlović 8'; Xantippe (yellow card) 57'; Zungu (yellow card) 66' (yellow-red card) 66' | Stadium: Nouste Camp; Referee: Pierre Legat |

| 12 March 2022 28 | Dunkerque | 1–0 | Pau | Dunkirk |
| 19:00 CET (UTC+1) | Tchokounté 31' | Report | Koffi (yellow card) 45+1'; Lobry (yellow card) 55'; Daubin (yellow card) 64'; Naidji (yellow card) 90'; Batisse (yellow card) 90+4' | Stadium: Stade Marcel-Tribut; Referee: Bartolomeu Varela |

| 15 March 2022 29 | Pau | 0–1 | Grenoble | Pau |
| 19:00 CET (UTC+1) | Dembélé (yellow card) 8'; Daubin (yellow card) 27'; Sylvestre (yellow card) 28'; Armand (yellow card) 46'; Kouassi (yellow card) 80' | Report | Ravet 29' (pen.); Abdallah (yellow card) 34'; Gaspar (yellow card) 54' (yellow-red card) 64'; Nestor (yellow card) 71'; Maubleu (yellow card) 77'; Anani (yellow card) 85' | Stadium: Nouste Camp; Referee: Mathieu Vernice |

| 19 March 2022 30 | Paris FC | 1–1 | Pau | Paris |
| 20:00 CET (UTC+1) | Koré (yellow card) 18'; Hadjam (yellow card) 51'; Boutaïb 79' (pen.) | Report | Armand 60', (yellow card) 85'; Batisse (yellow card) 75' | Stadium: Stade Sébastien Charléty; Referee: Remy Landry |

| 2 April 2022 31 | Pau | 2–1 | Le Havre | Pau |
| 19:00 CEST (UTC+2) | Armand 36'; Naidji 72'; Kouassi (yellow card) 90' | Report | Abline 23'; Gibaud (yellow card) 47' | Stadium: Nouste Camp; Referee: Gaël Angoula |

| 9 April 2022 32 | Ajaccio | 2–1 | Pau | Ajaccio |
| 19:00 CEST (UTC+2) | Krasso 59', (yellow card) 63', (goal) 69' | Report | Essende (yellow card) 30'; Armand (yellow card) 69'; Gomis 90+4' | Stadium: Stade François Coty; Referee: Alexandre Perreau Niel |

| 16 April 2022 33 | Pau | 1–4 | Auxerre | Pau |
| 15:00 CEST (UTC+2) | Daubin (yellow card) 11'; Lobry (yellow card) 43'; Sylvestre (red card) 55'; Kouassi (red card) 55'; Boto (yellow card) 64'; Batisse (yellow card) 68' | Report | Sakhi 5'; Hein 13', (yellow card) 81'; Sinayoko 74'; Joly 87' | Stadium: Nouste Camp; Referee: Aurelian Petit |

| 19 April 2022 34 | Guingamp | 3–0 | Pau | Guingamp |
| 20:00 CEST (UTC+2) | Cathline 18'; Diarra (yellow card) 32'; Gomis 40'; Barthelmé 59'; Lemonnier (yellow card) 90+1'; Quemper (yellow card) 90+2' | Report | Batisse (yellow card) 43'; Evans (yellow card) 53' | Stadium: Stade de Roudourou; Referee: Guillaume Paradis |

| 22 April 2022 35 | Pau | 0–1 | Sochaux | Pau |
| 21:00 CEST (UTC+2) | Poha (yellow card) 35' | Report | Kalulu 13'; Aaneba (yellow card) 73' | Stadium: Nouste Camp; Referee: Bartolomeu Varela |

| 30 April 2022 36 | Quevilly-Rouen | 1–2 | Pau | Le Petit-Quevilly |
| 20:00 CEST (UTC+2) | Sidibé 10'; Gbelle (yellow card) 32' | Report | Naidji 72'; Armand 88' | Stadium: Stade Robert Diochon; Referee: Nicolas Rainville |

| 7 May 2022 37 | Pau | 2–2 | Niort | Pau |
| 19:00 CEST (UTC+2) | Essende 16', 56' | Report | Zemzemi 8'; Boutobba 31' | Stadium: Nouste Camp; Referee: Remi Landry |

| 14 May 2022 38 | Nancy | 2–3 | Pau | Tomblaine |
| 19:00 CEST (UTC+2) | El Aynaoui 4'; L. Cissé 11'; Haag (yellow card) 60' | Report | Essende 10'; Gomis 28'; Batisse 36', (yellow card) 88' | Stadium: Stade Marcel Picot; Referee: Arnaud Baert |

=== Coupe de France ===
| 13 November 2021 Seventh round | Canet Roussillon FC | 2–2 (3–2 p) | Pau | Canet-en-Roussillon |
| 19:00 CET (UTC+1) | Ouadoudi 40'; Rambaud 67' | Report | Essende 4'; Gomis 18' | Stadium: Stade Saint-Michel; Referee: Floris Aubin |
