= Ouadah =

Ouadah is a surname. Notable people with the surname include:

- Abdelali Ouadah (born 1988), French footballer
- Abdelnasser Ouadah (born 1975), French-born Algerian footballer
- El Hadi Fayçal Ouadah (born 1983), Algerian footballer
- Isma Ouadah (born 1983), Algerian footballer
- Mohamed Ouadah (born 1994), French footballer
