= Ilan Kebbal =

Footballer (born 1998)

Personal information
- Full name: Ilan Kais Kebbal
- Date of birth: 10 July 1998 (age 28)
- Place of birth: Marseille, France
- Height: 1.69 m (5 ft 7 in)
- Position: Attacking midfielder

Team information
- Current team: Paris
- Number: 10

Youth career
- 2011–2015: Burel
- 2015–2016: Marignane Gignac

Senior career*
Years	Team	Apps	(Gls)
2016–2017	Bordeaux B	24	(0)
2018–2019	Côte Bleue	20	(3)
2019–2020	Reims B	15	(3)
2021–2023	Reims	31	(1)
2020	→ Lyon-Duchère (loan)	5	(2)
2020–2021	→ Dunkerque (loan)	35	(3)
2022–2023	→ Paris (loan)	25	(4)
2023–	Paris	96	(20)

International career^{‡}
2025–	Algeria	5	(0)
- * Club domestic league appearances and goals as of 19 May 2026 ‡ National team caps and goals as of 29 Septembre 2026

Ilan Kais Kebbal (born 10 July 1998) is a professional footballer who plays as a attacking midfielder for Ligue 1 club Paris. Born in France, he plays for the Algeria national team.

== Club career ==
Kebbal went through the reserve teams of Bordeaux and then Reims before joining Dunkerque on 2 July 2020. He made his professional debut with Dunkerque in a 1–0 Ligue 2 win over Toulouse on 22 August 2020.

On 31 August 2025, Kebbal scored a brace in Paris FC's 3–2 victory over Metz, their first Ligue 1 win since 1979.

== International career ==
Born in France, Kebbal is of Algerian descent and holds dual French and Algerian citizenship. Kebbal was called up to the Algeria national team in October 2021, but did not make an appearance. On 28 August 2025, he was once again called up to the national team.

== Career statistics ==
=== Club ===
As of match played 17 May 2026

Appearances and goals by club, season, and competition
Club	Season	League			National cup		Other		Total	
Club	Season	Division	Apps	Goals	Apps	Goals	Apps	Goals	Apps	Goals
Bordeaux B	2016–17	CFA 2	9	0	—		—		9	0
Bordeaux B	2017–18	National 3	15	0	—		—		15	0
Bordeaux B	Total		24	0	—		—		24	0
Côte Bleue	2018–19	National 3	20	3	2	1	—		22	4
Reims B	2019–20	National 2	15	3	—		—		15	3
Lyon-Duchère (loan)	2019–20	National	5	2	0	0	—		5	2
Dunkerque (loan)	2020–21	Ligue 2	35	3	1	0	—		36	3
Reims	2021–22	Ligue 1	31	1	3	0	—		34	1
Paris FC (loan)	2022–23	Ligue 2	25	4	4	0	—		29	4
Paris FC	2023–24	Ligue 2	37	6	4	2	0	0	41	8
Paris FC	2024–25	Ligue 2	30	5	1	0	—		31	5
Paris FC	2025–26	Ligue 1	29	9	2	0	—		31	9
Paris FC	Total		96	20	7	2	0	0	103	22
Career total			251	36	17	3	0	0	266	39

== Honours ==
Individual

- UNFP Ligue 2 Team of the Year: 2023–24
- UNFP Ligue 1 Player of the Month: August 2025
