= Maxence Renoud =

French footballer (born 2000)

Personal information
- Date of birth: 8 February 2000 (age 26)
- Place of birth: Voiron, France
- Height: 1.71 m (5 ft 7 in)
- Position: Winger

Youth career
- USV Saint-Geoire-en-Valdaine
- US La Murette
- Bourg-en-Bresse
- FC Lyon
- ASPTT Dijon

Senior career*
Years	Team	Apps	(Gls)
2019–2020	Montceau	14	(1)
2020–2021	Grenoble	1	(0)
2021–2022	Concarneau	12	(0)
2022–2023	Lyon La Duchère	27	(4)
2023–2024	Stade Lausanne Ouchy	0	(0)
2024	→ Marignane GCB (loan)	16	(1)
2024–2025	Rumilly-Vallières	8	(0)
2025–2026	Dynamo České Budějovice	13	(0)
- * Club domestic league appearances and goals as of 13:23, 19 June 2026 (UTC)

Maxence Renoud (born 8 February 2000) is a French professional footballer who plays as a winger.

== Professional career ==
With 9 assist in his debut season with Montceau, Renoud was the top assister in the Championnat National 3. On 15 June 2020, Renoud signed a professional contract with Grenoble. Renoud made his professional debut with Grenoble in a 1-0 Ligue 2 loss to Guingamp on 26 September 2020.

On 9 June 2021, he signed with Concarneau.

On 30 June 2022, Renoud joined Lyon La Duchère on a one-year deal.

On 23 June 2023, Renoud signed with Stade Lausanne Ouchy in Switzerland. On 5 January 2024, he joined Marignane GCB un loan until the end of the season.

On 11 July 2025, Renoud signed a contract with Czech National Football League club Dynamo České Budějovice.
