= Ali Bamba =

Ivorian footballer (born 1991)

Personal information
- Full name: Ali Vanomo Bamba
- Date of birth: 2 July 1991 (age 35)
- Place of birth: Bingerville, Ivory Coast
- Height: 1.90 m (6 ft 3 in)
- Position: Left-back

Team information
- Current team: Bourges Foot 18
- Number: 5

Youth career
- JS Bassam
- –2008: AC Sidi Ifni
- 2008–2009: SO Armée
- 2009–2011: Le Mans

Senior career*
Years	Team	Apps	(Gls)
2009–2013	Le Mans B	48	(0)
2011–2013	Le Mans	24	(0)
2012–2013	→ Metz (loan)	10	(0)
2012	→ Metz B (loan)	7	(0)
2013–2015	Metz	0	(0)
2013–2015	Metz B	5	(0)
2014	→ Strasbourg (loan)	10	(0)
2015–2016	→ Seraing United (loan)	23	(2)
2017–2018	Yzeure	27	(0)
2018–2019	Cholet	14	(0)
2019–2020	Marignane Gignac	18	(1)
2020–2021	Bourges Foot	7	(0)
2021–2024	Marignane GCB	80	(0)
2024–	Bourges Foot 18	11	(0)
- * Club domestic league appearances and goals as of 7 December 2024 (UTC)

Ali Vanomo Bamba (born 2 July 1991) is an Ivorian professional footballer who plays as a left-back for French Championnat National 1 club Bourges Foot 18.

== Career ==
On 19 August 2012, Le Mans announced on its website that Bamba was moving on loan to Belgian Pro League team Oud-Heverlee Leuven. However, two days later, OH Leuven announced that despite the interest in Bamba, they had rejected him after failing the medical tests.

On 4 September 2012, Bamba joined Championnat National side Metz on a loan deal. After his return to Ligue 2, Le Mans, he was released and he returned permanently to Metz, now also in Ligue 2. Bamba played only a few games with the reserve team of Metz and was loaned out in December 2013 to Strasbourg.
