= Leverton Pierre =

Haitian footballer (born 1998)

Personal information
- Date of birth: 9 March 1998 (age 28)
- Place of birth: Tabarre, Haiti
- Height: 1.81 m (5 ft 11 in)
- Position: Midfielder

Team information
- Current team: Académica de Coimbra

Youth career
- CS Saint-Louis

Senior career*
| Years | Team | Apps | (Gls) |
| 2016–2017 | Bastia II | 8 | (0) |
| 2017–2019 | Ajaccio II | 23 | (13) |
| 2017–2019 | Ajaccio | 1 | (0) |
| 2019–2020 | Metz | 0 | (0) |
| 2019–2020 | → Dunkerque (loan) | 23 | (1) |
| 2020–2023 | Dunkerque | 85 | (2) |
| 2023–2024 | Avranches | 28 | (4) |
| 2024–2025 | Châteauroux | 25 | (1) |
| 2025–2026 | Vizela | 11 | (0) |
| 2026– | Académica de Coimbra | 0 | (0) |

International career^{‡}
| 2016 | Haiti U20 | 10 | (1) |
| 2021– | Haiti | 34 | (0) |
- * Club domestic league appearances and goals as of 29 August 2026 ‡ National team caps and goals as of 17:25, 31 March 2026 (UTC)

Leverton Pierre (born 9 March 1998) is a Haitian professional footballer who plays as a midfielder for Liga Portugal 2 club Académica de Coimbra and the Haiti national team.

== Club career ==
Pierre signed his first professional contract with Bastia on 29 July 2017, joining from the Haitian club CS Saint-Louis. He made his professional debut with Ajaccio in a 2–0 loss to Valenciennes on 16 February 2018.

On 1 July 2025, Pierre signed for Liga Portugal 2 club Vizela for one season.

== International career ==
Pierre was part of the Haiti national under-20 football team that won the 2017 CONCACAF U-20 Championship qualifying tournament, scoring one goal in the process. In May 2019, he was named to Haiti's 40-man provisional squad for the 2019 CONCACAF Gold Cup. He debuted with the senior Haiti national team in a 1–0 2022 FIFA World Cup qualification loss to Canada on 12 June 2021.

On 15 May 2026, he was named in Haiti's squad for the 2026 FIFA World Cup. However, he withdrew from the squad due to injury and was replaced by Garven Metusala on 11 June.

== Career statistics ==
=== Club ===
As of match played 28 February 2026

Appearances and goals by club, season and competition
| Club | Season | League | | | National cup | | Europe | | Other | | Total | |
| Club | Season | Division | Apps | Goals | Apps | Goals | Apps | Goals | Apps | Goals | Apps | Goals |
|---|---|---|---|---|---|---|---|---|---|---|---|---|
| Bastia II | 2016–17 | National 3 | 8 | 0 | — | | — | | — | | 8 | 0 |
| Ajaccio II | 2017–18 | National 3 | 19 | 13 | — | | — | | — | | 19 | 13 |
| Ajaccio II | 2018–19 | National 3 | 4 | 0 | — | | — | | — | | 4 | 0 |
| Ajaccio II | Total | | 23 | 13 | — | | — | | — | | 23 | 13 |
| Ajaccio | 2017–18 | Ligue 2 | 1 | 0 | 2 | 0 | — | | 1 (Note: Appearance in Ligue 1 relegation/promotion play-offs) | 0 | 4 | 0 |
| Metz | 2018–19 | Ligue 2 | 0 | 0 | 0 | 0 | — | | — | | 0 | 0 |
| Dunkerque (loan) | 2019–20 | Ligue 3 | 23 | 1 | 2 | 0 | — | | — | | 25 | 1 |
| Dunkerque | 2020–21 | Ligue 2 | 29 | 1 | 1 | 0 | — | | — | | 30 | 1 |
| Dunkerque | 2021–22 | Ligue 2 | 28 | 1 | 1 | 0 | — | | — | | 29 | 1 |
| Dunkerque | 2022–23 | Ligue 3 | 28 | 0 | 5 | 0 | — | | — | | 33 | 0 |
| Dunkerque | Total | | 85 | 2 | 7 | 0 | — | | — | | 92 | 2 |
| Avranches | 2023–24 | Ligue 3 | 28 | 4 | 0 | 0 | — | | — | | 28 | 4 |
| Châteauroux | 2024–25 | Ligue 3 | 25 | 1 | — | | — | | — | | 25 | 1 |
| Vizela | 2025–26 | Liga Portugal 2 | 9 | 0 | 1 | 0 | — | | — | | 10 | 0 |
| Career total | | | 202 | 21 | 12 | 0 | 0 | 0 | 1 | 0 | 215 | 21 |

=== International ===
As of match played 31 March 2026

Appearances and goals by national team and year
| National team | Year | Apps | Goals |
|---|---|---|---|
| Haiti | 2021 | 7 | 0 |
| Haiti | 2022 | 4 | 0 |
| Haiti | 2023 | 5 | 0 |
| Haiti | 2024 | 5 | 0 |
| Haiti | 2025 | 11 | 0 |
| Haiti | 2026 | 2 | 0 |
| Total | | 34 | 0 |

== Honors ==
Haiti U20

- CFU U-20 Tournament: 2016
- 2017 CONCACAF U-20 Championship qualifying
