= Nicolas Huysman =

French footballer (born 1968)

Personal information
- Full name: Nicolas Huysman
- Date of birth: 9 February 1968 (age 58)
- Place of birth: Dunkirk, France
- Height: 1.82 m (6 ft 0 in)
- Position: Attacking midfielder

Senior career*
Years	Team	Apps	(Gls)
1984–1990	Dunkerque	170	(16)
1990–1993	Metz	103	(18)
1993–1995	Caen	54	(3)
1995–1999	Le Havre	109	(14)
1999–2001	Créteil	70	(12)
2001–2002	Dunkerque	7	(1)

Managerial career
- 2002–2010: Dunkerque
- 2012: Dunkerque
- 2012–2016: Dunkerque B
- 2016–2019: Royal Francs-Borains
- 2019: Jeunesse Esch
- * Club domestic league appearances and goals

Nicolas Huysman (born 9 February 1968) is a former French professional footballer who played as an attacking midfielder and manager.

== Career ==
Huysman started his career with Dunkerque in 1984 and spent six seasons with the club before transferring to Ligue 1 side Metz. He went on to play for Caen, Le Havre and Créteil before returning to Dunkerque at the end of his career. Huysman was appointed manager of Dunkerque in 2002 and held the position for eight years before being replaced by Ludovic Pollet in March 2010. Following the departure of Pollet in February 2012, Huysman was re-appointed as manager.

== Personal life ==
Huysman is the father of the French footballer Jérémy Huysman.
