= Houssen Abderrahmane =

Footballer (born 1995)

Personal information
- Date of birth: 3 February 1995 (age 31)
- Place of birth: Creil, France
- Height: 1.86 m (6 ft 1 in)
- Position: Defender

Team information
- Current team: Cannes
- Number: 27

Youth career
- 2001–2008: Liancourt
- 2008–2009: Chantilly
- 2009–2011: Strasbourg
- 2011–2013: Lorient
- 2013–2015: Amiens

Senior career*
Years	Team	Apps	(Gls)
2015–2019	Raon-l'Étape	76	(3)
2018–2020	Louhans-Cuiseaux	44	(6)
2020–2021	RWDM	1	(0)
2021–2022	Francs Borains	25	(3)
2022–2024	Marignane GCB	55	(1)
2024–	Cannes	6	(1)

International career^{‡}
2016–	Mauritania	4	(0)
- * Club domestic league appearances and goals as of 19 November 2024 ‡ National team caps and goals as of 7 September 2019

Houssen Abderrahmane (born 3 February 1995) is a professional footballer who plays as a defender for Ligue 3 club Cannes. Born in France, he plays for the Mauritania national team.

== Club career ==
In July 2020, Abderrahmane signed with Belgian First Division B club RWDM on a one-year contract, with an option for an additional year.

On 29 August 2021, he joined Francs Borains in the Belgian third tier. He made his competitive debut for the club on 12 September in a league game against La Louvière Centre, also scoring his first goal to secure a 2–0 win for his side.

== International career ==
Abderrahmane debuted for the Mauritania national team in 2016.

== Career statistics ==
=== Career ===
As of 9 March 2024

Appearances and goals by club, season and competition
Club	Season	League			National cup (Note: Includes Slovenian Football Cup, U.S. Open Cup, Icelandic Men's Football Cup)		Total	
Club	Season	Division	Apps	Goals	Apps	Goals	Apps	Goals
Raon-l'Étape	2015-16	Championnat National 3	15	0	1	0	16	0
Raon-l'Étape	2016-17	Championnat National 2	27	2	—		27	2
Raon-l'Étape	2017-18	Championnat National 2	29	1	2	0	31	1
Raon-l'Étape	Total		71	3	3	0	74	3
Louhans-Cuiseaux	2018-219	Championnat National 3	24	5	1	0	25	5
Louhans-Cuiseaux	2019-20	Championnat National 2	19	1	—		19	1
Louhans-Cuiseaux	Total		43	6	1	0	44	6
RWDM	2020-21	Challenger Pro League	1	0	—		1	0
Francs Borains	2021-22	Belgian National Division 1	25	3	1	0	26	3
Marignane GCB	2022-23	Championnat National 2	24	1	—		24	1
Marignane GCB	2023-24	Championnat National	21	0	—		21	0
Marignane GCB	Total		45	1	—		45	1
Career Total			185	13	5	0	190	13
