= Guillaume Bosca =

French footballer (born 1989)

Personal information
- Date of birth: 23 October 1989 (age 37)
- Place of birth: Martigues, France
- Height: 1.76 m (5 ft 9 in)
- Position: Forward

Team information
- Current team: Marseille Endoume

Senior career*
Years	Team	Apps	(Gls)
2011–2016	Marignane	112	(18)
2016–2019	Marignane Gignac	92	(28)
2019–2021	Dunkerque	57	(13)
2021–2022	Red Star	20	(0)
2022–2025	Marignane GCB		
2025–	Marseille Endoume		
- * Club domestic league appearances and goals as of 11:21, 21 August 2026 (UTC)

Guillaume Bosca (born 23 October 1989) is a French professional footballer who plays as a forward for Marseille Endoume.

== Career ==
Bosca was born in Martigues. He made his professional debut with Dunkerque in a 1–0 Ligue 2 win over Toulouse on 22 August 2020.

Having been released by Dunkerque at the end of the 2020–21 season, he moved to Red Star of the Championnat National. He signed a two-year contract with the option of a third year. The contract was terminated by mutual consent on 24 June 2022.

Bosca later played for Marignane GCB.

In November 2025 he left Marignane GCB for Marseille Endoume, playing in Regional 2.
