= Marignane Gignac Côte Bleue FC =

Football club based in Marignane, France

Marignane Gignac Côte Bleue
- Full name: Marignane Gignac Côte Bleue Football Club
- Nickname: Les Aviateurs (The Aviators)
- Founded: 6 June 1924; 102 years ago
- Stadium: Stade Saint-Exupéry
- Capacity: 1,500
- Coordinates: 43°25′03″N 5°12′39″E
- Chairman: Marc Vincendone, Michel Léonardi
- Manager: Brahim Hemdani
- League: Championnat National 2
- 2024–25: National 2 Group A, 12th of 16
- Website: www.mgfc-foot.com
Home colours	Away colours

Marignane Gignac Côte Bleue Football Club (French pronunciation: [maʁiɲan ʒiɲak kot blø futbol klœb]), also known as Marignane GCB (French pronunciation: [maʁiɲan ʒe.se.be]), Marignane Gignac CB, Marignane Gignac, Marignane, or MGCB FC, is a French football club based in Marignane, Bouches-du-Rhône. Competing in the Championnat National 1, the fourth-tier of French football, the club plays its home matches at the Stade Saint-Exupéry. The club played only one season in Division 2; the 1965–66 season.

== History ==
It was founded in 1924 as Union Sportive Marignanaise. In 2016, US Marignanaise merged with AS Gignac to form Marignane Gignac FC. In July 2022, the club merged with FC Côte Bleue and became Marignane Gignac Côte Bleue FC (MGCB FC).

At the end of the 2022–23 season, the club achieved promotion from the Championnat National 2 to the Championnat National. They suffered relegation at the conclusion of the 2023–24 Championnat National, finishing sixteenth.

== Current squad ==
As of 16 January 2024

Note: Flags indicate national team as defined under FIFA eligibility rules; some limited exceptions apply. Players may hold more than one non-FIFA nationality.

No.	Pos.	Nation	Player
1	GK	FRA	Anthony Herbin
4	DF	CIV	Ali Bamba
6	DF	FRA	Loni Quenabio
7	FW	FRA	Guillaume Bosca
8	MF	FRA	Charif Benhamza
9	FW	FRA	Karim Bouhmidi
10	FW	MLI	Diawoye Diarra
11	DF	FRA	Diaby Doucouré
12	FW	FRA	Mehdi Nagui
13	FW	FRA	Bissourou Touré
15	MF	FRA	Maxence Renoud (on loan from Stade Lausanne Ouchy)
16	GK	FRA	Léo Colin
17	DF	ALG	Abdelkrim Khechmar

No.	Pos.	Nation	Player
18	DF	CIV	Dany Goprou
19	MF	FRA	Youness Diatta
20	DF	MTN	Houssen Abderrahmane
21	DF	FRA	Émile Haegeli
22	MF	CGO	Randi Goteni
23	FW	FRA	Malick Thiaw
24	MF	FRA	Joris Mallet
25	DF	COD	Osée Diampo Sengele
26	MF	COM	Salim Mramboini
28	MF	FRA	Hugo Vien
29	MF	FRA	Mansour Sy
30	GK	ALG	Cyril Boukhit
