= Cheick Fantamady Diarra =

Malian footballer

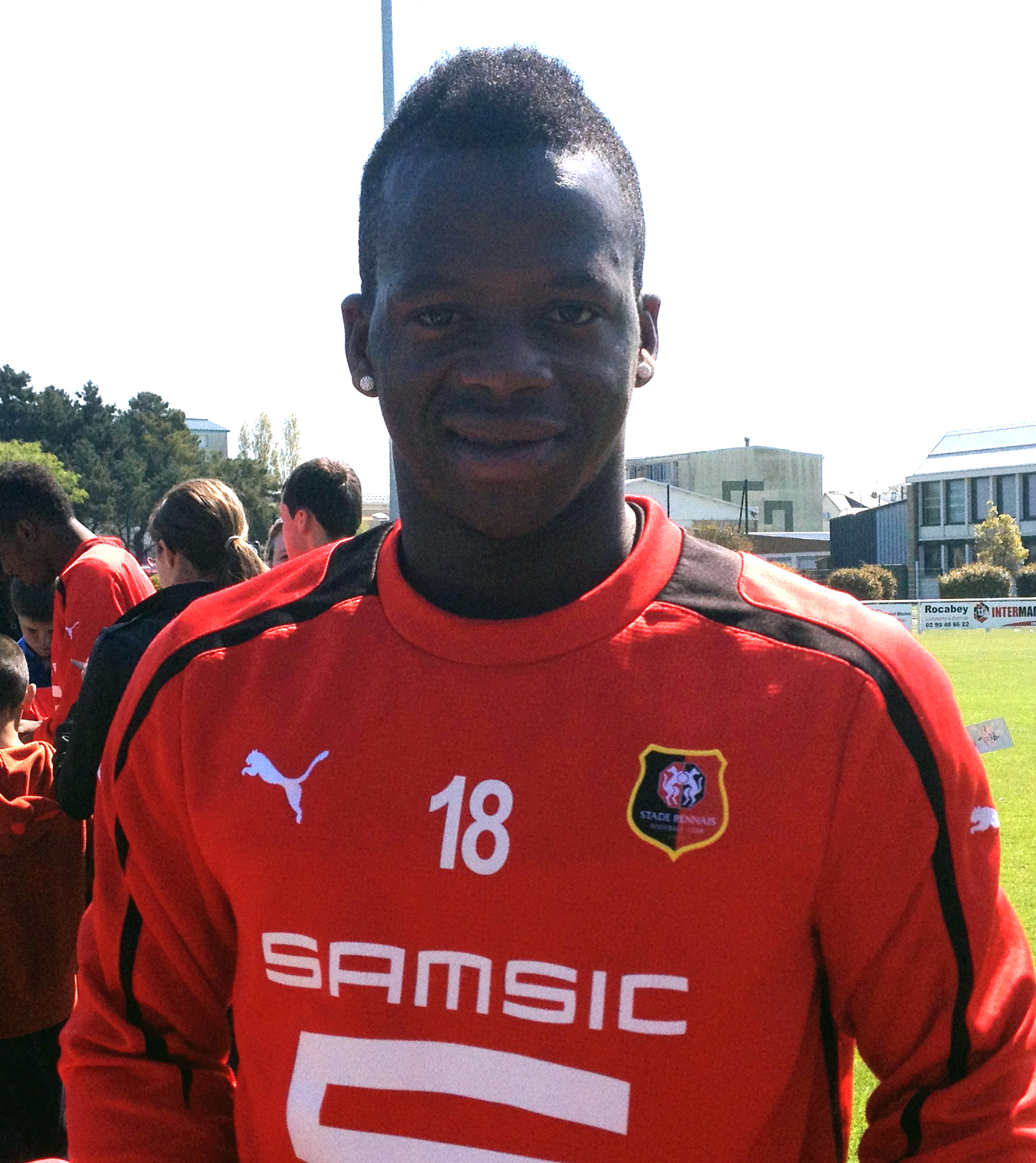
- Diarra training with Rennes in May 2013

Personal information
- Date of birth: 11 February 1992 (age 34)
- Place of birth: Bamako, Mali
- Height: 1.76 m (5 ft 9 in)
- Position: Striker

Youth career
- Centre Salif Keita

Senior career*
Years	Team	Apps	(Gls)
2011–2015	Rennes	19	(1)
2012–2015	Rennes B	5	(4)
2013–2014	→ Istres (loan)	28	(9)
2014–2015	→ Auxerre (loan)	35	(5)
2014–2015	→ Auxerre B (loan)	2	(0)
2015–2016	Auxerre	17	(4)
2015	Auxerre B	1	(0)
2016	Paris FC	13	(2)
2016–2018	Tours	53	(14)
2018–2020	Châteauroux	44	(7)
2019	Châteauroux B	2	(2)
2020–2021	Dunkerque	32	(6)
2021–2022	Créteil	10	(5)
2022–2023	Paris 13 Atletico	9	(0)
2024	Al-Fujairah		

International career
2008–2016	Mali	15	(3)
Medal record
Men's football
Representing Mali
Africa Cup of Nations
Third place	2013 South Africa
- * Club domestic league appearances and goals as of 12:40, 31 July 2022 (UTC)

Cheick Fantamady Diarra (born 11 February 1992) is a Malian professional footballer who plays as a striker.

== Career ==
Diarra began his career with Centre Salif Keita, later played with Stade Malien. On 6 July 2011, he moved to Rennes. He was loaned to Ligue 2 club Istres for the 2013–14 season.

He was again loaned in Ligue 2 the following season to Auxerre.

On 15 July 2016, Fantamady Diarra joined Ligue 2 club Tours.

On 18 August 2018, he joined Ligue 2 club Châteauroux.

On 8 September 2021, he moved to Créteil for the 2021–22 season.

On 17 July 2022, Diarra signed with Paris 13 Atletico.

== Career statistics ==
=== International goals ===
Scores and results list Mali's goal tally first, score column indicates score after each Diarra goal.

List of international goals scored by Cheick Fantamady Diarra
No.	Date	Venue	Opponent	Score	Result	Competition
1	6 February 2013	Moses Mabhida Stadium, Durban, South Africa	Nigeria	1–4	1–4	2013 Africa Cup of Nations
2	31 May 2014	Stadion Gradski vrt, Osijek, Croatia	Croatia	1–2	1–2	Friendly
3	6 June 2015	Centre Sportif de Maâmora, Salé, Morocco	Libya	1–1	2–2	Friendly

== Honours ==
Mali

- Africa Cup of Nations bronze: 2013
