= Randi Goteni =

Congolese footballer (born 1995)

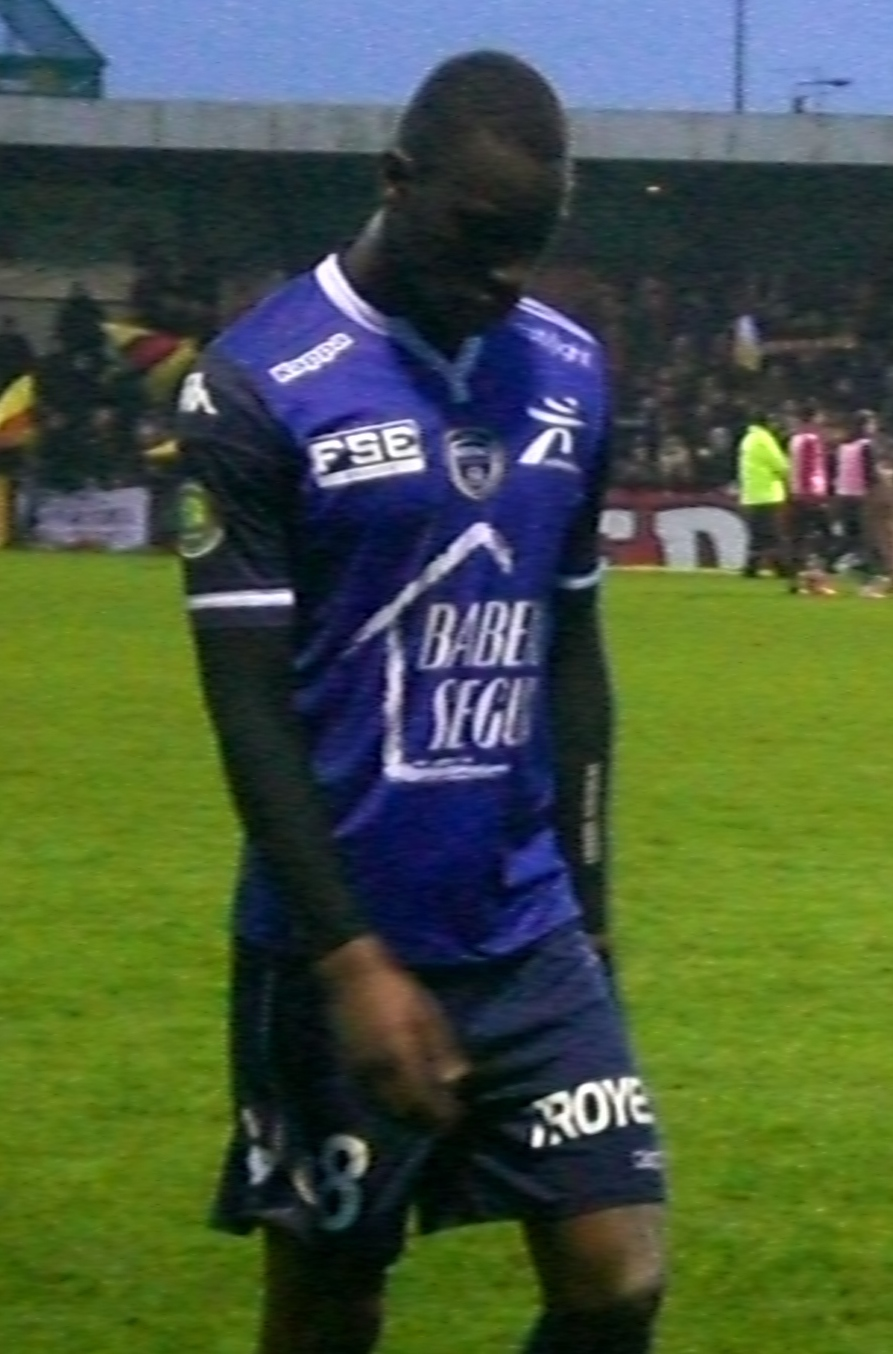
- Goteni with Troyes B in 2016

Personal information
- Date of birth: 5 July 1995 (age 31)
- Place of birth: Brazzaville, Republic of the Congo
- Height: 1.89 m (6 ft 2 in)
- Position: Midfielder

Team information
- Current team: R.E. Virton
- Number: 25

Youth career
- 2004–2007: AF Fontaine d'Ouche
- 2007–2010: Dijon
- 2010–2012: Troyes

Senior career*
Years	Team	Apps	(Gls)
2012–2019	Troyes B	68	(2)
2016–2019	Troyes	9	(0)
2017–2018	→ Béziers (loan)	10	(1)
2019	→ Dunkerque (loan)	16	(0)
2019–2021	Dunkerque	39	(1)
2021–2022	Laval B	3	(0)
2021–2022	Laval	10	(1)
2022–2023	Paris 13 Atletico	15	(0)
2023–2024	Marignane GCB	24	(0)
2024–	R.E. Virton	6	(0)

International career^{‡}
2011	France U16	1	(0)
2015	Congo U20	1	(0)
2019–	Congo	3	(0)
- * Club domestic league appearances and goals as of 6 June 2025 ‡ National team caps and goals as of 17:15, 8 May 2022 (UTC)

Randi Goteni (born 5 July 1995) is a Congolese professional footballer who plays as a midfielder for R.E. Virton and the Congo national team.

== Club career ==
In the summer of 2017, Goteni joined Championnat National side Béziers on loan from Troyes for the 2017–18 season. He joined Dunkerque on loan in December 2018. In June 2019, he signed a one-year contract with Dunkerque.

On 17 June 2021, Goteni joined Laval. On 24 June 2022, he signed for Paris 13 Atletico.

== International career ==
Goteni was born in the Republic of the Congo, but raised in France. He represented the France U16 in a friendly in 2011. Goteni debuted for the Congo U20s for a friendly in 2015. He made his Congo national team debut on 10 October 2019 in a friendly against Thailand.

== Honours ==
Laval

- Championnat National: 2021–22
