= Adam Abeddou =

French footballer (born 1996)

Personal information
- Date of birth: 17 August 1996 (age 30)
- Place of birth: Arras, France
- Height: 1.70 m (5 ft 7 in)
- Position: Forward

Team information
- Current team: Feignies Aulnoye

Youth career
- Saint-Laurent-Blangy
- 2006–2009: Lens
- 2009–2013: Valenciennes
- 2013–2014: Wasquehal
- 2014–2015: Arras

Senior career*
Years	Team	Apps	(Gls)
2015–2017	Arras	38	(1)
2017–2022	Vimy	25	(14)
2022–2023	Dunkerque	9	(0)
2022–2023	→ Boulogne (loan)	14	(2)
2023–2024	Lens B	22	(11)
2024–	Feignies Aulnoye	11	(1)
- * Club domestic league appearances and goals as of 7 December 2024

Adam Abeddou (born 17 August 1996) is a French professional footballer who plays as a forward for Championnat National 2 side Feignies Aulnoye.

== Club career ==
Abeddou is a youth product of the academies of his local side Saint-Laurent-Blangy, Lens, Valenciennes, and Wasquehal. He began his senior footballing career with Arras in the 4th division of France in 2015. He moved to Vimy, and in the first half of the 2021–22 season he was the top scorer in his group with 10 goals in 9 games. He transferred to Dunkerque in the Ligue 2 on 19 January 2022. He made his professional debut with Dunkerque in a 1–0 Ligue 2 win over Nîmes on 5 February 2022.

== Personal life ==
Born in France, Abeddou holds French and Algerian nationalities.
