= Jorris Romil =

Association football player (born 1994)

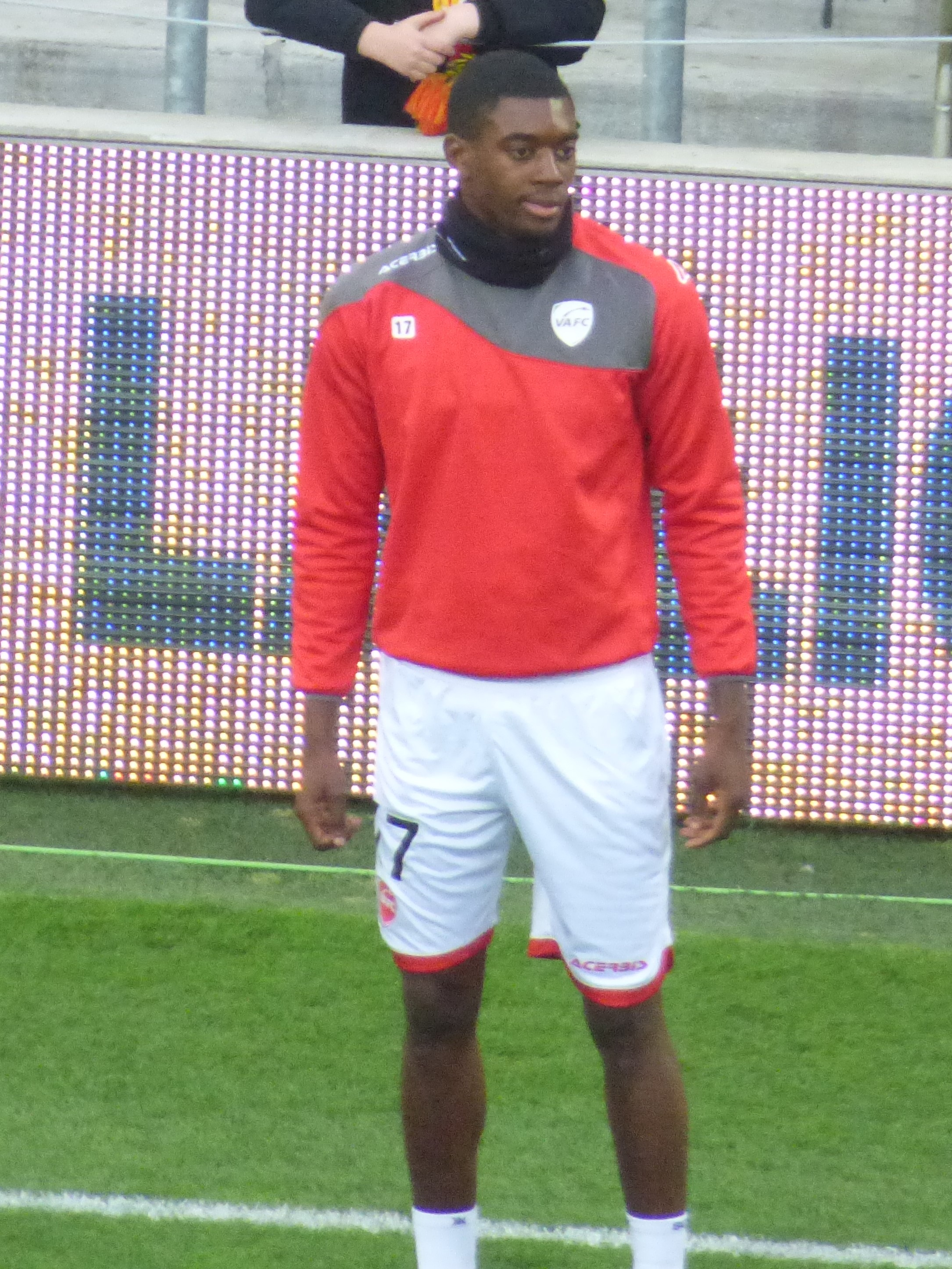
- Romil with Valenciennes in 2019

Personal information
- Date of birth: 27 December 1994 (age 31)
- Place of birth: Creil, France
- Height: 1.85 m (6 ft 1 in)
- Position: Forward

Team information
- Current team: Linas-Montlhéry

Youth career
- 2006–2014: Reims

Senior career*
| Years | Team | Apps | (Gls) |
| 2012–2014 | Reims B | 12 | (3) |
| 2014–2015 | Drancy | 6 | (1) |
| 2015–2016 | Sablé | 26 | (12) |
| 2016–2017 | Bordeaux B | 23 | (13) |
| 2017–2020 | Valenciennes | 43 | (4) |
| 2018 | → Les Herbiers (loan) | 8 | (0) |
| 2020–2021 | Dunkerque | 24 | (2) |
| 2021–2022 | Chambly | 15 | (2) |
| 2022–2024 | Trélissac | 44 | (7) |
| 2024– | Linas-Montlhéry | 3 | (2) |

International career
| 2019 | Guadeloupe | 1 | (0) |
- * Club domestic league appearances and goals as of 21 September 2024

Jorris Romil (born 27 December 1994) is a professional footballer who plays as a forward for Championnat National 3 club Linas-Montlhéry. Born in metropolitan France, he represents Guadeloupe at international level.

== Club career ==
Romil started football at the age of 12 and was part of the Reims academy, leaving at the age of 19 because of disagreements with the club and moved to the lower divisions in France. Romil made his professional debut for Valenciennes in a 1–1 Ligue 2 tie with Gazélec Ajaccio on 28 July 2017.

Romil was loaned to Les Herbiers on 2 January 2018.

On the last day of the 2019–20 winter transfer window, Romil was released from his contract by Valenciennes and signed a deal with Dunkerque, initially until the end of the season, but with an option to extend for another season.

== International career ==
On 23 March 2019, Romil made his debut for the Guadeloupe national team in a CONCACAF Nations League qualifier against Martinique, as a starter.

== Honours ==
Les Herbiers

- Coupe de France runner-up: 2017–18
