= Abdelali Ouadah =

French footballer (born 1988)

Personal information
- Date of birth: 15 April 1988 (age 38)
- Place of birth: Louviers, France
- Height: 1.75 m (5 ft 9 in)
- Position: Right-back

Team information
- Current team: Oissel

Senior career*
Years	Team	Apps	(Gls)
2009–2010	Roye	4	(2)
2010–2011	Amiens II	0	(0)
2011–2012	Avion	8	(1)
2012–2013	Ailly	22	(0)
2013–2014	Oissel	23	(8)
2014–2016	Rodez	43	(2)
2016–2017	USM El Harrach	10	(0)
2017	O Médéa	5	(0)
2017–2022	Rouen	85	(2)
2022–	Oissel	37	(0)
- * Club domestic league appearances and goals as of 9 November 2024

Abdelali Ouadah (born 15 April 1988) is a French professional footballer who plays as a right-back for Championnat National 3 club Oissel.

== Career ==
Ouadah began his senior career with Roye, and had a stint with the reserves of Amiens. His early career was mostly in the semi-pro leagues of France with Avion, Ailly, Oissel and Rodez. He moved to Algeria with USM El Harrach and O Médéa from 2017 to 2017. He made his professional debut with USM El Harrach in a 2–1 Algerian Ligue Professionnelle 1 win over MC Alger on 27 August 2016. In the summer of 2017, he returned to France with Rouen.

== Personal life ==
Born in France, Ouadah is Algerian by descent. His brother, Mohamed Ouadah, is also a professional footballer.
