= Antoine Batisse =

French footballer (born 1995)

Personal information
- Date of birth: 13 January 1995 (age 31)
- Place of birth: Versailles, France
- Height: 1.86 m (6 ft 1 in)
- Position: Midfielder

Team information
- Current team: Forge FC
- Number: 4

Youth career
- 2004–2009: La Rochelle
- 2009–2014: Chamois Niortais

Senior career*
| Years | Team | Apps | (Gls) |
| 2014–2018 | Chamois Niortais | 36 | (0) |
| 2016–2017 | → Boulogne (loan) | 5 | (0) |
| 2018–2024 | Pau | 142 | (7) |
| 2023 | Pau B | 3 | (0) |
| 2024 | Quevilly-Rouen | 17 | (1) |
| 2024–2026 | IMT | 36 | (2) |
| 2026– | Forge FC | 26 | (4) |
- * Club domestic league appearances and goals as of 25 October 2026

Antoine Batisse (born 13 January 1995) is a French professional footballer who plays as a defender or midfielder for Canadian Premier League club Forge FC.

== Career ==
Batisse was born in Versailles, a suburb of Paris, but grew up in the west of France. He joined Niort as a youngster in 2009, having previously played for nearby La Rochelle. He graduated through the club's youth system and was awarded his first professional contract ahead of the 2014–15 season. Batisse made his debut for Niort in the 2–1 home win over Angers on 26 September 2014, playing the entire match. The midfielder was also involved in the side's run to the last 32 of the Coupe de France that season, featuring in victories against Chauvigny and Genêts Anglet.

=== Pau FC ===
Antoine Batisse joined his former teammate Quentin Daubin at Pau FC at the beginning of the 2018-2019 season.

He quickly established himself as a key player in the team and contributed to Pau FC's promotion to Ligue 2.

In 2022, Batisse, now an iconic captain of Pau FC since their promotion to Ligue 2, extended his contract for an additional two years.

A cornerstone of Didier Tholot's team, Batisse unfortunately suffered a knee ligament rupture during training at the start of the 2022–23 season. His season was cut short after 4 matches and 360 minutes on the field.

Batisse made his comeback on 1 April 2023, at Nouste Camp, during a Ligue 2 match against Le Havre.

=== Quevilly-Rouen ===
On 16 January 2024, Batisse signed with Quevilly-Rouen.

== Career statistics ==
As of match played 14 May 2022

Appearances and goals by club, season and competition
| Club | Season | League | | | Coupe de France | | Coupe de la Ligue | | Total | |
| Club | Season | Division | Apps | Goals | Apps | Goals | Apps | Goals | Apps | Goals |
|---|---|---|---|---|---|---|---|---|---|---|
| Chamois Niortais | 2014–15 | Ligue 2 | 7 | 0 | 3 | 0 | 0 | 0 | 10 | 0 |
| Chamois Niortais | 2015–16 | Ligue 2 | 12 | 0 | 3 | 1 | 0 | 0 | 15 | 1 |
| Chamois Niortais | 2016–17 | Ligue 2 | 2 | 0 | 0 | 0 | 1 | 0 | 3 | 0 |
| Chamois Niortais | 2017–18 | Ligue 2 | 15 | 0 | 3 | 0 | 0 | 0 | 18 | 0 |
| Chamois Niortais | Total | | 36 | 0 | 9 | 1 | 1 | 0 | 46 | 1 |
| Boulogne (loan) | 2016–17 | National | 5 | 0 | 2 | 0 | 0 | 0 | 7 | 0 |
| Pau | 2018–19 | National | 34 | 1 | 1 | 0 | 0 | 0 | 35 | 1 |
| Pau | 2019–20 | National | 20 | 2 | 1 | 0 | 0 | 0 | 21 | 2 |
| Pau | 2020–21 | Ligue 2 | 35 | 3 | 1 | 0 | 0 | 0 | 36 | 3 |
| Pau | 2021–22 | Ligue 2 | 33 | 1 | 0 | 0 | 0 | 0 | 33 | 1 |
| Pau | Total | | 122 | 7 | 3 | 0 | 0 | 0 | 125 | 7 |
| Career total | | | 163 | 7 | 14 | 1 | 1 | 0 | 178 | 8 |

== Honours ==
Forge FC

- Canadian Championship: 2026
