= Thibault Vialla =

French footballer (born 1996)

Personal information
- Date of birth: 7 January 1996 (age 30)
- Place of birth: Toulouse, France
- Height: 1.79 m (5 ft 10 in)
- Position: Attacking midfielder

Team information
- Current team: Toulon

Youth career
- 2007–2014: Toulouse
- 2014: Ajaccio

Senior career*
Years	Team	Apps	(Gls)
2014–2017	Ajaccio II	72	(15)
2015–2018	Ajaccio	34	(2)
2018–2019	Le Mans	15	(0)
2019–2021	Dunkerque	44	(1)
2021–2023	Red Star	28	(0)
2023–2024	Aubagne FC	25	(6)
2024–	Toulon	1	(0)
- * Club domestic league appearances and goals as of 17 August 2024

Thibault Vialla (born 7 January 1996) is a French professional footballer who plays as an attacking midfielder for Championnat National 1 club Toulon. He previously played in Ligue 2 for Ajaccio and for Dunkerque.

== Career ==
Vialla made his professional debut for AC Ajaccio in a 2–1 Ligue 2 loss to Clermont Foot on 20 March 2015. He signed his first professional contract with Ajaccio on 26 May 2017. After his contract expired in the summer of 2018, he was without a club for several months before signing for Le Mans of the Championnat National. In August 2019 he signed with Dunkerque.
