= Eddy Sylvestre =

French footballer (born 1999)

Personal information
- Full name: Eddy Elhadj Marcel Sylvestre
- Date of birth: 29 August 1999 (age 27)
- Place of birth: Aubagne, France
- Height: 1.73 m (5 ft 8 in)
- Position: Midfielder

Team information
- Current team: Farul Constanța
- Number: 10

Youth career
- 2010–2012: Aubagne
- 2012–2017: Marseille

Senior career*
Years	Team	Apps	(Gls)
2016–2017	Marseille B	13	(1)
2017–2019	Nice B	30	(2)
2018–2020	Nice	10	(0)
2019–2020	→ Auxerre (loan)	16	(2)
2019–2020	→ Auxerre B (loan)	1	(0)
2020–2022	Standard Liège	1	(0)
2021–2022	→ Pau (loan)	28	(0)
2022–2023	Pau	34	(1)
2023–2025	Grenoble	58	(4)
2025–2026	Dunkerque	17	(0)
2026–	Farul Constanța	10	(0)
- * Club domestic league appearances and goals as of 11 October 2026

Eddy Elhadj Marcel Sylvestre (Arabic: سيلفستر إيدي الحاج مارسيل; born 29 August 1999) is a French professional footballer who plays as midfielder for Liga I club Farul Constanța.

== Career ==
Sylvestre made his professional debut for Nice in a 2–0 loss to Strasbourg on 22 December 2018. He joined Auxerre on a one-year loan in 2019.

In October 2020, Sylvestre signed for Belgian club Standard Liège.

On 15 July 2021, he joined Pau on loan. He returned to Pau on a permanent basis at the end of the season. A year later, in July 2023, Sylvestre joined fellow league club Grenoble on a deal until June 2026.

On 1 September 2025, Sylvestre signed a two-year contract with Dunkerque.

In June 2026, Silvestre signed with Farul Constanța on a free.

== Career statistics ==
As of match played 11 October 2026

Appearances and goals by club, season and competition
Club	Season	League			National cup (Note: Includes Coupe de France)		Europe		Other		Total	
Club	Season	Division	Apps	Goals	Apps	Goals	Apps	Goals	Apps	Goals	Apps	Goals
Marseille B	2016–17	CFA	13	1	–		–		–		13	1
Nice B	2017–18	Championnat National 2	11	0	–		–		–		11	0
Nice B	2018–19	Championnat National 2	18	2	–		–		–		18	2
Nice B	2019–20	Championnat National 3	1	0	–		–		–		1	0
Nice B	Total		30	2	–		–		–		30	2
Nice	2018–19	Ligue 1	5	0	1	0	–		0	0	6	0
Nice	2019–20	Ligue 1	1	0	–		–		–		1	0
Nice	2020–21	Ligue 1	4	0	–		–		–		4	0
Nice	Total		10	0	1	0	–		0	0	11	0
Auxerre (loan)	2019–20	Ligue 2	16	2	0	0	–		–		16	2
Auxerre B (loan)	2019–20	Championnat National 2	1	0	–		–		–		1	0
Standard Liège	2020–21	Belgian First Division A	1	0	0	0	0	0	–		1	0
Pau (loan)	2021–22	Ligue 2	28	0	1	0	–		–		29	0
Pau	2022–23	Ligue 2	34	1	3	0	–		–		37	1
Pau	Total		62	1	4	0	–		–		66	1
Grenoble	2023–24	Ligue 2	30	0	2	0	–		–		32	0
Grenoble	2024–25	Ligue 2	25	4	2	0	–		–		27	4
Grenoble	2025–26	Ligue 2	3	0	–		–		–		3	0
Grenoble	Total		58	4	4	0	–		–		62	4
Dunkerque	2025–26	Ligue 2	17	0	1	0	–		–		18	0
Farul Constanța	2026–27	Liga I	10	0	0	0	–		–		10	0
Career total			218	10	10	0	0	0	0	0	228	10

== Honours ==
Standard Liège

- Belgian Cup runner-up: 2020–21

== Personal life ==
Born in France, Sylvestre holds French and Algerian nationalities.
