= Jovan Nišić =

Serbian footballer (born 1998)

Personal information
- Date of birth: 3 March 1998 (age 28)
- Place of birth: Belgrade, FR Yugoslavia
- Height: 1.77 m (5 ft 9 1/2 in)
- Position: Midfielder

Team information
- Current team: Lokomotiv Tashkent
- Number: 45

Youth career
- Radnički Beograd
- ŠF Premier
- 2008–2016: Partizan

Senior career*
| Years | Team | Apps | (Gls) |
| 2016–2018 | Partizan | 0 | (0) |
| 2016–2018 | → Teleoptik (loan) | 57 | (7) |
| 2018–2021 | Voždovac | 57 | (8) |
| 2021–2023 | Pau | 32 | (2) |
| 2022 | Pau II | 4 | (0) |
| 2023–2024 | Borac Banja Luka | 25 | (3) |
| 2024–2025 | Radnički Niš | 47 | (4) |
| 2026– | Lokomotiv Tashkent | 13 | (0) |

International career^{‡}
| 2014–2015 | Serbia U17 (Note: Only official UEFA matches included) | 6 | (1) |
| 2016–2017 | Serbia U19 | 6 | (1) |
| 2019–2020 | Serbia U21 | 7 | (0) |
| 2021– | Serbia | 2 | (0) |
- * Club domestic league appearances and goals as of 29 July 2026 ‡ National team caps and goals as of 6 December 2021

Jovan Nišić (Serbian Cyrillic: Јован Нишић; born 3 March 1998) is a Serbian professional footballer who plays as a midfielder for Lokomotiv Tashkent.

== Club career ==
Nišić joined Partizan as a trainee, aged 10. He signed his first professional contract with the club on 13 February 2016, penning a three-year deal. Subsequently, Nišić was assigned to their affiliated side Teleoptik. He helped the team win the Serbian League Belgrade in the 2016–17 season, thus gaining promotion to the Serbian First League. On 19 June 2018, Nišić moved to Voždovac.

At the start of the 2021–2022 campaign, Nišić joigned Pau FC in the French Ligue 2.

== International career ==
Nišić represented Serbia at both under-17 and under-19 level, but failed to qualify for any major youth tournament. He made his senior debut for Serbia in January 2021 against the Dominican Republic.

== Honours ==
Teleoptik

- Serbian League Belgrade: 2016–17

Borac Banja Luka

- Bosnian Premier League: 2023–24

Individual

- Serbian SuperLiga Player of the Week: 2024–25 (Round 16),
