= Marco Majouga =

Central African Republic footballer (born 2001)

Personal information
- Full name: Marco Ludivin Majouga
- Date of birth: 9 May 2001 (age 25)
- Place of birth: Toulouse, France
- Height: 1.82 m (6 ft 0 in)
- Position: Winger

Team information
- Current team: Mondorf-les-Bains
- Number: 99

Youth career
- 2006–2012: Toulouse-Montaudran
- 2012–2017: Toulouse
- 2017–2019: Nîmes

Senior career*
Years	Team	Apps	(Gls)
2019–2021	Nîmes B	26	(2)
2020–2021	Nîmes	7	(0)
2021–2023	Dunkerque	25	(2)
2023–2025	Botev Vratsa	55	(4)
2026–	Mondorf-les-Bains	10	(0)

International career^{‡}
2023–	Central African Republic	2	(0)
- * Club domestic league appearances and goals as of 13 June 2026 ‡ National team caps and goals as of 7 December 2024

Marco Ludivin Majouga (born 9 May 2001) is a professional footballer who plays as a winger for Luxembourgish club Mondorf-les-Bains. Born in France, he plays for the Central African Republic national team.

== Career ==
Majouga is a youth product of Toulouse-Montaudran, Toulouse and Nîmes. He made his professional debut with Nîmes in a 1–1 Ligue 1 tie with Lens on 27 September 2020. On 31 August 2021, he transferred to Dunkerque signing a 2-year contract. On 7 February 2023, he transferred to Bulgarian club Botev Vratsa.

=== International career ===
Born in France, Majouga is of Central African Republic descent. He debuted for the Central African Republic national team in a 2023 Africa Cup of Nations qualification loss to Ghana on 7 September 2023.
