= Djibril Dianessy =

French footballer (born 1996)

Personal information
- Date of birth: 29 March 1996 (age 30)
- Place of birth: Bondy, France
- Height: 1.82 m (6 ft 0 in)
- Position: Winger

Team information
- Current team: Chania

Youth career
- Toulouse

Senior career*
Years	Team	Apps	(Gls)
2014–2016	Toulouse II	41	(13)
2016–2021	Fortuna Sittard	71	(18)
2021	→ MVV (loan)	12	(3)
2021–2022	Pau	8	(1)
2023	Nõmme Kalju	11	(0)
2023–2024	RAAL La Louvière	13	(3)
2024–2025	Vardar	25	(1)
2025–	Chania	6	(0)
- * Club domestic league appearances and goals as of 2 November 2025

Djibril Dianessy (born 29 March 1996) is a French professional footballer who plays as a winger for Super League Greece 2 club Chania.

== Early life ==
Dianessy was born in Bondy, in the northeastern suburbs of Paris, to Malian parents. He acquired French nationality on 6 March 2003, through the collective effect connected to the reinstatement of his father in French nationality.

== Club career ==
On 17 June 2021, Dianessy joined Ligue 2 club Pau. On 6 January 2022, he suffered an anterior cruciate ligament injury, which made him absent for the remainder of the 2021–22 season. In July 2022, Pau decided to terminate his contract.
