= Demba Thiam (footballer, born 1989) =

French footballer

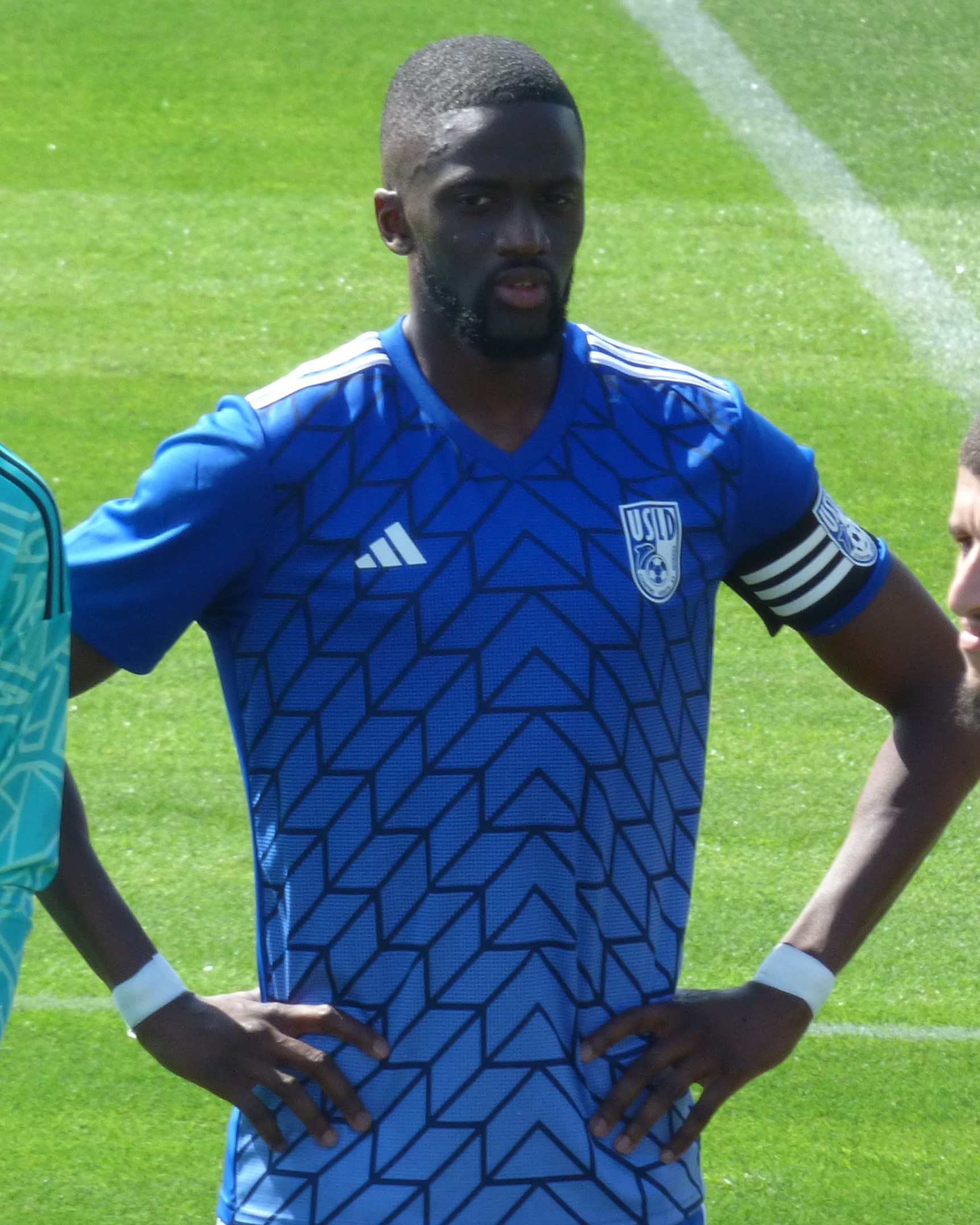
- Thiam in 2023

Personal information
- Date of birth: 2 December 1989 (age 36)
- Place of birth: Strasbourg, France
- Height: 1.79 m (5 ft 10 in)
- Position: Leftback

Team information
- Current team: Boulogne
- Number: 18

Senior career*
Years	Team	Apps	(Gls)
2009–2011	Beauvais	37	(1)
2011–2012	BX Brussels	13	(0)
2012–2013	Bertrix	26	(1)
2013–2016	Virton	88	(0)
2016	R.W.S. Bruxelles	3	(0)
2016–2018	Sedan	42	(0)
2018–2024	Dunkerque	163	(0)
2024–	Boulogne	61	(0)
- * Club domestic league appearances and goals as of 12 May 2026

Demba Thiam (born 2 December 1989) is a French footballer who plays as a leftback for Ligue 2 club Boulogne.

== Professional career ==
Thiam made his professional debut with Dunkerque in a 1-0 Ligue 2 win over Toulouse FC on 22 August 2020.

== Personal life ==
Born in France, Thiam is of Senegalese descent.
