= Adon Gomis =

Bissau-Guinean footballer (born 1992)

Personal information
- Date of birth: 19 July 1992 (age 34)
- Place of birth: Évreux, France
- Height: 1.85 m (6 ft 1 in)
- Position: Defender

Senior career*
Years	Team	Apps	(Gls)
2014–2015	Poissy	23	(18)
2015–2016	Cergy Pontoise	3	(0)
2017–2019	Les Mureaux	51	(1)
2019–2020	Laval	14	(1)
2019	Laval II	1	(0)
2020–2022	Dunkerque	49	(2)
2023	Paris 13 Atletico	7	(0)
2023–2025	Rouen	4	(0)

International career^{‡}
2022–	Guinea-Bissau	1	(0)
- * Club domestic league appearances and goals as of 26 May 2025 ‡ National team caps and goals as of 23 March 2022

Adon Gomis (born 19 July 1992) is a footballer who plays as a defender. Born in France, he plays for the Guinea-Bissau national team.

== Club career ==
Gomis made his professional debut with Dunkerque in a 1-0 Ligue 2 win over Toulouse FC on 22 August 2020.

On 28 January 2023, Gomis joined Paris 13 Atletico in Championnat National.

== International career ==
Born in France, Gomis is of Senegalese and Bissau-Guinean descent. He debuted with Guinea-Bissau in a friendly 3–0 win over Equatorial Guinea on 23 March 2022.
