= Jérémy Huysman =

French footballer (born 1988)

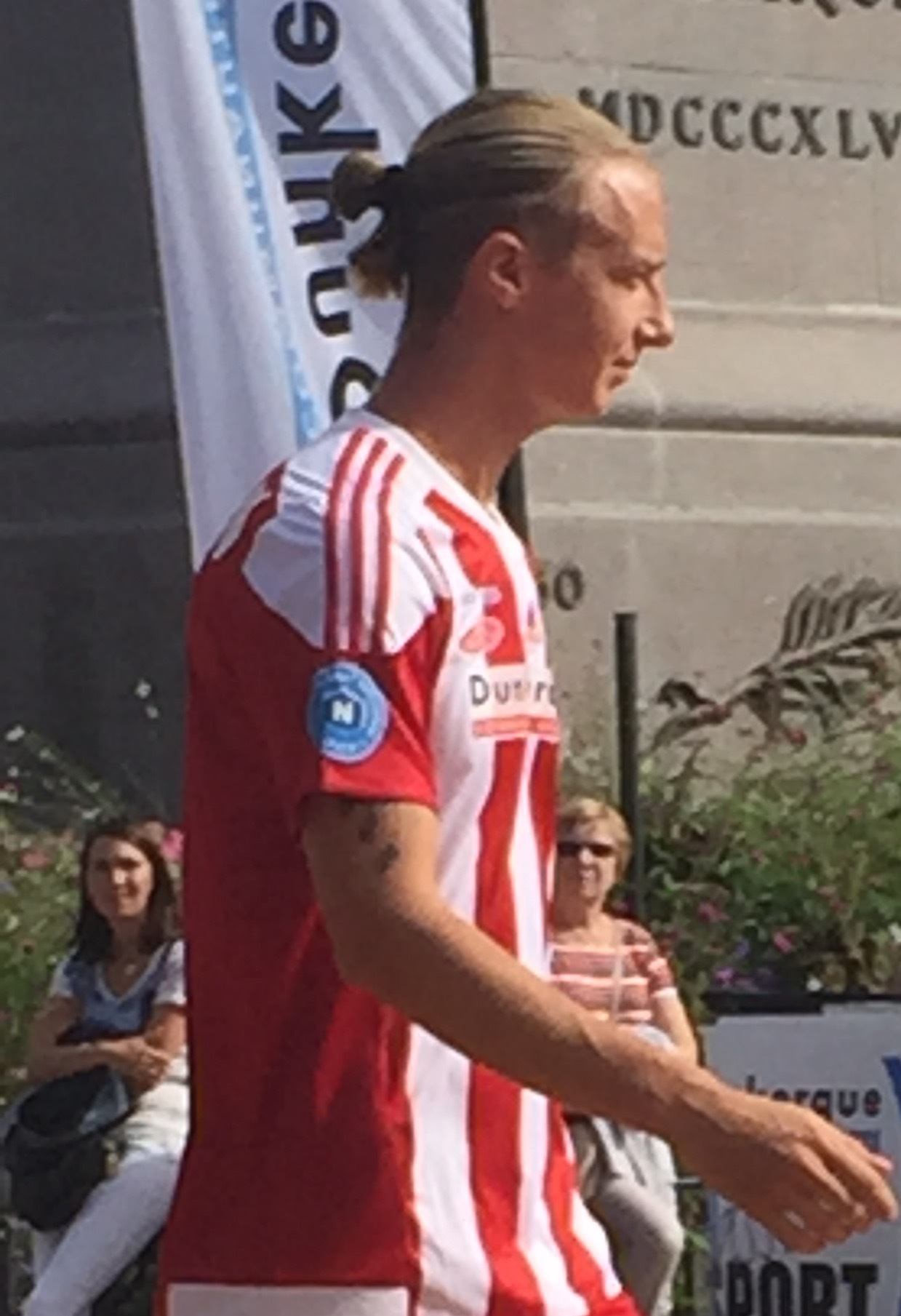
- Huysman in 2016

Personal information
- Date of birth: 8 November 1988 (age 38)
- Place of birth: Dunkirk, France
- Height: 1.88 m (6 ft 2 in)
- Position: Defensive midfielder

Senior career*
Years	Team	Apps	(Gls)
2006–2022	Dunkerque	277	(19)
2010–2011	→ Pacy Ménilles (loan)	34	(0)
- * Club domestic league appearances and goals ‡ National team caps and goals as of 14 May 2022

Jérémy Huysman (born 8 November 1988) is a French professional footballer who plays as a defensive midfielder.

== Professional career ==
Huysman has spent all but one season of his entire career at Dunkerque, and was their talismanic players as they achieved promotions into the Ligue 2. Huysman made his professional debut with Dunkerque in a 1-0 Ligue 2 win over Valenciennes FC on 19 September 2020.

== Personal life ==
Huysman is the son of the French football manager and former player Nicolas Huysman.
