= Dimitri Boudaud =

French footballer (born 1987)

Personal information
- Date of birth: February 10, 1987 (age 39)
- Place of birth: Charleville-Mézières, France
- Height: 1.73 m (5 ft 8 in)
- Position: Midfielder

Team information
- Current team: Loon-Plage

Senior career*
Years	Team	Apps	(Gls)
2004–2005	Sedan	1	(0)
2006–2008	Épernay		
2008–2009	Montceau-les-Mines	24	(1)
2009–2022	Dunkerque	231	(35)
2022–	Loon-Plage	0	(0)
- * Club domestic league appearances and goals as of 19:52, 11 September 2019 (UTC)

Dimitri Boudaud (born 10 February 1987) is a French professional footballer who plays as a midfielder for Loon-Plage.

== Career ==
Born in Charleville-Mézières, Boudaud played at professional level in Ligue 2 for CS Sedan Ardennes. Since 2009, he plays for Dunkerque.
