= Mohamed Ouadah =

French footballer (born 1994)

Personal information
- Date of birth: 31 August 1994 (age 32)
- Place of birth: Louviers, France
- Height: 1.75 m (5 ft 9 in)
- Position: Midfielder

Youth career
- 2005–2008: US Louviers
- 2008–2011: US Camon
- 2011–2014: AS Beauvais

Senior career*
Years	Team	Apps	(Gls)
2014–2019	Oissel	101	(19)
2019–2020	Bastia-Borgo	21	(3)
2020–2021	Laval	29	(8)
2021–2022	Dunkerque	29	(0)
2022–2023	Riga FC	6	(0)
2023–2025	Rouen	18	(1)
2026	Paris 13 Atletico	6	(0)
- * Club domestic league appearances and goals as of 23 June 2026

Mohamed Ouadah (born 31 August 1994) is a French professional footballer who plays as a midfielder.

== Career ==
Ouadah began his senior career with Oissel from 2014 to 2019, and followed that with stints at Bastia-Borgo and Laval. On 2 July 2021, he signed a professional contract with Dunkerque. He made his professional debut with Dunkerque in a 1–1 Ligue 2 tie with Quevilly-Rouen on 24 July 2021.

On 24 August 2022, Ouadah signed for Latvian club Riga FC. He had his contract terminated by mutual consent in July 2023.

== Personal life ==
Ouadah holds French and Algerian nationalities. His brother, Abdelali Ouadah, is also a professional footballer.
