= Harouna Sy =

French footballer (born 1996)

Personal information
- Date of birth: 30 March 1996 (age 30)
- Place of birth: Rouen, France
- Height: 1.70 m (5 ft 7 in)
- Position: Left-back

Youth career
- Rouen

Senior career*
Years	Team	Apps	(Gls)
2015–2017	Poissy	51	(0)
2017–2019	Red Star	53	(0)
2019–2020	Roeselare	13	(0)
2020–2021	Dunkerque	35	(0)
2021–2023	Amiens	24	(0)
2021–2023	Amiens B	4	(0)
2023	Volos	15	(0)
2023–2024	Estoril	1	(0)
2025	C'Chartres	3	(0)
- * Club domestic league appearances and goals as of 26 December 2025

Harouna Sy (born 30 March 1996) is a French professional footballer who plays as a left-back.

== Career ==
On 29 July 2021, Sy joined Amiens on a two-year contract.

On 13 January 2023, Sy signed for Greek Super League side Volos. On 18 May, the club announced that Sy's contract had been terminated by mutual agreement.

On 28 August 2023, Primeira Liga side Estoril announced the signing of Sy on a one-year contract.

On 28 January 2025, after over six months as a free agent, Sy joined Championnat National 3 club C'Chartres.

== Personal life ==
Harouna Sy was born in Normandy. He holds French and Senegalese nationalities and is of Mauritanian descent.
