= Axel Maraval =

French footballer (born 1993)

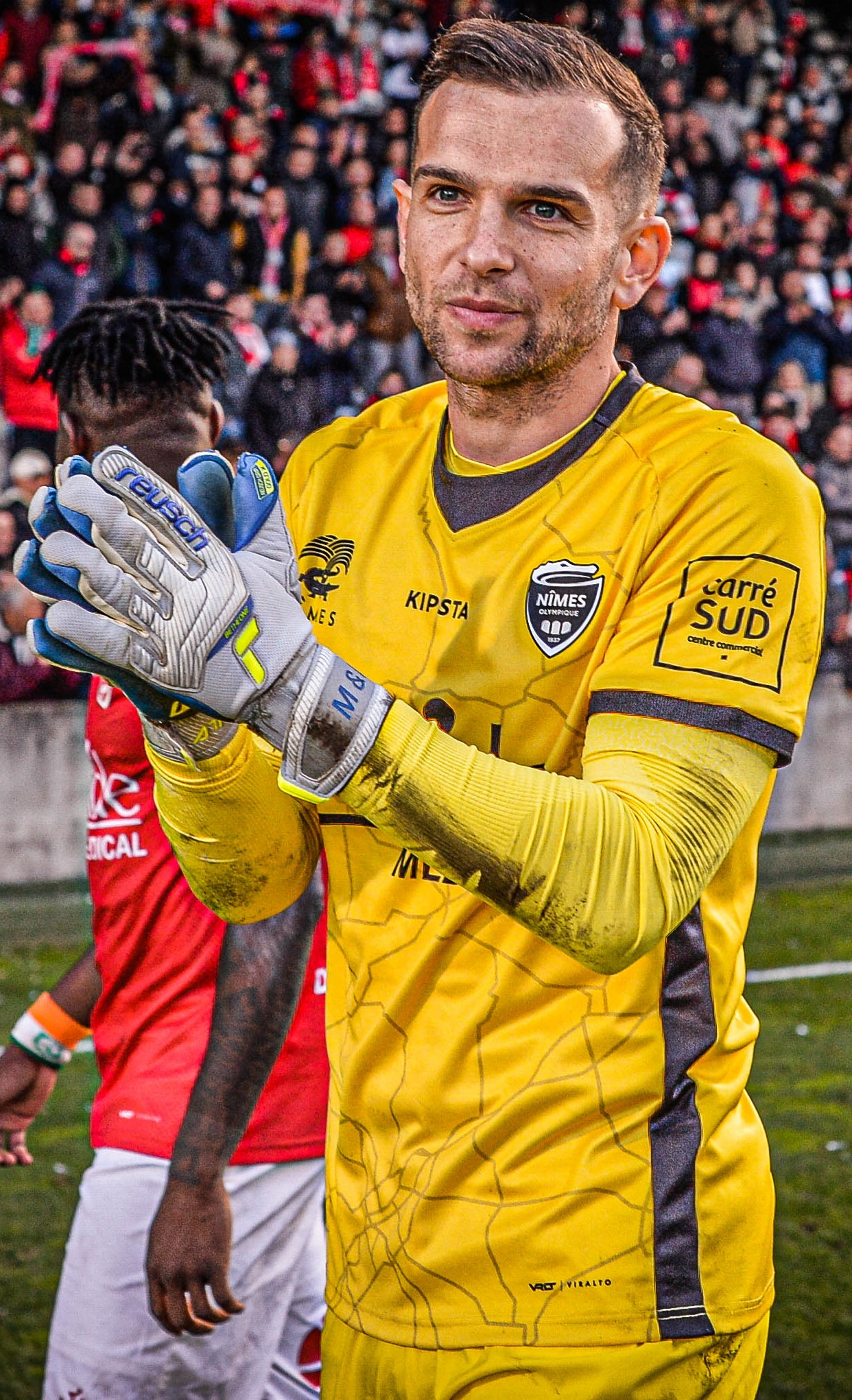
- Maraval in 2022.

Personal information
- Date of birth: 20 October 1993 (age 33)
- Place of birth: Marseille, France
- Height: 1.84 m (6 ft 0 in)
- Position: Goalkeeper

Team information
- Current team: Rouen
- Number: 1

Youth career
- 2008–2010: Monaco

Senior career*
Years	Team	Apps	(Gls)
2012–2014	Monaco	0	(0)
2012–2014	→ Monaco II	38	(0)
2014–2015	Arles-Avignon	19	(0)
2016	Domžale	21	(0)
2017–2018	Sedan	46	(0)
2018–2022	Dunkerque	109	(0)
2022–2023	Nîmes	30	(0)
2023–	Rouen	57	(0)
- * Club domestic league appearances and goals as of 16 May 2026

Axel Maraval (born 20 October 1993) is a French professional footballer who plays as a goalkeeper for Ligue 3 club Rouen.

== Club career ==
A youth product of Monaco, Maraval left the club in July 2014 to gain more playing time, signing for AC Arles-Avignon. He made his full professional debut a few months later, in a 1–0 Ligue 2 defeat against Sochaux.

On 1 February 2016, he signed for Slovenian club NK Domžale.

He returned to France with Sedan at the end of 2016, joining USL Dunkerque at the end of the 2017–18 season.

In June 2022, Maraval signed a contract with Nîmes until June 2025.
