= Emeric Dudouit =

French footballer (born 1991)

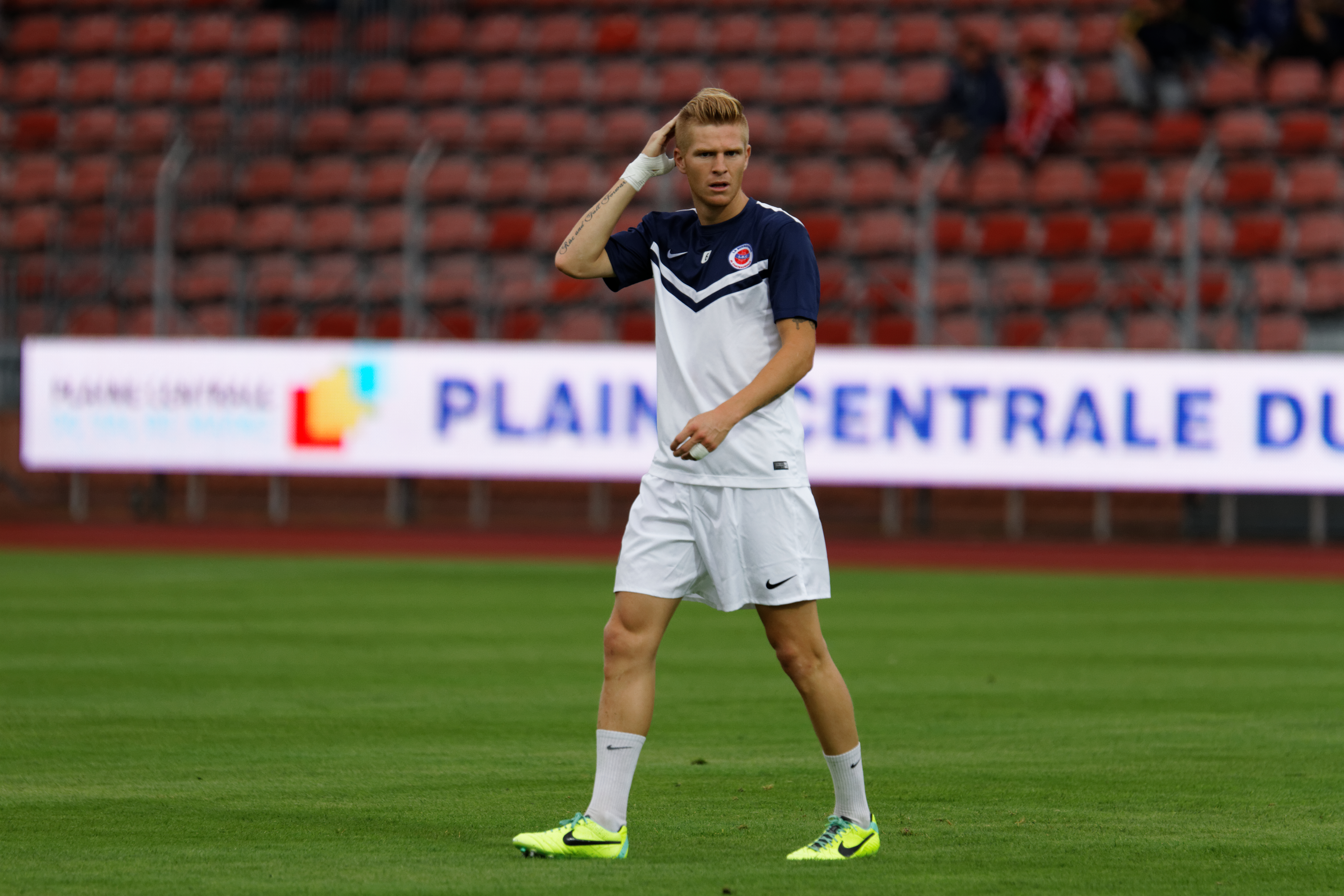
- Dudouit in 2014

Personal information
- Date of birth: 7 September 1991 (age 35)
- Place of birth: Coutances, France
- Height: 1.86 m (6 ft 1 in)
- Position: Defensive midfielder

Team information
- Current team: Avranches
- Number: 26

Youth career
- 1998-2002: ES Coutances

Senior career*
Years	Team	Apps	(Gls)
2008–2012	Caen	0	(0)
2012–2015	Châteauroux	32	(0)
2015–2016	Les Herbiers	26	(0)
2016–2018	Tubize	51	(2)
2018–2019	K Beerschot VA	8	(0)
2020–2022	Dunkerque	63	(4)
2022–2023	Versailles	1	(0)
2023	Virton	11	(2)
2023–	Avranches	40	(2)
- * Club domestic league appearances and goals as of 4 December 2025

Emeric Dudouit (born 7 September 1991) is a French professional footballer who plays as a defensive midfielder for Avranches.

Dudouit progressed through the youth system at Caen but never made a first-team appearance for the club and transferred to Châteauroux in the summer of 2012. He made his professional debut on 18 January 2013, coming on as a substitute for Yohan Hautcoeur in the 0–2 defeat to Le Mans. Dudouit went on to play 37 matches in all competitions for the club over the next two-and-a-half years before leaving at the end of the 2014–15 season. He signed for Les Herbiers in June 2015.

In June 2016, Dudoit moved to Belgium, signing a two-year deal with First Division B side Tubize. In his second season, Tubize finished bottom of the relegation playoffs, and Dudoit was one of a number of players to leave the club almost immediately, signing for divisional rivals Beerschot.

At the very end of the January 2020 transfer window, Dudoit returned to France with Dunkerque, signing a deal for the remainder of the season, with an option to extend for the following season.

In June 2022, Dudoit moved to Versailles.

== Career statistics ==
As of match played 7 February 2020

Appearances and goals by club, season and competition
Club	Season	League			National cup		League cup		Other		Total	
Club	Season	Division	Apps	Goals	Apps	Goals	Apps	Goals	Apps	Goals	Apps	Goals
Châteauroux	2012–13	Ligue 2	8	0	0	0	0	0	0	0	8	0
Châteauroux	2013–14	Ligue 2	6	0	0	0	1	0	0	0	7	0
Châteauroux	2014–15	Ligue 2	18	0	3	0	1	0	0	0	22	0
Châteauroux	Total		32	0	3	0	2	0	0	0	37	0
Les Herbiers	2015–16	Championnat National	26	0	1	0	0	0	0	0	27	0
Tubize	2016–17	Belgian First Division B	26	1	3	0	—		—		29	1
Tubize	2017–18	Belgian First Division B	25	1	1	0	—		—		26	1
Tubize	Total		51	2	4	0	—		—		55	2
Beerschot	2018–19	Belgian First Division B	0	0	0	0	—		1 (Note: Appearance in 2018–19 Belgian Europa League play-offs.)	0	1	0
Beerschot	2019–20	Belgian First Division B	8	0	1	0	—		—		9	0
Beerschot	Total		8	0	1	0	—		1	0	10	0
Dunkerque	2019–20	Championnat National	1	0	—		—		—		1	0
Career total			118	2	9	0	2	0	1	0	130	2
