= Quentin Daubin =

French footballer (born 1995)

Personal information
- Date of birth: 3 July 1995 (age 31)
- Place of birth: Saint-Nazaire, France
- Height: 1.83 m (6 ft 0 in)
- Position: Midfielder

Team information
- Current team: Pau
- Number: 25

Senior career*
Years	Team	Apps	(Gls)
2015–2018	Niort	17	(0)
2017–2018	→ Pau (loan)	29	(0)
2018–2022	Pau	121	(1)
2022–2024	Caen	68	(1)
2024–2025	Gaziantep	19	(0)
2026	Valenciennes	6	(0)
2026–	Pau	0	(0)
- * Club domestic league appearances and goals as of 23 June 2026

Quentin Daubin (born 3 July 1995) is a French professional footballer who plays as a midfielder for Ligue 2 club Pau.

== Career ==
After coming through the youth system at Chamois Niortais, Daubin was handed his senior debut on 14 November 2015 in the Coupe de France seventh round tie against ES La Rochelle. He scored his side's second goal in a 5–1 victory over the lower-league outfit. On 16 September 2016, Daubin made his first league appearance for Niort, coming on as a late substitute for Jimmy Roye in the 1–1 draw at Troyes AC. He went on to make 17 Ligue 2 appearances during the 2016–17 season.

On 22 June 2017, it was announced that Daubin had joined National 1 side Pau FC on a one-year loan. He joined the club on a permanent basis the following summer.

On 18 June 2022, Daubin signed a two-year contract with Caen.

== Career statistics ==
As of matches played 24 May 2020

Appearances and goals by club, season and competition
Club	Season	League			National cup (Note: Includes Coupe de France.)		League cup (Note: Includes Coupe de la Ligue.)		Total	
Club	Season	Division	Apps	Goals	Apps	Goals	Apps	Goals	Apps	Goals
Chamois Niortais	2015–16	Ligue 2	0	0	1	1	0	0	1	1
Chamois Niortais	2016–17	Ligue 2	17	0	3	0	0	0	20	0
Chamois Niortais	Total		17	1	4	1	0	0	21	2
Pau (loan)	2017–18	National	29	0	0	0	0	0	29	0
Pau	2018–19	National	32	1	1	0	0	0	33	1
Pau	2019–20	National	22	0	3	0	0	0	25	0
Pau	Total		54	1	4	0	0	0	58	1
Career total			100	1	8	1	0	0	108	2
