= Alioune Ba (footballer) =

French footballer (born 1989)

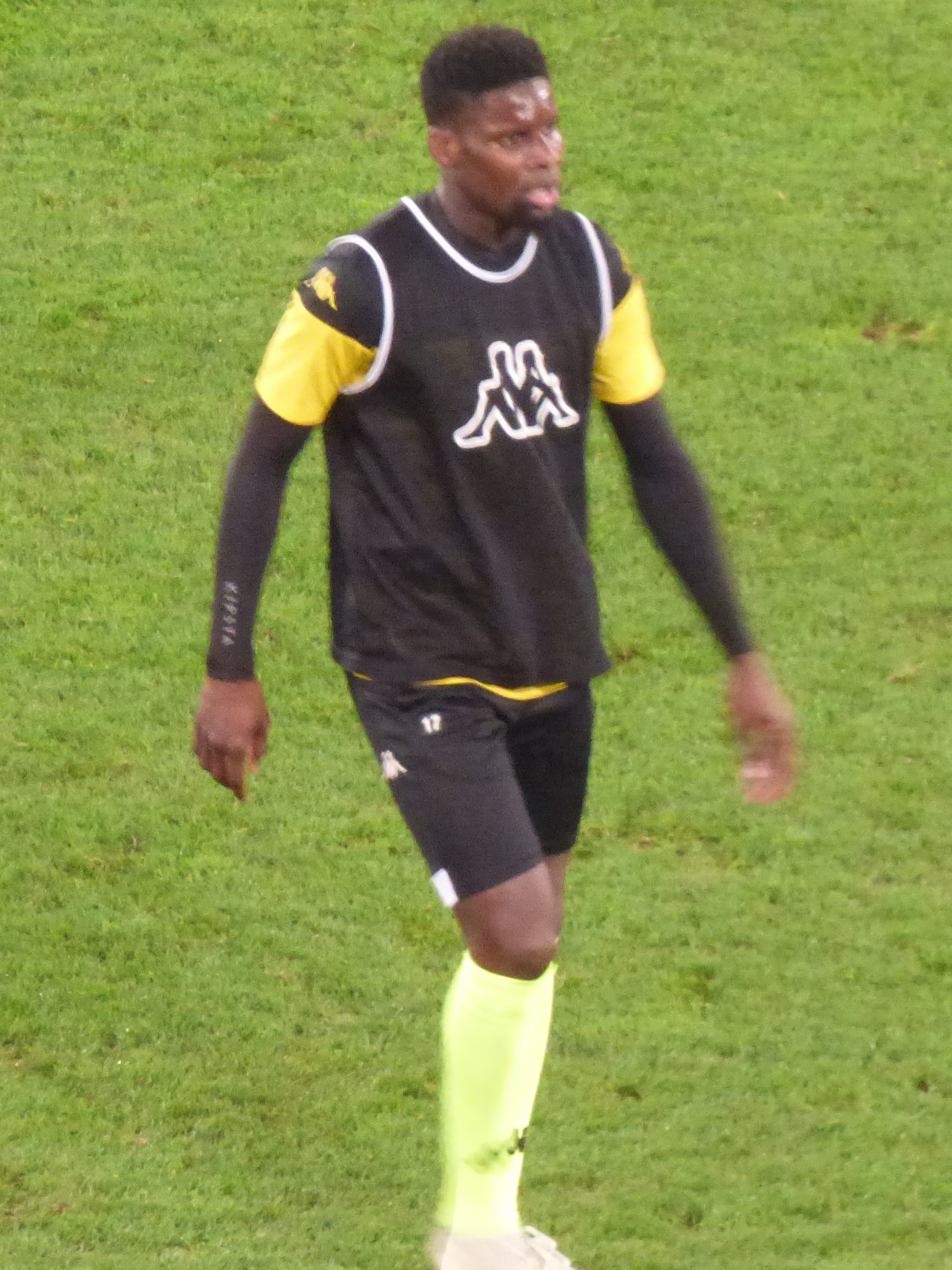
- Ba in 2020

Personal information
- Date of birth: 7 November 1989 (age 37)
- Place of birth: Courcouronnes, France
- Height: 1.89 m (6 ft 2 in)
- Position: Defender

Team information
- Current team: Dunkerque
- Number: 2

Senior career*
Years	Team	Apps	(Gls)
2010–2012	Viry-Châtillon	41	(0)
2012–2015	AC Amiens	82	(0)
2015–2016	Amiens	15	(0)
2015–2016	Amiens B	4	(0)
2016–2017	Quevilly-Rouen	28	(0)
2017–2019	Laval	52	(1)
2019–2020	Orléans B	2	(0)
2019–2020	Orléans	20	(0)
2020–2022	Dunkerque	47	(0)
2022–2024	Manisa	21	(0)
2024–	Dunkerque	11	(0)
- * Club domestic league appearances and goals as of 20 June 2024

Alioune Ba (born 7 November 1989) is a French professional footballer who plays as a defender for Ligue 2 club Dunkerque.

== Personal life ==
Born in France, Ba is of Senegalese descent.
