= Thomas Vannoye =

French footballer (born 1998)

Personal information
- Date of birth: 11 July 1998 (age 28)
- Place of birth: Dunkerque, France
- Height: 1.83 m (6 ft 0 in)
- Position: Defender

Team information
- Current team: Loon-Plage

Senior career*
Years	Team	Apps	(Gls)
2017–2019	Dunkerque B	42	(0)
2019–2023	Dunkerque	24	(0)
2023	→ Francs Borains (loan)	5	(0)
2023–	Loon-Plage	0	(0)
- * Club domestic league appearances and goals as of 20 May 2023

Thomas Vannoye (born 11 July 1998) is a French professional footballer who plays as a defender for Loon-Plage.

== Career ==
Vannoye made his professional debut with Dunkerque in a 5–0 loss to Clermont on 16 January 2021.

On 31 January 2023, Vannoye was loaned to Francs Borains in Belgium.

On 8 August 2023, Dunkerque announced Vannoye's transfer to Loon-Plage in the sixth-tier Régional 1.
