= 2020–21 Rodez AF season =

Rodez AF
2020–21 season
- Chairman: Pierre-Olivier Murat
- Manager: Laurent Peyrelade
- Stadium: Stade Paul-Lignon
- Ligue 2: 15th
- Coupe de France: Round of 64
Home colours	Away colours	Third colours

The 2020–21 Rodez AF season was the club's 118th season in existence and its second consecutive season in the second division of French football. In addition to the domestic league, Rodez participated in this season's edition of the Coupe de France. The season covered the period from 1 July 2020 to 30 June 2021.

== Players ==
=== First-team squad ===
As of 11 February 2021

Note: Flags indicate national team as defined under FIFA eligibility rules; some limited exceptions apply. Players may hold more than one non-FIFA nationality.

No.	Pos.	Nation	Player
1	GK	FRA	Théo Guivarch
2	DF	FRA	Julien Célestine
3	MF	FRA	Boris Mathis
4	DF	FRA	Pierre Bardy (captain)
5	DF	BEN	Yohan Roche
6	MF	FRA	Rémy Boissier
7	MF	FRA	Nassim Ouammou
8	MF	FRA	Pierre Ruffaut
9	FW	FRA	Malaly Dembélé
10	MF	FRA	Aurélien Tertereau
11	FW	FRA	Ugo Bonnet
13	DF	GEO	Amiran Sanaia
14	MF	FRA	Loïc Poujol
15	FW	SEN	Pape Sané
16	GK	FRA	Lionel Mpasi

No.	Pos.	Nation	Player
17	DF	FRA	Nathanaël Dieng
18	MF	FRA	Jordan Leborgne
19	DF	FRA	Alexis Peyrelade
20	FW	FRA	Alan Kerouedan
21	DF	FRA	Joris Chougrani
22	MF	FRA	David Douline
23	DF	GAB	Johann Obiang
24	MF	CMR	Alexis Alégué
25	MF	FRA	Julien Ponceau
26	FW	FRA	Ayoub Ouhafsa
27	FW	SEN	Daouda Gueye
28	MF	FRA	Valentin Henry
29	DF	FRA	Grégory Coelho
30	GK	FRA	Thomas Secchi

=== Out on loan ===
Note: Flags indicate national team as defined under FIFA eligibility rules; some limited exceptions apply. Players may hold more than one non-FIFA nationality.

No.	Pos.	Nation	Player
25	DF	FRA	Corentin Jacob (at Sporting Lyon until 30 June 2021)

== Pre-season and friendlies ==
Win Draw Loss

25 July 2020 Friendly	Rodez (France)	0–2	(France) FBBP 01	Cournon-d'Auvergne, France
18:00 CEST (UTC+2)				Stadium: Stade Joseph et Michel Gardet

1 August 2020 Friendly	Rodez (France)	1–0	(France) Clermont	Saint-Chély-d'Apcher, France
18:00 CEST (UTC+2)	Bonnet 43'			Stadium: Complexe Sportif Municipal

4 August 2020 Friendly	Nîmes (France)	1–1	(France) Rodez	Nîmes, France
17:00 CEST (UTC+2)	Bonnet 66'		Philippoteaux 49'	Stadium: Sports Complex La Bastide

5 August 2020 Friendly	Rodez (France)	1–1	(France) Villefranche	Saint-Chély-d'Apcher, France
18:00 CEST (UTC+2)	Boissier 90+1'		Pagerie 52'	Stadium: Complexe Sportif Municipal

8 August 2020 Friendly	Rodez (France)	Cancelled	(France) Toulouse	Montauban, France
19:00 CEST (UTC+2)		Report		Stadium: Stade Jean-Verbeke

12 August 2020 Friendly	Rodez (France)	2–0	(France) Pau FC	Rodez, France
19:00 CEST (UTC+2)	Sané 56'; Tertereau 61'			Stadium: Stade Paul-Lignon

14 August 2020 Friendly	Montpellier (France)	3–1	(France) Rodez	Montpellier, France
19:00 CEST (UTC+2)	Laborde 43'; Mendes 60'; Dolly 81'		Bardy 2'	Stadium: Stade de la Mosson

4 September 2020 Friendly	Grenoble (France)	0–0	(France) Rodez	France
16:00 CEST (UTC+2)

== Competitions ==
=== Overview ===
Competition	First match	Last match	Starting round	Final position	Record							
Competition	First match	Last match	Starting round	Final position	Pld	W	D	L	GF	GA	GD	Win %
Ligue 2	22 August 2020	15 May 2021	Matchday 1	15th	38	8	19	11	38	44	−6	21.05
Coupe de France	19 January 2021	10 February 2021	Eighth round	Round of 64	2	0	1	1	1	2	−1	0.00
Total					40	8	20	12	39	46	−7	20.00

Source: Soccerway

=== Ligue 2 ===
==== League table ====
Pos	Team	Pld	W	D	L	GF	GA	GD	Pts
13	Ajaccio	38	11	13	14	34	43	−9	46
14	Pau	38	11	11	16	42	49	−7	44
15	Rodez	38	8	19	11	38	44	−6	43
16	Dunkerque	38	10	11	17	34	47	−13	41
17	Caen	38	9	14	15	34	49	−15	41

Source: Ligue 2
Rules for classification: 1) Points; 2) Goal difference; 3) Number of goals scored; 4) Head-to-head goal difference; 5) Fair play points

==== Results summary ====
Overall								Home						Away					
Pld	W	D	L	GF	GA	GD	Pts	W	D	L	GF	GA	GD	W	D	L	GF	GA	GD
38	8	19	11	38	44	−6	43	6	9	4	23	20	+3	2	10	7	15	24	−9

Source: Ligue 2

==== Results by round ====
Round	1	2	3	4	5	6	7	8	9	10	11	12	13	14	15	16	17	18	19	20	21	22	23	24	25	26	27	28	29	30	31	32	33	34	35	36	37	38
Ground	H	A	H	A	H	A	H	A	H	H	A	H	A	H	A	H	A	H	A	H	A	H	A	H	A	H	A	A	H	A	H	A	H	A	H	A	H	A
Result	W	D	L	D	W	L	L	L	D	L	D	D	L	L	D	D	D	D	D	W	W	D	D	W	L	W	W	L	W	D	D	L	D	D	D	D	D	L
Position	8	5	12	12	9	12	17	17	16	18	18	18	19	19	19	20	19	18	18	18	16	16	15	14	15	14	13	15	10	11	10	13	13	12	12	12	14	15

Source: Ligue 2
A = Away; H = Home; W = Win; D = Draw; L = Loss

==== Matches ====
The league fixtures were announced on 9 July 2020.

22 August 2020 1	Rodez	1–0	Grenoble	Rodez
19:00 CEST (UTC+2)	Ouhafsa 70'	Report		Stadium: Stade Paul-Lignon; Referee: Bartolomeu Varela

29 August 2020 2	Pau	1–1	Rodez	Pau
19:00 CEST (UTC+2)	Bansais 82'	Report	Bonnet 60'	Stadium: Stade du Hameau; Referee: Benjamin Lepaysant

12 September 2020 3	Rodez	0–3	Caen	Rodez
19:00 CEST (UTC+2)		Report	Gioacchini 3'; Bammou 67'; Deminguet 89'	Stadium: Stade Paul-Lignon; Referee: Pierre Gaillouste

19 September 2020 4	Sochaux	2–2	Rodez	Montbéliard
19:00 CEST (UTC+2)	Bedia 68' (pen.); Weissbeck 84'	Report	Boissier 15', 45+2'	Stadium: Stade Auguste Bonal; Attendance: 4,970; Referee: Jérôme Brisard

26 September 2020 5	Rodez	2–1	Dunkerque	Rodez
19:00 CEST (UTC+2)	Dembélé 21'; Bonnet 82'	Report	Ketkeophomphone 50' (pen.)	Stadium: Stade Paul-Lignon; Attendance: 1,696; Referee: Remi Landry

3 October 2020 6	Clermont	3–0	Rodez	Clermont-Ferrand
19:00 CEST (UTC+2)	Magnin 5'; Allevinah 44'; Bayo 90+2'	Report		Stadium: Stade Gabriel Montpied

17 October 2020 7	Rodez	0–1	Troyes	Rodez
19:00 CEST (UTC+2)				Stadium: Stade Paul-Lignon

24 October 2020 8	Toulouse	3–0	Rodez	Toulouse
19:00 CEST (UTC+2)		Report		Stadium: Stadium de Toulouse; Referee: Bartolomeu Varela

31 October 2020 9	Rodez	2–2	Auxerre	Rodez
19:00 CET (UTC+1)	Bonnett 22'; Douline 38'; Sanaia (yellow card) 48'; Chougrani (yellow card) 56'	Report	Autret 35'; Sakhi (yellow card) 64'; Le Bihan 73' (yellow card) 90+1'	Stadium: Stade Paul-Lignon; Referee: Mehdi Mokhtari

7 November 2020 10	Rodez	0–1	Ajaccio	Rodez
19:00 CET	Bonnet (yellow card) 7'; Roche (yellow card) 36'	Report	Avinel (yellow card) 28'; Barreto (yellow card) 52'; Sainati (red card) 57'; Nouri 82'	Stadium: Stade Paul-Lignon; Referee: Nicolas Rainville

21 November 2020 11	Valenciennes	1–1	Rodez	Valenciennes
19:00 CET (UTC+1)	D'Almeida (yellow card) 12'; Guillaume 39'	Report	Douline 71'	Stadium: Stade du Hainaut; Referee: Olivier Thual

28 November 2020 12	Rodez	1–1	Guingamp	Rodez
19:00 CET (UTC+1)	Boissier (yellow card) 10'; Henry 33', (yellow card) 40'; Bardy (yellow card) 59'; Sanaia (yellow card) 69'	Report	Rodelin 52'; Valdivia (yellow card) 59'; Mellot (yellow card) 86'; Livolant (yellow card) 90'	Stadium: Stade Paul-Lignon; Referee: Benjamin Lepaysant

1 December 2020 13	Chambly	1–0	Rodez	Beauvais
19:00 CET (UTC+1)	Correa 59'; Guezoui (yellow card) 69'; Eickmayer (yellow card) 90+3'	Report	Dembélé (yellow card) 18'; Boissier (yellow card) 20'; Bardy (yellow card) 31'; Henry (yellow card) 52'; Ouammou (red card) 90+5'	Stadium: Stade Pierre Brisson; Referee: Thomas Léonard

5 December 2020 14	Rodez	1–2	Amiens	Rodez
19:00 CET (UTC+1)	Leborgne (yellow card) 19'; Bonnet 33'	Report	Odey (yellow card) 45'; Monzango (yellow card) 45+2'; Mendoza 69' (pen.), 79'	Stadium: Stade Paul-Lignon; Referee: Mehdi Mokhtari

12 December 2020 15	Paris FC	1–1	Rodez	Paris
19:00 CET (UTC+1)	Kanté (yellow card) 2'; Laura (yellow card) 57'; Abdi (yellow card) 69', (goal) 89'	Report	Boissier 4'; Dieng (yellow card) 33'; Sanaia (yellow card) 50'; Bonnet (yellow card) 83'	Stadium: Stade Sébastien Charléty; Referee: Guillaume Paradis

18 December 2020 16	Rodez	1–1	Châteauroux	Rodez
20:00 CET (UTC+1)	Henry (yellow card) 28'; Boissier (yellow card) 47', (goal) 62'	Report	Sanganté (yellow card) 9'; Cordoval (yellow card) 54'; Mulumba (yellow card) 57'; Boukari 68'	Stadium: Stade Paul-Lignon; Referee: Romain Delpech

22 December 2020 17	Le Havre	1–1	Rodez	Le Havre
20:00 CET (UTC+1)	Basque 50'	Report	Ouhafsa 80'	Stadium: Stade Océane; Referee: Sylvain Palhies

5 January 2021 18	Rodez	1–1	Niort	Rodez
20:00 CET (UTC+1)	Ouhafsa (penalty missed) 15'; Célestine (yellow card) 69'; Henry (yellow card) 75'; David 87' (pen.)	Report	Sanaia 47' (o.g.); Yongwa (yellow card) 74' (yellow-red card) 86'; Djigla (yellow card) 83'	Stadium: Stade Paul-Lignon; Referee: Olivier Thual

8 January 2021 19	Nancy	2–2	Rodez	Tomblaine
20:00 CET (UTC+1)	Coulibaly 9'; Akichi (yellow card) 36'; Triboulet 70'	Report	Boissier 26', (yellow card) 62'; Célestine (yellow card) 66'; Douline (yellow card) 79'; Coulibaly 90+1' (o.g.)	Stadium: Stade Marcel Picot

16 January 2021 20	Rodez	1–0	Pau	Rodez
19:00 CET (UTC+1)	Boissier (yellow card) 59'; Ouhafsa 66'; Sanaia (yellow card) 83'	Report	Daubin (yellow card) 40'; Bury (yellow card) 51'; Kouassi (yellow card) 70'	Stadium: Stade Paul-Lignon; Referee: Alexandre Perreau Niel

23 January 2021 21	Caen	1–2	Rodez	Caen
19:00 (CET) (UTC+1)	Mendy 27' (pen.); Deminguet (yellow card) 71'; Rivierez (yellow card) 89'	Report	Bardy 3', 18'; Leborgne (yellow card) 26'; Célestine (yellow card) 32'	Stadium: Stade Michel d'Ornano; Referee: Arnaud Baert

30 January 2021 22	Rodez	1–1	Sochaux	Rodez
19:00 CET (UTC+1)	Douline 89'	Report	Lasme (yellow card) 40'; Ourega (red card) 72'; Bedia 76'; Ambri (yellow card) 88'	Stadium: Stade Paul-Lignon; Referee: Sylvain Palhies

2 February 2021 23	Dunkerque	0–0	Rodez	Dunkerque
20:00 CET (UTC+1)		Report	Roche (yellow card) 28'; Dembélé (yellow card) 38'; Mpasi-Nzau (yellow card) 45'; David (yellow card) 77'; Poujol (yellow card) 88'	Stadium: Stade Marcel-Tribut; Referee: Romain Delpech

5 February 2021 24	Rodez	2–0	Clermont	Rodez
20:00 CET (UTC+1)	David 77'; Ruffaut 90+4'	Report	Gastien (yellow card) 76'	Stadium: Stade Paul-Lignon; Referee: Romain Lissorgue

13 February 2021 25	Troyes	2–1	Rodez	Troyes
19:00 CET (UTC+1)	Touzghar 2'; Pintor 46'; Dingomé (yellow card) 76'; Azamoum (yellow card) 80'; Giraudon (yellow card) 88'	Report	Célestine (yellow card) 29' (yellow-red card) 90+3'; Douline (yellow card) 58'; Boissier (yellow card) 62'; Dembélé 74'	Stadium: Stade de l'Aube; Referee: Mehdi Mokhtari

20 February 2021 26	Rodez	1–0	Toulouse	Rodez
19:00 CET (UTC+1)	Boissier (yellow card) 39'; Bonnet 41'; Sanaia (yellow card) 78'; Leborgne (yellow card) 82'	Report	Bayo (yellow card) 78'; Adli (yellow card) 84'; Moreira (yellow card) 90'	Stadium: Stade Paul-Lignon; Referee: Olivier Thual

27 February 2021 27	Auxerre	0–1	Rodez	Auxerre
19:00 CET (UTC+1)	Ngando (yellow card) 62'; Sakhi (yellow card) 71'; Le Bihan (yellow card) 88'	Report	Leborgne 80'	Stadium: Stade de l'Abbé-Deschamps; Referee: Benjamin Lepaysant

2 March 2021 28	Ajaccio	1–0	Rodez	Ajaccio
20:00 CET (UTC+1)	Barreto (yellow card) 57'; Bayala (yellow card) 61'; El Idrissy (yellow card) 62'; Njiké 90'	Report	Ouhafsa (yellow card) 43'; Sanaia (yellow card) 54'; Peyrelade (yellow card) 87'	Stadium: Stade François Coty; Referee: Rémi Landry

13 March 2021 29	Rodez	3–0	Valenciennes	Rodez
20:00 CET (UTC+1)	Douline (yellow card) 61'; David 66', 73' (pen.); Bonnet 69'	Report	D'Almeida (yellow card) 18'; Robail (yellow card) 46'; Pellenard (yellow card) 77'; Cuffaut (yellow card) 83'	Stadium: Stade Paul-Lignon; Referee: Mathieu Vernice

20 March 2021 30	Guingamp	1–1	Rodez	Guingamp
19:00 CET (UTC+1)	Fofana 57'; Romao (yellow card) 84'; Pierrot (yellow card) 86'	Report	Douline (yellow card) 53'; Leborgne (yellow card) 67', (goal) 82'	Stadium: Stade de Roudourou; Referee: Guillaume Paradis

3 April 2021 31	Rodez	2–2	Chambly	Rodez
20:00 CEST (UTC+2)	Bonnet 33'; El Hriti 40' (o.g.); Boissier (penalty missed) 62'; Célestine (yellow card) 70'	Report	Soubervie 13' (pen.); Delos 68'; Callegari (yellow card) 72'; Eickmayer (yellow card) 78'	Stadium: Stade Paul-Lignon; Referee: Sylvain Palhies

11 April 2021 32	Amiens	1–0	Rodez	Amiens
19:00 CEST (UTC+2)	Lusamba (yellow card) 44'; Timité (yellow card) 59', (goal) 60'; Gurtner (yellow card) 89'; Papeau (yellow card) 90+2'	Report	Douline (yellow card) 41'; Henry (yellow card) 90+1' (yellow-red card) 90+5'	Stadium: Stade de la Licorne; Referee: Abdelatif Kherradji

17 April 2021 33	Rodez	2–2	Paris FC	Rodez
20:00 CEST (UTC+2)	Boissier 5'; Mandouki 56' (o.g.); Chougrani (yellow card) 77'; Bonnet (yellow card) 79'	Report	Caddy 34'; Laura 62'	Stadium: Stade Paul-Lignon; Referee: Olivier Thual

20 April 2021 34	Châteauroux	1–1	Rodez	Châteauroux
20:00 CET (UTC+1)	Ibara (yellow card) 61'; Bonny 77'; Merdji (yellow card) 90'	Report	Boissier 71'	Stadium: Stade Gaston Petit; Referee: Mathieu Vernice

24 April 2021 35	Rodez	1–1	Le Havre	Rodez
20:00 CEST (UTC+2)	Leborgne 33', (yellow card) 87'; Henry (yellow card) 45+1'	Report	Boutaïb 81'	Stadium: Stade Paul-Lignon; Referee: Arnaud Baert

1 May 2021 36	Niort	1–1	Rodez	Niort
20:00 CET (UTC+1)	Matufueni 39'	Report	Bardy 9'; Dembélé (penalty missed) 37'	Stadium: Stade René Gaillard; Referee: Gaël Angoula

8 May 2021 37	Rodez	1–1	Nancy	Rodez
20:00 CEST (UTC+2)	Bonnet 77'; Célestine (yellow card) 81'; Boissier (yellow card) 90+1'	Report	Bassi 74'; Biron (yellow card) 81'	Stadium: Stade Paul-Lignon; Referee: Abdelatif Kherradji

15 May 2021 38	Grenoble	1–0	Rodez	Grenoble
20:00 CET (UTC+1)	Gaspar (yellow card) 11'; Bénet 77' (pen.)	Report	Roche (yellow card) 38'; Poujol (yellow card) 56'	Stadium: Stade des Alpes; Referee: Nicolas Rainville

=== Coupe de France ===
19 January 2021 Eighth round	Pau	0–0 (7–8 p)	Rodez	Pau
18:00 CET (UTC+1)		Report		Stadium: Stade du Hameau; Attendance: 0 Referee: Pierre Gaillouste
	Penalties
	Armand (penalty missed); Diatta (penalty scored); Ba (penalty scored); Koffi (penalty scored); Ndiaye (penalty scored); Daubin (penalty scored); Zahary (penalty scored); Batisse (penalty scored); Sadzoute (penalty missed)		(penalty scored) Leborgne; (penalty scored) Dieng; (penalty missed) Kerouedan; (penalty scored) David; (penalty scored) Boissier; (penalty scored) Ouhafsa; (penalty scored) Ruffaut; (penalty scored) Roche; (penalty scored) Chougrani

10 February 2021 Round of 64	Brest	2–1	Rodez	Brest
17:00 CET (UTC+1)	Mounié 34'; Le Douaron 36'; Magnetti (yellow card) 58'; Mbock (yellow card) 84'	Report	Dembélé 16'	Stadium: Stade Francis-Le Blé; Attendance: 0 Referee: Aurélien Petit

== Statistics ==
=== Goalscorers ===
As of 22 August 2020

Rank	No.	Pos	Nat	Name	Ligue 2	Coupe de France	Total
1	26	FW	(France)	Ayoub Ouhafsa	1	0	1
Totals					1	0	1
