= 2020–21 Pau FC season =

Pau FC
2020–21 season
- Chairman: Bernard Laporte-Fray
- Manager: Didier Tholot
- Stadium: Stade du Hameau
- Ligue 2: 14th
- Coupe de France: Eighth round
Home colours	Away colours	Third colours

The 2020–21 Pau FC season was the club's 101st season in existence and the first season back in the second flight of French football. In addition to the domestic league, Pau participated in this season's edition of the Coupe de France. The season covered the period from 1 July 2020 to 30 June 2021.

== Players ==
=== First-team squad ===
As of 14 February 2020.

Note: Flags indicate national team as defined under FIFA eligibility rules; some limited exceptions apply. Players may hold more than one non-FIFA nationality.

No.	Pos.	Nation	Player
1	GK	FRA	Alexis Guendouz (on loan from Saint-Étienne)
3	DF	FRA	Scotty Sadzoute (on loan from Lille)
4	DF	MLI	Alassane Diaby
5	MF	SEN	Moustapha Name
6	MF	FRA	Quentin Daubin
7	FW	SEN	Lamine Gueye
8	MF	SEN	Abdourahmane Ndiaye
10	FW	FRA	Romain Bayard
11	MF	SEN	Cheikh Tidiane Sabaly (on loan from Metz)
14	FW	GAM	Yankuba Jarju
15	FW	FRA	Steeve Beusnard
16	GK	FRA	Mathieu Iribarnegaray

No.	Pos.	Nation	Player
17	DF	FRA	Antoine Batisse
18	FW	SEN	Mor Nguer
20	DF	FRA	Louis Bury
22	MF	FRA	Lucas Laplace-Palette
23	DF	GUI	Alpha Sylla
24	DF	COM	Younn Zahary (on loan from Caen)
26	DF	FRA	Mamadou Kamissoko (on loan from Lorient)
27	DF	FRA	Damon Bansais
29	FW	FRA	Moulaye Ba
30	GK	FRA	Benjamin Bertrand
—	MF	MAR	Fawzi Ouaamar

== Pre-season and friendlies ==
Win Draw Loss Fixtures

22 July 2020 Friendly	Canet Roussillon	2–2	Pau	Roussillon, France
19:00 CEST (UTC+2)				Stadium: Stade Municipal

31 July 2020 Friendly	Toulouse	2–2	Pau	Saint-Gaudens, France
19:00 CEST (UTC+2)	Gabrielsen 14'; Zobo 75'	Report	Assifuah 44'; Jarju 72'	Stadium: Stade de Sède

8 August 2020 Friendly	Pau	0–0	Niort	Saint-Médard-en-Jalles, France
19:00 CEST (UTC+2)				Stadium: Stade Robert Monseau

12 August 2020 Friendly	Rodez	2–0	Pau	Rodez, France
19:00 CEST (UTC+2)	Sané 56'; Tertereau 61'			Stadium: Stade Paul-Lignon

15 August 2020 Friendly	US Colomiers	0–2	Pau	Tarbes, France
19:00 CEST (UTC+2)			Scaramozzino 25' (pen.); Assifuah 35'	Stadium: Stade Maurice Trélut

== Competitions ==
=== Overview ===
Competition	First match	Last match	Starting round	Final position	Record							
Competition	First match	Last match	Starting round	Final position	Pld	W	D	L	GF	GA	GD	Win %
Ligue 2	22 August 2020	15 May 2021	Matchday 1	14th	38	11	11	16	42	46	−4	28.95
Coupe de France	19 January 2021		Eighth round	Eighth round	1	0	1	0	0	0	+0	0.00
Total					39	11	12	16	42	46	−4	28.21

Source: Soccerway

=== Ligue 2 ===
==== League table ====
Pos	Team	Pld	W	D	L	GF	GA	GD	Pts
12	Le Havre	38	11	14	13	38	48	−10	47
13	Ajaccio	38	11	13	14	34	43	−9	46
14	Pau	38	11	11	16	42	49	−7	44
15	Rodez	38	8	19	11	38	44	−6	43
16	Dunkerque	38	10	11	17	34	47	−13	41

Source: Ligue 2
Rules for classification: 1) Points; 2) Goal difference; 3) Number of goals scored; 4) Head-to-head goal difference; 5) Fair play points

==== Results summary ====
Overall								Home						Away					
Pld	W	D	L	GF	GA	GD	Pts	W	D	L	GF	GA	GD	W	D	L	GF	GA	GD
38	11	11	16	42	49	−7	44	9	5	5	26	19	+7	2	6	11	16	30	−14

Source: Ligue 2

==== Results by round ====
Round	1	2	3	4	5	6	7	8	9	10	11	12	13	14	15	16	17	18	19	20	21	22	23	24	25	26	27	28	29	30	31	32	33	34	35	36	37	38
Ground	A	H	A	H	A	H	A	H	A	A	H	A	H	A	H	A	H	A	H	A	H	A	H	A	H	A	H	H	A	H	A	H	A	H	A	H	A	H
Result	L	D	L	L	D	D	L	W	L	W	L	D	W	L	D	L	L	L	L	L	L	W	W	L	D	L	W	W	D	W	D	W	D	W	D	D	L	W
Position	20	18	19	19	19	20	20	19	19	17	19	19	15	16	15	17	18	19	19	19	19	19	19	19	19	19	18	17	18	16	16	16	15	14	14	15	15	14

Source: Ligue 2
A = Away; H = Home; W = Win; D = Draw; L = Loss

==== Matches ====
The league fixtures were announced on 9 July 2020.

22 August 2020 1	Valenciennes	3–0	Pau	Valenciennes
19:00 CEST (UTC+2)	Guillaume 4'; Chevalier 13' (pen.); Cabral 57'	Report		Stadium: Stade du Hainaut; Referee: Alexandre Perreau Niel

29 August 2020 2	Pau	1–1	Rodez	Pau
19:00 CEST (UTC+2)	Bansais 82'	Report	Bonnet 60'	Stadium: Stade du Hameau; Referee: Benjamin Lepaysant

12 September 2020 3	Troyes	2–0	Pau	Troyes
19:00 CEST (UTC+2)	Suk 37' (pen.); Pintor 87'	Report		Stadium: Stade de l'Aube; Referee: Gaël Angoula

19 September 2020 4	Pau	0–1	Guingamp	Pau
19:00 CEST (UTC+2)		Report	Gomis 55'	Stadium: Stade du Hameau; Attendance: 2,742; Referee: Mehdi Mokhtari

26 September 2020 5	Amiens	0–0	Pau	Amiens
19:00 CEST (UTC+2)		Report		Stadium: Stade de la Licorne; Attendance: 4,724; Referee: Guillaume Paradis

3 October 2020 6	Pau	1–1	Nancy	Pau
19:00 CEST (UTC+2)	Bansais (yellow card) 20'; Karamoko 40' (o.g.); Jarju (yellow card) 67'; Sabaly (yellow card) 80'	Report	Akichi (red card) 31'; Lefebvre (yellow card) 52'; Barka 86'	Stadium: Stade du Hameau; Referee: Pierre Gaillouste

17 October 2020 7	Paris FC	1–0	Pau	Paris
19:00 CEST (UTC+2)	Laura (yellow card) 23'; Guilavogui (yellow card) 44'; Kikonda (yellow card) 62'; Arab 78'	Report	Kouassi (yellow card) 55'; Sabaly (yellow card) 83'	Stadium: Stade Sébastien Charléty; Referee: Abdelatif Kherradji

24 October 2020 8	Pau	4–1	Niort	Pau
19:00 CEST (UTC+2)	Lobry (yellow card) 36'; Assifuah 38'; Sabaly 45', 80'; Batisse (yellow card) 59'; Beusnard (yellow card) 75'; Armand 90+1'; Scaramozzino (penalty missed) 90+6'	Report	Doukansy 13'; Paro (red card) 20'; Michel (yellow card) 90+5'	Stadium: Stade du Hameau; Referee: Aurélien Petit

31 October 2020 9	Le Havre	1–0	Pau	Le Havre
19:00 CET (UTC+1)	Bentil 3'; Cornette (yellow card) 38'; Fontaine (yellow card) 58'	Report	Batisse (yellow card) 50' (yellow-red card) 85'; Scaramozzino (yellow card) 89'; Bayard (yellow card) 90'	Stadium: Stade Océane; Referee: Romain Delpech

7 November 2020 10	Châteauroux	0–3	Pau	Châteauroux
19:00 CEST (UTC+2)	Sanganté (yellow card) 77' (yellow-red card) 78'	Report	Assifuah 9', 40'; Daubin (yellow card) 18'; Armand 33'; Sabaly (yellow card) 45+2'; Kouassi (yellow card) 87'	Stadium: Stade Gaston Petit; Referee: Mehdi Mokhtari

21 November 2020 11	Pau	0–2	Grenoble	Pau
19:00 CET (UTC+1)	Assifuah (yellow card) 43'; Armand (yellow card) 63'; Lobry (yellow card) 76'	Report	Nestor 24'; Monfray (yellow card) 26'; Bénet 38' (pen.), (yellow card) 71'	Stadium: Stade du Hameau; Referee: Nicolas Rainville

28 November 2020 12	Dunkerque	2–2	Pau	Dunkerque
19:00 CET (UTC+1)	Tchokounté 7'; Diarra 31'	Report	Armand 24', (yellow card) 90+4'; Scaramozzino (yellow card) 87'; Bayard 90'	Stadium: Stade Marcel-Tribut; Referee: Alexandre Perreau Niel

2 December 2020 13	Pau	1–0	Caen	Pau
19:00 (CET) (UTC+1)	Armand 14'; Daubin (yellow card) 19'; Koffi (yellow card) 90'	Report	Traoré (yellow card) 13'; Beka Beka (yellow card) 88'	Stadium: Stade du Hameau; Referee: Guillaume Paradis

5 December 2020 14	Clermont	3–0	Pau	Clermont-Ferrand
19:00 CET (UTC+1)	Gomis (yellow card) 4'; Bayo 37', (penalty missed) 51', 55', (yellow card) 89'; Trichard (yellow card) 52'; Allevinah 63'	Report	Scaramozzino (red card) 49'; Daubin (yellow card) 83'	Stadium: Stade Gabriel Montpied; Referee: Gaël Angoula

15 December 2020 15	Pau	0–0	Sochaux	Pau
20:00 CET (UTC+1)	Kouassi (yellow card) 32'	Report	Bedia (yellow card) 52'	Stadium: Stade du Hameau; Referee: Sylvain Palhies

18 December 2020 16	Auxerre	2–1	Pau	Auxerre
20:00 CET (UTC+1)	Jubal 29'; Sakhi (yellow card) 33'; Dugimont 49'; Fortuné (yellow card) 72'; Coeff (yellow card) 81'	Report	Batisse 12'; Kouassi (yellow card) 26' (yellow-red card) 83'; Bayard (yellow card) 43'	Stadium: Stade de l'Abbé-Deschamps; Referee: Guillaume Paradis

22 December 2020 17	Pau	0–3	Toulouse	Pau
20:00 CET (UTC+1)	Scaramozzino (yellow card) 80'	Report	Moreira (yellow card) 22'; Healey 30'; Amian 57'; Koné 84'	Stadium: Stade du Hameau; Referee: Bartolomeu Varela Teles

5 January 2021 18	Ajaccio	4–1	Pau	Ajaccio
20:00 CET (UTC+1)	Moussiti-Oko 12'; Nouri 30' (pen.); El Idrissy 50'; Diallo 61'	Report	Sabaly 32'; Bury (yellow card) 59'; Batisse (yellow card) 82'	Stadium: Stade François Coty; Referee: Florent Batta

8 January 2021 19	Pau	1–3	Chambly	Pau
20:00 CET (UTC+1)	Scaramozzino (yellow card) 19'; Zahary 61'; Kouassi (yellow card) 64'	Report	Guezoui 5', 68'; Correa 47'	Stadium: Stade du Hameau; Referee: Aurélien Petit

16 January 2021 20	Rodez	1–0	Pau	Rodez
19:00 CET (UTC+1)	Boissier (yellow card) 59'; Ouhafsa 66'; Sanaia (yellow card) 83'	Report	Daubin (yellow card) 40'; Bury (yellow card) 51'; Kouassi (yellow card) 70'	Stadium: Stade Paul-Lignon; Referee: Alexandre Perreau Niel

23 January 2021 21	Pau	0–1	Troyes	Pau
19:00 CET (UTC+1)	Batisse (yellow card) 42'; Scaramozzino (yellow card) 79'	Report	Pintor (yellow card) 45+1'; Domingues 78'; Dembélé (yellow card) 90+3'	Stadium: Stade du Hameau; Referee: Nicolas Rainville

30 January 2021 22	Guingamp	2–3	Pau	Guingamp
19:00 CET (UTC+1)	Livolant (yellow card) 34'; Y. Gomis 55'; Roux 59'	Report	Sadzoute (yellow card) 16'; Armand 27', 36'; Lobry (yellow card) 64'; Assifuah 76'	Stadium: Stade de Roudourou; Referee: Romain Delpech

2 February 2021 23	Pau	2–0	Amiens	Pau
20:00 CET (UTC+1)	Itaitinga 10'; Kouassi (yellow card) 44'; S. Diarra (yellow card) 53'; Beusnard 67'	Report	Lomotey (yellow card) 37'; Lachuer (yellow card) 76'; Assogba (yellow card) 87'	Stadium: Stade du Hameau; Referee: Remi Landry

5 February 2021 24	Nancy	1–0	Pau	Tomblaine
20:00 CET (UTC+1)	Ciss 25'; Cissokho (yellow card) 49'; Rocha Santos (red card) 80'; El Kaoutari (yellow card) 80'; Bondo (yellow card) 82'	Report	Batisse (yellow card) 66'; Armand (yellow card) 75'; Beusnard (yellow card) 89'	Stadium: Stade Marcel Picot; Referee: Bartolomeu Varela Teles

13 February 2021 25	Pau	1–1	Paris FC	Pau
19:00 CET (UTC+1)	S. Diarra (yellow card) 13'; Beusnard (yellow card) 39'; Itaitinga 55'; Assifuah (yellow card) 71'	Report	Belaud (yellow card) 31'; López (yellow card) 50'; Abdi 82'	Stadium: Stade du Hameau; Referee: Gaël Angoula

20 February 2021 26	Niort	2–1	Pau	Niort
19:00 CET (UTC+1)	Louiserre (yellow card) 32'; Bâ 40'; Kemen 45'; Vallier (yellow card) 78'	Report	Scaramozzino (yellow card) 17'; George 59'	Stadium: Stade René Gaillard; Referee: Alexandre Perreau Niel

27 February 2021 27	Pau	2–0	Le Havre	Pau
19:00 CET (UTC+1)	Sabaly (yellow card) 55'; George 60', (yellow card) 64'; Beusnard 79'	Report	Boutaïb (yellow card) 16'	Stadium: Stade du Hameau; Referee: Sylvain Palhies

2 March 2021 28	Pau	1–0	Châteauroux	Pau
20:00 CET (UTC+1)	Daubin (yellow card) 27'; Assifuah (yellow card) 53'; Sadzoute (yellow card) 56'; George 58'	Report	Grange (yellow card) 20'; Opéri (yellow card) 43'; Ibara (yellow card) 85'	Stadium: Stade du Hameau; Referee: Arnaud Baert

13 March 2021 29	Grenoble	1–1	Pau	Grenoble
20:00 CET (UTC+1)	Djitté (yellow card) 58'; Gaspar (yellow card) 65'; Anani 66'; Bénet (yellow card) 82'	Report	Sabaly (yellow card) 55'; Armand 90+3'	Stadium: Stade des Alpes; Referee: Abdelatif Kherradji

20 March 2021 30	Pau	3–1	Dunkerque	Pau
20:00 CET (UTC+1)	Lobry 49' (pen.); Ketkeophomphone 76' (o.g.); Batisse 83'	Report	Kerrouche (yellow card) 31'; Ketkeophomphone 90'	Stadium: Stade du Hameau; Referee: Bartolomeu Varela Teles

3 April 2021 31	Caen	1–1	Pau	Caen
20:00 CEST (UTC+2)	Mendy 38'	Report	Lobry (yellow card) 42'; Riou 56' (o.g.); Batisse (yellow card) 76'	Stadium: Stade Michel d'Ornano; Referee: Gaël Angoula

10 April 2021 32	Pau	2–1	Clermont	Pau
20:00 CEST (UTC+2)	Koffi (yellow card) 7'; Batisse (yellow card) 30'; George 53'; S. Diarra (yellow card) 59'; Daubin (yellow card) 67'; Beusnard 90+1'	Report	Berthomier 30'; Ogier (yellow card) 61'; Hountondji (yellow card) 65'; Allevinah (yellow card) 80'	Stadium: Stade du Hameau; Referee: Mathieu Vernice

17 April 2021 33	Sochaux	1–1	Pau	Montbéliard
20:00 CEST (UTC+2)	Ambri 12'; Sans (yellow card) 84'; Thioune (yellow card) 87'	Report	Batisse 56'	Stadium: Stade Auguste Bonal; Referee: Abdelatif Kherradji

20 April 2021 34	Pau	3–0	Auxerre	Pau
20:00 CEST (UTC+2)	Lobry 37'; George 44', 78'; Daubin (yellow card) 48'	Report	Lloris (yellow card) 67'; Hein (yellow card) 86'	Stadium: Stade du Hameau; Referee: Romain Delpech

1 May 2021 36	Pau	0–0	Ajaccio	Pau
20:00 CEST (UTC+2)	S. Diarra (yellow card) 80'	Report	Marchetti (yellow card) 80'	Stadium: Stade du Hameau; Referee: Pierre Gaillouste

8 May 2021 37	Chambly	1–0	Pau	Chambly
20:00 CEST (UTC+2)	Correa 22' (pen.); Delos (yellow card) 81'	Report	George (yellow card) 18'; Batisse (yellow card) 21'; Beusnard (yellow card) 87'	Stadium: Stade des Marais; Referee: Bartolomeu Varela Teles

12 May 2021 35	Toulouse	2–2	Pau	Toulouse
19:00 CEST (UTC+2)	Bayo 9', 54'; Gabrielsen (yellow card) 29'; Koné (yellow card) 84'	Report	Daubin (yellow card) 22'; Koffi 46'; Dembélé (yellow card) 53'; Diarra (yellow card) 53'; Assifuah 66'	Stadium: Stadium de Toulouse; Attendance: 0 Referee: Willy Delajod

15 May 2021 38	Pau	4–3	Valenciennes	Pau
20:00 CEST (UTC+2)	Itaitinga 3'; Lobry 12'; George 16', (yellow card) 72'; Assifuah 50'; Armand (yellow card) 59'; Kouassi (yellow card) 71'	Report	Pellenard (yellow card) 30'; Vandenabeele 56', (yellow card) 63'; Dos Santos 62'; Chergui (yellow card) 72'; Haouari 84'	Stadium: Stade du Hameau; Referee: Remi Landry

=== Coupe de France ===
19 January 2021 Eighth round	Pau	0–0 (7–8 p)	Rodez	Pau
18:00 CET (UTC+1)		Report		Stadium: Stade du Hameau; Referee: Pierre Gaillouste
	Penalties
	Armand (penalty missed); Diatta (penalty scored); Ba (penalty scored); Koffi (penalty scored); Ndiaye (penalty scored); Daubin (penalty scored); Zahary (penalty scored); Batisse (penalty scored); Sadzoute (penalty missed)		(penalty scored) Leborgne; (penalty scored) Dieng; (penalty missed) Kerouedan; (penalty scored) David; (penalty scored) Boissier; (penalty scored) Ouhafsa; (penalty scored) Ruffaut; (penalty scored) Roche; (penalty scored) Chougrani

== Statistics ==
=== Goalscorers ===
As of

Rank	No.	Pos	Nat	Name	Ligue 2	Coupe de France	Total
		FW		[[]]			
Totals							
