= 2021–22 Rodez AF season =

Rodez
2021–22 season
- President: Pierre-Olivier Murat
- Head coach: Laurent Peyrelade
- Stadium: Stade Paul-Lignon
- Ligue 2: 17th
- Coupe de France: Eighth round
Home colours	Away colours	Third colours

The 2021–22 season was the 93rd season in the existence of Rodez AF and the club's third consecutive season in the second division of French football. In addition to the domestic league, Rodez participated in this season's edition of the Coupe de France.

== Players ==
=== First-team squad ===
As of 5 February 2022

Note: Flags indicate national team as defined under FIFA eligibility rules; some limited exceptions apply. Players may hold more than one non-FIFA nationality.

No.	Pos.	Nation	Player
1	GK	FRA	Marc Vidal
2	DF	FRA	Julien Célestine
4	DF	FRA	Pierre Bardy (captain)
5	MF	FRA	Enzo Zidane
6	MF	FRA	Rémy Boissier
7	MF	FRA	Nassim Ouammou
8	MF	FRA	Lorenzo Rajot
9	FW	FRA	Malaly Dembélé
10	FW	GLP	Florian David
12	FW	FRA	Kilian Corredor
13	DF	GEO	Amiran Sanaia
14	DF	FRA	Bradley Danger
15	DF	FRA	Serge-Philippe Raux-Yao
16	GK	COD	Lionel Mpasi

No.	Pos.	Nation	Player
17	MF	ANG	Plamedi Buni Jorge
18	MF	FRA	Jordan Leborgne
19	DF	FRA	Lucas Buadés
20	FW	FRA	Alan Kerouedan
21	DF	FRA	Joris Chougrani
22	MF	ISL	Árni Vilhjálmsson
23	DF	GAB	Johann Obiang
24	DF	FRA	Adilson Malanda
25	FW	FRA	Clément Depres
27	MF	FRA	Jonathan Varane (on loan from Lens)
28	FW	FRA	Jean-Pierre Tiéhi (on loan from Fulham)
29	DF	FRA	Grégory Coelho
30	GK	FRA	Thomas Secchi
33	FW	FRA	Hatim Far

=== Out on loan ===
Note: Flags indicate national team as defined under FIFA eligibility rules; some limited exceptions apply. Players may hold more than one non-FIFA nationality.

No.	Pos.	Nation	Player
—	DF	FRA	Corentin Jacob (on loan to Concarneau)

== Pre-season and friendlies ==
Win Draw Loss

3 July 2021 Friendly	Nice (France)	1–1	(France) Rodez	Nice, France
18:00 CEST (UTC+2)	Da Cunha 43'		Bonnet 54'	Stadium: Nice Training Center; Attendance: 0

10 July 2021 Friendly	Clermont (France)	2–2	(France) Rodez	Clermont-Ferrand, France
18:00 CEST (UTC+2)		Report		Stadium: Stade Philippe Marcombes; Attendance: 1,000

14 July 2021 Friendly	Montpellier (France)	1–0	(France) Rodez	Montpellier, France
18:00 CEST (UTC+2)	Wahi 45+1'			Stadium: Stade Bernard Gasset

17 July 2021 Friendly	Toulouse (France)	2–0	(France) Rodez	Montauban, France
18:00 CEST (UTC+2)				Stadium: Complexe Sportif Jean Verbeke

== Competitions ==
=== Overall record ===
Competition	First match	Last match	Starting round	Final position	Record							
Competition	First match	Last match	Starting round	Final position	Pld	W	D	L	GF	GA	GD	Win %
Ligue 2	24 July 2021	14 May 2022	Matchday 1	17th	38	10	13	15	32	42	−10	26.32
Coupe de France	13 November 2021	27 November 2021	Seventh round	Eighth round	2	1	1	0	3	2	+1	50.00
Total					40	11	14	15	35	44	−9	27.50

Source: Soccerway

=== Ligue 2 ===
==== League table ====
Pos	Team	Pld	W	D	L	GF	GA	GD	Pts	Promotion or Relegation
15	Grenoble	38	12	8	18	32	44	−12	44	
16	Valenciennes	38	10	14	14	34	47	−13	44	
17	Rodez	38	10	13	15	32	42	−10	43	
18	Quevilly-Rouen (O)	38	10	10	18	33	50	−17	40	Qualification for the relegation play-offs
19	Dunkerque (R)	38	8	7	23	28	53	−25	31	Relegation to Championnat National

Source: Ligue 2
Rules for classification: 1) Points; 2) Goal difference; 3) Number of goals scored; 4) Head-to-head goal difference; 5) Fair play points
(O) Play-off winners; (R) Relegated

==== Results summary ====
Overall								Home						Away					
Pld	W	D	L	GF	GA	GD	Pts	W	D	L	GF	GA	GD	W	D	L	GF	GA	GD
38	10	13	15	32	42	−10	43	5	9	5	16	16	0	5	4	10	16	26	−10

Source: Ligue 2

==== Results by round ====
Round	1	2	3	4	5	6	7	8	9	10	11	12	13	14	15	16	17	18	19	20	21	22	23	24	25	26	27	28	29	30	31	32	33	34	35	36	37	38
Ground	A	H	A	H	A	H	A	H	A	H	A	H	A	H	A	A	H	A	H	A	H	A	H	A	H	A	H	A	H	A	H	A	H	H	A	H	A	H
Result	L	W	D	D	W	D	W	L	L	D	L	L	W	W	L	W	W	D	D	L	L	D	D	L	D	L	L	D	D	L	D	L	L	D	L	W	W	W
Position	20	10	11	13	9	10	8	8	9	11	15	15	11	9	10	8	7	7	8	9	9	11	10	14	13	14	16	16	16	17	16	17	18	17	17	17	17	17

Source: Ligue 2
A = Away; H = Home; W = Win; D = Draw; L = Loss

==== Matches ====
The league fixtures were announced on 25 June 2021.

24 July 2021 1	Caen	4–0	Rodez	Caen
19:00 CEST (UTC+2)	Mendy 2', 19', 38' (pen.); Lepenant (yellow card) 33'; Shamal 89'	Report	Célestine (yellow card) 36'; Bardy (yellow card) 74'	Stadium: Stade Michel d'Ornano; Attendance: 7,292; Referee: Guillaume Paradis

31 July 2021 2	Rodez	1–0	Pau	Rodez
19:00 CET (UTC+1)	Leborgne (yellow card) 20' (yellow-red card) 52'; Buadés 45'	Report	Beusnard (yellow card) 55'; Batisse (yellow card) 70'; Kouassi (red card) 75'	Stadium: Stade Paul-Lignon; Referee: Remi Landry

7 August 2021 3	Dijon	1–1	Rodez	Dijon
19:00 CEST (UTC+2)	Jacob (yellow card) 40'; Scheidler 56'; Coulibaly (yellow card) 86'; Dobre (yellow card) 90+2'	Report	Dépres (yellow card) 77'; Ouammou 90+4'	Stadium: Stade Gaston Gérard; Referee: Ruddy Buquet

14 August 2021 4	Rodez	0–0	Le Havre	Rodez
19:00 CET (UTC+1)	Boissier (yellow card) 14'	Report	Touré (yellow card) 9'	Stadium: Stade Paul-Lignon; Referee: Abdelatifa Kherradji

21 August 2021 5	Valenciennes	1–4	Rodez	Valenciennes
19:00 CEST (UTC+2)	Guillaume 16'; Dos Santos (red card) 31'; Robail (yellow card) 35'; Yatabaré (yellow card) 52'	Report	Buadés 27', 47'; Leborgne (yellow card) 56'; Bardy (yellow card) 59'; Ouammou (yellow card) 66'; Dépres 73'; David 77'	Stadium: Stade du Hainaut; Referee: Benjamin Lepaysant

28 August 2021 6	Rodez	2–2	Dunkerque	Rodez
19:00 CET (UTC+1)	Célestine (yellow card) 19'; Dépres 58', (yellow card) 90+2'; Buadés 80'	Report	Tchokounté (yellow card) 19'; Bruneel 23', (yellow card) 52'; Rocheteau 66'; Maraval (yellow card) 90+2'	Stadium: Stade Paul-Lignon; Referee: Pierre Legat

11 September 2021 7	Amiens	0–1	Rodez	Amiens
19:00 CEST (UTC+2)	Lachuer (yellow card) 20'; Lusamba (yellow card) 42'	Report	Danger 34'; Dépres (yellow card) 54'; Rajot (yellow card) 74'	Stadium: Stade de la Licorne; Referee: Nicolas Rainville

18 September 2021 8	Rodez	0–2	Ajaccio	Rodez
19:00 CET (UTC+1)		Report	Moussiti-Oko 3'; Sollacaro (yellow card) 31'; Gonzalez (yellow card) 38'; Nouri 49'; Courtet (yellow card) 90+3'	Stadium: Stade Paul-Lignon; Referee: Gaël Angoula

21 September 2021 9	Auxerre	1–0	Rodez	Auxerre
20:00 CEST (UTC+2)	Charbonnier 8'	Report		Stadium: Stade de l'Abbé-Deschamps; Referee: Bartolomeu Varela

24 September 2021 10	Rodez	1–1	Grenoble	Rodez
19:00 CET (UTC+1)	M'Pasi (yellow card) 24'; David 90+4', (yellow card) 90+4'	Report	Belmonte 25' (pen.); Abdallah (yellow card) 86'	Stadium: Stade Paul-Lignon; Referee: Jérôme Miguelgorry

2 October 2021 11	Guingamp	2–1	Rodez	Guingamp
19:00 CEST (UTC+2)	Pierrot 4', (yellow card) 66'; Sivis 53'; Roux (yellow card) 55'; Diarra (yellow card) 85'	Report	Dépres 9'; Célestine (yellow card) 45+2'	Stadium: Stade de Roudourou; Referee: Pierre Legat

16 October 2021 12	Rodez	0–1	Sochaux	Rodez
19:00 CET (UTC+1)	Malanda (yellow card) 44'; Chougrani (yellow card) 55'; Danger (yellow card) 60'	Report	Mauricio 75'; Ambri (yellow card) 84'	Stadium: Stade Paul-Lignon; Referee: Olivier Thual

23 October 2021 13	Niort	0–2	Rodez	Niort
21:00 CEST (UTC+2)		Report	Chougrani (yellow card) 40'; Dembélé 45'; M'Pasi (yellow card) 89'; Bonnet 90'	Stadium: Stade René Gaillard; Referee: Alexandre Perreau Niel

30 October 2021 14	Rodez	3–0	Quevilly-Rouen	Rodez
19:00 CET (UTC+1)	Célestine (yellow card) 39'; Dembélé 50', (yellow card) 56'; Boissier 66'; Bonnet (yellow card) 70', (goal) 79'	Report	Nazon (yellow card) 37'; Sidibé (yellow card) 61'	Stadium: Stade Paul-Lignon; Referee: Abdelatifa Kherradji

6 November 2021 15	Paris FC	1–0	Rodez	Paris
19:00 CET (UTC+1)	Siby 2'; Caddy (yellow card) 33', (penalty missed) 54'	Report	Boissier (yellow card) 25'; Malanda (red card) 58'; Ouammou (yellow card) 72'	Stadium: Stade Sébastien Charléty; Referee: Mathieu Vernice

20 November 2021 16	Nancy	0–2	Rodez	Tomblaine
21:00 CEST (UTC+2)	Biron (yellow card) 58'	Report	Leborgne 24' (pen.); Chougrani 31'; Boissier (yellow card) 37'	Stadium: Stade Marcel Picot; Referee: Pierre Legat

3 December 2021 17	Rodez	1–0	Nîmes	Rodez
19:00 CET (UTC+1)	Leborgne 14' (pen.), (yellow card) 55'; Bardy (yellow card) 41'	Report	Guessoum (yellow card) 13'; Delpech (yellow card) 84'	Stadium: Stade Paul-Lignon; Referee: Guillaume Paradis

13 December 2021 18	Toulouse	1–1	Rodez	Toulouse
20:45 CET (UTC+1)	Ratão 14', (yellow card) 51'; Nicolaisen (yellow card) 69'; Evitt-Healey (yellow card) 90+3'	Report	Danger (yellow card) 36'; Célestine (yellow card) 40'; Diakité 84' (o.g.); Bardy (yellow card) 86'	Stadium: Stadium de Toulouse; Referee: Nicolas Rainville

21 December 2021 19	Rodez	0–0	Bastia	Rodez
20:45 CET (UTC+1)	Malanda (yellow card) 50'; Buadés (yellow card) 71'	Report	Vincent (yellow card) 25'; Quemper (yellow card) 54'; Kaïboué (yellow card) 74'	Stadium: Stade Paul-Lignon; Referee: Frank Schneider

8 January 2022 20	Pau	4–0	Rodez	Pau
19:00 CEST (UTC+2)	Kouassi (yellow card) 28'; Daubin (yellow card) 40'; Koffi 52'; Lobry 70'; Nišić (yellow card) 55', (goal) 60'; Naidji 76'	Report	Boissier (yellow card) 2'; Dépres (yellow card) 62'	Stadium: Nouste Camp; Referee: Bartolomeu Varela

15 January 2022 21	Rodez	0–2	Dijon	Rodez
19:00 CET (UTC+1)	Bardy (yellow card) 37' (yellow-red card) 88'; Malanda (yellow card) 43'; Célestine (yellow card) 59'	Report	Ngouyamsa (yellow card) 20'; Congré 27'; Dobre 55'	Stadium: Stade Paul-Lignon; Referee: Nicolas Rainville

22 January 2022 22	Le Havre	0–0	Rodez	Le Havre
15:00 CET (UTC+1)	Sangante (yellow card) 65'; Mayembo (yellow card) 76'; Abdelli (yellow card) 90+3'; Bonnet (yellow card) 90+6'	Report	Kerouedan (yellow card) 66'; M'Pasi (yellow card) 90+4'; David (yellow card) 90+4'	Stadium: Stade Océane; Referee: Abdelatifa Kherradji

5 February 2022 23	Rodez	0–0	Valenciennes	Rodez
19:00 CET (UTC+1)	Vilhjálmsson (yellow card) 78'; Boissier (yellow card) 79'	Report		Stadium: Stade Paul-Lignon; Referee: Olivier Thual

12 February 2022 24	Dunkerque	2–0	Rodez	Dunkirk
19:00 CET (UTC+1)	Rocheteau 21'; Trichard (yellow card) 28'; Dudouit 42'	Report	Kerouedan (yellow card) 27'; Buadés (yellow card) 43'	Stadium: Stade Marcel-Tribut; Referee: Hakim Ben El Hadj Salem

19 February 2022 25	Rodez	1–1	Amiens	Rodez
19:00 CET (UTC+1)	Vilhjalmsson 40'; Celestine (yellow card) 72'	Report	M. Fofana (b. 1998) (yellow card) 18'; Celestine 24' (o.g.); Zungu (yellow card) 33'; Lusamba (yellow card) 45'; Badji (yellow card) 45+1'; Sangaré (yellow card) 90+3'	Stadium: Stade Paul-Lignon; Referee: Arnaud Baert

26 February 2022 26	Ajaccio	2–1	Rodez	Ajaccio
19:00 CET (UTC+1)	Krasso 11', (yellow card) 75'; Marchetti (yellow card) 38'; Nouri 45+1'	Report	Vilhjálmsson 33'; Danger (yellow card) 40'; Célestine (yellow card) 61'; Bardy (yellow card) 67'	Stadium: Stade François Coty; Referee: Mathieu Vernice

5 March 2022 27	Rodez	1–3	Auxerre	Rodez
19:00 CET (UTC+1)	Boissier 75', (yellow card) 88'; Corredor (yellow card) 90'	Report	Hein 6', (yellow card) 37', (goal) 52'; Arcus 56'	Stadium: Stade Paul-Lignon; Referee: Jérôme Miguelgorry

12 March 2022 28	Grenoble	0–0	Rodez	Grenoble
19:00 CET (UTC+1)	Michel (yellow card) 87'	Report	Buadés (yellow card) 37'; M'Pasi (yellow card) 83'; Leborgne (yellow card) 85'; Malanda (yellow card) 85'; David (yellow card) 90'	Stadium: Stade des Alpes; Referee: Frank Schneider

15 March 2022 29	Rodez	1–1	Guingamp	Rodez
19:00 CET (UTC+1)	Ouammou (yellow card) 30'; Célestine (red card) 45+4'; Buadés (yellow card) 52'; Danger (yellow card) 61'; Dépres 90+5' (pen.); Malanda (red card) 90+6'	Report	Roux (yellow card) 6'; Livolant 16'; Sivis (yellow card) 19'; Merghem (yellow card) 61' (yellow-red card) 63'; Diarra (yellow card) 89'	Stadium: Stade Paul-Lignon; Referee: Arnaud Baert

19 March 2022 30	Sochaux	2–0	Rodez	Montbéliard
20:00 CET (UTC+1)	Weissbeck (yellow card) 2'; Kalulu 13'; Ndiaye 36'; Pogba (yellow card) 50'; Ndour (yellow card) 83'; Ambri (yellow card) 90+1'	Report	Bardy (yellow card) 3'; Rajot (yellow card) 7'; Chougrani (yellow card) 45'; Célestine (yellow card) 90+3'	Stadium: Stade Auguste Bonal; Referee: Bartolomeu Varela

2 April 2022 31	Rodez	1–1	Niort	Rodez
19:00 CET (UTC+1)	Chougrani 30'; Raux-Yao (yellow card) 41'	Report	M'Pasi 33' (o.g.); Kilama (yellow card) 49'	Stadium: Stade Paul-Lignon; Referee: Abdelatifa Kherradji

9 April 2022 32	Quevilly-Rouen	2–0	Rodez	Le Petit-Quevilly
19:00 CET (UTC+1)	Nazon 22', (yellow card) 62'; Gbelle 43'; Soumaré (yellow card) 64'; Boé-Kane (yellow card) 67'	Report	Boissier (yellow card) 45+1'; Obiang (yellow card) 70'; Raux-Yao (yellow card) 81'	Stadium: Stade Robert Diochon; Referee: Benoit Millot

16 April 2022 33	Rodez	0–1	Paris FC	Rodez
19:00 CEST (UTC+2)		Report	Name 11'	Stadium: Stade Paul-Lignon; Referee: Frank Schneider

19 April 2022 34	Rodez	1–1	Nancy	Rodez
20:00 CEST (UTC+2)	Corredor 48'; Célestine (yellow card) 63'	Report	N'Gbakoto 60'; Latouchent (yellow card) 66'	Stadium: Stade Paul-Lignon; Referee: Gaël Angoula

22 April 2022 35	Nîmes	3–2	Rodez	Nîmes
21:00 CEST (UTC+2)	Koné 18'; Ómarsson 36', 90+3'	Report	Malanda (yellow card) 48'; Danger 52'; Célestine 55'; Rajot (yellow card) 81'	Stadium: Stade des Costières; Referee: Mathieu Vernice

2 May 2022 36	Rodez	1–0	Toulouse	Rodez
20:45 CEST (UTC+2)	Danger 64' (pen.); Obiang (yellow card) 90+5'	Report	Bangré (yellow card) 87'	Stadium: Stade Paul-Lignon; Referee: Florent Batta

7 May 2022 37	Bastia	0–1	Rodez	Furiani
21:00 CEST (UTC+2)	Robic (yellow card) 86'	Report	Célestine (yellow card) 16'; Boissier (yellow card) 33'; Corredor 90+3'	Stadium: Stade Armand-Cesari; Referee: Pierre Legat

14 May 2022 38	Rodez	2–0	Caen	Rodez
19:00 CEST (UTC+2)	Danger (yellow card) 23'; Célestine 52'; Kerouedan 90'	Report	Abdi (yellow card) 12'	Stadium: Stade Paul-Lignon; Referee: Pierre Gaillouste

=== Coupe de France ===
13 November 2021 Seventh round	US Blavozy	1–2	Rodez	Le Puy-en-Velay
17:00 CET (UTC+1)	Pezaire 36'	Report	Chougrani 47', 65'	Stadium: Stade Charles Massot; Referee: Mickaël Leleu

27 November 2021 Eighth round	AS Cannes	1–1 (3–2 p)	Rodez	Cannes
17:00 CET (UTC+1)	Desmartin 31'	Report	David 21'	Stadium: Stade Pierre de Coubertin; Referee: Gaël Angoula
