= List of French football transfers winter 2020–21 =

This is a list of French football transfers for the 2020–21 winter transfer window. Only transfers featuring Ligue 1 and Ligue 2 are listed.

== Ligue 1 ==
Note: Flags indicate national team as has been defined under FIFA eligibility rules. Players may hold more than one non-FIFA nationality.

=== Paris Saint-Germain ===
In:

No.	Pos.	Nation	Player

Out:

No.	Pos.	Nation	Player
33	MF	FRA	Bandiougou Fadiga (on loan to Brest)
35	FW	ESP	Jesé (free agent to (Spain) Las Palmas)
—	GK	POL	Marcin Bułka (on loan to Châteauroux, previously on loan at (Spain) Cartagena)

=== Marseille ===
In:

No.	Pos.	Nation	Player
8	MF	FRA	Olivier Ntcham (on loan from (Scotland) Celtic)
19	FW	POL	Arkadiusz Milik (on loan from (Italy) Napoli)
29	DF	ESP	Pol Lirola (on loan from (Italy) Fiorentina)
31	MF	ITA	Franco Tongya (from (Italy) Juventus U23)

Out:

No.	Pos.	Nation	Player
6	MF	NED	Kevin Strootman (on loan to (Italy) Genoa)
7	FW	SRB	Nemanja Radonjić (on loan to (Germany) Hertha BSC)
8	MF	FRA	Morgan Sanson (to (England) Aston Villa)
23	FW	FRA	Marley Aké (to (Italy) Juventus U23)
29	MF	FRA	Florian Chabrolle (to Ajaccio)
36	FW	GRE	Kostas Mitroglou (to (Greece) Aris)

=== Rennes ===
In:

No.	Pos.	Nation	Player

Out:

No.	Pos.	Nation	Player
11	FW	SEN	M'Baye Niang (on loan to (Saudi Arabia) Al-Ahli)
24	DF	ITA	Daniele Rugani (loan return to (Italy) Juventus)
35	FW	FRA	Georginio Rutter (to (Germany) 1899 Hoffenheim)

=== Lille ===
In:

No.	Pos.	Nation	Player

Out:

No.	Pos.	Nation	Player
23	FW	FRA	Fadiga Ouattara (on loan to (Spain) Valencia)
25	DF	FRA	Adama Soumaoro (on loan to (Italy) Bologna)
27	MF	SEN	Cheikh Niasse (on loan to (Greece) Panathinaikos)
—	FW	BFA	Abou Ouattara (on loan to Amiens, previously on loan at (Portugal) Vitória Guimarães)

=== Nice ===
In:

No.	Pos.	Nation	Player
18	DF	FRA	William Saliba (on loan from (England) Arsenal)
25	DF	FRA	Jean-Clair Todibo (on loan from (Spain) Barcelona, previously on loan at (Portugal) Benfica)

Out:

No.	Pos.	Nation	Player
12	DF	SEN	Racine Coly (on loan to Amiens)

=== Reims ===
In:

No.	Pos.	Nation	Player

Out:

No.	Pos.	Nation	Player
17	FW	GRE	Anastasios Donis (on loan to (Netherlands) VVV-Venlo)
18	FW	SCO	Fraser Hornby (on loan to (Scotland) Aberdeen)
34	FW	FRA	Hugo Ekitike (on loan to (Denmark) Vejle)
35	MF	CMR	Moïse Sakava (on loan to (Luxembourg) Differdange)

=== Lyon ===
In:

No.	Pos.	Nation	Player
20	FW	ALG	Islam Slimani (from (England) Leicester City)

Out:

No.	Pos.	Nation	Player
4	MF	BRA	Jean Lucas (on loan to Brest)
9	FW	FRA	Moussa Dembélé (on loan to (Spain) Atlético Madrid)
—	DF	MLI	Youssouf Koné (on loan to (Turkey) Hatayspor, previously on loan at (Spain) Elche)

=== Montpellier ===
In:

No.	Pos.	Nation	Player

Out:

No.	Pos.	Nation	Player
8	DF	CMR	Ambroise Oyongo (on loan to (Russia) Krasnodar)
23	DF	FRA	Thibaut Vargas (on loan to Châteauroux)

=== Monaco ===
In:

No.	Pos.	Nation	Player
27	FW	SEN	Krépin Diatta (from (Belgium) Club Brugge)

Out:

No.	Pos.	Nation	Player
7	FW	NGA	Henry Onyekuru (on loan to (Turkey) Galatasaray)
21	DF	SRB	Strahinja Pavlović (on loan to (Belgium) Cercle Brugge)

=== Strasbourg ===
In:

No.	Pos.	Nation	Player
4	DF	FRA	Frédéric Guilbert (on loan from (England) Aston Villa)

Out:

No.	Pos.	Nation	Player
10	DF	FRA	Kenny Lala (to (Greece) Olympiacos)

=== Angers ===
In:

No.	Pos.	Nation	Player
31	FW	FRA	Yassin Fortuné (on loan from (Switzerland) Sion)

Out:

No.	Pos.	Nation	Player
31	DF	SEN	Elhadji Pape Diaw (to (Lithuania) Žalgiris)
37	MF	FRA	Kevin Bemanga (on loan to (Switzerland) Sion)
—	DF	ALG	Haithem Loucif (to (Algeria) USM Alger)

=== Bordeaux ===
In:

No.	Pos.	Nation	Player
15	MF	CIV	Jean Michaël Seri (on loan from (England) Fulham)

Out:

No.	Pos.	Nation	Player
3	DF	BRA	Pablo (to (Russia) Lokomotiv Moscow)
9	FW	NGA	Josh Maja (on loan to (England) Fulham)
40	GK	FRA	Over Mandanda (on loan to Laval)

=== Nantes ===
In:

No.	Pos.	Nation	Player

Out:

No.	Pos.	Nation	Player
8	MF	ALG	Mehdi Abeid (to (United Arab Emirates) Al-Nasr)

=== Brest ===
In:

No.	Pos.	Nation	Player
6	MF	BRA	Jean Lucas (on loan from Lyon)
29	MF	FRA	Bandiougou Fadiga (on loan from Paris Saint-Germain)

Out:

No.	Pos.	Nation	Player
11	MF	ARG	Cristian Battocchio (to (Japan) Tokushima Vortis)
25	FW	COM	Rafiki Saïd (on loan to Briochin)
29	FW	POR	Heriberto Tavares (on loan to (Portugal) Famalicão)

=== Metz ===
In:

No.	Pos.	Nation	Player
20	DF	GHA	Ernest Boahene (from (Ghana) Rainbow)

Out:

No.	Pos.	Nation	Player
1	GK	FRA	Paul Delecroix (to Annecy)
25	FW	MLI	Adama Traoré (to (Moldova) Sheriff)

=== Dijon ===
In:

No.	Pos.	Nation	Player
27	FW	FRA	Aboubakar Kamara (on loan from (England) Fulham)

Out:

No.	Pos.	Nation	Player
27	FW	FRA	Aurélien Scheidler (on loan to Nancy)

=== Saint-Étienne ===
In:

No.	Pos.	Nation	Player
6	DF	SEN	Pape Abou Cissé (on loan from (Greece) Olympiacos)
14	FW	FRA	Antony Modeste (on loan from (Germany) 1. FC Köln)
19	MF	CMR	Yvan Neyou (from (Portugal) Braga B, previously on loan)
50	GK	SEN	Boubacar Fall (from (Senegal) Guédiawaye)

Out:

No.	Pos.	Nation	Player
14	FW	CIV	Jean-Philippe Krasso (on loan to Le Mans)
16	GK	FRA	Stéphane Ruffier (retired)

=== Nîmes ===
In:

No.	Pos.	Nation	Player
27	DF	JPN	Naomichi Ueda (on loan from (Belgium) Cercle Brugge)

Out:

No.	Pos.	Nation	Player
27	FW	TOG	Kévin Denkey (to (Belgium) Cercle Brugge)

=== Lorient ===
In:

No.	Pos.	Nation	Player
4	DF	POR	Tiago Ilori (on loan from (Portugal) Sporting CP)

Out:

No.	Pos.	Nation	Player
9	FW	TUR	Umut Bozok (on loan to Troyes)

=== Lens ===
In:

No.	Pos.	Nation	Player

Out:

No.	Pos.	Nation	Player
1	GK	FRA	Didier Desprez (to Paris)
19	MF	SCO	Charles Boli (on loan to Paris)
21	FW	COL	Jader Valencia (loan return to (Colombia) Millonarios)
26	DF	SRB	Aleksandar Radovanović (to (Belgium) Kortrijk)
31	FW	BFA	Cyrille Bayala (to Ajaccio)
33	DF	SEN	Cory Sene (on loan to Annecy)
—	FW	FRA	Gaëtan Robail (on loan to Valenciennes, previously on loan at Guingamp)

== Ligue 2 ==
Note: Flags indicate national team as has been defined under FIFA eligibility rules. Players may hold more than one non-FIFA nationality.

=== Amiens ===
In:

No.	Pos.	Nation	Player
7	FW	BFA	Abou Ouattara (on loan from Lille, previously on loan at (Portugal) Vitória Guimarães)
8	DF	SEN	Racine Coly (on loan from Nice)
11	FW	FRA	Adama Diakhaby (from (England) Huddersfield Town)
18	MF	MLI	Sambou Yatabaré (free agent)

Out:

No.	Pos.	Nation	Player
3	DF	ENG	Adam Lewis (loan return to (England) Liverpool)
11	FW	COL	Juan Ferney Otero (to (Mexico) Santos Laguna)
18	DF	FRA	Sanasi Sy (to (Italy) Salernitana)
19	FW	COD	Chadrac Akolo (on loan to (Germany) Paderborn 07)
—	MF	IRN	Saman Ghoddos (to (England) Brentford, previously on loan)

=== Toulouse ===
In:

No.	Pos.	Nation	Player
8	MF	FRA	Kouadio Koné (on loan from (Germany) Borussia Mönchengladbach)
12	DF	BEL	Sébastien Dewaest (on loan from (Belgium) Genk)
22	MF	FIN	Naatan Skyttä (from (Finland) Ilves)
40	GK	SWE	Isak Pettersson (from (Sweden) Norrköping)
—	MF	FRA	Kléri Serber (from Sète 34)

Out:

No.	Pos.	Nation	Player
6	MF	FRA	Kalidou Sidibé (on loan to Châteauroux)
8	MF	FRA	Kouadio Koné (to (Germany) Borussia Mönchengladbach)
18	DF	URU	Agustín Rogel (on loan to (Argentina) Estudiantes)
32	FW	FRA	Adil Taoui (free agent)
—	MF	FRA	Kléri Serber (on loan to Sète 34)

=== Ajaccio ===
In:

No.	Pos.	Nation	Player
14	FW	BFA	Cyrille Bayala (from Lens)
26	MF	FRA	Florian Chabrolle (from Marseille)
—	FW	BFA	Jean Botué (from (Burkina Faso) USFA)

Out:

No.	Pos.	Nation	Player
33	FW	FRA	Simon Elisor (on loan to Sète 34)

=== Troyes ===
In:

No.	Pos.	Nation	Player
29	MF	FRA	Karim Azamoum (from (Spain) Albacete)
31	MF	BUL	Filip Krastev (on loan from (Belgium) Lommel, previously on loan at (Bulgaria) Slavia Sofia)
39	FW	TUR	Umut Bozok (on loan from Lorient)
—	MF	SVN	Enrik Ostrc (from (Slovenia) Olimpija Ljubljana)

Out:

No.	Pos.	Nation	Player
4	DF	FRA	Mahamadou Dembélé (on loan to Pau)
29	FW	SEN	Pape Meïssa Ba (to Red Star)
—	MF	SVN	Enrik Ostrc (on loan to (Slovenia) Olimpija Ljubljana)

=== Clermont ===
In:

No.	Pos.	Nation	Player

Out:

No.	Pos.	Nation	Player

=== Le Havre ===
In:

No.	Pos.	Nation	Player

Out:

No.	Pos.	Nation	Player
5	DF	TUR	Ertuğrul Ersoy (on loan to (Turkey) Gaziantep)
10	FW	FRA	Alan Dzabana (to Red Star)
12	DF	TUN	Ayman Ben Mohamed (on loan to (Turkey) Denizlispor)
19	DF	BFA	Yacouba Coulibaly (to (Turkey) BB Erzurumspor)

=== Valenciennes ===
In:

No.	Pos.	Nation	Player
6	MF	GEO	Jaba Kankava (from (Kazakhstan) Tobol)
9	FW	FRA	Gaëtan Robail (on loan from Lens, previously on loan at Guingamp)
29	FW	CIV	Issouf Macalou (from GOAL)

Out:

No.	Pos.	Nation	Player
8	MF	SUI	Matteo Fedele (to (Romania) Universitatea Craiova)
9	FW	FRA	Teddy Chevalier (to (Belgium) Kortrijk)
12	FW	CMR	Benjamin Moukandjo (to (Greece) AEL)

=== Guingamp ===
In:

No.	Pos.	Nation	Player

Out:

No.	Pos.	Nation	Player
8	DF	POR	Pedro Rebocho (on loan to (Portugal) Paços de Ferreira)
11	MF	FRA	Louis Carnot (on loan to Concarneau)
12	FW	COD	Yeni Ngbakoto (to (Greece) Panathinaikos)
31	FW	FRA	Gaëtan Robail (loan return to Lens)

=== Grenoble ===
In:

No.	Pos.	Nation	Player

Out:

No.	Pos.	Nation	Player

=== Chambly ===
In:

No.	Pos.	Nation	Player

Out:

No.	Pos.	Nation	Player
13	FW	GLP	Florian David (to Rodez)
20	DF	FRA	Boubacari Doucouré (on loan to (Serbia) Javor Ivanjica)
22	FW	SVN	Luka Šušnjara (to (Poland) Wisła Płock)

=== Auxerre ===
In:

No.	Pos.	Nation	Player

Out:

No.	Pos.	Nation	Player

=== Nancy ===
In:

No.	Pos.	Nation	Player
26	FW	FRA	Aurélien Scheidler (on loan from Dijon)

Out:

No.	Pos.	Nation	Player

=== Caen ===
In:

No.	Pos.	Nation	Player
16	GK	FRA	Yannis Clementia (free agent)

Out:

No.	Pos.	Nation	Player
25	MF	FRA	Godson Kyeremeh (on loan to Annecy)

=== Sochaux ===
In:

No.	Pos.	Nation	Player

Out:

No.	Pos.	Nation	Player
34	DF	FRA	Nathan Zohoré (on loan to Louhans-Cuiseaux)

=== Châteauroux ===
In:

No.	Pos.	Nation	Player
8	DF	FRA	Thibaut Vargas (on loan from Montpellier)
13	FW	CGO	Prince Ibara (on loan from (Belgium) Beerschot)
23	MF	FRA	Kalidou Sidibé (on loan from Toulouse)
40	GK	POL	Marcin Bułka (on loan from Paris Saint-Germain, previously on loan at (Spain) Cartagena)

Out:

No.	Pos.	Nation	Player

=== Rodez ===
In:

No.	Pos.	Nation	Player
2	DF	FRA	Julien Célestine (from (Latvia) Valmiera)
12	FW	GLP	Florian David (from Chambly)

Out:

No.	Pos.	Nation	Player
27	FW	SEN	Daouda Gueye (on loan to Sète 34)

=== Paris ===
In:

No.	Pos.	Nation	Player
30	GK	FRA	Didier Desprez (from Lens)
32	MF	SCO	Charles Boli (on loan from Lens)

Out:

No.	Pos.	Nation	Player
10	MF	BFA	Jonathan Pitroipa (released)
30	GK	FRA	Anthony Maisonnial (to Bourg-en-Bresse)

=== Chamois Niortais ===
In:

No.	Pos.	Nation	Player

Out:

No.	Pos.	Nation	Player

=== Pau ===
In:

No.	Pos.	Nation	Player
2	DF	FRA	Mahamadou Dembélé (on loan from Troyes)
12	FW	CRC	Mayron George (on loan from (Denmark) Midtjylland, previously on loan at (Sweden) Kalmar)
14	MF	MLI	Souleymane Diarra (free agent)
26	FW	BRA	Itaitinga (on loan from (Switzerland) Sion)

Out:

No.	Pos.	Nation	Player
14	FW	GAM	Yankuba Jarju (to Cholet)
26	DF	FRA	Mamadou Kamissoko (to (Cyprus) Nea Salamis)
27	DF	FRA	Damon Bansais (to Quevilly-Rouen)

=== Dunkerque ===
In:

No.	Pos.	Nation	Player

Out:

No.	Pos.	Nation	Player

== See also ==
- 2020–21 Ligue 1
- 2020–21 Ligue 2
