= Peyrelade =

Peyrelade may refer to:

== People ==
- Alexis Peyrelade (born 1997), French footballer
- Laurent Peyrelade (born 1970), French football manager and former player

== Other uses ==
- Château de Peyrelade, ruined castle in France
