= 2018–19 Championnat National =

Championnat National
- Season: 2018–19
- Champions: Rodez
- Promoted: Rodez; Chambly; Le Mans
- Relegated: Drancy; L'Entente SSG; Marignane Gignac; Tours
- Matches: 306
- Goals: 669 (2.19 per match)
- Top goalscorer: 15 Goals; Kévin Rocheteau, Cholet
- Biggest home win: Boulogne 4–0 Avranches; Round 8, 20 September 2018; Round 28, 29 March 2019; Avranches 5–1 L'Entente; Round 30, 12 April 2019; Rodez 5–1 Lyon-Duchère; Round 34, 17 May 2019
- Biggest away win: Dunkerque 1–4 Bourg-en-Bresse; Round 26, 15 March 2019; Concarneau 0–3 Chambly; Round 31, 19 April 2019; L'Entente 1–4 Pau; Round 33, 9 May 2019
- Highest scoring: 7 goals (Concarneau 4–3 Villefranche; Round 8, 21 September 2018; Laval 4–3 Drancy; Round 20, 1 February 2019; Quevilly-Rouen 4–3 Laval; Round 34, 17 May 2019)

The 2018–19 Championnat National season was the 21st season since the establishment of the Championnat National, which serves as the third division of the French football league system.

== Team changes ==
=== To National ===
Promoted from National 2

- Marignane-Gignac
- Villefranche
- Drancy
- Le Mans

Relegated from Ligue 2

- Bourg-Péronnas
- Quevilly-Rouen
- Tours

=== From National ===
Relegated to National 2

- Les Herbiers
- Marseille Consolat
- Créteil

Promoted to Ligue 2

- Red Star
- Béziers
- Grenoble

=== Stadia and locations ===
Location of teams in 2018–19 National

Club	Location	Venue	Capacity
Avranches	Avranches	Stade René Fenouillère	2,000
Boulogne	Boulogne-sur-Mer	Stade de la Libération	15,204
Bourg-Péronnas	Bourg-en-Bresse	Stade Marcel-Verchère	11,400
Chambly	Chambly	Stade des Marais	2,500
Cholet	Cholet	Stade Pierre Blouen	9,000
Concarneau	Concarneau	Stade Guy Piriou	6,500
Drancy	Drancy	Stade Charles Sage	2,500
Dunkerque	Dunkirk	Stade Marcel-Tribut	4,200
Laval	Laval	Stade Francis Le Basser	18,607
L'Entente	Saint-Gratien	Parc des Sports Michel Hidalgo	8,000
Le Mans	Le Mans	MMArena	25,000
Lyon-Duchère	Lyon	Stade de Balmont	5,438
Marignane-Gignac	Marignane	Stade Saint-Exupéry	1,900
Pau	Pau	Stade du Hameau	13,819
Quevilly-Rouen	Le Petit-Quevilly	Stade Robert Diochon	12,018
Rodez	Rodez	Stade Paul Lignon	5,955
Tours	Tours	Stade de la Vallée du Cher	16,247
Villefranche	Villefranche-sur-Saône	Stade Armand-Chouffet	3,200

== League table ==
Pos	Team	Pld	W	D	L	GF	GA	GD	Pts	Promotion or Relegation
1	Rodez (C, P)	34	23	7	4	54	21	+33	76	Promotion to Ligue 2
2	Chambly (P)	34	18	8	8	48	31	+17	62	Promotion to Ligue 2
3	Le Mans (O, P)	34	16	11	7	38	29	+9	59	Qualification to promotion play-offs
4	Laval	34	16	6	12	51	43	+8	54	
5	Lyon-Duchère	34	13	11	10	43	42	+1	50	
6	Boulogne	34	12	13	9	38	33	+5	49	
7	Cholet	34	11	13	10	41	38	+3	46	
8	Avranches	34	12	9	13	37	40	−3	45	
9	Quevilly-Rouen	34	11	12	11	37	37	0	45	
10	Pau (Note: Pau were penalised for fielding a suspended player, Vincent Thill, in the home match against Bourg-Péronnas on 29 March 2018. The original scoreline was 4–0, with Thill scoring the first goal. Bourg-Péronnas were awarded a 3–0 victory and Pau deducted a penalty point.)	34	13	6	15	41	38	+3	44	
11	Dunkerque	34	11	10	13	37	39	−2	43	
12	Villefranche	34	8	18	8	34	34	0	42	
13	Concarneau	34	10	10	14	30	43	−13	40	
14	Bourg-Péronnas	34	10	9	15	35	38	−3	39	
15	Tours (R)	34	7	16	11	21	29	−8	37	2019-20 CFA 2
16	Marignane-Gignac (R)	34	8	10	16	31	43	−12	34	Relegation to Championnat National 2
17	L'Entente SSG (R)	34	5	14	15	27	46	−19	29	Relegation to Championnat National 2
18	Drancy (R)	34	5	11	18	21	40	−19	26	Relegation to Championnat National 2

Source: FFF.fr
Rules for classification: 1) points; 2) goal difference; 3) number of goals scored; 4) head-to-head goal difference; 5) fair play points
(C) Champions; (O) Play-off winners; (P) Promoted; (R) Relegated

== Promotion play-offs ==
A promotion play-off was held at the end of the season between the 18th-placed Ligue 2 team and 3rd-placed team of the 2018–19 Championnat National. This was played over two legs on 28 May and 2 June.

28 May 2019
20:45 CEST

Le Mans	1–2	Gazélec Ajaccio
Boissier 53'	Report	Blayac 14'; Jobello 48'

MMArena, Le Mans
Attendance: 22,800
Referee: François Letexier

2 June 2019
20:45 CEST

Gazélec Ajaccio	0–2	Le Mans
	Report	Boissier 73'; Mamadou 90+7'

Stade Ange Casanova, Ajaccio
Attendance: 3,500
Referee: Mikael Lesage

Le Mans won 3–2 on aggregate and were promoted to Ligue 2, while Gazélec Ajaccio were relegated to the Championnat National.

== Top scorers ==
As of matches played 17 May 2019.

Rank	Player	Club	Goals
1	(France) Kévin Rocheteau	Cholet	15
2	(France) Robert Maah	Boulogne	14
3	(France) Joris Correa	Chambly	13
4	(Luxembourg) Vincent Thill	Pau	12
4	(France) Mayingila N'Zuzi Mata	Dunkerque	12
6	(Guadeloupe) Florian David	Rodez	11
7	(France) Vincent Créhin	Le Mans	10
7	(France) Jordan Pierre-Charles	Bourg-Péronnas	10
9	(France) Ugo Bonnet	Rodez	9
9	(France) Madih Talal	L'Entente SSG	9
9	(Cameroon) Paul Garita	Dunkerque	9

== Attendances ==
#	Club	Average
1	Le Mans	5,853
2	Stade lavallois	4,317
3	Rodez	3,213
4	Boulogne	2,908
5	FBBP	2,263
6	Tours	1,969
7	Concarneau	1,917
8	Quevilly-Rouen	1,684
9	Chambly	1,071
10	Dunkerque	1,040
11	Villefranche	890
12	Avranches	886
13	Cholet	800
14	Pau	786
15	Entente	533
16	MGCB	517
17	Drancy	340
18	Lyon-La Duchère	273
