= Sidy Diagne =

Footballer (born 2002)

Personal information
- Full name: Sidy Mamadou Aubin Diagne
- Date of birth: 11 January 2002 (age 24)
- Place of birth: Montbéliard, France
- Height: 1.83 m (6 ft 0 in)
- Position: Defender

Team information
- Current team: Andrézieux
- Number: 25

Youth career
- 2006–2010: Sous-Roches - Valentigney
- 2010–2021: Sochaux

Senior career*
| Years | Team | Apps | (Gls) |
| 2019–2021 | Sochaux B | 21 | (0) |
| 2021–2022 | Sochaux | 2 | (0) |
| 2022–2023 | Angers B | 28 | (1) |
| 2023–2024 | Sochaux B | 15 | (1) |
| 2023–2024 | Sochaux | 3 | (0) |
| 2024–2025 | Haguenau | 22 | (1) |
| 2025– | Andrézieux | 17 | (1) |

International career
| 2019 | Switzerland U18 | 1 | (0) |
- * Club domestic league appearances and goals as of 6 February 2026

Sidy Mamadou Aubin Diagne (born 11 January 2002) is a professional footballer who plays as a defender for Championnat National 1 club Andrézieux. Born in France, he is a former Switzerland youth international.

== Club career ==
Diagne is a product of the youth academies of Sous-Roches Valentigney and Sochaux. He began his senior career with the reserves of Sochaux in 2019. He made his professional debut with Sochaux in a 2–0 Ligue 2 win over Paris FC on 18 September 2021.

== International career ==
Born in France, Diagne is of Senegalese and Swiss descent. Diagne was called up for a training camp with the France U16s in August 2017. He represented the Switzerland U18s in 2019.
