= Mickaël Latour =

French footballer (born 1995)

Personal information
- Full name: Mickaël Mathieu Latour
- Date of birth: 16 September 1995 (age 31)
- Place of birth: Rueil-Malmaison, France
- Height: 1.75 m (5 ft 9 in)
- Position: Winger

Team information
- Current team: Andrézieux
- Number: 10

Youth career
- 2001–2009: Racing Paris
- 2009–2014: Paris Saint-Germain

Senior career*
Years	Team	Apps	(Gls)
2014–2015	Virtus Entella	3	(0)
2016–2017	Espanyol B	16	(0)
2018–2019	US Lusitanos	24	(12)
2019–2021	Chambly	1	(0)
2019–2020	Chambly B	11	(0)
2021–2023	US Lusitanos	50	(9)
2023–2025	Granville	53	(9)
2025–	Andrézieux	17	(4)
- * Club domestic league appearances and goals as of 6 February 2026

Mickaël Mathieu Latour (born 16 September 1995) is a French professional footballer who plays as a winger for Championnat National 1 club Andrézieux.

== Club career ==
Latour represented Paris Saint-Germain as a youth before joining Serie B club Virtus Entella on 28 July 2014. He made his debut for the club on 16 August, playing the entire second half in a 2–2 Coppa Italia home draw against Benevento.

Latour made his debut in the second division on 8 November 2014, coming on as a late substitute for Francesco Belli in a 1–2 away loss against Perugia. He only appeared in four matches for Virtus, all from the bench, and was subsequently released in the end of the season.

On 1 February 2016, Latour signed an 18-month contract with RCD Espanyol, being assigned to the reserves in Segunda División B.
