= Loïc Poujol =

French footballer (born 1989)

Personal information
- Full name: Loïc Gabriel Poujol
- Date of birth: 27 February 1989 (age 37)
- Place of birth: Rodez, France
- Height: 1.88 m (6 ft 2 in)
- Position: Midfielder

Youth career
- 2004–2009: Sochaux

Senior career*
Years	Team	Apps	(Gls)
2009–2014	Sochaux	69	(3)
2010–2014	Sochaux B	43	(2)
2014–2016	Paris FC	35	(0)
2015–2016	Paris FC B	6	(0)
2016–2021	Rodez	86	(5)
2020	Rodez B	1	(0)

International career
2010	France U20	5	(0)
- * Club domestic league appearances and goals as of 14:33, 19 May 2021 (UTC)

Loïc Poujol (born 27 September 1989) is a French former professional footballer. He played as a midfielder for Sochaux, Paris FC and Rodez AF.

== Career ==
Poujol was born in Rodez. He made his professional debut for FC Sochaux-Montbéliard on 8 August 2009 in a Ligue 1 game against AJ Auxerre. After a five-year spell with Sochaux in the top-flight league, he signed a two-year contract with the Championnat National side Paris FC on 3 July 2014.

Following release from Paris FC, Poujol signed an initial one-year contract with Rodez AF on 29 September 2016. He stayed at the club for five seasons, and was involved in promotions from Championnat de France Amateur in 2017 and Championnat National in 2019. He announced his retirement on 17 May 2021.

== Career statistics ==
As of match played 15 May 2021

Appearances and goals by club, season and competition
Club	Season	League			National Cup		League Cup		Other		Total	
Club	Season	Division	Apps	Goals	Apps	Goals	Apps	Goals	Apps	Goals	Apps	Goals
Sochaux	2009–10	Ligue 1	16	0	1	0	0	0	—		17	0
Sochaux	2010–11	Ligue 1	7	0	2	0	0	0	—		9	0
Sochaux	2011–12	Ligue 1	19	1	1	0	0	0	0	0	20	1
Sochaux	2012–13	Ligue 1	23	2	1	0	1	0	—		25	2
Sochaux	2013–14	Ligue 1	4	0	0	0	1	0	—		5	0
Sochaux	Total		69	3	5	0	2	0	0	0	76	3
Sochaux II	2010–11	CFA	20	1	—		—		0	0	20	1
Sochaux II	2011–12	CFA	4	1	—		—		—		4	1
Sochaux II	2012–13	CFA	5	0	—		—		—		5	0
Sochaux II	2013–14	CFA	14	0	—		—		—		14	0
Sochaux II	Total		43	2	—		—		0	0	43	2
Paris FC	2014–15	National	30	0	0	0	—		—		30	0
Paris FC	2015–16	Ligue 2	5	0	0	0	1	0	—		6	0
Paris FC	Total		35	0	0	0	1	0	0	0	36	0
Paris FC II	2015–16	CFA 2	6	0	—		—		—		6	0
Rodez	2016–17	CFA	21	1	1	0	—		—		22	1
Rodez	2017–18	National	21	2	2	1	—		—		23	3
Rodez	2018–19	National	24	2	2	0	—		—		26	2
Rodez	2019–20	Ligue 2	12	0	2	0	1	0	—		15	0
Rodez	2020–21	Ligue 2	8	0	2	0	—		—		10	0
Rodez	Total		86	5	9	1	1	0	0	0	96	6
Rodez B	2020–21	National 3	1	0	—		—		—		1	0
Career total			240	10	14	1	4	0	0	0	258	7
