= Yassine Haouari =

French footballer (born 2003)

Personal information
- Date of birth: 13 February 2003 (age 23)
- Place of birth: Lille, France
- Height: 1.82 m (6 ft 0 in)
- Position: Forward

Team information
- Current team: Feignies Aulnoye
- Number: 19

Youth career
- –2021: Valenciennes

Senior career*
Years	Team	Apps	(Gls)
2021–2025	Valenciennes	13	(2)
2021–2025	Valenciennes B	67	(20)
2025–	Feignies Aulnoye	0	(0)
- * Club domestic league appearances and goals as of 26 May 2025

Yassine Haouari (born 13 February 2003) is a French professional footballer who plays as a forward for Championnat National 1 club Feignies Aulnoye.

== Career ==
On 15 May 2021, Haouari made his professional debut for Valenciennes in a 4–3 Ligue 2 loss to Pau. He scored the final goal of the match, a lob from 40 meters away from the goal.

== Personal life ==
Born in France, Haouari holds French and Algerian nationalities.
