= Julien Célestine =

French footballer (born 1997)

- Célestine in 2026

Personal information
- Full name: Julien Albert Marc Célestine
- Date of birth: 24 July 1997 (age 29)
- Place of birth: Paris, France
- Height: 1.91 m (6 ft 3 in)
- Position: Defender

Team information
- Current team: Jeju SK
- Number: 3

Youth career
- 2001–2007: Rachais
- 2007–2011: Grenoble
- 2011–2013: Bastia
- 2013–2015: Béziers
- 2015–2016: Toulouse
- 2016–2018: Charleroi

Senior career*
Years	Team	Apps	(Gls)
2018–2019	RWDM	19	(0)
2019–2020	URSL Visé	17	(1)
2020–2021	Valmiera FC	25	(1)
2021–2022	Rodez	48	(2)
2022	León	4	(0)
2023	Diósgyőr	0	(0)
2023–2024	Concarneau	30	(0)
2024–2025	Apollon Limassol	12	(0)
2025–2026	Arka Gdynia	14	(1)
2026–	Jeju SK	13	(1)
- * Club domestic league appearances and goals as of 12:45, 13 May 2026 (UTC)

Julien Albert Marc Célestine (born 24 July 1997) is a French professional footballer who plays as a defender for K League 1 club Jeju SK.

== Career ==
Célestine began his football training at the academies of Rachais, Grenoble, Bastia, Béziers, and Toulouse before moving to Belgium with Charleroi in 2016. Célestine began his senior football career with the amateur Belgian clubs RWDM and URSL Visé.

In 2020, he signed with the Latvian club Valmiera FC, and then returned to France with Rodez on 2 January 2021. Célestine made his professional debut with Rodez in a 1–1 Ligue 2 tie with Niort on 5 January 2021.

On 18 July 2022, Célestine joined Liga MX side León, before joining Hungarian Nemzeti Bajnokság I side Diósgyőri VTK on 23 June 2023.

On 1 September 2023, Célestine returned to France, signing a one-year contract with Concarneau as a free agent.

In the summer of 2024, he moved to Cypriot side Apollon Limassol, where he made 13 appearances in all competitions. On 19 February 2025, he joined Polish second-tier club Arka Gdynia as a free agent.

On 23 January 2026, Célestine signed with Korean club Jeju SK.

== Personal life ==
Born in France, Célestine is of Italian descent. Célestine's brother, Enzo Célestine, is also a professional footballer.

== Career statistics ==
As of match played 29 September 2025

Appearances and goals by club, season and competition
Club	Season	League			National cup (Note: Includes Belgian Cup, Latvian Cup, Coupe de France, Cypriot Cup, Polish Cup)		Continental		Total	
Club	Season	Division	Apps	Goals	Apps	Goals	Apps	Goals	Apps	Goals
RWDM	2018–19	Belgian National Division 3	19	0	1	0	0	0	20	0
Visé	2019–20	Belgian National Division 3	17	1	0	0	0	0	17	1
Valmiera	2020	Latvian Higher League	25	1	2	0	1 (Note: Appearance in UEFA Europa League)	0	28	1
Rodez	2020–21	Ligue 2	17	0	0	0	0	0	17	0
Rodez	2021–22	Ligue 2	31	2	1	0	0	0	32	2
Rodez	Total		47	2	1	0	0	0	48	2
León	2022–23	Liga MX	4	0	0	0	0	0	4	0
Diósgyőr	2023–24	Nemzeti Bajnokság I	0	0	—		—		0	0
Concarneau	2023–24	Ligue 2	30	0	0	0	0	0	30	0
Apollon Limassol	2024–25	Cypriot First Division	12	0	1	0	—		13	0
Arka Gdynia	2024–25	I liga	6	1	—		—		6	1
Arka Gdynia	2025–26	Ekstraklasa	8	0	1	0	—		9	0
Arka Gdynia	Total		14	1	1	0	—		15	1
Career total			169	5	6	0	1	0	176	5

== Honours ==
Arka Gdynia

- I liga: 2024–25
