= Steeve Beusnard =

French footballer (born 1992)

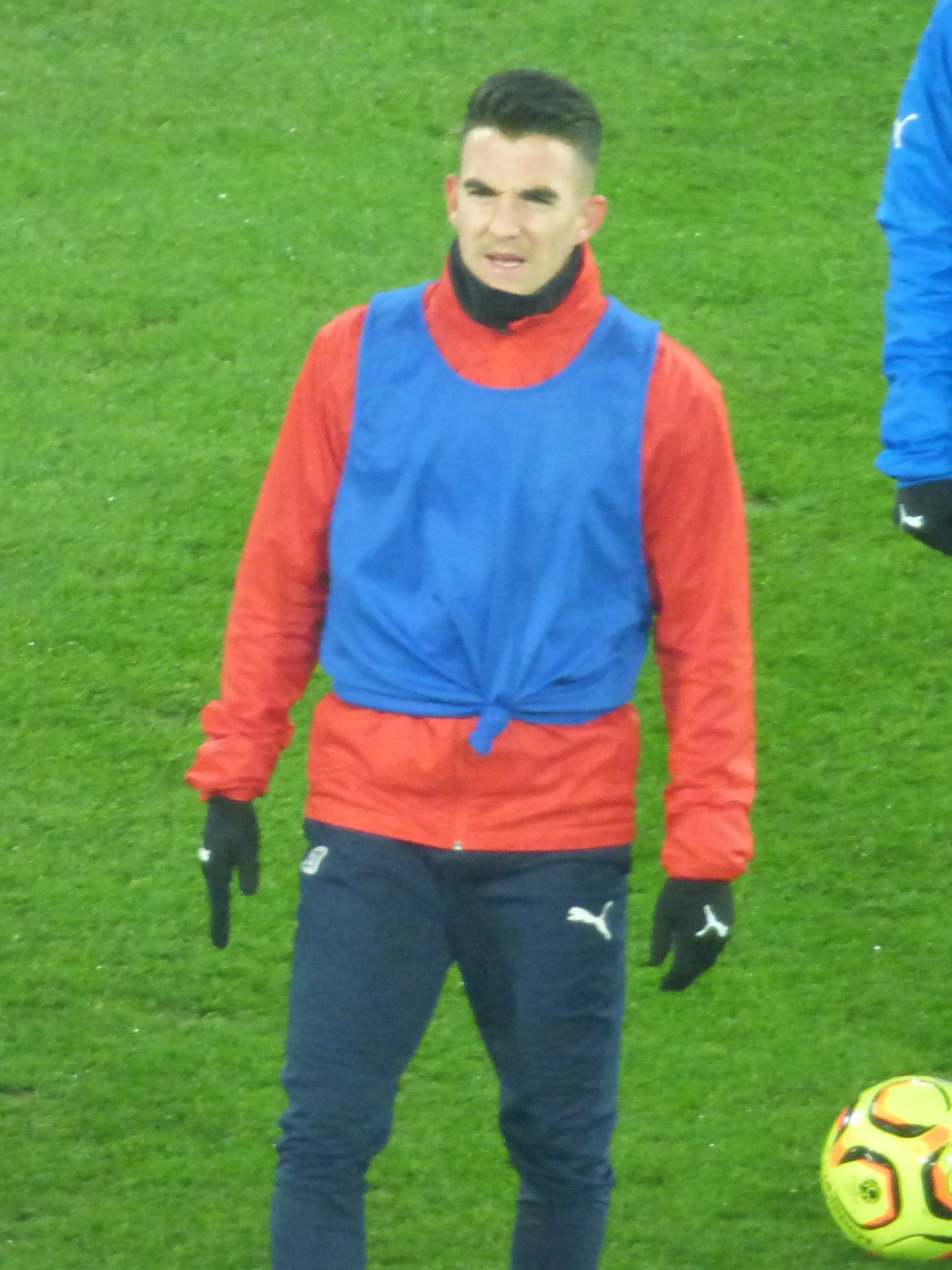
- Beusnard in 2019

Personal information
- Date of birth: 27 June 1992 (age 34)
- Place of birth: Lattes, France
- Height: 1.70 m (5 ft 7 in)
- Position: Midfielder

Team information
- Current team: Turan Tovuz

Youth career
- 2003–2008: Montpellier
- 2008–2009: AS Lattes
- 2009–2010: Canet
- 2010–2012: AS Lattes
- 2012–2014: AS Fabrègues

Senior career*
Years	Team	Apps	(Gls)
2014–2016	AS Fabrègues	43	(12)
2016–2019	Béziers	72	(7)
2019	Gazélec Ajaccio	10	(0)
2020–2026	Pau	169	(10)
2026–	Turan Tovuz	0	(0)
- * Club domestic league appearances and goals as of 11 May 2026

Steeve Beusnard (born 27 June 1992) is a French professional footballer who plays as a midfielder for Azerbaijani Premier League club Turan Tovuz.

== Club career ==
After joining the youth academy of Montpellier HSC, Beusnard was not retained due to his late physical development. Beusnard then began his career in the Regional Leagues, playing for several clubs in the Montpellier area. As an amateur, Beusnard worked in the construction industry, specifically in carpentry.

=== AS Béziers ===
Beusnard joined Béziers when they won promotion to Ligue 2 in the 2017–18 season. Beusnard made his professional debut during the 2018-19 season with Béziers, in a 2-0 victory against AS Nancy in Ligue 2 on 27 July 2018. Beusnard went on to play 29 Ligue 2 matches under the management of Mathieu Chabert.

Beusnard quickly became a fan favorite at the Parc des Sports de Sauclières.

However, the club was relegated at the end of the 2018–19 Ligue 2 season.

=== Gazélec Ajaccio ===
In July 2019, Beusnard left Béziers and signed with Gazélec Ajaccio.

In December 2019, due to injuries and personal issues, he mutually agreed to terminate his contract with Gazélec Ajaccio and subsequently joined Pau FC.

=== Pau FC ===
With Pau FC, he helped the team finish at the top of the 2019–20 Championnat National, earning promotion to Ligue 2. Unfortunately, Beusnard suffered a serious injury after hitting the post during a top-of-the-table match against USL Dunkerque (2-0).

During the 2020–21 Ligue 2 season, which marked the club's first-ever professional campaign, Beusnard initially struggled, as did his teammates. However, the second half of the season was much stronger, and the club managed to secure a miraculous survival.

The following season, the versatile midfielder solidified his role as a defensive midfielder, a position where Didier Tholot had repositioned him. In October 2021, Beusnard suffered another injury, tearing the ligaments in his right knee, following a similar injury to his left knee in February 2020. His recovery was further complicated by a staph infection.

In June 2022, Beusnard extended his contract for another two years, despite his serious injury.

During the 2022–23 Ligue 2 season, Beusnard established himself as a key player in Didier Tholot's midfield, alongside Henri Saivet and Sessi d'Almeida. The defensive midfielder managed to regain exceptional physical condition, playing in numerous matches with significant playing time. Despite a slight dip in performance in January, he was one of the standout players of the 2022–23 season, alongside Henri Saivet.

=== Turan Tovuz ===
On 21 July 2026, Beusnard signed a two-year contract with Turan Tovuz in Azerbaijan.

== Personal life ==
Steeve Beusnard has a twin brother, Brayan, with whom he played at Fabrègues and Lattes.

== Career statistics ==
As of match played on 2 June 2023

Club statistics
Club	Season	League			National Cup		Other		Total	
Club	Season	Division	Apps	Goals	Apps	Goals	Apps	Goals	Apps	Goals
Béziers	2016–17	Championnat National	23	5	1	0	—		24	5
Béziers	2017–18	Championnat National	20	2	0	0	—		20	2
Béziers	2018–19	Ligue 2	29	0	1	0	—		30	0
Béziers	Totals		72	7	2	0	0	0	74	7
Gazélec Ajaccio	2019–20	Championnat National	10	0	2	1	—		12	1
Pau	2019–20	Championnat National	5	0	0	0	—		5	0
Pau	2020–21	Ligue 2	32	3	0	0	—		32	3
Pau	2021–22	Ligue 2	9	0	0	0	—		9	0
Pau	2022–23	Ligue 2	37	2	3	0	—		40	2
Pau	Totals		83	5	3	0	0	0	86	5
Career totals			160	12	7	1	0	0	167	13
