= Thomas Secchi =

French footballer (born 1997)

Personal information
- Date of birth: 19 June 1997 (age 29)
- Place of birth: Paris, France
- Height: 1.85 m (6 ft 1 in)
- Position: Goalkeeper

Youth career
- Rodez

Senior career*
Years	Team	Apps	(Gls)
2015–2023	Rodez II	45	(0)
2020–2023	Rodez	6	(0)
2023–2024	Cholet	17	(0)
- * Club domestic league appearances and goals as of 16 June 2024

Thomas Secchi (born 19 June 1997) is a French professional footballer who plays as a goalkeeper.

== Career ==
Secchi joined the youth academy of Rodez in 2013, and is their long-term backup and reserve goalkeeper. He made his first appearance with the club in a Championnat National 2 match in 2016. He made his professional debut with Rodez 5 years later in a 1–0 Ligue 2 loss to Grenoble on 15 May 2021.
