= Didier Desprez =

French association football player (born 1999)

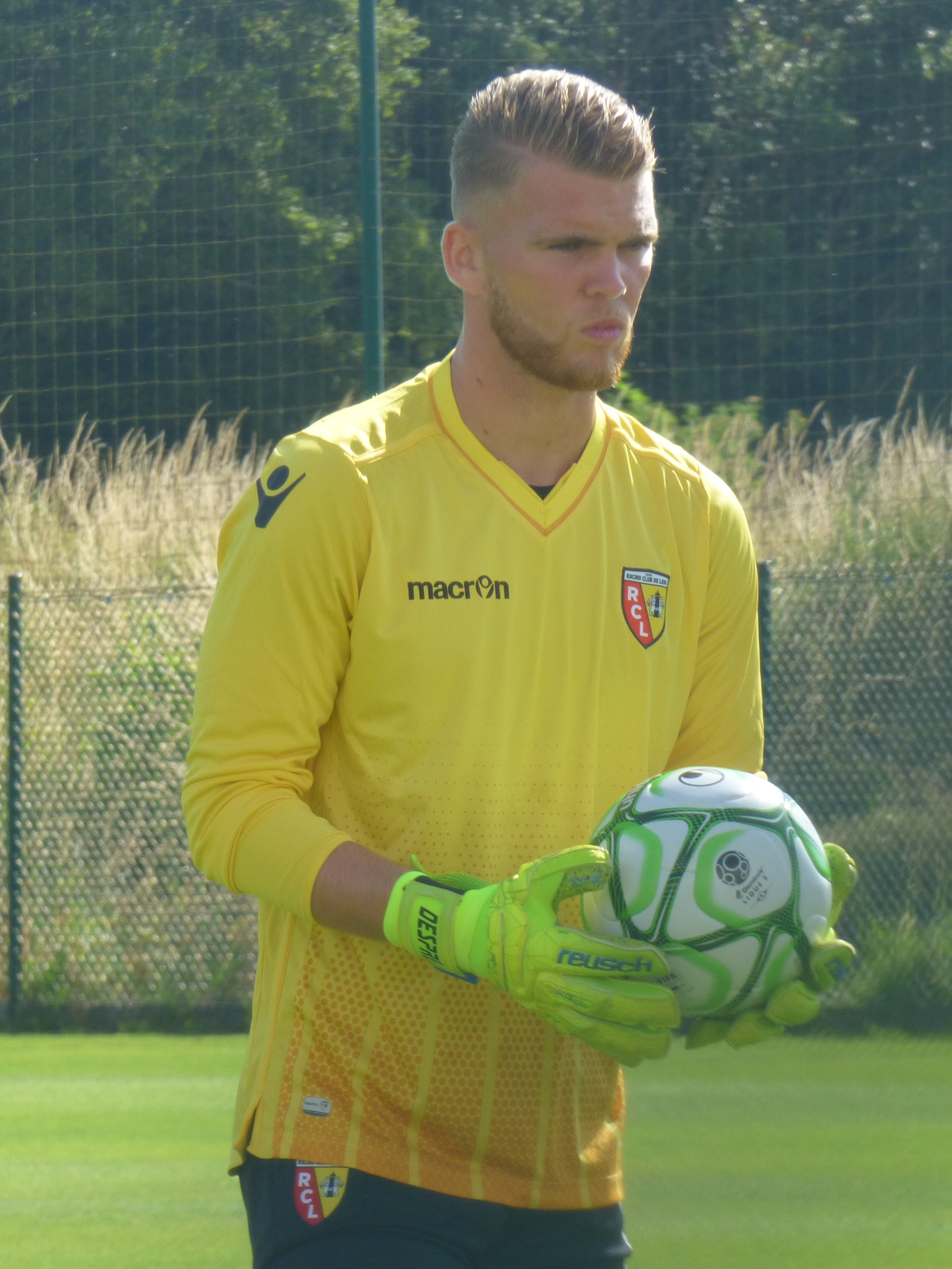
- Desprez in 2019

Personal information
- Full name: Didier Pierre Jean-Paul Desprez
- Date of birth: 13 March 1999 (age 27)
- Place of birth: Lille, France
- Height: 1.89 m (6 ft 2 in)
- Position: Goalkeeper

Team information
- Current team: FC Rouen
- Number: 30

Youth career
- 2006–2012: Villeneuve-d'Ascq
- 2012–2015: Lens

Senior career*
Years	Team	Apps	(Gls)
2015–2021	Lens B	54	(0)
2019–2021	Lens	0	(0)
2018–2019	→ Drancy (loan)	25	(0)
2021	Paris FC	2	(0)
2021–2023	Charleroi	0	(0)
2022–2023	→ Paris 13 Atletico (loan)	5	(0)
2023–2026	F91 Dudelange	49	(0)
2026	Bula FC	17	(0)
2026–	FC Rouen	0	(0)

International career
2014–2015	France U16	5	(0)
2015–2016	France U17	3	(0)
2017–2018	France U18	1	(0)
2018–2019	France U19	1	(0)
2018–2019	France U20	2	(0)
- * Club domestic league appearances and goals as of 26 June 2025

Didier Pierre Jean-Paul Desprez (born 13 March 1999) is a French professional footballer who plays as goalkeeper for Ligue 3 club FC Rouen.

== Club career ==
On 2 June 2017, Desprez signed his first professional contract with Lens. He joined Drancy on loan for the 2018–19 season in the Championnat National. He made his professional debut with Lens in a 2–1 Coupe de la Ligue win over Troyes on 13 August 2019.

On 31 August 2021, he signed a two-year contract with Charleroi in Belgium. On 13 July 2022, Desprez joined Paris 13 Atletico in Championnat National on loan.

On 11 July 2023, Desprez signed a contract with F91 Dudelange in Luxembourg. He got his debut on 12 July 2023, in a first qualifying round of the UEFA Europa Conference League game against St Patrick's Athletic.

In 2026, following the creation of the OFC Professional League, the player signed with Fiji club Bula FC as one of the foreign players making up the team's squad.
