= Pierre Ruffaut =

French footballer (born 1987)

Personal information
- Date of birth: 17 June 1987 (age 39)
- Place of birth: Vichy, France
- Height: 1.82 m (6 ft 0 in)
- Position: Midfielder

Team information
- Current team: Onet-le-Château

Youth career
- 2003–2004: Vichy
- 2004–2008: Cournon
- 2008–2010: Vichy

Senior career*
Years	Team	Apps	(Gls)
2010–2016	Moulins	106	(21)
2016–2021	Rodez	138	(12)
2021–2022	Cholet	22	(3)
2022–2023	Andrézieux	27	(2)
2023–	Onet-le-Château	21	(4)
- * Club domestic league appearances and goals as of 9 November 2024

Pierre Ruffaut (born 17 June 1987) is a French professional footballer who plays as midfielder for Championnat National 3 club Onet-le-Château.

== Career ==
Ruffaut was a longtime player of Moulins, and at the age of 29 transferred to Rodez AF in 2016. He made his professional debut with Rodez in a 2–0 Ligue 2 win over AJ Auxerre on 26 July 2019.

On 3 June 2021 he moved to Cholet on a one-year deal.

On 1 July 2022, Ruffaut signed with Andrézieux in Championnat National 2.
