= Nassim Ouammou =

French footballer (born 1993)

Personal information
- Date of birth: 27 April 1993 (age 33)
- Place of birth: Saint-Etienne, France
- Height: 1.79 m (5 ft 10 1/2 in)
- Position: Midfielder

Team information
- Current team: Hassania Agadir
- Number: 21

Youth career
- 2000–2010: Saint-Étienne
- 2010–2011: Firminy
- 2011–2014: Marítimo

Senior career*
Years	Team	Apps	(Gls)
2014–2016	Andrézieux	24	(2)
2016	Athlético Marseille	3	(0)
2016–2017	Mulhouse	27	(3)
2017–2018	Rodez	22	(1)
2018–2019	Boulogne	21	(0)
2019–2023	Rodez	83	(1)
2023–2024	Maccabi Netanya	39	(1)
2024–2025	Sochaux	25	(1)
2025–	Hassania Agadir	7	(0)
- * Club domestic league appearances and goals as of 26 May 2025

Nassim Ouammou (born 27 April 1993) is a French-Moroccan professional footballer who plays as midfielder for Moroccan club Hassania Agadir.

== Career ==
On 26 June 2019, Ouammou signed a professional contract with Rodez AF after their promotion to the Ligue 2. He made his professional debut with Rodez in a 0–0 Ligue 2 tie with LB Châteauroux on 2 August 2019.

== Personal life ==
Born in France, Ouammou is of Moroccan descent. He acquired French nationality on 15 April 1998, through the collective effect of his mother's naturalization. In 2011, he declared an interest in representing Morocco internationally.
