= Pierre Bardy (footballer) =

French footballer (born 1992)

Personal information
- Full name: Pierre Luc Bardy-Alenda
- Date of birth: 27 August 1992 (age 34)
- Place of birth: Albi, France
- Height: 1.82 m (6 ft 0 in)
- Position: Defender

Team information
- Current team: Bayonne
- Number: 5

Youth career
- 2005–2006: ASPTT Albi
- 2006–2008: Albi
- 2008–2011: Rodez

Senior career*
| Years | Team | Apps | (Gls) |
| 2011–2022 | Rodez | 253 | (16) |
| 2022–2023 | Olympiakos Nicosia | 30 | (0) |
| 2023–2024 | Ypsonas Krasava | 14 | (1) |
| 2024–2025 | Ayia Napa | 24 | (0) |
| 2025– | Bayonne | 11 | (0) |
- * Club domestic league appearances and goals as of 4 December 2025

Pierre Luc Bardy-Alenda (born 27 August 1992) is a French professional footballer who plays as a defender for Bayonne.

== Career ==
Bardy joined the youth academy of Rodez AF at the age of 16, and spent over a decade at the club before helping them get promoted to the French Ligue 2. He made his professional debut with Rodez in a 2–0 Ligue 2 win over AJ Auxerre on 26 July 2019.

On 24 August 2022, Bardy signed a contract with Olympiakos Nicosia in Cyprus for one season, with an option to extend for another year. The next season he joined Cypriot club Ypsonas Krasava where he stayed for a single season before moving to his current club of Ayia Napa FC.
