= Abdourahmane Ndiaye (footballer) =

Senegalese footballer (born 1996)

Personal information
- Date of birth: 31 December 1996 (age 29)
- Place of birth: Dakar, Senegal
- Height: 1.89 m (6 ft 2 in)
- Position: Midfielder

Youth career
- Génération Foot

Senior career*
Years	Team	Apps	(Gls)
2018–2022	Pau FC	29	(1)
2018–2020	Pau FC II	5	(0)
2022–2024	Stade Briochin	46	(0)
- * Club domestic league appearances and goals as of 11 May 2024

Abdourahmane Ndiaye (born 31 December 1996) is a Senegalese professional footballer who plays as a midfielder.

== Career ==
Ndiaye helped Pau FC get promoted into the Ligue 2, and extended his contract with them on 6 June 2020. He made his professional debut with Pau in a 3–0 Ligue 2 loss to Valenciennes FC on 22 August 2020.
