= Florian David =

Footballer (born 1992)

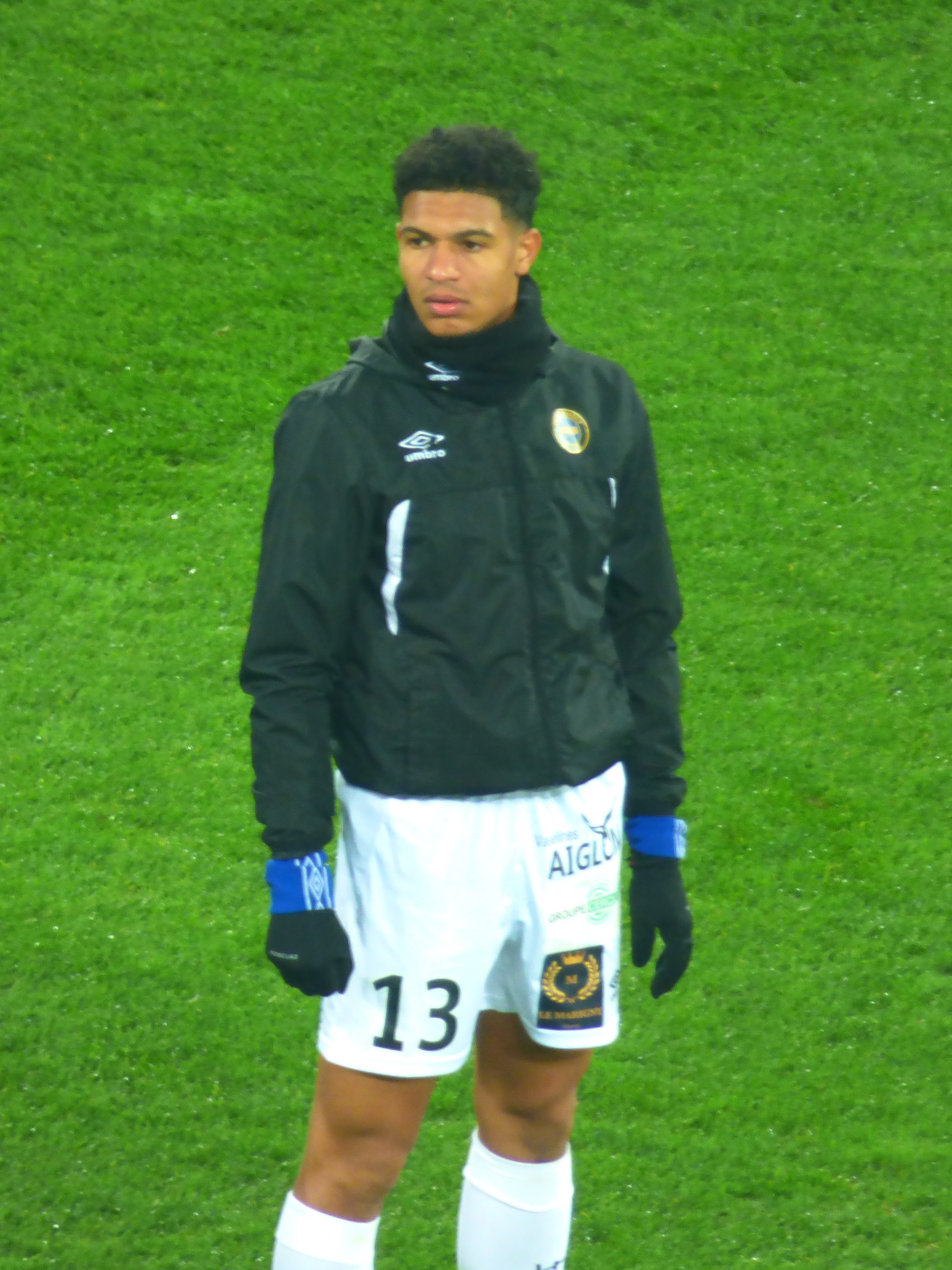
- David in 2019

Personal information
- Date of birth: 16 November 1992 (age 33)
- Place of birth: Champigny-sur-Marne, Paris, France
- Height: 1.80 m (5 ft 11 in)
- Position: Forward

Team information
- Current team: Atert Bissen
- Number: 11

Senior career*
| Years | Team | Apps | (Gls) |
| 2010–2015 | Toulouse B | 58 | (5) |
| 2015–2019 | Grenoble | 54 | (16) |
| 2018 | → Les Herbiers (loan) | 14 | (2) |
| 2018 | → Les Herbiers II (loan) | 1 | (0) |
| 2018–2019 | → Rodez (loan) | 26 | (11) |
| 2019–2020 | Chambly | 33 | (5) |
| 2020–2023 | Rodez | 51 | (6) |
| 2023 | Kauno Žalgiris | 30 | (7) |
| 2024–2025 | Swift Hesperange | 23 | (5) |
| 2025– | Atert Bissen | 20 | (1) |

International career^{‡}
| 2018– | Guadeloupe | 2 | (3) |
- * Club domestic league appearances and goals as of 13 June 2026 ‡ National team caps and goals as of 14:38, 14 December 2020 (UTC)

Florian David (born 16 November 1992) is a professional footballer who plays as a forward for Luxembourgish club Atert Bissen. Born in metropolitan France, he plays for the Guadeloupe national team.

== Club career ==
On 14 December 2020, David rejoined Rodez on a permanent deal until the end of the season after terminating his contract with Chambly early.

On 31 January 2023, David joined A Lyga club Kauno Žalgiris.

== Career statistics ==
=== Club ===
As of match played on 14 May 2022

Appearances and goals by club, season and competition
| Club | Season | League | | | Coupe de France | | Other | | Total | |
| Club | Season | Division | Apps | Goals | Apps | Goals | Apps | Goals | Apps | Goals |
|---|---|---|---|---|---|---|---|---|---|---|
| Toulouse B | 2010–11 | CFA 2 | 3 | 0 | – | | 0 | 0 | 3 | 0 |
| Toulouse B | 2011–12 | CFA 2 | 18 | 1 | – | | 0 | 0 | 18 | 1 |
| Toulouse B | 2012–13 | CFA 2 | 8 | 1 | – | | 0 | 0 | 8 | 1 |
| Toulouse B | 2013–14 | CFA 2 | 13 | 1 | – | | 0 | 0 | 13 | 1 |
| Toulouse B | 2014–15 | CFA 2 | 16 | 2 | – | | 0 | 0 | 16 | 2 |
| Toulouse B | Total | | 58 | 5 | 0 | 0 | 0 | 0 | 58 | 5 |
| Grenoble | 2015–16 | CFA | 29 | 11 | 1 | 0 | 0 | 0 | 30 | 11 |
| Grenoble | 2016–17 | CFA | 16 | 5 | 1 | 0 | 0 | 0 | 17 | 5 |
| Grenoble | 2017–18 | National | 9 | 0 | 1 | 1 | 0 | 0 | 10 | 1 |
| Grenoble | 2018–19 | Ligue 2 | 0 | 0 | 0 | 0 | 0 | 0 | 0 | 0 |
| Grenoble | Total | | 54 | 16 | 3 | 1 | 0 | 0 | 58 | 17 |
| Les Herbiers (loan) | 2017–18 | National | 14 | 2 | 3 | 1 | 0 | 0 | 17 | 3 |
| Les Herbiers II (loan) | 2017–18 | National 3 | 1 | 0 | – | | 0 | 0 | 1 | 0 |
| Rodez (loan) | 2018–19 | National | 26 | 11 | 2 | 2 | 0 | 0 | 28 | 13 |
| Chambly | 2019–20 | Ligue 2 | 27 | 5 | 2 | 1 | 0 | 0 | 29 | 6 |
| Chambly | 2020–21 | Ligue 2 | 6 | 0 | 0 | 0 | 0 | 0 | 6 | 0 |
| Chambly | Total | | 33 | 5 | 2 | 1 | 0 | 0 | 35 | 6 |
| Rodez | 2020–21 | Ligue 2 | 20 | 4 | 2 | 0 | 0 | 0 | 22 | 4 |
| Rodez | 2021–22 | Ligue 2 | 30 | 2 | 2 | 1 | 0 | 0 | 32 | 3 |
| Rodez | Total | | 50 | 6 | 4 | 1 | 0 | 0 | 54 | 7 |
| Career total | | | 236 | 45 | 14 | 6 | 0 | 0 | 250 | 51 |

=== International ===
As of matches played 16 June 2025

Appearances and goals by national team and year
| National team | Year | Apps | Goals |
|---|---|---|---|
| Guadeloupe | 2018 | 1 | 1 |
| Guadeloupe | 2019 | 1 | 2 |
| Guadeloupe | 2022 | 6 | 0 |
| Guadeloupe | 2025 | 3 | 1 |
| Total | | 11 | 4 |

Scores and results list Guadeloupe's goal tally first, score column indicates score after each David goal.

List of international goals scored by Florian David
| No. | Date | Venue | Opponent | Score | Result | Competition |
|---|---|---|---|---|---|---|
| 1 | 11 September 2018 | Raymond E. Guishard Technical Centre, The Valley, Anguilla | Saint Martin | 1–0 | 3–0 | 2019–20 CONCACAF Nations League qualification |
| 2 | 7 September 2019 | Stade René Serge Nabajoth, Les Abymes, Guadeloupe | Sint Maarten | 2–0 | 4–1 | 2019–20 CONCACAF Nations League C |
| 3 | 7 September 2019 | Stade René Serge Nabajoth, Les Abymes, Guadeloupe | Sint Maarten | 4–0 | 4–1 | 2019–20 CONCACAF Nations League C |
| 4 | 16 June 2025 | Dignity Health Sports Park, Carson, United States | Panama | 2–4 | 2–5 | 2025 CONCACAF Gold Cup |

== Honours ==
Les Herbiers

- Coupe de France runner-up: 2017–18
