= Nathanaël Dieng =

French footballer (born 1997)

Personal information
- Date of birth: 13 April 1997 (age 29)
- Place of birth: Grenoble, France
- Height: 1.80 m (5 ft 11 in)
- Position: Defender

Team information
- Current team: Thonon Evian

Youth career
- 2011–2014: Saint-Étienne

Senior career*
| Years | Team | Apps | (Gls) |
| 2014–2019 | Grenoble | 18 | (1) |
| 2018–2019 | → Rodez (loan) | 21 | (0) |
| 2019–2021 | Rodez | 37 | (0) |
| 2021–2023 | Red Star | 32 | (0) |
| 2023– | Thonon Evian | 0 | (0) |
- * Club domestic league appearances and goals as of 1 July 2023

Nathanaël Dieng (born 13 April 1997) is a French professional footballer who plays as defender for Thonon Evian.

== Career ==
A youth product of Saint-Étienne, Dieng joined his hometown club Grenoble in 2014, and went on loan with Rodez AF in 2018. He made his professional debut with Rodez in a 2–0 Ligue 2 win over AJ Auxerre on 26 July 2019.

Having been released by Rodez at the end of the 2020–21 season, Dieng moved to Red Star.

On 24 July 2023, Dieng signed with Thonon Evian.

== Personal life ==
Dieng is the younger brother of the footballer Timothée Dieng. Born in France, they are of Senegalese descent.
