= Andrézieux-Bouthéon FC =

French football club

- Full name: Andrézieux-Bouthéon Football Club
- Founded: 1947; 79 years ago
- Ground: L'Envol Stadium
- Capacity: 5,000
- Chairman: François Clerc
- Manager: Xavier Collin
- 2024–25: National 2 Group A, 11th of 16
- Website: https://www.andrezieuxboutheonfc.com
Home colours	Away colours

Andrézieux-Bouthéon Football Club (French pronunciation: [ɑ̃dʁezjø buteɔ̃ futbol klœb]) is a French association football team founded in 1947. Prior to July 2019 they were known by the name L'Association Sportive Forezienne Andrézieux-Bouthéon. They are based in Andrézieux-Bouthéon, Rhône-Alpes, France and are currently playing in the Championnat National 1, the fourth tier in the French football league system. They play at the L'Envol Stadium in Andrézieux-Bouthéon, inaugurated in 2016, which has a capacity of 5,000. Previously, they had played at Stade Roger Baudras.

== History ==
The club was founded in 1947. In 2016 they were promoted to the Championnat National 1. On 6 January 2019, the club beat Ligue 1 club Olympique de Marseille 2–0 in the round of 64 in the Coupe de France.

== Current squad ==
As of 2 February 2026

Note: Flags indicate national team as defined under FIFA eligibility rules; some limited exceptions apply. Players may hold more than one non-FIFA nationality.

No.	Pos.	Nation	Player
1	GK	FRA	Killian Le Roy
5	DF	FRA	Paul Lehoux
7	FW	FRA	Amine Kashi
8	MF	FRA	Louis Carnot
9	FW	FRA	Alvin Doucet
10	MF	FRA	Mickaël Latour
11	MF	FRA	Mathéo Remars
14	MF	FRA	Gabriel Tutu
16	GK	FRA	Axel Jorjet
17	MF	GAM	Yankuba Jarju

No.	Pos.	Nation	Player
18	MF	FRA	Jérémy Mangonzo
19	MF	FRA	Maël Yazid
22	DF	SEN	Clidis da Silva
24	DF	FRA	Kylian Le Her
25	DF	SUI	Sidy Diagne
26	DF	FRA	Pierre Nouvel
29	MF	FRA	Félix Ley
—	DF	FRA	Hichem Khoutri
—	MF	FRA	Tom Gomes

== Notable players ==
- (France) Saïmon Bouabré (youth)
- (Turkey) İlhan Fakılı (youth)

== Season-by-Season ==
Year	Level	Division	Position
1997–1998	5	Championnat de France Amateur 2 Group H	8th
1998–1999	5	Championnat de France Amateur 2 Group C	14th
1999–2000	6	Division d'Honneur Rhône-Alpes	7th
2000–2001	6	Division d'Honneur Rhône-Alpes	6th
2001–2002	6	Division d'Honneur Rhône-Alpes	1st
2002–2003	5	Championnat de France Amateur 2 Group D	5th
2003–2004	5	Championnat de France Amateur 2 Group D	8th
2004–2005	5	Championnat de France Amateur 2 Group C	3rd
2005–2006	4	Championnat de France Amateur Group C	16th
2006–2007	5	Championnat de France Amateur 2 Group C	1st
2007–2008	4	Championnat de France Amateur Group C	15th
2008–2009	4	Championnat de France Amateur Group B	4th
2009–2010	4	Championnat de France Amateur Group B	16th
2010–2011	5	Championnat de France Amateur 2 Group D	4th
2011–2012	5	Championnat de France Amateur 2 Group D	5th
2012–2013	5	Championnat de France Amateur 2 Group E	2nd
2013–2014	5	Championnat de France Amateur 2 Group D	3rd
2014–2015	5	Championnat de France Amateur 2 Group F	9th
2015–2016	5	Championnat de France Amateur 2 Group E	1st
2016–2017	4	Championnat National 2 Group B	6th
2017–2018	4	Championnat National 2 Group B	6th
2018–2019	4	Championnat National 2 Group B	
