= Louis Bury =

French footballer (born 1995)

Personal information
- Full name: Louis Bury
- Date of birth: 10 July 1995 (age 31)
- Place of birth: Pau, France
- Height: 1.84 m (6 ft 0 in)
- Position: Defender

Youth career
- 2008–2016: Pau FC

Senior career*
Years	Team	Apps	(Gls)
2016–2019	Pau II	19	(2)
2016–2022	Pau	86	(0)
- * Club domestic league appearances and goals as of 16 May 2021

Louis Bury (born 10 July 1995) is a French professional footballer who plays as a defender.

== Career ==
Bury joined the youth academy of Pau FC at the age of 13, and joined their senior team in 2016. Bury made his professional debut with Pau in a 4–1 Ligue 2 loss to AC Ajaccio on 5 January 2021.
