= Ayoub Ouhafsa =

French footballer (born 1997)

Personal information
- Date of birth: 14 November 1997 (age 28)
- Place of birth: Millau, France
- Height: 1.78 m (5 ft 10 in)
- Position: Forward

Team information
- Current team: Bavois
- Number: 24

Senior career*
Years	Team	Apps	(Gls)
2016–2018	Colomiers	39	(11)
2018–2019	Marseille II	11	(7)
2019–2021	Rodez	55	(6)
2021–2023	Xamax	32	(5)
2023–	Bavois	80	(24)
- * Club domestic league appearances and goals as of 1 October 2026

Ayoub Ouhafsa (born 14 November 1997) is a French professional footballer who plays as a forward for Bavois in the Swiss Promotion League.

== Professional career ==
On 16 July 2019, Ouhafsa joined Rodez AF from Marseille II. He made his professional debut with Rodez in a 2–0 Ligue 2 win over AJ Auxerre on 26 July 2019, scoring in the first minute of the game.

On 25 June 2021, he signed a one-year contract with Xamax in Switzerland as a free agent.

== Personal life ==
Born in France, Ouhafsa is of Moroccan descent.
