= Romain Armand =

French professional footballer (born 1987)

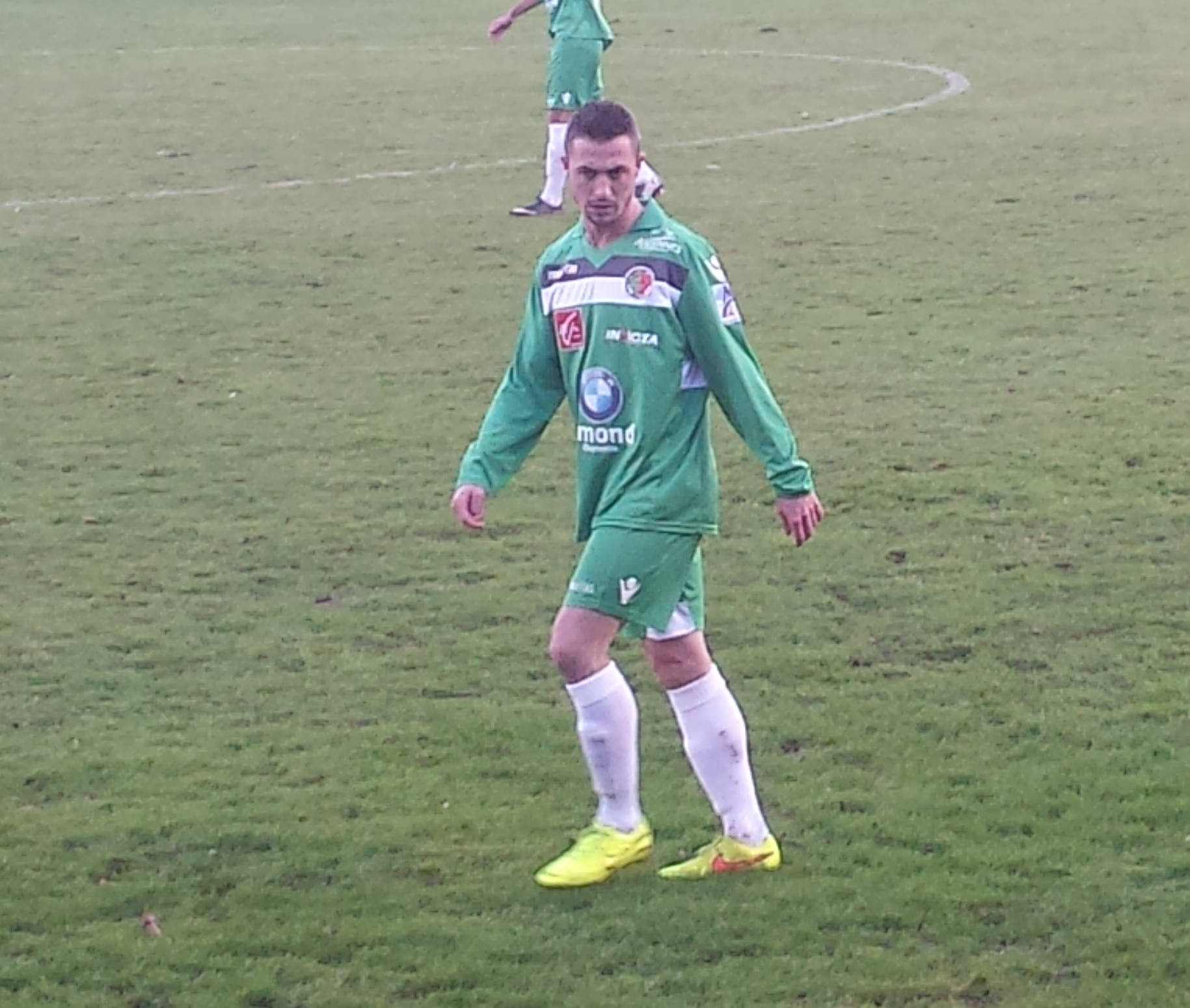
- Armand in 2015

Personal information
- Date of birth: 27 February 1987 (age 39)
- Place of birth: Orange, France
- Height: 1.82 m (6 ft 0 in)
- Position: Forward

Team information
- Current team: Bourges

Youth career
- 2004–2006: Montpellier

Senior career*
| Years | Team | Apps | (Gls) |
| 2006–2010 | Montpellier | 26 | (3) |
| 2009–2010 | → Clermont (loan) | 24 | (5) |
| 2010–2011 | Cannes | 19 | (7) |
| 2011–2013 | Clermont | 54 | (7) |
| 2013–2014 | Colmar | 27 | (6) |
| 2014–2015 | Sedan | 25 | (16) |
| 2015–2017 | Orléans | 61 | (18) |
| 2017–2019 | Gazélec Ajaccio | 61 | (17) |
| 2019–2020 | Paris FC | 23 | (7) |
| 2020–2022 | Pau FC | 68 | (12) |
| 2022–2023 | Versailles | 7 | (1) |
| 2023– | Bourges | 5 | (2) |
- * Club domestic league appearances and goals as of 2 December 2023

Romain Armand (born 27 February 1987) is a French professional footballer who plays for Championnat National 1 club Bourges as a forward.

== Club career ==
In June 2022, Armand signed with Versailles.
