= Alexis Peyrelade =

French footballer (born 1997)

Personal information
- Date of birth: 16 April 1997 (age 29)
- Place of birth: Le Mans, France
- Height: 1.79 m (5 ft 10 in)
- Position: Defender

Senior career*
Years	Team	Apps	(Gls)
2016–2021	Rodez	22	(1)
- * Club domestic league appearances and goals as of 15 May 2021

Alexis Peyrelade (born 16 April 1997) is a French professional footballer who plays as defender.

== Professional career ==
Peyrelade made his professional debut with Rodez AF in a 0–0 Ligue 2 tie with LB Châteauroux on 2 August 2019.

== Personal life ==
Peyrelade's father, Laurent Peyrelade, is a former footballer and his manager at Rodez.
