= Daouda Gueye =

Senegalese footballer

Personal information
- Date of birth: 22 December 1995 (age 30)
- Place of birth: Dakar, Senegal
- Height: 1.90 m (6 ft 3 in)
- Position: Forward

Team information
- Current team: Angoulême
- Number: 17

Senior career*
Years	Team	Apps	(Gls)
2016–2018	Douanes		
2018–2019	Aubagne	8	(1)
2019–2020	Bourges	21	(10)
2020–2021	Rodez II	5	(4)
2020–2021	Rodez	8	(0)
2021	→ Sète (loan)	8	(1)
2021–2022	Marseille B	21	(12)
2022–2024	Créteil	46	(14)
2024–	Angoulême	4	(1)
- * Club domestic league appearances and goals as of 6 December 2024

Daouda Gueye (born 22 December 1995) is a Senegalese professional footballer who plays as a forward for French club Angoulême.

== Career ==
On 13 May 2020, after a prolific season with Bourges 18 Gueye signed a professional contract with Rodez AF. Gueye made his professional debut with Rodez in a 2–2 Ligue 2 tie with Sochaux on 19 September 2020.

On 18 January 2021, Gueye joined Championnat National side Sète on loan.

On 26 August 2021, he moved to Marseille B. A year later, in August 2022, he moved to fellow league club US Créteil-Lusitanos.
