= Aurélien Tertereau =

French footballer (born 1991)

Personal information
- Date of birth: 24 July 1991 (age 35)
- Place of birth: Le Mans, France
- Height: 1.82 m (6 ft 0 in)
- Position: Midfielder

Team information
- Current team: C'Chartres

Youth career
- 2001–2010: Le Mans

Senior career*
Years	Team	Apps	(Gls)
2010–2014	Sablé	55	(22)
2014–2016	Le Mans	49	(13)
2016–2017	Fleury	28	(3)
2018	Entente	29	(2)
2018–2021	Rodez	59	(4)
2021–2023	Toulon	31	(1)
2023–2025	Avranches	58	(3)
2025–	C'Chartres	12	(1)
- * Club domestic league appearances and goals as of 16 June 2024

Aurélien Tertereau (born 24 July 1991) is a French professional footballer who plays as midfielder for Championnat National 3 club C'Chartres.

== Career ==
Tertereau is a youth product of Le Mans FC having joined their youth academy at the age of 10.

On 20 June 2018, Tertereau signed with Rodez AF after years in the lower leagues of France. He made his professional debut with Rodez in a 2–0 Ligue 2 win over AJ Auxerre on 26 July 2019.
