= Yankuba Jarju =

Gambian footballer (born 1996)

Personal information
- Date of birth: 20 August 1996 (age 30)
- Place of birth: Gambia
- Height: 1.82 m (6 ft 0 in)
- Position: Forward

Team information
- Current team: Andrézieux
- Number: 17

Senior career*
Years	Team	Apps	(Gls)
2014–2017	Real Banjul		
2017–2018	Génération Foot		
2018–2019	→ Pau (loan)	30	(8)
2019–2021	Pau	28	(5)
2021–2024	Cholet	104	(34)
2024–2025	Quevilly-Rouen	18	(2)
2025	Radnički 1923	13	(1)
2026–	Andrézieux	3	(0)

International career^{‡}
2017–2019	Gambia	3	(0)
- * Club domestic league appearances and goals as of 6 February 2026 ‡ National team caps and goals as of 13 October 2019

Yankuba Jarju (born 20 August 1996) is a Gambian professional footballer who plays as a forward for French Championnat National 1 club Andrézieux.

== Club career ==
Jarju started his career in his native Gambia, with Real Banjul, before spending a season with Génération Foot in Senegal. He arrived in France in the summer of 2018, initially on loan with Pau, but on a permanent contract from the summer of 2019. He was part of the side that gained promotion to Ligue 2 in 2020, but did not establish himself at that level, and moved to Cholet in January 2021.

== International career ==
Jarju made his debut with the Gambia national team in their 0–0 2018 African Nations Championship qualifying tie with Mali on 15 July 2017.
