= Rémy Boissier =

French footballer (born 1994)

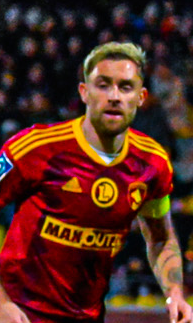
- Boissier in 2023

Personal information
- Date of birth: 22 February 1994 (age 32)
- Place of birth: Montauban, France
- Height: 1.78 m (5 ft 10 in)
- Position: Midfielder

Team information
- Current team: Amiens
- Number: 22

Youth career
- 2010–2012: Rodez

Senior career*
Years	Team	Apps	(Gls)
2012–2018	Rodez	102	(8)
2018–2020	Le Mans	42	(5)
2020	→ Rodez (loan)	8	(0)
2020–2023	Rodez	100	(12)
2023–2024	Dunkerque	23	(2)
2024–2026	Valenciennes	55	(3)
2026–	Amiens	0	(0)
- * Club domestic league appearances and goals as of 23 June 2026

Rémy Boissier (born 22 February 1994) is a French professional footballer who plays as a midfielder for Ligue 3 club Amiens.

== Life and career ==
Boissier was born in Montauban in 1994. He joined Rodez as a 16-year-old, and went on to make 76 appearances in the fourth-tier Championnat de France Amateur and a further 26 in the Championnat National. He was named in the 2017–18 Team of the Year at the Championnat National awards ceremony. After six senior seasons, he left Rodez, not "for the sake of it, nor for the money" but to further his development as a player.

He signed for another National team, Le Mans, helped them gain promotion to Ligue 2 in his first season – not least by scoring in each leg of the play-offs – and was again named in the Team of the Year. He made his Ligue 2 debut in the starting eleven for Le Mans' opening fixture of the 2019–20 season, and played regularly for a time, but gradually lost his place in the face of significant competition in midfield, and in January 2020, returned to Rodez on loan to the end of the campaign.

On 17 June 2024, Boissier signed with Valenciennes in Championnat National.
