= Alan Kerouedan =

French footballer (born 2000)

Personal information
- Full name: Alan Kerouedan
- Date of birth: 12 January 2000 (age 26)
- Place of birth: Quimper, France
- Height: 1.73 m (5 ft 8 in)
- Position: Winger

Team information
- Current team: Cannes
- Number: 11

Youth career
- 2005–2011: ES Mahalon Confort
- 2011–2014: SM Douarnenez
- 2014–2015: Concarneau
- 2015–2018: Rennes

Senior career*
Years	Team	Apps	(Gls)
2018–2020	Rennes B	28	(7)
2020–2022	Rodez	31	(1)
2020–2022	Rodez B	10	(0)
2022–2024	Avranches	65	(20)
2024–2026	Grenoble	37	(2)
2026	→ Rouen (loan)	12	(1)
2026–	Cannes	0	(0)

International career
2015–2016	France U16	16	(5)
2016–2017	France U17	13	(0)
2017–2018	France U18	6	(0)
- * Club domestic league appearances and goals as of 16 May 2026

Alan Kerouedan (born 23 January 2000) is a French professional footballer who plays as a winger for Ligue 3 club Cannes.

== Club career ==
On 3 June 2020, Kerouedan signed a professional contract with Rodez. Kerouedan made his professional debut with Rodez in a 1–0 Ligue 2 win over Grenoble on 22 August 2020.

On 10 June 2022, Kerouedan signed a pre-contract agreement to join Championnat National side Avranches on a free transfer.

On 11 June 2024, Kerouedan signed for Ligue 2 club Grenoble on a three-year contract.
