= Joris Chougrani =

French professional footballer (born 1991)

Personal information
- Date of birth: 30 March 1991 (age 35)
- Place of birth: Montpellier, France
- Height: 1.85 m (6 ft 1 in)
- Position: Left-back

Youth career
- 2003–2010: Rodez

Senior career*
Years	Team	Apps	(Gls)
2010–2025	Rodez	262	(17)
- * Club domestic league appearances and goals

Joris Chougrani (born 30 March 1991) is a French former professional footballer who played as left-back.

== Professional career ==
Chougrani is a youth product of Rodez AF, having joined the club at the age of 12. He made his professional debut with Rodez in a 2–0 Ligue 2 win over AJ Auxerre on 26 July 2019.

== Personal life ==
Born in France, Chougrani is of Algerian descent.
