= Laurent Peyrelade =

French footballer and manager (born 1970)

Personal information
- Date of birth: 7 April 1970 (age 56)
- Place of birth: Limoges, France
- Height: 1.80 m (5 ft 11 in)
- Position: Forward

Team information
- Current team: Bastia (manager)

Senior career*
Years	Team	Apps	(Gls)
1990–1993	Brive	1	(0)
1993–1994	Pau	11	(3)
1994–1995	Brive	34	(18)
1995–1996	Nantes	21	(0)
1996–1997	Le Mans	35	(1)
1997–2001	Lille	126	(36)
2001–2002	Sedan	20	(3)
2002–2005	Le Mans	91	(14)

Managerial career
- 2015–2022: Rodez
- 2023: Versailles
- 2024: Grenoble
- 2026: RCO Agde
- 2026–: Bastia
- * Club domestic league appearances and goals

Laurent Peyrelade (born 7 April 1970) is a French football manager and former player who is the head coach of Ligue 3 club Bastia. He played as a forward.

== Managerial career ==
On 16 May 2015, Peyrelade became the manager of Rodez AF. On 4 April 2019, he helped manage Rodez into the Ligue 2 for the first time in 26 years. Peyrelade managed Rodez to finishes of 16th, 15th, and 17th in his three full seasons with the club in the second tier before his sacking in November 2022, with Rodez in the relegation positions.

== Personal life ==
Peyrelade's managed his son Alexis Peyrelade while at Rodez.
