= Ugo Bonnet =

French footballer (born 1993)

Personal information
- Full name: Ugo Philippe Bonnet
- Date of birth: 17 September 1993 (age 33)
- Place of birth: Montpellier, France
- Height: 1.80 m (5 ft 11 in)
- Position: Forward

Team information
- Current team: Grenoble
- Number: 12

Youth career
- 2000–2008: Castelnau Le Crès
- 2009–2011: Rodez

Senior career*
Years	Team	Apps	(Gls)
2011–2014	Rodez B		
2014–2022	Rodez	179	(36)
2022–2024	Valenciennes	67	(8)
2024	Guingamp	8	(0)
2024–2026	IMT	35	(5)
2026–	Grenoble	13	(1)
- * Club domestic league appearances and goals as of 12 May 2026

Ugo Philippe Bonnet (born 17 September 1993) is a French professional footballer who plays as a forward for Ligue 2 club Grenoble.

== Career ==
A youth player of Castelnau Le Crès until 2008, Bonnet moved to the United States for a year before joining Rodez when he returned to France. He made his professional debut in Ligue 2 with Rodez in a 2–0 win over Auxerre on 26 July 2019, scoring in the first minute of the game.

On 27 January 2022, Bonnet signed for Ligue 2 side Valenciennes.

On 1 February 2024, Bonnet joined Guingamp until the end of the 2023–24 season.

On 2 February 2026, Bonnet moved to Grenoble in Ligue 2.
