= 2021–22 Nîmes Olympique season =

Nîmes Olympique
2021–22 season
- President: Rani Assaf
- Head coach: Nicolas Usaï
- Stadium: Stade du Hainaut
- Ligue 2: 9th
- Coupe de France: Round of 64
- Top goalscorer: League: Moussa Koné (11); All: Yassine Benrahou; Moussa Koné (12 each)
Home colours	Away colours	Third colours

The 2021–22 season was the 35th season in the existence of Nîmes Olympique and the club's first season back in the second division of French football. In addition to the domestic league, Nîmes participated in this season's edition of the Coupe de France.

== Players ==
=== First-team squad ===
Note: Flags indicate national team as defined under FIFA eligibility rules; some limited exceptions apply. Players may hold more than one non-FIFA nationality.

No.	Pos.	Nation	Player
1	GK	NOR	Per Kristian Bråtveit (on loan from Djurgården)
2	DF	FRA	Kelyan Guessoum
3	DF	FRA	Scotty Sadzoute (on loan from OH Leuven)
4	DF	FRA	Pablo Martinez
5	DF	JPN	Naomichi Ueda
6	MF	SEN	Sidy Sarr
7	MF	SWE	Niclas Eliasson
9	FW	ISL	Elías Már Ómarsson
10	MF	ALG	Zinedine Ferhat
12	MF	FRA	Lamine Fomba
14	MF	FRA	Antoine Valério
15	DF	FRA	Gaëtan Paquiez
16	GK	FRA	Lucas Dias

No.	Pos.	Nation	Player
17	DF	FRA	Théo Sainte-Luce
18	MF	PAR	Andrés Cubas
19	DF	FRA	Julien Ponceau (on loan from Lorient)
21	DF	FRA	Patrick Burner
22	MF	MAR	Yassine Benrahou
23	DF	FRA	Anthony Briançon (captain)
24	FW	MLI	Mahamadou Doucouré
28	FW	SEN	Moussa Koné
28	DF	SEN	Moustapha Mbow (on loan from Reims)
30	GK	FRA	Amjhad Nazih
32	MF	FRA	Léon Delpech
33	DF	FRA	Pierre Zaidan

== Transfers ==
=== Out ===
No.	Pos.	Player	Transferred to	Fee	Date	Source
25	DF	(Norway) Birger Meling	Rennes	€3M	20 July 2021	

== Pre-season and friendlies ==
Win Draw Loss

10 July 2021 Friendly	Troyes (France)	2–2	(France) Nîmes	France
17:15 CEST (UTC+2)

17 July 2021 Friendly	Nîmes (France)	1–0	(France) Ajaccio	Mallemort, France
17:30 CEST (UTC+2)				Stadium: Stade D'Honneur Mallemort

== Competitions ==
=== Overall record ===
Competition	First match	Last match	Starting round	Final position	Record							
Competition	First match	Last match	Starting round	Final position	Pld	W	D	L	GF	GA	GD	Win %
Ligue 2	24 July 2021	14 May 2022	Matchday 1	9th	38	14	7	17	44	51	−7	36.84
Coupe de France	13 November 2021	18 December 2021	Seventh round	Round of 64	3	1	1	1	6	6	+0	33.33
Total					41	15	8	18	50	57	−7	36.59

Source: Soccerway

=== Ligue 2 ===
==== League table ====
Pos	Team	Pld	W	D	L	GF	GA	GD	Pts
7	Caen	38	13	11	14	51	42	+9	50
8	Le Havre	38	13	11	14	38	41	−3	50
9	Nîmes	38	14	7	17	44	51	−7	49
10	Pau	38	14	7	17	41	49	−8	49
11	Dijon	38	13	8	17	48	53	−5	47

Source: Ligue 2
Rules for classification: 1) Points; 2) Goal difference; 3) Number of goals scored; 4) Head-to-head goal difference; 5) Fair play points

==== Results summary ====
Overall								Home						Away					
Pld	W	D	L	GF	GA	GD	Pts	W	D	L	GF	GA	GD	W	D	L	GF	GA	GD
38	14	7	17	44	51	−7	49	6	4	9	22	28	−6	8	3	8	22	23	−1

Source: Ligue 2

==== Results by round ====
Round	1	2	3	4	5	6	7	8	9	10	11	12	13	14	15	16	17	18	19	20	21	22	23	24	25	26	27	28	29	30	31	32	33	34	35	36	37	38
Ground	A	H	A	H	A	H	A	H	A	H	A	H	A	H	A	H	A	H	H	A	H	A	H	A	H	A	H	A	H	A	H	A	H	A	H	A	A	H
Result	D	W	W	D	W	D	L	D	L	L	D	L	L	L	W	W	L	W	L	W	W	W	L	L	W	L	D	W	L	L	L	D	L	W	W	W	L	L
Position	9	7	3	5	2	4	7	6	8	10	11	13	16	17	13	11	12	10	12	10	10	8	8	8	7	9	8	7	7	10	13	13	13	10	9	8	9	9

Source: Ligue 2
A = Away; H = Home; W = Win; D = Draw; L = Loss

==== Matches ====
The league fixtures were announced on 25 June 2021.

24 July 2021 1	Bastia	1–1	Nîmes	Furiani
15:00 CEST (UTC+2)	Diongue 51'	Report	Fomba 12'	Stadium: Stade Armand Cesari; Referee: Jérôme Miguelgorry

31 July 2021 2	Nîmes	2–1	Dijon	Nîmes
19:00 CET (UTC+1)	Benrahou 28' (pen.); Cubas (yellow card) 37'; Martinez (yellow card) 45+1'; Fomba 80'	Report	Traoré (red card) 26'; Ngouyamsa (yellow card) 35'; Coulibaly (yellow card) 45+1'; Assalé 79'	Stadium: Stade des Costières; Referee: Benjamin Lepaysant

7 August 2021 3	Valenciennes	0–3	Nîmes	Valenciennes
19:00 CEST (UTC+2)	Cuffaut (yellow card) 28'; Yatabaré (yellow card) 70'	Report	Fomba (yellow card) 32'; Ómarsson (yellow card) 45+1', (goal) 56'; Benrahou 81'; Eliasson 83'	Stadium: Stade du Hainaut; Referee: Bartolomeu Varela

14 August 2021 4	Nîmes	0–0	Pau	Nîmes
19:00 CET (UTC+1)		Report		Stadium: Stade des Costières; Referee: Mathieu Vernice

21 August 2021 5	Dunkerque	0–2	Nîmes	Dunkerque
19:00 CEST (UTC+2)	Ouadah (yellow card) 47'	Report	Cubas (yellow card) 37'; Burner (yellow card) 55'; Benrahou 70'; Eliasson 90+4'	Stadium: Stade Marcel-Tribut; Referee: Alexandre Perreau Niel

28 August 2021 6	Nîmes	0–0	Caen	Nîmes
15:00 CEST (UTC+2)	Ueda (yellow card) 11'; Martinez (yellow card) 49'	Report	Abdi (yellow card) 10'; Riou (yellow card) 28'	Stadium: Stade des Costières; Attendance: 3,296; Referee: Florent Batta

11 September 2021 7	Grenoble	2–1	Nîmes	Grenoble
19:00 CEST (UTC+2)	Monfray (yellow card) 48'; Diallo 54'; Néry (yellow card) 64'; Henen 90+3', (yellow card) 90+4'	Report	Delpech 1'; Burner (yellow card) 61'; Aribi (yellow card) 65'; Martinez (yellow card) 74'; Koné (yellow card) 86'	Stadium: Stade des Alpes; Referee: Bastien Dechepy

18 September 2021 8	Nîmes	3–3	Amiens	Nîmes
19:00 CEST (UTC+2)	Benrahou 16'; Sainte-Luce 21'; Delpech (yellow card) 66'; Koné 75', (yellow card) 77'; Fomba (yellow card) 90+1'; Martinez (yellow card) 90+5'	Report	Xantippe (yellow card) 35'; Bamba (yellow card) 44'; Badji 60'; Lomotey (yellow card) 72'; Lahne 89'; Arokodare 90+5'	Stadium: Stade des Costières; Referee: Remi Landry

21 September 2021 9	Paris FC	2–0	Nîmes	Paris
20:00 CEST (UTC+2)	Name (yellow card) 42'; Kanté 60'; Caddy 74'	Report	Guessoum (yellow card) 39'	Stadium: Stade Sébastien Charléty; Referee: Pierre Gaillouste

24 September 2021 10	Nîmes	0–1	Le Havre	Nîmes
19:00 CEST (UTC+2)	Ponceau (yellow card) 45'	Report	Boutaïb (yellow card) 37'; Thiaré 64'; Gibaud (yellow card) 80'	Stadium: Stade des Costières; Referee: Aurelien Petit

2 October 2021 11	Auxerre	2–2	Nîmes	Auxerre
15:00 CEST (UTC+2)	Touré (yellow card) 18'; Charbonnier (yellow card) 23', (goal) 48'; Autret 40'	Report	Cubas (yellow card) 37'; Koné 75', 90', (yellow card) 90+1'; Sainte-Luce (yellow card) 79'	Stadium: Stade de l'Abbé-Deschamps; Referee: Romain Lissorgue

18 October 2021 12	Nîmes	0–2	Ajaccio	Nîmes
20:45 CEST (UTC+2)	Ferhat (yellow card) 66'; Guessoum (yellow card) 90'	Report	Courtet 12'; Cimignani (yellow card) 31'; Nouri 33'; El Idrissy (yellow card) 40'	Stadium: Stade des Costières; Referee: Guillaume Paradis

23 October 2021 13	Guingamp	3–1	Nîmes	Guingamp
19:00 CEST (UTC+2)	Pierrot 5', 66'; M'Changama 69'; Livolant (yellow card) 81'	Report	Paquiez (yellow card) 70'; Koné (yellow card) 75', (goal) 80' (pen.); Ómarsson (yellow card) 81'; Sainte-Luce (yellow card) 86'	Stadium: Stade de Roudourou; Referee: Jérôme Miguelgorry

30 October 2021 14	Nîmes	1–2	Niort	Nîmes
19:00 CEST (UTC+2)	Eliasson 53'; Guessoum (yellow card) 66'; Paquiez (yellow card) 85'	Report	Mendes (yellow card) 13', (goal) 51'; Zemzemi 25'	Stadium: Stade des Costières; Referee: Olivier Thual

6 November 2021 15	Sochaux	0–1	Nîmes	Montbéliard
21:00 CEST (UTC+2)		Report	Sainte-Luce (yellow card) 59'; Benrahou 77'	Stadium: Stade Auguste Bonal; Referee: Bastien Dechepy

20 November 2021 16	Nîmes	2–1	Quevilly-Rouen	Nîmes
19:00 CEST (UTC+2)	Ponceau (yellow card) 13'; Ómarsson 27'; Ueda (yellow card) 52'; Benrahou 54'; Fomba (yellow card) 74'; Paquiez (yellow card) 75'	Report	Nazon 16'; Gbellé (yellow card) 65'	Stadium: Stade des Costières; Referee: Alexandre Perreau Niel

3 December 2021 17	Rodez	1–0	Nîmes	Rodez
19:00 CET (UTC+1)	Leborgne 14' (pen.), (yellow card) 55'; Bardy (yellow card) 41'	Report	Guessoum (yellow card) 13'; Delpech (yellow card) 84'	Stadium: Stade Paul-Lignon; Referee: Guillaume Paradis

11 December 2021 18	Nîmes	2–1	Nancy	Nîmes
19:00 CEST (UTC+2)	Ómarsson 27'; Burner (yellow card) 38'; Koné 44'; Fomba (yellow card) 69'; Martinez (yellow card) 88'	Report	Thiam 42'; Ciss (yellow card) 43'; Lefebvre (yellow card) 81' (yellow-red card) 82'	Stadium: Stade des Costières; Referee: Benjamin Lepaysant

21 December 2021 19	Nîmes	1–2	Toulouse	Nîmes
20:45 CET (UTC+1)	Koné (yellow card) 5'; Eliasson (yellow card) 16'; Cubas (yellow card) 75', (goal) 82'; Martinez (yellow card) 78'	Report	Nicolaisen 3'; Evitt-Healey 60'; Onaiwu (yellow card) 83'; Genreau (yellow card) 86'	Stadium: Stade des Costières; Referee: Willy Delajod

8 January 2022 20	Dijon	1–2	Nîmes	Dijon
19:00 CET (UTC+1)	Jacob (yellow card) 54'; Philippoteaux 57'; Ahlinvi (yellow card) 60'; Ngouyamsa (yellow card) 64'	Report	Eliasson 5'; Sainte-Luce (yellow card) 17' (yellow-red card) 45'; Ponceau 30'; Bråtveit (yellow card) 85'	Stadium: Stade Gaston Gérard; Referee: Mathieu Vernice

28 January 2022 21	Nîmes	2–1	Valenciennes	Nîmes
20:45 CET (UTC+1)	Benrahou 11' (pen.); Ponceau 16'; Fomba (yellow card) 42'	Report	Picouleau (yellow card) 5'; Cuffaut 53' (pen.); Guillaume (yellow card) 62'	Stadium: Stade des Costières; Referee: Romain Lissorgue

1 February 2022 22	Pau	0–3	Nîmes	Pau
19:00 CEST (UTC+2)	Poha (yellow card) 51'	Report	Sainte-Luce (yellow card) 18'; Martinez (yellow card) 44'; Koné 59'; Benrahou 85' (pen.); Ómarsson 90+2'	Stadium: Nouste Camp; Referee: Remi Landry

5 February 2022 23	Nîmes	0–1	Dunkerque	Nîmes
19:00 CET (UTC+1)	Delpech (yellow card) 28'; Koné (yellow card) 48'; Ómarsson (red card) 67'; Sarr (yellow card) 81'; Ponceau (yellow card) 90+1'	Report	Huysman (yellow card) 19'; Tchokounté (yellow card) 53'; Trichard (yellow card) 61'; Rocheteau 73'; I. Gomis (yellow card) 81'	Stadium: Stade des Costières; Referee: Benjamin Lepaysant

12 February 2022 24	Caen	4–0	Nîmes	Caen
19:00 CET (UTC+1)	da Costa 9'; Mendy 19', 45+4' (pen.); Abdi 56'; Traoré (yellow card) 81'	Report	Koné (yellow card) 24'; Mbow (red card) 45+4'	Stadium: Stade Michel d'Ornano; Referee: Olivier Thual

19 February 2022 25	Nîmes	3–1	Grenoble	Nîmes
20:45 CET (UTC+1)	Koné 37', 58'; Eliasson 73'; Ponceau (yellow card) 77'; Valério (yellow card) 82'; Paquiez (yellow card) 86'	Report	Jeno (yellow card) 15' (yellow-red card) 24'; Correa 62'	Stadium: Stade des Costières; Referee: Alexandre Perreau Niel

26 February 2022 26	Amiens	3–0	Nîmes	Amiens
19:00 CET (UTC+1)	Badji 32'; Arokodare 68', 83'; Xantippe (yellow card) 90'; Gene (yellow card) 90+1'	Report	Burner (yellow card) 22'; Valério (yellow card) 81'	Stadium: Stade de la Licorne; Referee: Marc Bollengier

5 March 2022 27	Nîmes	1–1	Paris FC	Nîmes
15:00 CET (UTC+1)	Martinez (yellow card) 9'; Eliasson 39'; Ferhat (penalty missed) 66'	Report	Boutaïb 24'; Kanté (yellow card) 42'	Stadium: Stade des Costières; Referee: Mathieu Vernice

12 March 2022 28	Le Havre	0–1	Nîmes	Le Havre
19:00 CET (UTC+1)		Report	Fomba (yellow card) 35'; Benrahou 45+1' (pen.); Guessoum (yellow card) 75'	Stadium: Stade Océane; Referee: Pierre Legat

15 March 2022 29	Nîmes	1–2	Auxerre	Nîmes
15:00 CET (UTC+1)	Benrahou 20'	Report	Hein 9'; Perrin 25'; Sinayoko (yellow card) 42'; Arcus (yellow card) 44'; Sakhi (red card) 90+4'	Stadium: Stade des Costières; Referee: Pierre Gaillouste

19 March 2022 30	Ajaccio	1–0	Nîmes	Ajaccio
19:00 CET (UTC+1)	Laçi 48'; Gonzalez (yellow card) 86'	Report	Benrahou (yellow card) 90+3'	Stadium: Stade François Coty; Referee: Olivier Thual

2 April 2022 31	Nîmes	0–2	Guingamp	Nîmes
19:00 CEST (UTC+2)	Mbow (yellow card) 32'	Report	Livolant 48'; Pierrot 86'	Stadium: Stade des Costières; Referee: Alexandre Perreau Niel

9 April 2022 32	Niort	0–0	Nîmes	Niort
20:00 CEST (UTC+2)	Mendes (yellow card) 90+1'	Report	Cubas (yellow card) 45'; Fomba (yellow card) 50'	Stadium: Stade René Gaillard; Referee: Marc Bollengier

16 April 2022 33	Nîmes	1–3	Sochaux	Nîmes
19:00 CEST (UTC+2)	Ponceau 4'; Fomba (yellow card) 35'; Koné (penalty missed) 90+4'	Report	Thioune 39'; Virginius 70'; Kaabouni (yellow card) 73'; Kitala 80'; Ndour (yellow card) 90+3'	Stadium: Stade des Costières; Referee: Mikaël Lesage

19 April 2022 34	Quevilly-Rouen	0–1	Nîmes	Le Petit-Quevilly
20:00 CET (UTC+1)	Lejeune (yellow card) 49'; Cissokho (yellow card) 90+1'	Report	Eliasson 9'; Delpech (yellow card) 60'; Fomba (yellow card) 67'; Ueda (yellow card) 81'; Koné (yellow card) 86'	Stadium: Stade Robert Diochon; Referee: Aurélien Petit

22 April 2022 35	Nîmes	3–2	Rodez	Nîmes
21:00 CEST (UTC+2)	Koné 18'; Ómarsson 36', 90+3'	Report	Malanda (yellow card) 48'; Danger 52'; Célestine 55'; Rajot (yellow card) 81'	Stadium: Stade des Costières; Referee: Mathieu Vernice

30 April 2022 36	Nancy	1–3	Nîmes	Tomblaine
21:00 CET (UTC+1)	L. Cissé 61' (pen.); Haag (yellow card) 76'	Report	Sarr (yellow card) 16', (goal) 44'; Koné 64', 90+2'; Briançon (yellow card) 70'	Stadium: Stade Marcel Picot; Referee: Bartolomeu Varela

7 May 2022 37	Toulouse	2–1	Nîmes	Toulouse
19:00 CET (UTC+1)	Spierings (yellow card) 27'; Onaiwu 49'; Genreau 78'	Report	Briançon 25'; Fomba (yellow card) 31'	Stadium: Stadium de Toulouse; Referee: Jérôme Miguelgorry

14 May 2022 38	Nîmes	0–2	Bastia	Nîmes
19:00 CEST (UTC+2)	Eliasson (yellow card) 82'	Report	Le Cardinal 48'; Zolotov (yellow card) 52'; Santelli 65'	Stadium: Stade des Costières; Referee: Benjamin Lepaysant

=== Coupe de France ===
13 November 2021 Seventh round	FC Chusclan-Laudun-l'Ardoise (Note: A technical challenge on the outcome of the sixth round game led to the game being ordered to be replayed on 7 November 2021, however the appeal commission overruled the decision, re-instating the original result.)	0–3	Nîmes	Pont-Saint-Esprit
14:00 CET		Report	Koné 36'; Ómarsson 54'; Benrahou 90' (pen.)	Stadium: Stade Clos Bon Aure; Referee: Ahmed Taleb

27 November 2021 Eighth round	Aubagne FC	2–2 (3–4 p)	Nîmes	Aubagne
16:00 CET	Benarbia 13'; Mendy 16'	Report	Ponceau 2'; Benrahou 38'	Stadium: Stade de Lattre-de-Tassigny; Referee: Aurélien Petit

18 December 2021 Round of 64	Toulouse	4–1	Nîmes	Toulouse
13:45 CET (UTC+1)	Onaiwu 35', 45'; Healey 70'; Ratão 73'	Report	Doucouré 15'	Stadium: Stadium de Toulouse; Referee: Thomas Léonard
