= 2019–20 Nîmes Olympique season =

Nîmes Olympique
2019–20 season
- President: Rani Assaf
- Head coach: Bernard Blaquart
- Stadium: Stade des Costières
- Ligue 1: 18th
- Coupe de France: Round of 32
- Coupe de la Ligue: Round of 16
- Top goalscorer: League: Romain Philippoteaux (5); All: Romain Philippoteaux; Renaud Ripart (5 each)
- Highest home attendance: 13,802 (vs Saint-Étienne, 29 September 2019)
- Lowest home attendance: 11,867 (vs Reims, 11 January 2020)
- Average home league attendance: 12,531
- Biggest win: Nîmes 3–0 Brest
- Biggest defeat: Bordeaux 6–0 Nîmes
Home colours	Away colours	Third colours

The 2019–20 Nîmes Olympique season was the club's 82nd season in existence and the club's second consecutive season in the top flight of French football. In addition to the domestic league, Nîmes participated in this season's editions of the Coupe de France, and the Coupe de la Ligue. The season covered the period from 1 July 2019 to 30 June 2020.

== Players ==
=== Squad ===
As of 19 January 2020.

Note: Flags indicate national team as defined under FIFA eligibility rules; some limited exceptions apply. Players may hold more than one non-FIFA nationality.

No.	Pos.	Nation	Player
4	DF	FRA	Pablo Martinez
5	DF	FRA	Loïck Landre
6	MF	SEN	Sidy Sarr
7	MF	FRA	Romain Philippoteaux
8	MF	FRA	Lucas Deaux
9	FW	FRA	Clément Depres
10	MF	ALG	Zinedine Ferhat
11	FW	MKD	Vlatko Stojanovski
12	MF	FRA	Lamine Fomba
14	MF	FRA	Antoine Valério
15	DF	FRA	Gaëtan Paquiez
16	GK	FRA	Lucas Dias

No.	Pos.	Nation	Player
17	MF	BIH	Haris Duljević
18	MF	FRA	Theo Valls
19	DF	FRA	Lucas Buadés
20	FW	FRA	Renaud Ripart (vice-captain)
21	DF	FRA	Kelyan Guessoum
22	MF	MAR	Yassine Benrahou (on loan from Bordeaux)
23	DF	FRA	Anthony Briançon (captain)
24	FW	MAR	Sami Ben Amar
26	DF	FRA	Florian Miguel
27	FW	TOG	Kévin Denkey
29	DF	FRA	Sofiane Alakouch
30	GK	FRA	Paul Bernardoni (on loan from Bordeaux)

=== Reserve squad ===
As of 4 November 2019

Note: Flags indicate national team as defined under FIFA eligibility rules; some limited exceptions apply. Players may hold more than one non-FIFA nationality.

No.	Pos.	Nation	Player
—	GK	FRA	Côme Charrier
—	GK	FRA	Valentin Rabouille
—	DF	FRA	Alexandre Ferreira
—	DF	FRA	Jérémy Iafrate
—	DF	FRA	Enzo Fontanelli
—	DF	FRA	Matéo Maillefaud
—	DF	FRA	Julien Megier
—	DF	FRA	Mickaël Gas
—	MF	FRA	Kléri Serber

No.	Pos.	Nation	Player
—	MF	FRA	Mattéo Ahlinvi
—	MF	FRA	Simon Calancha
—	MF	FRA	Nacim El Hassani
—	MF	FRA	Quentin Gregorio
—	FW	FRA	Luca Valls
—	FW	FRA	Axel Urie
—	FW	FRA	Timothy Cardona
—	MF	FRA	Hugo Huriez
—	MF	FRA	Houssine Labiad

=== Out on loan ===
Note: Flags indicate national team as defined under FIFA eligibility rules; some limited exceptions apply. Players may hold more than one non-FIFA nationality.

No.	Pos.	Nation	Player
—	DF	FRA	Théo Sainte-Luce (on loan to Gazélec until 30 June 2020)

== Pre-season and friendlies ==
Win Draw Loss

5 July 2019 Friendly	Béziers (France)	0–0	(France) Nîmes	Béziers, France
17:30 CEST (UTC+2)		Report		Stadium: Stade de Sauclières

12 July 2019 Friendly	Nîmes (France)	3–2	(France) Rodez	Nîmes, France
19:00 CEST (UTC+2)	Ripart 32'; Philippoteaux 63'; Denkey 89'	Report	Bonnet 64'; Ruffaut 71' (pen.)	Stadium: Centre de Formation La Bastide

19 July 2019 Friendly	Nîmes (France)	2–2	(France) Ajaccio	Saint-Gilles, Gard, France
17:30 CEST (UTC+2)	Ripart 5', 26' (pen.)		Youssouf 45+1'; Avinel 52'	Stadium: Stade d’Espeyran

3 August 2019 Friendly	Nîmes (France)	0–2	(France) Dijon	Vauvert, France
18:00 CEST (UTC+2)			Baldé 6'; Jeannot 20'	Stadium: Stade de Vauvert

== Competitions ==
=== Overview ===
Competition	First match	Last match	Starting round	Final position	Record							
Competition	First match	Last match	Starting round	Final position	Pld	W	D	L	GF	GA	GD	Win %
Ligue 1	11 August 2019	7 March 2020	Matchday 1	18th	28	7	6	15	29	44	−15	25.00
Coupe de France	4 January 2020	19 January 2020	Round of 64	Round of 32	2	0	1	1	2	7	−5	0.00
Coupe de la Ligue	29 October 2019	18 December 2019	Round of 32	Round of 16	2	1	0	1	4	2	+2	50.00
Total					32	8	7	17	35	53	−18	25.00

Source: Soccerway

=== Ligue 1 ===
==== League table ====
Pos	Team	Pld	W	D	L	GF	GA	GD	Pts	PPG	Qualification or relegation
16	Dijon	28	7	9	12	27	37	−10	30	1.07	
17	Saint-Étienne	28	8	6	14	29	45	−16	30	1.07	
18	Nîmes (Note: Originally, the 18th-placed Ligue 1 team would play in promotion-relegation play-offs at the end of the season with a team from Ligue 2 to decide whether they would remain in Ligue 1 for the 2020–21 season, but the play-offs were cancelled and the 18th-placed team remained in Ligue 1.)	28	7	6	15	29	44	−15	27	0.96	
19	Amiens (R)	28	4	11	13	31	50	−19	23	0.82	Relegation to Ligue 2
20	Toulouse (R)	28	3	4	21	22	58	−36	13	0.46	Relegation to Ligue 2

Source: Ligue 1
Rules for classification: 1) Points per game; 2) Head-to-head points; 3) Head-to-head goal difference; 4) Goal difference; 5) Goals scored; 6) Fairplay ranking.
(R) Relegated

==== Results summary ====
Overall								Home						Away					
Pld	W	D	L	GF	GA	GD	Pts	W	D	L	GF	GA	GD	W	D	L	GF	GA	GD
28	7	6	15	29	44	−15	27	6	2	6	17	15	+2	1	4	9	12	29	−17

Source: Ligue 1

==== Results by round ====
Round	1	2	3	4	5	6	7	8	9	10	11	12	13	14	15	16	17	18	19	20	21	22	23	24	25	26	27	28	29	30	31	32	33	34	35	36	37	38
Ground	A	H	A	H	A	H	A	H	A	H	A	H	A	A	H	A	H	H	A	H	A	H	H	A	H	A	H	A	A	H	A	H	A	H	A	H	A	H
Result	L	L	D	W	D	W	L	L	D	D	D	L	L	L	D	L	L	L	L	W	L	W	W	W	W	L	L	L	C	C	C	C	C	C	C	C	C	C
Position	19	19	18	13	14	11	12	15	14	18	18	20	20	19	19	20	20	19	19	19	19	19	18	18	17	18	18	18	18	18	18	18	18	18	18	18	18	18

Source: Ligue 1
A = Away; H = Home; W = Win; D = Draw; L = Loss; C = Cancelled

==== Matches ====
The Ligue 1 schedule was announced on 14 June 2019. The Ligue 1 matches were suspended by the LFP on 13 March 2020 due to COVID-19 until further notices. On 28 April 2020, it was announced that Ligue 1 and Ligue 2 campaigns would not resume, after the country banned all sporting events until September. On 30 April, The LFP ended officially the 2019–20 season.

11 August 2019 1	Paris Saint-Germain	3–0	Nîmes	Paris
21:00 CEST (UTC+2)	Cavani 24' (pen.); Verratti (yellow card) 45+1'; Mbappé 56'; Draxler (yellow card) 61'; Di María 69'	Report		Stadium: Parc des Princes; Attendance: 47,151; Referee: Clément Turpin

17 August 2019 2	Nîmes	1–2	Nice	Nîmes
20:00 CEST (UTC+2)	Valls (yellow card) 25'; Ripart 45+1' (pen.); Martinez (yellow card) 71' (yellow-red card) 90+8'; Philippoteaux (yellow card) 89'; Alakouch (yellow card) 90+1'; Briançon (red card) 90+8'	Report	Cyprien 10' (pen.), (yellow card) 43'; Coly (yellow card) 11' (yellow-red card) 51'; Ganago 16'; Hérelle (yellow card) 35'; Tameze (yellow card) 72'	Stadium: Stade des Costières; Attendance: 13,243; Referee: François Letexier

25 August 2019 3	Monaco	2–2	Nîmes	Monaco
15:00 CEST (UTC+2)	Slimani (yellow card) 13', (goal) 39'; Ben Yedder 45+1'; Jemerson (yellow card) 53' (yellow-red card) 56'; Golovin (yellow card) 90+2'	Report	Philippoteaux 70'; Denkey 82'; Sarr (yellow card) 90+1'	Stadium: Stade Louis II; Attendance: 7,438; Referee: Amaury Delerue

31 August 2019 4	Nîmes	3–0	Brest	Nîmes
20:00 CEST (UTC+2)	Ferhat 2'; Valls 33'; Fomba (yellow card) 79'; Denkey 90'	Report	Perraud (yellow card) 14'; Chardonnet (yellow card) 15'; Court (yellow card) 27'; Castelletto (yellow card) 71'	Stadium: Stade des Costières; Attendance: 12,488; Referee: Thomas Leonard

14 September 2019 5	Dijon	0–0	Nîmes	Dijon
20:00 CEST (UTC+2)	Mendyl (yellow card) 35'; Pereira (yellow card) 44'; Aguerd (yellow card) 77'	Report	Miguel (yellow card) 87'	Stadium: Stade Gaston Gérard; Attendance: 11,413; Referee: Stéphanie Frappart

21 September 2019 6	Nîmes	1–0	Toulouse	Nîmes
20:00 CEST (UTC+2)	Philippoteaux 39'; Deaux (yellow card) 43'	Report	Saïd (yellow card) 43'; Reynet (yellow card) 72'; Amian (yellow card) 75'; Diakité (red card) 81'	Stadium: Stade des Costières; Attendance: 12,258; Referee: Karim Abed

25 September 2019 7	Montpellier	1–0	Nîmes	Montpellier
19:00 CEST (UTC+2)	Souquet 31'; Mollet (yellow card) 49'; Delort (yellow card) 67'; Hilton (yellow card) 83'	Report	Deaux (yellow card) 21'; Miguel (yellow card) 53'; Landre (yellow card) 60'; Fomba (yellow card) 65'	Stadium: Stade de la Mosson; Attendance: 16,445; Referee: Benoît Bastien

29 September 2019 8	Nîmes	0–1	Saint-Étienne	Nîmes
17:00 CEST (UTC+2)	Alakouch (yellow card) 4'	Report	Cabaye (yellow card) 7'; Kolodziejczak (yellow card) 62'; Hamouma (yellow card) 64' (yellow-red card) 74'; Debuchy 68'	Stadium: Stade des Costières; Attendance: 13,802; Referee: Thomas Leonard

6 October 2019 9	Lille	2–2	Nîmes	Villeneuve-d'Ascq
15:00 CEST (UTC+2)	Rémy 12'; Osimhen (yellow card) 38', (goal) 79'; Fonte (yellow card) 45'; André (yellow card) 73'	Report	Ripart 45+5' (pen.); Philippoteaux (yellow card) 53'; Denkey 71'	Stadium: Stade Pierre-Mauroy; Attendance: 31,542; Referee: Mikael Lesage

19 October 2019 10	Nîmes	1–1	Amiens	Nîmes
20:00 CEST (UTC+2)	Fomba (yellow card) 24'; Martinez 41'; Briançon (yellow card) 81'	Report	Mendoza (yellow card) 29'; Guirassy (yellow card) 30'; Aleesami (yellow card) 76'; Calabresi 90+5'; Dibassy (yellow card) 90+6'	Stadium: Stade des Costières; Attendance: 12,189; Referee: Jérémy Stinat

26 October 2019 11	Reims	0–0	Nîmes	Reims
20:00 CEST (UTC+2)	Chavalerin (yellow card) 45+1'; Romao (yellow card) 59'; Foket (yellow card) 87'	Report	Fomba (yellow card) 39'	Stadium: Stade Auguste Delaune; Attendance: 12,329; Referee: Clément Turpin

9 November 2019 13	Strasbourg	4–1	Nîmes	Strasbourg
20:00 CET (UTC+1)	Ajorque 14'; Thomasson (yellow card) 16'; Mitrović (yellow card) 23'; Mothiba 45+2', 85'; Liénard 69'	Report	Miguel (yellow card) 40' (yellow-red card) 66'; Philippoteaux 48'	Stadium: Stade de la Meinau; Attendance: 24,745; Referee: Ruddy Buquet

23 November 2019 14	Angers	1–0	Nîmes	Angers
20:00 CET (UTC+1)	Bamba (yellow card) 45+1'; Mangani 67'; Pellenard (yellow card) 69'	Report	Fomba (yellow card) 34'	Stadium: Stade Raymond Kopa; Attendance: 8,714; Referee: Thomas Leonard

30 November 2019 15	Nîmes	1–1	Metz	Nîmes
20:00 CET (UTC+1)	Philippoteaux (yellow card) 46'; Ripart 61'	Report	Nguette (yellow card) 24'; Cohade (yellow card) 29'; Diallo 31'; Maïga (yellow card) 65'; Fofana (yellow card) 82'; Boye (yellow card) 90+1'; Boulaya (yellow card) 90+1'	Stadium: Stade des Costières; Attendance: 12,180; Referee: Hakim Ben El Hadj

3 December 2019 16	Bordeaux	6–0	Nîmes	Bordeaux
19:00 (Note: The Bordeaux v Nîmes was interrupted for 25 minutes because of the presence of supporters at the edge of the field.) CET (UTC+1)	Maja 25', 38', 53'; De Préville 58'; Jovanović (yellow card) 64'; Adli (yellow card) 66'; Otávio 77', 87'	Report	Alakouch (yellow card) 44'	Stadium: Matmut Atlantique; Attendance: 12,419; Referee: Clément Turpin

6 December 2019 17	Nîmes	0–4	Lyon	Nîmes
20:45 CET (UTC+1)	Valls (red card) 5'; Paquiez (yellow card) 38' (yellow-red card) 40'	Report	Depay 16' (pen.), 64'; Caqueret (yellow card) 17'; Traoré (yellow card) 50'; Aouar 71'; Andersen 79'	Stadium: Stade des Costières; Attendance: 12,801; Referee: Olivier Thual

14 December 2019 18	Nîmes	0–1	Nantes	Nîmes
20:00 CET (UTC+1)		Report	Louza 29'; Bamba (yellow card) 46'; Simon (yellow card) 68'; Pallois (yellow card) 81'	Stadium: Stade des Costières; Attendance: 12,098; Referee: Karim Abed

21 December 2019 19	Marseille	3–1	Nîmes	Marseille
20:45 CET (UTC+1)	Kamara (yellow card) 33'; Sanson (yellow card) 45+1'; Payet (yellow card) 45+2', (goal) 81'; Alakouch 47' (o.g.); Benedetto 65'	Report	Paquiez (yellow card) 26'; Sarr (yellow card) 63'; Briançon 90+2'	Stadium: Stade Vélodrome; Attendance: 59,043; Referee: François Letexier

11 January 2020 20	Nîmes	2–0	Reims	Nîmes
20:00 CET (UTC+1)	Ripart 16'; Martinez (yellow card) 78'; Benrahou 90+2'	Report	Romao (yellow card) 35' (yellow-red card) 57'; Suk (yellow card) 46'; Doumbia (yellow card) 55'; Kamara (yellow card) 63'	Stadium: Stade des Costières; Attendance: 11,867; Referee: Olivier Thual

15 January 2020 12	Nîmes	0–1	Rennes	Nîmes
19:00 CET (UTC+1)	Fomba (yellow card) 19'	Report	Traoré (yellow card) 15'; Hunou 64'; Salin (yellow card) 84'; Siebatcheu (yellow card) 89'	Stadium: Stade des Costières; Attendance: 12,388; Referee: Willy Delajod
Note: Match originally scheduled for 2 November, but postponed due to heavy rains, and rearranged for 15 January 2020.

25 January 2020 21	Saint-Étienne	2–1	Nîmes	Saint-Étienne
20:00 CET (UTC+1)	Khazri 3', 34' (pen.); Honorat (yellow card) 26'; Dioussé (yellow card) 62'; Trauco (yellow card) 90+6'	Report	Ferhat 45'; Miguel (yellow card) 69'; Sarr (yellow card) 90+3'	Stadium: Stade Geoffroy-Guichard; Attendance: 23,927; Referee: Jérémy Stinat

1 February 2020 22	Nîmes	3–1	Monaco	Nîmes
20:00 CET (UTC+1)	Martinez (yellow card) 11', (goal) 79'; Miguel 27', (yellow card) 45+3'; Philippoteaux 62'; Sarr (yellow card) 90+1'	Report	Ben Yedder 13'; Bakayoko (red card) 32'; Martins (red card) 32'; Fofana (yellow card) 33'; Silva (yellow card) 81'; Tchouaméni (yellow card) 86'	Stadium: Stade des Costières; Attendance: 12,580; Referee: Mikael Lesage

5 February 2020 23	Nîmes	2–0	Dijon	Nîmes
19:00 CET (UTC+1)	Benrahou 4'; Roux 44'	Report	Amalfitano (yellow card) 1'; Ndong (yellow card) 37'; Cádiz (yellow card) 87'	Stadium: Stade des Costières; Attendance: 11,705; Referee: Florent Batta

8 February 2020 24	Nice	1–3	Nîmes	Nice
20:00 CET (UTC+1)	Claude-Maurice 6'; Nsoki (yellow card) 33'; Boudaoui (red card) 49'; Danilo (yellow card) 53'	Report	Martinez (yellow card) 31'; Landre 43'; Philippoteaux 53'; Benrahou (yellow card) 65'; Paquiez (yellow card) 65'; Sarr (yellow card) 75'; Koné 90+1'	Stadium: Allianz Riviera; Attendance: 15,603; Referee: Antony Gautier

15 February 2020 25	Nîmes	1–0	Angers	Nîmes
20:00 CET (UTC+1)	Miguel (yellow card) 17'; Koné 80'	Report	Fulgini (yellow card) 3'; Ninga (yellow card) 15' (red card) 76'	Stadium: Stade des Costières; Attendance: 12,417; Referee: Karim Abed

23 February 2020 26	Rennes	2–1	Nîmes	Rennes
17:00 CET (UTC+1)	Niang 7', 89'	Report	Roux 1'; Briançon (red card) 53'; Paquiez (yellow card) 67'	Stadium: Roazhon Park; Attendance: 28,084; Referee: Stéphanie Frappart

28 February 2020 27	Nîmes	2–3	Marseille	Nîmes
20:45 CET (UTC+1)	Ferhat 5', (yellow card) 75'; Landre (yellow card) 14'; Sarr (yellow card) 78'; Deaux 90+1'; Paquiez (yellow card) 90+3'	Report	Benedetto 10', 36', 69'; Álvaro (yellow card) 71'; Payet (yellow card) 75'; Mandanda (yellow card) 90+1'	Stadium: Stade des Costières; Attendance: 13,755; Referee: Clément Turpin

7 March 2020 28	Metz	2–1	Nîmes	Metz
20:00 CET (UTC+1)	Nguette 7'; Boye 81'	Report	Deaux 49'	Stadium: Stade Saint-Symphorien; Attendance: 14,797; Referee: Ruddy Buquet

29	Nantes	Cancelled	Nîmes	Nantes
--:-- CEST (UTC+2)				Stadium: Stade de la Beaujoire; Attendance: 0

30	Nîmes	Cancelled	Bordeaux	Nîmes
--:-- CEST (UTC+2)				Stadium: Stade des Costières; Attendance: 0

31	Lyon	Cancelled	Nîmes	Décines-Charpieu
--:-- CEST (UTC+2)				Stadium: Parc Olympique Lyonnais; Attendance: 0

32	Nîmes	Cancelled	Montpellier	Nîmes
--:-- CEST (UTC+2)				Stadium: Stade des Costières; Attendance: 0

33	Amiens	Cancelled	Nîmes	Amiens
--:-- CEST (UTC+2)				Stadium: Stade de la Licorne

34	Nîmes	Cancelled	Lille	Nîmes
--:-- CEST (UTC+2)				Stadium: Stade des Costières

35	Toulouse	Cancelled	Nîmes	Toulouse
--:-- CEST (UTC+2)				Stadium: Stadium de Toulouse

36	Nîmes	Cancelled	Strasbourg	Nîmes
--:-- CEST (UTC+2)				Stadium: Stade des Costières

37	Brest	Cancelled	Nîmes	Brest
--:-- CEST (UTC+2)				Stadium: Stade Francis-Le Blé

38	Nîmes	Cancelled	Paris Saint-Germain	Nîmes
--:-- CEST (UTC+2)				Stadium: Stade des Costières

=== Coupe de France ===
4 January 2020 Round of 64	Tours FC	2–2 (a.e.t.) (2–4 p)	Nîmes	Tours
15:00 CET (UTC+1)	Da Silva 38'; Peron (yellow card) 44'; Camara 65'; Perraguin (yellow card) 66'	Report	Briançon 24'; Ripart 51' (pen.)	Stadium: Stade de la Vallée du Cher; Attendance: 3,510; Referee: Clément Turpin
	Penalties
	Mouangué (penalty scored); Dugain (penalty scored); Hidasse (penalty missed); Da Silva (penalty missed)		(penalty scored) Briançon; (penalty missed) Paquiez; (penalty scored) Stojanovski; (penalty scored) Denkey; (penalty scored) Valerio

19 January 2020 Round of 32	Dijon	5–0	Nîmes	Dijon
17:15 CET (UTC+1)	Cádiz 18' (pen.); Chafik (yellow card) 69'; Chouiar (yellow card) 72', (goal) 79'; Mavididi 75', 90'; Manga 86'	Report	Guessoum (yellow card) 40'; Sarr (yellow card) 59'; Paquiez (yellow card) 62'	Stadium: Stade Gaston Gérard; Attendance: 7,964; Referee: Hakim Ben El Hadj

=== Coupe de la Ligue ===
29 October 2019 Round of 32	Nîmes	3–0	Lens	Nîmes
18:45 CET (UTC+1)	Sene 24' (o.g.); Sainte-Luce 39'; Stojanovski 87' (pen.)	Report	Ducrocq (yellow card) 77'; Keita (yellow card) 79'	Stadium: Stade des Costières; Attendance: 6,284; Referee: Frank Schneider

18 December 2019 Round of 16	Nîmes	1–2	Saint-Étienne	Nîmes
21:05 CET (UTC+1)	Stojanovski 68'	Report	Benkhedim 38'; Edmilson 50'; Youssouf (yellow card) 81'	Stadium: Stade des Costières; Attendance: 4,240; Referee: Antony Gautier
