= 2020–21 Nîmes Olympique season =

Nîmes Olympique
2020–21 season
- President: Rani Assaf
- Head coach: Jérôme Arpinon (until 5 February); Pascal Plancque (from 5 February)
- Stadium: Stade des Costières
- Ligue 1: 19th (relegated)
- Coupe de France: Round of 64
- Top goalscorer: League: Renaud Ripart (11); All: Renaud Ripart (11)
- Biggest win: Nîmes 4–0 Brest
- Biggest defeat: Strasbourg 5–0 Nîmes
Home colours	Away colours	Third colours

The 2020–21 Nîmes Olympique season was the club's 83rd season in existence and its third consecutive season in the top flight of French football. In addition to the domestic league, Nîmes participated in this season's edition of the Coupe de France. The season covered the period from 1 July 2020 to 30 June 2021.

== Players ==
=== First-team squad ===
Note: Flags indicate national team as defined under FIFA eligibility rules; some limited exceptions apply. Players may hold more than one non-FIFA nationality.

No.	Pos.	Nation	Player
2	DF	FRA	Kelyan Guessoum
3	DF	NOR	Birger Meling
4	DF	FRA	Pablo Martinez
5	DF	FRA	Loïck Landre
6	MF	SEN	Sidy Sarr
7	MF	SWE	Niclas Eliasson
8	MF	FRA	Lucas Deaux
9	FW	FRA	Clément Depres
10	MF	ALG	Zinedine Ferhat
11	MF	BEN	Mattéo Ahlinvi
12	MF	FRA	Lamine Fomba
13	FW	ALG	Karim Aribi
14	MF	FRA	Antoine Valério
15	DF	FRA	Gaëtan Paquiez
16	GK	FRA	Lucas Dias

No.	Pos.	Nation	Player
17	MF	BIH	Haris Duljević
18	MF	PAR	Andrés Cubas
19	FW	FRA	Lucas Buadés
20	FW	FRA	Renaud Ripart (vice-captain)
21	DF	FRA	Patrick Burner
22	MF	MAR	Yassine Benrahou
23	DF	FRA	Anthony Briançon (captain)
24	FW	MAR	Sami Ben Amar
25	FW	FRA	Nolan Roux
26	DF	FRA	Florian Miguel
27	DF	JPN	Naomichi Ueda (on loan from Cercle Brugge)
28	FW	SEN	Moussa Koné
29	DF	FRA	Sofiane Alakouch
30	GK	FRA	Baptiste Reynet

=== Out on loan ===
Note: Flags indicate national team as defined under FIFA eligibility rules; some limited exceptions apply. Players may hold more than one non-FIFA nationality.

No. / Pos. / Nation / Player; — / DF / FRA / Théo Sainte-Luce (on loan to Red Star until 30 June 2021)	No. / Pos. / Nation / Player; — / FW / MKD / Vlatko Stojanovski (to Chambly until 30 June 2021)

== Pre-season and friendlies ==
Win Draw Loss

24 July 2020 Friendly	Strasbourg (France)	1–0	(France) Nîmes	Évian-les-Bains, France
17:00 CEST (UTC+2)	Mothiba 88' (pen.)			Stadium: Stade Camille-Fournier

31 July 2020 Friendly	Grenoble (France)	2–0	(France) Nîmes	Saint-Marcellin, France
17:00 CEST (UTC+2)	Ondaan 65'; Diallo 90'			Stadium: Stade La Saulaie

4 August 2020 Friendly	Rodez (France)	1–1	(France) Nîmes	Nîmes, France
17:00 CEST (UTC+2)	Bonnet 66'		Philippoteaux 49'	Stadium: Sports Complex La Bastide

9 August 2020 Friendly	Nîmes (France)	0–1	(France) Marseille	Nîmes, France
20:00 CEST (UTC+2)			Ćaleta-Car 31'; Kamara (yellow card) 69'	Stadium: Stade des Costières; Referee: Stéphanie Frappart

15 August 2020 Friendly	Dijon (France)	Cancelled	(France) Nîmes	Dijon, France
14:00 CEST (UTC+2)				Stadium: Stade Gaston Gérard

4 September 2020 Friendly	Marseille (France)	2–2	(France) Nîmes	Marseille, France
11:00 CEST (UTC+2)	Lopez 5'; Rongier 8'		Koné 15'; Benrahou 48'	Stadium: Centre d'entraînement Robert Louis-Dreyfus

== Competitions ==
=== Overview ===
Competition	First match	Last match	Starting round	Final position	Record							
Competition	First match	Last match	Starting round	Final position	Pld	W	D	L	GF	GA	GD	Win %
Ligue 1	23 August 2020	23 May 2021	Matchday 1	19th	38	9	8	21	40	71	−31	23.68
Coupe de France	10 February 2021		Round of 64	Round of 64	1	0	0	1	1	3	−2	0.00
Total					39	9	8	22	41	74	−33	23.08

Source: Soccerway

=== Ligue 1 ===
==== League table ====
Pos	Team	Pld	W	D	L	GF	GA	GD	Pts	Qualification or relegation
16	Lorient	38	11	9	18	50	68	−18	42	
17	Brest	38	11	8	19	50	66	−16	41	
18	Nantes (O)	38	9	13	16	47	55	−8	40	Qualification for the Relegation play-offs
19	Nîmes (R)	38	9	8	21	40	71	−31	35	Relegation to the Ligue 2
20	Dijon (R)	38	4	9	25	25	73	−48	21	Relegation to the Ligue 2

Source: Ligue 1
Rules for classification: 1) Points; 2) Goal difference; 3) Goals scored; 4) Head-to-head goal difference; 5) Fairplay ranking.
(O) Play-off winners; (R) Relegated

==== Results summary ====
Overall								Home						Away					
Pld	W	D	L	GF	GA	GD	Pts	W	D	L	GF	GA	GD	W	D	L	GF	GA	GD
38	9	8	21	40	71	−31	35	3	5	11	22	39	−17	6	3	10	18	32	−14

Source: Ligue 1

==== Results by round ====
Round	1	2	3	4	5	6	7	8	9	10	11	12	13	14	15	16	17	18	19	20	21	22	23	24	25	26	27	28	29	30	31	32	33	34	35	36	37	38
Ground	H	A	H	A	H	A	H	A	H	H	A	A	H	A	H	A	H	A	H	A	H	A	A	H	A	H	H	A	H	A	H	A	H	A	H	A	H	A
Result	W	L	L	D	D	W	L	L	L	L	W	L	L	L	L	D	L	L	L	W	W	L	L	L	W	W	D	L	D	W	L	D	D	L	D	W	L	L
Position	1	7	13	15	14	13	16	16	18	18	15	16	16	18	19	18	20	20	20	18	19	20	20	20	19	17	18	18	19	18	18	18	18	19	19	19	19	19

Source: Ligue 1
A = Away; H = Home; W = Win; D = Draw; L = Loss

==== Matches ====
The league fixtures were announced on 9 July 2020.

23 August 2020 1	Nîmes	4–0	Brest	Nîmes
15:00 CEST (UTC+2)	Denkey 8'; Meling 31'; Deaux (yellow card) 37'; Benrahou (yellow card) 42'; Philippoteaux 69'; Koné 84'	Report	Faussurier (yellow card) 35'; Duverne (yellow card) 50'; Pierre-Gabriel (yellow card) 65'; Chardonnet (red card) 77'	Stadium: Stade des Costières; Referee: Jérémie Pignard

30 August 2020 2	Nantes	2–1	Nîmes	Nantes
15:00 CEST (UTC+2)	Fábio (yellow card) 9' (yellow-red card) 87'; Girotto 11'; Louza 27' (pen.), (red card) 47'; Lafont (yellow card) 90+3'	Report	Denkey (yellow card) 3'; Landre (yellow card) 35'; Ferhat 57'	Stadium: Stade de la Beaujoire; Referee: Hakim Ben El Hadj

13 September 2020 3	Nîmes	2–4	Rennes	Nîmes
15:00 CEST (UTC+2)	Cubas 36'; Denkey (yellow card) 50'; Ferhat 55'; Ripart (yellow card) 72'	Report	Guirassy 12', 39'; Maouassa (yellow card) 27'; Camavinga (yellow card) 60'; Nzonzi (yellow card) 60'; Aguerd 72'; Bourigeaud (yellow card) 79', (goal) 90+7'; Da Silva (yellow card) 85'; Salin (yellow card) 90+5'	Stadium: Stade des Costières; Referee: Mikaël Lesage

18 September 2020 4	Lyon	0–0	Nîmes	Décines-Charpieu
21:00 CEST (UTC+2)	Cornet (yellow card) 34'; Dubois (yellow card) 52'; Jean Lucas (yellow card) 90+4'	Report	Cubas (yellow card) 48'; Fomba (yellow card) 68'	Stadium: Parc Olympique Lyonnais; Referee: Amaury Delerue

27 September 2020 5	Nîmes	1–1	Lens	Nîmes
15:00 CEST (UTC+2)	Ferhat 87'	Report	Gradit (yellow card) 2'; Ganago 34'; Medina (yellow card) 50'; Perez (yellow card) 90+5'	Stadium: Stade des Costières; Referee: Frank Schneider

4 October 2020 6	Montpellier	0–1	Nîmes	Montpellier
13:00 CEST (UTC+2)	Souquet (yellow card) 43'; Savanier (yellow card) 90'	Report	Briançon (yellow card) 34'; Ripart 84'	Stadium: Stade de la Mosson; Referee: Benoît Millot

16 October 2020 7	Nîmes	0–4	Paris Saint-Germain	Nîmes
21:00 CEST (UTC+2)	Deaux (yellow card) 6'; Landre (red card) 12'	Report	Rafinha (yellow card) 18'; Gueye (yellow card) 20'; Mbappé 32', 83'; Florenzi 78'; Sarabia 88'	Stadium: Stade des Costières; Referee: Clément Turpin

25 October 2020 8	Bordeaux	2–0	Nîmes	Bordeaux
15:00 CET (UTC+1)	Otávio (yellow card) 36'; Maja (yellow card) 42'; Briand (yellow card) 69', (goal) 79' (pen.); Oudin 81'	Report	Briançon (yellow card) 46'; Miguel (yellow card) 77'; Reynet (yellow card) 80'	Stadium: Matmut Atlantique; Referee: Bastien Dechepy

1 November 2020 9	Nîmes	0–1	Metz	Nîmes
15:00 CET (UTC+1)	Roux (yellow card) 40'; Fomba (yellow card) 45+3'; Martinez (yellow card) 65'	Report	Gueye 15', (yellow card) 57'; Udol (red card) 44'; Centonze (yellow card) 90+3'	Stadium: Stade des Costières; Attendance: 0 Referee: Amaury Delerue

8 November 2020 10	Nîmes	1–5	Angers	Nîmes
15:00 CET (UTC+1)	Benrahou (yellow card) 39'; Deaux (yellow card) 55'; Koné 90+1'	Report	Pereira Lage 1', (yellow card) 14'; Mangani (yellow card) 17'; Bahoken 23', 56'; Amadou (yellow card) 54'; Coulibaly (yellow card) 78'; Diony 82' (pen.); Cabot 90+3'; Manceau (yellow card) 90+4'	Stadium: Stade des Costières; Attendance: 0 Referee: Frank Schneider

22 November 2020 11	Reims	0–1	Nîmes	Reims
15:00 CET (UTC+1)	Sierhuis (yellow card) 19'; Munetsi (yellow card) 47'; Berisha (yellow card) 82'	Report	Ripart (yellow card) 34', (goal) 62' (pen.)	Stadium: Stade Auguste-Delaune; Attendance: 0 Referee: Jérémy Stinat

29 November 2020 12	Monaco	3–0	Nîmes	Monaco
15:00 CET (UTC+1)	Diop 19'; Martins 75'; Volland 77'; Fofana (yellow card) 83'	Report	Denkey (yellow card) 4'; Deaux (red card) 69'	Stadium: Stade Louis II; Attendance: 0 Referee: Antony Gautier

4 December 2020 13	Nîmes	0–2	Marseille	Nîmes
21:00 CET (UTC+1)	Landre (yellow card) 44'; Cubas (yellow card) 74' (yellow-red card) 77'	Report	Amavi (yellow card) 1'; Cuisance (yellow card) 21'; Ćaleta-Car (yellow card) 40'; Álvaro (yellow card) 44'; Benedetto 57'; Germain 84'	Stadium: Stade des Costières; Attendance: 0 Referee: Willy Delajod

13 December 2020 14	Lorient	3–0	Nîmes	Lorient
15:00 CET (UTC+1)	Boisgard 2'; Laurienté (yellow card) 19'; Hamel 29' (pen.); Gravillon (yellow card) 55'; Wissa 90'	Report		Stadium: Stade du Moustoir; Attendance: 0 Referee: Karim Abed

16 December 2020 15	Nîmes	0–2	Nice	Nîmes
19:00 CET (UTC+1)	Roux (yellow card) 60'	Report	Schneiderlin (yellow card) 28' (yellow-red card) 57'; Ndoye 85'; Claude-Maurice 90+3'	Stadium: Stade des Costières; Attendance: 0 Referee: Ruddy Buquet

20 December 2020 16	Saint-Étienne	2–2	Nîmes	Saint-Étienne
15:00 CET (UTC+1)	Moukoudi 8'; Hamouma (yellow card) 26'; Boudebouz (penalty missed) 36'; Nordin 63'; Neyou (yellow card) 82'	Report	Ahlinvi 14'; Eliasson (yellow card) 30'; Reynet (yellow card) 35'; Ripart 56' (pen.); Sarr (yellow card) 67'	Stadium: Stade Geoffroy-Guichard; Attendance: 0 Referee: Mikael Lesage

23 December 2020 17	Nîmes	1–3	Dijon	Nîmes
19:00 CET (UTC+1)	Ahlinvi 31'; Alakouch (yellow card) 43'; Ferhat (yellow card) 43'; Miguel (red card) 76'	Report	Baldé (yellow card) 14', (goal) 77'; Konaté 75', 90+3'; Celina (yellow card) 90+2'	Stadium: Stade des Costières; Attendance: 0 Referee: Jérémie Pignard

6 January 2021 18	Strasbourg	5–0	Nîmes	Strasbourg
19:00 CET (UTC+1)	Aholou (yellow card) 8'; Ajorque 36', 51', (penalty missed) 58'; Diallo 38'; Lala 45+1' (pen.); Waris 90' (pen.)	Report	Deaux (yellow card) 57'; Fomba (yellow card) 89'	Stadium: Stade de la Meinau; Attendance: 0 Referee: Benoît Millot

9 January 2021 19	Nîmes	0–1	Lille	Nîmes
21:00 CET (UTC+1)		Report	Bradarić (yellow card) 19'; Yılmaz 29'; Soumaré (yellow card) 34'; Xeka (yellow card) 90+1'	Stadium: Stade des Costières; Attendance: 0 Referee: Jérôme Brisard

16 January 2021 20	Marseille	1–2	Nîmes	Marseille
17:00 CET (UTC+1)	Thauvin (penalty missed) 35'; Rongier (yellow card) 61'; Ćaleta-Car (yellow card) 68'; Benedetto 85'	Report	Cubas (yellow card) 20'; Eliasson 55', 58'; Briançon (yellow card) 90'	Stadium: Stade Vélodrome; Attendance: 0 Referee: Jérémy Stinat

31 January 2021 22	Angers	3–1	Nîmes	Angers
15:00 CET (UTC+1)	Capelle 20'; Coulibaly 35', (yellow card) 43'; Diony 55'	Report	Fomba (yellow card) 18'; Alakouch (yellow card) 27'; Cubas (yellow card) 34'; Ripart 41' (pen.)	Stadium: Stade Raymond Kopa; Attendance: 0 Referee: Ruddy Buquet

3 February 2021 23	Paris Saint-Germain	3–0	Nîmes	Paris
21:00 CET (UTC+1)	Di María 18'; Sarabia 36'; Mbappé 68'	Report	Meling (yellow card) 21'	Stadium: Parc des Princes; Attendance: 0 Referee: François Letexier

7 February 2021 24	Nîmes	3–4	Monaco	Nîmes
15:00 CET (UTC+1)	Deaux 23'; Ferhat 32'; Meling (yellow card) 37'; Eliasson 81'	Report	Golovin 3', 12', 62'; Ballo-Touré (yellow card) 4'; Badiashile (yellow card) 58'; Volland 77'	Stadium: Stade des Costières; Attendance: 0 Referee: Clément Turpin

14 February 2021 25	Dijon	0–2	Nîmes	Dijon
15:00 CET (UTC+1)	Chouiar (yellow card) 49'; Lautoa (yellow card) 61'; Sammaritano (yellow card) 79', (red card) 90'; Ndong (yellow card) 90+4'	Report	Ferhat (yellow card) 42'; Ripart 76'; Eliasson 87'	Stadium: Stade Gaston Gérard; Attendance: 0 Referee: Aurélien Petit

21 February 2021 26	Nîmes	2–0	Bordeaux	Nîmes
15:00 CET (UTC+1)	Meling 14'; Ripart 71'	Report	Kalu (yellow card) 49'; Adli (yellow card) 53'; Benito (red card) 68'; Zerkane (yellow card) 87'	Stadium: Stade des Costières; Attendance: 0 Referee: Willy Delajod

24 February 2021 21	Nîmes	1–0	Lorient	Nîmes
19:00 CET (UTC+1)	Guessoum (yellow card) 65'; Ripart 88' (pen.); Reynet (yellow card) 89'	Report	Moffi (yellow card) 39'; Boisgard (yellow card) 61'; Grbić (yellow card) 90+1'; Laporte (yellow card) 90+3'	Stadium: Stade des Costières; Attendance: 0 Referee: Mikael Lesage
Note: The match originally scheduled for 24 January 2021, but postponed after more than ten Lorient players tested positive for COVID-19.

28 February 2021 27	Nîmes	1–1	Nantes	Nîmes
15:00 CET (UTC+1)	Miguel (yellow card) 5' (yellow-red card) 90+1'; Koné 76'	Report	Blas 27'; Appiah (yellow card) 58'	Stadium: Stade des Costières; Attendance: 0 Referee: Florent Batta

3 March 2021 28	Nice	2–1	Nîmes	Nice
19:00 CET (UTC+1)	Gouiri 4'; Atal (yellow card) 54'; Claude-Maurice 75'; Schneiderlin (yellow card) 79'; Lotomba (yellow card) 90+3'	Report	Landre 50'; Meling (yellow card) 55'; Fomba (yellow card) 60'; Guessoum (yellow card) 90+1'	Stadium: Allianz Riviera; Attendance: 0 Referee: Hakim Ben El Hadj

14 March 2021 29	Nîmes	1–1	Montpellier	Nîmes
13:00 CET (UTC+1)	Alakouch (yellow card) 47'; Koné 63'; Fomba (yellow card) 67'	Report	Delort 79'	Stadium: Stade des Costières; Attendance: 0 Referee: Eric Wattellier

21 March 2021 30	Lille	1–2	Nîmes	Villeneuve-d'Ascq
17:05 CET (UTC+1)	Xeka 20'; Bamba (yellow card) 53'; Soumaré (yellow card) 80'	Report	Koné 12'; Ripart 45'	Stadium: Stade Pierre-Mauroy; Attendance: 0 Referee: Frank Schneider

4 April 2021 31	Nîmes	0–2	Saint-Étienne	Nîmes
17:05 CEST (UTC+2)	Alakouch (yellow card) 11'; Ripart (yellow card) 37', (penalty missed) 87'; Cubas (yellow card) 43'; Duljević (yellow card) 89'; Briançon (yellow card) 89'	Report	Khazri 23', (yellow card) 45+1'; Bouanga 66', (yellow card) 76'	Stadium: Stade des Costières; Attendance: 0 Referee: Thomas Léonard

11 April 2021 32	Brest	1–1	Nîmes	Brest
15:00 CEST (UTC+2)	Chardonnet 26'; Mounié (yellow card) 46'; Perraud (yellow card) 47'; Magnetti (yellow card) 50'; Jean Lucas (yellow card) 86'	Report	Koné 11'; Fomba (yellow card) 22'	Stadium: Stade Francis-Le Blé; Attendance: 0 Referee: Willy Delajod

18 April 2021 33	Nîmes	1–1	Strasbourg	Nîmes
15:00 CEST (UTC+2)	Ripart 55' (pen.)	Report	Aholou (yellow card) 29'; Guilbert (red card) 47'; Thomasson (yellow card) 61'; Liénard (penalty missed) 82', 82'	Stadium: Stade des Costières; Attendance: 0 Referee: Antony Gautier

25 April 2021 34	Lens	2–1	Nîmes	Lens
15:00 CEST (UTC+2)	Ganago 17'; Sylla (red card) 24'; Badé (yellow card) 34'; Haïdara 76'	Report	Ferhat 52' (pen.); Koné (yellow card) 81'; Miguel (yellow card) 90+1'	Stadium: Stade Bollaert-Delelis; Attendance: 0 Referee: Aurélien Petit

2 May 2021 35	Nîmes	2–2	Reims	Nîmes
15:00 CEST (UTC+2)	Paquiez (yellow card) 45'; Ripart 47'; Koné 71', (yellow card) 72'	Report	Zeneli (yellow card) 21'; Mbuku 30'; De Smet (yellow card) 56'; Flips 80'	Stadium: Stade des Costières; Attendance: 0 Referee: Benoît Millot

9 May 2021 36	Metz	0–3	Nîmes	Metz
15:00 CEST (UTC+2)	Maïga (yellow card) 1'	Report	Fomba 61', (yellow card) 70'; Ripart 67' (pen.); Meling (yellow card) 69'; Ferhat 89'	Stadium: Stade Saint-Symphorien; Attendance: 0 Referee: François Letexier

16 May 2021 37	Nîmes	2–5	Lyon	Nîmes
21:00 CEST (UTC+2)	Koné 5', 62'	Report	Paquetá 8', 24'; Depay 20'; Aouar 55'; Slimani 87'	Stadium: Stade des Costières; Attendance: 0 Referee: Ruddy Buquet

23 May 2021 38	Rennes	2–0	Nîmes	Rennes
21:00 CEST (UTC+2)	Guirassy 24'; Bourigeaud 51'; Ugochukwu (yellow card) 89'	Report		Stadium: Roazhon Park; Attendance: 0 Referee: Willy Delajod

=== Coupe de France ===
10 February 2021 Round of 64	Nîmes	1–3	Nice	Nîmes
17:00 CET (UTC+1)	Duljević 36'	Report	Lopes 13', 29'; Lees-Melou 82'	Stadium: Stade des Costières; Attendance: 0 Referee: Amaury Delerue

== Statistics ==
=== Goalscorers ===
As of 4 December 2020

Rank	No.	Pos	Nat	Name	Ligue 1	Coupe de France	Total
1	10	MF	(Algeria)	Zinedine Ferhat	3	0	3
2	20	FW	(France)	Renaud Ripart	2	0	2
2	28	FW	(Senegal)	Moussa Koné	2	0	2
4	3	DF	(Norway)	Birger Meling	1	0	1
4	7	MF	(France)	Romain Philippoteaux	1	0	1
4	18	MF	(Paraguay)	Andrés Cubas	1	0	1
4	27	FW	(Togo)	Kévin Denkey	1	0	1
Totals					11	0	11
