= Lucas Dias =

Lucas Dias may refer to:

- Lucas Dias (basketball) (born 1995), Brazilian basketball player
- Lucas Dias (footballer, born 1997), Brazilian football forward
- Lucas Dias (footballer, born 1999), French football goalkeeper
- Lucas Dias (soccer, born 2003), Canadian soccer midfielder
