= Lamine Fomba =

French footballer (born 1998)

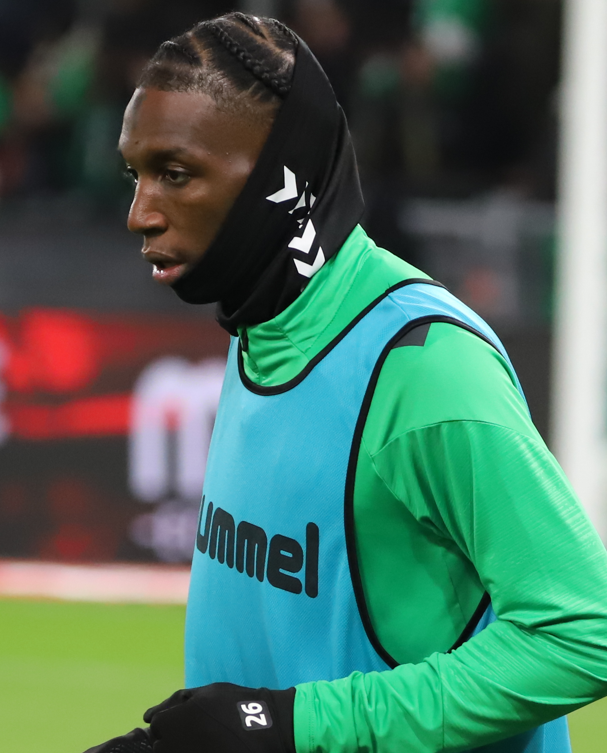
- Fomba playing for Saint-Étienne in 2024

Personal information
- Date of birth: 26 January 1998 (age 28)
- Place of birth: Rosny-sous-Bois, France
- Height: 1.88 m (6 ft 2 in)
- Position: Midfielder

Team information
- Current team: Servette
- Number: 11

Youth career
- 2007–2011: Montreuil Red Star
- 2011–2016: Auxerre

Senior career*
Years	Team	Apps	(Gls)
2015–2019	Auxerre B	38	(4)
2016–2019	Auxerre	38	(3)
2019–2023	Nîmes	104	(4)
2023–2025	Saint-Étienne	51	(0)
2025–	Servette	34	(1)

International career
2015–2016	France U17	6	(1)
- * Club domestic league appearances and goals as of 28 September 2026

Lamine Fomba (born 26 January 1998) is a French professional footballer who plays as a midfielder for Swiss Super League club Servette. He is a former under-17 international for France.

== Personal life ==
Lamine Fomba was born in Rosny-sous-Bois, France. He holds French, Malagasy and Malian nationalities.

== Club career ==
Fomba signed his first professional contract for Auxerre on 13 May 2016. Fomba made his professional debut for Auxerre in a 2–0 loss to AC Ajaccio on 20 September 2016 in the Ligue 2.

On 28 January 2023, Fomba signed a contract with Saint-Étienne until June 2025.

On 25 July 2025, Fomba moved to Servette in Switzerland on a three-year contract.

== International career ==
Fomba represented the France national under-17 football team at the 2015 FIFA U-17 World Cup, making 2 appearances.

== Career statistics ==
As of match played 2 June 2024

Appearances and goals by club, season, and competition
Club	Season	League			National cup		Other		Total	
Club	Season	Division	Apps	Goals	Apps	Goals	Apps	Goals	Apps	Goals
Auxerre B	2014–15	CFA 2	2	0	—		—		2	0
Auxerre B	2015–16	CFA	4	1	—		—		4	1
Auxerre B	2016–17	CFA	7	1	—		—		7	1
Auxerre B	2017–18	National 3	20	2	—		—		20	2
Auxerre B	2018–19	National 3	5	0	—		—		5	0
Auxerre B	Total		38	4	—		—		38	4
Auxerre	2016–17	Ligue 2	2	0	0	0	0	0	2	0
Auxerre	2017–18	Ligue 2	6	0	0	0	0	0	6	0
Auxerre	2018–19	Ligue 2	28	3	1	0	1 (Note: Appearances in the Coupe de la Ligue)	0	30	3
Auxerre	2019–20	Ligue 2	2	0	0	0	0	0	2	0
Auxerre	Total		38	3	1	0	1	0	40	3
Nîmes	2019–20	Ligue 1	20	0	1	0	0	0	21	0
Nîmes	2020–21	Ligue 1	32	1	1	0	—		33	1
Nîmes	2021–22	Ligue 2	34	2	2	0	—		36	2
Nîmes	2022–23	Ligue 2	18	1	2	0	—		20	1
Nîmes	Total		104	4	6	0	—		110	4
Saint-Étienne	2022–23	Ligue 2	16	0	0	0	—		16	0
Saint-Étienne	2023–24	Ligue 2	28	0	2	0	2 (Note: Appearances in the Ligue 1 relegation/promotion play-offs)	0	32	0
Saint-Étienne	Total		44	0	2	0	2	0	48	0
Career totals			224	11	9	0	3	0	236	11
