= Yassine Benrahou =

French-Moroccan footballer (born 1999)

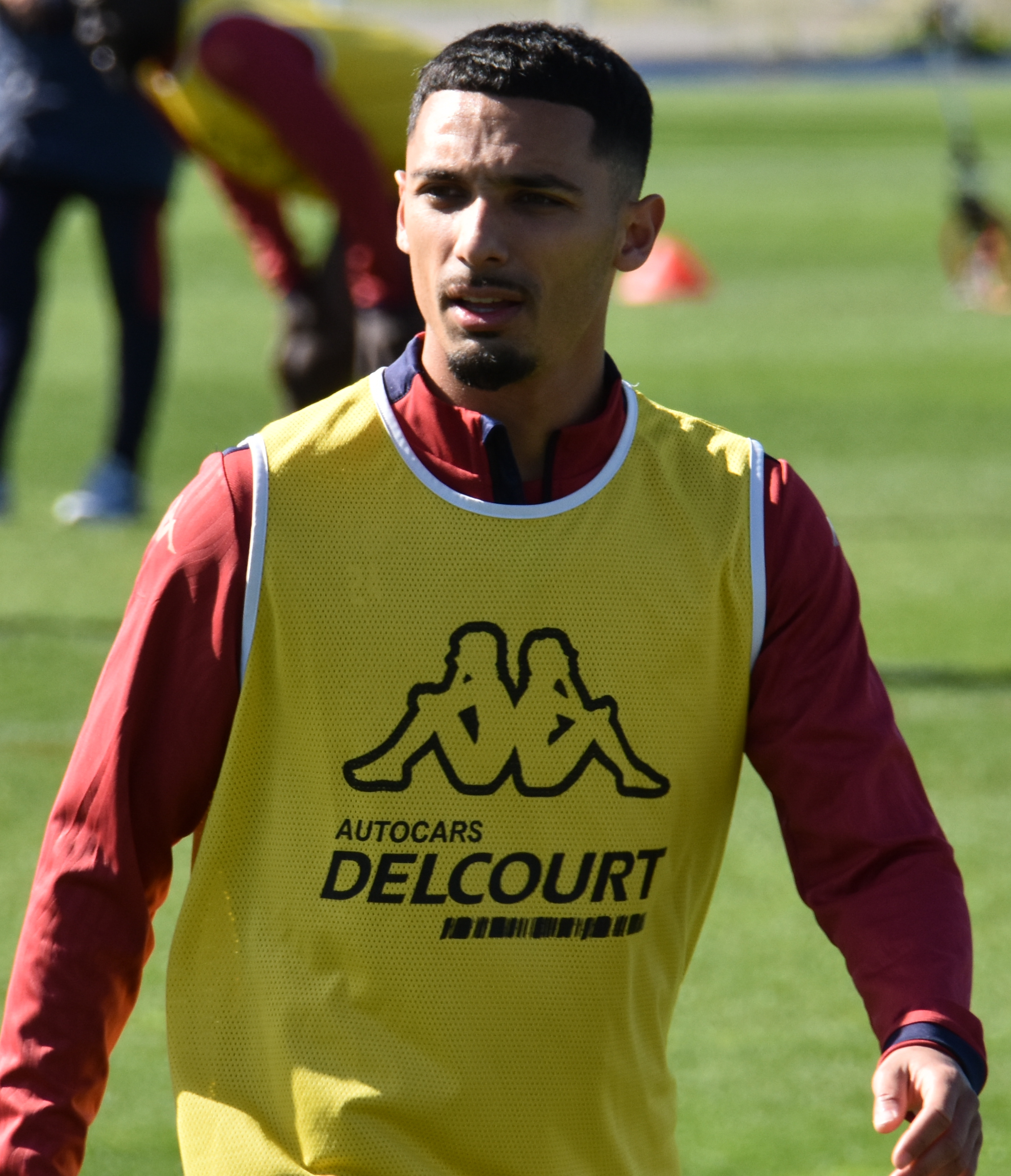
- Benrahou with SM Caen in 2025

Personal information
- Full name: Yassine Otmane Benrahou
- Date of birth: 24 January 1999 (age 27)
- Place of birth: Le Blanc-Mesnil, France
- Height: 1.72 m (5 ft 8 in)
- Position: Midfielder

Team information
- Current team: Manisa
- Number: 20

Youth career
- 2005–2008: Aulnay FC
- 2008–2009: Villepinte FC
- 2009–2011: AS Bondy
- 2011–2012: Paris Saint-Germain
- 2012: AS Bondy
- 2012–2014: Créteil
- 2014–2019: Bordeaux

Senior career*
Years	Team	Apps	(Gls)
2016–2020	Bordeaux B	45	(10)
2019–2020	Bordeaux	10	(0)
2019–2020	→ Nîmes (loan)	9	(2)
2020–2023	Nîmes	66	(10)
2023–2025	Hajduk Split	52	(9)
2025	→ Caen (loan)	7	(0)
2025–	Manisa	24	(5)

International career
2014–2015	France U16	6	(2)
2016	France U17	1	(0)
2018	Morocco U20	1	(0)
- * Club domestic league appearances and goals as of 6 May 2026

Yassine Otmane Benrahou (born 24 January 1999) is a professional footballer who plays as midfielder for Turkish TFF 1. Lig club Manisa. Born in France, he previously represented France and Morocco at youth international level.

== Club career ==
On 6 August 2018, Benrahou signed his first professional contract with Bordeaux, keeping him at the club for three seasons. He made his professional debut with in a 3–2 Ligue 1 loss to Lyon on 26 April 2019.

Benrahou joined Nîmes permanently in June 2020, after he spent the second half of the 2019–20 season on loan at the club. He signed a three-year contract, while Nîmes paid a transfer fee of €1.5 million to Bordeaux.

On 26 January 2023, Benrahou joined Hajduk Split signing a contract until summer 2026 with an option for one more year. On 27 January 2025, Benrahou was loaned to Caen for the rest of the 2024–25 season.

== International career ==
Benrahou was born in France to a Moroccan father and Algerian mother. A former youth international for France, he switched and represented the Morocco U20s in a pair of 2019 Africa U-20 Cup of Nations qualification matches in March 2018.

== Career statistics ==
=== Club ===
As of match played 12 November 2023

Appearances and goals by club, season and competition
Club	Season	League			National cup (Note: Includes Coupe de France, Croatian Football Cup)		Europe		Other		Total	
Club	Season	Division	Apps	Goals	Apps	Goals	Apps	Goals	Apps	Goals	Apps	Goals
Bordeaux	2018–19	Ligue 1	4	0	—		—		—		4	0
Bordeaux	2019–20	Ligue 1	6	0	0	0	—		—		6	0
Bordeaux	Total		10	0	0	0	—		—		6	0
Nîmes (loan)	2019–20	Ligue 1	9	2	1	0	—		—		10	2
Nîmes	2020–21	Ligue 1	23	0	0	0	—		—		23	0
Nîmes	2021–22	Ligue 2	34	10	3	2	—		—		37	12
Nîmes	2022–23	Ligue 2	9	0	1	0	—		—		10	0
Nîmes	Total		66	10	4	2	—		—		70	12
Hajduk Split	2022–23	Prva HNL	17	4	2	0	—		—		19	4
Hajduk Split	2023–24	Prva HNL	13	0	2	2	1 (Note: Appearance in UEFA Europa Conference League)	0	1 (Note: Appearance in Croatian Football Super Cup)	0	17	2
Hajduk Split	Total		30	4	4	2	1	0	1	0	36	6
Career total			115	16	9	4	1	0	1	0	126	20

== Honours ==
Hajduk Split

- Croatian Football Cup: 2022–23
