= Sami Ben Amar =

Moroccan footballer (born 1998)

Personal information
- Date of birth: 2 March 1998 (age 28)
- Place of birth: Nice, France
- Height: 1.85 m (6 ft 1 in)
- Position: Forward

Team information
- Current team: Riviera

Youth career
- 2004–2008: FC de Carros
- 2008–2012: Nice
- 2012–2017: Bastia

Senior career*
| Years | Team | Apps | (Gls) |
| 2016–2017 | Bastia II | 8 | (1) |
| 2017–2021 | Nîmes | 6 | (0) |
| 2017–2021 | Nîmes II | 50 | (18) |
| 2021 | Dundalk | 13 | (1) |
| 2022–2023 | US Mondorf-les-Bains | 7 | (1) |
| 2023 | Lyon La Duchère | 14 | (4) |
| 2023–2024 | AS Cagnes-Le Cros | 7 | (4) |
| 2024–2025 | Bourgoin-Jallieu | 27 | (3) |
| 2025– | Riviera | 24 | (6) |

International career^{‡}
| 2017 | Morocco U20 | 1 | (0) |
- * Club domestic league appearances and goals as of 30 June 2026 ‡ National team caps and goals as of 27 January 2018

Sami Ben Amar (born 2 March 1998) is a professional footballer who plays as a forward for Championnat National 2 club Riviera. Born in France, he is a former under-20 international for Morocco.

== Club career ==
Ben Amar made his professional debut for Nîmes in a 2–0 Ligue 2 loss to Gazélec Ajaccio on 23 January 2018. He signed for League of Ireland Premier Division side Dundalk on the 17th August 2021. He made his debut for the club 3 days later in a 2–1 defeat to Drogheda United in the Louth Derby at Oriel Park. His first goal for the club came on 27 August 2021 when he opened the scoring in a 5–1 win over St Mochta's in the Second Round of the FAI Cup. In August 2022, Ben Amar signed for Luxembourg National Division club US Mondorf-les-Bains.

== International career ==
Ben Amar debuted for the Morocco national under-20 football team in a 1–1 friendly tie with the France U20s on 8 November 2017.

== Career statistics ==
As of match played on 16 May 2026

Appearances and goals by club, season and competition
| Club | Season | League | | | National Cup (Note: Includes Coupe de France & FAI Cup) | | League Cup (Note: Includes Coupe de la Ligue & League of Ireland Cup) | | Other | | Total | |
| Club | Season | Division | Apps | Goals | Apps | Goals | Apps | Goals | Apps | Goals | Apps | Goals |
|---|---|---|---|---|---|---|---|---|---|---|---|---|
| Bastia | 2016–17 | Ligue 1 | 0 | 0 | 0 | 0 | 0 | 0 | — | | 0 | 0 |
| Bastia II (loan) | 2016–17 | Championnat National 3 | 8 | 1 | — | | — | | — | | 8 | 1 |
| Nîmes | 2017–18 | Ligue 2 | 3 | 0 | 0 | 0 | 0 | 0 | — | | 3 | 0 |
| Nîmes | 2018–19 | Ligue 1 | 0 | 0 | 0 | 0 | 0 | 0 | — | | 0 | 0 |
| Nîmes | 2019–20 | Ligue 1 | 2 | 0 | 1 | 0 | 1 | 0 | — | | 4 | 0 |
| Nîmes | 2020–21 | Ligue 1 | 1 | 0 | 0 | 0 | 0 | 0 | — | | 1 | 0 |
| Nîmes | Total | | 6 | 0 | 1 | 0 | 1 | 0 | — | | 8 | 0 |
| Nîmes II | 2017–18 | Championnat National 3 | 13 | 7 | — | | — | | — | | 13 | 7 |
| Nîmes II | 2018–19 | Championnat National 2 | 20 | 6 | — | | — | | — | | 20 | 6 |
| Nîmes II | 2019–20 | Championnat National 2 | 11 | 3 | — | | — | | — | | 11 | 3 |
| Nîmes II | 2020–21 | Championnat National 3 | 6 | 2 | — | | — | | — | | 6 | 2 |
| Nîmes II | Total | | 50 | 18 | — | | — | | — | | 50 | 18 |
| Dundalk | 2021 | LOI Premier Division | 13 | 1 | 3 | 1 | — | | — | | 16 | 2 |
| US Mondorf-les-Bains | 2022–23 | Luxembourg National Division | 7 | 1 | 0 | 0 | — | | — | | 7 | 1 |
| Lyon La Duchère | 2022–23 | Championnat National 2 | 14 | 4 | — | | — | | — | | 14 | 4 |
| AS Cagnes-Le Cros | 2023–24 | Championnat National 3 | 7 | 4 | 0 | 0 | — | | — | | 7 | 4 |
| FC Bourgoin-Jallieu | 2023–24 | Championnat National 2 | 12 | 3 | — | | — | | — | | 12 | 3 |
| FC Bourgoin-Jallieu | 2024–25 | Championnat National 2 | 15 | 0 | 4 | 2 | — | | — | | 19 | 2 |
| FC Bourgoin-Jallieu | Total | | 27 | 3 | 4 | 2 | — | | — | | 31 | 5 |
| Riviera | 2025–26 | Championnat National 2 | 24 | 6 | 0 | 0 | — | | — | | 24 | 6 |
| Career total | | | 156 | 38 | 8 | 3 | 1 | 0 | 0 | 0 | 165 | 41 |
