= Moussa Koné (Senegalese footballer) =

Senegalese footballer

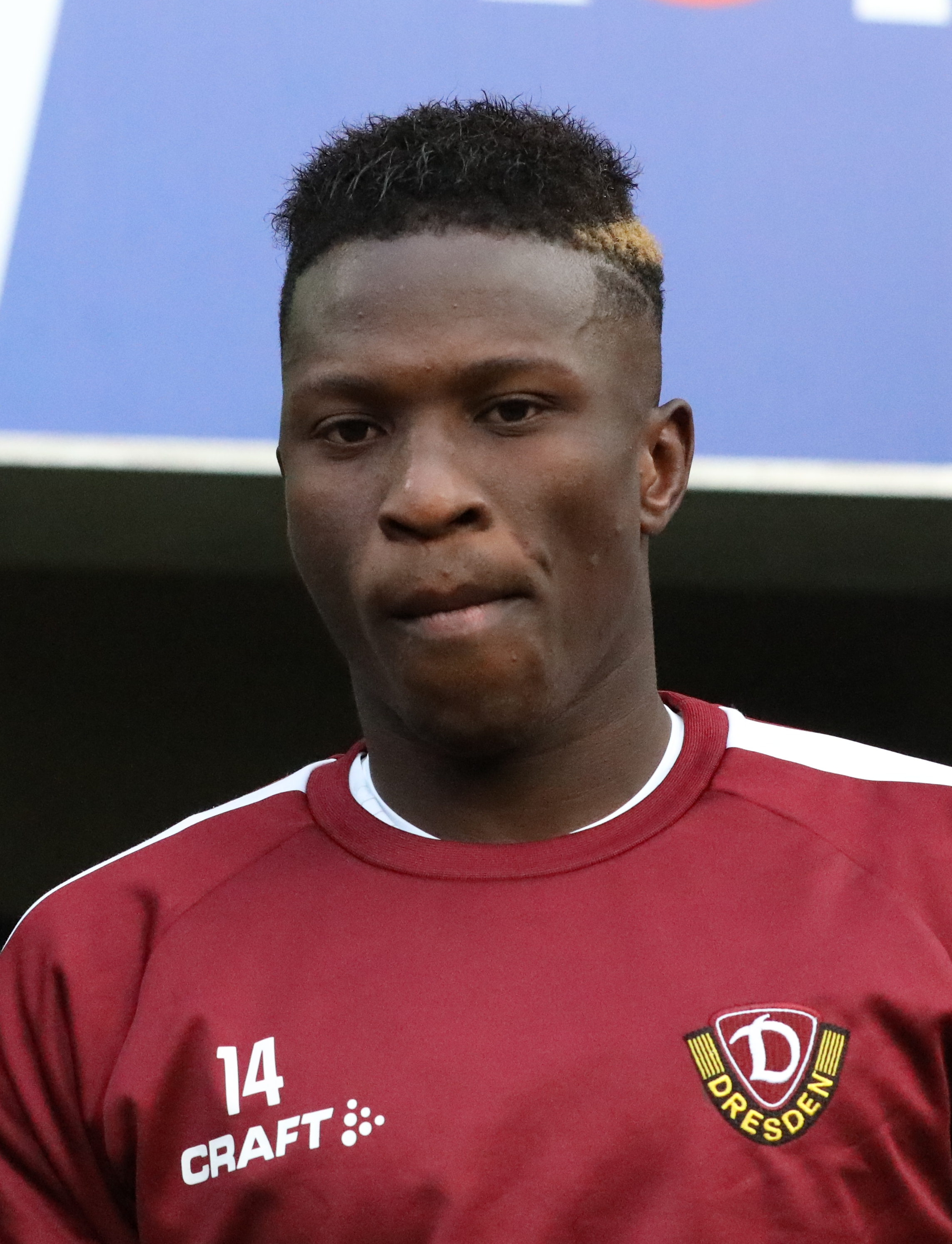
- Koné in 2019

Personal information
- Date of birth: 30 December 1996 (age 29)
- Place of birth: Dakar, Senegal
- Height: 1.74 m (5 ft 9 in)
- Position: Forward

Team information
- Current team: Olympic Safi
- Number: 14

Senior career*
Years	Team	Apps	(Gls)
2014–2016	AS Dakar Sacré-Cœur		
2016–2018	FC Zürich	46	(18)
2018–2020	Dynamo Dresden	59	(22)
2020–2023	Nîmes	80	(26)
2023–2024	LASK	8	(0)
2024	→ DAC Dunajská Streda (loan)	10	(3)
2025	Boavista	7	(0)
2025–	Olympic Safi	28	(12)

International career
2015	Senegal U20	11	(3)
Medal record
Men's football
Representing Senegal
African U-20 Championship
Silver medal – second place	2015 Senegal
- * Club domestic league appearances and goals as of 1 February 2026

Moussa Koné (born 30 December 1996) is a Senegalese professional footballer who plays as a forward for Botola Pro club Olympic Safi.

== Career ==
=== FC Zürich, Dynamo Dresden ===
In January 2018, Koné left Swiss Super League side FC Zürich to join Dynamo Dresden of the 2. Bundesliga. He signed a 4 1/2-year contract until 2022 with the German club.

=== Nîmes ===
On 22 January 2020, Koné signed for Nîmes Olympique in Ligue 1 on a three-year contract for a fee of £2.70 million. He was brought in as Nîmes were struggling for goals and were 19th in Ligue 1 at the time of his signing having only scored 15 goals, the joint lowest in the division.

=== LASK ===
On 15 February 2024, Koné moved on loan to DAC Dunajská Streda in Slovakia.

On 14 August 2024, Koné's contract with LASK was terminated by mutual consent.

=== Olympic Safi ===
On 7 August 2025, he joined Moroccan club Olympic Safi.

== Career statistics ==
As of 1 July 2022

Appearances and goals by club, season and competition
Club	Season	League			Cup		Europa League		Other		Total	
Club	Season	Division	Apps	Goals	Apps	Goals	Apps	Goals	Apps	Goals	Apps	Goals
FC Zürich	2015–16	Super League	4	0	1 (Note: Appearances in the Swiss Cup)	0	–		0	0	5	0
FC Zürich	2016–17	Challenge League	27	16	2	1	5	1	0	0	34	18
FC Zürich	2017–18	Super League	15	2	4	6	–		0	0	19	8
FC Zürich	Total		46	18	7	7	5	1	0	0	57	24
Dynamo Dresden	2017–18	2. Bundesliga	14	7	0	0	–		0	0	14	7
Dynamo Dresden	2018–19	2. Bundesliga	29	9	1 (Note: Appearances in the DFB-Pokal)	0	–		0	0	30	9
Dynamo Dresden	2019–20	2. Bundesliga	16	6	2	1	–		0	0	18	7
Dynamo Dresden	Total		59	22	3	1	0	0	0	0	62	23
Nîmes	2019–20	Ligue 1	5	2	0	0	–		0	0	5	2
Nîmes	2020–21	Ligue 1	33	9	0	0	–		0	0	33	9
Nîmes	2021–22	Ligue 2	28	11	2	1	–		0	0	30	12
Nîmes	Total		66	22	2	1	0	0	0	0	68	23
Career total			171	62	12	9	5	1	0	0	188	72
