= Théo Sainte-Luce =

French footballer (born 1998)

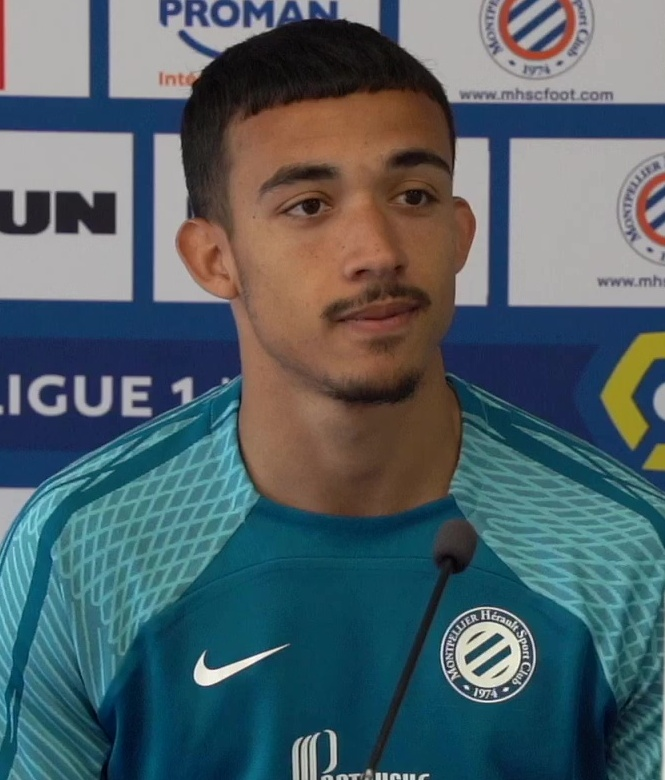
- Sainte-Luce with Montpellier in 2023

Personal information
- Full name: Théo Sainte-Luce
- Date of birth: 20 October 1998 (age 28)
- Place of birth: Chauny, France
- Height: 1.76 m (5 ft 9 in)
- Position: Left-back

Team information
- Current team: Montpellier
- Number: 17

Youth career
- Chauny
- 2015–2019: Nîmes

Senior career*
Years	Team	Apps	(Gls)
2016–2020	Nîmes B	71	(1)
2019–2022	Nîmes	30	(1)
2020	→ Gazélec Ajaccio (loan)	8	(0)
2020–2021	→ Red Star (loan)	19	(0)
2022–	Montpellier	57	(3)
- * Club domestic league appearances and goals as of 11 May 2026

Théo Sainte-Luce (born 20 October 1998) is a French professional footballer who plays as a left-back for Ligue 2 club Montpellier.

== Career ==
A youth product of Chauny, Sainte-Luce joined Nîmes at the age of 17. He made his professional debut for Nîmes in a 3–1 Ligue 1 win over Rennes on 9 April 2019.

On 23 May 2022, Sainte-Luce signed a pre-contract agreement with Nîmes's rivals Montpellier.

== Personal life ==
Born in metropolitan France, Sainte-Luce is of Guadeloupean descent.

== Career statistics ==
As of match played 4 May 2025

Appearances and goals by club, season and competition
Club	Season	League			Cup		League cup		Other		Total	
Club	Season	Division	Apps	Goals	Apps	Goals	Apps	Goals	Apps	Goals	Apps	Goals
Nîmes B	2018–19	CFA 2	29	0	—		—		—		29	0
Nîmes B	2019–20	CFA 2	6	0	—		—		—		6	0
Nîmes B	Total		35	0	—		—		—		35	0
Nîmes	2018–19	Ligue 1	1	0	0	0	—		—		1	0
Nîmes	2019–20	Ligue 1	3	0	0	0	2	0	—		5	0
Nîmes	2021–22	Ligue 1	26	1	2	0	—		—		28	1
Nîmes	Total		30	1	2	0	2	0	—		34	1
Gazélec Ajaccio (loan)	2019–20	CFA	8	0	—		—		—		8	0
Red Star (loan)	2020–21	CFA	19	0	0	0	—		—		19	0
Montpellier	2022–23	Ligue 1	9	1	0	0	—		—		9	1
Montpellier	2023–24	Ligue 1	6	0	2	0	—		—		8	0
Montpellier	2024–25	Ligue 1	16	1	1	0	—		—		17	1
Montpellier	Total		31	2	3	0	—		—		34	2
Career total			123	3	5	0	2	0	0	0	130	3
