= Baptiste Reynet =

French footballer (born 1990)

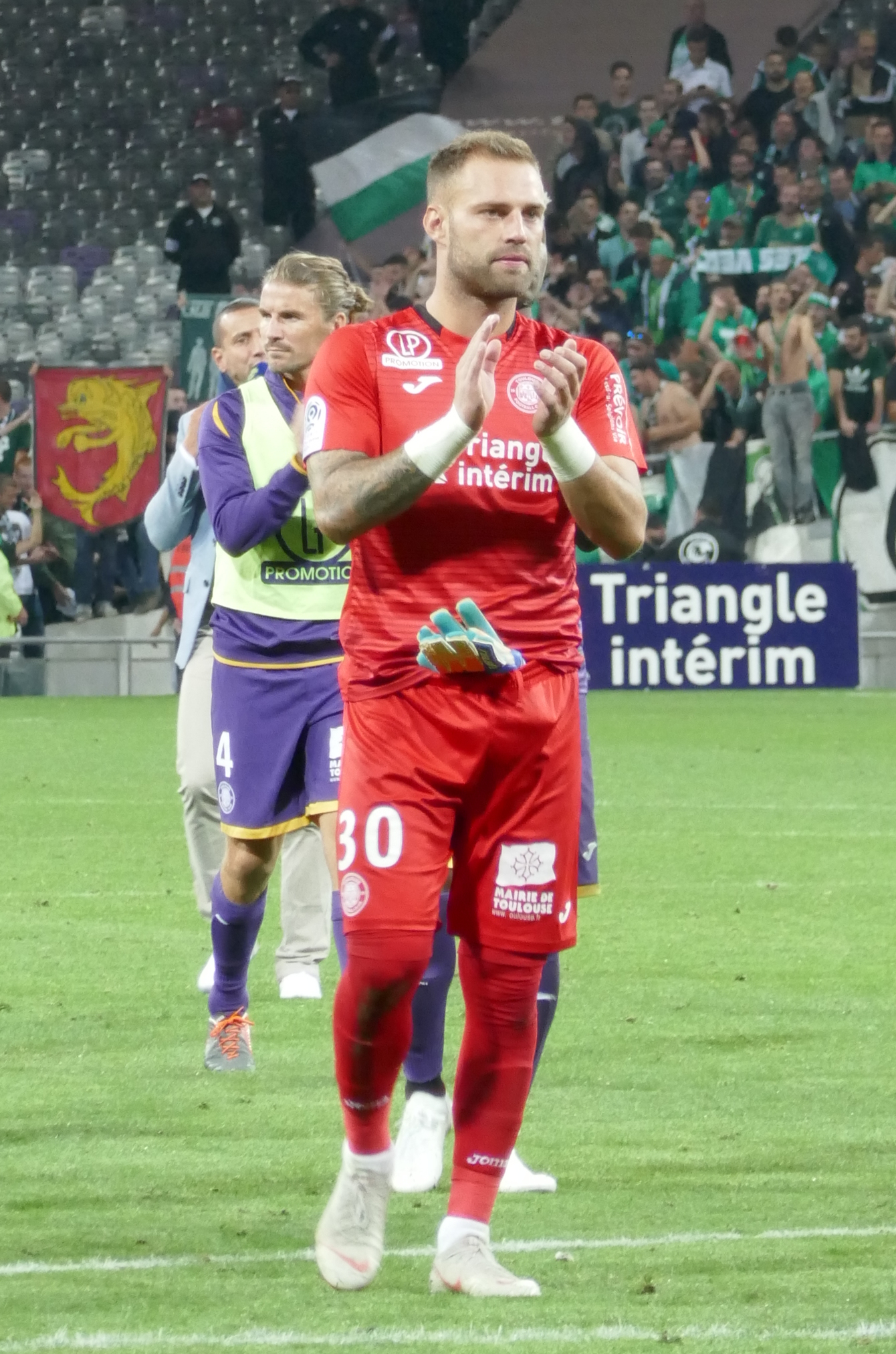
- Reynet with Toulouse in 2018

Personal information
- Full name: Baptiste Charles Nicolas Reynet
- Date of birth: 28 October 1990 (age 36)
- Place of birth: Romans-sur-Isère, France
- Height: 1.85 m (6 ft 1 in)
- Position: Goalkeeper

Youth career
- 1997–2002: Moursoise
- 2002–2005: Arménienne Valence
- 2005–2007: Moursoise
- 2007–2008: Martigues

Senior career*
Years	Team	Apps	(Gls)
2008–2011	Martigues	53	(0)
2011–2013	Dijon	78	(0)
2013–2015	Lorient	6	(0)
2013–2014	Lorient B	5	(0)
2014–2015	→ Dijon (loan)	36	(0)
2015–2018	Dijon	113	(0)
2018–2020	Toulouse	54	(0)
2020–2021	Nîmes	38	(0)
2021–2023	Dijon	71	(0)
2023–2024	Ibiza	9	(0)
Total		465	(0)
- * Club domestic league appearances and goals

Baptiste Charles Nicolas Reynet (born 28 October 1990) is a French former professional footballer who played as a goalkeeper.

== Career ==
Reynet was born in Romans.

He joined Dijon FCO in May 2011 after spending three years with Martigues whom he made over 50 appearances with. He made his club debut with Dijon on 13 August 2011 in a 2–0 league defeat to Toulouse.

Reynet was loaned back to Dijon after one year in FC Lorient.

On 29 June 2018, Reynet joined Ligue 1 club Toulouse on a four-year contract.

On 24 June 2020, Reynet joined fellow Ligue 1 side Nîmes for an undisclosed fee, reportedly around €500,000. He signed a two-year contract and chose to wear the number 30.

On 30 June 2021, following Nîmes relegation from Ligue 1, Reynet returned to Dijon, competing in Ligue 2, signing a three-year contract. On 5 July 2023, following Dijon's relegation to the Championnat National, the club announced that Reynet's contract had been terminated by mutual agreement.

On 27 October 2023, Reynet joined Primera Federación (Spanish third tier) club UD Ibiza, signing a contract until the end of the 2023–24 season.

== Career statistics ==
=== Club ===
Appearances and goals by club, season and competition
Club	Season	League			National cup		League cup		Other		Total	
Club	Season	Division	Apps	Goals	Apps	Goals	Apps	Goals	Apps	Goals	Apps	Goals
Dijon	2011–12	Ligue 1	37	0	1	0	0	0	—		38	0
Dijon	2012–13	Ligue 2	38	0	1	0	2	0	—		41	0
Dijon	2013–14	Ligue 2	3	0	0	0	1	0	—		4	0
Dijon	Total		78	0	2	0	3	0	—		83	0
Lorient	2013–14	Ligue 1	6	0	0	0	1	0	—		7	0
Lorient B	2013–14	CFA 2	5	0	—		—		—		5	0
Dijon (loan)	2014–15	Ligue 2	36	0	1	0	2	0	—		39	0
Dijon	2015–16	Ligue 2	38	0	0	0	2	0	—		40	0
Dijon	2016–17	Ligue 1	37	0	0	0	0	0	—		37	0
Dijon	2017–18	Ligue 1	38	0	0	0	0	0	—		38	0
Dijon	Total		149	0	1	0	4	0	—		154	0
Toulouse	2018–19	Ligue 1	31	0	1	0	0	0	—		32	0
Toulouse	2019–20	Ligue 1	23	0	0	0	0	0	—		23	0
Toulouse	Total		54	0	1	0	0	0	—		55	0
Nîmes	2020–21	Ligue 1	38	0	0	0	—		—		38	0
Dijon	2021–22	Ligue 2	36	0	1	0	—		—		37	0
Dijon	2022–23	Ligue 2	35	0	0	0	—		—		35	0
Dijon	Total		71	0	1	0	—		—		72	0
Ibiza	2023–24	Primera Federación	9	0	1	0	—		2	0	12	0
Career total			412	0	5	0	8	0	2	0	427	0
