= Malagasy nationality law =

Malagasy Nationality Code

Parliament of Madagascar
- Long title: Ordonnance No. 60-064 du 22 juillet 1960 portant Code de la nationalité malgache (modifiée par la Loi No. 1961-052; la Loi No.1962-005; l’ordonnance no.1973-049; la Loi No. 1995–021; et la Loi No. 2016-038.)
- Enacted by: Government of Madagascar
- Status: Current legislation

Malagasy nationality law is regulated by the Constitution of Madagascar, as amended; the Malagasy Nationality Code, and its revisions; and various international agreements to which the country is a signatory. These laws determine who is, or is eligible to be, a national of Madagascar. The legal means to acquire nationality, formal legal membership in a nation, differ from the domestic relationship of rights and obligations between a national and the nation, known as citizenship. Nationality describes the relationship of an individual to the state under international law, whereas citizenship is the domestic relationship of an individual and the nation. Malagasy nationality is typically obtained under the principle of jus soli, i.e. by birth in Madagascar, or jus sanguinis, born to parents with Malagasy nationality. It can be granted to persons with an affiliation to the country, or to a permanent resident who has lived in the country for a given period of time through naturalization.

== Acquisition of nationality ==
Nationality can be acquired in Madagascar at birth or later in life through naturalization.

=== By birth ===
Those who acquire nationality at birth include:

- Children born anywhere to a parent with Malagasy nationality; or
- Abandoned children or orphans discovered in the territory whose parents are unknown and presumed to be Malagasy.

=== By naturalization ===
Naturalization can be granted to persons who have resided in the territory for a sufficient period of time to confirm they understand the Malagasy language and the customs and traditions of the society. General provisions are that applicants have good character and conduct; have no criminal convictions with sentences exceeding one year; have good mental and physical health; and can economically be self-sufficient. Applicants must have resided in the country for five years. Besides foreigners meeting the criteria, other persons who may be naturalized include:

- Adoptees may opt to obtain Malagasy nationality after completion of a legal adoption;
- The wife of a Malagasy husband is automatically granted his nationality if she would become stateless; if otherwise requested, it may be granted at the discretion of authorities without a residency requirement;
- Minor children of a naturalized Malagasy are automatically naturalized simultaneously with the parent; or
- Persons who have provided significant service to the nation without meeting other requirements.

== Loss of nationality ==
Malagasy nationals of origin can renounce their nationality if approved to do so by the state. Nationals of origin may be denaturalized in Madagascar for voluntarily acquiring another nationality, for serving a foreign government, or for participating in an activity like voting, as if one had another nationality. Naturalized persons may lose their nationality for failure to complete military service; by performing actions against state interests; committing serious crimes, disloyal acts, or crimes against the state or state security; or for fraud, misrepresentation, or concealment in a naturalization petition.

== Dual nationality ==
Dual nationality is not allowed in Madagascar for Malagasy of origin, but naturalized persons may retain their prior nationality.

== History ==
=== African kingdoms and European contact (1500–1896) ===
Magaster, or Madeigascar, was first known by Europeans from the travels of Marco Polo in the thirteenth century. The island was inhabited by migratory people who had arrived there around 1000 A.D. from the east coast of Africa, Arabia, and Indonesia and were involved in the trade networks operating in the Indian Ocean and along the African coastline. On 10 August 1500, the Portuguese navigator, Diogo Dias, sighted the island, giving it the name "San Lorenzo". The Portuguese landed in 1506 and throughout the century they and the Dutch took over the Arab-Swahili trade routes. By the seventeenth century, the Dutch and Portuguese were supplanted by British and French traders. The French established a trading base at Fort Dauphin and traded to their west with the Sakalava kingdoms of Menabe and Boina. On the east coast, the Betsimisaraka Confederacy conducted raiding expeditions in the Comoros islands and in the central highlands the Merina Empire predominated, ruling by the eighteenth century over two-thirds of the territory in the country.

By the end of the eighteenth century, Madagascar and its dependencies had grown wealthy from the slave trade. Conflicts between France and Britain over the Mascarene Islands escalated during the Napoleonic Wars (1803–1815), and in 1810, the British began an occupation of the Mascarenes. Attempting to enforce the British ban on its subjects for engaging in the slave trade, in 1817, Britain offered to the Merina ruler Radama I an annual cash compensation, as well as technological assistance to develop alternative trade. France continued to be influential on the east and west coasts, while Britain focused on the Merina Empire and the center of the country. Native rulers attempted to balance the influences of the Europeans to prevent being subordinated to outside powers. When that policy failed, in 1835, Queen Ranavalona I, expelled all Europeans and the ban lasted until her death in 1861.

In 1861, Marie Jules Dupré negotiated an agreement with Ranavolona's successor, Radama II to reopen the territory to the French. One treaty was ratified by the French government and reinstated the Lambert Charter, which had granted special privileges to development in Madagascar to Joseph-François Lambert and Dupré. A secret treaty, which remained unacknowledged by France, recognized French sovereignty in territories ruled by the Sakalava people. When Radama II was murdered in 1863, his successor revoked the treaties. Unable to reassert their influence, in 1883, France militarily began a campaign known as the Franco-Hova Wars. In 1890, Britain and France agreed to recognition of each other's claims to control of Zanzibar by the British and Madagascar by the French. Antananarivo, the capital of the Merina Empire, was taken by the French in 1895, and the ruler agreed to the establishment of a French protectorate over Madagascar.

=== French colony (1896–1960) ===
On 6 August 1896, Madagascar and its dependent islands were declared to be a French colony. In 1848, slavery was abolished throughout the French Empire and the Civil Code was extended to all of the French citizens in the colonies. Under the Civil Code, women were legally incapacitated and paternal authority was established over their children. Upon marriage, a woman married to a French man automatically acquired the same nationality as her spouse. Illegitimate children were barred from inheritance and nationality could only be transmitted through a father. Non-citizen nationals were governed by traditional laws concerning marriage and inheritance which placed the well-being of the community above individual rights. These laws prevented a wife from being treated as a slave, required her husband to support her, and entitled her kin to a bride price, to compensate them for the loss of her fertility to their kinship group and secure the legality of the union. Having paid the price for the marriage contract, she and her offspring belonged to the kinship network of her husband and could be inherited if her husband died. The French Nationality Law of 1889 codified previous statutory laws, changing the French standard from jus sanguinis to jus soli and was extended to the French West Indies. Under its terms, women who would become stateless by the rule to acquire their spouse's nationality were allowed to retain their French nationality upon marriage. The Nationality Law was modified in 1897 when it was extended to the remainder of the French colonies. Clarification in the 1897 decree included that bestowing nationality by birth in French territory only applied to children born in France, restoring descent requirements for the colonies.

Under the Code de l'indigénat (Code of Indigenous Status) promulgated for Algeria in 1881 and extended to Madagascar and the Comoros Protectorate in 1901, nationals in the new colonies followed customary law. In 1908, the Comoros was made a dependent territory of Madagascar, becoming a separate colony in 1914, but it continued to be administrated from Madagascar. In 1909, a decree was issued declaring that persons born in Madagascar prior to or after the annexation by France were French subjects with native status and governed under Malagasy customary law. Natives who had reached the age of majority and wanted to attain full French status for their entire families could naturalize by agreeing to abide by French law and demonstrating fluency in French. According to a decree issued in 1913, the status of French subject of children born in Madagascar could not be lost by virtue of obtaining another nationality, as long as permission was granted from France. The purpose of the decree was to allow an illegitimate child born of a Malagasy mother and foreign father to retain French status, even if the father's status was automatically bestowed by his nation. Children born to French subjects and native Malagasy women were accorded full French nationality with the rights of citizenship per a 1916 decree.

Following the end of World War I, France passed a law, "Décret N°. 24 on 25 March 1915, that allowed subjects or protected persons who were non-citizen nationals and had established domicile in a French territory to acquire full citizenship, including the naturalization of their wives and minor children, by having received the cross of the Legion of Honor, having obtained a university degree, having rendered service to the nation, having attained the rank of an officer or received a medal from the French army, who had married a Frenchwoman and established a one-year residency; or who had resided for more than ten years in a colony other than their country of origin.In 1925, the Comoros was granted local administration, though it was still officially a province of Madagascar. In 1927, France passed a new Nationality Law, which under Article 8, removed the requirement for married women to automatically derive the nationality of a husband and provided that her nationality could only be changed if she consented to change her nationality. It also allowed children born in France to native-born French women married to foreigners to acquire their nationality from their mothers. When it was implemented it included Guadeloupe, Martinique and Réunion but was extended to the remaining French possessions for French citizens only in 1928. Under Article 26 of the 1928 decree was the stipulation that it did not apply to natives of the French possessions except Algeria, Guadeloupe, Martinique, and Réunion. A decade later, the legal incapacity of married women was finally invalidated for French citizens.

At the end of World War II, a statute issued on 7 March 1944 granted French citizenship to those who had performed services to the nation, such as serving as civil servants or receiving recognitions. The Constitution of 1946 granted French citizenship to all subjects of France's territories without having to renounce their personal status as natives. Under its terms, Madagascar and the Comoros were separated officially and classified as Overseas Territories within the French Union. In 1945, a new Code of French Nationality was passed, which conferred once again automatic French nationality on foreign wives of French men, but allowed mothers who were French nationals to pass their nationality to children born outside of France. It expressly applied to Algeria, French Guiana, Guadeloupe, Martinique and Réunion and was extended to the Overseas Territories in 1953, but in the case of the latter had distinctions for the rights of those who were naturalized. With the passage of the 1958 French Constitution, nationality provisions were standardized for France, Overseas Departments, and Overseas Territories. Article 86 excluded the possibility for independence of the colonies. The French Constitution was amended on 1960 to allow states to maintain membership in the Community even if they were independent republics.

=== Post-independence (1960–present) ===
On 26 June 1960, Madagascar gained its independence from France and granted nationality at independence to persons who had French nationality. Despite the large Karana population, Indian and Pakistani migrants to Madagascar, only those who had been naturalized as French could obtain nationality; thus, many remained stateless. Under the terms of the nationality statute (Ordinance No. 60-064) on 22 July 1960, after independence children could obtain nationality from a Malagasy father if the child was born legitimately or if the child was illegitimate and the mother had unknown nationality; from a Malagasy mother if the child was illegitimate; or from birth in the country if both parents were unknown and likely to have been Malagasy. It also allowed legitimate children of Malagasy mothers and foreign fathers or illegitimate children of Malagasy fathers and foreign mothers to naturalize prior to reaching their majority. Foreign wives automatically obtained Malagasy nationality upon marriage. Naturalization was discretionary and based upon good character and health as well as assimilation into the prevailing national culture.

On 15 December 2016, an amendment (Loi No. 2016–038) was passed eliminating the gender discrepancies barring derivative nationality from mothers. From January 2017, under the amended code women could transmit their nationality to their children. The law did not remove inequalities for women and men to pass on nationality to a spouse, leaving in place rules which do not allow a Malagasy woman's husband preferential provisions to acquire nationality. The amendment also did not rectify the generational statelessness of the 400,000 Karana, estimated 70,000 to 120,000 Comorians, approximately 15,000 Chinese, and around 5,000 people of Arab descent who have resided in the territory since independence. Since 1960, only 1,600 persons have successfully been allowed to naturalize in Madagascar.
