= Sidy Sarr =

Senegalese footballer

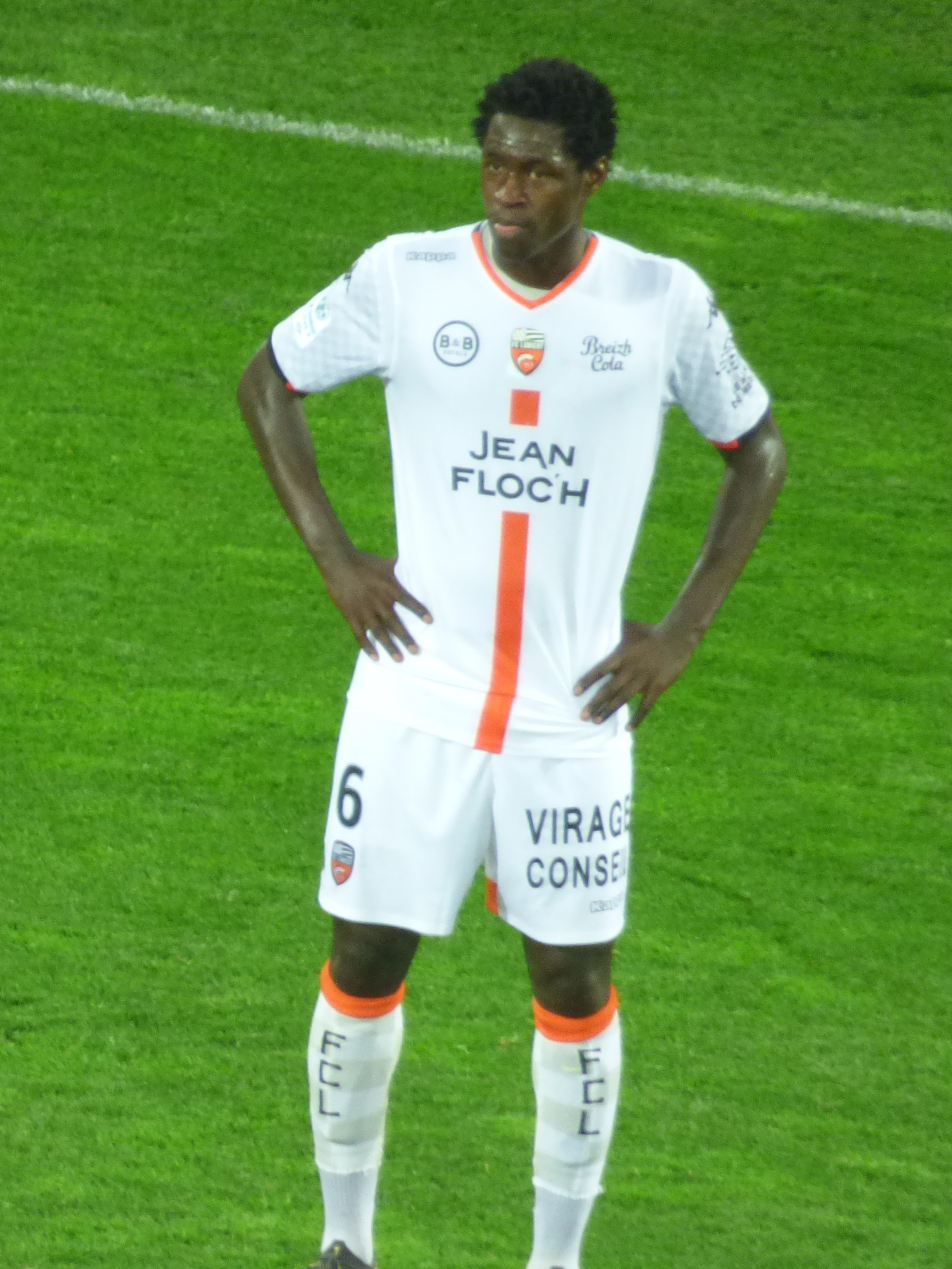
- Sarr with Lorient in 2019

Personal information
- Date of birth: 5 June 1996 (age 30)
- Place of birth: Dakar, Senegal
- Height: 1.96 m (6 ft 5 in)
- Position: Defensive midfielder

Team information
- Current team: AS Soliman

Senior career*
Years	Team	Apps	(Gls)
2015–2018	KV Kortrijk	35	(2)
2017–2018	→ Châteauroux (loan)	31	(11)
2018–2019	Châteauroux	6	(0)
2018–2019	→ Lorient (loan)	19	(0)
2019–2022	Nîmes	44	(1)
2020	Nîmes B	1	(0)
2022–2023	Chaves	5	(0)
2023–2024	SAS Épinal	1	(1)
2024–	AS Soliman	19	(2)

International career^{‡}
2015	Senegal U20	12	(4)
2015	Senegal U23	4	(1)
2018–2020	Senegal	6	(2)
Medal record
Men's football
Representing Senegal
African U-20 Championship
Runner-up	2015 Senegal
- * Club domestic league appearances and goals as of 22 July 2025 @ 15:34(AEST) ‡ National team caps and goals as of 22:03, 9 January 2023 (UTC)

Sidy Sarr (born 5 June 1996) is a Senegalese professional footballer who plays as a defensive midfielder for Tunisian Ligue Professionnelle 1 club AS Soliman. He has played for the Senegal national team.

== Club career ==
In September 2018, Sarr joined Lorient on loan from Châteauroux for the 2018–19 season.

In March 2024, Sarr joined Championnat National club SAS Épinal.

== Personal life ==
Sarr was taken into police custody in October 2021 on allegations that he had relations with underage prostitutes. His lawyer denied the accusations, and claimed that Sarr had been a "victim of a manipulation".

== Career statistics ==
=== Club ===
As of match played on 1 July 2021

Appearances and goals by club, season and competition
Club	Season	League			National cup		League cup		Other		Total	
Club	Season	Division	Apps	Goals	Apps	Goals	Apps	Goals	Apps	Goals	Apps	Goals
Kortrijk	2015–16	Belgian Pro League	10	2	1	0	—				11	2
Kortrijk	2016–17	Belgian First Division A	25	0	1	0	—		5	1	31	1
Kortrijk	Total		35	2	2	0	0	0	5	1	42	3
Châteauroux (loan)	2017–18	Ligue 2	31	11	3	0	1	0	—		35	11
Châteauroux	2018–19	Ligue 2	4	0	0	0	1	0	—		5	0
Châteauroux	2019–20	Ligue 2	2	0	0	0	0	0	—		2	0
Châteauroux	Total		6	0	0	0	1	0	0	0	7	0
Lorient	2018–19	Ligue 2	19	0	0	0	1	0	—		20	0
Nîmes	2019–20	Ligue 1	22	0	2	0	1	0	—		25	0
Nîmes	2020–21	Ligue 1	9	0	0	0	—		—		9	0
Nîmes	Total		31	0	2	0	1	0	0	0	34	0
Nîmes B	2019–20	Championnat National 2	1	0	–		–		—		1	0
Career total			123	13	7	0	4	0	5	1	139	14

=== International goals ===
Scores and results list Senegal's goal tally first, score column indicates score after each Sarr goal.

List of international goals scored by Sidy Sarr
No.	Date	Venue	Opponent	Score	Result	Competition
1	16 October 2018	Khartoum Stadium, Khartoum, Sudan	Sudan	1–0	1–0	2019 Africa Cup of Nations qualification
2	13 November 2019	Stade Lat-Dior, Thiès, Senegal	Congo	1–0	2–0	2021 Africa Cup of Nations qualification
