= Léon Delpech =

French footballer (born 2002)

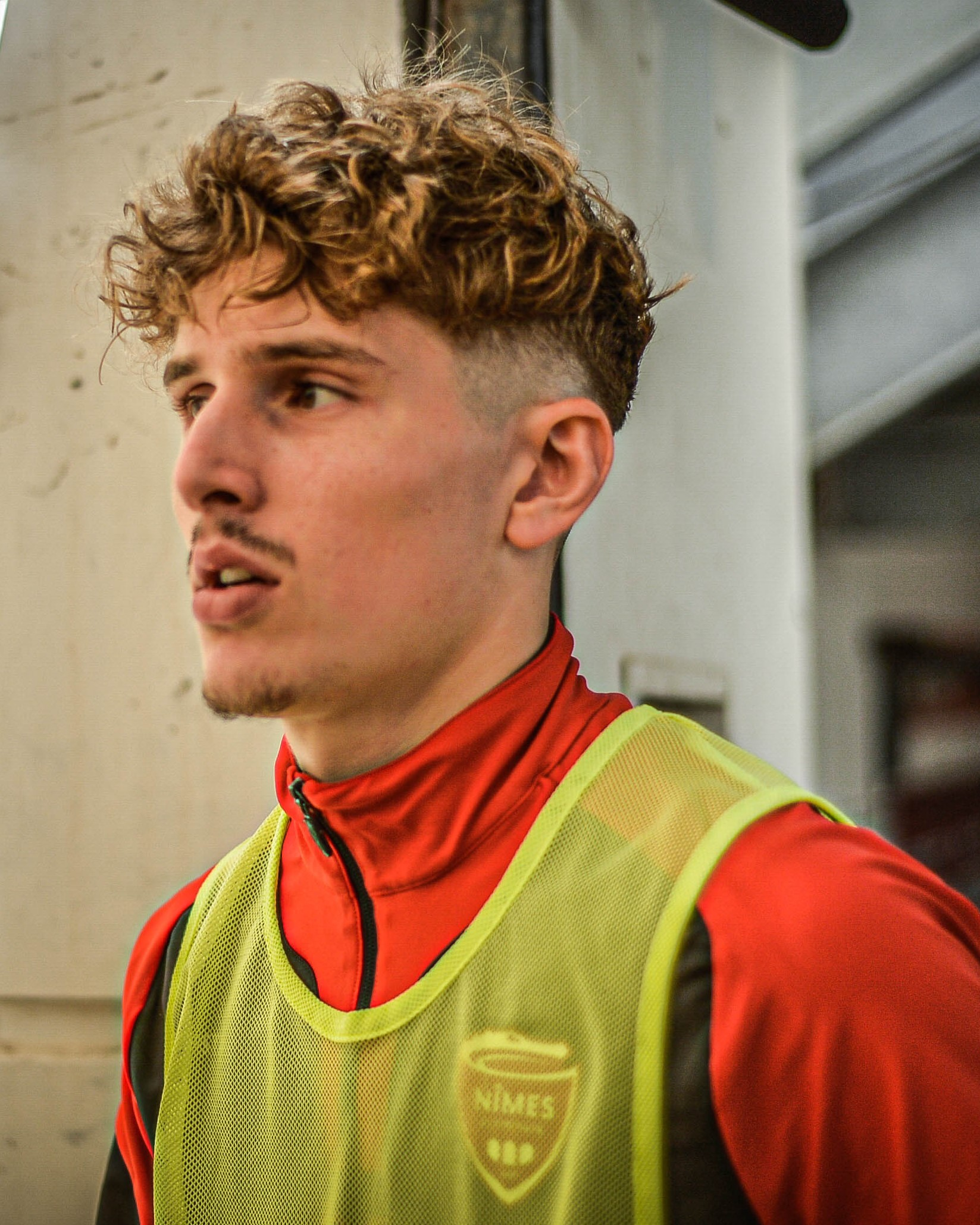
- Delpech in 2022.

Personal information
- Date of birth: 13 August 2002 (age 24)
- Place of birth: Bordeaux, France
- Height: 1.78 m (5 ft 10 in)
- Position: Midfielder

Team information
- Current team: Chambly
- Number: 13

Youth career
- –2019: Mérignac-Arlac
- 2019–2021: Nîmes

Senior career*
Years	Team	Apps	(Gls)
2019–2022	Nîmes B	7	(1)
2021–2025	Nîmes	61	(3)
2026–	Chambly	2	(0)
- * Club domestic league appearances and goals as of 7 February 2026

Léon Delpech (born 13 August 2002) is a French professional footballer who plays as a midfielder for Championnat National 1 club Chambly.

== Club career ==
On 24 July 2021, Delpech made his professional debut for Nîmes in a 1–1 Ligue 2 draw against Bastia.
