= Mahamadou Doucouré =

Footballer (born 2000)

Personal information
- Full name: Mahamadou Doucouré
- Date of birth: 22 May 2000 (age 26)
- Place of birth: Montreuil, France
- Height: 1.81 m (5 ft 11 in)
- Position: Forward

Team information
- Current team: Burgan SC

Youth career
- –2019: Strasbourg

Senior career*
Years	Team	Apps	(Gls)
2018–2020	Strasbourg B	2	(0)
2020–2022	Nîmes B	6	(0)
2021–2024	Nîmes	38	(2)
2024–2025	Villefranche	11	(0)
2025–2026	Biel-Bienne	15	(1)
2026–	Burgan SC	0	(0)

International career
2021	Mali	1	(0)
- * Club domestic league appearances and goals as of 1 January 2026

Mahamadou Doucouré (born 22 May 2000) is a professional footballer who plays as a forward for Kuwaiti club Burgan SC. Born in France, he played for the Mali national team.

== Club career ==
In February 2026, Doucouré signed for Kuwaiti club Burgan SC.

== International career ==
Born in France, Doucouré is Malian by descent. He made his debut for the Mali national team in a 1–0 FIFA World Cup qualification win over Rwanda on 1 September 2021.
