= Sofiane Alakouch =

Footballer (born 1998)

Personal information
- Date of birth: 29 July 1998 (age 28)
- Place of birth: Nîmes, France
- Height: 1.75 m (5 ft 9 in)
- Position: Right-back

Youth career
- 2005–2006: Chemin Bas d'Avignon
- 2006–2016: Nîmes

Senior career*
Years	Team	Apps	(Gls)
2016	Nîmes B	10	(0)
2016–2021	Nîmes	115	(1)
2021	Metz B	1	(0)
2021–2024	Metz	9	(0)
2022	→ Lausanne-Sport (loan)	11	(0)
2023–2024	→ Paris FC (loan)	13	(1)
2024–2026	Paris FC	0	(0)

International career^{‡}
2017	France U19	2	(0)
2018	France U21	1	(0)
2021–	Morocco	4	(0)
- * Club domestic league appearances and goals as of 17 May 2026 ‡ National team caps and goals as of 23:55, 10 December 2022 (UTC)

Sofiane Alakouch (Arabic: سفيان علكوش; born 29 July 1998) is a professional footballer who plays as a right-back. Born in France, he plays for the Morocco national team.

== Club career ==
On 21 July 2021, Alakouch joined Metz for a four-year term. On 15 February 2022, he joined Lausanne-Sport in Switzerland on loan until the end of the season.

== International career ==
Alakouch is Moroccan by descent and represented France at U19 level. He received a call-up to represent the Morocco national team in August 2017. He later received a call-up to represent the France under-20 national team for the 2018 Toulon Tournament on 17 May 2018.

Alakouch debuted with Morocco in a 3–0 2022 FIFA World Cup qualification win over Sudan on 12 November 2021.
