= Gaëtan Paquiez =

French footballer (born 1994)

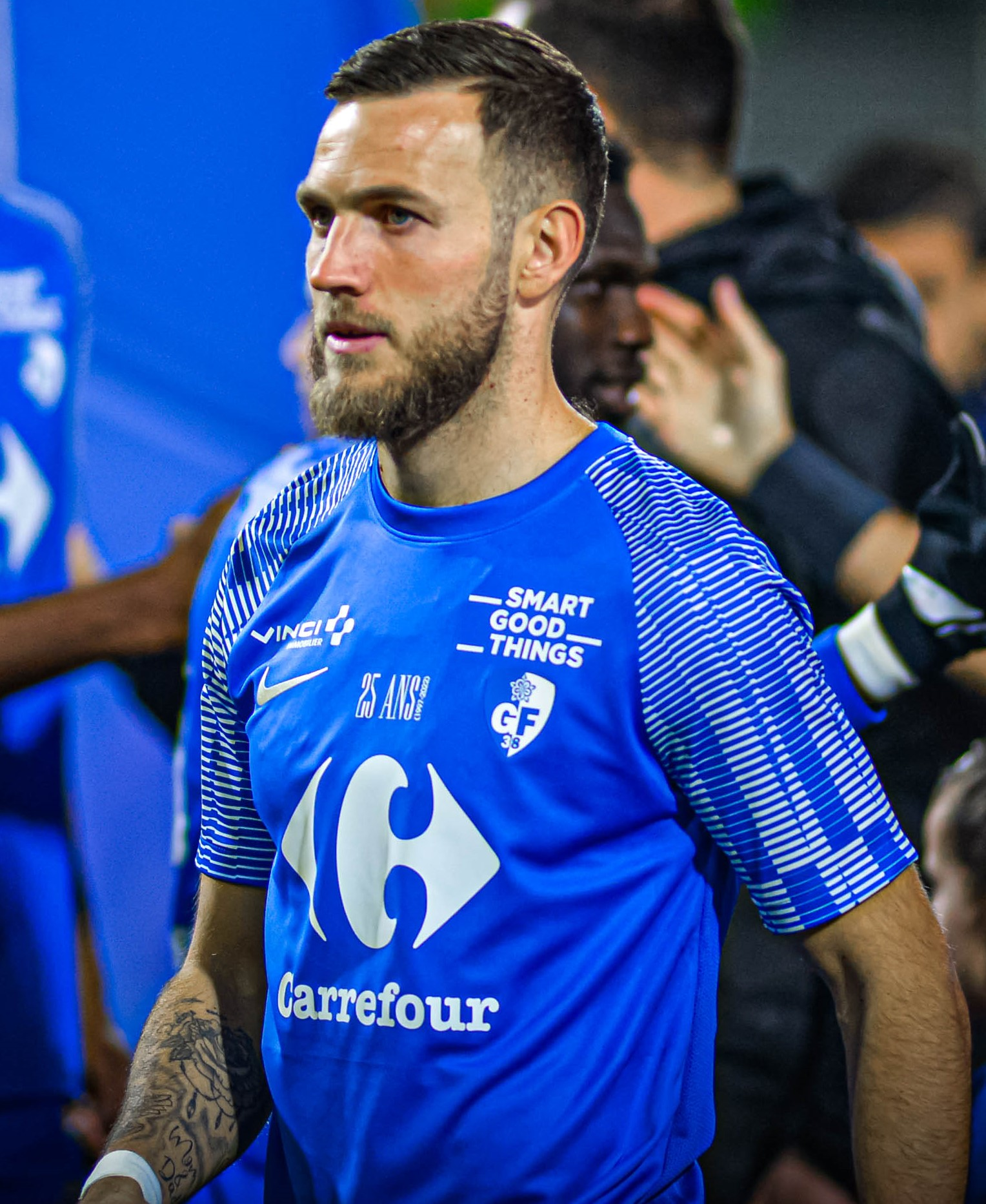
- Paquiez in 2023

Personal information
- Date of birth: 15 February 1994 (age 32)
- Place of birth: Valréas, France
- Height: 1.82 m (6 ft 0 in)
- Position: Midfielder

Team information
- Current team: Pau
- Number: 29

Senior career*
Years	Team	Apps	(Gls)
2014–2018	Nîmes B	64	(2)
2014–2022	Nîmes	150	(0)
2022–2026	Grenoble	111	(2)
2026–	Pau	0	(0)
- * Club domestic league appearances and goals as of 12 May 2026

Gaëtan Paquiez (born 15 February 1994) is a French professional footballer who plays as a midfielder for Ligue 2 club Pau.
