= Antoine Valério =

French footballer (born 1999)

Personal information
- Date of birth: 11 December 1999 (age 26)
- Place of birth: Bordeaux, France
- Height: 1.85 m (6 ft 1 in)
- Position: Midfielder

Team information
- Current team: Virton
- Number: 21

Youth career
- 2004–2007: Béglais
- 2012–2017: Béglais
- 2017–2018: Stade Bordelais

Senior career*
Years	Team	Apps	(Gls)
2018–2019	Stade Bordelais	32	(2)
2019–2022	Nîmes II	11	(1)
2019–2022	Nîmes	29	(0)
2022–2024	Rodez	41	(1)
2024–2025	Villefranche	24	(2)
2025–2026	Chambly	29	(3)
2026–	Virton	4	(0)
- * Club domestic league appearances and goals as of 20 September 2026

Antoine Valério (born 11 December 1999) is a French professional footballer who plays as a midfielder for Challenger Pro League club Virton in Belgium.

== Career ==
A youth product of Béglais, Valério lived in the United States for five years in his youth before returning to Béglais to finish his development and moved to Stade Bordelais in 2017. He made his professional debut with Nîmes in a 1–1 Ligue 1 tie with Amiens SC on 19 October 2019. On 28 October 2019, signed his first professional contract with Nîmes, agreeing to a three-year deal.

On 2 June 2022, Valério signed a three-year contract with Rodez.
