= Stade des Costières =

Former football stadium in Nîmes, France

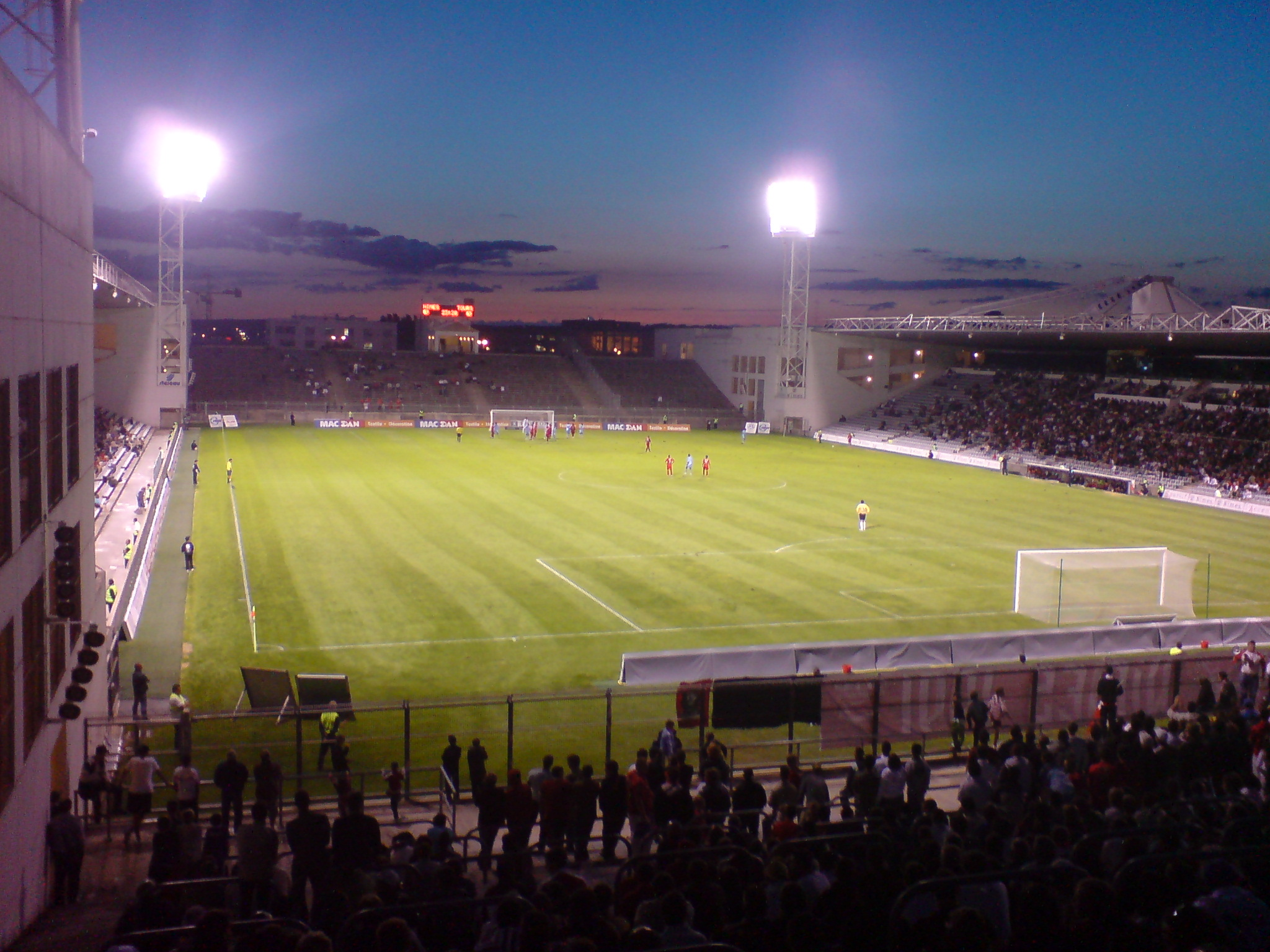
- Interactive map of Stade des Costières
- Location: Nîmes, France
- Coordinates: 43°48′57.5″N 4°21′33.4″E
- Owner: Rani Assaf
- Capacity: 18,364
- Surface: Grass
- Field size: 105 x 68m

Construction
- Groundbreaking: 1 September 1987
- Opened: 15 May 1989
- Closed: 5 November 2022
- Cost: 160 million FRF
- Architect: Vittorio Gregotti

Tenant
- Nîmes Olympique (1989–2022)

The Stade des Costières is an abandoned football stadium in Nîmes, France. Having a capacity of 18,364 people, it was the home of Nîmes Olympique from 1989 to 2022.

== Closure ==
On June 25, 2019, the stadium was sold by the city of Nîmes to club president Rani Assaf for €8 million. It was planned that the stadium would be demolished and rebuilt, with the new ground accommodating 15,100 spectators in comparison to the current 18,482.

On 5 November 2022, Nîmes Olympique played its final match at the Stade des Costières, a 1–0 Ligue 2 victory over Bordeaux. The club would move into the Stade des Antonins on a temporary basis, before the demolition of the Stade des Costières would pave the way for the construction of the Stade Nemausus.

In November 2024, images of the Stade des Costières circulated in the media, highlighting the ground's overgrown grass and vegetation. The premises were left abandoned due to an ongoing conflict between Assaf and the city of Nîmes.
