= Kelyan Guessoum =

French footballer (born 1999)

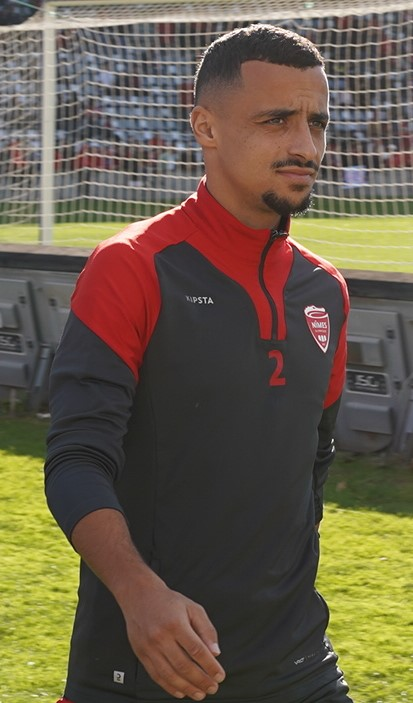
- Guessoum in 2022.

Personal information
- Date of birth: 5 February 1999 (age 27)
- Place of birth: Alès, France
- Height: 1.76 m (5 ft 9 in)
- Position: Defender

Team information
- Current team: MO Béjaïa
- Number: 5

Youth career
- 2010–2014: Olympique Alès
- 2014–2019: Nîmes

Senior career*
| Years | Team | Apps | (Gls) |
| 2016–2022 | Nîmes II | 85 | (5) |
| 2019–2024 | Nîmes | 89 | (1) |
| 2024 | Etar Veliko Tarnovo | 6 | (0) |
| 2024–2026 | MC Oran | 21 | (0) |
| 2026– | MO Béjaïa | 0 | (0) |
- * Club domestic league appearances and goals as of 21 July 2026

Kelyan Guessoum (born 5 February 1999) is a French professional footballer who plays as defender for MO Béjaïa.

== Career ==
On 29 May 2019, Guessoum signed his first professional contract with Nîmes. He made his professional debut with Nîmes in a 3–0 Coupe de la Ligue win over Lens on 29 October 2019.

On 12 February 2024, Guessoum joined Etar Veliko Tarnovo in Bulgaria on a one-and-a-half-year deal.

On 9 July 2024, he joined MC Oran.

On 31 August 2026, he joined MO Béjaïa.

== Personal life ==
Born in France, Guessoum holds French and Algerian nationalities.
