= Mattéo Ahlinvi =

Beninese footballer (born 1999)

Personal information
- Full name: Mattéo Alrich Mawule Ahlinvi
- Date of birth: 2 July 1999 (age 27)
- Place of birth: Arcachon, France
- Height: 1.83 m (6 ft 0 in)
- Position: Midfielder

Team information
- Current team: Farul Constanța
- Number: 70

Youth career
- 2005–2007: Teichoise
- 2007–2009: Ducos
- 2009–2010: New Club
- 2010–2013: New Star Ducos
- 2013–2014: Éclair Rivière Salée
- 2014–2015: New Star Ducos
- 2015–2017: Guingamp

Senior career*
| Years | Team | Apps | (Gls) |
| 2017–2019 | Guingamp B | 21 | (3) |
| 2019–2020 | Nîmes B | 18 | (0) |
| 2019–2021 | Nîmes | 20 | (2) |
| 2021–2023 | Dijon | 44 | (2) |
| 2021–2023 | Dijon B | 11 | (0) |
| 2023–2024 | Čukarički | 3 | (0) |
| 2024 | Västerås SK | 26 | (3) |
| 2025–2026 | Arsenal Tula | 34 | (3) |
| 2026– | Farul Constanța | 15 | (7) |

International career^{‡}
| 2017 | France U19 | 1 | (0) |
| 2020– | Benin | 31 | (0) |
- * Club domestic league appearances and goals as of 7 November 2026 ‡ National team caps and goals as of 18 November 2026

Mattéo Alrich Mawule Ahlinvi (born 2 July 1999) is a professional footballer who plays as midfielder in Liga I for Farul Constanța. Born in France, he plays for the Benin national team.

== Career ==
In April 2019, Ahlinvi signed with Nîmes Olympique. He made his first team debut with Nîmes in a 3–0 Coupe de la Ligue win over RC Lens on 29 October 2019. He signed his first professional contract with the club in June 2020.

On 14 June 2021, he signed a three-year contract with Dijon.

== International career ==
Ahlinvi was born in France to a Beninese father and French mother. He was a youth international for France. He debuted for the Benin national team in a friendly 2–0 win over Gabon on 12 October 2020.

== Personal life ==
Ahlinvi's brother Joris Ahlinvi is also a footballer, who was called up to represent the Benin national football team.

== Career statistsics ==
=== Club ===
As of 7 November 2026

Appearances and goals by club, season and competition
| Club | Season | League | | | National cup (Note: Includes Coupe de France, Russian Cup) | | Europe | | Other | | Total | |
| Club | Season | Division!Apps | Goals | Apps | Goals | Apps | Goals | Apps | Goals | Apps | Goals | Apps |
|---|---|---|---|---|---|---|---|---|---|---|---|---|
| Guingamp B | 2016–17 | CFA 2 | 4 | 1 | — | | — | | — | | 4 | 1 |
| Guingamp B | 2017–18 | Championnat National 3 | 12 | 2 | — | | — | | — | | 12 | 2 |
| Guingamp B | 2018–19 | Championnat National 3 | 5 | 0 | — | | — | | — | | 5 | 0 |
| Guingamp B | Total | | 21 | 3 | — | | — | | — | | 21 | 3 |
| Nimes B | 2019–20 | Championnat National 2 | 17 | 0 | — | | — | | — | | 17 | 0 |
| Nimes B | 2020–21 | Championnat National 3 | 1 | 0 | — | | — | | — | | 1 | 0 |
| Nimes B | Total | | 18 | 0 | — | | — | | — | | 18 | 0 |
| Nimes | 2019–20 | Ligue 1 | 0 | 0 | 1 | 0 | — | | 1 (Note: Appearance in Coupe de la Ligue) | 0 | 2 | 0 |
| Nimes | 2020–21 | Ligue 1 | 20 | 2 | 1 | 0 | — | | — | | 21 | 2 |
| Nimes | Total | | 20 | 2 | 2 | 0 | — | | 1 | 0 | 23 | 2 |
| Dijon | 2021–22 | Ligue 2 | 23 | 0 | 2 | 0 | — | | — | | 25 | 0 |
| Dijon | 2022–23 | Ligue 2 | 21 | 2 | 0 | 0 | — | | — | | 21 | 2 |
| Dijon | Total | | 44 | 2 | 2 | 0 | — | | — | | 46 | 2 |
| Dijon B | 2021–22 | Championnat National 3 | 7 | 1 | — | | — | | — | | 7 | 1 |
| Dijon B | 2022–23 | Championnat National 3 | 4 | 2 | — | | — | | — | | 4 | 2 |
| Dijon B | Total | | 11 | 3 | — | | — | | — | | 11 | 3 |
| Čukarički | 2023–24 | Serbian SuperLiga | 3 | 0 | 2 | 0 | 1 (Note: Appearances in UEFA Europa League) | 0 | — | | 6 | 0 |
| Västerås SK | 2024 | Allsvenskan | 26 | 3 | 4 | 1 | — | | — | | 30 | 4 |
| Arsenal Tula | 2024–25 | Russian First League | 8 | 1 | — | | — | | — | | 8 | 1 |
| Arsenal Tula | 2025–26 | Russian First League | 26 | 2 | 4 | 0 | — | | — | | 30 | 2 |
| Arsenal Tula | Total | | 34 | 3 | 4 | 0 | — | | — | | 38 | 3 |
| Farul Constanța | 2026–27 | Liga I | 15 | 7 | 0 | 0 | — | | — | | 15 | 7 |
| Career Total | | | 192 | 23 | 14 | 1 | 1 | 0 | 1 | 0 | 208 | 24 |

=== International ===
As of match played 18 November 2026

Appearances and goals by national team and year
| National team | Year | Apps | Goals |
|---|---|---|---|
| Benin | 2020 | 2 | 0 |
| Benin | 2021 | 5 | 0 |
| Benin | 2022 | 6 | 0 |
| Benin | 2023 | 6 | 0 |
| Benin | 2024 | 6 | 0 |
| Benin | 2025 | 0 | 0 |
| Benin | 2026 | 6 | 0 |
| Total | | 31 | 0 |

== Honours ==
Guingamp B

- Championnat National 3: 2018–19
