= Lucas Dias (footballer, born 1999) =

French footballer (born 1999)

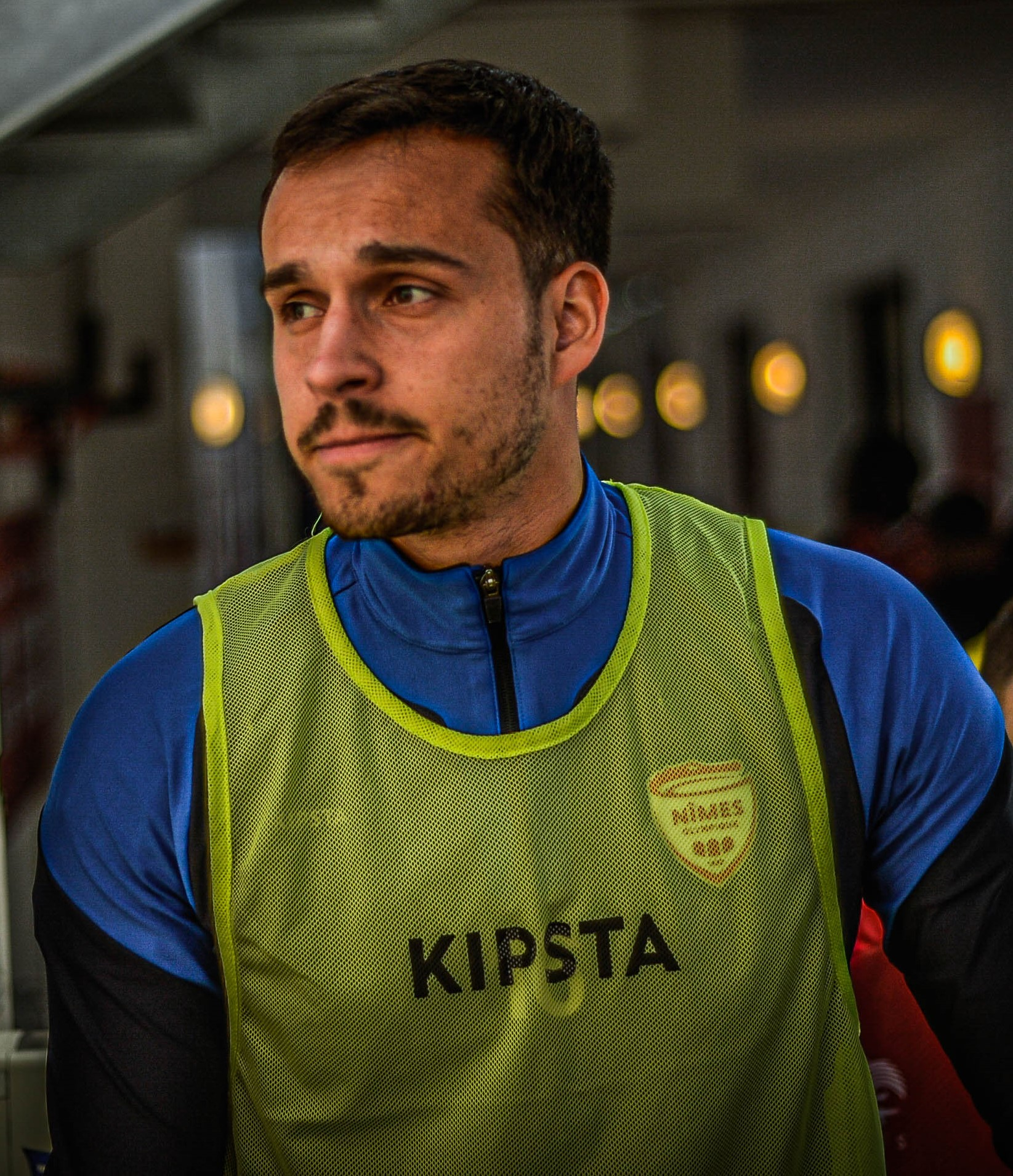
- Dias in 2022.

Personal information
- Full name: Lucas Lionel Dias
- Date of birth: 22 May 1999 (age 27)
- Place of birth: Lyon, France
- Height: 1.83 m (6 ft 0 in)
- Position: Goalkeeper

Team information
- Current team: Nîmes
- Number: 16

Youth career
- 2013–2016: Nîmes

Senior career*
Years	Team	Apps	(Gls)
2016–	Nîmes II	33	(0)
2016–	Nîmes	27	(0)
- * Club domestic league appearances and goals as of 1 January 2025

Lucas Lionel Dias (born 22 May 1999) is a French professional footballer who plays as goalkeeper for Championnat National 1 club Nîmes.

== Career ==
Dias made his professional debut for Nîmes at the age of 17 in a 2–0 loss to AJ Auxerre on 29 November 2016. On 18 June 2019, Dias signed his first professional contract with Nîmes.

== Personal life ==
Born in France, Dias is of Portuguese descent through his paternal grandfather from Porto.
