= 2021–22 FC Sochaux-Montbéliard season =

Sochaux
2021–22 season
- Owner: Nenking
- Chairman: Frankie Yau
- Head coach: Omar Daf
- Stadium: Stade Auguste Bonal
- Ligue 2: 5th
- Coupe de France: Round of 64
- Top goalscorer: League: Aldo Kalulu (8); All: Aldo Kalulu (8)
Home colours	Away colours

The 2021–22 season was the 94th season in the existence of FC Sochaux-Montbéliard and the club's 10th consecutive season in the second division of French football. In addition to the domestic league, Sochaux participated in this season's edition of the Coupe de France.

== Players ==
=== First-team squad ===
Note: Flags indicate national team as defined under FIFA eligibility rules; some limited exceptions apply. Players may hold more than one non-FIFA nationality.

No.	Pos.	Nation	Player
1	GK	ALG	Mehdi Jeannin
2	DF	FRA	Marvin Senaya (on loan from Strasbourg)
4	DF	SEN	Abdallah Ndour
6	MF	SEN	Ousseynou Thioune
7	FW	FRA	Tony Mauricio
8	MF	SEN	Joseph Lopy
9	FW	COD	Yann Kitala
10	MF	FRA	Younès Kaabouni
11	FW	FRA	Maxime Do Couto
14	MF	FRA	Rassoul Ndiaye
15	FW	FRA	Aldo Kalulu
16	GK	FRA	Maxence Prévot

No.	Pos.	Nation	Player
17	FW	GBS	Steve Ambri
18	DF	SEN	Christophe Diedhiou
19	DF	GUI	Florentin Pogba
20	FW	FRA	Hermann Tebily
22	DF	FRA	Ismaël Aaneba
23	MF	ALG	Samy Faraj
24	MF	FRA	Malcolm Viltard
25	DF	FRA	Nathan Zohoré
26	FW	FRA	Alan Virginius
28	MF	FRA	Gaëtan Weissbeck (captain)
29	DF	FRA	Valentin Henry
40	GK	FRA	Quentin Galvez-Diarra

=== Out on loan ===
Note: Flags indicate national team as defined under FIFA eligibility rules; some limited exceptions apply. Players may hold more than one non-FIFA nationality.

No. / Pos. / Nation / Player; — / FW / FRA / Walid Jarmouni (on loan at Sète)	No. / Pos. / Nation / Player; — / FW / MLI / Adama Niane (on loan at Dunkerque)

== Pre-season and friendlies ==
Win Draw Loss

2 July 2021 Friendly	Dijon (France)	1–2	(France) Sochaux	Besançon, France
18:00 CEST (UTC+2)				Stadium: Stade Léo Lagrange

== Competitions ==
=== Overall record ===
Competition	First match	Last match	Starting round	Final position	Record							
Competition	First match	Last match	Starting round	Final position	Pld	W	D	L	GF	GA	GD	Win %
Ligue 2	24 July 2021	14 May 2022	Matchday 1	5th	38	19	11	8	47	34	+13	50.00
Ligue 1 promotion play-offs	17 May 2022	20 May 2022	Round 1	Round 2	2	1	1	0	2	1	+1	50.00
Coupe de France	13 November 2021	18 December 2021	Seventh round	Round of 64	3	2	1	0	6	1	+5	66.67
Total					43	22	13	8	55	36	+19	51.16

Source: Soccerway

=== Ligue 2 ===
==== League table ====
Pos	Team	Pld	W	D	L	GF	GA	GD	Pts	Promotion or Relegation
3	Auxerre (O, P)	38	21	11	6	61	39	+22	74	Qualification to promotion play-offs
4	Paris FC	38	20	10	8	54	35	+19	70	Qualification to promotion play-offs
5	Sochaux	38	19	11	8	47	34	+13	68	Qualification to promotion play-offs
6	Guingamp	38	15	13	10	52	48	+4	58	
7	Caen	38	13	11	14	51	42	+9	50	

Source: Ligue 2
Rules for classification: 1) Points; 2) Goal difference; 3) Number of goals scored; 4) Head-to-head goal difference; 5) Fair play points
(O) Play-off winners; (P) Promoted

==== Results summary ====
Overall								Home						Away					
Pld	W	D	L	GF	GA	GD	Pts	W	D	L	GF	GA	GD	W	D	L	GF	GA	GD
38	19	11	8	47	34	+13	68	10	6	3	22	14	+8	9	5	5	25	20	+5

Source: Ligue 2

==== Results by round ====
Round	1	2	3	4	5	6	7	8	9	10	11	12	13	14	15	16	17	18	19	20	21	22	23	24	25	26	27	28	29	30	31	32	33	34	35	36	37	38
Ground	A	H	A	H	A	H	A	H	A	H	H	A	H	A	H	A	H	A	H	A	H	A	H	A	H	A	H	A	A	H	A	H	A	H	A	H	A	H
Result	W	L	W	W	D	W	L	W	W	D	W	W	D	D	L	L	W	D	D	W	W	D	D	W	L	L	W	L	D	W	W	W	W	D	W	W	L	D
Position	3	8	6	3	5	3	6	3	3	2	2	2	2	2	4	4	3	5	5	5	3	4	4	3	4	5	5	5	5	5	5	5	5	5	4	4	5	5

Source: Ligue 2
A = Away; H = Home; W = Win; D = Draw; L = Loss

==== Matches ====
The league fixtures were announced on 25 June 2021.

26 July 2021 1	Dijon	1–3	Sochaux	Dijon
20:45 CEST (UTC+2)	Benzia (yellow card) 18'; Rocchia (yellow card) 34'; Assalé 84'	Report	Mauricio (yellow card) 8'; Weissbeck 51'; Kalulu 74'; Pogba (yellow card) 90+3'; Virginius 90+7'	Stadium: Stade Gaston Gérard; Referee: Aurelien Petit

31 July 2021 2	Sochaux	0–2	Le Havre	Montbéliard
19:00 CEST (UTC+2)	Henry (yellow card) 6'; Thioune (yellow card) 47'; Weissbeck (yellow card) 90'	Report	Boutaïb 7', 27'	Stadium: Stade Auguste Bonal; Referee: Gael Angoula

7 August 2021 3	Caen	1–2	Sochaux	Caen
15:00 CEST (UTC+2)	Hountondji 90'; Inoussa (red card) 90+6'	Report	Aaneba (yellow card) 28'; Kalulu 63'; Virginus 90+1'	Stadium: Stade Michel d'Ornano; Attendance: 9,177; Referee: Frank Schneider

14 August 2021 4	Sochaux	1–0	Dunkerque	Montbéliard
19:00 CEST (UTC+2)	Kalulu (yellow card) 37'; Vannoye 43' (o.g.); Henry (yellow card) 90+7'	Report	Brahimi (yellow card) 20'; Maraval (yellow card) 37'; Dudouit (yellow card) 47'	Stadium: Stade Auguste Bonal; Referee: Bartolomeu Varela

21 August 2021 5	Amiens	0–0	Sochaux	Amiens
19:00 CEST (UTC+2)	Lomotey (yellow card) 32' (yellow-red card) 67'	Report	Lopy (yellow card) 60' (yellow-red card) 75'; Thioune (yellow card) 70'; Weissbeck (yellow card) 28'; Tebily (yellow card) 90+2'	Stadium: Stade de la Licorne; Referee: Jérôme Miguelgorry

28 August 2021 6	Sochaux	1–0	Grenoble	Montbéliard
19:00 CEST (UTC+2)	Weissbeck 43'; Kaabouni (yellow card) 78'; Ndiaye (yellow card) 90+4'	Report	Monfray (yellow card) 65'	Stadium: Stade Auguste Bonal; Referee: Olivier Thual

11 September 2021 7	Ajaccio	1–0	Sochaux	Ajaccio
19:00 CEST (UTC+2)	Cimignani (yellow card) 24'; Gonzalez (yellow card) 26'; Courtet (yellow card) 70', (goal) 75'; Moussiti-Oko (yellow card) 80'; Diallo (yellow card) 82'	Report	Pogba (yellow card) 29'; Ambri (yellow card) 79'	Stadium: Stade François Coty; Referee: Frank Schneider

18 September 2021 8	Sochaux	2–0	Paris FC	Montbéliard
15:00 CEST (UTC+2)	Kalulu 10'; Lopy (yellow card) 36'; Bernauer 86' (o.g.)	Report	Kanté (yellow card) 17'; Gory (yellow card) 82'	Stadium: Stade Auguste Bonal; Referee: Jérémie Pignard

21 September 2021 9	Guingamp	1–2	Sochaux	Guingamp
19:00 CEST (UTC+2)	M'Changama (yellow card) 5'; Mombris (yellow card) 13'; Sivis 45+2'; Muyumba (yellow card) 63'; Camara (yellow card) 76'; Merghem (yellow card) 90+5'	Report	Ndiaye 48', (yellow card) 58'; Do Couto (yellow card) 54'; Ambri 78' (pen.); Kitala (yellow card) 81'; Prévot (yellow card) 87'; Kalulu (yellow card) 90+8'	Stadium: Stade de Roudourou; Referee: Nicolas Rainville

24 September 2021 10	Sochaux	0–0	Auxerre	Montbéliard
21:00 CEST (UTC+2)		Report	Pellenard (yellow card) 65'; Ndom (yellow card) 77'	Stadium: Stade Auguste Bonal; Referee: Remi Landry

2 October 2021 11	Sochaux	1–0	Niort	Montbéliard
21:00 CEST (UTC+2)	Ndiaye (yellow card) 52'; Senaya (yellow card) 69'; Weissbeck (yellow card) 75'; Kalulu 83'	Report	Louiserre (yellow card) 90+1'	Stadium: Stade Auguste Bonal; Referee: Aurelien Petit

16 October 2021 12	Rodez	0–1	Sochaux	Rodez
19:00 CET (UTC+1)	Malanda (yellow card) 44'; Chougrani (yellow card) 55'; Danger (yellow card) 60'	Report	Mauricio 75'; Ambri (yellow card) 84'	Stadium: Stade Paul-Lignon; Referee: Olivier Thual

23 October 2021 13	Sochaux	1–1	Quevilly-Rouen	Montbéliard
21:00 CEST (UTC+2)	Do Couto 48', (yellow card) 56'; Ambri (yellow card) 52'	Report	Gbellé 3'; Sangaré (yellow card) 40'; Boé-Kane (yellow card) 76'	Stadium: Stade Auguste Bonal; Referee: Jeremy Stinat

30 October 2021 14	Nancy	0–0	Sochaux	Tomblaine
21:00 CEST (UTC+2)	Bertrand (yellow card) 25'	Report	Thioune (yellow card) 86'; Henry (yellow card) 88'	Stadium: Stade Marcel Picot; Referee: Benjamin Lepaysant

6 November 2021 15	Sochaux	0–1	Nîmes	Montbéliard
21:00 CEST (UTC+2)		Report	Sainte-Luce (yellow card) 59'; Benrahou 77'	Stadium: Stade Auguste Bonal; Referee: Bastien Dechepy

20 November 2021 16	Toulouse	4–1	Sochaux	Toulouse
15:00 CET (UTC+1)	Evitt-Healey 25', 53', 59', 75'; Van den Boomen (yellow card) 47'	Report	Mauricio (yellow card) 25'; Weissbeck 37'; Thioune (yellow card) 56'; Tebily (yellow card) 74'	Stadium: Stadium de Toulouse; Referee: Olivier Thual

3 December 2021 17	Sochaux	2–1	Pau	Montbéliard
21:00 CET (UTC+1)	Ndour 47'; Thioune (yellow card) 53'; Lopy 90+3'	Report	Kouassi (yellow card) 55' (yellow-red card) 56'; Evans 70', (yellow card) 75'	Stadium: Stade Auguste Bonal; Referee: Nicolas Rainville

11 December 2021 18	Bastia	2–2	Sochaux	Furiani
19:00 CET (UTC+1)	Salles-Lamonge (yellow card) 26'; Vincent 28'; Saadi 35'; Le Cardinal (yellow card) 56'	Report	Kalulu (penalty missed) 67', 79'; Kitala (yellow card) 77'; Ndiaye 87'	Stadium: Stade Armand Cesari; Referee: Aurelien Petit

21 December 2021 19	Sochaux	1–1	Valenciennes	Montbéliard
20:45 CET (UTC+1)	Thioune (yellow card) 31'; Mauricio (yellow card) 46', (goal) 63'	Report	Ayité 11'; Lecoeuche (yellow card) 45+1' (yellow-red card) 54'; Chevalier (yellow card) 86'	Stadium: Stade Auguste Bonal; Referee: Abdelatif Kherradji

8 January 2022 20	Le Havre	0–1	Sochaux	Le Havre
15:00 CET (UTC+1)	Touré (yellow card) 89'	Report	Aaneba (yellow card) 58'; Kitala 65', (yellow card) 69'	Stadium: Stade Océane; Referee: Marc Bollengier

15 January 2022 21	Sochaux	3–2	Caen	Montbéliard
20:00 CET (UTC+1)	Senaya (yellow card) 14'; Henry (yellow card) 16'; Kitala (yellow card) 40'; Kalulu 52', (yellow card) 90+2'; Mauricio (yellow card) 64'; Virginius 66'; Ndour (yellow card) 83'; Do Couto (yellow card) 90+2', (goal) 90+3'	Report	Gonçalves (yellow card) 13' da Costa 17', (yellow card) 37' (yellow-red card) 60'; Deminguet 28' (pen.), (yellow card) 67'; Rivierez (yellow card) 69'; Teikeu (yellow card) 90+4'	Stadium: Stade Auguste Bonal; Attendance: 5,000; Referee: Arnaud Petit

22 January 2022 22	Dunkerque	0–0	Sochaux	Dunkirk
19:00 CET (UTC+1)	Yohou (yellow card) 37'; A. Gomis (yellow card) 53'; Dudouit (yellow card) 73'; Pierre (yellow card) 77'; Majouga (yellow card) 78'	Report	Weissbeck (yellow card) 18'	Stadium: Stade Marcel-Tribut; Referee: Arnaud Baert

5 February 2022 23	Sochaux	1–1	Amiens	Montbéliard
19:00 CET (UTC+1)	Do Couto 21'		Badji 39'	Stadium: Stade Auguste Bonal; Referee: Frank Schneider

12 February 2022 24	Grenoble	1–3	Sochaux	Grenoble
19:00 CET (UTC+1)	Tell 1'; Bambock (yellow card) 10'; Ravet (yellow card) 24'; Perez (yellow card) 86'	Report	Weissbeck 31'; Thioune (yellow card) 42'; Aaneba (yellow card) 50'; Do Couto (red card) 52'; Mauricio 87' (pen.); Kitala 90+1'	Stadium: Stade des Alpes; Referee: Abdelatif Kherradji

19 February 2022 25	Sochaux	0–1	Ajaccio	Montbéliard
19:00 CET (UTC+1)	Virginius (yellow card) 24'; Kitala (yellow card) 75'; Mauricio (yellow card) 81'	Report	El Idrissy (yellow card) 14', (goal) 47'; Youssouf (yellow card) 18'; Cimignani (red card) 77'	Stadium: Stade Auguste Bonal; Referee: Thomas Léonard

26 February 2022 26	Paris FC	3–1	Sochaux	Paris
15:00 CET (UTC+1)	Siby (yellow card) 64'; Boutaïb 69'; Guilavogui 73'; Gueye 76'	Report	Mauricio 35'; Thioune (yellow card) 80'	Stadium: Stade Sébastien Charléty; Referee: Guillaume Paradis

5 March 2022 27	Sochaux	1–0	Guingamp	Montbéliard
19:00 CET (UTC+1)	Virginius 68'	Report		Stadium: Stade Auguste Bonal; Attendance: Alexandre Perreau Niel

12 March 2022 28	Auxerre	3–2	Sochaux	Auxerre
15:00 CET (UTC+1)	Sakhi 5'; Autret 18'; Hein (yellow card) 35'; Charbonnier 56'	Report	Kitala 36'; Aaneba (yellow card) 55'; Mauricio 76'; Kalulu (yellow card) 86'	Stadium: Stade de l'Abbé-Deschamps; Referee: Benjamin Lepaysant

15 March 2022 29	Niort	1–1	Sochaux	Niort
20:00 CET (UTC+1)	Moutachy (yellow card) 36'; Sissoko 48' (pen.); Merdji (yellow card) 58'	Report	Kalulu 8', (yellow card) 80'; Thioune (yellow card) 38'; Do Couto (yellow card) 43'; Weissbeck (yellow card) 62'	Stadium: Stade René Gaillard; Referee: Nicolas Rainville

19 March 2022 30	Sochaux	2–0	Rodez	Montbéliard
20:00 CET (UTC+1)	Weissbeck (yellow card) 2'; Kalulu 13'; Ndiaye 36'; Pogba (yellow card) 50'; Ndour (yellow card) 83'; Ambri (yellow card) 90+1'	Report	Bardy (yellow card) 3'; Rajot (yellow card) 7'; Chougrani (yellow card) 45'; Célestine (yellow card) 90+3'	Stadium: Stade Auguste Bonal; Referee: Bartolomeu Varela

2 April 2022 31	Quevilly-Rouen	0–2	Sochaux	Le Petit-Quevilly
19:00 CET (UTC+1)	Bahassa (yellow card) 71'; Sidibé (yellow card) 74'	Report	Mauricio 45+1'; Ambri 65'	Stadium: Stade Robert Diochon; Referee: Pierre Legat

9 April 2022 32	Sochaux	1–0	Nancy	Montbéliard
20:00 CET (UTC+1)	Ndiaye 36'; Mauricio (yellow card) 45+2'; Ndour (yellow card) 64'	Report	Bobichon (yellow card) 45+2'; Valette (red card) 89'	Stadium: Stade Auguste Bonal; Referee: Guillaume Paradis

16 April 2022 33	Nîmes	1–3	Sochaux	Nîmes
19:00 CET (UTC+1)	Ponceau 4'; Fomba (yellow card) 35'; Koné (penalty missed) 90+4'	Report	Thioune 39'; Virginius 70'; Kaabouni (yellow card) 73'; Kitala 80'; Ndour (yellow card) 90+3'	Stadium: Stade des Costières; Referee: Mikaël Lesage

19 April 2022 34	Sochaux	1–1	Toulouse	Montbéliard
20:00 CET (UTC+1)	Ndiaye 6'; Mauricio (yellow card) 38'; Ndour (yellow card) 43'; Diedhiou (yellow card) 49'; Henry (yellow card) 90'	Report	Rouault 50', (yellow card) 80'; Ratão (yellow card) 90'	Stadium: Stade Auguste Bonal; Referee: Benjamin Lepaysant

22 April 2022 35	Pau	0–1	Sochaux	Pau
21:00 CET (UTC+1)	Poha (yellow card) 35'	Report	Kalulu 13'; Aaneba (yellow card) 73'	Stadium: Nouste Camp; Referee: Bartolomeu Varela

30 April 2022 36	Sochaux	2–1	Bastia	Montbéliard
20:00 CET (UTC+1)	Robic 68' (o.g.); Ambri (yellow card) 73'; Henry 90'; Kalulu (yellow card) 90+3'	Report	Palun (yellow card) 13'; Kaïboué (yellow card) 20'; Sylla (yellow card) 56'; Pogba 79' (o.g.)	Stadium: Stade Auguste Bonal; Referee: Marc Bollengier

7 May 2022 37	Valenciennes	1–0	Sochaux	Valenciennes
19:00 CET (UTC+1)	Ntim (yellow card) 39'; Bonnet 50'; Cuffaut (yellow card) 54'; Robail (yellow card) 81'	Report	Ndiaye (yellow card) 36'; Henry (yellow card) 52'; Kitala (yellow card) 90+3'	Stadium: Stade du Hainaut; Referee: Jeremy Stinat

14 May 2022 38	Sochaux	2–2	Dijon	Montbéliard
19:00 CET (UTC+1)	Weissbeck 2', 51'	Report	Le Bihan 58'; Philippoteaux 78'; Traoré (yellow card) 87'	Stadium: Stade Auguste Bonal; Referee: Frank Schneider

==== Promotion play-offs ====
17 May 2022 Round 1	Paris FC	1–2	Sochaux	Paris
20:30 CEST (UTC+2)	Name (penalty missed) 3', (yellow card) 27' (yellow-red card) 43'; Siby 8'; Alfarela (penalty missed) 12'; Camara (yellow card) 67'; Iglesias (yellow card) 73'	Report	Diedhiou (yellow card) 2'; Ambri 45+1'; Weissbeck (yellow card) 62'; Do Couto 90+2'	Stadium: Stade Sébastien Charléty; Attendance: 8,000; Referee: Jérémie Pignard

20 May 2022 Round 2	Auxerre	0–0 (a.e.t.) (5–4 p)	Sochaux	Auxerre
20:30 CEST (UTC+2)	Charbonnier (yellow card) 66'; Bernard (yellow card) 92'	Report	Henry (yellow card) 60'; Kitala (yellow card) 108'; Prévot (yellow card) 116'	Stadium: Stade de l'Abbé-Deschamps; Referee: Jérôme Brisard
	Penalties
	Dugimont (penalty scored); Jubal (penalty scored); Perrin (penalty scored); Charbonnier (penalty scored); Touré (penalty scored)		(penalty scored) Pogba; (penalty scored) Henry; (penalty missed) Kitala; (penalty scored) Virginius; (penalty scored) Ambri

=== Coupe de France ===
13 November 2021 Seventh round	Bresse Jura Foot	1–3	Sochaux	Louhans
14:30 CET (UTC+1)	Elbachir 90'	Report	Faraj 56'; Tebily 66'; Niane 79'	Stadium: Stade du Bram; Referee: William Toulliou

27 November 2021 Eighth round	AS Montchat Lyon	0–3	Sochaux	Lyon
16:00 CET (UTC+1)		Report	Niane 6', 9'; Kitala 28'	Stadium: Stade Vuillermet; Referee: Julien Rouquette

18 December 2021 Round of 64	Sochaux	0–0 (4–5 p)	Nantes	Montbéliard
16:00 CET (UTC+1)		Report		Stadium: Stade Auguste Bonal; Referee: Benoît Bastien
