= 2022–23 FC Sochaux-Montbéliard season =

FC Sochaux-Montbéliard
2022–23 season
- Owner: Nenking Group
- Chairman: Frankie Yau
- Manager: Olivier Guegan
- Stadium: Stade Auguste Bonal
- Ligue 2: 9th (demoted)
- Coupe de France: Eighth round
- Top goalscorer: League: Ibrahim Sissoko (12); All: Moussa Doumbia (13)
Home colours

The 2022–23 season was the 95th in the history of FC Sochaux-Montbéliard and their 11th consecutive season in the second division. The club participated in Ligue 2 and the Coupe de France.

== Players ==
As of 25 July 2022.

Note: Flags indicate national team as defined under FIFA eligibility rules; some limited exceptions apply. Players may hold more than one non-FIFA nationality.

No.	Pos.	Nation	Player
3	DF	NGR	Valentine Ozornwafor (on loan from Charleroi)
4	DF	SEN	Abdallah Ndour
5	DF	MAR	Saad Agouzoul
6	MF	FRA	Roli Pereira de Sa
7	MF	FRA	Tony Mauricio
8	MF	SEN	Joseph Lopy
9	FW	FRA	Ibrahim Sissoko
10	MF	FRA	Gaëtan Weissbeck (captain)
11	FW	FRA	Maxime Do Couto
14	MF	FRA	Rassoul Ndiaye
15	FW	COD	Aldo Kalulu
16	GK	FRA	Maxence Prévot
17	MF	FRA	Adrien Delphis
18	DF	FRA	Yoël Armougom
19	DF	FRA	Daylam Meddah

No.	Pos.	Nation	Player
20	MF	MLI	Sambou Yatabaré
21	FW	ESP	Eliezer Mayenda
22	DF	FRA	Ismaël Aaneba
23	MF	ALG	Samy Faraj
24	MF	FRA	Malcolm Viltard
26	FW	FRA	Alan Virginius
27	FW	FRA	Hermann Tebily
28	DF	FRA	Julien Faussurier
29	DF	FRA	Valentin Henry
30	GK	ALG	Mehdi Jeannin
50	GK	FRA	Manu Agro
70	FW	MLI	Moussa Doumbia
77	MF	SEN	Franck Kanouté (on loan from Cercle Brugge)
80	MF	FRA	Skelly Alvero
95	MF	FRA	Younès Kaabouni

== Pre-season and friendlies ==
Win Draw Loss

8 July 2022 Friendly	Sochaux (France)	3–1	(France) UNFP	Delle
16:30 CEST (UTC+2)				Stadium: Stade des Fromentaux

12 July 2022 Friendly	Bourg-en-Bresse (France)	0–0	(France) Sochaux	Aix-les-Bains
10:30 CEST (UTC+2)				Stadium: Stade Municipal Jacques Forestier

16 July 2022 Friendly	Stade Nyonnais (Switzerland)	1–4	(France) Sochaux	Nyon
10:30 CEST (UTC+2)				Stadium: Colovray Sports Centre

23 July 2022 Friendly	Metz (France)	1–0	(France) Sochaux	Metz
18:00 CEST (UTC+2)	Jallow 2'			Stadium: Stade Saint-Symphorien

8 December 2022 Friendly	Reims (France)	3–0	(France) Sochaux	San Pedro del Pinatar, Spain
16:00 CET (UTC+1)				Stadium: Pinatar Arena Football Center

17 December 2022 Friendly	Lyon (France)	1–1	(France) Sochaux	Décines-Charpieu
17:00 CET (UTC+1)				Stadium: Terrain d’Honneur Gérard Houllier

20 December 2022 Friendly	Clermont (France)	0–1	(France) Sochaux	TBD
--:-- CET (UTC+1)

== Competitions ==
=== Overall record ===
Competition	First match	Last match	Starting round	Final position	Record							
Competition	First match	Last match	Starting round	Final position	Pld	W	D	L	GF	GA	GD	Win %
Ligue 2	1 August 2022	2 June 2023	Matchday 1	9th	38	15	7	16	54	41	+13	39.47
Coupe de France	29 October 2022	19 November 2022	Seventh round	Eighth round	2	1	1	0	5	2	+3	50.00
Total					40	16	8	16	59	43	+16	40.00

Source: Soccerway

=== Ligue 2 ===
==== League table ====
Pos	Team	Pld	W	D	L	GF	GA	GD	Pts	Promotion or Relegation
7	Paris FC	38	15	10	13	45	43	+2	55	
8	Saint-Étienne	38	15	11	12	63	57	+6	53 (Note: Saint-Étienne were deducted three points for a pitch invasion during their relegation play-off the previous season.)	
9	Sochaux (D, R)	38	15	7	16	54	41	+13	52	Relegation to Championnat National
10	Grenoble	38	14	9	15	33	36	−3	51	
11	Quevilly-Rouen	38	12	14	12	47	49	−2	50	

Source: Ligue 2
Rules for classification: 1) Points; 2) Goal difference; 3) Number of goals scored; 4) Head-to-head goal difference; 5) Fair play points
(D) Disqualified; (R) Relegated

==== Results summary ====
Overall								Home						Away					
Pld	W	D	L	GF	GA	GD	Pts	W	D	L	GF	GA	GD	W	D	L	GF	GA	GD
38	15	7	16	54	41	+13	52	9	4	6	31	18	+13	6	3	10	23	23	0

Source: Ligue 2

==== Results by round ====
Round	1	2	3	4	5	6	7	8	9	10	11	12	13	14	15	16	17	18	19	20	21
Ground	H	A	H	A	H	A	H	A	H	A	H	A	H	A	H	H	A	A	H	A	H
Result	D	L	L	W	W	W	W	W	W	L	W	D	D	L	W	W	L				
Position	9	16	17	14	6	6	3	1	1	3	4	3	3	4	3	2	3				

Source: Ligue 2
A = Away; H = Home; W = Win; D = Draw; L = Loss

==== Matches ====
The league fixtures were announced on 17 June 2022.

1 August 2022 1	Sochaux	0–0	Paris FC	Montbéliard
20:45 CEST (UTC+2)		Report		Stadium: Stade Auguste Bonal; Attendance: 12,647; Referee: Aurélien Petit

6 August 2022 2	Grenoble	1–0	Sochaux	Grenoble
19:00 CEST (UTC+2)	Sanyang 55'	Report		Stadium: Stade des Alpes; Attendance: 4,589; Referee: Romain Lissorgue

13 August 2022 3	Sochaux	0–1	Amiens	Montbéliard
19:00 CEST (UTC+2)		Report	Fofana 71'	Stadium: Stade Auguste Bonal; Attendance: 10,263; Referee: Rémi Landry

20 August 2022 4	Pau	0–3	Sochaux	Pau
19:00 CEST (UTC+2)		Report	Weissbeck 33'; Sissoko 74'; Do Couto 78'	Stadium: Nouste Camp; Attendance: 3,099; Referee: Gaël Angoula

27 August 2022 5	Sochaux	3–0	Niort	Montbéliard
19:00 CEST (UTC+2)	Weissbeck 16'; Kaboré 62' (o.g.); Kalulu 90+2'	Report		Stadium: Stade Auguste Bonal; Attendance: 8,980; Referee: Abdelatif Kherradji

30 August 2022 6	Guingamp	1–2	Sochaux	Guingamp
20:45 CEST (UTC+2)	Lemonnier 21'	Report	N'Dour 37'; Doumbia 80'	Stadium: Stade de Roudourou; Attendance: 8,136; Referee: Pierre Legat

2 September 2022 7	Sochaux	4–1	Laval	Montbéliard
20:45 CEST (UTC+2)	Weissbeck 45+2'; Doumbia 71'; Mauricio 80'; Do Couto 82'	Report	Maggiotti 28'	Stadium: Stade Auguste Bonal; Attendance: 9,311; Referee: William Toulliou

10 September 2022 8	Dijon	0–2	Sochaux	Dijon
19:00 CEST (UTC+2)	Traoré (yellow card) 35'; Coulibaly (yellow card) 90+4'	Report	Ndour (yellow card) 14'; Sissoko 26'; Doumbia 55'; Do Couto (yellow card) 84'; Agouzoul (yellow card) 90+4'	Stadium: Stade Gaston Gérard; Attendance: 10,004; Referee: (France) Remi Landry

17 September 2022 9	Sochaux	3–1	Nîmes	Montbéliard
19:00 CEST (UTC+2)	Sissoko (yellow card) 20' (goal) 34' 53'; Mauricio 22'	Report	N'Guessan 4' (yellow card) 76'	Stadium: Stade Auguste Bonal; Attendance: 11,287; Referee: (France) Florent Batta

1 October 2022 10	Valenciennes	2–1	Sochaux	Valenciennes
19:00 CEST (UTC+2)	Kaba (yellow card) 15'; Cuffaut 25' (pen.); Diliberto 58' (yellow card) 90+4'; Picouleau (yellow card) 60'; Innocenti (yellow card) 72'	Report	Kalulu 31'; Ndiaye (yellow card) 70'; Do Couto (yellow card) 89'	Stadium: Stade du Hainaut; Attendance: 5,704; Referee: (France) Pierre Legat

10 October 2022 11	Sochaux	2–1	Saint-Étienne	Montbéliard
20:45 CEST (UTC+2)	Agouzoul 3'; Weissbeck (yellow card) 40'; Doumbia (yellow card) 45+1' (goal) 48'; Aaneba (yellow card) 56'; Faussurier (yellow card) 66'	Report	Sergi Palencia (yellow card) 19'; Giraudon (yellow card) 36'; Krasso 69' (pen.) (red card) 90+4'	Stadium: Stade Auguste Bonal; Attendance: 19,205; Referee: (France) Guillaume Paradis

15 October 2022 12	Metz	0–0	Sochaux	Longeville-lès-Metz
19:00 CEST (UTC+2)	Jallow (yellow card) 10'	Report	Weissbeck (yellow card) 19'	Stadium: Stade Saint-Symphorien; Referee: (France) Romain Lissorgue

22 October 2022 13	Sochaux	2–2	Quevilly-Rouen	Montbéliard
19:00 CEST (UTC+2)	Aaneba (yellow card) 29'; Sissoko 57' (pen.) 90+5' (pen.); Ndiaye (yellow card) 80'	Report	Ben Youssef 32' (yellow card) 45'; Sissoko (yellow card) 35'; Soumaré (yellow card) 56' (goal) 71'	Stadium: Stade Auguste Bonal; Attendance: 11,037; Referee: (France) Benjamin Lepaysant

5 November 2022 14	Annecy	2–1	Sochaux	Annecy
19:00 CET (UTC+1)	Baldé 71'; Mouanga 81'	Report	Sissoko 7'; Prévot (yellow card) 77'; Armougom (yellow card) 77'; Aaneba (yellow card) 80'; Henry (yellow card) 86'	Stadium: Parc des Sports; Attendance: 6,145; Referee: (France) Nicolas Rainville

12 November 2022 15	Sochaux	1–0	Bastia	Montbéliard
19:00 CET (UTC+1)	Sissoko 38' (pen.); Faussurier (yellow card) 42'; Kanouté (yellow card) 70'; Alvero (yellow card) 90+4'	Report	Guidi (yellow card) 20'; Ducrocq (yellow card) 24'; Sainati (yellow card) 37'; Van Den Kerkhof (yellow card) 45'	Stadium: Stade Auguste Bonal; Attendance: 11,175; Referee: (France) Remi Landry

26 December 2022 16	Sochaux	1–0	Rodez	Montbéliard
21:00 CET (UTC+1)	Agouzoul (yellow card) 49'; Kalulu 73'	Report	Senaya (yellow card) 59'	Stadium: Stade Auguste Bonal; Attendance: 11,719; Referee: (France) Mathieu Vernice

30 December 2022 17	Bordeaux	2–1	Sochaux	Bordeaux
17:00 CET (UTC+1)	Maja 30'; Davitashvili 32'; Bakwa (yellow card) 62'; Delaurier-Chaubet (red card) 74'	Report	Kanouté 59'; Yatabaré (yellow card) 81'; Do Couto (yellow card) 90+2'; Prévot (yellow card) 90+3'	Stadium: Matmut Atlantique; Attendance: 22,363; Referee: (France) Abdelatif Kherradji

10 January 2023 18	Le Havre	1–0	Sochaux	Le Havre
20:45 CET (UTC+1)	Sangante (yellow card) 67'; Alvero 76' (o.g.)	Report	Agouzoul (yellow card) 13'; Alvero (yellow card) 49'; Doumbia (yellow card) 82'; Aaneba (yellow card) 88'; Kanouté (yellow card) 90+2'	Stadium: Stade Océane; Attendance: 12,026; Referee: Aurélien Petit

20 January 2023 19	Sochaux	1–2	Caen	Montbéliard
18:30 CET (UTC+1)	Doumbia 8'; Kanouté (yellow card) 26'; Aaneba (yellow card) 76'	Report	Daubin (yellow card) 58'; Mendy (penalty scored) 64'; Brahimi 89'	Stadium: Stade Auguste Bonal; Attendance: 8,771; Referee: Azzédine Souifi

28 January 2023 20	Saint-Étienne	2–3	Sochaux	Saint-Étienne
15:00 CET (UTC+1)	Bamba (yellow card) 44'; Krasso (penalty scored) 50'; Charbonnier (yellow card) 57', (goal) 78'	Report	Mauricio 3'; Faussurier (yellow card) 36'; Weissbeck (yellow card) 38'; Ndiaye (yellow card) 75'; Dossou 89'; Sissoko 90+4', (yellow card) 90+6'	Stadium: Stade Geoffroy-Guichard; Attendance: 18,041; Referee: Mikael Lesage

31 January 2023 21	Sochaux	4–0	Valenciennes	Montbéliard
20:45 CET (UTC+1)	Linguet 14' (o.g.); Mauricio 20'; Doumbia (yellow card) 51', (goal) 64'; Dossou 87'	Report	Picouleau (yellow card) 16'; Touré (yellow card) 49'	Stadium: Stade Auguste Bonal; Attendance: 8,623; Referee: Olivier Thual

3 February 2022 22	Rodez	1–2	Sochaux	Rodez
20:45 CET (UTC+1)	Depres 41'; Boma (yellow card) 78'	Report	Doumbia 11'; Sissoko (yellow card) 17', (penalty scored) 79'	Stadium: Stade Paul-Lignon; Attendance: 2,300; Referee: William Toulliou

11 February 2023 23	Sochaux	1–1	Le Havre	Montbéliard
19:00 CET (UTC+1)	Henry (yellow card) 10'; Kalulu 87'; Weissbeck (yellow card) 90+14'	Report	Sangante 4'; Lekhal (yellow card) 34'; Desmas (yellow card) 75'; Mahmoud (yellow card) 90+10'	Stadium: Stade Auguste Bonal; Attendance: 15,203; Referee: Abdelatif Kherradji

18 February 2023 24	Quevilly-Rouen	0–0	Sochaux	Le Petit-Quevilly
19:00 CET (UTC+1)	Soumaré (yellow card) 61'; Pendant (yellow card) 65'; Ben Youssef (yellow card) 90+2'	Report	Ndour (yellow card) 14'; Le Tallec (yellow card) 52'; Sissoko (red card) 90+1'	Stadium: Stade Robert Diochon; Attendance: 4,083; Referee: Faouzi Benchabane

25 February 2023 25	Sochaux	5–1	Annecy	Montbéliard
19:00 CET (UTC+1)	Doumbia 2', (penalty scored) 38'; Weissbeck 17'; Mauricio 58'; Mayenda 90+2'	Report	Lajugie (yellow card) 35'; Sahi (penalty scored) 63'	Stadium: Stade Auguste Bonal; Attendance: 10,645; Referee: Mikael Lesage

6 March 2023 26	Caen	0–0	Sochaux	Caen
20:45 CET (UTC+1)	Court (yellow card) 29'; Cissé (yellow card) 54'	Report	Weissbeck (yellow card) 55'	Stadium: Stade Michel d'Ornano; Attendance: 15,125; Referee: Romain Lissorgue

11 March 2023 27	Sochaux	1–1	Bordeaux	Montbéliard
15:00 CET (UTC+1)	Weissbeck 40'; Doumbia (yellow card) 63'; Aaneba (yellow card) 90+4'	Report	Bakwa 30'; N'Simba (yellow card) 75'; Badji (yellow card) 90+4'	Stadium: Stade Auguste Bonal; Attendance: 18,835; Referee: Benjamin Lepaysant

18 March 2023 28	Sochaux	1–0	Grenoble	Montbéliard
19:00 CET (UTC+1)	Ndiaye (yellow card) 42'; Kanouté (yellow card) 82'; Kalulu 88'	Report	Perez (yellow card) 18'; Maubleu (yellow card) 50'; Ba (yellow card) 61'; Sanyang (yellow card) 71'	Stadium: Stade Auguste Bonal; Attendance: 12,000; Referee: Nicolas Rainville

1 April 2023 29	Bastia	3–2	Sochaux	Furiani
19:00 CET (UTC+1)	Alfarela 11'; Salles-Lamonge (yellow card) 35'; Ndiaye (yellow card) 43'; Ducrocq (yellow card) 67'; Magri 73'; Santelli (yellow card) 75'; Djoco 76'	Report	Sissoko 29'; Kalulu 32'	Stadium: Stade Armand-Cesari; Attendance: 11,686; Referee: Olivier Thual

8 April 2023 30	Niort	0–3	Sochaux	Niort
19:00 CEST (UTC+2)	Kaboré (yellow card) 48'	Report	Doumbia 4'; Sissoko 29'; Ndiaye 40'; Agouzoul (yellow card) 48'	Stadium: Stade René Gaillard; Attendance: 2,298; Referee: Romain Lissorgue

15 April 2023 31	Sochaux	2–3	Pau	Montbéliard
19:00 CET (UTC+1)	Kalulu (yellow card) 34'; Weissbeck (yellow card) 45'; Mauricio (yellow card) 54', (goal) 58'; Faussurier (yellow card) 77'; Alvero 90+3'	Report	Sylvestre 10'; D'Almeida (yellow card) 28'; Begraoui 32', 90+6' (pen.); Boisgard (yellow card) 77'	Stadium: Stade Auguste Bonal; Attendance: 11,858; Referee: Faouzi Benchabane

22 April 2023 32	Laval	2–1	Sochaux	Laval
19:00 CEST (UTC+2)	Elisor 7'; Baldé (yellow card) 24'; Bobichon 29'	Report	Aaneba (yellow card) 12'; Kanouté (yellow card) 50'; Doumbia 85'	Stadium: Stade Francis Le Basser; Attendance: 7,771; Referee: Karim Abed

1 May 2023 33	Sochaux	0–2	Dijon	Montbéliard
19:00 CET (UTC+1)	Meddah (red card) 13'; Kanouté (yellow card) 48'; Ndiaye (yellow card) 90+1'; Kalulu (yellow card) 90+3'	Report	Thioune (yellow card) 24'; Aké 33'; Ahlinvi 39'; Congré (yellow card) 90+3'	Stadium: Stade Auguste Bonal; Attendance: 10,577; Referee: Benjamin Lepaysant

6 May 2023 34	Amiens	1–0	Sochaux	Amiens
19:00 CET (UTC+1)	Bandé (yellow card) 56'; Ring (yellow card) 65'; Ilenikhena 76'	Report	Doumbia (yellow card) 54'	Stadium: Stade de la Licorne; Attendance: 10,407; Referee: William Touillou

13 May 2023 35	Sochaux	0–1	Guingamp	Montbéliard
19:00 CET (UTC+1)	Ndiaye (yellow card) 34'; Makosso (yellow card) 90+7'	Report	Guillaume 61'; Sivis (yellow card) 77'; Picard (yellow card) 90'	Stadium: Stade Auguste Bonal; Attendance: 10,144; Referee: Guillaume Paradis

20 May 2023 36	Paris FC	2–1	Sochaux	Paris
19:00 CEST (UTC+2)	Guilavogui (yellow card) 60', (goal) 81'; Hamel 90'	Report	Alvero 27', (yellow card) 90+2'	Stadium: Stade Sébastien Charléty; Attendance: 4,762; Referee: Faouzi Benchabane

26 May 2023 37	Sochaux	0–1	Metz	Montbéliard
20:45 CET (UTC+1)	Meddah (yellow card) 8'; Alvero (red card) 61'; Agouzoul (yellow card) 67'	Report	Sabaly 49'	Stadium: Stade Auguste Bonal; Attendance: 15,714; Referee: Aurélien Petit

2 June 2023 38	Nîmes	3–1	Sochaux	Nîmes
19:00 CET (UTC+1)	Tchokounté 9', 75'; Fofana (yellow card) 45'; Megier (yellow card) 82'; Saïd (penalty scored) 86'	Report	Sissoko 29'; Meddah (yellow card) 40'; Galves (yellow card) 85'	Stadium: Stade des Antonins; Attendance: 1,143; Referee: William Toulliou

=== Coupe de France ===
29 October 2022 Seventh round	Sochaux	3–0	SSEP Hombourg-Haut	Montbéliard
14:00 CET	Doumbia 72' (pen.) 90'; Do Couto 79'	Report	Anthony Babit (yellow card) 28'; Abdalali Ezzaitouni (yellow card) 69'; Khalid Babaya (yellow card) 69'	Stadium: Stade Auguste Bonal; Attendance: 6,139; Referee: (France) Thomas Vincent

19 November 2022 Eighth round	Thaon	2–2 (3–1 p)	Sochaux	Thaon-les-Vosges
17:00 CET	Diego Alves (yellow card) 22'; Loris Petitpain (yellow card) 40' (red card) 58'; Yohan Dufour 56'; Tom Condi 86' (yellow card) 90'	Report	Meddah (yellow card) 6'; Mauricio 21' (pen.) 84'; Do Couto (yellow card) 33'; Armougom (yellow card) 44' (yellow-red card) 48'; Ndour (yellow card) 80'	Stadium: Stade Robert Sayer; Attendance: 1,442; Referee: (France) Romain Lissorgue
