= 2021–22 Toulouse FC season =

Toulouse
2021–22 season
- President: Damien Comolli
- Head coach: Philippe Montanier
- Stadium: Stadium de Toulouse
- Ligue 2: 1st (promoted)
- Coupe de France: Round of 16
- Top goalscorer: League: Rhys Healey (20); All: Rhys Healey (22)
Home colours	Away colours

The 2021–22 season was the 52nd season in the existence of Toulouse FC and the club's second consecutive season in the second division of French football. In addition to the domestic league, Toulouse participated in this season's edition of the Coupe de France.

== Players ==
=== First-team squad ===
As of 10 January 2022.

Note: Flags indicate national team as defined under FIFA eligibility rules; some limited exceptions apply. Players may hold more than one non-FIFA nationality.

No.	Pos.	Nation	Player
1	GK	FRA	Thomas Himeur
2	DF	DEN	Rasmus Nicolaisen
3	DF	DEN	Mikkel Desler
5	MF	AUS	Denis Genreau
7	FW	JPN	Ado Onaiwu
8	MF	NED	Branco van den Boomen
9	FW	ENG	Rhys Healey
10	MF	BEL	Brecht Dejaegere (captain)
11	FW	FRA	Yanis Begraoui
12	DF	GUI	Issiaga Sylla
13	MF	FRA	Kléri Serber
14	DF	FRA	Logan Costa
15	MF	FRA	Tom Rapnouil

No.	Pos.	Nation	Player
17	MF	NED	Stijn Spierings
18	MF	FRA	Sam Sanna
19	DF	FRA	Bafodé Diakité
20	FW	JAM	Junior Flemmings
21	FW	BRA	Rafael Ratão
22	MF	FIN	Naatan Skyttä
23	DF	FRA	Moussa Diarra
24	DF	FRA	Anthony Rouault
25	MF	CMR	Stève Mvoué
26	MF	FRA	Mamady Bangré
29	MF	FRA	Nathan Ngoumou
30	GK	FRA	Maxime Dupé
40	GK	SWE	Isak Pettersson

=== Out on loan ===
Note: Flags indicate national team as defined under FIFA eligibility rules; some limited exceptions apply. Players may hold more than one non-FIFA nationality.

No. / Pos. / Nation / Player; — / MF / SUI / Samuel Kasongo (on loan to Neuchâtel Xamax)	No. / Pos. / Nation / Player; — / MF / FRA / Kalidou Sidibé (on loan to Quevilly-Rouen)

== Pre-season and friendlies ==
Win Draw Loss Fixtures

17 July 2021 Friendly	Toulouse	2–0	Rodez	Montauban, France
18:00 CEST (UTC+2)				Stadium: Complexe Sportif Jean Verbeke

3 September 2021 Friendly	Toulouse	3–2	Pau	Tarbes, France
11:00 CEST (UTC+2)				Stadium: Stade Maurice-Trélut

== Competitions ==
=== Overall record ===
Competition	First match	Last match	Starting round	Final position	Record							
Competition	First match	Last match	Starting round	Final position	Pld	W	D	L	GF	GA	GD	Win %
Ligue 2	24 July 2021	14 May 2022	Matchday 1	Winners	38	23	10	5	82	33	+49	60.53
Coupe de France	13 November 2021	29 January 2022	Seventh round	Round of 16	5	3	1	1	8	3	+5	60.00
Total					43	26	11	6	90	36	+54	60.47

Source: Soccerway

=== Ligue 2 ===
==== League table ====
Pos	Team	Pld	W	D	L	GF	GA	GD	Pts	Promotion or Relegation
1	Toulouse (C, P)	38	23	10	5	82	33	+49	79	Promotion to Ligue 1
2	Ajaccio (P)	38	22	9	7	39	19	+20	75	Promotion to Ligue 1
3	Auxerre (O, P)	38	21	11	6	61	39	+22	74	Qualification to promotion play-offs
4	Paris FC	38	20	10	8	54	35	+19	70	Qualification to promotion play-offs
5	Sochaux	38	19	11	8	47	34	+13	68	Qualification to promotion play-offs

Source: Ligue 2
Rules for classification: 1) Points; 2) Goal difference; 3) Number of goals scored; 4) Head-to-head goal difference; 5) Fair play points
(C) Champions; (O) Play-off winners; (P) Promoted

==== Results summary ====
Overall								Home						Away					
Pld	W	D	L	GF	GA	GD	Pts	W	D	L	GF	GA	GD	W	D	L	GF	GA	GD
38	23	10	5	82	33	+49	79	14	4	1	52	14	+38	9	6	4	30	19	+11

Source: Ligue 2

==== Results by round ====
Round	1	2	3	4	5	6	7	8	9	10	11	12	13	14	15	16	17	18	19	20	21	22	23	24	25	26	27	28	29	30	31	32	33	34	35	36	37	38
Ground	H	A	A	H	A	H	A	H	A	H	A	H	A	H	A	H	A	H	A	H	H	A	H	A	H	A	H	A	H	A	H	A	H	A	H	A	H	A
Result	D	W	W	W	W	W	D	W	W	L	D	W	D	D	D	W	L	D	W	W	D	D	W	W	W	W	W	L	W	W	W	W	W	D	W	L	W	L
Position	7	4	2	2	1	1	1	1	1	1	1	1	1	1	1	1	1	2	2	2	2	1	1	1	1	1	1	1	1	1	1	1	1	1	1	1	1	1

Source: Ligue 2
A = Away; H = Home; W = Win; D = Draw; L = Loss

==== Matches ====
The league fixtures were announced on 25 June 2021.

24 July 2021 1	Toulouse	2–2	Ajaccio	Toulouse
19:00 CEST (UTC+2)	Healey 34', (yellow card) 50'; Kalulu 54' (o.g.); Adli (red card) 90+5'	Report	Vidal (yellow card) 10' (yellow-red card) 38'; Youssouf (yellow card) 14'; Laçi 35', 59'; Huard (yellow card) 40'; Leroy (yellow card) 77'; Avinel (yellow card) 90+4'	Stadium: Stadium de Toulouse; Referee: Frank Schneider

31 July 2021 2	Nancy	0–4	Toulouse	Tomblaine
19:00 CEST (UTC+2)		Report	Healey 1', 70'; Gabrielsen 27'; Rouault 41'; Sylla (yellow card) 43'; Dejaegere (yellow card) 54'	Stadium: Stade Marcel Picot; Referee: Alexandre Perreau Niel

7 August 2021 3	Pau	0–1	Toulouse	Pau
19:00 CEST (UTC+2)	Dembélé (yellow card) 82'	Report	Dejaegere 7' van den Boomen (yellow card) 81'	Stadium: Nouste Camp; Referee: Aurélien Petit

14 August 2021 4	Toulouse	1–0	Bastia	Toulouse
15:00 CEST (UTC+2)	van den Boomen 23' (pen.)	Report	Ducrocq (yellow card) 9'; Vincent (yellow card) 57'	Stadium: Stadium de Toulouse; Referee: Antony Gautier

21 August 2021 5	Dijon	2–4	Toulouse	Dijon
15:00 CEST (UTC+2)	Scheidler 31'; Younoussa (yellow card) 45+3'; Le Bihan 81' (pen.); Congré (yellow card) 86'; Traoré (yellow card) 87'	Report	Healey (yellow card) 28'; Onaiwu 37'; Ngoumou 51', 62'; Gabrielsen (yellow card) 54'; Spierings (yellow card) 57' van den Boomen 87' (pen.)	Stadium: Stade Gaston Gérard; Referee: Nicolas Rainville

28 August 2021 6	Toulouse	1–0	Valenciennes	Toulouse
15:00 CEST (UTC+2)	Healey (yellow card) 13'; Onaiwu 45+2'; Ngoumou (yellow card) 59'; Dejaegere (yellow card) 76'	Report		Stadium: Stadium de Toulouse; Referee: Mathieu Vernice

13 September 2021 7	Le Havre	1–1	Toulouse	Le Havre
20:45 CEST (UTC+2)	Boutaïb (red card) 62'; Cornette 67'; Lekhal (yellow card) 90+5'	Report	Rouault (yellow card) 13'; Onaiwu 34', (yellow card) 51'; Nicolaisen (yellow card) 55'; Desler (yellow card) 60'	Stadium: Stade Océane; Referee: Gaël Angoula

18 September 2021 8	Toulouse	4–1	Grenoble	Toulouse
15:00 CEST (UTC+2)	Healey 23'; Onaiwu 34', 47'; Desler (yellow card) 54'; Spierings (yellow card) 45+1'; Ngoumou 71'	Report	Anani 79'	Stadium: Stadium de Toulouse; Referee: Alexandre Perreau Niel

21 September 2021 9	Dunkerque	0–2	Toulouse	Dunkirk
20:00 CEST (UTC+2)	Ba (yellow card) 27'; Bruneel (yellow card) 54'	Report	Desler 30'; Nicolaisen (yellow card) 40'; Sylla (yellow card) 61'; Healey 67'	Stadium: Stade Marcel-Tribut; Referee: Abdelatif Kherradji

27 September 2021 10	Toulouse	2–3	Caen	Toulouse
20:45 CEST (UTC+2)	Van den Boomen 15' (pen.), (yellow card) 17', (goal) 30'; Spierings (yellow card) 50'	Report	Wadja 8'; Mendy (yellow card) 32'; Diakité 39' (o.g.); Deminguet 45+1'	Stadium: Stadium de Toulouse; Attendance: 9,856; Referee: Bartolomeu Varela

2 October 2021 11	Amiens	0–0	Toulouse	Amiens
15:00 CEST (UTC+2)	Pavlović (yellow card) 90+3'	Report	Dejaegere (yellow card) 28'; Spierings (yellow card) 73'	Stadium: Stade de la Licorne; Referee: Mathieu Vernice

16 October 2021 12	Toulouse	6–0	Auxerre	Toulouse
15:00 CEST (UTC+2)	Healey 4', 72'; Ratão 7', 46', (yellow card) 47'; Mvoué 24'; Genreau (yellow card) 44'; Nicolaisen 83'	Report	Dugimont (red card) 49'	Stadium: Stadium de Toulouse; Referee: Frank Schneider

23 October 2021 13	Paris FC	2–2	Toulouse	Paris
15:00 CEST (UTC+2)	Guilavogui 35'; Caddy 45+1' (pen.); Camara (yellow card) 71'; Laura (yellow card) 78'	Report	Diakité 52', (yellow card) 84'; Healey 85'	Stadium: Stade Sébastien Charléty; Referee: Guillaume Paradis

30 October 2021 14	Toulouse	2–2	Guingamp	Toulouse
15:00 CEST (UTC+2)	Spierings 58'; Ngoumou 62'; Van den Boomen (yellow card) 85'; Desler (yellow card) 90+2'	Report	Diarra (yellow card) 2'; Pierrot 25'; M'Changama 89'; Livolant (yellow card) 90+3'	Stadium: Stadium de Toulouse; Referee: Nicolas Rainville

6 November 2021 15	Quevilly-Rouen	0–0	Toulouse	Rouen
19:00 CET (UTC+1)	Diaby (yellow card) 90'	Report	Spierings (yellow card) 84'	Stadium: Stade Robert Diochon; Referee: Gaël Angoula

20 November 2021 16	Toulouse	4–1	Sochaux	Toulouse
15:00 CET (UTC+1)	Healey 25', 53', 59', 75'; Van den Boomen (yellow card) 47'	Report	Mauricio (yellow card) 25'; Weissbeck 37'; Thioune (yellow card) 56'; Tebily (yellow card) 74'	Stadium: Stadium de Toulouse; Referee: Olivier Thual

6 December 2021 17	Niort	2–1	Toulouse	Niort
20:45 CET (UTC+1)	Sissoko 50'; Zemzemi 62'; Conté (yellow card) 81'	Report	Ratão 76'; Genreau (yellow card) 90'	Stadium: Stade René Gaillard; Referee: Eric Wattellier

13 December 2021 18	Toulouse	1–1	Rodez	Toulouse
20:45 CET (UTC+1)	Ratão 14', (yellow card) 51'; Nicolaisen (yellow card) 69'; Healey (yellow card) 90+3'	Report	Danger (yellow card) 36'; Célestine (yellow card) 40'; Diakité 84' (o.g.); Bardy (yellow card) 86'	Stadium: Stadium de Toulouse; Referee: Nicolas Rainville

21 December 2021 19	Nîmes	1–2	Toulouse	Nîmes
20:45 CET (UTC+1)	Koné (yellow card) 5'; Eliasson (yellow card) 16'; Cubas (yellow card) 75', (goal) 82'; Martinez (yellow card) 78'	Report	Nicolaisen 3'; Healey 60'; Onaiwu (yellow card) 83'; Genreau (yellow card) 86'	Stadium: Stade des Costières; Referee: Willy Delajod

15 January 2022 21	Toulouse	1–1	Pau	Toulouse
19:00 CET (UTC+1)	Healey (yellow card) 45'; Van den Boomen 78'; Spierings (yellow card) 85'; Rouault (yellow card) 90+3'	Report	Dembélé (yellow card) 23'; Daubin (yellow card) 32'; Nišić 54'; Koffi (yellow card) 77'	Stadium: Stadium de Toulouse; Referee: Frank Schneider

19 January 2022 20	Toulouse	4–0	Nancy	Toulouse
19:00 CET (UTC+1)	Onaiwu 29'; Genreau 30', (yellow card) 51'; Van den Boomen 55'; Nicolaisen (yellow card) 78'; Ratão 88'	Report	Basila (red card) 25'; Akichi (yellow card) 30'; Bianda (yellow card) 61'; Bobichon (yellow card) 66'	Stadium: Stadium de Toulouse; Referee: Olivier Thual
Note: The match was originally scheduled for 10 January 2022, but was postponed to 19 January 2022.

22 January 2022 22	Bastia	0–0	Toulouse	Furiani
19:00 CET (UTC+1)	Vincent (yellow card) 39'; Guidi (yellow card) 46'; Santelli (yellow card) 86'; Kaïboué (red card) 87'	Report	Healey (yellow card) 43'; Spierings (yellow card) 80'; Desler (yellow card) 86', (red card) 87'	Stadium: Stade Armand Cesari; Referee: Nicolas Rainville

5 February 2022 23	Toulouse	4–1	Dijon	Toulouse
15:00 CET (UTC+1)	Ngoumou 24'; Nicolaisen 44'; Diakité (yellow card) 57'; Ratão 65'; Onaiwu 81'	Report	Scheidler 33'; Coulibaly (yellow card) 50'; Fofana (yellow card) 84'	Stadium: Stadium de Toulouse; Referee: Marc Bollengier

12 February 2022 24	Valenciennes	1–3	Toulouse	Valenciennes
15:00 CET (UTC+1)		Report		Stadium: Stade du Hainaut

21 February 2022 25	Toulouse	4–0	Le Havre	Toulouse
20:45 CET (UTC+1)	Spierings (yellow card) 19'; Nicolaisen 23'; Onaiwu 27'; Van den Boomen 48' (pen.); Healey (yellow card) 71'; Ngoumou 80'	Report	Lekhal (yellow card) 22'; Bonnet (yellow card) 47'	Stadium: Stadium de Toulouse; Referee: Mathieu Vernice

28 February 2022 26	Grenoble	0–2	Toulouse	Grenoble
20:45 CET (UTC+1)	Perez (yellow card) 5'; Cissé (yellow card) 59'	Report	Van den Boomen (yellow card) 27', (goal) 74'; Healey (yellow card) 39'; Ngoumou 84'	Stadium: Stade des Alpes; Referee: Olivier Thual

7 March 2022 27	Toulouse	2–0	Dunkerque	Toulouse
20:45 CET (UTC+1)	Van den Boomen 34'; Ratão 73'	Report	Thiam (red card) 64'; Niané (yellow card) 65'; Huysman (yellow card) 81'	Stadium: Stadium de Toulouse; Referee: Arnaud Baert

12 March 2022 28	Caen	4–1	Toulouse	Caen
19:00 CET (UTC+1)	Mendy 18'; Court 31'; Oniangué 51' da Costa 71'	Report	Spierings (yellow card) 32'; Ratão 48'	Stadium: Stade Michel d'Ornano; Referee: Guillaume Paradis

15 March 2022 29	Toulouse	6–0	Amiens	Toulouse
19:00 CET (UTC+1)	Healey 10', 70'; Mendy 12' (o.g.); Nicolaisen (yellow card) 18'; Ngoumou 30'; Van den Boomen 53'; Diarra (yellow card) 67'; Bangré 84'	Report	Sy (yellow card) 27'; Lomotey (yellow card) 30' (yellow-red card) 58'	Stadium: Stadium de Toulouse; Referee: Remi Landry

19 March 2022 30	Auxerre	1–2	Toulouse	Auxerre
15:00 CET (UTC+1)	Charbonnier (red card) 38'; Pellenard (yellow card) 42'; Dugimont 71'	Report	Spierings (yellow card) 9'; Van den Boomen 33' (pen.), 41'	Stadium: Stade de l'Abbé-Deschamps; Referee: Stéphanie Frappart

2 April 2022 31	Toulouse	2–1	Paris FC	Toulouse
15:00 CET (UTC+1)	Diakité 62'; Healey 84'	Report	López 15'	Stadium: Stadium de Toulouse; Referee: Aurelien Petit

9 April 2022 32	Guingamp	2–4	Toulouse	Guingamp
15:00 CET (UTC+1)	Ba 31'; Merghem 34', (yellow card) 72'; Quemper (yellow card) 74'; Diarra (yellow card) 81'	Report	Ratão 15', (yellow card) 59'; Healey 38', 48', 75'; Desler (yellow card) 40'; Spierings (yellow card) 68'	Stadium: Stade de Roudourou; Referee: Remi Landry

16 April 2022 33	Toulouse	2–0	Rouen	Toulouse
15:00 CET (UTC+1)	Nicolaisen (yellow card) 70'; Healey 75'; Ratão 90+2'	Report	Boé-Kane (yellow card) 18'; Dekoke (yellow card) 50'	Stadium: Stadium de Toulouse; Referee: Romain Lissorgue

19 April 2022 34	Sochaux	1–1	Toulouse	Montbéliard
20:00 CET (UTC+1)	Ndiaye 6'; Mauricio (yellow card) 38'; Ndour (yellow card) 43'; Diedhiou (yellow card) 49'; Henry (yellow card) 90'	Report	Rouault 50', (yellow card) 80'; Ratão (yellow card) 90'	Stadium: Stade Auguste Bonal; Referee: Benjamin Lepaysant

25 April 2022 35	Toulouse	2–0	Niort	Toulouse
15:00 CET (UTC+1)	Dejaegere 21'; Onaiwu 78'	Report	Kilama (yellow card) 41'; Cassubie (yellow card) 52'	Stadium: Stadium de Toulouse; Referee: Alexandre Perreau Niel

2 May 2022 36	Rodez	1–0	Toulouse	Rodez
20:45 CEST (UTC+2)	Danger 64' (pen.); Obiang (yellow card) 90+5'	Report	Bangré (yellow card) 87'	Stadium: Stade Paul-Lignon; Referee: Florent Batta

7 May 2022 37	Toulouse	2–1	Nîmes	Toulouse
19:00 CET (UTC+1)	Spierings (yellow card) 27'; Onaiwu 49'; Genreau 78'	Report	Briançon 25'; Fomba (yellow card) 31'	Stadium: Stadium de Toulouse; Referee: Jérôme Miguelgorry

14 May 2022 38	Ajaccio	1–0	Toulouse	Ajaccio
19:00 CET (UTC+1)	Nouri 28' (pen.)	Report	Costa (yellow card) 27'	Stadium: Stade François Coty; Referee: Bastien Dechepy

=== Coupe de France ===
13 November 2021 Seventh round	FC Libourne	0–0 (1–3 p)	Toulouse	Libourne
16:05 CET (UTC+1)		Report		Stadium: Stade Jean-Antoine Moueix; Referee: Romain Delpech

28 November 2021 Eighth round	Trélissac-Antonne Périgord FC	1–3	Toulouse	Trélissac
13:45 CET (UTC+1)	Luis Castro 69' (pen.)	Report	Costa 75'; Hamel 90' (o.g.); Healey 90+3'	Stadium: Stade Firmin Daudou; Referee: Arnaud Baert

18 December 2021 Round of 64	Toulouse	4–1	Nîmes	Toulouse
13:45 CET (UTC+1)	Onaiwu 35', 45'; Healey 70'; Ratão 73'	Report	Doucouré 15'	Stadium: Stadium de Toulouse; Referee: Thomas Léonard

2 January 2022 Round of 32	Cannes	0–1	Toulouse	Cannes
13:45 CET (UTC+1)		Report	Ratão 52'	Stadium: Stade Pierre de Coubertin; Referee: Romain Lissorgue

29 January 2022 Round of 16	Toulouse	0–1	FC Versailles 78	Toulouse
16:15 CET (UTC+1)		Report	Djoco 79'	Stadium: Stadium de Toulouse (Note: Tie reversed due to FC Versailles 78 not being able to provide a suitable stadium.); Referee: Jérémy Stinat
