= Bonal =

Bonal may refer to:

== People ==
- Auguste Bonal (1898–1945), French industrialist, resistance fighter, and football manager
  - Stade Auguste-Bonal, football stadium
- Denise Bonal (1921–2011), French actress
- Élie Bonal (born 1945), French former rugby union and league footballer
- François de Bonal (1734–1800), Catholic Bishop and figure in the French Revolution
- Gérard Bonal (1941–2022), French writer and biographer
- Jean-Marie Bonal (born 1943), French rugby player
- Luis Bonal (1908–1986), Spanish footballer
- Patrick Bonal, French rugby player
- Raymond Bonal (1908–1986), French Catholic religious leader
  - Bonalists, a defunct French congregation of Catholic priests founded by the above
- Séverine Bonal (born 1972), French archer

== Places ==
- Bonal, Karnataka, a village in the southern state of Karnataka, India

== Others ==
- Bonal Gentiane Quina, an quinquina

== See also ==
- Banal (disambiguation)
