= Tebily =

Tebily is a surname. Notable people with the surname include:

- Hermann Tebily (born 2002), French footballer
- Olivier Tébily (born 1975), Ivorian footballer
