= Banal =

Banal may refer to:

- Of or pertaining to the ban (medieval) or banalité
- Banal nationalism

== Media ==
- Banal (2008 film), a Philippine action film
- Banal (2019 film), a Philippine horror film

== People ==
- A. J. Banal (born 1988), Filipino boxer
- Joel Banal (born 1958), Filipino basketball player
- Koy Banal, Filipino basketball coach

== See also ==
- Banality (disambiguation)
