= Rassoul Ndiaye =

Senegalese footballer (born 2001)

Personal information
- Full name: Rassoul Kader Ndiaye
- Date of birth: 11 December 2001 (age 24)
- Place of birth: Besançon, France
- Height: 1.79 m (5 ft 10 in)
- Position: Central midfielder

Team information
- Current team: Le Havre
- Number: 14

Youth career
- 2014–2019: Sochaux

Senior career*
Years	Team	Apps	(Gls)
2018–2020	Sochaux II	22	(4)
2019–2023	Sochaux	92	(6)
2023–	Le Havre	84	(5)
2024	Le Havre II	5	(1)

International career^{‡}
2022–	Senegal U23	1	(0)
2024–	Senegal	3	(0)
- * Club domestic league appearances and goals as of 18 October 2026 ‡ National team caps and goals as of 21:20, 4 October 2026 (UTC)

Rassoul Ndiaye (born 11 December 2001) is a professional footballer who plays as a central midfielder for Ligue 1 club Le Havre. Born in France, he plays for the Senegal national team.

== Club career ==
Ndiaye is a youth product of Sochaux, and signed his first professional contract with the club on 20 March 2019. On 13 August 2019, he made his professional debut for Sochaux in a 2–1 Coupe de la Ligue loss to Paris FC.

== International career ==
Ndiaye holds French and Senegalese nationalities. He was called up to represent the Senegal U23s for a set of 2023 Africa U-23 Cup of Nations qualification matches.

== Career statistics ==
=== Club ===
As of match played 18 October 2026

Appearances and goals by club, season and competition
Club	Season	League			Cup		League cup		Europe		Total	
Club	Season	Division	Apps	Goals	Apps	Goals	Apps	Goals	Apps	Goals	Apps	Goals
Sochaux II	2018–19	CFA 2	10	1	–		–		–		10	1
Sochaux II	2019–20	CFA 2	12	3	–		–		–		12	3
Sochaux II	Total		22	4	–		–		–		22	4
Sochaux	2019–20	Ligue 2	1	0	1	0	1	0	—		3	0
Sochaux	2020–21	Ligue 2	25	0	2	0	–		–		27	0
Sochaux	2021–22	Ligue 2	37	5	3	0	–		–		40	5
Sochaux	2022–23	Ligue 2	31	1	2	0	–		–		33	1
Sochaux	Total		94	6	8	0	–		–		102	6
Le Havre	2023–24	Ligue 1	19	0	1	0	–		–		20	0
Le Havre	2024–25	Ligue 1	27	1	1	0	–		–		28	1
Le Havre	2025–26	Ligue 1	33	4	1	0	—		—		34	4
Le Havre	2026–27	Ligue 1	5	0	0	0	—		—		5	0
Le Havre	Total		84	5	3	0	–		–		87	5
Le Havre II	2023–24	CFA 2	5	1	–		–		–		5	1
Career total			205	16	11	0	1	0	0	0	217	16

=== International ===
As of match played 4 October 2026

Appearances and goals by national team and year
National team	Year	Apps	Goals
Senegal	2024	1	0
Senegal	2025	1	0
Senegal	2026	1	0
Total		3	0
