= Saad Agouzoul =

Moroccan footballer

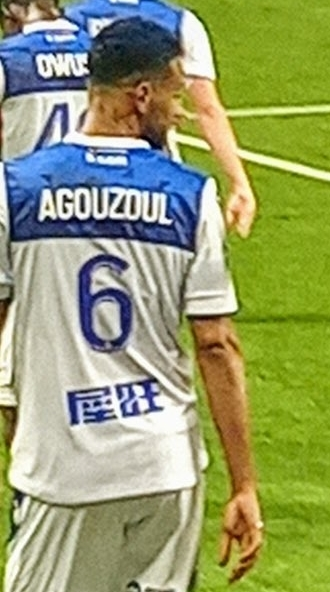
- Agouzoul with Auxerre in 2024

Personal information
- Date of birth: 10 August 1997 (age 29)
- Place of birth: Marrakesh, Morocco
- Height: 1.91 m (6 ft 3 in)
- Position: Centre-back

Team information
- Current team: Sochaux

Youth career
- 2009–2017: Kawkab Marrakech

Senior career*
| Years | Team | Apps | (Gls) |
| 2017–2019 | Kawkab Marrakech | 47 | (3) |
| 2019–2022 | Lille II | 18 | (0) |
| 2020–2021 | → Mouscron (loan) | 33 | (1) |
| 2022–2023 | Sochaux | 37 | (1) |
| 2023–2026 | Auxerre | 16 | (0) |
| 2024–2025 | Auxerre II | 2 | (0) |
| 2025 | → Radomiak Radom (loan) | 13 | (1) |
| 2025–2026 | → Omonia (loan) | 11 | (0) |
| 2026– | Sochaux | 0 | (0) |

International career
| 2019 | Morocco U23 | 2 | (0) |
- * Club domestic league appearances and goals as of 22 May 2026

Saad Agouzoul (born 10 August 1997) is a Moroccan professional footballer who plays as a centre-back for French Ligue 2 club Sochaux.

== Club career ==
A youth product of Kawkab Marrakech, Agouzoul debuted with the first team in 2017.

On 11 July 2019, he signed a professional contract with Ligue 1 side Lille for five years.

On 1 July 2022, he joined Sochaux on a three-year deal.

On 22 July 2026, Agouzoul returned to Sochaux on a one-season contract.

== International career ==
Agouzoul was called up to a pair of 2019 Africa U-23 Cup of Nations qualification matches for the Morocco U23s in March 2019.

== Honours ==
Auxerre

- Ligue 2: 2023–24

Omonia

- Cypriot First Division: 2025–26
