= Alan Virginius =

French footballer (born 2003)

Personal information
- Full name: Alan Virginius
- Date of birth: 3 January 2003 (age 23)
- Place of birth: Soisy-sous-Montmorency, France
- Height: 1.80 m (5 ft 11 in)
- Position: Left winger

Team information
- Current team: Young Boys
- Number: 21

Youth career
- 2009–2017: FC Soisy-Andilly-Margency
- 2017–2018: Entente SSG
- 2018–2020: Sochaux

Senior career*
Years	Team	Apps	(Gls)
2020–2021	Sochaux B	3	(2)
2020–2022	Sochaux	46	(8)
2022–2025	Lille	17	(1)
2022–2024	Lille B	8	(3)
2024	→ Clermont (loan)	14	(0)
2024–2025	→ Young Boys (loan)	32	(2)
2025–	Young Boys	39	(7)

International career^{‡}
2019	France U16	6	(2)
2019	France U17	1	(0)
2021–2022	France U19	15	(5)
2022–2024	France U20	12	(5)
2024–	France U21	1	(0)
- * Club domestic league appearances and goals as of 11:20, 20 September 2026 (UTC) ‡ National team caps and goals as of 15 October 2024

Alan Virginius (born 3 January 2003) is a French professional footballer who plays as a left winger for Swiss Super League club Young Boys.

== Club career ==
=== Sochaux ===
On 6 July 2020, Virginius signed his first professional contract with Sochaux. Virginius made his professional debut with Sochaux in a 2–2 Ligue 2 tie with Rodez on 19 September 2020.

=== Lille ===
On 17 August 2022, Virginius signed with Ligue 1 side Lille.

==== Loan to Clermont ====
On 9 January 2024, Virginius moved on loan to Clermont until the end of the season.

==== Loan to Young Boys ====
On 3 August 2024, Virginius was loaned to Swiss Super League club Young Boys for the 2024–25 season, with an option to buy.

== International career ==
Virginius was called up to captain the France U20s for the 2023 FIFA U-20 World Cup.

== Career statistics ==
As of match played 19 September 2026

Appearances and goals by club, season and competition
Club	Season	League			National Cup		Europe		Other		Total	
Club	Season	Division	Apps	Goals	Apps	Goals	Apps	Goals	Apps	Goals	Apps	Goals
Sochaux B	2020–21	CFA 2	1	0	—		—		—		1	0
Sochaux B	2021–22	CFA 2	2	2	—		—		—		2	2
Sochaux B	Total		3	2	—		—		—		3	2
Sochaux	2020–21	Ligue 2	15	3	1	0	—		—		16	3
Sochaux	2021–22	Ligue 2	31	5	1	0	—		2 (Note: Appearances in Ligue 1 relegation/promotion play-offs)	0	34	5
Sochaux	Total		46	8	2	0	—		2	0	50	8
Lille	2022–23	Ligue 1	15	1	3	0	0	0	—		18	1
Lille	2023–24	Ligue 1	2	0	0	0	3 (Note: Appearances in UEFA Conference League)	0	—		5	0
Lille	Total		17	1	3	0	3	0	—		23	1
Lille B	2022–23	CFA 2	5	3	—		—		—		5	3
Lille B	2023–24	CFA 2	3	0	—		—		—		3	0
Lille B	Total		8	3	—		—		—		8	3
Clermont (loan)	2023–24	Ligue 1	14	0	1	0	—		—		15	0
Young Boys (loan)	2024–25	Swiss Super League	32	2	5	4	8 (Note: Appearances in UEFA Champions League)	1	—		45	7
Young Boys	2025–26	Swiss Super League	34	5	1	0	7 (Note: Appearances in UEFA Europa League)	0	—		42	5
Young Boys	2026–27	Swiss Super League	5	2	0	0	—		—		5	2
Young Boys	Total		39	7	1	0	7	0	—		47	7
Career total			159	23	12	4	18	1	2	0	191	28

== Honours ==
Individual

- UEFA European Under-19 Championship Team of the Tournament: 2022
