= Banality (disambiguation) =

Ban (medieval) or banality is the power to summon free men for military service.

Banality may also refer to:

- Banalité, a payment serfs were required to make to their lords
- Eichmann in Jerusalem, a 1963 book by Hannah Arendt which popularised the phrase "banality of evil"
- Banality (sculpture series), a series of works by Jeff Koons exhibited in 1988
