= Yann Kitala =

Footballer (born 1998)

Personal information
- Full name: Yann Trécy Kitala
- Date of birth: 9 April 1998 (age 28)
- Place of birth: Paris, France
- Height: 1.86 m (6 ft 1 in)
- Position: Forward

Team information
- Current team: Farul Constanța
- Number: 19

Youth career
- 2004–2011: Paris FC
- 2011–2013: INF Clairefontaine
- 2013–2017: Lyon

Senior career*
Years	Team	Apps	(Gls)
2016–2019	Lyon B	63	(20)
2019–2020	Lyon	0	(0)
2019–2020	→ Lorient (loan)	10	(2)
2019	→ Lorient B (loan)	2	(1)
2020–2022	Sochaux	28	(5)
2021	Sochaux B	4	(1)
2022–2025	Le Havre	32	(2)
2023–2024	→ Almere City (loan)	15	(2)
2025–2026	Vizela	22	(1)
2026–	Farul Constanța	1	(0)

International career
2015	DR Congo U20	1	(0)
- * Club domestic league appearances and goals as of 25 October 2026

Yann Trécy Kitala (born 9 April 1998) is a professional footballer who plays as a forward for Liga I club Farul Constanța. Born in France, he represented DR Congo at youth international level.

== Club career ==
On 30 August 2019, Kitala joined Lorient on loan from Lyon. He made his debut with Lorient in a 2–0 Ligue 2 win over Clermont on 14 September 2019.

In June 2020, Kitala moved to Sochaux on a three-year contract. Sochaux paid a transfer of €300,000 plus a potential €500,000 in bonuses.

On 13 July 2022, Kitala signed a three-year contract with Le Havre.

On 1 September 2023, Kitala moved on loan to Almere City in the Netherlands.

On 22 September 2025, Kitala signed a two-season contract with Vizela in Portugal.

On 19 September 2026, Kitala joined Farul Constanța in Romania for one season.

== International career ==
Born in France, Kitala is of Congolese descent. He represented the DR Congo U20s in a friendly against the England U20s on 7 October 2015.

== Career statistics ==
As of match played 25 October 2026

Appearances and goals by club, season and competition
Club	Season	League			National cup (Note: Includes Coupe de France, KNVB Beker)		Europe		Other		Total	
Club	Season	Division	Apps	Goals	Apps	Goals	Apps	Goals	Apps	Goals	Apps	Goals
Lyon B	2016–17	CFA	12	2	–		–		–		12	2
Lyon B	2017–18	Championnat National 2	24	5	–		–		–		24	5
Lyon B	2018–19	Championnat National 2	27	13	–		–		–		27	13
Lyon B	Total		63	20	–		–		–		63	20
Lorient (loan)	2019–20	Ligue 2	10	2	4	0	–		–		14	2
Lorient B (loan)	2019–20	Championnat National 2	2	1	–		–		–		2	1
Sochaux	2020–21	Ligue 2	1	1	0	0	–		–		1	1
Sochaux	2021–22	Ligue 2	27	4	3	2	–		2 (Note: Appearances in Ligue 1 promotion/relegation play-offs)	0	32	6
Sochaux	Total		28	5	3	2	–		–		31	7
Sochaux B	2021–22	Championnat National 3	4	1	–		–		–		4	1
Le Havre	2022–23	Ligue 2	32	2	0	0	–		–		32	2
Le Havre	2023–24	Ligue 1	0	0	–		–		–		0	0
Le Havre	2024–25	Ligue 1	0	0	0	0	–		–		0	0
Le Havre	Total		32	2	0	0	–		–		32	2
Almere City (loan)	2023–24	Eredivisie	15	2	2	0	–		–		17	2
Vizela	2025–26	Liga Portugal 2	22	1	0	0	–		–		22	1
Farul Constanța	2026–27	Liga I	1	0	–		–		–		1	0
Career Total			177	34	9	2	–		2	0	188	36

== Honours ==
Lorient

- Ligue 2: 2019–20

Le Havre

- Ligue 2: 2022–23
