= Gérard Bonal =

French writer (1941–2022)

- Born: 18 April 1941; Paris, France
- Died: 13 June 2022 (aged 81)
- Occupations: Writer; Biographer

Gérard Bonal (18 April 1941 – 13 June 2022) was a French writer and biographer.

== Biography ==
A former journalist with Réalités and GEO, Bonal became a writer. He specialized in the works of Colette, founding the magazine Les Cahiers Colette in 1975. He devoted several works to the author, such as Colette intime. In 1995, he wrote his first play, Colette Music-Hall, presented at the Théâtre de la Huchette. He wrote the script for two documentaries as well: Colette, premier portrait (1995) and J'appartiens à un pays que j'ai quitté (2004). He served as president of the Société des amis de Colette and was vice-president of the association "La Maison de Colette".

Gérard Bonal died on 13 June 2022 at the age of 81.

== Distinctions ==
- Knight of the Ordre des Arts et des Lettres
- Officer of the Order of Merit of the Italian Republic

== Publications ==
=== Novels ===
- La Lanceuse de couteaux (1971)
- Paysage avec la chute d'Icare (1973)
- L'Amateur d'images (1980)
- Premières neiges de l'absence (1984)
- L'Hôtel des Cinq-Continents (1993)

=== Essays ===
- Colette par moi-même (1982)
- Besoin de province (2002)
- Saint-Germain-des-Prés (2008)
- Des Américaines à Paris (2017)
- Colette et les bêtes (2019)

=== Biographies ===
- L'Album Gérard Philipe (1999)
- Les Renaud-Barrault (2000)
- Simone de Beauvoir (2001)
- Un acteur dans son temps, Gérard Philipe (2003)
- Colette intime (2004)
- Gérard Philipe (2009)
- Colette (2014)
- Joséphine Baker, du music-hall au Panthéon (2021)

=== Collections ===
- Colette journaliste (2010)
- Colette (2011)
- Lettres à Colette (2012)
- Un bien grand amour, Lettres de Colette à Musidora (2014)

=== Theatre ===
- Colette Music-hall (1995)
- Madame Colette a-t-elle une âme ? (2007)
- Chéri (2011)
- Madame Max (2015)

=== Documentaries ===
- Colette (1995)
- Colette : « J'appartiens à un pays que j'ai quitté » (2004)
- Les Renaud-Barrault, bâtisseurs de théâtre (2000)
- Gérard Philipe, un homme pas un ange (2003)
- Martine Carol, plus dure sera la chute (2017)
