= Bonalists =

The Bonalists or the Congregation of the Priests of St. Mary is a defunct French congregation of Catholic priests founded by the theologian Raymond Bonal.

The congregation was approved in 1665 by Pope Alexander VII and in 1678 by King Louis XIV. The order ran a number of seminaries. These seminaries gradually lost students. In 1723 the seminary at Villefranche was turned over to the Lazarists, and in 1752 the seminary at Toulouse. Eventually the Lazarists absorbed the whole congregation.
