= Raymond Bonal =

Raymond Bonal (1600 – 1653) was a founder of the Congregation of the Priests of St. Mary (Bonalists), a Catholic religious order active in France in the sixteenth and seventeenth centuries.

== Biography ==
Bonal was born on 15 August 1600 in Villefranche-de-Rouergue. He studied classics and philosophy at the Jesuit college of Cahors, followed by theology, canon law, and civil law at the University of Toulouse, receiving his doctorate in 1628.

In 1632, Bonal and two other priests took up residence in a house near the church of Our Lady of Pity in Villefranche. There, Bonal hoped to found a community inspired by the teachings of Francis de Sales. The community grew quickly, and in 1639 was put in charge of the parish of Foix in the Roman Catholic Diocese of Pamiers.

A few years later, Bonal opened a seminary at Villefranche, of which he became the director. He opened a second seminary at Toulouse, along with a college, in 1650. He traveled to Agde in 1653 with the intent of founding a third seminary, but died there in an epidemic.
