= Samy Faraj =

French footballer (born 2001)

Personal information
- Date of birth: 4 October 2001 (age 25)
- Place of birth: Croix, France
- Height: 1.78 m (5 ft 10 in)
- Position: Midfielder

Team information
- Current team: Čelik Zenica
- Number: 11

Youth career
- 2010–2018: Lille
- 2018–2019: Sochaux

Senior career*
Years	Team	Apps	(Gls)
2019–2024	Sochaux II	27	(12)
2020–2024	Sochaux	8	(0)
2023	→ Paris 13 Atletico (loan)	7	(1)
2024–2025	Asteras Tripolis	1	(0)
2025–2026	Radnik Bijeljina	19	(1)
2026–	Čelik Zenica	9	(1)

International career
2017	Morocco U16	4	(0)
2020	Algeria U20	2	(0)
- * Club domestic league appearances and goals as of 31 October 2026

Samy Faraj (born 4 October 2001) is a professional footballer who plays as a midfielder for Bosnian Premier League club Čelik Zenica. Born in France, Faraj represents Algeria internationally, after previously representing Morocco.

== Club career ==
Faraj is a youth product of Lille since he was nine, and moved to Sochaux in 2018. Faraj made his professional debut with Sochaux in a 1-1 Ligue 2 tie with Rodez AF on 19 September 2020.

On 7 January 2023, Faraj was loaned to Paris 13 Atletico in Championnat National.

On 2 January 2024, Faraj's contract with Sochaux was terminated by mutual consent.

== International career ==
Faraj was born in France to a Moroccan father and Algerian mother. He holds both French and Moroccan nationalities. He represented the Morocco U16s at the 2017 Montaigu Tournament.

In December 2020, Faraj announced in an interview that he had chosen to play for Algeria. A few days later, Faraj was called up by the Algeria under-20 national team for the 2020 UNAF U-20 Tournament in Tunisia.

== Career statistics ==
=== Club ===
As of match played 31 October 2026

Appearances and goals by club, season and competition
Club	Season	League			National cup (Note: Includes Coupe de France, Bosnian Cup)		Total	
Club	Season	Division	Apps	Goals	Apps	Goals	Apps	Goals
Sochaux II	2019–20	Championnat National 3	4	0	—		4	0
Sochaux II	2020–21	Championnat National 3	5	2	—		5	2
Sochaux II	2021–22	Championnat National 3	14	6	—		14	6
Sochaux II	2022–23	Championnat National 3	3	4	—		3	4
Sochaux II	2023–24	Championnat National 3	1	0	—		1	0
Sochaux II	Total		27	12	—		27	12
Sochaux	2020–21	Ligue 2	1	0	—		1	0
Sochaux	2021–22	Ligue 2	6	0	2	1	8	1
Sochaux	2022–23	Ligue 2	1	0	1	0	2	0
Sochaux	2023–24	Championnat National	0	0	1	0	1	0
Sochaux	Total		8	0	4	1	12	1
Paris 13 Atletico (loan)	2022–23	Championnat National	7	1	—		7	1
Asteras Tripolis	2024–25	Super League Greece	1	0	—		1	0
Radnik Bijeljina	2025–26	Bosnian Premier League	19	1	5	0	24	1
Čelik Zenica	2026–27	Bosnian Premier League	9	1	1	0	10	1
Career total			71	15	10	1	81	16

== Personal life ==
Faraj is the younger brother of the French youth international footballer Imad Faraj.
