= Mehdi Jeannin =

French footballer (born 1991)

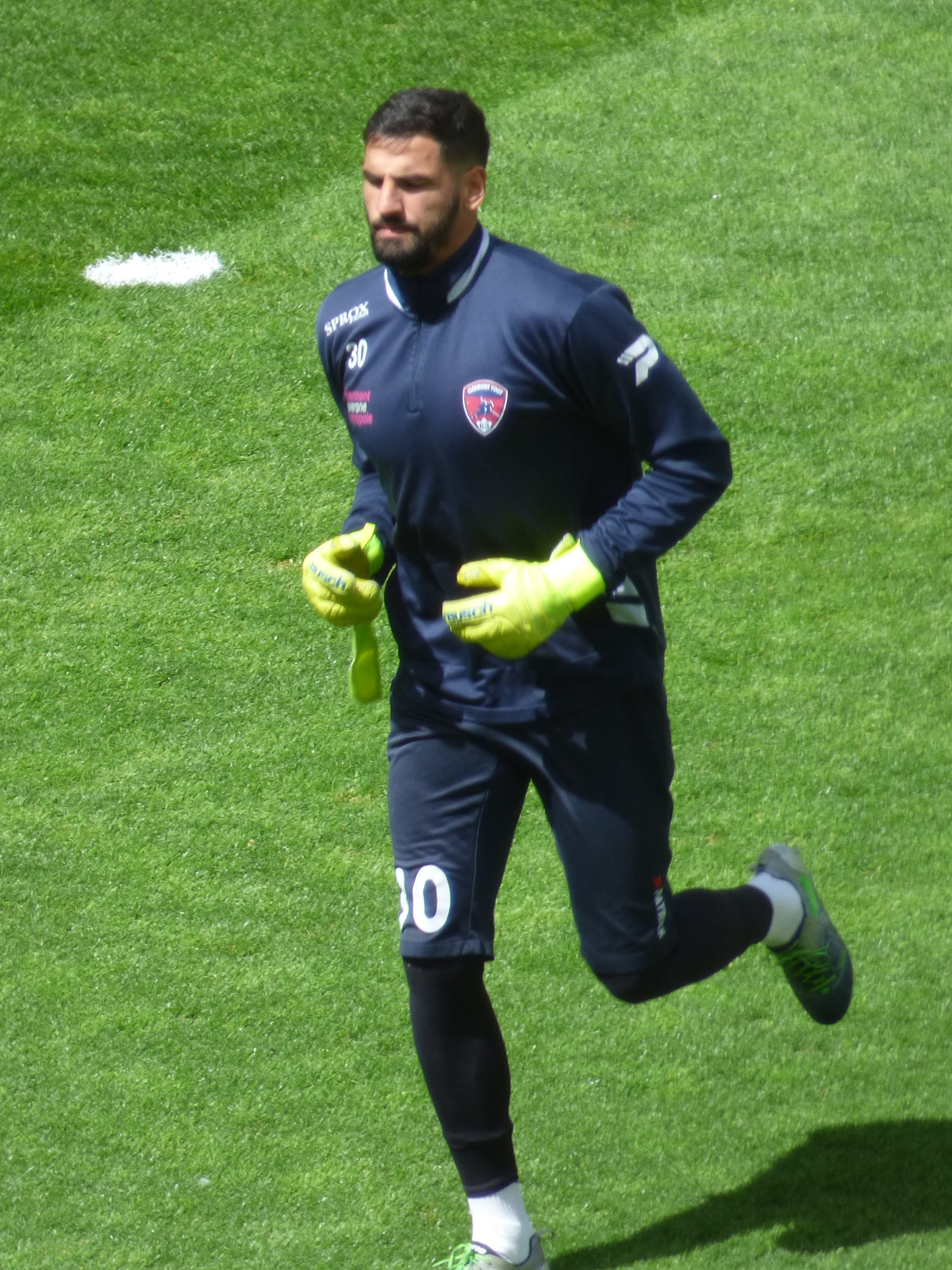

Personal information
- Date of birth: 20 April 1991 (age 35)
- Place of birth: Besançon, France
- Height: 1.87 m (6 ft 2 in)
- Position: Goalkeeper

Team information
- Current team: Sochaux
- Number: 1

Senior career*
Years	Team	Apps	(Gls)
2010–2011	Ornans	15	(0)
2012–2020	Clermont	94	(0)
2020–2023	Sochaux	13	(0)
2023–2025	Pau	8	(0)
2025–	Sochaux	7	(0)
- * Club domestic league appearances and goals as of 23 June 2026

Mehdi Jeannin (born 20 April 1991) is a French professional footballer who plays as a goalkeeper for Ligue 2 club Sochaux.

He has elected to represent Algeria at international level.

== Club career ==
After making his debut in the French lower divisions, Jeannin joined Clermont Foot in 2011, as a backup for Jessy Moulin and Fabien Farnolle. He made his full professional debut three years later in a 2–0 Ligue 2 defeat against Brest.

== International career ==
In September 2015, Jeannin was called up to the Algeria national team for the first time for a pair of friendlies against Guinea and Senegal.
