= Ibrahim Sissoko (footballer, born 1995) =

Footballer (born 1995)

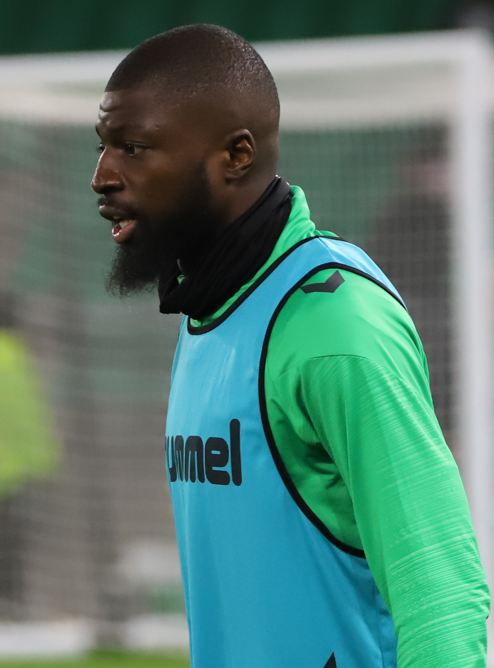
- Sissoko in 2024

Personal information
- Date of birth: 27 November 1995 (age 30)
- Place of birth: Créteil, France
- Height: 1.92 m (6 ft 4 in)
- Position: Forward

Team information
- Current team: Muğlaspor
- Number: 27

Youth career
- 2008–2014: Entente SSG

Senior career*
Years	Team	Apps	(Gls)
2014–2017	Entente SSG	35	(5)
2017	Épinal	14	(4)
2017–2018	Béziers	24	(8)
2018–2019	Lorient	4	(0)
2018–2019	Lorient B	1	(0)
2018	→ Béziers (loan)	13	(3)
2019–2022	Niort	49	(25)
2021	Niort B	1	(0)
2022–2023	Sochaux	35	(13)
2023–2025	Saint-Étienne	49	(15)
2025–2026	VfL Bochum	6	(1)
2026–	Muğlaspor	1	(0)

International career^{‡}
2023–	Mali	9	(1)
- * Club domestic league appearances and goals as of 1 September 2026 ‡ National team caps and goals as of 22 March 2025

Ibrahim Sissoko (born 27 November 1995) is a professional footballer who plays as a forward for TFF 1. Lig club Muğlaspor in Turkey. Born in France, he plays for the Mali national team.

== Club career ==
Sissoko joined Béziers in the 2017–18 season and was one of their key players in helping them get promoted into the Ligue 2. He signed with FC Lorient in the summer of 2018, and returned on loan to Béziers, where he made his professional debut in a 2–0 Ligue 2 win over AS Nancy on 27 July 2018. He returned to Lorient in December 2018. Sissoko left Niort at the end of the 2021–22 season, having scored 26 goals in 52 appearances for the club in all competitions.

On 30 June 2022, Sissoko signed a four-year contract with Sochaux.

On 6 July 2023, Sissoko joined Saint-Étienne on a three-year contract.

On 30 June 2025, Sissoko joined German club VfL Bochum.

== International career ==
Sissoko holds French and Malian nationalities. He was called up to the Mali national team for 2022 World Cup qualification matches in March 2022.

On 2 January 2024, he was selected from the list of 27 Malian players selected by Éric Chelle to compete in the 2023 Africa Cup of Nations.

== Career statistics ==
=== Club ===
As of match played 27 September 2025

Appearances and goals by club, season and competition
Club	Season	League			National cup		League cup		Total	
Club	Season	Division	Apps	Goals	Apps	Goals	Apps	Goals	Apps	Goals
Entente SSG	2013–14	CFA	6	3	0	0	—		6	3
Entente SSG	2014–15	CFA	8	0	0	0	—		8	0
Entente SSG	2015–16	CFA	12	2	1	0	—		13	2
Entente SSG	2016–17	CFA	9	0	2	0	—		11	0
Entente SSG	Total		35	5	3	0	—		38	5
Épinal	2016–17	National	14	4	0	0	—		14	4
Béziers	2017–18	National	24	8	0	0	—		24	8
Béziers (loan)	2018–19	Ligue 2	13	3	1	0	1	0	15	3
Lorient	2018–19	Ligue 2	4	0	0	0	0	0	4	0
Lorient B	2018–19	National 2	1	0	—		—		1	0
Niort	2019–20	Ligue 2	25	15	1	0	2	1	28	16
Niort	2020–21	Ligue 2	0	0	0	0	—		0	0
Niort	2021–22	Ligue 2	24	10	— (Note: Niort was excluded from the 2021–22 Coupe de France.)		—		24	10
Niort	Total		49	25	1	0	2	1	52	26
Niort B	2021–22	National 3	1	0	—		—		1	0
Sochaux	2022–23	Ligue 2	35	13	0	0	—		35	13
Saint-Étienne	2023–24	Ligue 2	29	12	0	0	3 (Note: One appearance in the Ligue 2 promotion play-offs, two appearances and one goal in the Ligue 1 relegation/promotion play-offs)	1	32	13
Saint-Étienne	2024–25	Ligue 1	20	3	1	0	—		21	3
Saint-Étienne	Total		49	15	1	0	3	1	53	16
VfL Bochum	2025–26	2. Bundesliga	5	1	0	0	—		5	1
Career total			230	74	6	0	6	2	242	76

=== International ===
As of matches played on 3 February 2024

Appearances and goals by national team and year
National team	Year	Apps	Goals
Mali	2023	2	1
Mali	2024	4	0
Total		6	1

Mali score listed first, score column indicates score after each Sissoko goal.

List of international goals scored by Ibrahim Sissoko
No.	Date	Venue	Opponent	Score	Result	Competition
1.	17 November 2023	Stade du 26 Mars, Bamako, Mali	Chad	3–1	3–1	2026 FIFA World Cup qualification
