= Aldo Kalulu =

DR Congolese footballer (born 1996)

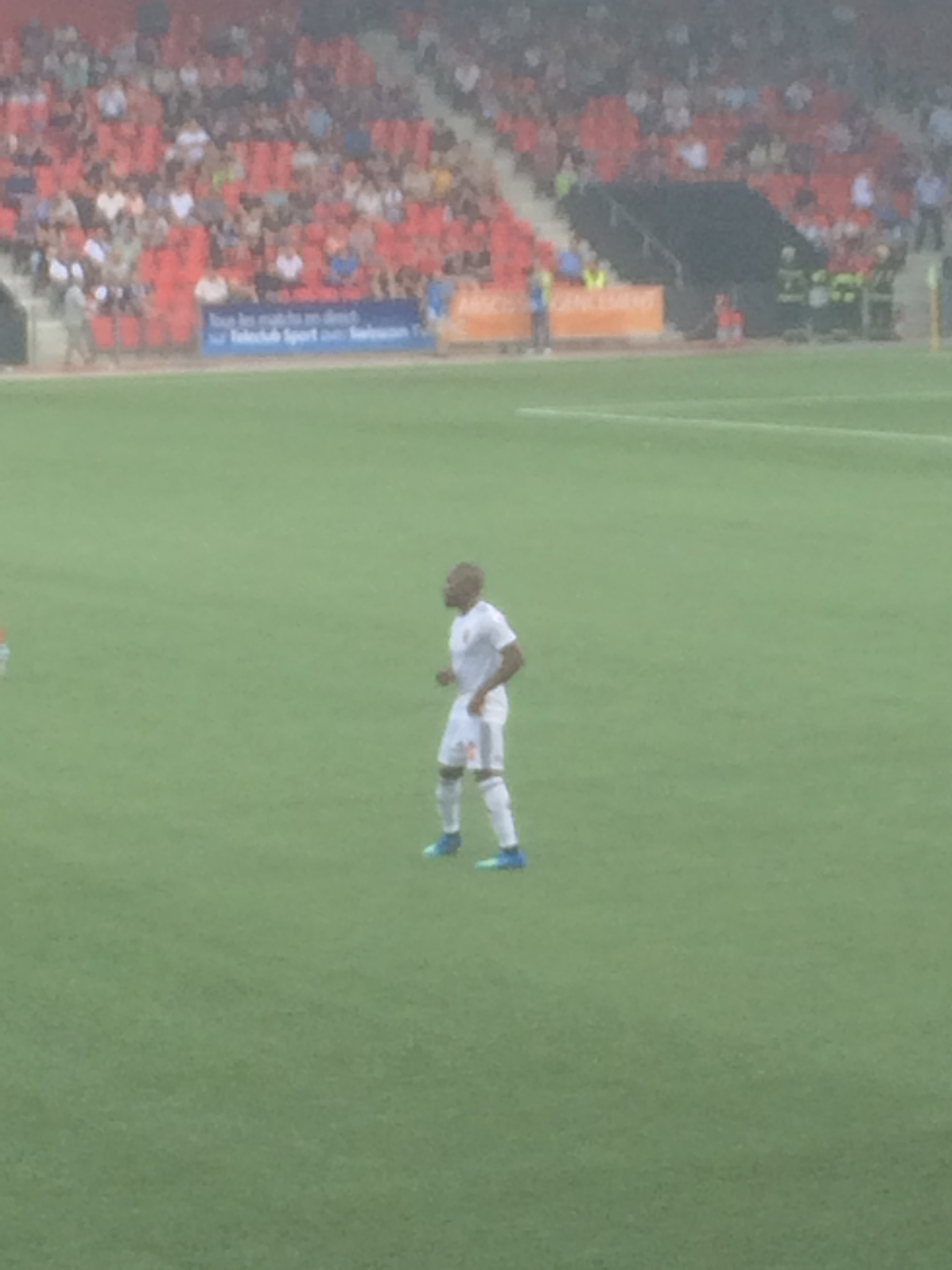
- Kalulu with Swansea City in 2019

Personal information
- Full name: Aldo-Nsawila Kalulu Kyatengwa
- Date of birth: 21 January 1996 (age 30)
- Place of birth: Lyon, France
- Height: 1.66 m (5 ft 5 in)
- Positions: Attacking midfielder; striker

Team information
- Current team: Nantong Zhiyun
- Number: 10

Youth career
- 2003–2004: CO St Fons
- 2004–2015: Lyon

Senior career*
Years	Team	Apps	(Gls)
2013–2016	Lyon B	38	(4)
2015–2018	Lyon	14	(3)
2017	→ Rennes (loan)	10	(0)
2017–2018	→ Sochaux (loan)	31	(11)
2018–2021	Basel	27	(0)
2019–2020	→ Swansea City (loan)	11	(0)
2021–2023	Sochaux	76	(15)
2023–2025	Partizan	70	(9)
2026–	Nantong Zhiyun	27	(6)

International career^{‡}
2023–	DR Congo	5	(0)
- * Club domestic league appearances and goals as of 7 November 2026 ‡ National team caps and goals as of 9 February 2024

Aldo-Nsawila Kalulu Kyatengwa (born 21 January 1996) is a professional footballer who plays as an attacking midfielder and striker who plays for China League One club Nantong Zhiyun. Born in France, he plays for the DR Congo national team.

== Early life ==
Kalulu was born in Lyon, France, and is Congolese by descent. His father was born in Kabimba, Belgian Congo, and his mother in Likasi, Congo-Léopoldville. He acquired French nationality on 26 December 2000 through the collective effect of his parents' naturalization.

== Club career ==
=== Lyon ===
Kalulu is a youth exponent from Lyon. He made his Ligue 1 debut on 12 September 2015 against Lille OSC replacing Jordan Ferri after 78 minutes in a 0–0 home draw.

He scored his first goal against Bastia on 23 September 2015, assisted by Steed Malbranque.

=== Basel ===
On 26 June 2018 FC Basel announced that they had signed Kalulu on a three-year deal until June 2021. Kalulu joined Basel's first team for their 2018–19 season under head coach Raphaël Wicky and later Marcel Koller. After playing in three test games Kalulu played his domestic league debut for the club in the home game in the St. Jakob-Park on 21 July 2018 as Basel were defeated 1–2 by St. Gallen. He scored his first goal for his new club on 18 August in the Swiss Cup away game as Basel won 3–0 against amateur club FC Montlingen.

Under trainer Marcel Koller Basel won the Swiss Cup in the 2018–19 season. In the first round Basel beat FC Montlingen 3–0, in the second round Echallens Région 7–2 and in the round of 16 Winterthur 1–0. In the quarter-finals Sion were defeated 4–2 after extra time and in the semi-finals Zürich were defeated 3–1. All these games were played away from home. The final was held on 19 May 2019 in the Stade de Suisse Wankdorf Bern against Thun. Striker Albian Ajeti scored the first goal, Fabian Frei the second for Basel, then Dejan Sorgić netted a goal for Thun, but the result remained 2–1 for Basel. Kalulu played in four cup games and scored that one game mentioned above.

In the first half of the season Kalulu played regularly, however, in the second half of the season he had just seven appearances and these as substitute. Therefore the club looked for a new solution.

Loan to Swansea City

On 5 August 2019, Kalulu signed for EFL Championship club Swansea City on a season-long loan with an option to buy at the end of the season.

Return to Basel

Swansea did not pull the option and so Kalulu returned to Basel for their 2020–21 season under new head coach Ciriaco Sforza. However, things did not improve for the striker, he made only 12 appearances and this as substitute. At the end of this season his contract expired and he left the club. Between the years 2018 and 2021 Kalulu played a total of 51 games for Basel scoring just three goals. 27 of these games were in the Nationalliga A, five in the Swiss Cup, four in the UEFA competitions (Champions League and Europa League) and 15 were friendly games. He scored one goal in the cup and the other two during the test games.

=== Sochaux ===
On 29 June 2021, he returned to Sochaux and signed a three-year contract.

=== Partizan ===
On 20 July 2023 it was announced that Kalulu signed a 3-year contract with FK Partizan. He made his debut on 29 July in the first round of the 2023–24 Serbian SuperLiga campaign against TSC, entering the game in the 54th minute and receiving a red card in the 95th minute. Kalulu scored his debut goal against Napredak which sent the team to the top of the Serbian SuperLiga after 18 months. Kalulu scored the opening goal in the match against Radnički Kragujevac with an assist from Matheus Saldanha. On 9 March 2024, Kalulu scored the second goal for Partizan in the 172nd Eternal derby, which ended 2–2.

On 26 October 2024, Kalulu scored his first SuperLiga goal of the 2024–25 season in a 3–1 win against Čukarički.

== International career ==
Kalulu is a former youth international for France at U18 level. He debuted for the DR Congo national team in a 3–1 2023 Africa Cup of Nations qualification win over Mauritania on 24 March 2023.

== Personal life ==
Kalulu is the older brother of footballers Gédéon Kalulu, Pierre Kalulu and Joseph Kalulu.

== Career statistics ==
As of match played 7 November 2026

Appearances and goals by club, season and competition
Club	Season	League			Cup		League Cup		Continental (Note: Includes UEFA Champions League)		Other (Note: Includes Trophée des Champions)		Total	
Club	Season	Division	Apps	Goals	Apps	Goals	Apps	Goals	Apps	Goals	Apps	Goals	Apps	Goals
Lyon	2015–16	Ligue 1	10	2	2	0	0	0	2	0	0	0	14	2
Lyon	2016–17	Ligue 1	4	1	0	0	0	0	2	0	0	0	6	1
Lyon	Total		14	3	2	0	0	0	4	0	0	0	20	3
Rennes (loan)	2016–17	Ligue 1	10	0	1	0	0	0	—		—		11	0
Sochaux (loan)	2017–18	Ligue 2	31	11	2	1	1	0	—		—		34	12
Basel	2018–19	Swiss Super League	17	0	4	1	—		3	0	—		24	1
Basel	2020–21	Swiss Super League	10	0	1	0	—		1	0	—		12	0
Basel	Total		27	0	5	1	—		4	0	—		36	1
Swansea City (loan)	2019–20	Championship	11	0	0	0	0	0	—		—		11	0
Sochaux	2021–22	Ligue 2	39	9	0	0	—		—		—		39	9
Sochaux	2022–23	Ligue 2	37	6	1	0	—		—		—		38	6
Sochaux	Total		76	15	1	0	—		—		—		77	15
Partizan	2023–24	Serbian SuperLiga	34	3	3	0	—		4	0	—		41	3
Partizan	2024–25	Serbian SuperLiga	34	6	2	0	—		5	0	—		41	6
Partizan	2025–26	Serbian SuperLiga	2	0	0	0	—		4	0	—		6	0
Partizan	Total		70	9	5	0	—		13	0	—		88	9
Nantong Zhiyun	2026	China League One	27	6	0	0	—		—		—		27	6
Career total			266	44	16	2	1	0	21	0	0	0	304	46

== Honours ==
Basel

- Swiss Cup: 2018–19
