= Malcolm Viltard =

French footballer (born 2002)

Personal information
- Date of birth: 24 October 2002 (age 24)
- Place of birth: Carcassonne, France
- Height: 1.75 m (5 ft 9 in)
- Position: Midfielder

Team information
- Current team: Dender
- Number: 24

Youth career
- 2008–2016: ES du Fresquel
- 2016–2017: Castelnaudary
- 2017–2018: Muret
- 2018–2019: Balma

Senior career*
Years	Team	Apps	(Gls)
2019–2022	Sochaux II	26	(5)
2020–2024	Sochaux	34	(3)
2022–2023	→ Châteauroux (loan)	27	(1)
2024–	Dender	67	(1)
- * Club domestic league appearances and goals as of 11 May 2026

Malcolm Viltard (born 24 October 2002) is a French professional footballer who plays as a midfielder for Belgian club Dender.

== Career ==
Viltard is a youth product of ES du Fresquel, Castelnaudary, Muret, and Balma, before signing with Sochaux in January 2019. Viltard made his professional debut with Sochaux in a 4-0 Ligue 2 win over Le Havre AC on 28 November 2020.

On 7 September 2022, Viltard extended his contract with Sochaux to 2025 and was loaned to Châteauroux for the 2022–23 season.
