= Maxime Do Couto =

French footballer (born 1996)

Personal information
- Full name: Maxime José Samuel do Couto Teixeira
- Date of birth: 13 December 1996 (age 29)
- Place of birth: Neuilly-sur-Seine, France
- Height: 1.73 m (5 ft 8 in)
- Position: Winger

Team information
- Current team: Dinamo Tbilisi
- Number: 14

Youth career
- 2003–2006: Paris 15ème O.
- 2006–2011: Mantes
- 2011–2014: Tours

Senior career*
Years	Team	Apps	(Gls)
2014–2017	Tours B	62	(16)
2014–2017	Tours	17	(0)
2017–2018	Avoine OCC	20	(10)
2018–2021	Olimpik Donetsk	74	(8)
2021–2023	Sochaux	57	(6)
2023–2024	Amiens	23	(1)
2024-25	IMT	7	(1)
2025–2026	Krasava ENY Ypsonas	31	(4)
2026–	Dinamo Tbilisi	14	(4)

International career
2014	France U19	3	(1)
- * Club domestic league appearances and goals as of 15 November 2026

Maxime José Samuel do Couto Teixeira (born 13 December 1996) is a French professional footballer who plays as a winger for Georgian club Dinamo Tbilisi.

== Club career ==
Do Couto is a youth exponent from Tours. He made his Ligue 2 debut on 30 August 2014 against Angers SCO in a 1–2 away win. He had a brief stint at Avoine OCC before moving to Ukraine with Olimpik Donetsk from 2018 to 2021. On 22 June 2021, he transferred back to France with Sochaux in the Ligue 2. On 4 September 2023, French Ligue 2 club Amiens SC announced his signing.

On 5 June 2026, Erovnuli Liga club Dinamo Tbilisi announced the signing of Do Couto from Krasava ENY Ypsonas, to a two-year contract.

== International career ==
Born in France, Do Couto is of Cameroonian and Portuguese descent. He holds French and Portuguese nationalities. He is a youth international for France, having represented the France U19s in 2014.

== Personal life ==
His sister, Lisa Do Couto Teixeira, is an actress. He is the older brother of Sacha Boey of Bayern Munich.
