= Gaétan Weissbeck =

French footballer (born 1997)

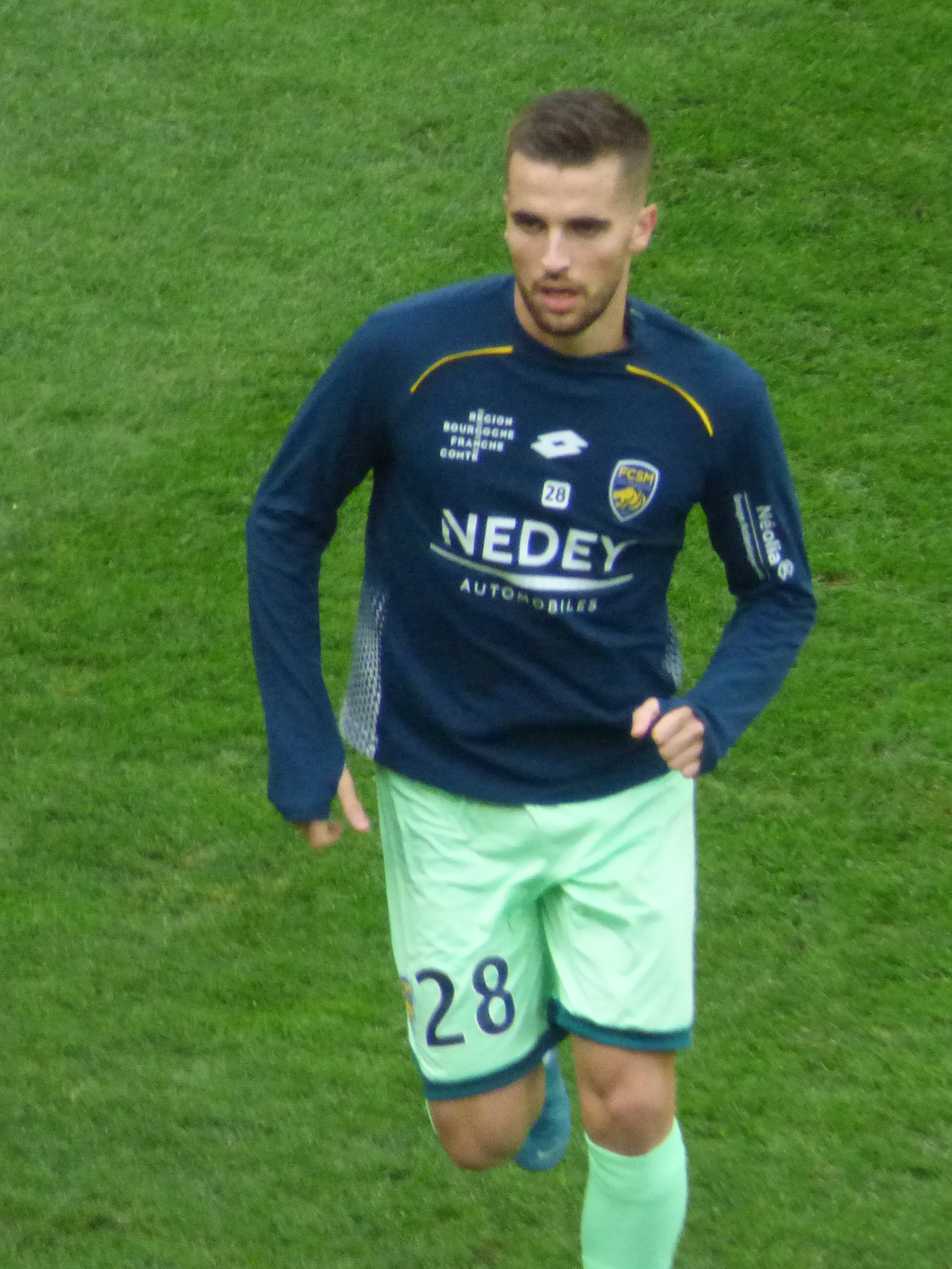
- Weissbeck with Sochaux in 2019

Personal information
- Full name: Gaétan Weissbeck
- Date of birth: 17 January 1997 (age 29)
- Place of birth: Wissembourg, France
- Height: 1.77 m (5 ft 10 in)
- Position: Midfielder

Team information
- Current team: Apollon Limassol
- Number: 27

Youth career
- 2011–2015: Strasbourg

Senior career*
Years	Team	Apps	(Gls)
2015–2017	Strasbourg B	41	(5)
2017–2019	Haguenau	55	(28)
2019–2024	Sochaux	127	(24)
2023–2024	→ Bordeaux (loan)	33	(4)
2024–	Apollon Limassol	52	(7)
- * Club domestic league appearances and goals as of 9 February 2026

Gaétan Weissbeck (born 17 January 1997) is a French professional footballer who plays as a midfielder for Cypriot First Division club Apollon Limassol.

== Club career ==
On 31 January 2019, Weissbeck signed his first professional contract with Sochaux for three years. He made his professional debut for Sochaux in a 0–0 Ligue 2 tie with Caen on 26 July 2019.

On 13 August 2024, Weissbeck signed for Cypriot club Apollon Limassol.

== Career statistics ==
As of match played 8 March 2025

Appearances and goals by club, season and competition
Club	Season	League			National cup (Note: Includes Coupe de France, Cypriot Cup)		League cup (Note: Includes Coupe de la Ligue)		Other		Total	
Club	Season	Division	Apps	Goals	Apps	Goals	Apps	Goals	Apps	Goals	Apps	Goals
Strasbourg	2015-16	Championnat National	0	0	0	0	—		—		0	0
Strasbourg	2016-17	Ligue 2	0	0	1	0	0	0	—		1	0
Strasbourg	Total		0	0	1	0	0	0	—		1	0
Strasbourg B	2015-16	CFA 2	20	3	—		—		—		20	3
Strasbourg B	2016-17	CFA 2	21	2	—		—		—		21	2
Strasbourg B	Total		41	5	—		—		—		41	5
Haguenau	2017-18	Championnat National 3	27	17	2	0	—		—		29	17
Haguenau	2018-19	Championnat National 2	28	11	1	1	—		—		29	12
Haguenau	Total		55	28	3	1	—		—		58	29
Sochaux	2019-20	Ligue 2	24	2	1	0	0	0	—		25	2
Sochaux	2020-21	Ligue 2	36	10	1	0	—		—		37	10
Sochaux	2021-22	Ligue 2	35	6	0	0	—		2 (Note: Appearance(s) in Ligue 2 Promotion play-offs)	0	37	6
Sochaux	2022-23	Ligue 2	32	5	0	0	—		—		32	5
Sochaux	2023-24	Championnat National	0	0	0	0	—		—		0	0
Sochaux	Total		127	23	2	0	0	0	2	0	131	23
Bordeaux (loan)	2023-24	Ligue 2	33	4	3	1	—		—		36	5
Apollon Limassol	2024-25	Cypriot First Division	23	2	2	2	—		—		25	4
Career total			279	62	11	4	0	0	2	0	292	66
