= Tony Mauricio =

French footballer (born 1994)

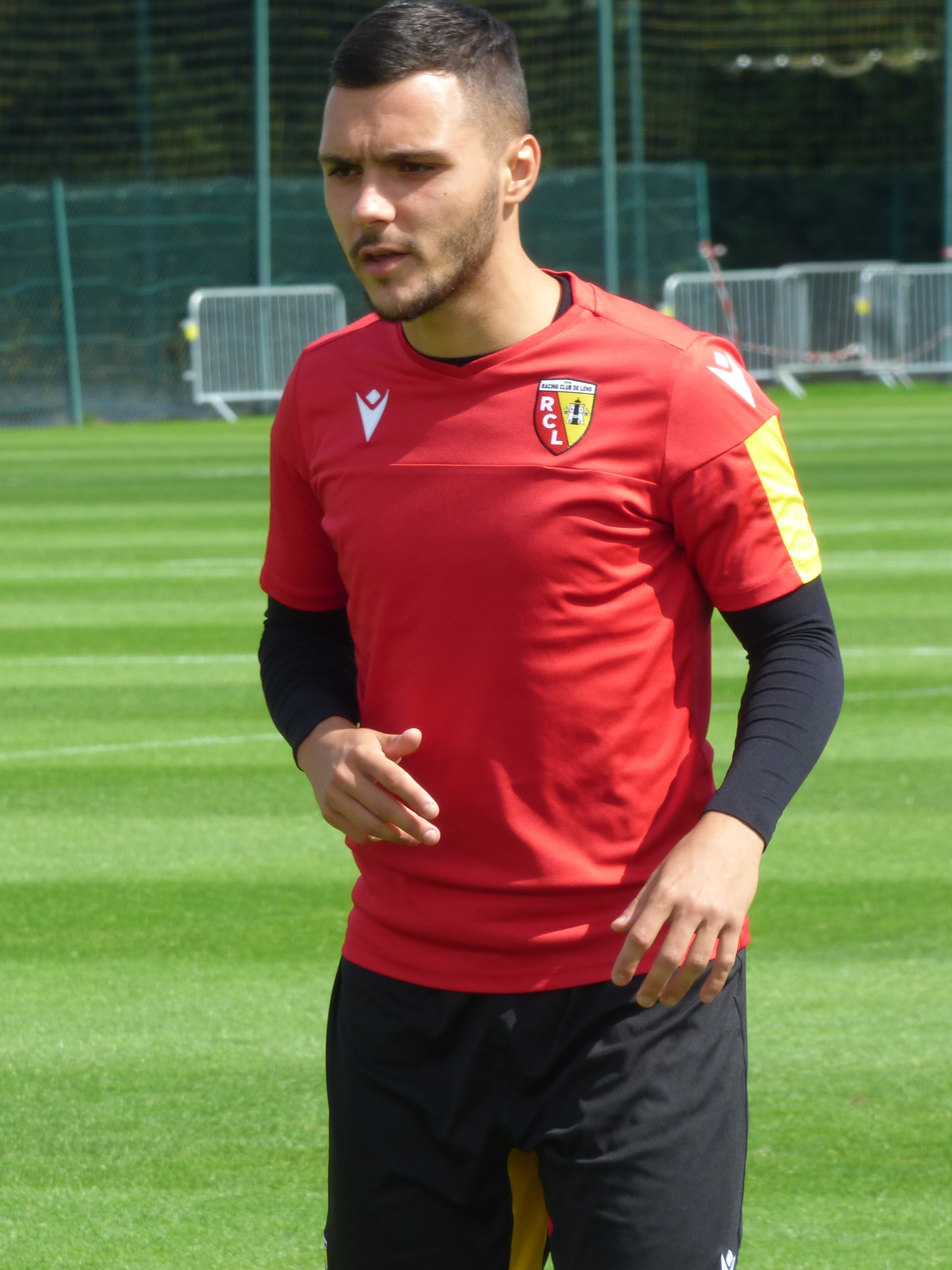
- Mauricio with Lens in 2020

Personal information
- Date of birth: 20 March 1994 (age 32)
- Place of birth: Limoges, France
- Height: 1.69 m (5 ft 7 in)
- Position: Winger

Senior career*
Years	Team	Apps	(Gls)
2012–2013	Limoges	26	(5)
2013–2015	Châteauroux	6	(1)
2015–2017	Boulogne	54	(10)
2017–2019	Valenciennes	71	(13)
2019–2021	Lens	53	(4)
2021–2023	Sochaux	69	(12)
Total		279	(45)
- * Club domestic league appearances and goals

Tony Mauricio (born 22 March 1994) is a French former professional footballer who played as a winger. He started his career with his hometown club Limoges, and has also represented Châteauroux, where he played six games in Ligue 2.

== Personal life ==
Mauricio was born in France and is of Portuguese descent. He holds dual nationality.

== Career statistics ==
As of 4 December 2018

Appearances and goals by club, season and competition
Club	Season	League			Cup		League Cup		Total	
Club	Season	Division	Apps	Goals	Apps	Goals	Apps	Goals	Apps	Goals
Limoges	2012–13	CFA2 Group G	26	5	1	0	0	0	27	5
Châteauroux	2014–15	Ligue 2	6	1	2	0	0	0	8	1
Boulogne	2015–16	National	25	2	2	0	0	0	27	2
Boulogne	2016–17	National	29	8	0	0	0	0	29	8
Boulogne	Total		54	10	2	0	0	0	56	10
Valenciennes	2017–18	Ligue 2	34	6	3	1	2	1	39	8
Valenciennes	2018–19	Ligue 2	17	6	1	1	1	0	19	7
Valenciennes	Total		51	12	4	2	3	1	58	15
Career total			137	28	9	2	3	1	149	31
