= Abdallah Ndour =

Senegalese footballer (born 1993)

Personal information
- Date of birth: 20 December 1993 (age 32)
- Place of birth: Rufisque, Senegal
- Height: 1.80 m (5 ft 11 in)
- Position: Left-back

Youth career
- Génération Foot

Senior career*
| Years | Team | Apps | (Gls) |
| 2011–2014 | Metz B | 45 | (2) |
| 2011–2014 | Metz | 0 | (0) |
| 2014–2020 | Strasbourg | 104 | (3) |
| 2018–2020 | Strasbourg B | 11 | (1) |
| 2020–2023 | Sochaux | 89 | (2) |
| 2023–2025 | Guingamp | 9 | (0) |

International career^{‡}
| 2023– | Senegal | 1 | (0) |
- * Club domestic league appearances and goals as of 14 March 2025 ‡ National team caps and goals as of 19 August 2023

Abdallah Ndour (born 20 December 1993) is a Senegalese professional footballer who plays as a left-back.

== Career ==
In June 2020, Ndour signed for FC Sochaux-Montbéliard on a three-year contract, joining from Strasbourg.

On 27 July 2023, Guingamp announced the signing of Ndour from Sochaux on a three-year deal.

== International career ==
Ndour debuted with the senior Senegal national team in a 5–1 2023 Africa Cup of Nations qualification win over Mozambique on 24 March 2023, assisting his side's third goal.
