= Stade Auguste-Bonal =

Stadium in Montbéliard, France

Coordinates: 47°30′45″N 6°48′40″E

- Bonal
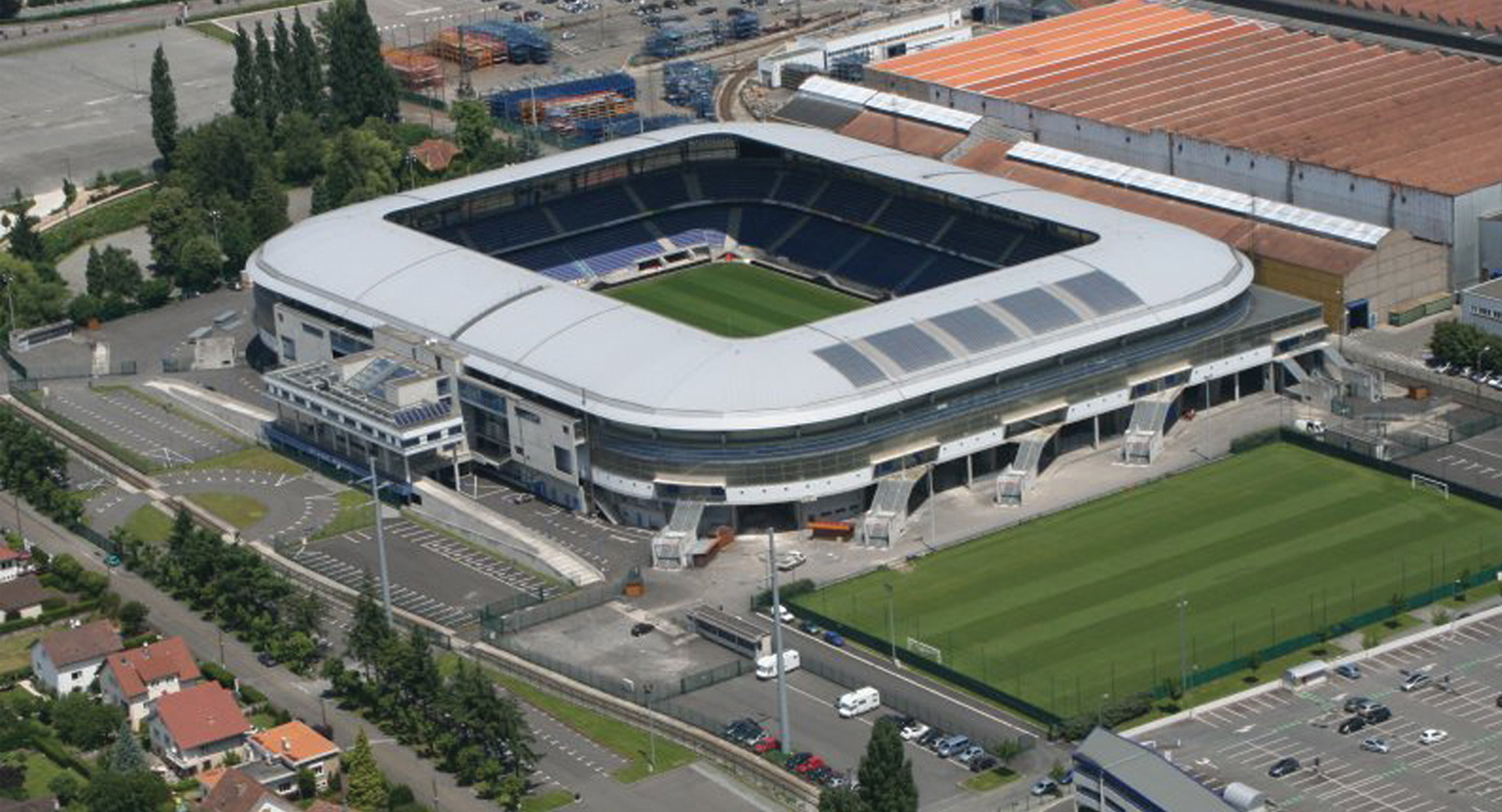
- Interactive map of Stade Auguste-Bonal
- Full name: Stade Auguste-Bonal
- Location: Impasse de la Forge; 25200 Montbéliard
- Capacity: 20,025
- Surface: Grass

Construction
- Built: 13 December 1930
- Opened: 11 November 1931
- Renovated: 1973, 1998–2000
- Expanded: 1935
- Cost: 50.000.500

Tenant
- FC Sochaux-Montbéliard (1931–present) Peugeot (1992–1998, 2000–present)

Stade Auguste Bonal (French pronunciation: [stad‿ogyst bɔnal]) is a multi-purpose stadium in Montbéliard, France. It is used mostly for football matches. It is the home ground of FC Sochaux-Montbéliard. The stadium is able to hold 20,025 people. Constructed in 1931, it has undergone several renovations, most recently in 2000.

== Gallery ==
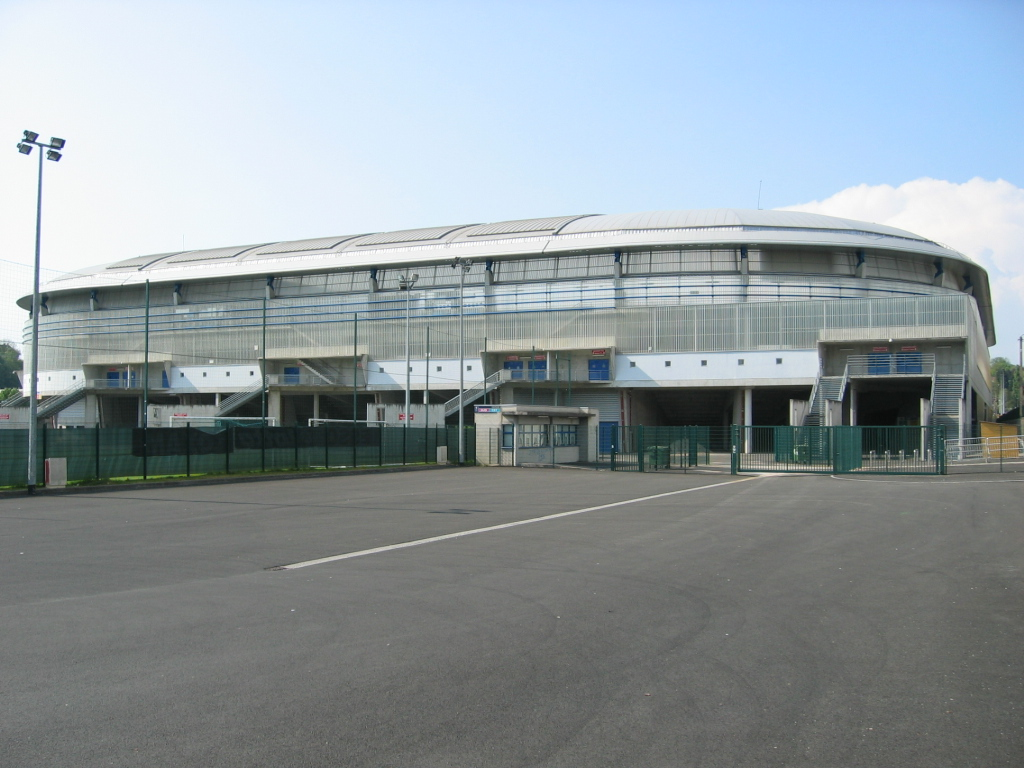
Exterior view of the stadium

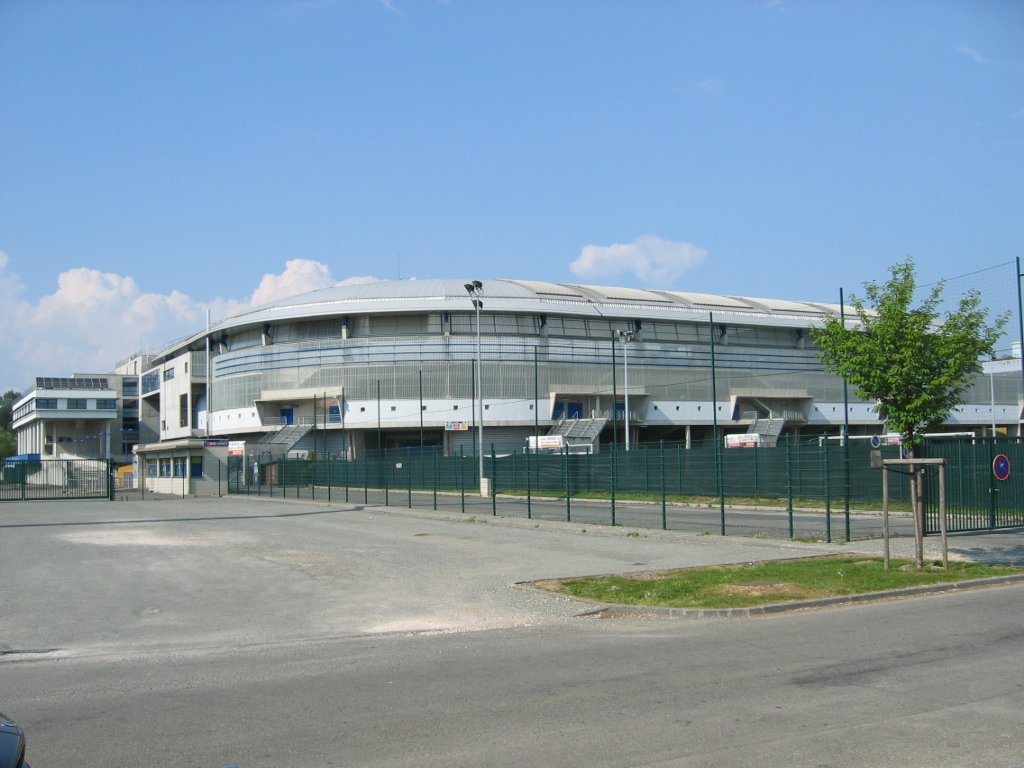
Exterior view of the stadium

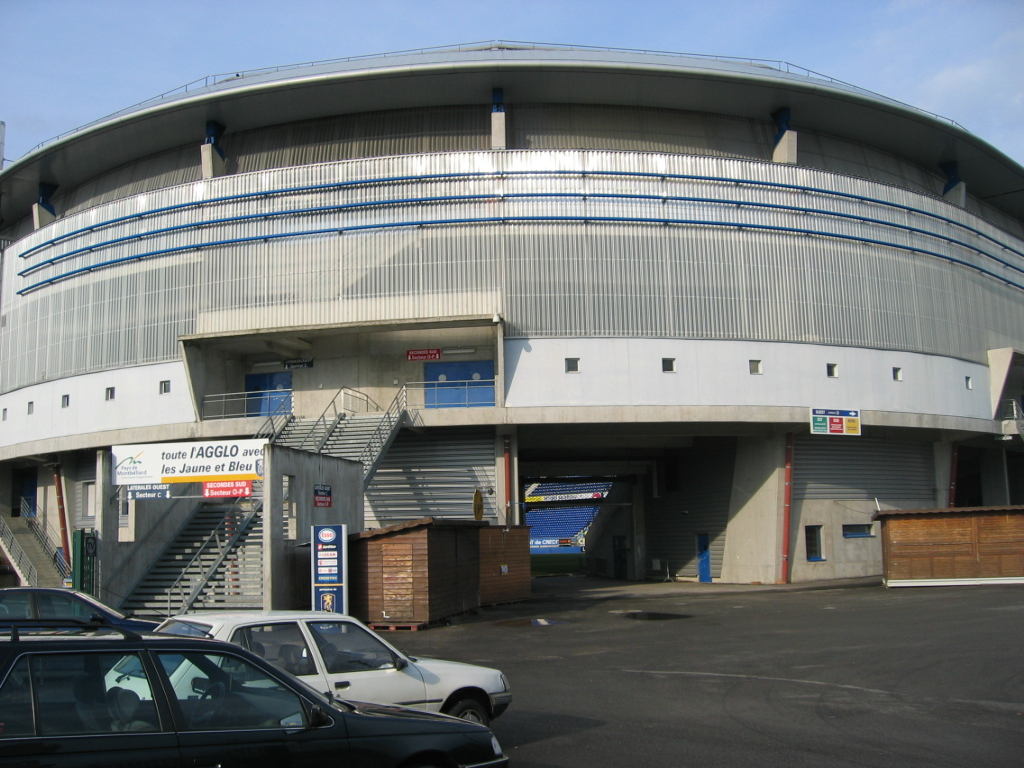
Exterior view of the stadium

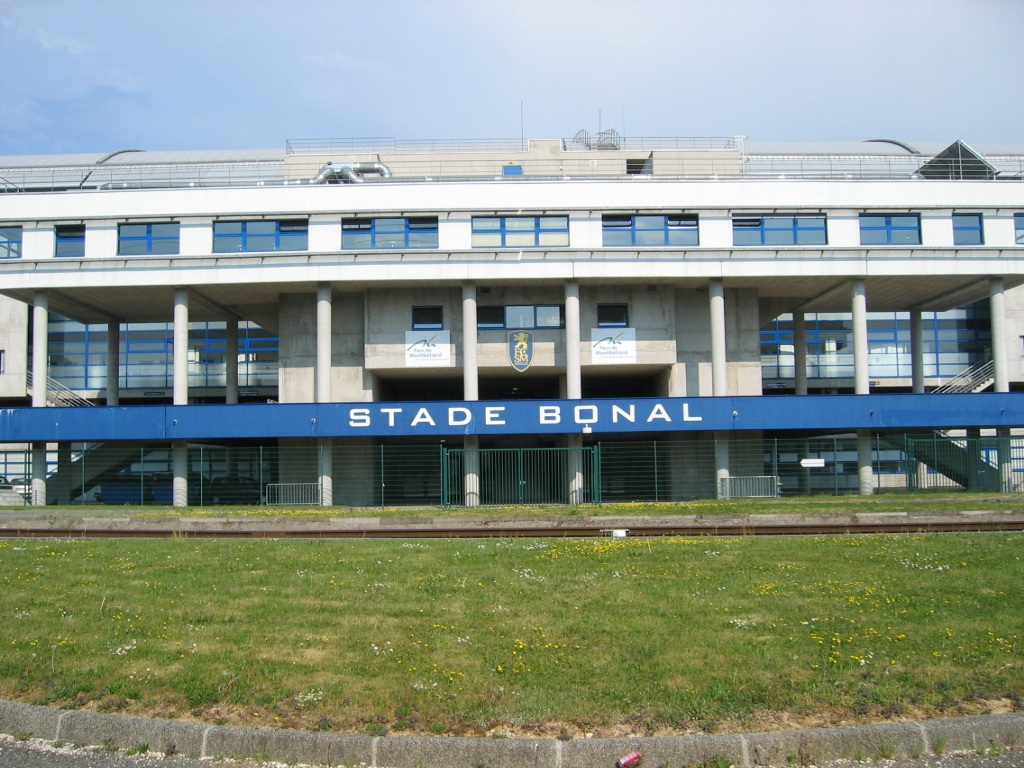
Stadium entry

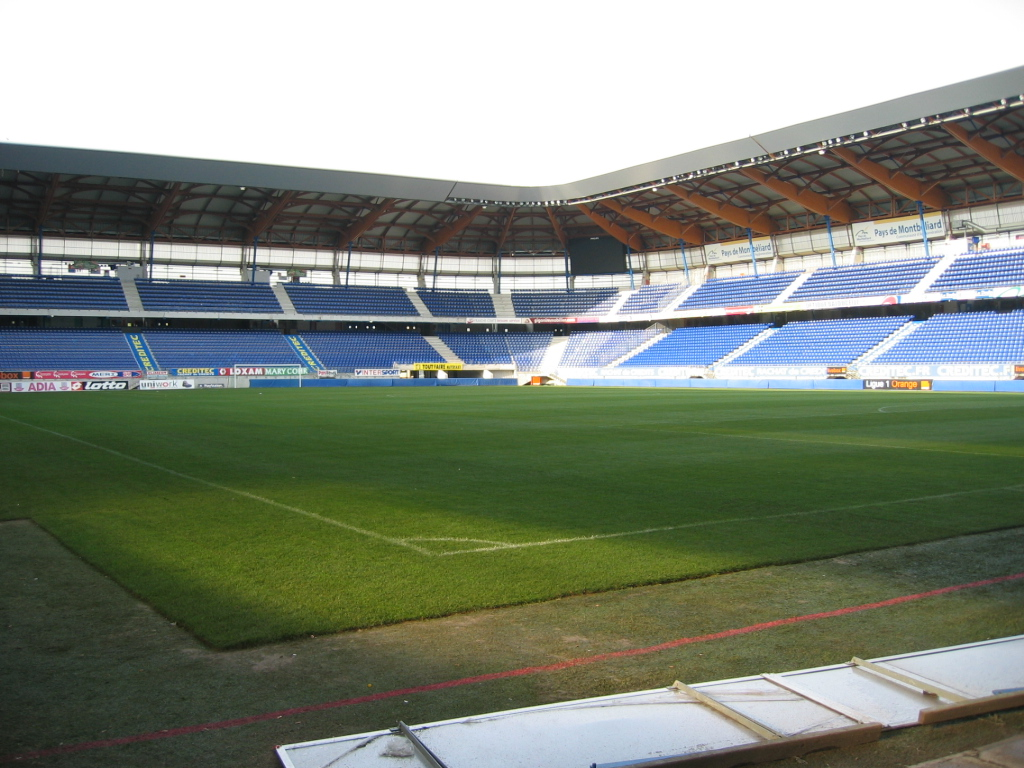
Stadium panorama

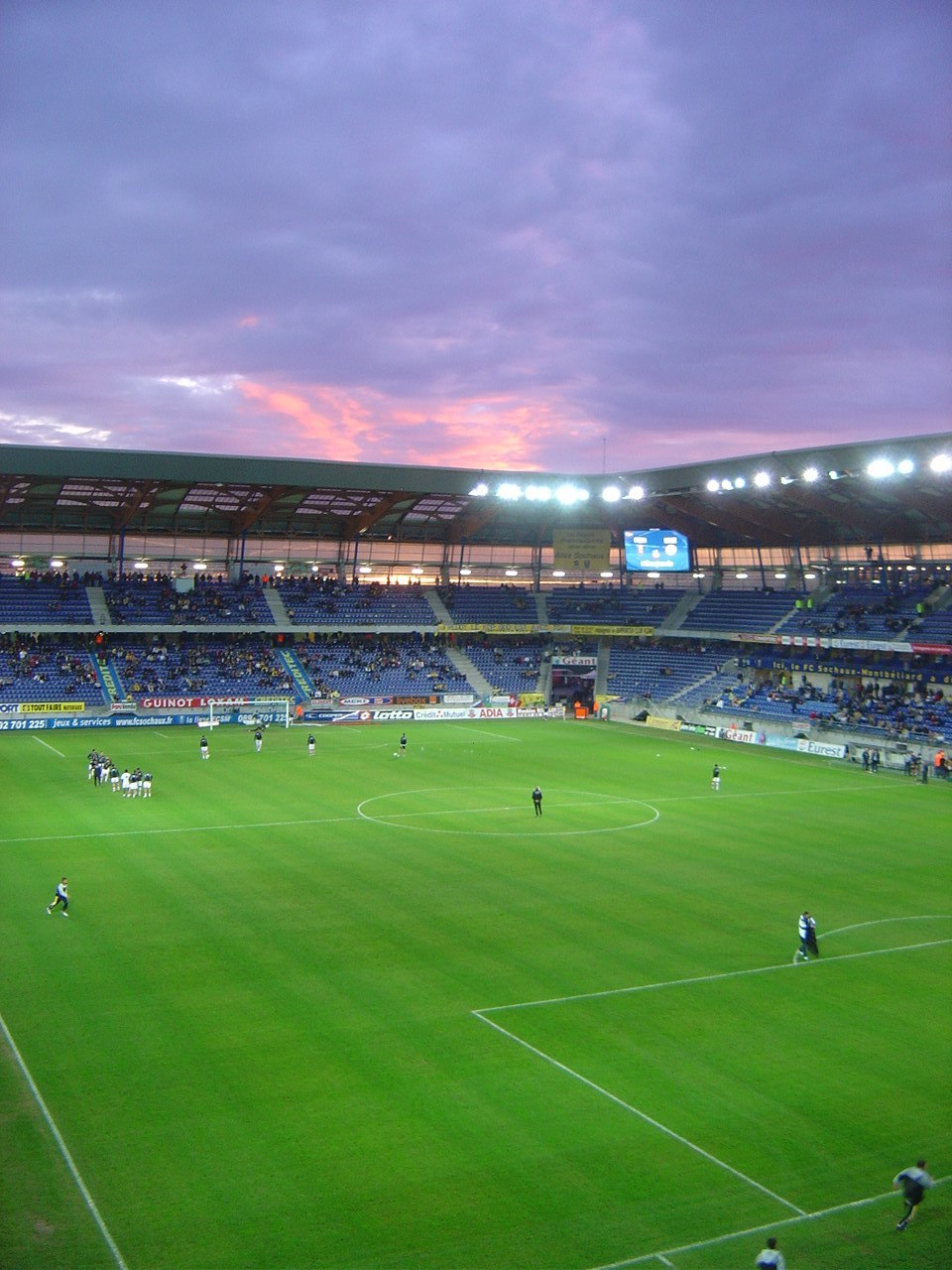
Stadium panorama

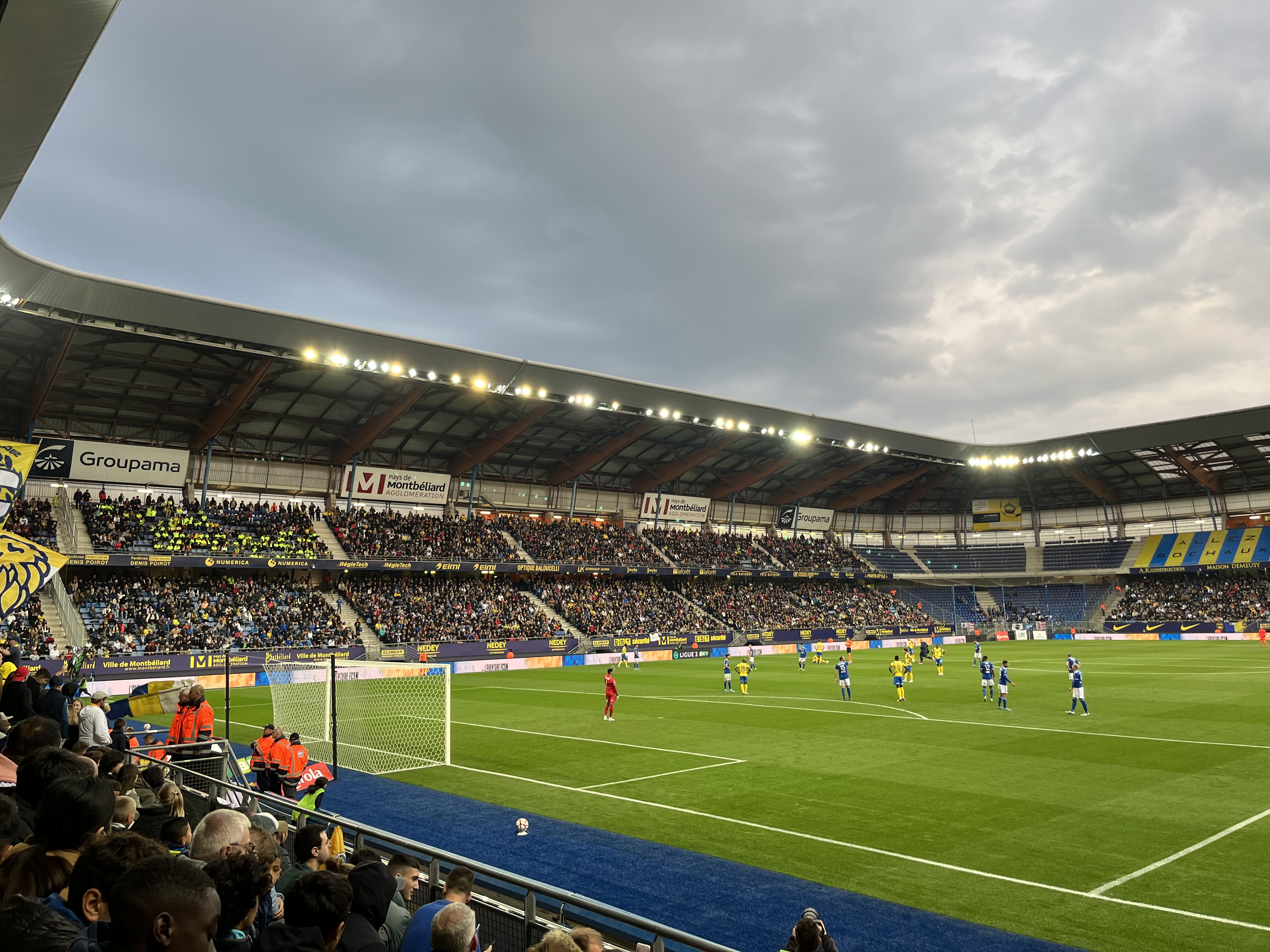
FC Sochaux - SC Bastia 2:1, Stade Auguste-Bonal, 30.04.2022 (Ligue 2 2021/22)

== See also ==
- List of football stadiums in France
- Lists of stadiums
