= Hermann Tebily =

French footballer (born 2002)

Personal information
- Date of birth: 24 January 2002 (age 24)
- Place of birth: Paris, France
- Height: 1.83 m (6 ft 0 in)
- Position: Forward

Team information
- Current team: Rodez
- Number: 19

Youth career
- 2007–2018: Sarcelles
- 2015–2020: Lyon

Senior career*
Years	Team	Apps	(Gls)
2020–2023	Sochaux II	15	(2)
2021–2023	Sochaux	32	(0)
2023–2025	Thun	6	(1)
2025–	Rodez	5	(0)
- * Club domestic league appearances and goals as of 11 May 2026

Hermann Tebily (born 24 January 2002) is a French professional footballer who plays as a forward for Ligue 2 club Rodez.

== Career ==
A youth product of Lyon, Tebily signed with Sochaux in the summer of 2020. He made his professional debut with Sochaux in a 1–1 Ligue 2 tie with Pau FC on 17 April 2021.

On 30 July 2025, Tebily signed with Rodez in Ligue 2.

== Personal life ==
Born in France, Tebily is of Ivorian descent.
