= 2021–22 AS Nancy Lorraine season =

AS Nancy
2021–22 season
- Owner: Chien Lee
- Chairman: Gauthier Ganaye
- Manager: Daniel Stendel (until 25 September); Benoît Pedretti (caretaker, 25 September to 3 January); Albert Cartier (from 3 January)
- Stadium: Stade Marcel Picot
- Ligue 2: 20th (relegated)
- Coupe de France: Round of 16
Home colours	Away colours

The 2021–22 season was the 112th season in the existence of AS Nancy Lorraine and the club's fifth consecutive season in the second division of French football. In addition to the domestic league, Nancy participated in this season's edition of the Coupe de France.

== Players ==
=== First-team squad ===
As of 1 February 2022.

Note: Flags indicate national team as defined under FIFA eligibility rules; some limited exceptions apply. Players may hold more than one non-FIFA nationality.

No.	Pos.	Nation	Player
1	GK	FRA	Baptiste Valette
2	DF	GBS	Soares
3	DF	MAR	Abdelhamid El Kaoutari
4	DF	FRA	Thomas Basila (on loan from Oostende)
5	MF	FRA	Giovanni Haag
6	MF	FRA	Grégoire Lefebvre
7	FW	MTQ	Mickaël Biron (on loan from Oostende)
8	MF	FRA	Warren Bondo
9	FW	FRA	Andrew Jung (on loan from Oostende)
10	FW	SEN	Mamadou Thiam (on loan from Oostende)
11	DF	FRA	Rosario Latouchent
12	MF	FRA	Neil El Aynaoui
13	FW	MAD	Dorian Bertrand
14	MF	FRA	Antonin Bobichon (on loan from Angers)

No.	Pos.	Nation	Player
15	MF	CPV	Kelvin Patrick
16	GK	ENG	Nathan Trott (on loan from West Ham United)
17	FW	ANG	Elliot Simões
18	DF	MTN	Souleymane Karamoko
19	DF	FRA	William Bianda (on loan from Roma)
20	DF	MAD	Thomas Fontaine
21	FW	CMR	Vinni Triboulet
22	DF	FRA	Shaquil Delos
23	DF	SEN	Saliou Ciss
24	MF	CIV	Edmond Akichi
27	FW	COD	Yeni Ngbakoto
28	MF	BEL	Sieben Dewaele (on loan from Oostende)
29	FW	FRA	Lamine Cissé
30	GK	FRA	Hugo Constant

== Pre-season and friendlies ==
Win Draw Loss

9 July 2021 Friendly	Dijon (France)	1–2	(France) Nancy	Dijon, France
18:30 CEST (UTC+2)				Stadium: Stade Gaston Gérard

13 July 2021 Friendly	Metz (France)	3–2	(France) Nancy	Metz, France
17:00 CEST (UTC+2)				Stadium: Centre d’entraînement Frescaty

== Competitions ==
=== Overall record ===
Competition	First match	Last match	Starting round	Final position	Record							
Competition	First match	Last match	Starting round	Final position	Pld	W	D	L	GF	GA	GD	Win %
Ligue 2	24 July 2021	14 May 2022	Matchday 1	20th	38	6	9	23	32	69	−37	15.79
Coupe de France	14 November 2021	29 January 2022	Seventh round	Round of 16	5	2	2	1	6	5	+1	40.00
Total					43	8	11	24	38	74	−36	18.60

Source: Soccerway

=== Ligue 2 ===
==== League table ====
Pos	Team	Pld	W	D	L	GF	GA	GD	Pts	Promotion or Relegation
16	Valenciennes	38	10	14	14	34	47	−13	44	
17	Rodez	38	10	13	15	32	42	−10	43	
18	Quevilly-Rouen (O)	38	10	10	18	33	50	−17	40	Qualification for the relegation play-offs
19	Dunkerque (R)	38	8	7	23	28	53	−25	31	Relegation to Championnat National
20	Nancy (R)	38	6	9	23	32	69	−37	27	Relegation to Championnat National

Source: Ligue 2
Rules for classification: 1) Points; 2) Goal difference; 3) Number of goals scored; 4) Head-to-head goal difference; 5) Fair play points
(O) Play-off winners; (R) Relegated

==== Results summary ====
Overall								Home						Away					
Pld	W	D	L	GF	GA	GD	Pts	W	D	L	GF	GA	GD	W	D	L	GF	GA	GD
38	6	9	23	32	69	−37	27	4	4	11	16	33	−17	2	5	12	16	36	−20

Source: Ligue 2

==== Results by round ====
Round	1	2	3	4	5	6	7	8	9	10	11	12	13	14	15	16	17	18	19	20	21	22	23	24	25	26	27	28	29	30	31	32	33	34	35	36	37	38
Ground	A	H	A	H	A	H	A	H	A	H	A	H	A	H	A	H	A	A	H	A	H	A	H	A	H	A	H	A	H	A	H	A	H	A	H	H	A	H
Result	L	L	D	L	L	L	D	D	L	D	D	W	L	D	W	L	L	L	L	L	W	L	D	D	W	L	L	L	W	L	L	L	L	D	L	L	W	L
Position	16	19	18	19	20	20	20	20	20	20	20	20	20	20	20	20	20	20	20	20	20	20	20	20	20	20	20	20	20	20	20	20	20	20	20	20	20	20

Source: Ligue 2
A = Away; H = Home; W = Win; D = Draw; L = Loss

==== Matches ====
The league fixtures were announced on 25 June 2021.

24 July 2021 1	Pau	2–1	Nancy	Pau
19:00 CEST (UTC+2)	Assifuah 34'; Dembélé (yellow card) 37'; Daubin (yellow card) 87'; Lobry 90+3'	Report	Haag (yellow card) 14' (yellow-red card) 40'; Thiam 55'; Lefebvre (yellow card) 88'	Stadium: Stade du Hameau; Referee: Marc Bollengier

31 July 2021 2	Nancy	0–4	Toulouse	Tomblaine
19:00 CEST (UTC+2)		Report	Evitt-Healey 1', 70'; Gabrielsen 27'; Rouault 41'; Sylla (yellow card) 43'; Dejaegere (yellow card) 54'	Stadium: Stade Marcel Picot; Referee: Alexandre Perreau Niel

11 August 2021 3	Bastia	1–1	Nancy	Furiani
19:00 CEST (UTC+2)	Saadi 12'; Sainati (yellow card) 63'; Schur (yellow card) 80'	Report	Delos (yellow card) 19'; Sainati 76' (o.g.)	Stadium: Stade Armand Cesari; Referee: Pierre Gaillouste

14 August 2021 4	Nancy	0–1	Valenciennes	Tomblaine
19:00 CEST (UTC+2)	El Kaoutari (yellow card) 4'; Haag (yellow card) 11' (yellow-red card) 68'	Report	Abeid (yellow card) 31'; Robail 48'; Guillaume (yellow card) 74'; Masson (yellow card) 90'	Stadium: Stade Marcel Picot; Referee: Pierre Legat

21 August 2021 5	Caen	1–0	Nancy	Caen
19:00 CEST (UTC+2)	Mendy 17'	Report	Biron (yellow card) 90+1'	Stadium: Stade Michel d'Ornano; Attendance: 8,854; Referee: Olivier Thual

28 August 2021 6	Nancy	1–4	Auxerre	Tomblaine
19:00 CEST (UTC+2)	Bondo 83' (pen.); Basila (yellow card) 88'	Report	Jubal Jr. 6'; Arcus (yellow card) 17'; Ndom 30'; Bernard (yellow card) 61'; Charbonnier 63', 77'	Stadium: Stade Marcel Picot; Referee: Gael Angoula

11 September 2021 7	Dunkerque	0–0	Nancy	Dunkerque
19:00 CEST (UTC+2)	Vannoye (yellow card) 45+3'; Ba (yellow card) 61'; Kerrouche (yellow card) 84'	Report	Dewaele (yellow card) 18'; Haag (red card) 34'; Bondo (yellow card) 86'	Stadium: Stade Marcel-Tribut; Referee: Benjamin Lepaysant

18 September 2021 8	Nancy	1–1	Le Havre	Tomblaine
19:00 CEST (UTC+2)	Jung (yellow card) 35', (goal) 49' (pen.); Basila (yellow card) 37' (yellow-red card) 90+2'; El Aynaoui (yellow card) 90'	Report	Gibaud (yellow card) 41'; Cornette 56'; A. Ba (yellow card) 90+4'	Stadium: Stade Marcel Picot; Referee: Frank Schneider

21 September 2021 9	Grenoble	4–1	Nancy	Grenoble
19:00 CEST (UTC+2)	Ravet 25'; Anani (penalty missed) 45+1'; Perez (red card) 45+2'; Sylvestre-Brac 50'; Nestor 58'; Diallo (yellow card) 78'; Abdallah 85'	Report	Bianda 32'; El Aynaoui (yellow card) 39'; Trott (yellow card) 45'; Patrick (yellow card) 49'	Stadium: Stade des Alpes; Referee: Pierre Legat

24 September 2021 10	Nancy	1–1	Amiens	Tomblaine
21:00 CEST (UTC+2)	Biron (yellow card) 58'; Haag 61'	Report	Arokodare (yellow card) 9' (yellow-red card) 43'; Mendy 14'; Bamba (red card) 45+3'; Sy (yellow card) 90+8'	Stadium: Stade Marcel Picot; Referee: Olivier Thual

2 October 2021 11	Paris FC	1–1	Nancy	Paris
19:00 CEST (UTC+2)	Guilavogui 19'; Diakité (yellow card) 75'	Report	Akichi (yellow card) 7'; Latouchent 49'; El Kaoutari (yellow card) 62'	Stadium: Stade Sébastien Charléty; Referee: Gaël Angoula

16 October 2021 12	Nancy	2–1	Guingamp	Tomblaine
21:00 CEST (UTC+2)	Triboulet 59'; Dewaele (yellow card) 72'; Haag (red card) 75'; Jung 87'	Report	Carnot 17', (yellow card) 51'; Abi (yellow card) 45'; Barthelmé (yellow card) 49'; Muyumba (yellow card) 63'	Stadium: Stade Marcel Picot; Referee: Marc Bollengier

23 October 2021 13	Ajaccio	2–0	Nancy	Ajaccio
19:00 CEST (UTC+2)	Nouri 8', 58'; Gonzalez (yellow card) 16'	Report	Jung (yellow card) 42'	Stadium: Stade François Coty; Referee: Mathieu Vernice

30 October 2021 14	Nancy	0–0	Sochaux	Tomblaine
21:00 CEST (UTC+2)	Bertrand (yellow card) 25'	Report	Thioune (yellow card) 86'; Henry (yellow card) 88'	Stadium: Stade Marcel Picot; Referee: Benjamin Lepaysant

6 November 2021 15	Niort	1–3	Nancy	Niort
21:00 CEST (UTC+2)	Thiam 56' (o.g.); M'bondo (yellow card) 83'	Report	Biron 11', 48', 70' (pen.), (yellow card) 70'; Basila (yellow card) 39'	Stadium: Stade René Gaillard; Referee: Jerome Miguelgorry

20 November 2021 16	Nancy	0–2	Rodez	Tomblaine
21:00 CEST (UTC+2)	Biron (yellow card) 58'	Report	Leborgne 24' (pen.); Chougrani 31'; Boissier (yellow card) 37'	Stadium: Stade Marcel Picot; Referee: Pierre Legat

3 December 2021 17	Quevilly-Rouen	2–1	Nancy	Rouen
19:00 CET (UTC+1)	Cissokho 9'; Nazon 66'; Sangaré (yellow card) 76'; Sidibé (yellow card) 82'	Report	Thiam 3'; Delos (yellow card) 28'; El Kaoutari (yellow card) 80' (yellow-red card) 90+4'; Basila (yellow card) 90+1'	Stadium: Stade Robert Diochon; Referee: Bartolomeu Varela

11 December 2021 18	Nîmes	2–1	Nancy	Nîmes
19:00 CEST (UTC+2)	Ómarsson 27'; Burner (yellow card) 38'; Koné 44'; Fomba (yellow card) 69'; Martinez (yellow card) 88'	Report	Thiam 42'; Ciss (yellow card) 43'; Lefebvre (yellow card) 81' (yellow-red card) 82'	Stadium: Stade des Costières; Referee: Benjamin Lepaysant

21 December 2021 19	Nancy	0–3	Dijon	Tomblaine
20:45 CEST (UTC+2)	Haag (yellow card) 47'	Report	Traoré (yellow card) 2'; Dobre 23'; Congré (yellow card) 51'; Jacob 78'; Philippoteaux 80'	Stadium: Stade Marcel Picot; Referee: Marc Bollengier

15 January 2022 21	Nancy	2–1	Bastia	Tomblaine
19:00 CET (UTC+1)	Basila 25'; Jung (yellow card) 42', (goal) 90'; Dewaele (yellow card) 49'	Report	Roncaglia (yellow card) 31'; Saadi 85'	Stadium: Stade Marcel Picot; Referee: Antony Gautier

19 January 2022 20	Toulouse	4–0	Nancy	Toulouse
19:00 CET (UTC+1)	Onaiwu 29'; Genreau 30', (yellow card) 51'; Van den Boomen 55'; Nicolaisen (yellow card) 78'; Ratão 88'	Report	Basila (red card) 25'; Akichi (yellow card) 30'; Bianda (yellow card) 61'; Bobichon (yellow card) 66'	Stadium: Stadium de Toulouse; Referee: Olivier Thual
Note: The match was originally scheduled for 10 January 2022, but was postponed to 19 January 2022.

1 February 2022 22	Valenciennes	6–1	Nancy	Valenciennes
19:00 CET (UTC+1)	Yatabaré 12', 18'; Cuffaut 24' (pen.); Guillaume 31', 50'; Kaba (yellow card) 41'; Hamache 44'; Ouattara (yellow card) 87'	Report	Bianda (yellow card) 2'; Karamoko (yellow card) 17' (yellow-red card) 23'; Biron 27'; Latouchent (yellow card) 46'; El Kaoutari (yellow card) 60'	Stadium: Stade du Hainaut; Referee: Mathieu Vernice

5 February 2022 23	Nancy	1–1	Caen	Nancy
19:00 CET (UTC+1)	El Aynaoui (yellow card) 35'; Biron 55'	Report	Deminguet (yellow card) 9'; Rivierez (yellow card) 45'; Mendy 63'	Stadium: Stade Marcel Picot; Referee: Rémi Landry

12 February 2022 24	Auxerre	1–1	Nancy	Auxerre
19:00 CET (UTC+1)	Charbonnier (yellow card) 33'; Pellenard (yellow card) 38'; Autret (yellow card) 41'; Hein 45+4'	Report	Thiam 4'; El Aynaoui (yellow card) 45'	Stadium: Stade de l'Abbé-Deschamps; Referee: Marc Bollengier

19 February 2022 25	Nancy	2–0	Dunkerque	Tomblaine
19:00 CET (UTC+1)	Basila 16'; M. Thiam (yellow card) 45+1', (goal) 62'	Report	D. Thiam (yellow card) 51'; Huysman (yellow card) 65'	Stadium: Stade Marcel Picot; Referee: Aurelien Petit

26 February 2022 26	Le Havre	1–0	Nancy	Le Havre
19:00 CET (UTC+1)	Alioui 13'; Boura (yellow card) 40'	Report	Basila (yellow card) 15'; Bobichon (yellow card) 50'; Fontaine (yellow card) 63'	Stadium: Stade Océane; Referee: Bartolomeu Varela

5 March 2022 27	Nancy	0–1	Grenoble	Tomblaine
19:00 CET (UTC+1)	Basila (yellow card) 40'; Lefebvre (yellow card) 78'; Biron (yellow card) 85'; N'Gbakoto (yellow card) 90+6'; Simões (red card) 90+6'	Report	Cissé (yellow card) 27'; Tell 59'; Abdallah (yellow card) 85'	Stadium: Stade Marcel Picot; Referee: Nicolas Rainville

12 March 2022 28	Amiens	1–0	Nancy	Amiens
19:00 CET (UTC+1)	Lusamba (yellow card) 33'; Akolo 81', (yellow card) 85'	Report	Jung (yellow card) 90+3'	Stadium: Stade de la Licorne; Referee: Gaël Angoula

15 March 2022 29	Nancy	3–0	Paris FC	Tomblaine
20:00 CET (UTC+1)	Biron 10', 43', (yellow card) 62'; El Aynaoui 28'	Report	Gory (yellow card) 79'; Hadjam (yellow card) 86'	Stadium: Stade Marcel Picot; Referee: Jeremy Stinat

19 March 2022 30	Guingamp	3–1	Nancy	Guingamp
20:00 CET (UTC+1)	Roux 9'; M'Changama 37', 56'; Livolant (yellow card) 60'	Report	Bianda 36'; Ciss (yellow card) 76'	Stadium: Stade de Roudourou; Referee: Jérôme Miguelgorry

4 April 2022 31	Nancy	0–2	Ajaccio	Tomblaine
20:45 CEST (UTC+2)	Bianda (red card) 71'; Biron (yellow card) 89'	Report	Gonzalez (yellow card) 57'; Laçi (yellow card) 59'; El Idrissy 68'; Nouri (yellow card) 75'; Bayala 85'; Krasso (yellow card) 90+2'	Stadium: Stade Marcel Picot; Referee: Marc Bollengier

9 April 2022 32	Sochaux	1–0	Nancy	Montbéliard
20:00 CEST (UTC+2)	Ndiaye 36'; Mauricio (yellow card) 45+2'; Ndour (yellow card) 64'	Report	Bobichon (yellow card) 45+2'; Valette (red card) 89'	Stadium: Stade Auguste Bonal; Referee: Guillaume Paradis

16 April 2022 33	Nancy	0–2	Niort	Tomblaine
19:00 CEST (UTC+2)		Report	Vallier (yellow card) 15'; Boutobba 48'; Mendes 83'	Stadium: Stade Marcel Picot; Referee: Arnaud Baert

19 April 2022 34	Rodez	1–1	Nancy	Rodez
20:00 CEST (UTC+2)	Corredor 48'; Célestine (yellow card) 63'	Report	N'Gbakoto 60'; Latouchent (yellow card) 66'	Stadium: Stade Paul-Lignon; Referee: Gaël Angoula

22 April 2022 35	Nancy	0–3	Quevilly-Rouen	Tomblaine
21:00 CEST (UTC+2)	Lefebvre (yellow card) 12'	Report	Lambese 13'; Sabaly 18'; Nazon 34'	Stadium: Stade Marcel Picot; Referee: Rémi Landry

30 April 2022 36	Nancy	1–3	Nîmes	Tomblaine
21:00 CEST (UTC+2)	L. Cissé 61' (pen.); Haag (yellow card) 76'	Report	Sarr (yellow card) 16', (goal) 44'; Koné 64', 90+2'; Briançon (yellow card) 70'	Stadium: Stade Marcel Picot; Referee: Bartolomeu Varela

7 May 2022 37	Dijon	2–3	Nancy	Dijon
19:00 CEST (UTC+2)	Coulibaly 5'; Ecuele Manga 78'	Report	N'Gbakoto 53', 76'; Bobichon 62'	Stadium: Stade Gaston Gérard; Referee: Olivier Thual

14 May 2022 38	Nancy	2–3	Pau	Tomblaine
19:00 CEST (UTC+2)	El Aynaoui 4'; L. Cissé 11'; Haag (yellow card) 60'	Report	Essende 10'; Gomis 28'; Batisse 36', (yellow card) 88'	Stadium: Stade Marcel Picot; Referee: Arnaud Baert

=== Coupe de France ===
14 November 2021 Seventh round	UL Plantières Metz	1–3	Nancy	Longeville-lès-Metz (Note: Tie was originally reversed from original draw due to UL Plantières Metz not having a ground of the required standard. On 10 November 2021 it was announced that funding had been raised to pay the security costs at Stade Saint-Symphorien, near Metz, and the original tie was reinstated.)
14:00 CET (UTC+1)	Santos 17'	Report	Triboulet 59'; Jung 68'; Francke 85'	Stadium: Stade Saint-Symphorien; Referee: Frank Schneider

27 November 2021 Eighth round	FC Soleil Bischheim	0–1	Nancy	Bischheim
14:30 CET (UTC+1)		Report	Simões 64'	Stadium: Parc des Sports; Referee: Marc Bollengier

18 December 2021 Round of 64	Troyes	1–1 (2–4 p)	Nancy	Troyes
13:45 CET (UTC+1)	Domingues 44' (pen.)	Report	Jung 64'	Stadium: Stade de l'Aube; Referee: Willy Delajod

2 January 2022 Round of 32	Nancy	1–1 (4–3 p)	Rennes	Nancy
16:00 CET (UTC+1)	Biron 78'	Report	Guirassy (penalty missed) 28'; Doku 58'	Stadium: Stade Marcel Picot; Referee: Antony Gautier
	Penalties
	Bondo (penalty scored); Biron (penalty missed); Triboulet (penalty scored); Bertrand (penalty scored); Simões (penalty missed); Delos (penalty scored)		(penalty missed) Laborde; (penalty scored) Majer; (penalty scored) Martin; (penalty missed) Tel; (penalty scored) Santamaria; (penalty missed) Badé

29 January 2022 Round of 16	Nancy	0–2	Amiens	Tomblaine
16:15 CET (UTC+1)		Report	Lusamba 15'; Arokodare 38'	Stadium: Stade Marcel Picot; Referee: Bastien Dechepy
