= 2021–22 SC Bastia season =

SC Bastia
2021–22 season
- President: Claude Ferrandi
- Head coach: Régis Brouard
- Stadium: Stade Armand Cesari
- Ligue 2: 12th
- Coupe de France: Quarter-finals
- Top goalscorer: League: Benjamin Santelli (9); All: Benjamin Santelli (10)
Home colours	Away colours	Third colours

The 2021–22 season was the 117th season in the existence of SC Bastia and the club's first season back in the second division of French football. In addition to the domestic league, Bastia participated in this season's edition of the Coupe de France.

== Players ==
=== First-team squad ===
As of 24 January 2022.

Note: Flags indicate national team as defined under FIFA eligibility rules; some limited exceptions apply. Players may hold more than one non-FIFA nationality.

No.	Pos.	Nation	Player
1	GK	FRA	Zacharie Boucher
3	MF	FRA	Antony Robic
4	DF	FRA	Anthony Roncaglia
5	MF	FRA	Gary Coulibaly
6	DF	FRA	Dominique Guidi
7	MF	FRA	Christophe Vincent
8	FW	FRA	Kévin Schur
9	FW	FRA	Benjamin Santelli
10	MF	FRA	Sébastien Salles-Lamonge
12	MF	MLI	Yacouba Sylla
14	MF	MAR	Amine Talal
15	DF	FRA	Yohan Bocognano
16	GK	FRA	Thomas Vincensini
17	MF	FRA	Maguette Diongue

No.	Pos.	Nation	Player
18	MF	TUN	Chaouki Ben Saada
19	FW	ALG	Idriss Saadi
20	DF	FRA	Kylian Kaïboué
21	FW	FRA	Adil Taoui
22	FW	FRA	Frank Magri
23	DF	GAB	Lloyd Palun
25	MF	FRA	Tom Ducrocq (on loan from Lens)
26	DF	FRA	Julien Le Cardinal
28	DF	FRA	Joris Sainati
29	DF	FRA	Julien Boyer (on loan from Clermont)
30	GK	HAI	Johny Placide
32	DF	FRA	Alexandre Jourda
—	MF	FRA	Anthony Angelini
—	FW	COD	Harrison Manzala

=== Out on loan ===
Note: Flags indicate national team as defined under FIFA eligibility rules; some limited exceptions apply. Players may hold more than one non-FIFA nationality.

No.	Pos.	Nation	Player
—	DF	FRA	Samuel Guibert (at Bastia-Borgo)

== Transfers ==
=== In ===
Pos	Player	Transferred from	Fee	Date	Source
FW	(France) Kenny Nagera	(France) Paris Saint-Germain	Loan	3 August 2021	

=== Out ===
Pos	Player	Transferred to	Fee	Date	Source
FW	(France) Kenny Nagera	(France) Paris Saint-Germain	Loan return	17 January 2022	

== Pre-season and friendlies ==
Win Draw Loss

8 July 2021 Friendly	Annecy (France)	2–3	(France) Bastia	Aix-les-Bains, France
19:00 CEST (UTC+2)				Stadium: Stade Jacques-Forestier

16 July 2021 Friendly	Bastia (France)	1–0	(France) Nice	Divonne-les-Bains, France
18:00 CEST (UTC+2)	Robic 77' (pen.)			Stadium: Complexe sportif de Divonne-les-Bains; Attendance: 0 Referee: Karim Abed

== Competitions ==
=== Overall record ===
Competition	First match	Last match	Starting round	Final position	Record							
Competition	First match	Last match	Starting round	Final position	Pld	W	D	L	GF	GA	GD	Win %
Ligue 2	24 July 2021	14 May 2022	Matchday 1	12th	38	10	16	12	38	36	+2	26.32
Coupe de France	13 November 2021	10 February 2022	Seventh round	Quarter-finals	6	3	2	1	9	5	+4	50.00
Total					44	13	18	13	47	41	+6	29.55

Source: Soccerway

=== Ligue 2 ===
==== League table ====
Pos	Team	Pld	W	D	L	GF	GA	GD	Pts
10	Pau	38	14	7	17	41	49	−8	49
11	Dijon	38	13	8	17	48	53	−5	47
12	Bastia	38	10	16	12	38	36	+2	46
13	Niort	38	12	10	16	39	42	−3	46
14	Amiens	38	9	17	12	43	41	+2	44

Source: Ligue 2
Rules for classification: 1) Points; 2) Goal difference; 3) Number of goals scored; 4) Head-to-head goal difference; 5) Fair play points

==== Results summary ====
Overall								Home						Away					
Pld	W	D	L	GF	GA	GD	Pts	W	D	L	GF	GA	GD	W	D	L	GF	GA	GD
38	10	16	12	38	36	+2	46	5	12	2	19	12	+7	5	4	10	19	24	−5

Source: Ligue 2

==== Results by round ====
Round	1	2	3	4	5	6	7	8	9	10	11	12	13	14	15	16	17	18	19	20	21	22	23	24	25	26	27	28	29	30	31	32	33	34	35	36	37	38
Ground	H	A	H	A	A	H	A	H	A	H	A	H	A	H	A	H	A	H	A	H	A	H	H	A	H	A	H	A	H	A	H	A	H	A	H	A	H	A
Result	D	W	D	L	L	D	L	D	L	W	L	D	L	D	W	W	L	D	D	W	L	D	D	W	D	L	D	W	W	D	D	D	L	D	W	L	L	W
Position	11	14	14	11	14	14	15	14	18	16	16	18	19	19	18	14	18	18	18	13	14	16	15	15	15	16	15	14	12	14	14	14	14	14	14	14	15	12

Source: Ligue 2
A = Away; H = Home; W = Win; D = Draw; L = Loss

==== Matches ====
The league fixtures were announced on 25 June 2021.

24 July 2021 1	Bastia	1–1	Nîmes	Furiani
15:00 CEST (UTC+2)	Diongue 51'	Report	Fomba 12'	Stadium: Stade Armand Cesari; Referee: Jérôme Miguelgorry

11 August 2021 3	Bastia	1–1	Nancy	Furiani
19:00 CEST (UTC+2)	Saadi 12'; Sainati (yellow card) 63'; Schur (yellow card) 80'	Report	Delos (yellow card) 19'; Sainati 76' (o.g.)	Stadium: Stade Armand Cesari; Referee: Pierre Gaillouste

14 August 2021 4	Toulouse	1–0	Bastia	Toulouse
15:00 CEST (UTC+2)	van den Boomen 23' (pen.)	Report	Ducrocq (yellow card) 9'; Vincent (yellow card) 57'	Stadium: Stadium de Toulouse; Referee: Antony Gautier

18 August 2021 2	Quevilly-Rouen	1–2	Bastia	Rouen
19:00 CEST (UTC+2)	Nazon (yellow card) 50'; Padovani 77'; Bansais (yellow card) 88'	Report	Diongue 24', (yellow card) 37'; Palun (yellow card) 27'; Schur 60'	Stadium: Stade Robert Diochon; Referee: Pierre Legat

21 August 2021 5	Pau	2–0	Bastia	Pau
19:00 CEST (UTC+2)	Koffi 38'; Assifuah 49'; Daubin (yellow card) 61'; Gomis (yellow card) 70'	Report	Schur (yellow card) 28'; Santelli (yellow card) 34'; Guidi (red card) 86'	Stadium: Nouste Camp; Referee: Arnaud Baert

28 August 2021 6	Bastia	0–0	Le Havre	Furiani
19:00 CEST (UTC+2)	Santelli (yellow card) 18'; Quemper (yellow card) 62'	Report	Richardson (yellow card) 52'; Ba (yellow card) 58'	Stadium: Stade Armand Cesari; Referee: Aurelien Petit

11 September 2021 7	Dijon	2–1	Bastia	Dijon
19:00 CEST (UTC+2)	Deaux (yellow card) 33'; Congré (yellow card) 48'; Benzia 58', 87'; Traoré (yellow card) 83'	Report	Vincent (yellow card) 33'; Le Cardinal (yellow card) 39'; Schur (yellow card) 62'; Santelli 70'	Stadium: Stade Gaston Gérard; Referee: Bartolomeu Varela

18 September 2021 8	Bastia	1–1	Caen	Furiani
19:00 CEST (UTC+2)	Santelli 13'; Bocognano (yellow card) 79'; Quemper (yellow card) 90'	Report	Wadja (yellow card) 71'; Mendy 90+1' (pen.)	Stadium: Stade Armand Cesari; Attendance: 7,682; Referee: Guillaume Paradis

21 September 2021 9	Valenciennes	2–1	Bastia	Valenciennes
20:00 CEST (UTC+2)	Cuffaut 7' (pen.); Ntim (yellow card) 16'; Lecoeuche (yellow card) 62'; Robail 66'; Kaba (yellow card) 88'	Report	Palun (yellow card) 6'; Santelli 43'; Robic (yellow card) 57'	Stadium: Stade du Hainaut; Referee: Alexandre Perreau Niel

25 September 2021 10	Bastia	2–0	Ajaccio	Furiani
15:00 CEST (UTC+2)	Santelli 49'; Schur (yellow card) 61', (goal) 63'	Report	Courtet (yellow card) 34'; Kalulu (yellow card) 42'; Diallo (yellow card) 51'	Stadium: Stade Armand Cesari; Referee: Florent Batta

2 October 2021 11	Dunkerque	2–0	Bastia	Dunkirk
19:00 CEST (UTC+2)	Tchokounté (yellow card) 33', (goal) 58', 86'	Report	Quemper (yellow card) 21'	Stadium: Stade Marcel-Tribut; Referee: Remi Landry

16 October 2021 12	Bastia	0–0	Grenoble	Furiani
19:00 CEST (UTC+2)		Report	Gaspar (yellow card) 44'; Gersbach (yellow card) 54'	Stadium: Stade Armand Cesari; Referee: Nicolas Rainville

25 October 2021 13	Auxerre	1–0	Bastia	Auxerre
20:45 CEST (UTC+2)	Touré 34'; Charbonnier (yellow card) 37'; Coeff (yellow card) 66'	Report	Ducrocq (yellow card) 59'	Stadium: Stade de l'Abbé-Deschamps; Referee: Pierre Legat

30 October 2021 14	Bastia	0–0	Amiens	Furiani
19:00 CEST (UTC+2)	Vincent (yellow card) 13'; Robic (yellow card) 90+3'	Report	Badji (yellow card) 37'; Pavlović (yellow card) 60'; Bénet (yellow card) 90+3'	Stadium: Stade Armand Cesari; Referee: Thomas Léonard

6 November 2021 15	Guingamp	2–3	Bastia	Guingamp
19:00 CET (UTC+1)	M'Changama 53'; Guidi 90+3' (o.g.); Abi (yellow card) 90+4'	Report	Santelli 28', (yellow card) 33'; Le Cardinal (yellow card) 45+3'; Salles-Lamonge 60'; Saadi 63'; Robic (yellow card) 90+4'	Stadium: Stade de Roudourou; Referee: Benjamin Lepaysant

20 November 2021 16	Bastia	2–0	Niort	Furiani
19:00 CET (UTC+1)	Santelli 14', (yellow card) 34'; Salles-Lamonge 43'; Le Cardinal (yellow card) 57'; Ducrocq (yellow card) 90+3'	Report	Mendes (yellow card) 34', (penalty missed) 72'; Merdji (yellow card) 75'; Lebeau (yellow card) 90+3'	Stadium: Stade Armand Cesari; Referee: Johann Hamel

3 December 2021 17	Paris FC	1–0	Bastia	Paris
21:00 CET (UTC+1)	Kanté (yellow card) 55'; Name 89' (pen.)	Report	Vincent (yellow card) 34'; Guidi (yellow card) 58'	Stadium: Stade Sébastien Charléty; Referee: Olivier Thual

11 December 2021 18	Bastia	2–2	Sochaux	Furiani
19:00 CET (UTC+1)	Salles-Lamonge (yellow card) 26'; Vincent 28'; Saadi 35'; Le Cardinal (yellow card) 56'	Report	Kalulu (penalty missed) 67', 79'; Kitala (yellow card) 77'; Ndiaye 87'	Stadium: Stade Armand Cesari; Referee: Aurelien Petit

21 December 2021 19	Rodez	0–0	Bastia	Rodez
20:45 CET (UTC+1)	Malanda (yellow card) 50'; Buadés (yellow card) 71'	Report	Vincent (yellow card) 25'; Quemper (yellow card) 54'; Kaïboué (yellow card) 74'	Stadium: Stade Paul-Lignon; Referee: Frank Schneider

8 January 2022 20	Bastia	3–0	Quevilly-Rouen	Furiani
19:00 CET (UTC+1)	Santelli 14'; Vincent (yellow card) 17'; Kaïboué 80'; Talal 87'	Report	Gbellé (yellow card) 32'	Stadium: Stade Armand Cesari; Referee: Ruddy Buquet

15 January 2022 21	Nancy	2–1	Bastia	Tomblaine
19:00 CET (UTC+1)	Basila 25'; Jung (yellow card) 42', (goal) 90'; Dewaele (yellow card) 49'	Report	Roncaglia (yellow card) 31'; Saadi 85'	Stadium: Stade Marcel Picot; Referee: Antony Gautier

22 January 2022 22	Bastia	0–0	Toulouse	Furiani
19:00 CET (UTC+1)	Vincent (yellow card) 39'; Guidi (yellow card) 46'; Santelli (yellow card) 86'; Kaïboué (red card) 87'	Report	Evitt-Healey (yellow card) 43'; Spierings (yellow card) 80'; Desler (yellow card) 86', (red card) 87'	Stadium: Stade Armand Cesari; Referee: Nicolas Rainville

5 February 2022 23	Bastia	1–1	Pau	Furiani
19:00 CET (UTC+1)	Santelli 50'	Report	Essende 56'	Stadium: Stade Armand Cesari; Referee: Guillaume Paradis

14 February 2022 24	Le Havre	2–4	Bastia	Le Havre
20:45 CET (UTC+1)	Abdelli 9' (pen.); Abline 17' (pen.)	Report	Vincent 24'; Schur 29'; Magri 56'; Robic 90+4'	Stadium: Stade Océane; Referee: Jérôme Miguelgorry

19 February 2022 25	Bastia	0–0	Dijon	Furiani
19:00 CET (UTC+1)	Guidi (yellow card) 21'; Ben Saada (yellow card) 85'	Report		Stadium: Stade Armand Cesari; Referee: Remi Landry

26 February 2022 26	Caen	2–1	Bastia	Caen
19:00 CET (UTC+1)	da Costa 27', 53'; Lepenant (yellow card) 65'	Report	Santelli (yellow card) 7'; Salles-Lamonge 15'; Palun (yellow card) 41'; Le Cardinal (yellow card) 75'; Vincent (yellow card) 90+4'	Stadium: Stade Michel d'Ornano; Referee: Johan Hamel

5 March 2022 27	Bastia	1–1	Valenciennes	Furiani
19:00 CET (UTC+1)	Sainati (yellow card) 16'; Abeid 20' (o.g.); Magri (yellow card) 64'; Robic (yellow card) 87'; Guidi (yellow card) 89'	Report	Bonnet 11', (yellow card) 89'; Abeid (yellow card) 59'; Chevalier (yellow card) 87'	Stadium: Stade Armand Cesari; Referee: Jérôme Brisard

12 March 2022 28	Ajaccio	0–1	Bastia	Ajaccio
15:00 CET (UTC+1)		Report	Boyer (yellow card) 10'; Robic (yellow card) 26'; Roncaglia 42'; Palun (yellow card) 49'; Sylla (yellow card) 85'; Santelli (yellow card) 87'	Stadium: Stade François Coty; Referee: Hakim Ben El Hadj

15 March 2022 29	Bastia	1–0	Dunkerque	Furiani
20:00 CET (UTC+1)	Guidi (yellow card) 14'; Talal 21'; Palun (yellow card) 58'; Roncaglia (yellow card) 90+2'; Santelli (yellow card) 90+3'	Report	Ba (yellow card) 2'	Stadium: Stade Armand Cesari; Referee: Alexandre Perreau Niel

19 March 2022 30	Grenoble	1–1	Bastia	Grenoble
20:00 CET (UTC+1)	Anani 52'; Perez (yellow card) 60'	Report	Kaïboué (yellow card) 45+1'; Sylla 65'; Le Cardinal (yellow card) 74'	Stadium: Stade des Alpes; Referee: Pierre Legat

2 April 2022 31	Bastia	1–1	Auxerre	Furiani
20:00 CET (UTC+1)	Magri 45'; Le Cardinal (yellow card) 64'	Report	Jubal (yellow card) 50'; Ben Fredj 90'	Stadium: Stade Armand Cesari; Referee: Frank Schneider

9 April 2022 32	Amiens	0–0	Bastia	Amiens
19:00 CET (UTC+1)	Gene (yellow card) 60'; Pavlović (yellow card) 90+3'	Report	Santelli (yellow card) 63'	Stadium: Stade de la Licorne; Referee: Benjamin Lepaysant

16 April 2022 33	Bastia	1–2	Guingamp	Furiani
19:00 CET (UTC+1)	Sainati (yellow card) 44'; Guidi (yellow card) 53'; Talal 57'	Report	Ba (yellow card) 51'; Pierrot 62', 74'	Stadium: Stade Armand Cesari; Referee: Nicolas Rainville

19 April 2022 34	Niort	1–1	Bastia	Niort
20:00 CET (UTC+1)	Conté (yellow card) 36'; Sissoko (yellow card) 45', (goal) 67'	Report	Schur (yellow card) 3'; Boyer (yellow card) 35'; Santelli 38' (pen.); Guidi (yellow card) 45'; Magri (yellow card) 45'	Stadium: Stade René Gaillard; Referee: Thomas Léonard

22 April 2022 35	Bastia	2–1	Paris FC	Furiani
21:00 CEST (UTC+2)	Guidi 15', 45+1'; Sainati (yellow card) 39'	Report	Camara (yellow card) 55'; Guilavogui (yellow card) 69'; Name 81'	Stadium: Stade Armand-Cesari; Referee: Abdelatif Kherradji

30 April 2022 36	Sochaux	2–1	Bastia	Montbéliard
20:00 CET (UTC+1)	Robic 68' (o.g.); Ambri (yellow card) 73'; Henry 90'; Kalulu (yellow card) 90+3'	Report	Palun (yellow card) 13'; Kaïboué (yellow card) 20'; Sylla (yellow card) 56'; Pogba 79' (o.g.)	Stadium: Stade Auguste Bonal; Referee: Marc Bollengier

7 May 2022 37	Bastia	0–1	Rodez	Furiani
21:00 CEST (UTC+2)	Robic (yellow card) 86'	Report	Célestine (yellow card) 16'; Boissier (yellow card) 33'; Corredor 90+3'	Stadium: Stade Armand-Cesari; Referee: Pierre Legat

14 May 2022 38	Nîmes	0–2	Bastia	Nîmes
19:00 CEST (UTC+2)	Eliasson (yellow card) 82'	Report	Le Cardinal 48'; Zolotov (yellow card) 52'; Santelli 65'	Stadium: Stade des Costières; Referee: Benjamin Lepaysant

=== Coupe de France ===
13 November 2021 Seventh round	Fougères AGLD	0–2	Bastia	Fougères
19:00 CET (UTC+1)		Report	Robic 69'; Salles-Lamonge 85'	Stadium: Stade Jean Manfredi Paron Nord; Referee: Pierre Legat

26 November 2021 Eighth round	Les Herbiers VF	1–1 (3–4 p)	Bastia	Les Herbiers
19:30 CET (UTC+1)	Grellier 34'	Report	Schur 18'	Stadium: Stade Massabielle; Referee: Bartolomeu Varela Teles

18 December 2021 Round of 64	Hauts Lyonnais	1–3	Bastia	Feurs
13:45 CET (UTC+1)	Boussaïd 57'	Report	Sainati 5'; Le Cardinal 34'; Saadi 45+1'	Stadium: Stade Maurice Rousson; Referee: Abdelatif Kherradji

2 January 2022 Round of 32	Bastia	2–0	Clermont	Furiani
16:00 CET (UTC+1)	Santelli 25'; Robic 70'	Report		Stadium: Stade Armand-Cesari; Referee: Pierre Gaillouste

29 January 2022 Round of 16	Reims	1–1 (3–5 p)	Bastia	Reims
18:30 CET (UTC+1)	Kebbal (yellow card) 27'; Ekitike 37'	Report	Salles-Lamonge (yellow card) 26', (goal) 71'; Schur (yellow card) 58'	Stadium: Stade Auguste-Delaune; Referee: Stéphanie Frappart
	Penalties
	Ekitike (penalty scored); Hornby (penalty scored); Gravillon (penalty missed); Mbuku (penalty scored)		(penalty scored) Taoui; (penalty scored) Bocognano; (penalty scored) Vincent; (penalty scored) Magri; (penalty scored) Santelli

10 February 2022 Quarter-finals	Nantes	2–0	Bastia	Nantes
21:00 CET (UTC+1)	Blas 3' (pen.); Kolo Muani 71'	Report	Sainati (yellow card) 1'; Robic (yellow card) 85'	Stadium: Stade de la Beaujoire; Referee: Antony Gautier
