= 2022–23 KV Oostende season =

K.V. Oostende
2022–23 season
- Chairman: Franck Dierckens
- Manager: Dominik Thalhammer
- Stadium: Diaz Arena
- Belgian Pro League: 16th (relegated)
- Belgian Cup: Seventh round

The 2022–23 K.V. Oostende season was the club's 119th season in existence and the 10th consecutive season in the top flight of Belgian football. In addition to the domestic league, Oostende participated in this season's edition of the Belgian Cup. The season covered the period from 1 July 2022 to 30 June 2023.

== Players ==
=== First-team squad ===
As of 31 August 2022

Note: Flags indicate national team as defined under FIFA eligibility rules; some limited exceptions apply. Players may hold more than one non-FIFA nationality.

No.	Pos.	Nation	Player
1	GK	ENG	Dillon Phillips (on loan from Cardiff City)
2	DF	NED	Osaze Urhoghide (on loan from Celtic)
3	DF	ENG	Zech Medley
4	DF	CRO	Mateo Barać (on loan from Krylia Sovetov Samara)
5	DF	CYP	Fanos Katelaris
6	MF	FRA	Maxime D'Arpino
7	DF	FRA	Théo Ndicka
8	MF	NIR	Cameron McGeehan
10	MF	CPV	Kenny Rocha Santos
11	MF	BEL	Indy Boonen
14	FW	SCO	Dapo Mebude
16	MF	BEL	Sieben Dewaele
17	FW	CRO	Ivan Durdov
18	MF	JPN	Tatsuhiro Sakamoto
19	DF	BEL	Manuel Osifo
20	FW	BEL	Andy Musayev

No.	Pos.	Nation	Player
22	GK	BEL	Jordy Schelfhout
23	DF	GER	Alfons Amade
26	MF	AUT	Kelvin Arase (on loan from Karlsruher SC)
27	DF	BEL	Brecht Capon
28	GK	BEL	Guillaume Hubert
29	MF	BEL	Robbie D'Haese
33	DF	BEL	Anton Tanghe
34	DF	GER	Nick Bätzner
36	DF	BEL	Siebe Wylin
39	FW	SCO	Fraser Hornby (on loan from Reims)
68	FW	GLP	Thierry Ambrose
77	FW	GHA	David Atanga
80	MF	BEL	Pierre Dwomoh (on loan from Antwerp)
88	DF	CRO	Matej Rodin
90	FW	BEL	Mohamed Berte

=== Out on loan ===
Note: Flags indicate national team as defined under FIFA eligibility rules; some limited exceptions apply. Players may hold more than one non-FIFA nationality.

No.	Pos.	Nation	Player
—	DF	FRA	Thomas Basila (at Nancy until 30 June 2023)
—	DF	USA	Kyle Duncan (at New York Red Bulls until 31 December 2023)
—	MF	BEL	Evangelos Patoulidis (at Den Bosch until 30 June 2023)
—	MF	FRA	Vincent Koziello (at Virton until 30 June 2023)

No.	Pos.	Nation	Player
—	MF	BEL	Alessandro Albanese (at Virton until 30 June 2023)
—	FW	SEN	Makhtar Gueye (at Zaragoza until 30 June 2023)
—	FW	FRA	Andrew Jung (at Quevilly-Rouen until 30 June 2023)
—	FW	FRA	Thomas Robinet (at Nancy until 30 June 2023)

== Transfers ==
=== In ===
Pos	Player	Transferred from	Fee	Date	Source
DF	(Cyprus) Fanos Katelaris	(Cyprus) Apollon Limassol	Free	15 June 2022	
GK	(England) Dillon Phillips	(Wales) Cardiff City	Loan	27 July 2022	
FW	(Scotland) Fraser Hornby	(France) Reims	Loan	28 July 2022	
FW	(France) Thomas Robinet	(France) Châteauroux	Undisclosed	1 September 2022	
FW	(Scotland) Dapo Mebude	(England) Watford	Undisclosed	3 September 2022	
FW	Mohammed Berte	(Netherlands) Den Bosch	End of loan	8 September 2022	
FW	Preben Stiers	(Netherlands) Den Bosch	End of loan	8 September 2022	
MF	Sieben Dewaele	(France) Nancy	End of loan	8 September 2022	
DF	(United States) Kyle Duncan	(United States) New York Red Bulls	End of loan	27 October 2022	
MF	Pierre Dwomoh	Antwerp	Loan	2 January 2023	
DF	(Croatia) Matej Rodin	(Poland) Cracovia	Free	2 January 2023	
FW	(Croatia) Ivan Durdov	(Slovenia) Domžale	Free	17 January 2023	
MF	(Austria) Kelvin Arase	(Germany) Karlsruher SC	Free	20 January 2023	
DF	(Croatia) Mateo Barać	(Russia) Krylia Sovetov Samara	Loan	1 February 2023	

=== Out ===
Pos	Player	Transferred to	Fee	Date	Source
FW	(Martinique) Mickaël Biron	RWDM	Undisclosed	16 July 2022	
DF	(United States) Kyle Duncan	(United States) New York Red Bulls	Loan	5 August 2022	
MF	Evangelos Patoulidis	(Netherlands) Den Bosch	Loan	31 August 2022	
FW	(Senegal) Makhtar Gueye	(Spain) Zaragoza	Loan	31 August 2022	
FW	(France) Andrew Jung	(France) Quevilly-Rouen	Loan	31 August 2022	
FW	(France) Thomas Robinet	(France) Nancy	Loan	1 September 2022	
FW	(Austria) Marko Kvasina	(Turkey) Göztepe	Undisclosed	8 September 2022	
DF	(Germany) Frederik Jäkel	(Germany) RB Leipzig	End of loan	8 September 2022	
DF	(France) Steven Fortès	(France) Lens	End of loan	8 September 2022	
GK	(Netherlands) Kjell Scherpen	(England) Brighton & Hove Albion	End of loan	8 September 2022	
DF	(United States) Kyle Duncan	(United States) New York Red Bulls	Loan	15 January 2023	
MF	(France) Vincent Koziello	Virton	Loan	11 January 2023	
MF	Alessandro Albanese	Virton	Loan	18 January 2023	

== Pre-season and friendlies ==
Win Draw Loss Fixtures

17 June 2022	Oudenburg	0–12	Oostende	Oudenburg, Belgium
		Report	Bätzner 8', 10', 34'; Patoulidis 18', 30'; Coninckx 31'; D'Haese 46'; Sakamoto 56'; Atanga 61', 78', 84'; Albanese 87'

18 June 2022	Zwevezele	0–15	Oostende	Zwevezele, Belgium
		Report	Atanga 3', 44'; Amade 5', 40'; ? 21' (o.g.); Musayev 47', 68', 90'; Bätzner 48', 87'; Ndicka 55'; ? 65' (o.g.); Boonen 71'; Patoulidis 80'; Coninckx 84'	Stadium: Sportcomplex Zwevezele

24 June 2022	Harelbeke	5–3	Oostende	Harelbeke, Belgium
	Lamin 2'; Santens 4', 29'; Vandekerckhove 26', 53'	Report	D'Haese 7'; Berte 64'; Ambrose 84' (pen.)	Stadium: Stedelijk Forestiersstadion; Referee: Kevin Van Damme

25 June 2022	Torhout	1–3	Oostende	Torhout, Belgium
18:00	Pyck 43'	Report	Ambrose 41', 45'; Patoulidis 81'	Stadium: De Velodroom; Referee: Bart Zeebroeck

1 July 2022	Amiens	1–4	Oostende	Le Touquet, France
	Barry (?)	Report	Ambrose (?); Biron (?); Patoulidis (?)	Stadium: Stade Gérard Houllier

2 July 2022	Oudenaarde	0–11	Oostende	Oudenaarde, Belgium
		Report	Osifo 4'; Bätzner 15'; Biron 16', 44'; Musayev 22', 34', 38', 49'; Berte 53'; Boonen 80', 88'	Stadium: Burgemeester Thienpontstadion

8 July 2022	Oostende	4–0	Deinze	Ostend, Belgium
14:00	Gueye 36' (pen.); Albanese 77'; Kvasina 83' (pen.); Berte 85'	Report		Stadium: Diaz Arena; Attendance: 0 (behind closed doors); Referee: Arthur Denil

9 July 2022	Oostende	3–1	Zulte Waregem	Oudenburg, Belgium
15:00	Katelaris 29'; Biron 47', 84'	Report	Demuynck 86'	Referee: Butterberg

15 July 2022	Oostende	4–5	Kortrijk	Ostend, Belgium
	Albanese 14'; Sissoko 30' (o.g.); Kvasina 61'; Berte 63'	Report	Henen 8', 18'; ? 57'; ? 74'; ? 90'	Stadium: Diaz Arena

17 July 2022	Oostende	2–0	Vitesse	Ostend, Belgium
15:00	D'Haese 75'; Sakamoto 79'	Report		Stadium: Diaz Arena

22 September 2022	Valenciennes	0–1	Oostende	Valenciennes, France
		Report	Ndicka (?)

3 December 2022	Oostende	1–0	PEC Zwolle	Murcia, Spain
12:00		Report

7 December 2022	Oostende	2–2	Lille	Ostend, Belgium
17:00	Ambrose (?); Boonen 85'	Report	Virginius (?)	Stadium: Diaz Arena

10 December 2022	Feyenoord	2–0	Oostende	Rotterdam, Netherlands
13:00	Kökçü 3' (pen.); Sauer (?)	Report

23 March 2023	Oostende	1–3	Deinze	Ostend, Belgium
	Rocha 51' (pen.)	Report	Kassimi 35'; Gonzalez 53'; Ferdinan 73'	Stadium: Diaz Arena; Referee: Jasper Vitse

== Competitions ==
=== Overview ===
Competition	First match	Last match	Starting round	Final position	Record							
Competition	First match	Last match	Starting round	Final position	Pld	W	D	L	GF	GA	GD	Win %
Belgian Pro League	24 July 2022	23 April 2023	Matchday 1	16th	34	7	6	21	37	76	−39	20.59
Belgian Cup	9 November 2022	20 December 2022	Sixth round	Seventh round	2	1	0	1	5	3	+2	50.00
Total					36	8	6	22	42	79	−37	22.22

Source: Soccerway

=== Belgian Pro League ===
==== League table ====
Pos	Team	Pld	W	D	L	GF	GA	GD	Pts	Qualification or relegation
14	Kortrijk	34	8	7	19	37	61	−24	31	
15	Eupen	34	7	7	20	40	75	−35	28	
16	Oostende (R)	34	7	6	21	37	76	−39	27	Relegation to Challenger Pro League
17	Zulte Waregem (R)	34	6	9	19	50	78	−28	27	Relegation to Challenger Pro League
18	Seraing (R)	34	5	5	24	28	68	−40	20	Relegation to Challenger Pro League

Source: Jupiler Pro League (in Dutch), Soccerway
Rules for classification: 1) Points; 2) Matches won; 3) Goal difference; 4) Goals scored; 5) Away matches won; 6) Away goal difference; 7) Away goals scored; 8) Play-off.
(R) Relegated

==== Results summary ====
Overall								Home						Away					
Pld	W	D	L	GF	GA	GD	Pts	W	D	L	GF	GA	GD	W	D	L	GF	GA	GD
34	7	6	21	38	75	−37	27	5	1	11	18	33	−15	2	5	10	20	42	−22

Last updated: 7 August 2023.
Source: Jupiler Pro League

==== Results by round ====
Round	1	2	3	4	5	6	7	8	9	10	11	12	13	14	15	16	17	18	19	20	21	22	23	24	25	26	27	28	29	30	31	32	33	34
Ground	A	H	A	H	H	A	A	H	A	H	A	H	A	H	A	H	A	A	H	A	H	H	A	H	A	H	A	H	A	H	H	A	H	A
Result	L	W	W	L	L	L	L	W	D	L	D	L	L	W	L	W	L	L	L	L	L	L	D	L	D	D	L	W	D	L	L	L	L	W
Position																																		16

Updated to match(es) played on 23 April 2023. Source: Jupiler Pro League
A = Away; H = Home; W = Win; D = Draw; L = Loss

==== Matches ====
The league fixtures were announced on 22 June 2022.

24 July 2022 1	Anderlecht	2–0	Oostende	Anderlecht
18:30	Ashimeru 39'; Silva 88'	Report		Stadium: Lotto Park; Referee: Alexandre Boucaut

30 July 2022 2	Oostende	2–1	Mechelen	Ostend
18:15	Atanga 17', 43'	Report	Peyre 75'	Stadium: Diaz Arena; Referee: Wim Smet

6 August 2022 3	Charleroi	1–3	Oostende	Charleroi
18:15 CEST	Nkuba 55'	Report	D'Haese 28'; Bätzner 66'; Ndicka 90+6'	Stadium: Stade du Pays de Charleroi; Referee: Kevin Van Damme

12 August 2022 4	Oostende	1–3	Gent	Ostend
20:45 CEST (UTC+2)	Atanga 13'	Report	Cuypers 24'; Hong 29'; Hjulsager 60'	Stadium: Diaz Arena; Attendance: 4,568; Referee: Jonathan Lardot

20 August 2022 5	Oostende	0–1	Sint-Truiden	Ostend
16:00		Report	Leistner 17'	Stadium: Diaz Arena; Referee: Brent Staessens

27 August 2022 6	OH Leuven	2–1	Oostende	Leuven
18:15	González 51'; Maertens 90'	Report	Hornby 5'	Stadium: Den Dreef; Referee: Alexandre Boucaut

3 September 2022 7	Standard Liège	1–0	Oostende	Liège
20:45	Drăguș 67'	Report		Stadium: Stade Maurice Dufrasne; Referee: Bram Van Driessche

10 September 2022 8	Oostende	1–0	Eupen	Ostend
18:15 CEST	Bätzner 51'	Report		Stadium: Diaz Arena; Referee: Nathan Verboomen

17 September 2022 9	Cercle Brugge	2–2	Oostende	Bruges
18:15 CEST	Denkey 38'; Ueda 44'	Report	Ambrose 76', 82' (pen.)	Stadium: Jan Breydel Stadium

1 October 2022 10	Oostende	1–2	Genk	Ostend
18:15 CEST	Hornby 3'	Report	Onuachu 25'; Muñoz 88'	Stadium: Diaz Arena; Attendance: 3,878; Referee: Wesli De Cremer

8 October 2022 11	Seraing	1–1	Oostende	Seraing
18:15	Mouandilmadji 55' (pen.)	Report	Medley 90+1'	Stadium: Stade du Pairay; Referee: Arthur Denil

16 October 2022 12	Oostende	1–6	Union SG	Ostend
21:00	Ambrose 89'	Report	Vanzeir 12', 31'; Sykes 63'; Adingra 78'; Boniface 90+1'; Puertas 90+3'	Stadium: Diaz Arena; Referee: Alexandre Boucaut

20 October 2022 13	Antwerp	3–0	Oostende	Antwerp
18:30	De Laet 3'; Ekkelenkamp 52'; Frey 79'	Report		Stadium: Bosuilstadion; Referee: Bert Put

23 October 2022 14	Oostende	2–1	Zulte Waregem	Ostend
21:00	Boonen 45+1'; Atanga 80'	Report	Vossen 70'	Stadium: Diaz Arena; Referee: Jan Boterberg

29 October 2022 15	Club Brugge	4–2	Oostende	Bruges
20:45	Vanaken 34'; Jutglà 39'; Nielsen 73'; Katelaris 80' (o.g.)	Report	Hornby 57', 65' (pen.)	Stadium: Jan Breydel Stadium; Referee: Brent Staessens

6 November 2022 16	Oostende	3–1	Kortrijk	Ostend
21:00	Hornby 8'; McGeehan 54', 90+6'	Report	Bruno 19'	Stadium: Diaz Arena; Referee: Wim Smet

12 November 2022 17	Westerlo	6–0	Oostende	Westerlo
16:00	Nene 16'; Dierckx 28'; Chadli 40' (pen.); Foster 49', 53'; Akbunar 81'	Report		Stadium: Het Kuipje; Referee: Nicolas Laforge

26 December 2022 18	Union SG	3–0	Oostende	Forest
16:00	Teuma 51' (pen.); Adingra 63'; Vanzeir 90+5'	Report		Stadium: Joseph Marien Stadium; Referee: Arthur Denil

7 January 2023 19	Oostende	1–2	Seraing	Ostend
18:15	Bätzner 2'	Report	Mvoué 44'; Vagner 75'	Stadium: Diaz Arena; Referee: Nicolas Laforge

14 January 2023 20	Mechelen	2–1	Oostende	Mechelen
18:15	Da Cruz 40'; Bates 70'	Report	Bätzner 63'	Stadium: Achter de Kazerne; Referee: Jan Boterberg

18 January 2023 21	Oostende	0–3	Antwerp	Ostend
18:30		Report	Muja 11'; Janssen 21'; Nsimba 88'	Stadium: Diaz Arena; Referee: Wim Smet

21 January 2023 22	Oostende	1–2	Cercle Brugge	Ostend
18:15 CEST	Ambrose 66' (pen.)	Report	Ueda 24'; Hotić 90+1'	Stadium: Diaz Arena; Referee: Lawrence Visser

28 January 2023 23	Kortrijk	2–2	Oostende	Kortrijk
18:15	Selemani 20'; Guèye 89'	Report	Bätzner 45+5'; Ambrose 84'	Stadium: Guldensporen Stadion; Referee: Alexandre Boucaut

3 February 2023 24	Oostende	0–2	Anderlecht	Ostend
20:45		Report	Murillo 31'; Dreyer 89'	Stadium: Diaz Arena; Referee: Wesli De Cremer

12 February 2023 25	Zulte Waregem	1–1	Oostende	Waregem
19:15	Gano 5'	Report	Hornby 75'	Stadium: Elindus Arena; Referee: Nicolas Laforge

18 February 2023 26	Oostende	0–0	Charleroi	Ostend
18:15 CEST		Report		Stadium: Diaz Arena; Referee: Arthur Denil

25 February 2023 27	Genk	3–0	Oostende	Genk
18:15 CEST	Muñoz 9'; Samatta 40'; Paintsil 73'	Report		Stadium: Cegeka Arena; Attendance: 16,287; Referee: Jasper Vergoote

3 March 2023 28	Oostende	3–0	Club Brugge	Ostend
20:45	Ambrose 44'; McGeehan 58'; Atanga 90+5'	Report		Stadium: Diaz Arena; Referee: Wesli De Cremer

11 March 2023 29	Eupen	4–4	Oostende	Eupen
18:15 CEST	Gassama 45+3'; Prevljak 59'; Lambert 76'; Charles-Cook 84'	Report	Ambrose 13' (pen.); Ndicka 56'; Hornby 61'; Rodin 90+7'	Stadium: Kehrwegstadion; Referee: Lothar D'hondt

18 March 2023 30	Oostende	1–2	Westerlo	Ostend
18:15	McGeehan 81'	Report	Vaesen 11'; Van Eenoo 90+2'	Stadium: Diaz Arena; Referee: Nicolas Laforge

1 April 2023 31	Oostende	1–3	Standard Liège	Ostend
20:45	Arase 40'	Report	Ohio 8', 11'; Fossey 19'	Stadium: Diaz Arena; Referee: Kevin Van Damme

9 April 2023 32	Sint-Truiden	5–0	Oostende	Sint-Truiden
19:15	Teixeira 11'; Bruno 43' (pen.), 78'; Reitz 62'; Dumont 88'	Report		Stadium: Stayen; Referee: Wesli De Cremer

15 April 2023 33	Oostende	0–4	OH Leuven	Ostend
18:15		Report	Schrijvers 22'; Opoku 44'; Þorsteinsson 58' (pen.); Nsingi 88'	Stadium: Diaz Arena; Referee: Jonathan Lardot

23 April 2023 34	Gent	1–2	Oostende	Ghent
18:30 CEST (UTC+2)	Cuypers 77'	Report	Hornby 52'; Bätzner 88'	Stadium: Ghelamco Arena; Referee: Lawrence Visser

=== Belgian Cup ===
9 November 2022 Sixth round	Thes Sport	1–4	Oostende	Tessenderlo
20:00 CET	Vanaken 81'	Report	Ambrose 56'; Atanga 64'; Bätzner 77'; Berte 88'	Stadium: Sportcentrum Tessenderlo; Referee: Theophile Diskeuve

20 December 2022 Seventh round	Union SG	2–1	Oostende	Forest
20:00 CET	Boniface 11'; Adingra 84'	Report	Ndicka 17'	Stadium: Joseph Marien Stadium; Referee: Kevin Van Damme
