= Warren Bondo =

Footballer (born 2003)

Personal information
- Full name: Warren Pierre Bondo
- Date of birth: 15 September 2003 (age 23)
- Place of birth: Évry, France
- Height: 1.77 m (5 ft 10 in)
- Position: Central midfielder

Team information
- Current team: AC Milan

Youth career
- 2010–2011: Corbeil-Essones
- 2011–2012: Viry-Châtillon
- 2012–2018: Brétigny
- 2018–2020: Nancy

Senior career*
Years	Team	Apps	(Gls)
2020–2022	Nancy II	11	(1)
2020–2022	Nancy	34	(2)
2022–2025	Monza	49	(1)
2023	→ Reggina (loan)	3	(0)
2025–	AC Milan	4	(0)
2025–2026	→ Cremonese (loan)	27	(0)

International career
2019	France U16	2	(0)
2019–2020	France U17	6	(0)
2021–2022	France U19	16	(1)
2022–2023	France U20	8	(0)
- * Club domestic league appearances and goals as of 25 May 2026

Warren Pierre Bondo (born 15 September 2003) is a professional footballer who plays as a central midfielder for Serie A club AC Milan. Born in France, he chose to represent DR Congo at senior level internationally.

== Club career ==
=== Early life and Nancy ===
Born in Évry, France, Bondo began playing football at VESC 91, aged four. He then played for Corbeil-Essonnes, Viry-Châtillon and Brétigny, before being scouted by Nancy, whom he joined in 2018.

In August 2019, Bondo signed his first professional contract with the club, thus becoming Nancy's youngest player ever to do so. He made his professional debut on 24 November 2020, coming in as a substitute for Dorian Bertrand in the 73rd minute of a 1–0 Ligue 2 defeat against Grenoble; however, he was sent off 14 minutes later. On 22 December of the same year, the midfielder scored his first professional goal, as he opened the score of a league match against Chambly, which ultimately ended in a 3–3 draw.

On 10 June 2022, Bondo announced his departure from Nancy, after deciding not to extend his contract, following the club's relegation to Championnat National.

=== Monza ===
On 28 July 2022, Bondo joined newly-promoted Serie A side Monza on a free transfer, signing a three-year contract in the process. He then made his Serie A debut on 30 August, coming in as a substitute for Stefano Sensi at the 85th minute of a 3–0 away defeat to Roma.

On 31 January 2023, Bondo moved to Serie B club Reggina on a six-month loan. He played three games.

Having returned to Monza at the end of his loan, Bondo scored his first Serie A goal on 18 February 2024, a long-distance shot in a 4–2 win against AC Milan.

=== AC Milan ===
On 3 February 2025, Bondo joined AC Milan by signing a contract until 2029.

==== Loan to Cremonese ====
On 12 August 2025, Bondo signed a one-year loan contract with recently-promoted Serie A side Cremonese, for the 2025–26 season.

== International career ==
Born in France, Bondo could also choose to represent DR Congo or Congo Republic internationally, due to his family's origins. He has represented his native country at several youth international levels.

In June 2022, Bondo was included in the France national under-19 team that took part in the UEFA European Under-19 Championship, where the Bleuets reached the semi-finals before losing to eventual runners-up Israel.

He was nominated for the DR Congo national team preliminary squad ahead of the 2025 Africa Cup of Nations.

== Personal life ==
Bondo's father is from the DR Congo, while his mother is from the Congo Republic.

== Career statistics ==
As of match played 24 May 2026

Appearances and goals by club, season and competition
Club	Season	League			National cup (Note: Includes Coupe de France, Coppa Italia)		Total	
Club	Season	Division	Apps	Goals	Apps	Goals	Apps	Goals
Nancy II	2020–21	National 3	6	1	—		6	1
Nancy II	2021–22	National 3	5	0	—		5	0
Nancy II	Total		11	1	0	0	11	1
Nancy	2020–21	Ligue 2	13	1	1	0	14	1
Nancy	2021–22	Ligue 2	21	1	4	0	25	1
Nancy	Total		34	2	5	0	39	2
Monza	2022–23	Serie A	4	0	1	0	5	0
Monza	2023–24	Serie A	25	1	0	0	25	1
Monza	2024–25	Serie A	20	0	2	0	22	0
Monza	Total		49	1	3	0	52	1
Reggina (loan)	2022–23	Serie B	3	0	0	0	3	0
AC Milan	2024–25	Serie A	4	0	1	0	5	0
Cremonese (loan)	2025–26	Serie A	27	0	1	0	28	0
Career total			128	4	10	0	138	4
