= Diongue =

Diongue is a surname. Notable people with the surname include:

- De-arra Sylla Diongue (born 2001), French-Senegalese singer
- Maguette Diongue (born 1992), French football midfielder
- Ndèye Binta Diongue (born 1988), Senegalese épée fencer
