= Nathan Trott =

Bermudian-English footballer (born 1998)

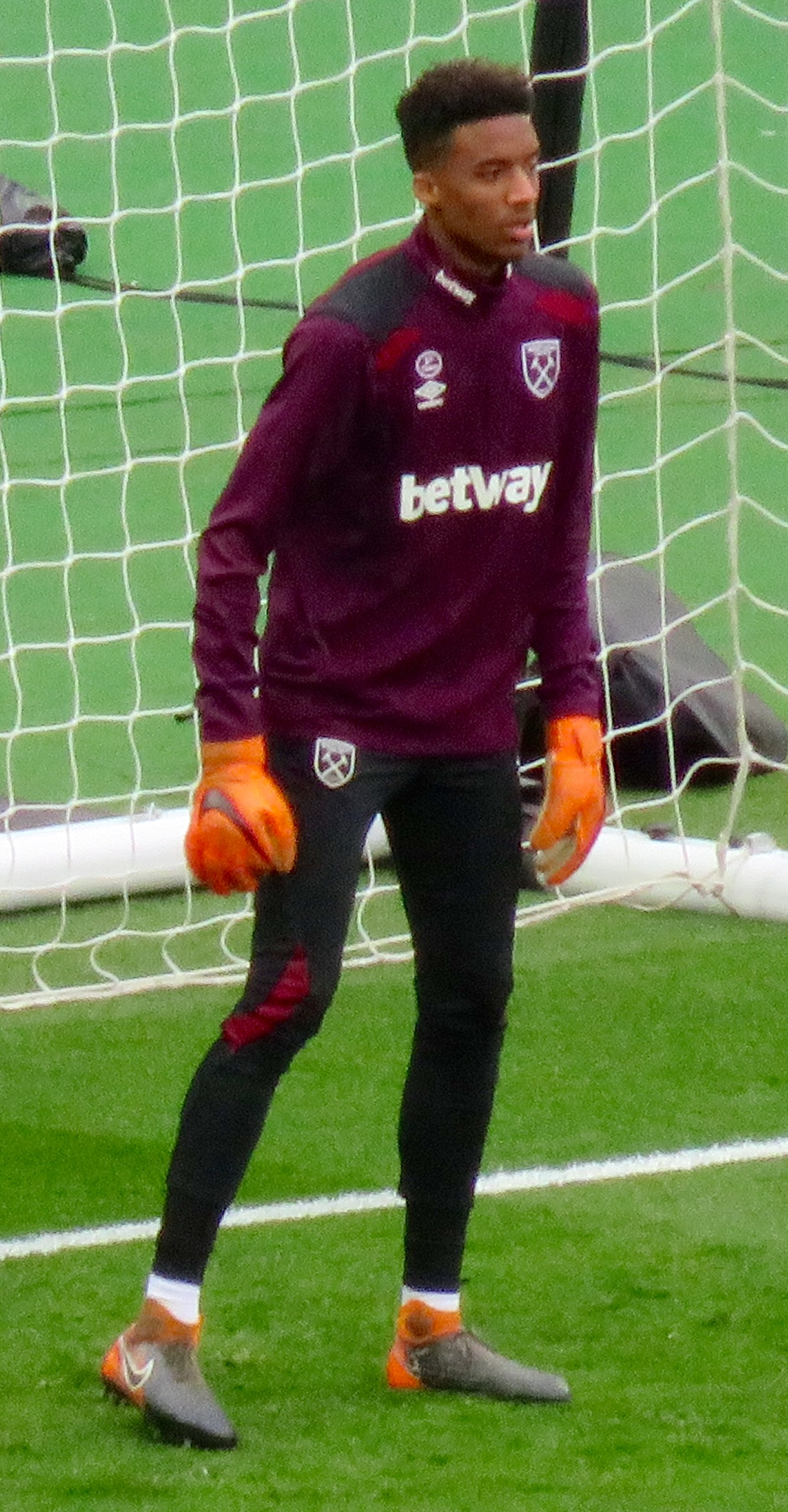
- Trott with West Ham United in 2018

Personal information
- Full name: Nathan Wallace Newman Trott
- Date of birth: 21 November 1998 (age 28)
- Place of birth: Bermuda
- Height: 1.88 m (6 ft 2 in)
- Position: Goalkeeper

Team information
- Current team: Cardiff City
- Number: 1

Youth career
- Valencia
- 2015–2016: North Village Rams
- 2016–2019: West Ham United

Senior career*
Years	Team	Apps	(Gls)
2019–2024	West Ham United	0	(0)
2019–2020	→ AFC Wimbledon (loan)	23	(0)
2021–2022	→ Nancy (loan)	22	(0)
2021–2022	→ Nancy II (loan)	1	(0)
2022–2024	→ Vejle (loan)	51	(0)
2024–2026	Copenhagen	17	(0)
2025–2026	→ Cardiff City (loan)	41	(0)
2026–	Cardiff City	16	(0)

International career
- Bermuda U15
- Bermuda U17
2017–2018	England U20	6	(0)
Medal record
Men's football
Representing England
UEFA European Under-19 Championship
Winner	2017 Georgia	Team
- * Club domestic league appearances and goals as of 09:12, 22 November 2026 (UTC)

Nathan Wallace Newman Trott (born 21 November 1998) is a professional footballer who plays as a goalkeeper for EFL Championship club Cardiff City. Born in Bermuda, he has represented both Bermuda and England at youth international level.

== Club career ==
Born in Bermuda, Trott joined Valencia's academy in Spain as an outfield player, after being spotted at a satellite academy run by Valencia at Saltus Grammar School. Trott transitioned to a goalkeeper on international duty with Bermuda under-15's after an injury to Ajai Daniels. Upon his return to Bermuda, Trott joined North Village Rams. In January 2016, Trott joined West Ham United on the recommendation of Clyde Best, and he signed a new four-year contract with the club in March 2019.

Trott moved on loan to AFC Wimbledon in June 2019. He made his debut on 17 August in a 1–1 home draw with Accrington Stanley.

On 23 January 2021, Trott made his debut, as a substitute, for West Ham in a 4–0 FA Cup win against Doncaster Rovers.

In July 2021, he moved on loan to French club Nancy. In August 2022, he moved on loan to Danish club Vejle. In June 2023, his loan deal was extended for another year.

On 22 June 2024, Trott joined Danish club Copenhagen for an undisclosed fee, signing a four-year contract. He made his debut for the club in the opening game of the season against Lyngby Boldklub and kept a clean sheet, in a 2-0 win. After the match, manager Jacob Neestrup praised his debut performance.

On 6 August 2025, Trott joined EFL League One club Cardiff City on loan. The deal was made permanent at the end of the season, after Trott signed a three-year contract which started on 1 July 2026.

== International career ==
Trott has represented England at U20 level, being a squad member at the 2017 UEFA European Under-19 Championship.

On 30 August 2019, Trott was included in the England U21 squad for the first time.

== Career statistics ==
As of match played 21 November 2026

Appearances and goals by club, season and competition
Club	Season	League			National cup		League cup		Other		Total	
Club	Season	Division	Apps	Goals	Apps	Goals	Apps	Goals	Apps	Goals	Apps	Goals
West Ham United U21	2017–2018	—			—		—		4 (Note: Appearances in EFL Trophy)	0	4	0
West Ham United U21	2018–2019	—			—		—		2	0	2	0
West Ham United U21	2019–2020	—			—		—		0	0	0	0
West Ham United U21	2020–2021	—			—		—		2	0	2	0
West Ham United U21	Total		—		—		—		8	0	8	0
West Ham United	2019–20	Premier League	0	0	0	0	0	0	—		0	0
West Ham United	2020–21	Premier League	0	0	1	0	0	0	—		1	0
West Ham United	2021–22	Premier League	0	0	0	0	0	0	0	0	0	0
West Ham United	2022–23	Premier League	0	0	0	0	0	0	0	0	0	0
West Ham United	Total		0	0	1	0	0	0	0	0	1	0
AFC Wimbledon (loan)	2019–20	League One	23	0	2	0	0	0	1	0	26	0
Nancy (loan)	2021–22	Ligue 2	22	0	1	0	—		—		23	0
Nancy II (loan)	2021–22	Championnat National 3	1	0	—		—		—		1	0
Vejle (loan)	2022–23	Danish 1st Division	20	0	5	0	—		—		25	0
Vejle (loan)	2023–24	Danish Superliga	31	0	0	0	—		—		31	0
Vejle (loan)	Total		51	0	5	0	0	0	0	0	56	0
Copenhagen	2024–25	Danish Superliga	17	0	2	0	10 (Note: Appearances in UEFA Conference League)	0	0	0	29	0
Copenhagen	2025–26	Danish Superliga	0	0	0	0	0	0	0	0	0	0
Copenhagen	Total		17	0	2	0	10	0	0	0	29	0
Cardiff City (loan)	2025–26	League One	41	0	1	0	4	0	0	0	46	0
Cardiff City	2026–27	Championship	16	0	0	0	2	0	0	0	18	0
Career total			171	0	12	0	16	0	9	0	208	0

== Honours ==
Vejle Boldklub

- Danish 1st Division: 2022–23

Copenhagen

- Danish Superliga: 2024–25
- Danish Cup: 2024–25

England U19

- UEFA European Under-19 Championship: 2017
