= Julien Le Cardinal =

French footballer (born 1997)

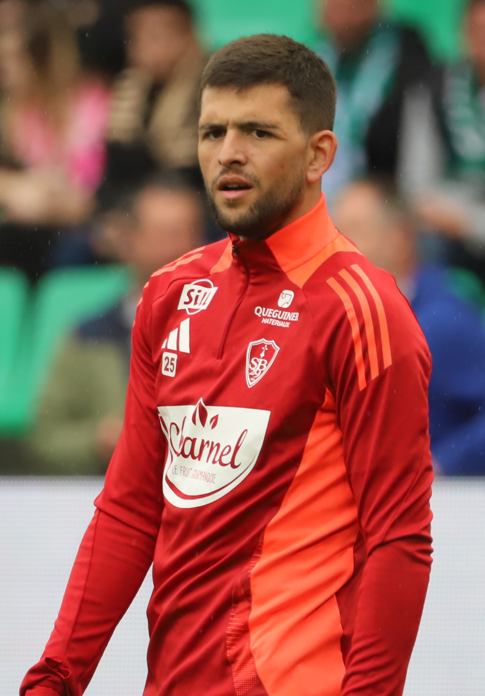
- Le Cardinal with Brest in 2025

Personal information
- Full name: Julien Le Cardinal
- Date of birth: 3 August 1997 (age 29)
- Place of birth: Saint-Brieuc, France
- Height: 1.82 m (6 ft 0 in)
- Position: Centre-back

Team information
- Current team: Saint-Étienne
- Number: 26

Youth career
- –2015: Guingamp

Senior career*
Years	Team	Apps	(Gls)
2015–2019	Stade Briochin	52	(4)
2019–2022	Bastia	74	(6)
2022	Paris FC	13	(1)
2022–2024	Lens	10	(0)
2023–2024	Lens B	1	(0)
2023–2024	→ Brest (loan)	12	(0)
2024–2026	Brest	21	(1)
2026–	Saint-Étienne	11	(1)
- * Club domestic league appearances and goals as of 11 May 2026

Julien Le Cardinal (born 3 August 1997) is a French professional footballer who plays as a centre-back for Ligue 2 club Saint-Étienne.

== Career ==
Julien Le Cardinal made his first appearances in Ligue 2 with Bastia in 2019.

On 15 November 2022, Le Cardinal signed for Ligue 1 club Lens on a contract until 2025. The transfer fee paid to Paris FC was reportedly of €2.3 million, with an additional €300,000 in bonuses. Lens had signed Le Cardinal in a "joker" transfer, a type of transfer allowed by the Ligue de Football Professionnel outside the regular transfer window dates. He was given the number 25 jersey.

On 1 July 2024, Le Cardinal signed for Ligue 1 club Brest on a permanent transfer after he had been on loan during the season. Media reports quoted a transfer fee of €1.7 million.

On 2 February 2026, Le Cardinal moved to Saint-Étienne in Ligue 2.

== Career statistics ==
As of match played 10 December 2024

Appearances and goals by club, season and competition
Club	Season	League			Coupe de France		Europe		Total	
Club	Season	Division	Apps	Goals	Apps	Goals	Apps	Goals	Apps	Goals
Stade Briochin	2015–16	CFA 2	2	0	0	0	—		2	0
Stade Briochin	2016–17	CFA 2	6	0	0	0	—		6	0
Stade Briochin	2017–18	National 2	16	1	2	0	—		18	1
Stade Briochin	2018–19	National 2	28	3	0	0	—		28	3
Stade Briochin	Total		52	4	2	0	—		46	4
Bastia	2019–20	National 2	19	3	0	0	—		19	3
Bastia	2020–21	National	24	1	0	0	—		24	1
Bastia	2021–22	Ligue 2	31	2	4	1	—		35	3
Bastia	Total		74	6	4	1	—		78	7
Paris FC	2022–23	Ligue 2	13	1	0	0	—		13	1
Lens	2022–23	Ligue 1	8	0	3	0	—		11	0
Lens	2023–24	Ligue 1	2	0	0	0	—		2	0
Lens	Total		10	0	3	0	—		13	0
Lens B	2022–23	National 3	1	0	—		—		1	0
Brest (loan)	2023–24	Ligue 1	12	0	3	0	—		15	0
Brest	2024–25	Ligue 1	9	0	0	0	3 (Note: Appearances in UEFA Champions League)	1	12	1
Career total			171	11	12	1	3	1	186	12

== Honours ==
Stade Briochin

- Championnat de France Amateur 2: 2016–17

Bastia

- Championnat National: 2020–21
