= Nick Bätzner =

German footballer (born 2000)

Personal information
- Date of birth: 15 March 2000 (age 26)
- Place of birth: Ludwigsburg, Germany
- Height: 1.70 m (5 ft 7 in)
- Position: Attacking midfielder

Team information
- Current team: Rot-Weiss Essen
- Number: 25

Youth career
- 2012–2018: VfB Stuttgart

Senior career*
Years	Team	Apps	(Gls)
2018–2020	VfB Stuttgart II	22	(4)
2020–2023	Oostende	84	(9)
2023–2025	Wehen Wiesbaden	55	(4)
2025–2026	SC Paderborn	30	(2)
2026–	Rot-Weiss Essen	0	(0)

International career^{‡}
2017–2018	Germany U18	5	(0)
2018	Germany U19	1	(0)
2021	Germany U21	2	(0)
- * Club domestic league appearances and goals as of 29 August 2026 ‡ National team caps and goals as of 16 November 2021

Nick Bätzner (born 15 March 2000) is a German professional footballer who plays as an attacking midfielder for 3. Liga club Rot-Weiss Essen.

== Club career ==
A youth product of VfB Stuttgart since the age of 12, Bätzner signed with Oostende in the summer of 2020. He made his professional debut with Oostende in a 2–2 Belgian First Division A tie with Genk on 28 September 2020.

On 22 May 2025, Bätzner signed a contract with SC Paderborn.

== Career statistics ==
As of match played on 25 May 2026

Appearances and goals by club, season and competition
Club	Season	League			National cup		Continental		Other		Total	
Club	Season	Division	Apps	Goals	Apps	Goals	Apps	Goals	Apps	Goals	Apps	Goals
VfB Stuttgart II	2018–19	Regionalliga	1	0	—		—		—		1	0
VfB Stuttgart II	2019–20	Oberliga	21	4	0	0	—		4 (Note: Appearances in the Württemberg Cup)	1	25	5
VfB Stuttgart II	Total		22	4	0	0	—		4	1	26	5
Oostende	2020–21	Belgian First Division A	24	1	2	1	—		—		26	2
Oostende	2021–22	Belgian First Division A	30	2	2	0	—		—		32	2
Oostende	2022–23	Belgian Pro League	30	6	2	1	—		—		32	7
Oostende	Total		84	9	6	2	—		—		90	11
Wehen Wiesbaden	2023–24	2. Bundesliga	24	1	1	0	—		1 (Note: Appearances in relegation play-offs)	0	26	1
Wehen Wiesbaden	2024–25	3. Liga	31	3	1	0	—		4 (Note: Appearances in Hessian Cup)	1	36	4
Wehen Wiesbaden	Total		55	4	2	0	—		5	1	62	5
Paderborn 07	2025–26	2. Bundesliga	30	2	2	0	—		2 (Note: Appearances in promotion play-offs)	0	34	2
Paderborn 07	2026–27	Bundesliga	0	0	0	0	—		—		0	0
Paderborn 07	Total		30	2	2	0	—		2	0	34	2
Career total			191	19	10	2	0	0	11	2	212	23
