= Stephen Quemper =

French footballer (born 1993)

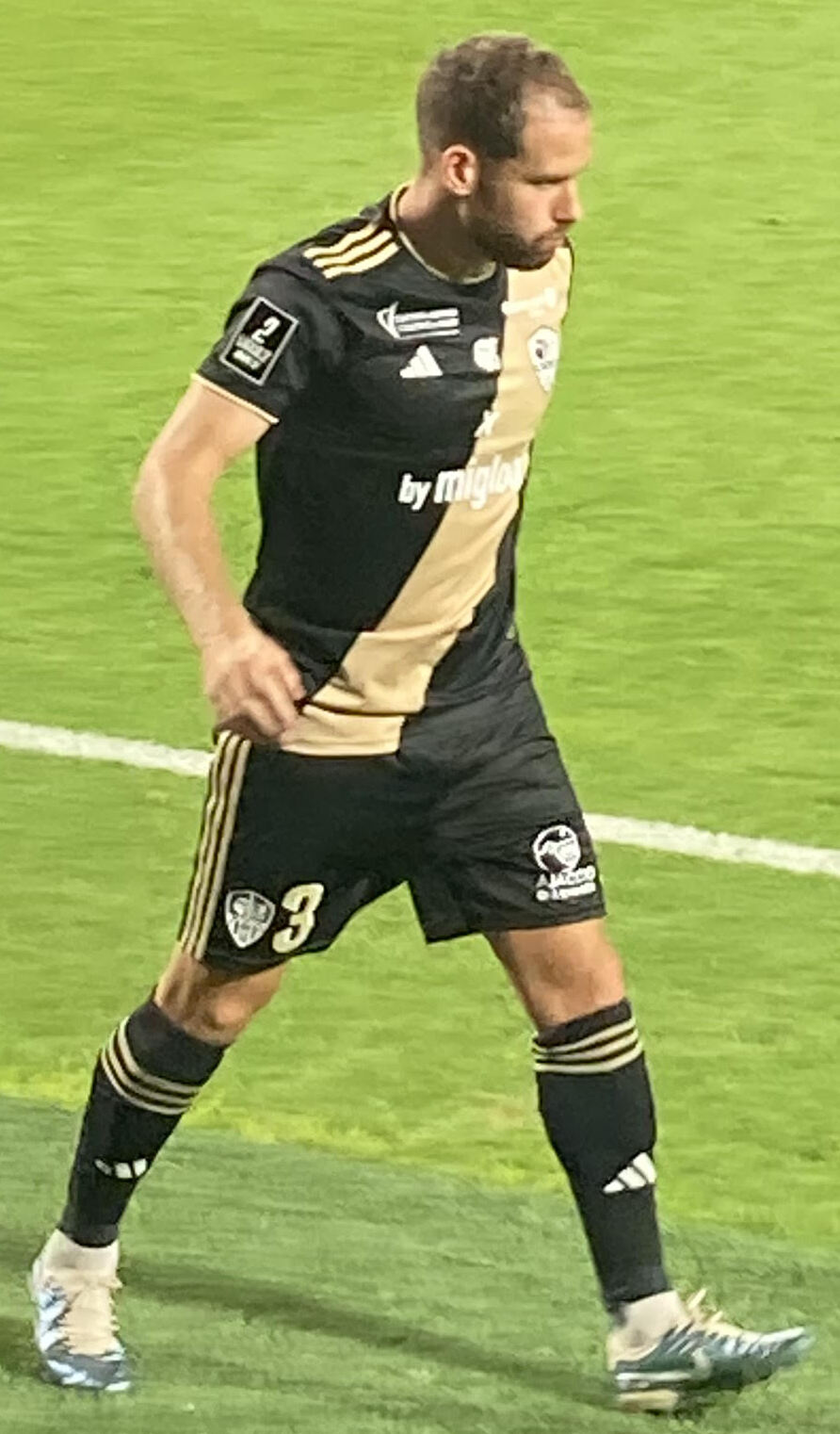
- Quemper with Ajaccio in 2024

Personal information
- Date of birth: 12 May 1993 (age 33)
- Place of birth: Morlaix, France
- Height: 1.78 m (5 ft 10 in)
- Position: Left-back

Team information
- Current team: Créteil

Youth career
- 2003–2006: Guingamp
- 2006–2013: Morlaix

Senior career*
Years	Team	Apps	(Gls)
2013–2014	Concarneau	18	(1)
2014–2019	Stade Briochin	113	(15)
2019–2022	Bastia	64	(1)
2022–2023	Guingamp	39	(1)
2023–2025	Ajaccio	30	(0)
2025–	Créteil	0	(0)
- * Club domestic league appearances and goals as of 10 May 2025

Stephen Quemper (born 12 May 1993) is a French professional footballer who plays as a left-back for Championnat National 1 club Créteil.

== Career ==
A youth product of Guingamp and Morlaix, Quemper began his senior career with Concarneau. He spent his early career in the semi-pro French leagues with from 2015 to 2019, before transferring to SC Bastia. He made his professional debut with Bastia in a 1–1 Ligue 2 tie with Nancy on 11 August 2021.

On 10 January 2022, he returned to his first club Guingamp. After one season of his three-year contract with Guingamp, he requested to leave, and on 21 July 2023 he signed for fellow Ligue 2 side AC Ajaccio.

Following Ajaccio's relegation from Ligue 2, on 8 July 2025 Quemper signed with Créteil in the fourth-tier Championnat National 2.

== Career statistics ==
As of match played on 17 March 2025

Club statistics
Club	Season	League			National Cup		Continental		Other		Total	
Club	Season	Division	Apps	Goals	Apps	Goals	Apps	Goals	Apps	Goals	Apps	Goals
Concarneau	2013–14	Championnat de France Amateur	18	1	1	0	—		—		19	1
Stade Briochin	2014–15	Championnat de France Amateur 2	24	3	0	0	—		—		24	3
Stade Briochin	2015–16	Championnat de France Amateur 2	24	1	2	1	—		—		26	2
Stade Briochin	2016–17	Championnat de France Amateur 2	25	4	1	0	—		—		26	4
Stade Briochin	2017–18	Championnat National 2	12	2	0	0	—		—		12	2
Stade Briochin	2018–19	Championnat National 2	28	5	0	0	—		—		28	5
Stade Briochin	Total		113	15	3	1	0	0	0	0	126	16
SC Bastia	2019–20	Championnat National 2	17	1	0	0	—		—		17	1
SC Bastia	2020–21	Championnat National	30	0	0	0	—		—		30	0
SC Bastia	2021–22	Ligue 2	17	0	4	0	—		—		21	0
SC Bastia	Total		64	1	4	0	0	0	0	0	68	1
Guingamp	2021–22	Ligue 2	17	0	0	0	—		—		17	0
Guingamp	2022–23	Ligue 2	22	1	2	0	—		—		24	1
Guingamp	Total		39	1	2	0	0	0	0	0	41	1
Ajaccio	2023–24	Ligue 2	25	0	2	0	—		—		27	0
Ajaccio	2024–25	Ligue 2	5	0	0	0	—		—		5	0
Ajaccio	Total		30	0	2	0	0	0	0	0	32	0
Career totals			264	19	12	1	0	0	0	0	276	19
