= Indy Boonen =

Belgian footballer (born 1999)

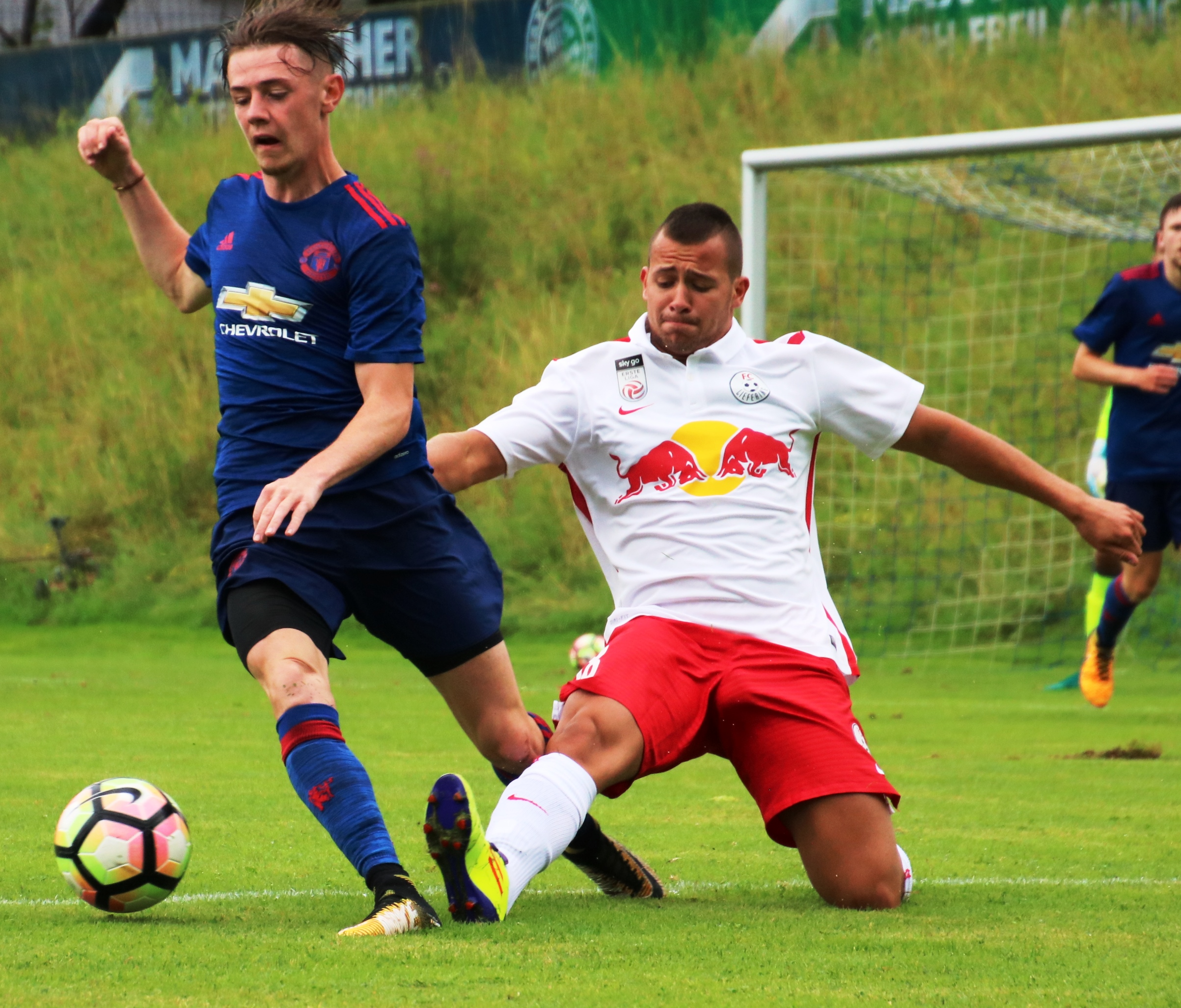
- Indy Boonen playing for Manchester United against FC Liefering on 11 July 2017.

Personal information
- Full name: Indy Zeb Boonen
- Date of birth: January 4, 1999 (age 27)
- Place of birth: Dilsen-Stokkem, Belgium
- Height: 1.77 m (5 ft 10 in)
- Position: Winger

Team information
- Current team: Radnik Bijeljina
- Number: 7

Youth career
- 2006–2015: Genk
- 2015–2018: Manchester United

Senior career*
Years	Team	Apps	(Gls)
2018–2023	Oostende	68	(6)
2024	Panachaiki	4	(0)
2024–2026	Lokeren	51	(4)
2026–	Radnik Bijeljina	9	(0)

International career
2016	Belgium U17	4	(0)
2017	Belgium U18	1	(0)
2017–2018	Belgium U19	8	(2)
- * Club domestic league appearances and goals as of 31 October 2026

Indy Zeb Boonen (born 4 January 1999) is a Belgian professional footballer who plays as a winger for Bosnian Premier League club Radnik Bijeljina.

== Club career ==
Boonen began his career with Genk but was released in the summer of 2014. He signed a three-year contract with English club Manchester United as a 16-year-old in February 2015. He trained with the first team on occasion, but rejected the club's offer of a new contract in 2018 and left to return to Belgium with K.V. Oostende that June. He made his professional debut for Oostende in a 2–1 Belgian First Division A win over Royal Excel Mouscron on 28 July 2018, coming on as an injury-time substitute for Richairo Živković. He scored his first professional goal in a 1–1 draw away to S.V. Zulte Waregem on 1 December 2018. He finished the season with a total of three goals in 24 league appearances for the club.

Boonen played several months for Super League Greece 2 club Panachaiki during the first half of 2024, making four appearances. In June 2024, he returned to Belgium, signing with Challenger Pro League club Lokeren-Temse on a one-year contract with an option for an additional year.

== Personal life ==
Boonen is the son of former professional footballer Jacky Boonen. His brother Seppe is also a footballer, who most recently played for Patro Eisden. Like Indy, Seppe spent time in Manchester United's youth academy. Seppe began his career as a goalkeeper, but has since changed to being a forward.

== Career statistics ==
As of match played 31 October 2026

Appearances and goals by club, season and competition
Club	Season	League			National cup (Note: Includes Belgian Cup, Greek Cup, Bosnian Cup)		Other		Total	
Club	Season	Division	Apps	Goals	Apps	Goals	Apps	Goals	Apps	Goals
Oostende	2018–19	Belgian First Division A	24	3	4	1	—		28	4
Oostende	2019–20	Belgian First Division A	12	0	1	0	—		13	0
Oostende	2020–21	Belgian First Division A	16	2	1	0	—		17	2
Oostende	2021–22	Belgian First Division A	5	0	—		—		5	0
Oostende	2022–23	Belgian First Division A	11	1	1	0	—		12	1
Oostende	Total		68	6	7	1	—		75	7
Panachaiki	2023–24	Super League Greece 2	4	0	—		—		4	0
Lokeren	2024–25	Challenger Pro League	26	3	2	1	4 (Note: Appearances in the 2024–25 Challenger Pro League promotion play-offs)	0	32	4
Lokeren	2025–26	Challenger Pro League	25	1	—		—		25	1
Lokeren	Total		51	4	2	1	4	0	57	5
Radnik Bijeljina	2026–27	Bosnian Premier League	9	0	1	1	—		10	1
Career total			132	10	10	3	4	0	146	13
