= Mamadou Thiam =

Senegalese footballer (born 1995)

Personal information
- Full name: Mamadou Khady Thiam
- Date of birth: 20 March 1995 (age 31)
- Place of birth: Aubervilliers, France
- Height: 1.80 m (5 ft 11 in)
- Positions: Forward; winger

Team information
- Current team: Sarıyer
- Number: 93

Youth career
- RCF Paris
- Red Star
- –2013: JA Drancy
- 2013–2014: Dijon

Senior career*
| Years | Team | Apps | (Gls) |
| 2013–2015 | Dijon B | 32 | (13) |
| 2015–2017 | Dijon | 25 | (3) |
| 2016–2017 | → Clermont (loan) | 34 | (8) |
| 2017–2020 | Barnsley | 83 | (8) |
| 2020–2022 | Oostende | 16 | (0) |
| 2021–2022 | → Nancy (loan) | 34 | (5) |
| 2022–2023 | Universitatea Cluj | 27 | (9) |
| 2023–2024 | Al-Arabi | | |
| 2024 | Al-Jabalain | 15 | (2) |
| 2024–2025 | Universitatea Cluj | 43 | (11) |
| 2025–2026 | FCSB | 27 | (3) |
| 2026– | Sarıyer | 0 | (0) |

International career
| 2015 | Senegal U20 | 7 | (2) |
- * Club domestic league appearances and goals as of 18 May 2026

Mamadou Khady Thiam (born 20 March 1995) is a professional footballer who plays as a forward for TFF 1. Lig club Sarıyer. Born in France, he represented Senegal at under-20 level.

== Career ==
In August 2017, Thiam joined Barnsley F.C. from Dijon on a three-year deal. He scored his first goal for Barnsley, a penalty, in a 3–1 win at Millwall on 30 September 2017.

On 8 September 2022, Thiam joined the Romanian Liga I club Universitatea Cluj. During the 2022-23 Liga I season, Thiam was the best goalscorer for "U", with 9 goals. In all competitions, Mamadou Thiam scored 11 goals for the Șepcile roșii.

On 31 January 2024, Thiam joined Saudi club Al-Jabalain.

Mamadou Thiam rejoined Universitatea Cluj on 12 June 2024, signing with the Romanian club ahead of the 2024–25 season.

== Career statistics ==
As of 29 May 2026

Appearances and goals by club, season and competition
| Club | Season | League | | | National cup (Note: Includes Coupe de France, FA Cup, Belgian Cup, Cupa României) | | League cup (Note: Includes Coupe de la Ligue, EFL Cup) | | Continental | | Other | | Total | |
| Club | Season | Division | Apps | Goals | Apps | Goals | Apps | Goals | Apps | Goals | Apps | Goals | Apps | Goals |
|---|---|---|---|---|---|---|---|---|---|---|---|---|---|---|
| Dijon B | 2013–14 | CFA 2 | 11 | 2 | — | | — | | — | | — | | 11 | 2 |
| Dijon B | 2014–15 | CFA 2 | 12 | 5 | — | | — | | — | | — | | 12 | 5 |
| Dijon B | 2015–16 | CFA 2 | 9 | 6 | — | | — | | — | | — | | 9 | 6 |
| Dijon B | Total | | 32 | 13 | — | | — | | — | | — | | 32 | 13 |
| Dijon | 2014–15 | Ligue 2 | 8 | 0 | 1 | 0 | 0 | 0 | — | | — | | 9 | 0 |
| Dijon | 2015–16 | Ligue 2 | 17 | 3 | 0 | 0 | 3 | 1 | — | | — | | 20 | 4 |
| Dijon | Total | | 25 | 3 | 1 | 0 | 3 | 1 | — | | — | | 29 | 4 |
| Clermont (loan) | 2016–17 | Ligue 2 | 34 | 8 | 2 | 0 | 3 | 1 | — | | — | | 39 | 9 |
| Barnsley | 2017–18 | Championship | 29 | 1 | 1 | 0 | 1 | 0 | — | | 0 | 0 | 31 | 1 |
| Barnsley | 2018–19 | League One | 46 | 7 | 2 | 0 | 1 | 0 | — | | 3 (Note: Appearances in EFL Trophy) | 0 | 52 | 7 |
| Barnsley | 2019–20 | Championship | 8 | 0 | 0 | 0 | 1 | 0 | — | | 0 | 0 | 9 | 0 |
| Barnsley | Total | | 83 | 8 | 3 | 0 | 3 | 0 | — | | 3 | 0 | 92 | 8 |
| Oostende | 2020–21 | Belgian First Division A | 16 | 0 | 2 | 0 | — | | — | | 5 | 0 | 23 | 0 |
| Nancy (loan) | 2021–22 | Ligue 2 | 34 | 5 | 3 | 0 | — | | — | | — | | 37 | 5 |
| Universitatea Cluj | 2022–23 | Liga I | 27 | 9 | 6 | 2 | — | | — | | — | | 33 | 11 |
| Al-Arabi | 2023–24 | Kuwait Premier League | ? | ? | ? | ? | — | | 4 (Note: Appearances in AFC Champions League Two) | 2 | — | | 4 | 2 |
| Al-Jabalain | 2023–24 | Saudi First Division League | 15 | 2 | — | | — | | — | | — | | 15 | 2 |
| Universitatea Cluj | 2024–25 | Liga I | 38 | 9 | 0 | 0 | — | | — | | — | | 38 | 9 |
| Universitatea Cluj | 2025–26 | Liga I | 5 | 2 | — | | — | | 2 (Note: Appearances in UEFA Conference League) | 0 | — | | 7 | 2 |
| Universitatea Cluj | Total | | 43 | 11 | 0 | 0 | — | | 2 | 0 | — | | 45 | 11 |
| FCSB | 2025–26 | Liga I | 27 | 3 | 3 | 1 | — | | 8 (Note: Appearances in UEFA Europa League) | 1 | 2 (Note: Appearances in Liga I European play-offs) | 0 | 40 | 5 |
| Sarıyer | 2026–27 | TFF 1. Lig | 0 | 0 | 0 | 0 | — | | — | | — | | 0 | 0 |
| Career total | | | 336 | 62 | 20 | 3 | 9 | 2 | 14 | 3 | 10 | 0 | 389 | 70 |

== Honours ==
Universitatea Cluj

- Cupa României runner-up: 2022–23
