= Antony Robic =

French footballer (born 1986)

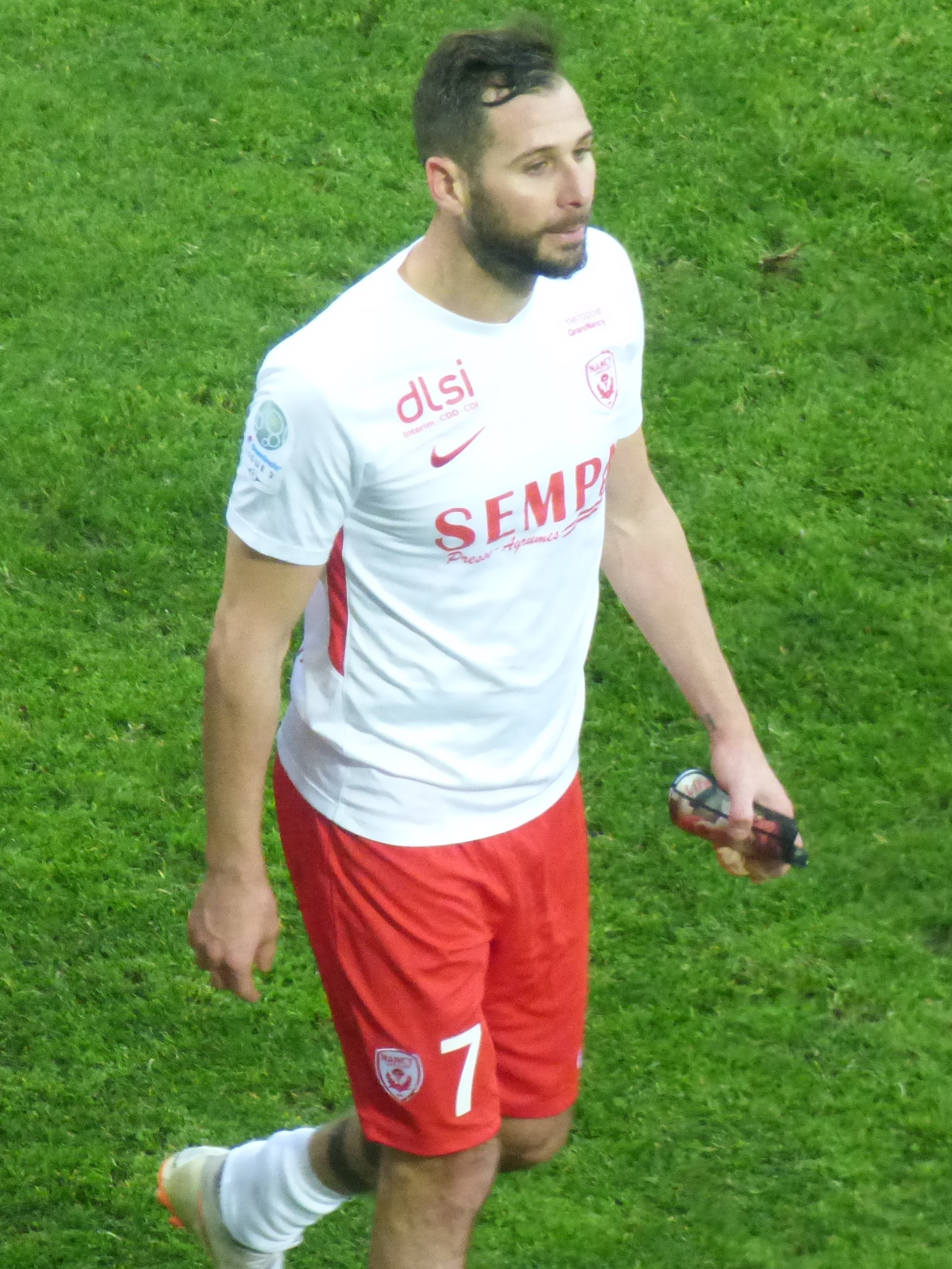
- Robic in 2019

Personal information
- Date of birth: 5 March 1986 (age 40)
- Place of birth: Marseille, France
- Height: 1.81 m (5 ft 11 in)
- Position: Midfielder

Team information
- Current team: Gallia Lucciana

Youth career
- 2003–2007: Toulouse

Senior career*
Years	Team	Apps	(Gls)
2007–2009	Tours	38	(1)
2010	Martigues	10	(1)
2011–2012	Romorantin	28	(10)
2012–2013	Vannes	32	(6)
2013–2015	Laval	74	(8)
2015–2019	Nancy	90	(12)
2019–2020	Laval	34	(14)
2020–2023	Bastia	76	(12)
2023–2024	Borgo	19	(11)
2024–	Gallia Lucciana	9	(6)
- * Club domestic league appearances and goals as of 7 December 2024

Antony Robic (born 5 March 1986) is a French professional footballer who plays for Championnat National 3 club Gallia Lucciana. He has previously played in Ligue 2 with Tours, Laval and Nancy.

== Career ==
In January 2019, Robic moved to Laval of the Championnat National.

In July 2020, he joined Bastia, newly promoted to the Championnat National. The club went on to win the league and achieved successive promotions.

== Personal life ==
Born in France, Robic is of Portuguese descent through his mother. He holds dual French-Portuguese citizenship.

== Career statistics ==
As of 1 July 2023

Appearances and goals by club, season and competition
Club	Season	League			Coupe de France		Coupe de la Ligue		Total	
Club	Season	Division	Apps	Goals	Apps	Goals	Apps	Goals	Apps	Goals
Tours	2007–08	National	30	1	5	1	0	0	35	2
Tours	2008–09	Ligue 2	8	0	3	0	0	0	11	0
Tours	Total		38	1	8	1	0	0	46	2
Martigues	2009–10	CFA Group B	10	1	2	1	0	0	12	2
Romorantin	2011–12	CFA Group D	28	10	4	2	0	0	32	12
Vannes	2012–13	National	32	6	1	0	0	0	33	6
Laval	2013–14	Ligue 2	36	4	1	0	1	0	38	4
Laval	2014–15	Ligue 2	38	4	2	0	1	1	41	5
Laval	Total		74	8	3	0	2	1	79	9
Nancy	2015–16	Ligue 2	32	10	2	1	2	1	36	12
Nancy	2016–17	Ligue 1	24	0	2	1	3	0	29	1
Nancy	2017–18	Ligue 2	23	1	2	2	1	0	26	3
Nancy	2018–19	Ligue 2	11	1	2	0	0	0	13	1
Nancy	Total		90	12	8	4	6	1	104	17
Laval	2018–19	National	12	6	0	0	0	0	12	6
Laval	2019–20	National	22	8	1	0	0	0	23	8
Laval	Total		34	14	1	0	0	0	35	14
Bastia	2020–21	National	30	12	0	0	0	0	30	12
Bastia	2021–22	Ligue 2	30	1	5	2	0	0	35	3
Bastia	2022–23	Ligue 2	16	0	2	0	0	0	18	0
Bastia	Total		76	13	7	2	0	0	83	15
Career total			382	65	34	10	8	2	424	77
