= Yeni Ngbakoto =

Footballer (born 1992)

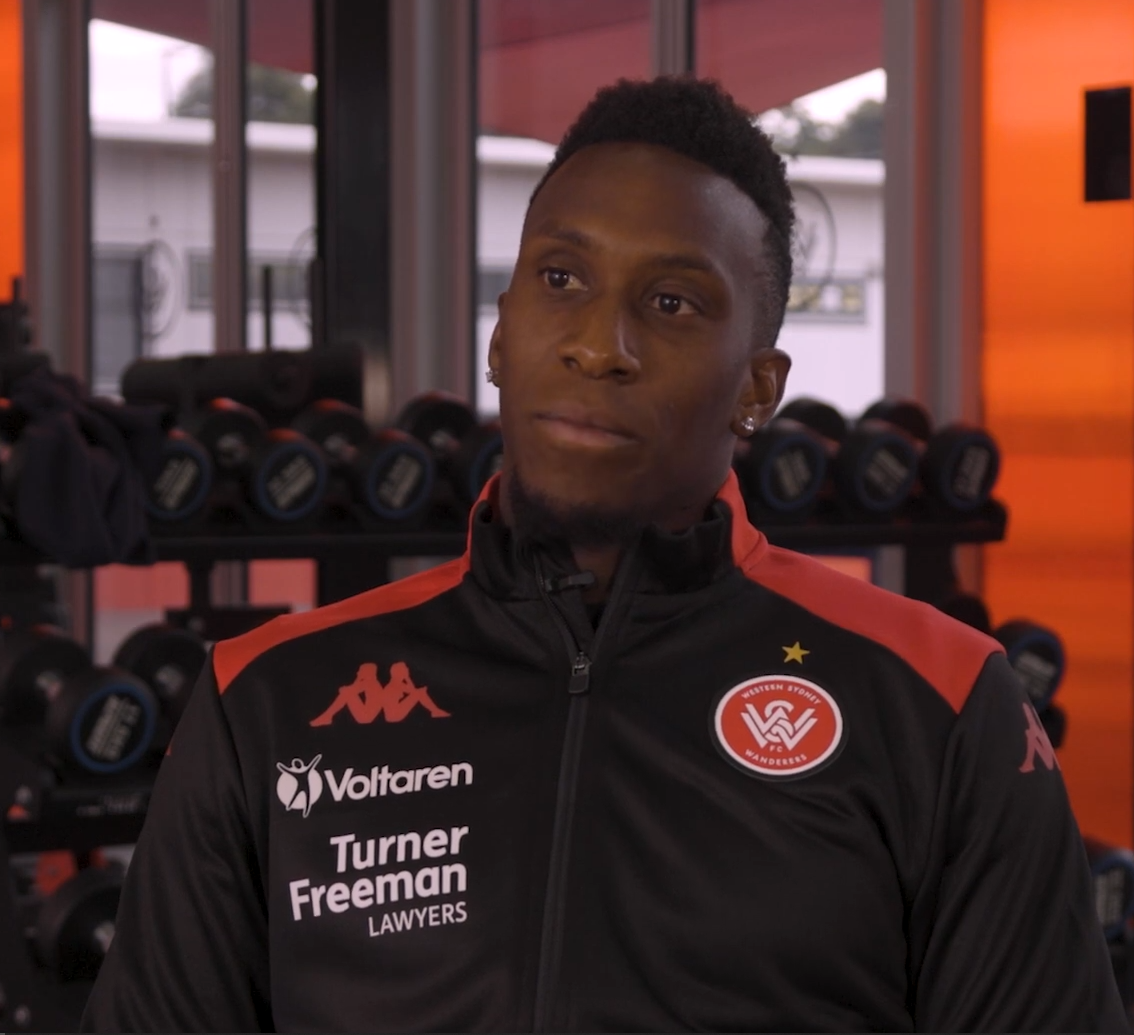
- Ngbakoto with Western Sydney Wanderers in 2022

Personal information
- Full name: Yeni Atito N'Gbakoto
- Date of birth: 23 January 1992 (age 34)
- Place of birth: Croix, France
- Height: 1.73 m (5 ft 8 in)
- Position: Winger

Youth career
- 2001–2007: SCC Besançon
- 2007–2009: Metz

Senior career*
| Years | Team | Apps | (Gls) |
| 2009–2016 | Metz | 185 | (44) |
| 2016–2018 | Queens Park Rangers | 31 | (3) |
| 2018–2021 | Guingamp | 73 | (14) |
| 2021–2022 | Panathinaikos | 14 | (0) |
| 2021 | Panathinaikos B | 2 | (0) |
| 2022 | Nancy | 14 | (3) |
| 2022–2023 | Western Sydney Wanderers | 18 | (4) |
| 2023–2025 | Vejle | 38 | (3) |

International career^{‡}
| 2008–2009 | France U17 | 32 | (6) |
| 2009–2010 | France U18 | 12 | (4) |
| 2017– | DR Congo | 2 | (1) |
- * Club domestic league appearances and goals as of 29 May 2025 ‡ National team caps and goals as of 6 June 2017

Yeni Atito N'Gbakoto (born 23 January 1992) is a professional footballer. Born in France, he plays for the DR Congo national team internationally. He primarily plays as a winger, but is capable of playing as a striker.

He is a former France youth international having earned caps at under-17 and under-18 level.

He is known for his speed, technical ability, and strength, which compensates for his small stature.

== Club career ==
=== Metz ===
Born in Croix, Ngbakoto began his football career at SC Clemenceau in the commune of Besançon. He excelled in the club's youth academy and eventually secured a move to the youth academy of professional club Metz. While at the academy, he developed gracefully becoming one of the club's most sought after products. During his time at the academy, he drew interest from English clubs Chelsea and Tottenham Hotspur and Spanish club Barcelona. Ngbakoto's play with the club's under-16 team saw him earn a call up to the France under-17 team by coach Philippe Bergeroo. On 25 June 2009, he agreed to his first professional contract signing a five-year deal until June 2014. Following the agreement, he was promoted to the senior team and assigned the number 15 shirt in preparation for the 2009–10 season.

Ngbakoto began the season playing on the club's amateur team in the Championnat de France amateur 2, the fifth level of French football, scoring on his debut in the team's opening match against CA Pontarlier on 15 August 2009. He consistently appeared in the amateur team for the next four months, adding another goal in a 1–0 victory over Thionville, before earning a call up to the senior team by manager Yvon Pouliquen for the club's Coupe de la Ligue match against Lyon on 13 January 2010. Ngbakoto made his professional debut in the match appearing as a substitute in the 83rd minute for Julien Cardy. Metz lost the match 3–0. He was relegated back to the amateur division shortly after and finished the campaign with 16 appearances and eight goals as the Metz reserve team were crowned champions of the league finishing with 107 points.

For the 2010–11 season, Ngbakoto was reassigned the number 23 shirt by new manager Dominique Bijotat. He made his league debut on 27 August 2010 in a league match against AC Ajaccio, which ended 0–0. He started the match and played 90 minutes before being substituted out in injury time. On 18 December, he scored his first professional goal in a 3–0 victory over L'Entente SSG in the Coupe de France.

=== Queens Park Rangers ===
Ngbakoto signed for English club Queens Park Rangers on 7 August 2016. He scored on his debut for the club against Swindon Town in an EFL Cup tie on 10 August 2016.

=== Guingamp ===
On 3 January 2018, Ngbakoto signed for French Ligue 1 club Guingamp for an undisclosed fee. He was assigned the number 12 shirt.

=== Panathinaikos ===
On 1 February 2021, Greek club Panathinaikos have signed DR Congo international Yeni Ngbakoto. Ngbakoto, who was born in France but has played twice for his national team, has signed an 18-month deal which according to Greek media will earn him €400 000.

=== Nancy ===
On 31 January 2022, Ngbakoto signed with Nancy in Ligue 2 until the end of the season.

=== Western Sydney Wanderers ===
On 23 June 2022, Ngbakoto joined A-League Men club Western Sydney Wanderers.

In May 2023, it was announced that Ngbakoto was leaving the club at the end of his contract.

=== Vejle Boldklub ===
On 1 September 2023, Ngbakoto joined Danish Superliga club Vejle Boldklub on a deal until June 2025.

== International career ==
Ngbakoto was born in France and is of Congolese and Ivorian descent. Ngbakoto has earned international youth caps with the under-17 and under-18 teams. With the under-17s, he was a regular appearing in 14 matches scoring four goals with his first two coming in a tournament in Austria against Slovakia and the hosts. Ngbakoto scored both his other goals in the qualification process for the 2009 UEFA European Under-17 Football Championship. He scored one in the first qualifying round against Scotland and the other in the Elite Round against Belarus converting a penalty. The team later suffered group stage elimination in the tournament with Ngbakoto appearing in all three matches.

With the under-18s, Ngbakoto earned his first appearance in the yearly SBS Cup, held in Japan, against Mexico. He was one of the few underage players for France at the tournament. In the tournament, he scored his only two goals so far against the Shizuoka national team in the second group stage match and the hosts Japan in the final group stage match.

Ngbakoto was called up to the DR Congo national team in March 2017, eligible through heritage. He made his first appearance in a 2–1 friendly loss to Kenya on 26 March 2017.

== Career statistics ==
=== Club ===
As of match played 12 November 2023

Appearances and goals by club, season and competition
| Club | Season | League | | | Cup | | Australia (Note: Appearance in the 2022–23 A-League Men finals series.) | | Total | |
| Club | Season | Division | Apps | Goals | Apps | Goals | Apps | Goals | Apps | Goals |
|---|---|---|---|---|---|---|---|---|---|---|
| Metz | 2009–10 | Ligue 2 | 0 | 0 | 1 | 0 | — | | 1 | 0 |
| Metz | 2010–11 | Ligue 2 | 22 | 2 | 4 | 2 | — | | 26 | 4 |
| Metz | 2011–12 | Ligue 2 | 20 | 0 | 4 | 0 | — | | 24 | 0 |
| Metz | 2012–13 | Championnat National | 38 | 11 | 5 | 3 | — | | 43 | 14 |
| Metz | 2013–14 | Ligue 2 | 37 | 14 | 2 | 0 | — | | 39 | 14 |
| Metz | 2014–15 | Ligue 1 | 30 | 5 | 5 | 1 | — | | 35 | 6 |
| Metz | 2015–16 | Ligue 2 | 38 | 12 | 4 | 3 | — | | 42 | 15 |
| Metz | Total | | 185 | 44 | 25 | 9 | 0 | 0 | 210 | 53 |
| Queens Park Rangers | 2016–17 | Championship | 26 | 3 | 2 | 1 | — | | 28 | 4 |
| Queens Park Rangers | 2017–18 | Championship | 5 | 0 | 2 | 1 | — | | 7 | 1 |
| Queens Park Rangers | Total | | 31 | 3 | 4 | 2 | 0 | 0 | 35 | 5 |
| Guingamp | 2017–18 | Ligue 1 | 16 | 4 | 1 | 1 | — | | 17 | 5 |
| Guingamp | 2018–19 | Ligue 1 | 15 | 1 | 4 | 2 | — | | 19 | 3 |
| Guingamp | 2019–20 | Ligue 2 | 21 | 4 | 2 | 0 | — | | 23 | 4 |
| Guingamp | 2020–21 | Ligue 2 | 21 | 5 | 1 | 0 | — | | 22 | 5 |
| Guingamp | Total | | 73 | 14 | 8 | 3 | 0 | 0 | 81 | 17 |
| Panathinaikos | 2020–21 | Superleague Greece | 14 | 0 | 2 | 0 | — | | 16 | 0 |
| Panathinaikos B | 2021–22 | Super League Greece 2 | 2 | 0 | — | | — | | 2 | 0 |
| Nancy | 2021–22 | Ligue 2 | 14 | 3 | 0 | 0 | — | | 14 | 3 |
| Western Sydney Wanderers | 2022–23 | A-League Men | 18 | 4 | 0 | 0 | 1 | 0 | 19 | 4 |
| Vejle | 2023–24 | Danish Superliga | 8 | 2 | 2 | 2 | — | | 10 | 4 |
| Career total | | | 345 | 70 | 41 | 16 | 1 | 0 | 387 | 86 |

=== International ===
As of match played 5 June 2017
Scores and results list DR Congo's goal tally first, score column indicates score after each Ngbakoto goal.

List of international goals scored by Yeni Ngbakoto
| No. | Date | Venue | Cap | Opponent | Score | Result | Competition |
|---|---|---|---|---|---|---|---|
| 1 | 5 June 2017 | Sports Center of FAR, Rabat, Morocco | 2 | Botswana | 2–0 | 2–0 | Friendly |

== Honours ==
Guingamp

- Coupe de la Ligue runner-up: 2018–19
