= William Bianda =

French footballer (born 2000)

Personal information
- Full name: William Ludovic Brandon Bianda
- Date of birth: 30 April 2000 (age 26)
- Place of birth: Suresnes, France
- Height: 1.86 m (6 ft 1 in)
- Position: Centre-back

Team information
- Current team: Laval
- Number: 3

Youth career
- 2006–2014: Red Star
- 2014–2017: Lens
- 2018–2020: Roma

Senior career*
| Years | Team | Apps | (Gls) |
| 2017–2018 | Lens II | 10 | (0) |
| 2017–2018 | Lens | 5 | (0) |
| 2018–2023 | Roma | 0 | (0) |
| 2020–2021 | → Zulte Waregem (loan) | 7 | (0) |
| 2021–2022 | → Nancy (loan) | 24 | (1) |
| 2024 | SL16 FC | 9 | (0) |
| 2024– | Laval | 35 | (1) |

International career
| 2016 | France U16 | 1 | (0) |
| 2016–2017 | France U17 | 13 | (0) |
| 2017 | France U18 | 7 | (0) |
| 2018 | France U19 | 2 | (0) |
- * Club domestic league appearances and goals as of 12 May 2026

William Ludovic Brandon Bianda (born 30 April 2000) is a French professional footballer who plays as a centre-back for Laval.

== Club career ==
Bianda signed his first professional contract with RC Lens on 29 July 2017. He made his professional debut with RC Lens in a 2–2 Ligue 2 tie with Paris FC on 9 December 2017.

On 27 June 2018, A.S. Roma announced the signing of the French defender from Lens for €6 million, plus up to €5 million in bonus payments.

On 5 August 2020, he went to Zulte Waregem on loan.

On 22 August 2021, he joined Nancy on loan.

On 1 February 2024, Bianda signed a contract with Standard Liège in Belgium and was assigned to their reserve team SL16 FC that plays in the second-tier Challenger Pro League.

On 10 July 2024, Bianda signed a contract with Ligue 2 club Stade Lavallois.

== International career ==
Bianda was born in France and is of Ivorian descent. Bianda represented France at the 2017 UEFA European Under-17 Championship and the 2017 FIFA U-17 World Cup.

== Career statistics ==
As of 23 January 2018

Appearances and goals by club, season and competition
| Club | Season | League | | | National Cup | | League Cup | | Europe | | Other | | Total | |
| Club | Season | Division | Apps | Goals | Apps | Goals | Apps | Goals | Apps | Goals | Apps | Goals | Apps | Goals |
|---|---|---|---|---|---|---|---|---|---|---|---|---|---|---|
| Lens | 2017–18 | Ligue 2 | 5 | 0 | 4 | 0 | 0 | 0 | — | | — | | 9 | 0 |
| Career total | | | 5 | 0 | 4 | 0 | 0 | 0 | 0 | 0 | 0 | 0 | 9 | 0 |
