= Hugo Constant =

French footballer (born 1999)

Personal information
- Date of birth: 26 November 1999 (age 26)
- Place of birth: Nancy, France
- Height: 1.89 m (6 ft 2 in)
- Position: Goalkeeper

Senior career*
Years	Team	Apps	(Gls)
2016–2022	Nancy II	26	(0)
2019–2022	Nancy	2	(0)
- * Club domestic league appearances and goals as of 28 May 2022

Hugo Constant (born 26 November 1999) is a French professional footballer who plays as a goalkeeper.

== Career ==
On 29 May 2019, Constant signed his first professional contract with Nancy. He made his professional debut with Nancy in a 0–0 Ligue 2 tie with Sochaux on 10 April 2021.
