= Julien Boyer =

French footballer (born 1998)

Personal information
- Date of birth: 10 April 1998 (age 28)
- Place of birth: Perpignan, France
- Height: 1.76 m (5 ft 9 in)
- Position: Left-back

Team information
- Current team: Boulogne
- Number: 12

Youth career
- 2004–2007: Cabestany
- 2007–2014: Canet Roussillon
- 2014–2015: Rodez
- 2015–2016: Canet Roussillon
- 2016–2017: Auxerre

Senior career*
| Years | Team | Apps | (Gls) |
| 2017–2018 | Canet Roussillon | 16 | (1) |
| 2018–2019 | Béziers | 5 | (0) |
| 2019–2020 | Quevilly-Rouen | 4 | (0) |
| 2020–2022 | Clermont | 0 | (0) |
| 2020–2022 | Clermont B | 2 | (0) |
| 2020–2021 | → Bourg-Péronnas (loan) | 8 | (0) |
| 2022 | → Bastia (loan) | 9 | (0) |
| 2023– | Boulogne | 82 | (3) |
- * Club domestic league appearances and goals as of 12 May 2026

Julien Boyer (born 10 April 1998) is a French professional footballer who plays as a left-back for Ligue 2 club Boulogne.

== Career ==
Boyer spent most of his youth career and development with Canet Roussillon before moving to Béziers in 2018. He made his professional debut with Béziers in a 1–1 Ligue 2 tie with Châteauroux on 22 February 2019.

In June 2020, Boyer signed a two-year deal with Clermont Foot, joining the professional group. Unable to break into the Ligue 2 side, he was loaned to Bourg-Péronnas in the Championnat National on 2 November 2020, until the end of the 2020–21 season. On 21 January 2022, Boyer joined Bastia on loan until the end of the season.

After leaving Clermont in June 2022, Boyer was without contract until 10 January 2023, where he signed with Championnat National 2 side US Boulogne.
