= Evangelos Patoulidis =

Belgian footballer

Personal information
- Date of birth: 24 September 2001 (age 25)
- Place of birth: Brussels, Belgium
- Height: 1.76 m (5 ft 9 in)
- Position: Midfielder

Team information
- Current team: Sandefjord
- Number: 7

Youth career
- 2008–2017: Anderlecht
- 2017–2020: Standard Liège

Senior career*
Years	Team	Apps	(Gls)
2020–2023	Oostende	14	(0)
2022–2023	→ Den Bosch (loan)	26	(1)
2024	Haka	29	(9)
2025–	Sandefjord	55	(13)

International career
2018	Belgium U18	3	(0)
2019	Belgium U19	3	(0)
- * Club domestic league appearances and goals as of 8 November 2026

Evangelos Patoulidis (Greek: Ευάγγελος Πατουλίδης; born 24 September 2001) is a Belgian professional footballer who plays as a midfielder for Eliteserien side Sandefjord.

== Professional career ==
Patoulidis is a product from the youth academies of Anderlecht and Standard Liège. On 15 October 2020, he signed a professional contract with Oostende. Patoulidis made his professional debut with Oostende in a 3-1 Belgian First Division A loss to Kortrijk on 29 November 2020.

On 31 August 2022, Patoulidis was loaned by Den Bosch in the Netherlands.

On 3 January 2024, Finnish premier division club Haka announced the signing of Patoulidis on a two-year deal. During the season, he scored nine league goals, making him Haka's best goalscorer of the season.

On 21 January 2025, Patoulidis signed a three-year deal with Norwegian Sandefjord for an undisclosed fee.

== International career ==
Born in Belgium, Patoulidis is of Greek descent. He is a youth international for Belgium.

== Career statistics ==
As of match played 8 November 2026

Appearances and goals by club, season and competition
Club	Season	League			National cup (Note: Includes Belgian Cup, KNVB Cup, Suomen Cup and Norwegian Cup)		League cup (Note: Includes Finnish League Cup)		Europe		Total	
Club	Season	Division	Apps	Goals	Apps	Goals	Apps	Goals	Apps	Goals	Apps	Goals
Oostende	2020–21	Belgian First Division A	4	0	0	0	—		—		4	0
Oostende	2021–22	Belgian First Division A	10	0	1	0	—		—		11	0
Oostende	Total		14	0	1	0	0	0	0	0	15	0
Den Bosch (loan)	2022–23	Eerste Divisie	26	1	2	0	—		—		28	1
Haka	2024	Veikkausliiga	29	9	5	1	5	2	—		39	12
Sandefjord	2025	Eliteserien	29	5	2	0	—		—		31	5
Sandefjord	2026	Eliteserien	26	8	2	0	—		—		28	8
Sandefjord	Total		55	13	4	0	0	0	0	0	59	13
Career total			124	23	12	1	5	2	0	0	141	26
