= Andy Musayev =

Belgian footballer

Personal information
- Date of birth: 17 April 2003 (age 23)
- Place of birth: Ostend, Belgium
- Height: 1.76 m (5 ft 9 in)
- Position: Forward

Team information
- Current team: KVDO

Youth career
- 2009–2012: VG Oostende
- 2012–2015: Oostende
- 2015–2018: Club Brugge
- 2018–2022: Oostende

Senior career*
Years	Team	Apps	(Gls)
2022–2024	Oostende	14	(0)
2024–2025	Veles Moscow	3	(0)
2025–	KVDO	0	(0)
- * Club domestic league appearances and goals as of 14 June 2025

Andy Musayev (Russian: Анди Лечиевич Мусаев; born 17 April 2003) is a Belgian professional footballer who plays as a forward for KVDO. He also holds Russian citizenship.

== Professional career ==
Musayev is a youth product of VG Oostende, Oostende, and Club Brugge. On 13 July 2022, he signed his first professional contract with Oostende until 2025. He made his professional debut with them as a late substitute in a 2–0 Belgian First Division A loss to Anderlecht on 24 July 2022.

== Personal life ==
Musayev was born in Belgium to Chechen parents who emigrated from North Caucasus to Belgium in the 90s during the Second Chechen War. He is a Muslim, and visited Chechnya often as a youth.
