= Mohamed Berte =

Belgian footballer (born 2002)

Personal information
- Date of birth: 25 March 2002 (age 24)
- Place of birth: Brussels, Belgium
- Height: 1.75 m (5 ft 9 in)
- Position: Forward

Team information
- Current team: Cracovia
- Number: 90

Youth career
- Léopold FC
- White Star Woluwe
- 2017–2021: Oostende

Senior career*
Years	Team	Apps	(Gls)
2021–2024	Oostende	42	(13)
2021–2022	→ FC Den Bosch (loan)	17	(2)
2024–2026	Dender	66	(11)
2026–	Cracovia	6	(2)
- * Club domestic league appearances and goals as of 00:11, 11 October 2026 (UTC)

Mohamed Berte (born 25 March 2002) is a Belgian professional footballer who plays as a forward for Ekstraklasa club Cracovia.

== Career ==
Berte is a product of the youth academies of the Belgian clubs Léopold FC, White Star Woluwe and Oostende. On 31 August 2021, he signed his first professional contract with Oostende until 2023. Later that same day, he was loaned out to the Dutch club FC Den Bosch in the Eerste Divisie for the 2021–22 season. Returning to Oostende the following season in the Challenger Pro League, on 22 August 2023 he extended his contract with the club until 2026. On 14 June 2024, he transferred to Dender in the Belgian Pro League on a contract until 2027.

On 19 August 2026, Berte moved to Polish top division club Cracovia on a three-year deal, with an extension option.

== Personal life ==
Born in Belgium, Berte is of Ivorian descent.
