= Kelvin Patrick =

Cape Verdean footballer (born 2000)

Personal information
- Full name: Kelvin Patrick Joia Rodrigues Araujo
- Date of birth: 8 July 2000 (age 26)
- Place of birth: São Vicente, Cape Verde
- Height: 1.87 m (6 ft 2 in)
- Position: Defensive midfielder

Team information
- Current team: Bourges
- Number: 20

Senior career*
Years	Team	Apps	(Gls)
–2021	Batuque		
2021–2022	Nancy	6	(0)
2021–2022	Nancy B	5	(0)
2022–2024	Racing Besançon	28	(2)
2024–2025	Saint-Priest	25	(1)
2025–2026	Bourg-Péronnas	7	(0)
2026–	Bourges	3	(0)
- * Club domestic league appearances and goals as of 7 February 2026

Kelvin Patrick Joia Rodrigues Araujo (born 8 July 2000), known as Kelvin Patrick, is a Cape Verdean professional footballer who plays as a defensive midfielder for French Championnat National 1 club Bourges.

== Career ==
On 5 August 2021, Patrick signed for Nancy in France. He made his debut for the club in a 1–0 Ligue 2 loss to Caen on 21 August.
