= Joris Sainati =

French footballer (born 1988)

Personal information
- Date of birth: 25 September 1988 (age 38)
- Place of birth: Martigues, France
- Height: 1.83 m (6 ft 0 in)
- Position: Defender

Senior career*
Years	Team	Apps	(Gls)
2006–2007	Istres	2	(0)
2007–2009	Lorient B	35	(0)
2009–2010	Pau	29	(0)
2010–2011	Orléans	32	(2)
2011–2014	Istres	59	(1)
2014–2015	Ergotelis	4	(0)
2015–2018	Ajaccio	76	(3)
2018–2020	Lorient	29	(0)
2020–2021	Ajaccio	11	(0)
2021–2023	Bastia	47	(0)
Total		324	(6)
- * Club domestic league appearances and goals

Joris Sainati (born 25 September 1988) is a French former professional footballer who plays as a defender.

== Career ==
Sainati was given a 16-month ban after he punched two players of Tours on 28 August 2015 in what was a 2–1 defeat for Ajaccio. This sanction, however, was later reduced to 10 months, thereby making Sainati eligible to play for the 2016–17 Ligue 2 season.

In 2021, Sainati signed for Ligue 2 club Bastia.
