= Maguette Diongue =

French footballer (born 1992)

Personal information
- Date of birth: 3 April 1992 (age 34)
- Place of birth: Cherbourg, France
- Height: 1.79 m (5 ft 10 in)
- Position: Midfielder

Team information
- Current team: Dives-Cabourg

Youth career
- Patronage Laïque d'Octeville

Senior career*
Years	Team	Apps	(Gls)
2009–2014	Cherbourg	89	(7)
2014–2016	Avranches	44	(5)
2016–2017	CA Bastia	23	(4)
2017–2018	Marseille Consolat	14	(4)
2018–2019	Drancy	3	(0)
2019–2023	SC Bastia	49	(9)
2024	Borgo	9	(0)
2024–	Dives-Cabourg	15	(2)
- * Club domestic league appearances and goals as of 10:21, 20 February 2026 (UTC)

Maguette Diongue (born 3 April 1992) is a French professional footballer who plays as a midfielder for Championnat National 3 club Dives-Cabourg.

== Personal life ==
Born in France, Diongue is of Senegalese descent. His father Yoro came to France from Senegal to play for Cherbourg in the 1980s. The Diongue family lived in Octeville, and Maguette started playing football at the local club of Patronage Laïque d'Octeville.

== Honours ==
Bastia

- Championnat National: 2020–21
