= Kévin Schur =

French footballer (born 1990)

Personal information
- Date of birth: 19 November 1990 (age 35)
- Place of birth: Saint-Germain-en-Laye, France
- Height: 1.79 m (5 ft 10 in)
- Position: Forward

Team information
- Current team: Rodange
- Number: 9

Youth career
- 1996–2006: Paris Saint-Germain
- 2006–2010: Versailles

Senior career*
Years	Team	Apps	(Gls)
2010–2012	Versailles		
2010–2011	→ Le Chesnay FC 78 (loan)		
2012–2013	Alençon	24	(18)
2013–2017	Avranches	71	(9)
2014–2017	Avranches B	16	(9)
2017–2018	Le Mans	16	(3)
2018–2023	Bastia	126	(20)
2023–2025	Dijon B	8	(2)
2023–2025	Dijon	39	(3)
2025–	Rodange	25	(5)
- * Club domestic league appearances and goals as of 13 June 2026

Kévin Schur (born 19 November 1990) is a French professional footballer who plays as a forward for Luxembourgian club Rodange.

== Career ==
Schur played ten seasons in the Paris Saint-Germain Youth Academy before joining Versailles. He made his senior debut in 2010 with Le Chesnay FC 78 in the Division d'Honneur. After spells at Alençon, Avranches, and Le Mans, Schur joined Bastia in 2018. With the club, he would gain three promotions, going from the Championnat National 3 to Ligue 2 in four seasons while establishing himself as a starter in the team. He played two seasons in Ligue 2 with Bastia before signing for Dijon in the Championnat National on 25 August 2023.

== Honours ==
Avranches

- Championnat de France Amateur: 2013–14

Bastia

- Championnat National: 2020–21
- Championnat National 2: 2018–19
- Championnat National 3: 2017–18
