= Dorian Bertrand =

Malagasy footballer (born 1993)

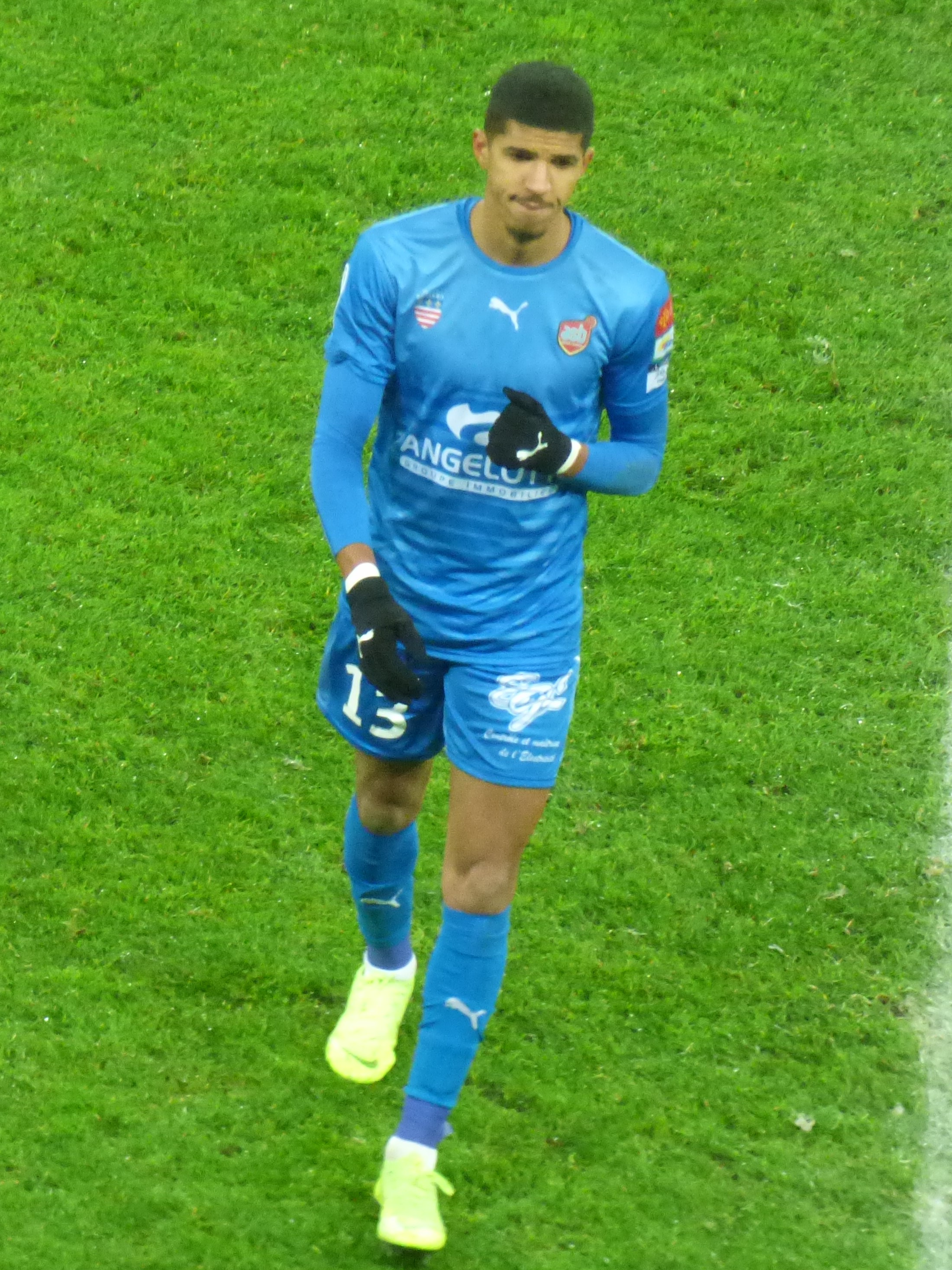
- Bertrand in 2019

Personal information
- Date of birth: 21 May 1993 (age 33)
- Place of birth: Saint-Denis, Réunion
- Height: 1.76 m (5 ft 9 in)
- Positions: Attacking midfielder; winger

Team information
- Current team: Saint-Denis
- Number: 24
- 2011–2012: Nantes

Senior career*
Years	Team	Apps	(Gls)
2012–2013	Angers II	11	(2)
2013–2018	Cholet	114	(24)
2018–2019	Angers	0	(0)
2018–2019	Angers II	8	(3)
2019	→ Béziers (loan)	10	(1)
2019–2022	Nancy	56	(1)
2021	Nancy II	6	(3)
2022–2024	Argeș Pitești	37	(2)
2024-	Saint-Denis		

International career^{‡}
2021–	Madagascar	8	(0)
- * Club domestic league appearances and goals as of 30 November 2023 ‡ National team caps and goals as of 20 November 2023

Dorian Bertrand (born 21 May 1993) is a professional footballer who plays as an attacking midfielder or winger for Liga II club Argeș Pitești. Born in Réunion, France, he plays for the Madagascar national team.

== Club career ==
A youth product of Saint-Denis FC in his native Réunion, Bertrand moved to mainland France in 2011 and spent most of his early career with Cholet. After being named the player of the season for the Championnat National in 2018, Bertrand transferred to Angers.

Bertrand made his debut for Angers in a 0–0 (3–2) penalty shoot-out loss in the Coupe de la Ligue to Guingamp on 31 October 2018. In January 2019, Bertrand was loaned to Béziers for the rest of the season.

== International career ==
Born in Réunion, France, Bertrand is of Malagasy descent. He debuted for the Madagascar national team in a 2–0 2022 FIFA World Cup qualification loss to Benin on 11 November 2021.

=== International ===
As of match played 20 November 2023

Appearances and goals by national team and year
National team	Year	Apps	Goals
Madagascar	2021	2	0
Madagascar	2022	1	0
Madagascar	2023	5	0
Total		8	0

== Honours ==
Cholet

- CFA 2 — Group B: 2014–15

Individual

- Championnat National Best Player: 2017–18
