= Thomas Basila =

French association football player (born 1999)

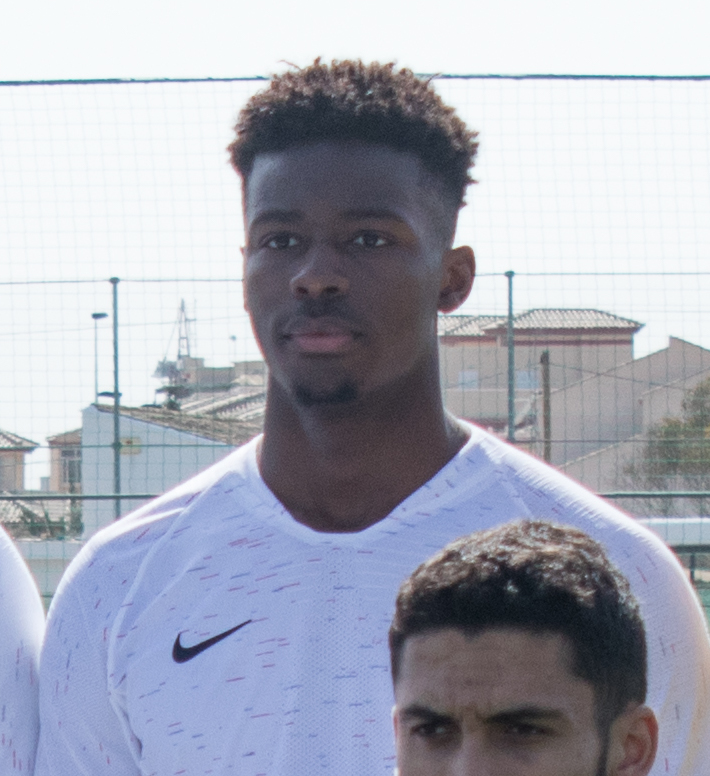
- Basila with France U20 in March 2019

Personal information
- Full name: Thomas Hervé Basila
- Date of birth: 30 April 1999 (age 27)
- Place of birth: Orléans, France
- Height: 1.87 m (6 ft 2 in)
- Position: Defender

Youth career
- 2005–2007: Saint-Jean-le-Blanc
- 2007–2013: Orléans
- 2013–2019: Nantes

Senior career*
Years	Team	Apps	(Gls)
2016–2021	Nantes B	54	(3)
2019–2021	Nantes	9	(0)
2021–2024	Oostende	12	(0)
2021–2023	→ Nancy (loan)	27	(2)
2024	Mesaimeer	2	(0)
2025–2026	FK Žalgiris	6	(0)

International career^{‡}
2014–2015	France U16	16	(1)
2016	France U17	1	(0)
2016–2017	France U18	5	(0)
2017–2018	France U19	7	(0)
2018–2019	France U20	12	(0)
2018	France U21	1	(0)
- * Club domestic league appearances and goals as of 21 June 2026 ‡ National team caps and goals as of 19 November 2019

Thomas Hervé Basila (born 30 April 1999) is a French professional footballer who plays as a defender.

== Club career ==
Basila made his professional debut for Nantes in a 2–1 Ligue 1 win over Lyon on 12 April 2019.

== International career ==
Born in France, Basila is of DR Congolese descent. He represented the France U19s at the 2018 UEFA European Under-19 Championship. He also played at the 2019 FIFA U-20 World Cup.
