= Sieben Dewaele =

Belgian footballer

Personal information
- Date of birth: 2 February 1999 (age 27)
- Place of birth: Kortrijk, Belgium
- Height: 1.88 m (6 ft 2 in)
- Position: Midfielder

Team information
- Current team: SK Beveren
- Number: 18

Youth career
- –2019: Anderlecht

Senior career*
Years	Team	Apps	(Gls)
2019–2021	Anderlecht	15	(0)
2020–2021	→ Heerenveen (loan)	7	(0)
2021–2024	Oostende	51	(1)
2021–2022	→ Nancy (loan)	17	(0)
2024–	SK Beveren	57	(0)

International career
2015	Belgium U16	2	(0)
2017	Belgium U18	1	(0)
2017–2018	Belgium U19	8	(1)
2019	Belgium U21	1	(0)
- * Club domestic league appearances and goals as of 19 April 2026

Sieben Dewaele (born 2 February 1999) is a Belgian professional footballer who plays as a midfielder for SK Beveren.

== Career ==
On 27 July 2020, Dewaele joined Eredivisie side Heerenveen on a season-long loan deal.

On 31 August 2021, he signed a four-year contract with Oostende and was loaned to French Ligue 2 club Nancy for the 2021–22 season.

== Career statistics ==
As of match played 15 December 2019

Appearances and goals by club, season and competition
Club	Season	League			National Cup (Note: Includes the Belgian Cup)		Europe		Other		Total	
Club	Season	Division	Apps	Goals	Apps	Goals	Apps	Goals	Apps	Goals	Apps	Goals
Anderlecht	2019–20	Belgian First Division A	15	0	1	0	—		—		16	0
Career total			15	0	1	0	—		—		16	0
