= 2022–23 SC Bastia season =

SC Bastia
2022–23 season
- President: Claude Ferrandi
- Head coach: Régis Brouard
- Stadium: Stade Armand Cesari
- Ligue 2: 4th
- Coupe de France: Round of 32
- Top goalscorer: League: Frank Magri (13); All: Frank Magri (13)
Home colours	Away colours	Third colours

The 2022–23 season was the 118th in the history of SC Bastia and their second consecutive season in the second division. The club participated in Ligue 2 and Coupe de France.

== Players ==
=== First-team squad ===
As of 1 February 2023.

Note: Flags indicate national team as defined under FIFA eligibility rules; some limited exceptions apply. Players may hold more than one non-FIFA nationality.

No.	Pos.	Nation	Player
1	GK	FRA	Zacharie Boucher
4	DF	FRA	Anthony Roncaglia
5	DF	FRA	Issiar Dramé
6	DF	FRA	Dominique Guidi
7	MF	FRA	Christophe Vincent
8	FW	FRA	Kévin Schur
9	FW	FRA	Benjamin Santelli
10	MF	FRA	Sébastien Salles-Lamonge
11	FW	FRA	Frank Magri
13	MF	FRA	Tom Ducrocq (on loan from Lens)
15	MF	LUX	Florian Bohnert
17	MF	FRA	Maguette Diongue
20	DF	FRA	Kylian Kaïboué

No.	Pos.	Nation	Player
22	DF	FRA	Kevin Van Den Kerkhof
23	DF	GAB	Lloyd Palun
25	DF	SEN	Abdoulaye Ndiaye (on loan from Lyon)
27	FW	FRA	Migouel Alfarela
28	DF	FRA	Joris Sainati
30	GK	HAI	Johny Placide
32	GK	FRA	Julien Fabri
39	FW	FRA	Kapit Djoco
42	DF	CPV	Dylan Tavares
66	MF	SLE	Jocelyn Janneh
86	FW	FRA	Antony Robic
96	FW	FRA	Yohan Baï

== Pre-season and friendlies ==
Win Draw Loss

12 July 2022 Friendly	Canet Roussillon (France)	0–4	(France) Bastia	Onet-le-Château
18:00 CEST (UTC+2)		Report	Schur 24'; Soumah 57'; Alfarela 85'; Robic 89'	Stadium: Stade d'honneur

14 July 2022 Friendly	Rodez (France)	0–2	(France) Bastia	Onet-le-Château
18:30 CEST (UTC+2)		Report	Alfarela 42'; Robic (penalty missed) 45+4'; Magri 61'	Stadium: Stade d'honneur

16 July 2022 Friendly	Nîmes (France)	0–1	(France) Bastia	Mallemort
17:30 CEST (UTC+2)		Report	Kaïboue 85'	Stadium: Stade d'honneur

19 July 2022 Friendly	Bastia (France)	0–2	(France) Furiani-Agliani	Bastia
19:00 CEST (UTC+2)		Report	Boy 2'; Boucharoud 29'	Stadium: Stade d'Erbajolo

23 July 2022 Friendly	Bastia (France)	1–0	(France) Martigues	Furiani
19:00 CEST (UTC+2)	Talal 38'			Stadium: Stade Armand-Cesari

10 December 2022 Friendly	Bastia (France)	1–0	Guadeloupe	Furiani
14:00 CET (UTC+1)	Alfarela 45' (pen.)			Stadium: Stade Armand-Cesari

14 December 2022 Friendly	Bastia (France)	1–2	(Italy) Fiorentina	Furiani
17:30 CET (UTC+1)	Kaïboué (yellow card) 37'; Santelli 88'		Mandragora (yellow card) 40'; Ranieri (yellow card) 44'; Igor 59'; Barák 66'	Stadium: Stade Armand-Cesari

== Competitions ==
=== Overall record ===
Competition	First match	Last match	Starting round	Final position	Record							
Competition	First match	Last match	Starting round	Final position	Pld	W	D	L	GF	GA	GD	Win %
Ligue 2	30 July 2022	2 June 2023	Matchday 1	4th	38	17	9	12	52	45	+7	44.74
Coupe de France	29 October 2022	21 January 2023	Seventh round	Round of 32	4	1	3	0	5	2	+3	25.00
Total					42	18	12	12	57	47	+10	42.86

Source: Soccerway

=== Ligue 2 ===
==== League table ====
Pos	Team	Pld	W	D	L	GF	GA	GD	Pts	Promotion or Relegation
2	Metz (P)	38	20	12	6	61	33	+28	72	Promotion to Ligue 1
3	Bordeaux	38	20	9	9	51	28	+23	69	
4	Bastia	38	17	9	12	52	45	+7	60	
5	Caen	38	16	11	11	52	43	+9	59	
6	Guingamp	38	15	10	13	51	46	+5	55	

Source: Ligue 2
Rules for classification: 1) Points; 2) Goal difference; 3) Number of goals scored; 4) Head-to-head goal difference; 5) Fair play points
(P) Promoted

==== Results summary ====
Overall								Home						Away					
Pld	W	D	L	GF	GA	GD	Pts	W	D	L	GF	GA	GD	W	D	L	GF	GA	GD
38	17	9	12	52	45	+7	60	11	4	4	26	15	+11	6	5	8	26	30	−4

Source: Ligue 2

==== Results by round ====
Round	1	2	3	4	5	6	7	8	9	10	11	12	13	14	15	16	17	18	19	20	21	22
Ground	H	A	H	A	H	A	H	A	H	A	A	H	A	H	A	H	H	A	H	A	H	A
Result	L	W	W	L	L	L	W	D	W	W	L	D	D	L	L	W	W	D	W	W	W	L
Position	17	9	4	8	11	15	11	11	8	7	9	9	9	12	14	13	11	11	8	5	4	

Source: Ligue 2
A = Away; H = Home; W = Win; D = Draw; L = Loss

==== Matches ====
The league fixtures were announced on 17 June 2022.

30 July 2022 1	Bastia	0–2	Laval	Furiani
19:00 CEST (UTC+2)		Report	Naidji 16', 63'	Stadium: Stade Armand Cesari; Attendance: 8,000; Referee: Nicolas Rainville

6 August 2022 2	Niort	1–4	Bastia	Niort
19:00 CEST (UTC+2)	Boutobba 82' (pen.)	Report	Tavares 1'; Magri 2', 24'; Ndiaye 21'	Stadium: Stade René Gaillard; Attendance: 2,190; Referee: Benjamin Lepaysant

13 August 2022 3	Bastia	3–0	Grenoble	Furiani
19:00 CEST (UTC+2)	Magri 8'; Salles-Lamonge 24'; Santelli 85'	Report		Stadium: Stade Armand Cesari; Attendance: 11,415; Referee: Eric Wattellier

20 August 2022 4	Amiens	3–1	Bastia	Amiens
19:00 CEST (UTC+2)	Leautey 15'; Fofana 45+2'; Bariki 90+4'	Report	Alfarela 17'	Stadium: Stade de la Licorne; Attendance: 6,000; Referee: Abdelatif Kherradji

27 August 2022 5	Bastia	0–2	Rodez	Furiani
19:00 CEST (UTC+2)		Report	Depres 52'; Far 71'	Stadium: Stade Armand Cesari; Attendance: 10,000; Referee: Bastien Dechepy

30 August 2022 6	Saint-Étienne	5–0	Bastia	Saint-Étienne
20:45 CEST (UTC+2)	Maçon 8'; Krasso 19', 33', 36', 62'	Report		Stadium: Stade Geoffroy-Guichard; Referee: Mikael Lesage

2 September 2022 7	Bastia	1–0	Dijon	Furiani
20:45 CEST (UTC+2)	Alfarela 55'	Report		Stadium: Stade Armand Cesari; Attendance: 10,000; Referee: Benjamin Lepaysant

10 September 2022 8	Nîmes	0–0	Bastia	Nîmes
19:00 CEST (UTC+2)	Vargas (red card) 27'; Guessoum (yellow card) 45+3'; N'Guessan (yellow card) 78'	Report	Vincent (yellow card) 45+3' (yellow-red card) 59'; Santelli (yellow card) 45+3'; Magri (red card) 88'	Stadium: Stade des Costières; Attendance: 2,870; Referee: Guillaume Paradis

17 September 2022 9	Bastia	1–0	Metz	Bastia
19:00 CEST (UTC+2)	Salles-Lamonge 10'; Roncaglia (yellow card) 18'	Report	Maïga (yellow card) 27'; Kouao (yellow card) 79'	Stadium: Stade Armand-Cesari; Attendance: 10,243; Referee: Aurélien Petit

1 October 2022 10	Annecy	0–2	Bastia	Annecy
19:00 CEST (UTC+2)		Report	Ndiaye (yellow card) 27'; Tavares 32'; Van Den Kerkhof 90'	Stadium: Parc des Sports; Attendance: 7,533; Referee: Azzédine Souifi

8 October 2022 11	Le Havre	3–0	Bastia	Le Havre
19:00 CEST (UTC+2)	Lloris 23'; Cornette 33'; Lekhal (yellow card) 45', (goal) 48'; Kitala (yellow card) 67'; Diallo (yellow card) 89'	Report	Robic (yellow card) 45'; Ducrocq (yellow card) 54'; Camara (yellow card) 72'	Stadium: Stade Océane; Attendance: 6,398; Referee: Remi Landry

17 October 2022 12	Bastia	1–1	Bordeaux	Furiani
20:45 CEST (UTC+2)	Kaïboué (yellow card) 39'; Magri (yellow card) 54'; Sainati (yellow card) 87'; Van Den Kerkhof 90+4'	Report	Ihnatenko (yellow card) 54', (goal) 83'	Stadium: Stade Armand-Cesari; Attendance: 12,000; Referee: Nicolas Rainville

22 October 2022 13	Guingamp	1–1	Bastia	Guingamp
19:00 CEST (UTC+2)	Kaïboué 86' (o.g.)	Report	Guidi (yellow card) 21'; Ndiaye (red card) 65'; Tavares (yellow card) 66'; Talal 78'; Kaïboué (yellow card) 80'	Stadium: Stade de Roudourou; Attendance: 9,827; Referee: Antoine Valnet

5 November 2022 14	Bastia	0–1	Paris FC	Furiani
19:00 CEST (UTC+2)	Guidi (yellow card) 41'; Ducrocq (yellow card) 72'; Kaïboué (yellow card) 88'	Report	Le Cardinal (yellow card) 26'; Guilavogui 34'	Stadium: Stade Armand-Cesari; Attendance: 10,498; Referee: Faouzi Benchabane

12 November 2022 15	Sochaux	1–0	Bastia	Montbéliard
19:00 CET (UTC+1)	Sissoko (penalty scored) 38'; Faussurier (yellow card) 42'; Kanouté (yellow card) 70'; Alvero (yellow card) 90+4'	Report	Guidi (yellow card) 20'; Ducrocq (yellow card) 24'; Sainati (yellow card) 37'; Van Den Kerkhof (yellow card) 45'	Stadium: Stade Auguste Bonal; Attendance: 11,175; Referee: Remi Landry

26 December 2022 16	Bastia	1–0	Caen	Furiani
21:00 CET (UTC+1)	Schur (yellow card) 25'; Kaïboué (yellow card) 77'; Vincent (yellow card) 78'; Baï 90+1', (red card) 90+3'	Ligue 2 Report; Soccerway Rpt.	Jeannot (penalty missed) 79'	Stadium: Stade Armand-Cesari; Referee: Aurélien Petit

30 December 2022 17	Bastia	1–0	Valenciennes	Furiani
21:00 CET (UTC+1)	Ndiaye (yellow card) 41'; Dramé 78'; Alfarela (yellow card) 89'	Report	Kaba (yellow card) 54'; Linguet (yellow card) 89'	Stadium: Stade Armand-Cesari; Attendance: 8,900; Referee: Benjamin Lepaysant

10 January 2023 18	Quevilly-Rouen	1–1	Bastia	Le Petit-Quevilly
20:45 CET (UTC+1)	Mafouta 16'; Soumaré (yellow card) 53'; Sangaré (yellow card) 54'; Pierret (red card) 59'	Report	Salles-Lamonge (yellow card) 34'; Santelli 49'; Ducrocq (yellow card) 57'; Bohnert (yellow card) 79'; Guidi (yellow card) 82'	Stadium: Stade Robert Diochon; Attendance: 3,446; Referee: Antoine Valnet

13 January 2023 19	Bastia	1–0	Pau	Furiani
20:45 CET (UTC+1)	Sainati (yellow card) 49'; Santelli 77'; Baï (yellow card) 89'	Report	Boli (yellow card) 61'; George (yellow card) 81'; Ruiz (yellow card) 83'	Stadium: Stade Armand-Cesari; Attendance: 8,000; Referee: Pierre Legat

28 January 2023 20	Grenoble	0–1	Bastia	Grenoble
19:00 CEST (UTC+2)	Gaspar (yellow card) 90'; Sbaï (yellow card) 90+2'; Monfray (yellow card) 90+5'	Report	Sainati (yellow card) 65'; Djoco 90'	Stadium: Stade des Alpes; Attendance: 4,392; Referee: Olivier Thual

31 January 2023 21	Bastia	2–0	Saint-Étienne	Furiani
20:45 CET (UTC+1)	Vincent (yellow card) 46'; Van Den Kerkhof (penalty scored) 50'; Ducrocq 65'; Kaïboué (yellow card) 66'	Report	Nkounkou (yellow card) 21'	Stadium: Stade Armand-Cesari; Attendance: 10,500; Referee: Abdelatif Kherradji

3 February 2023 22	Caen	3–1	Bastia	Caen
20:45 CET (UTC+1)	Brahimi (yellow card) 40'; Salétros 50'; Ntim (yellow card) 61'; Mendy 69' (pen.), 82'	Report	Ducrocq (yellow card) 31'; Sainati (yellow card) 63'; Salles-Lamonge (yellow card) 71'; Baï 88'	Stadium: Stade Michel d'Ornano; Attendance: 11,500; Referee: Faouzi Benchabane

11 February 2023 23	Bastia	0–1	Rouen	Furiani
19:00 CET (UTC+1)	Dramé (yellow card) 29'; Sainati (yellow card) 58' (yellow-red card) 79'	Report	Guidi 22' (o.g.); Sidibé (yellow card) 49'; Mafouta (yellow card) 79'; Boé-Kane (yellow card) 90+2'	Stadium: Stade Armand-Cesari; Attendance: 8,826; Referee: Mikael Lesage

18 February 2023 24	Bastia	1–1	Guingamp	Furiani
19:00 CET (UTC+1)	Kaïboué 32'; Van Den Kerkhof (yellow card) 48'	Report	Gaudin (yellow card) 36'; Courtet 80'	Stadium: Stade Armand-Cesari; Attendance: 8,750; Referee: Alexandre Perreau Niel

25 February 2022 25	Rodez	0–2	Bastia	Rodez
19:00 CET (UTC+1)	Adeline (yellow card) 42'	Report	Kaïboué 25'; Palun (yellow card) 45'; Vincent 60'; Van Den Kerkhof (yellow card) 79'; Djoco (yellow card) 85'	Stadium: Stade Paul-Lignon; Attendance: 2,613; Referee: Rémi Landry

4 March 2023 26	Bastia	4–2	Nîmes	Furiani
19:00 CET (UTC+1)	Vincent (yellow card) 16'; Djoco 28'; Magri (yellow card) 29', (goal) 36'; Van Den Kerkhof (penalty scored) 74'; Baï 88'; Santelli (yellow card) 90+3'	Report	Tchokounté 11', (yellow card) 73'; Djiga (yellow card) 38'; Pagis 50'	Stadium: Stade Armand-Cesari; Attendance: 9,793; Referee: Hakim Ben El Hadj

11 March 2023 27	Valenciennes	2–2	Bastia	Valenciennes
19:00 CET (UTC+2)	Debuchy (yellow card) 15'; Grbić 25', 48'; Linguet (yellow card) 30'; Picouleau (yellow card) 79'	Report	Magri 4', 69'	Stadium: Stade Nungesser; Attendance: 8,631; Referee: Aurélien Petit

18 March 2023 28	Paris FC	0–1	Bastia	Paris
19:00 CET (UTC+1)	Chergui (yellow card) 56'	Report	Magri 66', (yellow card) 90+2'; Kaïboué (yellow card) 84'	Stadium: Stade Sébastien Charléty; Attendance: 3,957; Referee: Abdelatif Kherradji

1 April 2023 29	Bastia	3–2	Sochaux	Furiani
19:00 CET (UTC+1)	Alfarela 11'; Salles-Lamonge (yellow card) 35'; Ndiaye (yellow card) 43'; Ducrocq (yellow card) 67'; Magri 73'; Santelli (yellow card) 75'; Djoco 76'	Report	Sissoko 29'; Kalulu 32'	Stadium: Stade Armand-Cesari; Attendance: 11,686; Referee: Olivier Thual

8 April 2023 30	Bordeaux	2–0	Bastia	Bordeaux
15:00 CEST (UTC+2)	Ihnatenko (yellow card) 36'; Maja (penalty scored) 37', (yellow card) 78'; Fransérgio 48', (yellow card) 85'; Bokele (red card) 90'; Davitashvili (yellow card) 90+4'	Report	Kaïboué (yellow card) 36'; Ndiaye (yellow card) 72'; Alfarela (red card) 90'; Placide (yellow card) 90+2'	Stadium: Matmut Atlantique; Attendance: 30,099; Referee: Jérôme Brisard

15 April 2023 31	Bastia	3–0	Annecy	Furiani
19:00 CET (UTC+1)	Magri 1'; Djoco 12'; Santelli 31'	Report	Mouanga (yellow card) 65'; Falconnier (yellow card) 70'	Stadium: Stade Armand-Cesari; Attendance: 9,729; Referee: Guillaume Paradis

22 April 2023 32	Dijon	1–1	Bastia	Dijon
19:00 CEST (UTC+2)	Thioune (yellow card) 66'; Le Bihan (yellow card) 71'; Soumaré 74'	Report	Ducrocq (yellow card) 38'; Salles-Lamonge 58'; Santelli (yellow card) 74'; Bohnert (yellow card) 79'; Kaïboué (yellow card) 90+5'	Stadium: Stade Gaston-Gérard; Attendance: 7,038; Referee: Romain Lissorgue

29 April 2023 33	Bastia	1–1	Amiens	Furiani
19:00 CEST (UTC+2)	Schur 30'; Placide (yellow card) 90+5'	Report	Assogba 36'; Ring (yellow card) 90+1'	Stadium: Stade Armand-Cesari; Attendance: 10,603; Referee: Faouzi Benchabane

6 May 2023 34	Laval	2–1	Bastia	Laval
19:00 CEST (UTC+2)	Elisor 17', 25' (pen.); Seidou (yellow card) 46'; Tapoko (yellow card) 80'	Report	Palun (yellow card) 63'; Magri 72', (yellow card) 78' (yellow-red card) 87'; Ndiaye (yellow card) 77'; Guidi (yellow card) 77'	Stadium: Stade Francis Le Basser; Attendance: 7,358; Referee: Azzédine Souifi

13 May 2023 35	Bastia	2–1	Niort	Furiani
19:00 CEST (UTC+2)	Van Den Kerkhof 49'; Tavares (yellow card) 53'; Santelli 71' (pen.); Palun (yellow card) 73'	Report	Ngom (yellow card) 44', (goal) 54'; Durivaux (yellow card) 47'	Stadium: Stade Armand-Cesari; Attendance: 8,499; Referee: Antoine Valnet

20 May 2023 36	Pau	2–6	Bastia	Pau
19:00 CEST (UTC+2)	George 17'; Begraoui (penalty missed) 28'; Ruiz (yellow card) 74'; Bassouamina (penalty scored) 78'; Sow (yellow card) 87'	Report	Santelli 20'; Magri 23', (yellow card) 39', (goal) 68', 85'; Guidi 56'; Palun 75'	Stadium: Nouste Camp; Attendance: 3,403; Referee: Rémi Landry

26 May 2023 37	Bastia	1–1	Le Havre	Furiani
20:45 CEST (UTC+2)	Guidi (yellow card) 40', (goal) 53'; Santelli (yellow card) 60'; Djoco (yellow card) 69'; Ducrocq (yellow card) 90+5'	Report	Casimir (yellow card) 45+1'; El Hajjam (yellow card) 52'; Logbo (yellow card) 64'; Opéri (yellow card) 69'; Grandsir 88'; Lloris (yellow card) 90+7'	Stadium: Stade Armand-Cesari; Attendance: 12,529; Referee: Guillaume Paradis

2 June 2023 38	Metz	3–2	Bastia	Metz
20:45 CET (UTC+1)	Sabaly 31'; Maziz 55', 75'	Report	Salles-Lamonge (yellow card) 23'; Bohnert 68'; Schur 86'; Kaïboué (yellow card) 90+2'	Stadium: Stade Saint-Symphorien; Attendance: 26,661; Referee: Ruddy Buquet

=== Coupe de France ===
29 October 2022 7th Rnd	AS Prix-lès-Mézières	0–0 (2–4 p)	Bastia	Charleville-Mézières
16:00 CEST	Borgniet (red card) 11'	Report		Stadium: Stade du Petit-Bois; Attendance: 2,381; Referee: Eddy Rosier

19 November 2022 8th Rnd	SC Marnaval	0–3	Bastia	Saint-Dizier
13:30 CET		Report	Schur 72'; Santelli 78'; Alfarela 90'	Stadium: Stade Charles Jacquin; Attendance: 3,030; Referee: Mickaël Leleu

7 January 2023 Rnd of 64	Évreux FC 27	1–1 (3–4 p)	Bastia	Ménilles
13:00 CET	Mendes 16'	Report	Salles-Lamonge 90+2'	Stadium: Stade Pacy-Ménilles; Referee: Romain Lissorgue
	Penalties
	T. Valentin (penalty scored); D. Mendes (penalty missed); I. Mendes (penalty scored); Betin (penalty scored); Boketsu (penalty missed)		(penalty missed) Salles-Lamonge; (penalty scored) Van Den Kerkhof; (penalty scored) Kaïboué; (penalty scored) Schur; (penalty scored) Alfarela

21 January 2023 Rnd of 32	Bastia	1–1 (a.e.t.) (1–4 p)	Lorient	Bastia
18:00 CET	Sainati 81'	Report	Koné 64'	Stadium: Stade Armand-Cesari; Attendance: 7,518; Referee: Romain Lissorgue
	Penalties
	Magri (penalty scored); Djoco (penalty missed); Kaïboué (penalty missed)		(penalty scored) Boisgard; (penalty scored) Yongwa; (penalty scored) Le Bris; (penalty scored) Abergel
