= 2023–24 SC Bastia season =

SC Bastia
2023–24 season
- Manager: Régis Brouard
- Stadium: Stade Armand-Cesari
- Ligue 2: 13th
- Coupe de France: Seventh round
- Top goalscorer: League: Facinet Conte (5); All: Facinet Conte (5)
- Average home league attendance: 10,104
Home colours	Away colours	Third colours

The 2023–24 season was SC Bastia's 119th season in existence and third consecutive in the Ligue 2. They also competed in the Coupe de France.

== Players ==
=== First-team squad ===
As of 23 October 2023.

Note: Flags indicate national team as defined under FIFA eligibility rules; some limited exceptions apply. Players may hold more than one non-FIFA nationality.

No.	Pos.	Nation	Player
1	GK	FRA	Zacharie Boucher
3	DF	FRA	Loup-Diwan Gueho
4	DF	FRA	Anthony Roncaglia
5	DF	MLI	Issiar Dramé
6	DF	FRA	Dominique Guidi
7	MF	FRA	Christophe Vincent
8	MF	FRA	Julien Maggiotti
9	FW	FRA	Benjamin Santelli
10	FW	FRA	Migouel Alfarela
13	MF	FRA	Tom Ducrocq
15	MF	LUX	Florian Bohnert
17	FW	FRA	Florian Bianchini
18	FW	FRA	Félix Tomi
19	MF	FRA	Mattéo Loubatières

No.	Pos.	Nation	Player
22	DF	MLI	Charles Traoré
23	GK	FRA	Julien Fabri
25	DF	SEN	Baye Ablaye Mbaye (on loan from CNEPS Excellence)
27	DF	FRA	Romaric Yapi
30	GK	HAI	Johny Placide
31	FW	GUI	Facinet Conte
39	FW	FRA	Kapit Djoco
42	DF	CPV	Dylan Tavares
66	MF	SLE	Jocelyn Janneh
91	FW	FRA	Sekou Lega (on loan from Lyon)
95	DF	FRA	Cheick Keita (on loan from Reims)
96	FW	FRA	Yohan Baï
99	DF	FRA	Yllan Okou

== Transfers ==
=== In ===
Pos.	Player	Transferred from	Fee	Date	Source
FFW	(France) Florian Bianchini	(France) Amiens	Free	1 July 2023	
MF	(France) Tom Ducrocq	(France) Lens		1 July 2023	
MF	(France) Julien Maggiotti	(Belgium) Charleroi		25 July 2023	
DF	(France) Cheick Keita	(France) Reims	Loan	31 August 2023	
DF	(Mali) Charles Traoré	(France) Nantes	Loan	1 September 2023	
DF	(France) Yllan Okou	(France) Monaco	€500,000	23 October 2023	

=== Out ===
Pos.	Player	Transferred to	Fee	Date	Source
DF	(Algeria) Kevin Van Den Kerkhof	(France) Metz	2,500,000	31 August 2023	

== Pre-season and friendlies ==
Win Draw Loss Fixtures

22 July 2023 Friendly	Rouen (France)	0–2	(France) Bastia	EU
17:00			Djoko 56' (pen.); Bianchini 83'	Stadium: Stade des Prés Sales

25 July 2023 Friendly	Bastia (France)	0–1	(France) UNFP
16:30			18'

27 July 2023 Friendly	Furiani-Agliani (France)	2–3	(France) Bastia	Bastia
19:00				Stadium: Stade d'Erbajolo

29 July 2023 Friendly	Bastia (France)	3–1	(Italy) Hellas Verona	Furiani
19:00 UTC+2				Stadium: Stade Armand-Cesari; Referee: Batta

4 January 2024 Friendly	Bastia (France)	2–1	(France) Furiani-Agliani
16:00 UTC+1	Tomi 56', 60'		Coly 45'

6 January 2024 Friendly	Monaco B (France)	1–1	(France) Bastia
13:00 UTC+1			Alfarela 9'

== Competitions ==
=== Overall record ===
Competition	First match	Last match	Starting round	Final position	Record							
Competition	First match	Last match	Starting round	Final position	Pld	W	D	L	GF	GA	GD	Win %
Ligue 2	5 August 2023	17 May 2024	Matchday 1	13th	38	14	9	15	44	48	−4	36.84
Coupe de France	18 November 2023		Seventh round	Seventh round	1	0	0	1	1	4	−3	0.00
Total					39	14	9	16	45	52	−7	35.90

Source: Soccerway

=== Ligue 2 ===
==== League table ====
Pos	Team	Pld	W	D	L	GF	GA	GD	Pts	Promotion or Relegation
11	Grenoble	38	13	12	13	43	44	−1	51	
12	Bordeaux (D, R)	38	14	9	15	50	52	−2	50 (Note: Bordeaux were deducted 1 point due to federation decision.)	Demoted to National 2
13	Bastia	38	14	9	15	44	48	−4	50 (Note: Bastia were deducted 1 point due to federation decision.)	
14	Annecy	38	12	10	16	49	50	−1	46	
15	Ajaccio	38	12	10	16	35	46	−11	46	

Updated to match(es) played on 17 May 2024. Source: Ligue 2
Rules for classification: 1) Points; 2) Goal difference; 3) Number of goals scored; 4) Head-to-head goal difference; 5) Fair play points
(D) Disqualified; (R) Relegated

==== Results summary ====
Overall								Home						Away					
Pld	W	D	L	GF	GA	GD	Pts	W	D	L	GF	GA	GD	W	D	L	GF	GA	GD
17	5	5	7	19	20	−1	20	4	2	2	12	11	+1	1	3	5	7	9	−2

Last updated: 5 December 2023.

==== Results by round ====
Round	1	2	3	4	5	6	7	8	9	10	11	12	13	14	15	16	17
Ground	A	H	A	H	A	H	A	H	A	H	A	H	H	A	H	A	A
Result	D	W	L	W	D	L	L	L	L	W	D	D	W	L	D	L	W
Position	13	4	10	5	6	9	13	14	14	14	13	14	11	14			

Updated to match(es) played on 5 December 2023. Source:
A = Away; H = Home; W = Win; D = Draw; L = Loss

==== Matches ====
The league fixtures were unveiled on 29 June 2023.

5 August 2023 1	Concarneau	0–0	Bastia	Guingamp
		Report		Stadium: Stade de Roudourou

12 August 2023 2	Bastia	3–0	Valenciennes	Furiani
19:00 CET (UTC+2)		Report		Stadium: Stade Armand-Cesari; Attendance: 14,127

19 August 2023 3	Amiens	2–1	Bastia	Amiens
19:00	Ciss (yellow card) 13'; Mafouta 36', (yellow card) 85'; Kaïboué (yellow card) 45+4'; Gélin 48'	Report	Djoco (yellow card) 28'; Dramé 44'; Ducrocq (yellow card) 85'; Placide (red card) 90+13'	Stadium: Stade de la Licorne; Referee: Pierre Legat

26 August 2023 4	Bastia	3–2	Troyes	Furiani
19:00 CET (UTC+2)		Report		Stadium: Stade Armand-Cesari; Attendance: 12,848

2 September 2023 5	Grenoble	0–0	Bastia	Grenoble
19:00		Report		Stadium: Stade des Alpes

16 September 2023 6	Bastia	0–3	Laval	Furiani
19:00 CET (UTC+2)		Report		Stadium: Stade Armand-Cesari; Attendance: 12,363

23 September 2023 7	Angers	2–0	Bastia	Angers
19:00 CET (UTC+2)

26 September 2023 8	Bastia	1–4	Pau	Furiani
20:45 CET (UTC+2)				Stadium: Stade Armand-Cesari

2 October 2023 9	Ajaccio	2–0	Bastia	Ajaccio
20:45 CET (UTC+2)

7 October 2023 10	Bastia	2–1	Annecy	Furiani
19:00 CET (UTC+2)				Stadium: Stade Armand-Cesari

21 October 2023 11	Rodez	1–1	Bastia	Paris
19:00 CET (UTC+2)				Stadium: Stade Sébastien Charléty

28 October 2023 12	Bastia	0–0	Guingamp	Furiani
19:00 CET (UTC+2)				Stadium: Stade Armand-Cesari

4 November 2023 13	Bastia	3–1	Bordeaux	Furiani
19:00 CET (UTC+1)		Report		Stadium: Stade Armand-Cesari; Attendance: 12,071; Referee: Mathieu Vernice

11 November 2023 14	Paris FC	1–0	Bastia	Paris
19:00 CET (UTC+1)	Kebbal 45+3' (pen.)	Report		Stadium: Stade Sébastien Charléty; Attendance: 6,438; Referee: Olivier Thual

25 November 2023 15	Bastia	0–0	Auxerre	Furiani
19:00 CET (UTC+1)		Report		Stadium: Stade Armand-Cesari; Attendance: 10,427; Referee: Willy Delajod

2 December 2023 16	Caen	1–0	Bastia	Caen
19:00 CET (UTC+1)	Mendy 87'	Report		Stadium: Stade Michel d'Ornano; Referee: Thierry Bouille

5 December 2023 17	Dunkerque	0–5	Bastia	Dunkirk
20:45 CET (UTC+1)		Report	Okou 2'; Alfarela 13', 68', 90+2'; Tomi 89' (pen.)	Stadium: Stade Marcel-Tribut; Referee: Rémi Landry

16 December 2023 18	Bastia	v	Quevilly-Rouen	Furiani
19:00 CET (UTC+1)		Report		Stadium: Stade Armand-Cesari

=== Coupe de France ===
18 November 2023 Seventh round	Lyon La Duchère	4–1	Bastia	Lyon
14:00 CET (UTC+1)		Report		Stadium: Stade de Balmont
