= 2022–23 Nîmes Olympique season =

Nîmes Olympique
2022–23 season
- President: Rani Assaf
- Head coach: Nicolas Usaï (until 16 November); Frédéric Bompard (from 21 November)
- Stadium: Stade des Costières (until 5 November); Stade des Antonins (from 5 November)
- Ligue 2: 19th (relegated)
- Coupe de France: Round of 64
- Top goalscorer: League: Malik Tchokounté (13); All: Malik Tchokounté (14)
Home colours	Away colours	Third colours

The 2022–23 season was the 86th in the history of Nîmes Olympique and their second consecutive season in the second division. The club participated in Ligue 2 and the Coupe de France, suffering relegation in the former.

== Players ==
As of 31 January 2023

Note: Flags indicate national team as defined under FIFA eligibility rules; some limited exceptions apply. Players may hold more than one non-FIFA nationality.

No.	Pos.	Nation	Player
1	GK	FRA	Axel Maraval
2	DF	FRA	Kelyan Guessoum
3	DF	FRA	Scotty Sadzoute (on loan from OH Leuven)
4	DF	FRA	Maël de Gevigney
6	DF	FRA	Benoît Poulain
7	FW	FRA	Lys Mousset (on loan from VfL Bochum)
8	DF	FRA	Thibaut Vargas
9	MF	GBS	Steve Ambri
10	MF	FRA	Nicolas Benezet
11	FW	FRA	Pablo Pagis (on loan from Lorient)
14	MF	DEN	Jens Jakob Thomasen
15	FW	COM	Rafiki Saïd
16	GK	FRA	Lucas Dias

No.	Pos.	Nation	Player
17	DF	MTQ	Ronny Labonne
18	FW	FRA	Malik Tchokounté
19	DF	BFA	Nasser Djiga (on loan from Basel)
20	MF	FRA	Léon Delpech
21	MF	CIV	Jean N'Guessan (on loan from Nice)
24	FW	MLI	Mahamadou Doucouré
26	DF	FRA	Sanasi Sy
28	MF	SEN	Joseph Lopy
30	GK	FRA	Amjhad Nazih
65	FW	SEN	Moussa Koné
76	MF	MTN	Guessouma Fofana
97	DF	MTQ	Patrick Burner

== Pre-season and friendlies ==
Win Draw Loss

2 July 2022 Friendly	Toulouse (France)	2–0	(France) Nîmes	Béziers
18:00 CEST (UTC+2)	Ratão 42'; Chaïbi 48'			Stadium: Stade de Sauclières; Attendance: 500; Referee: Abdelatif Kherradji

16 July 2022 Friendly	Nîmes (France)	0–1	(France) Bastia	Mallemort
17:30 CEST (UTC+2)			Kaïboue 85'	Stadium: Stade d'honneur

23 July 2022 Friendly	Nîmes (France)	4–2	(France) UNFP FC	Nîmes
17:30 CEST (UTC+2)	Benrahou 42' (pen.); Poulain 80'; Labonne 84'; Fomba 87'		Dembélé 29'; Mandefu 90'	Stadium: Stade des Costières

23 September 2022 Friendly	Toulouse (France)	2–1	(France) Nîmes	Toulouse
11:30 CEST (UTC+2)	Flemmings 61'; Zodehougan 67', (yellow card) 71'		Pagis 6'; Vargas (yellow card) 70'	Stadium: Annexe 1 du Stadium; Attendance: 0 Referee: Souiffi

10 December 2022 Friendly	Nîmes (France)	0–2	(France) Rodez	Nîmes
15:00 CET (UTC+1)			Raux-Yao 16'; Boissier 83'	Stadium: Stade des Costières

== Competitions ==
=== Overall record ===
Competition	First match	Last match	Starting round	Final position	Record							
Competition	First match	Last match	Starting round	Final position	Pld	W	D	L	GF	GA	GD	Win %
Ligue 2	30 July 2022	2 June 2023	Matchday 1	19th	38	10	6	22	44	62	−18	26.32
Coupe de France	29 October 2022	6 January 2023	Seventh round	Round of 64	3	2	0	1	7	1	+6	66.67
Total					41	12	6	23	51	63	−12	29.27

Source: Soccerway

=== Ligue 2 ===
==== League table ====
Pos	Team	Pld	W	D	L	GF	GA	GD	Pts	Promotion or Relegation
16	Valenciennes	38	10	15	13	42	49	−7	45	
17	Annecy	38	11	12	15	39	51	−12	45	Spared from relegation
18	Dijon (R)	38	10	12	16	38	43	−5	42	Relegation to Championnat National
19	Nîmes (R)	38	10	6	22	44	62	−18	36	Relegation to Championnat National
20	Niort (R)	38	7	8	23	35	67	−32	29	Relegation to Championnat National

Source: Ligue 2
Rules for classification: 1) Points; 2) Goal difference; 3) Number of goals scored; 4) Head-to-head goal difference; 5) Fair play points
(R) Relegated

==== Results summary ====
Overall								Home						Away					
Pld	W	D	L	GF	GA	GD	Pts	W	D	L	GF	GA	GD	W	D	L	GF	GA	GD
38	10	6	22	44	62	−18	36	9	2	8	27	23	+4	1	4	14	17	39	−22

Source: Ligue 2

==== Results by round ====
Round	1	2	3	4	5	6	7
Ground	H	A	H	A	H	A	A
Result	L	D	W	L	W	L	L
Position	16	13	10	15	9	13	

Source: Ligue 2
A = Away; H = Home; W = Win; D = Draw; L = Loss

==== Matches ====
The league fixtures were announced on 17 June 2022.

30 July 2022 1	Nîmes	0–1	Caen	Nîmes
19:00 CEST (UTC+2)	Guessoum (yellow card) 18'; Fomba (yellow card) 44'; De Gevigney (yellow card) 68'	Report	Mendy (yellow card) 45+3'; Essende (yellow card) 77'; Kyeremeh 90+3'	Stadium: Stade des Costières; Attendance: 2,969; Referee: Rémi Landry

6 August 2022 2	Saint-Étienne	1–1	Nîmes	Saint-Étienne
15:00 CEST (UTC+2)	Krasso 45' (pen.)	Report	Thomasen 32'	Stadium: Stade Geoffroy-Guichard; Referee: Mathieu Vernice

13 August 2022 3	Nîmes	1–0	Rodez	Nîmes
19:00 CEST (UTC+2)	Ómarsson 63'	Report		Stadium: Stade des Costières; Attendance: 2,615; Referee: Aurélien Petit

20 August 2022 4	Dijon	2–1	Nîmes	Dijon
19:00 CEST (UTC+2)	Jacob 38'; Le Bihan 75'	Report	Koné 83'	Stadium: Stade Gaston Gérard; Attendance: 7,500; Referee: Faouzi Benchabane

27 August 2022 5	Nîmes	1–0	Laval	Nîmes
19:00 CEST (UTC+2)	Koné 54'	Report		Stadium: Stade des Costières; Attendance: 2,221; Referee: Azzedine Souifi

30 August 2022 6	Grenoble	3–2	Nîmes	Grenoble
20:45 CEST (UTC+2)	Sanyang 19'; Correa 61'; Ba 81'	Report	Tchokounté 76', 90+1' (pen.)	Stadium: Stade des Alpes; Attendance: 4,850; Referee: Jérôme Brisard

2 September 2022 7	Valenciennes	3–2	Nîmes	Valenciennes
20:45 CEST (UTC+2)	Kaba 29'; Noubissi 49'; Bonnet 77'	Report	Tchokounté 45' (pen.); Koné 69'	Stadium: Stade du Hainaut; Attendance: 4,740; Referee: Alexandre Perreau Niel

10 September 2022 8	Nîmes	0–0	Bastia	Nîmes
19:00 CEST (UTC+2)	Vargas (red card) 27'; Guessoum (yellow card) 45+3'; N'Guessan (yellow card) 78'	Report	Vincent (yellow card) 45+3' (yellow-red card) 59'; Santelli (yellow card) 45+3'; Magri (red card) 88'	Stadium: Stade des Costières; Attendance: 2,870; Referee: Guillaume Paradis

17 September 2022 9	Sochaux	3–1	Nîmes	Montbéliard
19:00 CEST (UTC+2)	Sissoko (yellow card) 20', (goal) 34', 53'; Mauricio 22'	Report	N'Guessan 4', (yellow card) 76'	Stadium: Stade Auguste Bonal; Attendance: 11,287; Referee: Florent Batta

1 October 2022 10	Nîmes	0–1	Paris	Nîmes
19:00 CEST (UTC+2)		Report	Dabila (yellow card) 45'; Phiri (yellow card) 77'; Djiga 87' (o.g.)	Stadium: Stade des Costières; Attendance: 2,303; Referee: Mikael Lesage

8 October 2022 11	Quevilly-Rouen	3–1	Nîmes	Caen
19:00 CEST (UTC+2)	Diedhiou 18'; Mafouta 45', 56'	Report	Fomba (yellow card) 32'; N'Guessan (yellow card) 59'; Tchokounté 62'	Stadium: Stade Michel d'Ornano; Attendance: 2,900; Referee: Aurélien Petit

15 October 2022 12	Nîmes	2–0	Amiens	Nîmes
19:00 CEST (UTC+2)	Tchokounté 22'; Thomasen 34'; Fomba (yellow card) 82'	Report		Stadium: Stade des Costières; Attendance: 2,293; Referee: Bastien Dechepy

22 October 2022 13	Pau	1–0	Nîmes	Pau
19:00 CEST (UTC+2)	Beusnard 26'; Sylvestre (yellow card) 51'; Sow (yellow card) 59'; Koffi (penalty missed) 74'	Report	Vargas (yellow card) 31'; Djiga (red card) 35'; Tchokounté (yellow card) 48'; Koné (yellow card) 90+2'	Stadium: Nouste Camp; Attendance: 3,328; Referee: Rémi Landry

5 November 2022 14	Nîmes	1–0	Bordeaux	Nîmes
15:00 CET (UTC+1)	N'Guessan 6', (yellow card) 51'; Djiga (yellow card) 74'	Report	Lacoux (yellow card) 44'; N'Simba (yellow card) 84'	Stadium: Stade des Costières; Attendance: 9,462; Referee: Aurélien Petit

12 November 2022 15	Niort	1–1	Nîmes	Niort
19:00 CET (UTC+1)	Zemzemi 54'; Merdji (yellow card) 63'	Report	Burner (yellow card) 21'; Tchokounté 27'; Djiga (yellow card) 58'; Delpech (red card) 81'; Guessoum (yellow card) 89'	Stadium: Stade René Gaillard; Attendance: 3,788; Referee: William Toulliou

26 December 2022 16	Nîmes	1–2	Guingamp	Nîmes
21:00 CET (UTC+1)	Tchokounté (penalty scored) 30'; N'Guessan (yellow card) 68'; Benezet (yellow card) 90'	Report	Livolant (penalty scored) 22', (yellow card) 30'; Courtet (penalty scored) 90+2'	Stadium: Stade des Antonins; Attendance: 5,063; Referee: William Toulliou

30 December 2022 17	Annecy	0–0	Nîmes	Annecy
21:00 CET (UTC+1)	Pajot (yellow card) 55'	Report	Labonne (yellow card) 78'	Stadium: Parc des Sports; Attendance: 6,513; Referee: Azzédine Souifi

10 January 2023 18	Nîmes	1–4	Metz	Nîmes
20:45 CET (UTC+1)	Fomba (yellow card) 45+2'; Ahamada 54'	Report	Kouyaté (yellow card) 36'; Joseph 48', 60'; Sabaly 56', (yellow card) 74'; Mikautadze 89'	Stadium: Stade des Antonins; Attendance: 1,809; Referee: Mikael Lesage

13 January 2023 19	Le Havre	3–1	Nîmes	Le Havre
20:45 CET (UTC+1)	Diakité (yellow card) 49'; Cornette 61', 84', 90+2'; Casimir (yellow card) 70'	Report	Fomba 50', (yellow card) 58'; Benrahou (yellow card) 70'; Saïd (yellow card) 85'	Stadium: Stade Océane; Attendance: 8,262; Referee: Benjamin Lepaysant

28 January 2023 20	Nîmes	3–2	Niort	Nîmes
19:00 CET (UTC+1)	Tchokounté (penalty scored) 12', (yellow card) 44'; Pagis 17', 35'	Report	Boutobba 30'; Rocheteau (yellow card) 39'; Durivaux (yellow card) 53'; Benchamma 63'	Stadium: Stade des Antonins; Attendance: 1,405; Referee: Pierre Legat

31 January 2023 21	Guingamp	1–2	Nimes	Guingamp
20:45 CET (UTC+1)	Mbe Soh 33'; Barthelmé (yellow card) 49'; Muyumba (yellow card) 61'	Report	Benezet 63'; Lopy (yellow card) 76'; Koné 90+4', (yellow card) 90+5'	Stadium: Stade de Roudourou; Attendance: 7,916; Referee: Antoine Valnet

3 February 2023 22	Nîmes	0–2	Grenoble	Nîmes
20:45 CET (UTC+1)	N'Guessan (yellow card) 89'	Report	Phaëton 12'; Touray (yellow card) 44'; Bambock 53'	Stadium: Stade des Antonins; Attendance: 2,125; Referee: Benjamin Lepaysant

11 February 2022 23	Rodez	1–1	Nimes	Rodez
19:00 CET (UTC+1)	Depres (penalty scored) 7'; Raux-Yao (yellow card) 33'	Report	Saïd 50'; Benezet (yellow card) 78'; Ambri (yellow card) 90+4'	Stadium: Stade Paul-Lignon; Attendance: 2,605; Referee: Romain Lissorgue

20 February 2023 24	Nîmes	1–2	Saint-Étienne	Nîmes
20:45 CET (UTC+1)	Tchokounté 68'; Burner (yellow card) 87'	Report	Nkounkou (yellow card) 33', (goal) 34'; Wadji 51', (yellow card) 84'; Monconduit (yellow card) 81'	Stadium: Stade des Antonins; Attendance: 5,527; Referee: Olivier Thual

25 February 2023 25	Metz	2–0	Nîmes	Metz
19:00 CET (UTC+1)	Mikautadze 29'; Maziz 67'	Report	Fofana (yellow card) 31'; De Gevigney (yellow card) 90+1'	Stadium: Stade Saint-Symphorien; Attendance: 13,388; Referee: Aurélien Petit

4 March 2023 26	Bastia	4–2	Nimes	Furiani
19:00 CET (UTC+1)	Vincent (yellow card) 16'; Djoco 28'; Magri (yellow card) 29', (goal) 36'; Van Den Kerkhof (penalty scored) 74'; Baï 88'; Santelli (yellow card) 90+3'	Report	Tchokounté 11', (yellow card) 73'; Djiga (yellow card) 38'; Pagis 50'	Stadium: Stade Armand-Cesari; Attendance: 9,793; Referee: Hakim Ben El Hadj

11 March 2023 27	Nîmes	2–0	Quevilly-Rouen	Nîmes
19:00 CET (UTC+1)	Djiga (yellow card) 45+2'; Pagis 66', 71'	Report	Boé-Kane (yellow card) 19'; Pierret (yellow card) 57'	Stadium: Stade des Antonins; Attendance: 1,363; Referee: William Toulliou

18 March 2023 28	Bordeaux	1–0	Nimes	Bordeaux
19:00 CET (UTC+1)	Barbet (yellow card) 58'; Maja 81'	Report	Burner (yellow card) 19'	Stadium: Matmut Atlantique; Attendance: 15,856; Referee: Romain Lissorgue

1 April 2023 29	Nîmes	4–0	Annecy	Nîmes
19:00 CET (UTC+1)	Saïd 21', 25'; Mousset 60'; Fofana 73'	Report		Stadium: Stade des Antonins; Attendance: 1,700; Referee: Azzédine Souifi

8 April 2023 30	Amiens	1–0	Nîmes	Amiens
19:00 CET (UTC+1)	Kakuta 49'	Report	N'Guessan (yellow card) 56'; Thomasen (yellow card) 70'	Stadium: Stade de la Licorne; Attendance: 5,920; Referee: Antoine Valnet

15 April 2023 31	Nîmes	0–1	Le Havre	Nîmes
19:00 CET (UTC+1)	Pagis (yellow card) 22'; Poulain (yellow card) 45+3'	Report	Lekhal 45+4' (pen.)	Stadium: Stade des Antonins; Attendance: 1,963; Referee: Ruddy Buquet

22 April 2023 32	Paris FC	3–0	Nîmes	Paris
19:00 CEST (UTC+2)	Kebbal 41', 84'; Chahiri 81'	Report		Stadium: Stade Sébastien Charléty; Attendance: 3,252; Referee: Alexandre Perreau-Niel

29 April 2023 33	Nîmes	3–2	Pau	Nîmes
19:00 CET (UTC+1)	Saïd 2'; Tchokounté 44'; Guessoum (yellow card) 80', (goal) 90+3'; Maraval (yellow card) 82'; De Gevigney (yellow card) 85'	Report	Saivet 17'; Abzi (yellow card) 27'; Batisse (yellow card) 45+1'; Kouassi (yellow card) 45+3'; Boisgard (yellow card) 69'; Begraoui 84' (pen.)	Stadium: Stade des Antonins; Attendance: 1,532; Referee: Aurélien Petit

6 May 2023 34	Nîmes	3–3	Valenciennes	Nîmes
19:00 CET (UTC+1)	Saïd 3'; Tchokounté (yellow card) 41'; Poulain 65'; Benezet 71'; Ambri (yellow card) 90+6'	Report	Hamache (yellow card) 21', (goal) 44'; Boutoutaou 61', 70'; Buatu (yellow card) 86'	Stadium: Stade des Antonins; Attendance: 2,784; Referee: Rémi Landry

13 May 2023 35	Caen	4–2	Nîmes	Caen
19:00 CEST (UTC+2)	Mendy (penalty scored) 57; Mbock 69'; Mendy (penalty scored) 83; Kyeremeh (yellow card) 77' (goal) 90+3'	Report	Vargas 53'; Zerkane (yellow card) 82'; Saïd 84'	Stadium: Stade Michel d'Ornano; Attendance: 14,611; Referee: Pierre Legat

20 May 2023 36	Nîmes	1–2	Dijon	Nîmes
19:00 CET (UTC+1)	Saïd 19'; Benezet (yellow card) 64'	Report	Tchaouna 55'; Marié 77'; Thioune (yellow card) 84'; Nassi (yellow card) 86'	Stadium: Stade des Antonins; Attendance: 1,567; Referee: Jérémy Stinat

26 May 2023 37	Laval	2–0	Nîmes	Laval
20:45 CEST (UTC+2)	Elisor 18'; Naidji 36'; Sylla (yellow card) 46'; Roye (yellow card) 65'	Report	Ambri (yellow card) 40'; Fofana (yellow card) 67'	Stadium: Stade Francis Le Basser; Attendance: 8,673; Referee: Benjamin Lepaysant

2 June 2023 38	Nîmes	3–1	Sochaux	Nîmes
19:00 CET (UTC+1)	Tchokounté 9', 75'; Fofana (yellow card) 45'; Megier (yellow card) 82'; Saïd (penalty scored) 86'	Report	Sissoko 29'; Meddah (yellow card) 40'; Galves (yellow card) 85'	Stadium: Stade des Antonins; Attendance: 1,143; Referee: William Toulliou

=== Coupe de France ===
29 October 2022 7th Rnd	Nîmes	3–0	FC Borgo	Nîmes
19:00 CEST	Koné 2'; Saïd 14'; Pagis 81'	Report		Stadium: Stade des Costières; Referee: Antoine Valnet

19 November 2022 8th Rnd	Montauban FCTG	0–4	Nîmes	Montauban
15:00 CET		Report	Pagis 9', 37'; Tchokounté 47'; Ómarsson 66'	Stadium: Stade Sapiac; Attendance: 3,160; Referee: Olivier Thual

6 January 2023 Rnd of 64	Grenoble	1–0	Nîmes	Grenoble
18:00 CET	Sanyang 88'	Report		Stadium: Stade des Alpes; Attendance: 2,269; Referee: Alexandre Perreau Niel
