= Keyan =

Keyan is a given name. Notable people with the name include:

- Keyan Tomaselli (born 1948), South African communication professor and author
- Keyan Varela (born 2006), Portuguese footballer
- Zhao Keyan (born 1983), Chinese rapper

== Fictional characters ==
- Keyan Farlander, jedi appearing in the video game Star Wars: X-Wing
