= Jean N'Guessan =

Jean N'Guessan may refer to:

- Jean Claude N'Guessan, Ivorian judoka
- Jean N'Guessan (footballer), Ivorian footballer
