= Johny Placide =

Footballer (born 1988)

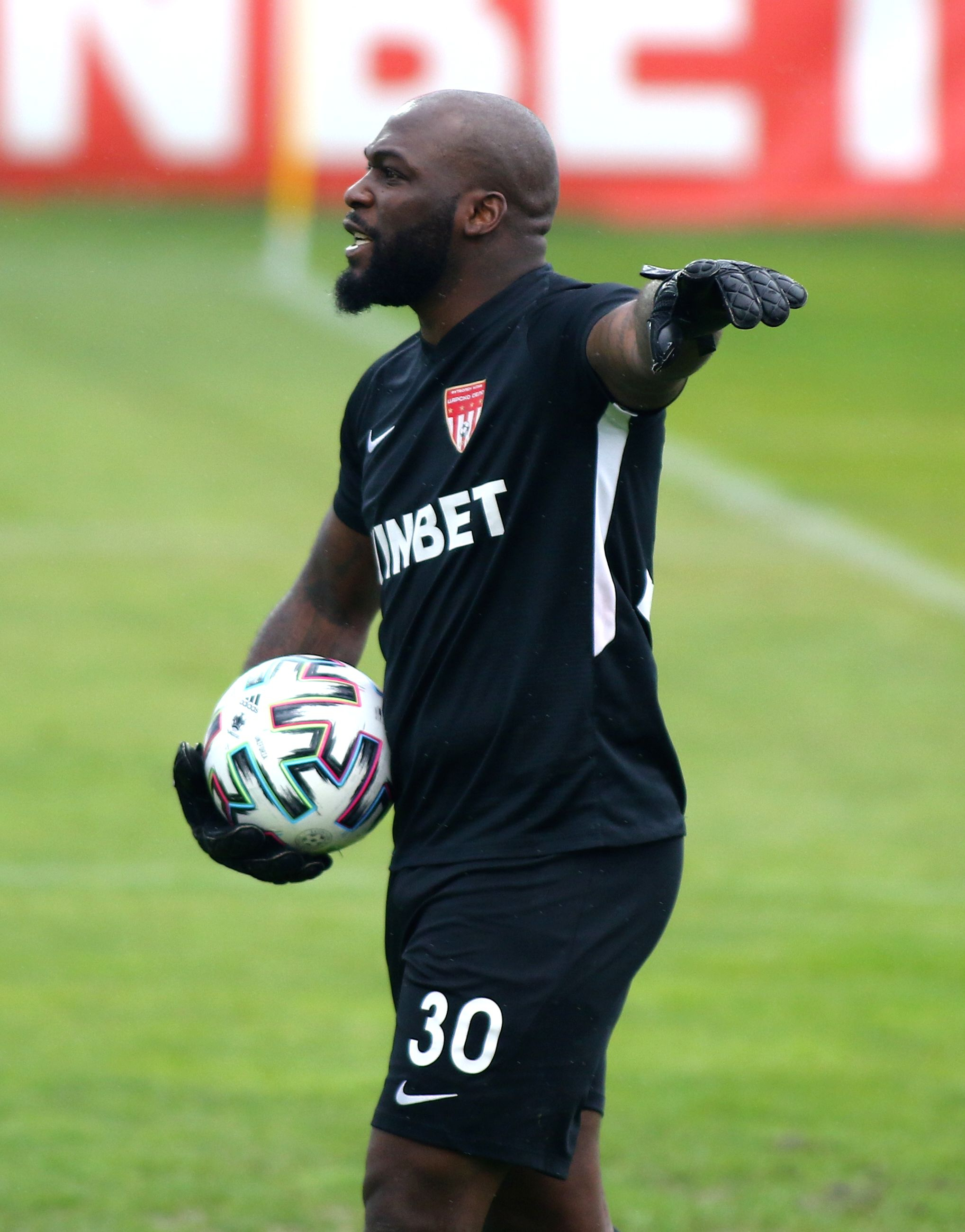
- Placide with Tsarsko Selo in 2021

Personal information
- Date of birth: 29 January 1988 (age 38)
- Place of birth: Montfermeil, France
- Height: 1.81 m (5 ft 11 in)
- Position: Goalkeeper

Team information
- Current team: FC Borgo
- Number: 16

Youth career
- 2000–2007: Le Havre

Senior career*
Years	Team	Apps	(Gls)
2007–2008	Le Havre B	23	(0)
2008–2012	Le Havre	97	(0)
2013–2016	Reims	49	(0)
2016–2017	Guingamp	0	(0)
2017–2018	Oldham Athletic	36	(0)
2019–2021	Tsarsko Selo	47	(0)
2021–2026	Bastia	139	(0)
2026–	FC Borgo	0	(0)

International career^{‡}
2008	Haiti U23	3	(0)
2008–2009	France U21	7	(0)
2011–2026	Haiti	85	(0)
- * Club domestic league appearances and goals as of 17 June 2026 ‡ National team caps and goals as of 25 June 2026

Johny Placide (born 29 January 1988) is a professional footballer who plays as a goalkeeper for FC Borgo. Born in France, he played for and captained the Haiti national team between 2011 and 2026.

== Club career ==
Placide began his career on youth side with Le Havre and was promoted to the first team in July 2008 and played four games in his first season. He played in his debut match on 26 April 2009 against Grenoble.

Placide joined Reims in January 2013. He made his league debut for the club on 19 January 2013 in a 1–0 away defeat to Sochaux. In July 2016, Placide was released from the club. He went on to play one season for Guingamp.

On 31 August 2017, Placide signed a two-year contract with League One side Oldham Athletic. On 26 September 2017, he made his debut for Oldham Athletic in a 3–2 victory over Peterborough United. He made several important saves and was awarded the man of the match award for his performance. On 3 October 2017, Placide earned his first clean sheet for Oldham Athletic in a 1–0 victory over Crewe Alexandra in the EFL Trophy. On 17 April 2018, he saved a key penalty from Rochdale's Joe Rafferty to help his side secure a 0–0 draw.

On 5 June 2021, Placide signed for newly-promoted Ligue 2 club Bastia.

== International career ==
Placide played for the Haiti national team at the 2008 Olympic Qualifying Tournament, losing all three qualifying games, but was most fondly remembered for his performance against Mexico; despite losing 5–1, Placide had saved several clear opportunities from Mexico during the match, including a penalty. Despite Placide's heroics, this game eliminated both teams and cost Hugo Sánchez his post as national coach. Placide was then called to the French U21 side playing at the Toulon Tournament. He earned his first French U21 cap in a 1–0 victory over Portugal U21.

Placide was called up by Haiti for the 2019 CONCACAF Gold Cup, in which his side won group B and made it to the semi-finals for the very first time, before being eliminated by Mexico.

On 15 May 2026, he was named in the 26-man Haiti squad selected by head coach Sébastien Migné for the 2026 FIFA World Cup. He announced his retirement from international football upon the conclusion of the World Cup tournament, having featured in all three group-stage matches.

== Career statistics ==
=== Club ===
As of match played 20 March 2026

Appearances and goals by club, season and competition
Club	Season	League			National cup (Note: Includes Coupe de France, FA Cup)		League cup (Note: Includes Coupe de la Ligue)		Other		Total	
Club	Season	Division	Apps	Goals	Apps	Goals	Apps	Goals	Apps	Goals	Apps	Goals
Le Havre	2008–09	Ligue 1	4	0	0	0	0	0	—		4	0
Le Havre	2009–10	Ligue 2	30	0	0	0	1	0	—		31	0
Le Havre	2010–11	Ligue 2	34	0	0	0	1	0	—		35	0
Le Havre	2011–12	Ligue 2	23	0	3	0	1	0	—		27	0
Le Havre	2012–13	Ligue 2	6	0	0	0	0	0	—		6	0
Le Havre	Total		97	0	3	0	3	0	—		103	0
Reims	2012–13	Ligue 1	4	0	1	0	0	0	—		5	0
Reims	2013–14	Ligue 1	4	0	1	0	2	0	—		7	0
Reims	2014–15	Ligue 1	22	0	0	0	0	0	—		22	0
Reims	2015–16	Ligue 1	19	0	0	0	0	0	—		19	0
Reims	Total		49	0	2	0	2	0	—		53	0
Guingamp	2016–17	Ligue 1	0	0	0	0	0	0	—		0	0
Oldham Athletic	2017–18	League One	36	0	1	0	0	0	5 (Note: Appearances in EFL Trophy)	0	42	0
Tsarsko Selo	2019–20	Bulgarian First League	19	0	0	0	—		1 (Note: Appearance in Bulgarian First League relegation play-offs)	0	20	0
Tsarsko Selo	2020–21	Bulgarian First League	28	0	0	0	—		0	0	28	0
Tsarsko Selo	Total		47	0	0	0	—		0	0	48	0
Bastia	2021–22	Ligue 2	16	0	6	0	—		—		22	0
Bastia	2022–23	Ligue 2	33	0	0	0	—		—		33	0
Bastia	2023–24	Ligue 2	32	0	0	0	—		—		32	0
Bastia	2024–25	Ligue 2	34	0	0	0	—		—		34	0
Bastia	2025–26	Ligue 2	24	0	0	0	—		—		24	0
Bastia	Total		139	0	6	0	—		—		145	0
Career total			368	0	12	0	5	0	6	0	391	0

=== International ===
As of match played 24 June 2026

Appearances and goals by national team and year
National team	Year	Apps	Goals
Haiti	2011	2	0
Haiti	2012	8	0
Haiti	2013	1	0
Haiti	2014	4	0
Haiti	2015	10	0
Haiti	2016	9	0
Haiti	2017	2	0
Haiti	2018	5	0
Haiti	2019	13	0
Haiti	2021	4	0
Haiti	2022	3	0
Haiti	2023	4	0
Haiti	2024	6	0
Haiti	2025	9	0
Haiti	2026	5	0
Total		85	0

== Honours ==
Haiti

- Caribbean Cup bronze medal: 2012, 2014
