= Issiar Dramé =

French footballer (born 1999)

Personal information
- Date of birth: 16 February 1999 (age 27)
- Place of birth: Ivry-sur-Seine, France
- Height: 1.97 m (6 ft 6 in)
- Position: Centre-back

Youth career
- –2015: Clairefontaine
- 2015–2016: Rennes
- 2016–2017: Lyon

Senior career*
Years	Team	Apps	(Gls)
2017–2020	Lyon B	16	(0)
2020–2021	Olimpik Donetsk	18	(0)
2021	New York Red Bulls II	3	(0)
2022	Lviv	0	(0)
2022–2024	Bastia	26	(3)
2024	Bastia B	1	(0)
2024–2026	Estrela da Amadora	22	(0)
- * Club domestic league appearances and goals as of 8 August 2026

Issiar Dramé (born 16 February 1999) is a French professional footballer who plays as a centre-back.

== Club career ==
=== Earlier career ===
Born in Ivry-sur-Seine, Dramé began his career at the famed Clairefontaine academy before joining the youth side at Rennes in 2015. After spending a season with Rennais, Dramé moved to the youth side at Lyon. In 2017, he was promoted to the club's reserve side, making his Championnat National 2 debut on 18 February 2017 in a 1–1 draw against Andrézieux.

In 2020, in search of first team football, Dramé trialed at Norwegian club SK Brann and Austrian Bundesliga club Sturm Graz but did not sign with either side.

=== Olimpik Donetsk ===
In October 2020, Dramé joined Ukrainian Premier League club Olimpik Donetsk. He made his debut on 24 October 2020 against Desna Chernihiv, starting in the 2–0 home defeat. Dramé played in 18 matches for Olimpik Donetsk as the club were relegated to the First League.

=== New York Red Bulls ===
On 29 September 2021, Dramé signed with MLS side New York Red Bulls. Following the 2021 season, New York declined their contract option on Dramé.

=== Bastia ===
On 1 September 2022, Dramé signed for Ligue 2 club Bastia on a three-year contract.

== International career ==
Born in France, Dramé is of Malian descent. He was called up to the Mali national team for 2023 Africa Cup of Nations qualification matches in March 2023.

== Personal life ==
His brother Hamed Dramé is also a professional footballer.

== Career statistics ==
As of match played 17 May 2025

Appearances and goals by club, season and competition
Club	Season	League			National cup		Continental		Total	
Club	Season	Division	Apps	Goals	Apps	Goals	Apps	Goals	Apps	Goals
Lyon B	2016–17	Championnat National 2	1	0	—		—		1	0
Lyon B	2017–18	Championnat National 2	1	0	—		—		1	0
Lyon B	2018–19	Championnat National 2	9	0	—		—		9	0
Lyon B	2019–20	Championnat National 2	2	0	—		—		2	0
Lyon B	2020–21	Championnat National 2	3	0	—		—		3	0
Lyon B	Total		16	0	—		—		16	0
Olimpik Donetsk	2020–21	Ukrainian Premier League	18	0	1	0	—		19	0
New York Red Bulls II	2021	USL Championship	3	0	—		—		3	0
Bastia	2022–23	Ligue 2	6	1	1	0	—		7	1
Bastia	2023–24	Ligue 2	20	2	0	0	—		20	2
Bastia	Total		26	3	1	0	—		27	3
Bastia II	2023–24	Championnat National 3	1	0	—		—		1	0
Estrela Amadora	2024–25	Primeira Liga	21	0	0	0	—		21	0
Career total			85	3	2	0	0	0	87	3
