= Hamed Dramé =

French footballer (born 2001)

Personal information
- Full name: Hamed Karamoko Dramé
- Date of birth: 13 June 2001 (age 25)
- Place of birth: Vitry-sur-Seine, France
- Height: 1.93 m (6 ft 4 in)
- Position: Centre-back

Team information
- Current team: Akritas Chlorakas
- Number: 5

Youth career
- –2018: Montrouge FC
- 2018–2019: Vitória de Guimarães
- 2019: Quevilly
- 2019–2020: Niort

Senior career*
Years	Team	Apps	(Gls)
2019	Quevilly B	0	(0)
2019–2020	Niort B	2	(0)
2020–2021	Rubikon Kyiv	3	(0)
2021–2023	Akritas Chlorakas	30	(2)
2023	AC Oulu	5	(0)
2024	Olympiakos Nicosia	9	(1)
2024–2025	Turris	0	(0)
2025	Giugliano	0	(0)
2025	→ Angri (loan)	5	(0)
2025	Estrela da Amadora	0	(0)
2026	Saint-Colomban Locminé	0	(0)
2026–	Akritas Chlorakas	5	(2)
- * Club domestic league appearances and goals as of 16 November 2025

Hamed Karamoko Dramé (born 13 June 2001) is a French professional footballer who plays as a centre-back for Cypriot Second Division club Akritas Chlorakas. Born in France, Dramé is of Malian descent.

== Career ==
After playing in his native France, Portugal, Ukraine and Cyprus, Dramé signed with a newly promoted Belgian Challenger Pro League club Francs Borains in August 2023, but his contract was terminated three days later by mutual agreement.

Shortly after his visit to Belgium, Dramé moved to Finland and signed with Veikkausliiga side AC Oulu in August 2023, on a deal for the rest of the season. His contract with Oulu was extended for the 2024 season in November 2023. However, it was terminated on 31 January 2024, and he joined Olympiakos Nicosia.

On 22 July 2025, Dramé signed for Estrela da Amadora of the Primeira Liga. The club announced on 6 November that his contract had been terminated by mutual agreement, and he left without having made a first-team appearance.

Three months later, in February 2026, Dramé joined Saint-Colomban Locminé of the Championnat National 2. On 16 July, he returned to Akritas Chlorakas, who were preparing for the 2026–27 season in the Second Division. The club said that bringing back a player who already knew Akritas from the inside would be valuable for the campaign ahead. On 10 October, Dramé scored Akritas's goal in a 2–1 defeat away to PAEEK. Eleven days later, Akritas met First Division club AEK Larnaca in the first round of the Cypriot Cup at the AEK Arena. Dramé conceded a penalty in the 90th minute that put AEK 2–1 ahead, but in the sixth minute of stoppage time he equalised, taking the tie into extra time. AEK won 3–2 with a penalty in the 100th minute. Three days later, Dramé opened the scoring in a 2–0 away win over AE Polemidion.

== Personal life ==
His brother Issiar Dramé is also a professional footballer.

== Career statistics ==
As of 2 June 2025

Appearances and goals by club, season and competition
Club	Season	League			National cup (Note: Includes Cypriot Cup)		Other		Total	
Club	Season	Division	Apps	Goals	Apps	Goals	Apps	Goals	Apps	Goals
Niort B	2019–20	National 3	2	0	0	0	—		2	0
Rubikon Kyiv	2020–21	Ukrainian Second League	3	0	0	0	—		3	0
Akritas Chlorakas	2021–22	Cypriot Second Division	2	1	1	0	—		3	1
Akritas Chlorakas	2022–23	Cypriot First Division	28	1	1	0	—		29	1
Akritas Chlorakas	Total		30	2	2	0	0	0	32	2
AC Oulu	2023	Veikkausliiga	5	0	0	0	0	0	5	0
Olympiakos Nicosia	2023–24	Cypriot Second Division	9	1	0	0	—		9	1
Turris	2024–25	Serie C	0	0	0	0	—		0	0
Giugliano	2024–25	Serie C	0	0	0	0	—		0	0
Angri (loan)	2024–25	Serie D	5	0	—		—		5	0
Estrela da Amadora	2025–26	Primeira Liga	0	0	0	0	0	0	0	0
Career total			54	3	2	0	0	0	56	3
