= Florian Bohnert =

Luxembourgish footballer (born 1997)

Personal information
- Date of birth: 9 November 1997 (age 29)
- Place of birth: Luxembourg
- Height: 1.82 m (6 ft 0 in)
- Positions: Attacking midfielder; right winger

Team information
- Current team: Hansa Rostock
- Number: 3

Youth career
- 2003–2011: Avenir Beggen
- 2011–2013: Racing Union
- 2013–2016: 1. FC Saarbrücken

Senior career*
Years	Team	Apps	(Gls)
2016–2018	Schalke 04 II	30	(0)
2018–2019	FK Pirmasens	31	(5)
2019–2021	Mainz 05 II	43	(1)
2021–2023	Progrès Niederkorn	42	(3)
2023–2026	Bastia	104	(2)
2026–	Hansa Rostock	0	(0)

International career^{‡}
2012–2013	Luxembourg U17	5	(0)
2014–2015	Luxembourg U19	5	(0)
2015–2017	Luxembourg U21	9	(0)
2016–	Luxembourg	69	(1)
- * Club domestic league appearances and goals as of 12 May 2026 ‡ National team caps and goals as of 16 November 2026

Florian Bohnert (born 9 November 1997) is a Luxembourgish professional footballer who plays as an attacking midfielder or right winger for German 3. Liga club Hansa Rostock and the Luxembourg national team.

== Club career ==
On 1 January 2023, Bohnert joined Bastia, on a contract until 2025.

== International career ==
Bohnert made his debut for the Luxembourg national team on 31 May 2016.

== Career statistics ==
=== Club ===
As of match played 17 May 2024

Appearances and goals by club, season and competition
Club	Season	League			Cup		Europe		Other		Total	
Club	Season	Division	Apps	Goals	Apps	Goals	Apps	Goals	Apps	Goals	Apps	Goals
Schalke 04 II	2016–17	Regionalliga West	22	0	—		—		—		22	0
Schalke 04 II	2017–18	Oberliga Westfalen	8	0	—		—		—		8	0
Schalke 04 II	Total		30	0	—		—		—		30	0
FK Pirmasens	2018–19	Regionalliga Südwest	31	5	2	1	—		—		33	6
Mainz II	2019–20	Regionalliga Südwest	18	0	0	0	—		—		18	0
Mainz II	2020–21	Regionalliga Südwest	25	1	0	0	—		—		25	1
Mainz II	Total		43	1	0	0	—		—		43	1
Progrès Niederkorn	2021–22	Luxembourg National Division	28	3	2	0	—		—		30	3
Progrès Niederkorn	2022–23	Luxembourg National Division	14	0	1	0	—		—		15	0
Progrès Niederkorn	Total		42	3	3	0	—		—		45	3
Bastia	2022–23	Ligue 2	18	1	2	0	—		—		20	1
Bastia	2023–24	Ligue 2	34	1	0	0	—		—		34	1
Bastia	Total		52	2	1	0	—		—		53	2
Career total			198	11	6	1	0	0	0	0	204	12

=== International ===
As of match played 16 November 2026

Appearances and goals by national team and year
National team	Year	Apps	Goals
Luxembourg	2016	5	1
Luxembourg	2017	4	0
Luxembourg	2018	3	0
Luxembourg	2019	3	0
Luxembourg	2020	3	0
Luxembourg	2021	5	0
Luxembourg	2022	9	0
Luxembourg	2023	9	0
Luxembourg	2024	7	0
Luxembourg	2025	9	0
Luxembourg	2026	10	0
Total		69	1

Scores and results list Luxembourg's goal tally first, score column indicates score after each Bohnert goal.

List of international goals scored by Florian Bohnert
No.	Date	Venue	Opponent	Score	Result	Competition
1	6 September 2016	Vasil Levski National Stadium, Sofia, Bulgaria	Bulgaria	3–3	3–4	2018 FIFA World Cup qualification
