= Félix Tomi =

French footballer (born 2000)

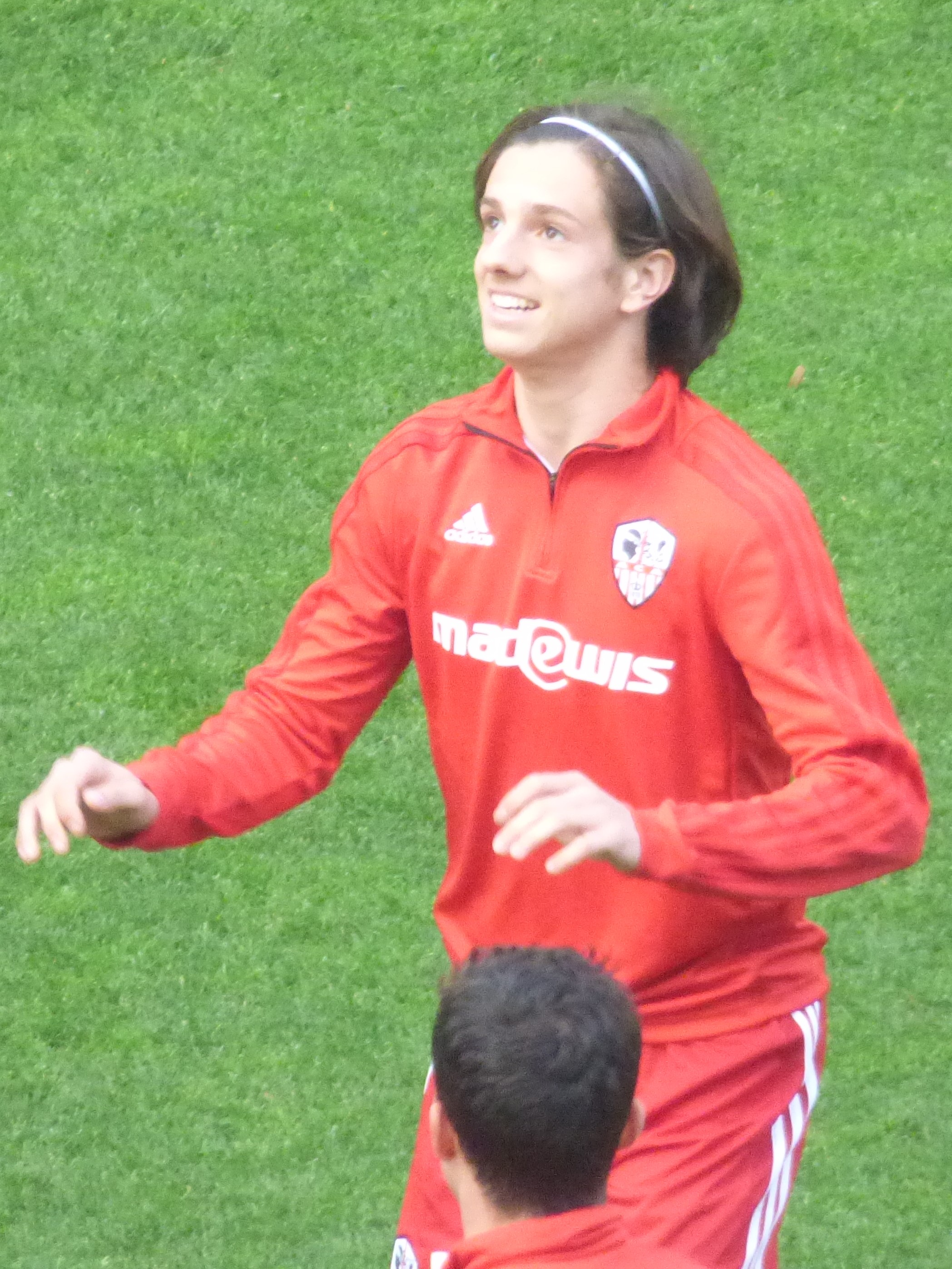
- Tomi in 2018

Personal information
- Date of birth: 31 August 2000 (age 26)
- Place of birth: Ajaccio, France
- Height: 1.81 m (5 ft 11 in)
- Position: Attacking midfielder

Team information
- Current team: Bastia
- Number: 9

Senior career*
Years	Team	Apps	(Gls)
2017–2020	Ajaccio II	33	(13)
2018–2020	Ajaccio	10	(0)
2020–2022	Le Mans	44	(2)
2022–2023	Gazélec Ajaccio	12	(6)
2023–	Bastia	77	(10)
- * Club domestic league appearances and goals as of 12 May 2026

Félix Tomi (born 31 August 2000) is a French professional footballer who plays as an attacking midfielder for Ligue 3 club Bastia.

== Career ==
Trained as a youth by AC Ajaccio, Tomi made his first team debut with the club in a 3–1 Ligue 2 win over US Orléans on 14 December 2018. He went on to make ten Ligue 2 appearances in the 2018–19 season, but was overlooked and had to play in the reserve team in Championnat National 3 in the 2019–20 season. In July 2020 he left AC Ajaccio and signed for Championnat National side Le Mans.
