= Keyan Varela =

Portuguese footballer (born 2006)

Personal information
- Full name: Keyan Anderson Pereira Varela
- Date of birth: 26 April 2006 (age 20)
- Place of birth: Geneva, Switzerland
- Height: 1.82 m (6 ft 0 in)
- Position: Winger

Team information
- Current team: RKC Waalwijk (on loan from Servette)
- Number: 20

Youth career
- 2016–2018: Étoile Carouge
- 2018–2024: Servette

Senior career*
Years	Team	Apps	(Gls)
2024–2025	Servette II	3	(0)
2024–	Servette	21	(3)
2026	→ Greuther Fürth (loan)	3	(0)
2026–	→ RKC Waalwijk (loan)	0	(0)

International career^{‡}
2024–2025	Portugal U19	6	(2)
2025–	Portugal U20	1	(1)
- * Club domestic league appearances and goals as of 18 May 2026 ‡ National team caps and goals as of 10:58, 17 January 2026 (UTC)

Keyan Anderson Pereira Varela (born 26 April 2006) is a professional footballer who plays as a winger for Eerste Divisie club RKC Waalwijk, on loan from Swiss Super League club Servette. Born in Switzerland, he is a youth international for Portugal.

== Club career ==
A youth product of Étoile Carouge and Servette, Varela debuted with Servette's reserves in 2024. On 2 October 2024 he signed his first professional contract with Servette until 2028. He made his senior and professional debut with Servette as a substitute in a 1–0 Swiss Super League loss to Lausanne-Spoer on 3 November 2024.

On 2 February 2026, Varela moved on loan to German 2. Bundesliga club Greuther Fürth, with an option to buy.

On 7 July 2026, he joined RKC Waalwijk in the Dutch Eredivisie, on loan with an option to buy.

== International career ==
Born in Switzerland, Varela is of Cape Verdean descent, and holds Portuguese citizenship through his mother's who lived in Portugal. He is a youth international for Portugal, having played for the Portugal U19s and U20s.

== Personal life ==
Varela's cousins Edimilson Fernandes, Ulisses Garcia, Joël Monteiro, Dylan Tavares, and Gelson Fernandes are all professional footballers. He is a childhood friend of Alvyn Sanches.
