= Frank Magri =

Footballer (born 1999)

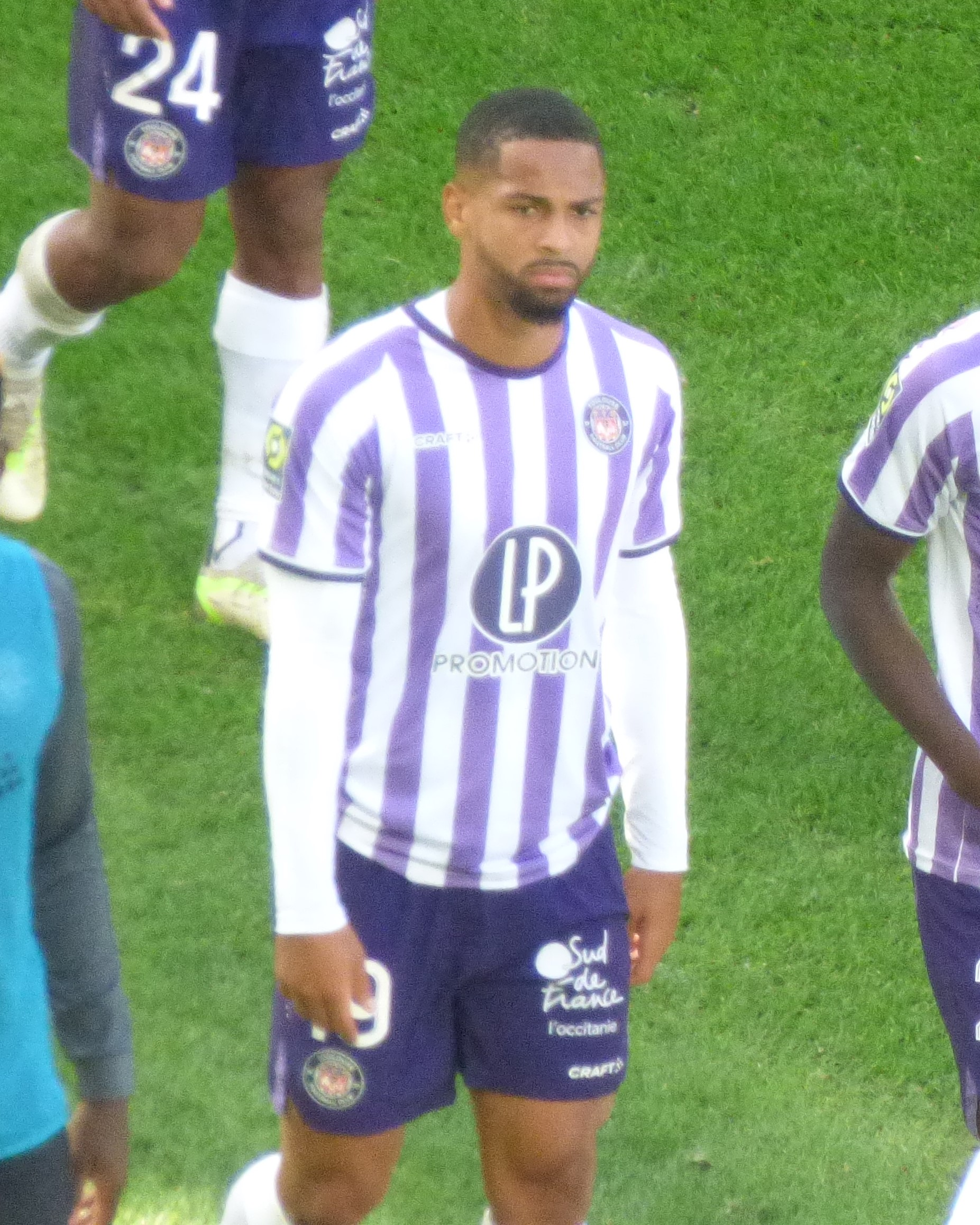
- Magri playing for Toulouse in 2023

Personal information
- Full name: Frank Mario Magri
- Date of birth: 4 September 1999 (age 27)
- Place of birth: Agen, France
- Height: 1.78 m (5 ft 10 in)
- Position: Forward

Youth career
- 2014–2017: Angers

Senior career*
Years	Team	Apps	(Gls)
2017–2022	Angers II	71	(26)
2022–2023	Bastia	36	(15)
2023–2026	Toulouse	77	(15)

International career^{‡}
2023–	Cameroon	20	(2)
- * Club domestic league appearances and goals as of 19 May 2026 ‡ National team caps and goals as of 9 January 2026

Frank Mario Magri (born 4 September 1999) is a professional footballer who plays as a forward. Born in France, he plays for the Cameroon national team.

== Club career ==
A youth product of Angers since the age of 15, Magri began his senior career with their reserves in 2019. He signed his first professional contract with the club on 16 August 2021. He transferred to the Ligue 2 side Bastia on 7 January 2022. He made his senior and professional debut with Bastia in a 1–1 (5–4) penalty shootout win over Reims on 29 January 2022, scoring his side's 4th penalty.

On 21 July 2023, Magri signed for Ligue 1 club Toulouse.

== International career ==
Magri was born in France to a French father and Cameroonian mother, and holds both nationalities. He was called up to the Cameroon national team for a set of friendlies in October 2023.

== Career statistics ==
=== Club ===
As of match played 13 December 2025

Appearances and goals by club, season and competition
Club	Season	League			National cup		League cup (Note: Includes Coupe de France)		Continental		Other		Total	
Club	Season	Division	Apps	Goals	Apps	Goals	Apps	Goals	Apps	Goals	Apps	Goals	Apps	Goals
Angers II	2016–17	National 3	5	3	—		—		—		—		5	3
Angers II	2017–18	National 3	9	2	—		—		—		—		9	2
Angers II	2018–19	National 3	18	6	—		—		—		—		18	6
Angers II	2019–20	CFA 2	17	6	—		—		—		—		17	6
Angers II	2020–21	CFA 2	9	3	—		—		—		—		9	3
Angers II	2021–22	CFA 2	13	6	—		—		—		—		13	6
Angers II	Total		71	26	—		—		—		—		71	26
Bastia	2021–22	Ligue 2	12	2	—		2	0	—		—		14	2
Bastia	2022–23	Ligue 2	24	13	—		1	0	—		—		25	13
Bastia	Total		36	15	—		3	0	—		—		39	15
Toulouse	2023–24	Ligue 1	29	5	0	0	—		8 (Note: Appearances in UEFA Europa League)	1	1 (Note: Appearance in Trophée des Champions)	0	38	6
Toulouse	2024–25	Ligue 1	31	5	3	0	—		—		—		34	5
Toulouse	2025–26	Ligue 1	16	4	0	0	—		—		—		16	4
Toulouse	Total		76	14	3	0	—		8	1	1	0	88	15
Career total			183	55	3	0	3	0	8	1	1	0	198	56

=== International ===
As of match played 9 January 2026

Appearances and goals by national team and year
National team	Year	Apps	Goals
Cameroon	2023	4	1
Cameroon	2024	8	1
Cameroon	2025	7	0
Cameroon	2026	1	0
Total		20	2

Scores and results list Cameroon's goal tally first, score column indicates score after each Magri goal.

List of international goals scored by Frank Magri
No.	Date	Venue	Opponent	Score	Result	Competition
1	17 November 2023	Japoma Stadium, Douala, Cameroon	Mauritius	3–0	3–0	2026 FIFA World Cup qualification
2	15 January 2024	Charles Konan Banny Stadium, Yamoussoukro, Ivory Coast	Guinea	1–1	1–1	2023 Africa Cup of Nations
