= Zhao Keyan =

Chinese pop singer and rapper (born 1983)

Zhao Kenyan
- Born: September 11, 1983 (age 42); Siping, Jilin, China
- Occupation: singer-songwriter
- Years active: 2014–present

Chinese name
Transcriptions
Standard Mandarin
- Hanyu Pinyin: Zhāo kēyán
Yue: Cantonese
- Jyutping: Ziu6 Fo1 Ngaam4
- Musical career
- Origin: China
- Genres: Pop music, Rap
- Instrument(s): Vocals, guitar
- Labels: Kingerom
- Website: Official weibo

Zhao Keyan (born September 11, 1983) is a Chinese pop singer and rapper. He started his music career in 2014. Since then, he has become a hit in mainland China with his dance song "She won't even give me a hundred yuan" and his albums have been released in Russia, Hong Kong and Taiwan.

== Personal life ==
Born on September 11, 1983, in a village in Siping, Jilin Province, China, Zhao Keyan dropped out of junior high school due to family financial reasons and started farming.

In 2009, he left his hometown to work. In his spare time at work, he learned singing skills and wrote his own music, and then he began participating in regional music competitions in 2010. In April 2010, he took part in the "2010 Super Boys" competition held by Hunan Satellite TV in Shenyang, and ranked among top 100 in Shenyang district.

== Music career ==
In April 2014, he produced and released his first music album, "Ada Love Song" at his own expense; in December, he wrote the dance song "She won't even give me a hundred yuan," for which he was nominated for the "Top 10 online Dance songs in China in 2014" . In December 2015, he released the song "what am I supposed to do". On the evening of June 30, 2016, Zhao Keyan's first solo concert was held at the Shandong Gymnasium, with very few fans.

In December 2017, he signed a contract with Golden pterosaur record and released a popular ballad single, "Mr. Zhao," which was released simultaneously in Russia, Taiwan, and other regions.

In March 2018, he released a personal rap single, "Those things in those years."

In July of the same year, he published the folk single "That hill."

Zhao Keyan performs the song "Mr. Zhao" at a concert in changchun, jilin province, China, March 1, 2019.

== Discography ==
=== Studio albums ===
- Ada Love Song (阿達情歌) (2014)
- Heartache, 2014 (心痛2014) (2014)

=== Singles ===
- She won't even give me a hundred yuan (一百塊錢都不給我) (2014) (Lyrics: Zhao Keyan, Music: Zhao Keyan)
- I want to sing (我要唱歌)(2014)(Lyrics: Yi Mailaiti, Music: Yi Mailaiti)
- Small beautiful (小美丽)(2014)(Lyrics: Zhao Keyan, Music: Zhao Keyan)
- Little cute (小可愛)(2014)(Lyrics: Zhao Keyan, Music: Zhao Keyan)
- What am I supposed to do (我該怎麼整) (2015) (Lyrics: Zhao Keyan, Music: Zhao Keyan)
- Mr. Zhao (2017) (趙先生)(Lyrics: Zhao Keyan, Music: Zhao Keyan)(Lyrics: Zhao Keyan, Music: Zhao Keyan)
- Those things in those years (那些年那些事兒) (2018)(Lyrics: Zhao Keyan, Music: Zhao Keyan, Mastering engineer:Ted Jensen)
- That hill (那一座山丘) (2018)(Lyrics: Zhao Keyan, Music: Zhao Keyan)

== Awards ==
Year	Nominee / work	Award	Result
2018	Mr. Zhao	Outstanding music award	Won

Year	Nominee / work	Award	Result
2018	Those things in those years	Outstanding music award	Won

== Concerts ==
Year	Concert	Date	City	Venue	Link
2019	2019 "ChangChun" stars concert	March 1	Chang Chun	Chang Chun	

Year	Concert	Date	City	Venue	Link
2018	2018 "CCTV" stars concert	November 5	Bei Jing	Bei Jing	

Year	Concert	Date	City	Venue	Link
2017	2017 "San Xiqingchong" stars concert	June 26	Shan Xi	Shan Xi	

Year	Concert	Date	City	Venue	Link
2016	Zhao Keyan's solo concert at shandong coliseum	June 30	Shan Dong	Shandong gymnasium	
