= Sébastien Salles-Lamonge =

French footballer (born 1996)

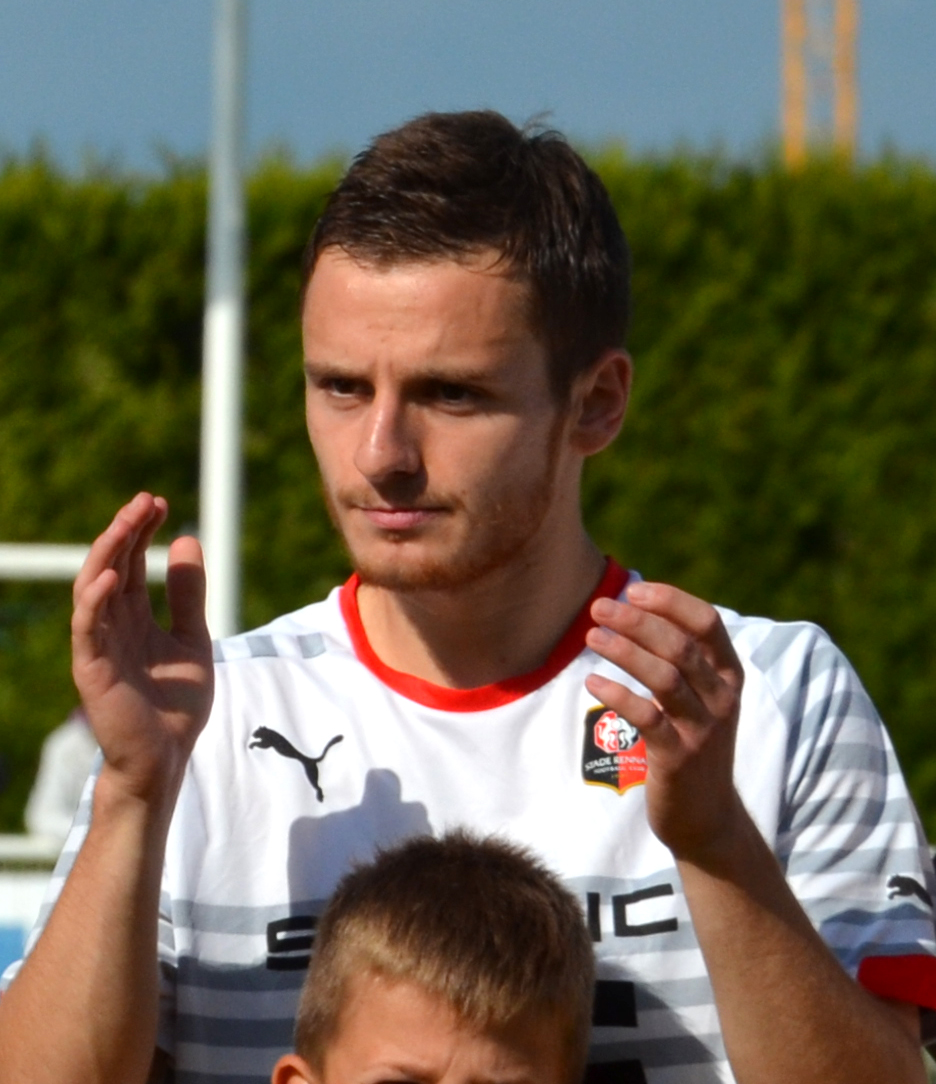
- Salles-Lamonge in 2015

Personal information
- Full name: Sébastien Antoine Luc Salles-Lamonge
- Date of birth: 28 January 1996 (age 30)
- Place of birth: Tarbes, France
- Height: 1.70 m (5 ft 7 in)
- Position: Attacking midfielder

Team information
- Current team: Atlético San Luis
- Number: 10

Youth career
- 2003–2007: Séméac OF
- 2007–2011: Tarbes Pyrénées Football
- 2011–2016: Rennes

Senior career*
Years	Team	Apps	(Gls)
2014–2018	Rennes II	58	(15)
2016–2018	Rennes	3	(0)
2016–2017	→ Le Havre (loan)	14	(0)
2016–2017	→ Le Havre II (loan)	14	(7)
2018–2019	Deportivo B	15	(0)
2019–2023	Bastia	121	(14)
2023–	Atlético San Luis	110	(24)

International career
2013	France U18	2	(0)
2016	France U20	4	(1)
- * Club domestic league appearances and goals as of 27 September 2026

Sébastien Antoine Luc Salles-Lamonge (born 28 January 1996) is a French professional footballer who plays as a midfielder for Liga MX club Atlético San Luis.

== Club career ==
Salles-Lamonge is a youth exponent from Stade Rennais. He made his first-team – and Ligue 1 – debut on 12 February 2016, starting and playing the entire first-half in a 1–0 home defeat of SCO Angers.

On 16 August 2016, months after signing a professional contract with Rennes, Salles-Lamonge joined Ligue 2 side Le Havre AC on loan for the season. On 18 August 2018, he moved abroad after signing a one-year contract with Deportivo de La Coruña and being assigned to the reserves in Segunda División B.

In May 2019 Salles-Lamonge returned to France, signing a one-year contract, with a further year option, with SC Bastia.
