= Stade des Antonins =

Stadium in Nîmes, France

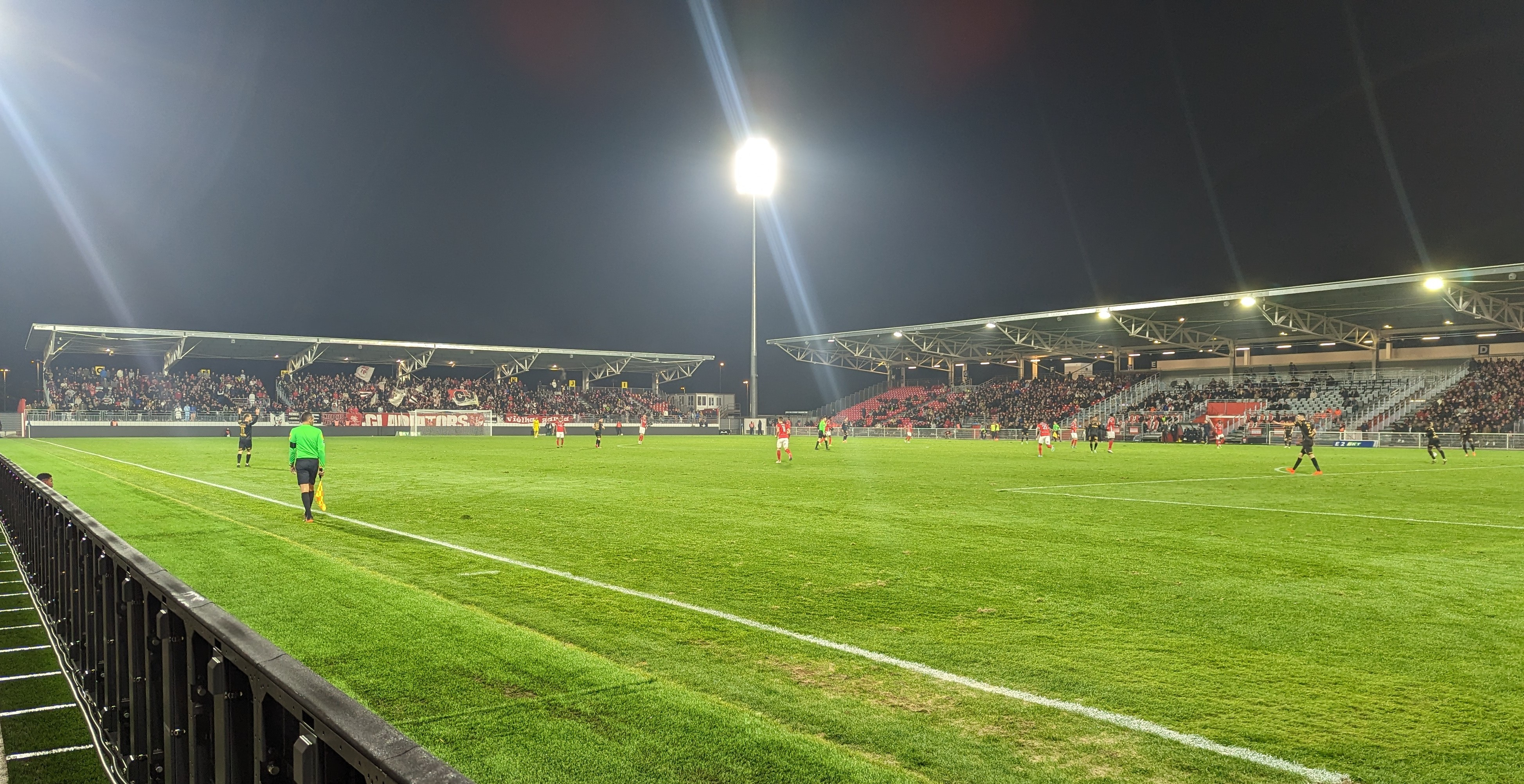
- The stadium during its opening match
- Interactive map of Stade des Antonins
- Location: Avenue Claude Baillet; 30900 Nîmes, Occitania, France
- Coordinates: 43°48′39″N 4°21′23″E
- Owner: SAS Nemau
- Operator: Nîmes Olympique
- Capacity: 8,033
- Surface: Hybrid grass

Construction
- Built: May 2022–December 2022
- Opened: 26 December 2022
- Construction cost: €10 million
- Architect: Valode & Pistre

Tenants
- Nîmes Olympique (2022–present)

The Stade des Antonins is a stadium located in Nîmes, France. It has been the home ground of football club Nîmes Olympique since December 2022. The club began playing at the stadium following the closure of the Stade des Costières, in order to pave the way for the construction of the Stade Nemausus, initially hoped to be completed by 2026.

In July 2021, the municipality signed the building permit for the temporary stadium and commissioned INRAP to begin archaeological excavations on the site.
