= Yohan Baï =

French footballer (born 1996)

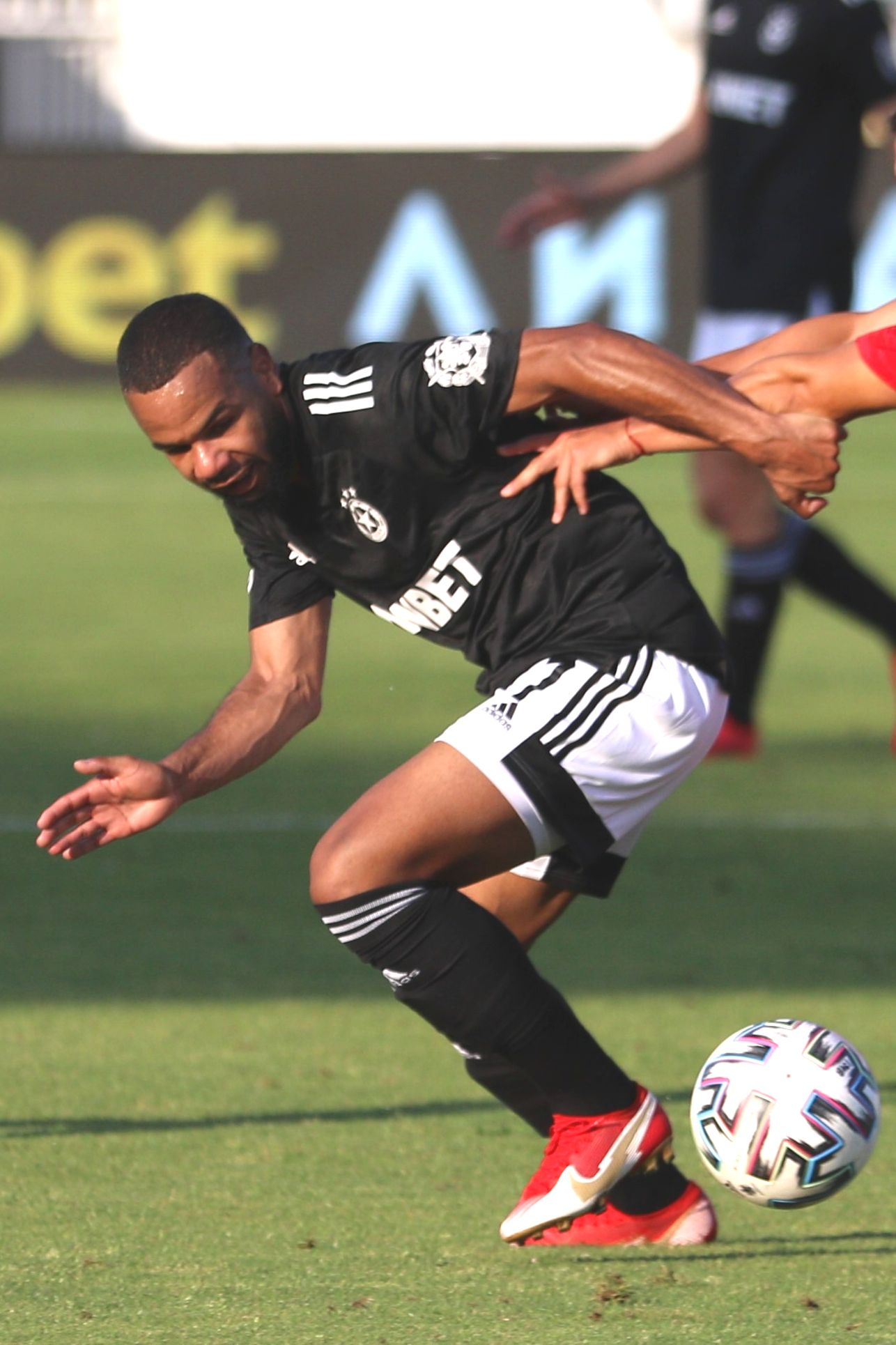
- Baï with CSKA Sofia in 2021

Personal information
- Date of birth: 28 September 1996 (age 30)
- Place of birth: Arras, France
- Height: 1.81 m (5 ft 11 in)
- Positions: Right midfielder; winger

Team information
- Current team: HFX Wanderers
- Number: 19

Senior career*
Years	Team	Apps	(Gls)
2014–2016	Amiens B	8	(1)
2016–2018	SAS Épinal	38	(2)
2018–2019	Furiani-Agliani	25	(8)
2019–2020	Oissel	12	(1)
2020–2021	Canet Roussillon	9	(0)
2021–2022	CSKA Sofia	23	(3)
2022–2024	Bastia	15	(3)
2023–2024	Bastia B	3	(0)
2024	Lokomotiv Plovdiv	5	(0)
2025–	HFX Wanderers	36	(3)
- * Club domestic league appearances and goals as of 26 October 2026

Yohan Baï (born 28 September 1996) is a French professional footballer who plays as a midfielder for the HFX Wanderers in the Canadian Premier League.

== Career ==
=== Canet Roussillon ===
During summer 2020, Baï joined French side Canet Roussillon. The most famous moment in his career for the French side was the goal in the net of Marseille, with which the fourth division club eliminated Ligue 1 giants from the cup.

=== CSKA Sofia ===
On 28 May 2021, Baï joined Bulgarian First League side CSKA Sofia signing his first professional contract.

=== Bastia ===
On 22 July 2022, he signed a contract with Bastia for two seasons with an option for a third.

=== Lokomotiv Plovdiv ===
On 31 January 2024, Baï returned to Bulgaria and signed with Lokomotiv Plovdiv until the end of the season, with an option for the 2024–25 season.

=== HFX Wanderers ===
In January 2025, he signed a two-year contract with an option for 2027 with the HFX Wanderers of the Canadian Premier League.

== Personal life ==
Born in France, Baï holds Ivorian and French nationalities.

== Career statistics ==
=== Club ===
As of 1 July 2023

Appearances and goals by club, season and competition
Club	Season	League			Cup		Europe		Other		Total	
Club	Season	Division	Apps	Goals	Apps	Goals	Apps	Goals	Apps	Goals	Apps	Goals
CSKA Sofia	2021–22	First League	23	3	3	0	7	0	1	0	34	3
Bastia	2022–23	Ligue 2	14	3	1	0	–		–		15	3
Career total			37	6	4	0	7	0	1	0	49	6
