= Dylan Tavares =

Footballer (born 1996)

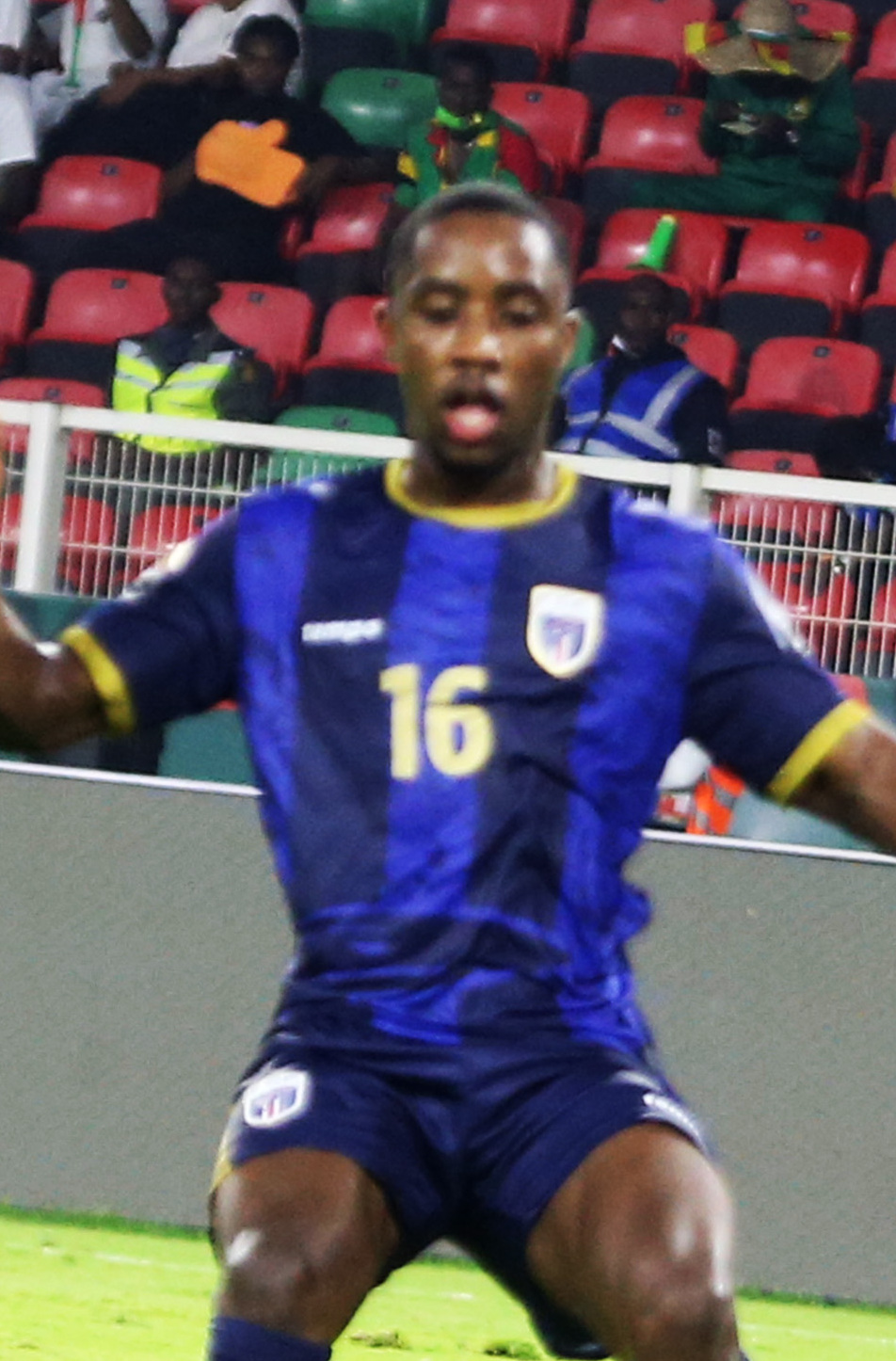
- Tavares in 2022

Personal information
- Full name: Dylan Tavares dos Santos
- Date of birth: 30 August 1996 (age 30)
- Place of birth: Geneva, Switzerland
- Height: 1.72 m (5 ft 8 in)
- Position: Left-back

Team information
- Current team: Sochaux
- Number: 24

Senior career*
Years	Team	Apps	(Gls)
2013–2014	Étoile Carouge	1	(0)
2014–2015	Stade Nyonnais	33	(1)
2016	Étoile Carouge	8	(0)
2016–2017	Servette U21	19	(0)
2017–2018	Yverdon	24	(1)
2018–2021	Stade Lausanne	70	(4)
2021–2022	Xamax	23	(0)
2022–2025	Bastia	64	(3)
2025	Bastia B	2	(0)
2025–	Sochaux	28	(0)

International career^{‡}
2020–	Cape Verde	20	(1)
- * Club domestic league appearances and goals as of 23 June 2026 ‡ National team caps and goals as of 7 September 2021

Dylan Tavares dos Santos (born 30 August 1996) is a professional footballer who plays as a left-back for French Ligue 2 club Sochaux. Born in Switzerland, he plays for the Cape Verde national team.

== Club career ==
On 23 July 2021, Tavares joined Xamax on a one-year contract.

On 29 May 2022, he agreed to join Bastia in France for the 2022–23 season.

On 30 June 2025, Tavares signed a two-season contract with Sochaux in the third-tier Championnat National.

== International career ==
Furtado was born in Switzerland and is of Cape Verdean descent. He was called up to the represent the Cape Verde for a set of friendlies in October 2020. He debuted for Cape Verde in a 2–1 friendly win over Andorra on 7 October 2020. He was named in the roster for the 2021 Africa cup of nations when the team reached the round of 16.

== Personal life ==
Tavares' cousins Edimilson Fernandes, Ulisses Garcia, Joël Monteiro, Keyan Varela, and Gelson Fernandes are all professional footballers.

== Career statistics ==
Scores and results list Cape Verde's goal tally first, score column indicates score after each Tavares goal.

List of international goals scored by Dylan Tavares
No.	Date	Venue	Opponent	Score	Result	Competition
1	7 September 2021	Estádio Municipal Adérito Sena, Mindelo, Cape Verde	Nigeria	1–0	1–2	2022 FIFA World Cup qualification
