= Dominique Guidi =

French footballer (born 1996)

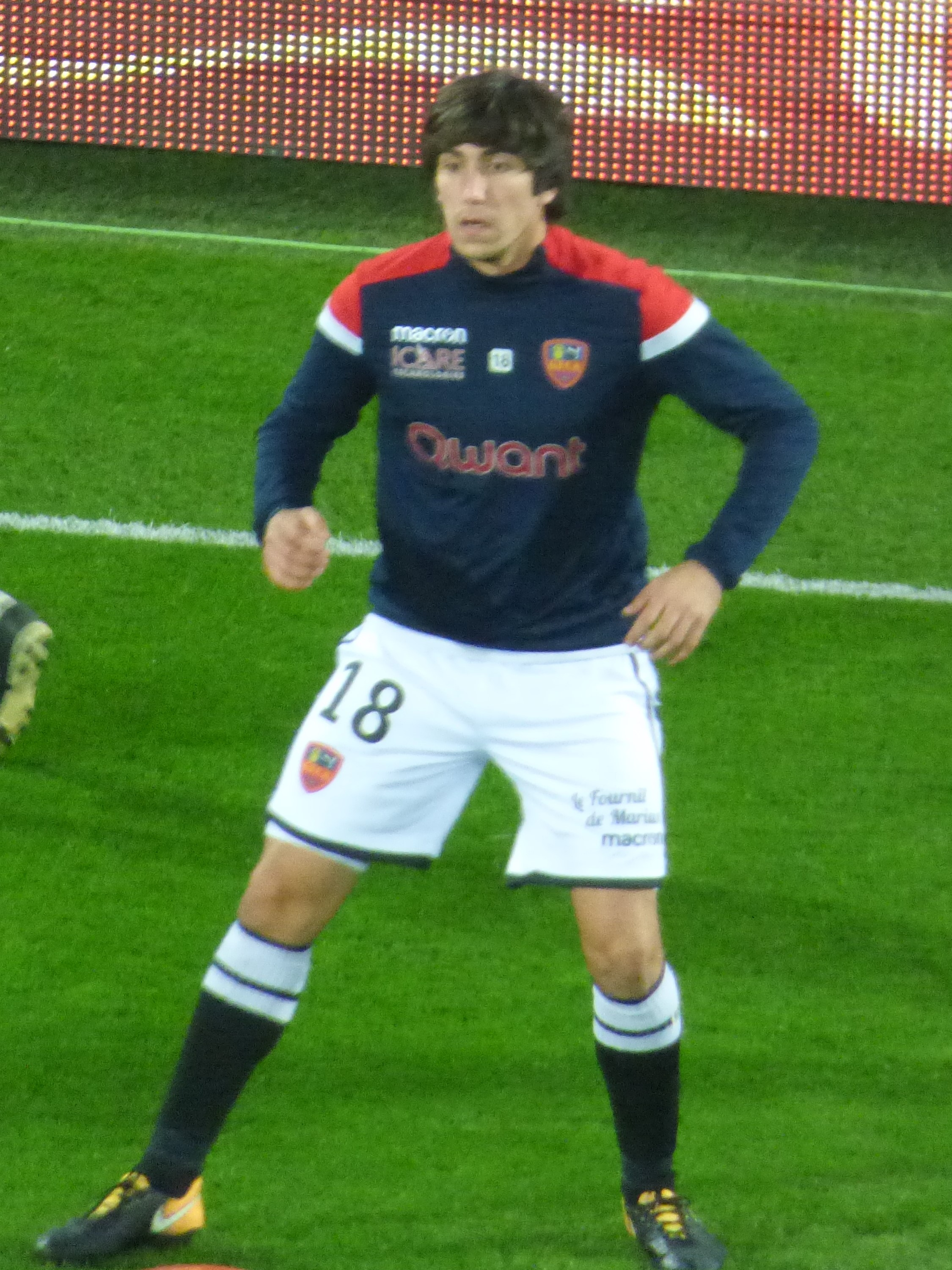
- Guidi in 2018

Personal information
- Date of birth: 6 February 1996 (age 30)
- Place of birth: Porto-Vecchio, France
- Height: 1.77 m (5 ft 10 in)
- Position: Centre back

Senior career*
Years	Team	Apps	(Gls)
2014–2015	Bastia II	2	(0)
2015–2016	Borgo	2	(0)
2016–2018	Furiani-Agliani	43	(6)
2018–2020	Gazélec Ajaccio	59	(2)
2020–2026	Bastia	121	(7)
- * Club domestic league appearances and goals as of 12 May 2026

Dominique Guidi (born 6 February 1996) is a French professional footballer who plays as a centre-back.

== Career ==
On 1 June 2018, Guidi signed a two-year contract with Gazélec Ajaccio. He made his professional debut for Gazélec Ajaccio in a 1–1 Ligue 2 tie with Paris FC on 27 July 2018. He scored his first goal in Ligue 2 against Red Star on 31 August 2018, offering victory to his team.

In May 2020, SC Bastia, newly promoted to the Championnat National, announced Guidi as their first signing for the 2020–21 season. He agreed a two-year contract with the club.
