= Tom Ducrocq =

French footballer (born 1999)

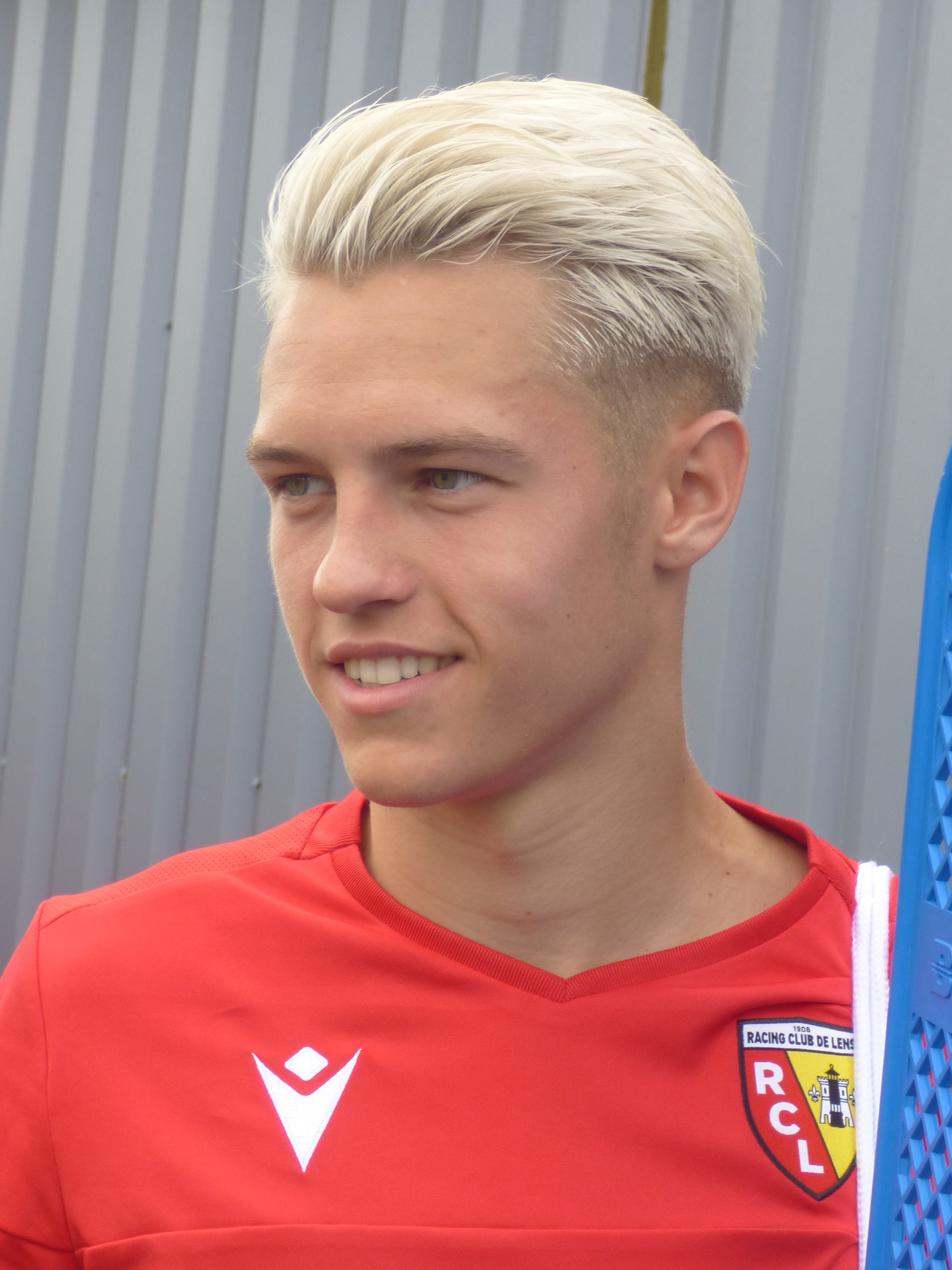
- Ducrocq in 2019

Personal information
- Date of birth: 25 August 1999 (age 27)
- Place of birth: Nordausques, France
- Height: 1.76 m (5 ft 9 in)
- Position: Midfielder

Team information
- Current team: Guingamp
- Number: 25

Youth career
- –2008: FC Nordausques
- 2008–2012: US Saint-Omer
- 2012–2019: Lens

Senior career*
Years	Team	Apps	(Gls)
2016–2023	Lens II	53	(2)
2020–2022	→ Bastia (loan)	47	(0)
2022–2023	→ Bastia (loan)	32	(1)
2023–2026	Bastia	95	(4)
2026–	Guingamp	5	(0)
- * Club domestic league appearances and goals as of 5 September 2026

Tom Ducrocq (born 25 August 1999) is a French professional footballer who plays as a midfielder for Ligue 2 club Guingamp.

== Career ==
In May 2019, Ducrocq signed his first professional contract with RC Lens for three years. He made his professional debut with Lens in a 2–1 Coupe de la Ligue win over Troyes AC on 13 August 2019.

In 2020 Ducrocq moved to Bastia on a two-year loan. In July 2022, he joined the club for a third season, again on loan.
