= Migouel Alfarela =

French footballer (born 1997)

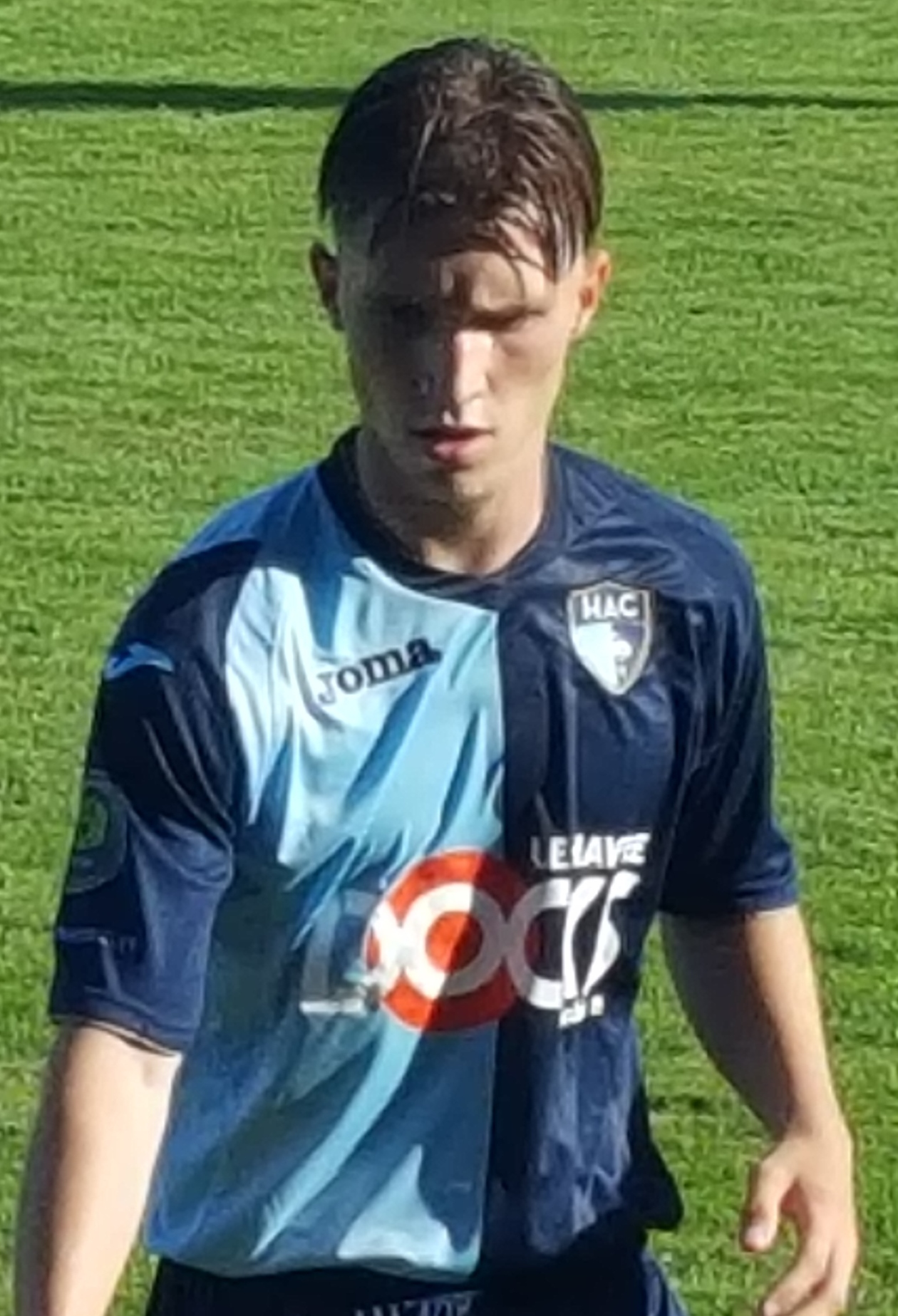
- Alfarela in 2016

Personal information
- Full name: Allan Migouel Alfarela
- Date of birth: 15 February 1997 (age 29)
- Place of birth: Montivilliers, France
- Height: 1.73 m (5 ft 8 in)
- Position: Forward

Team information
- Current team: Aris
- Number: 19

Youth career
- 2004–2015: Le Havre

Senior career*
Years	Team	Apps	(Gls)
2015–2018	Le Havre II	69	(19)
2018–2019	Gonfreville	2	(0)
2019–2021	Annecy	57	(19)
2021–2022	Paris FC	31	(3)
2022–2024	SC Bastia	69	(15)
2024–2025	Legia Warsaw	17	(2)
2025	→ Athens Kallithea (loan)	17	(9)
2025–	Aris	12	(0)
- * Club domestic league appearances and goals as of 19 September 2026

Migouel Alfarela (born 15 February 1997) is a French professional footballer who plays as a forward for Greek Super League club Aris.

== Career ==
Alfarela joined the youth academy of Le Havre at the age of 7, and stayed with them for almost 15 years before being released without signing a professional contract. Alfarela started working in construction, and briefly gave up on football. However, in 2019 he signed with Annecy FC in the Championnat National 2 and helped them get promoted as a mainstay on the team. On 8 July 2021, he signed his first professional contract with Paris FC until June 2023. He made his professional debut with Paris FC in a 4–0 league win over Grenoble on 24 July 2021, scoring a goal. On 28 June 2022, he was transferred to SC Bastia with whom he signed a contract for the next two seasons plus one in option.

On 24 July 2024, Alfarela signed a three-year contract with Polish Ekstraklasa club Legia Warsaw.

On 22 January 2025, he joined Greek side Athens Kallithea on loan for the rest of the 2024–25 season. He returned to Legia at the end of the 2024–25 season.

On 12 September 2025, Alfarela joined Greek Super League side Aris, signing a three-year contract.

== Personal life ==
Born in France, Alfarela is of Portuguese descent.

== Honours ==
Legia Warsaw

- Polish Super Cup: 2025
