= Anthony Roncaglia =

French footballer (born 2000)

Personal information
- Full name: Anthony Roncaglia
- Date of birth: 30 August 2000 (age 26)
- Place of birth: Bastia, France
- Height: 1.80 m (5 ft 11 in)
- Position: Centre-back

Team information
- Current team: Bastia
- Number: 4

Senior career*
Years	Team	Apps	(Gls)
2017–2019	Bastia	3	(0)
2019	Ajaccio B	6	(0)
2019–	Bastia	115	(3)
- * Club domestic league appearances and goals as of 12 May 2026

Anthony Roncaglia (born 30 August 2000) is a French professional footballer who plays as centre-back for Ligue 3 club Bastia.

== Honours ==
Bastia

- Championnat National 3: 2018–19
- Championnat National: 2020–21
