= Thibaut Vargas =

French footballer (born 2000)

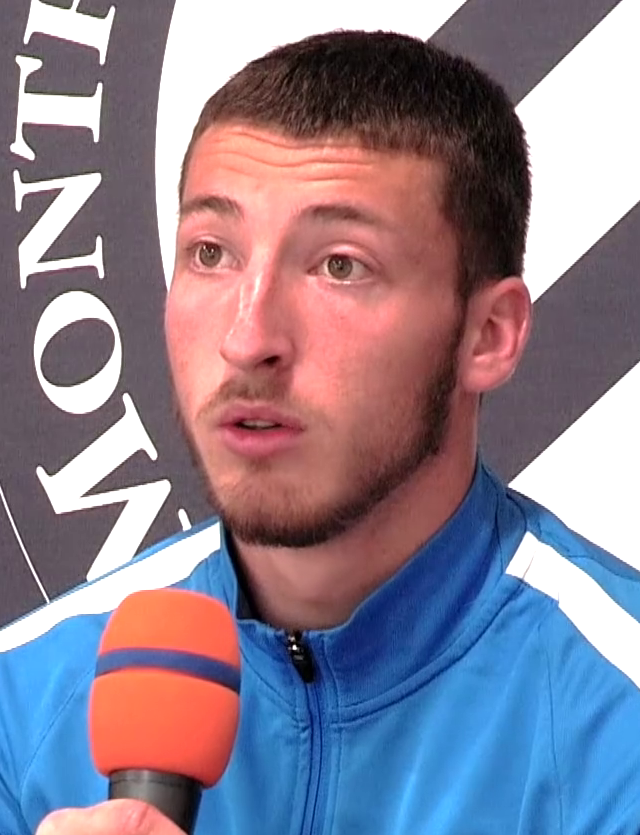
- Vargas with Montpellier in 2019

Personal information
- Date of birth: 22 May 2000 (age 26)
- Place of birth: Aix-en-Provence, France
- Height: 1.75 m (5 ft 9 in)
- Position: Right-back

Youth career
- 2015–2019: Montpellier

Senior career*
| Years | Team | Apps | (Gls) |
| 2018–2021 | Montpellier B | 20 | (1) |
| 2020–2021 | Montpellier | 3 | (0) |
| 2021 | → Châteauroux (loan) | 16 | (0) |
| 2021–2022 | Châteauroux | 24 | (3) |
| 2022–2023 | Nîmes | 25 | (1) |
| 2023–2026 | Laval | 97 | (4) |
- * Club domestic league appearances and goals as of 12 May 2026

Thibaut Vargas (born 22 May 2000) is a French professional footballer who plays as a right-back.

== Career ==
Vargas signed his first professional contract with Montpellier on 20 December 2019. He made his professional debut with the club in a 5–0 Coupe de France win over Caen on 19 January 2020.

In June 2022, Vargas signed a one-year contract with Nîmes, with an option to extend for two more years.

In July 2023, Vargas was released from his contract by Nîmes and signed a two-years contract with Laval, with an option to extend for one more year.
