= Kylian Kaïboué =

French footballer (born 1998)

Personal information
- Full name: Kylian Kaïboué
- Date of birth: 20 August 1998 (age 28)
- Place of birth: Firminy, France
- Height: 1.82 m (6 ft 0 in)
- Position: Midfielder

Team information
- Current team: Iraklis
- Number: 22

Senior career*
Years	Team	Apps	(Gls)
2015–2021	Montpellier B	69	(10)
2020–2021	→ Sète (loan)	27	(1)
2021–2023	Bastia	61	(3)
2023–2026	Amiens	88	(5)
2026–	Iraklis	4	(0)
- * Club domestic league appearances and goals as of 12 September 2026

Kylian Kaïboué (born 20 August 1998) is a French professional footballer who plays as a midfielder for Super League Greece club Iraklis.

== Career ==
On 23 June 2026, Kylian moved abroad for the first time in his career, signing a two-year contract with Superleague club Iraklis.

== Personal life ==
Born in France, Kaïboué holds French and Algerian nationalities.

== Career statistics ==
As of 5 July 2026

Club	Season	League			Cup		Continental		Other		Total	
Club	Season	Division	Apps	Goals	Apps	Goals	Apps	Goals	Apps	Goals	Apps	Goals
Sète (loan)	2020–21	Ligue 3	27	1	1	0	—		—		28	1
Bastia	2021–22	Ligue 2	30	1	2	0	—		—		32	1
Bastia	2022–23	Ligue 2	31	2	3	0	—		—		34	2
Bastia	Total		61	2	5	0	—		—		66	3
Amiens	2023–24	Ligue 2	31	0	1	0	—		—		32	0
Amiens	2024–25	Ligue 2	26	3	1	0	—		—		27	3
Amiens	2025–26	Ligue 2	31	2	5	2	—		—		36	4
Amiens	Total		88	5	7	2	—		—		95	7
Career total			176	9	13	2	0	0	0	0	189	11

== Honours ==
Montpellier U19

- Coupe Gambardella: 2016–17

Montpellier B

- Championnat National 3: 2018–19
