= Jean N'Guessan (footballer) =

Ivorian footballer

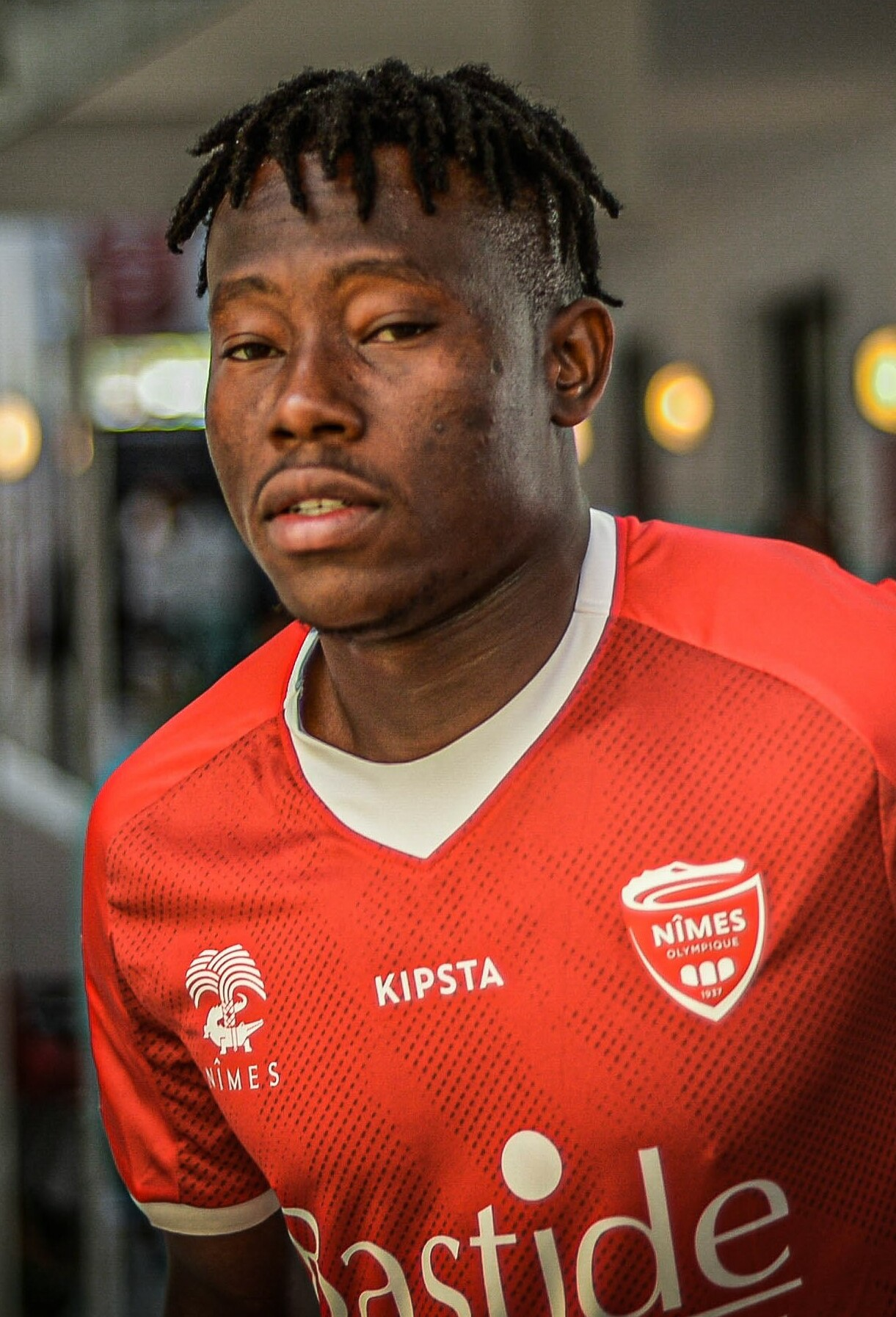
- N'Guessan in 2022.

Personal information
- Full name: Jean Frederic Kouadio N'Guessan
- Date of birth: 17 April 2003 (age 23)
- Place of birth: Daloa, Ivory Coast
- Height: 1.77 m (5 ft 10 in)
- Position: Midfielder

Team information
- Current team: Khor Fakkan (on loan from Al Wasl)
- Number: 79

Youth career
- RC Abidjan

Senior career*
Years	Team	Apps	(Gls)
2019–2021	RC Abidjan	52	(9)
2021–2023	Nice	0	(0)
2021–2022	→ Lausanne-Sport (loan)	23	(0)
2022–2023	→ Nîmes (loan)	35	(2)
2023–2024	Metz	6	(0)
2023–2024	Metz B	1	(0)
2024–	Al Wasl	11	(0)
2026–	→ Khor Fakkan (loan)	1	(0)

International career^{‡}
2023–	Ivory Coast U23	1	(0)
- * Club domestic league appearances and goals as of 10:28, 12 February 2024 (UTC) ‡ National team caps and goals as of 06:59, 31 March 2023 (UTC)

Jean Frederic Kouadio N'Guessan (born 17 April 2003) is an Ivorian professional footballer who plays as a midfielder for Emirati club Khor Fakkan, on loan from Al Wasl.

== Career ==
In 2021, N'Guessan was sent on loan to Swiss side Lausanne-Sport from Nice in the French Ligue 1. On 24 July 2021, he debuted for Lausanne-Sport during a 2–1 loss to St. Gallen.

In July 2022, N'Guessan moved on loan to Nîmes for the 2022–23 season.

On 21 July 2023, he signed a 4-year contract with Ligue 1 club Metz.

In February 2024, N'Guessan joined UAE Pro League side Al Wasl on a permanent deal.

On 3 February 2026, N'Guessan joined UAE Pro League side Khor Fakkan on loan.

== International career ==
N'Guessan was called up to the Ivory Coast national U23 football team in March 2023. He made his international debut in a 3-2 won against the Morocco U-23 on 22 March 2023.
