= Kevin Van Den Kerkhof =

Footballer (born 1996)

Personal information
- Full name: Kevin Daniel Van Den Kerkhof Guitoun
- Date of birth: 14 March 1996 (age 30)
- Place of birth: Maubeuge, France
- Height: 1.90 m (6 ft 3 in)
- Position: Right-back

Team information
- Current team: Charleroi
- Number: 3

Youth career
- Valenciennes

Senior career*
Years	Team	Apps	(Gls)
2014–2015	Aulnoye	6	(0)
2015–2016	Lorient B	4	(0)
2016–2017	Feignies Aulnoye	20	(0)
2017–2019	La Louvière	55	(12)
2019–2020	Olympic Charleroi	23	(5)
2020–2022	F91 Dudelange	59	(16)
2022–2023	Bastia	41	(5)
2023–	Metz	43	(3)
2025–2026	→ Charleroi (loan)	30	(3)
2026–	Charleroi	5	(2)

International career^{‡}
2023–	Algeria	10	(0)
- * Club domestic league appearances and goals as of 31 May 2026 ‡ National team caps and goals as of 6 June 2024 (UTC)

Kevin Daniel Van Den Kerkhof Guitoun (Arabic: كيفن دانيال فان دين كيرخوف ڨيطون; born 14 March 1996), known as Kevin Guitoun (Arabic: كيفن ڨيطون) in Algeria, is a professional footballer who plays as a right-back for Belgian Pro League club Charleroi. Born in France, he plays for the Algeria national team.

== Club career ==
A youth product of Valenciennes, Van Den Kerkhof began his footballing career with Aulnoye in 2014, before moving to the reserves of Lorient in 2015. After a big injury he returned to Feignies Aulnoye, before moving to Belgium with La Louvière in 2017. In 2019, he moved to the Belgian National Division 1 club Olympic Charleroi. After one season there, he transferred to the Luxembourgish club F91 Dudelange, where he scored 17 goals and had 13 assist in two seasons. On 12 May 2022, he returned to France with Ligue 2 club Bastia. He made his professional debut in a 2–0 Ligue 2 loss to Laval on 30 July 2022. In his first season at the club, Van Den Kerkhof was named in the UNFP Ligue 2 Team of the Year.

On 20 August 2025, Van Den Kerkhof was loaned by Charleroi in Belgium, with an option to buy.

== International career ==
Born in Maubeuge, Van Den Kerkhof was born to an Algerian father and French mother. He was called up to the Algerian squad for the first time in March 2023 and made his debut in a 1–0 Africa Cup of Nations qualifier against Niger on 27 March.

In December 2023, he was named in Algeria's squad for the 2023 Africa Cup of Nations.

== Personal life ==
Van Den Kerkhof uses the name Kevin Guitoun in Algeria. He is a close friend of French international Benjamin Pavard, having been born a couple of weeks before in the same small town of Maubeuge.

== Honours ==
La Louvière

- Belgian Second Amateur Division: 2018–19

F91 Dudelange

- Luxembourg National Division: 2021–22; runner-up: 2020–21
- Luxembourg Cup runner-up: 2021–22

Individual

- UNFP Ligue 2 Team of the Year: 2022–23
