= Benjamin Santelli =

French footballer (born 1991)

Personal information
- Date of birth: 16 November 1991 (age 34)
- Place of birth: Bastia, France
- Height: 1.80 m (5 ft 11 in)
- Position: Winger

Youth career
- 2009–2010: Bastia

Senior career*
Years	Team	Apps	(Gls)
2010–2014	Balagne		
2014–2016	CA Bastia	54	(3)
2016–2017	Chambly	17	(1)
2017–2018	Bastia-Borgo	13	(2)
2017	Bastia-Borgo B	2	(0)
2018–2019	Bastia	22	(16)
2019–2020	Chambly	10	(2)
2020–2024	Bastia	116	(25)
2024–2025	Ajaccio	23	(1)
- * Club domestic league appearances and goals as of 12 May 2025

Benjamin Santelli (born 16 November 1991) is a French professional footballer who plays as a winger.

== Career ==
On 28 May 2019, Santelli signed professionally with Ligue 2 side FC Chambly after years of playing in non-professional teams in his native Corsica. He made his professional debut with Chambly in a 1–0 league win over Valenciennes on 26 July 2019, scoring the game-winning goal and the first ever for Chambly in the division. A few days into the season, he sustained a cruciate ligament injury.

After one season with Chambly, Santelli returned to former club SC Bastia, newly promoted to Championnat National. He agreed a two-year contract with the option of a further year.
