= 2020–21 Chamois Niortais F.C. season =

Niort
2020–21 season
- Chairman: Karim Fradin
- Manager: Sébastien Desabre
- Stadium: Stade René Gaillard
- Ligue 2: 18th
- Coupe de France: Eighth round
- Top goalscorer: League: Pape Ibnou Bâ (14); All: Pape Ibnou Bâ (14)
Home colours	Away colours	Third colours

The 2020–21 Chamois Niortais F.C. season was the club's 96th season in existence and its seventh consecutive season in the second flight of French football. In addition to the domestic league, Niort participated in this season's edition of the Coupe de France. The season covered the period from 1 July 2020 to 30 June 2021.

== Players ==
=== First-team squad ===
As of 14 October 2020.

Note: Flags indicate national team as defined under FIFA eligibility rules; some limited exceptions apply. Players may hold more than one non-FIFA nationality.

No.	Pos.	Nation	Player
1	GK	FRA	Mathieu Michel
3	DF	CMR	Darlin Yongwa
5	DF	CMR	Guy Kilama
6	MF	FRA	Dylan Louiserre (captain)
7	MF	BEN	David Djigla
8	MF	FRA	Olivier Kemen
9	FW	MLI	Ibrahim Sissoko
10	MF	FRA	Valentin Jacob
11	FW	SEN	Pape Ibnou Bâ
12	FW	GBS	Joseph Mendes
15	DF	GUI	Ibrahima Conté
16	GK	FRA	Yanis Maronne
17	MF	GAB	Louis Ameka
18	FW	FRA	Goduine Koyalipou
19	DF	FRA	Brahima Doukansy
20	FW	FRA	Antoine Baroan

No.	Pos.	Nation	Player
21	DF	FRA	Lenny Vallier
22	MF	FRA	Quentin Bena
23	MF	FRA	Tom Lebeau
24	MF	COM	Yacine Bourhane
25	MF	FRA	Bilal Boutobba
26	MF	FRA	Brahim Konaté
27	DF	FRA	Bryan Passi
28	DF	BFA	Issouf Paro
29	DF	FRA	Joris Moutachy
30	GK	FRA	Quentin Braat
34	MF	MTQ	Samuel Renel
36	DF	FRA	Gabin Delguel
37	MF	FRA	Yassine Benhattab
38	DF	FRA	Bradley Matufueni
40	GK	SGP	Emyl Leclercq

== Pre-season and friendlies ==
Win Draw Loss

22 July 2020 Friendly	Châteauroux (France)	Cancelled	(France) Niort	Châteauroux, France
14:00 CEST (UTC+2)				Stadium: Stade Gaston Petit

25 July 2020 Friendly	Niort (France)	0–1	(France) Stade Laval	Niort, France
18:00 CEST (UTC+2)		Report	Robinet 45'	Stadium: Stade René Gaillard

29 July 2020 Friendly	Stade Briochin (France)	2–1	(France) Niort	Ploufragan, France
19:00 CEST (UTC+2)	Mbock 60'; Blondel 88'	Report	Lebeau 64'	Stadium: Centre Technique Régional Henri Guérin

8 August 2020 Friendly	Pau (France)	0–0	(France) Niort	Saint-Médard-en-Jalles, France
19:00 CEST (UTC+2)		Report		Stadium: Stade Robert Monseau

11 August 2020 Friendly	Niort (France)	0–0	(France) Cholet	Niort, France
11:00 CEST (UTC+2)		Report		Stadium: Stade René Gaillard

15 August 2020 Friendly	Toulouse (France)	1–2	(France) Niort	Villenave-d'Ornon, France
19:00 CEST (UTC+2)	Antiste 60'	Report	Bâ 8'; Koyalipou 27'	Stadium: Stade Alain-Roche

5 September 2020 Friendly	Lorient (France)	3–1	(France) Niort	Sarzeau, France
15:00 CEST (UTC+2)	Monconduit 27'; Wissa 37'; Marveaux 43'		Koyalipou 54'

13 November 2020 Friendly	Angers (France)	3–3	(France) Niort	Angers, France
15:00 CET (UTC+1)	Diony 19'; Alioui 69'; Cho 78'	Report	Kemen 1'; Baroan 57'; Boutobba 83'	Stadium: Stade Raymond Kopa; Attendance: 0

== Competitions ==
=== Overview ===
Competition	First match	Last match	Starting round	Final position	Record							
Competition	First match	Last match	Starting round	Final position	Pld	W	D	L	GF	GA	GD	Win %
Ligue 2	22 August 2020	15 May 2021	Matchday 1	18th	38	9	14	15	34	58	−24	23.68
Ligue 2 relegation play-offs	19 May 2021	22 May 2021	First leg	Winners	2	1	0	1	3	3	+0	50.00
Coupe de France	20 January 2021		Eighth round	Eighth round	1	0	0	1	0	1	−1	0.00
Total					41	10	14	17	37	62	−25	24.39

Source: Soccerway

=== Ligue 2 ===
==== League table ====
Pos	Team	Pld	W	D	L	GF	GA	GD	Pts	Promotion or Relegation
16	Dunkerque	38	10	11	17	34	47	−13	41	
17	Caen	38	9	14	15	34	49	−15	41	
18	Niort (O)	38	9	14	15	34	58	−24	41	Qualification for the relegation play-offs
19	Chambly (R)	38	9	11	18	41	64	−23	38	Relegation to Championnat National
20	Châteauroux (R)	38	4	11	23	32	58	−26	23	Relegation to Championnat National

Source: Ligue 2
Rules for classification: 1) Points; 2) Goal difference; 3) Number of goals scored; 4) Head-to-head goal difference; 5) Fair play points
(O) Play-off winners; (R) Relegated

==== Results summary ====
Overall								Home						Away					
Pld	W	D	L	GF	GA	GD	Pts	W	D	L	GF	GA	GD	W	D	L	GF	GA	GD
38	9	14	15	34	58	−24	41	6	6	7	17	25	−8	3	8	8	17	33	−16

Source: Ligue 2

==== Results by round ====
Round	1	2	3	4	5	6	7	8	9	10	11	12	13	14	15	16	17	18	19	20	21	22	23	24	25	26	27	28	29	30	31	32	33	34	35	36	37	38
Ground	A	H	H	A	H	A	H	A	H	A	H	A	H	A	H	A	H	A	H	A	A	H	A	H	A	H	A	H	A	H	A	H	A	H	A	H	A	H
Result	W	D	W	W	D	L	W	L	D	W	L	L	W	L	W	L	L	D	L	D	D	D	D	D	L	W	D	L	L	W	D	L	L	L	D	D	D	L
Position	7	4	1	1	1	5	2	4	7	3	7	10	7	8	7	8	9	9	11	12	11	11	12	12	13	12	8	13	15	12	13	14	14	15	15	17	16	18

Source: Ligue 2
A = Away; H = Home; W = Win; D = Draw; L = Loss

==== Matches ====
The league fixtures were announced on 9 July 2020.

22 August 2020 1	Guingamp	0–1	Niort	Guingamp
19:00 CEST (UTC+2)		Report	Bâ 39'	Stadium: Stade de Roudourou; Referee: Bastien Dechepy

29 August 2020 2	Niort	1–1	Chambly	Niort
19:00 CEST (UTC+2)	Baroan 84'	Report	Jaques 42' (pen.)	Stadium: Stade René Gaillard; Referee: Bartolomeu Varela

12 September 2020 3	Niort	1–0	Nancy	Niort
19:00 CEST (UTC+2)	Bâ 55'	Report		Stadium: Stade René Gaillard; Referee: Alexandre Perreau Niel

19 September 2020 4	Le Havre	0–1	Niort	Le Havre
19:00 CEST (UTC+2)		Report	Kemen 90'	Stadium: Stade Océane; Attendance: 4,377; Referee: Remi Landry

26 September 2020 5	Niort	2–2	Paris FC	Niort
19:00 CEST (UTC+2)	Kemen 36', 54'	Report	Martin 58' (pen.); Kanté 88'	Stadium: Stade René Gaillard; Attendance: 2,419; Referee: Benjamin Lepaysant

3 October 2020 6	Châteauroux	2–0	Niort	Châteauroux
19:00 CEST (UTC+2)	Tormin 37'; Grange (yellow card) 49'; Sanganté (yellow card) 77'; Mulumba 87'; Cissé (yellow card) 90+2'	Report	Louiserre (yellow card) 86'	Stadium: Stade Gaston Petit; Referee: Mehdi Mokhtari

17 October 2020 7	Niort	3–0	Caen	Niort
19:00 CEST (UTC+2)	Bâ 16'; Moutachy (yellow card) 56'; Bourhane 68'; Bena (yellow card) 68'; Jacob 80'	Report		Stadium: Stade René Gaillard; Referee: Romain Delpech

24 October 2020 8	Pau	4–1	Niort	Pau
19:00 CEST (UTC+2)	Lobry (yellow card) 36'; Assifuah 38'; Sabaly 45', 80'; Batisse (yellow card) 59'; Beusnard (yellow card) 75'; Armand 90+1'; Scaramozzino (penalty missed) 90+6	Report	Doukansy 13'; Paro (red card) 20'; Michel (yellow card) 90+5'	Stadium: Stade du Hameau; Referee: Aurélien Petit

31 October 2020 9	Niort	P–P	Grenoble	Niort
19:00 CET (UTC+1)				Stadium: Stade René Gaillard
Note: Match postponed due to multiple covid positives among the Grenoble squad.

7 November 2020 10	Sochaux	3–4	Niort	Montbéliard
19:00 CET (UTC+1)	Lasme 32' (pen.); Diedhiou (yellow card) 62'; Weissbeck 79', 84'	Report	Boutobba 9'; Louiserre 29', 68'; Vallier (yellow card) 45+1'; Bâ 66'; Mendes (yellow card) 89'	Stadium: Stade Auguste Bonal; Referee: Romain Lissorgue

21 November 2020 11	Niort	1–2	Dunkerque	Niort
19:00 CET (UTC+1)	Bâ 45+6', (yellow card) 88'; Boutobba (yellow card) 72'	Report	Diarra 1'; Kebbal 14'; Kerrouche (yellow card) 73'	Stadium: Stade René Gaillard; Referee: Bastien Dechepy

28 November 2020 12	Toulouse	2–1	Niort	Toulouse
15:00 CET (UTC+1)	van den Boomen 9'; Bayo (yellow card) 78'; Healey 79'	Report	Bâ 7'; Kemen (yellow card) 90+4'	Stadium: Stadium de Toulouse; Referee: Gaël Angoula

1 December 2020 13	Niort	1–0	Clermont	Niort
19:00 CET (UTC+1)	Vallier (yellow card) 15'; Bâ 22'; Moutachy (yellow card) 73'; Kemen (penalty missed) 78'	Report	Tell (red card) 42'; Gastien (yellow card) 62'; Desmas (yellow card) 78'	Stadium: Stade René Gaillard; Referee: Nicolas Rainville

5 December 2020 14	Auxerre	6–0	Niort	Auxerre
19:00 CEST (UTC+2)	Le Bihan 4', 50', 81'; Arcus (yellow card) 27'; Autret 34'; Hein 65'; Sakhi 76'	Report	Moutachy (yellow card) 38'	Stadium: Stade de l'Abbé-Deschamps; Referee: Romain Lissorgue

12 December 2020 15	Niort	2–0	Ajaccio	Niort
19:00 CET (UTC+1)	Bâ 50'; Sainati 77' (o.g.)	Report		Stadium: Stade René Gaillard; Referee: Pierre Gaillouste

15 December 2020 9	Niort	0–0	Grenoble	Niort
20:00 CEST (UTC+2)	Kilama (red card) 11'; Louiserre (yellow card) 87'	Report		Stadium: Stade René Gaillard; Referee: Mehdi Mokhtari

18 December 2020 16	Troyes	1–0	Niort	Troyes
20:00 CET (UTC+1)	Suk Hyun-jun 52', (yellow card) 67'	Report	Mendes (yellow card) 35'; Conté (yellow card) 45'; Benhattab (yellow card) 89'	Stadium: Stade de l'Aube; Referee: Aurélien Petit

22 December 2020 17	Niort	0–3	Valenciennes	Niort
20:00 CET (UTC+1)		Report		Stadium: Stade René Gaillard; Referee: Remi Landry
Note: Match awarded as a forfeit to Valenciennes due to numerous covid positives in the Niort organization.

5 January 2021 18	Rodez	1–1	Niort	Rodez
20:00 CET (UTC+1)	Ouhafsa (penalty missed) 15'; Célestine (yellow card) 69'; Henry (yellow card) 75'; David 87' (pen.)	Report	Sanaia 47' (o.g.); Yongwa (yellow card) 74' (yellow-red card) 86'; Djigla (yellow card) 83'	Stadium: Stade Paul-Lignon; Referee: Olivier Thual

8 January 2021 19	Niort	0–2	Amiens	Niort
20:00 CET (UTC+1)	Paro (yellow card) 71'	Report	Opoku (yellow card) 18'; Assogba (yellow card) 45+2'; Lusamba (yellow card) 38'; Akolo 24', 40'; Traoré (yellow card) 90+1'	Stadium: Stade René Gaillard; Referee: Arnaud Baert

23 January 2021 21	Nancy	2–2	Niort	Tomblaine
19:00 CEST (UTC+2)	Conté 28' (o.g.); Biron 82'; Scheidler (yellow card) 90+2'	Report	Doukansy (yellow card) 6' (yellow-red card) 45+1'; Bâ 12', 62'; Kemen (yellow card) 46'; Bourhane (yellow card) 84'; Yongwa (yellow card) 88'	Stadium: Stade Marcel Picot; Referee: Gaël Angoula

27 January 2021 20	Chambly	1–1	Niort	Beauvais
19:00 CET (UTC+1)	Correa (yellow card) 41'; Derrien 89'	Report	Conté (yellow card) 15'; Passi 29'; Yongwa (yellow card) 67'; Bourhane (red card) 88'	Stadium: Stade Pierre Brisson; Referee: Sylvain Palhies
Note: The match originally scheduled for 16 January 2021, was postponed due to heavy snowfall.

30 January 2021 22	Niort	0–0	Le Havre	Niort
20:00 CET (UTC+1)	Passi (yellow card) 26'; Kemen (yellow card) 38'	Report	W. Coulibaly (yellow card) 23'; Gorgelin (red card) 35'	Stadium: Stade René Gaillard; Referee: Benjamin Lepaysant

2 February 2021 23	Paris FC	3–3	Niort	Paris
20:00 CET (UTC+1)	Abdi 1', 33'; Martin 9', (yellow card) 54'; Gakpa (yellow card) 45+3'; Laura (penalty missed) 88'	Report	Jacob 20', (yellow card) 50'; Doukansy (yellow card) 34'; Boutobba 38'; Kilama (yellow card) 42' (yellow-red card) 80'; Bâ 55'	Stadium: Stade Sébastien Charléty; Referee: Mehdi Mokhtari

5 February 2021 24	Niort	1–1	Châteauroux	Niort
20:00 CET (UTC+1)	Conté (yellow card) 59'; Boutobba 68'	Report	Ibara 14', (yellow card) 25'; Keny (yellow card) 49'; Mulumba (yellow card) 56'	Stadium: Stade René Gaillard; Referee: Guillaume Paradis

13 February 2021 25	Caen	1–0	Niort	Caen
19:00 (CET) (UTC+1)	Vandermersch (yellow card) 50'; Court (yellow card) 58'; Weber 74'	Report	Yongwa (yellow card) 46'; Lebeau (yellow card) 81'	Stadium: Stade Michel d'Ornano; Referee: Remi Landry

20 February 2021 26	Niort	2–1	Pau	Niort
19:00 CET (UTC+1)	Louiserre (yellow card) 32'; Bâ 40'; Kemen 45'; Vallier (yellow card) 78'	Report	Scaramozzino (yellow card) 17'; George 59'	Stadium: Stade René Gaillard; Referee: Alexandre Perreau Niel

27 February 2021 27	Grenoble	1–1	Niort	Grenoble
19:00 CET (UTC+1)	Monfray (yellow card) 19'; Mombris (yellow card) 44'; Djitté 84'; Abdallah (yellow card) 90+2'	Report	Bâ 20' (pen.); Doukansy (yellow card) 32'	Stadium: Stade des Alpes; Referee: Gaël Angoula

2 March 2021 28	Niort	1–3	Sochaux	Niort
20:00 CET (UTC+1)	Mendes 31'; Yongwa (red card) 57'; Jacob (yellow card) 74'; Michel (yellow card) 83'	Report	Ambri 12', (yellow card) 54'; Niane 29'; Weissbeck (yellow card) 73', (goal) 84' (pen.)	Stadium: Stade René Gaillard; Referee: Pierre Gaillouste

13 March 2021 29	Dunkerque	2–0	Niort	Dunkerque
20:00 CET (UTC+1)	Kerrouche (yellow card) 24'; Tchokounté 58'; Ketkeophomphone (yellow card) 61'; Pierre 85'	Report	Doukansy (yellow card) 43'; Vallier (yellow card) 73'; Conté (red card) 78'	Stadium: Stade Marcel-Tribut; Referee: Olivier Thual

20 March 2021 30	Niort	1–0	Toulouse	Niort
20:00 CET (UTC+1)	Kilama (yellow card) 14'; Moutachy (yellow card) 63'; Kemen (yellow card) 73'; Ba 87'	Report	Moreira (red card) 90+6'	Stadium: Stade René Gaillard; Referee: Mehdi Mokhtari

3 April 2021 31	Clermont	0–0	Niort	Clermont-Ferrand
20:00 CEST (UTC+2)	Zedadka (yellow card) 35'	Report	Louiserre (yellow card) 23'; Bourhane (yellow card) 41'; Ba (penalty missed) 52', (yellow card) 90+2'; Kemen (yellow card) 76'	Stadium: Stade Gabriel Montpied; Referee: Arnaud Baert

10 April 2021 32	Niort	0–4	Auxerre	Niort
20:00 CET (UTC+1)	Louiserre (penalty missed) 50'	Report	Lloris 35', 59'; Hein 69'; Coeff 76'	Stadium: Stade René Gaillard; Referee: Nicolas Rainville

17 April 2021 33	Ajaccio	3–0	Niort	Ajaccio
20:00 CEST (UTC+2)	Courtet 22', 28'; Marchetti (yellow card) 33'; Laçi 82'	Report	Doukansy (yellow card) 9'	Stadium: Stade François Coty; Referee: Rémi Landry

20 April 2021 34	Niort	0–3	Troyes	Niort
20:00 CET (UTC+1)	Vallier (yellow card) 9'; Kilama (yellow card) 47'; Jacob (yellow card) 81'; Mendes (yellow card) 84'	Report	Tardieu 10' (pen.), 78' (pen.); Suk 75'; Rui Pires (yellow card) 87'	Stadium: Stade René Gaillard; Referee: Alexandre Perreau Niel

24 April 2021 35	Valenciennes	1–1	Niort	Valenciennes
20:00 CEST (UTC+2)	Vandenabeele (red card) 40'; Ntim 64'; Guillaume (yellow card) 79'; Kankava (yellow card) 90'	Report	Ba (penalty missed) 42'; Matufueni (yellow card) 68'; Jacob 71'	Stadium: Stade du Hainaut; Referee: Abdelatif Kherradji

1 May 2021 36	Niort	1–1	Rodez	Niort
20:00 CET (UTC+1)	Matufueni 39'	Report	Bardy 9'; Dembélé (penalty missed) 37'	Stadium: Stade René Gaillard; Referee: Gaël Angoula

8 May 2021 37	Amiens	0–0	Niort	Amiens
20:00 CET (UTC+1)	Lusamba (red card) 14'; Lomotey (yellow card) 48'; Odey (yellow card) 90+3'	Report	Matufueni (yellow card) 46'	Stadium: Stade de la Licorne; Referee: Jeremy Stinat

15 May 2021 38	Niort	0–2	Guingamp	Niort
20:00 CET (UTC+1)	Jacob (yellow card) 55'; Louiserre (yellow card) 81', (red card) 81'; Ameka (yellow card) 81'	Report	Y. Gomis 39' (pen.); Muyumba (yellow card) 87', (goal) 90+2'	Stadium: Stade René Gaillard; Referee: Olivier Thual

==== Relegation play-offs ====
19 May 2021 First leg	Villefranche	3–1	Niort	Villefranche-sur-Saône
19:00 CEST (UTC+2)	Blanc 54'; Dauchy 84'; Garita 90+3'	Report	Bâ 45+2'	Stadium: Stade Armand Chouffet; Attendance: 0 Referee: Bartolomeu Varela Teles

22 May 2021 Second leg	Niort	2–0 (3–3 (a) agg.)	Villefranche	Niort
20:45 CEST (UTC+2)	Lebeau 78'; Kemen 81'	Report		Stadium: Stade René Gaillard; Attendance: 0 Referee: Nicolas Rainville

=== Coupe de France ===
20 January 2021 Eighth round	Toulouse	1–0	Niort	Toulouse
18:00 CET (UTC+1)	Bayo 37'	Report		Stadium: Stadium de Toulouse; Referee: Nicolas Rainville
