= List of French football transfers summer 2021 =

This is a list of French football transfers for the 2021–22 summer transfer window. Only transfers featuring Ligue 1 and Ligue 2 are listed.

== Ligue 1 ==
Note: Flags indicate national team as has been defined under FIFA eligibility rules. Players may hold more than one non-FIFA nationality.

=== Lille ===
In:

No.	Pos.	Nation	Player
1	GK	CRO	Ivo Grbić (on loan from (Spain) Atlético Madrid)
5	DF	SWE	Gabriel Gudmundsson (from (Netherlands) Groningen)
24	MF	BEL	Amadou Onana (from (Germany) Hamburger SV)

Out:

No.	Pos.	Nation	Player
11	FW	BRA	Luiz Araújo (to (United States) Atlanta United)
16	GK	FRA	Mike Maignan (to (Italy) Milan)
24	MF	FRA	Boubakary Soumaré (to (England) Leicester City)
30	GK	FRA	Lucas Chevalier (on loan to Valenciennes)
—	GK	BFA	Hervé Koffi (to (Belgium) Charleroi, previously on loan at (Belgium) Mouscron)
—	DF	FRA	Adama Soumaoro (to (Italy) Bologna, previously on loan)
—	DF	FRA	Scotty Sadzoute (to (Belgium) OH Leuven, previously on loan at Pau)
—	MF	MLI	Rominigue Kouamé (to Troyes, previously on loan)
—	MF	CMR	Jean Onana (to Bordeaux, previously on loan at (Belgium) Mouscron)

=== Paris Saint-Germain ===
In:

No.	Pos.	Nation	Player
2	DF	MAR	Achraf Hakimi (from (Italy) Inter)
4	DF	ESP	Sergio Ramos (from (Spain) Real Madrid)
15	MF	POR	Danilo Pereira (from (Portugal) Porto, previously on loan)
18	MF	NED	Georginio Wijnaldum (from (England) Liverpool)
25	DF	POR	Nuno Mendes (on loan from (Portugal) Sporting CP)
30	FW	ARG	Lionel Messi (from (Spain) Barcelona)
50	GK	ITA	Gianluigi Donnarumma (from (Italy) Milan)

Out:

No.	Pos.	Nation	Player
18	FW	ITA	Moise Kean (loan return to (England) Everton)
19	MF	ESP	Pablo Sarabia (on loan to (Portugal) Sporting CP)
24	DF	ITA	Alessandro Florenzi (loan return to (Italy) Roma)
25	DF	NED	Mitchel Bakker (to (Germany) Bayer Leverkusen)
32	DF	FRA	Timothée Pembélé (on loan to Bordeaux)
36	MF	FRA	Kays Ruiz-Atil (to (Spain) Barcelona B)
39	FW	FRA	Kenny Nagera (on loan to Bastia)
—	DF	FRA	Thierno Baldé (on loan to Le Havre)
—	GK	FRA	Garissone Innocent (on loan to Vannes, previously on loan at Caen)
—	GK	FRA	Alphonse Areola (on loan to (England) West Ham United, previously on loan at (England) Fulham)
—	GK	POL	Marcin Bułka (on loan to Nice, previously on loan at Châteauroux)

=== Monaco ===
In:

No.	Pos.	Nation	Player
9	FW	NED	Myron Boadu (from (Netherlands) AZ)
11	MF	BRA	Jean Lucas (from Lyon, previously on loan at Brest)
14	DF	GER	Ismail Jakobs (from (Germany) 1. FC Köln)
16	GK	GER	Alexander Nübel (on loan from (Germany) Bayern Munich)

Out:

No.	Pos.	Nation	Player
2	DF	SEN	Fodé Ballo-Touré (to (Italy) Milan)
10	FW	MNE	Stevan Jovetić (to (Germany) Hertha BSC)
19	FW	ITA	Pietro Pellegri (on loan to (Italy) Milan)
35	MF	POR	Florentino (loan return to (Portugal) Benfica)
38	MF	FRA	Enzo Millot (to (Germany) VfB Stuttgart)
40	GK	FRA	Benjamin Lecomte (on loan to (Spain) Atlético Madrid)
—	MF	CIV	Jean-Eudes Aholou (reloan to Strasbourg)
—	DF	FRA	Arthur Zagré (on loan to (Netherlands) Utrecht, previously on loan at Dijon)
—	DF	ITA	Antonio Barreca (on loan to (Italy) Lecce, previously on loan at (Italy) Fiorentina)
—	DF	GER	Benjamin Henrichs (to (Germany) RB Leipzig, previously on loan)
—	DF	BRA	Jorge (to (Brazil) Palmeiras, previously on loan at (Switzerland) Basel)
—	DF	FRA	Giulian Biancone (to Troyes, previously on loan at (Belgium) Cercle Brugge)
—	MF	POR	Gil Dias (to (Portugal) Benfica, previously on loan at (Portugal) Famalicão)
—	MF	NGA	Henry Onyekuru (to (Greece) Olympiacos, previously on loan at (Turkey) Galatasaray)

=== Lyon ===
In:

No.	Pos.	Nation	Player
3	DF	ITA	Emerson (on loan from (England) Chelsea)
12	DF	BRA	Henrique (from (Brazil) Vasco da Gama)
19	MF	SUI	Xherdan Shaqiri (from (England) Liverpool)
21	DF	FRA	Damien Da Silva (from Rennes)

Out:

No.	Pos.	Nation	Player
3	DF	ALG	Djamel Benlamri (to Qatar)
10	FW	NED	Memphis Depay (to (Spain) Barcelona)
19	DF	TUR	Cenk Özkacar (on loan to (Belgium) OH Leuven)
22	DF	ITA	Mattia De Sciglio (loan return to (Italy) Juventus)
26	DF	FRA	Melvin Bard (to Nice)
27	MF	CIV	Maxwel Cornet (to (England) Burnley)
29	FW	FRA	Yaya Soumaré (on loan to Dijon)
—	DF	MLI	Youssouf Koné (on loan to Troyes, previously on loan at (Turkey) Hatayspor)
—	DF	DEN	Joachim Andersen (to (England) Crystal Palace, previously on loan at (England) Fulham)
—	MF	BRA	Jean Lucas (to Monaco, previously on loan at Brest)

=== Marseille ===
In:

No.	Pos.	Nation	Player
2	DF	FRA	William Saliba (on loan from (England) Arsenal, previously on loan at Nice)
5	DF	ARG	Leonardo Balerdi (from (Germany) Borussia Dortmund, previously on loan)
6	MF	FRA	Matteo Guendouzi (on loan from (England) Arsenal, previously on loan at (Germany) Hertha BSC)
8	MF	BRA	Gerson (from (Brazil) Flamengo)
14	DF	BRA	Luan Peres (from (Brazil) Santos)
16	GK	ESP	Pau López (on loan from (Italy) Roma)
17	FW	TUR	Cengiz Ünder (on loan from (Italy) Roma, previously on loan at (England) Leicester City)
20	FW	USA	Konrad de la Fuente (from (Spain) Barcelona B)
29	DF	ESP	Pol Lirola (from (Italy) Fiorentina, previously on loan)
45	MF	FRA	Bilal Nadir (from Nice youth)
49	FW	FRA	Salim Ben Seghir (from Nice)
—	FW	ESP	Pedro Ruiz (from (Spain) Real Madrid Castilla)

Out:

No.	Pos.	Nation	Player
2	DF	JPN	Hiroki Sakai (to (Japan) Urawa Reds)
8	MF	FRA	Olivier Ntcham (loan return to (Scotland) Celtic)
9	FW	ARG	Darío Benedetto (on loan to (Spain) Elche)
17	MF	FRA	Michaël Cuisance (loan return to (Germany) Bayern Munich)
20	DF	FRA	Christopher Rocchia (to Dijon)
24	MF	TUN	Saîf-Eddine Khaoui (to Clermont)
26	FW	FRA	Florian Thauvin (to (Mexico) Tigres UANL)
32	DF	FRA	Lucas Perrin (on loan to Strasbourg)
—	FW	ESP	Pedro Ruiz (on loan to (Netherlands) NEC Nijmegen)
—	MF	NED	Kevin Strootman (on loan to (Italy) Cagliari, previously on loan at (Italy) Genoa)
—	MF	SRB	Nemanja Radonjić (on loan to (Portugal) Benfica, previously on loan at (Germany) Hertha BSC)
—	DF	COM	Abdallah Ali Mohamed (to (Switzerland) Stade Lausanne Ouchy, previously on loan at (Belgium) Zulte Waregem)
—	MF	FRA	Maxime Lopez (to (Italy) Sassuolo, previously on loan)

=== Rennes ===
In:

No.	Pos.	Nation	Player
8	MF	FRA	Baptiste Santamaria (from (Germany) SC Freiburg)
18	FW	GHA	Kamaldeen Sulemana (from (Denmark) Nordsjælland)
21	MF	CRO	Lovro Majer (from (Croatia) Dinamo Zagreb)
25	DF	NOR	Birger Meling (from Nîmes)
31	DF	FRA	Loïc Badé (from Lens)
—	GK	TUR	Doğan Alemdar (from (Turkey) Kayserispor)
–	FW	FRA	Gaëtan Laborde (from Montpellier)

Out:

No.	Pos.	Nation	Player
3	DF	FRA	Damien Da Silva (to Lyon)
4	DF	FRA	Gerzino Nyamsi (to Strasbourg)
5	DF	BRA	Dalbert (loan return to (Italy) Inter)
8	MF	FRA	Clément Grenier (released)
10	MF	FRA	Eduardo Camavinga (to (Spain) Real Madrid)
12	MF	CMR	James Léa Siliki (on loan to (England) Middlesbrough)
15	MF	FRA	Steven Nzonzi (loan return to (Italy) Roma)
17	DF	FRA	Faitout Maouassa (to (Belgium) Club Brugge)
19	MF	FRA	Yann Gboho (on loan to (Netherlands) Vitesse)
22	MF	FRA	Romain Del Castillo (to Brest)
—	DF	FRA	Sacha Boey (to (Turkey) Galatasaray, previously on loan at Dijon)
—	DF	FRA	Lilian Brassier (to Brest, previously on loan)
—	MF	FRA	Hakim El Mokeddem (to Sète 34, previously on loan)
–	MF	FRA	Rafik Guitane (to Reims)
—	FW	FRA	Franck Rivollier (on loan to Stade Briochin)
—	FW	USA	Jordan Siebatcheu (to (Switzerland) Young Boys, previously on loan)

=== Lens ===
In:

No.	Pos.	Nation	Player
1	GK	VEN	Wuilker Faríñez (from (Colombia) Millonarios, previously on loan)
3	DF	COL	Deiver Machado (from Toulouse)
4	DF	AUT	Kevin Danso (from (Germany) FC Augsburg, previously on loan at (Germany) Fortuna Düsseldorf)
5	DF	FRA	Christopher Wooh (from Nancy)
10	MF	COD	Gaël Kakuta (from Amiens, previously on loan)
22	FW	FRA	Wesley Saïd (from Toulouse)
29	MF	POL	Przemysław Frankowski (from (United States) Chicago Fire)
30	GK	POR	Valentino Lesieur (from Nantes youth)
36	MF	SEN	Mamadou Camara (from (Senegal) Dakar Sacré-Cœur)

Out:

No.	Pos.	Nation	Player
3	DF	GUI	Issiaga Sylla (loan return to Toulouse)
4	DF	FRA	Loïc Badé (to Rennes)
5	DF	FRA	Zakaria Diallo (to (Kuwait) Al-Shabab)
13	DF	FRA	Clément Michelin (to (Greece) AEK Athens)
20	DF	MLI	Cheick Traoré (to Dijon)
22	MF	FRA	Tony Mauricio (to Sochaux)
29	FW	FRA	Arnaud Kalimuendo (loan return to Paris Saint-Germain)
34	MF	ALG	Adam Oudjani (on loan to Stade Briochin)
—	FW	FRA	Boubakar Camara (on loan to Le Mans)
—	GK	FRA	Thomas Vincensini (to Bastia, previously on loan)

=== Montpellier ===
In:

No.	Pos.	Nation	Player
3	DF	FRA	Mamadou Sakho (from (England) Crystal Palace)
18	MF	FRA	Léo Leroy (from Châteauroux)
26	DF	BRA	Matheus Thuler (on loan from (Brazil) Flamengo)

Out:

No.	Pos.	Nation	Player
3	DF	FRA	Daniel Congré (to Dijon)
4	DF	BRA	Hilton (retired)
9	FW	ALG	Andy Delort (to Nice)
14	MF	FRA	Damien Le Tallec (to (Greece) AEK Athens)
20	MF	RSA	Keagan Dolly (to (South Africa) Kaizer Chiefs)
24	FW	KOR	Yun Il-lok (to (South Korea) Ulsan Hyundai)
26	MF	FRA	Samy Benchamma (to Chamois Niortais)
27	DF	FRA	Clément Vidal (on loan to Ajaccio)
—	MF	FRA	Kylian Kaïboué (to Bastia, previously on loan at Sète 34)
—	FW	FRA	Bastian Badu (to Le Mans, previously on loan at Chambly)
–	FW	FRA	Gaëtan Laborde (to Rennes)

=== Reims ===
In:

No.	Pos.	Nation	Player
6	DF	GLP	Andreaw Gravillon (on loan from (Italy) Inter, previously on loan at Lorient)
19	MF	NED	Mitchell van Bergen (from (Netherlands) Heerenveen)
30	GK	FRA	Nicolas Penneteau (from (Belgium) Charleroi)
—	MF	FRA	Rafik Guitane (from Rennes)

Out:

No.	Pos.	Nation	Player
8	MF	SUI	Dereck Kutesa (on loan to (Belgium) Zulte Waregem)
11	FW	SEN	Boulaye Dia (to (Spain) Villarreal)
28	DF	BEL	Thibault De Smet (on loan to (Belgium) Beerschot)
29	DF	AUT	Dario Marešić (on loan to (Austria) LASK)
30	GK	SEN	Dialy Ndiaye (on loan to Boulogne)
—	FW	FRA	Timothé Nkada (on loan to Orléans, previously on loan at (Denmark) AaB)
—	GK	FRA	Nicolas Lemaître (to Quevilly-Rouen, previously on loan)
—	DF	FRA	Logan Costa (to Toulouse, previously on loan at Le Mans)

=== Nice ===
In:

No.	Pos.	Nation	Player
1	GK	POL	Marcin Bułka (on loan from Paris Saint-Germain, previously on loan at Châteauroux)
8	MF	NED	Pablo Rosario (from (Netherlands) PSV)
18	MF	GAB	Mario Lemina (from (England) Southampton, previously on loan at (England) Fulham)
21	FW	NED	Justin Kluivert (on loan from (Italy) Roma, previously on loan at (Germany) RB Leipzig)
22	MF	NED	Calvin Stengs (from (Netherlands) AZ)
25	DF	FRA	Jean-Clair Todibo (from (Spain) Barcelona, previously on loan)
26	DF	FRA	Melvin Bard (from Lyon)
—	FW	ALG	Andy Delort (from Montpellier)
—	MF	CIV	Jean N'Guessan (from (Ivory Coast) Abidjan)

Out:

No.	Pos.	Nation	Player
2	DF	FRA	Stanley Nsoki (to (Belgium) Club Brugge)
8	MF	FRA	Pierre Lees-Melou (to (England) Norwich City)
18	DF	FRA	William Saliba (loan return to (England) Arsenal)
22	MF	POR	Rony Lopes (loan return to (Spain) Sevilla)
24	DF	FRA	Andy Pelmard (on loan to (Switzerland) Basel)
29	MF	FRA	Jeff Reine-Adélaïde (loan return to Lyon)
36	FW	FRA	Salim Ben Seghir (to Marseille)
—	MF	CIV	Jean N'Guessan (on loan to (Switzerland) Lausanne)
—	DF	CIV	Ibrahim Cissé (on loan to Le Mans, previously on loan at Châteauroux)
—	DF	SEN	Racine Coly (to (Portugal) Estoril, previously on loan at Amiens)
—	DF	CIV	Armel Zohouri (to (Switzerland) Lausanne, previously on loan)
—	MF	CIV	Trazié Thomas (to (Switzerland) Lausanne, previously on loan)
—	MF	FRA	Wylan Cyprien (to (Italy) Parma, previously on loan)
—	MF	POR	Pedro Brazão (to (Portugal) Famalicão, previously on loan at (Switzerland) Lausanne)
—	FW	FRA	Hicham Mahou (to (Switzerland) Lausanne, previously on loan)

=== Metz ===
In:

No.	Pos.	Nation	Player
4	DF	FRA	Sikou Niakaté (on loan from Guingamp)
15	MF	SEN	Pape Matar Sarr (on loan from (England) Tottenham Hotspur)
21	MF	MAR	Amine Bassi (from Nancy)
22	DF	FRA	Sofiane Alakouch (from Nîmes)
24	FW	FRA	Lenny Joseph (from Le Puy)

Out:

No.	Pos.	Nation	Player
5	MF	CIV	Victorien Angban (to (Russia) Sochi)
6	DF	MLI	Mamadou Fofana (to Amiens)
9	FW	FRA	Thierry Ambrose (to (Belgium) Oostende)
15	MF	SEN	Pape Matar Sarr (to (England) Tottenham Hotspur)
22	MF	FRA	Youssef Maziz (on loan to (Belgium) Seraing)
24	FW	BEL	Aaron Leya Iseka (loan return to Toulouse)
—	MF	BEL	Mathieu Cachbach (on loan to (Belgium) Seraing)
—	FW	SEN	Amadou Dia N'Diaye (on loan to Le Mans, previously on loan at (Belgium) Seraing)

=== Saint-Étienne ===
In:

No.	Pos.	Nation	Player

Out:

No.	Pos.	Nation	Player
4	DF	GRE	Panagiotis Retsos (loan return to (Germany) Bayer Leverkusen)
6	DF	SEN	Pape Abou Cissé (loan return to (Greece) Olympiacos)
14	FW	FRA	Anthony Modeste (loan return to (Germany) 1. FC Köln)
22	MF	FRA	Kévin Monnet-Paquet (to (Cyprus) Aris Limassol)
26	DF	FRA	Mathieu Debuchy (to Valenciennes)
30	GK	FRA	Jessy Moulin (to Troyes)

=== Bordeaux ===
In:

No.	Pos.	Nation	Player
8	MF	CMR	Jean Onana (from Lille, previously on loan at (Belgium) Mouscron)
12	DF	POR	Ricardo Mangas (on loan from (Portugal) Boavista)
13	MF	BRA	Fransérgio (from (Portugal) Braga)
14	DF	GHA	Gideon Mensah (on loan from (Austria) Red Bull Salzburg, previously on loan at (Portugal) Vitória de Guimarães)
22	DF	FRA	Timothée Pembélé (on loan from Paris Saint-Germain)
29	FW	HON	Alberth Elis (on loan from (Portugal) Boavista)
33	MF	MLI	Issouf Sissokho (from (Mali) Derby Académie, previously on loan)

Out:

No.	Pos.	Nation	Player
15	MF	CIV	Jean Michaël Seri (loan return to (England) Fulham)
20	DF	SEN	Youssouf Sabaly (to (Mali) Real Betis)
26	MF	CRO	Toma Bašić (to (Italy) Lazio)
—	GK	FRA	Over Mandanda (to Saint-Priest, previously on loan at Laval)
—	DF	FRA	Thomas Carrique (to (Spain) Celta Vigo B, previously on loan at (Spain) Calahorra)
—	DF	FRA	Alexandre Lauray (to Le Mans, previously on loan at Villefranche)
—	MF	ESP	Rubén Pardo (to (Spain) Leganés, previously on loan)

=== Angers ===
In:

No.	Pos.	Nation	Player
2	MF	FRA	Batista Mendy (from Nantes)
18	MF	MAR	Azzedine Ounahi (from Avranches)

Out:

No.	Pos.	Nation	Player
9	FW	FRA	Loïs Diony (on loan to (Serbia) Red Star Belgrade)
14	MF	MLI	Lassana Coulibaly (to (Italy) Salernitana)
16	GK	FRA	Ludovic Butelle (to Red Star)
18	MF	FRA	Ibrahim Amadou (loan return to (Spain) Sevilla)
31	FW	FRA	Yassin Fortuné (loan return to (Switzerland) Sion)
—	DF	FRA	Rayan Aït-Nouri (to (England) Wolves, previously on loan)

=== Strasbourg ===
In:

No.	Pos.	Nation	Player
4	DF	POL	Karol Fila (from (Poland) Lechia Gdańsk)
5	DF	FRA	Lucas Perrin (on loan from Marseille)
6	MF	CIV	Jean-Eudes Aholou (reloan from Monaco)
9	FW	FRA	Kevin Gameiro (from Valencia)
—	DF	FRA	Frédéric Guilbert (on loan from (England) Aston Villa, loan extension)
—	DF	FRA	Maxime Le Marchand (from (England) Fulham, previously on loan at (Belgium) Antwerp)
—	DF	FRA	Gerzino Nyamsi (from Rennes)

Out:

No.	Pos.	Nation	Player
2	DF	FRA	Mohamed Simakan (to (Germany) RB Leipzig)
9	FW	ALG	Idriss Saadi (to Bastia)
13	DF	SRB	Stefan Mitrović (to (Spain) Getafe)
20	FW	MLI	Kévin Zohi (to (Portugal) Vizela)
23	DF	FRA	Lionel Carole (to (Turkey) Kayserispor)
29	DF	FRA	Ismaël Aaneba (to Sochaux)
34	MF	FRA	Adrien Lebeau (to (Germany) Waldhof Mannheim)
—	DF	CMR	Duplexe Tchamba (to (Denmark) SønderjyskE, previously on loan at (Norway) Strømsgodset)
—	MF	TUN	Moataz Zemzemi (to Chamois Niortais, previously on loan at Avranches)

=== Lorient ===
In:

No.	Pos.	Nation	Player
2	DF	BRA	Igor Silva (from (Croatia) Osijek)

Out:

No.	Pos.	Nation	Player
2	DF	GLP	Andreaw Gravillon (loan return to (Italy) Inter)
4	DF	POR	Tiago Ilori (loan return to (Portugal) Sporting CP)
8	MF	ENG	Trevoh Chalobah (loan return to (England) Chelsea)
12	MF	FRA	Sylvain Marveaux (to (United States) Charlotte Independence)
19	FW	COD	Yoane Wissa (to (England) Brentford)
24	MF	CMR	Franklin Wadja (to Caen)
—	MF	FRA	Julien Ponceau (on loan to Nîmes, previously on loan at Rodez)
—	FW	TUR	Umut Bozok (on loan to (Turkey) Kasımpaşa, previously on loan at Troyes)
—	GK	FRA	Maxime Pattier (to Stade Briochin, previously on loan)

=== Brest ===
In:

No.	Pos.	Nation	Player
3	DF	FRA	Lilian Brassier (from Rennes, previously on loan)
20	DF	FIN	Jere Uronen (from (Belgium) Genk)
30	GK	FRA	Grégoire Coudert (from Amiens)
40	GK	NED	Marco Bizot (from (Netherlands) AZ)
—	MF	FRA	Romain Del Castillo (from Rennes)

Out:

No.	Pos.	Nation	Player
4	DF	FRA	Idrissa Dioh (to (Portugal) Vilafranquense)
6	MF	BRA	Jean Lucas (loan return to Lyon)
10	FW	FRA	Gaëtan Charbonnier (to Auxerre)
18	DF	FRA	Romain Perraud (to (England) Southampton)
19	MF	FRA	Ferris N'Goma (to Châteauroux)
29	MF	FRA	Bandiougou Fadiga (loan return to Paris Saint-Germain)
—	FW	POR	Heriberto Tavares (to (Portugal) Famalicão, previously on loan)

=== Nantes ===
In:

No.	Pos.	Nation	Player
1	GK	FRA	Alban Lafont (from (Italy) Fiorentina, previously on loan)
8	MF	FRA	Wylan Cyprien (on loan from (Italy) Parma)
16	GK	FRA	Rémy Descamps (from (Belgium) Charleroi)
26	FW	GHA	Osman Bukari (on loan from (Belgium) Gent)

Out:

No.	Pos.	Nation	Player
15	DF	FRA	Thomas Basila (to (Belgium) Oostende)
26	MF	FRA	Imran Louza (to (England) Watford)
29	MF	FRA	Batista Mendy (to Angers)
—	GK	FRA	Alexandre Olliero (to Pau, previously on loan)
—	MF	BRA	Lucas Evangelista (to (Brazil) Red Bull Bragantino, previously on loan)
—	FW	FRA	Élie Youan (to (Switzerland) St. Gallen, previously on loan)

=== Troyes ===
In:

No.	Pos.	Nation	Player
3	DF	MLI	Youssouf Koné (on loan from Lyon, previously on loan at (Turkey) Hatayspor)
4	DF	FRA	Giulian Biancone (from Monaco, previously on loan at (Belgium) Cercle Brugge)
6	MF	MLI	Rominigue Kouamé (from Lille, previously on loan)
11	MF	BRA	Metinho (from (Brazil) Fluminense)
20	MF	FRA	Renaud Ripart (from Nîmes)
21	FW	UKR	Mykola Kukharevych (from (Ukraine) Rukh Lviv)
22	DF	ALG	Yasser Larouci (from (England) Liverpool)
25	FW	GNB	Mama Baldé (from Dijon)
28	FW	MAR	Nassim Chadli (from Nîmes B)
29	DF	BFA	Issa Kaboré (on loan from (England) Manchester City, previously on loan at (Belgium) Mechelen)
40	GK	FRA	Jessy Moulin (from Saint-Étienne)
—	DF	FRA	Adil Rami (from (Portugal) Boavista)
—	DF	NED	Philippe Sandler (on loan from (England) Manchester City)
—	MF	ENG	Patrick Roberts (on loan from (England) Manchester City, previously on loan at (England) Derby County)

Out:

No.	Pos.	Nation	Player
3	MF	FRA	Kemelho Nguena (to (Bulgaria) Slavia Sofia)
11	FW	FRA	Lenny Pintor (loan return to Lyon)
15	MF	MAD	Rayan Raveloson (to (United States) LA Galaxy)
20	MF	POR	Rui Pires (on loan to (Portugal) Paços de Ferreira)
23	MF	COD	Stone Mambo (to Orléans)
24	FW	FRA	Alimami Gory (loan return to (Belgium) Cercle Brugge)
25	DF	FRA	Terence Baya (to (Denmark) Vendsyssel)
26	FW	CGO	Dylan Saint-Louis (to (Turkey) Hatayspor)
28	MF	FRA	Maxime Barthelmé (to Guingamp)
31	MF	BUL	Filip Krastev (loan return to (Belgium) Lommel)
39	FW	TUR	Umut Bozok (loan return to Lorient)
—	DF	FRA	Mahamadou Dembélé (reloan to Pau)

=== Clermont ===
In:

No.	Pos.	Nation	Player
5	DF	CMR	Jean-Claude Billong (from (Italy) Benevento, previously on loan at (Turkey) Hatayspor)
6	MF	TUN	Saîf-Eddine Khaoui (from Marseille)
15	DF	SEN	Arial Mendy (from (Switzerland) Servette)
18	FW	KOS	Elbasan Rashani (from (Turkey) BB Erzurumspor)
19	MF	GHA	Salis Abdul Samed (from (Ivory Coast) JMG Academy, previously on loan)
—	MF	ESP	Oriol Busquets (from (Spain) Barcelona B)
—	MF	TUR	Cem Türkmen (from (Germany) Bayer Leverkusen)

Out:

No.	Pos.	Nation	Player
8	MF	FRA	Lorenzo Rajot (to Rodez)
18	MF	FRA	Sofyan Chader (on loan to (Switzerland) Stade Lausanne Ouchy)
22	DF	FRA	Driss Trichard (to Dunkerque)
28	FW	GNB	David Gomis (to Pau)
32	DF	BIH	Muamer Aljic (to Louhans-Cuiseaux)
34	DF	FRA	Baïla Diallo (on loan to Orléans)
—	MF	TUR	Cem Türkmen (on loan to Austria Lustenau)
—	DF	FRA	Till Cissokho (on loan to Quevilly-Rouen, previously on loan at Austria Lustenau)
—	MF	GHA	Blankson Anoff (on loan to (Luxembourg) Swift Hesperange, previously on loan at Austria Lustenau)
—	MF	AUT	Muhammed Cham (on loan to Austria Lustenau, previously on loan at (Denmark) Vendsyssel)

== Ligue 2 ==
Note: Flags indicate national team as has been defined under FIFA eligibility rules. Players may hold more than one non-FIFA nationality.

=== Nîmes ===
In:

No.	Pos.	Nation	Player
1	GK	NOR	Per Kristian Bråtveit (on loan from (Sweden) Djurgården, previously on loan at (Netherlands) Groningen)
9	FW	ISL	Elías Már Ómarsson (from (Netherlands) Excelsior)
19	MF	FRA	Julien Ponceau (on loan from Lorient, previously on loan at Rodez)
27	DF	JPN	Naomichi Ueda (from (Belgium) Cercle Brugge, previously on loan)

Out:

No.	Pos.	Nation	Player
3	DF	NOR	Birger Meling (to Rennes)
8	MF	FRA	Lucas Deaux (to Dijon)
9	FW	FRA	Clément Depres (to Rodez)
11	MF	BEN	Mattéo Ahlinvi (to Dijon)
19	MF	FRA	Lucas Buadés (to Rodez)
20	MF	FRA	Renaud Ripart (to Troyes)
24	FW	MAR	Sami Ben Amar (to (Republic of Ireland) Dundalk)
25	FW	FRA	Nolan Roux (to Châteauroux)
26	DF	FRA	Florian Miguel (to (Spain) Huesca)
29	DF	FRA	Sofiane Alakouch (to Metz)
30	GK	FRA	Baptiste Reynet (to Dijon)
—	FW	MKD	Vlatko Stojanovski (to (Croatia) Gorica, previously on loan at Chambly)

=== Dijon ===
In:

No.	Pos.	Nation	Player
3	DF	FRA	Daniel Congré (from Montpellier)
6	MF	BEN	Mattéo Ahlinvi (from Nîmes)
8	FW	FRA	Mickaël Le Bihan (from Auxerre)
11	MF	FRA	Valentin Jacob (from Chamois Niortais)
12	MF	FRA	Lucas Deaux (from Nîmes)
17	FW	FRA	Yaya Soumaré (on loan from Lyon)
20	DF	FRA	Christopher Rocchia (from Marseille)
23	DF	SEN	Zargo Touré (from (Turkey) Gençlerbirliği)
26	MF	FRA	Jessy Pi (from Caen)
27	DF	MLI	Cheick Traoré (from Lens)
30	GK	FRA	Baptiste Reynet (from Nîmes)

Out:

No.	Pos.	Nation	Player
2	DF	FRA	Sacha Boey (loan return to Rennes)
3	DF	COD	Ngonda Muzinga (to (Latvia) Riga)
6	MF	SEN	Pape Cheikh Diop (loan return to Lyon)
8	MF	FRA	Junior Dina Ebimbe (loan return to Paris Saint-Germain)
12	DF	FRA	Arthur Zagré (loan return to Monaco)
13	DF	ECU	Aníbal Chalá (loan return to (Mexico) Toluca)
15	FW	CIV	Roger Assalé (on loan to (Germany) Werder Bremen)
16	GK	BEN	Saturnin Allagbé (on loan to Valenciennes)
17	FW	GNB	Mama Baldé (to Troyes)
22	MF	GAB	Didier Ndong (on loan to (Turkey) Yeni Malatyaspor)
27	FW	MTN	Aboubakar Kamara (loan return to (England) Fulham)

=== Toulouse ===
In:

No.	Pos.	Nation	Player
2	DF	DEN	Rasmus Nicolaisen (from (Denmark) Midtjylland, previously on loan at (England) Portsmouth)
3	DF	DEN	Mikkel Desler (from (Norway) Haugesund)
5	MF	AUS	Denis Genreau (from (Australia) Macarthur)
7	FW	JPN	Ado Onaiwu (from (Japan) Yokohama F. Marinos)
11	FW	FRA	Yanis Begraoui (from Auxerre)
14	DF	FRA	Logan Costa (from Reims, previously on loan at Le Mans)
31	MF	BEL	Brecht Dejaegere (from (Belgium) Gent, previously on loan)

Out:

No.	Pos.	Nation	Player
2	DF	FRA	Kelvin Amian (to (Italy) Spezia)
3	DF	COL	Deiver Machado (to Lens)
7	FW	FRA	Wesley Saïd (to Lens)
8	MF	FRA	Kouadio Koné (loan return to (Germany) Borussia Mönchengladbach)
12	DF	BEL	Sébastien Dewaest (loan return to (Belgium) Genk)
15	FW	CIV	Vakoun Issouf Bayo (loan return to (Scotland) Celtic)
20	FW	GRE	Efthymis Koulouris (to (Greece) Atromitos)
21	FW	FRA	Amine Adli (to (Germany) Bayer Leverkusen)
28	FW	FRA	Janis Antiste (to (Italy) Spezia)
—	MF	FRA	Kalidou Sidibé (on loan to Quevilly-Rouen, previously on loan at Châteauroux)
—	DF	FRA	Mathieu Gonçalves (to (Switzerland) Xamax, previously on loan at Le Mans)
—	FW	COD	Aaron Leya Iseka (to (England) Barnsley, previously on loan at Metz)

=== Grenoble ===
In:

No.	Pos.	Nation	Player
7	MF	GEO	Giorgi Kokhreidze (from (Georgia (country)) Saburtalo)
18	MF	ARG	Manuel de Iriondo (from (Romania) Politehnica Iași)
24	MF	SUI	Yannick Marchand (on loan from (Switzerland) Basel)
25	MF	SUI	Orges Bunjaku (from (Switzerland) Basel)
26	FW	FRA	Joris Correa (from Chambly)
27	FW	SEN	Olivier Boissy (from (Burkina Faso) Salitas)
—	MF	FRA	Franck-Yves Bambock (from (Portugal) Marítimo)

Out:

No.	Pos.	Nation	Player
2	FW	SEN	Moussa Djitté (to (United States) Austin)
6	MF	FRA	Charles Pickel (to (Portugal) Famalicão)
7	MF	CPV	Willy Semedo (to (Cyprus) Pafos)
23	DF	MAD	Jérôme Mombris (to Guingamp)
26	MF	FRA	Kevin Tapoko (loan return to (Israel) Hapoel Be'er Sheva)
—	MF	GUY	Terell Ondaan (to (Romania) Universitatea Craiova, previously on loan at (Netherlands) NEC)
—	FW	ISL	Kristófer Kristinsson (to (Denmark) SønderjyskE, previously on loan at (Netherlands) Jong PSV)

=== Paris ===
In:

No.	Pos.	Nation	Player
2	DF	FRA	Maxime Bernauer (from Le Mans)
24	MF	FRA	Yohan Demoncy (from Orléans)
25	FW	FRA	Migouel Alfarela (from Annecy)
40	GK	CRO	Ivan Filipović (from (Croatia) Slaven Belupo)

Out:

No.	Pos.	Nation	Player
2	DF	TUN	Ali Abdi (to Caen)
24	FW	USA	Patrick Koffi (on loan to Créteil)
25	MF	FRA	Andy Pembélé (on loan to Créteil)
32	MF	FRA	Charles Boli (loan return to Lens)
—	FW	FRA	Richard Sila (to (Romania) Botoșani, previously on loan at Concarneau)

=== Auxerre ===
In:

No.	Pos.	Nation	Player
5	DF	FRA	Théo Pellenard (from Valenciennes)
10	MF	FRA	Gaëtan Perrin (from Orléans)
19	FW	FRA	Gaëtan Charbonnier (from Brest)

Out:

No.	Pos.	Nation	Player
8	FW	FRA	Mickaël Le Bihan (to Dijon)
10	FW	CHN	Ji Xiaoxuan (on loan to (China) Qingdao)
13	FW	MTQ	Kévin Fortuné (to Châteauroux)
14	DF	FRA	Kenji-Van Boto (on loan to Pau)
19	FW	FRA	Yanis Begraoui (to Toulouse)
26	DF	FRA	Samuel Souprayen (to (Bulgaria) Botev Plovdiv)

=== Sochaux ===
In:

No.	Pos.	Nation	Player
7	MF	FRA	Tony Mauricio (from Lens)
11	FW	FRA	Maxime Do Couto (from (Ukraine) Olimpik Donetsk)
15	FW	FRA	Aldo Kalulu (from (Switzerland) Basel)
22	DF	FRA	Ismaël Aaneba (from Strasbourg)
29	DF	FRA	Valentin Henry (from Rodez)

Out:

No.	Pos.	Nation	Player
7	MF	FRA	Bryan Soumaré (loan return to Dijon)
8	MF	ALG	Sofiane Daham (to Châteauroux)
13	FW	FRA	Walid Jarmouni (on loan to Sète 34)
14	FW	CIV	Chris Bedia (loan return to (Belgium) Charleroi)
15	FW	FRA	Bryan Lasme (to (Germany) Arminia Bielefeld)
19	DF	FRA	Romain Sans (to Châteauroux)
23	DF	FRA	Boris Moltenis (to Boulogne)
29	MF	FRA	Natanael Ntolla (to Châteauroux)
—	MF	FRA	Isaak Umbdenstock (to Chambly, previously on loan at Bastia-Borgo)

=== Nancy ===
In:

No.	Pos.	Nation	Player
2	DF	GNB	Soares (from (Cape Verde) Batuque)
4	DF	FRA	Thomas Basila (on loan from (Belgium) Oostende)
7	FW	MTQ	Mickaël Biron (on loan from (Belgium) Oostende)
9	FW	FRA	Andrew Jung (on loan from (Belgium) Oostende)
10	FW	SEN	Mamadou Thiam (on loan from (Belgium) Oostende)
15	MF	CPV	Kelvin Patrick (from (Cape Verde) Batuque)
16	GK	ENG	Nathan Trott (on loan from (England) West Ham United)
17	FW	ANG	Elliot Simões (from (England) Barnsley, previously on loan at (England) Doncaster Rovers)
19	DF	FRA	William Bianda (on loan from (Italy) Roma, previously on loan at (Belgium) Zulte Waregem)
22	DF	FRA	Shaquil Delos (from Chambly)

Out:

No.	Pos.	Nation	Player
2	DF	FRA	Mathias Fischer (to Bourg-en-Bresse)
7	FW	MTQ	Mickaël Biron (to (Belgium) Oostende)
10	MF	MAR	Amine Bassi (to Metz)
14	MF	FRA	Mehdi Merghem (loan return to Guingamp)
15	MF	CPV	Kenny Rocha (to (Belgium) Oostende)
16	GK	FRA	Martin Sourzac (to Chambly)
25	FW	FRA	Mons Bassouamina (to Bastia-Borgo)
26	FW	FRA	Aurélien Scheidler (loan return to Dijon)
29	FW	FRA	Rayan Philippe (loan return to Dijon)
33	DF	FRA	Christopher Wooh (to Lens)

=== Guingamp ===
In:

No.	Pos.	Nation	Player
18	MF	MLI	Souleymane Diarra (from Pau)
19	DF	COD	Maxime Sivis (from Red Star)
23	DF	MAD	Jérôme Mombris (from Grenoble)
24	DF	FRA	Pierre Lemonnier (from Le Mans)
28	MF	FRA	Maxime Barthelmé (from Troyes)

Out:

No.	Pos.	Nation	Player
1	GK	DEN	Nicolai Larsen (to (Denmark) Silkeborg)
3	DF	FRA	Morgan Poaty (to (Belgium) Seraing)
5	DF	GAB	Lloyd Palun (to Bastia)
6	MF	RSA	Lebogang Phiri (to (Turkey) Çaykur Rizespor)
15	DF	FRA	Jérémy Sorbon (retired)
19	MF	FRA	Guessouma Fofana (to (Romania) CFR Cluj)
22	MF	FRA	Bryan Pelé (to (Cyprus) AEL Limassol)
23	FW	FRA	Ronny Rodelin (to (Switzerland) Servette)
26	MF	TOG	Alaixys Romao (to (Greece) Ionikos)
27	DF	FRA	Sikou Niakaté (on loan to Metz)
28	DF	FRA	Jérémy Mellot (to (Spain) Tenerife)
—	FW	FRA	Axel Urie (to Créteil)
—	DF	FRA	Yohan Baret (to Avranches, previously on loan)
—	DF	POR	Pedro Rebocho (to (Poland) Lech Poznań, previously on loan at (Portugal) Paços de Ferreira)
—	MF	FRA	Mehdi Boudjemaa (to (Turkey) Hatayspor, previously on loan at Laval)

=== Amiens ===
In:

No.	Pos.	Nation	Player
2	DF	MLI	Mamadou Fofana (from Metz)
4	DF	GHA	Nicholas Opoku (from (Italy) Udinese, previously on loan)
5	DF	SEN	Formose Mendy (from (Belgium) Club NXT)
6	MF	FRA	Mamadou Fofana (from Le Havre)
9	FW	NGA	Tolu Arokodare (on loan from (Latvia) Valmiera, previously on loan at (Germany) 1. FC Köln)
17	FW	SEN	Aliou Badji (on loan from (Egypt) Al Ahly, previously on loan at Ankaragücü)
18	DF	FRA	Harouna Sy (from Dunkerque)

Out:

No.	Pos.	Nation	Player
5	DF	MLI	Molla Wagué (loan return to Nantes)
8	DF	SEN	Racine Coly (loan return to Nice)
7	MF	BFA	Abou Ouattara (loan return to Lille B)
9	FW	NGA	Stephen Odey (loan return to (Belgium) Genk)
17	MF	FRA	Alexis Blin (to (Italy) Lecce)
18	MF	MLI	Sambou Yatabaré (to Valenciennes)
30	GK	FRA	Grégoire Coudert (to Brest)
32	FW	FRA	Darell Tokpa (on loan to Red Star)
34	MF	MAR	Ayman Ouhatti (on loan to Orléans)
35	DF	FRA	Valentin Gendrey (to (Italy) Lecce)
36	FW	FRA	Florian Bianchini (on loan to Avranches)
—	MF	COD	Gaël Kakuta (to Lens, previously on loan)
—	FW	MAR	Driss Khalid (to Yzeure, previously on loan at Orléans)

=== Valenciennes ===
In:

No.	Pos.	Nation	Player
1	GK	BEN	Saturnin Allagbé (on loan from Dijon)
7	MF	TOG	Floyd Ayité (from (Turkey) Gençlerbirliği)
19	MF	BFA	Abou Ouattara (from Lille B, previously on loan at Amiens)
22	MF	MLI	Sambou Yatabaré (from Amiens)
26	DF	FRA	Mathieu Debuchy (from Saint-Étienne)
30	GK	FRA	Lucas Chevalier (on loan from Lille)

Out:

No.	Pos.	Nation	Player
1	GK	FRA	Jérôme Prior (to (Spain) Cartagena)
6	MF	GEO	Jaba Kankava (to (Slovakia) Slovan Bratislava)
7	FW	CIV	Moussa Guel (on loan to Red Star)
19	DF	SEN	Elhadj Dabo (to Créteil)
22	FW	TUR	Metehan Güçlü (loan return to Rennes)
23	DF	FRA	Théo Pellenard (to Auxerre)
29	FW	CIV	Issouf Macalou (on loan to Le Mans)
30	GK	FRA	Nicolas Kocik (on loan to Cholet)
—	DF	CMR	Frédéric Bong (to ASESG, previously on loan at Lyon La Duchère)

=== Le Havre ===
In:

No.	Pos.	Nation	Player
4	DF	FRA	Thierno Baldé (on loan from Paris Saint-Germain)

Out:

No.	Pos.	Nation	Player
6	DF	FRA	Romain Basque (to (Azerbaijan) Neftçi)
24	MF	FRA	Mamadou Fofana (to Amiens)

=== Ajaccio ===
In:

No.	Pos.	Nation	Player
15	DF	FRA	Clément Vidal (on loan from Montpellier)
25	DF	CMR	Oumar Gonzalez (from Chambly)

Out:

No.	Pos.	Nation	Player
8	DF	FRA	Jérémy Corinus (to (Italy) Fermana)
11	DF	FRA	Quentin Lecoeuche (loan return to Lorient)
12	MF	MLI	Abdoulaye Keita (loan return to (Greece) Olympiacos)
17	MF	FRA	Tony Njiké (on loan to Cholet)
18	FW	COM	Faiz Mattoir (on loan to Cholet)
28	DF	FRA	Joris Sainati (to Bastia)
40	GK	FRA	Lucas Marsella (to Martigues)
—	MF	FRA	Lucas Pellegrini (on loan to Bastia-Borgo, previously on loan at Le Puy)
—	FW	FRA	Simon Elisor (on loan to Villefranche, previously on loan at Sète 34)

=== Pau ===
In:

No.	Pos.	Nation	Player
1	GK	FRA	Alexandre Olliero (from Nantes, previously on loan)
8	DF	FRA	Mahamadou Dembélé (reloan from Troyes)
10	MF	SRB	Jovan Nišić (from (Serbia) Voždovac)
11	FW	FRA	Djibril Dianessy (from (Netherlands) Fortuna Sittard, previously on loan at (Netherlands) MVV Maastricht)
12	MF	FRA	Eddy Sylvestre (on loan from (Belgium) Standard Liège)
14	DF	FRA	Kenji-Van Boto (on loan from Auxerre)
16	GK	SEN	Massamba Ndiaye (from (Senegal) CNEPS Excellence)
26	DF	FRA	Jean Lambert Evans (from (Italy) Crotone, previously on loan at (Italy) Livorno)
28	FW	GNB	David Gomis (from Clermont)
29	FW	FRA	Samuel Essende (from Avranches)

Out:

No.	Pos.	Nation	Player
3	DF	FRA	Scotty Sadzoute (loan return to Lille)
10	MF	FRA	Romain Bayard (to (Switzerland) Stade Lausanne Ouchy)
11	FW	SEN	Cheikh Sabaly (loan return to Metz)
12	FW	CRC	Mayron George (loan return to (Denmark) Midtjylland)
14	MF	MLI	Souleymane Diarra (to Guingamp)
23	DF	FRA	Anthony Scaramozzino (to Bourg-en-Bresse)
24	DF	COM	Younn Zahary (loan return to Caen)
26	FW	BRA	Itaitinga (loan return to (Switzerland) Sion)
29	FW	FRA	Moulaye Ba (to Bastia-Borgo)

=== Rodez ===
In:

No.	Pos.	Nation	Player
1	GK	FRA	Marc Vidal (from Blagnac)
5	MF	FRA	Enzo Zidane (free agent)
8	MF	FRA	Lorenzo Rajot (from Clermont)
12	FW	FRA	Killian Corredor (from Toulouse B)
14	DF	FRA	Bradley Danger (from Chambly)
19	MF	FRA	Lucas Buadés (from Nîmes)
24	DF	FRA	Adilson Malanda (from Nîmes B)
25	FW	FRA	Clément Depres (from Nîmes)

Out:

No.	Pos.	Nation	Player
1	GK	FRA	Théo Guivarch (to (Switzerland) Neuchâtel Xamax)
3	FW	FRA	Boris Mathis (to Guingamp B)
5	DF	BEN	Yohan Roche (to (Turkey) Adanaspor)
8	MF	FRA	Pierre Ruffaut (to Cholet)
14	MF	FRA	Loïc Poujol (retired)
17	DF	FRA	Nathanaël Dieng (to Red Star)
22	MF	FRA	David Douline (to (Switzerland) Servette)
25	MF	FRA	Julien Ponceau (loan return to Lorient)
26	FW	FRA	Ayoub Ouhafsa (to (Switzerland) Neuchâtel Xamax)
28	DF	FRA	Valentin Henry (to Sochaux)
29	DF	FRA	Grégory Coelho (on loan to Sète 34)
—	DF	FRA	Corentin Jacob (on loan to Concarneau, previously on loan at Lyon La Duchère)
—	FW	SEN	Daouda Gueye (to Marseille B, previously on loan at Sète 34)

=== Caen ===
In:

No.	Pos.	Nation	Player
15	MF	CMR	Franklin Wadja (from Lorient)
25	DF	TUN	Ali Abdi (from Paris)

Out:

No.	Pos.	Nation	Player
1	GK	FRA	Garissone Innocent (loan return to Paris Saint-Germain)
10	FW	MAR	Yacine Bammou (to (Turkey) Ümraniyespor)
15	MF	FRA	Aliou Traoré (loan return to (England) Manchester United)
20	DF	BFA	Steeve Yago (to (Cyprus) Aris Limassol)
22	DF	SEN	Adama Mbengue (to Châteauroux)
26	MF	FRA	Alexis Beka Beka (to (Russia) Lokomotiv Moscow)
27	MF	FRA	Azzeddine Toufiqui (to (Netherlands) Emmen)
29	MF	FRA	Jessy Pi (to Dijon)
35	FW	FRA	Kévin Mbala (on loan to Bastia-Borgo)
—	MF	FRA	Godson Kyeremeh (loan extension to Annecy)
—	GK	FRA	Marvin Golitin (to Bobigny, previously on loan)
—	DF	COM	Younn Zahary (to Cholet, previously on loan at Pau)
—	FW	CGO	Herman Moussaki (to Boulogne, previously on loan)

=== Dunkerque ===
In:

No.	Pos.	Nation	Player
7	FW	BEN	Désiré Segbé Azankpo (from Villefranche)
12	MF	FRA	Mohamed Ouadah (from Laval)
17	MF	FRA	Bilal Brahimi (from Le Havre B)
22	DF	FRA	Driss Trichard (from Clermont)

Out:

No.	Pos.	Nation	Player
7	FW	FRA	Guillaume Bosca (to Red Star)
8	MF	FRA	Thibault Vialla (to Red Star)
17	DF	FRA	Harouna Sy (to Amiens)
20	MF	FRA	Ilan Kebbal (loan return to Reims)
22	MF	CGO	Randi Goteni (to Laval)
25	FW	GLP	Jorris Romil (to Chambly)

=== Chamois Niortais ===
In:

No.	Pos.	Nation	Player
7	MF	TUN	Moataz Zemzemi (from Strasbourg, previously on loan at Avranches)
20	FW	FRA	Yanis Merdji (from Châteauroux)
26	MF	FRA	Samy Benchamma (from Montpellier)
40	GK	FRA	Jean Louchet (from Les Herbiers)

Out:

No.	Pos.	Nation	Player
8	MF	FRA	Olivier Kemen (to (Turkey) Kayserispor)
10	MF	FRA	Valentin Jacob (to Dijon)
17	MF	GAB	Louis Ameka (to (Morocco) Maghreb de Fès)
18	FW	FRA	Goduine Koyalipou (to (Switzerland) Lausanne)
20	FW	FRA	Antoine Baroan (to (Bulgaria) Botev Plovdiv)
24	MF	COM	Yacine Bourhane (to (Netherlands) Go Ahead Eagles)
36	DF	FRA	Gabin Delguel (to Bergerac)
40	GK	FRA	Emyl Leclercq (to Cholet)

=== Bastia ===
In:

No.	Pos.	Nation	Player
16	GK	FRA	Thomas Vincensini (from Lens, previously on loan)
19	FW	ALG	Idriss Saadi (from Strasbourg)
20	MF	FRA	Kylian Kaïboué (from Montpellier, previously on loan at Sète 34)
21	FW	FRA	Adil Taoui (free agent)
23	DF	GAB	Lloyd Palun (from Guingamp)
28	DF	FRA	Joris Sainati (from Ajaccio)
29	FW	FRA	Kenny Nagera (on loan from Paris Saint-Germain)
30	GK	HAI	Johny Placide (from (Bulgaria) Tsarsko Selo)

Out:

No.	Pos.	Nation	Player
1	GK	FRA	Sébastien Lombard (retired)
20	FW	FRA	Sébastien Da Silva (to Laval)
26	DF	FRA	Lorenz Assignon (loan return to Rennes B)
27	FW	FRA	Florian Raspentino (to Bastia-Borgo)
29	DF	FRA	Gilles Cioni (retired)

=== Quevilly-Rouen ===
In:

No.	Pos.	Nation	Player
1	GK	FRA	Nicolas Lemaître (from Reims, previously on loan)
3	DF	FRA	Till Cissokho (on loan from Clermont, previously on loan at Austria Lustenau)
9	FW	HAI	Duckens Nazon (from (Belgium) Sint-Truiden)
12	MF	FRA	Garland Gbelle (from Lyon La Duchère)
13	MF	FRA	Yann Boé-Kane (from (Romania) Astra Giurgiu)
14	DF	FRA	Nathan Dekoke (from Lyon La Duchère)
18	DF	SEN	Souleymane Cissé (from (Spain) Celta Vigo B, previously on loan at (Spain) Arenteiro)
22	DF	HAI	Stéphane Lambese (from Orléans)
29	MF	FRA	Cyril Zabou (from Chambly)
30	GK	FRA	Louis Pelletier (from Reims B)
—	MF	FRA	Kalidou Sidibé (on loan from Toulouse, previously on loan at Châteauroux)

Out:

No.	Pos.	Nation	Player
3	DF	FRA	Mickaël Nadé (loan return to Saint-Étienne)
8	DF	FRA	Sambou Sissoko (loan return to Reims)
9	FW	FRA	Andrew Jung (loan return to Châteauroux)
16	GK	FRA	Romain Hanquinquant (to Alençon)
23	DF	FRA	Adrien Pianelli (to Rouen)
24	DF	FRA	Jordan Gobron (to Béziers)
29	MF	FRA	Lucas Toussaint (to Martigues)
33	MF	FRA	Mathéo Remars (to Stade Briochin)

== See also ==
- 2021–22 Ligue 1
- 2021–22 Ligue 2
