= Brahima Doukansy =

French footballer (born 1999)

Personal information
- Date of birth: 21 August 1999 (age 27)
- Place of birth: Paris, France
- Height: 1.88 m (6 ft 2 in)
- Position: Midfielder

Team information
- Current team: Aubagne Air Bel
- Number: 19

Youth career
- 2009–2012: Solitaires Paris-Est
- 2012–2013: Espérance Paris
- 2013–2014: Amiens
- 2016–2017: Marseille

Senior career*
| Years | Team | Apps | (Gls) |
| 2017 | Marseille B | 9 | (0) |
| 2018 | Saint-Étienne B | 0 | (0) |
| 2018–2022 | Niort B | 21 | (0) |
| 2019–2022 | Niort | 63 | (1) |
| 2022–2023 | Aubagne | 20 | (0) |
| 2023–2025 | Nîmes | 54 | (1) |
| 2025–2026 | Petrolul Ploiești | 14 | (0) |
| 2026– | Aubagne Air Bel | 1 | (0) |
- * Club domestic league appearances and goals as of 29 August 2026

Brahima Doukansy (born 21 August 1999) is a French professional footballer who plays as a midfielder for Ligue 3 club Aubagne Air Bel.

== Career ==
=== Early career ===
Doukansy spent part of his youth career with Marseille before joining Saint-Étienne, although he did not make a first-team appearance at either club.

=== Niort ===
Doukansy made his professional debut for Niort on 19 April 2019, in a 1–2 Ligue 2 defeat to Châteauroux. He signed his first professional contract with the club the following month, aged 19.

Doukansy left Niort at the end of the 2021–22 season, having made 66 appearances in all competitions.

=== Aubagne ===
Doukansy dropped into Championnat National 2 for the 2022–23 season, signing for Aubagne, where he made 20 league appearances as a regular in midfield.

=== Nîmes ===
In July 2023, Doukansy moved to Nîmes, newly relegated to the Championnat National. He featured in 27 league games without scoring during his debut campaign.

=== Petrolul Ploiești ===
On 26 June 2025, Doukansy moved abroad for the first time by joining Romanian side Petrolul Ploiești on a three-year deal.

== Personal life ==
Born in Paris, Doukansy is of Malian descent.

== Career statistics ==
As of 4 December 2025

Appearances and goals by club, season and competition
| Club | Season | League | | | National cup (Note: Includes Coupe de France) | | Other | | Total | |
| Club | Season | Division | Apps | Goals | Apps | Goals | Apps | Goals | Apps | Goals |
|---|---|---|---|---|---|---|---|---|---|---|
| Marseille B | 2016–17 | CFA | 6 | 0 | — | | — | | 6 | 0 |
| Marseille B | 2017–18 | Championnat National 2 | 3 | 0 | — | | — | | 3 | 0 |
| Marseille B | Total | | 9 | 0 | — | | — | | 9 | 0 |
| Niort B | 2018–19 | Championnat National 3 | 8 | 0 | — | | — | | 8 | 0 |
| Niort B | 2019–20 | Championnat National 3 | 5 | 0 | — | | — | | 5 | 0 |
| Niort B | 2021–22 | Championnat National 3 | 8 | 0 | — | | — | | 8 | 0 |
| Niort B | Total | | 21 | 0 | — | | — | | 21 | 0 |
| Niort | 2018–19 | Ligue 2 | 4 | 0 | 0 | 0 | — | | 4 | 0 |
| Niort | 2019–20 | Ligue 2 | 11 | 0 | 1 | 0 | 0 | 0 | 12 | 0 |
| Niort | 2020–21 | Ligue 2 | 28 | 1 | 1 | 0 | 1 (Note: Appearance in Ligue 2 relegation play-offs) | 0 | 30 | 1 |
| Niort | 2021–22 | Ligue 2 | 20 | 0 | — (Note: Niort excluded from the 2021–22 Coupe de France) | | — | | 20 | 0 |
| Niort | Total | | 63 | 1 | 2 | 0 | 1 | 0 | 66 | 1 |
| Aubagne | 2022–23 | Championnat National 2 | 20 | 0 | 3 | 0 | — | | 23 | 0 |
| Nîmes | 2023–24 | Championnat National | 27 | 0 | 2 | 0 | — | | 29 | 0 |
| Nîmes | 2024–25 | Championnat National | 27 | 1 | 0 | 0 | — | | 27 | 1 |
| Nîmes | Total | | 54 | 1 | 2 | 0 | — | | 56 | 1 |
| Petrolul Ploiești | 2025–26 | Liga I | 14 | 0 | 3 | 1 | — | | 17 | 1 |
| Aubagne Air Bel | 2026–27 | Ligue 3 | 0 | 0 | 0 | 0 | — | | 0 | 0 |
| Career total | | | 181 | 2 | 10 | 1 | 1 | 0 | 192 | 3 |
