= Yacine Bourhane =

Footballer (born 1998)

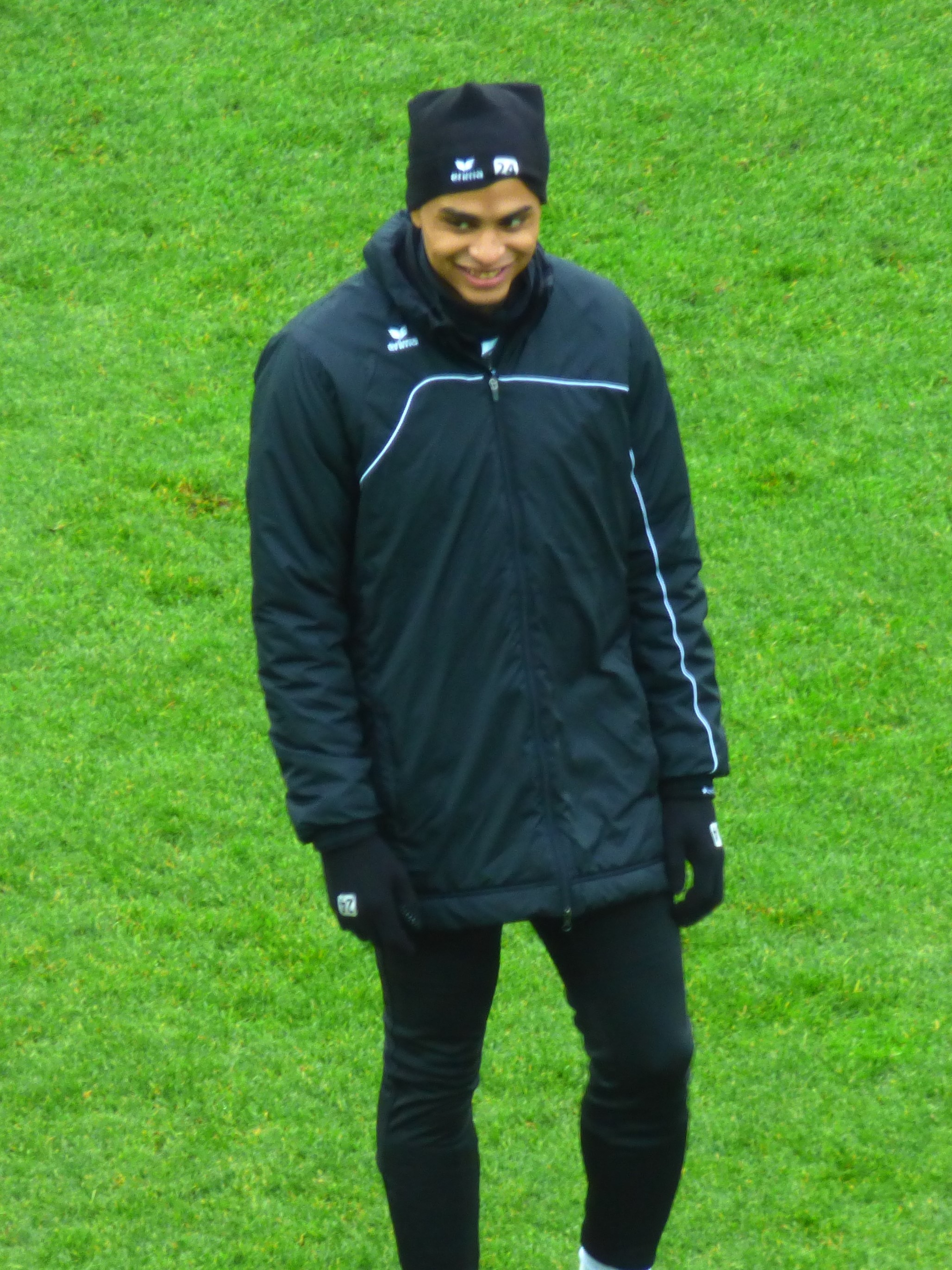
- Bourhane in 2019

Personal information
- Date of birth: 30 September 1998 (age 28)
- Place of birth: Noisy-le-Grand, France
- Height: 1.84 m (6 ft 0 in)
- Position: Midfielder

Team information
- Current team: Motor Lublin
- Number: 27

Youth career
- –2014: Torcy
- 2014–2016: Niort

Senior career*
Years	Team	Apps	(Gls)
2016–2021	Niort II	42	(3)
2017–2021	Niort	67	(1)
2021–2022	Go Ahead Eagles	4	(0)
2022–2025	Esbjerg fB	89	(6)
2025–2026	Aris Limassol	24	(0)
2026–	Motor Lublin	12	(1)

International career^{‡}
2020–	Comoros	41	(1)
- * Club domestic league appearances and goals as of 15:12, 9 November 2026 (UTC) ‡ National team caps and goals as of 23:34, 17 November 2026 (UTC)

Yacine Bourhane (born 30 September 1998) is a professional footballer who plays as a midfielder for Ekstraklasa club Motor Lublin. Born in France, he plays for the Comoros national team.

== Club career ==
Bourhane started his career with French side Chamois Niortais. He made his Ligue 2 debut on 16 October 2017, coming on as a substitute for Tom Lebeau in the 0–0 draw with Lorient. He signed for Go Ahead Eagles in July 2021.

On 31 January 2022, Bourhane joined Danish 1st Division club Esbjerg fB on a deal until the end of 2024.

On 16 July 2025, Bourhane signed a two-year contract with Cypriot First Division club Aris Limassol.

On 14 July 2026, he moved to Polish Ekstraklasa club Motor Lublin on a deal until mid-2028.

== International career ==
Born in France, Bourhane holds French and Comorian nationalities. Bourhane debuted for the Comoros national team in a 2–1 friendly win over Libya on 11 October 2020.

He was included in the Comoros' 2021 Africa Cup of Nations squad.

On 11 December 2025, Bourhane was called up to the Comoros squad for the 2025 Africa Cup of Nations.

== Career statistics ==
=== Club ===
As of match played 6 November 2026

Appearances and goals by club, season and competition
Club	Season	League			National cup (Note: Includes Coupe de France, KNVB Cup, Danish Cup, Polish Cup)		League cup (Note: Includes Coupe de la Ligue)		Other		Total	
Club	Season	Division	Apps	Goals	Apps	Goals	Apps	Goals	Apps	Goals	Apps	Goals
Niort	2017–18	Ligue 2	14	0	1	0	0	0	—		15	0
Niort	2018–19	Ligue 2	18	0	1	0	1	0	—		20	0
Niort	2019–20	Ligue 2	7	0	2	0	3	0	—		12	0
Niort	2020–21	Ligue 2	28	1	1	0	—		2 (Note: Appearances in Ligue 2 relegation playoffs)	0	31	1
Niort	Total		67	1	5	0	4	0	2	0	78	1
Go Ahead Eagles	2021–22	Eredivisie	4	0	2	0	—		—		6	0
Esbjerg fB	2021–22	Danish 1st Division	10	0	—		—		—		10	0
Esbjerg fB	2022–23	Danish 2nd Division	26	1	1	0	—		—		27	1
Esbjerg fB	2023–24	Danish 2nd Division	24	3	1	0	—		—		25	3
Esbjerg fB	2024–25	Danish 1st Division	29	2	1	0	—		—		30	2
Esbjerg fB	Total		89	6	3	0	—		—		92	6
Aris Limassol	2025–26	Cypriot First Division	24	0	0	0	—		2 (Note: Appearances in UEFA Conference League)	0	26	0
Motor Lublin	2026–27	Ekstraklasa	12	1	2	0	—		—		14	1
Career total			196	8	12	0	4	0	4	0	216	8

=== International ===
As of match played 17 November 2026

Appearances and goals by national team and year
National team	Year	Apps	Goals
Comoros
Comoros	2020	3	0
Comoros	2021	5	0
Comoros	2022	3	0
Comoros	2023	6	0
Comoros	2024	10	1
Comoros	2025	8	0
Comoros	2026	6	0
Total		41	1

Scores and results list Comoros' goal tally first, score column indicates score after each Bourhane goal.

List of international goals scored by Yacine Bourhane
No.	Date	Venue	Opponent	Score	Result	Competition
1	18 November 2024	Grand Stade d'Al Hoceima, Al Hoceima, Morocco	Madagascar	1–0	1–0	2025 Africa Cup of Nations qualification

== Honours ==
Esbjerg fB

- Danish 2nd Division: 2023–24
