= Ibrahima Conté (footballer, born 1996) =

Guinean footballer

Personal information
- Full name: Ibrahima Sory Conté
- Date of birth: 3 April 1996 (age 30)
- Place of birth: Conakry, Guinea
- Height: 1.91 m (6 ft 3 in)
- Position: Defender

Team information
- Current team: Al-Minaa

Youth career
- –2013: CI Kamsar
- 2013–2015: Satellite

Senior career*
Years	Team	Apps	(Gls)
2015–2017	Lorient B	33	(3)
2017–2019	Lorient	26	(2)
2018–2019	→ Chamois Niortais (loan)	18	(2)
2019–2023	Chamois Niortais	68	(1)
2023–2025	UTA Arad	55	(1)
2025–2026	Al-Minaa	0	(0)

International career^{‡}
2013–	Guinea	31	(0)
- * Club domestic league appearances and goals as of 6 October 2025 ‡ National team caps and goals as of 21 March 2025

Ibrahima Sory Conté (born 3 April 1996) is a Guinean professional footballer who plays as a defender for Iraq Stars League club Al-Minaa and Guinea national team.

== Club career ==
Conté is a youth product of the Guinean clubs Club Industriel de Kamsar and Satellite FC. He made his professional debut for Lorient in a 1–1 Ligue 2 tie with US Quevilly-Rouen on 29 July 2017.

In September 2023, Conté signed for Romanian Liga I club UTA Arad on a two-year contract.

On 6 October 2025, he moved to play in the Iraq Stars League, signing a contract with Al-Minaa.

== International career ==
Conté received his first callup to the senior Guinea national football team in August 2017.

== Career statistics ==
=== Club ===
As of matches played 17 May 2025.

Appearances and goals by club, season and competition
Club	Season	League			Coupe de France		Coupe de la Ligue		Other		Total	
Club	Season	Division	Apps	Goals	Apps	Goals	Apps	Goals	Apps	Goals	Apps	Goals
Lorient B	2014–15	CFA	10	1	—		—		—		10	1
Lorient B	2015–16	CFA	13	2	—		—		—		13	2
Lorient B	2016–17	CFA	9	0	—		—		—		9	0
Lorient B	2017–18	CFA	1	0	—		—		—		1	0
Lorient B	Total		33	3	—		—		—		33	3
Lorient	2017–18	Ligue 2	26	2	3	0	1	0	—		30	2
Chamois Niortais (loan)	2018–19	Ligue 2	18	2	2	0	1	0	—		21	2
Chamois Niortais	2019–20	Ligue 2	0	0	0	0	0	0	—		0	0
Chamois Niortais	2020–21	Ligue 2	19	0	1	0	— (Note: The Coupe de la Ligue was indefinitely suspended following the 2019–20 edition)		1 (Note: Matches played in the 2020–21 Ligue 2 relegation playoffs)	0	21	0
Chamois Niortais	2021–22	Ligue 2	28	0	— (Note: Niort excluded from the 2021–22 Coupe de France)		—		—		28	0
Chamois Niortais	2022–23	Ligue 2	21	1	1	0	—		—		22	1
Chamois Niortais	Total		86	3	4	0	1	0	1	0	92	3
UTA Arad	2023–24	Liga I	22	1	0	0	—		—		22	1
UTA Arad	2024–25	Liga I	33	0	2	0	—		—		35	0
UTA Arad	Total		55	1	2	0	—		—		57	1
Al-Minaa	2025–26	Iraq Stars League	0	0	0	0	—		—		0	0
Career total			200	9	9	0	2	0	1	0	212	9

=== International ===
As of match played 21 March 2025

Appearances and goals by national team and year
National team	Year	Apps	Goals
Guinea	2013	1	0
Guinea	2017	2	0
Guinea	2018	4	0
Guinea	2019	0	0
Guinea	2020	0	0
Guinea	2021	6	0
Guinea	2022	8	0
Guinea	2023	0	0
Guinea	2024	9	0
Guinea	2025	1	0
Total		31	0
