= Saturnin Allagbé =

Beninese footballer (born 1993)

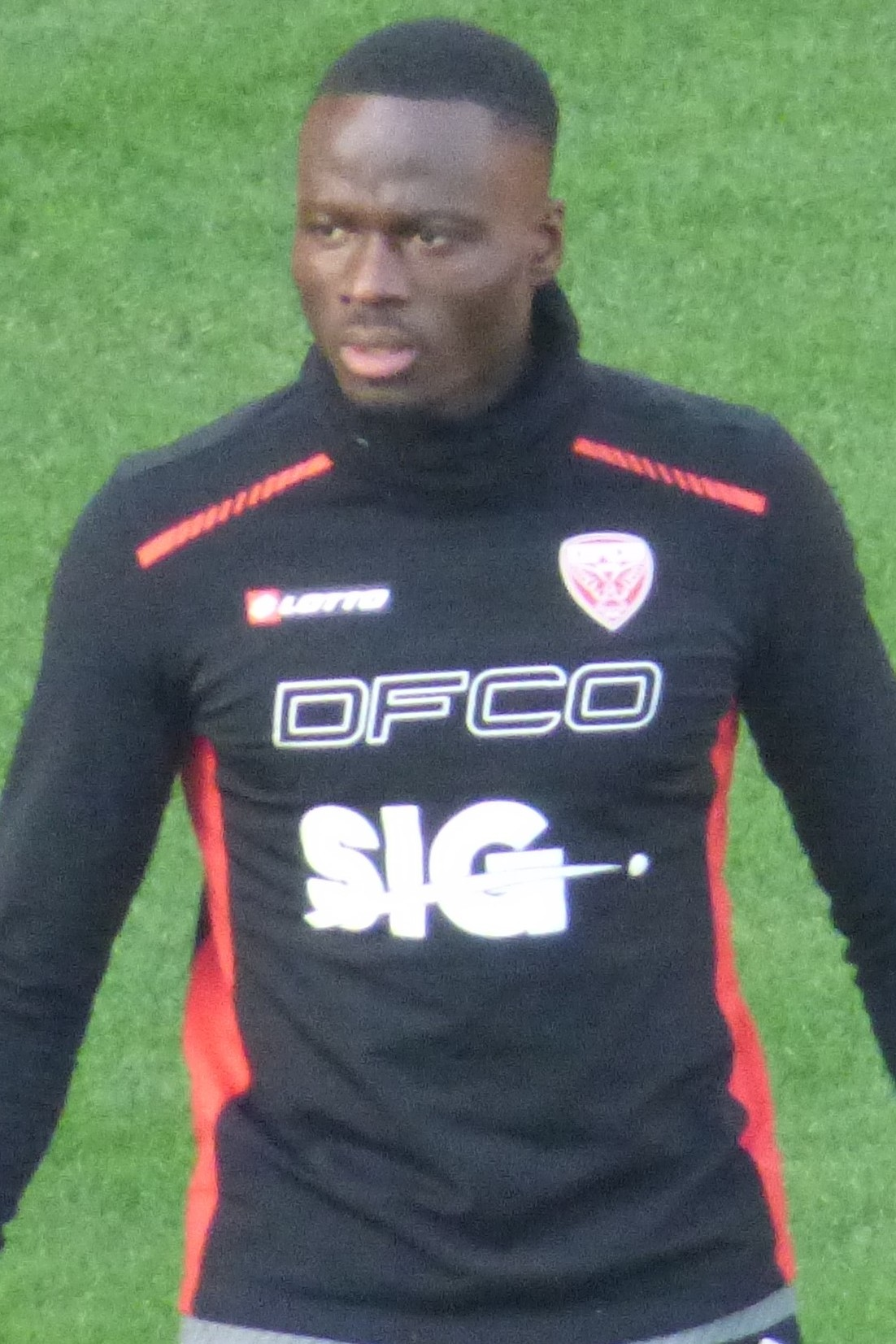
- Allagbé playing for Dijon in 2021

Personal information
- Full name: Owolabi Franck Saturnin Allagbé Kassifa
- Date of birth: 22 November 1993 (age 32)
- Place of birth: Collines, Benin
- Height: 1.89 m (6 ft 2 in)
- Position: Goalkeeper

Team information
- Current team: Chauray

Senior career*
Years	Team	Apps	(Gls)
2010–2014	ASPA Cotonou		
2014–2020	Niort	116	(0)
2015–2020	Niort B	8	(0)
2020–2024	Dijon	17	(0)
2021–2022	→ Valenciennes (loan)	8	(0)
2022–2024	Dijon B	10	(0)
2024–2025	Botev Vratsa	3	(0)
2025–	Chauray	0	(0)

International career^{‡}
2011–	Benin	46	(0)
- * Club domestic league appearances and goals as of 15:23, 17 June 2025 (UTC) ‡ National team caps and goals as of 09:17, 29 June 2024 (UTC)

Owolabi Franck Saturnin Allagbé Kassifa (born 22 November 1993) is a Beninese professional footballer who plays as a goalkeeper for French club Chauray and the Benin national team.

== Club career ==
Prior to joining Niort in the summer of 2014, Allagbé had played his whole career with the Beninese side ASPA Cotonou.

On 22 July 2021, he joined Ligue 2 club Valenciennes on loan. On 10 January 2022, the loan was terminated early following Anthony Racioppi's departure from Dijon.

== International career ==
Allagbé plays for the Benin national team. He played at the 2019 Africa Cup of Nations, where Benin reached the quarter-finals.

== Personal life ==
Allagbé holds both Beninese and French nationalities.

== Career statistics ==
=== Club ===
As of 10 January 2022

Appearances and goals by club, season and competition
Club	Season	League			National cup		League cup		Total	
Club	Season	Division	Apps	Goals	Apps	Goals	Apps	Goals	Apps	Goals
Niort	2014–15	Ligue 2	0	0	0	0	0	0	0	0
Niort	2015–16	Ligue 2	5	0	3	0	0	0	8	0
Niort	2016–17	Ligue 2	37	0	0	0	1	0	38	0
Niort	2017–18	Ligue 2	18	0	0	0	0	0	18	0
Niort	2018–19	Ligue 2	38	0	2	0	1	0	41	0
Niort	2019–20	Ligue 2	13	0	0	0	1	0	14	0
Niort	2020–21	Ligue 2	5	0	0	0	—		5	0
Niort	Total		116	0	5	0	3	0	124	0
Niort B	2015–16	CFA 2	7	0	—		—		7	0
Niort B	2019–20	National 3	1	0	—		—		1	0
Niort B	Total		8	0	—		—		8	0
Dijon	2020–21	Ligue 1	12	0	1	0	—		13	0
Dijon	2021–22	Ligue 2	0	0	0	0	—		0	0
Dijon	Total		12	0	1	0	—		13	0
Valenciennes (loan)	2021–22	Ligue 2	8	0	0	0	—		8	0
Career total			144	0	6	0	3	0	153	0

=== International ===
As of 29 June 2024

Appearances and goals by national team and year
National team	Year	Apps	Goals
Benin	2011	1	0
Benin	2012	0	0
Benin	2013	3	0
Benin	2014	4	0
Benin	2015	2	0
Benin	2016	0	0
Benin	2017	1	0
Benin	2018	0	0
Benin	2019	7	0
Benin	2020	3	0
Benin	2021	9	0
Benin	2022	7	0
Benin	2023	7	0
Benin	2024	1	0
Total		45	0
