= Bradley M'bondo =

French footballer (born 2001)

Personal information
- Full name: Bradley Hodillon Matufueni M'bondo
- Date of birth: 30 October 2001 (age 25)
- Place of birth: Paris, France
- Height: 1.84 m (6 ft 0 in)
- Position: Defender

Team information
- Current team: Maribor
- Number: 6

Youth career
- 2011–2017: Drancy
- 2017–2018: Niort

Senior career*
Years	Team	Apps	(Gls)
2018–2023	Niort II	33	(1)
2020–2024	Niort	69	(3)
2024–	Maribor	80	(1)
- * Club domestic league appearances and goals as of 22 November 2026

Bradley Hodillon Matufueni M'bondo (born 30 October 2001) is a French professional footballer who plays as a defender for Slovenian PrvaLiga club Maribor.

== Career ==
M'bondo is a youth product of Drancy, and joined the youth academy of Niort in 2017. He made his professional debut with Niort in a 2–2 Ligue 2 tie with Paris FC on 26 September 2020.

== Career statistics ==
As of 1 February 2022

Appearances and goals by club, season and competition
Club	Season	League			National cup		Total	
Club	Season	Division	Apps	Goals	Apps	Goals	Apps	Goals
Niort	2020–21	Ligue 2	7	1	0	0	7	1
Niort	2021–22	Ligue 2	13	0	—		13	0
Niort	Total		20	1	0	0	20	1
Career total			20	1	0	0	20	1
