= Lenny Vallier =

French association football player (born 1999)

Personal information
- Date of birth: 24 April 1999 (age 27)
- Place of birth: Stains, France
- Height: 1.78 m (5 ft 10 in)
- Position: Left-back

Team information
- Current team: Dunkerque

Youth career
- 2005–2008: US Alfortville
- 2008–2009: Bonneuil-sur-Marne CS
- 2009–2010: Choisy-Le-Roi AS
- 2011–2012: US Alfortville
- 2012–2014: Centre de Formation de Paris
- 2014–2017: Stade Reims

Senior career*
Years	Team	Apps	(Gls)
2016–2020	Stade Reims II	53	(2)
2017–2020	Stade Reims	2	(0)
2018–2019	→ Pau (loan)	29	(0)
2020–2023	Niort	82	(3)
2023–2025	Guingamp	26	(0)
2025–2026	Nacional	14	(0)
2026–	Dunkerque	0	(0)

International career^{‡}
2015	France U16	7	(0)
2015–2016	France U17	2	(0)
2016	France U18	4	(0)
2018	France U19	1	(0)
- * Club domestic league appearances and goals as of 25 May 2026 ‡ National team caps and goals as of 26 September 2020

Lenny Vallier (born 24 April 1999) is a French professional footballer who plays as a left-back for Ligue 2 club Dunkerque.

== Professional career ==
Born in France to French and Malagasy Martiniquais roots, Vallier helped Stade de Reims win the 2017–18 Ligue 2, helping promote them to the Ligue 1 for the 2018-19 season.

On 18 July 2023, Vallier signed with Guingamp.

On 30 June 2025, it was announced that Vallier had signed for Primeira Liga club Nacional for three seasons.

On 8 July 2026, Vallier signed with Dunkerque for two seasons.

== Career statistics ==
As of matches played 1 February 2022.

Appearances and goals by club, season and competition
Club	Season	League			Coupe de France		Coupe de la Ligue		Other		Total	
Club	Season	Division	Apps	Goals	Apps	Goals	Apps	Goals	Apps	Goals	Apps	Goals
Reims	2016–17	Ligue 2	1	0	0	0	0	0	—		1	0
Reims	2017–18	Ligue 2	1	0	0	0	1	0	—		2	0
Reims	Total		2	0	0	0	1	0	—		3	0
Pau (loan)	2019–20	National	29	0	2	0	—		—		31	0
Chamois Niortais	2020–21	Ligue 2	23	0	0	0	— (Note: The Coupe de la Ligue was indefinitely suspended following the 2019–20 edition)		1 (Note: Matches played in the 2020–21 Ligue 2 relegation playoffs)	0	24	0
Chamois Niortais	2021–22	Ligue 2	20	2	— (Note: Niort excluded from the 2021–22 Coupe de France)		—		—		20	2
Chamois Niortais	Total		43	2	0	0	—		1	0	44	2
Career total			74	2	2	0	1	0	1	0	78	2

== Honours ==
Reims

- Ligue 2 (1): 2017–18
