= Mathieu Michel (footballer) =

French professional footballer (born 1991)

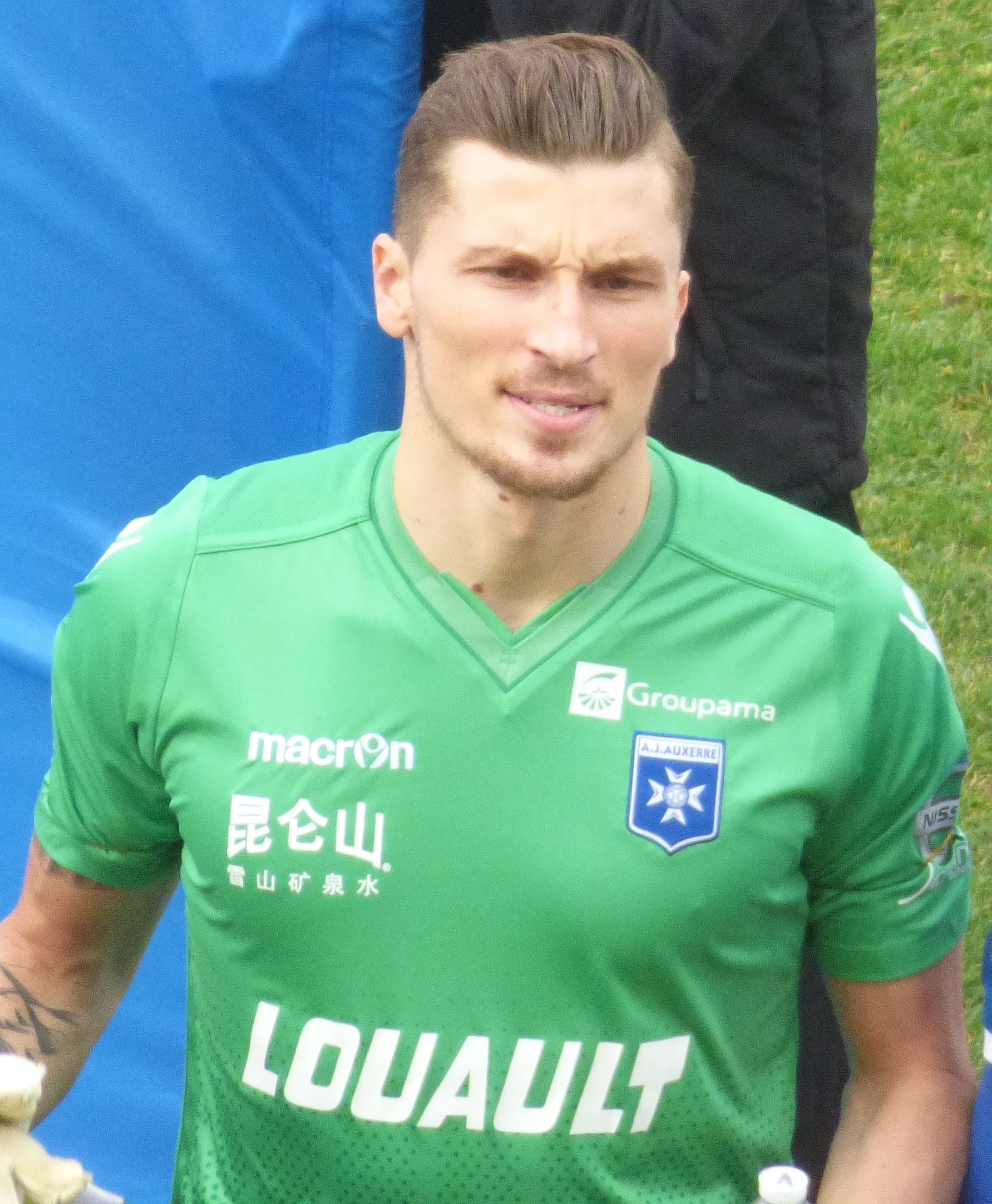
- Michel with Auxerre in 2019

Personal information
- Date of birth: 4 September 1991 (age 35)
- Place of birth: Nîmes, France
- Height: 1.88 m (6 ft 2 in)
- Position: Goalkeeper

Team information
- Current team: Montpellier
- Number: 1

Youth career
- 1999–2014: Nîmes

Senior career*
Years	Team	Apps	(Gls)
2012–2016	Nîmes	79	(0)
2016–2018	Angers	30	(0)
2018–2020	Auxerre	50	(0)
2020–2023	Niort	68	(0)
2023–2025	Ajaccio	21	(0)
2024–2025	→ Valenciennes (loan)	23	(0)
2025–	Montpellier	1	(0)
- * Club domestic league appearances and goals as of 5 January 2026

Mathieu Michel (born 4 September 1991) is a French professional footballer who plays as a goalkeeper for Ligue 2 club Montpellier. He has also represented Nimes, Angers, Auxerre and Chamois Niortais.

== Career ==
Michel is a youth exponent from Nîmes Olympique. He made his Ligue 2 debut on 23 August 2013 against Tours in a 3–1 away defeat. He played the entire game.

On 16 August 2016, after 17 years at Nîmes Olympique, Michel transferred to Ligue 1 club Angers SCO on a three-year deal.

On 31 August 2018, the last day of the 2018 summer transfer window, he joined Ligue 2 side AJ Auxerre.

On 14 October 2024, Michel joined Valenciennes on loan until the end of the season.

== Career statistics ==
=== Club ===
As of matches played 17 May 2024.

Appearances and goals by club, season and competition
Club	Season	League			Cup		League Cup		Total	
Club	Season	Division	Apps	Goals	Apps	Goals	Apps	Goals	Apps	Goals
Nîmes Olympique	2013–14	Ligue 2	2	0	0	0	2	0	4	0
Nîmes Olympique	2014–15	Ligue 2	38	0	0	0	1	0	39	0
Nîmes Olympique	2015–16	Ligue 2	37	0	0	0	0	0	37	0
Nîmes Olympique	2016–17	Ligue 2	2	0	0	0	0	0	2	0
Nîmes Olympique	Total		79	0	0	0	3	0	82	0
Angers	2016–17	Ligue 1	23	0	3	0	0	0	26	0
Angers	2017–18	Ligue 1	7	0	1	0	0	0	8	0
Angers	2018–19	Ligue 1	0	0	—		—		0	0
Angers	Total		30	0	4	0	0	0	34	0
Auxerre	2018–19	Ligue 2	23	0	0	0	0	0	23	0
Auxerre	2019–20	Ligue 2	27	0	0	0	0	0	27	0
Auxerre	Total		50	0	0	0	0	0	50	0
Niort	2020–21	Ligue 2	23	0	1	0	— (Note: The Coupe de la Ligue was indefinitely suspended following the 2019–20 edition)		24	0
Niort	2021–22	Ligue 2	12	0	— (Note: Niort excluded from the 2021–22 Coupe de France)		—		12	0
Niort	2022–23	Ligue 2	33	0	1	0	—		34	0
Niort	Total		68	0	2	0	—		70	0
Ajaccio	2023–24	Ligue 2	21	0	0	0	—		21	0
Ajaccio	2024–25	Ligue 2	0	0	0	0	—		0	0
Ajaccio	Total		21	0	0	0	—		21	0
Career total			248	0	6	0	3	0	257	0

== Honours ==
- Coupe de France runner-up: 2017
