= Antoine Baroan =

French footballer (born 2000)

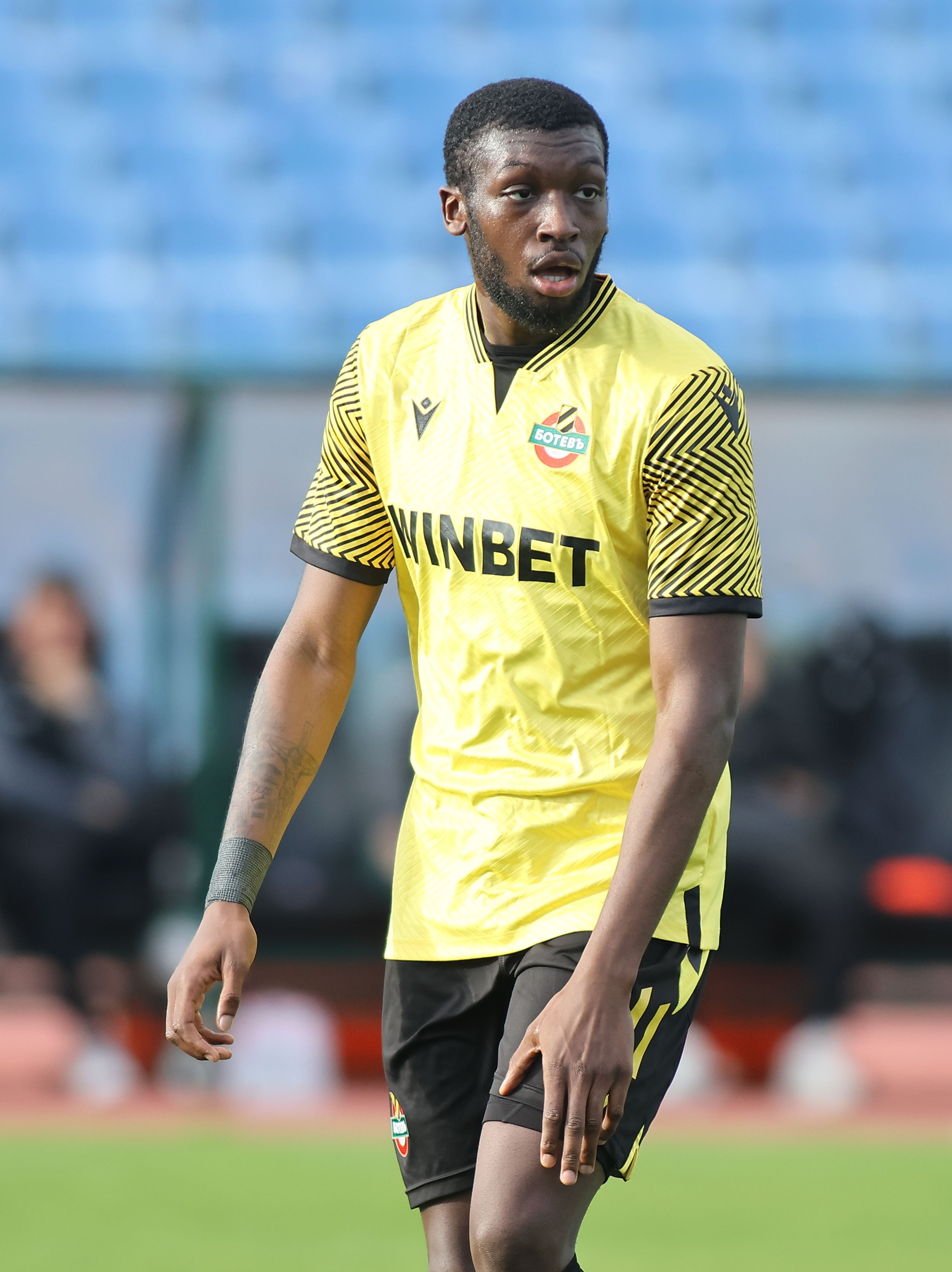
- Baroan with Botev Plovdiv

Personal information
- Full name: Antoine Gilbert Baroan
- Date of birth: 24 June 2000 (age 26)
- Place of birth: Niort, France
- Height: 1.87 m (6 ft 2 in)
- Position: Forward

Team information
- Current team: Rapid București

Youth career
- 2007–2009: La Crèche
- 2009–2017: Niort

Senior career*
Years	Team	Apps	(Gls)
2017–2021	Chamois Niortais B	41	(21)
2018–2021	Chamois Niortais	24	(1)
2021–2024	Botev Plovdiv	70	(27)
2024–2025	Winterthur	33	(5)
2025	→ Ludogorets Razgrad (loan)	6	(1)
2025–	Rapid București	14	(2)
2026	→ AVS (loan)	0	(0)

International career
2016	France U17	1	(0)
- * Club domestic league appearances and goals as of 23 November 2025

Antoine Gilbert Baroan (born 24 June 2000) is a French professional footballer who plays as a forward for Liga I club Rapid București.

== Club career ==
Baroan joined the youth academy of Chamois Niortais in 2009. Baroan made his professional debut with Niort in a 1–0 Ligue 2 win over AS Nancy on 24 August 2018.

On 25 June 2021, Baroan moved aboard and joined the Bulgarian Parva Liga team Botev Plovdiv.

On 2 February 2024, Baroan signed a three-and-a-half-year contract with Winterthur in Switzerland.

On 25 February 2025, he returned to Bulgaria, joining Ludogorets for an undisclosed fee, after just one year at Winterthur.

On 8 July 2025, Baroan signed a two-season contract with Romanian SuperLiga club Rapid București.

== International career ==
Baroan was born in France, the son of Ivorian former footballer Celestine Baroan. Baroan made one appearance for the France U17s in a 1–0 friendly win over the Czech Republic U17s on 23 September 2016.

== Career statistics ==
As of match played 5 February 2026

Appearances and goals by club, season and competition
Club	Season	League			National cup (Note: Includes Coupe de France, Bulgarian Cup, Swiss Cup, Cupa României, Taça de Portugal)		Europe		Other		Total	
Club	Season	Division	Apps	Goals	Apps	Goals	Apps	Goals	Apps	Goals	Apps	Goals
Chamois Niortais B	2016–17	CFA 2	2	1	—		—		—		2	1
Chamois Niortais B	2017–18	Championnat National 3	14	5	—		—		—		14	5
Chamois Niortais B	2018–19	Championnat National 3	17	12	—		—		—		17	12
Chamois Niortais B	2019–20	Championnat National 3	7	2	—		—		—		7	2
Chamois Niortais B	2020–21	Championnat National 3	1	1	—		—		—		1	1
Chamois Niortais B	Total		41	21	—		—		—		41	21
Chamois Niortais	2018–19	Ligue 2	7	0	2	0	—		—		9	0
Chamois Niortais	2019–20	Ligue 2	8	0	2	1	—		1 (Note: Appearance in Coupe de la Ligue)	0	11	1
Chamois Niortais	2020–21	Ligue 2	9	1	1	0	—		0	0	10	1
Chamois Niortais	Total		24	1	5	1	—		1	0	30	1
Botev Plovdiv	2021–22	Bulgarian First League	27	5	1	0	—		0	0	28	5
Botev Plovdiv	2022–23	Bulgarian First League	31	14	2	0	1 (Note: Appearances in UEFA Conference League)	0	—		34	14
Botev Plovdiv	2023–24	Bulgarian First League	12	8	0	0	—		—		12	8
Botev Plovdiv	Total		70	27	3	0	1	0	0	0	74	27
Winterthur	2023–24	Swiss Super League	12	0	1	0	—		—		13	0
Winterthur	2024–25	Swiss Super League	21	5	2	0	—		—		23	5
Winterthur	Total		33	5	3	0	—		—		36	5
Ludogorets Razgrad (loan)	2024–25	Bulgarian First League	6	1	1	1	—		—		7	2
Rapid București	2025–26	Liga I	14	2	1	0	—		—		15	2
Rapid București	2026–27	Liga I	0	0	0	0	—		—		0	0
Rapid București	Total		14	2	1	0	—		—		15	2
AVS (loan)	2025–26	Primeira Liga	0	0	1	0	—		—		1	0
Career total			188	57	14	2	1	0	1	0	204	59

== Honours ==
Ludogorets Razgrad

- Bulgarian First League: 2024–25
- Bulgarian Cup: 2024–25
