= Joris Moutachy =

Martiniquais footballer (born 1997)

Personal information
- Date of birth: 4 November 1997 (age 29)
- Place of birth: Orléans, France
- Height: 1.77 m (5 ft 10 in)
- Position: Right-back

Team information
- Current team: Kauno Žalgiris
- Number: 45

Youth career
- Troyes

Senior career*
Years	Team	Apps	(Gls)
2015–2017	Troyes B	36	(0)
2017–2018	Athlético Marseille	4	(0)
2018–2019	Orléans B	19	(0)
2019–2020	Romorantin	21	(1)
2020–2023	Niort	88	(0)
2024–2025	Žalgiris	69	(0)
2026–	Kauno Žalgiris	20	(0)

International career^{‡}
2023–	Martinique	1	(0)
- * Club domestic league appearances and goals as of 13 July 2026 (UTC) ‡ National team caps and goals as of 06:55, 28 October 2023 (UTC)

Joris Moutachy (born 4 November 1997) is a professional footballer who plays as a right-back for Toplyga club Kauno Žalgiris. Born in mainland France, he plays for the Martinique national team.

== Professional career ==
On 20 May 2020, Moutachy signed his first professional contract with Chamois Niortais. He made his professional debut with Niort in a 1–1 Ligue 2 tie with FC Chambly on 28 August 2020.

=== Žalgiris ===
On 7 January 2024, it was announced that Moutachy had joined Lithuanian side Žalgiris.

On 3 March 2024, he made his debut in A Lyga during a 1–0 win against Dainava.

=== Kauno Žalgiris ===
On 21 November 2025, Moutachy signed with league rivals Kauno Žalgiris.

== International career ==
Born in mainland France, Moutachy is of Martiniquais descent. He was called up to the Martinique national team for a set of 2023–24 CONCACAF Nations League matches in October 2023.

== Honours ==
Kauno Žalgiris

- Toplyga: 2025, 2026
- Lithuanian Cup: 2026
- Lithuanian Supercup: 2026
