= Tom Lebeau =

French footballer (born 1998)

Personal information
- Date of birth: 23 July 1998 (age 28)
- Place of birth: Niort, France
- Height: 1.74 m (5 ft 9 in)
- Position: Midfielder

Team information
- Current team: Saint-Malo
- Number: 8

Senior career*
Years	Team	Apps	(Gls)
2016–2023	Niort B	60	(0)
2016–2023	Niort	49	(0)
2019–2020	→ Laval (loan)	12	(2)
2019–2020	→ Laval B (loan)	8	(3)
2022–2023	→ Concarneau (loan)	32	(1)
2023–2024	Concarneau	8	(1)
2024–2025	Le Puy	19	(1)
2025–	Saint-Malo	7	(0)
- * Club domestic league appearances and goals as of 4 December 2025

Tom Lebeau (born 23 July 1998) is a French professional footballer who plays as a midfielder for Championnat National 1 club Saint-Malo.

== Career ==
Lebeau made his Ligue 2 debut on 28 April 2017, coming on as a substitute for Quentin Daubin in the 0–3 defeat to Stade de Reims. On 12 June 2019 he joined Stade Lavallois on loan for the duration of the 2019–20 season.

On 7 June 2022, Lebeau joined Concarneau on loan for the 2022–23 season.

== Career statistics ==
As of matches played 1 February 2022.

Appearances and goals by club, season and competition
Club	Season	League			Cup		League Cup		Other		Total	
Club	Season	Division	Apps	Goals	Apps	Goals	Apps	Goals	Apps	Goals	Apps	Goals
Chamois Niortais	2016–17	Ligue 2	1	0	0	0	0	0	—		1	0
Chamois Niortais	2017–18	Ligue 2	11	0	1	0	0	0	—		12	0
Chamois Niortais	2018–19	Ligue 2	18	0	1	0	1	0	—		20	0
Chamois Niortais	2020–21	Ligue 2	10	0	0	0	— (Note: The Coupe de la Ligue was indefinitely suspended following the 2019–20 edition)		1 (Note: Matches played in the 2020–21 Ligue 2 relegation playoffs)	1	11	1
Chamois Niortais	2021–22	Ligue 2	9	0	— (Note: Niort excluded from the 2021–22 Coupe de France)		—		—		9	0
Chamois Niortais	Total		49	0	2	0	1	0	1	1	53	1
Laval (loan)	2019–20	National	12	2	1	0	0	0	—		13	2
Career total			61	2	3	0	1	0	1	1	66	3

== Honours ==
Concarneau

- Championnat National: 2022–23

Le Puy

- Championnat National 2: 2024–25
