= Louis Ameka =

Gabonese footballer

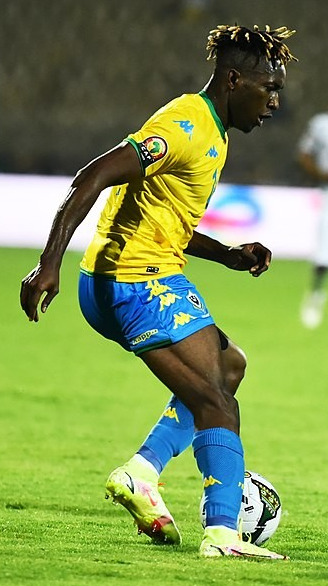

Personal information
- Full name: Louis Ameka Autchanga
- Date of birth: 3 October 1996 (age 30)
- Place of birth: Libreville, Gabon
- Position: Midfielder

Team information
- Current team: TP Mazembe
- Number: 38

Senior career*
Years	Team	Apps	(Gls)
2015–2018	CF Mounana		
2018–2021	Chamois Niortais	51	(2)
2018–2021	Chamois Niortais II	13	(4)
2021–2023	Maghreb de Fès	37	(3)
2023–	TP Mazembe		

International career^{‡}
- Gabon U17
2015	Gabon U23		
2017–	Gabon	27	(0)
- * Club domestic league appearances and goals as of 11:56, 25 August 2023 (UTC) ‡ National team caps and goals as of 11:56, 25 August 2023 (UTC)

Louis Ameka Autchanga (born 3 October 1996) is a Gabonese professional footballer who plays for TP Mazembe and the Gabon national team as an attacking midfielder.

== Club career ==
He has played club football for CF Mounana, Chamois Niortais and Maghreb de Fès. In August 2023 he signed for TP Mazembe.

== International career ==
He made his international debut for Gabon in 2017. At the youth level he played in the 2013 African U-17 Championship qualifiers, scoring against Benin, and then the 2015 Africa U-23 Cup of Nations qualifiers.
