= Gabin Delguel =

French footballer (born 2001)

Personal information
- Date of birth: 20 January 2001 (age 25)
- Place of birth: Rochefort, France
- Height: 1.76 m (5 ft 9 in)
- Position: Leftback

Team information
- Current team: FC Chauray
- Number: 18

Senior career*
Years	Team	Apps	(Gls)
2019–2021	Niort II	15	(1)
2020–2021	Niort	2	(0)
2021–2022	Bergerac	0	(0)
2022–2023	La Rochelle		
2023–2025	Raon-l'Étape	29	(1)
2025–	FC Chauray	0	(0)
- * Club domestic league appearances and goals as of 17 May 2025

Gabin Delguel (born 20 January 2001) is a French professional footballer who plays as a leftback for Championnat National 1 club FC Chauray.

== Professional career ==
Delguel made his professional debut for Niort in a 2–2 draw with Paris FC on 26 September 2020. He made a second Ligue 2 appearance later the same season, coming on as a substitute for Bilal Boutobba in the 2–1 win against Pau on 20 February 2021. Delguel signed for Championnat National 2 club Bergerac ahead of the 2021–22 season.
