= Emyl Leclercq =

Singaporean footballer

Personal information
- Date of birth: 6 December 2002 (age 23)
- Place of birth: Singapore
- Height: 1.88 m (6 ft 2 in)
- Position: Goalkeeper

Youth career
- 2009–2017: La Brède F.C
- 2017–2020: Chamois Niortais

Senior career*
Years	Team	Apps	(Gls)
2020–2021	Chamois Niortais II	2	(0)
2020–2021	Chamois Niortais	1	(0)
2021–2022	Cholet	0	(0)
- * Club domestic league appearances and goals as of 13 May 2022

Emyl Leclercq (born 6 December 2002) is a French professional footballer who plays as a goalkeeper. He was born in Singapore to a French father and a Singaporean mother of Malay descent.

== Career ==
A youth product of La Brède FC, Leclercq joined the youth academy of Chamois Niortais in 2017. He debuted for Chamois Niortais in a 2–0 Ligue 2 loss to LB Châteauroux on 3 October 2020. He signed for Championnat National club SO Cholet on 2 June 2021.
