= Pape Ibnou Ba =

Footballer (born 1993)

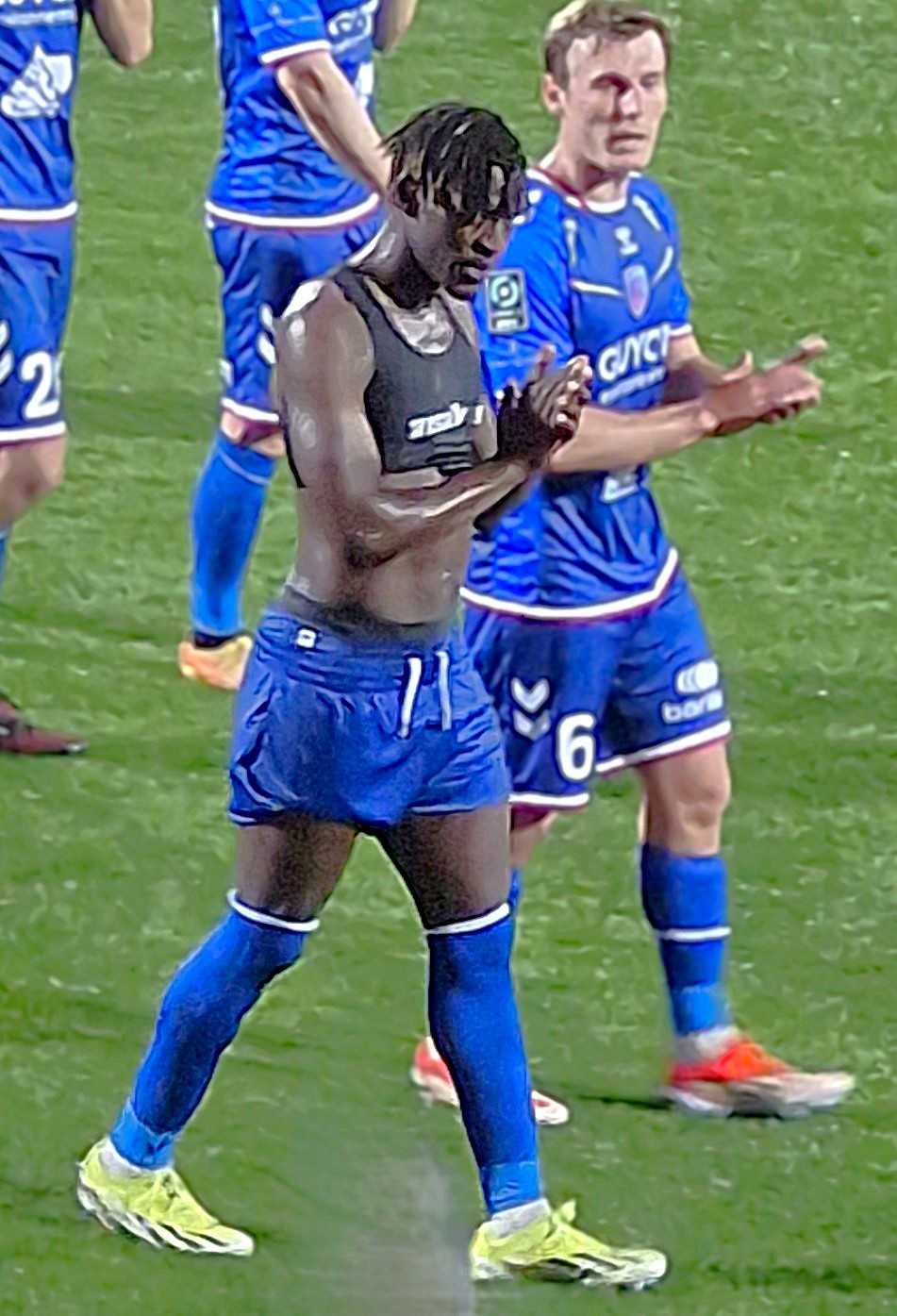
- Ba in 2024

Personal information
- Date of birth: 5 January 1993 (age 33)
- Place of birth: Saint-Louis, Senegal
- Height: 1.74 m (5 ft 9 in)
- Position: Forward

Senior career*
Years	Team	Apps	(Gls)
2013–2016	Linguère		
2016–2017	Stade de Mbour		
2017	→ Al Ahed (loan)	5	(3)
2017–2020	Athlético Marseille	58	(48)
2020–2021	Niort	41	(14)
2021–2024	Le Havre	26	(3)
2022–2023	→ Pau (loan)	8	(1)
2022–2023	→ Pau B (loan)	1	(0)
2023–2024	→ Concarneau (loan)	15	(5)
2024	Concarneau	16	(7)
2024–2025	Troyes	20	(2)
2025–2026	Orléans	12	(2)

International career^{‡}
2021–	Mauritania	26	(2)
- * Club domestic league appearances and goals as of 23 June 2026 ‡ National team caps and goals as of 1 April 2025

Pape Ibnou Ba (born 5 January 1993) is a professional footballer who plays as a forward. Born in Senegal, he plays for the Mauritania national team.

== Club career ==
Ba is a youth product of his local club Linguère, and was the record top scorer in a single Senegal Premier League, with 17 goals in the 2015–16 season.

On 3 January 2017, Ba signed for Lebanese Premier League side Ahed, scoring three goals in five matches.

On 29 June 2020, Ba signed with Niort after a prolific stint with Athlético Marseille in the amateur leagues of France. He made his professional debut with Niort in 1–0 Ligue 2 win over En Avant Guingamp on 22 August 2020, scoring his side's only goal of the game.

On 1 September, Ba joins Pau on a one season loan deal.

== International career ==
Born in Senegal, Ba is of Mauritanian descent. He was called up to represent the Mauritania national team for the 2021 Africa Cup of Nations. He debuted for the team in a 0–0 friendly tie with Burkina Faso on 30 December 2021.

== Honours ==
Al Ahed

- Lebanese Premier League: 2016–17
