= Valentin Jacob =

French footballer (born 1994)

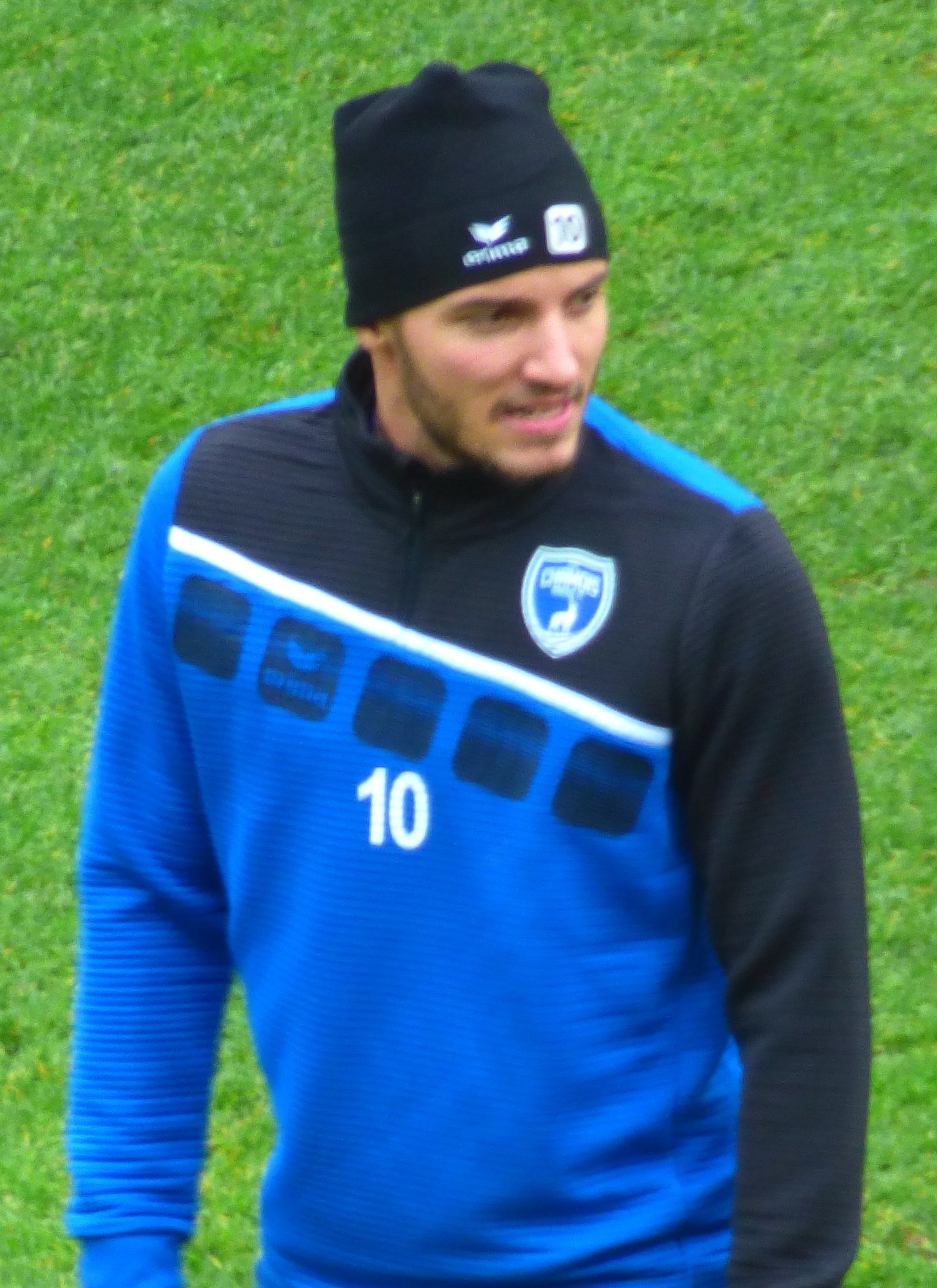
- Jacob with Niort in 2019

Personal information
- Date of birth: 15 June 1994 (age 32)
- Place of birth: Paris, France
- Height: 1.69 m (5 ft 7 in)
- Position: Midfielder

Team information
- Current team: Rumilly-Vallières

Senior career*
Years	Team	Apps	(Gls)
2012–2013	Sedan II	12	(0)
2013–2016	Auxerre II	65	(14)
2016–2018	Annecy	47	(21)
2018–2021	Niort	86	(11)
2018	Niort II	1	(0)
2021–2023	Dijon	55	(3)
2023–2025	Ajaccio	34	(3)
2026	Annecy	13	(1)
2026–	Rumilly-Vallières	0	(0)
- * Club domestic league appearances and goals as of 11 May 2026

Valentin Jacob (born 15 June 1994) is a French professional footballer who plays as a midfielder for Championnat National 1 club Rumilly-Vallières.

== Career ==
On 6 June 2018, Jacob signed with Chamois Niortais for three seasons, after scoring 15 goals in 28 matches with Annecy. He made his professional debut for Niort in a 2–1 Ligue 2 win over Red Star on 27 July 2018.

On 25 May 2021, Jacob joined Ligue 2 side Dijon on a three-year deal.

On 1 January 2026, Jacob returned to Annecy.
