= 2020–21 Ligue 2 =

82nd season of the second-tier football league in France

Ligue 2
- Season: 2020–21
- Dates: 22 August 2020 – 15 May 2021
- Champions: Troyes
- Promoted: Troyes; Clermont
- Relegated: Châteauroux; Chambly
- Matches played: 380
- Goals scored: 910 (2.39 per match)

The 2020–21 Ligue 2 season, also known as Ligue 2 BKT for sponsorship reasons, was the 82nd season of second-division football in France, and the 19th season since the division was rebranded as Ligue 2 from Division 2. Due to the uncertainty caused by the COVID-19 pandemic, the announcement of the start and end dates for the season was delayed. There were suggestions that the season would feature just 18 teams, as opposed to the usual 20, after France's highest administrative court overturned the relegations of Amiens and Toulouse from Ligue 1; however, the relegations were reinstated by the General Assembly of the LFP with a vote on 23 June 2020. The league fixtures were announced on 9 July 2020 and the league season began on 22 August 2020 and ended on 15 May 2021.

== Teams ==
=== Team changes ===
▲ from Championnat National	▲ to Ligue 1	▼ from Ligue 1	▼ to Championnat National
Pau; Dunkerque	Lorient; Lens	Amiens; Toulouse	Orléans; Le Mans

=== Stadia and locations ===
Location of teams in 2020–21 Ligue 2

Club	Location	Venue	Capacity
Ajaccio	Ajaccio	Stade François Coty	10,446
Amiens	Amiens	Stade de la Licorne	12,097
Auxerre	Auxerre	Stade de l'Abbé-Deschamps	21,379
Caen	Caen	Stade Michel d'Ornano	21,215
Chambly	Beauvais	Stade Pierre Brisson	10,178
Châteauroux	Châteauroux	Stade Gaston Petit	17,173
Clermont Foot	Clermont-Ferrand	Stade Gabriel Montpied	11,980
Dunkerque	Dunkirk	Stade Marcel-Tribut	4,200
Grenoble	Grenoble	Stade des Alpes	20,068
Guingamp	Guingamp	Stade de Roudourou	18,378
Le Havre	Le Havre	Stade Océane	25,178
Nancy	Tomblaine	Stade Marcel Picot	20,087
Niort	Niort	Stade René Gaillard	10,886
Paris FC	Paris (13th arrondissement)	Stade Charléty	20,000
Pau	Pau	Nouste Camp	13,819
Rodez	Rodez	Stade Paul-Lignon	5,955
Sochaux	Montbéliard	Stade Auguste Bonal	20,005
Toulouse	Toulouse	Stadium Municipal	33,150
Troyes	Troyes	Stade de l'Aube	21,684
Valenciennes	Valenciennes	Stade du Hainaut	25,172

=== Personnel and kits ===
Team	Manager	Captain	Kit manufacturer	Main sponsor
Ajaccio	(France) Olivier Pantaloni	(Guadeloupe) Cédric Avinel	Adidas	Auchan Atrium
Amiens	(France) Oswald Tanchot	(France) Prince-Désir Gouano	Puma	Intersport
Auxerre	(France) Jean-Marc Furlan	(Mali) Birama Touré	Macron	Remorques LOUALT
Caen	(France) Stéphane Moulin	(France) Jonathan Rivierez	Umbro	Maisons France Confort (H), Campagne de France (A & 3)
Châteauroux	(Italy) Marco Simone	(Cameroon) Yannick M'Boné	Nike	Monin
Chambly	(France) Bruno Luzi	(France) Thibault Jaques	Umbro	Flint
Clermont	(France) Pascal Gastien	(Uruguay) Jonathan Iglesias	Patrick	Crédit Mutuel
Dunkerque	(France) Fabien Mercadal	(France) Axel Maraval	Kappa	Intersport
Grenoble	(France) Philippe Hinschberger	(France) Brice Maubleu	Nike	Carrefour, Sempa, BONTAZ
Guingamp	(France) Frédéric Bompard	(Comoros) Youssouf M'Changama	Umbro	Servagroupe (H), Aroma Celte (A)
Le Havre	(France) Paul Le Guen	(France) Alexandre Bonnet	Joma	Filiassur, SEAFRIGO Group
Nancy	(France) Jean-Louis Garcia	(Guinea) Ernest Seka	Puma	Lor Port
Niort	(France) Sébastien Desabre	(France) Dylan Louiserre	Erima	Restaurant Le Billon (H), Cheminées Poujoulat (A)
Paris FC	(France) René Girard	(France) Vincent Demarconnay	Nike	Vinci
Pau	(France) Didier Tholot	(France) Antoine Batisse	Adidas	Iroise Bellevie
Rodez	(France) Laurent Peyrelade	(France) Pierre Bardy	Adidas	Max Outil
Sochaux	(Senegal) Omar Daf	(France) Gaëtan Weissbeck	Nike	Nedey Automobiles
Toulouse	(France) Patrice Garande	(Norway) Ruben Gabrielsen	Joma	Triangle Interim
Troyes	(France) Laurent Batlles	(France) Jimmy Giraudon	Le Coq Sportif	Babeau Seguin
Valenciennes	(France) Olivier Guégan	(France) Laurent Dos Santos	Acerbis	Mutuelle Just

=== Managerial changes ===
Team	Outgoing manager	Manner of departure	Date of vacancy	Position in table	Incoming manager	Date of appointment
Niort	(France) Franck Passi	End of contract	6 June 2020	Pre-season	(France) Sébastien Desabre	16 June 2020
Toulouse	(France) Denis Zanko	End of interim	22 June 2020	Pre-season	(France) Patrice Garande	22 June 2020
Guingamp	(France) Sylvain Didot	Sacked	30 August 2020	15th	(Bosnia and Herzegovina) Mehmed Baždarević	30 August 2020
Amiens	(Slovenia) Luka Elsner	Sacked	28 September 2020	15th	(France) Oswald Tanchot	16 October 2020
Châteauroux	(France) Nicolas Usaï	Sacked	13 December 2020	18th	(France) Benoît Cauet	1 January 2021
Guingamp	(Bosnia and Herzegovina) Mehmed Baždarević	Mutual consent	1 February 2021	17th	(France) Frédéric Bompard	1 February 2021
Châteauroux	(France) Benoît Cauet	Sacked	10 March 2021	20th	(Italy) Marco Simone	10 March 2021
Caen	(France) Pascal Dupraz	Sacked	23 March 2021	14th	(France) Fabrice Vandeputte	23 March 2021

== League table ==
Pos	Team	Pld	W	D	L	GF	GA	GD	Pts	Promotion or Relegation
1	Troyes (C, P)	38	23	8	7	60	36	+24	77	Promotion to Ligue 1
2	Clermont (P)	38	21	9	8	61	25	+36	72	Promotion to Ligue 1
3	Toulouse	38	20	10	8	71	42	+29	70	Qualification to promotion play-offs
4	Grenoble	38	18	11	9	51	35	+16	65	Qualification to promotion play-offs
5	Paris FC	38	17	13	8	53	37	+16	64	Qualification to promotion play-offs
6	Auxerre	38	16	14	8	64	43	+21	62	
7	Sochaux	38	12	15	11	45	37	+8	51	
8	Nancy	38	11	14	13	53	53	0	47	
9	Guingamp	38	10	17	11	41	43	−2	47	
10	Amiens	38	11	14	13	34	40	−6	47	
11	Valenciennes	38	12	11	15	50	59	−9	47	
12	Le Havre	38	11	14	13	38	48	−10	47	
13	Ajaccio	38	11	13	14	34	43	−9	46	
14	Pau	38	11	11	16	42	49	−7	44	
15	Rodez	38	8	19	11	38	44	−6	43	
16	Dunkerque	38	10	11	17	34	47	−13	41	
17	Caen	38	9	14	15	34	49	−15	41	
18	Niort (O)	38	9	14	15	34	58	−24	41	Qualification for the relegation play-offs
19	Chambly (R)	38	9	11	18	41	64	−23	38	Relegation to Championnat National
20	Châteauroux (R)	38	4	11	23	32	58	−26	23	Relegation to Championnat National

Source: Ligue 2
Rules for classification: 1) Points; 2) Goal difference; 3) Number of goals scored; 4) Head-to-head goal difference; 5) Fair play points
(C) Champions; (O) Play-off winners; (P) Promoted; (R) Relegated

== Results ==
Home \ Away	AJA	AMI	AUX	CAE	FCC	CHA	CLE	DUN	GRE	GUI	HAC	NAN	NIO	PFC	PAU	ROD	SOC	TFC	TRO	VAL
Ajaccio	—	2–2	0–0	1–0	0–0	0–1	0–2	1–0	2–1	0–2	1–1	1–0	3–0	1–1	4–1	1–0	1–1	0–1	0–4	3–0
Amiens	0–0	—	1–1	0–0	1–1	1–0	1–1	1–0	1–0	0–3	0–0	1–0	0–0	1–2	0–0	1–0	0–1	0–1	3–1	3–1
Auxerre	5–1	2–1	—	1–1	4–0	4–1	0–1	2–1	1–1	1–1	1–1	3–2	6–0	0–0	2–1	0–1	0–2	3–1	2–1	1–1
Caen	1–0	1–0	0–0	—	0–0	1–1	2–1	1–1	1–1	1–0	0–2	2–1	1–0	0–2	1–1	1–2	1–4	2–2	0–0	1–1
Chambly	2–1	2–0	0–1	4–2	—	2–1	0–3	0–1	1–2	3–0	0–1	1–1	1–1	0–3	1–0	1–0	1–4	1–1	0–3	1–2
Châteauroux	0–0	0–0	1–2	2–2	4–0	—	0–1	1–2	0–1	2–3	0–1	1–4	2–0	1–2	0–3	1–1	2–1	0–3	1–2	3–3
Clermont	0–2	3–0	1–0	0–0	1–0	2–1	—	5–0	3–0	0–0	1–1	2–0	0–0	3–2	3–0	3–0	3–1	1–1	2–1	4–0
Dunkerque	3–1	1–1	0–1	2–3	1–1	2–0	1–1	—	1–1	1–0	0–1	1–2	2–0	0–1	2–2	0–0	1–0	3–3	0–0	1–0
Grenoble	2–0	0–0	2–2	3–1	2–0	2–2	1–2	4–0	—	2–1	2–1	1–0	1–1	0–0	1–1	1–0	2–0	5–3	2–0	2–0
Guingamp	2–2	2–2	2–0	2–2	1–0	2–0	0–5	0–0	1–0	—	1–3	0–0	0–1	0–0	2–3	1–1	0–0	1–1	1–2	1–1
Le Havre	1–1	1–0	1–1	1–2	2–4	1–1	0–0	1–1	0–2	1–1	—	1–1	0–1	1–0	1–0	1–1	0–2	0–1	3–2	0–2
Nancy	2–0	2–2	2–2	1–0	3–3	2–1	1–0	2–1	1–2	2–2	0–1	—	2–2	1–1	1–0	2–2	0–0	1–3	2–3	1–3
Niort	2–0	0–2	0–4	3–0	1–1	1–1	1–0	1–2	0–0	0–2	0–0	1–0	—	2–2	2–1	1–1	1–3	1–0	0–3	0–3
Paris FC	1–1	4–2	0–3	3–1	3–0	1–0	0–1	1–0	2–0	3–2	3–0	0–2	3–3	—	1–0	1–1	0–0	3–1	1–1	1–0
Pau	0–0	2–0	3–0	1–0	1–3	1–0	2–1	3–1	0–2	0–1	2–0	1–1	4–1	1–1	—	1–1	0–0	0–3	0–1	4–3
Rodez	0–1	1–2	2–2	0–3	2–2	1–1	2–0	2–1	1–0	1–1	1–1	1–1	1–1	2–2	1–0	—	1–1	1–0	0–1	3–0
Sochaux	0–2	0–2	2–3	1–0	3–2	0–0	0–0	1–0	1–1	0–0	4–0	1–1	3–4	1–2	1–1	2–2	—	0–1	2–1	2–0
Toulouse	3–0	3–0	3–1	3–0	4–0	1–0	3–2	0–1	2–0	2–2	4–3	4–1	2–1	1–0	2–2	3–0	0–0	—	0–0	4–5
Troyes	1–0	2–1	3–1	1–0	2–2	2–0	1–0	2–0	3–1	1–0	2–0	1–5	1–0	2–1	2–0	2–1	2–1	1–1	—	1–1
Valenciennes	1–1	0–2	2–2	1–0	2–1	1–0	1–3	1–0	0–1	0–1	3–5	2–3	1–1	2–0	3–0	1–1	0–0	1–0	2–2	—

Source: Ligue 2
Legend: Blue = home team win; Yellow = draw; Red = away team win.

== Promotion play-offs ==
A promotion play-off competition was held at the end of the season, involving the 3rd, 4th and 5th-placed teams in 2020–21 Ligue 2, and the 18th-placed team in 2020–21 Ligue 1.

The quarter-final was played on 18 May and the semi-final was played on 21 May.

Quarter-final
4B	Grenoble	2
5B	Paris FC	0

Semi-final
3B	Toulouse	3
4B	Grenoble	0

Final
3B	Toulouse	1	1	2
18A	Nantes	2	0	2(a)

Round 1

18 May 2021
20:45 CEST

Grenoble	2–0	Paris
Anani 8'; Semedo 87'	Report

Stade des Alpes, Grenoble
Attendance: 0 (Behind closed doors)
Referee: Bastien Depechy

Round 2

21 May 2021
20:45 CEST

Toulouse	3–0	Grenoble
Spierings 3'; Koné 23'; Healey 90+2'	Report

Stadium de Toulouse, Toulouse
Attendance: 0 (Behind closed doors)
Referee: Amaury Delerue

Promotion Play-offs '1st leg'

27 May 2021
20:45 CEST

Toulouse	1–2	Nantes
Machado 19'	Report	Blas 10'; Kolo Muani 22'

Stadium de Toulouse, Toulouse
Attendance: 0 (Behind closed doors)
Referee: Jérémie Pignard

'2nd leg'

30 May 2021
18:00 CEST

Nantes	0–1	Toulouse
	Report	Bayo 62'

La Beaujoire-Louis Fonteneau, Nantes
Attendance: 0 (Behind closed doors)
Referee: Benoît Bastien

2–2 on aggregate. Nantes won on away goals and therefore both clubs remained in their respective leagues.

== Relegation play-offs ==
A relegation play-off was held at the end of the season between the 18th-placed team of the 2020–21 Ligue 2 and the 3rd-placed team of the 2020–21 Championnat National. This was played over two legs on 19 and 22 May.

19 May 2021
19:00 CEST

Villefranche	3–1	Niort
Blanc 54'; Dauchy 84'; Garita 90+3'	Report	Bâ 45+2'

Stade Armand Chouffet, Villefranche-sur-Saône
Attendance: 0
Referee: Bartolomeu Varela Teles

22 May 2021
20:45 CEST

Niort	2–0	Villefranche
Lebeau 78'; Kemen 81'	Report

Stade René Gaillard, Niort
Attendance: 0
Referee: Nicolas Rainville

3–3 on aggregate. Niort won on away goals and therefore both clubs remained in their respective leagues.

== Top scorers ==
Rank	Player	Club	Goals
1	(Guinea) Mohamed Bayo	Clermont	22
2	(France) Mickaël Le Bihan	Auxerre	19
3	(Tunisia) Yoann Touzghar	Troyes	16
4	(Senegal) Pape Ibnou Bâ	Niort	14
4	(France) Rémy Dugimont	Auxerre	14
4	(England) Rhys Healey	Toulouse	14
7	(Gabon) Jim Allevinah	Clermont	12
7	(Martinique) Mickaël Biron	Nancy	12
7	(Benin) Jodel Dossou	Clermont	12
10	(Belgium) Baptiste Guillaume	Valenciennes	11
