= 2019–20 FC Nantes season =

Nantes
2019–20 season
- President: Waldemar Kita
- Head coach: Christian Gourcuff
- Stadium: La Beaujoire-Louis; Fonteneau
- Ligue 1: 13th
- Coupe de France: Round of 32
- Coupe de la Ligue: Round of 16
- Top goalscorer: League: Ludovic Blas; Moses Simon (5 each); All: Moses Simon (9)
- Highest home attendance: 34,832 (vs Marseille, 17 August 2019)
- Lowest home attendance: 13,751 (vs Toulouse, 1 December 2019)
- Average home league attendance: 24,187
- Biggest win: All: Nantes 8–0 Paris FC (30 October 2019, CdlL); League: +2 goals (twice); Saint-Étienne 0–2 Nantes (12 January 2020); Marseille 1–3 Nantes (22 February 2020)
Home colours	Away colours	Third colours

The 2019–20 season was Football Club de Nantes's 76th season in existence and the club's 7th consecutive season in the top flight of French football. In addition to the domestic league, Nantes participated in this season's editions of the Coupe de France, and the Coupe de la Ligue. The season covered the period from 1 July 2019 to 30 June 2020.

== Players ==
=== First-team squad ===
As of 19 January 2020

Note: Flags indicate national team as defined under FIFA eligibility rules; some limited exceptions apply. Players may hold more than one non-FIFA nationality.

No.	Pos.	Nation	Player
1	GK	FRA	Alban Lafont (on loan from Fiorentina)
2	DF	BRA	Fábio
3	DF	FRA	Wesley Moustache
4	DF	FRA	Nicolas Pallois (vice-captain)
6	MF	FRA	Roli Pereira de Sa
7	FW	MLI	Kalifa Coulibaly
8	FW	FRA	Marcus Coco
10	MF	PER	Cristian Benavente (on loan from Pyramids FC)
11	MF	ALG	Mehdi Abeid
12	DF	FRA	Dennis Appiah
13	DF	MLI	Molla Wagué

No.	Pos.	Nation	Player
14	DF	MLI	Charles Traoré
15	FW	BEL	Anthony Limbombe
16	GK	FRA	Alexandre Olliero
17	MF	FRA	Ludovic Blas
18	MF	COD	Samuel Moutoussamy
19	MF	FRA	Abdoulaye Touré (captain)
20	DF	BRA	Andrei Girotto
21	MF	SLO	Rene Krhin
22	FW	FRA	Bridge Ndilu
23	DF	FRA	Thomas Basila
24	FW	FRA	Élie Youan
25	DF	TOG	Josué Homawoo
26	MF	FRA	Imran Louza
27	MF	NGR	Moses Simon (on loan from Levante)
28	FW	BEL	Renaud Emond
30	GK	SLO	Denis Petric
32	FW	FRA	Kader Bamba

=== Out on loan ===
Note: Flags indicate national team as defined under FIFA eligibility rules; some limited exceptions apply. Players may hold more than one non-FIFA nationality.

No.	Pos.	Nation	Player
—	GK	FRA	Quentin Braat (at Niort until 30 June 2020)
—	GK	FRA	Maxime Dupé (at Clermont Foot until 30 June 2020)

No.	Pos.	Nation	Player
—	MF	FRA	Abou Ba (at Aris until 30 June 2020)
—	MF	BRA	Lucas Evangelista (at Vitoria SC until 30 June 2020)
—	FW	COD	Randal Kolo (at Boulogne until 30 June 2020)

=== Reserve squad ===
As of 1 January 2020

Note: Flags indicate national team as defined under FIFA eligibility rules; some limited exceptions apply. Players may hold more than one non-FIFA nationality.

No.	Pos.	Nation	Player
—	GK	FRA	Nassim Badri
—	GK	BIH	Adem Husejnovic
—	GK	FRA	Charly Jan
—	GK	FRA	Anthony Robin
—	DF	FRA	Victor Daguin
—	DF	FRA	Nathan Gassama
—	DF	FRA	Aristote Lusinga
—	DF	FRA	Ryan Sabry
—	DF	FRA	Abdoulaye Sylla
—	DF	FRA	Sekou Traore
—	DF	COD	Anthony Walongwa
—	MF	FRA	Teddy Bouriaud
—	MF	FRA	Theo Chendri

No.	Pos.	Nation	Player
—	MF	FRA	Abdoulaye Dabo
—	MF	GEQ	Santiago Eneme-Bocari
—	MF	CMR	James Eto'o-Eyenga
—	MF	FRA	Alexis Mané
—	MF	FRA	Bryan Mavinzi
—	MF	FRA	Batista Mendy
33	MF	PER	Percy Prado
—	MF	FRA	Mathis Thévenin
—	FW	FRA	Hakim Abdallah
—	FW	MLI	Amadou Coulibaly
—	FW	FRA	Taylor Luvambo
—	FW	FRA	Akram Tsague

== Pre-season and friendlies ==
Win Draw Loss

8 July 2019 Friendly	Stade Nyonnais	0–1	Nantes	Nyon, Switzerland
19:00 CEST (UTC+2)		Report	Lima 84'	Stadium: Colovray Sports Centre; Attendance: 250

12 July 2019 Friendly	Stade Lausanne-Ouchy	0–1	Nantes	Nyon, Switzerland
18:00 CEST (UTC+2)				Stadium: Juan-Antonio-Samaranch Stadium

19 July 2019 Friendly	Nantes	3–2	Niort	Luçon, France
18:30 CEST (UTC+2)	Basila 8'; Bamba 21'; Touré 62' (pen.)	Report	Louiserre 55' (pen.); Passi 79'	Stadium: Stade Jean de Mouzon

26 July 2019 Friendly	Brest	1–0	Nantes	Inzinzac-Lochrist, France
19:00 CEST (UTC+2)	N'Goma 32'	Report		Stadium: Stade de Mané-Braz; Attendance: 1,000; Referee: Amaury Delerue (France)

30 July 2019 Friendly	Nantes	2–0	Sporting Gijón	La Baule-Escoublac, France
19:00 CEST (UTC+2)	Touré 19' (pen.); Louza 76'	Report		Stadium: Stade Moreau-Defarges; Referee: Hakim Ben El Hadj (France)

2 August 2019 Friendly	Nantes	1–1	Genoa	Nantes, France
19:00 CEST (UTC+2)	Homawoo (yellow card) 66'; Lima 84'; Kolo (yellow card) 85'	Report	Lerager 28'; Cassata (yellow card) 68'; El Yamiq (yellow card) 80'; Romero (yellow card) 82'	Stadium: Stade de la Beaujoire; Referee: Jérémy Stinat (France)

5 September 2019 Friendly	Caen	1–0	Nantes	Caen, France
17:00 CEST (UTC+2)	Tell 37'	Report		Stadium: Stade Michel d'Ornano

== Competitions ==
Win Draw Loss Fixtures

=== Overview ===
Competition	First match	Last match	Starting round	Final position	Record							
Competition	First match	Last match	Starting round	Final position	Pld	W	D	L	GF	GA	GD	Win %
Ligue 1	10 August 2019	7 March 2020	Matchday 1	13th	28	11	4	13	28	31	−3	39.29
Coupe de France	4 January 2020	18 January 2020	Round of 64	Round of 32	2	1	0	1	5	4	+1	50.00
Coupe de la Ligue	30 October 2019	18 December 2019	Round of 32	Round of 16	2	1	0	1	8	1	+7	50.00
Total					32	13	4	15	41	36	+5	40.63

Source: Soccerway

=== Ligue 1 ===
==== League table ====
Pos	Team	Pld	W	D	L	GF	GA	GD	Pts	PPG
11	Angers	28	11	6	11	28	33	−5	39	1.39
12	Bordeaux	28	9	10	9	40	34	+6	37 (Note: Bordeaux finished ahead of Nantes on head-to-head points: Bordeaux 2–0 Nantes, Nantes 0–1 Bordeaux.)	1.32
13	Nantes	28	11	4	13	28	31	−3	37	1.32
14	Brest	28	8	10	10	34	37	−3	34	1.21
15	Metz	28	8	10	10	27	35	−8	34	1.21

Source: Ligue 1
Rules for classification: 1) Points per game; 2) Head-to-head points; 3) Head-to-head goal difference; 4) Goal difference; 5) Goals scored; 6) Fairplay ranking.

==== Results summary ====
Overall								Home						Away					
Pld	W	D	L	GF	GA	GD	Pts	W	D	L	GF	GA	GD	W	D	L	GF	GA	GD
28	11	4	13	28	31	−3	37	6	2	6	11	11	0	5	2	7	17	20	−3

Source: Ligue 1

==== Results by round ====
Round	1	2	3	4	5	6	7	8	9	10	11	12	13	14	15	16	17	18	19	20	21	22	23	24	25	26	27	28	29	30	31	32	33	34	35	36	37	38
Ground	A	H	A	H	H	A	H	A	H	A	H	A	H	A	H	A	H	A	H	A	H	A	H	A	H	A	H	A	H	A	A	H	A	H	A	H	A	H
Result	L	D	W	W	W	L	W	W	W	L	L	L	L	D	W	L	W	W	L	W	L	L	L	D	D	W	L	L	C	C	C	C	C	C	C	C	C	C
Position	13	14	11	7	3	7	4	3	2	2	2	3	9	8	6	9	6	5	5	4	6	9	11	12	12	11	11	13	13	13	13	13	13	13	13	13	13	13

Source: Ligue 1
A = Away; H = Home; W = Win; D = Draw; L = Loss; C = Cancelled

==== Matches ====
The Ligue 1 schedule was announced on 14 June 2019. The Ligue 1 matches were suspended by the LFP on 13 March 2020 due to COVID-19 until further notices. On 28 April 2020, it was announced that Ligue 1 and Ligue 2 campaigns would not resume, after the country banned all sporting events until September. On 30 April, The LFP ended officially the 2019–20 season.

11 August 2019 1	Lille	2–1	Nantes	Villeneuve-d'Ascq
15:00 CEST (UTC+2)	Osimhen 19', 80'; Bamba (yellow card) 49'; Weah (yellow card) 65'	Report	Fábio (yellow card) 43'; Traoré (yellow card) 45+3'; Çelik 51' (o.g.); Wagué (yellow card) 77'; Pallois (yellow card) 90+4'	Stadium: Stade Pierre-Mauroy; Attendance: 34,494; Referee: Mikael Lesage

17 August 2019 2	Nantes	0–0	Marseille	Nantes
17:30 CEST (UTC+2)		Report	Sanson (yellow card) 42'; Kamara (yellow card) 48'; Strootman (yellow card) 87'	Stadium: Stade de la Beaujoire; Attendance: 34,832; Referee: Benoît Bastien

24 August 2019 3	Amiens	1–2	Nantes	Amiens
20:00 CEST (UTC+2)	Aleesami (yellow card) 16'; Dibassy (red card) 51'; Lafont 71' (o.g.)	Report	Touré (yellow card) 45+2'; Coulibaly 53'; Simon 84'	Stadium: Stade de la Licorne; Attendance: 11,393; Referee: Jérémy Stinat

31 August 2019 4	Nantes	1–0	Montpellier	Nantes
20:00 CEST (UTC+2)	Bamba (yellow card) 33'; Abeid (yellow card) 71'; Touré 85'	Report	Mendes (yellow card) 28'; Laborde (yellow card) 45+1'	Stadium: Stade de la Beaujoire; Attendance: 18,980; Referee: Karim Abed

15 September 2019 5	Nantes	1–0	Reims	Nantes
15:00 CEST (UTC+2)	Pallois (yellow card) 47'; Coulibaly 69'	Report	Kamara (yellow card) 67'; Romao (yellow card) 78'; Chavalerin (yellow card) 86'	Stadium: Stade de la Beaujoire; Attendance: 18,897; Referee: Willy Delajod

20 September 2019 6	Strasbourg	2–1	Nantes	Strasbourg
20:45 CEST (UTC+2)	Liénard 66'; Koné (yellow card) 82'; Mitrović (yellow card) 83'; Ajorque 89' (pen.)	Report	Coulibaly 28'; Louza (yellow card) 73'; Fábio (yellow card) 88'	Stadium: Stade de la Meinau; Attendance: 24,013; Referee: Florent Batta

25 September 2019 7	Nantes	1–0	Rennes	Nantes
19:00 CEST (UTC+2)	Fábio (yellow card) 22'; Lafont (yellow card) 32'; Touré 77' (pen.)	Report	Lea Siliki (yellow card) 56'; Hunou (yellow card) 59'; Morel (yellow card) 75'; Raphinha (yellow card) 88'	Stadium: Stade de la Beaujoire; Attendance: 26,952; Referee: Antony Gautier

28 September 2019 8	Lyon	0–1	Nantes	Décines-Charpieu
13:30 CEST (UTC+2)	Marcelo (yellow card) 10'; Dubois (yellow card) 55'	Report	Appiah (yellow card) 13'; Marçal 59' (o.g.); Pallois (yellow card) 64'	Stadium: Parc Olympique Lyonnais; Attendance: 46,647; Referee: Benoît Millot

5 October 2019 9	Nantes	1–0	Nice	Nantes
20:00 CEST (UTC+2)	Girotto (yellow card) 76'; Simon 86'	Report	Burner (yellow card) 90+5'; Atal (yellow card) 90+5'	Stadium: Stade de la Beaujoire; Attendance: 23,426; Referee: Amaury Delerue

19 October 2019 10	Metz	1–0	Nantes	Metz
20:00 CEST (UTC+2)	Cabit (yellow card) 49'; Maïga (yellow card) 72'; Diallo 87'	Report	Wagué (red card) 62'; Abeid (yellow card) 72'	Stadium: Stade Saint-Symphorien; Attendance: 16,533; Referee: Jérémie Pignard

25 October 2019 11	Nantes	0–1	Monaco	Nantes
20:45 CEST (UTC+2)	Fábio (yellow card) 10'; Pallois (yellow card) 74'	Report	Ben Yedder 22'; Lecomte (yellow card) 90+2'; Jemerson (yellow card) 90+5'	Stadium: Stade de la Beaujoire; Attendance: 30,656; Referee: Thomas Leonard

3 November 2019 12	Bordeaux	2–0	Nantes	Bordeaux
15:00 CET (UTC+1)	Tchouaméni (yellow card) 6'; Kamano 37'; Mexer (yellow card) 56'; Hwang 57'; De Préville (yellow card) 68'; Jovanović (yellow card) 84'	Report	Pallois (yellow card) 8'; Touré (yellow card) 23'; Girotto (yellow card) 72'	Stadium: Matmut Atlantique; Attendance: 19,545; Referee: François Letexier

10 November 2019 13	Nantes	2–3	Saint-Étienne	Nantes
17:00 CET (UTC+1)	Blas 15'; Louza 26'; Girotto (yellow card) 45'	Report	Trauco 22'; Bouanga 34', 67'	Stadium: Stade de la Beaujoire; Attendance: 34,191; Referee: Clément Turpin

23 November 2019 14	Brest	1–1	Nantes	Brest
20:00 CET (UTC+1)	Bain (yellow card) 18'; Charbonnier (yellow card) 40'; Cardona 68'	Report	Basila (yellow card) 7'; Coulibaly 31'	Stadium: Stade Francis-Le Blé; Attendance: 14,232; Referee: Ruddy Buquet

1 December 2019 15	Nantes	2–1	Toulouse	Nantes
15:00 CET (UTC+1)	Bamba (yellow card) 40'; Touré 43' (pen.); Blas 54'	Report	Koné (yellow card) 8' (yellow-red card) 23'; Isimat-Mirin (yellow card) 48'; Leya Iseka 90+7' (pen.)	Stadium: Stade de la Beaujoire; Attendance: 13,751; Referee: Florent Batta

4 December 2019 16	Paris Saint-Germain	2–0	Nantes	Paris
21:05 CET (UTC+1)	Draxler (yellow card) 34'; Mbappé 52'; Neymar 85' (pen.)	Report	Abeid (yellow card) 29'; Bamba (yellow card) 39'	Stadium: Parc des Princes; Attendance: 47,485; Referee: Amaury Delerue

8 December 2019 17	Nantes	1–0	Dijon	Nantes
17:00 CET (UTC+1)	Pallois (yellow card) 70'; Blas 73'	Report	Balmont (yellow card) 50'; Pereira (yellow card) 57'	Stadium: Stade de la Beaujoire; Attendance: 16,001; Referee: Hakim Ben El Hadj

14 December 2019 18	Nîmes	0–1	Nantes	Nîmes
20:00 CET (UTC+1)		Report	Louza 29'; Bamba (yellow card) 46'; Simon (yellow card) 68'; Pallois (yellow card) 81'	Stadium: Stade des Costières; Attendance: 12,098; Referee: Karim Abed

21 December 2019 19	Nantes	1–2	Angers	Nantes
20:45 CET (UTC+1)	Blas 17'; Pallois (yellow card) 90'	Report	Bobichon 50'; El Melali 87'	Stadium: Stade de la Beaujoire; Attendance: 29,807; Referee: Jérémie Pignard

12 January 2020 20	Saint-Étienne	0–2	Nantes	Saint-Étienne
15:00 CET (UTC+1)	Khazri (yellow card) 52'; Palencia (yellow card) 69'	Report	Abeid 23'; Blas 48'; Louza (yellow card) 70'	Stadium: Stade Geoffroy-Guichard; Attendance: 0 (Note: The match was played behind closed doors due to punishment by the FFF.); Referee: Benoît Bastien

26 January 2020 21	Nantes	0–1	Bordeaux	Nantes
17:00 CET (UTC+1)	Girotto (yellow card) 17' (yellow-red card) 54'; Abeid (yellow card) 31'	Report	De Préville (yellow card) 26'; Otávio (yellow card) 60'; Briand 86'	Stadium: Stade de la Beaujoire; Attendance: 29,839; Referee: Karim Abed

31 January 2020 22	Rennes	3–2	Nantes	Rennes
20:45 CET (UTC+1)	Maouassa (yellow card) 32'; Del Castillo (yellow card) 59'; Raphinha (yellow card) 60', (goal) 71', 90+6'; Bourigeaud 90+4'; Camavinga (yellow card) 90+9'	Report	Appiah (yellow card) 18'; Da Silva 47' (o.g.); Emond (yellow card) 53'; Lafont (yellow card) 60'; Simon 80'; Bamba (yellow card) 90+1'	Stadium: Roazhon Park; Attendance: 27,836; Referee: Benoît Millot

4 February 2020 23	Nantes	1–2	Paris Saint-Germain	Nantes
21:05 CET (UTC+1)	Simon 68'; Traoré (yellow card) 85'	Report	Icardi 29'; Verratti (yellow card) 36'; Kehrer 57'; Meunier (yellow card) 76'; Di María (yellow card) 90'; Kurzawa (yellow card) 90+2'	Stadium: Stade de la Beaujoire; Attendance: 34,307; Referee: Frank Schneider

8 February 2020 24	Dijon	3–3	Nantes	Dijon
20:00 CET (UTC+1)	Mavididi 15', 90'; Tavares 24'; Alphonse (yellow card) 53'; Lautoa (yellow card) 77'	Report	Simon 20'; Alphonse 34' (o.g.); Prado (yellow card) 35'; Louza (yellow card) 71'; Girotto 90+2'	Stadium: Stade Gaston Gérard; Attendance: 11,780; Referee: Jérémie Pignard

15 February 2020 25	Nantes	0–0	Metz	Nantes
20:00 CET (UTC+1)		Report	Udol (yellow card) 57'; Boulaya (red card) 84'	Stadium: Stade de la Beaujoire; Attendance: 20,444; Referee: Jérémy Stinat

22 February 2020 26	Marseille	1–3	Nantes	Marseille
17:30 CET (UTC+1)	Sanson 39'; Amavi (yellow card) 44'	Report	Limbombe 34'; Simon (yellow card) 45+1'; Bamba 53'; Traoré (yellow card) 61'; Girotto (yellow card) 65'; Álvaro 90+1' (o.g.)	Stadium: Stade Vélodrome; Attendance: 60,430; Referee: Jérôme Miguelgorry

1 March 2020 27	Nantes	0–1	Lille	Nantes
15:00 CET (UTC+1)	Lafont (yellow card) 8'; Abeid (yellow card) 32'; Pallois (yellow card) 45+1'; Coulibaly (yellow card) 66'	Report	Ikoné (yellow card) 55'; André 58'; Fonte (yellow card) 68'; Xeka (yellow card) 90+3'	Stadium: Stade de la Beaujoire; Attendance: 20,704; Referee: Willy Delajod

7 March 2020 28	Angers	2–0	Nantes	Angers
20:00 CET (UTC+1)	Bobichon 48'; Thomas 53'	Report	Touré (yellow card) 51'; Pallois (yellow card) 54'; Louza (yellow card) 87'	Stadium: Stade Raymond Kopa; Attendance: 12,132; Referee: Stéphanie Frappart

29	Nantes	Cancelled	Nîmes	Nantes
--:-- CET (UTC+1)				Stadium: Stade de la Beaujoire; Attendance: 0

30	Reims	Cancelled	Nantes	Reims
--:-- CET (UTC+1)				Stadium: Stade Auguste Delaune; Attendance: 0

31	Monaco	Cancelled	Nantes	Monaco
--:-- CEST (UTC+2)				Stadium: Stade Louis II; Attendance: 0

32	Nantes	Cancelled	Lyon	Nantes
--:-- CEST (UTC+2)				Stadium: Stade de la Beaujoire

33	Toulouse	Cancelled	Nantes	Toulouse
--:-- CEST (UTC+2)				Stadium: Stadium de Toulouse

34	Nantes	Cancelled	Amiens	Nantes
--:-- CEST (UTC+2)				Stadium: Stade de la Beaujoire

35	Nice	Cancelled	Nantes	Nice
--:-- CEST (UTC+2)				Stadium: Allianz Riviera

36	Nantes	Cancelled	Brest	Nantes
--:-- CEST (UTC+2)				Stadium: Stade de la Beaujoire

37	Montpellier	Cancelled	Nantes	Montpellier
--:-- CEST (UTC+2)				Stadium: Stade de la Mosson

38	Nantes	Cancelled	Strasbourg	Nantes
--:-- CEST (UTC+2)				Stadium: Stade de la Beaujoire

=== Coupe de France ===
4 January 2020 Round of 64	Aviron Bayonnais FC	0–2	Nantes	Bayonne
13:00 CET (UTC+1)	Fadiaga (yellow card) 65'; Chort (yellow card) 90'	Report	Coulibaly 13'; Girotto (yellow card) 65'; Moutoussamy (yellow card) 77'; Abeid 90+4'	Stadium: Stade Jean Dauger; Attendance: 8,000; Referee: Johan Hamel

18 January 2020 Round of 32	Nantes	3–4	Lyon	Nantes
20:55 CET (UTC+1)	Emond 16'; Basila (yellow card) 68'; Girotto (yellow card) 77'; Louza 83'; Simon 87'; Appiah (yellow card) 90+5'	Report	Cherki 1', 9'; Terrier 37'; Dembélé 69'; Marçal (yellow card) 90+4'; Tete (yellow card) 90+6'	Stadium: Stade de la Beaujoire; Attendance: 24,511; Referee: Mikael Lesage

=== Coupe de la Ligue ===
30 October 2019 Round of 32	Nantes	8–0	Paris FC	Nantes
21:05 CET (UTC+1)	Simon 22', 35', 43'; Youan 30'; Blas 36', 63'; Louza 47'; Basila (yellow card) 67'; Abeid 84'	Report	Saad (yellow card) 42'	Stadium: Stade de la Beaujoire; Attendance: 15,475; Referee: Jérémy Stinat

18 December 2019 Round of 16	Nantes	0–1	Strasbourg	Nantes
21:05 CET (UTC+1)		Report	Da Costa 78'	Stadium: Stade de la Beaujoire; Attendance: 9,565; Referee: Eric Wattellier

== Statistics ==
=== Appearances and goals ===
No.	Pos	Nat	Player	Total		Ligue 1		Coupe de France		Coupe de la Ligue	
No.	Pos	Nat	Player	Apps	Goals	Apps	Goals	Apps	Goals	Apps	Goals
Goalkeepers
1	GK	(France) FRA	Alban Lafont	29	0	27	0	2	0	0	0
16	GK	(France) FRA	Alexandre Olliero	2	0	0	0	0	0	2	0
30	GK	(Slovenia) SLO	Denis Petric	1	0	1	0	0	0	0	0
Defenders
2	DF	(Brazil) BRA	Fábio	10	0	10	0	0	0	0	0
3	DF	(France) FRA	Wesley Moustache	1	0	1	0	0	0	0	0
4	DF	(France) FRA	Nicolas Pallois	22	0	21	0	0	0	1	0
12	DF	(France) FRA	Dennis Appiah	22	0	18+1	0	2	0	1	0
13	DF	(Mali) MLI	Molla Wagué	11	0	8+1	0	1	0	1	0
14	DF	(Mali) MLI	Charles Traoré	23	0	20	0	2	0	1	0
20	MF	(Brazil) BRA	Andrei Girotto	28	1	25	1	2	0	1	0
23	DF	(France) FRA	Thomas Basila	10	0	3+4	0	1	0	2	0
25	DF	(Togo) TOG	Josué Homawoo	1	0	0+1	0	0	0	0	0
29	DF	(France) FRA	Batista Mendy	0	0	0	0	0	0	0	0
33	DF	(Peru) PER	Percy Prado	4	0	2+1	0	0	0	0+1	0
Midfielders
6	MF	(Brazil) BRA	Roli Pereira de Sa	2	0	0+1	0	0	0	1	0
10	MF	(Peru) PER	Cristian Benavente	13	0	4+8	0	0	0	1	0
11	MF	(Algeria) ALG	Mehdi Abeid	29	3	20+5	1	2	1	1+1	1
17	MF	(France) FRA	Ludovic Blas	28	7	22+2	5	2	0	1+1	2
18	MF	(Democratic Republic of the Congo) COD	Samuel Moutoussamy	31	0	3+25	0	1	0	2	0
19	MF	(France) FRA	Abdoulaye Touré	30	3	24+3	3	2	0	1	0
21	MF	(Slovenia) SLO	Rene Krhin	10	0	4+4	0	0+2	0	0	0
26	MF	(France) FRA	Imran Louza	28	4	22+2	2	2	1	1+1	1
27	MF	(Nigeria) NGR	Moses Simon	30	9	25+1	5	1+1	1	2	3
Forwards
7	FW	(Mali) MLI	Kalifa Coulibaly	23	5	18+3	4	1	1	0+1	0
8	FW	(France) FRA	Marcus Coco	1	0	1	0	0	0	0	0
15	FW	(Belgium) BEL	Anthony Limbombe	5	1	2+2	1	0+1	0	0	0
22	FW	(France) FRA	Bridge Ndilu	1	0	0	0	0+1	0	0	0
24	FW	(France) FRA	Élie Youan	7	1	2+3	0	0	0	2	1
28	FW	(Belgium) BEL	Renaud Emond	7	1	3+3	0	1	1	0	0
32	FW	(France) FRA	Kader Bamba	30	1	16+11	1	0+1	0	1+1	0
Players transferred out during the season

Last updated: 7 March 2020
Source: Competitions

=== Goalscorers ===
As of matches played until 4 February 2020

Rank	No.	Pos.	Player	Ligue 1	Coupe de France	Coupe de la Ligue	Total
1	27	MF	(Nigeria) Moses Simon	4	1	3	8
2	17	MF	(France) Ludovic Blas	5	0	2	7
3	7	FW	(Mali) Kalifa Coulibaly	4	1	0	5
4	26	MF	(France) Imran Louza	2	1	1	4
5	11	MF	(Algeria) Mehdi Abeid	1	1	1	3
5	19	MF	(France) Abdoulaye Touré	3	0	0	3
7	28	FW	(Belgium) Renaud Emond	0	1	0	1
7	33	FW	(France) Élie Youan	0	0	1	1
Own goals				3	0	0	3
TOTAL				22	5	8	35
