= 2022–23 FC Nantes season =

FC Nantes
2022–23 season
- Owner: Waldemar Kita
- President: Waldemar Kita
- Head coach: Antoine Kombouaré (until 9 May); Pierre Aristouy (from 9 May)
- Stadium: Stade de la Beaujoire
- Ligue 1: 16th
- Coupe de France: Runners-up
- Trophée des Champions: Runners-up
- UEFA Europa League: Knockout round play-offs
- Top goalscorer: League: Mostafa Mohamed (8); All: Ludovic Blas (12)
Home colours	Away colours	Third colours

The 2022–23 season was the 80th season in the history of FC Nantes and their 10th consecutive season in the top flight. The club participated in Ligue 1, the Coupe dr France, the Trophée des Champions and the UEFA Europa League. The season covers the period from 1 July 2022 to 30 June 2023.

Despite a 14-match winless run between February and May, which led them being in danger of relegation, Les Canaris ultimately preserved their top flight status with a 1–0 win over Angers, and Auxerre 1–3 defeat to Lens, thus avoiding a return to the second tier of French football for the first time since the 2012–13 season.

== Players ==
=== First-team squad ===
As of 30 January 2023

Note: Flags indicate national team as defined under FIFA eligibility rules; some limited exceptions apply. Players may hold more than one non-FIFA nationality.

No.	Pos.	Nation	Player
1	GK	FRA	Alban Lafont (captain)
3	DF	BRA	Andrei Girotto
4	DF	FRA	Nicolas Pallois (vice-captain)
5	MF	ESP	Pedro Chirivella
7	FW	FRA	Evann Guessand (on loan from Nice)
8	MF	COD	Samuel Moutoussamy
10	MF	FRA	Ludovic Blas
11	FW	FRA	Marcus Coco
14	FW	CMR	Ignatius Ganago
16	GK	FRA	Rémy Descamps
17	MF	FRA	Moussa Sissoko
21	DF	CMR	Jean-Charles Castelletto

No.	Pos.	Nation	Player
24	DF	FRA	Sébastien Corchia
25	MF	FRA	Florent Mollet
26	DF	FRA	Jaouen Hadjam
27	MF	NGR	Moses Simon
28	DF	FRA	Fabien Centonze
29	MF	FRA	Quentin Merlin
30	GK	SRB	Denis Petrić
31	FW	EGY	Mostafa Mohamed (on loan from Galatasaray)
38	DF	BRA	João Victor (on loan from Benfica)
93	DF	MLI	Charles Traoré
99	FW	ALG	Andy Delort (on loan from Nice)

=== Reserve squad ===
Note: Flags indicate national team as defined under FIFA eligibility rules; some limited exceptions apply. Players may hold more than one non-FIFA nationality.

No.	Pos.	Nation	Player
15	FW	COM	Adel Mahamoud
18	MF	FRA	Samuel Yepié Yepié
19	MF	FRA	Mohamed Achi
20	MF	FRA	Lohann Doucet
22	MF	ARM	Gor Manvelyan

No.	Pos.	Nation	Player
23	DF	FRA	Robin Voisine
55	FW	FRA	Kader Bamba
61	FW	FRA	Joe-Loïc Affamah
63	DF	CIV	Michel Junior Diaz

=== Out on loan ===
Note: Flags indicate national team as defined under FIFA eligibility rules; some limited exceptions apply. Players may hold more than one non-FIFA nationality.

No.	Pos.	Nation	Player
53	FW	FRA	Bridge Ndilu (at SO Cholet until 30 June 2023)
—	DF	FRA	Yannis M'Bemba (at Le Puy until 30 June 2023)

No.	Pos.	Nation	Player
—	DF	FRA	Ryan Sabry (at Stade Briochin until 30 June 2023)
—	MF	FRA	Abou Ba (at Seraing until 30 June 2023)

== Transfers ==
=== In ===
No.	Pos.	Player	Transferred from	Fee	Date	Source
55	FW	(France) Abdoul Kader Bamba	Amiens	Loan return	30 June 2022	
53	FW	(France) Bridge Ndilu	Quevilly Rouen	Loan return	30 June 2022	
17	MF	(France) Moussa Sissoko	(England) Watford	Undisclosed	1 July 2022	
7	FW	(France) Evann Guessand	Nice	Loan	12 July 2022	
31	FW	(Egypt) Mostafa Mohamed	(Turkey) Galatasaray	Loan	21 July 2022	
14	FW	(Cameroon) Ignatius Ganago	Lens	€4.4M	1 September 2022	
28	DF	(France) Fabien Centonze	Metz	€4M	22 September 2022	

=== Out ===
No.	Pos.	Player	Transferred to	Fee	Date	Source
26	FW	(Ghana) Osman Bukari	(Belgium) Gent	Loan return	30 June 2022	
8	MF	(France) Wylan Cyprien	(Italy) Parma	Loan return	30 June 2022	
19	FW	(France) Willem Geubbels	Monaco	Loan return	30 June 2022	
6	MF	(France) Roli Pereira de Sa	Sochaux	Free	1 July 2022	
20	FW	(France) Jean-Kévin Augustin	(Switzerland) Basel	Undisclosed	1 July 2022	
23	FW	(France) Randal Kolo Muani	(Germany) Eintracht Frankfurt	Free	1 July 2022	
7	FW	(Mali) Kalifa Coulibaly	(Serbia) Red Star Belgrade	Free	29 August 2022	
53	FW	(France) Bridge Ndilu	SO Cholet	Loan	17 September 2022	

== Pre-season and friendlies ==
Win Draw Loss Fixtures

13 July 2022 Friendly	Nantes	0–1	Guingamp	La Baule-Escoublac
16:00 CEST (UTC+2)			Livolant 86'	Stadium: Stade Moreau Défarges

16 July 2022 Friendly	Caen	0–2	Nantes	Avranches
17:00 CEST (UTC+2)			Blas 17' (pen.); Sissoko 54'	Stadium: Stade René-Fenouillère

23 July 2022 Friendly	Nantes	2–0	Lorient	La Baule-Escoublac
16:00 CEST (UTC+2)	Doucet 15'; Blas 76'			Stadium: Stade Moreau Défarges

27 July 2022 Friendly	Nantes	0–1	Rennes	Saint-Nazaire
17:00 CEST (UTC+2)			Guirassy 49'	Stadium: Stade Léo Lagrange

16 December 2022 Friendly	Nantes	1–1	Laval	Nantes
15:30 CET (UTC+1)				Stadium: Stade de la Beaujoire

21 December 2022 Friendly	Lorient	2–1	Nantes	Vannes
18:00 CET (UTC+1)				Stadium: Stade de la Rabine

== Competitions ==
=== Overall record ===
Competition	First match	Last match	Starting round	Final position	Record							
Competition	First match	Last match	Starting round	Final position	Pld	W	D	L	GF	GA	GD	Win %
Ligue 1	7 August 2022	3 June 2023	Matchday 1	16th	38	7	15	16	37	55	−18	18.42
Coupe de France	7 January 2023	29 April 2023	Round of 64	Runners-up	6	3	2	1	7	7	+0	50.00
Trophée des Champions	31 July 2022		Final	Runners-up	1	0	0	1	0	4	−4	0.00
UEFA Europa League	8 September 2022	23 February 2023	Group stage	Knockout round play-offs	8	3	1	4	7	15	−8	37.50
Total					53	13	18	22	51	81	−30	24.53

Source: Soccerway

=== Ligue 1 ===
==== League table ====
Pos	Team	Pld	W	D	L	GF	GA	GD	Pts	Qualification or relegation
14	Brest	38	11	11	16	44	54	−10	44	
15	Strasbourg	38	9	13	16	51	59	−8	40	
16	Nantes	38	7	15	16	37	55	−18	36	
17	Auxerre (R)	38	8	11	19	35	63	−28	35	Relegation to Ligue 2
18	Ajaccio (R)	38	7	5	26	23	74	−51	26	Relegation to Ligue 2

Source: Ligue 1
Rules for classification: 1) Points; 2) Goal difference; 3) Head-to-head points; 4) Head-to-head goal difference; 5) Head-to-head goals scored; 6) Head-to-head away goals scored; 7) Goals scored; 8) Away goals scored; 9) Fair-play points (Note: Head-to-head record is used only after all the matches between the teams in question have been played).
(R) Relegated

==== Results summary ====
Overall								Home						Away					
Pld	W	D	L	GF	GA	GD	Pts	W	D	L	GF	GA	GD	W	D	L	GF	GA	GD
38	7	15	16	37	55	−18	36	5	8	6	20	26	−6	2	7	10	17	29	−12

Source: Ligue 1

==== Results by round ====
Round	1	2	3	4	5	6	7	8	9	10	11	12	13	14	15	16	17	18	19	20	21	22	23	24	25	26	27	28	29	30	31	32	33	34	35	36	37	38
Ground	A	H	A	H	A	H	A	H	A	A	H	A	H	A	H	A	H	H	A	A	H	A	H	A	H	A	H	A	H	H	A	H	A	H	A	H	A	H
Result	D	D	L	W	D	L	L	D	L	L	W	D	D	L	D	D	W	D	W	D	L	W	W	L	L	L	D	D	L	D	L	D	L	L	D	L	L	W
Position	11	13	15	11	10	13	15	15	16	19	14	15	15	16	15	16	15	14	13	13	13	13	13	13	13	14	14	14	14	15	15	16	17	17	17	17	17	16

Source: Ligue 1
A = Away; H = Home; W = Win; D = Draw; L = Loss

==== Matches ====
The league fixtures were announced on 17 June 2022.

7 August 2022 1	Angers	0–0	Nantes	Angers
15:00 CEST (UTC+2)	Capelle (yellow card) 41'; Doumbia (yellow card) 53'	Report	Sissoko (yellow card) 37'; Merlin (yellow card) 60'; Corchia (yellow card) 84'	Stadium: Stade Raymond Kopa; Attendance: 12,000; Referee: Hakim Ben El Hadj

12 August 2022 2	Nantes	1–1	Lille	Nantes
21:00 CEST (UTC+2)	Simon 28'; Girotto (yellow card) 90'	Report	Zedadka (yellow card) 14'; Djaló (yellow card) 18'; Fonte (yellow card) 18'; André (yellow card) 37'; Ismaily 76'	Stadium: Stade de la Beaujoire; Attendance: 30,689; Referee: Bastien Dechepy

20 August 2022 3	Marseille	2–1	Nantes	Marseille
21:00 CEST (UTC+2)	Rongier (yellow card) 53'; Gigot (yellow card) 60' (yellow-red card) 76'; Mbemba 70'; López (yellow card) 76'; Pallois 82' (o.g.); Veretout (yellow card) 90+4'	Report	Guessand (yellow card) 59'; Blas 78' (pen.)	Stadium: Stade Vélodrome; Attendance: 63,147; Referee: Jérémie Pignard

28 August 2022 4	Nantes	3–1	Toulouse	Nantes
13:00 CEST (UTC+2)	Guessand 50'; Mohamed 56'; Simon 61'	Report	Aboukhlal 15'; Van den Boomen (yellow card) 36'; Dejaegere (yellow card) 45'; Nicolaisen (yellow card) 87'	Stadium: Stade de la Beaujoire; Attendance: 26,574; Referee: Mathieu Vernice

31 August 2022 5	Strasbourg	1–1	Nantes	Strasbourg
19:00 CEST (UTC+2)	Diallo 28'	Report	Moutoussamy (yellow card) 34'; Fábio (yellow card) 69'; Mohamed 85'; Descamps (yellow card) 89'	Stadium: Stade de la Meinau; Attendance: 25,162; Referee: Clément Turpin

3 September 2022 6	Nantes	0–3	Paris Saint-Germain	Nantes
21:00 CEST (UTC+2)	Fábio (red card) 24'; Pallois (yellow card) 33'	Report	Mbappé 18', 54', (yellow card) 57'; Bernat (yellow card) 45+2'; Verratti (yellow card) 50'; Mendes 68'; Ramos (yellow card) 69'	Stadium: Stade de la Beaujoire; Attendance: 34,406; Referee: Pierre Gaillouste

11 September 2022 7	Lorient	3–2	Nantes	Lorient
15:00 CEST (UTC+2)	Ouattara 19'; Cathline 60'; Koné 74', (yellow card) 78'; Laporte (yellow card) 76'	Report	Ganago 13'; Simon (yellow card) 40', (goal) 85'; Chirivella (yellow card) 45'; Appiah (yellow card) 56'	Stadium: Stade du Moustoir; Attendance: 15,080; Referee: Johan Hamel

18 September 2022 8	Nantes	0–0	Lens	Nantes
17:05 CEST (UTC+2)	Moutoussamy (yellow card) 79'	Report	Abdul Samed (yellow card) 90+2'	Stadium: Stade de la Beaujoire; Attendance: 28,854; Referee: Willy Delajod

2 October 2022 9	Monaco	4–1	Nantes	Monaco
17:05 CEST (UTC+2)	Embolo 2'; Ben Yedder 6', 28', 62' (pen.)	Report	Girotto (yellow card) 60'; Caio Henrique 79' (o.g.)	Stadium: Stade Louis II; Attendance: 5,202; Referee: Thomas Léonard

9 October 2022 10	Rennes	3–0	Nantes	Rennes
17:05 CEST (UTC+2)	Gouiri 26'; Traoré (yellow card) 61'; Terrier 79'; D. Doué 84'; Rodon (red card) 88'	Report		Stadium: Roazhon Park; Attendance: 27,844; Referee: Florent Batta

16 October 2022 11	Nantes	4–1	Brest	Nantes
15:00 CEST (UTC+2)	Blas (penalty missed) 12'; Simon 35' (pen.); Ganago 36'; Mohamed 71'; Sissoko 88'	Report	Fadiga 18'; Lees-Melou (yellow card) 33'; Pereira Lage (yellow card) 40'	Stadium: Stade de la Beaujoire; Attendance: 25,759; Referee: Marc Bollengier

23 October 2022 12	Nice	1–1	Nantes	Nice
17:05 CEST (UTC+2)	Todibo (yellow card) 60'; Bryan (yellow card) 68'; Bard (yellow card) 81'; Pépé 90+7' (pen.)	Report	Ganago 49'; Sissoko (yellow card) 84'; Lafont (yellow card) 90+4' (yellow-red card) 90+9'; Bamba (red card) 90+8'; Moutoussamy (yellow card) 90+9'	Stadium: Allianz Riviera; Attendance: 20,166; Referee: François Letexier

30 October 2022 13	Nantes	1–1	Clermont	Nantes
15:00 CET (UTC+1)	Mohamed 73'	Report	Caufriez (yellow card) 32'; Borges 54'; Magnin (yellow card) 67'	Stadium: Stade de la Beaujoire; Attendance: 30,894; Referee: Benoît Bastien

6 November 2022 14	Reims	1–0	Nantes	Reims
15:00 CEST (UTC+2)	Cajuste (yellow card) 8'; Balogun 83' (pen.)	Report	Pallois (yellow card) 30' (yellow-red card) 54'; Blas (yellow card) 58'; Moutoussamy (yellow card) 90+1'	Stadium: Stade Auguste-Delaune; Attendance: 11,477; Referee: Ruddy Buquet

13 November 2022 15	Nantes	2–2	Ajaccio	Nantes
15:00 CET (UTC+1)	Blas (yellow card) 37', (goal) 70'; Castelletto (yellow card) 45+1'; Girotto (yellow card) 62'; Simon 89'	Report	Koné (yellow card) 35'; Nouri (yellow card) 45+1'; Gonzalez (yellow card) 51'; Belaïli 57' (pen.); Hamouma 66'; Marchetti (yellow card) 90'	Stadium: Stade de la Beaujoire; Attendance: 29,407; Referee: Jérémie Pignard

28 December 2022 16	Troyes	0–0	Nantes	Troyes
21:00 CEST (UTC+2)		Report	Castelletto (yellow card) 15'; Centonze (yellow card) 79'	Stadium: Stade de l'Aube; Attendance: 9,043; Referee: Stéphanie Frappart

1 January 2023 17	Nantes	1–0	Auxerre	Nantes
15:00 CET (UTC+1)	Coco 74'; Moutoussamy (yellow card) 90+1'	Report	Mensah (yellow card) 21'; Camara (yellow card) 82'	Stadium: Stade de la Beaujoire; Attendance: 23,266; Referee: Benoît Bastien

11 January 2023 18	Nantes	0–0	Lyon	Nantes
19:00 CET (UTC+1)	Traoré (yellow card) 68'; Corchia (yellow card) 90'	Report	Tetê (yellow card) 53'; Lukeba (yellow card) 75'; Kumbedi (yellow card) 84'	Stadium: Stade de la Beaujoire; Attendance: 27,657; Referee: Marc Bollengier

15 January 2023 19	Montpellier	0–3	Nantes	Montpellier
15:00 CET (UTC+1)	Khazri (red card) 42'; Wahi (yellow card) 67' (yellow-red card) 67'	Report	Guessand (yellow card) 45+11'; Girotto 45+13'; Simon (yellow card) 69'; Mohamed 81'; Blas 84'	Stadium: Stade de la Mosson; Attendance: 10,947; Referee: Thomas Léonard

29 January 2023 20	Clermont	0–0	Nantes	Clermont-Ferrand
15:00 CET (UTC+1)	Caufriez (yellow card) 12'; Seidu (yellow card) 54'	Report	Sissoko (yellow card) 12'	Stadium: Stade Gabriel Montpied; Attendance: 11,015; Referee: Florent Batta

1 February 2023 21	Nantes	0–2	Marseille	Nantes
19:00 CET (UTC+1)	Traoré (yellow card) 12'; Mollet (yellow card) 26'; Centonze (yellow card) 45'; Simon (yellow card) 66'	Report	Malinovskyi (yellow card) 16'; João Victor 56' (o.g.); Balerdi (yellow card) 78'; López (yellow card) 86'; Ounahi 90+2'	Stadium: Stade de la Beaujoire; Attendance: 34,125; Referee: Willy Delajod

5 February 2023 22	Ajaccio	0–2	Nantes	Ajaccio
15:00 CET (UTC+1)	Chabrolle (yellow card) 19'; El Idrissy (yellow card) 56'; Diallo (red card) 88'	Report	João Victor (yellow card) 56'; Guessand 63'; Blas 89' (pen.)	Stadium: Stade François Coty; Attendance: 11,598; Referee: Ruddy Buquet

12 February 2023 23	Nantes	1–0	Lorient	Nantes
17:05 CET (UTC+1)	Blas 66'	Report		Stadium: Stade de la Beaujoire; Attendance: 33,579; Referee: Mathieu Vernice

19 February 2023 24	Lens	3–1	Nantes	Lens
17:05 CET (UTC+1)	Machado 34'; Thomasson 36'; Traoré 74' (o.g.)	Report	Mollet 41'	Stadium: Stade Bollaert-Delelis; Attendance: 37,984; Referee: Pierre Gaillouste

26 February 2023 25	Nantes	0–1	Rennes	Nantes
15:00 CET (UTC+1)	Centonze (yellow card) 78'; Coco (yellow card) 89'	Report	Doku 19'; Omari (yellow card) 81'; Gouiri (yellow card) 90+3'	Stadium: Stade de la Beaujoire; Attendance: 34,467; Referee: Jérémie Pignard

4 March 2023 26	Paris Saint-Germain	4–2	Nantes	Paris
21:00 CET (UTC+1)	Messi 12'; Hadjam 17' (o.g.); Pereira 60'; Mbappé 90+2'	Report	Blas 31'; Ganago 38'; Hadjam (yellow card) 63'; Girotto (yellow card) 69'	Stadium: Parc des Princes; Attendance: 47,000; Referee: Jérémy Stinat

12 March 2023 27	Nantes	2–2	Nice	Nantes
15:00 CET (UTC+1)	Moutoussamy (yellow card) 29'; Sissoko 31'; Blas (penalty missed) 35'; Mohamed 88'	Report	Moffi 5'; Bard (yellow card) 30'; Ndayishimiye 71'	Stadium: Stade de la Beaujoire; Attendance: 33,568; Referee: Willy Delajod

17 March 2022 28	Lyon	1–1	Nantes	Décines-Charpieu
21:00 CET (UTC+1)	Lacazette 24'	Report	Lukeba 2' (o.g.); João Victor (yellow card) 29'	Stadium: Parc Olympique Lyonnais; Attendance: 38,880; Referee: Benoît Millot

2 April 2023 29	Nantes	0–3	Reims	Nantes
15:00 CEST (UTC+2)	Girotto (yellow card) 48'	Report	Cajuste (yellow card) 16'; Flips 37', 38'; Munetsi 57'; Matusiwa (yellow card) 78'	Stadium: Stade de la Beaujoire; Attendance: 26,285; Referee: Marc Bollengier

9 April 2023 30	Nantes	2–2	Monaco	Nantes
17:05 CEST (UTC+2)	Girotto (yellow card) 56'; Corchia (yellow card) 62'; Mohamed 65'; Blas 78', (yellow card) 79'	Report	Disasi 21'; Matazo 30'; Volland (yellow card) 87'	Stadium: Stade de la Beaujoire; Attendance: 30,050; Referee: Clément Turpin

16 April 2023 31	Auxerre	2–1	Nantes	Auxerre
15:00 CEST (UTC+2)	Jubal 5' (pen.); Zedadka (yellow card) 33'; Da Costa 43'; I. Touré (yellow card) 90+4'	Report	João Victor (yellow card) 36'; Mohamed 55'; Pallois (yellow card) 89'	Stadium: Stade de l'Abbé-Deschamps; Attendance: 15,714; Referee: Éric Wattellier

23 April 2023 32	Nantes	2–2	Troyes	Nantes
15:00 CEST (UTC+2)	Pallois 25'; Centonze (yellow card) 90+1'; Guessand 90+6'	Report	M. Baldé 64' (pen.); Odobert 90+2'; Agoumé (yellow card) 90+9'	Stadium: Stade de la Beaujoire; Attendance: 34,082; Referee: Jérémie Pignard

30 April 2023 33	Brest	2–0	Nantes	Brest
21:00 CEST (UTC+2)	Le Douaron 17'; Pereira Lage 34'	Report	Moutoussamy (yellow card) 84'	Stadium: Stade Francis-Le Blé; Attendance: 14,470; Referee: Willy Delajod

7 May 2023 34	Nantes	0–2	Strasbourg	Nantes
15:00 CEST (UTC+2)	João Victor (yellow card) 45'; Coco (yellow card) 53'; Mollet (yellow card) 76'	Report	Diallo 27' (pen.); Diarra 47'; Dagba (yellow card) 68'	Stadium: Stade de la Beaujoire; Attendance: 28,563; Referee: Benoît Bastien

14 May 2023 35	Toulouse	0–0	Nantes	Toulouse
15:00 CEST (UTC+2)	Desler (yellow card) 90+2'	Report	Girotto (yellow card) 58'	Stadium: Stadium de Toulouse; Attendance: 27,033; Referee: Jérôme Brisard

21 May 2023 36	Nantes	0–3	Montpellier	Nantes
17:00 CEST (UTC+2)	Merlin (yellow card) 20'; Moutoussamy (yellow card) 49'; Mollet (yellow card) 58'; Blas (yellow card) 77'	Report	Ferri 38'; Nordin 47'; Sacko 88'	Stadium: Stade de la Beaujoire; Attendance: 30,170; Referee: Ruddy Buquet

27 May 2023 37	Lille	2–1	Nantes	Villeneuve-d'Ascq
21:00 CEST (UTC+2)	Baleba (yellow card) 43'; David 50' (pen.), 87' (pen.), (yellow card) 88'	Report	Merlin 17'; Castelletto (yellow card) 35'; João Victor (yellow card) 78'; Mohamed (yellow card) 85'; Blas (yellow card) 86'	Stadium: Stade Pierre-Mauroy; Attendance: 41,136; Referee: Éric Wattellier

3 June 2023 38	Nantes	1–0	Angers	Nantes
21:00 CEST (UTC+2)	Ganago 16'; Blas (yellow card) 90+4'	Report		Stadium: Stade de la Beaujoire; Attendance: 27,650; Referee: Clément Turpin

=== Coupe de France ===
7 January 2023 Round of 64	AF Virois	0–2	Nantes	Caen
18:00 CET (UTC+1)	Epailly (yellow card) 20'	Report	Mohamed 29'; Guessand 55'	Stadium: Michel d'Ornano; Attendance: 8,500; Referee: Benoît Millot

22 January 2023 Round of 32	ES Thaon	0–0 (2–4 p)	Nantes	Épinal
18:30 CET (UTC+1)	Cissé (yellow card) 45+1'; Condi (yellow card) 48'; Dufour (yellow card) 48'	Report	Castelletto (yellow card) 56'; Girotto (yellow card) 64'; Hadjam (yellow card) 85'	Stadium: Stade de la Colombière; Attendance: 5,500; Referee: Hakim Ben El Hadj
	Penalties
	Colin (penalty scored); Koriche (penalty scored); Gazagnes (penalty missed); Didierjean (penalty missed)		(penalty scored) Guessand; (penalty scored) Hadjam; (penalty scored) Girotto; (penalty missed) Ganago; (penalty scored) Mohamed

8 February 2023 Round of 16	Angers	1–1 (2–4 p)	Nantes	Angers
18:15 CET (UTC+1)	Sima 6'	Report	Guessand (yellow card) 54'; Mollet 87'; Traoré (yellow card) 90'	Stadium: Stade Raymond Kopa; Attendance: 13,934; Referee: Benoît Bastien
	Penalties
	Salama (penalty missed); Ghoulam (penalty missed); Hunou (penalty scored); Thioub (penalty scored)		(penalty scored) Delort; (penalty scored) Mohamed; (penalty scored) Mollet; (penalty scored) João Victor

1 March 2023 Quarter-finals	Nantes	2–1	Lens	Nantes
18:15 CET (UTC+1)	Delort 31' (pen.), 59' (pen.)	Report	Fofana 28'; Leca (yellow card) 90+1'	Stadium: Stade de la Beaujoire; Attendance: 0 Referee: Clément Turpin

5 April 2023 Semi-finals	Nantes	1–0	Lyon	Nantes
21:15 CEST (UTC+2)	Blas 57'; Girotto (yellow card) 83'	Report	Tolisso (yellow card) 45+4'; Lovren (yellow card) 90+5'	Stadium: Stade de la Beaujoire; Attendance: 34,687; Referee: Bastien Dechepy

29 April 2023 Final	Nantes	1–5	Toulouse	Saint-Denis
21:00 CEST (UTC+2)	João Victor (yellow card) 26'; Pallois (yellow card) 38'; Descamps (yellow card) 43'; Blas 75' (pen.)	Report	Costa 4', 10'; Dallinga 23', 31'; Dejaegere (yellow card) 58'; Aboukhlal 79'; Desler (yellow card) 88'	Stadium: Stade de France; Attendance: 78,038; Referee: Benoît Millot

=== Trophée des Champions ===
31 July 2022 Final	Paris Saint-Germain	4–0	Nantes	Tel Aviv
21:00 CEST (UTC+2)	Vitinha (yellow card) 16'; Messi 22'; Neymar 45+5', 82' (pen.); Ramos 57'	Report	Coco (yellow card) 38'; Moutoussamy (yellow card) 75'; Castelletto (red card) 81'	Stadium: Bloomfield Stadium; Attendance: 28,000; Referee: Orel Grinfeld (Israel)

=== UEFA Europa League ===
==== Group stage ====
The draw for the group stage was held on 26 August 2022.

Pos	Team	Pld	W	D	L	GF	GA	GD	Pts	Qualification	FRE	NAN	QRB	OLY
1	(Germany) SC Freiburg	6	4	2	0	13	3	+10	14	Advance to round of 16	—	2–0	2–1	1–1
2	(France) Nantes	6	3	0	3	6	11	−5	9	Advance to knockout round play-offs	0–4	—	2–1	2–1
3	(Azerbaijan) Qarabağ	6	2	2	2	9	5	+4	8	Transfer to Europa Conference League	1–1	3–0	—	0–0
4	(Greece) Olympiacos	6	0	2	4	2	11	−9	2		0–3	0–2	0–3	—

Source: UEFA
Rules for classification: Group stage tiebreakers

8 September 2022 1	Nantes (France)	2–1	(Greece) Olympiacos	Nantes
21:00 CEST (UTC+2)	Mohamed 32'; Sissoko (yellow card) 72'; Pallois (yellow card) 85'; Blas (yellow card) 90+2'; Guessand 90+3'	Report	Moutoussamy 50' (o.g.); Retsos (yellow card) 56'; Reabciuk (yellow card) 90+2'	Stadium: Stade de la Beaujoire; Attendance: 31,276; Referee: Harald Lechner (Austria)

15 September 2022 2	Qarabağ (Azerbaijan)	3–0	(France) Nantes	Baku, Azerbaijan
20:45 AZT (UTC+4)	Owusu 60'; Zoubir 65'; Janković 72'; Cafarguliyev (yellow card) 87'	Report	Girotto (yellow card) 80'	Stadium: Tofiq Bahramov Republican Stadium; Attendance: 26,495; Referee: Enea Jorgji (Albania)

6 October 2022 3	SC Freiburg (Germany)	2–0	(France) Nantes	Freiburg im Breisgau, Germany
21:00 CEST (UTC+2)	Kyereh 48'; Sildillia (yellow card) 66'; Grifo 72'; Günter (yellow card) 78'; Keitel (yellow card) 90'	Report	Mohamed (yellow card) 66'	Stadium: Europa-Park Stadion; Attendance: 33,200; Referee: Glenn Nyberg (Sweden)

13 October 2022 4	Nantes (France)	0–4	(Germany) SC Freiburg	Nantes
18:45 CEST (UTC+2)		Report	Kübler 25'; Höfler (yellow card) 66'; Gregoritsch 71'; Schade 82'; Jeong 87'	Stadium: Stade de la Beaujoire; Attendance: 31,845; Referee: Horațiu Feșnic (Romania)

27 October 2022 5	Nantes (France)	2–1	(Azerbaijan) Qarabağ	Nantes
21:00 CEST (UTC+2)	Blas 17'; Bamba (yellow card) 41'; Girotto (yellow card) 60'; Chirivella (yellow card) 90+4'; Ganago 90+5'	Report	Ozobić 56' (pen.); Vešović (yellow card) 82'	Stadium: Stade de la Beaujoire; Attendance: 30,927; Referee: Jakob Kehlet (Denmark)

3 November 2022 6	Olympiacos (Greece)	0–2	(France) Nantes	Piraeus, Greece
19:45 EET (UTC+2)	Retsos (yellow card) 90+3'	Report	Castelletto (yellow card) 48'; Moutoussamy (yellow card) 67'; Mohamed 79'; Blas 90'	Stadium: Karaiskakis Stadium; Attendance: 16,254; Referee: Serhiy Boyko (Ukraine)

==== Knockout phase ====
===== Knockout round play-offs =====
The draw for the knockout round play-offs was held on 7 November 2022.

16 February 2023 First leg	Juventus (Italy)	1–1	(France) Nantes	Turin, Italy
21:00 CET (UTC+1)	Vlahović 13'; Chiesa (yellow card) 54'; Danilo (yellow card) 75'	Report	Castelletto (yellow card) 45+1'; Mohamed (yellow card) 57'; Blas 60'; Corchia (yellow card) 90'	Stadium: Juventus Stadium; Attendance: 41,019; Referee: João Pinheiro (Portugal)

23 February 2023 Second leg	Nantes (France)	0–3 (1–4 agg.)	(Italy) Juventus	Nantes
18:45 CET (UTC+1)	Pallois (red card) 17'; Traoré (yellow card) 81'	Report	Di María 5', 20' (pen.), 78'; Cuadrado (yellow card) 87'	Stadium: Stade de la Beaujoire; Attendance: 44,000; Referee: José María Sánchez Martínez (Spain)
