= 2020–21 FC Nantes season =

FC Nantes
2020–21 season
- Owner: Waldemar Kita
- President: Waldemar Kita
- Head coach: Christian Gourcuff (until 8 December); Patrick Collot (caretaker, from 8 December); Raymond Domenech (from 26 December to 11 February); Antoine Kombouaré (from 11 February)
- Stadium: Stade de la Beaujoire
- Ligue 1: 18th (play-off winners)
- Coupe de France: Round of 64
- Top goalscorer: League: Ludovic Blas (10); All: Ludovic Blas (11)
- Biggest win: Dijon 0–4 Nantes
- Biggest defeat: Nantes 0–4 Strasbourg
Home colours	Away colours	Third colours

The 2020–21 season was the 77th season in the existence of FC Nantes and the club's 8th consecutive season in the top flight of French football. In addition to the domestic league, Nantes participated in this season's edition of the Coupe de France. The season covered the period from 1 July 2020 to 30 June 2021.

== Players ==
=== First-team squad ===
As of 29 January 2021

Note: Flags indicate national team as defined under FIFA eligibility rules; some limited exceptions apply. Players may hold more than one non-FIFA nationality.

No.	Pos.	Nation	Player
1	GK	FRA	Alban Lafont (on loan from Fiorentina)
2	DF	BRA	Fábio
3	MF	BRA	Andrei Girotto
4	DF	FRA	Nicolas Pallois (captain)
5	MF	ESP	Pedro Chirivella
6	MF	FRA	Roli Pereira de Sa
7	FW	MLI	Kalifa Coulibaly
10	MF	FRA	Ludovic Blas
11	FW	FRA	Marcus Coco
12	DF	FRA	Dennis Appiah
14	DF	MLI	Charles Traoré
15	DF	FRA	Thomas Basila
17	FW	BEL	Anthony Limbombe

No.	Pos.	Nation	Player
19	MF	FRA	Abdoulaye Touré
20	FW	FRA	Jean-Kévin Augustin
21	DF	CMR	Jean-Charles Castelletto
22	FW	FRA	Bridge Ndilu
23	FW	FRA	Randal Kolo
24	DF	FRA	Sébastien Corchia
26	MF	FRA	Imran Louza
27	FW	NGR	Moses Simon
28	FW	BEL	Renaud Emond
29	MF	FRA	Batista Mendy
30	GK	SLO	Denis Petrić
32	FW	FRA	Kader Bamba
40	GK	FRA	Charly Jan

=== Players out on loan ===
Note: Flags indicate national team as defined under FIFA eligibility rules; some limited exceptions apply. Players may hold more than one non-FIFA nationality.

No.	Pos.	Nation	Player
—	DF	MLI	Molla Wagué (at Amiens until 30 June 2021)
—	MF	FRA	Abou Ba (at Cosenza until 30 June 2021)
—	MF	FRA	Abdoulaye Dabo (at Juventus U23 until 30 June 2021)

No.	Pos.	Nation	Player
—	MF	COD	Samuel Moutoussamy (at Fortuna Sittard until 30 June 2021)
—	MF	BRA	Lucas Evangelista (at Red Bull Bragantino until 30 June 2021)
—	FW	FRA	Élie Youan (at St. Gallen until 30 June 2021)

== Transfers ==
=== In ===
No.	Pos	Player	Transferred from	Fee	Date	Source
5	MF	(Spain) Pedro Chirivella	(England) Liverpool	Free	1 July 2020	
27	FW	(Nigeria) Moses Simon	(Spain) Levante	€5M	1 July 2020	
20	FW	(France) Jean-Kévin Augustin	(Germany) RB Leipzig	Free	6 October 2020	

=== Out ===
No.	Pos	Player	Transferred to	Fee	Date	Source
10	MF	(Peru) Cristian Benavente	(Egypt) Pyramids	Loan return	1 July 2020	

== Pre-season and friendlies ==
Win Draw Loss

18 July 2020 Friendly	Nantes	6–0	FC Stade Nyonnais	Annecy-le-Vieux, France
17:00 CEST (UTC+2)	Coco 7'; Girotto 15'; Blas 43'; Kolo 57'; Moutoussamy 61'; Emond 65'	Report		Stadium: Complexe Sportif D'Albigny; Attendance: 200

25 July 2020 Friendly	Anderlecht	0–0	Nantes	Anderlecht, Belgium
15:00 CEST (UTC+2)		Report		Stadium: RSCA Football Academy; Attendance: 0

1 August 2020 Friendly	Bordeaux	Cancelled	Nantes	La Roche-sur-Yon, France
--:-- CEST (UTC+2)				Stadium: Stade Henri Desgrange

1 August 2020 Friendly	Charleroi	Cancelled	Nantes	Charleroi, Belgium
16:30 CEST (UTC+2)

15 August 2020 Friendly	Nantes	Cancelled	Saint-Étienne	La Baule, France
18:00 CEST (UTC+2)				Stadium: Stade Moreau Défarges

15 August 2020 Friendly	Nantes	3–1	Le Havre	La Baule, France
16:00 CEST (UTC+2)	Simon 7'; Coulibaly 49'; Ndilu 90+2'	Report	Abdelli 45+2' (pen.)	Stadium: Stade Moreau Défarges; Referee: Jérémy Stinat

9 October 2020 Friendly	Nantes	1–2	Angers	Basse-Goulaine, France
11:00 CEST (UTC+2)	Augustin 11'	Report	Thomas 68'; Fulgini 90+2'	Stadium: Complexe Sportif Henri Michel

== Competitions ==
=== Overview ===
Competition	First match	Last match	Starting round	Final position	Record							
Competition	First match	Last match	Starting round	Final position	Pld	W	D	L	GF	GA	GD	Win %
Ligue 1	21 August 2020	23 May 2021	Matchday 1	18th	38	9	13	16	47	55	−8	23.68
Ligue 1 relegation play-offs	27 May 2021	30 May 2021	First leg	Winners	2	1	0	1	2	2	+0	50.00
Coupe de France	10 February 2021		Round of 64	Round of 64	1	0	0	1	2	4	−2	0.00
Total					41	10	13	18	51	61	−10	24.39

Source: Soccerway

=== Ligue 1 ===
==== League table ====
Pos	Team	Pld	W	D	L	GF	GA	GD	Pts	Qualification or relegation
16	Lorient	38	11	9	18	50	68	−18	42	
17	Brest	38	11	8	19	50	66	−16	41	
18	Nantes (O)	38	9	13	16	47	55	−8	40	Qualification for the Relegation play-offs
19	Nîmes (R)	38	9	8	21	40	71	−31	35	Relegation to the Ligue 2
20	Dijon (R)	38	4	9	25	25	73	−48	21	Relegation to the Ligue 2

Source: Ligue 1
Rules for classification: 1) Points; 2) Goal difference; 3) Goals scored; 4) Head-to-head goal difference; 5) Fairplay ranking.
(O) Play-off winners; (R) Relegated

==== Results summary ====
Overall								Home						Away					
Pld	W	D	L	GF	GA	GD	Pts	W	D	L	GF	GA	GD	W	D	L	GF	GA	GD
38	9	13	16	47	55	−8	40	3	8	8	21	29	−8	6	5	8	26	26	0

Source: Ligue 1

==== Results by round ====
Round	1	2	3	4	5	6	7	8	9	10	11	12	13	14	15	16	17	18	19	20	21	22	23	24	25	26	27	28	29	30	31	32	33	34	35	36	37	38
Ground	A	H	A	H	A	A	H	A	H	A	H	A	H	H	A	H	A	H	A	H	A	H	A	H	A	H	A	H	A	H	H	A	H	A	A	H	A	H
Result	D	W	L	D	L	L	W	D	L	W	D	L	L	D	L	D	L	D	D	D	L	L	D	L	W	D	D	L	W	D	L	L	L	W	W	W	W	L
Position	9	6	12	14	15	16	15	15	17	14	14	14	14	14	16	15	16	17	17	17	17	17	17	18	18	17	19	19	18	19	19	19	19	18	18	18	18	18

Source: Ligue 1
A = Away; H = Home; W = Win; D = Draw; L = Loss

==== Matches ====
The league fixtures were announced on 9 July 2020.

21 August 2020 1	Bordeaux	0–0	Nantes	Bordeaux
19:00 CEST (UTC+2)	Zerkane (red card) 20'; De Préville (yellow card) 59'; Otávio (yellow card) 87'	Report	Traoré (yellow card) 45'; Chirivella (yellow card) 89'; Ndilu (yellow card) 90+1'	Stadium: Matmut Atlantique; Referee: Benoît Bastien
Note: Match originally scheduled for 22 August, but brought forward instead of the postponed Marseille–Saint-Étienne match.

30 August 2020 2	Nantes	2–1	Nîmes	Nantes
15:00 CEST (UTC+2)	Fábio (yellow card) 9' (yellow-red card) 87'; Girotto 11'; Louza 27' (pen.), (red card) 47'; Lafont (yellow card) 90+3'	Report	Denkey (yellow card) 3'; Landre (yellow card) 35'; Ferhat 57'	Stadium: Stade de la Beaujoire; Referee: Hakim Ben El Hadj

13 September 2020 3	Monaco	2–1	Nantes	Monaco
17:00 CEST (UTC+2)	Diop 5', (yellow card) 7'; Tchouaméni (yellow card) 11'; Geubbels 65', (yellow card) 68'	Report	Touré (yellow card) 9'; Blas 61'	Stadium: Stade Louis II; Referee: Clément Turpin

20 September 2020 4	Nantes	2–2	Saint-Étienne	Nantes
17:00 CEST (UTC+2)	Pallois (yellow card) 68'; Simon 71'; Emond 86'; Bamba (yellow card) 90'	Report	Aouchiche 2'; Moueffek (yellow card) 42'; Maçon 66'; Sidibe (yellow card) 84'	Stadium: Stade de la Beaujoire; Referee: Antony Gautier

25 September 2020 5	Lille	2–0	Nantes	Villeneuve-d'Ascq
21:00 CEST (UTC+2)	Pallois 43' (o.g.); Yılmaz 87' (pen.)	Report	Appiah (yellow card) 85'; Girotto (yellow card) 90+4'	Stadium: Stade Pierre-Mauroy; Referee: Willy Delajod

3 October 2020 6	Nice	2–1	Nantes	Nice
21:00 CEST (UTC+2)	Dante 27'; Thuram (yellow card) 28', (goal) 62'; Pelmard (yellow card) 45+5'	Report	Girotto (red card) 3'; Louza 45+5' (pen.); Pallois (yellow card) 56'	Stadium: Allianz Riviera; Referee: Jérôme Brisard

18 October 2020 7	Nantes	3–1	Brest	Nantes
15:00 CEST (UTC+2)	Kolo 16'; Blas 30'; Abeid (yellow card) 38'; Fábio (yellow card) 47'; Pallois (yellow card) 67'; Bamba 79'	Report	Duverne (yellow card) 42'; Magnetti (yellow card) 60'; Faivre 68'	Stadium: Stade de la Beaujoire; Referee: Jérémie Pignard

31 October 2020 9	Nantes	0–3	Paris Saint-Germain	Nantes
21:00 CET (UTC+1)	Blas (yellow card) 32'; Coco (yellow card) 67'; Bamba (penalty missed) 70'	Report	Herrera 46'; Mbappé 65' (pen.); Dagba (yellow card) 80'; Sarabia 88'	Stadium: Stade de la Beaujoire; Attendance: 0 Referee: Hakim Ben El Hadj

8 November 2020 10	Lorient	0–2	Nantes	Lorient
15:00 CET (UTC+1)	Abergel (yellow card) 18'; Laurienté (yellow card) 19'; Morel (yellow card) 82'	Report	Louza (yellow card) 32'; Bamba 80'; Blas 84'	Stadium: Stade du Moustoir; Attendance: 0 Referee: Stéphanie Frappart

22 November 2020 11	Nantes	1–1	Metz	Nantes
13:00 CET (UTC+1)	Kolo 29'; Abeid (yellow card) 41'; Fábio (yellow card) 45+4'	Report	Leya Iseka 45+4' (pen.); Fofana (yellow card) 71'; Oukidja (yellow card) 85'; Boye (yellow card) 87'	Stadium: Stade de la Beaujoire; Attendance: 0 Referee: Benoît Millot

25 November 2020 8	Lens	1–1	Nantes	Lens
19:00 CET (UTC+1)	Kakuta 27', (yellow card) 64'; Doucouré (yellow card) 37'; Gradit (yellow card) 78'; Badé (yellow card) 85'	Report	Girotto (yellow card) 7'; Kolo (yellow card) 71'; Touré 81' (pen.)	Stadium: Stade Bollaert-Delelis; Attendance: 0 Referee: Florent Batta
Note: The match originally scheduled for 25 October, but postponed after eleven Lens players tested positive for COVID-19.

28 November 2020 12	Marseille	3–1	Nantes	Marseille
17:00 CET (UTC+1)	Thauvin 2'; Payet 35', (yellow card) 47'; Rongier (yellow card) 54'; Benedetto 60' (pen.); Álvaro (yellow card) 72'; Strootman (yellow card) 90+3'	Report	Castelletto (yellow card) 57'; Blas 73', (yellow card) 83'	Stadium: Stade Vélodrome; Attendance: 0 Referee: Mikael Lesage

6 December 2020 13	Nantes	0–4	Strasbourg	Nantes
15:00 CET (UTC+1)	Abeid (yellow card) 64'; Louza (yellow card) 67'; Corchia (yellow card) 77'	Report	Liénard 16' (pen.), (yellow card) 32'; Diallo 34'; Lala (yellow card) 62'; Ajorque 78' (pen.); Zohi 83'	Stadium: Stade de la Beaujoire; Attendance: 0 Referee: Clément Turpin

13 December 2020 14	Nantes	1–1	Dijon	Nantes
15:00 CET (UTC+1)	Simon 24' (pen.); Chirivella (yellow card) 31'; Blas (yellow card) 33'	Report	Panzo (yellow card) 22'; Konaté 54'; Scheidler (yellow card) 90+2'	Stadium: Stade de la Beaujoire; Attendance: 0 Referee: Antony Gautier

16 December 2020 15	Reims	3–2	Nantes	Reims
19:00 CET (UTC+1)	Konan (yellow card) 7'; Cassamá (yellow card) 58'; Touré 68'; Dia 72' (pen.); Cafaro 74'	Report	Fábio (yellow card) 5'; Pallois 18'; Traoré (yellow card) 72'; Blas 79'	Stadium: Stade Auguste-Delaune; Attendance: 0 Referee: Karim Abed

20 December 2020 16	Nantes	1–1	Angers	Nantes
15:00 CET (UTC+1)	Abeid (yellow card) 27'; Traoré (yellow card) 45', (goal) 90+3'; Pallois (yellow card) 62'	Report	Thomas 42'	Stadium: Stade de la Beaujoire; Attendance: 0 Referee: Willy Delajod

23 December 2020 17	Lyon	3–0	Nantes	Décines-Charpieu
21:00 CET (UTC+1)	Toko Ekambi 4'; Marcelo (yellow card) 14'; Kadewere 37'; Paquetá 44'	Report	Coco (yellow card) 34'; Abeid (yellow card) 56'; Pallois (yellow card) 68'	Stadium: Parc Olympique Lyonnais; Attendance: 0 Referee: Ruddy Buquet

6 January 2021 18	Nantes	0–0	Rennes	Nantes
19:00 CET (UTC+1)	Coulibaly (yellow card) 13'; Traoré (yellow card) 68'	Report	Grenier (yellow card) 25'; Bourigeaud (yellow card) 55'	Stadium: Stade de la Beaujoire; Attendance: 0 Referee: Jérémie Pignard

9 January 2021 19	Montpellier	1–1	Nantes	Montpellier
21:00 CET (UTC+1)	Oyongo 6'; Souquet (yellow card) 31'; Delort (yellow card) 55'; Le Tallec (yellow card) 59'; Ferri (yellow card) 73'; Congré (yellow card) 75'	Report	Louza 51'	Stadium: Stade de la Mosson; Attendance: 0 Referee: François Letexier

17 January 2021 20	Nantes	1–1	Lens	Nantes
15:00 CET (UTC+1)	Louza 36' (pen.); Kolo (yellow card) 50'; Corchia (yellow card) 67'; Touré (yellow card) 87'	Report	Kakuta (penalty missed) 33', 81'; Gradit (yellow card) 35'; Haïdara (yellow card) 69'; Fortès (yellow card) 77'	Stadium: Stade de la Beaujoire; Attendance: 0 Referee: Frank Schneider

24 January 2021 21	Metz	2–0	Nantes	Metz
15:00 CET (UTC+1)	Vagner (yellow card) 29'; Leya Iseka 35'; Sarr (yellow card) 85'; Boulaya (yellow card) 89', (goal) 90+4'	Report	Coco (yellow card) 66'	Stadium: Stade Saint-Symphorien; Attendance: 0 Referee: Jérôme Miguelgorry

31 January 2021 22	Nantes	1–2	Monaco	Nantes
21:00 CET (UTC+1)	Appiah (yellow card) 55'; Pallois (yellow card) 73' (yellow-red card) 73'; Emond 83', (yellow card) 90+2'	Report	Diatta (yellow card) 19'; Fofana (yellow card) 29'; Maripán 45'; Volland 60'; Florentino (yellow card) 90+3'	Stadium: Stade de la Beaujoire; Attendance: 0 Referee: Thomas Léonard

3 February 2021 23	Saint-Étienne	1–1	Nantes	Saint-Étienne
21:00 CET (UTC+1)	Camara 57'; Cissé (yellow card) 61'; Khazri (yellow card) 80'; Bouanga (yellow card) 89'	Report	Kolo 36'; Girotto (yellow card) 65'	Stadium: Stade Geoffroy-Guichard; Attendance: 0 Referee: Eric Wattellier

7 February 2021 24	Nantes	0–2	Lille	Nantes
17:00 CET (UTC+1)	Coco (yellow card) 29'; Corchia (yellow card) 31'; Louza (yellow card) 32'	Report	David 9', 83'	Stadium: Stade de la Beaujoire; Attendance: 0 Referee: Stéphanie Frappart

14 February 2021 25	Angers	1–3	Nantes	Angers
15:00 CET (UTC+1)	Mangani 33' (pen.); Diony (yellow card) 61'; Coulibaly (yellow card) 77'	Report	Simon 4'; Louza 7' (pen.); Lafont (yellow card) 33'; Blas (yellow card) 83'; Bamba 86'; Kolo (yellow card) 90+5'	Stadium: Stade Raymond Kopa; Attendance: 0 Referee: François Letexier

20 February 2021 26	Nantes	1–1	Marseille	Nantes
17:00 CET (UTC+1)	Traoré (yellow card) 32'; Castelletto (yellow card) 43'; Blas 50'; Chirivella (yellow card) 74'; Bamba (yellow card) 88'	Report	Payet 69'; Álvaro (yellow card) 88'; Sakai (red card) 90+4'	Stadium: Stade de la Beaujoire; Attendance: 0 Referee: Amaury Delerue

28 February 2021 27	Nîmes	1–1	Nantes	Nîmes
15:00 CET (UTC+1)	Miguel (yellow card) 5' (yellow-red card) 90+1'; Koné 76'	Report	Blas 27'; Appiah (yellow card) 58'	Stadium: Stade des Costières; Attendance: 0 Referee: Florent Batta

3 March 2021 28	Nantes	1–2	Reims	Nantes
21:00 CET (UTC+1)	Simon 14'	Report	Faes (yellow card) 6'; Konan (yellow card) 11', (goal) 39'; Cassamá (yellow card) 29'; Chavalerin (yellow card) 69'; Abdelhamid (yellow card) 80', (goal) 89'	Stadium: Stade de la Beaujoire; Attendance: 0 Referee: Willy Delajod

14 March 2021 29	Paris Saint-Germain	1–2	Nantes	Paris
21:00 CET (UTC+1)	Draxler 42'; Rafinha (yellow card) 48'; Verratti (yellow card) 67'	Report	Simon (yellow card) 45', (goal) 71'; Traoré (yellow card) 51'; Kolo Muani 59'	Stadium: Parc des Princes; Attendance: 0 Referee: Karim Abed

21 March 2021 30	Nantes	1–1	Lorient	Nantes
15:00 CET (UTC+1)	Kolo Muani 2'	Report	Laurienté (yellow card) 24', (goal) 87'	Stadium: Stade de la Beaujoire; Attendance: 0 Referee: Antony Gautier

4 April 2021 31	Nantes	1–2	Nice	Nantes
15:00 CEST (UTC+2)	Touré 32'; Pallois (yellow card) 43'	Report	Dolberg 11' (pen.), 29'; Maolida (yellow card) 61'; Benítez (yellow card) 72'	Stadium: Stade de la Beaujoire; Attendance: 0 Referee: Stéphanie Frappart

11 April 2021 32	Rennes	1–0	Nantes	Rennes
13:00 CEST (UTC+2)	Aguerd (yellow card) 19'; Da Silva (yellow card) 36'; Salin (yellow card) 41'; Guirassy (yellow card) 43'; Terrier 52'; Camavinga (yellow card) 57'; Tait (yellow card) 68'	Report	Simon (yellow card) 40'; Castelletto (yellow card) 90+2'	Stadium: Roazhon Park; Attendance: 0 Referee: Amaury Delerue

18 April 2021 33	Nantes	1–2	Lyon	Nantes
21:00 CEST (UTC+2)	Pallois 60'	Report	Depay 5', 37' (pen.); Denayer (yellow card) 67'	Stadium: Stade de la Beaujoire; Attendance: 0 Referee: Benoît Bastien

25 April 2021 34	Strasbourg	1–2	Nantes	Strasbourg
15:00 CEST (UTC+2)	Djiku (yellow card) 17'; Ajorque 43'	Report	Chirivella (yellow card) 16'; Louza (yellow card) 22'; Castelletto 53', (yellow card) 57'; Blas 76'	Stadium: Stade de la Meinau; Attendance: 0 Referee: Ruddy Buquet

2 May 2021 35	Brest	1–4	Nantes	Brest
15:00 CEST (UTC+2)	Larsonneur (yellow card) 61'; Faivre 83'; Charbonnier (yellow card) 89'	Report	Simon 15'; Blas 27'; Louza 56'; Coulibaly 62' (pen.)	Stadium: Stade Francis-Le Blé; Attendance: 0 Referee: Mikael Lesage

8 May 2021 36	Nantes	3–0	Bordeaux	Nantes
13:00 CEST (UTC+2)	Coulibaly 19'; Louza 51' (pen.); Kolo Muani 70'	Report	Mexer (yellow card) 31'; Benito (yellow card) 50'; Lacoux (yellow card) 57'; De Préville (yellow card) 74'; Bašić (yellow card) 90+1'	Stadium: Stade de la Beaujoire; Attendance: 0 Referee: Benoît Millot

16 May 2021 37	Dijon	0–4	Nantes	Dijon
21:00 CEST (UTC+2)	Marié (yellow card) 27'; Ecuele Manga (yellow card) 85'	Report	Coulibaly 6', (yellow card) 61'; Kolo Muani 32', 90+2'; Blas 90+1'	Stadium: Stade Gaston Gérard; Attendance: 0 Referee: Karim Abed

23 May 2021 38	Nantes	1–2	Montpellier	Nantes
21:00 CEST (UTC+2)	Kolo Muani 33'; Coco (yellow card) 82'; Blas (yellow card) 90+1'	Report	Hilton (yellow card) 18'; Delort (penalty missed) 29', 76'; Laborde 30'; Souquet (yellow card) 45+1'	Stadium: Stade de la Beaujoire; Attendance: 0 Referee: Ruddy Buquet

==== Relegation play-offs ====
27 May 2021 First leg	Toulouse	1–2	Nantes	Toulouse
20:45 CEST (UTC+2)	Machado 19'; Koné (yellow card) 63'; Moreira (yellow card) 72'	Report	Blas 10'; Kolo Muani 22'; Chirivella (yellow card) 46'	Stadium: Stadium de Toulouse; Attendance: 0 Referee: Jérémie Pignard

30 May 2021 Second leg	Nantes	0–1 (2 (a)–2 agg.)	Toulouse	Nantes
18:00 CEST (UTC+2)	Appiah (yellow card) 5'; Kolo Muani (yellow card) 41'; Chirivella (yellow card) 77'	Report	Bayo (yellow card) 53', (goal) 62'; Machado (yellow card) 70'; Antiste (yellow card) 81'; Ngoumou (red card) 87'	Stadium: Stade de la Beaujoire; Attendance: 0 Referee: Benoît Bastien

=== Coupe de France ===
10 February 2021 Round of 64	Nantes	2–4	Lens	Nantes
14:45 CET (UTC+1)	Basila (yellow card) 3'; Bamba 24', 63'	Report	Jean 27', 39'; Doucouré 36'; Kalimuendo 58'	Stadium: Stade de la Beaujoire; Attendance: 0 Referee: Johan Hamel

== Statistics ==
=== Goalscorers ===
As of 28 November 2020

Rank	No.	Pos	Nat	Name	Ligue 1	Coupe de France	Total
1	10	MF	(France)	Ludovic Blas	4	0	4
2	26	MF	(France)	Imran Louza	2	0	2
2	15	FW	(France)	Randal Kolo	2	0	2
2	32	FW	(France)	Kader Bamba	2	0	2
5	3	DF	(Brazil)	Andrei Girotto	1	0	1
5	19	MF	(France)	Abdoulaye Touré	1	0	1
5	27	MF	(Nigeria)	Moses Simon	1	0	1
5	28	FW	(Belgium)	Renaud Emond	1	0	1
Totals					14	0	14
