= Andrei Girotto =

Brazilian footballer (born 1992)

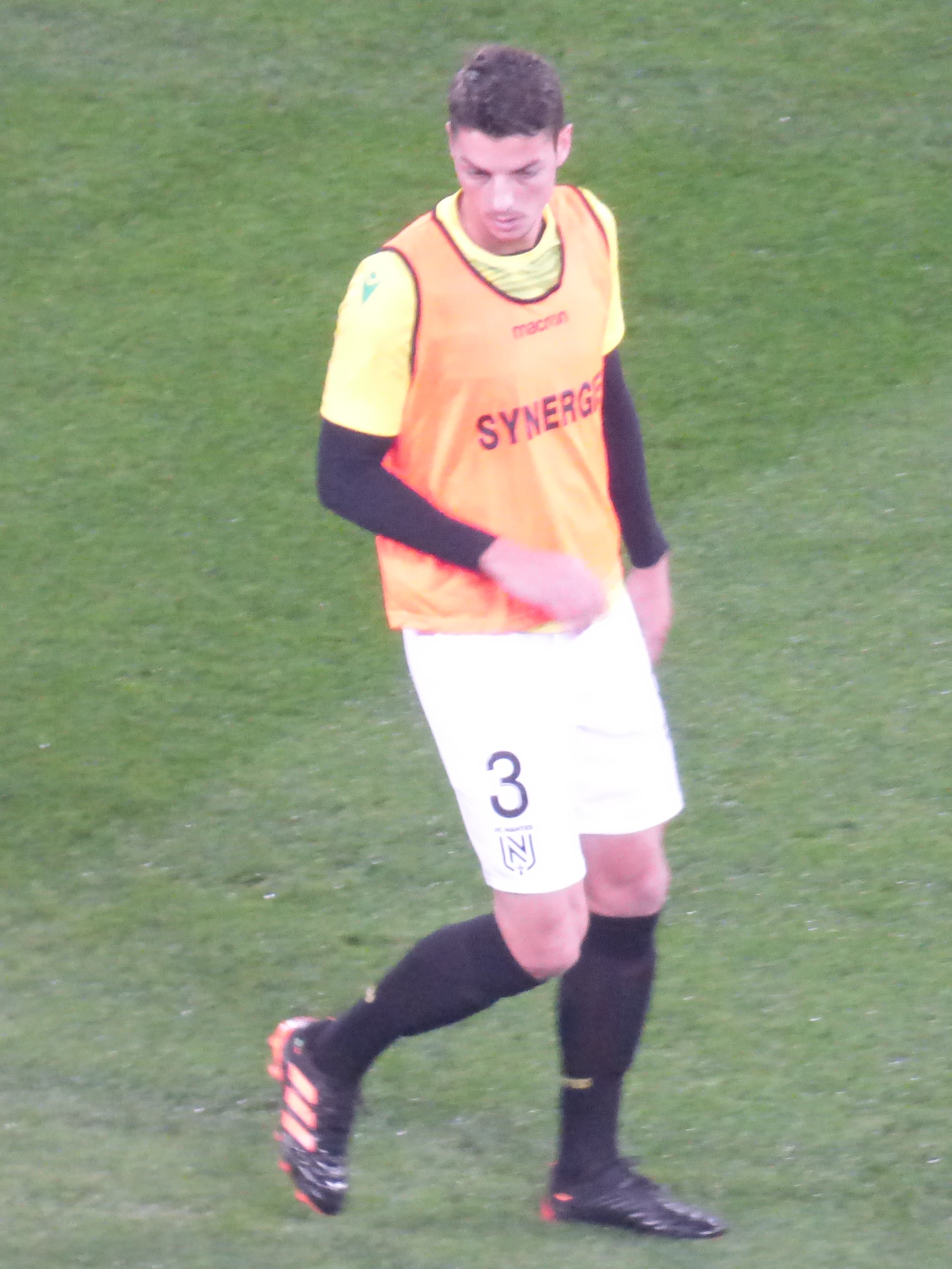
- Girotto with Nantes in 2020

Personal information
- Date of birth: 17 February 1992 (age 34)
- Place of birth: Bento Gonçalves, Brazil
- Height: 1.86 m (6 ft 1 in)
- Positions: Centre-back; defensive midfielder

Youth career
- Esportivo
- 2003–2007: Grêmio
- 2008–2009: Esportivo
- 2009: Metropolitano

Senior career*
Years	Team	Apps	(Gls)
2010–2013	Metropolitano	37	(2)
2011	→ Hercílio Luz (loan)	4	(0)
2013–2017	Tombense	0	(0)
2013–2014	→ América Mineiro (loan)	75	(9)
2015	→ Palmeiras (loan)	12	(1)
2016	→ Kyoto Sanga (loan)	38	(5)
2017	→ Chapecoense (loan)	34	(5)
2017–2023	Nantes	176	(12)
2023–2026	Al-Taawoun	79	(6)
2026–	Al Faisaly	8	(1)
- * Club domestic league appearances and goals as of 22:12, 19 October 2026 (UTC)

Andrei Girotto (born 17 February 1992) is a Brazilian professional footballer who plays as a centre-back or defensive midfielder for Saudi Pro League club Al Faisaly

== Career ==
=== Early career ===
Girotto was born in Bento Gonçalves, Rio Grande do Sul. He made his senior debut with Metropolitano in 2010. After a short loan stint at Hercílio Luz in 2011, he established himself as a starter and played key role during the 2013 Campeonato Catarinense, helping his side to qualify for the Série D.

On 26 April 2013, Girotto moved to América Mineiro, signing a contract until December 2014. He made his debut for the club on 1 June by starting in a 1–0 Série B away win against Palmeiras, and scored his first goals on 5 July after netting his team's all goals in a 2–2 home draw against Paraná.

=== Palmeiras ===
On 20 December 2014, Girotto signed a one-year contract with Série A club Palmeiras. Not registered in the 2015 Campeonato Paulista, he made his club debut on 29 April, coming on as a second-half substitute for Renato Augusto in a 1–1 away draw against Sampaio Corrêa, for the year's Copa do Brasil.

Girotto made his debut in the top tier of Brazilian football on 1 July 2015, replacing Arouca late into a 2–0 home win against Chapecoense. His first goal in the category came on 23 August, but in a 2–1 away loss against Atlético Mineiro.

On 1 October 2015, Girotto scored Palmeiras' winning goal in a 3–2 home win over Internacional, which led the club to the finals of the cup.

=== Kyoto Sanga ===
On 18 December 2015, Girotto was released by Palmeiras, and moved abroad for the first time in his career after joining Kyoto Sanga. He was an undisputed starter for the side, scoring five goals as the club missed promotion in the play-offs.

=== Chapecoense ===
On 4 January 2017, Girotto returned to Brazil and signed with Chapecoense for one season. He helped the club to win the year's Campeonato Catarinense, scoring four goals in the competition.

=== Nantes ===
On 12 August 2017, Ligue 1 club FC Nantes announced the signing of Girotto on a four-year deal. On 16 September 2017, he scored his first competitive goal for Nantes with a low shot 30 yards from goal that bent its way into the net off the right-hand post in a Ligue 1 1–0 home win over Caen.

Ahead of the 2019–20 season, Girotto was converted into a centre-back, and subsequently played regularly in that position.

=== Al-Taawoun ===
On 6 August 2023, Girotto joined Saudi Pro League club Al-Taawoun on a two-year deal. He made his club debut seven days later, also scoring his first goal in a 1–1 draw against Al-Fateh.

== Career statistics ==
As of match played 20 May 2025

Appearances and goals by club, season and competition
Club	Season	League			State League		Cup		League Cup		Continental		Other		Total	
Club	Season	Division	Apps	Goals	Apps	Goals	Apps	Goals	Apps	Goals	Apps	Goals	Apps	Goals	Apps	Goals
Metropolitano	2010	Série D	0	0	0	0	—		—		—		0	0	0	0
Metropolitano	2011	Série D	2	0	2	0	—		—		—		5 (Note: Appearance(s) in Copa Santa Catarina)	1	9	1
Metropolitano	2012	Série D	2	0	15	1	—		—		—		6	0	23	1
Metropolitano	2013	Série D	0	0	16	1	—		—		—		—		16	1
Metropolitano	Total		4	0	33	2	—		—		—		11	1	48	3
Hercílio Luz (loan)	2011	Catarinense Série B	—		4	0	—		—		—		—		4	0
América Mineiro	2013	Série B	30	4	—		2	0	—		—		—		32	4
América Mineiro	2014	Série B	34	5	11	0	3	0	—		—		—		48	5
América Mineiro	Total		64	9	11	0	5	0	—		—		—		80	9
Palmeiras	2015	Série A	12	1	—		6	1	—		—		—		18	2
Kyoto Sanga	2016	J2 League	38	5	—		0	0	—		—		—		38	5
Chapecoense	2017	Série A	17	1	17	4	2	0	—		6 (Note: Six appearances altogether in Copa Libertadores and Copa Sudamericana)	1	3 (Note: Two appearances in Recopa Sudamericana, one appearance in Primeira Liga)	0	45	6
Nantes	2017–18	Ligue 1	25	1	—		1	0	1	0	—		—		27	1
Nantes	2018–19	Ligue 1	20	2	—		3	0	2	0	—		—		25	2
Nantes	2019–20	Ligue 1	25	1	—		2	0	1	0	—		—		28	1
Nantes	2020–21	Ligue 1	34	1	—		0	0	—		—		2 (Note: Two appearances in relegation play-offs)	0	36	1
Nantes	2021–22	Ligue 1	36	6	—		5	0	—		—		—		41	6
Nantes	2022–23	Ligue 1	36	1	—		4	0	—		7 (Note: Appearance(s) in UEFA Europa League)	0	1 (Note: Appearance(s) in Trophée des Champions)	0	48	1
Nantes	Total		176	12	—		15	0	4	0	7	0	3	0	205	12
Al-Taawoun	2023–24	Saudi Pro League	28	3	—		3	0	—		—		—		31	3
Al-Taawoun	2024–25	Saudi Pro League	29	1	—		2	0	—		11 (Note: Appearance(s) in AFC Champions League)	1	1 (Note: Appearance(s) in Saudi Super Cup)	0	43	2
Al-Taawoun	Total		57	4	—		5	0	—		11	1	1	0	74	6
Career total			368	32	65	6	33	1	4	0	24	2	18	1	512	42

== Honours ==
Palmeiras

- Copa do Brasil: 2015

Chapecoense

- Campeonato Catarinense: 2017

Nantes

- Coupe de France: 2021–22
