= Moses Simon =

Nigerian footballer (born 1995)

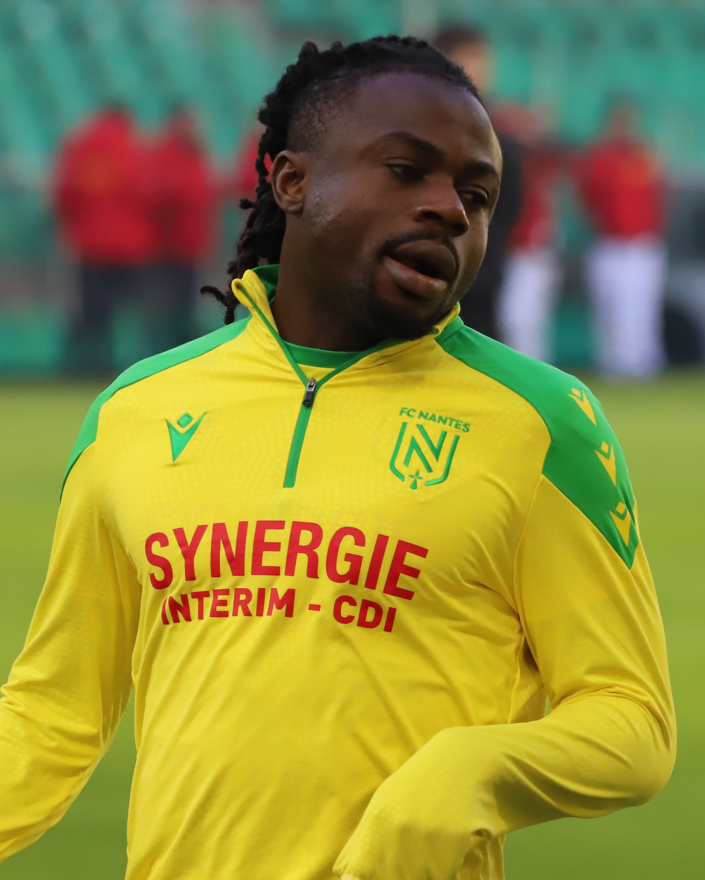
- Simon with Nantes in 2025

Personal information
- Full name: Moses Daddy-Ajala Simon
- Date of birth: 12 July 1995 (age 31)
- Place of birth: Jos, Nigeria
- Height: 1.68 m (5 ft 6 in)
- Positions: Forward; left winger

Team information
- Current team: Paris FC
- Number: 27

Youth career
- 2003–2013: GBS Academy
- 2013: Ajax

Senior career*
Years	Team	Apps	(Gls)
2014–2015	Trenčín	33	(13)
2015–2018	Gent	76	(16)
2018–2020	Levante	19	(1)
2019–2020	→ Nantes (loan)	26	(5)
2020–2025	Nantes	151	(28)
2025–	Paris FC	29	(3)

International career^{‡}
2013–2015	Nigeria U20	5	(0)
2015–	Nigeria	104	(12)
Medal record
Men's football
Representing Nigeria
Africa Cup of Nations
Runner-up	2023 Ivory Coast
Third place	2019 Egypt
Third place	2025 Morocco
- * Club domestic league appearances and goals as of 23:57, 19 May 2026 (UTC) ‡ National team caps and goals as of 18:00, 17 November 2026 (UTC)

Moses Daddy-Ajala Simon MON (born 12 July 1995) is a Nigerian professional footballer who plays as a forward or left winger for Ligue 1 club Paris FC and the Nigeria national team.

== Club career ==
=== Early career ===
Born in Jos, his father served in the Nigerian Army before his retirement. Simon is a product of the famed GBS Academy, the same football academy in Nigeria that produced the likes of Ahmed Musa. He was linked with Nigerian Premier League club Kaduna United, as many professional clubs abroad were also eager to sign him. On 10 May 2013, it was announced that Simon had signed a pre-contractual agreement with Dutch club Ajax to join them in pre-season training, having previously been linked with Liverpool and Tottenham Hotspur. He made his first appearance for Ajax on 13 July 2013 in a pre-season friendly match against De Graafschap, coming on as a substitute and scoring the third and final goal in the 64th minute of the match, in a 3–0 away win. He made a further appearance on 17 July, playing for the reserves team Jong Ajax in a pre-season friendly match against Voorschoten '97, scoring the second goal in the 5–0 home win. On 25 July 2013, it was announced that Ajax would not sign the young Nigerian, ultimately waiving him from the pre-season roster. After that announcement, discussions commenced with AS Trenčín; Ajax partner club in Slovakia, which is owned by former Ajax player Tschen La Ling.

=== AS Trenčín ===
On 13 January 2014, Simon signed a three-year contract with the Slovak side Trenčín. He would join his compatriot Kingsley Madu. He made his league debut in a 1–1 draw against MFK Košice starting on the right wing alongside Gino van Kessel who was on loan from Ajax. He made his club international debut during the Trenčín's 2014–15 UEFA Europa League campaign, when he was introduced during the second preliminary round of the competition, in the home match against Vojvodina Novi Sad from Serbia (played at the stadium in Dubnica, Slovakia). Simon scored a hat trick on his debut in the 4–0 win at home. AS Trenčín would eventually get eliminated in the following round, drawing at home, and falling 2–1 away against Hull City.

In October 2014 ESPN sports prepared a scouting report on Moses Simon and the report linked the winger with a move to Liverpool, Tottenham Hotspur, Hull City along with a potential return to Ajax. The situation evolved into a bidding war between Dutch club Heerenveen and Gent, with the later contractually securing the winger for three years.

=== Gent ===
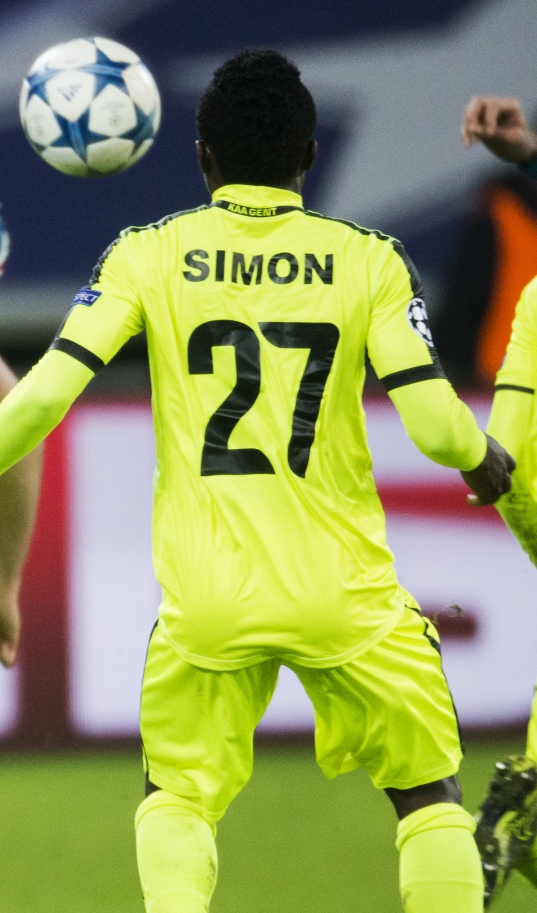
Simon with KAA Gent, 2015

On 6 January 2015, it was announced that Gent had signed Moses Simon to a three-year contract. He made his debut for Gent on 17 January 2015 in a 3–1 win against Royal Mouscron-Péruwelz in league play. His second appearance occurred four days later in a 1–0 home win against Lokeren in the Belgian Cup, in which Simon was sent off 30 seconds after he entered the field. In his third league game, again versus Sporting Lokeren, Simon scored a hat trick after which he was named Belgian league player of the week. He quickly became a key player in coach Hein Vanhaezebrouck's formation and helped Gent win their first ever national Championship title in May 2015. Two months later, Simon assisted Laurent Depoitre's winning goal in the 2015 Belgian Super Cup against cup winners Club Brugge.

=== Levante ===
On 6 August 2018, Simon joined Spanish La Liga side Levante on a five-year contract. In March 2019 he said he was glad to be playing for the team.

=== Nantes ===
On 15 August 2019, Simon was loaned out to Ligue 1 club Nantes. At the end of the season, Nantes triggered the option to buy in Simon's loan. He signed a four-year contract with the club.

On 22 December 2023, Simon extended his contract with Nantes until 2026. On 17 May 2025, he marked his 200th appearance for the club by scoring a goal in a 3–0 win against Montpellier.

=== Paris FC ===
On 25 June 2025, Simon completed a permanent move to newly promoted Ligue 1 side Paris FC, signing a three-year contract. The transfer fee was reported at approximately €7 million.

== International career ==
Simon received his first call-up to the Nigeria national team by coach Daniel Amokachi in March 2015 and made his debut on the 25th of the same month in an international friendly against Uganda, when he replaced Anthony Ujah after 59 minutes in the game. Simon scored his first goal for Nigeria in an international friendly against Niger on 8 September 2015, the second in a 2–0 win. He was selected by Nigeria for their 35-man provisional squad for the 2016 Summer Olympics.

In May 2018, he was named in Nigeria's preliminary 30-man squad for the 2018 World Cup in Russia. However, he did not make the final 23 due to injury. He was included in the country's 23-man squad for the 2019 Africa Cup of Nations.

On 11 December 2025, Simon was called up to the Nigeria squad for the 2025 Africa Cup of Nations. On 25 September 2026, he made his 100th international appearance in a 2–1 victory over Madagascar during the 2027 AFCON qualification.

== Career statistics ==
=== Club ===
As of match played 17 May 2026

Appearances and goals by club, season and competition
Club	Season	League			National cup (Note: Includes Slovak Cup, Belgian Cup, Copa del Rey, Coupe de France)		Continental		Other		Total	
Club	Season	Division	Apps	Goals	Apps	Goals	Apps	Goals	Apps	Goals	Apps	Goals
Trenčín	2013–14	Slovak Super Liga	14	7	—		—		—		14	7
Trenčín	2014–15	Slovak Super Liga	19	6	2	1	4 (Note: Appearances in UEFA Europa League)	3	—		25	10
Trenčín	Total		33	13	2	1	4	3	—		39	17
Gent	2014–15	Belgian Pro League	9	6	3	0	—		8 (Note: Appearances in Belgian Pro League European play-offs)	1	20	7
Gent	2015–16	Belgian Pro League	24	2	3	0	5 (Note: Appearances in UEFA Champions League)	0	9 (Note: Eight appearances and one goal in Belgian Pro League European play-offs, one appearance in Belgian Super Cup)	1	41	3
Gent	2016–17	Belgian Pro League	23	3	2	0	10	0	7	2	42	5
Gent	2017–18	Belgian Pro League	20	5	2	0	2	0	9	1	33	6
Gent	Total		76	16	10	0	17	0	33	5	136	21
Levante	2018–19	La Liga	19	1	4	0	—		—		23	1
Nantes (loan)	2019–20	Ligue 1	26	5	2	1	—		2 (Note: Appearances in Coupe de la Ligue)	3	30	9
Nantes	2020–21	Ligue 1	33	6	1	0	—		2 (Note: Appearances in Ligue 1 relegation/promotion play-offs)	0	36	6
Nantes	2021–22	Ligue 1	30	6	4	0	—		—		34	6
Nantes	2022–23	Ligue 1	34	5	3	0	8	0	1 (Note: Appearance in Trophée des Champions)	0	46	5
Nantes	2023–24	Ligue 1	22	3	0	0	—		—		22	3
Nantes	2024–25	Ligue 1	32	8	1	0	—		—		33	8
Nantes	Nantes total		177	33	11	1	8	0	5	3	201	37
Paris FC	2025–26	Ligue 1	29	3	0	0	—		—		29	3
Career total			334	66	27	2	29	3	38	8	428	79

=== International ===
As of match played 17 November 2026

Appearances and goals by national team and year
National team	Year	Apps	Goals
Nigeria	2015	8	3
Nigeria	2016	5	0
Nigeria	2017	5	1
Nigeria	2018	3	0
Nigeria	2019	12	1
Nigeria	2020	2	0
Nigeria	2021	8	0
Nigeria	2022	12	2
Nigeria	2023	7	2
Nigeria	2024	15	0
Nigeria	2025	14	1
Nigeria	2026	13	2
Total		104	12

As of match played 31 March 2026
Scores and results list Nigeria's goal tally first, score column indicates score after each Simon goal.

List of international goals scored by Moses Simon
No.	Date	Venue	Cap	Opponent	Score	Result	Competition
1	8 September 2015	Adokiye Amiesimaka Stadium, Port Harcourt, Nigeria	4	Niger	2–0	2–0	Friendly
2	11 October 2015	Edmond Machtens Stadium, Brussels, Belgium	6	Cameroon	2–0	3–0	Friendly
3	17 November 2015	Adokiye Amiesimaka Stadium, Port Harcourt, Nigeria	8	Swaziland	1–0	2–0	2018 FIFA World Cup qualification
4	4 September 2017	Stade Ahmadou Ahidjo, Yaoundé, Cameroon	17	Cameroon	1–0	1–1	2018 FIFA World Cup qualification
5	21 March 2019	Stephen Keshi Stadium, Asaba, Nigeria	22	Seychelles	3–1	3–1	2019 Africa Cup of Nations qualification
6	15 January 2022	Roumdé Adjia Stadium, Garoua, Cameroon	45	Sudan	3–0	3–1	2021 Africa Cup of Nations
7	13 June 2022	Stade Adrar, Agadir, Morocco	53	São Tomé and Príncipe	2–0	10–0	2023 Africa Cup of Nations qualification
8	27 March 2023	Estádio 24 de Setembro, Bissau, Guinea Bissau	57	Guinea-Bissau	1–0	1–0	2023 Africa Cup of Nations qualification
9	16 October 2023	Estádio Municipal de Portimão, Portimão, Portugal	60	Mozambique	3–1	3–2	Friendly
10	31 May 2025	Brentford Community Stadium, London, England	81	Jamaica	1–0	2–2 (5–4 p)	2025 Unity Cup
11	27 March 2026	Mardan Sports Complex, Antalya, Turkey	96	Iran	1–0	2–1	2026 Jordan International Tournament
12	31 March 2026	Mardan Sports Complex, Antalya, Turkey	97	Jordan	1–1	2–2	2026 Jordan International Tournament

== Honours ==
Gent

- Belgian Pro League: 2014–15
- Belgian Super Cup: 2015

Nantes

- Coupe de France: 2021–22

Nigeria

- Africa Cup of Nations runner-up: 2023; third place: 2019, 2025
- Unity Cup: 2025

Orders

- Member of the Order of the Niger
