= Denis Petrić =

Slovenian footballer (born 1988)

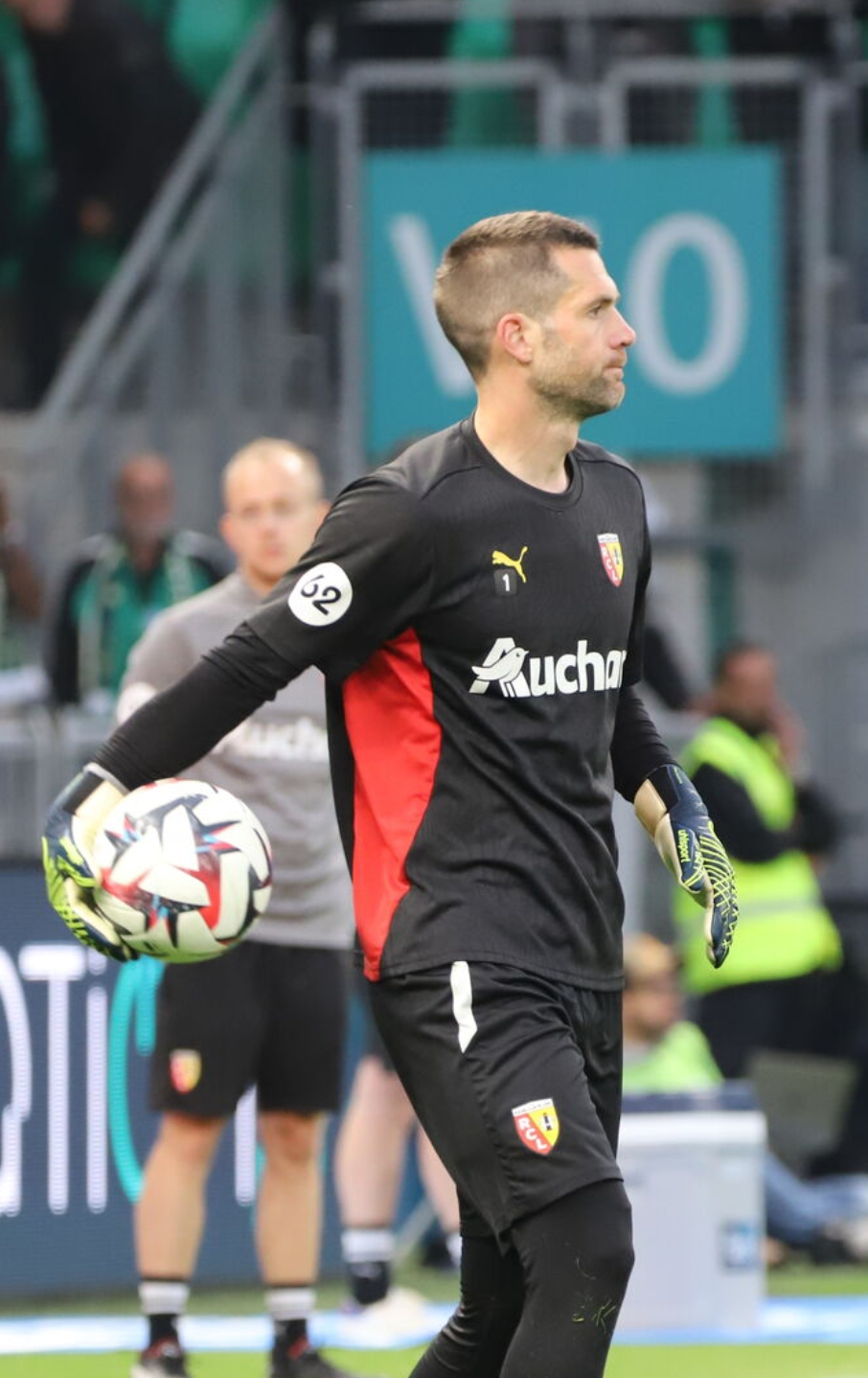
- Petrić with Lens in 2024

Personal information
- Date of birth: 24 May 1988 (age 38)
- Place of birth: Ljubljana, SR Slovenia, Yugoslavia
- Height: 1.87 m (6 ft 2 in)
- Position: Goalkeeper

Youth career
- Svoboda

Senior career*
Years	Team	Apps	(Gls)
2004–2010	Auxerre	0	(0)
2009–2010	→ Cassis Carnoux (loan)	16	(0)
2010–2013	Istres	90	(0)
2013–2015	Troyes	67	(0)
2016–2017	Angers	11	(0)
2017–2019	Guingamp	0	(0)
2019–2024	Nantes	2	(0)
2024–2025	Lens	0	(0)

International career
2004	Slovenia U17	3	(0)
2006	Slovenia U18	3	(0)
2006	Slovenia U19	3	(0)
2007	Slovenia U20	1	(0)
2007	Slovenia U21	1	(0)
2009	Serbia U21	0	(0)
- * Club domestic league appearances and goals as of 17 May 2025

Denis Petrić (Serbian Cyrillic: Денис Петрић, pronounced [dêːnis pěːtritɕ]; born 24 May 1988) is a retired professional footballer who played as a goalkeeper.

== Club career ==
In 2016 Petrić joined Ligue 1 club Angers.

== International career ==
Petrić was born and raised in Slovenia, and played for their youth teams before switching to the Serbia U21 team. He has not made a senior appearance and is eligible for either the Slovenian or Serbian national teams.

== Career statistics ==
As of match played 13 August 2023

Appearances and goals by club, season and competition
Club	Season	League			National cup (Note: Includes Coupe de France, FA Cup)		League cup (Note: Includes Coupe de la Ligue, EFL Cup)		Continental		Other		Total	
Club	Season	Division	Apps	Goals	Apps	Goals	Apps	Goals	Apps	Goals	Apps	Goals	Apps	Goals
Auxerre	2006–07	Ligue 1	0	0	0	0	—		—		—		0	0
Auxerre	2007–08	Ligue 1	0	0	0	0	0	0	—		—		0	0
Auxerre	2008–09	Ligue 1	0	0	0	0	0	0	—		—		0	0
Auxerre	Total		0	0	0	0	0	0	—		—		0	0
Cassis Carnoux (loan)	2009–10	National	16	0	1	0	—		—		—		17	0
Istres	2010–11	Ligue 2	25	0	0	0	0	0	—		—		25	0
Istres	2011–12	Ligue 2	29	0	0	0	2	0	—		—		31	0
Istres	2012–13	Ligue 2	35	0	0	0	0	0	—		—		35	0
Istres	2013–14	Ligue 2	1	0	—		0	0	—		—		1	0
Istres	Total		90	0	0	0	2	0	—		—		92	0
Troyes	2013–14	Ligue 2	21	0	0	0	4	0	—		—		25	0
Troyes	2014–15	Ligue 2	37	0	0	0	2	0	—		—		39	0
Troyes	2015–16	Ligue 1	9	0	—		0	0	—		—		9	0
Troyes	Total		67	0	0	0	6	0	—		—		73	0
Angers	2015–16	Ligue 1	2	0	1	0	—		—		—		3	0
Angers	2016–17	Ligue 1	9	0	0	0	1	0	—		—		10	0
Angers	Total		11	0	1	0	1	0	—		—		13	0
Guingamp	2017–18	Ligue 1	0	0	0	0	1	0	—		—		1	0
Guingamp	2018–19	Ligue 1	0	0	0	0	0	0	—		—		0	0
Guingamp	Total		0	0	0	0	1	0	—		—		1	0
Nantes	2019–20	Ligue 1	1	0	0	0	0	0	—		—		1	0
Nantes	2020–21	Ligue 1	0	0	1	0	—		—		0	0	1	0
Nantes	2021–22	Ligue 1	0	0	0	0	—		—		—		0	0
Nantes	2022–23	Ligue 1	0	0	0	0	—		0	0	0	0	0	0
Nantes	2023–24	Ligue 1	1	0	0	0	—		0	0	—		1	0
Nantes	Total		2	0	1	0	0	0	0	0	0	0	3	0
Career total			186	0	3	0	10	0	0	0	0	0	199	0

== Honours ==
Troyes

- Ligue 2: 2014–15

Angers

- Coupe de France runner-up: 2016–17

Guingamp

- Coupe de la Ligue runner-up: 2018–19

Individual

- Ligue 2 Goalkeeper of the Year: 2015
- Ligue 2 UNFP Team of the Year: 2014–15
