= Percy Prado =

Peruvian footballer (born 1996)

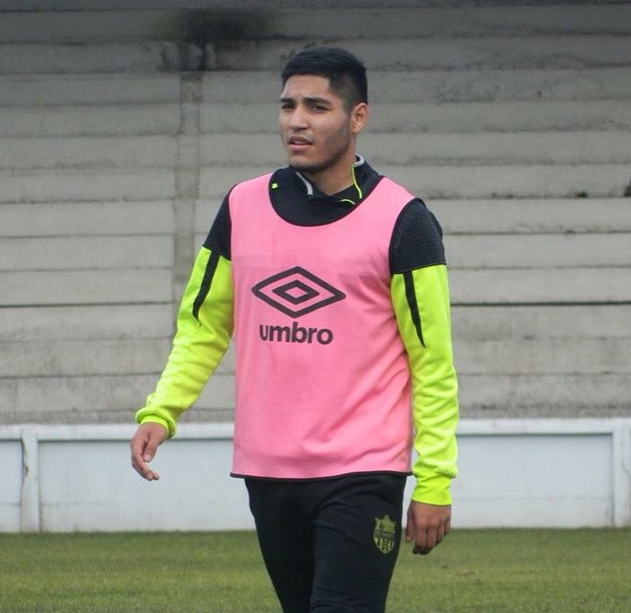
- Prado training with Nantes in 2015

Personal information
- Full name: Percy Prado Ruiz
- Date of birth: 14 January 1996 (age 30)
- Place of birth: Mirones, Lima, Peru
- Height: 1.73 m (5 ft 8 in)
- Position: Right-back

Team information
- Current team: Sporting Cristal

Youth career
- 2000–2014: Nantes

Senior career*
Years	Team	Apps	(Gls)
2014–2020	Nantes II	124	(0)
2020–2021	Nantes	3	(0)
2021–2022	Sporting Cristal	5	(0)
- * Club domestic league appearances and goals as of 15:57, 13 January 2021 (UTC)

Percy Prado Ruiz (born 14 January 1996) is a Peruvian professional footballer who plays as a right-back.

== Professional career ==
Born in Lima, Peru, Prado emigrated to France at the age of 4, and joined the youth academy of FC Nantes at the age of 6. He made his professional debut with in an 8–0 Coupe de la Ligue win over Paris FC on 30 October 2019.
