= Randal Kolo Muani =

French footballer (born 1998)

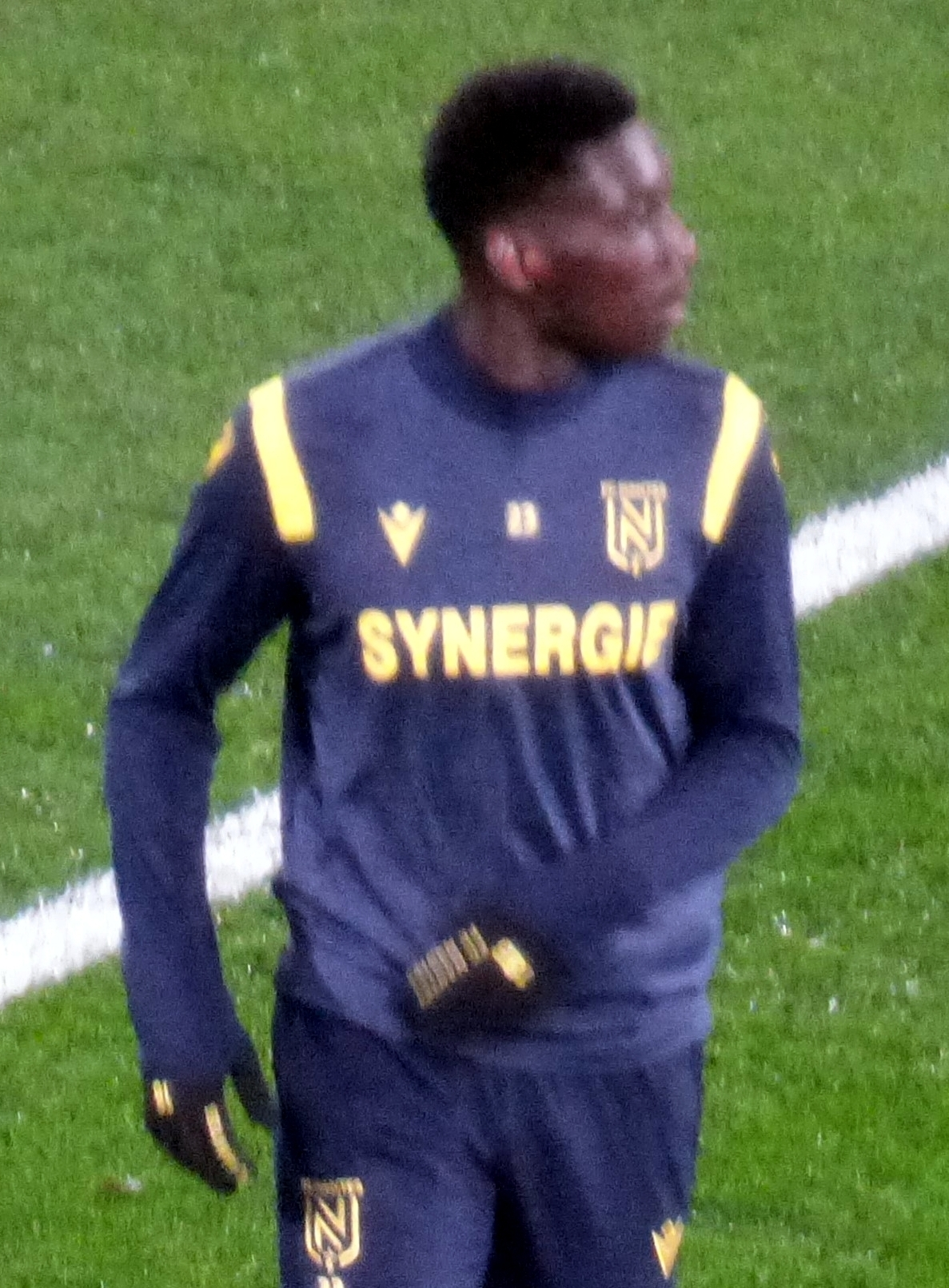
- Kolo Muani with Nantes in 2020

Personal information
- Full name: Randal Kolo Muani
- Date of birth: 5 December 1998 (age 27)
- Place of birth: Bondy, France
- Height: 1.87 m (6 ft 2 in)
- Position: Striker

Team information
- Current team: Juventus
- Number: 9

Youth career
- 2005–2010: Villepinte FC
- 2010–2011: Tremblay FC
- 2011–2015: Torcy
- 2015–2018: Nantes

Senior career*
Years	Team	Apps	(Gls)
2016–2020	Nantes B	62	(19)
2018–2022	Nantes	79	(21)
2019–2020	→ Boulogne (loan)	14	(3)
2022–2023	Eintracht Frankfurt	34	(16)
2023–2026	Paris Saint-Germain	36	(8)
2025	→ Juventus (loan)	16	(8)
2025–2026	→ Tottenham Hotspur (loan)	30	(1)
2026–	Juventus	12	(2)

International career^{‡}
2020–2021	France U21	7	(1)
2021	France Olympic	4	(1)
2022–	France	32	(9)
Medal record
Men's football
Representing France
FIFA World Cup
Runner-up	2022 Qatar
UEFA European Championship
Third place	UEFA Euro 2024
UEFA Nations League
Third place	2025 Germany
- * Club domestic league appearances and goals as of 21:17, 22 November 2026 (UTC) ‡ National team caps and goals as of 23:51, 29 March 2026 (UTC)

Randal Kolo Muani (born 5 December 1998) is a French professional footballer who plays as a striker for Serie A club Juventus and the France national team.

Kolo Muani began his professional career at Nantes, where he scored 23 goals in 87 first-team appearances and won the Coupe de France. In 2022, he joined German club Eintracht Frankfurt on a free transfer. He went on to score 26 goals in 50 matches in one year at the club before returning to France with Paris Saint-Germain in a €75 million deal.

Kolo Muani played youth international football for France at under-21 and Olympic levels. He made his senior international debut in September 2022, and was a member of the France squad that were runners-up at the 2022 FIFA World Cup.

== Early life ==
Randal Kolo Muani was born on 5 December 1998 in Bondy, Seine-Saint-Denis, to parents born in Kinshasa, Democratic Republic of Congo. He holds both French and Congolese nationalities. He acquired French nationality on 3 September 2008, through the effect of his parents' naturalization.

== Club career ==
=== Nantes ===
In his childhood, Kolo Muani played for several Parisian teams, including Villepinte, Tremblay and Torcy. During the same period, he also trained with Italian teams Vicenza and Cremonese, before joining Nantes' youth academy in 2015. Kolo Muani received his first call-up to the Nantes first team on 12 February 2017, for a match against Marseille and on 4 June 2018, he signed his first professional contract with his childhood club, Nantes. He made his professional debut in a 3–0 Ligue 1 loss to Saint-Étienne on 30 November 2018. On 21 January 2019, he made his first start in a 1–0 loss to Angers.

In August 2019, Kolo Muani joined Boulogne on a season-long loan deal. On 30 August, he made his first appearance with the club in a Championnat National match against Avranches, and he scored his first goal for the club on 21 February 2020. At Boulogne, he demonstrated his talents and contributed three goals and five assists, helping the club reach third place in the standings in the tournament, which ended prematurely due to the COVID-19 pandemic.

Kolo Muani returned to Nantes for the 2020–21 season and scored his first goal for Les Canaris in a 3–1 win against Brest. He scored 9 goals and provided as many assists in 37 league appearances, but the club had a challenging season and finished in seventeenth place. As a result, they landed in the Ligue 1 relegation/promotion play-offs against Toulouse, winners of the Ligue 2 play-offs. During the play-offs, Kolo Muani scored one goal in two matches, helping Nantes avoid relegation. During the following season, he won his first trophy with the club, the 2021–22 Coupe de France.

=== Eintracht Frankfurt ===
On 4 March 2022, Bundesliga club Eintracht Frankfurt signed Kolo Muani on a pre-contract agreement ahead of the expiration of his Nantes contract. He signed a five-year deal with the club. On 26 October 2022, he scored his first UEFA Champions League goal in a 2–1 win over Marseille, and on 1 November, he scored the winning goal in a 2–1 away victory over Sporting CP, securing his club's qualification to the knockout phase for the first time in the Champions League era.

On 7 February 2023, Kolo Muani scored his first double in the DFB-Pokal in a 4–2 home victory over Darmstadt. Eleven days later, he scored his 10th goal in the Bundesliga against Werder Bremen. On 4 April, he scored a brace in 93 seconds in a 2–0 win over Union Berlin in the DFB-Pokal quarter-finals. In his first season in the Bundesliga, Kolo Muani scored 15 goals and provided 11 assists, which made him the league's third-highest scorer and second-highest assister.

On 29 August 2023, in an interview with Sky Germany, Kolo Muani publicly revealed that Ligue 1 club Paris Saint-Germain (PSG) had made a "record offer" to sign him, and stated that he would "like to move to Paris", having informed Eintracht Frankfurt directors of his desire to leave the club. He subsequently refused to train with Frankfurt, and was left out of the team's squad for a match against Levski Sofia. Sporting director Markus Krösche condemned Kolo Muani's behavior, saying that it would have "no influence on transfer business".

=== Paris Saint-Germain ===
On 1 September 2023, Ligue 1 club Paris Saint-Germain signed Kolo Muani for €75 million, with an additional €15 million in potential bonuses. He joined the club on a five-year contract.

On 15 September, Kolo Muani made his PSG debut as a substitute in a 3–2 defeat to Nice, assisting Kylian Mbappé's second goal of the match. He made his Champions League debut and first start for the club in a 2–0 win over Borussia Dortmund four days later. On 24 September, Kolo Muani scored his first goal for PSG in a 4–0 win over Le Classique rivals Marseille; he also assisted Gonçalo Ramos's second goal in the same match. On 25 October, Kolo Muani scored his first Champions League goal for PSG in a 3–0 win over AC Milan. By the end of the season, he had scored nine goals and provided six assists in 40 games for PSG, contributing to successes in Ligue 1, the Coupe de France, and the Trophée des Champions. Most observers concluded that he had an underwhelming campaign, with Kolo Muani himself saying that he wished to "quickly forget" his first season with PSG.

==== Loan to Juventus ====
On 23 January 2025, Kolo Muani was loaned to Serie A club Juventus until the end of the season. The club announced it had signed him for a €1 million fee with €2.6 million in additional costs, plus potential bonuses adding up to €2 million.

On 25 January, Kolo Muani made his Juventus debut in a 2–1 defeat to Napoli, scoring the only Juventus goal. On 2 February, he scored a brace in a 4–1 win against Empoli at the Juventus Stadium. On 7 February, he scored another brace in a 2–1 away victory against Como, and by finding the net in his first three Serie A games, he matched a feat last achieved for the club by Roberto Baggio in 1990.

==== Loan to Tottenham ====
On 1 September 2025, Kolo Muani joined Tottenham Hotspur on loan for the rest of the season. He made his first appearance for the club on 16 September as a 77th-minute substitute in a 1–0 Champions League home win against Villarreal. However, in the following week, he suffered a dead leg following a training session collision with teammate Pape Matar Sarr. He returned to training in October, soon after playing 45 minutes in a behind-closed-doors friendly against Watford on 10 October. Kolo Muani made his return and first Premier League appearance on 19 October as a 79th-minute substitute in Tottenham's 1–2 loss to Aston Villa. Kolo Muani made his first Premier League start the following week on 26 October, in Tottenham's 3–0 away win at Everton.

Kolo Muani provide his first assist for Tottenham on 4 November in a 4–0 Champions League home win against Copenhagen for compatriot Wilson Odobert. He fractured his jaw on 8 November following a collision with Harry Maguire in a home draw against Manchester United, requiring him to play wearing a specialised mask for a short period of time. Kolo Muani scored his first two goals for Tottenham in a 5–3 Champions League loss to his parent club PSG on 26 November. On 22 February 2026, he scored his first Premier League goal in a 1–4 defeat against Arsenal in the North London derby.

=== Return to Juventus ===
On 2 August 2026, Kolo Muani returned to Juventus on a permanent transfer. A fee of €38 million, with up to €12 million in bonuses, was disclosed by Juventus in the official statement.

== International career ==
Kolo Muani was a youth international for France. He played matches for his country's under-21 and Olympic national teams.

On 15 September 2022, Kolo Muani received his first call-up to the senior France national team for two UEFA Nations League matches. On 16 November 2022, he replaced Christopher Nkunku in France's FIFA World Cup squad after the latter was forced to withdraw due to injury. On 14 December, Kolo Muani scored his first goal for France, in the semi-final match against Morocco, slotting in a deflected shot from Kylian Mbappé. He also became the third fastest player to score a goal as a substitute in the World Cup, after 44 seconds, only behind Richard Morales and Ebbe Sand.

In the final against Argentina, he won a penalty which was converted into a goal by Kylian Mbappé, then scored in the penalty shootout which ended in a 4–2 defeat. During the match, in the 123rd minute and into the final stoppage time before penalties, Kolo Muani had an opportunity to score the go-ahead goal and potentially win the World Cup for France, but it was saved by Emiliano Martínez in what has been described as the "new 'Save of the Century'". In February 2023, Kolo Muani recalled the moment by saying, "I could have lobbed him, I could have given the ball to Kylian [Mbappé], but in the moment, I didn't see him. After when you see the video, you see that there were other options, but it's too late, you cannot do anything. I still have it in my throat and it'll be there for life."

On 21 November 2023, Kolo Muani scored his first goal for France after the 2022 World Cup in a 2–2 draw away to Greece in UEFA Euro 2024 qualifying. On 17 May 2024, he was included in France's squad for UEFA Euro 2024. In the round of 16 against Belgium on 1 July, Kolo Muani provoked an own goal after his shot was deflected into the Belgian net by Jan Vertonghen, securing a 1–0 victory that put France in the quarter-finals. On 9 July in the semi-finals, Kolo Muani scored the opening goal in a 2–1 defeat to Spain, a header assisted by a cross from Mbappé. On 14 October, Kolo Muani scored his first international brace in a 2–1 win over Belgium in the UEFA Nations League. He finished 2024 as France's top scorer with six goals to his name.

== Player profile ==
=== Style of play ===
Kolo Muani's playing style has drawn comparisons to the legendary French striker Thierry Henry. Like Henry, Kolo Muani began his career as a wide player known for his pace and trickery, but eventually transitioned into a center-forward position. Both players have a similar height of around 6'2" and possess rangy physiques. Kolo Muani's languid dribbling style and impressive speed are also reminiscent of Henry's style of play, particularly during his younger days. He has a remarkable strength on the ball and a playful approach to the game that can leave defenders trailing behind him.

France national team coach, Didier Deschamps, acknowledged Kolo Muani's many qualities, describing him as a player who has a significant presence, runs in behind from deep, and has a good finishing ability.

Frankfurt's head coach, Oliver Glasner, praised Kolo Muani's speed, tackling, dribbling, and finishing skills, noting that he is an asset to the team.

Markus Krösche, Eintracht Frankfurt's board member for sport, expressed his excitement for Kolo Muani's potential, stating that his speed, robustness, finishing skills, and tactical versatility are qualities that the team needs. He further noted that Kolo Muani's potential had attracted the interest of many clubs, and the team is delighted that he has chosen to take his next steps with them.

== Career statistics ==
=== Club ===
As of match played 22 November 2026

Appearances and goals by club, season and competition
Club	Season	League			National cup (Note: Includes Coupe de France, DFB-Pokal, Coppa Italia, FA Cup)		League cup (Note: Includes EFL Cup)		Europe		Other		Total	
Club	Season	Division	Apps	Goals	Apps	Goals	Apps	Goals	Apps	Goals	Apps	Goals	Apps	Goals
Nantes B	2015–16	CFA	1	0	—		—		—		—		1	0
Nantes B	2016–17	CFA	21	8	—		—		—		—		21	8
Nantes B	2017–18	Championnat National 3	21	6	—		—		—		—		21	6
Nantes B	2018–19	Championnat National 2	17	5	—		—		—		—		17	5
Nantes B	2019–20	Championnat National 2	1	0	—		—		—		—		1	0
Nantes B	2020–21	Championnat National 2	1	0	—		—		—		—		1	0
Nantes B	Total		62	19	—		—		—		—		62	19
Nantes	2018–19	Ligue 1	6	0	0	0	0	0	—		—		6	0
Nantes	2020–21	Ligue 1	37	9	1	0	—		—		2 (Note: Appearances in Ligue 1 relegation/promotion play-offs)	1	40	10
Nantes	2021–22	Ligue 1	36	12	5	1	—		—		—		41	13
Nantes	Total		79	21	6	1	0	0	—		2	1	87	23
Boulogne (loan)	2019–20	Championnat National	14	3	1	0	0	0	—		—		15	3
Eintracht Frankfurt	2022–23	Bundesliga	32	15	6	6	—		7 (Note: Appearances in UEFA Champions League)	2	1 (Note: Appearance in UEFA Super Cup)	0	46	23
Eintracht Frankfurt	2023–24	Bundesliga	2	1	1	1	—		1 (Note: Appearance in UEFA Europa Conference League)	1	—		4	3
Eintracht Frankfurt	Total		34	16	7	7	—		8	3	1	0	50	26
Paris Saint-Germain	2023–24	Ligue 1	26	6	3	2	—		10	1	1 (Note: Appearance in Trophée des Champions)	0	40	9
Paris Saint-Germain	2024–25	Ligue 1	10	2	0	0	—		4	0	0	0	14	2
Paris Saint-Germain	Total		36	8	3	2	—		14	1	1	0	54	11
Juventus (loan)	2024–25	Serie A	16	8	1	0	—		2	0	3 (Note: Appearances in FIFA Club World Cup)	2	22	10
Tottenham Hotspur (loan)	2025–26	Premier League	30	1	1	0	1	0	9	4	—		41	5
Juventus	2026–27	Serie A	12	2	0	0	—		4 (Note: Appearances in UEFA Europa League)	3	—		16	5
Career total			283	76	19	10	1	0	37	11	7	3	347	100

=== International ===
As of match played 29 March 2026

Appearances and goals by national team and year
National team	Year	Apps	Goals
France	2022	5	1
France	2023	8	1
France	2024	14	6
France	2025	4	1
France	2026	1	0
Total		32	9

As of match played 5 June 2025
France score listed first, score column indicates score after each Kolo Muani goal.

List of international goals scored by Randal Kolo Muani
No.	Date	Venue	Cap	Opponent	Score	Result	Competition	Ref.
1	14 December 2022	Al Bayt Stadium, Al Khor, Qatar	4	Morocco	2–0	2–0	2022 FIFA World Cup	
2	21 November 2023	Agia Sophia Stadium, Athens, Greece	13	Greece	1–0	2–2	UEFA Euro 2024 qualifying	
3	26 March 2024	Stade Vélodrome, Marseille, France	15	Chile	2–1	3–2	Friendly	
4	5 June 2024	Stade Saint-Symphorien, Longeville-lès-Metz, France	16	Luxembourg	1–0	3–0	Friendly	
5	9 July 2024	Allianz Arena, Munich, Germany	22	Spain	1–0	1–2	UEFA Euro 2024	
6	9 September 2024	Parc Olympique Lyonnais, Lyon, France	23	Belgium	1–0	2–0	2024–25 UEFA Nations League A	
7	14 October 2024	King Baudouin Stadium, Brussels, Belgium	25	Belgium	1–0	2–1	2024–25 UEFA Nations League A	
8	14 October 2024	King Baudouin Stadium, Brussels, Belgium	25	Belgium	2–1	2–1	2024–25 UEFA Nations League A	
9	5 June 2025	MHPArena, Stuttgart, Germany	30	Spain	4–5	4–5	2025 UEFA Nations League Finals	

== Honours ==
Nantes

- Coupe de France: 2021–22

Eintracht Frankfurt

- DFB-Pokal runner-up: 2022–23

Paris Saint-Germain

- Ligue 1: 2023–24, 2024–25
- Coupe de France: 2023–24
- Trophée des Champions: 2023

France

- FIFA World Cup runner-up: 2022
- UEFA Nations League third place: 2024–25

Individual

- Bundesliga Team of the Season: 2022–23
- DFB-Pokal top scorer: 2022–23
- VDV Team of the Season: 2022–23
- VDV Newcomer of the Season (Silver Boot): 2022–23
- Serie A Player of the Month: February 2025
