= Charles Traoré =

Malian footballer (born 1992)

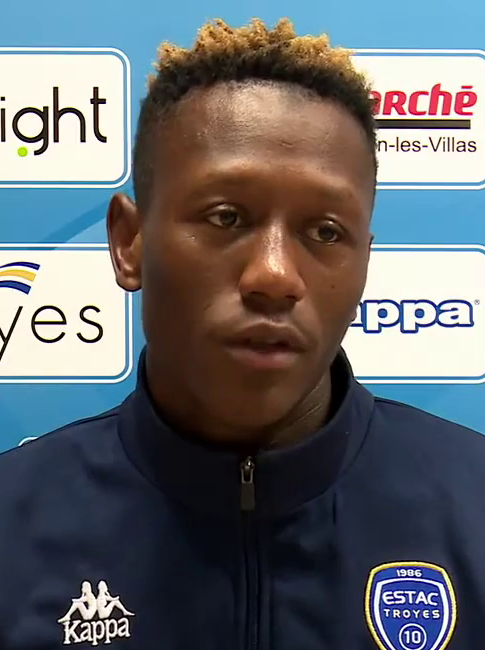
- Traoré with Troyes in 2016

Personal information
- Full name: Charles Blonda Traoré
- Date of birth: 1 January 1992 (age 34)
- Place of birth: Bamako, Mali
- Height: 1.80 m (5 ft 11 in)
- Position: Left-back

Youth career
- 2011–2013: FC Aulnaysien
- 2013–2014: FC Azzurri 90 Lausanne
- 2014–2015: Nantes

Senior career*
Years	Team	Apps	(Gls)
2015–2016	Troyes II	11	(1)
2015–2018	Troyes	60	(1)
2018–2023	Nantes	83	(1)
2022–2023	Nantes II	3	(0)
2023–2025	Bastia	12	(0)
2024	Bastia II	1	(0)

International career^{‡}
2016–	Mali	10	(0)
- * Club domestic league appearances and goals as of 6 December 2024 ‡ National team caps and goals as of 11:16, 7 September 2022 (UTC)

Charles Blonda Traoré (born 1 January 1992) is a Malian professional footballer who plays as a left-back for the Mali national team.

== Club career ==
Traoré joined Troyes in August 2015. He made his professional debut a few months later, in a 3–1 Ligue 1 victory against Lille.

On 31 August 2018, the last day of the 2018 summer transfer window, Traoré joined Ligue 1 side FC Nantes on a three-year contract.

On 30 January 2025, Traoré's contract with Bastia was terminated by mutual consent.

== International career ==
Traoré was born in Bamako. He holds Malian and French nationalities. He made his debut for the Mali national team in a friendly 1–0 loss to Nigeria on 27 May 2016.
