= Kader Bamba =

French footballer (born 1994)

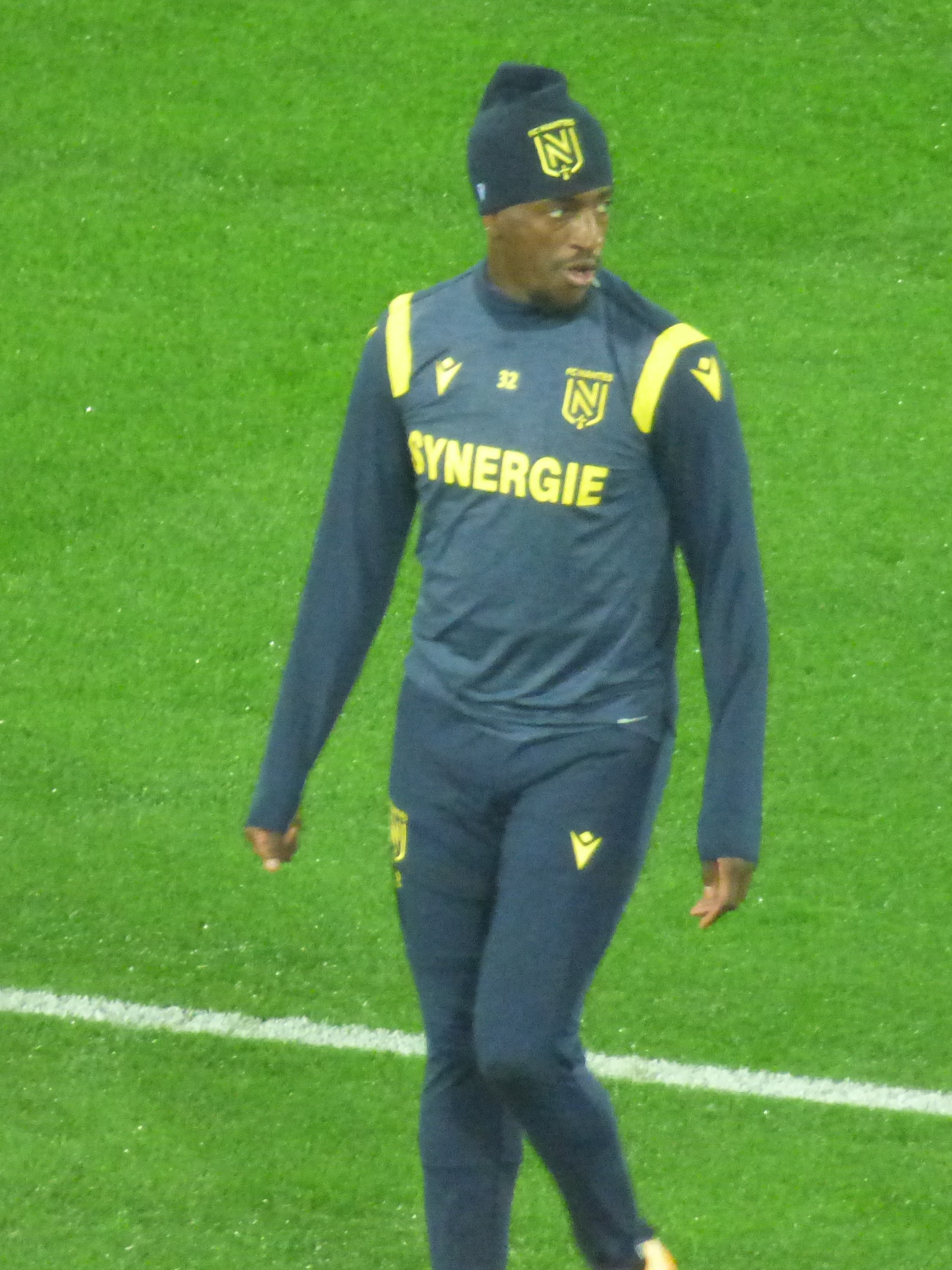
- Bamba with Nantes in 2020

Personal information
- Full name: Abdoul Kader Bamba
- Date of birth: 25 April 1994 (age 32)
- Place of birth: Sarcelles, France
- Height: 1.77 m (5 ft 10 in)
- Position: Left winger

Team information
- Current team: Granada
- Number: 17

Youth career
- 2006–2011: Toulouse
- 2011–2012: Sedan

Senior career*
Years	Team	Apps	(Gls)
2012–2013	Sedan B	8	(0)
2013–2016	Cosmo Taverny	12	(6)
2016–2018	Le Mans	31	(4)
2018–2019	Nantes B	25	(10)
2019–2024	Nantes	83	(6)
2021–2022	→ Amiens (loan)	28	(2)
2023	→ Saint-Étienne (loan)	14	(4)
2025–2026	Clermont	38	(8)
2026–	Granada	0	(8)
- * Club domestic league appearances and goals as of 12 May 2026

Abdoul Kader Bamba (born 25 April 1994) is a French professional footballer who plays as a left winger for Segunda División club Granada.

== Career ==
A youth product of Toulouse, Bamba spent his early career in amateur leagues in France before transferring to Nantes on 27 May 2018. He made his professional debut for Nantes in a 2–1 Ligue 1 loss to Lille on 11 August 2019.

On 31 August 2021, Bamba joined Amiens on loan. On 14 January 2023, he signed for Saint-Étienne on loan until the end of the season.

On 20 January 2025, Bamba moved to Clermont on a one-and-a-half-year deal. On 23 July 2026, he moved abroad for the first time in his career, signing for Segunda División side Granada.

== Personal life ==
Born in France, Bamba is of Ivorian descent and holds Ivorian and French nationalities.
