= Roli Pereira de Sa =

French footballer (born 1996)

Personal information
- Date of birth: 10 December 1996 (age 29)
- Place of birth: Mantes-la-Jolie, France
- Height: 1.78 m (5 ft 10 in)
- Position: Midfielder

Youth career
- 2011–2016: Paris Saint-Germain

Senior career*
Years	Team	Apps	(Gls)
2013–2017	Paris Saint-Germain B	53	(6)
2016	→ Paris FC (loan)	14	(1)
2016–2017	→ Tours (loan)	3	(0)
2016–2017	→ Tours B (loan)	2	(1)
2017–2020	Nantes B	59	(7)
2019–2022	Nantes	24	(0)
2022–2025	Sochaux	45	(2)

International career
2011–2012	France U16	8	(5)
2012–2013	France U17	6	(1)
2014	France U18	2	(0)
2014	France U19	2	(0)
2016	France U20	5	(0)
- * Club domestic league appearances and goals as of 26 May 2025

Roli Pereira de Sa (born 10 December 1996) is a French professional footballer who plays as a midfielder.

== Career ==
=== Paris Saint-Germain ===
Pereira de Sa joined the Paris Saint-Germain Academy in 2011. In January 2016, he was loaned to Paris FC until the end of the season. He made his debut with the Ligue 2 team on 29 January 2016 in a match against Brest. Pereira de Sa was loaned to Tours on 31 August 2016. He was sent back to Paris Saint-Germain on 1 January 2017.

=== Nantes ===
Peireira de Sa joined Nantes on 8 August 2017 for four seasons.

=== Sochaux ===
On 1 June 2022, Pereira de Sa signed for Ligue 2 side Sochaux on a three-year contract.

== Personal life ==
Born in France, Pereira de Sa is of Angolan and DR Congolese descent.

== Career statistics ==
As of 18 March 2017

Appearances and goals by club, season and competition
Club	Season	League			Cup		League Cup		Europe		Other		Total	
Club	Season	Division	Apps	Goals	Apps	Goals	Apps	Goals	Apps	Goals	Apps	Goals	Apps	Goals
Paris Saint-Germain	2016–17	Ligue 1	0	0	0	0	0	0	0	0	0	0	0	0
Paris FC (loan)	2015–16	Ligue 2	14	1	0	0	0	0	—		—		14	1
Tours (loan)	2016–17	Ligue 2	3	0	0	0	0	0	—		—		3	0
Career total			17	1	0	0	0	0	0	0	0	0	17	1

== Honours ==
Nantes

- Coupe de France: 2021–22
