= Bridge Ndilu =

French footballer (born 2000)

Personal information
- Date of birth: 21 July 2000 (age 26)
- Place of birth: Le Mans, France
- Height: 1.86 m (6 ft 1 in)
- Position: Forward

Team information
- Current team: Olympique Saumur

Youth career
- 2016–2017: Laval

Senior career*
Years	Team	Apps	(Gls)
2017–2019	Laval II	27	(8)
2017–2019	Laval	29	(7)
2019–2023	Nantes II	20	(7)
2019–2023	Nantes	6	(0)
2021–2022	→ Quevilly-Rouen (loan)	17	(1)
2022–2023	→ Cholet (loan)	25	(3)
2023–2024	Swift Hesperange		
2026–	Olympique Saumur	1	(0)

International career
2018	France U18	4	(2)
2018–2019	France U19	6	(0)
- * Club domestic league appearances and goals as of 6 September 2026

Bridge Ndilu (born 21 July 2000) is a French professional footballer who plays as a forward for French club Olympique Saumur FC. A product of the FC Nantes academy, he has since gone on to play for other French teams before joining Swift Hesperange.

== Club career ==
Ndilu played for Stade Lavallois from 2017 to 2019, turning professional in 2018. There he gained much game time in France's Championnat National raising the attention of clubs such as Juventus with a potential €4 million transfer fee. He eventually was transferred to FC Nantes on 24 June 2019.

Ndilu made his professional debut for Nantes in a 2–0 Coupe de France win over Aviron Bayonnais on 4 January 2020.

Although Ndilu's emergence in the professional team was tempered by the arrival of forwards such as Renaud Emond, his manager Christian Gourcuff in January 2020 expressed confidence that Ndilu would eventually make his way to the Ligue 1 first team.

On 31 August 2021, he joined Ligue 2 club Quevilly-Rouen on loan.

On 17 September 2022, Ndilu was loaned to Cholet in Championnat National for the season.

== International career ==
Born in France, Ndilu is of Congolese descent. Ndilu represented the France U19s at the 2018 UEFA European Under-19 Championship.
