= 2024–25 FC Nantes season =

FC Nantes
2024–25 season
- Owner: Waldemar Kita
- President: Waldemar Kita
- Manager: Antoine Kombouaré
- Stadium: Stade de la Beaujoire
- Ligue 1: 13th
- Coupe de France: Round of 32
- Top goalscorer: League: Matthis Abline (5); All: Matthis Abline (7)
- Average home league attendance: 30,269
Home colours	Away colours

The 2024–25 season was the 82nd season in the history of the FC Nantes, and the club's 12th consecutive season in Ligue 1. In addition to the domestic league, the team will participate in the Coupe de France.

Antoine Kombouaré was dismissed as head coach on 20 May 2025, after enduring a challenging season.

== Players ==
=== First-team squad ===
As of 5 December 2024

Note: Flags indicate national team as defined under FIFA eligibility rules; some limited exceptions apply. Players may hold more than one non-FIFA nationality.

No.	Pos.	Nation	Player
1	GK	FRA	Alban Lafont
2	DF	HAI	Jean-Kévin Duverne
3	DF	FRA	Nicolas Cozza (on loan from VfL Wolfsburg)
4	DF	FRA	Nicolas Pallois
5	MF	ESP	Pedro Chirivella (captain)
6	MF	BRA	Douglas Augusto
7	FW	CMR	Ignatius Ganago
8	MF	FRA	Johann Lepenant (on loan from Lyon)
10	FW	ZIM	Tino Kadewere
11	DF	GLP	Marcus Coco
17	MF	CIV	Jean-Philippe Gbamin
21	DF	CMR	Jean-Charles Castelletto

No.	Pos.	Nation	Player
22	MF	WAL	Sorba Thomas (on loan from Huddersfield Town)
25	MF	FRA	Florent Mollet
27	FW	NGR	Moses Simon
28	DF	FRA	Fabien Centonze
30	GK	SWE	Patrik Carlgren
31	FW	EGY	Mostafa Mohamed
39	FW	FRA	Matthis Abline
44	DF	FRA	Nathan Zézé
50	GK	FRA	Hugo Barbet
59	MR	FRA	Dehmaine Assoumani
62	FW	GUI	Herba Guirassy
66	MF	FRA	Louis Leroux
98	DF	FRA	Kelvin Amian

=== Out on loan ===
Note: Flags indicate national team as defined under FIFA eligibility rules; some limited exceptions apply. Players may hold more than one non-FIFA nationality.

No. / Pos. / Nation / Player; — / MF / FRA / Yassine Benhattab (at Aubagne until 30 June 2025)	No. / Pos. / Nation / Player; — / MF / SEN / Lamine Diack (at Hatayspor until 30 June 2025)

=== Other players under contract ===
Note: Flags indicate national team as defined under FIFA eligibility rules; some limited exceptions apply. Players may hold more than one non-FIFA nationality.

No.	Pos.	Nation	Player
41	DF	FRA	Mathieu Acapandié
54	FW	COM	Adel Mahamoud

No.	Pos.	Nation	Player
71	DF	FRA	Hugo Boutsingkham
72	DF	FRA	Sékou Doucouré

== Transfers ==
=== In ===
No.	Pos.	Player	Transferred from	Fee	Date	Source
10	FW	(Zimbabwe) Tino Kadewere	(France) Lyon	Free	14 May 2024 (Note: Loan that was made permanent before the transfer window opened)	
39	FW	(France) Matthis Abline	(France) Rennes	€10 million (Note: Up to €2 million in bonuses)	3 July 2024	
22	MF	(Wales) Sorba Thomas	(England) Huddersfield Town	Loan (Note: Includes an option to sign permanently)	30 July 2024	
8	MF	(France) Johann Lepenant	(France) Lyon	Loan (Note: Includes an option to sign permanently for €2.5 million)	10 August 2024	
17	MF	(Ivory Coast) Jean-Philippe Gbamin	Unattached	Free	27 August 2024	
3	DF	(France) Nicolas Cozza	(Germany) VfL Wolfsburg	Loan	28 August 2024	
30	GK	(Sweden) Patrik Carlgren	Unattached	Free	30 August 2024	
—	MF	(France) Yassine Benhattab	(France) Aubagne	Undisclosed	30 August 2024	
16	GK	(Portugal) Anthony Lopes	(France) Lyon	Free	1 January 2025	

=== Out ===
Pos.	Player	Transferred to	Fee	Date	Source
MF	(France) Lohann Doucet	(France) Paris FC	€300,000	23 May 2024	
DF	(Switzerland) Eray Cömert	(Spain) Valencia	Loan return	1 July 2024	
DF	(France) Nicolas Cozza	(Germany) VfL Wolfsburg	Loan return	1 July 2024	
FW	(Ivory Coast) Bénie Traoré	(England) Sheffield United	Loan return	1 July 2024	
FW	(France) Matthis Abline	(France) Rennes	Loan return	1 July 2024	
MF	(France) Moussa Sissoko	Released (Note: On 10 July 2024, Sissoko joined Watford.)	Free	1 July 2024	
GK	(Slovenia) Denis Petrić	Released (Note: On 6 August 2024, Petrić joined Lens.)	Free	1 July 2024	
MF	(Democratic Republic of the Congo) Samuel Moutoussamy	Released (Note: On 22 August 2024, Moutoussamy joined Sivasspor.)	Free	1 July 2024	
GK	(France) Rémy Descamps	Released (Note: On 23 August 2024, Descamps joined Lyon.)	Free	1 July 2024	
FW	(France) Kader Bamba	Released	Free	1 July 2024	
MF	(Senegal) Lamine Diack	(Turkey) Hatayspor	Loan (Note: Includes an option to sign permanently for €2.5 million)	30 July 2024	
FW	(France) Stredair Appuah	(Italy) Palermo	€1.5 million	7 August 2024	
DF	(Ivory Coast) Michel Junior Diaz	(France) Troyes	€2.5 million	8 August 2024	
DF	(France) Bastien Meupiyou	(England) Wolverhampton Wanderers	€5 million (Note: Up to €1 million in bonuses)	29 August 2024	
MF	(France) Yassine Benhattab	(France) Aubagne	Loan	30 August 2024	

== Friendlies ==
=== Pre-season ===
12 July 2024 Friendly	Caen	0–1	Nantes	Switzerland
18:00 UTC+2			Mahamoud 60'

20 July 2024 Friendly	Hamburger SV	4–2	Nantes	Saalfelden am Steinernen Meer, Austria
15:00	Heyer 72'; Hadžikadunić 82'; Baldé 86'; Jatta 98'		Mahamoud 10'; Pallois 26'	Stadium: 1508 SaalfeldenArena
Note: Two periods of 60 minutes

27 July 2024 Friendly	Nantes	2–1	Dunkerque	Saint-Nazaire, France
17:00	Simon 2'; Centonze 90+2'		Courtet 61' (pen.)	Stadium: Stade Léo Lagrange

3 August 2024 Friendly	Laval	1–2	Nantes	Laval, France
17:30 UTC+1	Zohi 45'		Kadewere 24'; Simon 61' (pen.)	Stadium: Stade Francis Le Basser

7 August 2024 Friendly	Nantes	1–1	Lorient	Saint-Nazaire, France
17:00 UTC+2	Mohamed 42'		Soumano 67'	Stadium: Stade Léo Lagrange

11 August 2024 Friendly	Crystal Palace	1–1	Nantes	London, England
15:00 UTC+1	Kamada 61'		Castelletto 19'	Stadium: Selhurst Park

== Competitions ==
=== Overall record ===
Competition	First match	Last match	Starting round	Final position	Record							
Competition	First match	Last match	Starting round	Final position	Pld	W	D	L	GF	GA	GD	Win %
Ligue 1	18 August 2024	17 May 2025	Matchday 1	13th	34	8	12	14	39	52	−13	23.53
Coupe de France	21 December 2024	15 January 2025	Round of 64	Round of 32	2	1	0	1	5	2	+3	50.00
Total					36	9	12	15	44	54	−10	25.00

Source: Competitions

=== Ligue 1 ===
==== League table ====
Pos	Team	Pld	W	D	L	GF	GA	GD	Pts
11	Auxerre	34	11	9	14	48	51	−3	42
12	Rennes	34	13	2	19	51	50	+1	41
13	Nantes	34	8	12	14	39	52	−13	36
14	Angers	34	10	6	18	32	53	−21	36
15	Le Havre	34	10	4	20	40	71	−31	34

Source: Ligue 1
Rules for classification: 1) Points; 2) Goal difference; 3) Head-to-head points; 4) Head-to-head goal difference; 5) Head-to-head goals scored; 6) Head-to-head away goals scored; 7) Goals scored; 8) Away goals scored; 9) Fair-play points (Note: Head-to-head record is used only after all the matches between the teams in question have been played).

==== Results summary ====
Overall								Home						Away					
Pld	W	D	L	GF	GA	GD	Pts	W	D	L	GF	GA	GD	W	D	L	GF	GA	GD
34	8	12	14	39	52	−13	36	5	6	5	19	17	+2	3	6	9	20	35	−15

Last updated: complete.
Source: Ligue1.com

==== Results by round ====
Round	1	2	3	4	5	6	7	8	9	10	11	12	13	14	15	16	17	18	19	20	21	22	23	24	25	26	27	28	29	30	31	32	33	34
Ground	A	H	A	H	A	H	A	H	A	H	A	H	A	H	A	A	H	A	H	A	H	A	H	A	H	H	A	A	H	A	H	H	A	H
Result	D	W	W	L	D	D	L	D	L	L	L	L	D	W	L	D	D	D	D	W	L	L	W	L	L	W	L	W	D	L	D	L	D	W
Position	11	7	3	5	5	7	10	9	12	14	14	16	17	13	14	16	15	15	14	14	15	15	14	14	14	13	13	13	13	14	14	15	15	13

A = Away; H = Home; W = Win; D = Draw; L = Loss

==== Matches ====
The league schedule was released on 21 June 2024.

Fixture Win Draw Loss

18 August 2024 1	Toulouse	0–0	Nantes	Toulouse
17:00 CEST (UTC+2)	Kamanzi (yellow card) 24'	Report	Kadewere (yellow card) 45'; Castelletto (yellow card) 71'; Coco (yellow card) 71'	Stadium: Stadium de Toulouse; Attendance: 25,491; Referee: Jérémy Stinat

25 August 2024 2	Nantes	2–0	Auxerre	Nantes
17:00 CEST (UTC+2)	Simon 14'; Zézé (yellow card) 63'; Douglas (yellow card) 79'; Guirassy 90+6'	Report	Raveloson (yellow card) 20'; Onaiwu (red card) 54'	Stadium: Stade de la Beaujoire; Attendance: 31,077; Referee: Gaël Angoula

31 August 2024 3	Montpellier	1–3	Nantes	Montpellier
19:00 CEST (UTC+2)	Adams 30'; Nzingoula (yellow card) 85'; Ferri (yellow card) 90+3'	Report	Abline 24'; Simon 45+7' (pen.); Coco (yellow card) 81'; Lafont (yellow card) 85'; Mohamed 85'	Stadium: Stade de la Mosson; Attendance: 13,000; Referee: Benoît Millot

15 September 2024 4	Nantes	1–2	Reims	Nantes
19:00 CEST (UTC+2)	Pallois (yellow card) 12'; Douglas 28'; Gbamin (yellow card) 89'; Amian (yellow card) 90+1'	Report	Munetsi 34', (yellow card) 69'; Nakamura 90+1'	Stadium: Stade de la Beaujoire; Attendance: 29,811; Referee: Willy Delajod

22 September 2024 5	Angers	1–1	Nantes	Angers
19:00 CEST (UTC+2)	Abdelli 24' (pen.); Allevinah (yellow card) 45+1'	Report	Lepenant 18'; Augusto (yellow card) 32'; Duverne (yellow card) 54'; Mohamed (yellow card) 67'; Pallois (yellow card) 87'	Stadium: Stade Raymond Kopa; Attendance: 16,942; Referee: Mathieu Vernice

29 September 2024 6	Nantes	2–2	Saint-Étienne	Nantes
19:00 CEST (UTC+2)	Lepenant 10'; Thomas 49'; Abline (yellow card) 53'; Castelletto (yellow card) 65'; Coco (red card) 90+8'	Report	Sissoko 57', 67' (pen.); Amougou (yellow card) 73'; Larsonneur (yellow card) 90+7'	Stadium: Stade de la Beaujoire; Attendance: 34,005; Referee: Abdelatif Kherradji

6 October 2024 7	Lyon	2–0	Nantes	Décines-Charpieu
15:00 CEST (+2)	Tagliafico 22' (yellow card) 67'; Pallois 54' (o.g.)	Report	Cozza (yellow card) 61'; Augusto (yellow card) 71'	Stadium: Parc Olympique Lyonnais; Attendance: 51,888; Referee: Marc Bollengier

20 October 2024 8	Nantes	1–1	Nice	Nantes
17:00 CEST (UTC+2)	Zézé (yellow card) 33'; Chirivella (yellow card) 38'; Abline 67'	Report	Guessand 72'; Clauss (yellow card) 89'	Stadium: Stade de la Beaujoire; Attendance: 28,141; Referee: Gaël Angoula

27 October 2024 9	Strasbourg	3–1	Nantes	Strasbourg
17:00 CET (UTC+1)	Santos 17' 57' (yellow card) 38'; Bakwa 73'; Diarra (yellow card) 90+6'	Report	Guirassy 83'; Lepenant (yellow card) 87'; Ganago (yellow card) 90+2'; Zézé (yellow card) 90+6'	Stadium: Stade de la Meinau; Attendance: 19,398; Referee: Hakim Ben El Hadj

3 November 2024 10	Nantes	1–2	Marseille	Nantes
20:45 CET (UTC+1)	Kadewere 39'; Pallois (yellow card) 90+7'	Report	Maupay 24'; Greenwood 61'; Balerdi (yellow card) 90+3'	Stadium: Stade de la Beaujoire; Attendance: 33,248; Referee: Bastien Dechepy

9 November 2024 11	Lens	3–2	Nantes	Lens
19:00 CET (UTC+1)	Frankowski 21' (pen.); Medina (yellow card) 36'; Labeau Lascary (yellow card) 45+5'; Ojediran 86'; Thomasson 90'	Report	Simon 36' (pen.); Cozza 71'	Stadium: Stade Félix-Bollaert; Attendance: 38,202; Referee: Clément Turpin

24 November 2024 12	Nantes	0–2	Le Havre	Nantes
17:00 CET (UTC+1)	Duverne (yellow card) 54'; Simon (yellow card) 62'	Report	Casimir 3'; Desmas (yellow card) 72'; Centonze 74' (o.g.)	Stadium: Stade de la Beaujoire; Attendance: 26,936; Referee: Jérôme Brisard

30 November 2024 13	Paris Saint-Germain	1–1	Nantes	Paris
21:00 CET (UTC+1)	Hakimi 2'	Report	Abline 38'	Stadium: Parc des Princes; Attendance: 47,926; Referee: Jérémy Stinat

8 December 2024 14	Nantes	1–0	Rennes	Nantes
17:00 CET (UTC+1)	Augusto (yellow card) 54'; Simon 89'	Report	Faye (red card) 45+4'	Stadium: Stade de la Beaujoire; Referee: Eric Wattellier

15 December 2024 15	Brest	4–1	Nantes	Brest
23.00 CET (UTC+1)	Chardonnet (yellow card) 15', (goal) 27'; Doumbia 24'; Magnetti (yellow card) 54'; Camara (yellow card) 76'; Sima 88', 90+3'	Report	Castelletto (yellow card) 46'; Augusto 48'; Pallois (yellow card) 58'; Chirivella (yellow card) 60'	Stadium: Stade Francis-Le Blé; Attendance: 15.019; Referee: Gaël Angoula

4 January 2025 16	Lille	1–1	Nantes	Villeneuve-d'Ascq
19:00 CET (UTC+1)	Gudmundsson 40'; Haraldsson (yellow card) 77'	Report	Abline 70' (pen.); Cozza (yellow card) 72'; Castelletto (yellow card) 88'	Stadium: Stade Pierre-Mauroy; Attendance: 41,635; Referee: Jérémie Pignard

10 January 2025 17	Nantes	2–2	Monaco	Nantes
19:00 CET (UTC+1)	Abline 12'; Amian 47'; Thomas (yellow card) 53'; Lepenant (yellow card) 87'; Pallois (yellow card) 90+4'	Report	Embolo 52'; Salisu 59'	Stadium: Stade de la Beaujoire; Attendance: 25,380; Referee: Marc Bollengier

19 January 2025 18	Saint-Étienne	1–1	FC Nantes	Saint-Étienne
15:00 CET (UTC+1)	Larsonneur (yellow card) 22'; Batubinsika (yellow card) 41'; Boakye 86'	Report	Simon 14'; Chirivella (yellow card) 39'	Stadium: Stade Geoffroy-Guichard; Referee: Florent Batta

26 January 2025 19	Nantes	1–1	Lyon	Nantes
17:15 CET (UTC+1)	Pallois (yellow card) 41'; Mollet (yellow card) 57'; Mohamed 90'; Coco (yellow card) 90+4'	Report	Nuamah 10'; Mata (yellow card) 69'	Stadium: Stade de la Beaujoire; Referee: Benoît Bastien

2 February 2025 20	Reims	1–2	Nantes	Reims
17:15 CET (UTC+1)	Castelletto 45+1' (o.g.); Sangui (yellow card) 80'; Kipré (yellow card) 90+3'; Okumu (yellow card) 90+4', (red card) 90+4'	Report	Abline 42'; Mohamed 70', (yellow card) 71'; Lepenant (yellow card) 80'; Pallois (yellow card) 89'	Stadium: Stade Auguste-Delaune; Attendance: 12,712; Referee: Benoît Millot

7 February 2025 21	Nantes	0–2	Brest	Nantes
19:00 CET (UTC+1)	Douglas Augusto (yellow card) 65'; Chirivella (yellow card) 86'; Amian (yellow card) 90+2'	Report	Ajorque 9'; Magnetti (yellow card) 36'; Bizot (yellow card) 89'; Lees-Melou 90+6'	Stadium: Stade de la Beaujoire; Attendance: 25,050; Referee: Jérémie Pignard

15 February 2025 22	Monaco	7–1	Nantes	Monaco
19:00 CET (UTC+1)	Biereth 44', 54', 64' (pen.); Minamino 45'; Ben Seghir 49'; Ilenikhena 81', 90+5'; Zakaria (yellow card) 85'	Report	Abline 4', (yellow card) 45'; Cozza (red card) 8'	Stadium: Stade Louis II; Attendance: 6,080; Referee: Thomas Léonard

23 February 2025 23	Nantes	3–1	Lens	Nantes
15:00 CET (UTC+1)	Leroux 36'; Amian (yellow card) 58'; Simon 60' (pen.); Lopes (yellow card) 82'; Elia 90+5'	Report	Gradit (yellow card) 28'; Medina (yellow card) 45+1'; El Aynaoui 65' (pen.); Thomasson (yellow card) 66'; Nzola (red card) 70'; Fulgini (yellow card) 90+8'	Stadium: Stade de la Beaujoire; Attendance: 29,000; Referee: Jérôme Brisard

2 March 2025 24	Marseille	2–0	Nantes	Marseille
20:45 CET (UTC+1)	Højbjerg (yellow card) 37'; Gouiri 73'; Greenwood 77'	Report	Amian (yellow card) 51'; Leroux (yellow card) 75'	Stadium: Stade Vélodrome; Attendance: 61,874; Referee: Stéphanie Frappart

9 March 2025 25	Nantes	0–1	Strasbourg	Nantes
17:15 CET (UTC+1)	Douglas (yellow card) 40'	Report	Sarr (yellow card) 7'; Lemaréchal 79'	Stadium: Stade de la Beaujoire; Attendance: 27,645; Referee: Hakim Ben El Hadj

15 March 2025 26	Nantes	1–0	Lille	Nantes
18:00 CET (UTC+1)	Chirivella (yellow card) 12'; Simon (yellow card) 54'; Castelletto (red card) 74'; Mohamed 83'	Report	Mandi (yellow card) 57'; Haraldsson (yellow card) 66'; Bakker (yellow card) 67'	Stadium: Stade de la Beaujoire; Attendance: 28,621; Referee: Benoît Millot

30 March 2025 27	Le Havre	3–2	Nantes	Le Havre
17:15 CET (UTC+1)	Touré 13' (pen.), 27' (pen.); Pembélé (yellow card) 18', (goal) 88'	Report	Sow 23'; Simon 48'; Thomas (yellow card) 64'; Pallois (yellow card) 90+3'	Stadium: Stade Océane; Attendance: 20,426; Referee: Éric Wattelier

4 April 2024 28	Nice	1–2	Nantes	Nice
20:45 CEST (UTC+2)	Abdi 14'; Bombito (yellow card) 28'	Report	Augusto 11'; Abline 38'; Sow (yellow card) 47'	Stadium: Allianz Riviera; Attendance: 20,585; Referee: Hakim BEN EL HADJ

18 April 2025 30	Rennes	2–1	Nantes	Rennes
18:45 CEST (UTC+2)	Truffert 23'; Assignon (yellow card) 44'; Al-Taamari (yellow card) 45+5'; Meïté 86'; Blas (yellow card) 90+5'	Report	Lopes (yellow card) 12'; Zézé (yellow card) 20'; Mohamed (yellow card) 28', (goal) 54'; Augusto (yellow card) 45+5'; Coco (red card) 57'; Amian (yellow card) 86'	Stadium: Roazhon Park; Attendance: 27,880; Referee: Abdelatif Kherradji

22 April 2025 29	Nantes	1–1	Paris Saint-Germain	Nantes
20:45 CEST (UTC+2)	Castelletto (yellow card) 77'; Chirivella (yellow card) 79'; Augusto 83'	Report	Vitinha 33'	Stadium: Stade de la Beaujoire; Attendance: 34,420; Referee: Jérémie Pignard

27 April 2025 31	Nantes	0–0	Toulouse	Nantes
17:15 CEST (UTC+2)	Augusto (yellow card) 26'; Cozza (yellow card) 80'	Report	Canvot (yellow card) 9'; Edjouma (red card) 38'; Dønnum (yellow card) 80'; Cresswell (yellow card) 90+2'	Stadium: Stade de la Beaujoire; Attendance: 31,618; Referee: Florent Batta

4 May 2025 32	Nantes	0–1	Angers	Nantes
15:00 CEST (UTC+2)	Abline (yellow card) 12'; Zézé (yellow card) 69'	Report	Arcus (yellow card) 19'; Lepaul (yellow card) 40'; Allevinah 52'; Belkhdim (yellow card) 65'	Stadium: Stade de la Beaujoire; Attendance: 34,556; Referee: Thomas Léonard

10 May 2025 33	Auxerre	1–1	Nantes	Auxerre
21:00 CEST (UTC+2)	Perrin 45'; Sinayoko (yellow card) 71'; Jubal (yellow card) 80'; Diomandé (yellow card) 88'	Report	Zézé (yellow card) 56'; Leroux 62'	Stadium: Stade de l'Abbé-Deschamps; Attendance: 17,277; Referee: Marc Bollengier

17 May 2025 34	Nantes	3–0	Montpellier	Nantes
21:00 CEST (UTC+2)	Simon 18' (pen.); Coquelin 31', (yellow card) 71'; Thomas (yellow card) 53'; Pallois (yellow card) 57'; Abline 79'	Report	Chennahi (yellow card) 49'	Stadium: Stade de la Beaujoire; Referee: Clément Turpin

=== Coupe de France ===
21 December 2024 Round of 64	Drancy	0–4	Nantes	Saint-Ouen-sur-Seine
18:00		Report	Abline 21', 33'; Zézé 63'; Mohamed 83'	Stadium: Stade Bauer; Attendance: 3,718; Referee: Florent Batta

15 January 2025 Round of 32	Brest	2–1	Nantes	Brest
18:30	Sima 24'; Charonnet 34'	Report	Guirassy 83'	Stadium: Stade Francis-Le Blé; Attendance: 11,581; Referee: Abdelatif Kherradji
