= Hugo Barbet =

French footballer (born 2001)

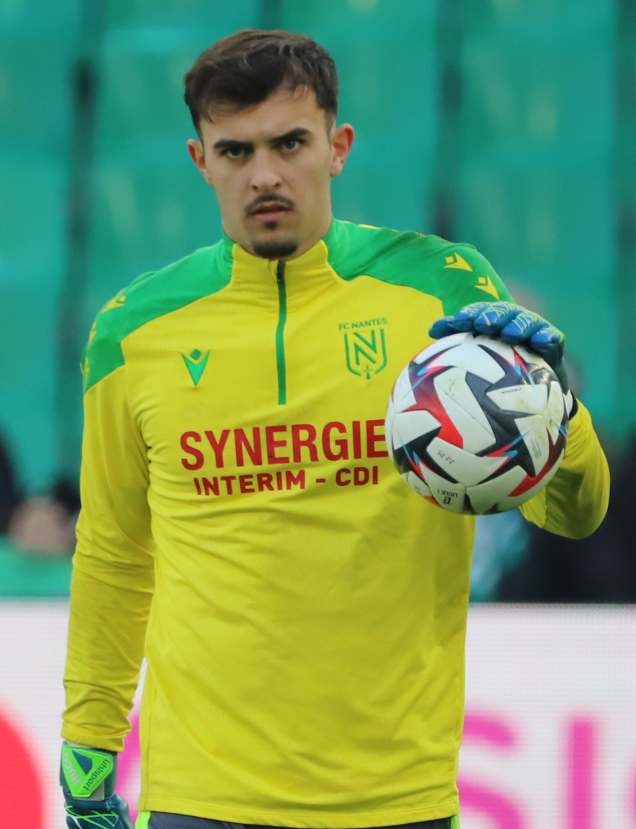
- Barbet with Nantes in 2025

Personal information
- Date of birth: 22 November 2001 (age 24)
- Place of birth: Challans, France
- Height: 1.89 m (6 ft 2 in)
- Position: Goalkeeper

Team information
- Current team: Dinan Léhon

Youth career
- 2007–2016: FC Challans
- 2016–2018: Guingamp

Senior career*
Years	Team	Apps	(Gls)
2018–2022	Guingamp II	18	(0)
2021–2023	Guingamp	2	(0)
2022–2023	→ Borgo (loan)	29	(0)
2023–2025	Nantes B	17	(0)
2024–2025	Nantes	0	(0)
2025–2026	Versailles B	8	(0)
2025	Versailles	2	(0)
2026–	Dinan Léhon	0	(0)

International career^{‡}
2019	France U18	2	(0)
2021–2022	France U20	7	(0)
- * Club domestic league appearances and goals as of 23:54, 15 August 2026 (UTC) ‡ National team caps and goals as of 7 October 2022

Hugo Barbet (born 22 November 2001) is a French professional footballer who plays as a goalkeeper for Championnat National 1 club Dinan Léhon.

== Club career ==
Born in Challans, France, he started to play in his hometown team.

In 2016 he joined EA Guingamp and made his debut in the first team in a 1—1 draw against Valenciennes in Ligue 2 on 8 January 2022.

On 19 June 2022, Borgo acquired him on a one-year loan.

At the end of the loan, he returned to Guingamp and decided not to renew his contract with the club, so on 6 July 2023 he became a new Nantes player as a free agent.

On 30 June 2025 he left Nantes joining Championnat National side Versailles. In August 2026, he signed for Dinan Léhon.

== International career ==
Barbet has represented France at under–19 and under–20 level.

In June 2019, he took part in the Maurice Revello Tournament in France

In June 2022, he won the Maurice Revello Tournament in France with the France U20 team.

== Career statistics ==
As of match played 6 October 2024

Appearances and goals by club, season and competition
Club	Season	League			Cup		Other		Total	
Club	Season	Division	Apps	Goals	Apps	Goals	Apps	Goals	Apps	Goals
Guingamp B	2018–19	CFA 3	3	0	—		—		3	0
Guingamp B	2019–20	CFA 2	4	0	—		—		4	0
Guingamp B	2020–21	CFA 2	1	0	—		—		1	0
Guingamp B	2021–22	CFA 2	10	0	—		—		10	0
Guingamp B	Total		18	0	—		—		18	0
Guingamp	2021–22	Ligue 2	2	0	0	0	—		2	0
Borgo (loan)	2022–23	CFA	29	0	0	0	—		29	0
Nantes B	2023–24	CFA 3	15	0	—		—		15	0
Nantes B	2024–25	CFA 3	2	0	—		—		2	0
Nantes B	Total		17	0	—		—		17	0
Nantes	2023–24	Ligue 1	0	0	0	0	0	0	0	0
Nantes	2024–25	Ligue 1	0	0	0	0	0	0	0	0
Nantes	Total		0	0	0	0	0	0	0	0
Versailles	2025–26	Championnat National	0	0	—		—		0	0
Career total			64	0	0	0	0	0	64	0
