= Nathan Zézé =

French footballer (born 2005)

Personal information
- Date of birth: 18 June 2005 (age 21)
- Place of birth: Nantes, France
- Height: 1.90 m (6 ft 3 in)
- Position: Centre-back

Team information
- Current team: Neom
- Number: 44

Youth career
- 2011–2013: US Loire-et-Divatte
- 2013–2023: Nantes

Senior career*
Years	Team	Apps	(Gls)
2022–2025	Nantes B	28	(1)
2023–2025	Nantes	32	(0)
2025–	Neom	43	(2)

International career^{‡}
2021	France U17	6	(0)
2022–2023	France U18	2	(0)
2024–	France U21	8	(3)
- * Club domestic league appearances and goals as of 5 November 2026 ‡ National team caps and goals as of 14:37, 28 July 2026 (UTC)

Nathan Zézé (born 18 June 2005) is a French professional footballer who plays as a centre-back for Saudi Pro League club Neom.

== Early life ==
Having grown up in La Varenne, just North-East of the Nantes Metropolis, Nathan Zézé joined the Nantes Academy as an under-9.

== Club career ==
Growing through the youth ranks of the team from Brittany, Zézé came to captain its under-17 and under-19 sides, despite being the youngest on the pitch when he first captained the latter in 2021. During the 2021–22 season he helped the under-19s to a national title, qualifying them for the European Youth League.

At the start of the 2022–23 season, Zézé moved to the reserve National 2 team, whilst also playing the UEFA Youth League.

Having already appeared on the team sheet in Ligue 1 against Auxerre during the previous encounter, Zézé made his professional debut for Nantes on the 7 January 2023, during the 2–0 away Coupe de France win to AF Virois. He replaced an injured Nicolas Pallois before half-time, as his team had just scored its first goal, Zézé helping them to keep a clean-sheet for the rest of the game.

On 28 July 2025, Zézé joined Saudi Pro League club Neom.

== International career ==
Born in France, Zézé is of Ivorian descent through his father. He is a youth international for France, having played with France under-17s until 2021, before being selected with the under-18 for the Tournoi de Limoges the following year.

== Style of play ==
A left-footed centre-back, Zézé has been described as a tall defender with good positioning and anticipation, capable in aerial duels and comfortable in possession, including with both short and long passes.

== Career statistics ==
As of match played 17 May 2025

Appearances and goals by club, season and competition
Club	Season	League			Cup		Europe		Total	
Club	Season	Division	Apps	Goals	Apps	Goals	Apps	Goals	Apps	Goals
Nantes B	2022–23	CFA 2	22	1	—		—		22	1
Nantes B	2023–24	National 3	4	0	—		—		4	0
Nantes B	2024–25	National 3	2	0	—		—		2	0
Nantes B	Total		28	1	—		—		28	1
Nantes	2022–23	Ligue 1	1	0	1	0	—		2	0
Nantes	2023–24	Ligue 1	13	0	1	0	—		14	0
Nantes	2024–25	Ligue 1	18	0	1	0	—		19	0
Nantes	Total		32	0	3	0	—		35	0
Career total			70	1	3	0	0	0	73	1
