= Florent Mollet =

French footballer (born 1991)

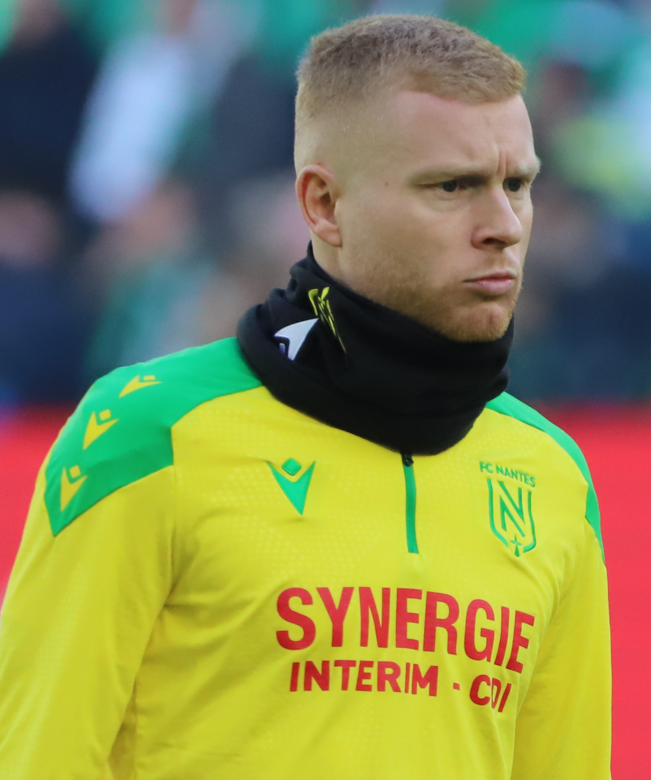
- Mollet with Nantes in 2025

Personal information
- Date of birth: 19 November 1991 (age 34)
- Place of birth: Fontaine-lès-Dijon, France
- Height: 1.70 m (5 ft 7 in)
- Position: Midfielder

Team information
- Current team: Lausanne-Sport
- Number: 91

Youth career
- 1998–2010: Dijon

Senior career*
Years	Team	Apps	(Gls)
2010–2015	Dijon B	35	(6)
2012–2015	Dijon	75	(4)
2015–2016	Créteil	36	(11)
2016–2018	Metz	47	(7)
2018–2022	Montpellier	126	(21)
2022–2023	Schalke 04	9	(1)
2023–2025	Nantes	57	(5)
2024	Nantes B	1	(0)
2025–	Lausanne-Sport	32	(4)
- * Club domestic league appearances and goals as of 28 September 2026

Florent Mollet (born 19 November 1991) is a French professional footballer who plays as a midfielder for Swiss Super League club Lausanne-Sport.

He made his professional debut for Dijon in Ligue 2 in 2012, and three years later joined fellow league team Créteil. In his only season for the latter, he scored 11 goals, but the team suffered relegation and he moved on to Metz in Ligue 1. Two years later, after his club was again relegated, he moved to Montpellier. In summer 2022, Mollet signed for Schalke 04 before moving to Nantes only half a year later.

== Career ==
=== Dijon ===
Born in Fontaine-lès-Dijon, Côte-d'Or, Mollet began his career at local team Dijon. His first senior call-up was as an unused substitute on 20 May 2012, as his team concluded the Ligue 2 season with a 5–0 loss at Rennes.

He made his first appearance on 27 July, as the subsequent campaign began with a 1–0 win over Guingamp at the Stade Gaston Gérard. As a substitute, he scored in a penalty shootout on 7 August, as Dijon won at Châteauroux in the first round of the Coupe de la Ligue. On 11 January 2013, he scored his first goal, opening a 3–0 home win over Le Mans.

Mollet totalled four goals in 36 games in his first season, but did not scored in 39 league games for the rest of his time at the club. However, he scored seven goals in four games of the 2014–15 Coupe de France, including hat-tricks in consecutive away wins at Vichy (9–0) and 3 Rivières (6–1). On 4 January 2015, in the last 64 of the competition away to Ligue 1 team Caen, he scored the extra-time winner in a 3–2 victory.

=== Creteil ===
On 17 June 2015, Mollet and fellow midfielder Guillaume Loriot joined fellow Ligue 2 team Créteil. He made his debut on 31 July, starting as they began the season with a 1–0 win at fellow Île-de-France team Red Star. He scored a career-best 11 goals in 36 games for Les Béliers who were nonetheless relegated.

=== Metz ===
On 27 June 2016, Mollet was the seventh player signed by Metz ahead of their return to Ligue 1, signing a three-year deal with the club from Lorraine. He made his top-flight debut on 13 August, starting and playing 70 minutes of a 3–2 home win over Lille before being substituted for Ismaïla Sarr, having a 100% pass completion rate. On 14 December, he scored his first goal for the club to open a 1–1 home draw against Toulouse in the last 16 of the Coupe de la Ligue, as his team advanced 11–10 on penalties.

Having not scored at all in his first season at the Stade Saint-Symphorien, Mollet recorded his first top flight goal on 9 December 2017, opening a 1–1 home draw with Rennes. He added six more over the campaign, including two in a 6–3 loss at Marseille on 2 February 2018, as his team were relegated in last place.

=== Montpellier ===
On 11 July 2018, Mollet signed with Ligue 1 side Montpellier. He scored on his debut on 18 August away to Amiens, opening a 2–1 win. On 6 October, he was sent off in the first half of a 1–1 draw at Guingamp for sarcastically applauding the referee for booking him for a foul. Having achieved six goals in his first season, his initial three-year contract was extended by an undisclosed length.

In 2019–20, Mollet scored home and away against Dijon, taking four points from his hometown club. On 29 August 2020, he was sent off on video assistant referee review just before half time in a 2–1 loss at Rennes, for a boot to Faitout Maouassa's head.

On 7 April 2021, Mollet scored the only goal of a win at fourth-tier Voltigeurs de Châteaubriant to put Montpellier into the Coupe de France quarter-finals for the first time in nine years. He was sent off again on 16 May in a goalless draw at home to Brest, for a 39th-minute foul on Steve Mounie.

=== Schalke 04 ===
On 8 June 2022, Mollet agreed to join Schalke 04, newly promoted to the Bundesliga, signing a three-year contract. The transfer fee paid to Montpellier was a reported €700,000, with an additional €800,000 in potential bonuses. He made his debut as a 58th-minute substitute for Alex Král on 31 July in a 5–0 win away to fourth-tier Bremer SV in the first round of the DFB-Pokal, and scored his first goal on 23 October by coming on and equalising in a 2–1 loss at Hertha BSC.

=== Nantes ===
On 17 January 2023, Mollet signed a two-and-a-half-year contract with Nantes. On 22 January 2023 he made his debut with canaries in a penalties away win against ES Thaon in Coupe de France. Seven days later, Mollet made his debut in Ligue 1 as a substitute of Ludovic Blas against Clermont Foot.

=== Lausanne-Sport ===
On 4 October 2025, Mollet joined Swiss Super League club Lausanne-Sport on a short-term contract until the end of the season, with the option to extend.

== Career statistics ==
As of 7 February 2025

Appearances and goals by club, season and competition
Club	Season	League			National cup		League cup		Europe		Total	
Club	Season	Division	Apps	Goals	Apps	Goals	Apps	Goals	Apps	Goals	Apps	Goals
Dijon B	2013–14	CFA 2	6	0	—		—		—		6	0
Dijon B	2014–15	CFA 2	6	3	—		—		—		6	3
Dijon B	Total		12	3	0	0	0	0	0	0	12	3
Dijon	2012–13	Ligue 2	36	4	0	0	1	0	—		37	4
Dijon	2013–14	Ligue 2	22	0	1	0	1	0	—		24	0
Dijon	2014–15	Ligue 2	17	0	3	4	2	0	—		22	4
Dijon	Total		75	4	4	4	4	0	0	0	83	8
Créteil	2015–16	Ligue 2	36	11	0	0	0	0	—		36	11
Metz	2016–17	Ligue 1	25	0	1	0	2	1	—		28	1
Metz	2017–18	Ligue 1	22	7	2	0	2	0	—		26	7
Metz	Total		47	7	3	0	4	1	0	0	54	8
Montpellier	2018–19	Ligue 1	32	6	0	0	1	0	—		33	6
Montpellier	2019–20	Ligue 1	25	6	2	1	2	1	—		29	8
Montpellier	2020–21	Ligue 1	34	3	5	1	—		—		39	4
Montpellier	2021–22	Ligue 1	35	6	3	0	—		—		38	6
Montpellier	Total		126	21	10	2	3	1	0	0	139	24
Schalke 04	2022–23	Bundesliga	9	1	2	0	—		—		11	1
Nantes	2022–23	Ligue 1	19	0	1	0	—		—		20	0
Nantes	2023–24	Ligue 1	29	4	2	1	—		—		31	5
Nantes	2024–25	Ligue 1	9	0	0	0	—		—		9	0
Nantes	Total		57	4	3	1	—		—		60	5
Nantes B	2024–25	National 3	1	0	—		—		—		1	0
Career total			363	51	22	7	11	2	0	0	396	60
