= Jean-Kévin Duverne =

Haitian footballer (born 1997)

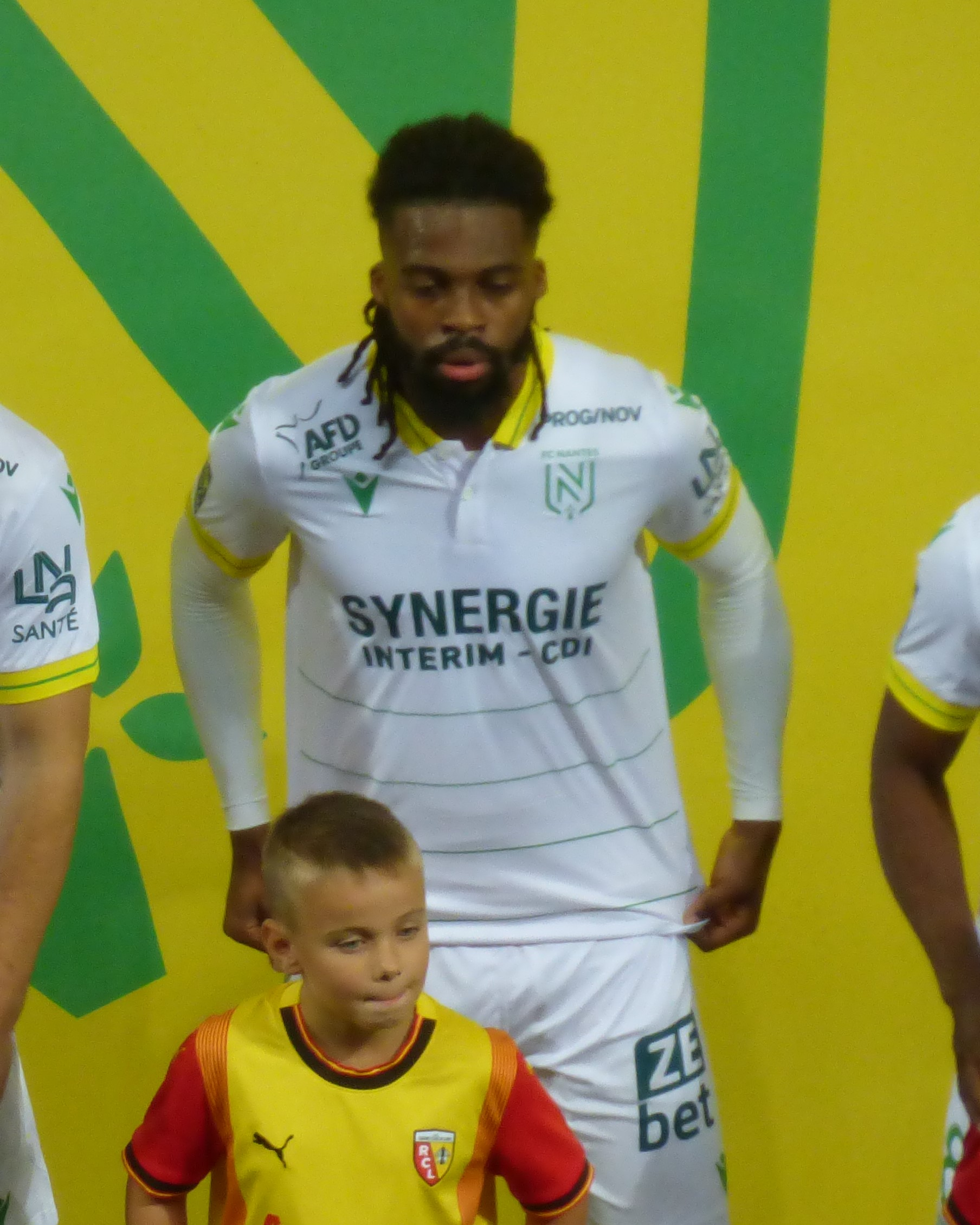
- Duverne in 2023

Personal information
- Date of birth: 12 July 1997 (age 29)
- Place of birth: Paris, France
- Height: 1.86 m (6 ft 1 in)
- Position: Right-back

Team information
- Current team: Omonia
- Number: 93

Youth career
- 2008–2010: AF Epinay
- 2010–2016: Lens

Senior career*
Years	Team	Apps	(Gls)
2014–2016	Lens B	38	(1)
2016–2019	Lens	89	(0)
2019–2023	Brest	112	(2)
2023–2026	Nantes	28	(0)
2025	→ Kortrijk (loan)	13	(4)
2025–2026	→ Gent (loan)	22	(1)
2026–	Omonia	4	(1)

International career^{‡}
2024–	Haiti	21	(1)
- * Club domestic league appearances and goals as of 20 September 2026 ‡ National team caps and goals as of 4 October 2026

Jean-Kévin Duverne (born 12 July 1997) is a professional footballer who plays as a right-back for Cypriot First Division club Omonia. Born in France, he plays for the Haiti national team.

== Club career ==
Duverne made his RC Lens first team debut on 5 August 2016 against Tours FC.

In 2019 he joined Brest and on 30 August 2023 he joined FC Nantes as free agent.

On 29 January 2025, Duverne moved to Kortrijk in Belgium on loan until the end of the season. On 8 September 2025, he returned to Belgium on a new loan with Gent.

== International career ==
Duverne was born in France and is of Haitian descent. On 17 May 2018, he was called up to represent the France national under-20 football team at the 2018 Toulon Tournament. He was called up to the Haiti national team for a set of 2026 FIFA World Cup qualification matches in June 2024, and scored on his debut, a 2–1 win over Saint Lucia on 6 June 2024.

On 15 May 2026, he was included in Haiti head coach Sébastien Migné's 26-man squad for the 2026 FIFA World Cup.

== Career statistics ==
=== Club ===
As of match played 20 September 2026

Appearances and goals by club, season and competition
Club	Season	League			National cup (Note: Includes Coupe de France, Belgian Cup)		Coupe de la Ligue		Other		Total	
Club	Season	Division	Apps	Goals	Apps	Goalss	Apps	Goals	Apps	Goals	Apps	Goals
Lens B	2014–15	CFA	21	0	—		—		—		21	0
Lens B	2015–16	CFA	16	1	—		—		—		16	1
Lens B	2018–19	CFA 2	1	0	—		—		—		1	0
Lens B	Total		38	1	—		—		—		38	1
Lens	2016–17	Ligue 2	37	0	4	0	1	0	—		42	0
Lens	2017–18	Ligue 2	36	0	6	0	1	0	—		43	0
Lens	2018–19	Ligue 2	14	0	0	0	0	0	4 (Note: Appearances in Ligue 1 relegation/promotion play-offs)	1	18	1
Lens	Total		87	0	10	0	2	0	4	1	103	1
Brest	2019–20	Ligue 1	14	0	1	0	1	0	—		16	0
Brest	2020–21	Ligue 1	27	1	2	0	—		—		29	1
Brest	2021–22	Ligue 1	37	1	3	0	—		—		40	1
Brest	2022–23	Ligue 1	34	0	2	0	—		—		36	0
Brest	Total		112	2	8	0	1	0	—		121	2
Nantes	2023–24	Ligue 1	19	0	1	0	—		—		20	0
Nantes	2024–25	Ligue 1	9	0	1	0	—		—		10	0
Nantes	2025–26	Ligue 1	0	0	0	0	—		—		0	0
Nantes	Total		28	0	2	0	—		—		30	0
Kortrijk (loan)	2024–25	Belgian Pro League	13	4	—		—		—		13	4
Gent (loan)	2025–26	Belgian Pro League	22	1	2	0	—		—		24	1
Omonia	2026–27	Cypriot First Division	4	1	0	0	3 (Note: Appearances in UEFA Europa League)	0	1 (Note: Appearance in Cypriot Super Cup)	0	8	1
Career total			304	9	22	0	6	0	5	1	337	10

=== International ===
As of match played 4 October 2026

Appearances and goals by national team and year
National team	Year	Apps	Goals
Haiti	2024	5	1
Haiti	2025	8	0
Haiti	2026	8	0
Total		21	1

Scores and results list Haiti's goal tally first, score column indicates score after each Duverne goal.

List of international goals scored by Jean-Kévin Duverne
No.	Date	Venue	Opponent	Score	Result	Competition
1	5 June 2024	Wildey Turf, Wildey, Barbados	Saint Lucia	1–1	2–1	2026 FIFA World Cup qualification
