= Herba Guirassy =

French footballer (born 2006)

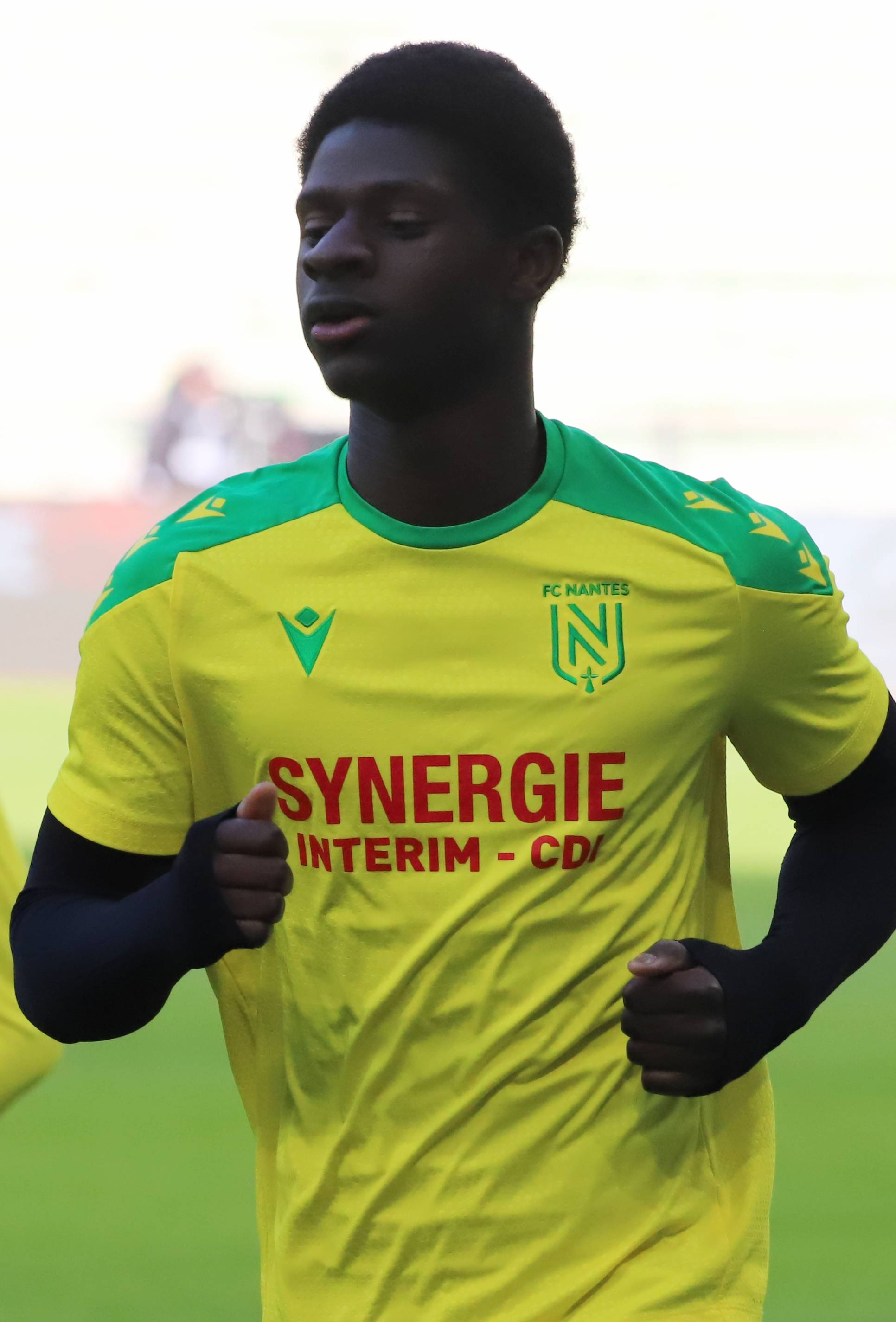
- Guirassy in 2025

Personal information
- Full name: Bahereba Guirassy
- Date of birth: 29 August 2006 (age 20)
- Place of birth: Angers, France
- Height: 1.77 m (5 ft 10 in)
- Position: Winger

Team information
- Current team: Young Boys
- Number: 12

Youth career
- Vaillante Angers
- 2019–2024: Nantes

Senior career*
Years	Team	Apps	(Gls)
2024–2025	Nantes II	7	(1)
2024–2026	Nantes	43	(5)
2026–	Young Boys	7	(2)

International career^{‡}
2025	France U19	3	(0)
2026–	France U21	1	(0)
- * Club domestic league appearances and goals as of 8 November 2026 ‡ National team caps and goals as of 23:00, 26 March 2026 (UTC)

Bahereba "Herba" Guirassy (born 29 August 2006) is a French professional footballer who plays as a winger for Swiss Super League club Young Boys.

== Career ==
Originally a youth product of Vaillante Angers, Guirassy moved to the youth academy of Nantes in 2019. A prolific scorer at youth level, Guirassy was the top scorer for the U17 Championship, and then scored the game winner for the U19 Championship in 2023. On 20 June 2023, he signed his first professional contract with Nantes until 2026. Guirassy made his senior and professional debut with Nantes in a 0–0 Ligue 1 tie with Toulouse on 18 August 2024.

On 31 August 2026, Guirassy signed a four-year contract with Young Boys in Switzerland.

== Personal life ==
Born in France, Guirassy is of Guinean descent.

== Career statistics ==
As of match played 19 September 2026

Appearances and goals by club, season and competition
Club	Season	League			Cup		Europe		Other		Total	
Club	Season	Division	Apps	Goals	Apps	Goals	Apps	Goals	Apps	Goals	Apps	Goals
Nantes II	2023–24	CFA 2	3	0	—		—		—		3	0
Nantes II	2024–25	CFA 2	4	1	—		—		—		4	1
Nantes II	Total		7	1	—		—		—		7	1
Nantes	2024–25	Ligue 1	19	2	2	1	—		—		21	3
Nantes	2025–26	Ligue 1	20	2	1	1	—		—		21	3
Nantes	2026–27	Ligue 2	4	1	0	0	—		—		4	1
Nantes	Total		43	5	3	2	—		—		46	7
Young Boys	2026–27	Swiss Super League	3	0	0	0	—		—		3	0
Career total			53	6	3	2	0	0	0	0	56	8

== Honours ==
Nantes U19

- Championnat National U19: 2022–23
