= Douglas Augusto =

Brazilian footballer (born 1997)

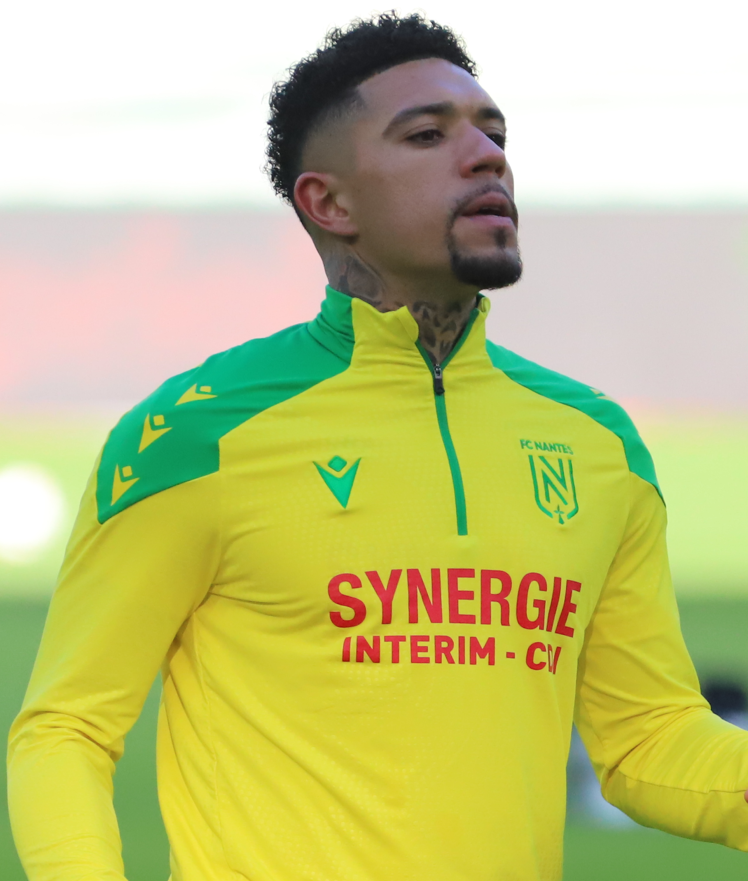
- Douglas Augusto with Nantes in 2025

Personal information
- Full name: Douglas Augusto Soares Gomes
- Date of birth: 13 January 1997 (age 29)
- Place of birth: Rio de Janeiro, Brazil
- Height: 1.73 m (5 ft 8 in)
- Position: Midfielder

Team information
- Current team: Krasnodar
- Number: 8

Youth career
- 2004–2015: Fluminense

Senior career*
Years	Team	Apps	(Gls)
2015–2018	Fluminense	53	(3)
2018–2019	Corinthians	15	(1)
2019	→ Bahia (loan)	7	(0)
2019–2023	PAOK	89	(10)
2023–2025	Nantes	53	(3)
2025–	Krasnodar	36	(2)

International career^{‡}
2016	Brazil U20	3	(0)
2019	Brazil U23	1	(0)
- * Club domestic league appearances and goals as of 22 November 2026 ‡ National team caps and goals as of 10 December 2019

Douglas Augusto Soares Gomes (born 13 January 1997) is a Brazilian professional footballer who plays as a midfielder for Russian Premier League club Krasnodar.

== Club career ==
=== Brazil ===
Born in Rio de Janeiro, Douglas joined Fluminense's youth setup in 2004, aged seven. On 6 September 2015, he made his first team – and Série A – debut, starting in a 3–1 home loss against rivals Flamengo.

Douglas became an undisputed starter during the 2016 season, renewing his contract until 2021 in February. He scored his first goal on 13 September of that year in a 4–2 home win against Atlético Mineiro.

=== PAOK ===
On 1 July 2019, PAOK announced the arrival of Douglas Augusto from Corinthians, signing a four-year contract. In January, Douglas was loaned by Corinthians to EC Bahia, and the 22-year-old subsequently made seven appearances for the latter in the 2019 Série A season. Last year, Douglas began the 2018 Série A season with Fluminense FC, but he later transferred to Corinthians for €1 million in the summer. For 2019–20 and 2020–21, he was a key member of the team. In the final for the Greek cup on 22 May 2021, PAOK faced Olympiacos, with PAOK winning 2–1.

=== Nantes ===
On 13 August 2023, Douglas joined French club Nantes after signing a four-year contract.

=== Krasnodar ===
On 12 July 2025, Douglas joined Krasnodar for €6.5 million and signed a three-year contract.

== International career ==
On 2 July 2021, Douglas Augusto was named in the Brazil squad for the 2020 Summer Olympics, but was forced to withdraw with a thigh injury.

== Career statistics ==
=== Club ===
As of 22 November 2026

Appearances and goals by club, season and competition
Club	Season	League			Cup		Continental		Other		Total	
Club	Season	Division	Apps	Goals	Apps	Goals	Apps	Goals	Apps	Goals	Apps	Goals
Fluminense	2015	Série A	3	0	1	0	0	0	0	0	4	0
Fluminense	2016	Série A	30	2	5	0	0	0	14 (Note: Four appearances in Primeira Liga (Brazil), ten appearances in Campeonato Carioca)	0	49	2
Fluminense	2017	Série A	14	1	6	0	3 (Note: Appearances in Copa Sudamericana)	0	9 (Note: One appearance in Primeira Liga (Brazil), eight appearances in Campeonato Carioca)	0	32	1
Fluminense	2018	Série A	6	0	0	0	1 (Note: Appearances in Copa Sudamericana)	0	8 (Note: Appearances in Campeonato Carioca)	1	15	1
Fluminense	Total		53	3	12	0	4	0	31	1	100	4
Corinthians	2018	Série A	15	1	4	0	2 (Note: Appearances in Copa Libertadores)	0	0	0	21	1
Bahia (loan)	2019	Série A	7	0	7	0	2 (Note: Appearances in Copa Sudamericana)	0	14 (Note: Six appearances in Copa do Nordeste, eight appearances in Campeonato Baiano)	0	30	0
PAOK	2019–20	Superleague Greece	18	2	1	0	3 (Note: One appearance in UEFA Champions League, two appearances in UEFA Europa League)	0	—		22	2
PAOK	2020–21	Superleague Greece	21	1	4	0	5 (Note: Appearances in UEFA Europa League)	0	—		30	1
PAOK	2021–22	Superleague Greece	21	3	6	0	10 (Note: Appearances in UEFA Europa Conference League)	1	—		37	4
PAOK	2022–23	Superleague Greece	29	4	5	1	2	0	—		36	5
PAOK	2023–24	Superleague Greece	—		—		1	0	—		1	0
PAOK	Total		89	10	16	1	21	1	—		126	12
Nantes	2023−24	Ligue 1	25	0	2	0	—		—		27	0
Nantes	2024–25	Ligue 1	28	3	2	0	—		—		30	3
Nantes	Total		53	3	4	0	—		—		57	3
Krasnodar	2025–26	Russian Premier League	24	2	11	3	—		—		35	5
Krasnodar	2026–27	Russian Premier League	12	0	2	0	—		—		14	0
Krasnodar	Total		36	2	13	3	0	0	0	0	49	5
Career total			253	19	56	4	29	1	45	1	383	25

== Honours ==
Fluminense

- Primeira Liga: 2016

PAOK

- Greek Cup: 2020–21
