= Kelvin Amian =

French footballer (born 1998)

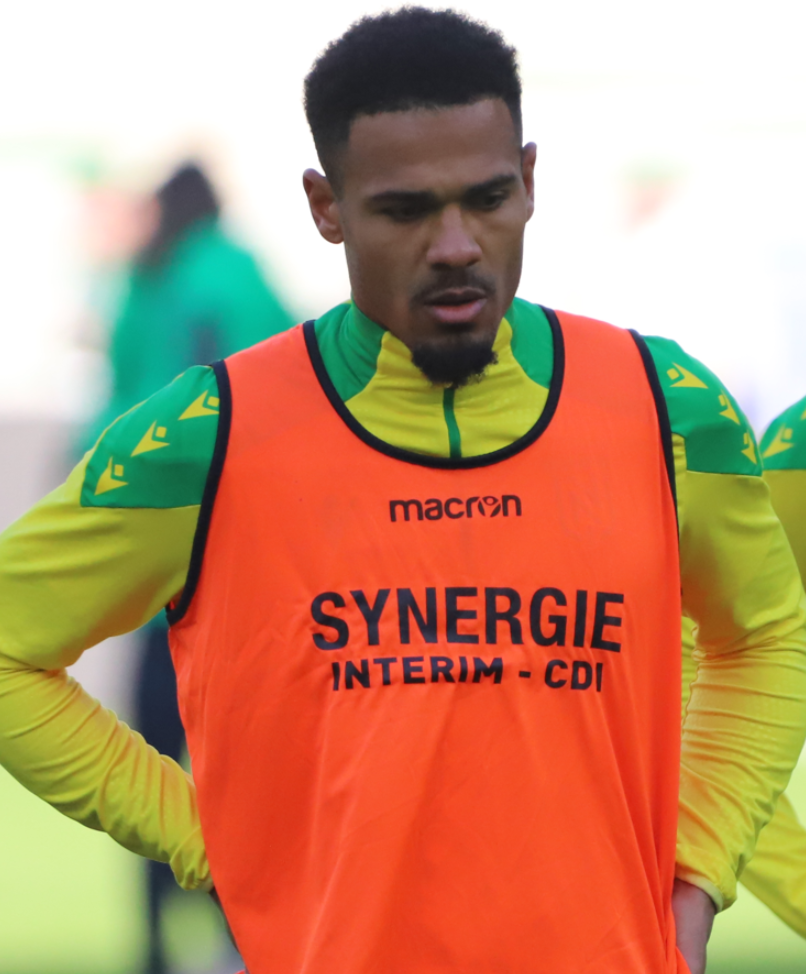
- Amian with Nantes in 2025

Personal information
- Full name: Kelvin Amian Adou
- Date of birth: 8 February 1998 (age 28)
- Place of birth: Toulouse, France
- Height: 1.80 m (5 ft 11 in)
- Position: Right-back

Team information
- Current team: Nantes
- Number: 98

Youth career
- 2005–2007: Balma SC
- 2007–2016: Toulouse

Senior career*
Years	Team	Apps	(Gls)
2014–2016	Toulouse B	22	(0)
2016–2021	Toulouse	144	(5)
2021–2024	Spezia	81	(1)
2024–	Nantes	65	(1)

International career^{‡}
2014–2015	France U17	6	(0)
2015	France U18	1	(0)
2016–2017	France U19	5	(0)
2017–2019	France U21	18	(1)
- * Club domestic league appearances and goals as of 5 April 2026 ‡ National team caps and goals as of 15 October 2019

Kelvin Amian Adou (born 8 February 1998) is a French professional footballer who plays as a right-back for Ligue 2 club Nantes.

== Club career ==
=== Toulouse ===
Amian is a youth exponent from Toulouse FC. He made his Ligue 1 debut on 14 August 2016 against Marseille playing the full game.

=== Spezia ===
On 23 July 2021, Amian signed with Serie A club Spezia on a five-year deal.

=== Nantes ===
On 25 January 2024, Amian joined Nantes on a 4.5-year contract.

== Personal life ==
Amian is of Ivorian descent.

== Career statistics ==
=== Club ===
As of match played 5 April 2026

Appearances and goals by club, season and competition
Club	Season	League			National cup		League cup		Europe		Other		Total	
Club	Season	Division	Apps	Goals	Apps	Goals	Apps	Goals	Apps	Goals	Apps	Goals	Apps	Goals
Toulouse	2016–17	Ligue 1	22	0	1	0	1	0	—		—		24	0
Toulouse	2017–18	Ligue 1	36	1	1	0	2	0	—		—		39	1
Toulouse	2018–19	Ligue 1	32	0	2	0	0	0	—		—		34	0
Toulouse	2019–20	Ligue 1	20	0	1	0	1	0	—		—		22	0
Toulouse	2020–21	Ligue 2	34	4	0	0	—		—		—		34	4
Toulouse	Total		144	5	5	0	4	0	0	0	0	0	153	5
Spezia	2021–22	Serie A	32	1	1	0	—		—		—		33	1
Spezia	2022–23	Serie A	30	0	2	0	—		—		—		32	0
Spezia	2023–24	Serie B	19	0	1	0	—		—		—		20	0
Spezia	Total		81	1	4	0	0	0	0	0	0	0	85	1
Nantes	2023–24	Ligue 1	12	0	0	0	—		—		—		12	0
Nantes	2024–25	Ligue 1	30	1	2	0	—		—		—		32	1
Nantes	2025–26	Ligue 1	23	0	2	0	—		—		—		25	0
Nantes	Total		65	1	4	0	—		—		—		69	1
Career total			290	7	13	0	4	0	0	0	0	0	307	7
