= Mostafa Mohamed (footballer) =

Egyptian footballer (born 1997)

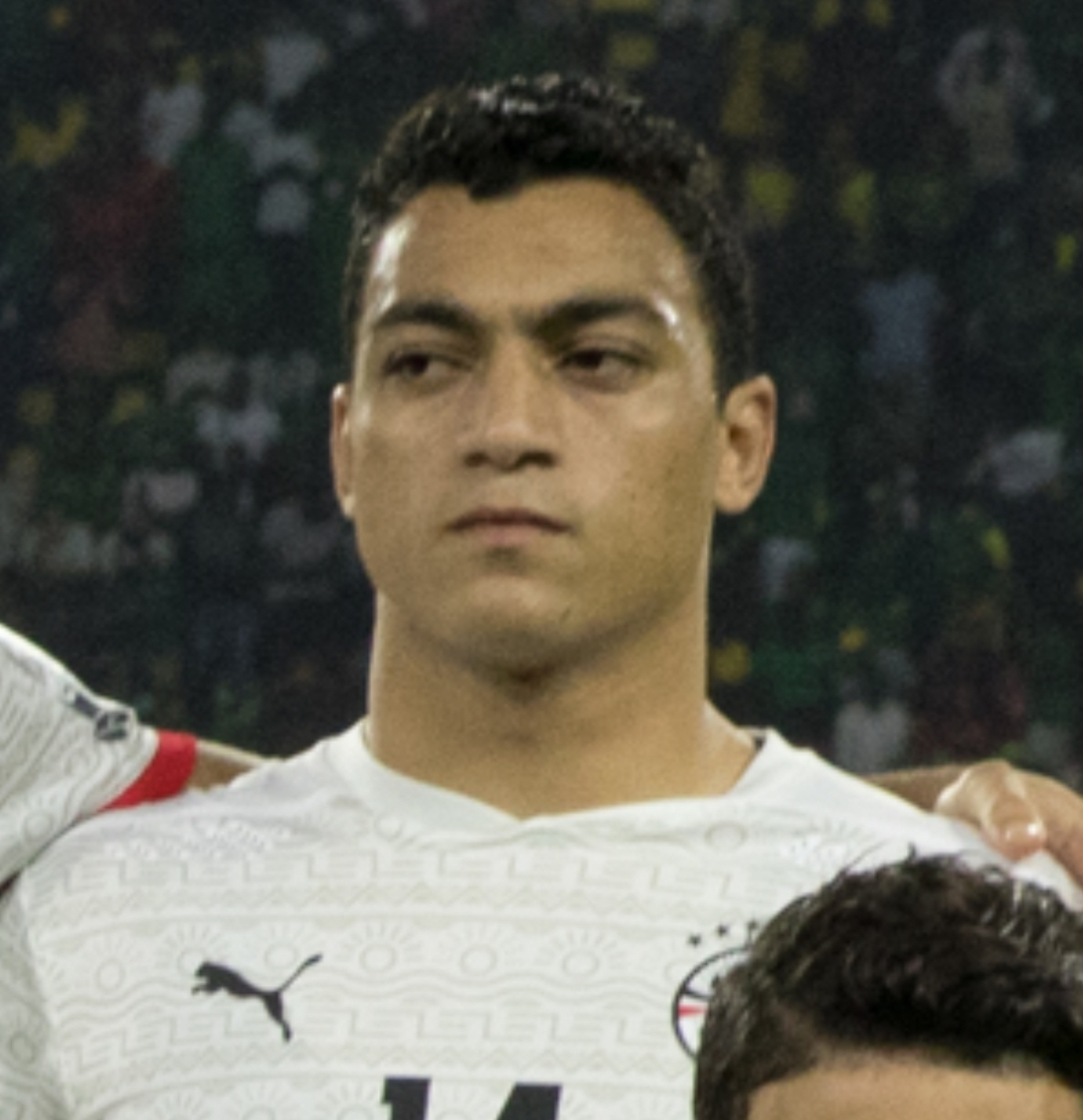
- Mohamed with Egypt in 2021

Personal information
- Full name: Mostafa Mohamed Ahmed Abdallah
- Date of birth: 28 November 1997 (age 28)
- Place of birth: Giza, Egypt
- Height: 1.85 m (6 ft 1 in)
- Position: Striker

Team information
- Current team: Konyaspor
- Number: 42

Youth career
- 2008–2016: Zamalek

Senior career*
Years	Team	Apps	(Gls)
2016–2021	Zamalek	33	(13)
2016–2017	→ El Dakhleya (loan)	16	(4)
2017–2018	→ Tanta (loan)	23	(7)
2018–2019	→ El Gaish (loan)	29	(12)
2021	→ Galatasaray (loan)	16	(8)
2021–2023	Galatasaray	27	(7)
2022–2023	→ Nantes (loan)	36	(8)
2023–2026	Nantes	82	(17)
2026–	Konyaspor	1	(0)

International career^{‡}
2017	Egypt U20	3	(1)
2019	Egypt U23	5	(4)
2019–	Egypt	61	(14)
Medal record
Representing Egypt
Men's football
Africa Cup of Nations
Runner-up	2021 Cameroon
Africa U-23 Cup of Nations
Winner	2019 Egypt
- * Club domestic league appearances and goals as of 5 September 2026 ‡ National team caps and goals as of 27 March 2026

Mostafa Mohamed Ahmed Abdallah (Egyptian Arabic: مصطفي محمد احمد عبد الله; born 28 November 1997) is an Egyptian professional footballer who plays as a striker for Süper Lig club Konyaspor and the Egypt national team.

== Club career ==
=== Zamalek ===
Mohamed started playing at the age of 11 with Zamalek, then had several loan spells at the beginning of his senior career. On 2 January 2020, he scored a goal in the 42nd minute for Zamalek upon his return against Aswan in the 11th round of the Egyptian League. Later that month, on 28 January, Mohamed scored a long-range goal in the 15th minute against Wadi Degla, which ended in a 1–1 draw.

=== Galatasaray ===
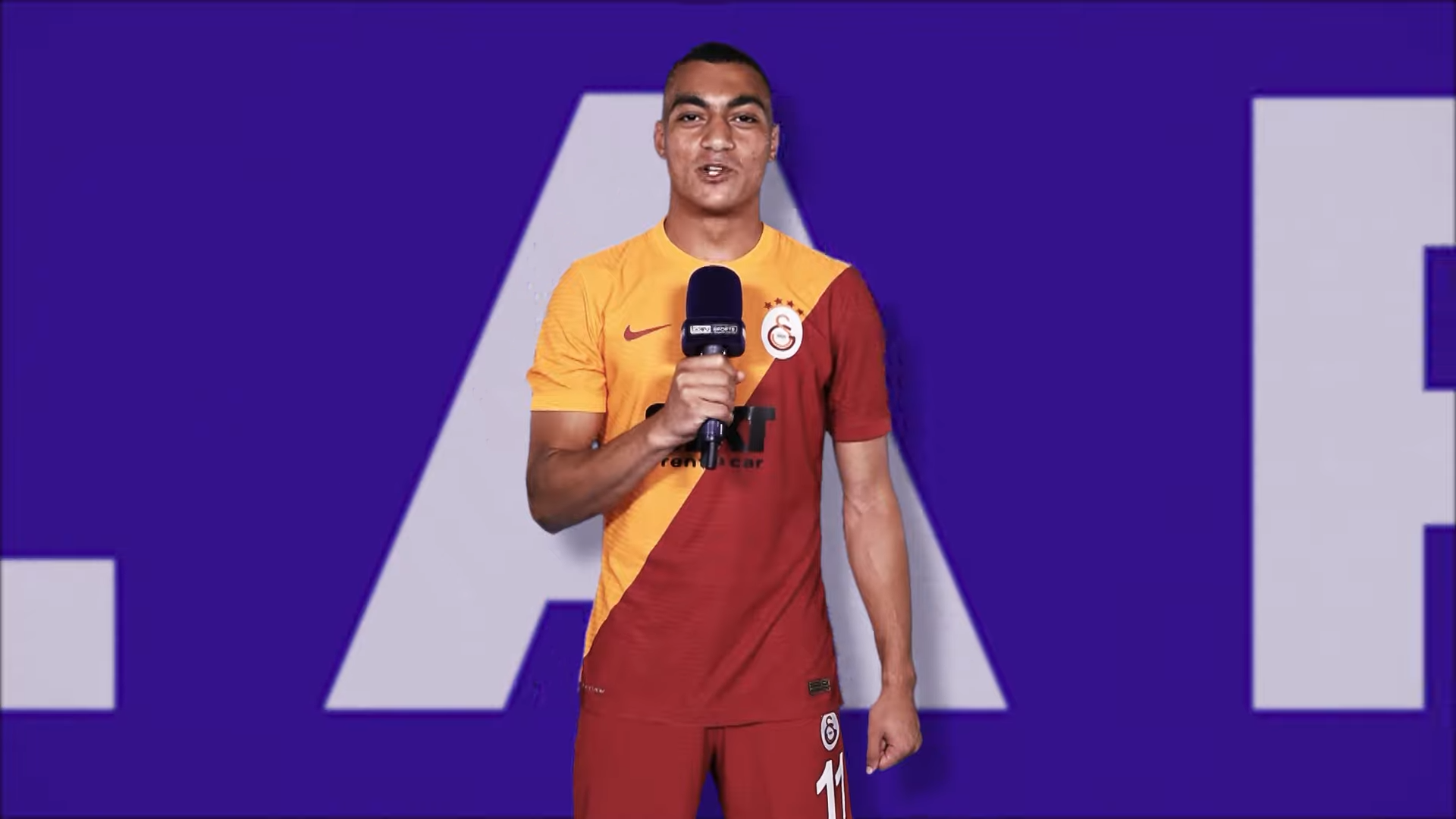
Mohamed with Galatasaray in 2021

On 1 February 2021, Süper Lig club Galatasaray signed Mohamed on a one-and-a-half-year loan for a reported fee of $2 million, with an option to buy for $4 million. He became the first Egyptian to sign for the Istanbul-based club.

Mohamed scored on his debut on 2 February, coming on as a 46th-minute substitute in a 3–0 Süper Lig win against İstanbul Başakşehir; he scored his side's third goal from a penalty. In his second game for Galatasaray, he scored the only goal in a 1–0 away win against Fenerbahçe in the 54th minute on 6 February.

On 27 December 2021, Galatasaray activated his redemption clause and he signed a contract until 2025.

=== Nantes ===
On 21 July 2022, Galatasaray announced that Mohamed was loaned out to French club Nantes for one year. On 28 August 2022, he scored his first Ligue 1 goal in a 3–1 win over Toulouse. On 8 September, he scored his first goal in European competitions in a 2–1 win over Olympiacos in the Europa League. After having failed to score in subsequent European competition matches, he returned to scoring on 3 November in the second leg against Olympiacos. With his goal he helped Nantes to reach the knockout round play-offs against Juventus.

On 7 January 2023, Mohamed made his debut in Coupe de France against AF Virois, scoring his first goal in the competition. He also helped his team in the next round against ES Thaon, by scoring the last penalty in a 4–2 win.

On 14 June 2023, the club exercised the option to make the move permanent, the striker signing a four-year deal with the French club. In July 2026, Mohamed was criticized by Nantes head coach Michel Der Zakarian after missing the club's pre-season training camp without permission. The striker, whose future at Nantes had been uncertain following the club's relegation to Ligue 2, had been linked with a possible transfer away from the French side, including interest from Egyptian clubs Zamalek and Pyramids FC.

=== Konyaspor ===
On 30 August 2026, Mohamed traveled to Turkey to complete his move to Konyaspor for €750,000.

== International career ==
=== Youth ===
Mohamed has played for both the Egypt U-20 team and the Egypt U-23 team, representing Egypt in the 2019 Africa U-23 Cup of Nations, scoring Egypt's opening goal of a 1–0 win over Mali in the group stage. He went on to score in his following two matches, one goal in a 3–2 win over Ghana, and two goals in a 2–1 win over Cameroon, with Egypt winning their first title by defeating Ivory Coast 2–1 in the final. Mohamed earned the tournament's golden boot.

=== Senior ===
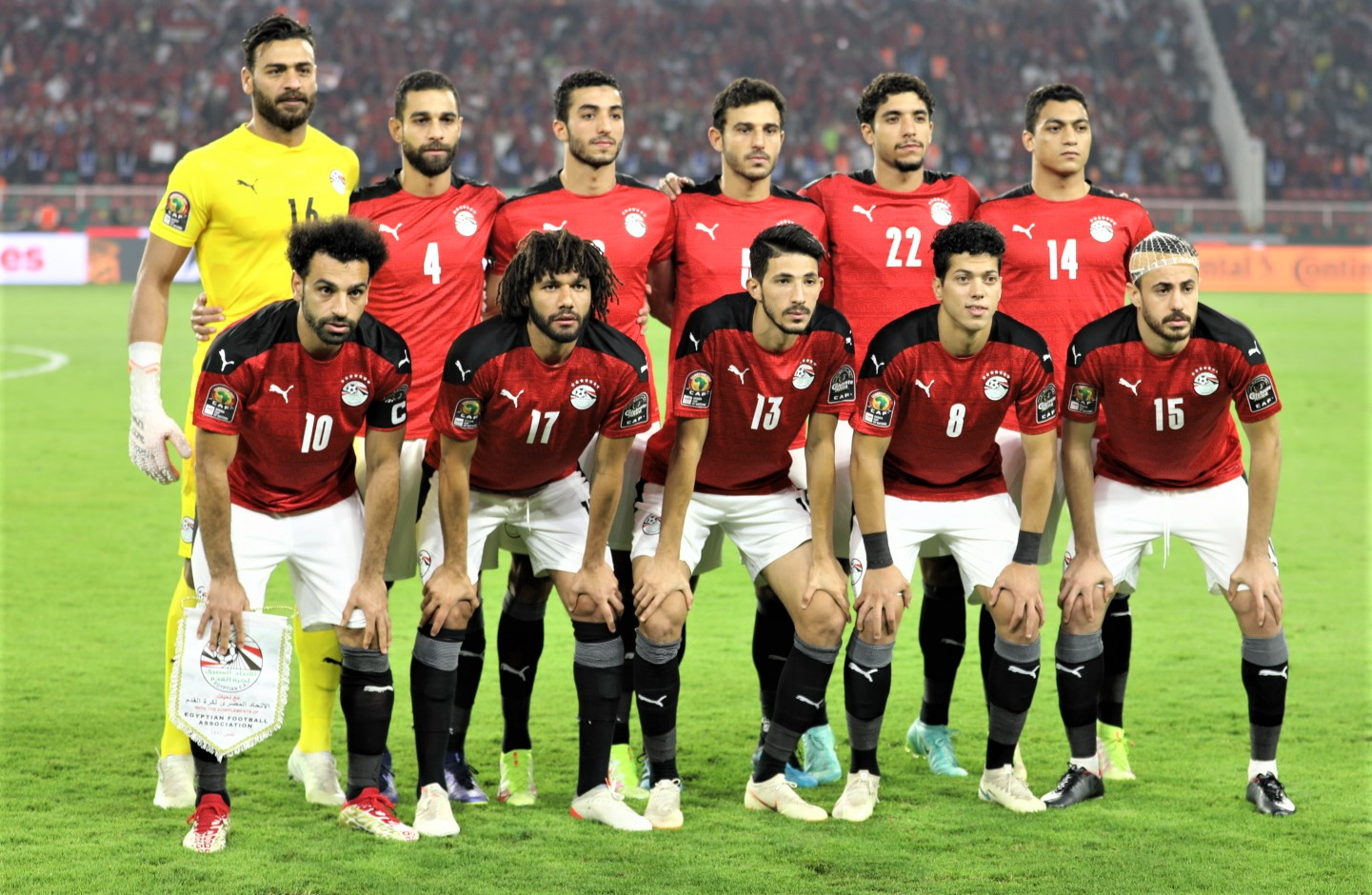
Mohamed (first standing from right) with the Egypt national football team at the 2021 Africa Cup of Nations

On 23 March 2019, Mohamed made his debut for the Egypt national team in the Africa Cup of Nations qualification, in a 1–1 away draw against Niger. On 5 September 2021, he scored his first senior international goal in a 1–1 draw against Gabon in 2022 FIFA World Cup qualification.

In January 2022, Mohamed was selected by coach Carlos Queiroz to participate in the 2021 Africa Cup of Nations. In December 2023, he was included in the list of twenty-seven Egyptian players chosen by Rui Vitória to take part in the 2023 Africa Cup of Nations.

== Controversies ==
On 14 May 2023, Mohamed refused to represent Nantes in a Ligue 1 match against Toulouse due to the game being a part of a league-wide campaign against homophobia and team uniforms featuring a rainbow-themed decoration. He was subsequently fined by his club, with the undisclosed amount being donated to anti-homophobia charity group SOS Homophobie. On 19 May 2024, Mohamed once again refused to play in a Ligue 1 match on the occasion of the league-wide campaign against homophobia. In May 2025, for the third year in a row, he once more refused to play and represent Nantes for the last match of the season, arguing that participating in the initiative was contrary to "his origins and his [Islamic] faith".

== Personal life ==
On 9 June 2020, Mohamed celebrated his wedding.

== Career statistics ==
=== Club ===
As of match played 26 April 2026

Appearances and goals by club, season and competition
Club	Season	League			National cup (Note: Includes Egypt Cup, Turkish Cup, Coupe de France)		Continental		Other		Total	
Club	Season	Division	Apps	Goals	Apps	Goals	Apps	Goals	Apps	Goals	Apps	Goals
Zamalek	2016–17	Egyptian Premier League	0	0	0	0	0	0	2 (Note: Appearances in Arab Club Champions Cup)	0	2	0
Zamalek	2017–18	Egyptian Premier League	0	0	0	0	0	0	1 (Note: Appearance in Egyptian Super Cup)	0	1	0
Zamalek	2019–20	Egyptian Premier League	29	11	2	0	10 (Note: Appearances in CAF Champions League)	9	2 (Note: One appearance in Egyptian Super Cup, one appearance in CAF Super Cup)	0	43	20
Zamalek	2020–21	Egyptian Premier League	4	2	0	0	0	0	—		4	2
Zamalek	Total		33	13	2	0	10	9	5	0	50	22
El Dakhleya (loan)	2016–17	Egyptian Premier League	16	3	0	0	—		—		16	3
Tanta (loan)	2017–18	Egyptian Premier League	23	6	0	0	—		—		23	6
Tala'ea El Gaish (loan)	2018–19	Egyptian Premier League	29	12	0	0	—		—		29	12
Galatasaray (loan)	2020–21	Süper Lig	16	8	1	1	0	0	—		17	9
Galatasaray	2021–22	Süper Lig	27	7	1	1	13 (Note: Two appearances in UEFA Champions League, eleven appearances in UEFA Europa League)	0	—		41	8
Galatasaray	Galatasaray total		43	15	2	2	13	0	0	0	58	17
Nantes (loan)	2022–23	Ligue 1	36	8	6	1	8 (Note: Appearances in UEFA Europa League)	2	1 (Note: Appearance in Trophée des Champions)	0	51	11
Nantes	2023–24	Ligue 1	29	8	0	0	—		—		29	8
Nantes	2024–25	Ligue 1	30	5	2	1	—		—		32	6
Nantes	2025–26	Ligue 1	23	4	0	0	—		—		23	4
Nantes	Nantes total		118	25	8	2	8	2	1	0	135	29
Career total			262	74	12	4	31	11	6	0	311	89

=== International ===
As of match played 27 March 2026

Appearances and goals by national team and year
National team	Year	Apps	Goals
Egypt	2019	2	0
Egypt	2020	2	0
Egypt	2021	5	2
Egypt	2022	14	4
Egypt	2023	9	2
Egypt	2024	13	5
Egypt	2025	11	1
Egypt	2026	5	0
Total		61	14

Scores and results list Egypt's goal tally first, score column indicates score after each Mohamed goal.

List of international goals scored by Mostafa Mohamed
No.	Date	Venue	Opponent	Score	Result	Competition	Ref.
1	5 September 2021	Stade de Franceville, Franceville, Gabon	Gabon	1–1	1–1	2022 FIFA World Cup qualification	
2	11 October 2021	Benina Martyrs Stadium, Benina, Libya	Libya	2–0	3–0	2022 FIFA World Cup qualification	
3	5 June 2022	Cairo International Stadium, Cairo, Egypt	Guinea	1–0	1–0	2023 Africa Cup of Nations qualification	
4	14 June 2022	Seoul World Cup Stadium, Seoul, South Korea	South Korea	1–2	1–4	Friendly	
5	23 September 2022	Alexandria Stadium, Alexandria, Egypt	Niger	2–0	3–0	Friendly	
6	18 November 2022	Jaber Al-Ahmad International Stadium, Kuwait City, Kuwait	Belgium	1–0	2–1	Friendly	
7	14 June 2023	Marrakesh Stadium, Marrakesh, Morocco	Guinea	2–1	2–1	2023 Africa Cup of Nations qualification	
8	16 November 2023	Cairo International Stadium, Cairo, Egypt	Djibouti	5–0	6–0	2026 FIFA World Cup qualification	
9	14 January 2024	Felix Houphouet Boigny Stadium, Abidjan, Ivory Coast	Mozambique	1–0	2–2	2023 Africa Cup of Nations	
10	18 January 2024	Felix Houphouet Boigny Stadium, Abidjan, Ivory Coast	Ghana	2–2	2–2	2023 Africa Cup of Nations	
11	22 January 2024	Felix Houphouet Boigny Stadium, Abidjan, Ivory Coast	Cape Verde	2–1	2–2	2023 Africa Cup of Nations	
12	28 January 2024	Laurent Pokou Stadium, San-Pédro, Ivory Coast	DR Congo	1–1	1–1	2023 Africa Cup of Nations	
13	22 March 2024	New Administrative Capital Stadium, New Administrative Capital, Egypt	New Zealand	1–0	1–0	Friendly	
14	16 December 2025	Cairo International Stadium, Cairo, Egypt	Nigeria	2–1	2–1	Friendly	

== Honours ==
Zamalek

- Egypt Cup: 2019
- Egyptian Super Cup: 2019–20
- CAF Super Cup: 2020
- CAF Champions League runner-up: 2019–20

Egypt U23

- Africa U-23 Cup of Nations: 2019

Egypt

- Africa Cup of Nations runner-up: 2021

Individual

- Africa U-23 Cup of Nations Golden Boot: 2019
