= Yassine Benhattab =

French footballer (born 2002)

Personal information
- Date of birth: 18 November 2002 (age 23)
- Place of birth: Marseille, France
- Height: 1.70 m (5 ft 7 in)
- Position: Winger

Team information
- Current team: Montpellier
- Number: 10

Youth career
- Belsunce
- Marseille
- Niort

Senior career*
Years	Team	Apps	(Gls)
2020–2022	Niort B	8	(1)
2020	Niort	1	(0)
2022–2024	Aubagne	25	(0)
2024–2026	Nantes	10	(0)
2024–2025	→ Aubagne (loan)	30	(7)
2026	→ Reims (loan)	12	(0)
2026–	Montpellier	0	(0)
- * Club domestic league appearances and goals as of 5 September 2026

Yassine Benhattab (born 18 November 2002) is a French professional footballer who plays as a winger for Ligue 2 club Montpellier.

== Club career ==
Benhattab is a youth product of Belsunce, Marseille, and Niort. He made his professional debut with Niort in a 1–0 Ligue 2 loss to Troyes on 18 December 2020. In June 2021, he was offered a one-year aspirant contract with Niort.

On 30 August 2024, Benhattab signed for Ligue 1 club Nantes, before being immediately loaned back to Aubagne for the rest of the season.

On 9 January 2026, Benhattab was sent on loan to Ligue 2 club Reims until the end of the 2025–26 season, with an optional buy-clause.

== International career ==
In June 2023, he took part in the Maurice Revello Tournament in France with the mediterranean selection.

== Personal life ==
Born in France, Benhattab is of Algerian descent.

== Career statistics ==
As of match played 12 December 2025

Appearances and goals by club, season and competition
Club	Season	League			Cup		Europe		Other		Total	
Club	Season	Division	Apps	Goals	Apps	Goals	Apps	Goals	Apps	Goals	Apps	Goals
Niort B	2019–20	National 3	2	0	—		—		—		2	0
Niort B	2020–21	National 3	2	1	—		—		—		2	1
Niort B	2021–22	National 3	4	0	—		—		—		4	0
Niort B	Total		8	1	—		—		—		8	1
Niort	2020–21	Ligue 2	1	0	—		—		—		1	0
Aubagne	2022–23	CFA 2	7	0	1	0	—		—		8	0
Aubagne	2023–24	CFA 2	15	0	0	0	—		—		15	0
Aubagne	Total		22	0	1	0	—		—		23	0
Nantes	2024–25	Ligue 1	0	0	0	0	—		—		0	0
Nantes	2025–26	Ligue 1	10	0	0	0	—		—		10	0
Nantes	Total		10	0	0	0	0	0	0	0	10	0
Aubagne (loan)	2024–25	CFA	30	7	—		—		—		30	7
Career total			70	8	1	0	0	0	0	0	71	8
