= Matthis Abline =

French footballer (born 2003)

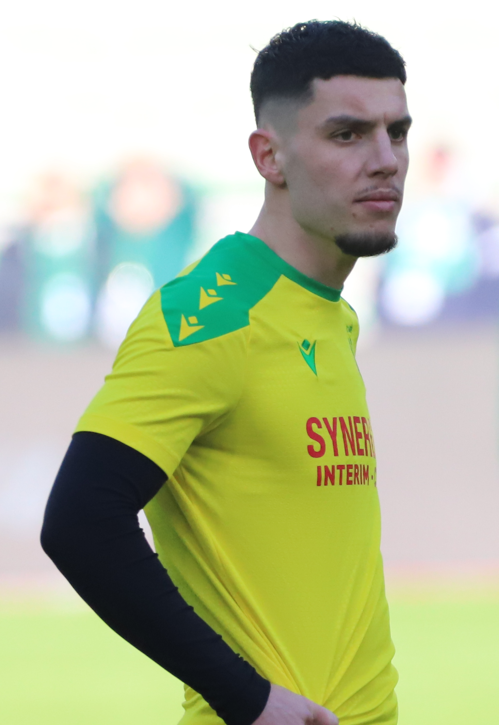
- Abline with Nantes in 2025

Personal information
- Date of birth: 28 March 2003 (age 23)
- Place of birth: Angers, France
- Height: 1.82 m (6 ft 0 in)
- Position: Forward

Team information
- Current team: Monaco
- Number: 11

Youth career
- 2009–2014: Landemontais
- 2014–2018: Carquefou
- 2018–2020: Rennes

Senior career*
Years	Team	Apps	(Gls)
2020–2021	Rennes B	9	(4)
2021–2024	Rennes	19	(1)
2022	→ Le Havre (loan)	16	(6)
2023	→ Auxerre (loan)	19	(2)
2023–2024	→ Nantes (loan)	22	(5)
2024–2026	Nantes	65	(15)
2026–	Monaco	6	(1)

International career^{‡}
2019	France U16	7	(4)
2019–2020	France U17	7	(5)
2021–2022	France U19	11	(6)
2022–2024	France U20	10	(5)
2022–2025	France U21	10	(2)
- * Club domestic league appearances and goals as of 18 October 2026 ‡ National team caps and goals as of 25 June 2025

Matthis Abline (born 28 March 2003) is a French professional footballer who plays as a forward for Ligue 1 club Monaco.

== Early life ==
Abline was born in Angers and grew up in Landemont in the Loire Valley.

== Club career ==
On 20 August 2020, Abline signed his first professional contract with Rennes. He made his professional debut for Rennes on 25 April 2021 in a 5–1 Ligue 1 win against Dijon. He scored his first goal against Rosenborg in the 2021–22 UEFA Europa Conference League play-off round.

On 21 January 2022, Abline joined Le Havre on loan until the end of the season. On 25 August 2023, he signed for Ligue 1 club Nantes on a season-long loan with an option-to-buy for €6 million. On 3 July 2024, he signed for Nantes on a permanent deal for a club-record fee of €12 million (including bonuses), signing a four-year contract.

On 30 July 2026, Abline signed a five-year contract with Monaco. The transfer fee was reported to be in the region of 30 million euros, which became a new record-highest sale by Nantes.

== Career statistics ==
As of match played 18 October 2026

Appearances by club, season and competition
Club	Season	League			Coupe de France		Europe		Total	
Club	Season	Division	Apps	Goals	Apps	Goals	Apps	Goals	Apps	Goals
Rennes B	2020–21	CFA 2	6	2	—		—		6	2
Rennes B	2021–22	CFA 2	3	2	—		—		3	2
Rennes B	Total		9	4	—		—		9	4
Rennes	2020–21	Ligue 1	1	0	0	0	—		1	0
Rennes	2021–22	Ligue 1	7	0	0	0	2 (Note: Appearances in UEFA Conference League)	1	9	1
Rennes	2022–23	Ligue 1	11	1	0	0	4 (Note: Appearances in UEFA Europa League)	1	15	2
Rennes	Total		19	1	0	0	6	2	25	3
Le Havre (loan)	2021–22	Ligue 2	16	6	0	0	—		16	6
Auxerre (loan)	2022–23	Ligue 1	19	2	3	1	—		22	3
Nantes (loan)	2023–24	Ligue 1	22	5	2	0	—		24	5
Nantes	2024–25	Ligue 1	34	9	2	2	—		36	11
Nantes	2025–26	Ligue 1	31	6	2	2	—		33	8
Nantes	Total		65	15	4	4	—		69	19
Monaco	2026–27	Ligue 1	6	1	0	0	1	0	7	1
Career total			156	34	9	5	7	2	172	41
