= Adel Mahamoud =

Footballer (born 2003)

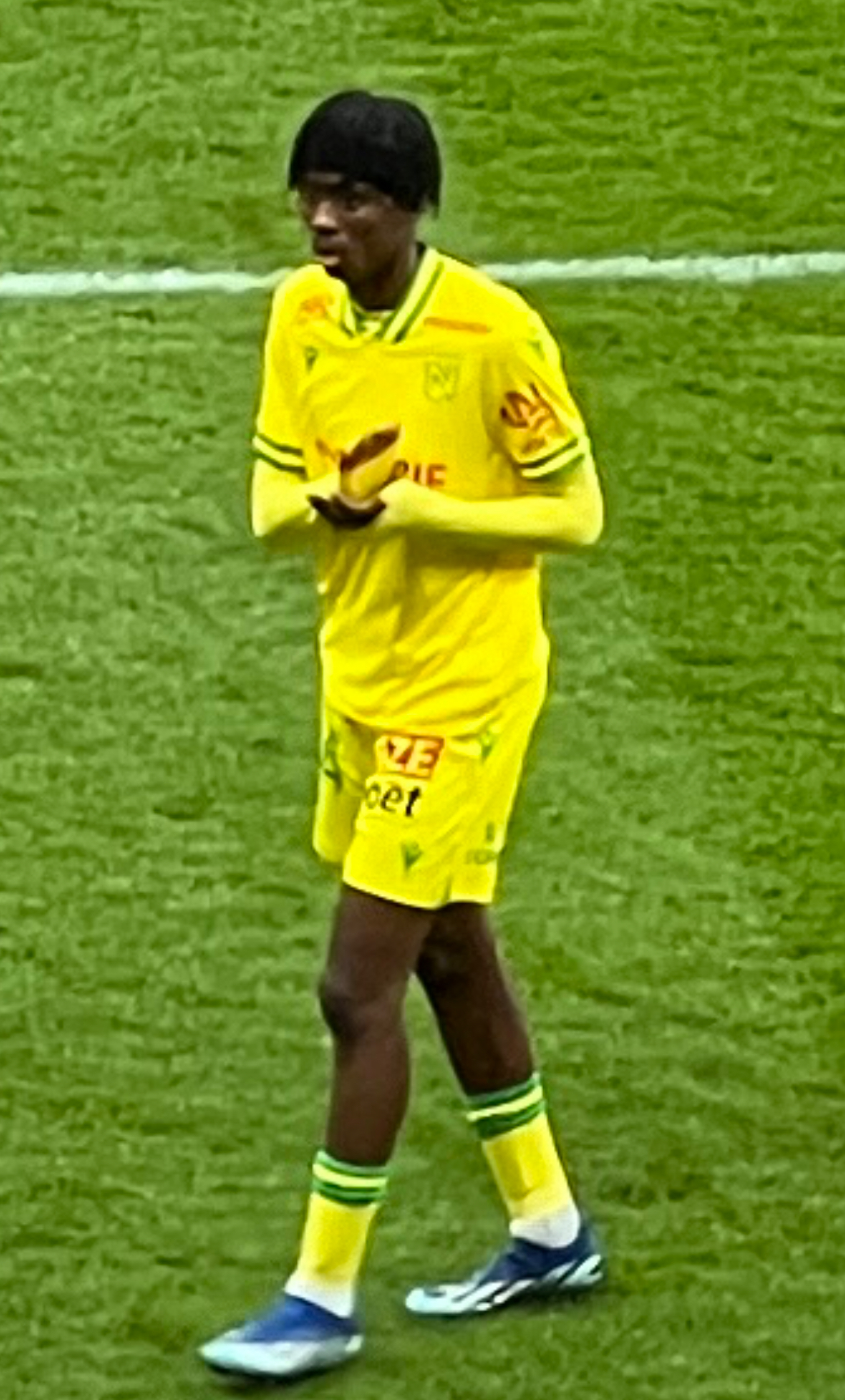
- Mahamoud in 2024

Personal information
- Date of birth: 4 February 2003 (age 23)
- Place of birth: Juvisy-sur-Orge, France
- Height: 1.75 m (5 ft 9 in)
- Position: Forward

Team information
- Current team: SAS Épinal
- Number: 14

Youth career
- Viry-Châtillon
- 2018–2022: Nantes

Senior career*
Years	Team	Apps	(Gls)
2021–2026	Nantes B	63	(11)
2024–2026	Nantes	1	(0)
2026–	SAS Épinal	6	(0)

International career^{‡}
2022	Comoros U20	1	(0)
2022–	Comoros	13	(1)
- * Club domestic league appearances and goals as of 16 May 2026 ‡ National team caps and goals as of 28 March 2026

Adel Mahamoud (born 4 February 2003) is a professional footballer who plays as a forward for Championnat National 1 club SAS Épinal. Born in France, he plays for the Comoros national team.

== Club career ==
Mahamoud is a youth product of Viry-Châtillon and Nantes. He was promoted to Nantes reserves in 2021 in the Championnat National 2.

== International career ==
Born in France, Mahamoud is Comorian descent. He represented the Comoros U20 at the 2022 Maurice Revello Tournament. He was called up to the senior Comoros national team for a set of friendlies in September 2022. He made his debut with Comoros as a late substitute in a 1–0 friendly loss to Tunisia on 22 September 2022.

== Career statistics ==
=== Club ===
As of match played 17 May 2025

Appearances and goals by club, season and competition
Club	Season	League			Cup		Europe		Total	
Club	Season	Division	Apps	Goals	Apps	Goals	Apps	Goals	Apps	Goals
Nantes B	2021–22	CFA 2	14	2	—		—		14	2
Nantes B	2022–23	CFA 2	24	3	—		—		24	3
Nantes B	2023–24	National 3	12	3	—		—		12	3
Nantes B	2024–25	National 3	10	3	—		—		10	3
Nantes B	2025–26	National 3	0	0	—		—		0	0
Nantes B	Total		60	11	—		—		60	11
Nantes	2023–24	Ligue 1	1	0	1	0	—		2	0
Nantes	2025–26	Ligue 1	0	0	0	0	—		0	0
Nantes	Total		1	0	1	0	—		2	0
Career total			61	11	1	0	0	0	62	11

=== International ===
As of match played 25 March 2025

Appearances and goals by national team and year
National team	Year	Apps	Goals
Comoros	2022	1	0
Comoros	2023	3	1
Comoros	2024	3	0
Comoros	2025	2	0
Total		9	1

Scores and results list the Comoros' goal tally first.

No.	Date	Venue	Opponent	Score	Result	Competition
1.	17 October 2023	Stade Parsemain, Fos-sur-Mer, France	Cape Verde	1–1	2–1	Friendly

== Honours ==
Nantes U19

- Championnat National U19: 2021–22
