= Jean-Charles Castelletto =

Footballer (born 1995)

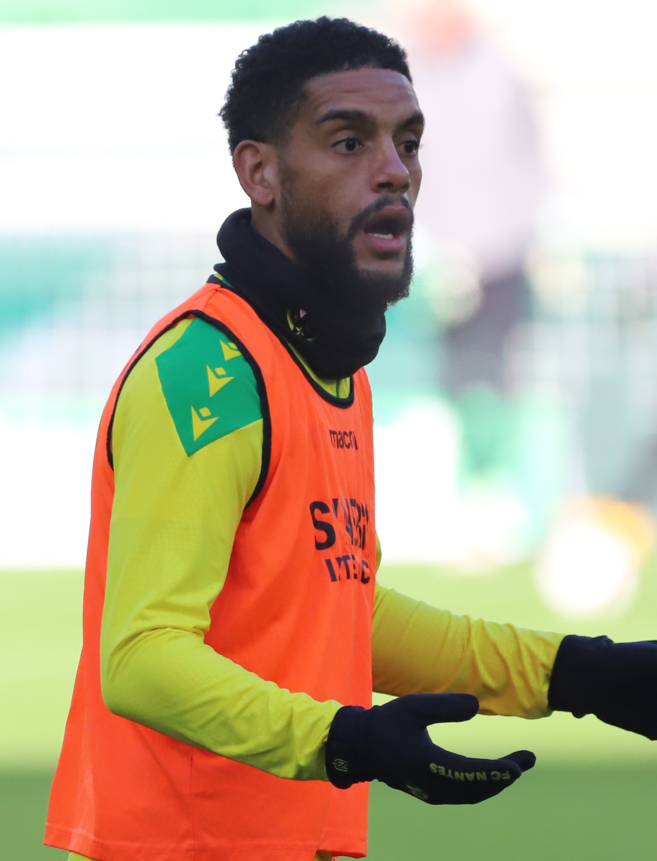
- Castelletto with Nantes in 2025

Personal information
- Full name: Jean-Charles Victor Castelletto
- Date of birth: 26 January 1995 (age 31)
- Place of birth: Clamart, France
- Height: 1.86 m (6 ft 1 in)
- Position: Centre-back

Team information
- Current team: Al Duhail
- Number: 21

Youth career
- 2002–2010: Brétigny Foot
- 2010–2012: Auxerre

Senior career*
Years	Team	Apps	(Gls)
2012–2013	Auxerre II	20	(0)
2013–2015	Auxerre	48	(1)
2015–2017	Club Brugge	3	(0)
2016	→ Mouscron-Péruwelz (loan)	10	(0)
2016–2017	→ Red Star (loan)	32	(2)
2017–2020	Brest	86	(5)
2020–2025	Nantes	142	(4)
2025–	Al Duhail	25	(1)

International career^{‡}
2010–2011	France U16	9	(1)
2011–2012	France U17	10	(0)
2013	France U18	1	(0)
2013	France U19	2	(0)
2014	France U20	3	(0)
2017–	Cameroon	35	(2)
Medal record
Men's football
Representing Cameroon
Africa Cup of Nations
Third place	2021 Cameroon
- * Club domestic league appearances and goals as of 3 November 2026 ‡ National team caps and goals as of 13 November 2025

Jean-Charles Victor Castelletto (born 26 January 1995) is a professional footballer who plays as a centre-back for Qatar Stars League club Al Duhail. Born in France, he plays for the Cameroon national team.

== Club career ==
In July 2016, Castelletto joined Red Star on a season-long loan from Belgian side Club Brugge KV.

=== Nantes ===
FC Nantes officially arrives on 26 May 2020. He initialled a three-year contract with the Nantes until 2023. In the opening of the 2021–2022 season, he equalised on corner against AS Monaco, allowing FC Nantes to take a point in Principality.

On 7 May 2022, he was a holder in the final and won the French Cup with FC Nantes.

In February 2024, his contract with FC Nantes was extended by two seasons to June 2028.

== International career ==
Castelletto was a youth international for France. Castelletto made his debut for the Cameroon national team in a 2018 FIFA World Cup qualification 2–2 tie with Zambia on 11 November 2017.

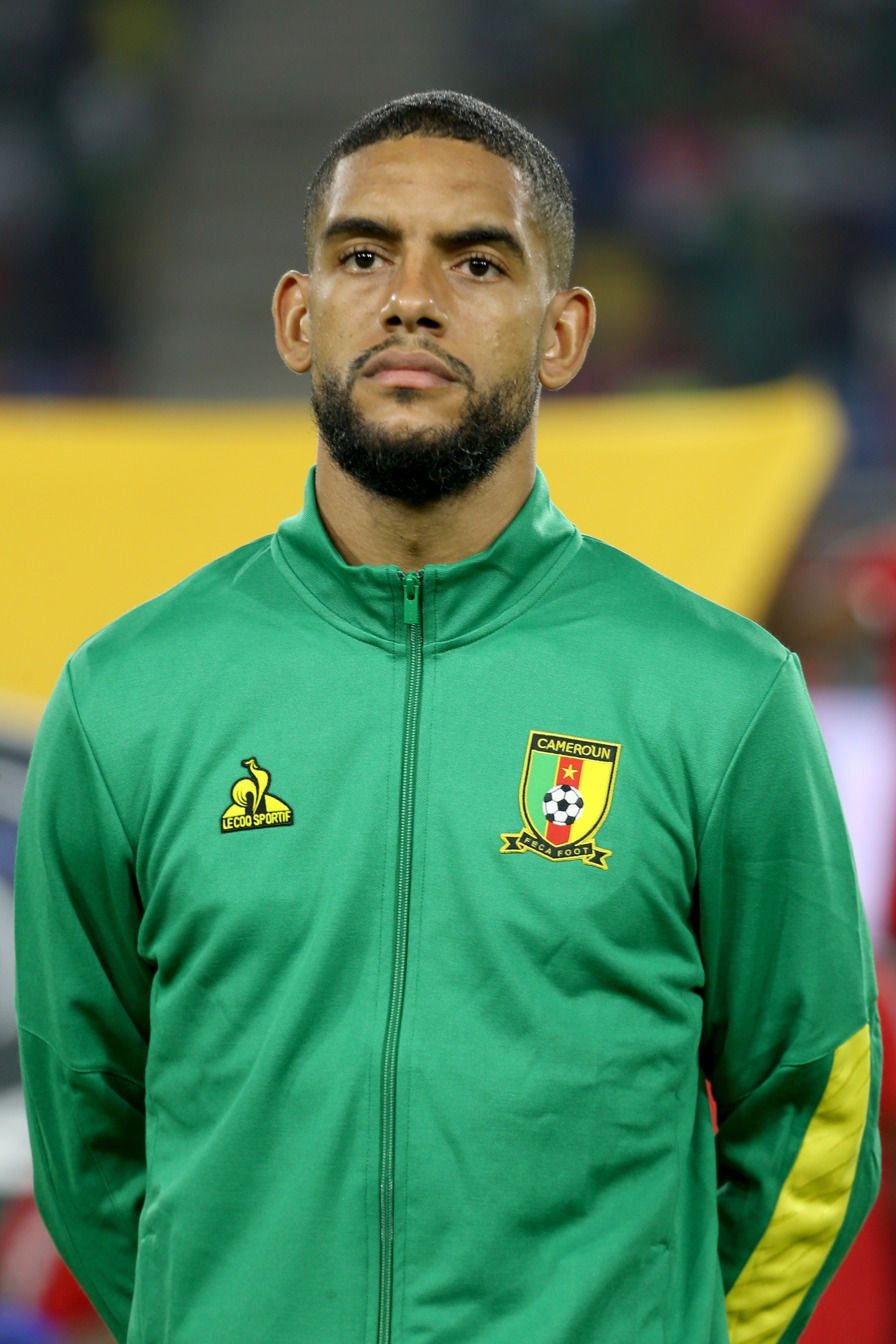
Castelletto with Cameroon at the 2021 Africa Cup of Nations

He was called up to Cameroon's squad for the 2022 FIFA World Cup. In their group stage match against Serbia on 28 November 2022, he scored his first international goal to lead for his team.

On 28 December 2023, he was selected from the list of 27 Cameroonian players selected to compete in the 2023 Africa Cup of Nations.

== Personal life ==
Castelletto was born in France to an Italian father and Cameroonian mother.

== Career statistics ==
=== Club ===
As of match played 8 November 2025

Appearances and goals by club, season and competition
Club	Season	League			National Cup		League Cup		Europe		Other		Total	
Club	Season	Division	Apps	Goals	Apps	Goalss	Apps	Goals	Apps	Goals	Apps	Goals	Apps	Goals
Auxerre II	2012–13	Championnat National 2	14	0	—		—		—		—		14	0
Auxerre II	2013–14	Championnat National 3	6	0	—		—		—		—		6	0
Auxerre II	Total		20	0	—		—		—		—		20	0
Auxerre	2012–13	Ligue 2	1	0	0	0	0	0	—		—		1	0
Auxerre	2013–14	Ligue 2	19	0	3	0	1	0	—		—		23	0
Auxerre	2014–15	Ligue 2	28	1	5	0	1	0	—		—		34	1
Auxerre	Total		48	1	8	0	2	0	0	0	0	0	58	1
Club Brugge	2015–16	Pro League	3	0	0	0	—		1 (Note: Appearance in the Champions League)	0	—		4	0
Mouscron (loan)	2015–16	Pro League	10	0	0	0	—		—		—		10	0
Red Star (loan)	2016–17	Ligue 2	32	2	1	0	1	0	—		—		34	2
Brest	2017–18	Ligue 2	33	2	1	0	1	0	—		—		35	2
Brest	2018–19	Ligue 2	31	2	2	0	2	1	—		—		35	3
Brest	2019–20	Ligue 1	22	1	1	0	1	0	—		—		24	1
Brest	Total		86	5	4	0	4	1	0	0	0	0	94	6
Nantes	2020–21	Ligue 1	24	1	1	0	—		—		2 (Note: Appearance in the relegation playoff)	0	27	2
Nantes	2021–22	Ligue 1	28	1	3	0	—		—		—		31	1
Nantes	2022–23	Ligue 1	32	0	6	0	—		7 (Note: Appearance in the Europa League)	0	1 (Note: Appearance in the Trophée des Champions)	0	46	0
Nantes	2023–24	Ligue 1	28	2	0	0	—		—		—		28	0
Nantes	2024–25	Ligue 1	30	0	1	0	—		—		—		31	0
Nantes	Total		142	4	11	0	0	0	7	0	3	0	163	4
Nantes II	2024–25	Championnat National 3	1	0	—		—		—		—		1	0
Al-Duhail	2025–26	Qatar Stars League	8	0	0	0	—		5 (Note: Appearance in AFC Champions League Elite)	0	—		13	0
Career total			350	12	24	0	7	1	13	0	3	0	397	12

=== International ===
As of match played 13 November 2025

Appearances and goals by national team and year
National team	Year	Apps	Goals
Cameroon	2017	1	0
Cameroon	2020	2	0
Cameroon	2021	1	0
Cameroon	2022	12	1
Cameroon	2023	6	0
Cameroon	2024	8	1
Cameroon	2025	5	0
Total		35	2

Scores and results list Cameroon's goal tally first, score column indicates score after each Castelletto goal.

List of international goals scored by Jean-Charles Castelletto
No.	Date	Venue	Cap	Opponent	Score	Result	Competition
1	28 November 2022	Al Janoub Stadium, Al Wakrah, Qatar	16	Serbia	1–0	3–3	2022 FIFA World Cup
2	19 January 2024	Charles Konan Banny Stadium, Yamoussoukro, Ivory Coast	25	Senegal	1–2	1–3	2023 Africa Cup of Nations

== Honours ==
Nantes

- Coupe de France: 2021–22

Cameroon

- Third Place AFCON Tournament 2021-22.
