= 2023–24 FC Nantes season =

FC Nantes
2023–24 season
- Owner: Waldemar Kita
- President: Waldemar Kita
- Head coach: Pierre Aristouy (until 28 November); Jocelyn Gourvennec (from 29 November)
- Stadium: Stade de la Beaujoire
- Ligue 1: 14th
- Coupe de France: Round of 32
- Top goalscorer: League: Mostafa Mohamed (8); All: Mostafa Mohamed (8)
| Home colours | Away colours |

The 2023–24 season was FC Nantes's 81st season in existence and 11th consecutive season in Ligue 1. They also competed in the Coupe de France.

== Players ==
=== First-team squad ===
As of 7 February 2024

Note: Flags indicate national team as defined under FIFA eligibility rules; some limited exceptions apply. Players may hold more than one non-FIFA nationality.

| No. | Pos. | Nation | Player |
|---|---|---|---|
| 1 | GK | FRA | Alban Lafont |
| 2 | DF | HAI | Jean-Kévin Duverne |
| 3 | DF | FRA | Nicolas Cozza (on loan from VfL Wolfsburg) |
| 4 | DF | FRA | Nicolas Pallois |
| 5 | MF | ESP | Pedro Chirivella (captain) |
| 6 | MF | BRA | Douglas Augusto |
| 7 | FW | CMR | Ignatius Ganago |
| 8 | MF | COD | Samuel Moutoussamy |
| 11 | MF | GLP | Marcus Coco |
| 12 | FW | FRA | Kader Bamba |
| 15 | FW | ZIM | Tino Kadewere (on loan from Lyon) |
| 16 | GK | FRA | Rémy Descamps |
| 17 | MF | FRA | Moussa Sissoko |

| No. | Pos. | Nation | Player |
|---|---|---|---|
| 19 | MF | FRA | Mohamed Achi |
| 21 | DF | CMR | Jean-Charles Castelletto |
| 22 | DF | FRA | Yannis M'Bemba |
| 23 | MF | FRA | Stredair Appuah |
| 24 | DF | SUI | Eray Cömert (on loan from Valencia) |
| 25 | MF | FRA | Florent Mollet |
| 27 | MF | NGR | Moses Simon |
| 30 | GK | SLO | Denis Petrić |
| 31 | FW | EGY | Mostafa Mohamed |
| 39 | FW | FRA | Matthis Abline (on loan from Rennes) |
| 44 | DF | FRA | Nathan Zézé |
| 71 | DF | FRA | Hugo Boutsingkham |
| 77 | FW | CIV | Bénie Traoré (on loan from Sheffield United) |
| 98 | DF | FRA | Kelvin Amian |

== Transfers ==
=== In ===
| Pos. | Player | Transferred from | Fee | Date | Source |
|---|---|---|---|---|---|
| FW | (Egypt) Mostafa Mohamed | (Turkey) Galatasaray | €5,750,000 | 1 July 2023 | |
| FW | (Algeria) Andy Delort | (France) Nice | €5,000,000 | 1 July 2023 | |
| MF | (Senegal) Lamine Diack | (Turkey) MKE Ankaragücü | Loan + €400,000 | 31 July 2023 | |
| MF | (Brazil) Douglas Augusto | (Greece) PAOK | €5,500,000 | 12 August 2023 | |
| MF | (Brazil) Adson | (Brazil) Corinthians | €6,000,000 | 23 August 2023 | |
| FW | (France) Matthis Abline | (France) Rennes | Loan | 25 August 2023 | |
| DF | (Senegal) Kelvin Amian | (Italy) Spezia | €3,000,000 | 25 January 2024 | |
| MF | (Senegal) Lamine Diack | (Turkey) MKE Ankaragücü | €2,000,000 | 31 January 2024 | |
| DF | (France) Nicolas Cozza | (Germany) VfL Wolfsburg | Loan | 1 February 2024 | |
| FW | (Zimbabwe) Tino Kadewere | (France) Lyon | Free | 14 May 2024 | |

=== Out ===
| Pos. | Player | Transferred to | Fee | Date | Source |
|---|---|---|---|---|---|
| MF | (France) Ludovic Blas | (France) Rennes | €15,000,000 | 5 July 2023 | |
| FW | (Algeria) Andy Delort | (Qatar) Umm Salal | €2,500,000 | 10 July 2023 | |
| DF | (Brazil) Andrei Girotto | (Saudi Arabia) Al-Taawoun | €4,000,000 | 6 August 2023 | |
| MF | (Brazil) Adson | (Brazil) Vasco da Gama | €5,000,000 | 24 January 2024 | |
| MF | (France) Quentin Merlin | (France) Marseille | €12,000,000 | 26 January 2024 | |
| DF | (France) Fabien Centonze | (Italy) Hellas Verona | Loan | 1 February 2024 | |
| MF | (Senegal) Lamine Diack | (United States) Colorado Rapids | Loan | 1 February 2024 | |
| DF | (France) Ronaël Pierre-Gabriel | (Croatia) Dinamo Zagreb | Free | 7 February 2024 | |
| MF | (France) Lohann Doucet | (France) Paris FC | €300,000 | 23 May 2024 | |

== Pre-season and friendlies ==
Win Draw Loss Fixtures

| 15 July 2023 Friendly | Nantes | 0–3 | Laval |
| 18:00 CEST (UTC+2) |

| 23 July 2023 Friendly | Nantes | 1–0 | Angers | Basse-Goulaine |
| 17:00 CEST (UTC+2) | Mohamed 75' (pen.) | Report | | Stadium: Stade Henri-Michel |

| 29 July 2023 Friendly | Hull City | 1–1 | Nantes | Kingston upon Hull, England |
| 15:00 BST (UTC+1) | Tufan 59' | Report | Banza 69' | Stadium: MKM Stadium; Attendance: 4,893 |

| 2 August 2023 Friendly | Lorient | 3–1 | Nantes | Vannes |
| 18:30 CEST (UTC+2) | Dieng 9'; Pagis 49'; Yongwa 52' | Report | Zézé 61' | Stadium: Stade de la Rabine |

| 5 August 2023 Friendly | 1. FC Köln | 2–0 | Nantes | Cologne, Germany |
| 18:30 CEST (UTC+2) | Waldschmidt 50'; Adamyan 64' | Report | | Stadium: RheinEnergieStadion; Attendance: 32,400 |

== Competitions ==
=== Overall record ===
| Competition | First match | Last match | Starting round | Final position | Record | | | | | | | |
| Competition | First match | Last match | Starting round | Final position | Pld | W | D | L | GF | GA | GD | Win % |
|---|---|---|---|---|---|---|---|---|---|---|---|---|
| Ligue 1 | 13 August 2023 | 19 May 2024 | Matchday 1 | 14th | 34 | 9 | 6 | 19 | 30 | 55 | −25 | 26.47 |
| Coupe de France | 5 January 2024 | 20 January 2024 | Round of 64 | Round of 32 | 2 | 1 | 0 | 1 | 4 | 2 | +2 | 50.00 |
| Total | | | | | 36 | 10 | 6 | 20 | 34 | 57 | −23 | 27.78 |

Source: Soccerway

=== Ligue 1 ===
==== League table ====
| Pos | Team | Pld | W | D | L | GF | GA | GD | Pts | Qualification or relegation |
|---|---|---|---|---|---|---|---|---|---|---|
| 12 | Montpellier (Note: Montpellier was deducted one point for uncontrolled crowd trouble that caused the abandonment of its match against Clermont.) | 34 | 10 | 12 | 12 | 43 | 48 | −5 | 41 | |
| 13 | Strasbourg | 34 | 10 | 9 | 15 | 38 | 50 | −12 | 39 | |
| 14 | Nantes | 34 | 9 | 6 | 19 | 30 | 55 | −25 | 33 | |
| 15 | Le Havre | 34 | 7 | 11 | 16 | 34 | 45 | −11 | 32 | |
| 16 | Metz (R) | 34 | 8 | 5 | 21 | 35 | 58 | −23 | 29 (Note: Metz finished ahead of Lorient on head-to-head away goals scored: Lorient 2–3 Metz, Metz 1–2 Lorient.) | Qualification for the Relegation play-offs |

Source: Ligue 1
Rules for classification: 1) Points; 2) Goal difference; 3) Head-to-head points; 4) Head-to-head goal difference; 5) Head-to-head goals scored; 6) Head-to-head away goals scored; 7) Goals scored; 8) Away goals scored; 9) Fair-play points (Note: Head-to-head record is used only after all the matches between the teams in question have been played).
(R) Relegated

==== Results summary ====
| Overall | | | | | | | | Home | | | | | | Away | | | | | |
| Pld | W | D | L | GF | GA | GD | Pts | W | D | L | GF | GA | GD | W | D | L | GF | GA | GD |
|---|---|---|---|---|---|---|---|---|---|---|---|---|---|---|---|---|---|---|---|
| 34 | 9 | 6 | 19 | 30 | 55 | −25 | 33 | 3 | 3 | 11 | 17 | 30 | −13 | 6 | 3 | 8 | 13 | 25 | −12 |

Source: Ligue 1

==== Results by round ====
| Round | 1 | 2 | 3 | 4 | 5 | 6 | 7 | 8 | 9 | 10 | 11 | 12 | 13 | 14 | 15 | 16 | 17 | 18 | 19 | 20 | 21 | 22 | 23 | 24 | 25 | 26 | 27 | 28 | 29 | 30 | 31 | 32 | 33 | 34 |
|---|---|---|---|---|---|---|---|---|---|---|---|---|---|---|---|---|---|---|---|---|---|---|---|---|---|---|---|---|---|---|---|---|---|---|
| Ground | H | A | H | H | A | H | A | A | H | A | H | A | H | H | A | H | A | H | A | H | A | H | A | H | A | H | A | H | A | H | A | A | H | A |
| Result | L | L | D | D | W | W | L | W | W | L | L | L | D | W | L | L | L | L | D | L | W | L | W | L | L | L | W | L | W | L | D | D | L | L |
| Position | 16 | 16 | 16 | 15 | 15 | 10 | 13 | 9 | 7 | 7 | 8 | 9 | 11 | 8 | 9 | 11 | 13 | 13 | 13 | 14 | 12 | 16 | 12 | 14 | 16 | 16 | 14 | 15 | 14 | 14 | 14 | 14 | 14 | 14 |

Source: Ligue 1
A = Away; H = Home; W = Win; D = Draw; L = Loss

==== Matches ====
The league fixtures were unveiled on 29 June 2023.

| 13 August 2023 1 | Nantes | 1–2 | Toulouse | Nantes |
| 15:00 CEST (UTC+2) | Coco (yellow card) 2'; Mohamed 13' (pen.); Pallois (yellow card) 18' | Report | Costa (yellow card) 53'; Aboukhlal 62'; Sierro (yellow card) 73'; Nicolaisen 90+1' | Stadium: Stade de la Beaujoire; Attendance: 30,578; Referee: Willy Delajod |

| 20 August 2023 2 | Lille | 2–0 | Nantes | Villeneuve-d'Ascq |
| 13:00 CEST (UTC+2) | David 66'; Alexsandro (red card) 78'; Ounas 90+4' | Report | Pallois (yellow card) 32'; Castelletto (yellow card) 47' | Stadium: Stade Pierre-Mauroy; Attendance: 34,536; Referee: Pierre Gaillouste |

| 25 August 2023 3 | Nantes | 3–3 | Monaco | Nantes |
| 21:00 CEST (UTC+2) | Mohamed 5' (pen.), 48'; Castelletto (yellow card) 7', (goal) 14'; Moutoussamy (yellow card) 64' | Report | Singo (yellow card) 9'; Minamino 27'; Golovin (yellow card) 54'; Ben Yedder 59'; Boadu 85' | Stadium: Stade de la Beaujoire; Attendance: 28,429; Referee: Jérémie Pignard |

| 1 September 2023 4 | Nantes | 1–1 | Marseille | Nantes |
| 21:00 CEST (UTC+2) | Meupiyou (red card) 9'; Mohamed 39' | Report | Sarr 4'; Aubameyang (yellow card) 26'; Rongier (yellow card) 70' | Stadium: Stade de la Beaujoire; Attendance: 34,600; Referee: Ruddy Buquet |

| 17 September 2023 5 | Clermont | 0–1 | Nantes | Clermont-Ferrand |
| 15:00 CEST (UTC+2) | Caufriez (yellow card) 82'; Keïta (yellow card) 88'; Cham (penalty missed) 90+6 | Report | Simon 48'; Mollet (yellow card) 74'; Douglas Augusto (yellow card) 79'; Cömert (yellow card) 90+4' | Stadium: Stade Gabriel Montpied; Attendance: 9,759; Referee: Thomas Léonard |

| 23 September 2023 6 | Nantes | 5–3 | Lorient | Nantes |
| 17:00 CEST (UTC+2) | Abline 42'; Cömert 46'; Mohamed 55'; Descamps (yellow card) 81'; Mollet 83'; Simon 90+9' (pen.) | Report | Kroupi 6'; Abergel (yellow card) 53'; Faivre 75', (yellow card) 90+1'; Aiyegun 85'; Igor Silva (yellow card) 90+7' | Stadium: Stade de la Beaujoire; Attendance: 30,704; Referee: Florent Batta |

| 1 October 2023 7 | Rennes | 3–1 | Nantes | Rennes |
| 20:45 CEST (UTC+2) | Bourigeaud 6' (pen.), (yellow card) 58'; Assignon (yellow card) 55'; Matić (yellow card) 63'; D. Doué 73'; Kalimuendo 90+5' (pen.) | Report | Mollet (yellow card) 37'; Chirivella 44', (yellow card) 62'; Moutoussamy (yellow card) 58'; Douglas Augusto (yellow card) 60'; Mohamed (yellow card) 77' (yellow-red card) 77'; Castelletto (yellow card) 87' | Stadium: Roazhon Park; Attendance: 27,316; Referee: Ruddy Buquet |

| 6 October 2023 8 | Strasbourg | 1–2 | Nantes | Strasbourg |
| 21:00 CEST (UTC+2) | Mwanga (yellow card) 25'; Guilbert (yellow card) 33'; Ângelo (yellow card) 45'; Perrin (yellow card) 81'; Sahi 90+2' | Report | Duverne (yellow card) 45+2'; Coco 50'; Moutoussamy 58' | Stadium: Stade de la Meinau; Attendance: 25,274; Referee: Stéphanie Frappart |

| 22 October 2023 9 | Nantes | 2–0 | Montpellier | Nantes |
| 15:00 CEST (UTC+2) | Mollet 44', (yellow card) 64'; Bamba 74', (yellow card) 75' | Report | Kouyaté (yellow card) 90+2' | Stadium: Stade de la Beaujoire; Attendance: 26,864; Referee: Marc Bollengier |

| 28 October 2023 10 | Lens | 4–0 | Nantes | Lens |
| 21:00 CEST (UTC+2) | Sotoca 27' (pen.), 72' (pen.); Medina 58'; Wahi (yellow card) 68'; El Aynaoui 89' | Report | Cömert (yellow card) 68'; Duverne (yellow card) 83' | Stadium: Stade Bollaert-Delelis; Attendance: 38,223; Referee: Pierre Gaillouste |

| 5 November 2023 11 | Nantes | 0–1 | Reims | Nantes |
| 15:00 CET (UTC+1) | Pierre-Gabriel (yellow card) 90+6' | Report | Foket (yellow card) 53'; Busi (yellow card) 71'; Itō 75' | Stadium: Stade de la Beaujoire; Attendance: 33,621; Referee: Gaël Angoula |

| 12 November 2023 12 | Metz | 3–1 | Nantes | Metz |
| 15:00 CET (UTC+1) | Van Den Kerkhof 3'; Elisor 28'; Asoro 85' | Report | Simon 12' | Stadium: Stade Saint-Symphorien; Attendance: 21,674; Referee: Florent Batta |

| 26 November 2023 13 | Nantes | 0–0 | Le Havre | Nantes |
| 15:00 CET (UTC+1) | Pierre-Gabriel (yellow card) 45' | Report | Ayew (red card) 67'; Ndiaye (yellow card) 85'; Sangante (yellow card) 90+6' | Stadium: Stade de la Beaujoire; Attendance: 29,346; Referee: Miguel Nogueira |

| 2 December 2023 14 | Nantes | 1–0 | Nice | Nantes |
| 21:00 CET (UTC+1) | Castelletto (yellow card) 18'; Mollet 25'; Duverne (yellow card) 61'; Chirivella (yellow card) 89' | Report | | Stadium: Stade de la Beaujoire; Attendance: 26,560; Referee: Ruddy Buquet |

| 9 December 2023 15 | Paris Saint-Germain | 2–1 | Nantes | Paris |
| 21:00 CET (UTC+1) | Barcola 41'; Kolo Muani 83'; Hernandez (yellow card) 90+2' | Report | Douglas Augusto (yellow card) 29'; Mohamed 55'; Duverne (yellow card) 82'; Pierre-Gabriel (yellow card) 90+2' | Stadium: Parc des Princes; Attendance: 47,926; Referee: Jérôme Brisard |

| 17 December 2023 16 | Nantes | 0–2 | Brest | Nantes |
| 13:00 CET (UTC+1) | Lafont (yellow card) 78' | Report | Camara (yellow card) 45'; Magnetti 50'; Mounié 57'; Le Douaron (yellow card) 86'; Satriano (yellow card) 90' | Stadium: Stade de la Beaujoire; Attendance: 30,075; Referee: Benoît Millot |

| 20 December 2023 17 | Lyon | 1–0 | Nantes | Décines-Charpieu |
| 21:00 CET (UTC+1) | Lacazette 49'; Lovren (red card) 84'; Tagliafico (yellow card) 90+5' | Report | Centonze (yellow card) 8'; Duverne (yellow card) 31' | Stadium: Parc Olympique Lyonnais; Attendance: 20,028; Referee: Benoît Bastien |

| 14 January 2024 18 | Nantes | 1–2 | Clermont | Nantes |
| 15:00 CET (UTC+1) | Mollet (yellow card) 38', (goal) 47'; Traoré (red card) 73' | Report | Nicholson 29'; Gastien (yellow card) 54'; Allevinah 89' | Stadium: Stade de la Beaujoire; Attendance: 20,866; Referee: Romain Lissorgue |

| 28 January 2024 19 | Reims | 0–0 | Nantes | Reims |
| 15:00 CET (UTC+1) | Foket (yellow card) 58'; Koudou (yellow card) 72'; Munetsi (yellow card) 81' | Report | Kadewere (penalty missed) 73'; Douglas Augusto (yellow card) 87'; Sissoko (yellow card) 90' | Stadium: Stade Auguste-Delaune; Attendance: 14,388; Referee: Jérémie Pignard |

| 3 February 2024 20 | Nantes | 0–1 | Lens | Nantes |
| 21:00 CET (UTC+1) | Kadewere (yellow card) 27'; Douglas Augusto (yellow card) 61' | Report | Costa 48'; Aguilar (yellow card) 82'; Danso (yellow card) 82' | Stadium: Stade de la Beaujoire; Attendance: 34,167; Referee: Florent Batta |

| 11 February 2024 21 | Toulouse | 1–2 | Nantes | Toulouse |
| 15:00 CET (UTC+1) | Sierro (yellow card) 19'; Gboho (yellow card) 41'; Dallinga 90+6' | Report | Mohamed 2'; Sissoko (yellow card) 45+1'; Kadewere 51' | Stadium: Stadium de Toulouse; Attendance: 28,933; Referee: Gaël Angoula |

| 17 February 2024 22 | Nantes | 0–2 | Paris Saint-Germain | Nantes |
| 21:00 CET (UTC+1) | Sissoko (yellow card) 77' | Report | Hernandez 60'; Mbappé 78' (pen.) | Stadium: Stade de la Beaujoire; Attendance: 34,038; Referee: Jérôme Brisard |

| 24 February 2024 23 | Lorient | 0–1 | Nantes | Lorient |
| 17:00 CET (UTC+1) | | Report | Castelletto 49'; Douglas Augusto (yellow card) 67'; Pallois (yellow card) 69' | Stadium: Stade du Moustoir; Attendance: 16,783; Referee: Willy Delajod |

| 3 March 2024 24 | Nantes | 0–2 | Metz | Nantes |
| 15:00 CET (UTC+1) | Douglas Augusto (yellow card) 61'; Castelletto (yellow card) 64'; Cozza (yellow card) 68' | Report | Candé (yellow card) 3'; Colin (yellow card) 28'; Mikautadze 58' (pen.); Udol 60' | Stadium: Stade de la Beaujoire; Attendance: 27,132; Referee: Eric Wattellier |

| 10 March 2024 25 | Marseille | 2–0 | Nantes | Marseille |
| 20:45 CET (UTC+1) | Aubameyang 17', 79', (yellow card) 74'; Mbemba (yellow card) 90+2' | Report | Douglas Augusto (yellow card) 27'; Amian (yellow card) 45+2'; Sissoko (yellow card) 90+6' | Stadium: Stade Vélodrome; Attendance: 56,958; Referee: François Letexier |

| 16 March 2024 26 | Nantes | 1–3 | Strasbourg | Nantes |
| 17:00 CET (UTC+1) | Zézé (yellow card) 33'; Cömert 36', (yellow card) 90+2' | Report | Gameiro 3'; Senaya (yellow card) 18'; Sow (yellow card) 35'; Emegha 62', 78'; Bakwa (yellow card) 83' | Stadium: Stade de la Beaujoire; Attendance: 29,487; Referee: Jérémie Pignard |

| 31 March 2024 27 | Nice | 1–2 | Nantes | Nice |
| 15:00 CEST (UTC+2) | Lotomba (yellow card) 59'; Moffi 72' (pen.); Laborde (yellow card) 90+8' | Report | Abline 19', (yellow card) 78'; Cozza (yellow card) 51'; Cömert (yellow card) 52'; Chirivella (yellow card) 59'; Mohamed 77' (pen.); Coco (yellow card) 90+1' | Stadium: Allianz Riviera; Attendance: 21,142; Referee: Bastien Dechepy |

| 7 April 2024 28 | Nantes | 1–3 | Lyon | Nantes |
| 20:45 CEST (UTC+2) | Abline 16'; Cömert (yellow card) 18'; Mohamed (yellow card) 74' | Report | Lacazette (yellow card) 53', (goal) 75'; Nuamah (yellow card) 71'; Fofana 77'; Orban 90+7' | Stadium: Stade de la Beaujoire; Attendance: 0 Referee: Jérôme Brisard |

| 14 April 2024 29 | Le Havre | 0–1 | Nantes | Le Havre |
| 13:00 CEST (UTC+2) | Sabbi (yellow card) 16'; Kuzyayev (yellow card) 83'; Grandsir (yellow card) 90+1' | Report | Pallois (yellow card) 66'; Bamba 90+3', (yellow card) 90+4' | Stadium: Stade Océane; Attendance: 23,021; Referee: Hakim Ben El Hadj |

| 20 April 2024 30 | Nantes | 0–3 | Rennes | Nantes |
| 17:00 CEST (UTC+2) | Chirivella (yellow card) 84' | Report | Wooh (yellow card) 39'; D. Doué (yellow card) 45'; Santamaria (yellow card) 52'; G. Doué (yellow card) 63'; Kalimuendo 67'; Bourigeaud 76' (pen.); Gouiri 90+1' | Stadium: Stade de la Beaujoire; Attendance: 25,433; Referee: Willy Delajod |

| 26 April 2024 31 | Montpellier | 1–1 | Nantes | Montpellier |
| 21:00 CEST (UTC+2) | Adams 2'; Savanier (yellow card) 24'; Tchato (yellow card) 45'; Mincarelli (red card) 90+1'; Nordin (red card) 90+5' | Report | Abline 7'; Sissoko (yellow card) 45+4' | Stadium: Stade de la Mosson; Attendance: 17,331; Referee: Jérémy Stinat |

| 4 May 2024 32 | Brest | 0–0 | Nantes | Brest |
| 21:00 CEST (UTC+2) | Locko (yellow card) 22'; Lala (yellow card) 59'; Doumbia (yellow card) 87' | Report | Traoré (yellow card) 54'; Chirivella (yellow card) 89' | Stadium: Stade Francis-Le Blé; Attendance: 15,159; Referee: Clément Turpin |

| 12 May 2024 33 | Nantes | 1–2 | Lille | Nantes |
| 21:00 CEST (UTC+2) | Mohamed (yellow card) 33'; Lafont (yellow card) 44'; Abline 54'; Pallois (yellow card) 60'; Sissoko (yellow card) 74' | Report | David 8', 11'; Zhegrova (yellow card) 44'; Bentaleb (yellow card) 81' | Stadium: Stade de la Beaujoire; Attendance: 26,529; Referee: Eric Wattellier |

| 19 May 2024 34 | Monaco | 4–0 | Nantes | Monaco |
| 21:00 CEST (UTC+2) | Ben Yedder 6'; Kehrer 10'; Magassa (yellow card) 21'; Camara 24' (pen.); Ben Seghir 61' | Report | Amian (yellow card) 36'; Sissoko (yellow card) 41' | Stadium: Stade Louis II; Attendance: 7,343; Referee: Romain Lissorgue |

=== Coupe de France ===
| 5 January 2024 Round of 64 | Pau | 1–4 | Nantes | Pau |
| 18:00 CET (UTC+1) | Sylla 15' | Report | Mollet 49'; Centonze (yellow card) 77'; Kadewere 80', 83'; Bamba 88'; Douglas Augusto (yellow card) 90+5' | Stadium: Stade du Hameau; Attendance: 3,353; Referee: Pierre Gaillouste |

| 20 January 2024 Round of 32 | Nantes | 0–1 | Laval | Nantes |
| 17:30 CET (UTC+1) | Cömert (yellow card) 90+5' | Report | Cherni (yellow card) 53'; Tchokounté 60' | Stadium: Stade de la Beaujoire; Attendance: 31,962; Referee: Ruddy Buquet |
