= Nicolas Pallois =

French professional footballer (born 1987)

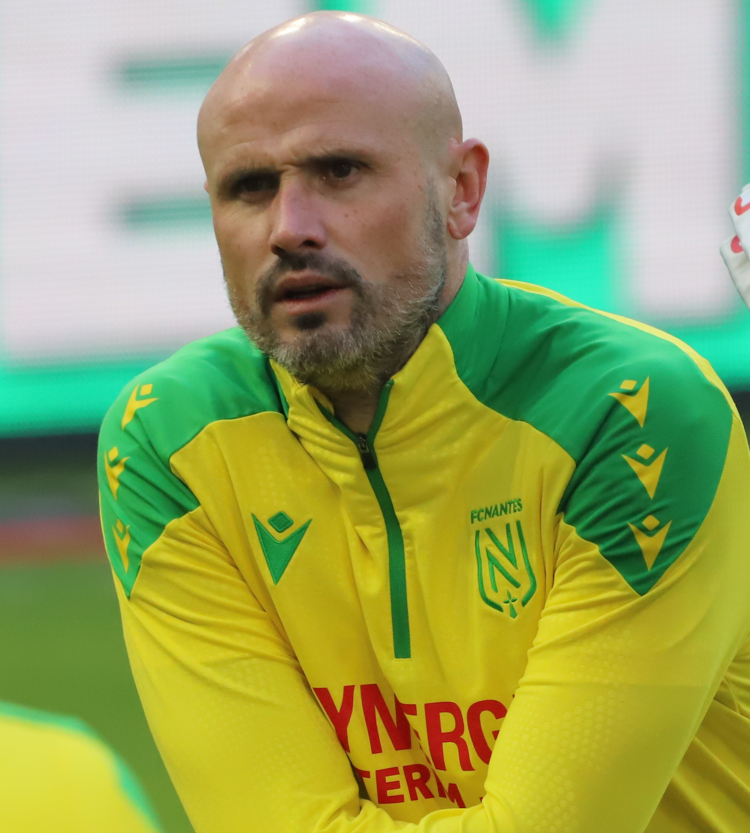
- Pallois playing for Nantes in 2025

Personal information
- Date of birth: 19 September 1987 (age 39)
- Place of birth: Elbeuf, France
- Height: 1.89 m (6 ft 2 in)
- Position: Centre-back

Senior career*
Years	Team	Apps	(Gls)
2007–2008	Caen	0	(0)
2008–2010	Quevilly	53	(3)
2010–2012	Valenciennes	11	(0)
2011–2012	→ Laval (loan)	21	(3)
2012–2014	Niort	71	(4)
2014–2017	Bordeaux	82	(3)
2016	Bordeaux B	2	(0)
2017–2025	Nantes	210	(6)
2018	Nantes B	1	(0)
2025–2026	Reims	15	(1)
- * Club domestic league appearances and goals as of 11 May 2026

Nicolas Pallois (born 19 September 1987) is a French professional footballer who plays as a centre-back. He has previously played for Caen, Quevilly, Valenciennes, Laval, Chamois Niortais, Bordeaux, Nantes and Reims.

== Career ==
Pallois started his career with Caen but failed to make an appearance for the club before moving to Championnat de France amateur side Quevilly in 2008. During his two years with Quevilly, he played 53 league matches scoring three goals. In May 2010, Pallois joined Ligue 1 club Valenciennes on a three-year contract. He made his professional debut during the 2010–11 season with Valenciennes and went on to play 11 times for the club, before moving on loan to Laval for the 2011–12 season.

On 28 June 2012, Pallois signed a two-year deal with newly promoted Ligue 2 side Chamois Niortais. He went on to make 71 league appearances for Niort over the following two seasons, scoring four goals.

On 17 June 2014, he signed a four-year contract with Bordeaux.

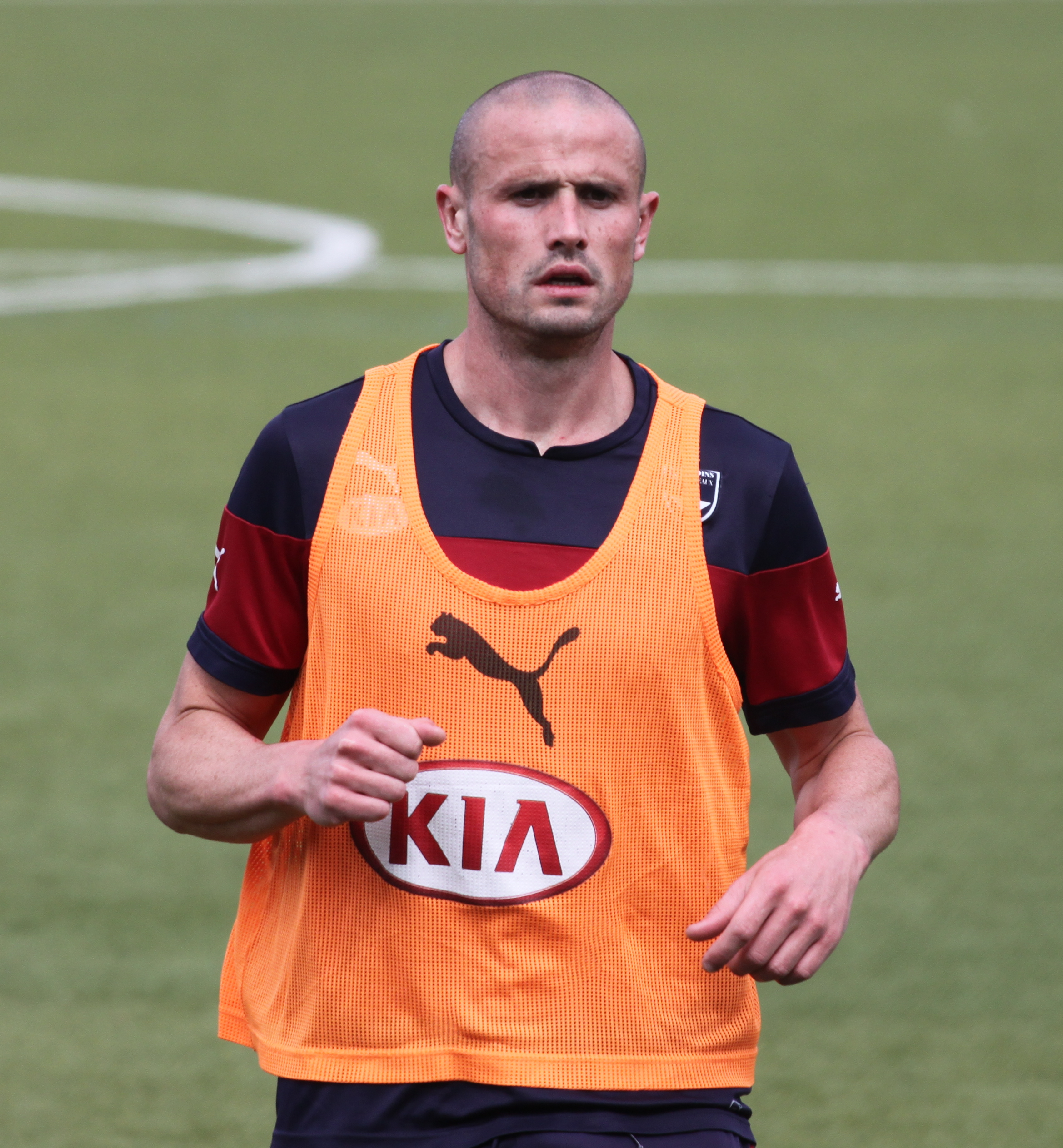
Pallois training with Bordeaux in 2015.

In late July 2017, Pallois moved Ligue 1 rivals Nantes, agreeing to a three-year deal with the option of a fourth year. The transfer fee paid to Bordeaux was reported as close to €2 million.

On 28 June 2025, Pallois signed with Ligue 2 club Reims. He left at the end of the season.

== Honours ==
Nantes

- Coupe de France: 2021–22
