= 2021–22 Chamois Niortais F.C. season =

Chamois Niortais F.C.
2021–22 season
- Chairman: Karim Fradin
- Manager: Sébastien Desabre
- Stadium: Stade René Gaillard
- Ligue 2: 13th
- Top goalscorer: League: Ibrahim Sissoko (10); All: Ibrahim Sissoko (10)
Home colours	Away colours

The 2021–22 season was the 97th season in the existence of Chamois Niortais F.C. and the club's eighth consecutive season in the second division of French football. The team was excluded from Coupe de France this season.

== Players ==
=== First-team squad ===
As of 2 February 2022

Note: Flags indicate national team as defined under FIFA eligibility rules; some limited exceptions apply. Players may hold more than one non-FIFA nationality.

No.	Pos.	Nation	Player
1	GK	FRA	Mathieu Michel
3	DF	CMR	Darlin Yongwa
4	DF	GUI	Ibrahima Conté
5	DF	CMR	Guy Kilama
6	MF	FRA	Dylan Louiserre (captain)
7	MF	TUN	Moataz Zemzemi
8	MF	GHA	Godwin Bentil
9	FW	FRA	Ibrahim Sissoko
10	MF	FRA	Bilal Boutobba
11	FW	FRA	Yanis Merdji
12	FW	GBS	Joseph Mendes
15	MF	BEN	Junior Olaitan
16	GK	FRA	Yanis Maronne
17	MF	MTQ	Samuel Renel
18	DF	FRA	Bradley M'bondo
19	DF	FRA	Brahima Doukansy

No.	Pos.	Nation	Player
21	DF	FRA	Lenny Vallier
22	MF	FRA	Quentin Bena
23	MF	FRA	Tom Lebeau
24	MF	FRA	Tyrone Tormin
26	MF	FRA	Samy Benchamma
27	DF	FRA	Bryan Passi
28	DF	BFA	Issouf Paro
29	DF	FRA	Joris Moutachy
30	GK	FRA	Quentin Braat
33	MF	FRA	Yohan Cassubie
34	DF	FRA	Tao Sako
35	FW	FRA	Sidi Cissé
36	MF	FRA	Mathis Ansar
37	MF	FRA	Yassine Benhattab
40	GK	FRA	Jean Louchet

== Pre-season and friendlies ==
Win Draw Loss

11 July 2021 Friendly	Angers (France)	2–2	(France) Niort	Saint-Martin-de-Ré, France
18:00 CEST (UTC+2)				Stadium: Complexe Sportif Marcel Gaillard

16 July 2021 Challenge Emiliano Sala	Bordeaux (France)	1–1 (5–3 p)	(France) Niort	Orléans, France
19:00 CEST (UTC+2)	Briand 24'	Report	Kilama 64'	Stadium: Stade de la Source
	Penalties
	Maja (penalty scored); Mara (penalty scored); Bakwa (penalty scored); Traoré (penalty scored); Lauray (penalty scored)		(penalty scored) Vallier; (penalty missed) Renel; (penalty scored) Conté; (penalty scored) Braat

18 July 2021 Challenge Emiliano Sala	Nantes (France)	0–1	(France) Niort	Orléans, France
14:00 CEST (UTC+2)			Ansart 80'	Stadium: Stade de la Source; Attendance: 400

== Competitions ==
=== Overall record ===
Competition	First match	Last match	Starting round	Final position	Record							
Competition	First match	Last match	Starting round	Final position	Pld	W	D	L	GF	GA	GD	Win %
Ligue 2	24 July 2021	14 May 2022	Matchday 1	13th	38	12	10	16	39	42	−3	31.58
Total					38	12	10	16	39	42	−3	31.58

Source: Soccerway

=== Ligue 2 ===
==== League table ====
Pos	Team	Pld	W	D	L	GF	GA	GD	Pts
11	Dijon	38	13	8	17	48	53	−5	47
12	Bastia	38	10	16	12	38	36	+2	46
13	Niort	38	12	10	16	39	42	−3	46
14	Amiens	38	9	17	12	43	41	+2	44
15	Grenoble	38	12	8	18	32	44	−12	44

Source: Ligue 2
Rules for classification: 1) Points; 2) Goal difference; 3) Number of goals scored; 4) Head-to-head goal difference; 5) Fair play points

==== Results summary ====
Overall								Home						Away					
Pld	W	D	L	GF	GA	GD	Pts	W	D	L	GF	GA	GD	W	D	L	GF	GA	GD
38	12	10	16	39	42	−3	46	7	5	7	21	17	+4	5	5	9	18	25	−7

Source: Ligue 2

==== Results by round ====
Round	1	2	3	4	5	6	7	8	9	10	11	12	13	14	15	16	17	18	19	20	21	22	23	24	25	26	27	28	29	30	31	32	33	34	35	36	37	38
Ground	A	H	A	H	A	H	A	H	A	H	A	A	H	A	H	A	H	A	H	A	H	A	H	A	H	A	H	A	H	H	A	H	A	H	A	H	A	H
Result	D	L	W	W	L	D	L	W	D	W	L	W	L	W	L	L	W	D	W	W	W	L	D	L	L	L	L	L	D	W	D	D	W	D	L	L	D	L
Position	15	16	10	7	12	11	13	12	10	8	9	6	7	7	7	9	9	8	7	7	7	6	6	7	6	7	9	11	13	8	12	12	9	9	10	11	10	13

Source: Ligue 2
A = Away; H = Home; W = Win; D = Draw; L = Loss

==== Matches ====
The league fixtures were announced on 25 June 2021.

24 July 2021 1	Valenciennes	0–0	Niort	Valenciennes
20:00 CEST (UTC+2)	Kaba (yellow card) 58'; D'Almeida (yellow card) 75'	Report	Vallier (yellow card) 41'; Boutobba (yellow card) 65'; Louiserre (yellow card) 73'	Stadium: Stade du Hainaut; Referee: Arnaud Baert

31 July 2021 2	Niort	0–1	Caen	Niort
19:00 CEST (UTC+2)	Yongwa (yellow card) 33' (yellow-red card) 64'	Report	Wadja (yellow card) 25'; Deminguet (yellow card) 46'; Mendy 48'	Stadium: Stade René Gaillard; Attendance: 1,523; Referee: Abdelatif Kherradji

7 August 2021 3	Dunkerque	1–2	Niort	Dunkerque
19:00 CEST (UTC+2)	Pierre 16'; Dudouit (yellow card) 37'	Report	Cassubie 19'; Mendes 90+4'	Stadium: Stade Marcel-Tribut; Referee: Benjamin Lepaysant

14 August 2021 4	Niort	1–0	Grenoble	Niort
19:00 CEST (UTC+2)	Boutobba 45+2'; Cassubie (yellow card) 48'; Bâ (yellow card) 51'; Braat (yellow card) 78'	Report	Monfray (yellow card) 33'; Belmonte (yellow card) 48' de Iriondo (red card) 54'; Pickel (yellow card) 54'; Ravet (penalty missed) 80'	Stadium: Stade René Gaillard; Referee: Guillaume Paradis

21 August 2021 5	Le Havre	2–1	Niort	Le Havre
19:00 CEST (UTC+2)	Thiaré 37', 56'; Sangante (yellow card) 71'; Bonnet (yellow card) 73'; Lekhal (yellow card) 85'	Report	Passi (yellow card) 25'; Vallier (yellow card) 33'; Renel 62'; Yongwa (yellow card) 81'	Stadium: Stade Océane; Referee: Marc Bollengier

28 August 2021 6	Niort	0–0	Amiens	Niort
19:00 CEST (UTC+2)	Cassubie (yellow card) 54'; Yongwa (yellow card) 90+2'	Report	Alphonse (yellow card) 55'	Stadium: Stade René Gaillard; Referee: Bartolomeu Varela

11 September 2021 7	Auxerre	4–0	Niort	Auxerre
19:00 CEST (UTC+2)	Charbonnier 16', 70', 87'; Conté 90+1' (o.g.)	Report		Stadium: Stade de l'Abbé-Deschamps; Referee: Abdelatif Kherradji

18 September 2021 8	Niort	2–0	Guingamp	Niort
19:00 CEST (UTC+2)	Boutobba 15', 64'; Zemzemi (yellow card) 55'; Louiserre (yellow card) 73'	Report	Gomis (yellow card) 9'; Muyumba (yellow card) 67'; Merghem (yellow card) 85'	Stadium: Stade René Gaillard; Referee: Mathieu Vernice

21 September 2021 9	Ajaccio	0–0	Niort	Ajaccio
19:00 CEST (UTC+2)	Diallo (yellow card) 24'; Vidal (yellow card) 45'; Laçi (yellow card) 68'	Report	Conté (yellow card) 19'; Sissoko (yellow card) 24'; Passi (yellow card) 86'	Stadium: Stade François Coty; Referee: Benjamin Lepaysant

24 September 2021 10	Niort	4–1	Paris FC	Niort
21:00 CEST (UTC+2)	Passi 4'; Louiserre 17'; Mendes (yellow card) 59'; Sissoko 72'; Vallier 76'	Report	Kanté (yellow card) 31'; Laura (yellow card) 45'; Tattevin 86'	Stadium: Stade René Gaillard; Referee: Nicolas Rainville

2 October 2021 11	Sochaux	1–0	Niort	Montbéliard
21:00 CEST (UTC+2)	Ndiaye (yellow card) 52'; Senaya (yellow card) 69'; Weissbeck (yellow card) 75'; Kalulu 83'	Report	Louiserre (yellow card) 90+1'	Stadium: Stade Auguste Bonal; Referee: Aurelien Petit

16 October 2021 12	Quevilly-Rouen	0–3	Niort	Rouen
19:00 CEST (UTC+2)	Bansais (yellow card) 39'	Report	Vallier (yellow card) 7', (goal) 13'; Mendes 23' (pen.); Zemzemi (yellow card) 51'; Kilama (yellow card) 59'; Renel 82'	Stadium: Stade Robert Diochon; Referee: Bartolomeu Varela

23 October 2021 13	Niort	0–2	Rodez	Niort
21:00 CEST (UTC+2)		Report	Chougrani (yellow card) 40'; Dembélé 45'; M'Pasi (yellow card) 89'; Bonnet 90'	Stadium: Stade René Gaillard; Referee: Alexandre Perreau Niel

30 October 2021 14	Nîmes	1–2	Niort	Nîmes
19:00 CEST (UTC+2)	Eliasson 53'; Guessoum (yellow card) 66'; Paquiez (yellow card) 85'	Report	Mendes (yellow card) 13', (goal) 51'; Zemzemi 25'	Stadium: Stade des Costières; Referee: Olivier Thual

6 November 2021 15	Niort	1–3	Nancy	Niort
21:00 CEST (UTC+2)	Thiam 56' (o.g.); M'bondo (yellow card) 83'	Report	Biron 11', 48', 70' (pen.), (yellow card) 70'; Basila (yellow card) 39'	Stadium: Stade René Gaillard; Referee: Jérôme Miguelgorry

20 November 2021 16	Bastia	2–0	Niort	Furiani
19:00 CET (UTC+1)	Santelli 14', (yellow card) 34'; Salles-Lamonge 43'; Le Cardinal (yellow card) 57'; Ducrocq (yellow card) 90+3'	Report	Mendes (yellow card) 34', (penalty missed) 72'; Merdji (yellow card) 75'; Lebeau (yellow card) 90+3'	Stadium: Stade Armand Cesari; Referee: Johann Hamel

6 December 2021 17	Niort	2–1	Toulouse	Niort
20:45 CET (UTC+1)	Sissoko 50'; Zemzemi 62'; Conté (yellow card) 81'	Report	Ratão 76'; Genreau (yellow card) 90'	Stadium: Stade René Gaillard; Referee: Eric Wattellier

11 December 2021 18	Dijon	2–2	Niort	Dijon
19:00 CET (UTC+1)	Coulibaly (yellow card) 33'; Scheidler (yellow card) 49'; Rocchia (yellow card) 58'; Congré 69'; Le Bihan 84'; Deaux (yellow card) 86'	Report	Reynet 23' (o.g.); Merdji 28'; Yongwa (yellow card) 67'; Louiserre (yellow card) 80'; Benchamma (yellow card) 83'	Stadium: Stade Gaston Gérard; Referee: Abdelatif Kherradji

21 December 2021 19	Niort	3–0	Pau	Niort
20:45 CET (UTC+1)	Sissoko 48' (pen.); Merdji 73'; Boutobba 81'	Report	Lobry (yellow card) 17'; Koffi (yellow card) 60'; Batisse (yellow card) 62'	Stadium: Stade René Gaillard; Referee: Aurelian Petit

28 January 2022 20	Caen	0–2	Niort	Caen
19:00 CET (UTC+1)	Gonçalves (yellow card) 52' da Costa (yellow card) 66'; Shamal (yellow card) 85'; Court (red card) 90+5'	Report	Sissoko 4', 48'; Moutachy (yellow card) 7'; Cassubie (yellow card) 45+'	Stadium: Stade Michel d'Ornano; Referee: Arnaud Baert

1 February 2022 21	Niort	2–0	Dunkerque	Niort
20:45 CET (UTC+1)	Boutobba 56'; Merdji 71'	Report	A. Gomis (yellow card) 35'	Stadium: Stade René Gaillard; Referee: Jérôme Miguelgorry

15 February 2022 22	Grenoble	1–0	Niort	Grenoble
19:00 CET (UTC+1)	Jeno (yellow card) 39'; Nestor 47'; Néry (yellow card) 66'; Bambock (yellow card) 83'	Report	Passi (yellow card) 72'	Stadium: Stade des Alpes; Referee: Mikael Lesage

5 February 2022 23	Niort	0–0	Le Havre	Niort
20:45 CET (UTC+1)		Report	Richardson (yellow card) 74'	Stadium: Stade René Gaillard; Referee: Arnaud Petit

12 February 2022 24	Amiens	3–1	Niort	Amiens
19:00 CET (UTC+1)	Badji 13', 36'; Gene (yellow card) 19'; Pavlović (yellow card) 61'; Gnahoré 77'	Report	Sissoko 76'	Stadium: Stade de la Licorne; Referee: Alexandre Perreau Niel

19 February 2022 25	Niort	0–1	Auxerre	Niort
19:00 CET (UTC+1)	Merdji (yellow card) 61'	Report	Hein 33'; Bernard (yellow card) 53'; Charbonnier (yellow card) 84'	Stadium: Stade René Gaillard; Referee: Frank Schneider

26 February 2022 26	Guingamp	1–0	Niort	Guingamp
19:00 CET (UTC+1)	Merghem (yellow card) 72'; Pierrot 78'	Report	Doukansy (yellow card) 40'	Stadium: Stade de Roudourou; Referee: Gaël Angoula

5 March 2022 27	Niort	0–1	Ajaccio	Niort
19:00 CET (UTC+1)		Report	Cimignani (yellow card) 19'; Krasso 86'	Stadium: Stade René Gaillard; Referee: Aurélien Petit

12 March 2022 28	Paris FC	2–0	Niort	Paris
15:00 CET (UTC+1)	Name (penalty missed) 45+3', 45+3'; Kanté 66'	Report	Sissoko (yellow card) 9'	Stadium: Stade Sébastien Charléty; Referee: Olivier Thual

15 March 2022 29	Niort	1–1	Sochaux	Niort
20:00 CET (UTC+1)	Moutachy (yellow card) 36'; Sissoko 48' (pen.); Merdji (yellow card) 58'	Report	Kalulu 8', (yellow card) 80'; Thioune (yellow card) 38'; Do Couto (yellow card) 43'; Weissbeck (yellow card) 62'	Stadium: Stade René Gaillard; Referee: Nicolas Rainville

19 March 2022 30	Niort	2–0	Quevilly-Rouen	Niort
20:00 CET (UTC+1)	Sissoko 33', 68'	Report	Bansais (yellow card) 6'; Boé-Kane (yellow card) 22'; Sangaré (red card) 88'	Stadium: Stade René Gaillard; Referee: Benjamin Lepaysant

2 April 2022 31	Rodez	1–1	Niort	Rodez
19:00 CEST (UTC+2)	Chougrani 30'; Raux-Yao (yellow card) 41'	Report	M'Pasi 33' (o.g.); Kilama (yellow card) 49'	Stadium: Stade Paul-Lignon; Referee: Abdelatifa Kherradji

9 April 2022 32	Niort	0–0	Nîmes	Niort
20:00 CEST (UTC+2)	Mendes (yellow card) 90+1'	Report	Cubas (yellow card) 45'; Fomba (yellow card) 50'	Stadium: Stade René Gaillard; Referee: Marc Bollengier

16 April 2022 33	Nancy	0–2	Niort	Tomblaine
19:00 CEST (UTC+2)		Report	Vallier (yellow card) 15'; Boutobba 48'; Mendes 83'	Stadium: Stade Marcel Picot; Referee: Arnaud Baert

19 April 2022 34	Niort	1–1	Bastia	Niort
20:00 CEST (UTC+2)	Conté (yellow card) 36'; Sissoko (yellow card) 45', (goal) 67'	Report	Schur (yellow card) 3'; Boyer (yellow card) 35'; Santelli 38' (pen.); Guidi (yellow card) 45'; Magri (yellow card) 45'	Stadium: Stade René Gaillard; Referee: Thomas Léonard

25 April 2022 35	Toulouse	2–0	Niort	Toulouse
15:00 CEST (UTC+2)	Dejaegere 21'; Onaiwu 78'	Report	Kilama (yellow card) 41'; Cassubie (yellow card) 52'	Stadium: Stadium de Toulouse; Referee: Alexandre Perreau Niel

30 April 2022 36	Niort	1–3	Dijon	Niort
20:00 CEST (UTC+2)	Mendes 45+2' (pen.)	Report	Dobre 44', 50'; Le Bihan 77'; Jacob (yellow card) 83'	Stadium: Stade René Gaillard; Referee: Pierre Legat

7 May 2022 37	Pau	2–2	Niort	Pau
19:00 CEST (UTC+2)	Essende 16', 56'	Report	Zemzemi 8'; Boutobba 31'	Stadium: Nouste Camp; Referee: Remi Landry

14 May 2022 38	Niort	1–2	Valenciennes	Niort
19:00 CEST (UTC+2)	Bentil 28'	Report	Bonnet 37'; Kalai 74'	Stadium: Stade René Gaillard; Referee: Abdelatifa Kherradji
