= 2022 Coupe de France final =

Football match between Nice and Nantes

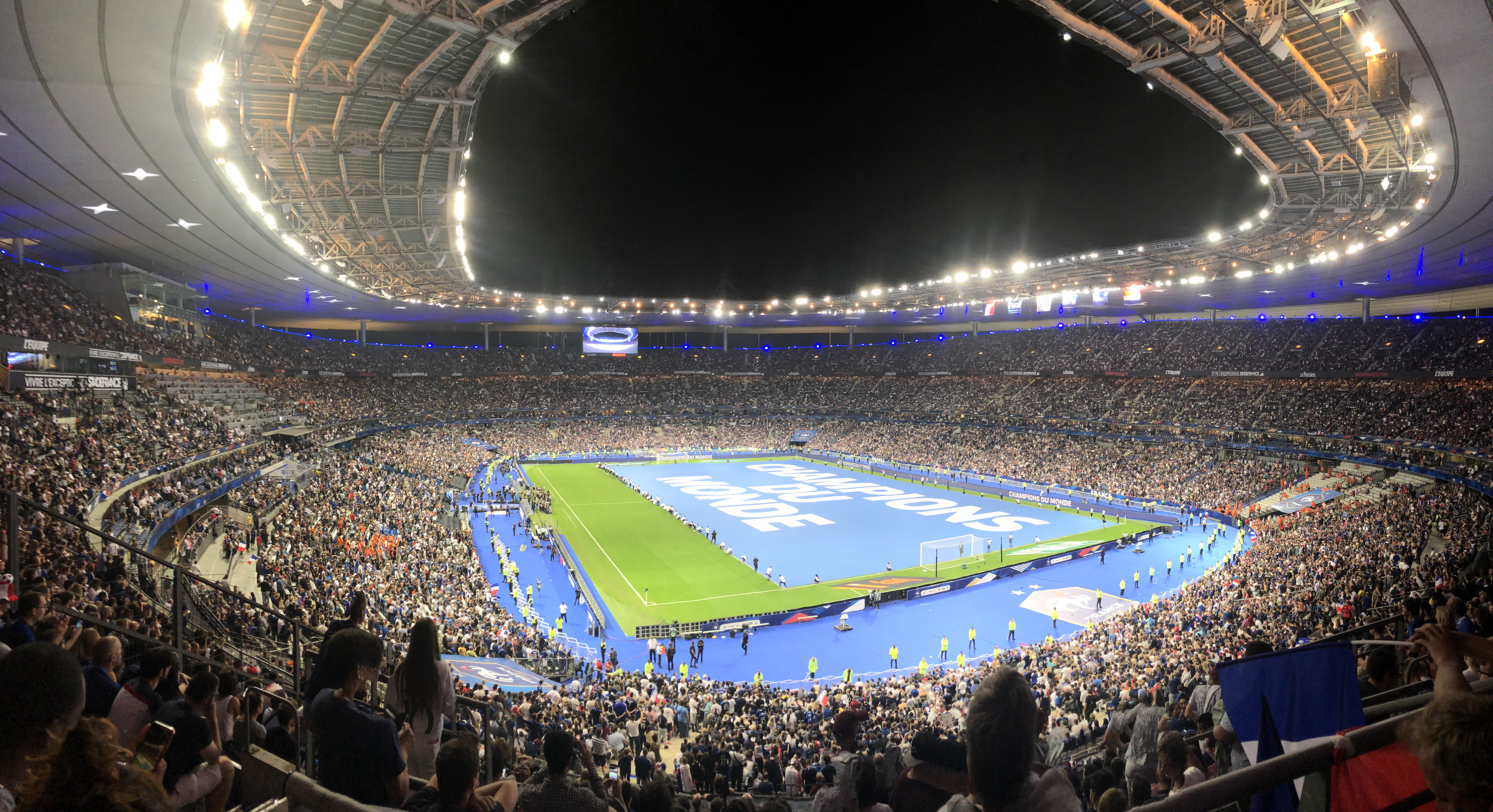
- The Stade de France hosted the final.
- Event: 2021–22 Coupe de France
Nice	Nantes
Ligue 1	Ligue 1
0	1
- Date: 7 May 2022
- Venue: Stade de France, Saint-Denis
- Referee: Stéphanie Frappart
- Attendance: 78,961

The 2022 Coupe de France final was a football match between Nice and Nantes to decide the winner of the 2021–22 Coupe de France, the 105th season of the Coupe de France. Originally scheduled to take place on 8 May at the Stade de France in Saint-Denis, Paris, the final was moved to 7 May in consultation with competing clubs and the broadcasters.

Nantes won the match 1–0 for their fourth Coupe de France title.

== Background ==
Nice reached the final this year for the fifth time in its history, and the first since 1997, a game they won over Guingamp after a penalty shoot-out following a 1–1 draw in extra time.

Nantes reached the final this year for the fourth time in its history, having lost at the round of 64 of last year's edition to Lens. This was the first time they reached the final since 2000, a game they won over Calais.

== Route to the final ==
Nice		Round	Nantes
Opponent	Result	2021–22 Coupe de France	Opponent	Result
SO Cholet	1–0 (A)	Round of 64	Sochaux	0–0 (5–4 pen.) (A)
Paris FC/Lyon (Note: Nice were due to meet either Paris FC or Lyon in the round of 32, but their round of 64 match was abandoned after half time due to crowd trouble; as a result of the disqualification of both teams, Nice were awarded a bye to the round of 16.)	Bye (H)	Round of 32	AS Vitré	2–0 (H)
Paris Saint-Germain	0–0 (6–5 pen.) (A)	Round of 16	Brest	2–0 (H)
Marseille	4–1 (H)	Quarter-finals	Bastia	2–0 (H)
FC Versailles 78	2–0 (H)	Semi-finals	Monaco	2–2 (4–2 pen.) (H)

Note: H = home fixture, A = away fixture

== Match ==
=== Details ===
7 May 2022
21:00 CEST

Nice	0–1	Nantes
	Report	Blas 47' (pen.)

Stade de France, Saint-Denis
Attendance: 78,961
Referee: Stéphanie Frappart

Nice	Nantes

GK	1	(Poland) Marcin Bułka
RB	23	(Switzerland) Jordan Lotomba
CB	25	(France) Jean-Clair Todibo	(yellow card) 42'
CB	4	(Brazil) Dante (c)	(yellow card) 79'
LB	26	(France) Melvin Bard		(substituted off) 86'
RM	28	(Algeria) Hicham Boudaoui	(yellow card) 55'	(substituted off) 57'
CM	8	(Netherlands) Pablo Rosario		(substituted off) 63'
CM	19	(France) Khéphren Thuram
LM	11	(France) Amine Gouiri
CF	7	(Algeria) Andy Delort
CF	9	(Denmark) Kasper Dolberg		(substituted off) 63'
Substitutes:
GK	40	(Argentina) Walter Benítez
DF	5	(Austria) Flavius Daniliuc
DF	12	(France) Jordan Amavi
MF	6	(France) Morgan Schneiderlin
MF	14	(Algeria) Billal Brahimi		(substituted on) 63'
MF	18	(Gabon) Mario Lemina	(yellow card) 90+3'	(substituted on) 63'
FW	21	(Netherlands) Justin Kluivert		(substituted on) 57'
FW	22	(Netherlands) Calvin Stengs
FW	24	(France) Evann Guessand		(substituted on) 86'
Manager:
(France) Christophe Galtier

GK	1	(France) Alban Lafont
CB	21	(Cameroon) Jean-Charles Castelletto
CB	3	(Brazil) Andrei Girotto
CB	4	(France) Nicolas Pallois
RM	11	(France) Marcus Coco		(substituted off) 83'
CM	18	(Democratic Republic of the Congo) Samuel Moutoussamy
CM	5	(Spain) Pedro Chirivella		(substituted off) 72'
LM	29	(France) Quentin Merlin
RF	10	(France) Ludovic Blas (c)
CF	23	(France) Randal Kolo Muani	(yellow card) 90+3'
LF	27	(Nigeria) Moses Simon		(substituted off) 73'
Substitutes:
GK	16	(France) Rémy Descamps
DF	2	(Brazil) Fábio		(substituted on) 83'
DF	12	(France) Dennis Appiah
DF	24	(France) Sébastien Corchia
MF	6	(France) Roli Pereira de Sa
MF	8	(France) Wylan Cyprien		(substituted on) 72'
FW	7	(Mali) Kalifa Coulibaly
FW	20	(France) Jean-Kévin Augustin
FW	26	(Ghana) Osman Bukari		(substituted on) 73'
Manager:
(France) Antoine Kombouaré

Assistant referees:
Mikaël Berchebru
Benjamin Pagès
Fourth official:
Willy Delajod
Video assistant referees:
Jérémie Pignard
Hamid Guenaoui

Match rules

- 90 minutes
- 30 minutes of extra time if necessary
- Penalty shoot-out if scores still level
- Nine named substitutes
- Maximum of five substitutions, with a sixth allowed in extra time (Note: Each team was given only three opportunities to make substitutions, with a fourth opportunity in extra time, excluding substitutions made at half-time, before the start of extra time and at half-time in extra time.)
