= Oumar Ngom =

Mauritanian footballer (born 2004)

Personal information
- Date of birth: 9 March 2004 (age 22)
- Place of birth: Niort, France
- Height: 1.84 m (6 ft 0 in)
- Position: Midfielder

Team information
- Current team: Lecce
- Number: 79

Youth career
- 2012–2021: Niort

Senior career*
Years	Team	Apps	(Gls)
2021–2023	Niort II	31	(3)
2021–2023	Niort	2	(0)
2023–2024	Pau II	3	(1)
2023–2025	Pau	44	(3)
2025–2026	Estrela da Amadora	11	(0)
2026–	Lecce	15	(0)

International career^{‡}
2021–2023	Mauritania U17	3	(1)
2024–	Mauritania	13	(0)
- * Club domestic league appearances and goals as of 25 May 2026 ‡ National team caps and goals as of 16:49, 12 January 2026 (UTC)

Oumar Ngom (born 9 March 2004) is a professional footballer who plays as a midfielder for Serie A club Lecce. Born in France, he plays for the Mauritania national team.

== Club career ==
Having grown up between Tillou and Chef-Boutonne, Oumar Ngom went through the youth ranks of the Niort, starting to play with the reserve team in National 3 during the 2021–22 season.

First appearing in the main team squad in early 2022, he made his professional debut for Niort on 5 March 2022, replacing Nacim El Hassani at the 61st minute of a 0–1 Ligue 2 home loss to AC Ajaccio.

=== Pau FC ===
On 9 July 2023, Ngom signed his first professional contract with Pau FC.

=== Estrela da Amadora ===
On 14 August 2025, Ngom moved to Portugal, joining Primeira Liga club Estrela da Amadora on a four-year contract, for a reported fee of €300.000.

=== Lecce ===
On 13 January 2026, Ngom moved to Italy, joining Serie A club Lecce on a contract until 30 June 2029, for a reported fee of €4 million, which could rise to €5.5 million with add-ons.

== International career ==
Of Senegalese and Mauritanian descent—his father, Cheikh Ngom, was a Mauritania international in the '80s—, he became a youth international for his father's country, playing the Africa U-17 Cup of Nations qualification in 2021 and scoring a goal despite his team failing to reach the final tournament.
