= 2021–22 FC Nantes season =

FC Nantes
2021–22 season
- Owner: Waldemar Kita
- President: Waldemar Kita
- Head coach: Antoine Kombouaré
- Stadium: Stade de la Beaujoire
- Ligue 1: 9th
- Coupe de France: Winners
- Top goalscorer: League: Randal Kolo Muani (12); All: Ludovic Blas (15)
Home colours	Away colours	Third colours

The 2021–22 season was the 78th season in the existence of FC Nantes and the club's 9th consecutive season in the top flight of French football. In addition to the domestic league, Nantes participated in this season's edition of the Coupe de France.

== Players ==
=== First-team squad ===
Note: Flags indicate national team as defined under FIFA eligibility rules; some limited exceptions apply. Players may hold more than one non-FIFA nationality.

No.	Pos.	Nation	Player
1	GK	FRA	Alban Lafont (captain)
2	DF	BRA	Fábio
3	DF	BRA	Andrei Girotto
4	DF	FRA	Nicolas Pallois (vice-captain)
5	MF	ESP	Pedro Chirivella
6	MF	FRA	Roli Pereira de Sa
7	FW	MLI	Kalifa Coulibaly
8	MF	FRA	Wylan Cyprien (on loan from Parma)
10	MF	FRA	Ludovic Blas
11	FW	FRA	Marcus Coco
12	DF	FRA	Dennis Appiah
14	DF	MLI	Charles Traoré

No.	Pos.	Nation	Player
16	GK	FRA	Rémy Descamps
18	MF	COD	Samuel Moutoussamy
19	FW	FRA	Willem Geubbels (on loan from Monaco)
20	FW	FRA	Jean-Kévin Augustin
21	DF	CMR	Jean-Charles Castelletto
23	FW	FRA	Randal Kolo Muani
24	DF	FRA	Sébastien Corchia
26	FW	GHA	Osman Bukari (on loan from Gent)
27	MF	NGR	Moses Simon
29	MF	FRA	Quentin Merlin
30	GK	SLO	Denis Petrić

=== Out on loan ===
Note: Flags indicate national team as defined under FIFA eligibility rules; some limited exceptions apply. Players may hold more than one non-FIFA nationality.

No.	Pos.	Nation	Player
—	MF	FRA	Abou Ba (on loan at Alessandria)
—	FW	FRA	Kader Bamba (on loan at Amiens)

No.	Pos.	Nation	Player
—	FW	FRA	Bridge Ndilu (on loan at Quevilly-Rouen)

== Transfers ==
=== In ===
No.	Pos.	Nation	Player
1	GK	FRA	Alban Lafont (from (Italy) Fiorentina, previously on loan)
8	MF	FRA	Wylan Cyprien (on loan from (Italy) Parma)
16	GK	FRA	Rémy Descamps (from (Belgium) Charleroi)
26	FW	GHA	Osman Bukari (on loan from (Belgium) Gent)

=== Out ===
No.	Pos.	Nation	Player
15	DF	FRA	Thomas Basila (to (Belgium) Oostende)
26	MF	FRA	Imran Louza (to (England) Watford)
29	MF	FRA	Batista Mendy (to Angers)
—	GK	FRA	Alexandre Olliero (to Pau, previously on loan)
—	MF	BRA	Lucas Evangelista (to (Brazil) Red Bull Bragantino, previously on loan)
—	FW	FRA	Élie Youan (to (Switzerland) St. Gallen, previously on loan)

== Pre-season and friendlies ==
Win Draw Loss

14 July 2021 Friendly	Nantes	1–0	Guingamp	Pornic, France
17:00 CEST (UTC+2)	Emond 50'	Report		Stadium: Stade du Val Saint-Martin

17 July 2021 Challenge Emiliano Sala	Caen	1–0	Nantes	Orléans, France
15:00 CEST (UTC+2)	Court 61'	Report		Stadium: Stade de la Source; Attendance: 300

18 July 2021 Challenge Emiliano Sala	Niort	1–0	Nantes	Orléans, France
14:00 CEST (UTC+2)	Ansart 80'	Report		Stadium: Stade de la Source; Attendance: 400

24 July 2021 Friendly	Brest	1–3	Nantes	Brest, France
11:00 CEST (UTC+2)	Mounié 17'	Report	Emond 5', 61'; Pereira de Sa 25'	Stadium: Stade Francis-Le Blé

28 July 2021 Friendly	Nantes	0–1	Lorient	France
18:00 CEST (UTC+2)		Report	Loric 79'

31 July 2021 Friendly	Nantes	1–2	Clermont	Indre-et-Loire, France
16:00 CEST (UTC+2)	Blas (yellow card) 29'; Girotto (yellow card) 63'; Moutoussamy 90'	Report	Ogier (yellow card) 31'; Tell 60' (pen.); Dossou 79'; Seidu (yellow card) 81'	Stadium: Stade Marcel Vignaud; Referee: Amaury Delerue

31 July 2021 Friendly	Watford	Cancelled	Nantes	Watford, England
18:00 CEST (UTC+2)				Stadium: Vicarage Road

== Competitions ==
=== Overall record ===
Competition	First match	Last match	Starting round	Final position	Record							
Competition	First match	Last match	Starting round	Final position	Pld	W	D	L	GF	GA	GD	Win %
Ligue 1	6 August 2021	21 May 2022	Matchday 1	9th	38	15	10	13	55	48	+7	39.47
Coupe de France	18 December 2021	7 May 2022	Round of 64	Winners	6	4	2	0	9	2	+7	66.67
Total					44	19	12	13	64	50	+14	43.18

Source: Soccerway

=== Ligue 1 ===
==== League table ====
Pos	Team	Pld	W	D	L	GF	GA	GD	Pts	Qualification or relegation
7	Lens	38	17	11	10	62	48	+14	62	
8	Lyon	38	17	11	10	66	51	+15	61 (Note: Lyon were deducted one point for uncontrolled crowd trouble that caused the abandonment of their match against Marseille.)	
9	Nantes	38	15	10	13	55	48	+7	55	Qualification for the Europa League group stage (Note: Nantes qualified for the Europa League group stage as the 2021–22 Coupe de France winners.)
10	Lille	38	14	13	11	48	48	0	55	
11	Brest	38	13	9	16	49	57	−8	48	

Source: Ligue 1
Rules for classification: 1) Points; 2) Goal difference; 3) Head-to-head points; 4) Head-to-head goal difference; 5) Head-to-head goals scored; 6) Head-to-head away goals scored; 7) Goals scored; 8) Away goals scored; 9) Fair-play points (Note: Head-to-head record is used only after all the matches between the teams in question have been played).

==== Results summary ====
Overall								Home						Away					
Pld	W	D	L	GF	GA	GD	Pts	W	D	L	GF	GA	GD	W	D	L	GF	GA	GD
38	15	10	13	55	48	+7	55	11	4	4	33	20	+13	4	6	9	22	28	−6

Source: Ligue 1

==== Results by round ====
Round	1	2	3	4	5	6	7	8	9	10	11	12	13	14	15	16	17	18	19	20	21	22	23	24	25	26	27	28	29	30	31	32	33	34	35	36	37	38
Ground	A	H	A	H	H	A	H	A	H	A	H	A	H	A	A	H	A	H	A	H	A	H	A	H	H	A	H	A	H	A	A	H	A	H	A	H	A	H
Result	D	W	L	L	L	W	W	L	W	D	W	L	D	L	D	L	W	W	W	D	L	W	L	W	W	D	W	L	L	W	D	D	L	W	D	W	L	D
Position	12	5	9	12	14	10	8	10	9	9	7	9	10	11	10	13	13	10	7	9	9	10	10	9	7	7	6	7	9	8	9	10	10	10	9	9	9	9

Source: Ligue 1
A = Away; H = Home; W = Win; D = Draw; L = Loss

==== Matches ====
The league fixtures were announced on 25 June 2021.

6 August 2021 1	Monaco	1–1	Nantes	Monaco
21:00 CEST (UTC+2)	Martins 13'	Report	Castelletto 41'	Stadium: Stade Louis II; Attendance: 7,500; Referee: Antony Gautier

15 August 2021 2	Nantes	2–0	Metz	Nantes
15:00 CEST (UTC+2)	Kolo Muani 12'; Blas 49', (yellow card) 52'; Coco (yellow card) 90'	Report		Stadium: Stade de la Beaujoire; Attendance: 12,054; Referee: Johan Hamel

22 August 2021 3	Rennes	1–0	Nantes	Rennes
17:00 CEST (UTC+2)	Traoré (yellow card) 11'; Terrier 58'; Sulemana (yellow card) 79'	Report	Blas (yellow card) 27'; Castelletto (yellow card) 57'	Stadium: Roazhon Park; Attendance: 27,569; Referee: Stéphanie Frappart

27 August 2021 4	Nantes	0–1	Lyon	Nantes
21:00 CEST (UTC+2)	Fábio (yellow card) 7'; Kolo Muani (yellow card) 90+3'	Report	Dembélé 35'; Da Silva (yellow card) 43' (yellow-red card) 78'	Stadium: Stade de la Beaujoire; Attendance: 23,177; Referee: Jérôme Brisard

12 September 2021 5	Nantes	0–2	Nice	Nantes
17:00 CEST (UTC+2)	Girotto (yellow card) 31'; Fábio (yellow card) 51'	Report	Boudaoui (yellow card) 33'; Lemina (yellow card) 64'; Dante (yellow card) 65'; Dolberg 75'; Gouiri 80'	Stadium: Stade de la Beaujoire; Attendance: 14,597; Referee: Benoît Millot

19 September 2021 6	Angers	1–4	Nantes	Angers
15:00 CEST (UTC+2)	Traoré 10'; Fulgini (yellow card) 24'; Mangani (yellow card) 45+4'	Report	Girotto 3'; Blas 6' (pen.), 79'; Kolo Muani 23'; Simon (yellow card) 25'; Chirivella (yellow card) 45+2'	Stadium: Stade Raymond Kopa; Attendance: 9,046; Referee: Amaury Delerue

22 September 2021 7	Nantes	3–1	Brest	Nantes
19:00 CEST (UTC+2)	Blas 27'; Castelletto (yellow card) 31'; Chirivella 55'; Brassier 58' (o.g.)	Report	Chardonnet (yellow card) 52'; Le Douaron 67'; Brassier (yellow card) 85'	Stadium: Stade de la Beaujoire; Attendance: 19,676; Referee: Thomas Léonard

26 September 2021 8	Reims	3–1	Nantes	Reims
15:00 CEST (UTC+2)	Foket (yellow card) 15', (goal) 51'; Ekitike 72', 78'	Report	Simon (yellow card) 25', (goal) 62'	Stadium: Stade Auguste-Delaune; Attendance: 280; Referee: Eric Wattellier

3 October 2021 9	Nantes	2–0	Troyes	Nantes
15:00 CEST (UTC+2)	Castelletto (yellow card) 45+1'; Girotto 58'; Blas 69' (pen.); Chirivella (yellow card) 90+1'	Report	Rodrigues (yellow card) 66'; Chadli (yellow card) 83'	Stadium: Stade de la Beaujoire; Attendance: 15,150; Referee: Jérôme Brisard

17 October 2021 10	Bordeaux	1–1	Nantes	Bordeaux
15:00 CEST (UTC+2)	Otávio (yellow card) 57'; Hwang 62'; Koscielny (yellow card) 85'	Report	Fábio (yellow card) 42'; Pallois (yellow card) 45+1'; Moutoussamy (yellow card) 68'; Chirivella 75'	Stadium: Matmut Atlantique; Attendance: 39,510; Referee: Willy Delajod

23 October 2021 11	Nantes	2–1	Clermont	Nantes
17:00 CEST (UTC+2)	Fábio (yellow card) 36'; Girotto 38'; Corchia (red card) 39'; Blas 61'	Report	Gastien (red card) 30'; Bayo 49'	Stadium: Stade de la Beaujoire; Attendance: 19,968; Referee: Romain Lissorgue

31 October 2021 12	Montpellier	2–0	Nantes	Montpellier
15:00 CET (UTC+1)	Savanier (yellow card) 37'; Sakho (yellow card) 42'; Mollet 64'; Wahi 71'; Ferri (yellow card) 90+2'	Report	Appiah (yellow card) 35'; Traoré (yellow card) 44'; Pallois (yellow card) 73'; Girotto (yellow card) 90'; Castelletto (yellow card) 90+2'	Stadium: Stade de la Mosson; Attendance: 11,267; Referee: Bastien Dechepy

7 November 2021 13	Nantes	2–2	Strasbourg	Nantes
15:00 CET (UTC+1)	Pallois (yellow card) 5'; Coulibaly 20'; Kolo Muani 48'	Report	Diallo 44'; Thomasson 68'	Stadium: Stade de la Beaujoire; Attendance: 18,853; Referee: Clément Turpin

20 November 2021 14	Paris Saint-Germain	3–1	Nantes	Paris
17:00 CET (UTC+1)	Mbappé 2'; Navas (red card) 65'; Verratti (yellow card) 71'; Appiah 82' (o.g.); Messi 87'	Report	Chirivella (yellow card) 39'; Kolo Muani 76'; Blas (yellow card) 83'	Stadium: Parc des Princes; Attendance: 47,777; Referee: Jérémy Stinat

27 November 2021 15	Lille	1–1	Nantes	Villeneuve-d'Ascq
17:00 CET (UTC+1)	Yılmaz 9'; Onana (yellow card) 62'; David (penalty missed) 79'	Report	Girotto (yellow card) 21'; Blas 24', (yellow card) 48'; Fábio (red card) 78'	Stadium: Stade Pierre-Mauroy; Attendance: 30,419; Referee: Johan Hamel

1 December 2021 16	Nantes	0–1	Marseille	Nantes
21:00 CET (UTC+1)	Pallois (yellow card) 14' (yellow-red card) 32'; Lafont (yellow card) 78'	Report	Gerson 30', (yellow card) 71'; Álvaro (yellow card) 78'	Stadium: Stade de la Beaujoire; Attendance: 34,018; Referee: Eric Wattellier

5 December 2021 17	Lorient	0–1	Nantes	Lorient
15:00 CET (UTC+1)	Ouattara (yellow card) 26'	Report	Coulibaly (yellow card) 18'; Moutoussamy (yellow card) 48'; Cyprien 83'; Girotto (yellow card) 90+1'	Stadium: Stade du Moustoir; Attendance: 16,025; Referee: Ruddy Buquet

10 December 2021 18	Nantes	3–2	Lens	Nantes
21:00 CET (UTC+1)	Girotto (yellow card) 31'; Kolo Muani 49', 57'; Blas (yellow card) 60'; Chirivella (yellow card) 76'; Simon 90'	Report	Costa 7'; Kalimuendo 15'; Haïdara (yellow card) 46'; Gradit (yellow card) 60'; Medina (yellow card) 61'	Stadium: Stade de la Beaujoire; Attendance: 21,890; Referee: Stephanie Frappart

22 December 2021 19	Saint-Étienne	0–1	Nantes	Saint-Étienne
21:00 CET (UTC+1)	Moueffek (yellow card) 90+3'	Report	Castelletto (yellow card) 71'; Kolo Muani 83'	Stadium: Stade Geoffroy-Guichard; Attendance: 23,681; Referee: Clément Turpin

9 January 2022 20	Nantes	0–0	Monaco	Nantes
17:05 CET (UTC+1)	Kolo Muani (yellow card) 22'	Report	Diop (yellow card) 72'; Matazo (yellow card) 80'	Stadium: Stade de la Beaujoire; Attendance: 4,133; Referee: Thomas Léonard

14 January 2022 21	Nice	2–1	Nantes	Nice
21:00 CET (UTC+1)	Dolberg 21' (pen.); Dante (yellow card) 44'; Thuram 56'; Amavi (yellow card) 64'	Report	Sylla (yellow card) 15'; Girotto 45'	Stadium: Allianz Riviera; Attendance: 5,000; Referee: Ruddy Buquet

23 January 2022 22	Nantes	4–2	Lorient	Nantes
15:00 CET (UTC+1)	Girotto 39'; Moutoussamy (yellow card) 45+1'; Kolo Muani 53'; Bukari 69'; Fábio (yellow card) 77'; Appiah (yellow card) 83'; Geubbels 86'	Report	Moffi 56'; Soumano 85'	Stadium: Stade de la Beaujoire; Attendance: 4,275; Referee: Pierre Gaillouste

6 February 2022 23	Strasbourg	1–0	Nantes	Strasbourg
15:00 CET (UTC+1)	Nyamsi (yellow card) 53'; Liénard 74', (yellow card) 82'; Sels (yellow card) 90'	Report	Chirivella (yellow card) 23'; Pallois (yellow card) 48'; Geubbels (yellow card) 78'	Stadium: Stade de la Meinau; Attendance: 22,240; Referee: Amaury Delerue

13 February 2022 24	Nantes	1–0	Reims	Nantes
15:00 CET (UTC+1)	Simon 17'; Girotto (yellow card) 53'	Report	Abdelhamid (red card) 14'	Stadium: Stade de la Beaujoire; Attendance: 14,304; Referee: Johan Hamel

19 February 2022 25	Nantes	3–1	Paris Saint-Germain	Nantes
21:00 CET (UTC+1)	Kolo Muani 4'; Merlin 16'; Castelletto (yellow card) 18'; Appiah (yellow card) 45+1'; Blas 45+5' (pen.)	Report	Verratti (yellow card) 38'; Wijnaldum (yellow card) 45+4'; Neymar 47', (yellow card) 50', (penalty missed) 59'; Mbappé (yellow card) 83'; Hakimi (yellow card) 90+1'; Di María (yellow card) 90+3'	Stadium: Stade de la Beaujoire; Attendance: 35,500; Referee: Mikael Lesage

27 February 2022 26	Metz	0–0	Nantes	Metz
15:00 CET (UTC+1)	Amadou (yellow card) 59'; Pajot (red card) 86'	Report	Cyprien (yellow card) 40'; Traoré (yellow card) 51'	Stadium: Stade Saint-Symphorien; Attendance: 15,851; Referee: Florent Batta

6 March 2022 27	Nantes	2–0	Montpellier	Nantes
15:00 CET (UTC+1)	Castelletto (yellow card) 30'; Kolo Muani 69'; Geubbels 90+2'	Report	Ristić (yellow card) 79'	Stadium: Stade de la Beaujoire; Attendance: 21,589; Referee: Hakim Ben El Hadj

12 March 2022 28	Troyes	1–0	Nantes	Troyes
21:00 CET (UTC+1)	Ugbo 43'; Conté (yellow card) 47'	Report	Simon (yellow card) 63'	Stadium: Stade de l'Aube; Attendance: 7,400; Referee: Stéphanie Frappart

19 March 2022 29	Nantes	0–1	Lille	Nantes
21:00 CET (UTC+1)	Moutoussamy (yellow card) 53'; Blas (yellow card) 81'; Fábio (yellow card) 86'	Report	Xeka (yellow card) 15'; Onana 41'; Weah (red card) 64'; André (yellow card) 64'; Bamba (yellow card) 79'; Bradarić (yellow card) 86'	Stadium: Stade de la Beaujoire; Attendance: 25,977; Referee: Pierre Gaillouste

3 April 2022 30	Clermont	2–3	Nantes	Clermont-Ferrand
15:00 CEST (UTC+2)	Abdul Samed (yellow card) 30', (goal) 63', (red card) 72'; Ogier (yellow card) 34'; Magnin (yellow card) 43'; Khaoui 58'; Zedadka (yellow card) 88'; Seidu (yellow card) 90+3'	Report	Girotto (yellow card) 35'; Blas 43' (pen.); Chirivella 62'; Kolo Muani 67'	Stadium: Stade Gabriel Montpied; Attendance: 11,785; Referee: Mikael Lesage

10 April 2022 31	Brest	1–1	Nantes	Brest
15:00 CEST (UTC+2)	Hérelle (yellow card) 64'; Chardonnet 67'	Report	Kolo Muani 10'; Chirivella (yellow card) 43'; Castelletto (yellow card) 70'; Fábio (yellow card) 90+4'	Stadium: Stade Francis-Le Blé; Attendance: 13,145; Referee: Johan Hamel

17 April 2022 32	Nantes	1–1	Angers	Nantes
15:00 CEST (UTC+2)	Lafont (yellow card) 45+5'; Coulibaly 53'; Blas (yellow card) 70'; Girotto (yellow card) 90'; Pallois (yellow card) 90+2'	Report	Boufal 18'; Thomas (yellow card) 50'	Stadium: Stade de la Beaujoire; Attendance: 25,102; Referee: Bastien Dechepy

20 April 2022 33	Marseille	3–2	Nantes	Marseille
21:00 CEST (UTC+2)	Peres (yellow card) 35'; Payet 39' (pen.), 55' (pen.); Harit 75'; Milik (yellow card) 87'	Report	Girotto 26'; Blas (yellow card) 32'; Coco 41', (yellow card) 45+1' (yellow-red card) 90+3'; Fábio (yellow card) 81'; Appiah (yellow card) 90+1'	Stadium: Stade Vélodrome; Attendance: 55,890; Referee: Ruddy Buquet

24 April 2022 34	Nantes	5–3	Bordeaux	Nantes
15:00 CEST (UTC+2)	Coulibaly 47', 72'; Mangas 51' (o.g.); Simon 76'; Bukari 89', (yellow card) 90+1'	Report	Niang 6'; Marcelo (yellow card) 15'; Dilrosun 18'; Kwateng 68'; Briand (penalty missed) 88'	Stadium: Stade de la Beaujoire; Attendance: 23,953; Referee: Clément Turpin

30 April 2022 35	Lens	2–2	Nantes	Lens
17:00 CEST (UTC+2)	Leca (red card) 19'; Costa 67'; Kalimuendo 81' (pen.)	Report	Simon 8', 32'; Pereira de Sa (yellow card) 53'; Cyprien (yellow card) 62'; Moutoussamy (yellow card) 74'; Pallois (yellow card) 80'; Lafont (yellow card) 81'	Stadium: Stade Bollaert-Delelis; Attendance: 36,727; Referee: Thomas Léonard

11 May 2022 36	Nantes	2–1	Rennes	Nantes
21:00 CEST (UTC+2)	Coulibaly 45'; Cyprien (yellow card) 67'; Pallois 71'; Blas (yellow card) 86'	Report	Tait 32', (yellow card) 90'	Stadium: Stade de la Beaujoire; Attendance: 26,359; Referee: Antony Gautier

14 May 2022 37	Lyon	3–2	Nantes	Décines-Charpieu
21:00 CEST (UTC+2)	Dembélé 9'; Ndombele (yellow card) 61'; Paquetá 78'; Tetê 84'	Report	Merlin 80'; Cyprien 90+2'	Stadium: Groupama Stadium; Attendance: 54,404; Referee: Florent Batta

21 May 2022 38	Nantes	1–1	Saint-Étienne	Nantes
21:00 CEST (UTC+2)	Blas 23' (pen.), (yellow card) 36'; Augustin (yellow card) 85'	Report	Hamouma 79'	Stadium: Stade de la Beaujoire; Attendance: 28,636; Referee: François Letexier

=== Coupe de France ===
18 December 2021 Round of 64	Sochaux	0–0 (4–5 p)	Nantes	Montbéliard
16:00 CET (UTC+1)	Viltard (yellow card) 86'	Report	Coco (yellow card) 63'; Moutoussamy (yellow card) 90+3'	Stadium: Stade Auguste Bonal; Attendance: 8,001; Referee: Benoît Bastien
	Penalties
	Faraj (penalty scored); Viltard (penalty scored); Do Couto (penalty scored); Senaya (penalty scored); Diedhiou (penalty missed)		(penalty scored) Pereira de Sa; (penalty scored) Moutoussamy; (penalty scored) Corchia; (penalty scored) Coco; (penalty scored) Pallois

2 January 2022 Round of 32	Nantes	2–0	AS Vitré	Nantes (Note: Tie reversed due to AS Vitré not being able to provide a stadium of the required standard.)
13:45 CET (UTC+1)	Blas 25'; Geubbels 67'	Report		Stadium: Stade de la Beaujoire; Attendance: 9,555; Referee: Eric Wattellier

28 January 2022 Round of 16	Nantes	2–0	Brest	Nantes
21:00 CET (UTC+1)	Blas 25', 53'	Report	Brassier (yellow card) 33'; Hérelle (yellow card) 51'; Chardonnet (yellow card) 72'	Stadium: Stade de la Beaujoire; Attendance: 5,000; Referee: Benoît Bastien

10 February 2022 Quarter-finals	Nantes	2–0	Bastia	Nantes
21:00 CET (UTC+1)	Blas 3' (pen.); Kolo Muani 71'	Report	Sainati (yellow card) 1'; Robic (yellow card) 85'	Stadium: Stade de la Beaujoire; Attendance: 24,862; Referee: Antony Gautier

2 March 2022 Semi-finals	Nantes	2–2 (4–2 p)	Monaco	Nantes
21:15 CET (UTC+1)	Sidibé 21' (o.g.); Moutoussamy 74'	Report	Maripán 12'; Boadu 76'	Stadium: Stade de la Beaujoire; Attendance: 33,929; Referee: Benoît Bastien
	Penalties
	Kolo Muani (penalty scored); Merlin (penalty scored); Moutoussamy (penalty scored); Simon (penalty scored)		(penalty missed) Ben Yedder; (penalty scored) Disasi; (penalty missed) Tchouaméni; (penalty scored) Volland

7 May 2022 Final	Nice	0–1	Nantes	Saint-Denis
21:00 CEST (UTC+2)	Todibo (yellow card) 42'; Boudaoui (yellow card) 55'; Dante (yellow card) 79'; Lemina (yellow card) 90+3'	Report	Blas 47' (pen.); Kolo Muani (yellow card) 90+3'	Stadium: Stade de France; Attendance: 78,961; Referee: Stéphanie Frappart

== Statistics ==
=== Goalscorers ===
Position	Players	Ligue 1	Coupe de France	Total
MF	(France) Ludovic Blas	10	5	15
FW	(France) Randal Kolo Muani	12	1	13
DF	(Brazil) Andrei Girotto	6	0	6
FW	(Nigeria) Moses Simon	6	0	6
FW	(Mali) Kalifa Coulibaly	5	0	5
MF	(Spain) Pedro Chirivella	3	0	3
FW	(France) Willem Geubbels	2	1	3
MF	(Ghana) Osman Bukari	2	0	2
MF	(France) Wylan Cyprien	2	0	2
MF	(France) Quentin Merlin	2	0	2
DF	(Cameroon) Jean-Charles Castelletto	1	0	1
FW	(France) Marcus Coco	1	0	1
MF	(Democratic Republic of the Congo) Samuel Moutoussamy	0	1	1
DF	(France) Nicolas Pallois	1	0	1
