= 2026–27 AS Nancy Lorraine season =

AS Nancy Lorraine
2026–27 season
- Manager: Benoît Pedretti
- Ligue 2: Pre-season
- Coupe de France: Pre-season

The 2026–27 season is the 60th season in the history of Association Sportive Nancy Lorraine and their second consecutive season in Ligue 2. The club will also compete in the Coupe de France.

== Transfers ==
=== In ===
Pos.	Player	Transferred from	Fee	Date	Source
MF	(Algeria) Issam Bouaoune	(France) Châteauroux	Free	1 July 2026	
FW	(Morocco) Ilyes Housni	(France) Paris Saint-Germain	Undisclosed	1 July 2026	

== Pre-season ==
4 July 2026 Friendly	Nancy (France)	8–0	(Luxembourg) Mamer 32
11:00	Fdaouch 22'; Housni 26'; Tandia 31'; Cissé 33'; Guendez 35', 73'; Kébé 52'; Schnepp 82'

18 July 2026 Friendly	Nancy (France)	2–2	(France) US Thionville Lusitanos
18:00	5', 41'		57', 80'

== Competitions ==
=== Ligue 2 ===
Pos	Team	Pld	W	D	L	GF	GA	GD	Pts	Promotion or Relegation
3	Montpellier	4	2	2	0	3	1	+2	8	Qualification for promotion play-off semi-final
4	Rodez	4	2	1	1	10	7	+3	7	Qualification for promotion play-off quarter-final
5	Nancy	4	2	1	1	3	1	+2	7	Qualification for promotion play-off quarter-final
6	Annecy	4	2	1	1	5	4	+1	7	
7	Metz	4	1	3	0	4	3	+1	6	

Updated to match(es) played on 31 August 2026. Source: Ligue 2
Rules for classification: 1) Points; 2) Goal difference; 3) Number of goals scored; 4) Head-to-head goal difference; 5) Fair play points
