= Pedro Chirivella =

Spanish footballer (born 1997)

- Chirivella with Panathinaikos in 2026

Personal information
- Full name: Pedro Chirivella Burgos
- Date of birth: 23 May 1997 (age 29)
- Place of birth: Valencia, Spain
- Height: 1.78 m (5 ft 10 in)
- Position: Defensive midfielder

Team information
- Current team: Panathinaikos
- Number: 4

Youth career
- 2004–2013: Valencia
- 2013–2016: Liverpool

Senior career*
Years	Team	Apps	(Gls)
2016–2020	Liverpool	1	(0)
2017	→ Go Ahead Eagles (loan)	17	(2)
2017–2018	→ Willem II (loan)	31	(0)
2019	→ Extremadura (loan)	1	(0)
2020–2025	Nantes	151	(4)
2025–	Panathinaikos	22	(0)

International career
2012–2014	Spain U17	15	(2)
- * Club domestic league appearances and goals as of 14 November 2026

Pedro Chirivella Burgos (Spanish pronunciation: [ˈpeðɾo tʃiɾiˈβeʎa]; born 23 May 1997) is a Spanish professional footballer who plays as a defensive midfielder for Greek Super League club Panathinaikos.

He began his professional career at Liverpool, playing 11 games, of which one in the Premier League. He was loaned to Go Ahead Eagles and Willem II in the Dutch Eredivisie before moving to Nantes at the end of his contract in 2020. With them, he won the Coupe de France in 2022.

== Club career ==
=== Liverpool ===
Born in Valencia, Chirivella developed his trade at the academy of local club Valencia CF where he captained the club at various youth levels. He was scouted by a number of European clubs but it was Liverpool who signed him in 2013 along with fellow Spaniard Sergi Canós from Barcelona. In order to aid Chirivella's transition to England, Liverpool moved his family north from Spain and provided them with work and accommodation. He joined up with Liverpool's academy and on 7 July 2014 was one of seven youngsters to be handed a professional contract by the club.

==== 2015–16 season ====
Chirivella received his first taste of senior football when he was included in club manager Brendan Rodgers' squad for Liverpool's pre-season tour of Asia and Australia. During the tour he made his non-competitive debut for Liverpool, coming on as a second-half substitute against HJK Helsinki. He received his first competitive call up later in the season for a UEFA Europa League group stage match against Bordeaux on 17 September 2015. In the 28th minute, following an injury to centre-back Kolo Touré, Chirivella was brought on to make his debut and played out the remainder of a 1–1 draw at the Nouveau Stade de Bordeaux. His next appearance for the club saw him make his FA Cup debut under new manager Jürgen Klopp on 8 January 2016 when he came on as a substitute in a third round match against Exeter City. Liverpool ultimately progressed in the Cup which afforded him the opportunity to make his first start for the club on 9 February in a 2–1 defeat against West Ham United in the fourth round replay. He then signed a new contract with Liverpool on 9 March before making his Premier League debut towards the back end of the season, starting in a 3–1 loss against Swansea City on 1 May.

==== 2016–19: Loans ====
On 6 January 2017, Liverpool announced that Chirivella, who had spent the first half of the season playing for the club's U23 side, would spend the remainder of the season on loan at Eredivisie club, Go Ahead Eagles in order to gain more first team experience. He made his debut for the club a week later, playing the full match in a 3–1 defeat to AZ Alkmaar. The following week, he scored his first professional goal, heading in the opener from Jarchinio Antonia's cross in a 1–1 draw with Excelsior. He ultimately made 17 appearances for the campaign and scored twice but could not help prevent the club avoid relegation at the end of the season.

Chirivella returned to Netherlands on 26 July 2017, after being loaned to Willem II for the season. He made his debut for the club on 13 August, starting in a 2–1 defeat to Excelsior.

On 31 January 2019, he signed for Spanish club Extremadura UD on loan. On 13 February, however, the club announced he could not play for the first team during the remainder of the season, as his transfer documentations arrived after the time limit.

==== 2019–20 season ====
On 3 September 2019, Chirivella was named in Liverpool's 25-man Premier League squad for the 2019–20 season. On 25 September – 3 years and 4 months after his last appearance for Liverpool – he came off the bench in an EFL Cup game against Milton Keynes Dons, replacing Naby Keïta after 63 minutes as his club won 2–0. However, it later emerged that Chirivella was in fact ineligible to feature in the tie, as he did not have international clearance. Liverpool were subsequently fined £200,000 by the FA, half of which was suspended.

=== Nantes ===
On 12 June 2020, Liverpool announced that Chirivella would join French side Nantes when his contract expired at the end of the season. He signed a three-year deal at the Ligue 1 club. He made his debut on 21 August as the season began with a goalless draw at Bordeaux.

Chirivella scored his first goal for Nantes on 22 September 2021, in a 3–1 home win over neighbours Brest; he was named the best player of the match by sports daily L'Équipe. The following 28 April, he extended his contract to 2026, and days later he played as the Canaris defeated Nice 1–0 in the 2022 Coupe de France Final.

In August 2023, manager Pierre Aristouy made Chirivella the club's captain, saying that the player shared his views on how best to play.

=== Panathinaikos ===
On 28 June 2025, Chirivella signed with Super League Greece club Panathinaikos.

== International career ==
Chirivella represented Spain at under-17 level and scored twice for them in 15 appearances.

== Career statistics ==
As of match played 11 August 2026

Appearances and goals by club, season and competition
Club	Season	League			National cup (Note: Includes KNVB Cup, FA Cup, Coupe de France, Greek Cup)		League cup (Note: Includes EFL Cup)		Continental		Other		Total	
Club	Season	League	Apps	Goals	Apps	Goals	Apps	Goals	Apps	Goals	Apps	Goals	Apps	Goals
Go Ahead Eagles (loan)	2016–17	Eredivisie	17	2	0	0	0	0	0	0	—		17	2
Willem II (loan)	2017–18	Eredivisie	31	0	4	0	0	0	0	0	—		35	0
Liverpool	2015–16	Premier League	1	0	3	0	0	0	1 (Note: Appearances in UEFA Europa League)	0	—		5	0
Liverpool	2019–20	Premier League	0	0	3	0	3	0	0	0	—		6	0
Liverpool	Total		1	0	6	0	3	0	1	0	0	0	11	0
Nantes	2020–21	Ligue 1	32	0	1	0	0	0	—		2 (Note: Appearances in Ligue 1 relegation/promotion play-offs)	0	35	0
Nantes	2021–22	Ligue 1	31	3	5	0	0	0	—		0	0	36	3
Nantes	2022–23	Ligue 1	26	0	1	0	0	0	8	0	1 (Note: Appearance in Trophée des Champions)	0	36	0
Nantes	2023–24	Ligue 1	32	0	2	0	—		—		—		34	0
Nantes	2024–25	Ligue 1	30	0	2	0	—		—		—		32	0
Nantes	Total		151	4	11	0	0	0	8	0	3	0	173	4
Panathinaikos	2025–26	Super League Greece	21	0	3	0	—		13 (Note: Two appearances in UEFA Champions League, eleven appearances in UEFA Europa League)	0	—		37	0
Panathinaikos	2026–27	Super League Greece	0	0	0	0	—		4 (Note: UEFA Conference League)	0	—		4	0
Panathinaikos	Total		21	0	3	0	0	0	17	0	0	0	41	0
Career total			221	6	24	0	3	0	23	0	3	0	274	6

== Honours ==
Nantes

- Coupe de France: 2021–22
