= Rémy Descamps =

French footballer (born 1996)

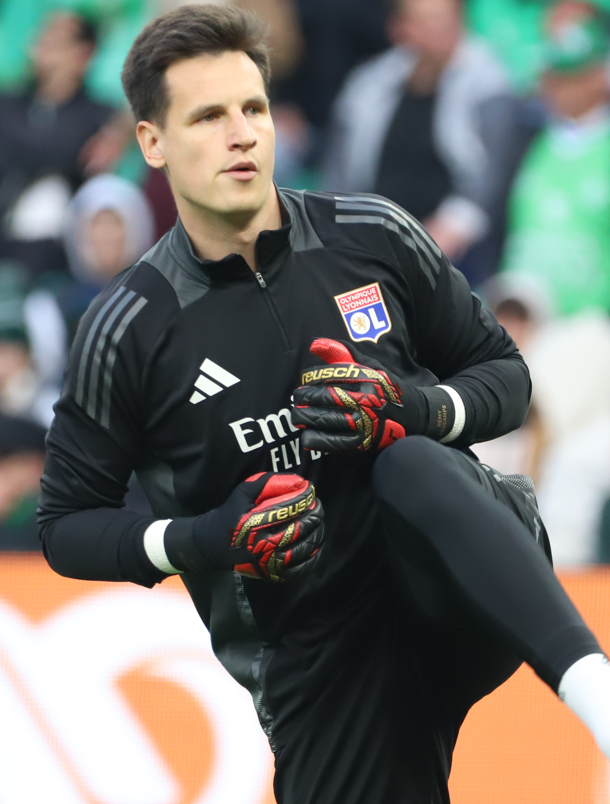
- Descamps in 2025

Personal information
- Full name: Rémy Serge Claude Descamps
- Date of birth: 25 June 1996 (age 30)
- Place of birth: Marcq-en-Barœul, Nord, France
- Height: 1.96 m (6 ft 5 in)
- Position: Goalkeeper

Team information
- Current team: Lyon
- Number: 40

Youth career
- 2002: Verlinghem Football
- 2002–2010: Lille
- 2010–2011: Tarbes
- 2011–2013: Clermont
- 2013–2015: Paris Saint-Germain

Senior career*
Years	Team	Apps	(Gls)
2015–2017	Paris Saint-Germain B	59	(0)
2017–2019	Paris Saint-Germain	0	(0)
2018	→ Tours (loan)	19	(0)
2018–2019	→ Clermont (loan)	28	(0)
2018	→ Clermont B (loan)	1	(0)
2019–2021	Charleroi	14	(0)
2021–2024	Nantes	7	(0)
2024–	Lyon	8	(0)
- * Club domestic league appearances and goals as of 18 October 2026

Rémy Serge Claude Descamps (born 25 June 1996) is a French professional footballer who plays as a goalkeeper for Ligue 1 club Lyon.

== Career ==
=== Paris Saint-Germain ===
Descamps joined the Paris Saint-Germain Youth Academy in 2013. In 2016, he reached the UEFA Youth League final with the club’s U19 side. Descamps signed his first professional contract with the Paris Saint-Germain senior side in May 2016.

In January 2018, Descamps was loaned to Ligue 2 side Tours. He made his debut for Tours in a 2–1 Coupe de France away win to Chartres on 6 January 2018, playing the full 90 minutes. During his loan spell, he made 21 appearances for the club in all competitions. On 21 August 2018, Descamps signed a three-year contract extension with Paris Saint-Germain, before being loaned to Clermont for a season without an option to buy.

=== Charleroi ===
In August 2019, Descamps signed for Charleroi, replacing Rémy Riou, who was transferred away to Caen.

=== Nantes ===
On 23 June 2021, Descamps joined returned to France to sign for Ligue 1 club Nantes. He penned a three-year deal at the club. Descamps played an important role in Nantes' 2021–22 Coupe de France winning campaign, keeping 4 out of 5 clean sheats in the road to the final, and being decisive in both penalty shootouts against Sochaux in the Round of 64 and Monaco in the semi-finals. Despite these performances, he did not play in the final as the coach preferred to start the first choice goalkeeper Alban Lafont.

=== Lyon ===
On 23 August 2024, Descamps joined Ligue 1 fellow Lyon as a free agent, signing a three-year contract.

== Career statistics ==
As of match played 18 October 2026

Appearances and goals by club, season and competition
Club	Season	League			National cup (Note: Includes Coupe de France, Belgian Cup)		Europe		Other		Total	
Club	Season	Division	Apps	Goals	Apps	Goals	Apps	Goals	Apps	Goals	Apps	Goals
Paris Saint-Germain B	2015–16	CFA	20	0	—		—		—		20	0
Paris Saint-Germain B	2016–17	CFA	25	0	—		—		—		25	0
Paris Saint-Germain B	2017–18	CFA	14	0	—		—		—		14	0
Paris Saint-Germain B	Total		59	0	0	0	0	0	0	0	59	0
Paris Saint-Germain	2016–17	Ligue 1	0	0	0	0	0	0	0	0	0	0
Paris Saint-Germain	2017–18	Ligue 1	0	0	0	0	0	0	0	0	0	0
Paris Saint-Germain	Total		0	0	0	0	0	0	0	0	0	0
Tours (loan)	2017–18	Ligue 2	19	0	2	0	—		—		21	0
Clermont (loan)	2018–19	Ligue 2	28	0	0	0	—		—		28	0
Clermont B (loan)	2018–19	CFA 2	1	0	—		—		—		1	0
Charleroi	2019–20	Belgian Pro League	0	0	0	0	—		—		0	0
Charleroi	2020–21	Belgian Pro League	14	0	2	0	0	0	—		16	0
Charleroi	Total		14	0	2	0	0	0	0	0	16	0
Nantes	2021–22	Ligue 1	0	0	5	0	—		—		5	0
Nantes	2022–23	Ligue 1	1	0	5	0	0	0	0	0	6	0
Nantes	2023–24	Ligue 1	6	0	0	0	—		—		6	0
Nantes	Total		7	0	10	0	0	0	0	0	17	0
Lyon	2024–25	Ligue 1	1	0	1	0	1 (Note: Appearance in UEFA Europa League)	0	—		3	0
Lyon	2025–26	Ligue 1	5	0	4	0	4	0	—		13	0
Lyon	2026–27	Ligue 1	2	0	0	0	1	0	—		3	0
Lyon	Total		8	0	5	0	6	0	—		19	0
Career total			136	0	19	0	6	0	0	0	161	0

== Honours ==
Paris Saint-Germain U19

- Championnat National U19: 2015–16
- UEFA Youth League runner-up: 2015–16

Nantes

- Coupe de France: 2021–22
