= Yohan Cassubie =

French footballer (born 2000)

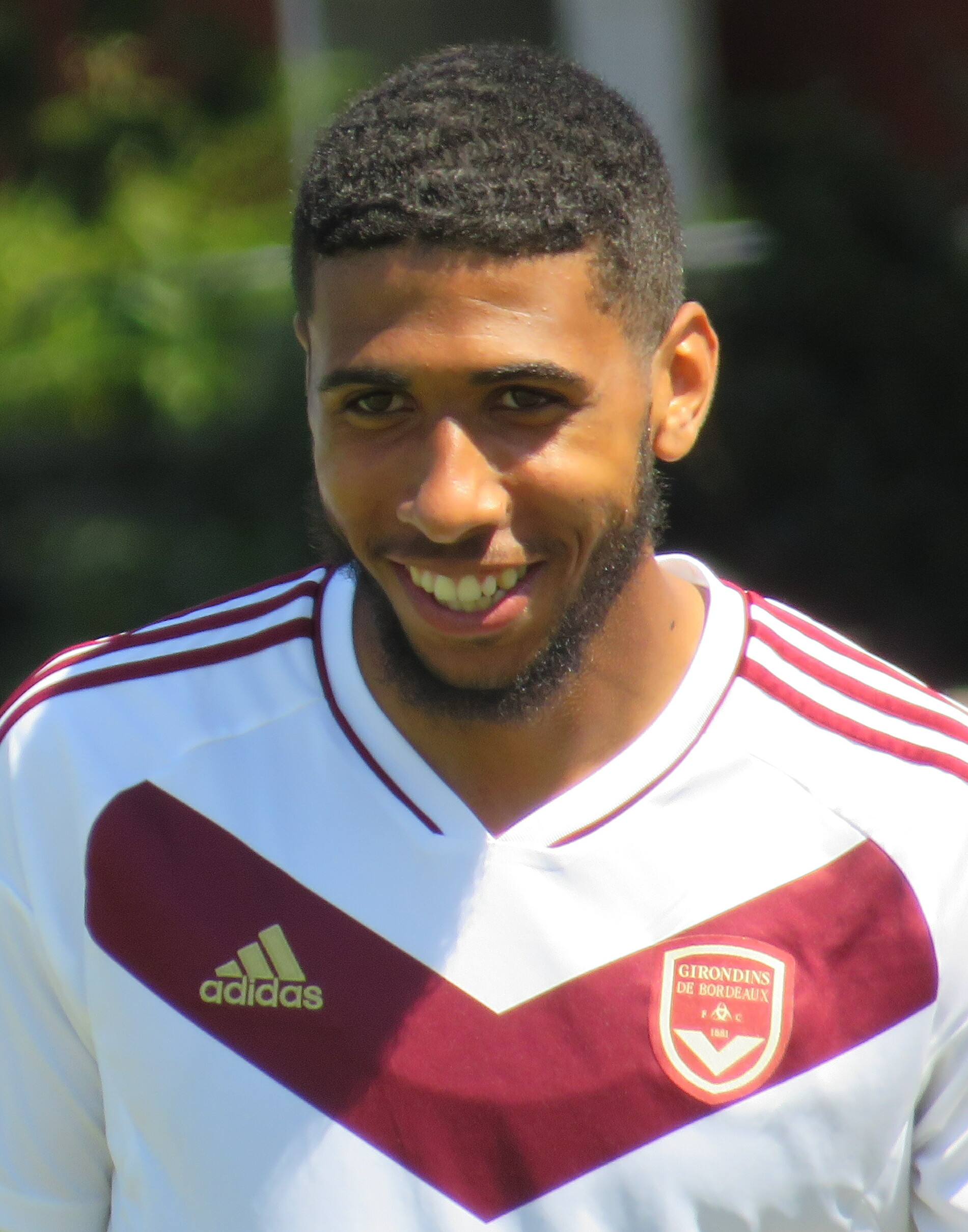

Personal information
- Date of birth: 18 October 2000 (age 26)
- Place of birth: Gonesse, France
- Height: 1.84 m (6 ft 0 in)
- Position: Midfielder

Team information
- Current team: Lahti
- Number: 18

Youth career
- 2009–2016: Saint-Nazaire AF
- 2016–2017: Niort

Senior career*
Years	Team	Apps	(Gls)
2017–2023	Niort II	39	(2)
2021–2023	Niort	26	(1)
2023–2024	Bordeaux	17	(0)
2024–2025	Amedspor	32	(2)
2026–	Lahti	26	(2)
- * Club domestic league appearances and goals as of 13 November 2026

Yohan Cassubie (born 18 October 2000) is a French professional footballer who plays as a midfielder for Finnish Veikkausliiga club Lahti.

== Club career ==
Cassubie is a youth product of Saint-Nazaire AF, before moving to Niort at the age of 16. On 23 July 2021, Cassubie signed his first professional contract with Niort for 2 years. He made his senior debut with Niort in a 0–0 Ligue 2 tie with Valenciennes on 24 July 2021.
