= Nacim El Hassani =

French footballer (born 2000)

Personal information
- Date of birth: 16 March 2000 (age 26)
- Place of birth: Avignon, France
- Height: 1.76 m (5 ft 9 in)
- Position: Midfielder

Team information
- Current team: Mâcon

Youth career
- 2012–2015: Monclar
- 2015–2017: Avignon
- 2017–2018: Nîmes

Senior career*
Years	Team	Apps	(Gls)
2018–2019	Nîmes II	0	(0)
2019–2020	Stade Beaucairois	1	(0)
2020–2021	Avignon		
2021–2022	SC Courthézon		
2022–2024	Niort II	45	(3)
2022–2024	Niort	9	(0)
2024–	Mâcon	6	(1)
- * Club domestic league appearances and goals as of 13 December 2024

Nacim El Hassani (born 16 March 2000) is a French professional footballer who plays as a midfielder for Championnat National 3 club Mâcon.

== Career ==
El Hassani is a product of the youth academy of Monclar, Avignon and Nîmes, beginning his career with their reserves in 2018. He had a short stint with Stade Beaucairois where he made his senior debut, returning to Avignon for a season before moving to SC Courthézon in 2021. In January 2022 he transferred to the reserves of Niort, and made his professional debut with Niort in a 1–0 Ligue 2 loss to AC Ajaccio on 22 March 2022. He was promoted to their senior team and signied a professional contract for 2 years on 5 May 2022.
