= Bilal Boutobba =

French footballer (born 1998)

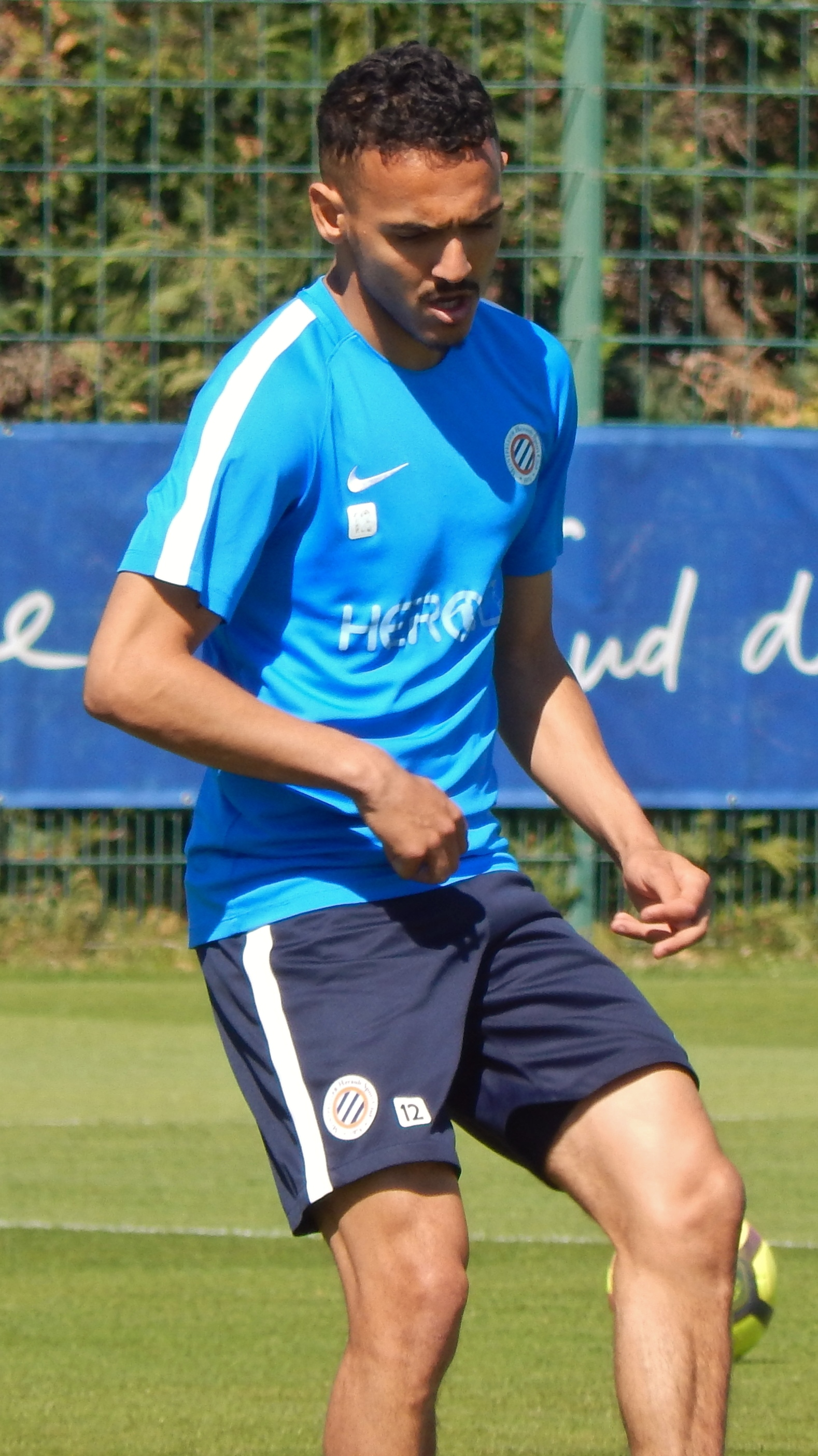
- Boutobba training with Montpellier in 2019

Personal information
- Date of birth: 29 August 1998 (age 28)
- Place of birth: Marseille, France
- Height: 1.73 m (5 ft 8 in)
- Position: Winger

Team information
- Current team: Eyüpspor
- Number: 98

Youth career
- 2004–2007: JS Arménienne St-Antoine
- 2007–2014: Marseille

Senior career*
Years	Team	Apps	(Gls)
2014–2016	Marseille B	25	(1)
2014–2016	Marseille	3	(0)
2016–2018	Sevilla B	33	(0)
2018–2020	Montpellier B	32	(7)
2019–2020	Montpellier	3	(0)
2020–2023	Niort	107	(21)
2023–2024	Clermont	27	(1)
2024–2025	Hatayspor	28	(11)
2025–2026	Al-Najma	28	(3)
2026–	Eyüpspor	8	(0)

International career
2014–2015	France U17	15	(2)
2015–2016	France U18	9	(3)
2016–2017	France U19	12	(4)
2017	France U20	1	(0)
- * Club domestic league appearances and goals as of 17 October 2026

Bilal Boutobba (born 29 August 1998) is a French professional footballer who plays as a right winger for Süper Lig club Eyüpspor in Turkey.

== Club career ==
=== Marseille ===
Born in Marseille and a youth product of Marseille, Boutobba made his league debut on 14 December 2014 in a 1–0 away defeat against Monaco at the Stade Louis II, replacing Mario Lemina for the last six minutes of the game. In doing so, he became the youngest ever player to play an official match for Marseille, at the age of 16 years, 3 months and 15 days. The record was previously held by his teammate Jérémie Porsan-Clémenté, who was aged 16 years and 8 months on his debut earlier in the season.

=== Sevilla ===
On 18 June 2016, Boutobba confirmed that he would not be renewing his contract with Marseille and would instead be joining La Liga side Sevilla on a free transfer. On 7 July he joined them on a four-year deal, initially assigned to their reserve side. Boutobba made his debut in Segunda División on 10 September, replacing David Carmona for the final seven minutes of a 1–0 loss at Lugo.

On 31 August 2018, Boutobba terminated his contract with Sevilla.

=== Montpellier ===
On 21 September 2018, Boutobba returned to Ligue 1 with Montpellier Montpellier on an undisclosed contract. He was assigned to their reserve team in Championnat National 3. He made his first-team debut on 24 February 2019, replacing Nicolas Cozza after an hour of a 4–2 home loss to Reims, and made one more appearance off the bench over the season.

=== Niort ===
In August 2020, out of contract at Montpellier, Boutobba signed a three-year deal at Niort in Ligue 2. He scored his first professional league goal on 7 November to open a 4–3 win at Sochaux that put his team in first place.

=== Al-Najma ===
On 27 August 2025, Boutobba joined Saudi Pro League side Al-Najma.

== International career ==
Boutobba was born in France and is of Algerian descent. Boutobba made his debut for France under-17 on 25 October 2014 in a European qualifier at Pafiako Stadium in Paphos, Cyprus, playing the entirety of a 3–0 win over Macedonia. In the opening match of the Elite Round on 20 March 2015, he netted the only goal in the first minute of the second half to defeat Israel. He was part of the French squad which won the finals in Bulgaria, netting in a 5–0 win over Scotland in the first group game.

Later in the year, he went with the team to the FIFA U-17 World Cup, forcing a James McGarry own goal and scoring in a 6–1 rout of New Zealand in the opening group game in Puerto Montt. Three days later, with a third-minute goal, he opened a 4–3 win over Paraguay. In the last 16, he scored in the penalty shootout as France were eliminated by Costa Rica after a goalless draw.

== Career statistics ==
As of matches played 12 May 2024

Appearances and goals by club, season and competition
Club	Season	League			National cup		Other		Total	
Club	Season	Division	Apps	Goals	Apps	Goals	Apps	Goals	Apps	Goals
Marseille B	2014–15	CFA 2	5	0	—		—		5	0
Marseille B	2015–16	CFA	20	1	—		—		20	1
Marseille B	Total		25	1	—		—		25	1
Marseille	2014–15	Ligue 1	3	0	0	0	0	0	3	0
Marseille	2015–16	Ligue 1	0	0	0	0	0	0	0	0
Marseille	Total		3	0	0	0	0	0	3	0
Sevilla B	2016–17	Segunda División	11	0	—		—		11	0
Sevilla B	2017–18	Segunda División	22	0	—		—		22	0
Sevilla B	Total		33	0	—		—		33	0
Montpellier B	2018–19	National 3	17	6	—		—		17	6
Montpellier B	2019–20	National 3	15	1	—		—		15	1
Montpellier B	Total		32	7	—		—		32	7
Montpellier	2018–19	Ligue 1	2	0	0	0	0	0	2	0
Montpellier	2019–20	Ligue 1	1	0	0	0	0	0	1	0
Montpellier	Total		3	0	0	0	0	0	3	0
Niort	2020–21	Ligue 2	35	3	1	0	1 (Note: Match played in the 2020–21 Ligue 2 relegation playoffs)	0	37	3
Niort	2021–22	Ligue 2	37	7	— (Note: Niort excluded from the 2021–22 Coupe de France)		—		37	7
Niort	2022–23	Ligue 2	35	11	4	0	—		39	11
Niort	Total		107	21	5	0	1	0	113	21
Clermont	2023–24	Ligue 1	27	1	2	0	—		29	1
Career total			205	29	7	0	1	0	213	29

== Honours ==
France

- UEFA European Under-17 Championship: 2015
