= Samuel Moutoussamy =

Association football player (born 1996)

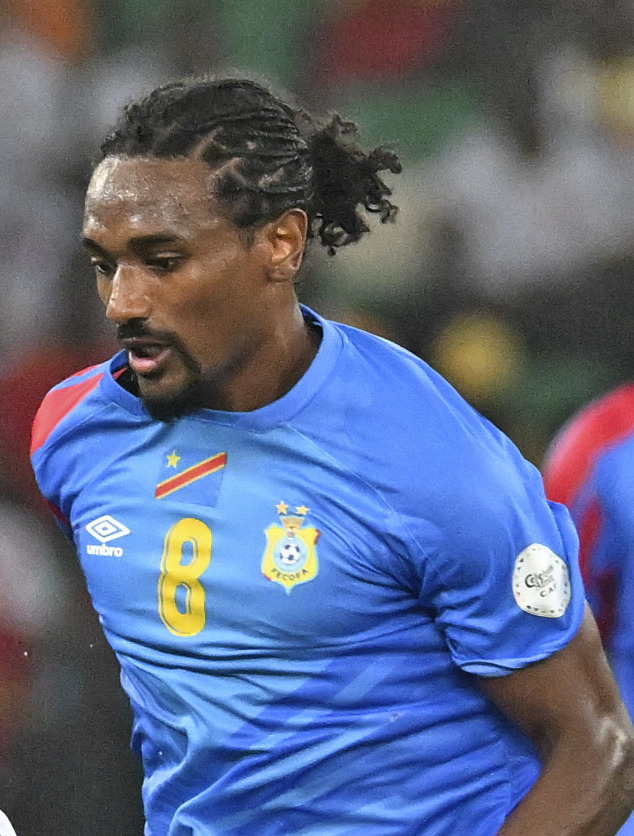
- Moutoussamy playing for DR Congo at the 2023 Africa Cup of Nations

Personal information
- Full name: Samuel Albert Alain Arcade Moutoussamy
- Date of birth: 12 August 1996 (age 30)
- Place of birth: Paris, France
- Height: 1.76 m (5 ft 9 in)
- Position: Defensive midfielder

Team information
- Current team: Atromitos
- Number: 8

Youth career
- 2003–2010: Meudon AS
- 2010–2011: Boulogne-Billancourt
- 2011: Montrouge FC 92
- 2011–2016: Lyon
- 2016–2017: Nantes

Senior career*
Years	Team	Apps	(Gls)
2014–2016	Lyon B	50	(2)
2016–2018	Nantes B	40	(5)
2017–2024	Nantes	144	(3)
2020–2021	→ Fortuna Sittard (loan)	14	(0)
2024–2025	Sivasspor	30	(0)
2025–	Atromitos	33	(5)

International career^{‡}
2019–	DR Congo	65	(2)
- * Club domestic league appearances and goals as of 19 September 2026 ‡ National team caps and goals as of 17:30, 12 November 2026 (UTC)

Samuel Albert Alain Arcade Moutoussamy (born 12 August 1996) is a professional footballer who plays as a defensive midfielder for Greek Super League club Atromitos. Born in France, he plays for the DR Congo national team.

== Early life ==
Moutoussamy was born on 12 August 1996 in Paris, France. His mother is Congolese and his father is Indo-Guadeloupean of Tamil origin; his surname comes from his father. The Indo-Guadeloupean community descends from indentured labourers brought from South India to the Caribbean during the second half of the 19th century. The name Moutoussamy is of Tamil origin, from muthu ('pearl') and sami ('lord' or 'god').

Moutoussamy began playing youth football with Meudon AS in 2003. He later joined Boulogne-Billancourt and Montrouge FC 92 before entering the Lyon academy in 2011, and moved to Nantes in 2016.

== Club career ==
=== Nantes ===
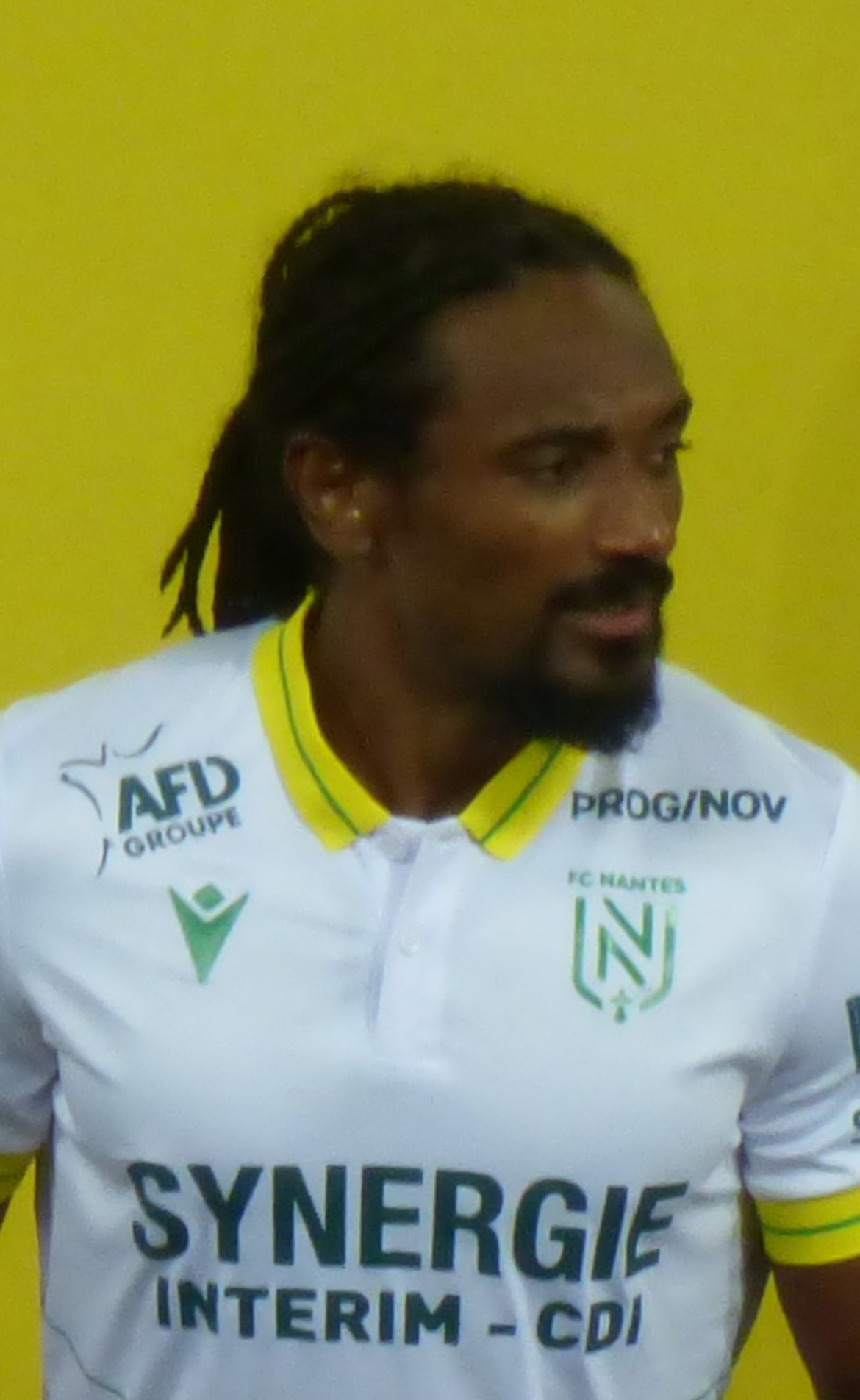
Moutoussamy with Nantes in 2023

Moutoussamy made his professional debut for Nantes in a 1–0 Ligue 1 loss to Marseille on 12 August 2017.

On 16 July 2019, Moutoussamy signed a two-year contract extension with Nantes, extending his stay at the club until 2024.

On 6 October 2020, he joined Fortuna Sittard on loan.

On 29 January 2023, in the 0–0 draw against Clermont Foot, he played his 100th game in Ligue 1 with Nantes. Three days later, the club rewarded him for the achievement.

At the end of July 2024, Nantes announced Moutoussamy's departure after eight years at the club. Over the course of his time there, he had gradually established himself as one of the team's senior figures.

=== Sivasspor ===
The DR Congo international joined Turkish club Sivasspor, with the transfer announced by the club on its social media accounts. The midfielder signed for the side that had finished seventh in the 2023–24 Süper Lig. At Sivasspor, he reunited with two former teammates from his time in France, Samba Camara, formerly of Le Havre, and Keita Baldé, formerly of Monaco.

== International career ==
Moutoussamy debuted for the DR Congo national team in a 1–1 friendly tie with Algeria on 10 October 2019.

On 27 December 2023, he was selected from the list of 24 Congolese players selected by Sébastien Desabre to compete in the 2023 Africa Cup of Nations.

On May 19, 2026, he was included in the 26-man squad selected by head coach Sébastien Desabre to represent the DR Congo at the 2026 FIFA World Cup.

== Personal life ==
Moutoussamy has spoken of his ties to the Democratic Republic of the Congo, where his mother's family lives in Kinshasa and which he has visited several times, and of listening to Congolese musicians such as Fally Ipupa and Koffi Olomidé.

== Career statistics ==
=== Club ===
As of 19 September 2026

Appearances and goals by club, season and competition
Club	Season	League			National cup (Note: Includes Coupe de France, KNVB Cup, Turkish Cup and Greek Cup)		Coupe de la Ligue		Continental		Other		Total	
Club	Season	Division	Apps	Goals	Apps	Goals	Apps	Goals	Apps	Goals	Apps	Goals	Apps	Goals
Lyon B	2014–15	Championnat National 2	17	1	—		—		—		—		17	1
Lyon B	2015–16	Championnat National 2	27	1	—		—		—		—		27	1
Lyon B	Total		44	2	0	0	0	0	0	0	0	0	44	2
Nantes B	2016–17	Championnat National 2	30	3	—		—		—		—		30	3
Nantes B	2017–18	Championnat National 3	10	2	—		—		—		—		10	2
Nantes B	Total		40	5	0	0	0	0	0	0	0	0	40	5
Nantes	2017–18	Ligue 1	7	0	0	0	0	0	—		—		7	0
Nantes	2018–19	Ligue 1	28	2	3	0	0	0	—		—		31	2
Nantes	2019–20	Ligue 1	17	0	1	0	2	0	—		—		20	0
Nantes	2020–21	Ligue 1	1	0	—		—		—		—		1	0
Nantes	2021–22	Ligue 1	30	0	4	1	—		—		—		34	1
Nantes	2022–23	Ligue 1	35	0	6	0	—		8 (Note: Appearance(s) in UEFA Europa League)	0	1 (Note: Appearance(s) in Trophée des Champions)	0	50	0
Nantes	2023–24	Ligue 1	26	1	0	0	—		—		—		26	1
Nantes	Total		144	3	14	1	2	0	8	0	1	0	169	4
Fortuna Sittard (loan)	2020–21	Eredivisie	14	0	1	0	—		—		—		15	0
Sivasspor	2024–25	Süper Lig	30	0	3	0	—		—		—		33	0
Sivasspor	2025–26	1. Lig	4	0	—		—		—		—		26	1
Sivasspor	Total		34	0	3	0	0	0	0	0	0	0	37	0
Atromitos	2025–26	Super League Greece	28	3	3	0	—		—		—		32	3
Atromitos	2026–27	Super League Greece	5	2	3	0	—		—		—		8	2
Atromitos	Total		33	5	6	0	—		—		—		39	5
Career total			310	15	24	1	2	0	8	0	1	0	345	16

=== International ===
As of match played 12 November 2026

Appearances and goals by national team and year
National team	Year	Apps	Goals
DR Congo	2019	3	0
DR Congo	2020	4	0
DR Congo	2021	7	0
DR Congo	2022	4	0
DR Congo	2023	8	0
DR Congo	2024	16	0
DR Congo	2025	12	0
DR Congo	2026	11	2
Total		65	2

Scores and results list DR Congo's goal tally first, score column indicates score after each Moutoussamy goal.

List of international goals scored by Samuel Moutoussamy
No.	Date	Venue	Opponent	Score	Result	Competition
1	28 September 2026	National Sports Stadium, Harare, Zimbabwe	Zimbabwe	2–0	2–1	2027 Africa Cup of Nations qualification
2	12 November 2026	Stade des Martyrs, Kinshasa, DR Congo	Sierra Leone	2–0	3–1	2027 Africa Cup of Nations qualification

== Honours ==
Nantes

- Coupe de France: 2021–22
