= Sidi Cissé =

French footballer (born 2003)

Personal information
- Full name: Sidi Ibrahim Cissé
- Date of birth: 6 February 2003 (age 23)
- Place of birth: Colombes, France
- Height: 1.74 m (5 ft 9 in)
- Position: Winger

Team information
- Current team: Nancy
- Number: 11

Youth career
- 2014–2021: Niort

Senior career*
Years	Team	Apps	(Gls)
2020–2024	Niort II	45	(9)
2021–2024	Niort	24	(0)
2024–	Nancy	18	(1)
2025–2026	→ Bourg-Péronnas (loan)	17	(2)
- * Club domestic league appearances and goals as of 23 June 2026

Sidi Ibrahim Cissé (born 6 February 2003) is a French professional footballer who plays as a winger for Ligue 2 club Nancy.

== Career ==
On 10 June 2021, Cissé signed his first professional contract with Niort. He made his senior debut with Niort in a 1–0 Ligue 2 tie with Caen on 31 July 2021.

== Honours ==
Nancy

- Championnat National: 2024–25
