= Alban Lafont =

Footballer (born 1999)

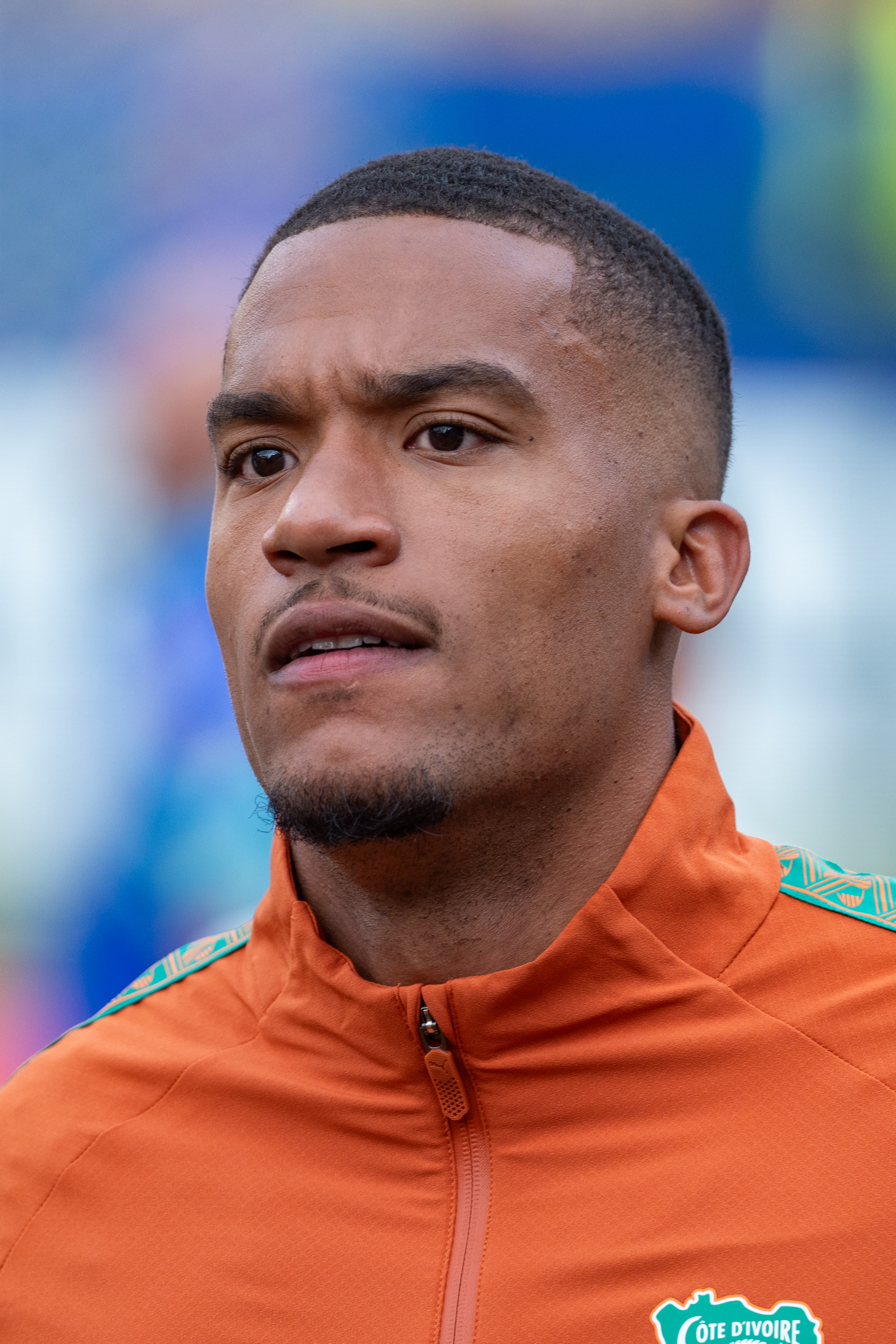
- Lafont with Ivory Coast in 2026

Personal information
- Full name: Alban-Marc Lafont
- Date of birth: 23 January 1999 (age 27)
- Place of birth: Ouagadougou, Burkina Faso
- Height: 1.96 m (6 ft 5 in)
- Position: Goalkeeper

Team information
- Current team: Amedspor
- Number: 40

Youth career
- 2008–2014: AS Lattoise
- 2014–2015: Toulouse

Senior career*
Years	Team	Apps	(Gls)
2015–2018	Toulouse	98	(0)
2018–2021	Fiorentina	34	(0)
2019–2021	→ Nantes (loan)	65	(0)
2021–2026	Nantes	115	(0)
2025	Nantes B	6	(0)
2025–2026	→ Panathinaikos (loan)	22	(0)
2026–	Amedspor	6	(0)

International career^{‡}
2015	France U16	5	(0)
2015	France U17	2	(0)
2016	France U18	4	(0)
2017–2018	France U19	5	(0)
2017–2019	France U20	7	(0)
2019–2021	France U21	13	(0)
2025–	Ivory Coast	4	(0)
- * Club domestic league appearances and goals as of 19:00, 20 September 2026 (UTC) ‡ National team caps and goals as of 23:51, 31 March 2026 (UTC)

Alban-Marc Lafont (born 23 January 1999) is a professional footballer who plays as goalkeeper for Turkish Süper Lig club Amedspor. Born in Burkina Faso and raised in France, he plays for the Ivory Coast national team.

Having progressed through the academy of AS Lattoise, Lafont signed for Toulouse in 2014 where he became the youngest goalkeeper ever to play in Ligue 1 upon making his debut the following year. He went on to make over 100 appearances for the club across all competitions before joining Fiorentina in 2018. In 2019, he returned to France in a loan deal to Nantes; the deal was made permanent in 2021.

== Early life ==
Lafont was born in Ouagadougou, the capital of Burkina Faso, to a French father and Burkinabé Dyula mother. His parents separated when he was nine years old and Lafont moved to France to live with his father in Herault. His mother remained in Burkina Faso, where she later became a Member of Parliament for the People's Movement for Progress in the Burkina Faso National Assembly. Lafont comes from a sporting family. His maternal grandfather played football for ten years and later served as president of Ouagadougou Shooting Star while his mother was a member of the national handball team. His father also played tennis.

== Club career ==
=== Toulouse ===
Lafont started his career at amateur side AS Lattoise where he initially began playing as an attacking midfielder, before converting to a goalkeeper. He spent six years with Lattoise before signing with Ligue 1 side Toulouse in 2014.

==== 2015–16 season ====
Lafont spent little more than a year in the academy at Toulouse before club manager Dominique Arribagé handed him his Ligue 1 debut on 28 November 2015 against OGC Nice. Upon doing so, he became the youngest ever goalkeeper to play in Ligue 1 at the age of 16 years and 310 days, surpassing the record previously held by Mickaël Landreau. Having replaced Ali Ahamada and Mauro Goicoechea as Toulouse's starting goalkeeper, Lafont kept clean sheets in his first two competitive fixtures before finally conceding in a 3–2 loss against Lorient on 5 December 2015. In January 2016, Lafont was named as the 34th best U-20 player in the world by Italian publication La Gazzetta dello Sport and featured as one of only two goalkeepers on the list alongside AC Milan's Gianluigi Donnarumma. Having been 10 points adrift of safety at the time of Lafont's introduction into the first team, Toulouse managed to avoid relegation on the final day of the season, thanks in part to the eight clean sheets he kept in his 24 appearances for the campaign. He was rewarded for his form on 30 June 2016 when he signed a new contract with Toulouse, extending his stay with the club until 2020.

==== 2016–17 season ====
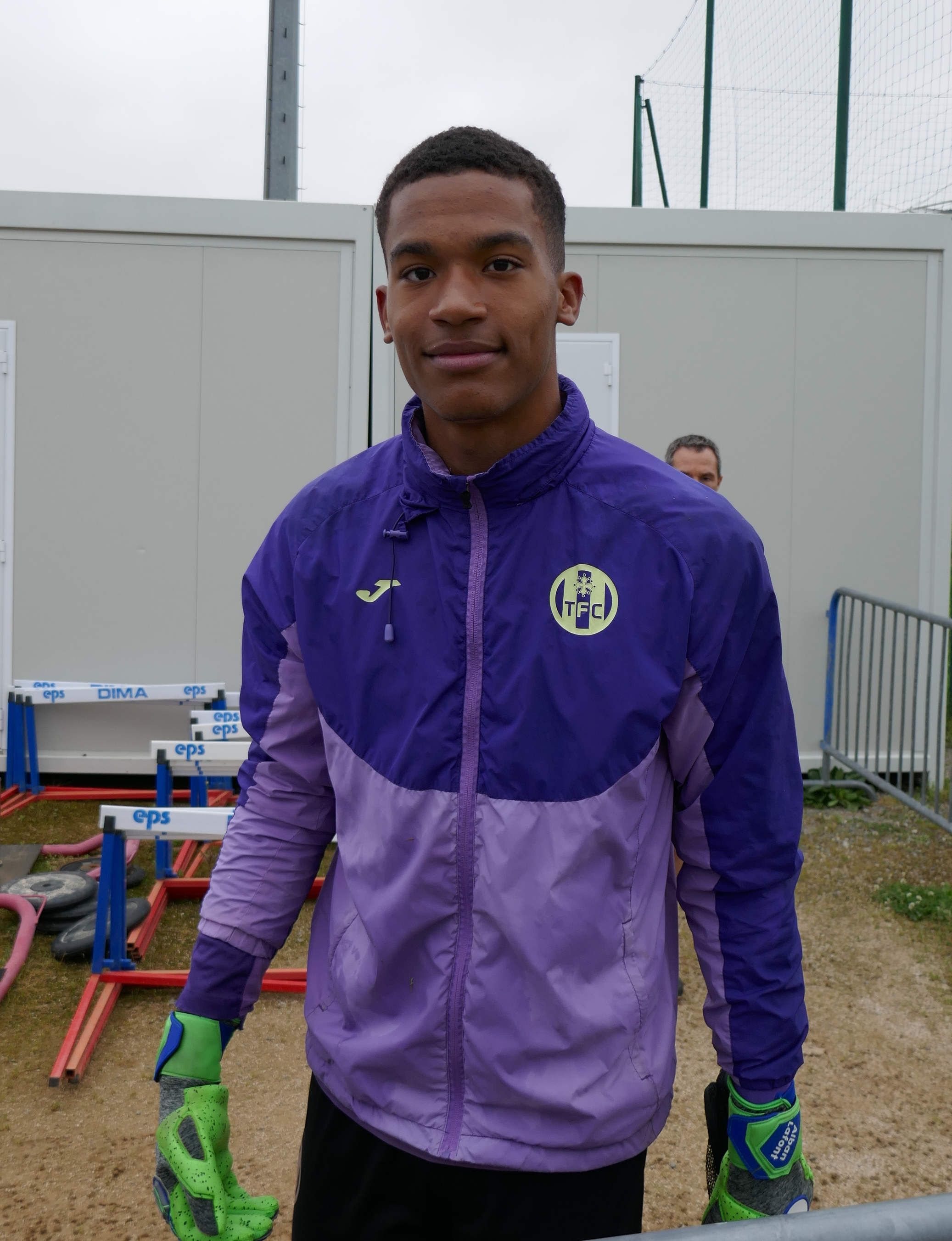
Lafont became the youngest goalkeeper to play in Ligue 1 upon making his debut for Toulouse in 2015.

Lafont retained the number one spot for Toulouse in the following season and started the campaign by keeping a clean sheet against Marseille on the opening weekend. On 22 October he was named as the man of the match for his performance in Toulouse's 0–0 draw with Angers, with his form in goal earning him his fourth clean sheet in only his tenth league appearance for the campaign. Lafont's previous three clean sheets had come against esteemed opposition in the form of Marseille, Saint-Étienne and defending champions, Paris Saint-Germain. Four days later, Lafont made his Coupe de la Ligue debut and kept another clean sheet in a 1–0 win over Ligue 2 side Auxerre. He then made his first ever appearance in the Coupe de France on 8 January 2017, starting in a 2–1 extra-time defeat to Marseille. The following month, he became the youngest goalkeeper in 30 years to reach 50 Ligue 1 appearances, achieving the milestone in a 0–0 draw with PSG. He ended the campaign with 38 appearances to his name across all competitions, and having kept 11 clean sheets, as Toulouse ended the Ligue 1 season in 13th position.

==== 2017–18 season ====
In February 2018, having continued to impress in goal for Toulouse, Lafont was named by the CIES Football Observatory as the world's second-most promising footballer under the age of 20. Gianluigi Donnarumma was the only player rated higher than him while countryman and Golden Boy winner Kylian Mbappé was ranked third. He made his 100th appearance for the club on 29 April 2018, starting in a 2–1 league defeat to Rennes. He kept 12 clean sheets for the season and featured in Toulouse's play-off victory over Ajaccio to help the club avoid relegation.

=== Fiorentina ===
On 2 July 2018, Lafont signed a five-year deal with Italian side Fiorentina for a reported fee €7 million plus bonuses. His debut followed on 26 August when he started in a 6–1 win over ChievoVerona on the day of Fiorentina's 92nd anniversary. He ultimately made 38 appearances for the season but the campaign was one of indifference, with Lafont's impressive repertoire of saves matched by a string of high-profile errors.

=== Nantes ===
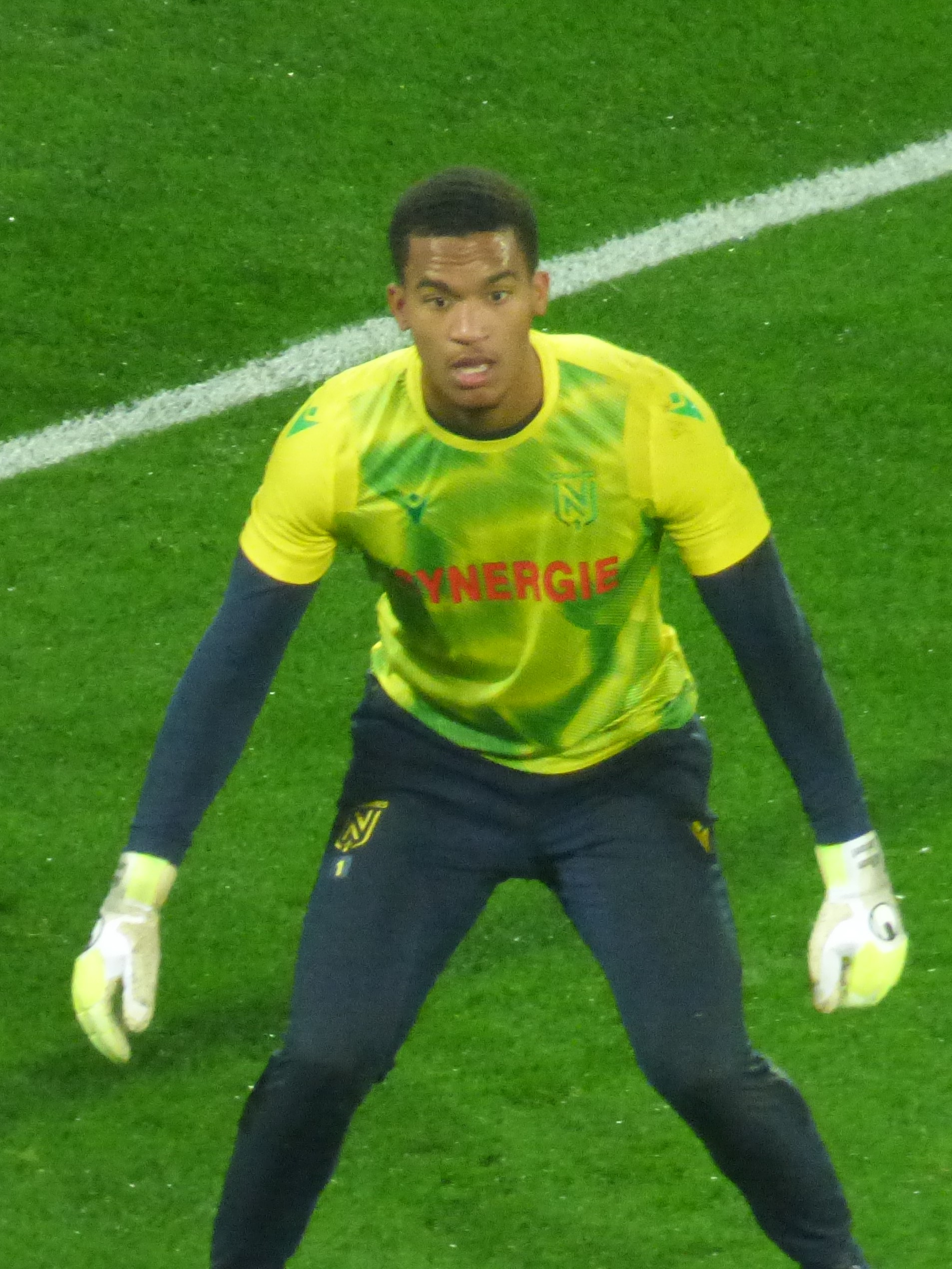
Lafont with Nantes in 2020

On 29 June 2019, having lost his place to Bartłomiej Drągowski, Lafont returned to France where he joined Nantes on a two-season-long loan as a replacement for the departing Ciprian Tătărușanu. Nantes also secured an option to sign Lafont permanently for a €7 million transfer fee.

On 26 May 2021, Nantes made Lafont's deal a permanent one, triggering his €7 million option to buy clause.

=== Amedspor ===
On 22 July 2026, Lafont signed a one-season contract with Amedspor in Turkey.Lafont said he joined Amedspor because he was attracted by the club's ambitious project and wanted to establish himself once again as an undisputed first-choice goalkeeper after leaving Nantes.

== International career ==
=== France ===
Lafont has represented France at various youth levels. He made six appearances for the France U16 team and captained the side on three occasions. He then made his debut for France U17 on 20 October 2015 against Northern Ireland, keeping a clean sheet in the process. Lafont was, however, not selected for France's 2016 European Under-17 Championship squad after Toulouse lobbied for him to remain with the club for their last two games of the season to aid their relegation battle.

In September 2016, Lafont was named in the 20-man France U18 squad by manager Bernard Diomède for the 2016 Limoges Tournament. He was an ever-present as France ended the tournament on top of the standings having won 2 out of their 3 matches and drawn the other. He was promoted to the U20 side the following year and made his debut against England on 25 March. In May the same year, he was named in the France squad for the 2017 FIFA U-20 World Cup in South Korea. Throughout the tournament, he alternated with Paul Bernardoni as France's starting 'keeper before the nation was eliminated by Italy in the Round of 16.

On 19 September 2022, Lafont received his first France national team call-up for two UEFA Nations League matches, replacing the injured Hugo Lloris.

=== Ivory Coast ===
Eligible to represent the Ivory Coast national team through his maternal grandfather who was an Ivorian citizen, Lafont was called up to the national team in August 2025.

On 3 September 2025, Lafont's request to change sports citizenship from French to Ivorian was approved by FIFA.

On 9 December, Lafont was included in the Ivory Coast's 26-man squad for the 2025 Africa Cup of Nations.

On May 15, 2026, Lafont was integrated by Ivory Coast coach Emerse Faé in his list of 26 players in order to participate in the 2026 World Cup.

== Personal life ==
In January 2016, relatives of Lafont were among the 30 people killed in the Ouagadougou attacks when a group of gunmen opened fire in a Cappuccino restaurant.

On 25 September 2016, Lafont became the youngest ever footballer to be invited as a guest on French football programme Téléfoot.

== Career statistics ==
=== Club ===
As of match played 8 November 2026

Appearances and goals by club, season and competition
Club	Season	League			National cup (Note: Includes Coupe de France, Coppa Italia, Greek Football Cup)		League cup (Note: Includes Coupe de la Ligue)		Europe		Other		Total	
Club	Season	Division	Apps	Goals	Apps	Goals	Apps	Goals	Apps	Goals	Apps	Goals	Apps	Goals
Toulouse	2015–16	Ligue 1	24	0	0	0	0	0	—		—		24	0
Toulouse	2016–17	Ligue 1	36	0	1	0	1	0	—		—		38	0
Toulouse	2017–18	Ligue 1	38	0	1	0	3	0	—		2 (Note: Appearances in Ligue 1 relegation play-offs)	0	44	0
Toulouse	Total		98	0	2	0	4	0	—		2	0	106	0
Fiorentina	2018–19	Serie A	34	0	4	0	—		—		—		38	0
Nantes (loan)	2019–20	Ligue 1	27	0	2	0	0	0	—		—		29	0
Nantes (loan)	2020–21	Ligue 1	38	0	0	0	—		—		2	0	40	0
Nantes (loan)	Total		65	0	2	0	—		—		2	0	69	0
Nantes	2021–22	Ligue 1	38	0	1	0	—		—		—		39	0
Nantes	2022–23	Ligue 1	37	0	2	0	—		8 (Note: Appearances in UEFA Europa League)	0	1 (Note: Appearance in Trophée des Champions)	0	48	0
Nantes	2023–24	Ligue 1	28	0	2	0	—		—		—		30	0
Nantes	2024–25	Ligue 1	12	0	0	0	—		—		—		12	0
Nantes	Total		115	0	5	0	—		8	0	1	0	129	0
Nantes B	2024–25	Championnat National 3	6	0	—		—		—		—		6	0
Panathinaikos (loan)	2025–26	Super League Greece	22	0	5	0	—		10	0	—		37	0
Amedspor	2026–27	Süper Lig	11	0	0	0	—		—		—		11	0
Career total			351	0	18	0	4	0	18	0	5	0	396	0

=== International ===
As of match played 31 March 2026

Appearances and goals by national team and year
National team	Year	Apps	Goals
Ivory Coast	2025	3	0
Ivory Coast	2026	1	0
Total		4	0

== Honours ==
Nantes

- Coupe de France: 2021–22
