= Challenge Emiliano Sala =

Friendly football tournament

- Organiser(s): Un jour meilleur
- Founded: 2021
- Teams: 4
- Current champions: Bordeaux (1st title)
- Most championships: Bordeaux (1 title)
- Website: challenge-emilianosala.fr, archived

The Challenge Emiliano Sala was a friendly football competition played in honour of Argentine footballer Emiliano Sala, who died on 21 January 2019 in a plane crash. Originally scheduled to be an annual event but, has not taken place since the first edition which in 2021. The participating clubs were Girondins de Bordeaux, Stade Malherbe Caen, FC Nantes, and Chamois Niortais, all former clubs of Sala. It took place at the Stade de la Source in Orléans, which is the home stadium of US Orléans, another club for which Sala played.

== History ==
The Challenge Emiliano Sala is organized by the Un jour meilleur association founded by former US Orléans defender Cédric Cambon with the support of the city of Orléans. The inspiration for the creation of the competition came from Thomas Renault, sports assistant in the town of Orléans and former US Orléans goalkeeper who played alongside Emiliano Sala at USO.

For each ticket sold to matches of the competition, one euro is donated to the Emiliano Sala solidarity fund, started by Cardiff City, who had signed him from Nantes shortly before his death. This fund has the objective of collecting €2.25 million to create a new stadium bearing Sala's name in his native town of Progreso in Argentina. The rest of each ticket's price is given to the Un jour meilleur association. A charity gala and an auction of football kits are also organized during the three days of the tournament in order to raise funds.

The first edition of the tournament took place from 16 to 18 July 2021 at the Stade de la Source in Orléans. The first semi-final was played between Nantes and Caen, and the second semi-final was played between Niort and Bordeaux. Caen eliminated Nantes with a 1–0 win thanks to a goal from Yoann Court, and Bordeaux won against Niort in a penalty shoot-out (5–3) after a 1–1 draw in which Jimmy Briand opened the scoring for Les Girondins and Guy Kilama equalized for Les Chamois. On 18 July, Nantes and Niort played in the third place playoff the Challenge Emiliano Sala. Niort won the match, securing third place in the competition thanks to a goal from Mathis Ansar. The final of the first edition of the tournament was therefore played between Caen and Bordeaux, a game in which Bordeaux was victorious by a score of 2–1. Caen opened the scoring with a goal from Vladislav Molchan, but goals from Rémi Oudin and Sékou Mara secured the win for FCGB. Bordeaux therefore won the first edition of the Challenge Emiliano Sala.

The second edition of the Challenge Emiliano Sala was scheduled to take place 16–17 July 2022, with the participating teams being Bordeaux, Caen, Nantes, and Orléans. However, the competition was cancelled after Nantes pulled out on 6 July. The club's head coach, Antoine Kombouaré, explained the decision by saying, "Between the demotion of Bordeaux [to the Championnat National] and this limited workforce, I had to make this decision." In 2023, the Challenge Emiliano Sala was once again cancelled, in part due to the Stade de la Source's pitch needing to be maintained for the new season.

== Past winners ==
Past winners of the Challenge Emiliano Sala
Edition	Location	Final			Third place playoff		
Edition	Location	Champion	Score	Runner-up	Third	Score	Fourth
2021	Stade de la Source, Orléans	Bordeaux	2–1	Caen	Niort	1–0	Nantes
