= 2022–23 Grenoble Foot 38 season =

Grenoble Foot 38
2022–23 season
- Owner: Stéphane Rosnoblet
- Chairman: Stéphane Rosnoblet
- Manager: Vincent Hognon
- Stadium: Stade des Alpes
- Ligue 2: 10th
- Coupe de France: Quarter-finals
- Top goalscorer: League: Matthias Phaëton (9); All: Matthias Phaëton (10)
Home colours	Away colours	Third colours

The 2022–23 season was the 112th in the history of Grenoble Foot 38 and their fourth consecutive season in the second division. The club participated in Ligue 2 and the Coupe de France.

== Players ==
As of 23 January 2023

Note: Flags indicate national team as defined under FIFA eligibility rules; some limited exceptions apply. Players may hold more than one non-FIFA nationality.

No.	Pos.	Nation	Player
1	GK	FRA	Brice Maubleu (captain)
2	FW	GAM	Abdoulie Sanyang
3	DF	NED	Bart Straalman
4	MF	FRA	Manuel Perez
5	DF	FRA	Adrien Monfray
6	MF	FRA	Franck-Yves Bambock
7	MF	GEO	Giorgi Kokhreidze
8	MF	FRA	Jessy Bénet
10	MF	FRA	Florian Michel
11	FW	FRA	Amine Sbaï
12	DF	FRA	Jordy Gaspar
14	DF	GLP	Loïc Nestor
15	MF	NCL	Jekob Jeno
16	GK	FRA	Paul Bourdelle
17	DF	FRA	Loris Néry
18	MF	BFA	Bachirou Yaméogo

No.	Pos.	Nation	Player
19	FW	GLP	Matthias Phaëton
20	DF	AUS	Alex Gersbach
21	DF	FRA	Allan Tchaptchet
23	MF	FRA	Axel Ngando
25	MF	KOS	Orges Bunjaku
27	FW	SEN	Olivier Boissy
28	FW	SEN	Pape Meïssa Ba
29	DF	FRA	Gaëtan Paquiez
30	GK	FRA	Esteban Salles
66	DF	SEN	Mamadou Diarra
70	MF	GAM	Saikou Touray
77	DF	SEN	Arial Mendy
80	FW	FRA	Joris Correa
97	FW	FRA	Jordan Tell
—	GK	SEN	Mamadou Diop

=== Out on loan ===
Note: Flags indicate national team as defined under FIFA eligibility rules; some limited exceptions apply. Players may hold more than one non-FIFA nationality.

No.	Pos.	Nation	Player
—	DF	FRA	Jules Sylvestre-Brac (on loan to Stade Nyonnais)

== Pre-season and friendlies ==
Win Draw Loss

2 July 2022 Friendly	Auxerre (France)	1–2	(France) Grenoble	Saint-Priest
17:00 CEST (UTC+2)	Ben Fredj 60'		Ba 3'; Inikurogha 64'	Stadium: Stade Jacques Joly

9 July 2022 Friendly	Grenoble (France)	1–0	(France) Clermont	Le Chambon-sur-Lignon
17:00 CEST (UTC+2)	Correa 77' (pen.)			Stadium: Stade Municipal

15 July 2022 Friendly	Grenoble (France)	1–1	(France) Saint-Étienne	Le Chambon-sur-Lignon
18:00 CEST (UTC+2)	Tell 55'		Krasso 44'	Stadium: Stade Municipal

20 July 2022 Friendly	Villefranche (France)	2–0	(France) Grenoble	Villefranche-sur-Saône
18:00 CEST (UTC+2)	M'Buyi 20'; Sergio 80' (pen.)		Ba (penalty missed) 87'	Stadium: Stade Armand Chouffet

23 July 2022 Friendly	Grenoble (France)	2–0	(France) Red Star	Saint-Marcellin
17:00 CEST (UTC+2)	Ba 29'; Nestor 90'			Stadium: Stade de la Saulaie

9 December 2022 Friendly	Saint-Étienne (France)	3–1	(France) Grenoble	L'Étrat
17:00 CET (UTC+1)	Saban 26'; Krasso 75' (pen.); Ghoulam 83'		Correa 31'	Stadium: Stade Aimé Jacquet

17 December 2022 Friendly	Grenoble (France)	0–2	(France) Annecy	Saint-Marcellin
14:30 CET (UTC+1)		Report	Pajot 47'; Sahi 55'	Stadium: Stade de la Saulaie

== Competitions ==
=== Overall record ===
Competition	First match	Last match	Starting round	Final position	Record							
Competition	First match	Last match	Starting round	Final position	Pld	W	D	L	GF	GA	GD	Win %
Ligue 2	30 July 2022	2 June 2023	Matchday 1	10th	38	14	9	15	33	36	−3	36.84
Coupe de France	29 October 2022	28 February 2023	Seventh round	Quarter-finals	5	4	0	1	9	3	+6	80.00
Total					43	18	9	16	42	39	+3	41.86

Source: Soccerway

=== Ligue 2 ===
==== League table ====
Pos	Team	Pld	W	D	L	GF	GA	GD	Pts	Promotion or Relegation
8	Saint-Étienne	38	15	11	12	63	57	+6	53 (Note: Saint-Étienne were deducted three points for a pitch invasion during their relegation play-off the previous season.)	
9	Sochaux (D, R)	38	15	7	16	54	41	+13	52	Relegation to Championnat National
10	Grenoble	38	14	9	15	33	36	−3	51	
11	Quevilly-Rouen	38	12	14	12	47	49	−2	50	
12	Amiens	38	13	8	17	40	52	−12	47	

Source: Ligue 2
Rules for classification: 1) Points; 2) Goal difference; 3) Number of goals scored; 4) Head-to-head goal difference; 5) Fair play points
(D) Disqualified; (R) Relegated

==== Results summary ====
Overall								Home						Away					
Pld	W	D	L	GF	GA	GD	Pts	W	D	L	GF	GA	GD	W	D	L	GF	GA	GD
38	14	9	15	33	36	−3	51	9	5	5	19	16	+3	5	4	10	14	20	−6

Source: Ligue 2

==== Results by round ====
Round	1	2	3	4	5	6	7	8	9	10	11	12	13	14	15	16	17	18	19	20	21	22
Ground	A	H	A	H	A	H	A	H	H	A	H	A	H	A	H	A	H	A	A	H	H	A
Result	D	W	L	D	D	W	L	L	W	D	W	W	W	W	D	L	L	D	W	L	W	
Position	13	7	12	13	15	10	10	13	9	11	8	6	5	3	4	4	5	6	5	7	7	

Source: Ligue 2
A = Away; H = Home; W = Win; D = Draw; L = Loss

==== Matches ====
The league fixtures were announced on 17 June 2022.

30 July 2022 1	Le Havre	0–0	Grenoble	Le Havre
19:00 CEST (UTC+2)		Report		Stadium: Stade Océane; Attendance: 5,388; Referee: Pierre Legat

6 August 2022 2	Grenoble	1–0	Sochaux	Grenoble
19:00 CEST (UTC+2)	Sanyang 55'	Report		Stadium: Stade des Alpes; Attendance: 4,589; Referee: Romain Lissorgue

13 August 2022 3	Bastia	3–0	Grenoble	Furiani
19:00 CEST (UTC+2)	Magri 8'; Salles-Lamonge 24'; Santelli 85'	Report		Stadium: Stade Armand Cesari; Attendance: 11,415; Referee: Eric Wattellier

22 August 2022 4	Grenoble	0–0	Bordeaux	Grenoble
20:45 CEST (UTC+2)		Report		Stadium: Stade des Alpes; Attendance: 8,092; Referee: Mikael Lesage

27 August 2022 5	Annecy	0–0	Grenoble	Annecy
19:00 CEST (UTC+2)		Report		Stadium: Parc des Sports; Attendance: 7,618; Referee: Benjamin Lepaysant

30 August 2022 6	Grenoble	3–2	Nîmes	Grenoble
20:45 CEST (UTC+2)	Sanyang 19'; Correa 61'; Ba 81'	Report	Tchokounté 76', 90+1' (pen.)	Stadium: Stade des Alpes; Attendance: 4,850; Referee: Jérôme Brisard

2 September 2022 7	Amiens	1–0	Grenoble	Amiens
20:45 CEST (UTC+2)	Arokodare 69' (pen.)	Report		Stadium: Stade de la Licorne; Attendance: 5,966; Referee: Azzedine Souifi

10 September 2022 8	Grenoble	0–2	Paris FC	Grenoble
19:00 CEST (UTC+2)	Bambock (yellow card) 54'; Sanyang 77'; Nestor (yellow card) 87'; Gersbach (yellow card) 87'	Report	Guilavogui 60'; Chahiri 88' (pen.); Dabila (yellow card) 90+3'	Stadium: Stade des Alpes; Attendance: 5,387; Referee: Abdelatif Kherradji

17 September 2022 9	Grenoble	1–0	Caen	Grenoble
19:00 CEST (UTC+2)	Paquiez (yellow card) 22' (yellow-red card) 37'; Ba (yellow card) 45+1'; Tell 66'	Report	Thomas (yellow card) 71'	Stadium: Stade des Alpes; Attendance: 4,446; Referee: Faouzi Benchabane

1 October 2022 10	Saint-Étienne	2–2	Grenoble	Saint-Étienne
15:00 CET (UTC+1)	Monconduit (yellow card) 34'; Chambost 58'; Krasso (yellow card) 60'; Briançon 65'	Report	Tell 2', (yellow card) 38'; Touray (yellow card) 32'; Phaëton 78'	Stadium: Stade Geoffroy-Guichard; Attendance: 22,959; Referee: Gaël Angoula

8 October 2022 11	Grenoble	3–2	Laval	Grenoble
19:00 CEST (UTC+2)	Sanyang 3', 10'; Gaspar 6'	Report	Maggiotti 26' (pen.); Seidou 44'; Baudry (yellow card) 78'	Stadium: Stade des Alpes; Attendance: 4,449; Referee: Azzédine Souifi

15 October 2022 12	Niort	0–3	Grenoble	Niort
19:00 CEST (UTC+2)	Kilama (red card) 9'; Benchamma (yellow card) 65'; Sagna (yellow card) 74'; Kaboré (yellow card) 84'	Report	Phaëton 19', 77'; Bambock (yellow card) 37'; Ba 84'	Stadium: Stade René Gaillard; Attendance: 1,755; Referee: Olivier Thual

22 October 2022 13	Grenoble	1–0	Valenciennes	Grenoble
19:00 CEST (UTC+2)	Diarra (yellow card) 34'; Gaspar (yellow card) 71'; Tchaptchet 85'	Report		Stadium: Stade des Alpes; Attendance: 5,074; Referee: Florent Batta

5 November 2022 14	Rodez	0–1	Grenoble	Rodez
19:00 CEST (UTC+2)		Report	Diarra 61', (yellow card) 84'; Tell (yellow card) 81'; Paquiez (yellow card) 87'	Stadium: Stade Paul-Lignon; Attendance: 1,515; Referee: Romain Lissorgue

12 November 2022 15	Grenoble	0–0	Dijon	Grenoble
19:00 CEST (UTC+2)	Touray (yellow card) 24'	Report	Ndong (yellow card) 32'; Traoré (yellow card) 73'	Stadium: Stade des Alpes; Attendance: 6,573; Referee: Antoine Valnet

26 December 2022 16	Quevilly-Rouen	2–0	Grenoble	Le Petit-Quevilly
19:00 CET (UTC+1)	Sidibé (yellow card) 31'; Cissé 65'; Mafouta 69'	Report	Tchaptchet (yellow card) 61'; Gersbach (yellow card) 71'	Stadium: Stade Robert Diochon; Attendance: 3,000; Referee: Azzédine Souifi

30 December 2022 17	Grenoble	0–1	Metz	Grenoble
21:00 CEST (UTC+2)	Touray (yellow card) 63'	Report	Candé 52'	Stadium: Stade des Alpes; Attendance: 5,267; Referee: Quentin Guidou

10 January 2023 18	Pau	0–0	Grenoble	Pau
21:00 CET (UTC+1)	Yattara (yellow card) 48'; Abzi (yellow card) 68'	Report	Diarra (yellow card) 12'; Tchaptchet (yellow card) 72'; Monfray (yellow card) 83'	Stadium: Nouste Camp; Attendance: 2,611; Referee: Guillaume Paradis

13 January 2023 19	Guingamp	2–4	Grenoble	Guingamp
21:00 CET (UTC+1)	El Ouazzani 2'; S. Diarra (yellow card) 24'; Quemper (yellow card) 39'; Guillaume (yellow card) 51', (goal) 57'	Report	Sanyang (yellow card) 17'; Tell 43', (yellow card) 56', (goal) 89'; Phaëton 48'; M. Diarra (yellow card) 75'; Correa 83'	Stadium: Stade de Roudourou; Attendance: 6,818; Referee: Faouzi Benchabane

28 January 2023 20	Grenoble	0–1	Bastia	Grenoble
19:00 CEST (UTC+2)	Gaspar (yellow card) 90'; Sbaï (yellow card) 90+2'; Monfray (yellow card) 90+5'	Report	Sainati (yellow card) 65'; Djoco 90'	Stadium: Stade des Alpes; Attendance: 4,392; Referee: Olivier Thual

31 January 2023 21	Grenoble	1–0	Rouen	Grenoble
19:00 CET (UTC+1)	Gaspar (yellow card) 34'; Bénet 71'; Sbaï (yellow card) 79'	Report	Loric (yellow card) 21'; Bonnet (yellow card) 43'; Boé-Kane (yellow card) 78'; Ben Youssef (yellow card) 82'	Stadium: Stade des Alpes; Attendance: 3,783; Referee: Alexandre Perreau Niel

3 February 2023 22	Nîmes	0–2	Grenoble	Nîmes
20:45 CET (UTC+1)	N'Guessan (yellow card) 89'	Report	Phaëton 12'; Touray (yellow card) 44'; Bambock 53'	Stadium: Stade des Antonins; Attendance: 2,125; Referee: Benjamin Lepaysant

11 February 2023 23	Grenoble	1–1	Pau	Grenoble
19:00 CET (UTC+1)	Paquiez (yellow card) 55'; Bénet 73'	Report	Begraoui (penalty scored) 19'; Kouassi (yellow card) 72'; Beusnard (yellow card) 90+4'	Stadium: Stade des Alpes; Attendance: 4,025; Referee: Benoît Millot

18 February 2023 24	Caen	2–1	Grenoble	Caen
19:00 CET (UTC+1)	Daubin (yellow card) 26'; Mendy 65'; Bassette 90+3'	Report	Phaeton 24'; Bambock (yellow card) 66'	Stadium: Stade Michel d'Ornano; Attendance: 11,892; Referee: Thomas Léonard

25 February 2023 25	Grenoble	0–0	Le Havre	Grenoble
19:00 CET (UTC+1)	Bénet (yellow card) 5'; M. Diarra (yellow card) 57'	Report	Targhalline (yellow card) 40'; Richardson (yellow card) 63'; Thiaré (yellow card) 71'; Lekhal (penalty missed) 86'	Stadium: Stade des Alpes; Referee: Antoine Valnet

4 March 2023 26	Dijon	1–0	Grenoble	Dijon
19:00 CET (UTC+1)	Le Bihan 21'; Joly (yellow card) 88'; Pi (yellow card) 90+4'	Report	Gaspar (yellow card) 32'; Sanyang (yellow card) 68'; Touray (yellow card) 74'	Stadium: Stade Gaston-Gérard; Attendance: 4,500; Referee: Olivier Thual

11 March 2023 27	Grenoble	2–1	Annecy	Grenoble
19:00 CET (UTC+1)	Phaëton 4', 72', (red card) 90+4'; Correa (yellow card) 37'	Report	Kashi (yellow card) 23'; Sahi 30'; Testud (yellow card) 50'; Pajot (yellow card) 86' (yellow-red card) 90+4'	Stadium: Stade des Alpes; Attendance: 6,222; Referee: Alexandre Perreau Niel

18 March 2023 28	Sochaux	1–0	Grenoble	Montbéliard
19:00 CET (UTC+1)	Ndiaye (yellow card) 42'; Kanouté (yellow card) 82'; Kalulu 88'	Report	Perez (yellow card) 18'; Maubleu (yellow card) 50'; Ba (yellow card) 61'; Sanyang (yellow card) 71'	Stadium: Stade Auguste Bonal; Attendance: 12,000; Referee: Nicolas Rainville

1 April 2023 29	Grenoble	2–1	Amiens	Grenoble
19:00 CET (UTC+1)	Tourraine (yellow card) 38'; Bénet (penalty scored) 45+1'; Touray (yellow card) 64'; Sanyang 61'	Report	Mendy (yellow card) 79'; Monfray 87' (o.g.)	Stadium: Stade des Alpes; Attendance: 4,258; Referee: Benoît Bastien

8 April 2023 30	Laval	0–1	Grenoble	Laval
19:00 CEST (UTC+2)	Naidji (yellow card) 31'; Nsimba (yellow card) 67'; Roye (yellow card) 90'	Report	Phaëton 7'; Paquiez (yellow card) 88'; Tell (yellow card) 89'	Stadium: Stade Francis Le Basser; Attendance: 6,481; Referee: Olivier Thual

17 April 2023 31	Grenoble	0–2	Saint-Étienne	Grenoble
20:45 CET (UTC+1)	Ba (yellow card) 86'	Report	Nkounkou 46'; Fomba (yellow card) 73'; Krasso 79'	Stadium: Stade des Alpes; Attendance: 14,792; Referee: Pierre Legat

24 April 2023 32	Bordeaux	3–0	Grenoble	Bordeaux
20:45 CEST (UTC+2)	Davitashvili 57'; Maja 42', 64'	Report	Touray (yellow card) 60'	Stadium: Matmut Atlantique; Attendance: 17,731; Referee: Abdelatif Kherradji

29 April 2023 33	Grenoble	2–0	Niort	Grenoble
19:00 CET (UTC+1)	Sanyang 30'; Correa 90'	Report	Bernard (yellow card) 70'	Stadium: Stade des Alpes; Attendance: 3,145; Referee: Gaël Angoula

6 May 2023 34	Paris FC	1–0	Grenoble	Paris
19:00 CEST (UTC+2)	Boutaïb 6'	Report		Stadium: Stade Sébastien Charléty; Attendance: 3,429; Referee: Antoine Valnet

13 May 2023 35	Metz	1–0	Grenoble	Metz
19:00 CEST (UTC+2)	Jallow 47'	Report	Mendy (yellow card) 8'; Paquiez (yellow card) 62'; Nestor (red card) 71'; Isola (yellow card) 76'	Stadium: Stade Saint-Symphorien; Attendance: 22,157; Referee: Faouzi Benchabane

19 May 2023 36	Grenoble	1–1	Rodez	Grenoble
19:00 CET (UTC+1)	Isola 34'; Mendy (yellow card) 74'	Report	Corredor 17'	Stadium: Stade des Alpes; Attendance: 3,880; Referee: Alexandre Perreau Niel

26 May 2023 37	Valenciennes	1–0	Grenoble	Valenciennes
20:45 CEST (UTC+2)	Kaba 57'	Report	Mendy (yellow card) 8'	Stadium: Stade Nungesser; Attendance: 21,790; Referee: Gaël Angoula

2 June 2023 38	Grenoble	0–2	Guingamp	Grenoble
20:45 CET (UTC+1)	Tourraine (yellow card) 13'; Sbaï (penalty missed) 24'; M. Diarra (yellow card) 67'	Report	El Ouazzani 11'; Guillaume 54'; Muyumba (yellow card) 74'	Stadium: Stade des Alpes; Attendance: 5,918; Referee: Guillaume Paradise

=== Coupe de France ===
29 October 2023 Seventh round	AS Illzach Modenheim	1–4	Grenoble	Illzach
15:00 CEST (UTC+2)	Miliani 31'	Report	Phaëton 38'; Tell 42', 49', 66'	Stadium: Stade Joseph Biechlin; Attendance: 886; Referee: Geoffrey Kubler

19 November 2023 Eighth round	Grenoble	2–0	FC Villefranche Beaujolais	Grenoble
15:00 CET (UTC+1)	Sbaï 25'; Ba 54'	Report		Stadium: Stade des Alpes; Attendance: 2,009; Referee: Alexandre Perreau Niel

6 January 2023 Round of 64	Grenoble	1–0	Nîmes	Grenoble
18:00 CET (UTC+1)	Sanyang 88'	Report		Stadium: Stade des Alpes; Attendance: 2,269; Referee: Alexandre Perreau Niel

21 January 2023 Round of 32	Stade Plabennécois	0–1	Grenoble	Kervéguen
18:00 CET (UTC+1)		Report	Sbaï 11'	Stadium: Stade de Kervéguen; Attendance: 2,500; Referee: Marc Bollengier

8 February 2023 Round of 16	Vierzon FC	0–1	Grenoble	Vierzon
18:15 CET (UTC+1)	Bonyonya (yellow card) 70'	Report	Nestor 53'	Stadium: Stade de Brouhot; Attendance: 1,863; Referee: Ruddy Buquet

28 February 2023 Quarter-finals	Lyon	2–1	Grenoble	Décines-Charpieu
21:10 CET (UTC+1)	Barcola 24'; Jeffinho 38'	Report	Sbaï 74'; Bambock (yellow card) 82'	Stadium: Parc Olympique Lyonnais; Attendance: 34,017; Referee: Stéphanie Frappart
