= 2023–24 Grenoble Foot 38 season =

Grenoble Foot 38
2023–24 season
- Manager: Vincent Hognon (until 13 March); Laurent Peyrelade (from 14 March)
- Stadium: Stade des Alpes
- Ligue 2: 11th
- Coupe de France: Eighth round
- Top goalscorer: League: Pape Meïssa Ba (11); All: Pape Meïssa Ba (12)
- Biggest win: Grenoble 5–1 Caen
- Biggest defeat: Grenoble 0–3 Ajaccio
Home colours	Away colours

The 2023–24 season was Grenoble Foot 38's 113th season in existence and sixth consecutive in the Ligue 2. They also competed in the Coupe de France.

== Players ==
=== First-team squad ===
As of 20 July 2023

Note: Flags indicate national team as defined under FIFA eligibility rules; some limited exceptions apply. Players may hold more than one non-FIFA nationality.

No.	Pos.	Nation	Player
1	GK	FRA	Brice Maubleu (captain)
4	MF	FRA	Manuel Perez
5	DF	FRA	Adrien Monfray
6	MF	BEL	Dante Rigo
8	MF	FRA	Jessy Bénet
10	MF	FRA	Eddy Sylvestre
11	FW	FRA	Amine Sbaï
13	GK	SEN	Mamadou Diop
14	DF	GLP	Loïc Nestor
15	MF	NCL	Jekob Jeno

No.	Pos.	Nation	Player
17	FW	MDA	Virgiliu Postolachi
18	MF	BFA	Bachirou Yaméogo
19	FW	FRA	Lenny Joseph
21	DF	FRA	Allan Tchaptchet
22	FW	FRA	Natanael Ntolla
27	DF	FRA	Matthéo Xantippe
28	FW	SEN	Pape Meïssa Ba
29	DF	FRA	Gaëtan Paquiez
66	DF	SEN	Mamadou Diarra
70	MF	GAM	Saikou Touray
77	DF	SEN	Arial Mendy

=== Out on loan ===
Note: Flags indicate national team as defined under FIFA eligibility rules; some limited exceptions apply. Players may hold more than one non-FIFA nationality.

No. / Pos. / Nation / Player	No. / Pos. / Nation / Player; — / FW / SEN / Olivier Boissy (on loan to Saint-Pryvé)

== Transfers ==
=== In ===
Pos.	Player	Transferred from	Fee	Date	Source
FW	(France) Natanael Ntolla	(France) Châteauroux	Undisclosed	13 July 2023	
FW	(France) Lenny Joseph	(France) Metz	Undisclosed	20 July 2023	
FW	(Moldova) Virgiliu Postolachi	(Romania) UTA Arad	€300,000	22 July 2023	

=== Out ===
Pos.	Player	Transferred to	Fee	Date	Source
FW	(Guadeloupe) Matthias Phaëton	(Bulgaria) CSKA Sofia	€2,000,000	1 July 2023	
GK	(France) Esteban Salles	(France) Concarneau	Undisclosed	17 July 2023	
DF	(France) Jules Sylvestre-Brac	(Switzerland) Stade Nyonnais	Free	21 July 2023	
FW	(Guadeloupe) Jordan Tell	Released		29 July 2023	
FW	(The Gambia) Abdoulie Sanyang	(Croatia) HNK Hajduk Split	Free		

== Pre-season and friendlies ==
Win Draw Loss Fixtures

8 July 2023 Friendly	Grenoble (France)	0–0	(France) Paris FC	Aix-les-Bains
11:00				Stadium: Stade Municipal Jacques Forestier

15 July 2023 Friendly	Saint-Étienne (France)	1–2	(France) Grenoble	L'Etrat
11:00	Cissé 50'		Jeno 9'; Mendy 81'	Stadium: Stade Aimé Jacquet

19 July 2023 Friendly	Grenoble (France)	1–0	(France) GOAL	Saint-Marcellin
18:30				Stadium: Stade de la Saulaie

22 July 2023 Friendly	Grenoble (France)	4–0	(France) UNFP
17:30

29 July 2023 Friendly	Grenoble (France)	0–2	(France) Rodez
16:00

6 January 2024 Friendly	Saint-Étienne (France)	3–0	(France) Grenoble
11:00				Attendance: 0
Note: Three periods of 45 minutes

== Competitions ==
=== Overall record ===
Competition	First match	Last match	Starting round	Final position	Record							
Competition	First match	Last match	Starting round	Final position	Pld	W	D	L	GF	GA	GD	Win %
Ligue 2	5 August 2023	17 May 2024	Matchday 1	11th	38	13	12	13	43	44	−1	34.21
Coupe de France	17 November 2023	9 December 2023	Seventh round	Eighth round	2	1	1	0	3	2	+1	50.00
Total					40	14	13	13	46	46	+0	35.00

Source: Soccerway

=== Ligue 2 ===
==== League table ====
Pos	Team	Pld	W	D	L	GF	GA	GD	Pts	Promotion or Relegation
9	Guingamp	38	13	12	13	44	40	+4	51	
10	Pau	38	13	12	13	60	57	+3	51	
11	Grenoble	38	13	12	13	43	44	−1	51	
12	Bordeaux (D, R)	38	14	9	15	50	52	−2	50 (Note: Bordeaux were deducted 1 point due to federation decision.)	Demoted to National 2
13	Bastia	38	14	9	15	44	48	−4	50 (Note: Bastia were deducted 1 point due to federation decision.)	

Updated to match(es) played on 17 May 2024. Source: Ligue 2
Rules for classification: 1) Points; 2) Goal difference; 3) Number of goals scored; 4) Head-to-head goal difference; 5) Fair play points
(D) Disqualified; (R) Relegated

==== Results summary ====
Overall								Home						Away					
Pld	W	D	L	GF	GA	GD	Pts	W	D	L	GF	GA	GD	W	D	L	GF	GA	GD
3	2	1	0	3	0	+3	7	1	1	0	2	0	+2	1	0	0	1	0	+1

Last updated: 2 December 2023.
Source: Ligue 2 BKT

==== Results by round ====
Round	1	2	3
Ground	A	H	H
Result	W	W	D
Position	5	2	

Updated to match(es) played on 2 December 2023. Source: Ligue 2 BKT
A = Away; H = Home; W = Win; D = Draw; L = Loss

==== Matches ====
The league fixtures were unveiled on 29 June 2023.

5 August 2023 1	Saint-Étienne	0–1	Grenoble	Saint-Étienne
15:00 UTC+2	Sissoko (yellow card) 43'; Sow (yellow card) 78'; Charbonnier (penalty missed) 83'		Touray (yellow card) 22'; Sanyang 90+1'	Stadium: Stade Geoffroy-Guichard; Referee: Pierre Legat

12 August 2023 2	Grenoble	2–0	Paris FC	Grenoble
19:00 UTC+2	Tourraine (yellow card) 44', (goal) 63'; Sbaï 89'	Report	Doucet (yellow card) 58'; Gory (yellow card) 65'; Mandouki (red card) 70'	Stadium: Stade des Alpes; Attendance: 3,743; Referee: Guillaume Paradis

19 August 2023 3	Grenoble	0–0	Troyes	Grenoble
19:00 UTC+2	Diarra (yellow card) 90+5'	Report	Boura (yellow card) 49'; Ilić (red card) 88'	Stadium: Stade des Alpes; Referee: Nicolas Rainville

26 August 2023 4	Auxerre	0–0	Grenoble	Auxerre
19:00

2 September 2023 5	Grenoble	0–0	Bastia	Grenoble
19:00		Report		Stadium: Stade des Alpes

16 September 2023 6	Dunkerque	0–0	Grenoble	Dunkirk
19:00		Report		Stadium: Stade Marcel-Tribut

4 November 2023 13	Grenoble	0–3	Ajaccio	Grenoble
19:00				Stadium: Stade des Alpes

11 November 2023 14	Amiens	1–2	Grenoble	Amiens
19:00				Stadium: Stade de la Licorne

25 November 2023 15	Grenoble	2–1	Rodez	Grenoble
19:00				Stadium: Stade des Alpes

2 December 2023 16	Laval	1–1	Grenoble	Laval
19:00				Stadium: Stade Francis Le Basser

5 December 2023 17	Angers	v	Grenoble	Angers
20:45		Report		Stadium: Stade Raymond Kopa; Referee: Nicolas Rainville

16 December 2023 18	Grenoble	v	Annecy	Grenoble
19:00				Stadium: Stade des Alpes

19 December 2023 19	Concarneau	v	Grenoble	TBD

13 January 2024 20	Grenoble	v	Dunkerque	Grenoble
				Stadium: Stade des Alpes

23 January 2024 21	Grenoble	v	Auxerre	Grenoble
				Stadium: Stade des Alpes

20 April 2024 33	Annecy	v	Grenoble	Annecy

=== Coupe de France ===
17 November 2023 Seventh round	Villefranche	1–2	Grenoble	Villefranche-sur-Saône
19:30		Report		Stadium: Stade Armand Chouffet

9 December 2023 Eighth round	Chambéry SF	v	Grenoble	Chambéry
19:00		Report		Stadium: Stade Municipal de Chambéry
