= 2021–22 Grenoble Foot 38 season =

Grenoble
2021–22 season
- Owner: Stéphane Rosnoblet
- President: Stéphane Rosnoblet
- Head coach: Vincent Hognon
- Stadium: Stade des Alpes
- Ligue 2: 15th
- Coupe de France: Eighth round
- Top goalscorer: League: Achille Anani; Yoric Ravet (5 each); All: Achille Anani (6)
Home colours	Away colours	Third colours

The 2021–22 season was the 111th season in the existence of Grenoble Foot 38 and the club's third consecutive season in the second division of French football. In addition to the domestic league, Grenoble participated in this season's edition of the Coupe de France.

== Players ==
=== First-team squad ===
Note: Flags indicate national team as defined under FIFA eligibility rules; some limited exceptions apply. Players may hold more than one non-FIFA nationality.

No.	Pos.	Nation	Player
1	GK	FRA	Brice Maubleu (captain)
2	FW	GAM	Abdoulie Sanyang
3	DF	NED	Bart Straalman
4	MF	FRA	Manuel Perez
5	DF	FRA	Adrien Monfray
6	MF	FRA	Franck-Yves Bambock
7	MF	GEO	Giorgi Kokhreidze
8	MF	FRA	Anthony Belmonte
10	MF	FRA	Florian Michel
11	FW	CIV	Achille Anani
12	DF	FRA	Jordy Gaspar
14	DF	GLP	Loïc Nestor
16	GK	FRA	Paul Bourdelle
17	DF	FRA	Loris Néry

No.	Pos.	Nation	Player
18	MF	ARG	Manuel de Iriondo
19	FW	GUI	Mamadou Diallo
20	DF	AUS	Alex Gersbach
21	DF	FRA	Allan Tchaptchet
22	MF	FRA	Yoric Ravet
23	MF	FRA	Axel Ngando
24	FW	FRA	Jordan Tell
25	MF	KOS	Orges Bunjaku
26	FW	FRA	Joris Correa
27	FW	SEN	Olivier Boissy
29	DF	COM	Akim Abdallah
30	GK	FRA	Esteban Salles
33	MF	SEN	Souleymane Cissé
34	FW	FRA	Zinedine Labyad

=== Out on loan ===
Note: Flags indicate national team as defined under FIFA eligibility rules; some limited exceptions apply. Players may hold more than one non-FIFA nationality.

No.	Pos.	Nation	Player
—	DF	FRA	Jules Sylvestre-Brac (at Moulins Yzeure)

== Pre-season and friendlies ==
Win Draw Loss Fixtures

6 July 2021 Friendly	Dijon (France)	1–1	(France) Grenoble	Mâcon, France
18:00 CEST (UTC+2)				Stadium: Stade Pierre Guérin

14 July 2021 Friendly	Clermont (France)	0–0	(France) Grenoble	Espaly-Saint-Marcel, France
18:00 CEST (UTC+2)				Stadium: Stade Charles Massot

17 July 2021 Friendly	Saint-Étienne (France)	2–1	(France) Grenoble	Andrézieux-Bouthéon, France
18:00 CEST (UTC+2)	Bouanga 31'; Tormin 85' (pen.)		Diallo 2'	Stadium: L'Envol Stadium

== Competitions ==
=== Overall record ===
Competition	First match	Last match	Starting round	Final position	Record							
Competition	First match	Last match	Starting round	Final position	Pld	W	D	L	GF	GA	GD	Win %
Ligue 2	24 July 2021	14 May 2022	Matchday 1	15th	38	12	8	18	32	44	−12	31.58
Coupe de France	13 November 2021	27 November 2021	Seventh round	Eighth round	2	1	0	1	2	4	−2	50.00
Total					40	13	8	19	34	48	−14	32.50

Source: Soccerway

=== Ligue 2 ===
==== League table ====
Pos	Team	Pld	W	D	L	GF	GA	GD	Pts
13	Niort	38	12	10	16	39	42	−3	46
14	Amiens	38	9	17	12	43	41	+2	44
15	Grenoble	38	12	8	18	32	44	−12	44
16	Valenciennes	38	10	14	14	34	47	−13	44
17	Rodez	38	10	13	15	32	42	−10	43

Source: Ligue 2
Rules for classification: 1) Points; 2) Goal difference; 3) Number of goals scored; 4) Head-to-head goal difference; 5) Fair play points

==== Results summary ====
Overall								Home						Away					
Pld	W	D	L	GF	GA	GD	Pts	W	D	L	GF	GA	GD	W	D	L	GF	GA	GD
38	12	8	18	32	44	−12	44	7	5	7	21	21	0	5	3	11	11	23	−12

Source: Ligue 2

==== Results by round ====
Round	1	2	3	4	5	6	7	8	9	10	11	12	13	14	15	16	17	18	19	20	21	22	23	24	25	26	27	28	29	30	31	32	33	34	35	36	37	38
Ground	H	A	H	A	H	A	H	A	H	A	H	A	H	A	H	A	H	A	A	H	A	H	A	H	A	H	A	H	A	H	A	H	A	H	A	H	H	A
Result	L	L	D	L	W	L	W	L	W	D	W	D	L	W	W	L	L	L	L	L	D	W	L	L	L	L	W	D	W	D	L	L	W	W	W	D	D	L
Position	19	20	19	20	17	17	14	16	15	14	14	11	14	11	9	10	11	15	16	18	16	18	18	18	18	19	18	19	17	16	17	18	16	15	14	15	14	15

Source: Ligue 2
A = Away; H = Home; W = Win; D = Draw; L = Loss

==== Matches ====
The league fixtures were announced on 25 June 2021.

24 July 2021 1	Grenoble	0–4	Paris FC	Grenoble
19:00 CEST (UTC+2)	Bunjaku (yellow card) 74'; Anani (yellow card) 79'	Report	Laura 37'; Perez 52' (o.g.); Name 72'; Alfarela 90+1'	Stadium: Stade des Alpes; Referee: Pierre Gaillouste

2 August 2021 2	Auxerre	3–0	Grenoble	Auxerre
20:45 CEST (UTC+2)	Autret 3' (pen.); Hein 14'; Sakhi 85'	Report	Bunjaku (yellow card) 42'	Stadium: Stade de l'Abbé-Deschamps; Referee: Romain Lissorgue

7 August 2021 3	Grenoble	0–0	Guingamp	Grenoble
19:00 CEST (UTC+2)	de Iriondo (yellow card) 65'; Néry (yellow card) 79'	Report	Bilingi (yellow card) 70' (yellow-red card) 77'; Pierrot (yellow card) 78'; Phaëton (yellow card) 79'	Stadium: Stade des Alpes; Referee: Jérôme Miguelgorry

14 August 2021 4	Niort	1–0	Grenoble	Niort
19:00 CEST (UTC+2)	Boutobba 45+2'; Cassubie (yellow card) 48'; Bâ (yellow card) 51'; Braat (yellow card) 78'	Report	Monfray (yellow card) 33'; Belmonte (yellow card) 48' de Iriondo (red card) 54'; Pickel (yellow card) 54'; Ravet (penalty missed) 80'	Stadium: Stade René Gaillard; Referee: Guillaume Paradis

21 August 2021 5	Grenoble	2–0	Quevilly-Rouen	Grenoble
19:00 CEST (UTC+2)	Ravet 31'; Pickel 52'	Report	Nazon (yellow card) 29'	Stadium: Stade des Alpes; Referee: Frank Schneider

28 August 2021 6	Sochaux	1–0	Grenoble	Montbéliard
19:00 CEST (UTC+2)	Weissbeck 43'; Kaabouni (yellow card) 78'; Ndiaye (yellow card) 90+4'	Report	Monfray (yellow card) 65'	Stadium: Stade Auguste Bonal; Referee: Olivier Thual

11 September 2021 7	Grenoble	2–1	Nîmes	Grenoble
19:00 CEST (UTC+2)	Monfray (yellow card) 48'; Diallo 54'; Néry (yellow card) 64'; Henen 90+3', (yellow card) 90+4'	Report	Delpech 1'; Burner (yellow card) 61'; Aribi (yellow card) 65'; Martinez (yellow card) 74'; Koné (yellow card) 86'	Stadium: Stade des Alpes; Referee: Bastien Dechepy

18 September 2021 8	Toulouse	4–1	Grenoble	Toulouse
15:00 CEST (UTC+2)	Evitt-Healey 23'; Onaiwu 34', 47'; Desler (yellow card) 54'; Spierings (yellow card) 45+1'; Ngoumou 71'	Report	Anani 79'	Stadium: Stadium de Toulouse; Referee: Alexandre Perreau Niel

21 September 2021 9	Grenoble	4–1	Nancy	Grenoble
19:00 CEST (UTC+2)	Ravet 25'; Anani (penalty missed) 45+1'; Perez (red card) 45+2'; Sylvestre-Brac 50'; Nestor 58'; Diallo (yellow card) 78'; Abdallah 85'	Report	Bianda 32'; El Aynaoui (yellow card) 39'; Trott (yellow card) 45'; Patrick (yellow card) 49'	Stadium: Stade des Alpes; Referee: Pierre Legat

24 September 2021 10	Rodez	1–1	Grenoble	Rodez
19:00 CET (UTC+1)	M'Pasi (yellow card) 24'; David 90+4', (yellow card) 90+4'	Report	Belmonte 25' (pen.); Abdallah (yellow card) 86'	Stadium: Stade Paul-Lignon; Referee: Jérôme Miguelgorry

2 October 2021 11	Grenoble	2–0	Pau	Grenoble
19:00 CEST (UTC+2)	Diallo 39'; Ravet 45+1' (pen.)	Report	Daubin (yellow card) 41'; Olliero (yellow card) 44'	Stadium: Stade des Alpes; Referee: Benjamin Lepaysant

16 October 2021 12	Bastia	0–0	Grenoble	Furiani
19:00 CEST (UTC+2)		Report	Gaspar (yellow card) 44'; Gersbach (yellow card) 54'	Stadium: Stade Armand Cesari; Referee: Nicolas Rainville

23 October 2021 13	Grenoble	1–2	Dijon	Grenoble
19:00 CEST (UTC+2)	Ravet 29'; Cissé (yellow card) 30'; Bambock (yellow card) 35'	Report	Coulibaly (yellow card) 28'; Benzia 57'; Dobre 76'; Pi (yellow card) 87'	Stadium: Stade des Alpes; Referee: Gaël Angoula

30 October 2021 14	Caen	0–1	Grenoble	Caen
19:00 CEST (UTC+2)	da Costa (yellow card) 32'	Report	Monfray 44'; Anani (yellow card) 84'	Stadium: Stade Michel d'Ornano; Attendance: 8,651; Referee: Arnaud Baert

6 November 2021 15	Grenoble	1–0	Dunkerque	Grenoble
19:00 CEST (UTC+2)	Bambock (yellow card) 43'; Belmonte (yellow card) 49'; Nestor 90+3'; Kokhreidze (yellow card) 90+5'	Report	Kikonda (yellow card) 2' (yellow-red card) 44'	Stadium: Stade des Alpes; Referee: Frank Schneider

20 November 2021 16	Valenciennes	1–0	Grenoble	Valenciennes
20:45 CET (UTC+1)	Guillaume 21'; Kaba (yellow card) 55'; D'Almeida (yellow card) 76'	Report	Maubleu (red card) 32'; Ravet (yellow card) 82'	Stadium: Stade du Hainaut; Referee: Gaël Angoula

3 December 2021 17	Grenoble	1–2	Le Havre	Grenoble
19:00 CET (UTC+1)	Gaspar (yellow card) 42'; Monfray (yellow card) 52'; Henen 90+3'	Report	Lekhal (yellow card) 36'; Bonnet 43' (pen.); Sangante (yellow card) 55'; Alioui 86'	Stadium: Stade des Alpes; Referee: Marc Bollengier

11 December 2021 18	Amiens	4–1	Grenoble	Amiens
19:00 CET (UTC+1)	Arokodare 35', 44'; Badji 51', 56'	Report	Anani (yellow card) 53', (goal) 85'; Belmonte (yellow card) 70'	Stadium: Stade de la Licorne; Referee: Frank Schneider

21 December 2021 19	Ajaccio	1–0	Grenoble	Ajaccio
20:45 CET (UTC+1)	Courtet (yellow card) 45'; Nouri 49'	Report	Monfray (yellow card) 22'; Anani (yellow card) 45+1'; Henen (yellow card) 60'; Correa (yellow card) 90+1'; Perez (red card) 90+6'	Stadium: Stade François Coty; Referee: Arnaud Baert

8 January 2022 20	Grenoble	0–1	Auxerre	Grenoble
19:00 CET (UTC+1)	Gaspar (yellow card) 84'	Report	Georgen (yellow card) 25'; Charbonnier 31'; Joly (yellow card) 55'; Touré (yellow card) 90+3'	Stadium: Stade des Alpes; Referee: Benjamin Lepaysant

15 January 2022 21	Guingamp	0–0	Grenoble	Guingamp
20:45 CET (UTC+1)	Ba (yellow card) 15'; Barthelmé (yellow card) 45+1'; Quemper (yellow card) 90+4'	Report	Jeno (yellow card) 72'	Stadium: Stade de Roudourou; Referee: Guillaume Paradis

5 February 2022 23	Quevilly-Rouen	1–0	Grenoble	Rouen
19:00 CET (UTC+1)	Gbellé (yellow card) 49'; Jozefzoon 72'; Boé-Kane (yellow card) 88'	Report	Monfray (yellow card) 6'; Perez (yellow card) 14'; Tell (yellow card) 43'; Gaspar (yellow card) 82'	Stadium: Stade Robert Diochon; Referee: Arnaud Baert

12 February 2022 24	Grenoble	1–3	Sochaux	Grenoble
19:00 CET (UTC+1)	Tell 1'; Bambock (yellow card) 10'; Ravet (yellow card) 24'; Perez (yellow card) 86'	Report	Weissbeck 31'; Thioune (yellow card) 42'; Aaneba (yellow card) 50'; Do Couto (red card) 52'; Mauricio 87' (pen.); Kitala 90+1'	Stadium: Stade des Alpes; Referee: Abdelatif Kherradji

15 February 2022 22	Grenoble	1–0	Niort	Grenoble
19:00 CET (UTC+1)	Jeno (yellow card) 39'; Nestor 47'; Néry (yellow card) 66'; Bambock (yellow card) 83'	Report	Passi (yellow card) 72'	Stadium: Stade des Alpes; Referee: Mikael Lesage

19 February 2022 25	Nîmes	3–1	Grenoble	Nîmes
20:45 CET (UTC+1)	Koné 37', 58'; Eliasson 73'; Ponceau (yellow card) 77'; Valério (yellow card) 82'; Paquiez (yellow card) 86'	Report	Jeno (yellow card) 15' (yellow-red card) 24'; Correa 62'	Stadium: Stade des Costières; Referee: Alexandre Perreau Niel

28 February 2022 26	Grenoble	0–2	Toulouse	Grenoble
20:45 CET (UTC+1)	Perez (yellow card) 5'; Cissé (yellow card) 59'	Report	Van den Boomen (yellow card) 27', (goal) 74'; Evitt-Healey (yellow card) 39'; Ngoumou 84'	Stadium: Stade des Alpes; Referee: Olivier Thual

5 March 2022 27	Nancy	0–1	Grenoble	Tomblaine
19:00 CET (UTC+1)	Basila (yellow card) 40'; Lefebvre (yellow card) 78'; Biron (yellow card) 85'; N'Gbakoto (yellow card) 90+6'; Simões (red card) 90+6'	Report	Cissé (yellow card) 27'; Tell 59'; Abdallah (yellow card) 85'	Stadium: Stade Marcel Picot; Referee: Nicolas Rainville

12 March 2022 28	Grenoble	0–0	Rodez	Grenoble
19:00 CET (UTC+1)	Michel (yellow card) 87'	Report	Buadés (yellow card) 37'; M'Pasi (yellow card) 83'; Leborgne (yellow card) 85'; Malanda (yellow card) 85'; David (yellow card) 90'	Stadium: Stade des Alpes; Referee: Frank Schneider

15 March 2022 29	Pau	0–1	Grenoble	Pau
19:00 CET (UTC+1)	Dembélé (yellow card) 8'; Daubin (yellow card) 27'; Sylvestre (yellow card) 28'; Armand (yellow card) 46'; Kouassi (yellow card) 80'	Report	Ravet 29' (pen.); Abdallah (yellow card) 34'; Gaspar (yellow card) 54' (yellow-red card) 64'; Nestor (yellow card) 71'; Maubleu (yellow card) 77'; Anani (yellow card) 85'	Stadium: Nouste Camp; Referee: Mathieu Vernice

19 March 2022 30	Grenoble	1–1	Bastia	Grenoble
20:00 CET (UTC+1)	Anani 52'; Perez (yellow card) 60'	Report	Kaïboué (yellow card) 45+1'; Sylla 65'; Le Cardinal (yellow card) 74'	Stadium: Stade des Alpes; Referee: Pierre Legat

2 April 2022 31	Dijon	1–0	Grenoble	Dijon
19:00 CET (UTC+1)	Le Bihan 85'	Report	Correa (yellow card) 58'; Abdallah (red card) 69'; Sanyang (yellow card) 78'	Stadium: Stade Gaston Gérard; Referee: Nicolas Rainville

9 April 2022 32	Grenoble	0–2	Caen	Grenoble
19:00 CEST (UTC+2)	Bunjaku (yellow card) 88'	Report	Court (yellow card) 80'; Mendy 83'; Jeannot 90+1'	Stadium: Stade des Alpes; Referee: Jérôme Miguelgorry

16 April 2022 33	Dunkerque	0–3	Grenoble	Dunkirk
19:00 CEST (UTC+2)		Report	Nestor 43'; Sanyang 45+1', 64'; Belmonte (yellow card) 82'	Stadium: Stade Marcel-Tribut; Referee: Mathieu Vernice

19 April 2022 34	Grenoble	3–0	Valenciennes	Grenoble
20:00 CEST (UTC+2)	Jeno (yellow card) 24'; Tell 31' (pen.); Michel (yellow card) 45+2' de Iriondo (yellow card) 65'; Bambock (yellow card) 83'; Correa 85'; Anani 88'	Report	Linguet (yellow card) 63'; Ntim (yellow card) 90'	Stadium: Stade des Alpes; Referee: Olivier Thual

22 April 2022 35	Le Havre	0–1	Grenoble	Le Havre
21:00 CET (UTC+1)		Report	Sanyang 72'	Stadium: Stade Océane; Referee: Arnaud Baert

30 April 2022 36	Grenoble	1–1	Amiens	Grenoble
19:00 CEST (UTC+2)	Anani 39'; Gaspar (yellow card) 49'	Report	Pavlović (yellow card) 49'; Mandefu (yellow card) 53'; Badji 65'; Akolo (yellow card) 77'	Stadium: Stade des Alpes; Referee: Gaël Angoula

7 May 2022 37	Grenoble	1–1	Ajaccio	Grenoble
19:00 CEST (UTC+2)	Néry 39'; Monfray (yellow card) 54' (red card) 59'; Correa (yellow card) 88' de Iriondo (yellow card) 90'	Report	Nouri 64'	Stadium: Stade des Alpes; Referee: Vernice

14 May 2022 38	Paris FC	2–0	Grenoble	Paris
19:00 CEST (UTC+2)	Bernauer 52'; López 56'	Report	Gaspar (yellow card) 20'; Anani (yellow card) 89'	Stadium: Stade Sébastien Charléty; Referee: Marc Bollengier

=== Coupe de France ===
13 November 2021 Seventh round	FC Saint-Cyr Collonges au Mont d'Or	1–2	Grenoble	Craponne
14:00 CET (UTC+1)	Moukaddam 75' (pen.)	Report	Anani 6'; Boissy 26'	Stadium: Stade Charles Trévoux; Referee: Aurélien Petit

27 November 2021 Eighth round	Andrézieux-Bouthéon FC	3–0	Grenoble	Andrézieux-Bouthéon
17:00 CET (UTC+1)	Cabaton 23'; Mathieu 30', 86'	Report		Stadium: L'Envol Stadium; Referee: Nicolas Rainville
