= Saint-Félicien =

Saint-Félicien may refer to:

Places:

- Saint-Félicien, Ardèche
- Saint-Félicien, Quebec

Food:

- Saint-Félicien cheese
