= Allan Tchaptchet =

French footballer (born 2001)

Personal information
- Full name: Wandja Allan Tchaptchet
- Date of birth: 21 December 2001 (age 24)
- Place of birth: Besançon, France
- Height: 1.93 m (6 ft 4 in)
- Position: Defender

Team information
- Current team: Virton
- Number: 3

Youth career
- 2007–2009: Jura Dolois Football
- 2009–2013: Promo Sport Dole Crissey
- 2013–2015: Cergy Pontoise
- 2015–2018: Auxerre
- 2018–2021: Southampton

Senior career*
Years	Team	Apps	(Gls)
2021	Southampton	1	(0)
2022–2026	Grenoble	53	(1)
2026–	Virton	9	(0)

International career^{‡}
2016	France U16	2	(0)
- * Club domestic league appearances and goals as of 06:32, 14 November 2026 (UTC) ‡ National team caps and goals as of 21:44, 2 February 2021 (UTC)

Wandja Allan Tchaptchet (born 21 December 2001) is a French professional footballer who plays as a defender for Challenger Pro League club Virton.

== Club career ==
Tchaptchet joined Southampton in the summer of 2018 and signed his first professional deal in December 2018, committing to the club until June 2021. On 16 January 2021, he made the bench for senior game for the first time, remaining as an unused substitute in a defeat against Leicester City. On 2 February 2021, he made his senior debut, coming on as a substitute for the final 12 minutes in a 9–0 loss to Manchester United.

Tchaptchet left Southampton in July 2021 after failing to agree a new deal with the club.

Tchaptchet joined Grenoble in French Ligue 2 in January 2022. He was a free agent and signed a two-and-a-half-year deal at the Stade des Alpes.

Tchaptchet left Grenoble in August 2026 and signed in Belgium with Royal Excelsior Virton in the Challenger Pro League.

== International career ==
Born in France, Thchaptchet is of Cameroonian descent. He is a youth international for France.

== Career statistics ==
=== Club ===
As of matches played 7 November 2026

Appearances and goals by club, season and competition
Club	Season	League			Domestic Cup (Note: Includes FA Cup, Coupe de France, Belgian Cup)		League Cup (Note: Includes EFL Cup)		Other		Total	
Club	Season	Division	Apps	Goals	Apps	Goals	Apps	Goals	Apps	Goals	Apps	Goals
Southampton U21	2020–21	—			—		—		3 (Note: Appearance(s) in the EFL Trophy)	0	3	0
Southampton	2020–21	Premier League	1	0	0	0	0	0	0	0	1	0
Grenoble	2021–22	Ligue 2	2	0	0	0	—		—		2	0
Grenoble	2022–23	Ligue 2	24	1	3	0	—		—		27	1
Grenoble	2023–24	Ligue 2	1	0	0	0	—		—		1	0
Grenoble	2024–25	Ligue 2	25	0	2	0	—		—		27	0
Grenoble	2025–26	Ligue 2	1	0	0	0	—		—		1	0
Grenoble	Total		53	1	5	0	—		—		58	1
Virton	2026–27	Challenger Pro League	9	0	1	0	—		—		10	0
Career total			63	1	6	0	0	0	3	0	72	1
