= Abdoulie Sanyang =

Gambian footballer (born 1999)

Personal information
- Date of birth: 8 May 1999 (age 27)
- Place of birth: Serekunda, The Gambia
- Height: 1.73 m (5 ft 8 in)
- Position: Right winger

Team information
- Current team: Hajduk Split
- Number: 7

Youth career
- –2019: Superstars Academy

Senior career*
Years	Team	Apps	(Gls)
2016–2022	Superstars Academy	0	(0)
2018–2019	→ Bnei Yehuda (loan)	0	(0)
2019–2020	→ Lommel (loan)	22	(2)
2020–2022	→ Beerschot (loan)	30	(1)
2022–2024	Grenoble	72	(11)
2024–	Hajduk Split	60	(8)

International career^{‡}
2020–	Gambia	22	(0)
- * Club domestic league appearances and goals as of 31 October 2026 ‡ National team caps and goals as of 14 August 2026

Abdoulie Sanyang (born 8 May 1999) is a Gambian professional footballer who plays as a right winger for Croatian Football League club Hajduk Split.

== Club career ==
Sanyang joined Lommel in the summer 2019 transfer window, arriving on a loan basis from Superstars Academy in Gambia together with his fellow countrymen Alieu Jallow and Salif Kujabi. Sanyang was awarded several starts over the coming months and even managed to score the equalizing goal in the 2019–20 Belgian Cup match against Standard Liège, his team eventually going down 2–1 due to a last minute winner by the home team.

On 1 February 2022, Sanyang signed a 2.5-year contract with French club Grenoble.

On 18 July 2024, Sanyang was signed on a permanent deal from Grenoble to the Croatian club Hajduk Split until 2027.

== Career statistics ==
=== Club ===
As of match played 11 October 2026

Appearances and goals by club, season and competition
Club	Season	League			National cup (Note: Includes Belgian Cup, Coupe de France, Croatian Cup)		Europe		Other		Total	
Club	Season	Division	Apps	Goals	Apps	Goals	Apps	Goals	Apps	Goals	Apps	Goals
Lommel (loan)	2019–20	Challenger Pro League	22	2	1	1	—		—		23	3
Beerschot (loan)	2020–21	Belgian First Division A	19	0	1	0	—		—		20	0
Beerschot (loan)	2021–22	Belgian First Division A	11	1	0	0	—		—		11	1
Beerschot (loan)	Total		30	1	1	0	—		—		31	1
Grenoble	2021–22	Ligue 2	12	3	—		—		—		12	3
Grenoble	2022–23	Ligue 2	30	7	4	1	—		—		34	8
Grenoble	2023–24	Ligue 2	30	1	1	0	—		—		31	1
Grenoble	Total		72	11	5	1	—		—		77	12
Hajduk Split	2024–25	Prva HNL	22	2	1	1	4 (Note: Appearances in UEFA Conference League)	0	—		27	3
Hajduk Split	2025–26	Prva Hnl	26	3	1	0	2	1	—		29	4
Hajduk Split	2026–27	Prva HNL	12	3	1	0	6 (Note: Appearance in UEFA Europa League)	0	—		16	2
Hajduk Split	Total		60	7	3	1	12	1	—		72	9
Career total			184	22	10	3	12	1	0	0	203	25
