= Pape Meïssa Ba =

Senegalese footballer

Personal information
- Date of birth: 4 July 1997 (age 29)
- Place of birth: Dakar, Senegal
- Height: 1.87 m (6 ft 2 in)
- Position: Forward

Team information
- Current team: Nancy

Senior career*
Years	Team	Apps	(Gls)
2015–2019	Dakar Sacré-Coeur		
2019–2021	Troyes II	16	(6)
2019–2021	Troyes	20	(3)
2021–2022	Red Star	46	(24)
2022–2025	Grenoble	87	(23)
2025	Schalke 04	13	(2)
2025–2026	Widzew Łódź	4	(0)
2026	→ Red Star (loan)	15	(2)
2026–	Nancy	0	(0)
- * Club domestic league appearances and goals as of 11 May 2026

Pape Meïssa Ba (born 4 July 1997) is a Senegalese professional footballer who plays as a forward for Ligue 2 club Nancy.

== Career ==
Ba is a youth product of Dakar Sacré-Coeur. On 23 February 2019, he signed a professional contract with Troyes. He made his professional debut in a 0–0 Ligue 2 tie with Nancy on 8 November 2019. On 3 December 2019, he scored his first senior goal for the club in a Ligue 2 match against Rodez.

On 31 January 2021, Ba joined Championnat National club Red Star, where he became a regular starter. In the 2021–22 Championnat National, he finished as top scorer with 21 goals. In June 2022, Ba signed for Ligue 2 side Grenoble on a three-year contract.

On 29 January 2025, Ba signed a three-and-a-half-year contract with 2. Bundesliga club Schalke 04.

On 5 September 2025, Ba moved to Widzew Łódź in Poland on a three-season deal. On 7 January 2026, Ba returned to France and re-joined Red Star in Ligue 2 on loan.

On 1 September 2026, a day after terminating his contract with Widzew, Ba joined Ligue 2 side Nancy.

== Career statistics ==
As of match played 12 May 2026

Appearances and goals by club, season and competition
Club	Season	League			National cup (Note: Includes Coupe de France)		Other		Total	
Club	Season	Division	Apps	Goals	Apps	Goals	Apps	Goals	Apps	Goals
Troyes II	2018–19	Championnat National 3	5	2	—		—		5	2
Troyes II	2019–20	Championnat National 3	11	4	—		—		11	4
Troyes II	Total		16	6	—		—		16	6
Troyes	2019–20	Ligue 2	9	1	1	0	—		10	1
Troyes	2020–21	Ligue 2	11	2	0	0	—		11	2
Troyes	Total		20	3	1	0	—		21	3
Red Star	2020–21	Championnat National	15	3	4	3	—		19	6
Red Star	2021–22	Championnat National	31	21	2	0	—		33	21
Red Star	Total		46	24	6	3	—		52	27
Grenoble	2022–23	Ligue 2	35	2	5	1	—		40	3
Grenoble	2023–24	Ligue 2	34	11	1	1	—		35	12
Grenoble	2024–25	Ligue 2	18	10	2	1	—		20	11
Grenoble	Total		87	23	8	3	—		95	26
Schalke 04	2024–25	2. Bundesliga	13	2	—		—		13	2
Widzew Łódź	2025–26	Ekstraklasa	4	0	0	0	—		4	0
Red Star (loan)	2025–26	Ligue 2	15	2	—		1 (Note: Appearance in Ligue 2 promotion play-offs)	0	16	2
Nancy	2026–27	Ligue 2	0	0	0	0	—		0	0
Career total			201	60	15	6	1	0	217	66
