= Virgiliu Postolachi =

Moldovan footballer (born 2000)

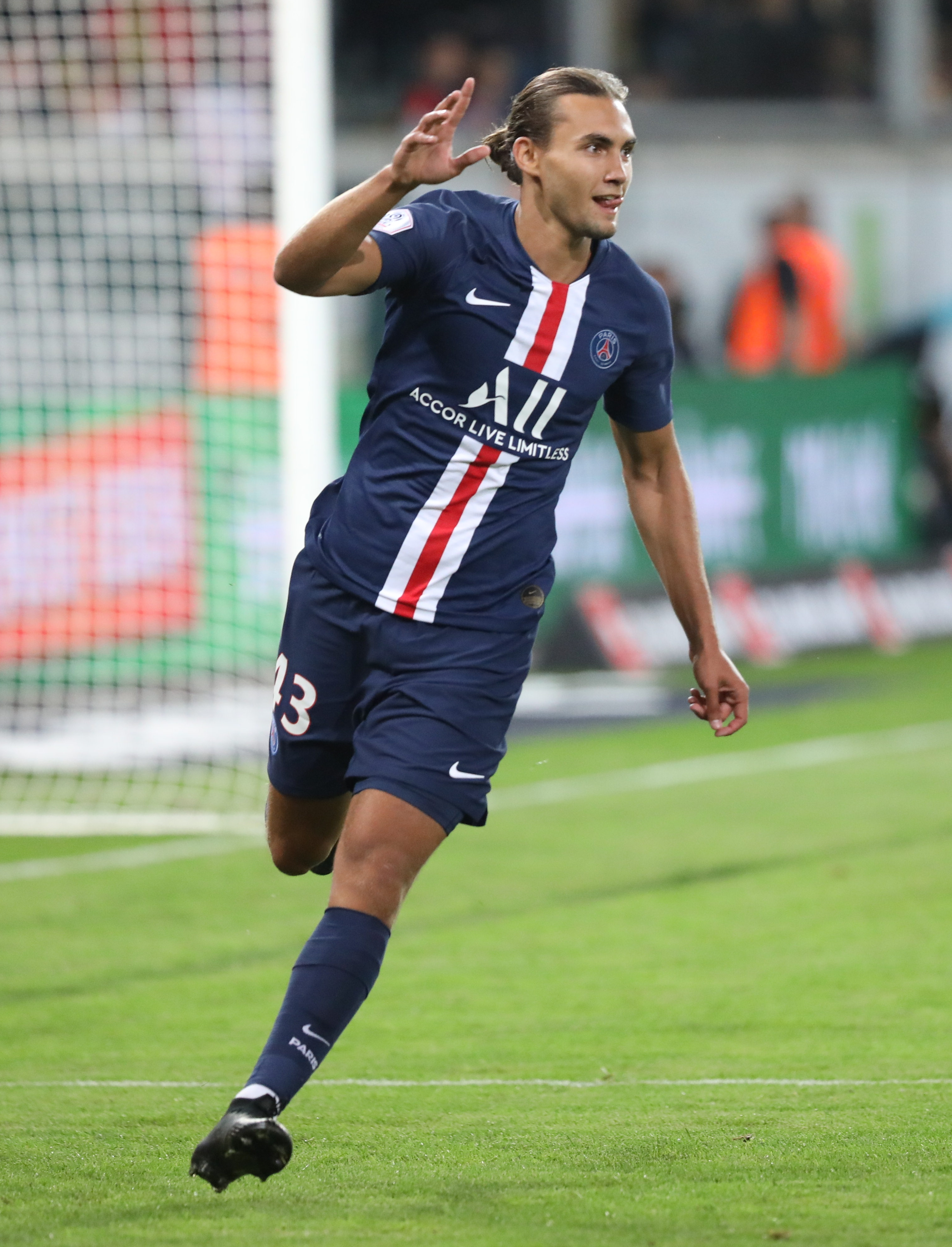
- Postolachi with Paris Saint-Germain in 2019

Personal information
- Date of birth: 17 March 2000 (age 26)
- Place of birth: Edineț, Moldova
- Height: 1.88 m (6 ft 2 in)
- Positions: Forward; right winger

Team information
- Current team: Brisbane Roar
- Number: 9

Youth career
- 2013–2018: Paris Saint-Germain

Senior career*
Years	Team	Apps	(Gls)
2018–2019	Paris Saint-Germain B	36	(5)
2019–2020	Lille B	17	(0)
2020–2022	Mouscron	13	(0)
2021	→ Vendsyssel (loan)	14	(0)
2022–2023	UTA Arad	38	(10)
2023–2024	Grenoble	32	(3)
2024–2025	CFR Cluj	36	(7)
2025–2026	Universitatea Cluj	17	(1)
2026–	Brisbane Roar	3	(0)

International career^{‡}
2021	Moldova U21	5	(0)
2021–	Moldova	37	(1)
- * Club domestic league appearances and goals as of 8 November 2026 ‡ National team caps and goals as of 9 June 2026

Virgiliu Postolachi (born 17 March 2000) is a Moldovan professional footballer who plays as a forward for A-League Men club Brisbane Roar and the Moldova national team.

== Club career ==
A youth academy product of Paris Saint-Germain, Postolachi joined Lille on 18 July 2019. He signed a four-year deal with Les Dogues and was initially assigned to the reserve side of club.

Postolachi joined Belgian club Mouscron prior to 2020–21 season. He made his professional debut on 8 August 2020 in a 1–1 draw against Antwerp. On 31 January 2021, Postolachi was loaned out to Danish 1st Division club Vendsyssel for the rest of the season.

On 20 July 2022, Romanian club UTA Arad announced the signing of Postolachi on a two-year deal.

On 22 July 2023, Ligue 2 club Grenoble announced the signing of Postolachi on a three-year deal until June 2026. On 30 September 2023, he scored his first goal in a 2–0 win against Bordeaux.

On 25 July 2024, Postolachi joined Romanian club CFR Cluj.

== International career ==
Postolachi previously rejected call-ups from Moldova national team in the past. Romania have tried to make him part of their national team setup, but didn't receive permission from UEFA and FIFA.

In January 2021, Postolachi joined training camp of Moldova under-21 team and played in a friendly against Sfîntul Gheorghe. He made his senior debut on 25 March 2021 in a 1–1 draw against Faroe Islands.

== Personal life ==
Born in Moldova, Postolachi moved to France at the age of two. He holds Moldovan, French and Romanian citizenship.

== Career statistics ==
=== Club ===
As of 8 November 2026

Appearances and goals by club, season and competition
Club	Season	League			National cup (Note: Includes Belgian Cup, Cupa României, Coupe de France)		Europe		Other		Total	
Club	Season	Division	Apps	Goals	Apps	Goals	Apps	Goals	Apps	Goals	Apps	Goals
Paris Saint-Germain B	2017–18	Championnat National 2	9	1	—		—		—		9	1
Paris Saint-Germain B	2018–19	Championnat National 2	27	4	—		—		—		27	4
Paris Saint-Germain B	Total		36	5	—		—		—		36	5
Lille B	2019–20	Championnat National 2	17	0	—		—		—		17	0
Mouscron	2020–21	Belgian First Division A	6	0	0	0	—		—		6	0
Mouscron	2021–22	Belgian First Division B	7	0	1	0	—		—		8	0
Mouscron	Total		13	0	1	0	—		—		14	0
Vendsyssel (loan)	2020–21	Danish 1st Division	14	0	—		—		—		14	0
UTA Arad	2022–23	Liga I	37	10	6	2	—		2 (Note: Appearances in Liga I promotion/relegation play-offs)	2	45	14
UTA Arad	2023–24	Liga I	1	0	—		—		—		1	0
UTA Arad	Total		38	10	6	2	—		2	2	46	14
Grenoble	2023–24	Ligue 2	32	3	1	1	—		—		33	4
CFR Cluj	2024–25	Liga I	31	5	6	0	1 (Note: Appearance in UEFA Conference League)	0	—		38	5
CFR Cluj	2025–26	Liga I	5	2	0	0	7 (Note: Five appearances in UEFA Europa League, two appearances in UEFA Conference League)	0	1 (Note: Appearance in Supercupa României)	0	13	2
CFR Cluj	Total		36	7	6	0	8	0	1	0	51	7
Universitatea Cluj	2025–26	Liga I	17	1	2	1	—		—		19	2
Universitatea Cluj	2026–27	Liga I	0	0	0	0	0	0	0	0	0	0
Universitatea Cluj	Total		17	1	2	1	0	0	0	0	19	2
Brisbane Roar	2026–27	A-League Men	3	0	0	0	—		—		3	0
Career total			206	26	16	4	8	0	3	2	233	32

=== International ===
As of match played 9 June 2026

Appearances and goals by national team and year
National team	Year	Apps	Goals
Moldova	2021	1	0
Moldova	2022	6	0
Moldova	2023	10	0
Moldova	2024	8	1
Moldova	2025	10	0
Moldova	2026	2	0
Total		37	1

Scores and results list Moldova's goal tally first, score column indicates score after each Postolachi goal.

List of international goals scored by Virgiliu Postolachi
No.	Date	Venue	Opponent	Score	Result	Competition
1	16 November 2024	Estadi Nacional, Andorra la Vella, Andorra	Andorra	1–0	1–0	2024–25 UEFA Nations League

== Honours ==
CFR Cluj

- Cupa României: 2024–25
- Supercupa României runner-up: 2025

Universitatea Cluj

- Cupa României runner-up: 2025–26
- Supercupa României runner-up: 2026
