= Zinedine Labyad =

French footballer (born 2000)

Personal information
- Date of birth: 7 March 2000 (age 26)
- Place of birth: Charleville-Mézières, France
- Height: 1.80 m (5 ft 11 in)
- Position: Forward

Team information
- Current team: Mondercange
- Number: 10

Senior career*
| Years | Team | Apps | (Gls) |
| 2017–2018 | Troyes II | 7 | (1) |
| 2018–2019 | Celta Vigo B | 0 | (0) |
| 2019–2021 | Prix-lès-Mézières | 2 | (0) |
| 2021–2023 | Grenoble | 1 | (0) |
| 2023– | Mondercange | 0 | (0) |
- * Club domestic league appearances and goals as of 1 June 2024

Zinedine Labyad (born 7 March 2000) is a French professional footballer who plays as a forward for Mondercange.

== Club career ==
Labyad began his career with the reserves of Troyes and Celta Vigo B, and followed that with a stint with Prix-lès-Mézières. He moved to Grenoble in the summer of 2021. He made his professional debut with Grenobole in a 4–0 Ligue 2 loss to Paris FC on 24 July 2021.

== Personal life ==
Born in France, Labyad holds both French and Moroccan nationalities.
