= Château de Bouquéron =

15th-century defensive fortress in France

Coordinates: 45.2148°N 5.7574°E

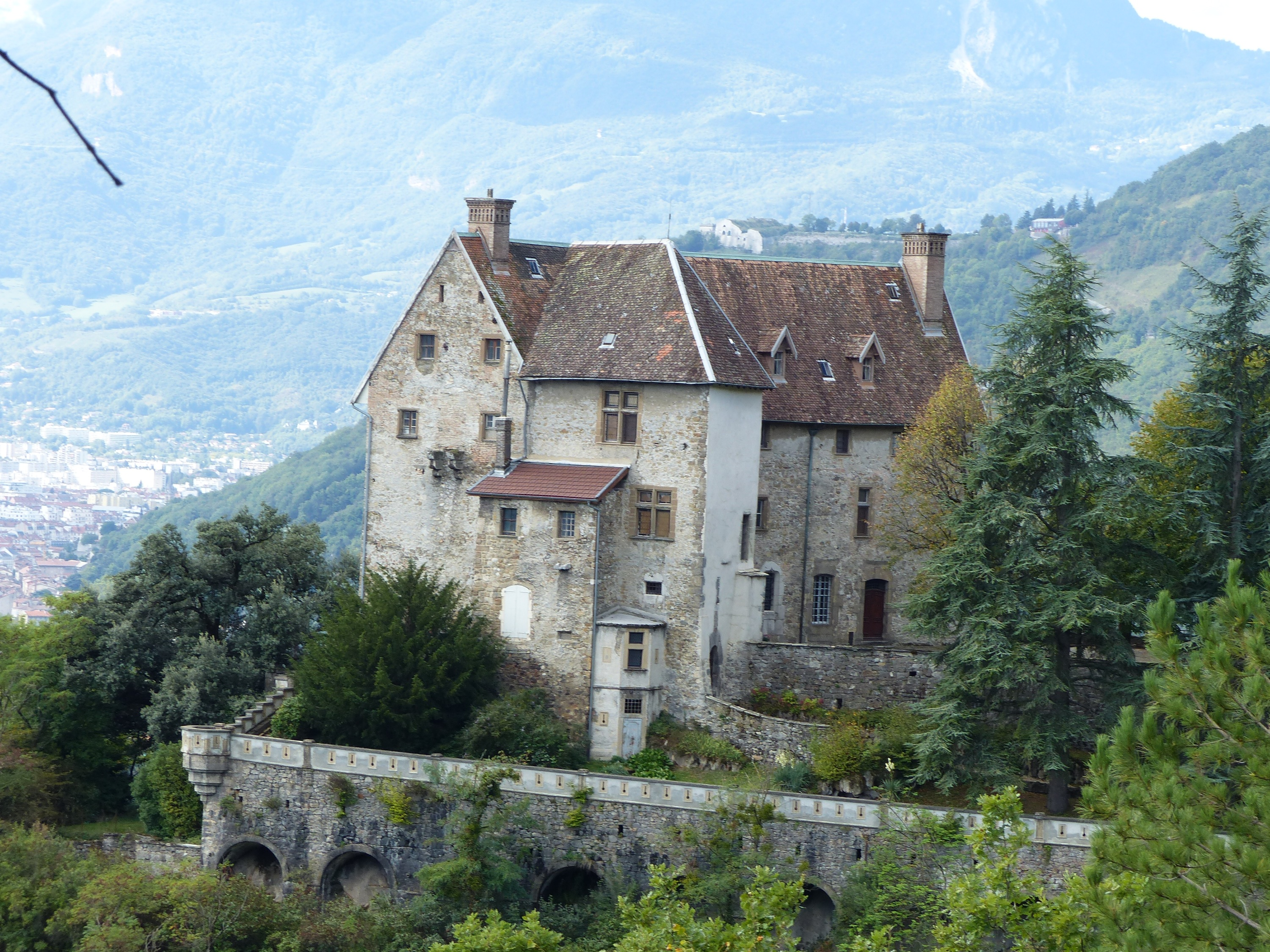

The Château de Bouquéron is a 15th-century defensive fortress in the commune of Corenc in the Isère département of France. It was modernised and expanded during the 17th and 18th centuries.

The facades, roof and parts of the interior have been classified as a monument historique by the French Ministry of Culture since 1988. The castle is built on a rock and surrounded by a park.

During the French Revolution, the building was sold as a national asset. In 1852, it was converted into a hydrotherapy centre. it is privately owned.

== See also ==
- List of castles in France
