= Natanael Ntolla =

French footballer (born 1999)

Personal information
- Full name: Thio Natanaël Amos Ntolla
- Date of birth: 1 July 1999 (age 27)
- Place of birth: Argenteuil, France
- Height: 1.85 m (6 ft 1 in)
- Position: Winger

Team information
- Current team: Vizela
- Number: 11

Senior career*
Years	Team	Apps	(Gls)
2018–2019	Sochaux B	23	(2)
2019–2021	Sochaux	1	(0)
2021–2023	Châteauroux	52	(6)
2023–2024	Grenoble	30	(0)
2024–	Vizela	55	(4)
- * Club domestic league appearances and goals as of 19 June 2026

Thio Natanaël Amos Ntolla (born 1 July 1999) is a French professional footballer who plays as a winger for Liga Portugal 2 club Vizela.

== Career ==
Ntolla made his professional debut with Sochaux in a 2–1 Coupe de la Ligue loss to Paris FC on 13 August 2019. On 17 January 2020, he signed his first professional contract with Sochaux.

On 17 June 2021, he signed a three-year contract with Châteauroux.

On 13 July 2023, Ntolla Thio moved to Grenoble on a three-year contract.

On 31 August 2025, he signed a two-year contract with Liga Portugal 2 club Vizela.
