= Souleymane Cissé (footballer, born 1991) =

Senegalese footballer (born 1991)

Personal information
- Date of birth: 30 July 1991 (age 35)
- Place of birth: Sédhiou, Senegal
- Height: 1.72 m (5 ft 8 in)
- Position: Midfielder

Youth career
- 2003–2008: Pikine

Senior career*
Years	Team	Apps	(Gls)
2008–2014	Pikine		
2014–2017	Al-Hilal Club		
2017–2019	El Hilal El Obeid		
2019–2020	Grenoble II	5	(0)
2020–2022	Grenoble	18	(0)
2022–2023	Hajer	13	(0)
2025–	Al-Jazira FC		
- * Club domestic league appearances and goals as of 17:35, 14 August 2022 (UTC) ‡ National team caps and goals as of 05:46, 29 July 2021 (UTC)

Souleymane Cissé (born 30 July 1991) is a Senegalese professional footballer who plays as a midfielder.

== Club career ==
Cissé began playing football with Pikine, and was a part of their senior squad from 2008 to 2014. In 2014, he moved to Sudan with Al-Hilal Club, and in 2017 to El Hilal El Obeid. After leaving Sudan due to civil unrest, he briefly returned to Pikine before signing with the reserves of Grenoble in late 2019. He joined the senior team in 2020. He made his professional debut with Grenoble in a 1–0 Ligue 2 loss to En Avant Guingamp on 26 September 2020.

23 August 2022, Cissé joined Saudi club Hajer. On 18 January 2023, Cissé was released from his contract.

== Personal life ==
Cissé is the cousin of the Senegalese footballer Moussa Djitté.
