= Saint-Félicien cheese =

French cheese

Saint-Félicien
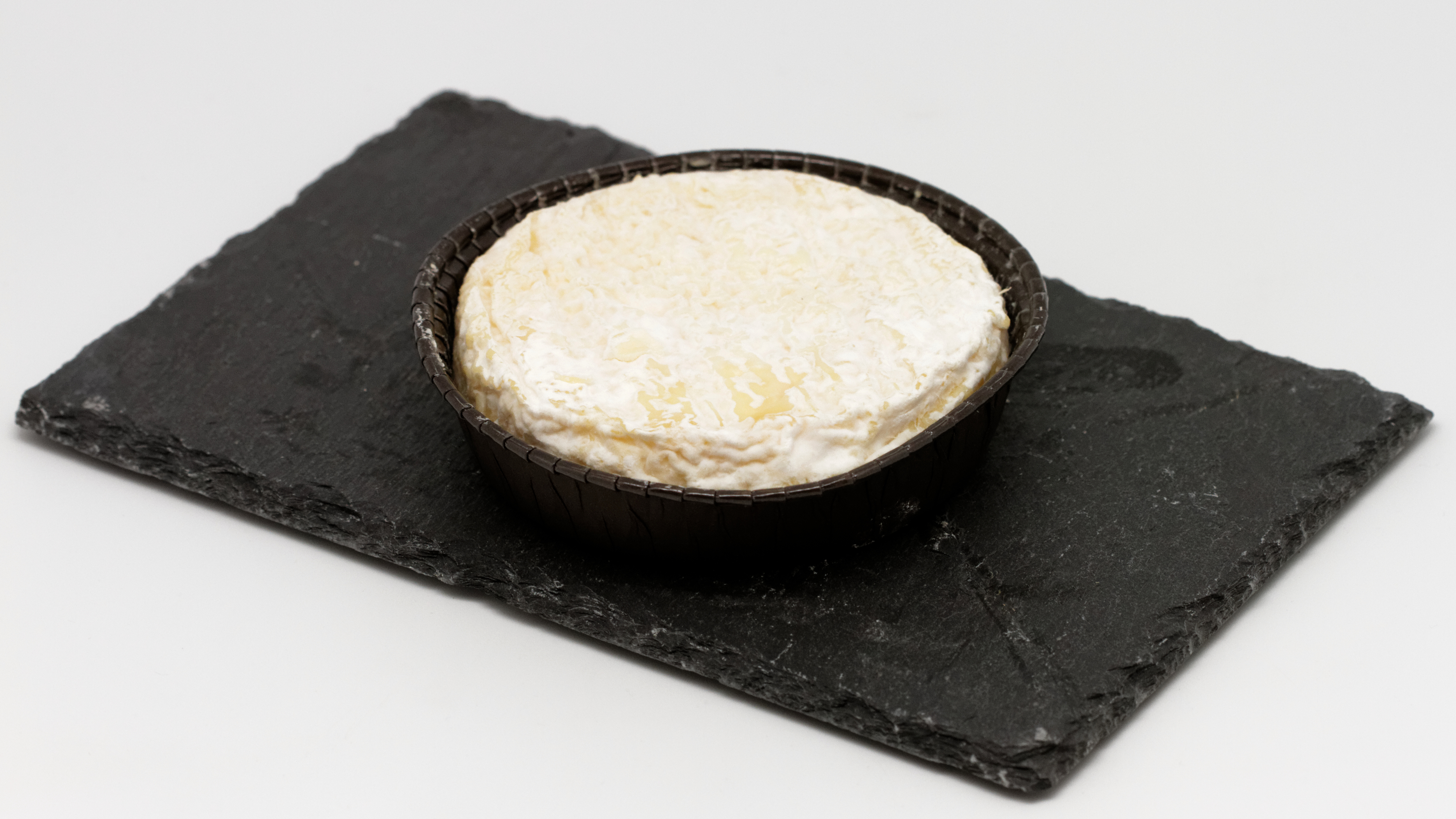
- Country of origin: France
- Region: Rhône-Alpes
- Town: Saint-Félicien
- Source of milk: cows
- Texture: creamy
- Weight: 180 grams
- Certification: Label Régional (LR)

Saint-Félicien (French pronunciation: [sɛ̃ felisjɛ̃]) is a cow's milk cheese produced in the Rhône-Alpes region of France. In France, it is designated a dauphinois cheese, referring to the former French province Dauphiné where it originated. It is a close cousin of another dauphinois cheese, Saint-Marcellin, and bears a similar texture and taste, though it can be almost twice as large in diameter.

The name originates from the small town where the cheese was first produced and sold. It was originally made from goat's milk, but since then it has become more common to produce it with cow's milk. Its creamy interior is encased in a flower-style (fleurie) casing. Its average weight is 180 grams (6.3 oz).

The optimal period for flavor occurs between April and September after an aging of 4 to 6 weeks, but it is also excellent consumed between March and December. It is softer and creamier than Saint-Marcellin.

One should not confuse this cheese with the goat's milk cheese called caillé doux from Saint-Félicien, Ardèche.

== History ==
The first mention of Saint-Félicien cheese made from cow's milk dates back to November 6, 1956, when a trademark was filed at the Lyon Commercial Court by Marius Boucher, a cheese producer from Villeurbanne. Marius Boucher's cheese factory was later taken over by Antoine Fuster, who improved the cheese's production method.

In the 1960s, the promotion of Saint-Félicien through advertising campaigns, updated labeling, and the mechanization of production contributed to strengthening its reputation on the Lyon market and led to a growth in sales.

In February 1963, another trademark registration was recorded under the name "Le Saint-Félicien" (no. 10955). It was filed by Ferdinand Brun, president of the dairy industry association of Isère and head of the largest dairy in the Saint-Marcellin region ("BRUN – DUMOULIN" dairy). This registration constitutes the first documented reference to a cow's milk Saint-Félicien from Isère. The dairy sourced its milk primarily from Isère, as well as from the commune of Lamastre in Ardèche.

By the late 1970s, the Saint-Félicien market, considered promising, accounted for 70 to 80% of the production of the Fuster dairy. Having gained a strong reputation, the cheese was seen as a valuable market opportunity for producers of Saint-Marcellin, as both cheeses, made from the same cow's milk and using similar production methods, were well received by consumers in the Lyon region.

After the World War II, the number of dairies in Lyon, already reduced, continued to decline due to the process of deindustrialization of the city center in favor of the outskirts. The introduction of European hygiene regulations further complicated the situation. This context opened the market to dairies from Isère, which began to produce their own Saint-Félicien. Following a series of legal disputes, the name Saint-Félicien was no longer protected by a registered trademark.

At the same time, several dairies promoted Saint-Félicien as a flagship product, contributing to its growing popularity beyond the Lyon market. Dairies in Isère and Drôme gained prominence, while those in Rhône struggled to compete and gradually disappeared. In Isère, the production of small-format soft cheeses had already been widespread before the 19th century, particularly in the plains and hills. This historical background likely facilitated the expansion of Saint-Félicien beyond the Lyon region.

In an official decree listing the majority of French cheeses, the "Saint-Félicien" is identified in the category of "soft cheeses," made from "cow's milk." This is specified in Decree No. 2007-628 of 27 April 2007 relating to cheeses and cheese specialties.

On 4 September 2023, the C2MF (or Committee for Saint-Marcellin PGI and Saint-Félicien) submitted a request to the INAO for the recognition of this cheese as a Indication géographique protégée (Protected Geographical Indication).

This initiative began in 2017, driven by milk producers from the relevant area (Drôme, Isère, Rhône, Ain, Savoie, and Ardèche).
