= Saint-Marcellin =

Soft French cheese made from cow's milk

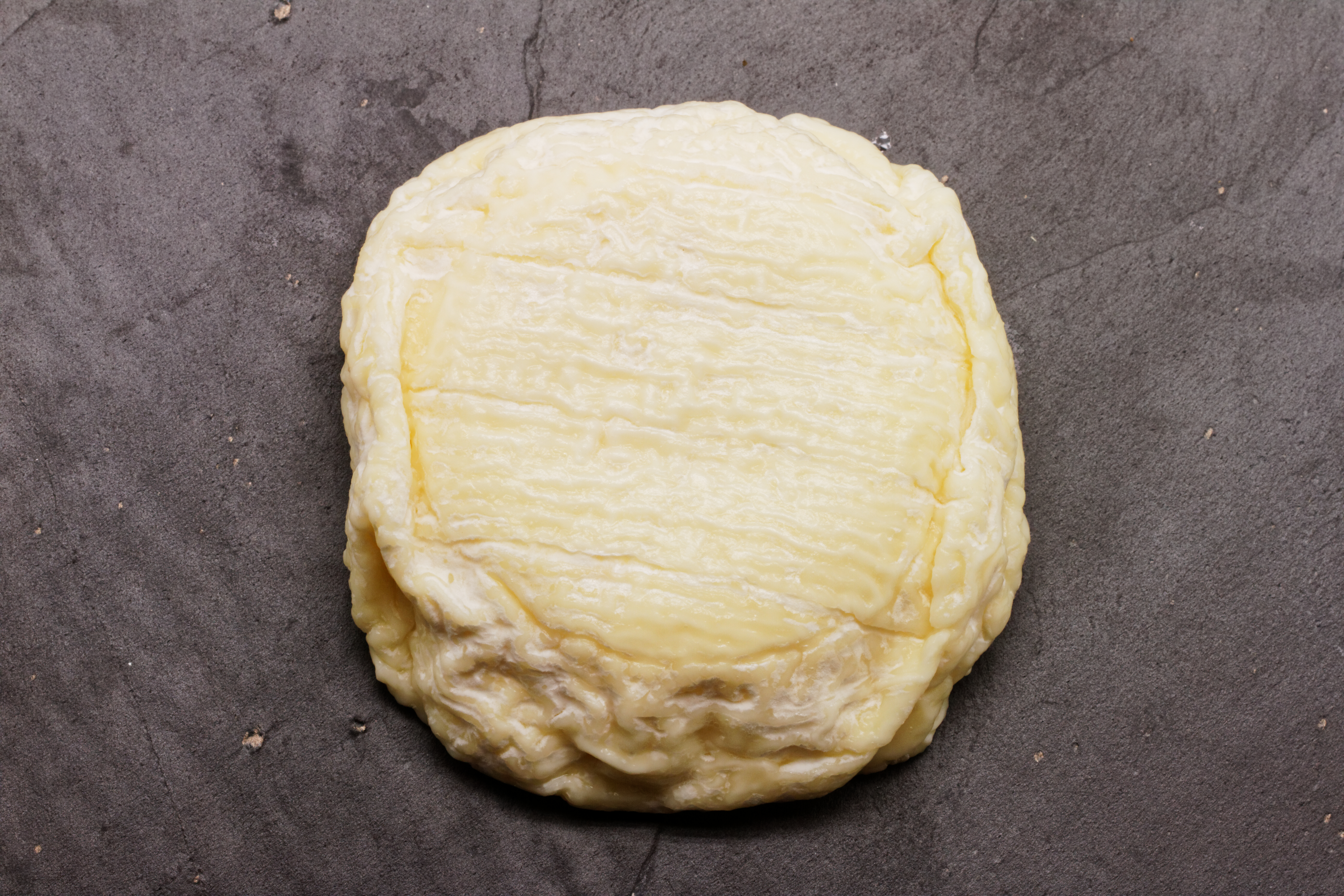
- Country of origin: France
- Region, town: Isère, Rhone-Alpes
- Source of milk: cows
- Texture: creamy
- Fat content: 50%
- Certification: PGI (Nov. 2013)
- Named after: Saint-Marcellin

Saint-Marcellin (French pronunciation: [sɛ̃ maʁsəlɛ̃]) is a soft French cheese made from cow's milk. Named after the small town of Saint-Marcellin (Isère), it is produced in a geographical area corresponding to part of the former Dauphiné province (now included in the Rhône-Alpes région). It is generally small in size, weighing about 80 grams (50% fat), with a mottled creamy-white exterior. The degree of runniness increases with age as the exterior gains blue, then yellow, hues within two to three weeks after production.

It is similar in texture and taste to Saint-Félicien, a larger cheese produced in a different part of the Rhône-Alpes région.

Saint-Marcellin is available in three degrees of ripening (affinage): sec, crémeux and bleu.

When Saint-Marcellin is cured in marc brandy for a month or more, it is called Arômes au Gène de Marc. If cured in white wine, it becomes Arômes de Lyon.

== History ==
The earliest mentions of Saint-Marcellin cheese appear in the account books of the household of King Louis XI, indicating its presence at the royal tables of Plessis-lès-Tours and the Louvre from 1461 onwards. It is possible that he had already consumed it at the Château de Bouquéron and introduced it to Louise of Savoy during their engagement at the Château de La Côte-Saint-André.

According to legend, in 1445, the future King Louis XI—then Dauphin of Viennois—was saved from a bear by two woodcutters while hunting in the Vercors region. The woodcutters later invited him to share a meal, during which he discovered the local cheese.

The Casimir-Perier family, originally from the Dauphiné region, also contributed to the cheese’s reputation. Auguste Casimir-Perier is said to have tasted a piece of the cheese at the Beaucroissant fair in 1863 and exclaimed, “This is delicious—please have it delivered to the château every week.” Later, his son Jean Casimir-Perier, President of the French Republic, reportedly lamented not being able to enjoy his favorite cheese from Dauphiné at the proper stage of ripeness.

Before the 19th century, the production of small-format soft cheeses was widespread in the plains and hilly areas of what is now the Isère department, and was largely limited to domestic consumption. These small tommes were soft-ripened with a bloomy rind when aged, or referred to as séchons when dried. Precise documentary evidence begins to appear with the growth of commercial trade. The name “Saint-Marcellin” only came into regular use in the 19th century.

During that century, the development of transportation networks, improvements in transport methods, and increased demand for food products in nearby cities such as Romans, Grenoble, Lyon, and Bourgoin-Jallieu supported the growth of distribution channels, initially managed by coquetiers (traders who bought farm products—eggs, kid goats, cheeses, rabbits, etc.—to sell at markets), and later by the establishment of several creameries.

At the beginning of the 20th century, production of Saint-Marcellin shifted from farmhouse to dairy-based methods. Around the 1980s, production also transitioned from mixed goat and cow’s milk to exclusively cow’s milk.
