= Jessy Benet =

French footballer (born 1995)

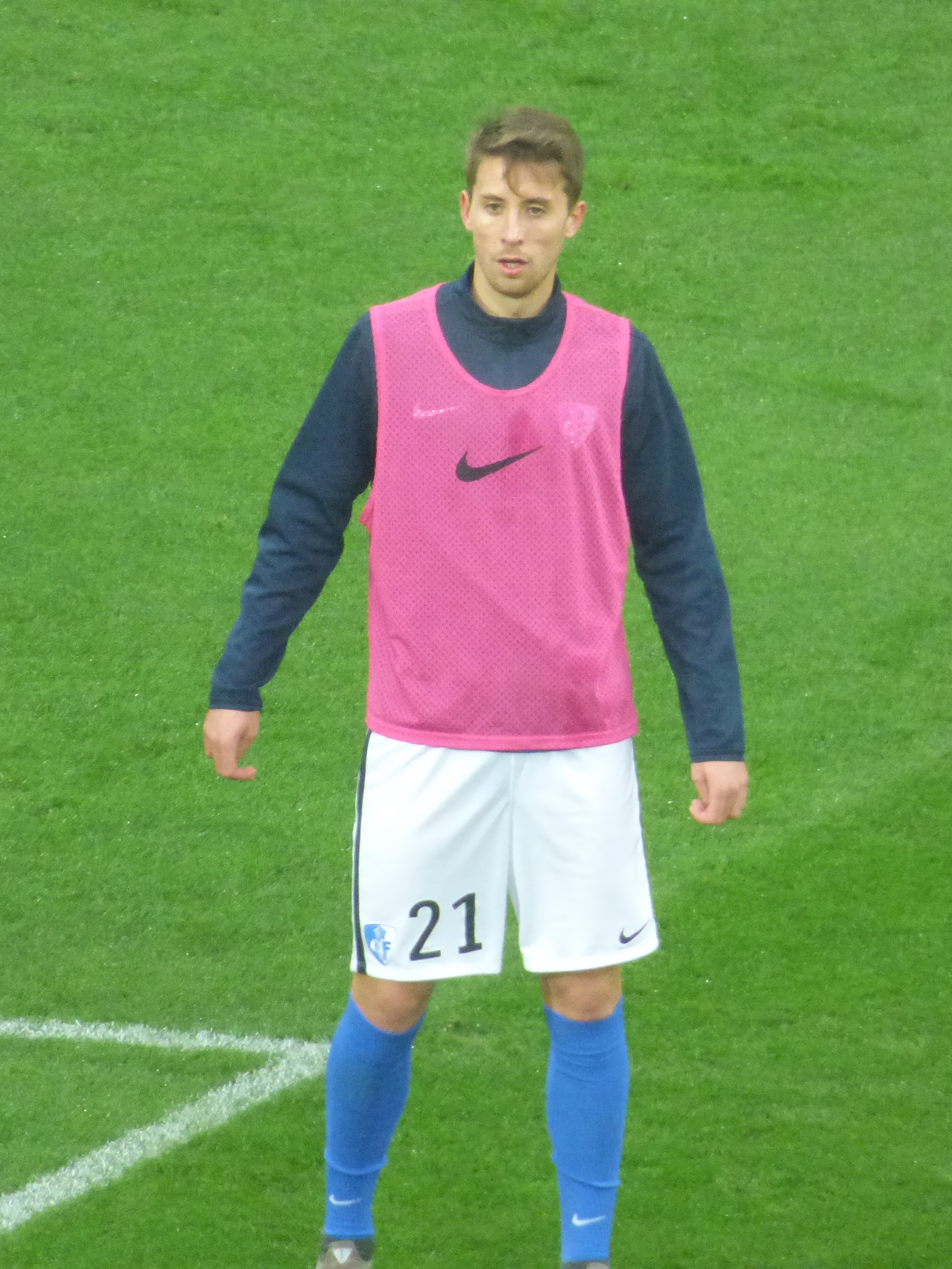
- Benet in 2018

Personal information
- Date of birth: 24 June 1995 (age 31)
- Place of birth: Le Creusot, France
- Height: 1.86 m (6 ft 1 in)
- Position: Midfielder

Team information
- Current team: Pau

Youth career
- 2001–2003: FC de la Marolle
- 2003–2004: ES de Torcy
- 2004–2008: US Saint Serninoise
- 2008–2012: Montceau

Senior career*
Years	Team	Apps	(Gls)
2012–2014	Montceau	40	(6)
2014–2018	Dijon	16	(0)
2014–2018	Dijon B	25	(8)
2016–2017	→ Avranches (loan)	30	(2)
2017–2018	→ Grenoble (loan)	25	(3)
2018–2021	Grenoble	76	(16)
2021–2023	Amiens	45	(1)
2023–2026	Grenoble	107	(23)
2026–	Pau	0	(0)

International career^{‡}
2014	France U20	2	(1)
- * Club domestic league appearances and goals as of 12 May 2026 ‡ National team caps and goals as of 19:59, 7 April 2019 (UTC)

Jessy Benet (born 24 June 1995) is a French professional footballer who plays as a midfielder for Ligue 2 club Pau.

== Club career ==
After playing for Montceau during the latter stages of his youth development, Benet made his debut for the club on 20 October 2012, coming on as an 80th minute substitute in a 4–0 loss away to Mulhouse. During his first season playing for Montceau in the Championnat National 2, Benet made 21 league appearances, scoring his first senior goal in a 3–0 home victory against Paris Saint-Germain II on 4 May 2013. The following season, Bénet made 19 league appearances, scoring five times for Montceau, as the club finished 14th.

Ahead of the 2014–15 Ligue 2 season, Benet signed for Dijon. In his first season at the club, Benet made eight league appearances for Dijon, starting four times, as well as appearing six times for Dijon's reserves in the Championnat National 3, scoring three times. In 2015–16, Benet fell further out of favour at Dijon, playing just 98 minutes of football across eight league games; being primarily used in the National 3 for Dijon B. On 30 June 2016, Benet was loaned out to Championnat National side Avranches, making 35 appearances across all competitions, scoring three times. Despite battling relegation for the majority of the season, during his time at Avranches, Benet was part of the side that reached the quarter-finals of the Coupe de France. On 30 August 2018, Benet was once again loaned out, this time to Grenoble. Benet made 25 league appearances for Grenoble, scoring three times, as the club won promotion back to Ligue 2.

In June 2018, Benet signed for Grenoble on a permanent basis on a three-year contract. After finishing ninth in Ligue 2 for two consecutive seasons, Grenoble finished fourth in the 2020–21 season, with Benet contributing nine goals and seven assists in his self proclaimed "best season professionally", qualifying for the promotion play-offs, eventually losing to Toulouse in the second round.

On 7 September 2021, following the expiry of his contract with Grenoble, he signed a three-year contract with Amiens.

On 13 January 2023, Benet returned to Grenoble.

== International career ==
In October 2014, Benet made two appearances for France's under-20's in a double header against the Czech Republic, scoring on his second appearance on 9 October 2014, two days after making his debut.
