= Franck-Yves Bambock =

French footballer (born 1995)

Franck Bambock
Personal information
- Full name: Franck-Yves Bambock
- Date of birth: 7 April 1995 (age 31)
- Place of birth: Douala, Cameroon
- Height: 1.81 m (5 ft 11 in)
- Position: Defensive midfielder

Team information
- Current team: Gloria Bistrița
- Number: 76

Youth career
- 2004–2008: Antony Sport
- 2008–2014: Paris Saint-Germain

Senior career*
Years	Team	Apps	(Gls)
2013–2015	Paris Saint-Germain B	48	(1)
2015–2017	Huesca	47	(0)
2017–2018	Sparta Rotterdam	1	(0)
2017–2018	Jong Sparta Rotterdam	5	(1)
2018	Córdoba B	2	(0)
2018–2019	Córdoba	7	(1)
2019	Maccabi Petah Tikva	11	(0)
2019–2021	Marítimo	53	(2)
2021–2023	Grenoble	60	(1)
2023–2024	Fehérvár	2	(0)
2024	→ Panetolikos (loan)	1	(0)
2024–2025	AEL Limassol	5	(0)
2025	→ Gareji (loan)	14	(0)
2025–	Gloria Bistrița	7	(0)

International career
2010–2011	France U16	11	(2)
2012	France U17	7	(0)
2013	France U18	2	(0)
- * Club domestic league appearances and goals as of 22 November 2025

Franck-Yves Bambock (born 7 April 1995) is a professional footballer who plays as a defensive midfielder for Liga II club Gloria Bistrița.

== Career ==
Born in Douala, Bambock moved to France at early age, and joined Paris Saint-Germain's youth setup in 2008 at the age of 13, after starting it out at Antony Sport. He made his senior debuts with the reserves in 2013, in Championnat de France amateur.

On 16 July 2015 Bambock moved abroad for the first time in his career, signing a two-year deal with Spanish Segunda División side SD Huesca. He made his professional debut on 22 August, coming on as a second-half substitute for Iñigo Ros in a 2–3 home loss against Deportivo Alavés.

On 12 July 2017, Bambock signed a one-year deal with Eredivisie side Sparta Rotterdam. After appearing rarely and mainly for the B-side, he cut ties with the club the following February.

On 1 February 2018, Bambock returned to Spain and its second level after signing for Córdoba CF, but registration problems meant he could not feature for the side during the remainder of the season. He was finally included in the B-team in Segunda División B in April, being only registered to the first-team on 16 August.

On 18 January 2019, Bambock terminated his contract with the Blanquiverdes, and joined Israeli side Maccabi Petah Tikva FC four days later.

On 21 June 2019, Bambock signed a contract with Marítimo.

On 12 August 2021, he joined Grenoble on a two-year contract.

On 21 June 2023, it was announced that Bambock signed a contract with OTP Bank Liga club Fehérvár. He will play in jersey number 6, and signed a contract until 30 June 2025. In January 2024, he joined Super League Greece club Panetolikos on loan for the remainder of the season.
