= Amine Sbaï =

Moroccan footballer (born 2000)

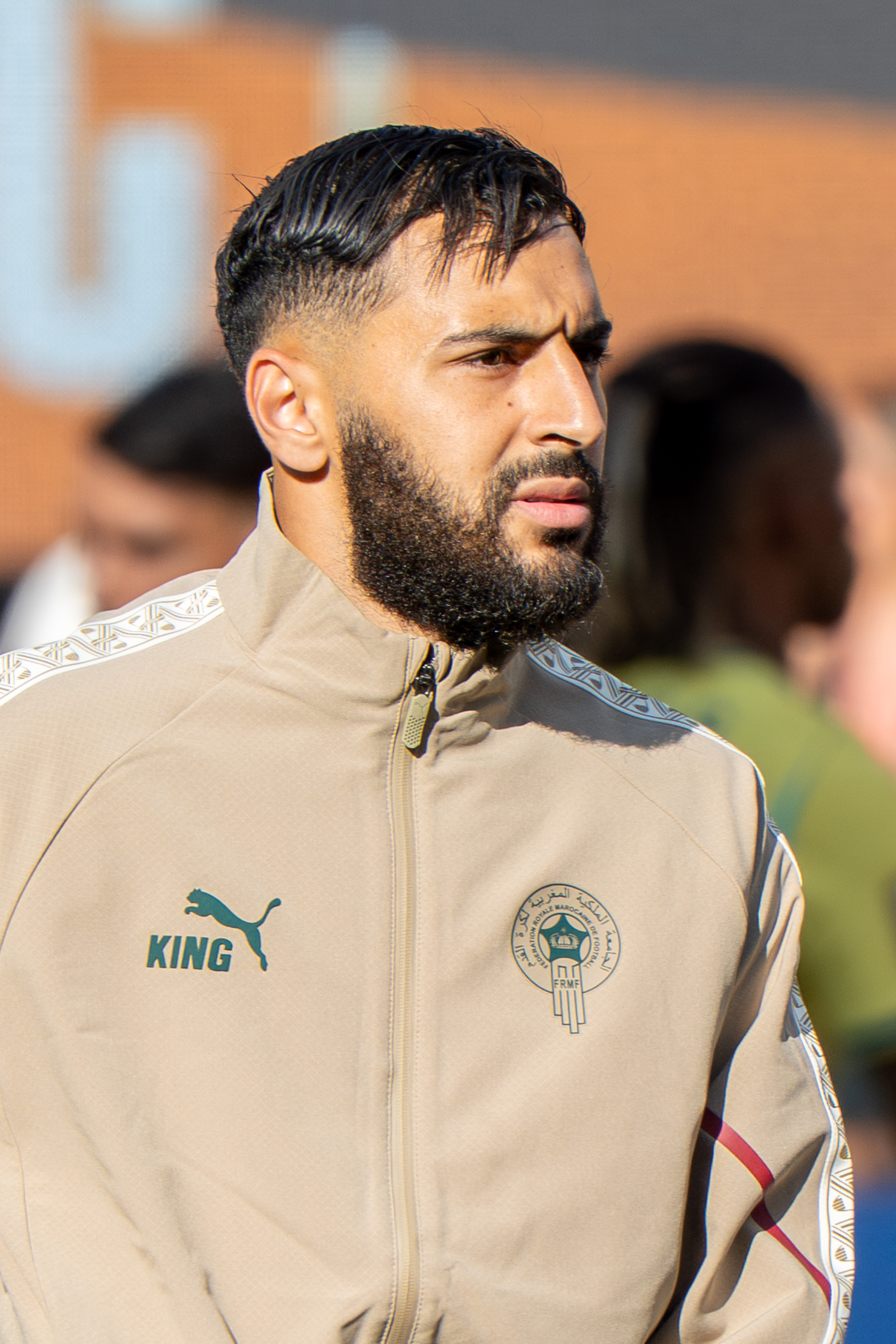
- Sbai with Morocco in 2026

Personal information
- Full name: Mohamed Amine Sbaï
- Date of birth: 5 November 2000 (age 26)
- Place of birth: Sidi Kacem, Morocco
- Height: 1.75 m (5 ft 9 in)
- Position: Winger

Team information
- Current team: Angers
- Number: 7

Youth career
- 2007–2017: Nîmes
- 2017–2018: EP Vergèze
- 2018–2019: Le Crès

Senior career*
Years	Team	Apps	(Gls)
2019–2021	Alès	21	(10)
2021–2022	Sète	29	(6)
2022–2024	Grenoble	61	(6)
2024–2025	Al-Fateh	21	(5)
2025–	Angers	25	(3)

International career^{‡}
2026–	Morocco	3	(0)
- * Club domestic league appearances and goals as of 20 May 2026 ‡ National team caps and goals as of 22:22, 9 July 2026 (UTC)

Mohamed Amine Sbaï (born 5 November 2000) is a Moroccan professional footballer who plays as a winger for Ligue 1 club Angers and the Morocco national team.

== Club career ==
Sbaï is a youth product of Nîmes, EP Vergèze and Le Crès. He began his senior career with Alès in 2019. He finished as top scorer of the shortened 2020–21 Championnat National 3 season with 9 goals. For the 2021–22 season, he transferred to Sète where he scored 6 goals in 29 appearances. He transferred to the Ligue 2 club Grenobole on 25 May 2022.

On 30 August 2024, Sbaï joined Saudi Pro League club Al-Fateh on a two-year contract.

== International career ==
Sbaï was called up to the Morocco national team for a set of friendlies in May 2026. He was not initially part of the national squad for the 2026 FIFA World Cup but on 11 June 2026 he was called up to replace an injured Abde Ezzalzouli.

== Personal life ==
Born in Morocco. He holds both French and Moroccan nationalities. His brothers, Salaheddine and Hatim Sbaï are also professional footballers.
