= Mamadou Diop (footballer) =

Mauritanian footballer (born 2000)

Personal information
- Date of birth: 3 January 2000 (age 26)
- Place of birth: Guédiawaye, Senegal
- Height: 2.04 m (6 ft 8 in)
- Position: Goalkeeper

Team information
- Current team: Auxerre
- Number: 23

Senior career*
Years	Team	Apps	(Gls)
2019	Istres	1	(0)
2019–2021	Gueugnon	3	(0)
2021–2022	Chambly	9	(0)
2022–2026	Grenoble	61	(0)
2026–	Auxerre	0	(0)

International career^{‡}
2024–	Mauritania	5	(0)
- * Club domestic league appearances and goals as of 12 May 2026 ‡ National team caps and goals as of 1 April 2026

Mamadou Diop (born 3 January 2000) is a professional footballer who plays as a goalkeeper for Ligue 1 club Auxerre. Born in Senegal, he plays for the Mauritania national team.

== Career ==
Diop began his senior career in the Championnat National 3 with Istres in 2019. On 5 July 2019 he moved to Gueugnon, again in the fifth division where he was the backup goalkeeper. In 2021, he moved to Chambly in the Championnat National. He moved to Ligue 2 side Grenoble on 19 July 2022, signing his first professional contract. On 10 August 2023, he extended his contract with Grenoble until 2026.

On 6 July 2026, Diop joined Auxerre in Ligue 1 on a four-season deal.

== International career ==
Born in Senegal, Diop is of Mauritanian descent and holds dual-citizenship. He was called up to the Mauritania national football team for a set of 2026 FIFA World Cup qualification matches in March 2025.
