= Jekob Jeno =

New Caledonian footballer (born 2000)

Personal information
- Full name: Jekob Abiezer Malacki Jeno
- Date of birth: 22 June 2000 (age 26)
- Place of birth: Nouméa, New Caledonia
- Height: 1.83 m (6 ft 0 in)
- Position: Midfielder

Team information
- Current team: Hapoel Rishon LeZion
- Number: 8

Youth career
- –2018: Dumbéa
- 2018–2019: Amiens

Senior career*
Years	Team	Apps	(Gls)
2019–2020	Amiens II		
2020–2021	AC Amiens	3	(0)
2021–2024	Grenoble	41	(0)
2024–2025	Beitar Jerusalem	19	(2)
2025	Unirea Slobozia	10	(0)
2026–	Hapoel Rishon LeZion	14	(0)

International career^{‡}
2017	New Caledonia U17	16	(4)
2019–	New Caledonia	7	(0)
Medal record
Representing New Caledonia
Men's football
OFC U-17 Championship
Runner-up	2017 Samoa/Tahiti
- * Club domestic league appearances and goals as of 24 June 2026 ‡ National team caps and goals as of 8 October 2025

Jekob Abiezer Malacki Jeno (born 22 June 2000) is a New Caledonian professional footballer who plays as a midfielder for Hapoel Rishon LeZion and the New Caledonia national team.

== Career ==
Jeno joined the Amiens youth academy in 2018 on a one-year contract, following a trial. He spent a second year with the club's reserves.

He moved to Grenoble in 2021 after trialling. At the time, he became three third footballer trained in New Caledonia to sign for a top-level metropolitan club, after Georges Gope-Fenepej and César Zeoula. He made his professional debut in Ligue 2 on 8 January, in a 1–0 loss against Auxerre, replacing teammate Florian Michel after an hour.

== Career statistics ==
As of matches played on 8 October 2025

Appearances and goals by national team and year
National team	Year	Apps	Goals
New Caledonia	2019	2	0
New Caledonia	2024	2	0
New Caledonia	2025	3	0
Total		17	0
