= Arial Mendy =

Senegalese footballer

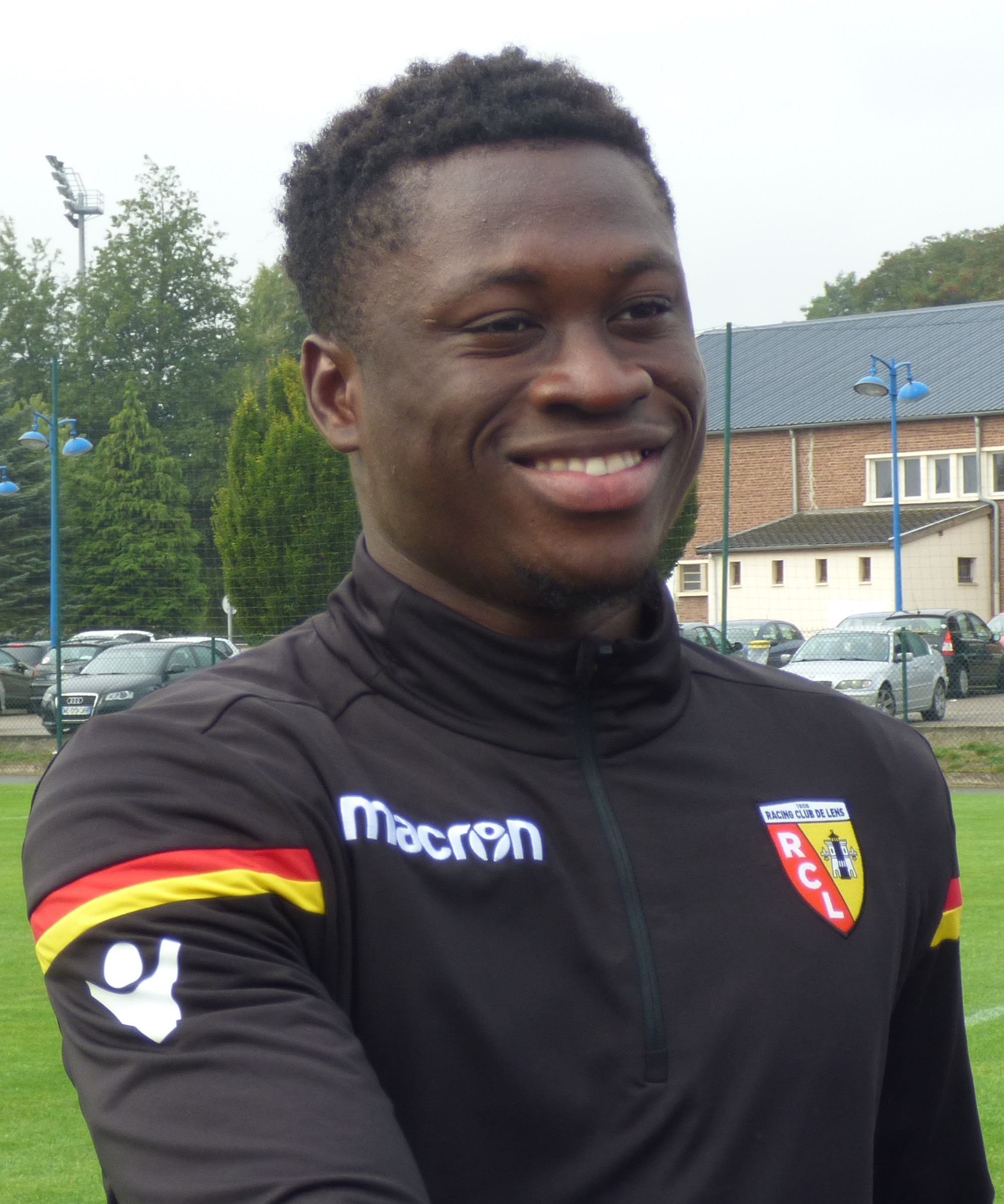
- Mendy with Lens in 2018

Personal information
- Full name: Arial Benabent Mendy
- Date of birth: 7 November 1994 (age 32)
- Place of birth: Ziguinchor, Senegal
- Height: 1.80 m (5 ft 11 in)
- Position: Left-back

Team information
- Current team: F.C. Ashdod (on loan from Beitar Jerusalem)
- Number: 94

Youth career
- 2009–2013: Diambars FC

Senior career*
Years	Team	Apps	(Gls)
2013–2018	Diambars FC		
2018–2020	Lens	25	(0)
2020	→ Orléans (loan)	8	(1)
2020–2021	Servette	23	(0)
2021–2023	Clermont Foot	23	(0)
2022–2023	Clermont Foot II	2	(0)
2023–2025	Grenoble	46	(0)
2025–	Beitar Jerusalem	8	(0)
2026–	→ F.C. Ashdod (loan)	10	(1)

International career^{‡}
2017–	Senegal	4	(0)
- * Club domestic league appearances and goals as of 24 June 2026 ‡ National team caps and goals as of 31 August 2020

Arial Benabent Mendy (born 7 November 1994) is a Senegalese professional footballer who plays as a left-back for Israeli Premier League club Hapoel Haifa.

== Career ==
In 2017, while playing for Diambars FC, Mendy was capped for Senegal. He made his professional debut with RC Lens in a 2–0 Ligue 2 win over US Orléans on 27 July 2018.

On 7 August 2020, Mendy joined Swiss Super League club Servette FC.

He joined French club Clermont Foot in July 2021.

In January 2023, Mendy joined Grenoble on a two-and-a-half-year deal having agreed to the mutual termination of his Clermont contract.
