= Mamadou Diarra (footballer, born 1997) =

Senegalese footballer

Personal information
- Date of birth: 20 December 1997 (age 28)
- Place of birth: Dakar, Senegal
- Height: 1.84 m (6 ft 0 in)
- Position: Centre-back

Youth career
- ASC Jaraaf

Senior career*
| Years | Team | Apps | (Gls) |
| 2016–2019 | Boluspor | 49 | (4) |
| 2019–2020 | Bursaspor | 22 | (2) |
| 2020–2022 | Giresunspor | 54 | (2) |
| 2022–2025 | Grenoble | 82 | (4) |
| 2025–2026 | Selangor | 13 | (1) |

International career
| 2017 | Senegal U20 | 10 | (0) |
- * Club domestic league appearances and goals as of 27 June 2026

Mamadou Diarra (born 20 December 1997) is a Senegalese professional footballer who plays as a centre-back. He is currently a free agent.

== Club career ==
A youth product of the Senegalese club ASC Jaraaf, Diarra began his senior career with the Turkish club Boluspor. After a stint with Bursaspor, he transferred to Giresunspor in on 30 August 2020. He made his professional debut with Giresunspor in a 1–0 Süper Lig loss to Alanyaspor on 13 September 2021.

On 1 September 2022, Diarra signed a three-year contract with Grenoble in French Ligue 2.

== International career ==
Diarra is a youth international for Senegal, having captained the Senegal U20s in 2017.
