= Saikou Touray =

Gambian footballer

Personal information
- Date of birth: 6 June 2000 (age 26)
- Place of birth: Tujereng, Gambia
- Height: 1.75 m (5 ft 9 in)
- Position: Midfielder

Team information
- Current team: KuPS
- Number: 22

Youth career
- 2016–2019: Superstars Academy FC
- 2018–2019: → Beitar Netanya (loan)

Senior career*
Years	Team	Apps	(Gls)
2019–2022	Maccabi Haifa	2	(0)
2019–2020	→ Sektzia Ness Ziona (loan)	23	(2)
2020–2021	→ Ironi Kiryat Shmona (loan)	28	(0)
2021–2022	→ Hapoel Haifa (loan)	24	(0)
2022–2025	Grenoble	61	(2)
2025–2026	Bourg-Péronnas	13	(0)
2026–	KuPS	11	(0)

International career^{‡}
2025–	Gambia	1	(0)
- * Club domestic league appearances and goals as of 12 November 2026 ‡ National team caps and goals as of 18:47, 12 June 2025 (UTC)

Saikou Touray (born 6 June 2000) is a Gambian professional footballer who plays as a midfielder for Finnish Veikkausliiga club KuPS and the Gambia national team.

== Career ==
Touray is a youth product of the Gambian club Superstars Academy FC, and first moved to Israel on loan with Beitar Netanya in 2018. On 12 May 2019, he signed his first professional contract with Maccabi Haifa for five seasons. He had successive loans with Sektzia Ness Ziona, Ironi Kiryat Shmona, and Hapoel Haifa. On 19 July 2022, he transferred to the French Ligue 2 club Grenoble.

On 18 June 2026, Touray signed with the Finnish champions KuPS until the end of 2027.

== International career ==
Jatta was called up to the Gambia national team for a set of 2026 FIFA World Cup qualification matches in June 2025.
