= Loris Néry =

French footballer (born 1991)

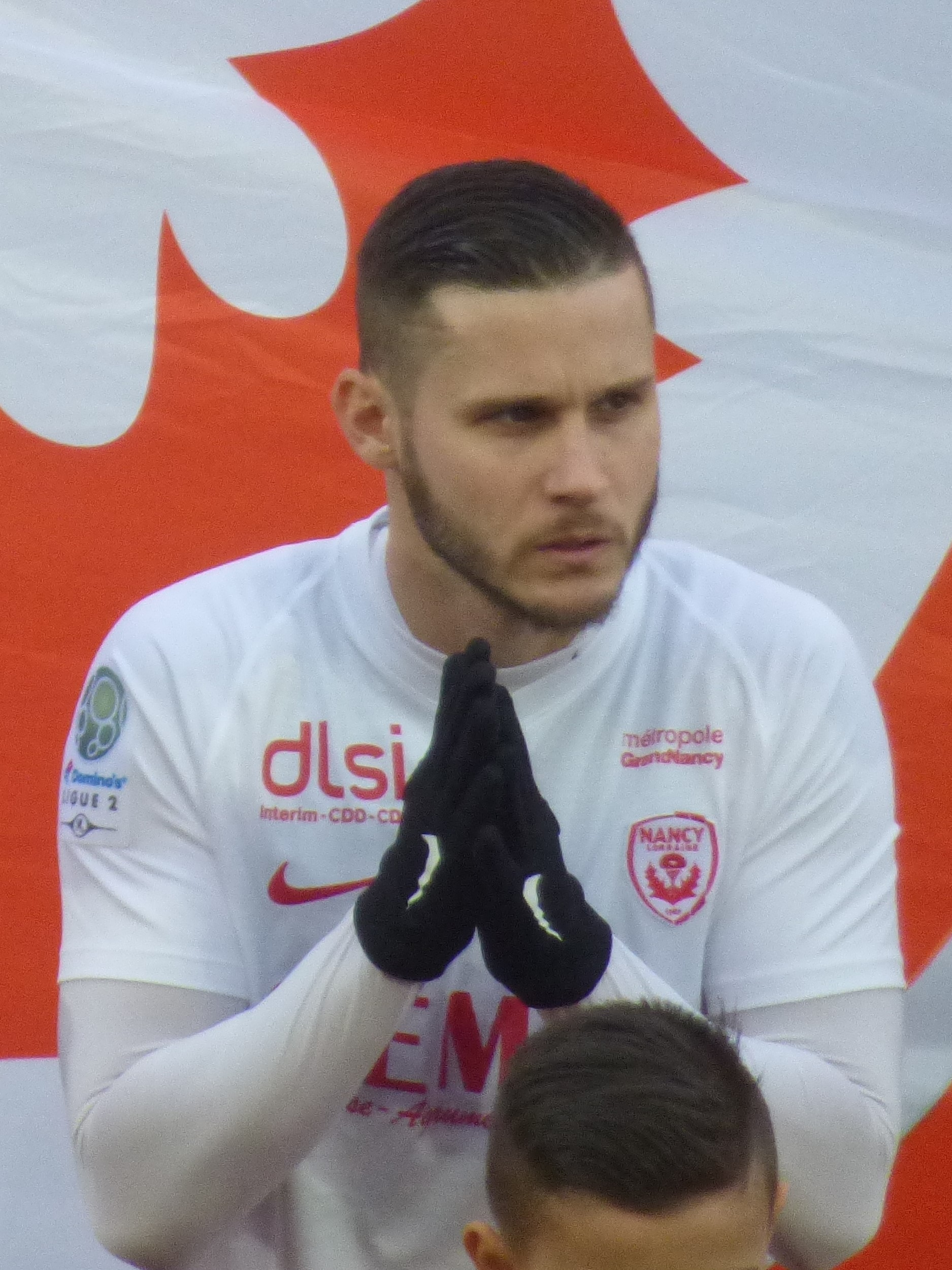
- Néry in 2019

Personal information
- Date of birth: 5 February 1991 (age 35)
- Place of birth: Saint-Étienne, France
- Height: 1.80 m (5 ft 11 in)
- Position: Defender

Youth career
- 1999–2010: Saint-Étienne

Senior career*
Years	Team	Apps	(Gls)
2010–2011	Saint-Étienne II	23	(0)
2010–2012	Saint-Étienne	23	(0)
2012–2016	Valenciennes II	14	(0)
2012–2018	Valenciennes	132	(2)
2018–2019	Nancy II	5	(0)
2018–2020	Nancy	33	(0)
2020–2023	Grenoble	46	(1)

International career
2006	France U16	1	(0)
2010–2011	France U20	3	(0)
2011–2012	France U21	6	(0)
- * Club domestic league appearances and goals

Loris Néry (born 5 February 1991) is a French former professional footballer who played as a defender or anywhere along the back line.

== Career ==
Néry was born in Saint-Étienne. On 23 August 2010, signed his first professional contract with Saint-Étienne after agreeing to a three-year deal. He made his professional debut on 22 September in a Coupe de la Ligue match against Nice. Néry started and played the entire match in a 2–0 win. In 2010, he began representing France internationally with the under-21 team.

In June 2012, Néry agreed a move to Valenciennes FC on a four-year contract. The transfer fee paid to Saint-Étienne was estimated at €800,000.

Néry announced his retirement from playing in October 2023.
