= Mathys Tourraine =

Moroccan footballer (born 2001)

Personal information
- Date of birth: 14 January 2001 (age 25)
- Place of birth: Lyon, France
- Height: 1.72 m (5 ft 8 in)
- Position: Right-back

Team information
- Current team: Pau

Youth career
- 2016–2020: Monaco
- 2021: Poissy
- 2022: Grenoble

Senior career*
Years	Team	Apps	(Gls)
2023–2024	Grenoble	43	(1)
2024–2026	Paris FC	29	(0)
2025–2026	→ Rodez (loan)	10	(0)
2026	→ Clermont (loan)	6	(0)
2026–	Pau	0	(0)

International career^{‡}
2023	Morocco U23	5	(0)
- * Club domestic league appearances and goals as of 12 May 2026 ‡ National team caps and goals as of 23:02, 25 November 2023 (UTC)

Mathys Tourraine (born 14 January 2001) is a professional footballer who plays as right-back for Ligue 2 club Pau. Born in France, he is a youth international for Morocco.

== Club career ==
=== Early career ===
Born in Lyon, Tourraine joined the youth system of Monaco in 2016. He was released by Monaco in 2020.

On 3 February 2021, after a year of not playing football, Tourraine was signed by Poissy.

=== Grenoble ===
On 13 July 2022, after another year without playing football, Tourraine signed a contract with Grenoble's reserves. On 30 March 2023, he signed his professional contract with Grenoble. He made his debut for the club in a 1–0 league defeat to Dijon, coming on as a late substitute in the 80th minute. Tourraine scored his first goal for the club in a 2–0 win over Paris FC.

=== Paris FC ===
On 29 June 2024, Paris FC announced the signing of Tourraine on a three-year deal.

On 30 August 2025, Tourraine was loaned by Rodez in Ligue 2 for the 2025–26 season. On 14 January 2026, he moved on a new loan to Clermont, also in Ligue 2.

=== Pau FC ===
On July 30, 2026, Tourraine joined Ligue 2 side Pau FC on a two-year deal.

== International career ==
Born in France, Tourraine is of Moroccan descent through his mother. He was called up to the Morocco U23s in September 2023.
