= Loïc Nestor =

Guadeloupean footballer (born 1989)

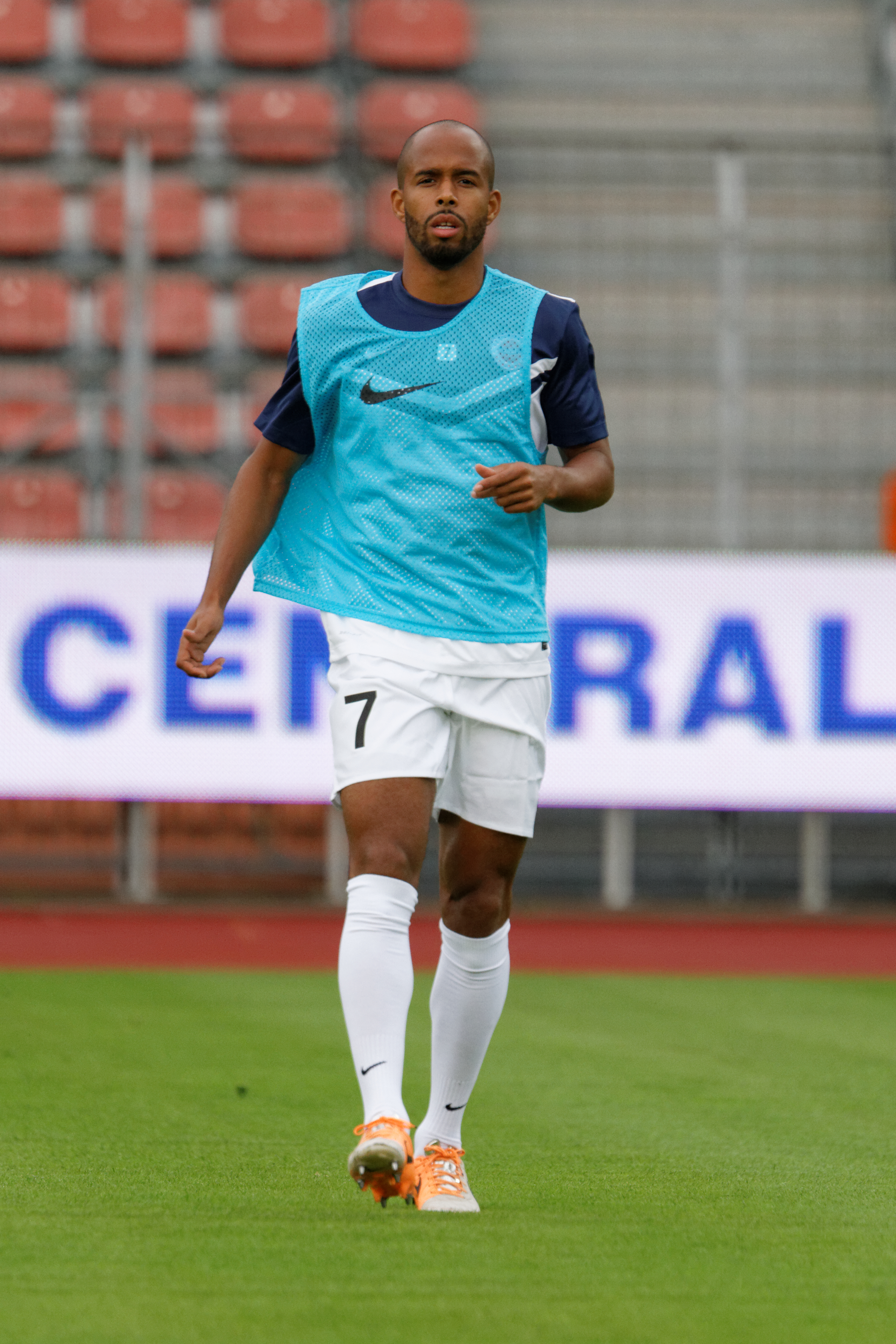
- Nestor in 2014

Personal information
- Full name: Loïc Duvart Nestor
- Date of birth: 20 May 1989 (age 37)
- Height: 1.79 m (5 ft 10 in)
- Position: Centre-back

Team information
- Current team: Grenoble
- Number: 14

Youth career
- 2004–2007: Le Havre

Senior career*
Years	Team	Apps	(Gls)
2007–2012	Le Havre	66	(5)
2010–2012	Le Havre B	4	(1)
2012–2015	Châteauroux	95	(2)
2013	Châteauroux B	1	(0)
2015–2019	Valenciennes	119	(3)
2019–2025	Grenoble	114	(9)
Total		399	(20)

International career^{‡}
2008	France U21	1	(0)
2014–2020	Guadeloupe	7	(1)
- * Club domestic league appearances and goals as of 11 May 2025 ‡ National team caps and goals as of 11:26, 8 September 2020 (UTC)

Loïc Duvart Nestor (born 20 May 1989) is a Guadeloupean former professional footballer who played as a centre-back.

== Club career ==
Nestor joined the youth team of Le Havre in 2004, and turned professional in 2007, making his Ligue 2 debut on 6 November 2007 against CS Sedan.

On 1st May 2025, Nestor announced his retirement from football, after suffering a torn cruciate ligament on the second day of the season. He made 423 appearances in the Ligue 2.

== International career ==
Nestor made one appearance for the France under-21 team in 2008.

== Career statistics ==
Scores and results list Guadeloupe's goal tally first.

No	Date	Venue	Opponent	Score	Result	Competition
1.	8 October 2014	Stade René Serge Nabajoth, Les Abymes, Guadeloupe	Saint Vincent and the Grenadines	2–1	3–1	2014 Caribbean Cup qualification

== Honours ==
Le Havre

- Ligue 2: 2008
