= Florian Michel =

French footballer (born 1992)

Personal information
- Date of birth: 25 March 1992 (age 34)
- Place of birth: Saint-Martin-d'Hères, France
- Height: 1.72 m (5 ft 8 in)
- Position: Midfielder

Team information
- Current team: Seyssinet

Youth career
- 2004–2013: Grenoble

Senior career*
| Years | Team | Apps | (Gls) |
| 2012–2014 | Grenoble | 50 | (5) |
| 2014–2019 | Bourgoin-Jallieu | 109 | (13) |
| 2019–2023 | Grenoble | 67 | (0) |
| 2023–2024 | Bourgoin-Jallieu | 13 | (1) |
| 2024– | Seyssinet | 4 | (0) |
- * Club domestic league appearances and goals as of 5 October 2024

Florian Michel (born 25 March 1992) is a French professional footballer who plays as a midfielder for Championnat National 3 club Seyssinet.

== Club career ==
A youth product of Grenoble Foot 38 since he was 12, Michel left Grenoble for Bourgoin-Jallieu in 2015. He returned to Grenoble on 6 June 2019. He made his professional debut with the club in a 1–0 Ligue 2 loss to Ajaccio on 2 August 2019.

On 26 January 2023, Michel returned to Bourgoin-Jallieu.
