= Jules Sylvestre-Brac =

French footballer (born 1998)

Personal information
- Date of birth: 18 August 1998 (age 28)
- Place of birth: Annecy, France
- Height: 1.85 m (6 ft 1 in)
- Position: Centre-back

Team information
- Current team: Stade Nyonnais
- Number: 28

Youth career
- Annecy

Senior career*
Years	Team	Apps	(Gls)
2018	Annecy-Le-Vieux		
2018–2019	Aix		
2019–2023	Grenoble	19	(1)
2020	→ Villefranche (loan)	0	(0)
2022	→ Moulins Yzeure (loan)	12	(1)
2022–2023	→ Stade Nyonnais (loan)	20	(0)
2023–	Stade Nyonnais	69	(4)
- * Club domestic league appearances and goals as of 15 June 2025

Jules Sylvestre-Brac (born 18 August 1998) is a French professional footballer who plays as a defender for Swiss club Stade Nyonnais.

== Club career ==
On 20 May 2019, Sylvestre-Brac signed with Grenoble Foot 38. He made his professional debut with Grenobole in a 0–0 Ligue 2 tie with FC Chambly on 9 August 2019.

On 31 January 2022, Sylvestre-Brac was loaned to Moulins Yzeure until the end of the season. On 1 September 2022, he moved on a new loan to Stade Nyonnais in Switzerland.
