= Manuel Perez (footballer, born 1991) =

French footballer

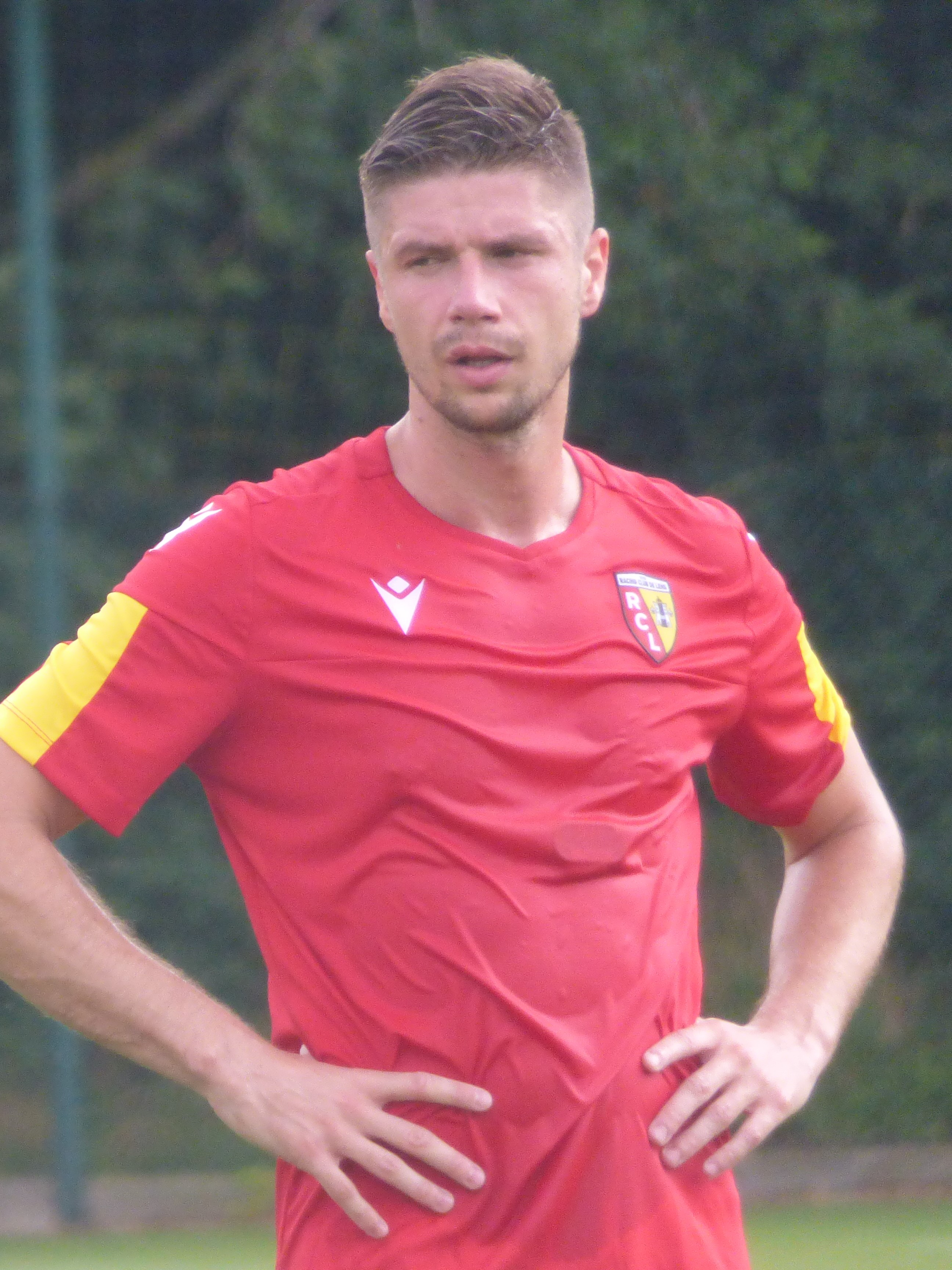
- Perez training with Lens in 2019

Personal information
- Date of birth: 11 May 1991 (age 35)
- Place of birth: Grenoble, France
- Height: 1.80 m (5 ft 11 in)
- Position: Midfielder

Youth career
- –2010: Grenoble

Senior career*
Years	Team	Apps	(Gls)
2010–2013	Grenoble	61	(6)
2013–2017	Brest	107	(0)
2017–2019	Clermont	50	(2)
2019–2020	Lens	20	(0)
2020–2024	Grenoble	50	(0)
Total		288	(8)
- * Club domestic league appearances and goals

Manuel Perez (born 11 May 1991) is a French former professional footballer who played as a midfielder.

== Career ==
=== Grenoble ===
Perez made his professional debut with his hometown club of Grenoble in a Ligue 2 4–1 defeat against Reims in October 2010, coming in the pitch for the last ten minutes of the game. He stayed in Grenoble two more years, before joining Brest in 2013.

=== Lens ===
On 11 June 2019, Perez signed a two-year contract with Ligue 2 club Lens.

=== Return to Grenoble ===
On 5 October 2020, Perez returned to his former club Grenoble, signing a three-year contract.

== Personal life ==
Perez is of Spanish descent through his grandparents, who are from Almería, Spain. According to the UNFP website, he holds both French and Brazilian citizenship.
