= Adrien Monfray =

French footballer (born 1990)

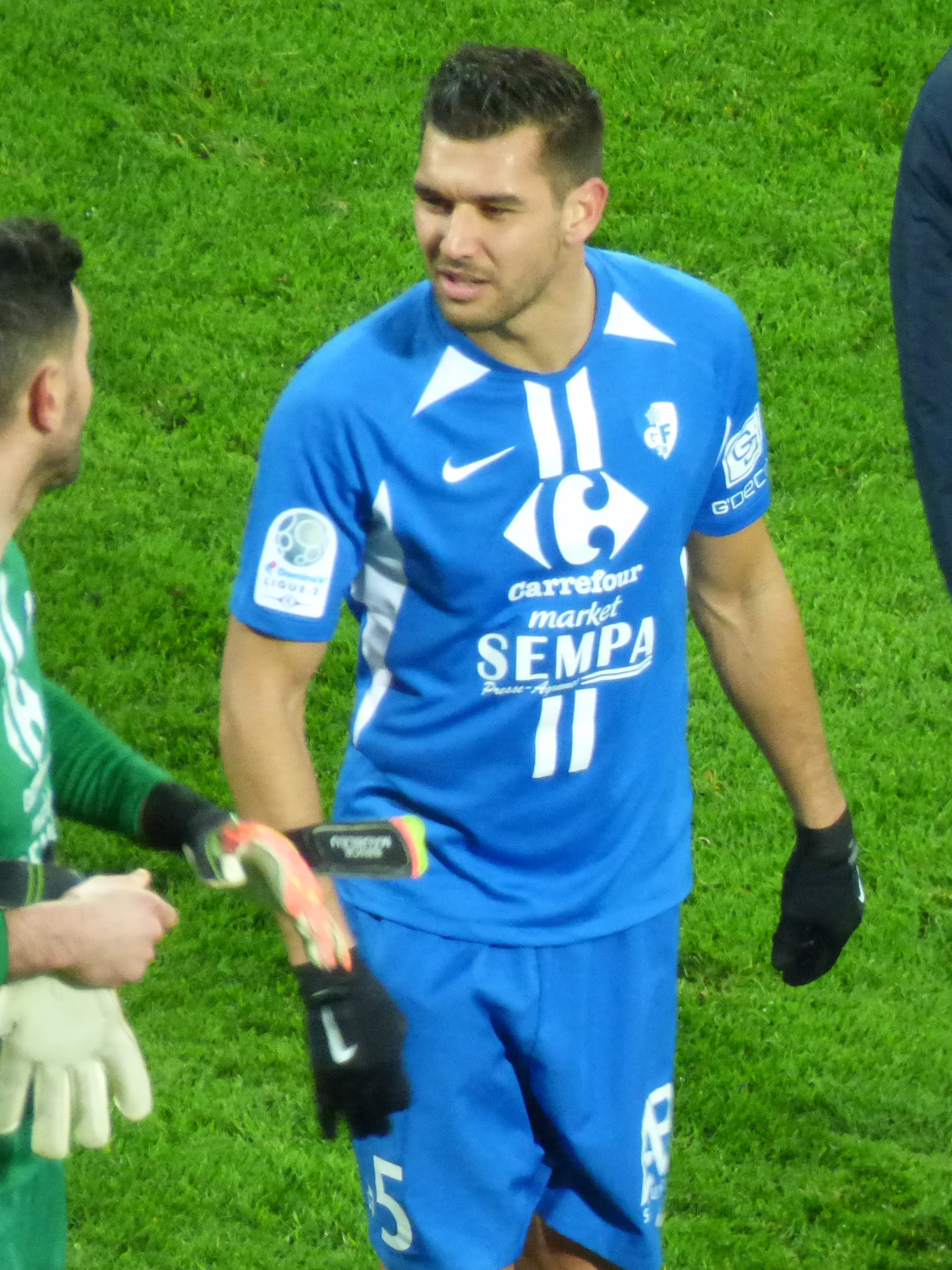
- Monfray in 2020

Personal information
- Full name: Adrien Mehdi Pierre Monfray
- Date of birth: 20 December 1990 (age 35)
- Place of birth: Nice, France
- Height: 1.85 m (6 ft 1 in)
- Position: Centre-back

Team information
- Current team: Troyes
- Number: 6

Youth career
- Monaco

Senior career*
Years	Team	Apps	(Gls)
2010–2012	Corte	56	(5)
2012–2014	CA Bastia	63	(1)
2014–2017	Laval	78	(2)
2014–2017	Laval B	3	(0)
2017–2019	Orléans	58	(1)
2019–2024	Grenoble	145	(1)
2024–	Troyes	58	(0)
- * Club domestic league appearances and goals as of 11 May 2026

Adrien-Mehdi Monfray (born 20 December 1990) is a French professional footballer who plays as a centre-back for Ligue 1 club Troyes.

== Club career ==
On 1 July 2024, Ligue 2 club Troyes signed Monfray on a two-year deal.

== Personal life ==
Born in France, Monfray is of Algerian descent.

== Career statistics ==
As of match played on 10 May 2025

Appearances and goals by club, season and competition
Club	Season	League			National cup		League cup		Other		Total	
Club	Season	Division	Apps	Goals	Apps	Goals	Apps	Goals	Apps	Goals	Apps	Goals
CA Bastia	2012–13	Championnat National	37	1	3	1	—		—		40	2
CA Bastia	2013–14	Ligue 2	26	0	1	0	0	0	—		27	0
CA Bastia	Total		63	1	4	1	0	0	—		67	2
Laval	2014–15	Ligue 2	25	0	1	0	3	0	—		29	0
Laval	2015–16	Ligue 2	34	1	2	0	3	1	—		39	2
Laval	2016–17	Ligue 2	19	1	1	0	2	0	—		22	1
Laval	Total		78	2	4	0	8	1	—		90	3
Orléans	2017–18	Ligue 2	35	1	0	0	1	0	—		36	1
Orléans	2018–19	Ligue 2	23	0	2	0	2	0	—		27	0
Orléans	Total		58	1	2	0	3	0	—		63	1
Grenoble	2019–20	Ligue 2	27	0	0	0	2	0	—		29	0
Grenoble	2020–21	Ligue 2	33	1	0	0	—		2	0	35	1
Grenoble	2021–22	Ligue 2	24	1	1	0	—		—		25	1
Grenoble	2022–23	Ligue 2	34	0	4	0	—		—		38	0
Grenoble	2023–24	Ligue 2	27	0	1	0	—		—		28	0
Grenoble	Total		145	2	6	0	2	0	2	0	155	2
Troyes	2024–25	Ligue 2	26	0	3	0	—		—		29	0
Career total			370	6	19	1	13	1	2	0	404	8
