= Esteban Salles =

French footballer (born 1994)

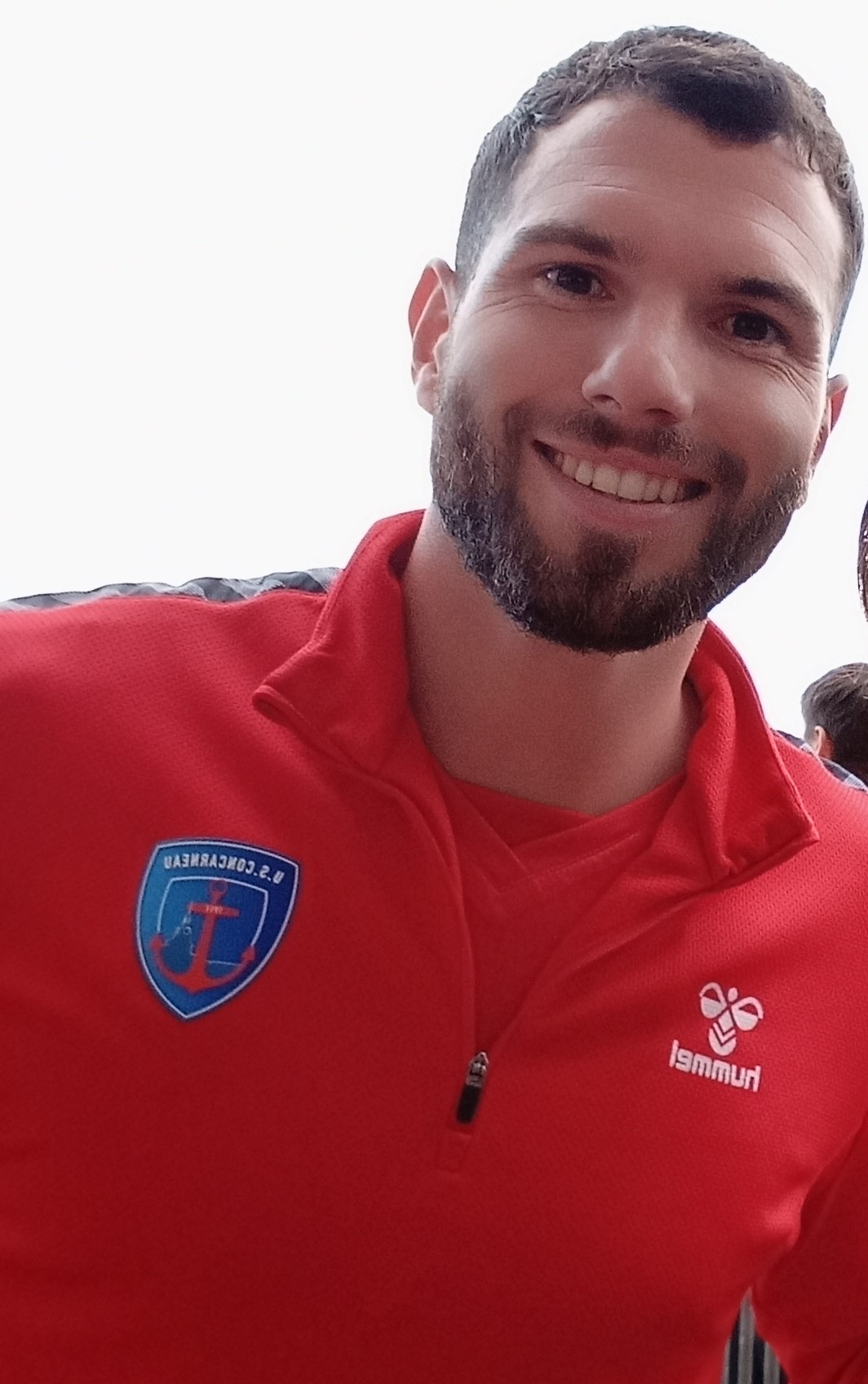
- Salles in 2024

Personal information
- Date of birth: 2 March 1994 (age 32)
- Place of birth: Oloron-Sainte-Marie, France
- Height: 1.87 m (6 ft 2 in)
- Position: Goalkeeper

Team information
- Current team: Pau FC
- Number: 30

Youth career
- 1999–2006: FC Oloron
- 2006–2012: Pau FC
- 2012–2014: Tours

Senior career*
Years	Team	Apps	(Gls)
2014–2016	Tours	4	(0)
2015–2016	→ Trélissac (loan)	21	(0)
2016–2018	Les Herbiers	13	(0)
2018–2023	Grenoble	29	(0)
2023–2025	US Concarneau	69	(0)
2025–	Pau FC	11	(0)
- * Club domestic league appearances and goals as of 11 May 2026

Esteban Salles (born 2 March 1994) is a French professional footballer who plays as a goalkeeper for Pau FC in Ligue 2.

== Early life and youth career ==
Salles was born in Oloron-Sainte-Marie, Pyrénées-Atlantiques. He began his football journey at local club FC Oloron before joining Pau FC’s youth academy in 2006. In 2012, he moved to Tours FC, where he completed his youth development and made the step up to professional football.

== Club career ==
=== Trélissac (loan) ===
In 2015, he was loaned to Trélissac FC in the CFA, where he played 21 matches during the 2015–16 season.

=== Grenoble Foot 38 ===
Salles signed for Grenoble Foot 38 in 2018. Over five seasons in Ligue 2, he made 29 appearances, primarily serving as a backup.

=== US Concarneau ===
Ahead of the 2023–24 season, Salles joined newly promoted US Concarneau. He quickly became the starting goalkeeper, making 69 appearances across two campaigns.

=== Pau FC ===
In June 2025, Salles returned to Pau FC, the club where he had spent part of his youth career.
