= 2022–23 AC Ajaccio season =

AC Ajaccio
2022–23 season
- President: Christian Leca
- Head coach: Olivier Pantaloni
- Stadium: Stade François Coty
- Ligue 1: 18th (relegated)
- Coupe de France: Round of 32
- Top goalscorer: League: Youcef Belaïli; Mounaïm El Idrissy (6 each); All: Youcef Belaïli; Mounaïm El Idrissy (6 each)
- Biggest win: Ajaccio 4–2 Strasbourg
- Biggest defeat: Monaco 7–1 Ajaccio
Home colours	Away colours	Third colours

The 2022–23 season was the 113th season in the existence of AC Ajaccio and the club's first season back in the top flight of French football since 2014. In addition to the domestic league, Ajaccio participated in this season's edition of the Coupe de France. The season covers the period from 1 July 2022 to 30 June 2023.

== Players ==
=== First-team squad ===
As of 1 February 2023

Note: Flags indicate national team as defined under FIFA eligibility rules; some limited exceptions apply. Players may hold more than one non-FIFA nationality.

No.	Pos.	Nation	Player
1	GK	FRA	Benjamin Leroy
2	DF	GLP	Mickaël Alphonse
3	DF	CIV	Ismaël Diallo
4	MF	FRA	Mickaël Barreto
5	MF	FRA	Riad Nouri
6	MF	FRA	Mathieu Coutadeur (captain)
7	FW	FRA	Mounaïm El Idrissy
8	MF	FRA	Vincent Marchetti (vice-captain)
9	FW	TUN	Yoann Touzghar
10	FW	ALG	Youcef Belaïli
14	FW	BFA	Cyrille Bayala
15	DF	FRA	Clément Vidal
16	GK	FRA	François-Joseph Sollacaro
17	FW	FRA	Romain Hamouma
18	FW	BFA	Kouamé Botué

No.	Pos.	Nation	Player
19	MF	FRA	Alassane N'Diaye
20	MF	COM	Mohamed Youssouf
21	DF	GLP	Cédric Avinel
22	MF	FRA	Yanis Cimignani
23	MF	FRA	Thomas Mangani
24	FW	BRA	Ruan Levine (on loan from SSA FC)
25	DF	CMR	Oumar Gonzalez
27	MF	SUI	Kevin Spadanuda
28	FW	SEN	Moussa Djitté (on loan from Austin FC)
29	FW	FRA	Florian Chabrolle
30	GK	FRA	Ghjuvanni Quilichini
34	FW	FRA	Moussa Soumano
44	DF	COM	Chaker Alhadhur
77	DF	CGO	Fernand Mayembo
99	DF	MLI	Youssouf Koné (on loan from Lyon)

=== Out on loan ===
Note: Flags indicate national team as defined under FIFA eligibility rules; some limited exceptions apply. Players may hold more than one non-FIFA nationality.

No.	Pos.	Nation	Player
—	DF	GAB	Sidney Obissa (at Villefranche until 30 June 2023)

== Transfers ==
=== In ===
Pos.	Player	Transferred from	Fee	Date	Source
MF	(France) Thomas Mangani	(France) Angers	Free	13 June 2022	
MF	(Switzerland) Kevin Spadanuda	(Switzerland) Aarau	Undisclosed	26 June 2022	
MF	(France) Romain Hamouma	(France) Saint-Étienne	Free	1 July 2022	
DF	(France) Clément Vidal	(France) Montpellier	Free	1 July 2022	
DF	(Guadeloupe) Mickaël Alphonse	(Israel) Maccabi Haifa	Free	1 July 2022	
DF	(Republic of the Congo) Fernand Mayembo	(France) Le Havre	€300,000	27 July 2022	
FW	(Tunisia) Yoann Touzghar	(France) Troyes	Free	24 August 2022	
DF	(Mali) Youssouf Koné	(France) Lyon	Loan	30 August 2022	

=== Out ===
Pos.	Player	Transferred to	Fee	Date	Source
DF	(Democratic Republic of the Congo) Gédéon Kalulu	(France) Lorient	Free	3 June 2022	
MF	(France) Tony Njiké	(Romania) Argeș Pitești	Free	21 June 2022	
FW	(Comoros) Faiz Mattoir	(Netherlands) Almere City	Free	27 June 2022	
FW	(France) Simon Elisor	(Belgium) Seraing	Undisclosed	11 July 2022	
FW	(France) Gaëtan Courtet	(France) Guingamp	€600,000	11 August 2022	
DF	(Gabon) Sidney Obissa	(France) Villefranche	Loan	11 August 2022	
FW	(France) Taïryk Arconte	(France) Brest	Undisclosed	1 September 2022	

== Pre-season and friendlies ==
Win Draw Loss Fixtures

9 July 2022 Friendly	Caen (France)	1–0	(France) Ajaccio	Deauville
18:00 CEST (UTC+2)	Mendy 15' (pen.); Court (yellow card) 33'; Mandréa (yellow card) 68'		Mangani (yellow card) 38'	Stadium: Stade du Commandant Hébert

13 July 2022 Friendly	Ajaccio (France)	2–0	(France) Niort	Fougères
18:00 CEST (UTC+2)	Courtet 18'; Cimignani 67'	Report		Stadium: Château du Bois-Guy

16 July 2022 Friendly	Cholet (France)	1–3	(France) Ajaccio	Mulsanne
16:30 CEST (UTC+2)	(pen.)	Report	El Idrissy 21'; Bayala 44'; Vidal 86'	Stadium: Stade de la Houssière

23 July 2022 Friendly	Paris FC (France)	1–0	(France) Ajaccio	Paris
18:00 CEST (UTC+2)	López 47'

30 July 2022 Friendly	Lorient (France)	1–1	(France) Ajaccio	Lorient
17:00 CEST (UTC+2)	Laporte 24'		Alphonse 36'	Stadium: Stade du Moustoir

14 December 2022 Friendly	Ajaccio (France)	1–0	(France) Saint-Étienne	Ajaccio
14:30 CET (UTC+1)	Belaïli 62' (pen.)			Stadium: Stade François Coty

21 December 2022 Friendly	Ajaccio (France)	2–0	Niger B
15:00 CET (UTC+1)	Laçi 85'; Nouri 90+1' (pen.)

== Competitions ==
=== Overall record ===
Competition	First match	Last match	Starting round	Final position	Record							
Competition	First match	Last match	Starting round	Final position	Pld	W	D	L	GF	GA	GD	Win %
Ligue 1	5 August 2022	3 June 2023	Matchday 1	18th	38	7	5	26	23	74	−51	18.42
Coupe de France	8 January 2023	21 January 2023	Round of 64	Round of 32	2	1	0	1	2	3	−1	50.00
Total					40	8	5	27	25	77	−52	20.00

Source: Soccerway

=== Ligue 1 ===
==== League table ====
Pos	Team	Pld	W	D	L	GF	GA	GD	Pts	Qualification or relegation
16	Nantes	38	7	15	16	37	55	−18	36	
17	Auxerre (R)	38	8	11	19	35	63	−28	35	Relegation to Ligue 2
18	Ajaccio (R)	38	7	5	26	23	74	−51	26	Relegation to Ligue 2
19	Troyes (R)	38	4	12	22	45	81	−36	24	Relegation to Ligue 2
20	Angers (R)	38	4	6	28	33	81	−48	18	Relegation to Ligue 2

Source: Ligue 1
Rules for classification: 1) Points; 2) Goal difference; 3) Head-to-head points; 4) Head-to-head goal difference; 5) Head-to-head goals scored; 6) Head-to-head away goals scored; 7) Goals scored; 8) Away goals scored; 9) Fair-play points (Note: Head-to-head record is used only after all the matches between the teams in question have been played).
(R) Relegated

==== Results summary ====
Overall								Home						Away					
Pld	W	D	L	GF	GA	GD	Pts	W	D	L	GF	GA	GD	W	D	L	GF	GA	GD
38	7	5	26	23	74	−51	26	4	3	12	10	30	−20	3	2	14	13	44	−31

Source: Ligue 1

==== Results by round ====
Round	1	2	3	4	5	6	7	8	9	10	11	12	13	14	15	16	17	18	19	20	21	22	23	24	25	26	27	28	29	30	31	32	33	34	35	36	37	38
Ground	A	H	A	H	A	H	H	A	H	A	A	H	A	H	A	H	A	H	A	H	A	H	A	A	H	A	H	H	A	H	A	H	A	H	A	H	A	H
Result	L	D	L	L	L	L	L	W	L	W	D	L	L	W	D	W	L	L	L	L	W	L	L	L	W	L	L	L	L	L	L	D	L	D	L	L	L	W
Position	15	17	18	20	20	20	20	20	20	18	18	19	19	17	18	15	16	16	18	18	17	18	18	19	17	18	18	19	19	19	19	19	19	18	18	19	19	18

Source: Ligue 1
A = Away; H = Home; W = Win; D = Draw; L = Loss

==== Matches ====
The league fixtures were announced on 17 June 2022.

5 August 2022 1	Lyon	2–1	Ajaccio	Décines-Charpieu
21:00 CEST (UTC+2)	Tetê 12'; Lacazette 22' (pen.), (yellow card) 33'; Lopes (red card) 27'	Report	Avinel (yellow card) 20'; Mangani 31' (pen.); Hamouma (yellow card) 33' (yellow-red card) 45+4'; El Idrissy (yellow card) 34'; Diallo (yellow card) 41'; Spadanuda (yellow card) 90+3'	Stadium: Parc Olympique Lyonnais; Attendance: 48,516; Referee: Benoît Bastien

14 August 2022 2	Ajaccio	0–0	Lens	Ajaccio
15:00 CEST (UTC+2)	Gonzalez (yellow card) 35'; Mangani (yellow card) 37'; Bayala (yellow card) 42'; Marchetti (yellow card) 59'; El Idrissy (yellow card) 79'	Report	Sotoca (yellow card) 75'; Danso (yellow card) 90+2'	Stadium: Stade François Coty; Attendance: 9,070; Referee: Stéphanie Frappart

21 August 2022 3	Rennes	2–1	Ajaccio	Rennes
17:05 CEST (UTC+2)	Terrier 18'; Badé (yellow card) 45+1'; Theate 62'; Santamaria (yellow card) 82'; D. Doué (yellow card) 86'; Ugochukwu (red card) 90+1'	Report	El Idrissy (yellow card) 45+4', (goal) 57'; Mayembo (yellow card) 79'	Stadium: Roazhon Park; Attendance: 27,592; Referee: Hakim Ben El Hadj

26 August 2022 4	Ajaccio	1–3	Lille	Ajaccio
21:00 CEST (UTC+2)	Magani (yellow card) 71'; Gonzalez (yellow card) 73'; Bayala 84', (yellow card) 86'	Report	Yazıcı 17'; Bamba 43'; Diakité (yellow card) 51'; Zhegrova (yellow card) 57'; Djaló 67'; David (penalty missed) 90'	Stadium: Stade François Coty; Attendance: 9,070; Referee: Thomas Léonard

31 August 2022 5	Montpellier	2–0	Ajaccio	Montpellier
19:00 CEST (UTC+2)	Nordin 28'; Ferri (yellow card) 41'; Omlin (red card) 45'; Sacko (yellow card) 52'; Wahi 77'	Report	Hamouma (yellow card) 20' (yellow-red card) 37'; Gonzalez (yellow card) 72'; Spadanuda (yellow card) 75'	Stadium: Stade de la Mosson; Attendance: 10,051; Referee: Bastien Dechepy

4 September 2022 6	Ajaccio	0–1	Lorient	Ajaccio
15:00 CEST (UTC+2)	Nouri (yellow card) 38'; Gonzalez (yellow card) 47'; El Idrissy (yellow card) 68'; Youssouf (yellow card) 90+4'	Report	Koné (yellow card) 35'; Ouattara 51'	Stadium: Stade François Coty; Attendance: 7,000; Referee: Jérémy Stinat

11 September 2022 7	Ajaccio	0–1	Nice	Ajaccio
15:00 CEST (UTC+2)	Marchetti (yellow card) 40'	Report	Todibo (yellow card) 53'; Dante (yellow card) 58'; Lotomba (yellow card) 61'; Delort 65'; Bard (yellow card) 80'; Barkley (yellow card) 89'	Stadium: Stade François Coty; Attendance: 7,068; Referee: Eric Wattellier

18 September 2022 8	Brest	0–1	Ajaccio	Brest
15:00 CEST (UTC+2)	Duverne (yellow card) 42'; Dari (yellow card) 64'	Report	Diallo (yellow card) 30'; Hamouma (yellow card) 45+1', (goal) 65'	Stadium: Stade Francis-Le Blé; Attendance: 11,153; Referee: Stéphanie Frappart

2 October 2022 9	Ajaccio	1–3	Clermont	Ajaccio
15:00 CEST (UTC+2)	Alphonse (yellow card) 64'; Avinel 70'; Bayala (yellow card) 76'; Diallo (yellow card) 88'	Report	Kyei 11'; Gastien (yellow card) 45'; Zeffane (yellow card) 73'; Caufriez (yellow card) 76'; Rashani 89'; Dossou 90+1'	Stadium: Stade François Coty; Attendance: 6,610; Referee: Clément Turpin

8 October 2022 10	Marseille	1–2	Ajaccio	Marseille
17:00 CEST (UTC+2)	Payet 15' (pen.)	Report	Koné (yellow card) 11'; Moussiti-Oko 25'; Balerdi 47' (o.g.); Gonzalez (yellow card) 86'	Stadium: Stade Vélodrome; Attendance: 63,312; Referee: Willy Delajod

16 October 2022 11	Troyes	1–1	Ajaccio	Troyes
15:00 CEST (UTC+2)	M. Baldé (yellow card) 18'; Ripart (yellow card) 53'; Porozo 76'	Report	Koné (yellow card) 16'; Nouri (penalty missed) 37'; El Idrissy 88'	Stadium: Stade de l'Aube; Attendance: 7,731; Referee: Jérôme Brisard

21 October 2022 12	Ajaccio	0–3	Paris Saint-Germain	Ajaccio
21:00 CEST (UTC+2)		Report	Verratti (yellow card) 23'; Mbappé 24', 82'; Messi 78'	Stadium: Stade François Coty; Attendance: 10,000; Referee: Johan Hamel

30 October 2022 13	Auxerre	1–0	Ajaccio	Auxerre
13:00 CEST (UTC+2)	Sakhi 4'; Jubal (yellow card) 23'; Niang (red card) 56'	Report	Vidal (yellow card) 39'; Avinel (red card) 62'	Stadium: Stade de l'Abbé-Deschamps; Attendance: 15,092; Referee: Benoît Millot

5 November 2022 14	Ajaccio	4–2	Strasbourg	Ajaccio
17:00 CET (UTC+1)	Belaïli 33' (pen.), 40' (pen.), (penalty missed) 63'; El Idrissy 34'; Nouri 45+3'; Vidal (red card) 79'	Report	Bellegarde 6'; Gameiro 17'; Pierre-Gabriel (yellow card) 22'; Delaine (yellow card) 32'; Le Marchand (yellow card) 62'; Dagba (yellow card) 90+2'	Stadium: Stade François Coty; Attendance: 7,203; Referee: Mathieu Vernice

13 November 2022 15	Nantes	2–2	Ajaccio	Nantes
15:00 CET (UTC+1)	Blas (yellow card) 37', (goal) 70'; Castelletto (yellow card) 45+1'; Girotto (yellow card) 62'; Simon 89'	Report	Koné (yellow card) 35'; Nouri (yellow card) 45+1'; Gonzalez (yellow card) 51'; Belaïli 57' (pen.); Hamouma 66'; Marchetti (yellow card) 90'	Stadium: Stade de la Beaujoire; Attendance: 29,407; Referee: Jérémie Pignard

28 December 2022 16	Ajaccio	1–0	Angers	Ajaccio
15:00 CET (UTC+1)	Belaïli 40' (pen.); Youssouf (yellow card) 55'	Report		Stadium: Stade François Coty; Attendance: 7,088; Referee: Jérémy Stinat

1 January 2023 17	Toulouse	2–0	Ajaccio	Toulouse
15:00 CET (UTC+1)	Van den Boomen (yellow card) 37'; Ratão 46'; Dejaegere (yellow card) 56', (goal) 62'; Dallinga (yellow card) 90+3'	Report	Moussiti-Oko (yellow card) 78'	Stadium: Stadium de Toulouse; Attendance: 25,957; Referee: Pierre Gaillouste

11 January 2023 18	Ajaccio	0–1	Reims	Ajaccio
19:00 CET (UTC+1)	Youssouf (yellow card) 16'; Nouri (yellow card) 19'; El Idrissy (yellow card) 70'	Report	Munetsi 3'; De Smet (yellow card) 50'; Balogun (yellow card) 70'; Adeline (yellow card) 81'	Stadium: Stade François Coty; Attendance: 6,648; Referee: Willy Delajod

15 January 2023 19	Monaco	7–1	Ajaccio	Monaco
17:05 CET (UTC+1)	Disasi 2'; Diatta 6'; Camara (yellow card) 20'; Ben Yedder 21', 28', 35' (pen.); Embolo 63', 89'	Report	Belaïli 11'; Diallo (yellow card) 33'; Mangani (yellow card) 46'	Stadium: Stade Louis II; Attendance: 8,000; Referee: Ruddy Buquet

29 January 2023 20	Ajaccio	0–2	Lyon	Ajaccio
17:05 CET (UTC+1)	Gonzalez (yellow card) 28'; El Idrissy (yellow card) 53'	Report	Lepenant 20'; Lopes (yellow card) 53'; Kumbedi (yellow card) 57'; Tagliafico (yellow card) 70'; Lacazette 71'	Stadium: Stade François Coty; Attendance: 9,788; Referee: Thomas Léonard

1 February 2023 21	Angers	1–2	Ajaccio	Angers
15:00 CET (UTC+1)	Sima 13'; Salama (yellow card) 57'; Doumbia (red card) 78'	Report	Marchetti (yellow card) 21'; Diallo (yellow card) 45+1'; Soumano 65'; El Idrissy 90+4'	Stadium: Stade Raymond Kopa; Attendance: 7,255; Referee: Bastien Dechepy

5 February 2023 22	Ajaccio	0–2	Nantes	Ajaccio
15:00 CET (UTC+1)	Chabrolle (yellow card) 19'; El Idrissy (yellow card) 56'; Diallo (red card) 88'	Report	João Victor (yellow card) 56'; Guessand 63'; Blas 89' (pen.)	Stadium: Stade François Coty; Attendance: 11,598; Referee: Ruddy Buquet

10 February 2023 23	Nice	3–0	Ajaccio	Nice
21:00 CET (UTC+1)	Dante 2'; Boudaoui (yellow card) 56'; Brahimi 68', 89'	Report		Stadium: Allianz Riviera; Attendance: 20,163; Referee: Stéphanie Frappart

19 February 2023 24	Lorient	3–0	Ajaccio	Lorient
15:00 CET (UTC+1)	Dieng 6' (pen.); Faivre 43'; Ponceau 58'	Report	Youssouf (yellow card) 28'; Vidal (yellow card) 49'	Stadium: Stade du Moustoir; Attendance: 12,918; Referee: Eric Wattelier

26 February 2023 25	Ajaccio	2–1	Troyes	Ajaccio
15:00 CET (UTC+1)	Vidal (yellow card) 51'; Belaïli 62' (pen.); El Idrissy 68'; Marchetti (yellow card) 76'	Report	M. Baldé 23', (yellow card) 71' (yellow-red card) 76'	Stadium: Stade François Coty; Attendance: 5,983; Referee: Marc Bollengier

5 March 2023 26	Reims	1–0	Ajaccio	Reims
15:00 CET (UTC+1)	Matusiwa (yellow card) 67'; Abdelhamid (yellow card) 90+1'; Cajuste (yellow card) 84', (goal) 90+5'	Report	Belaïli (yellow card) 58'; Barreto (yellow card) 83'; El Idrissy (yellow card) 89'; Sollacaro (yellow card) 90+6'	Stadium: Stade Auguste Delaune; Attendance: 12,855; Referee: Pierre Gaillouste

12 March 2023 27	Ajaccio	0–1	Montpellier	Ajaccio
15:00 CET (UTC+1)	Youssouf (yellow card) 5'; Gonzalez (yellow card) 90+3'	Report	Nordin (yellow card) 32'; Savanier (yellow card) 59'; Wahi 68'	Stadium: Stade François Coty; Attendance: 13,889; Referee: Hakim Ben El Hadj

19 March 2023 28	Ajaccio	0–2	Monaco	Ajaccio
13:00 CET (UTC+1)	Belaïli (yellow card) 2'; Diallo (yellow card) 14'; Bayala (red card) 53'	Report	Ben Yedder 27'; Maripán (yellow card) 49'; Diatta 84'	Stadium: Stade François Coty; Attendance: 7,198; Referee: Jérémy Stinat

2 April 2023 29	Clermont	2–1	Ajaccio	Clermont-Ferrand
15:00 CEST (UTC+2)	Konaté (yellow card) 54'; Kyei 60' (pen.), 90+3' (pen.); Seidu (yellow card) 71'	Report	El Idrissy 25'; Soumano (yellow card) 58'; Vidal (yellow card) 60'; Youssouf (red card) 77'; Leroy (yellow card) 83'; Alphonse (yellow card) 90+1'; Coutadeur (yellow card) 90+1'	Stadium: Stade Gabriel Montpied; Attendance: 9,436; Referee: Mathieu Vernice

9 April 2023 30	Ajaccio	0–3	Auxerre	Ajaccio
15:00 CEST (UTC+2)	Diallo (yellow card) 49'	Report	B. Touré 2'; Jeanvier (yellow card) 4'; Da Costa 5'; Alphonse 45+1' (o.g.); M'Changama (yellow card) 65'; Zedadka (yellow card) 86'	Stadium: Stade François Coty; Attendance: 6,742; Referee: Bastien Dechepy

16 April 2023 31	Strasbourg	3–1	Ajaccio	Strasbourg
15:00 CEST (UTC+2)	Gameiro 26' (pen.); Diarra 71', (yellow card) 90+3'; Prcić (yellow card) 78'; Suzuki 89'	Report	El Idrissy (yellow card) 34'; Coutadeur (yellow card) 63'; Avinel (yellow card) 70'; Barreto 76'; Diallo (yellow card) 83'; Koné (yellow card) 90+3'	Stadium: Stade de la Meinau; Attendance: 25,130; Referee: Stéphanie Frappart

23 April 2023 32	Ajaccio	0–0	Brest	Ajaccio
15:00 CEST (UTC+2)	Diallo (yellow card) 27'; Touzghar (red card) 66'; El Idrissy (yellow card) 68'	Report	Mounié (yellow card) 29'; Camara (yellow card) 34'	Stadium: Stade François Coty; Attendance: 6,879; Referee: Jérémy Stinat

29 April 2023 33	Lille	3–0	Ajaccio	Villeneuve-d'Ascq
17:00 CEST (UTC+2)	Munetsi 21'; Abdelhamid (yellow card) 71'; Alexsandro (yellow card) 83'; Busi (yellow card) 90+4'	Report	Fonte (yellow card) 37'; Ang. Gomes (yellow card) 60'	Stadium: Stade Pierre-Mauroy; Attendance: 17,911; Referee: Thomas Léonard

7 May 2023 34	Ajaccio	0–0	Toulouse	Ajaccio
15:00 CEST (UTC+2)	Gonzalez (yellow card) 49'; Mangani (yellow card) 64'; Marchetti (yellow card) 69'	Report		Stadium: Stade François Coty; Attendance: 6,735; Referee: Florent Batta

13 May 2023 35	Paris Saint-Germain	5–0	Ajaccio	Paris
21:00 CEST (UTC+2)	Fabián 22'; Hakimi 33', (red card) 77'; Mbappé 47', 54'; Youssouf 73' (o.g.); Marquinhos (yellow card) 77'	Report	Marchetti (yellow card) 77'; Mangani (red card) 77'	Stadium: Parc des Princes; Attendance: 47,926; Referee: Pierre Gaillouste

21 May 2023 36	Ajaccio	0–5	Rennes	Ajaccio
13:00 CEST (UTC+2)	Vidal (yellow card) 56'; Alphonse (red card) 62'	Report	Santamaria 13'; Gouiri 30', 39', 70'; Doku 36'; Belocian (yellow card) 45'; Assignon (yellow card) 84'	Stadium: Stade François Coty; Attendance: 6,637; Referee: Eric Wattelier

27 May 2023 37	Lens	3–0	Ajaccio	Lens
21:00 CEST (UTC+2)	Machado 15'; Thomasson 21'; Openda 34' (pen.), (yellow card) 56'	Report	Strata (yellow card) 12'; Gonzalez (yellow card) 33'	Stadium: Stade Bollaert-Delelis; Attendance: 37,601; Referee: Thomas Léonard

3 June 2023 38	Ajaccio	1–0	Marseille	Ajaccio
21:00 CEST (UTC+2)	Vidal 88'; Soumano (yellow card) 90+4'	Report	Balerdi (yellow card) 21'	Stadium: Stade François Coty; Attendance: 9,500; Referee: Benoît Bastien

=== Coupe de France ===
8 January 2023 Round of 64	Jura Sud Foot	1–2	Ajaccio	Moirans-en-Montagne
15:30 CET (UTC+1)	Gaubey (yellow card) 44'; Delbos (yellow card) 70'; Wagué 90+1'	Report	Moussiti-Oko (yellow card) 19'; Levine 45+2' (pen.), 63'; Marchetti (yellow card) 51'	Stadium: Stade Municipal; Attendance: 2,080; Referee: Stéphanie Frappart

21 January 2023 Round of 32	Toulouse	2–0	Ajaccio	Toulouse
18:00 CET	Sylla (yellow card) 32'; Aboukhlal 66'; Ratão 69'	Report	Gonzalez (yellow card) 8'	Stadium: Stade Municipal; Attendance: 18,708; Referee: François Letexier

== Statistics ==
=== Goalscorers ===
Position	Players	Ligue 1	Coupe de France	Total
MF	(Algeria) Youcef Belaïli	6	0	6
FW	(France) Mounaïm El Idrissy	6	0	6
FW	(France) Romain Hamouma	2	0	2
MF	(Brazil) Ruan Levine	0	2	2
DF	(France) Cédric Avinel	1	0	1
MF	(France) Mickaël Barreto	1	0	1
FW	(Burkina Faso) Cyrille Bayala	1	0	1
MF	(France) Thomas Mangani	1	0	1
FW	(Republic of the Congo) Bevic Moussiti-Oko	1	0	1
MF	(France) Riad Nouri	1	0	1
FW	(France) Moussa Soumano	1	0	1
DF	(France) Clément Vidal	1	0	1
