= 2021–22 AC Ajaccio season =

AC Ajaccio
2021–22 season
- Chairman: Christian Leca
- Manager: Olivier Pantaloni
- Stadium: Stade François Coty
- Ligue 2: 2nd (promoted)
- Coupe de France: Seventh round
Home colours	Away colours

The 2021–22 season was the 112th season in the existence of AC Ajaccio and the club's ninth consecutive season in the second division of French football. In addition to the domestic league, Ajaccio participated in this season's edition of the Coupe de France.

== Players ==
=== First-team squad ===
As of 12 October 2021.

Note: Flags indicate national team as defined under FIFA eligibility rules; some limited exceptions apply. Players may hold more than one non-FIFA nationality.

No.	Pos.	Nation	Player
1	GK	FRA	Benjamin Leroy
2	DF	COD	Gédéon Kalulu
3	DF	CIV	Ismaël Diallo
4	MF	FRA	Mickaël Barreto
5	MF	FRA	Riad Nouri
6	MF	FRA	Mathieu Coutadeur (captain)
7	FW	FRA	Mounaïm El Idrissy
8	MF	FRA	Vincent Marchetti
9	FW	FRA	Gaëtan Courtet
10	MF	ALB	Qazim Laçi
11	FW	CGO	Bevic Moussiti-Oko
12	FW	FRA	Taïryk Arconte
14	FW	BFA	Cyrille Bayala
15	DF	FRA	Clément Vidal (on loan from Montpellier)

No.	Pos.	Nation	Player
16	GK	FRA	François-Joseph Sollacaro
17	FW	FRA	Jean-Philippe Krasso (on loan from Saint-Étienne)
18	FW	BFA	Kouamé Botué
19	MF	FRA	Alassane N'Diaye
20	MF	COM	Mohamed Youssouf
21	DF	GLP	Cédric Avinel
22	MF	FRA	Yanis Cimignani
24	DF	COM	Chaker Alhadhur
25	DF	CMR	Oumar Gonzalez
29	FW	FRA	Florian Chabrolle
33	MF	TUN	Anis Ajroud
34	MF	FRA	Paolo Lebas
40	GK	FRA	Ghjuvanni Quilichini

=== Out on loan ===
Note: Flags indicate national team as defined under FIFA eligibility rules; some limited exceptions apply. Players may hold more than one non-FIFA nationality.

No.	Pos.	Nation	Player
—	DF	GAB	Sidney Obissa (on loan at Olympic Charleroi)
—	MF	FRA	Tony Njiké (on loan at Cholet)

No.	Pos.	Nation	Player
—	FW	FRA	Simon Elisor (on loan at Villefranche)
—	FW	COM	Faiz Mattoir (on loan at Cholet)

== Pre-season and friendlies ==
Win Draw Loss Fixtures

30 June 2021 Friendly	Ajaccio (France)	2–1	(France) Bastia-Borgo	Ajaccio, France
18:00 CEST (UTC+2)				Stadium: Stade François Coty

3 July 2021 Friendly	Quevilly-Rouen (France)	0–3	(France) Ajaccio	Lisieux, France
18:00 CEST (UTC+2)				Stadium: Stade Lisieux

7 July 2021 Friendly	Laval (France)	1–2	(France) Ajaccio	Fougères, France
18:30 CEST (UTC+2)				Stadium: Stade Jean Manfredi

10 July 2021 Friendly	Caen (France)	0–0	(France) Ajaccio	Mondeville, France
16:00 CEST (UTC+2)				Stadium: Stade Michel Farré

17 July 2021 Friendly	Nîmes (France)	1–0	(France) Ajaccio	Mallemort, France
17:30 CEST (UTC+2)				Stadium: Stade D'Honneur Mallemort

== Competitions ==
=== Overall record ===
Competition	First match	Last match	Starting round	Final position	Record							
Competition	First match	Last match	Starting round	Final position	Pld	W	D	L	GF	GA	GD	Win %
Ligue 2	24 July 2021	14 May 2022	Matchday 1	2nd	38	22	9	7	39	19	+20	57.89
Coupe de France	12 November 2021		Seventh round	Seventh round	1	0	1	0	0	0	+0	0.00
Total					39	22	10	7	39	19	+20	56.41

Source: Soccerway

=== Ligue 2 ===
==== League table ====
Pos	Team	Pld	W	D	L	GF	GA	GD	Pts	Promotion or Relegation
1	Toulouse (C, P)	38	23	10	5	82	33	+49	79	Promotion to Ligue 1
2	Ajaccio (P)	38	22	9	7	39	19	+20	75	Promotion to Ligue 1
3	Auxerre (O, P)	38	21	11	6	61	39	+22	74	Qualification to promotion play-offs
4	Paris FC	38	20	10	8	54	35	+19	70	Qualification to promotion play-offs
5	Sochaux	38	19	11	8	47	34	+13	68	Qualification to promotion play-offs

Source: Ligue 2
Rules for classification: 1) Points; 2) Goal difference; 3) Number of goals scored; 4) Head-to-head goal difference; 5) Fair play points
(C) Champions; (O) Play-off winners; (P) Promoted

==== Results summary ====
Overall								Home						Away					
Pld	W	D	L	GF	GA	GD	Pts	W	D	L	GF	GA	GD	W	D	L	GF	GA	GD
38	22	9	7	39	19	+20	75	13	3	3	21	8	+13	9	6	4	18	11	+7

Source: Ligue 2

==== Results by round ====
Round	1	2	3	4	5	6	7	8	9	10	11	12	13	14	15	16	17	18	19	20	21	22	23	24	25	26	27	28	29	30	31	32	33	34	35	36	37	38
Ground	A	H	A	H	H	A	H	A	H	A	H	A	H	A	H	A	H	A	H	A	H	A	A	H	A	H	A	H	A	H	A	H	A	H	A	H	A	H
Result	D	W	D	W	W	D	W	W	D	L	L	W	W	L	W	W	D	W	W	W	D	L	L	L	W	W	W	L	D	W	W	W	W	W	D	W	D	W
Position	6	5	7	4	3	5	2	2	2	4	5	3	3	4	3	2	2	1	1	1	4	3	2	2	1	1	1	1	2	3	4	2	2	2	2	2	2	2

Source: Ligue 2
A = Away; H = Home; W = Win; D = Draw; L = Loss

==== Matches ====
The league fixtures were announced on 25 June 2021.

24 July 2021 1	Toulouse	2–2	Ajaccio	Toulouse
19:00 CEST (UTC+2)	Evitt-Healey 34', (yellow card) 50'; Kalulu 54' (o.g.); Adli (red card) 90+5'	Report	Vidal (yellow card) 10' (yellow-red card) 38'; Youssouf (yellow card) 14'; Laçi 35', 59'; Huard (yellow card) 40'; Leroy (yellow card) 77'; Avinel (yellow card) 90+4'	Stadium: Stadium de Toulouse; Referee: Frank Schneider

31 July 2021 2	Ajaccio	3–1	Amiens	Ajaccio
19:00 CEST (UTC+2)	Cimignani 10'; Courtet 45+1'; Avinel (yellow card) 46'; Gonzalez (yellow card) 65'; Moussiti-Oko 74'	Report	Arokodare 47' (pen.); Lachuer (yellow card) 62'; Diakhaby (yellow card) 65'; Gomis (yellow card) 69'; Papeau (yellow card) 88'	Stadium: Stade François Coty; Referee: Nicolas Rainville

7 August 2021 3	Auxerre	0–0	Ajaccio	Auxerre
19:00 CEST (UTC+2)	Touré (yellow card) 60'; Sinayoko (yellow card) 68'; Hein (yellow card) 90+7'	Report	Youssouf (yellow card) 40'; Botué (yellow card) 78'; Gonzalez (yellow card) 83'; Courtet (yellow card) 90'	Stadium: Stade de l'Abbé-Deschamps; Referee: Olivier Thual

25 August 2021 4	Ajaccio	2–0	Caen	Ajaccio
19:00 CEST (UTC+2)	Botué 1'; Courtet (yellow card) 53'; Gonzalez 75'; Kalulu (yellow card) 85'	Report	Deminguet (yellow card) 53'; Lepenant (yellow card) 70'; Mendy (red card) 80'	Stadium: Stade François Coty; Attendance: 2,830; Referee: Rémi Landry

28 August 2021 6	Guingamp	1–1	Ajaccio	Guingamp
19:00 CEST (UTC+2)	Ba 78'	Report	Gonzalez 38'	Stadium: Stade de Roudourou; Referee: Guillaume Paradis

11 September 2021 7	Ajaccio	1–0	Sochaux	Ajaccio
19:00 CEST (UTC+2)	Cimignani (yellow card) 24'; Gonzalez (yellow card) 26'; Courtet (yellow card) 70', (goal) 75'; Moussiti-Oko (yellow card) 80'; Diallo (yellow card) 82'	Report	Pogba (yellow card) 29'; Ambri (yellow card) 79'	Stadium: Stade François Coty; Referee: Frank Schneider

14 September 2021 5	Ajaccio	1–0	Paris FC	Ajaccio
19:00 CEST (UTC+2)	Gonzalez 89'	Report	Bernauer (yellow card) 48'; López (penalty missed) 64'; Laura (red card) 90+5'	Stadium: Stade François Coty; Referee: Eric Wattellier

18 September 2021 8	Rodez	0–2	Ajaccio	Rodez
19:00 CET (UTC+1)		Report	Moussiti-Oko 3'; Sollacaro (yellow card) 31'; Gonzalez (yellow card) 38'; Nouri 49'; Courtet (yellow card) 90+3'	Stadium: Stade Paul-Lignon; Referee: Gael Angoula

21 September 2021 9	Ajaccio	0–0	Niort	Ajaccio
19:00 CEST (UTC+2)	Diallo (yellow card) 24'; Vidal (yellow card) 45'; Laçi (yellow card) 68'	Report	Conté (yellow card) 19'; Sissoko (yellow card) 24'; Passi (yellow card) 86'	Stadium: Stade François Coty; Referee: Benjamin Lepaysant

25 September 2021 10	Bastia	2–0	Ajaccio	Furiani
15:00 CEST (UTC+2)	Santelli 49'; Schur (yellow card) 61', (goal) 63'	Report	Courtet (yellow card) 34'; Kalulu (yellow card) 42'; Diallo (yellow card) 51'	Stadium: Stade Armand Cesari; Referee: Florent Batta

2 October 2021 11	Ajaccio	0–1	Quevilly-Rouen	Ajaccio
19:00 CEST (UTC+2)	Cimignani (yellow card) 8'; Nouri (yellow card) 84'	Report	Zabou (yellow card) 25'; Sidibé (yellow card) 49'; Diaby 62'; Cissokho (yellow card) 68'; Sangaré (yellow card) 73' (yellow-red card) 83'; Bansais (yellow card) 75'	Stadium: Stade François Coty; Referee: Alexandre Perreau Niel

18 October 2021 12	Nîmes	0–2	Ajaccio	Nîmes
20:45 CEST (UTC+2)	Ferhat (yellow card) 66'; Guessoum (yellow card) 90'	Report	Courtet 12'; Cimignani (yellow card) 31'; Nouri 33'; El Idrissy (yellow card) 40'	Stadium: Stade des Costières; Referee: Guillaume Paradis

23 October 2021 13	Ajaccio	2–0	Nancy	Ajaccio
19:00 CEST (UTC+2)	Nouri 8', 58'; Gonzalez (yellow card) 16'	Report	Jung (yellow card) 42'	Stadium: Stade François Coty; Referee: Mathieu Vernice

30 October 2021 14	Pau	1–0	Ajaccio	Pau
19:00 CEST (UTC+2)	Sylvestre (yellow card) 44'; Kouassi (yellow card) 52'; Lobry 55'	Report	El Idrissy (yellow card) 39'; Coutadeur (yellow card) 74'; Courtet (yellow card) 75'; Gonzalez (yellow card) 81'	Stadium: Nouste Camp; Referee: Marc Bollengier

6 November 2021 15	Ajaccio	1–0	Dijon	Ajaccio
19:00 CEST (UTC+2)	Cimignani (yellow card) 8'; Bayala (yellow card) 40'; Avinel (yellow card) 74'; Marchetti (yellow card) 89'; Nouri (yellow card) 90+1'; El Idrissy 90+4'	Report	Le Bihan (yellow card) 17'; Scheidler (yellow card) 61'; Coulibaly (yellow card) 89'	Stadium: Stade François Coty; Referee: Bartolomeu Varela

20 November 2021 16	Dunkerque	0–1	Ajaccio	Dunkerque
19:00 CEST (UTC+2)	Kikonda (yellow card) 54'; Bruneel (yellow card) 90+2'	Report	Cimignani 68'; Avinel (yellow card) 70'; Courtet (yellow card) 73'	Stadium: Stade Marcel-Tribut; Referee: Arnaud Baert

3 December 2021 17	Ajaccio	0–0	Valenciennes	Ajaccio
19:00 CET (UTC+1)	Botué (yellow card) 80'	Report	Masson (yellow card) 61'; Doukouré (yellow card) 66'; Ntim (yellow card) 84'	Stadium: Stade François Coty; Referee: Pierre Legat

11 December 2021 18	Le Havre	0–1	Ajaccio	Le Havre
19:00 CEST (UTC+2)	Lekhal (yellow card) 31'	Report	Courtet 85'	Stadium: Stade Océane; Referee: Jérôme Brisard

21 December 2021 19	Ajaccio	1–0	Grenoble	Ajaccio
20:45 CET (UTC+1)	Courtet (yellow card) 45'; Nouri 49'	Report	Monfray (yellow card) 22'; Anani (yellow card) 45+1'; Henen (yellow card) 60'; Correa (yellow card) 90+1'; Perez (red card) 90+6'	Stadium: Stade François Coty; Referee: Arnaud Baert

19 January 2022 20	Amiens	0–1	Ajaccio	Amiens
19:00 CET (UTC+1)	Pavlović (yellow card) 54'; Mendy (yellow card) 66'; Zungu (yellow card) 66'	Report	Avinel (yellow card) 25'; Nouri 42'; Cimignani (yellow card) 87'	Stadium: Stade de la Licorne; Referee: Guillaume Paradis

24 January 2022 22	Caen	2–0	Ajaccio	Caen
20:45 CET (UTC+1)	Mendy 65' (pen.); Vandermersch (yellow card) 80'; Lepenant (yellow card) 86'; Deminguet 90'	Report		Stadium: Stade Michel d'Ornano; Referee: Jérémy Stinat

28 January 2022 21	Ajaccio	0–0	Auxerre	Ajaccio
19:00 CET (UTC+1)	Vidal (yellow card) 48'; Marchetti (yellow card) 60' (yellow-red card) 70'	Report	Joly (yellow card) 30'; Léon (yellow card) 35'; Jubal (yellow card) 72'	Stadium: Stade François Coty; Referee: Mathieu Vernice

7 February 2022 23	Paris FC	2–0	Ajaccio	Le Mans
20:45 CET (UTC+1)	Boutaïb (yellow card) 33'; Gory 53'; Guilavogui 62' (pen.)	Report	Gonzalez (yellow card) 43'; Diallo (yellow card) 59'	Stadium: MMArena; Referee: Hakim Ben El Hadj

12 February 2022 24	Ajaccio	0–1	Guingamp	Ajaccio
19:00 CET (UTC+1)	Courtet (red card) 10'; El Idrissy (yellow card) 90'	Report	Livolant (yellow card) 29' (goal) 66'; Ba (yellow card) 40'; Roux (yellow card) 57' (yellow-red card) 84'; Philipe Sampaio (yellow card) 87'	Stadium: Stade François Coty; Referee: Pierre Legat

19 February 2022 25	Sochaux	0–1	Ajaccio	Montbéliard
19:00 CET (UTC+1)	Virginius (yellow card) 24'; Kitala (yellow card) 75'; Mauricio (yellow card) 81'	Report	El Idrissy (yellow card) 14' (goal) 47'; Youssouf (yellow card) 18'; Cimignani (red card) 77'	Stadium: Stade Auguste Bonal; Referee: Thomas Léonard

26 February 2022 26	Ajaccio	2–1	Rodez	Ajaccio
19:00 CET (UTC+1)	Krasso 11' (yellow card) 75'; Marchetti (yellow card) 38'; Nouri 45+1'	Report	Vilhjálmsson 33'; Danger (yellow card) 40'; Célestine (yellow card) 61'; Bardy (yellow card) 67'	Stadium: Stade François Coty; Referee: Mathieu Vernice

5 March 2022 27	Niort	0–1	Ajaccio	Niort
19:00 CET (UTC+1)		Report	Cimignani (yellow card) 19'; Krasso 86'	Stadium: Stade René Gaillard; Referee: Aurélien Petit

12 March 2022 28	Ajaccio	0–1	Bastia	Ajaccio
15:00 CET (UTC+1)		Report	Boyer (yellow card) 10'; Robic (yellow card) 26'; Roncaglia 42'; Palun (yellow card) 49'; Sylla (yellow card) 85'; Santelli (yellow card) 87'	Stadium: Stade François Coty; Referee: Hakim Ben El Hadj

15 March 2022 29	Quevilly-Rouen	0–0	Ajaccio	Le Petit-Quevilly
19:00 CET (UTC+1)	Gbelle (yellow card) 44'	Report	Barreto (yellow card) 64'; Krasso (yellow card) 69'	Stadium: Stade Robert Diochon; Referee: Gaël Angoula

19 March 2022 30	Ajaccio	1–0	Nîmes	Ajaccio
19:00 CET (UTC+1)	Laçi 48'; Gonzalez (yellow card) 86'	Report	Benrahou (yellow card) 90+3'	Stadium: Stade François Coty; Referee: Olivier Thual

4 April 2022 31	Nancy	0–2	Ajaccio	Tomblaine
20:45 CET (UTC+1)	Bianda (red card) 71'; Biron (yellow card) 89'	Report	Gonzalez (yellow card) 57'; Laçi (yellow card) 59'; El Idrissy 68'; Nouri (yellow card) 75'; Bayala 85'; Krasso (yellow card) 90+2'	Stadium: Stade Marcel Picot; Referee: Marc Bollengier

9 April 2022 32	Ajaccio	2–1	Pau	Ajaccio
19:00 CET (UTC+1)	Krasso 59' (yellow card) 63' (goal) 69'	Report	Essende (yellow card) 30'; Armand (yellow card) 69'; Gomis 90+4'	Stadium: Stade François Coty; Referee: Alexandre Perreau Niel

16 April 2022 33	Dijon	0–3	Ajaccio	Dijon
19:00 CET (UTC+1)		Report	Courtet 21'; Bayala 53'; Arconte (yellow card) 60', (goal) 87'; Leroy (yellow card) 85'	Stadium: Stade Gaston Gérard; Referee: Abdelatif Kherradji

19 April 2022 34	Ajaccio	2–1	Dunkerque	Ajaccio
20:00 CET (UTC+1)	Courtet 3'; Marchetti 17'	Report	Majouga 64'; Pierre (yellow card) 77'; Brahimi (yellow card) 90'	Stadium: Stade François Coty; Referee: Nicolas Rainville

22 April 2022 35	Valenciennes	0–0	Ajaccio	Valenciennes
21:00 CET (UTC+1)	Robail (yellow card) 71'; Boutoutaou (yellow card) 80'	Report	Marchetti (yellow card) 10'; Courtet (yellow card) 13'; Moussiti-Oko (yellow card) 76'	Stadium: Stade du Hainaut; Referee: Frank Schneider

30 April 2022 36	Ajaccio	2–1	Le Havre	Ajaccio
19:00 CET (UTC+1)	Courtet 9'; Barreto 21'; Marchetti (yellow card) 32'; Laçi (yellow card) 90+4'	Report	Abline 8'; Abdelli (yellow card) 44'	Stadium: Stade François Coty; Referee: Aurelien Petit

7 May 2022 37	Grenoble	1–1	Ajaccio	Grenoble
19:00 CEST (UTC+2)	Néry 39'; Monfray (yellow card) 54' (red card) 59'; Correa (yellow card) 88' de Iriondo (yellow card) 90'	Report	Nouri 64'	Stadium: Stade des Alpes; Referee: Vernice

14 May 2022 38	Ajaccio	1–0	Toulouse	Ajaccio
19:00 CET (UTC+1)	Nouri 28' (pen.)	Report	Costa (yellow card) 27'	Stadium: Stade François Coty; Referee: Bastien Dechepy

=== Coupe de France ===
12 November 2021 Round 7	Ajaccio	0–0 (3–4 p)	Orléans	Ajaccio
20:00 CET	El Idrissy (yellow card) 90+1'	Report	Keïta (yellow card) 26'; Yambéré (yellow card) 69'	Stadium: Stade François Coty; Referee: Hakim Ben El Hadj
