= 2023–24 AC Ajaccio season =

AC Ajaccio
2023–24 season
- Manager: Olivier Pantaloni
- Stadium: Stade François Coty
- Ligue 2: 15th
- Coupe de France: Eighth round
Home colours	Away colours	Third colours

The 2023–24 season was Athletic Club Ajaccio's 114th season in existence and first one back in the Ligue 2. They also competed in the Coupe de France.

== Players ==
=== First-team squad ===
As of 2 September 2023

Note: Flags indicate national team as defined under FIFA eligibility rules; some limited exceptions apply. Players may hold more than one non-FIFA nationality.

No.	Pos.	Nation	Player
1	GK	FRA	Mathieu Michel
2	DF	LUX	Maxime Chanot
3	DF	FRA	Stephen Quemper
4	MF	FRA	Mickaël Barreto
5	MF	FRA	Riad Nouri
6	MF	FRA	Thomas Mangani
7	FW	FRA	Mounaïm El Idrissy
8	MF	FRA	Vincent Marchetti (captain)
9	FW	TUN	Yoann Touzghar
10	FW	MAR	Yacine Bammou
11	FW	CIV	Ben Hamed Touré
14	FW	BFA	Cyrille Bayala
15	DF	FRA	Clément Vidal

No.	Pos.	Nation	Player
16	GK	FRA	François-Joseph Sollacaro
17	FW	FRA	Everson Pereira
18	FW	FRA	Moussa Soumano
19	MF	FRA	Valentin Jacob
20	MF	COM	Mohamed Youssouf
21	DF	GLP	Cédric Avinel
22	DF	FRA	Julien Benhaim
26	MF	FRA	Tim Jabol-Folcarelli
27	DF	FRA	Thibault Campanini
30	GK	FRA	Ghjuvanni Quilichini
31	DF	ROU	Tony Strata
37	MF	ALG	Mehdi Puch-Herrantz
38	MF	ALG	Ivane Chegra

== Transfers ==
=== In ===
No.	Pos.	Player	Transferred from	Fee	Date	Source
37	MF	(Algeria) Mehdi Puch-Herrantz	(France) Ajaccio B		1 July 2023	
38	FW	(Algeria) Ivane Chegra	(France) Ajaccio B		1 July 2023	
26	MF	(France) Tim Jabol-Folcarelli	(France) Le Puy	Free	1 July 2023	
1	GK	(France) Mathieu Michel	(France) Chamois Niort	Free	1 July 2023	
11	FW	(Ivory Coast) Ben Hamed Touré	(France) Ajaccio B		1 July 2023	
17	MF	(France) Everson Junior	(France) Ajaccio B		1 July 2023	
10	FW	(Morocco) Yacine Bammou	(Qatar) Al-Shamal SC	Free	4 July 2023	
19	MF	(France) Valentin Jacob	(France) Dijon	Undisclosed	4 July 2023	
27	DF	(France) Thibault Campanini	(France) Ajaccio B		5 July 2023	
3	DF	(France) Stephen Quemper	(France) EA Guingamp	Undisclosed	21 July 2023	
22	MF	(France) Julien Benhaim	(France) Stade Briochin	Free	3 August 2023	
2	DF	(Luxembourg) Maxime Chanot	(United States) New York City FC	Undisclosed	29 August 2023	

=== Out ===
Pos.	Player	Transferred to	Fee	Date	Source
FW	(Algeria) Youcef Belaïli	(Algeria) MC Algiers	Free	9 August 2023	
DF	(Ivory Coast) Ismaël Diallo	(Croatia) Hajduk Split	Free	12 July 2023	
MF	(France) Yanis Cimignani	(Turkey) Lugano	Free	1 July 2023	
DF	(Republic of the Congo) Fernand Mayembo	(Israel) Hapoel Haifa	Free	8 August 2023	
GK	(France) Benjamin Leroy	(France) Quevilly-Rouen	Free	1 July 2023	
DF	(Gabon) Sidney Obissa	(Belgium) Francs Borains	Free	3 August 2023	
MF	(France) Mathieu Coutadeur	(France) Le Mans FC	Free	1 July 2023	
FW	(France) Mounaïm El Idrissy	(Belgium) KV Kortrijk	Undisclosed	6 September 2023	
FW	(Switzerland) Kevin Spadanuda	(Switzerland) FC Luzern	Undisclosed	1 July 2023	
FW	(France) Romain Hamouma	Retired		7 August 2023	
FW	(Burkina Faso) Jean Botué	Free agent		1 July 2023	
DF	(Guadeloupe) Mickaël Alphonse	Free agent		2 September 2023	
MF	(France) Florian Chabrolle	Free agent		1 July 2023	
MF	(France) Alassane N'Diaye	Free agent		1 July 2023	
DF	(Comoros) Chaker Alhadhur	Free agent		1 July 2023	
DF	(Mali) Youssouf Koné	(Belgium) RWDM	End of loan	30 June 2023	
FW	(Senegal) Moussa Djitté	(United States) Austin FC	End of loan	30 June 2023	
FW	(Brazil) Ruan Levine	(Brazil) Tombense	End of loan	30 June 2023	

== Competitions ==
=== Overall record ===
Competition	First match	Last match	Starting round	Final position	Record							
Competition	First match	Last match	Starting round	Final position	Pld	W	D	L	GF	GA	GD	Win %
Ligue 2	5 August 2023	17 May 2024	Matchday 1	15th	38	12	10	16	35	46	−11	31.58
Coupe de France	19 November 2023	9 December 2023	Seventh round	Eighth round	2	1	0	1	5	3	+2	50.00
Total					40	13	10	17	40	49	−9	32.50

Source: Soccerway

=== Ligue 2 ===
==== League table ====
Pos	Team	Pld	W	D	L	GF	GA	GD	Pts	Promotion or Relegation
13	Bastia	38	14	9	15	44	48	−4	50 (Note: Bastia were deducted 1 point due to federation decision.)	
14	Annecy	38	12	10	16	49	50	−1	46	
15	Ajaccio	38	12	10	16	35	46	−11	46	
16	Dunkerque	38	12	10	16	36	52	−16	46	
17	Troyes	38	9	14	15	42	50	−8	41	Spared from relegation

Updated to match(es) played on 17 May 2024. Source: Ligue 2
Rules for classification: 1) Points; 2) Goal difference; 3) Number of goals scored; 4) Head-to-head goal difference; 5) Fair play points

==== Results summary ====
Overall								Home						Away					
Pld	W	D	L	GF	GA	GD	Pts	W	D	L	GF	GA	GD	W	D	L	GF	GA	GD
16	6	6	4	16	15	+1	24	4	4	0	11	5	+6	2	2	4	5	10	−5

Source: Ligue 2

==== Results by round ====
Round	1	2	3	4	5	6	7	8
Ground	H	A	H	A	H	A	H	A
Result	D	W	D	L	D	L	W	D
Position	11							

Source: Ligue 2
A = Away; H = Home; W = Win; D = Draw; L = Loss

==== Matches ====
The league fixtures were unveiled on 29 June 2023.

5 August 2023 1	Ajaccio	1–1	Rodez	Ajaccio
19:00 UTC+2	Touzghar 45+5'; Youssouf (yellow card) 86'	Report	Rajot 6'; Ngouyamsa (yellow card) 18'; Younoussa (yellow card) 27'; Abdallah (yellow card) 76'	Stadium: Stade François Coty; Referee: Mikaël Lesage

12 August 2023 2	Quevilly-Rouen	0–1	Ajaccio	Le Petit-Quevilly
19:00 UTC+2	Sangaré (yellow card) 31'; Soumano (yellow card) 73'	Report	Nouri 32'; Marchetti (yellow card) 47'	Stadium: Stade Robert Diochon; Referee: Antoine Valnet

21 August 2023 3	Ajaccio	0–0	Bordeaux	Ajaccio
20:45				Stadium: Stade François Coty

2 September 2023 5	Ajaccio	2–2	Dunkerque	Ajaccio
19:00				Stadium: Stade François Coty

26 September 2023 8	Amiens	0–0	Ajaccio	Amiens
20:45

2 October 2023 9	Ajaccio	2–0	Bastia	Ajaccio
20:45

7 October 2023 10	Saint-Étienne	0–0	Ajaccio	Saint-Étienne
19:00

21 October 2023 11	Ajaccio	2–0	Pau	Ajaccio
19:00

28 October 2023 12	Concarneau	2–1	Ajaccio
19:00

4 November 2023 13	Grenoble	0–3	Ajaccio	Grenoble
19:00

11 November 2023 14	Ajaccio	1–0	Troyes	Ajaccio
19:00

25 November 2023 15	Annecy	2–0	Ajaccio	Annecy
19:00

2 December 2023 16	Ajaccio	1–1	Angers	Ajaccio
19:00		Report		Stadium: Stade François Coty

5 December 2023 17	Ajaccio	v	Laval	Ajaccio
20:45		Report		Stadium: Stade François Coty; Referee: Aurélien Petit

16 December 2023 18	Auxerre	v	Ajaccio	Auxerre
19:00

19 December 2023 19	Ajaccio	v	Valenciennes	Ajaccio
20:45				Stadium: Stade François Coty
