= 2019–20 AC Ajaccio season =

AC Ajaccio
2019–20 season
- Chairman: Christian Leca
- Manager: Olivier Pantaloni
- Stadium: Stade François Coty
- Ligue 2: 3rd
- Coupe de France: Seventh round
- Coupe de la Ligue: Second round
- Top goalscorer: League: Vagner (7); All: Vagner (8)
Home colours	Away colours

The 2019–20 season was the 100th season in the existence of AC Ajaccio and the club's sixth consecutive season in the second division of French football. In addition to the domestic league, Ajaccio participated in this season's editions of the Coupe de France and the Coupe de la Ligue. The season was scheduled to cover the period from 1 July 2019 to 30 June 2020.

== Players ==
=== First-team squad ===
As of 15 January 2020.

Note: Flags indicate national team as defined under FIFA eligibility rules; some limited exceptions apply. Players may hold more than one non-FIFA nationality.

No.	Pos.	Nation	Player
1	GK	FRA	Benjamin Leroy
2	DF	FRA	Gédéon Kalulu
3	DF	CIV	Ismaël Diallo
5	MF	FRA	Lucas Pellegrini
6	MF	FRA	Mathieu Coutadeur
7	FW	BFA	Cyrille Bayala (on loan from Lens)
8	MF	MLI	Abdoulaye Keita (on loan from Olympiacos)
9	FW	FRA	Gaëtan Courtet (on loan from Lorient)
10	MF	ALB	Qazim Laçi
11	MF	FRA	Mattéo Tramoni
12	FW	GBS	Joseph Mendes
13	MF	GAB	Clech Loufilou
14	FW	FRA	Alexis Flips (on loan from Lille)

No.	Pos.	Nation	Player
18	MF	FRA	Johan Cavalli (captain)
19	FW	BEL	Hugo Cuypers (on loan from Olympiacos)
20	MF	COM	Mohamed Youssouf
21	DF	GLP	Cédric Avinel
22	MF	FRA	Kévin Lejeune
23	DF	FRA	Matthieu Huard
26	MF	GAM	Ablie Jallow (on loan from Metz)
29	FW	USA	Maki Tall
30	GK	FRA	François-Joseph Sollacaro
33	DF	FRA	Jérémy Corinus
34	FW	FRA	Félix Tomi
35	FW	FRA	Mounaïm El Idrissy
40	GK	FRA	Lucas Marsella

== Pre-season and friendlies ==
Win Draw Loss

13 July 2019 Friendly	Toulouse (France)	1–0	(France) Ajaccio	L'Union, France
11:00 CEST (UTC+2)	Bostock 50'		Avinel (yellow card) 28'; El Idrissy (yellow card) 41'	Stadium: Stade Georges Beyney; Attendance: 850; Referee: Olivier Thual

19 July 2019 Friendly	Nîmes (France)	2–2	(France) Ajaccio	Saint-Gilles, Gard, France
17:30 CEST (UTC+2)	Ripart 5', 26' (pen.)		Youssouf 45+1'; Avinel 52'	Stadium: Stade d’Espeyran

== Competitions ==
=== Overview ===
Competition	First match	Last match	Starting round	Final position	Record							
Competition	First match	Last match	Starting round	Final position	Pld	W	D	L	GF	GA	GD	Win %
Ligue 2	26 July 2019	7 March 2020	Matchday 1	3rd	28	15	7	6	38	22	+16	53.57
Coupe de France	16 November 2019		Seventh round	Seventh round	1	0	0	1	1	3	−2	0.00
Coupe de la Ligue	13 August 2019	27 August 2019	First round	Second round	2	1	0	1	4	2	+2	50.00
Total					31	16	7	8	43	27	+16	51.61

Source: Soccerway

=== Ligue 2 ===
==== League table ====
Pos	Team	Pld	W	D	L	GF	GA	GD	Pts	Promotion or Relegation
1	Lorient (C, P)	28	17	3	8	45	25	+20	54	Promotion to Ligue 1
2	Lens (P)	28	15	8	5	39	24	+15	53	Promotion to Ligue 1
3	Ajaccio	28	15	7	6	38	22	+16	52	
4	Troyes	28	16	3	9	34	25	+9	51	
5	Clermont	28	14	8	6	35	25	+10	50	

Source: Ligue 2
Rules for classification: 1) Points; 2) Goal difference; 3) Number of goals scored; 4) Head-to-head goal difference; 5) Fair play points
(C) Champions; (P) Promoted

==== Results summary ====
Overall								Home						Away					
Pld	W	D	L	GF	GA	GD	Pts	W	D	L	GF	GA	GD	W	D	L	GF	GA	GD
28	15	7	6	38	22	+16	52	6	4	4	17	12	+5	9	3	2	21	10	+11

Source: Ligue 2

==== Results by round ====
Round	1	2	3	4	5	6	7	8	9	10	11	12	13	14	15	16	17	18	19	20	21	22	23	24	25	26	27	28	29	30	31	32	33	34	35	36	37	38
Ground	H	A	H	A	H	A	H	A	H	A	H	A	H	A	H	A	A	H	A	H	A	H	A	H	A	H	A	H										
Result	D	W	L	W	W	L	D	W	W	D	D	W	W	D	D	W	W	L	L	W	W	L	W	L	W	W	D	W	C	C	C	C	C	C	C	C	C	C
Position	10	6	9	8	4	8	11	6	2	4	5	3	2	3	3	3	3	4	4	4	3	3	3	3	3	2	4	3	3	3	3	3	3	3	3	3	3	3

Source: Ligue 2
A = Away; H = Home; W = Win; D = Draw; L = Loss

==== Matches ====
The league fixtures were announced on 14 June 2019. The Ligue 2 matches were suspended by the LFP on 13 March 2020 due to COVID-19 until further notices. On 28 April 2020, it was announced that Ligue 1 and Ligue 2 campaigns would not resume, after the country banned all sporting events until September. On 30 April, The LFP ended officially the 2019–20 season.

26 July 2019 1	Ajaccio	2–2	Le Havre	Ajaccio
20:00 CEST (UTC+2)	Courtet 5', 83' (pen.)	Report	Kadewere 71' (pen.), 76'	Stadium: Stade François Coty; Referee: Benoît Millot

2 August 2019 2	Grenoble	0–1	Ajaccio	Grenoble
20:00 CEST (UTC+2)		Report	El Idrissy 87'	Stadium: Stade des Alpes; Referee: Alexandre Perreau Niel

9 August 2019 3	Ajaccio	1–2	Caen	Ajaccio
20:00 CEST (UTC+2)	Courtet 61'	Report	Deminguet 4'; Sankoh 45' (pen.)	Stadium: Stade François Coty; Referee: Benoît Bastien

16 August 2019 4	Châteauroux	0–1	Ajaccio	Châteauroux
20:00 CET (UTC+1)		Report	Courtet 9'	Stadium: Stade Gaston Petit; Referee: Aurélien Petit

23 August 2019 5	Ajaccio	1–0	Paris FC	Ajaccio
20:00 CEST (UTC+2)	Choplin 57'	Report		Stadium: Stade François Coty; Referee: Jérémie Pignard

30 August 2019 6	Auxerre	3–1	Ajaccio	Auxerre
20:00 CEST (UTC+2)	Dugimont 58' (pen.); Sakhi 60'; Sorgić 69'	Report	Coutadeur 90'	Stadium: Stade de l'Abbé-Deschamps; Referee: Sylvain Palhies

13 September 2019 7	Ajaccio	0–0	Orléans	Ajaccio
20:00 CEST (UTC+2)		Report		Stadium: Stade François Coty; Referee: Hakim Ben El Hadj

20 September 2019 8	Le Mans	2–4	Ajaccio	Le Mans
20:00 CEST (UTC+2)		Report		Stadium: MMArena; Referee: Cédric Dos Santos

27 September 2019 9	Ajaccio	2–0	Valenciennes	Ajaccio
20:00 CEST (UTC+2)	Cuypers 32', 42'	Report		Stadium: Stade François Coty; Referee: Thierry Bouille

4 October 2019 10	Lorient	0–0	Ajaccio	Lorient
20:00 CEST (UTC+2)		Report		Stadium: Stade du Moustoir

18 October 2019 11	Ajaccio	0–0	Nancy	Ajaccio
20:00 CEST (UTC+2)		Report		Stadium: Stade François Coty; Referee: Romain Lissorgue

25 October 2019 12	Sochaux	0–2	Ajaccio	Montbéliard
20:00 CET (UTC+1)		Report	Tramoni 41'; Bayala 68' (pen.)	Stadium: Stade Auguste Bonal; Referee: Sylvain Palhies

1 November 2019 13	Ajaccio	1–0	Rodez	Ajaccio
20:00 CET (UTC+1)	Laçi 56'	Report		Stadium: Stade François Coty; Referee: Bartolomeu Varela

9 November 2019 14	Guingamp	1–1	Ajaccio	Guingamp
14:45 CET (UTC+1)	Roux 90+2'	Report	Bayala 43'	Stadium: Stade de Roudourou; Referee: Karim Abed

22 November 2019 15	Ajaccio	1–1	Clermont	Ajaccio
20:00 CET (UTC+1)	Choplin 32'	Report	Grbić 53'	Stadium: Stade François Coty; Referee: Olivier Thual

29 November 2019 16	Chambly	0–2	Ajaccio	Beauvais
20:00 CET (UTC+1)		Report	Kalulu 9'; El Idrissy 83'	Stadium: Stade Pierre Brisson; Referee: Mehdi Mokhtari

3 December 2019 17	Niort	0–1	Ajaccio	Niort
21:05 CET (UTC+1)		Report	Choplin 5'	Stadium: Stade René Gaillard; Referee: Bastien Dechepy

14 December 2019 18	Ajaccio	1–2	Lens	Ajaccio
15:00 CET (UTC+1)	Laçi 12'	Report	Sotoca 57', 71'	Stadium: Stade François Coty; Referee: Amaury Delerue

21 December 2019 19	Troyes	2–1	Ajaccio	Troyes
16:00 CET (UTC+1)	Kouyaté 45+1'; Tardieu 90' (pen.)	Report	Courtet 81'	Stadium: Stade de l'Aube; Referee: Antony Gautier

10 January 2020 20	Ajaccio	3–1	Grenoble	Ajaccio
20:00 CET (UTC+1)	Courtet 39', 46'; El Idrissy 90+2'	Report	Bayala 42' (o.g.)	Stadium: Stade François Coty; Referee: Bastien Dechepy

24 January 2020 21	Caen	0–1	Ajaccio	Caen
20:00 CET (UTC+1)		Report	Youssouf 90+3'	Stadium: Stade Michel d'Ornano; Referee: Bartolomeu Varela

31 January 2020 22	Ajaccio	0–1	Châteauroux	Ajaccio
20:00 CET (UTC+1)		Report	Alhadhur 34'	Stadium: Stade François Coty; Referee: Rémi Landry

4 February 2020 23	Paris FC	2–3	Ajaccio	Paris
21:05 CET (UTC+1)		Report		Stadium: Stade Sébastien Charléty

7 February 2020 24	Ajaccio	2–3	Auxerre	Ajaccio
20:00 CET (UTC+1)	El Idrissy 11'; Coeff 32' (o.g.)	Report		Stadium: Stade François Coty; Referee: Gaël Angoula

14 February 2020 25	Orléans	0–3	Ajaccio	Orléans
20:00 CEST (UTC+2)		Report	Courtet 40', 77'; Cuypers 71'	Stadium: Stade de la Source; Referee: Alexandre Perreau Niel

21 February 2020 26	Ajaccio	2–0	Le Mans	Ajaccio
20:00 CET (UTC+1)	Bayala 41'; Coutadeur 66'	Report		Stadium: Stade François Coty; Referee: Benjamin Lepaysant

28 February 2020 27	Valenciennes	0–0	Ajaccio	Valenciennes
20:00 CET (UTC+1)		Report		Stadium: Stade du Hainaut; Referee: Sylvain Palhies

7 March 2020 28	Ajaccio	1–0	Lorient	Ajaccio
15:00 CET (UTC+1)	Bayala 52'	Report		Stadium: Stade François Coty; Referee: Eric Wattellier

13 March 2020 29	Nancy	Cancelled	Ajaccio	Tomblaine
20:00 CET (UTC+1)				Stadium: Stade Marcel Picot

1 May 2020 36	Lens	Cancelled	Ajaccio	Lens
CET (UTC+1)				Stadium: Stade Bollaert-Delelis

=== Coupe de France ===
16 November 2019 Seventh round	US Saint-Flour	3–1	Ajaccio	Saint-Flour
14:00 CET	Coutarel 10'; Jusserandot 62'; Raoul 90+4'	Report	Cavalli 20'	Stadium: Stade René Jarlier; Attendance: 2,500; Referee: Cédric Dos Santos

=== Coupe de la Ligue ===
27 August 2019 Second round	Nancy	1–0	Ajaccio	Tomblaine
18:45 CEST (UTC+2)	Dembélé 67'			Stadium: Stade Marcel Picot; Attendance: 5,071; Referee: Arnaud Baert
