= Vincent Marchetti =

French footballer (born 1997)

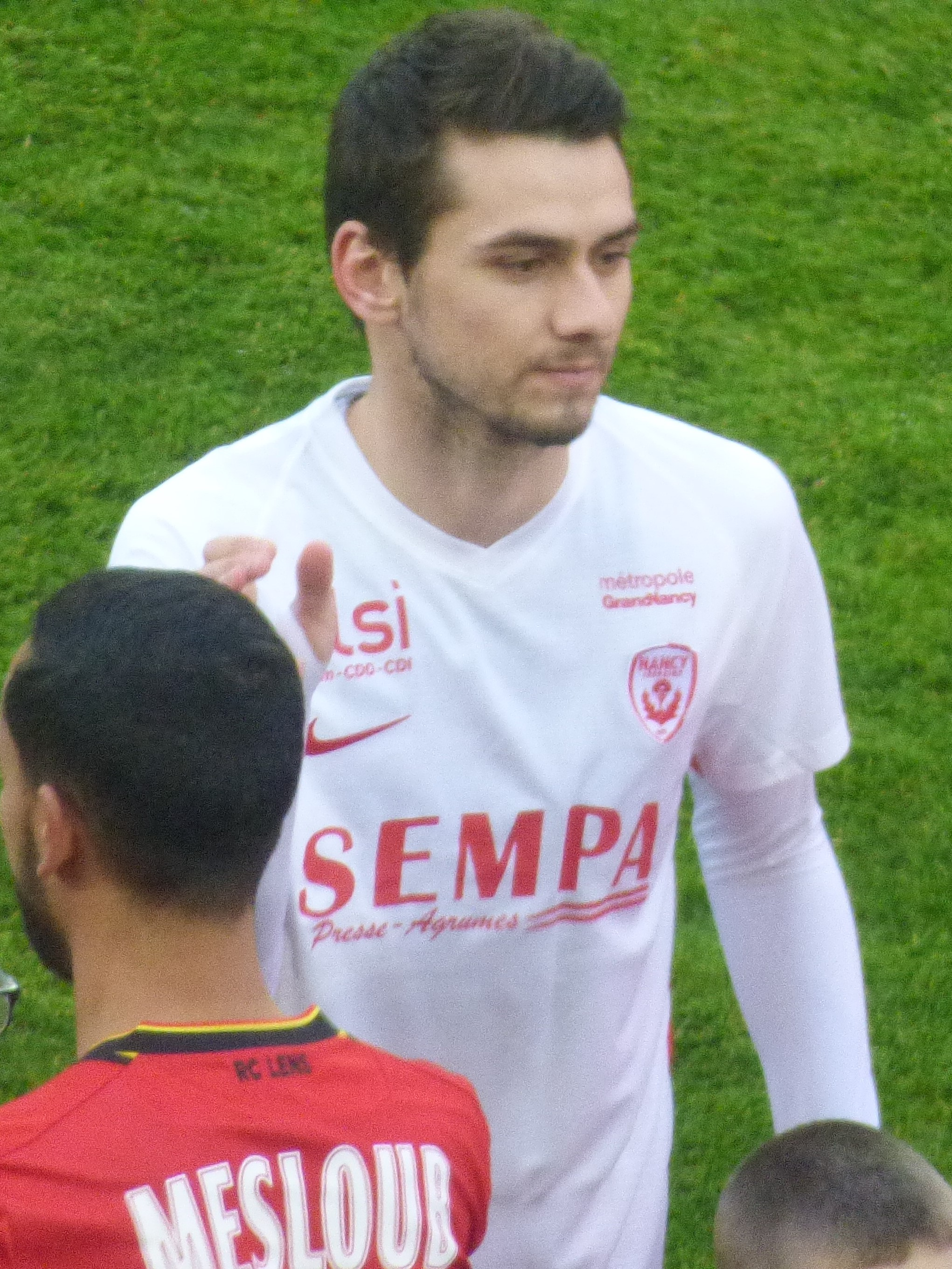
- Marchetti with Nancy in 2019

Personal information
- Date of birth: 4 July 1997 (age 29)
- Place of birth: Ajaccio, France
- Height: 1.81 m (5 ft 11 in)
- Position: Defensive midfielder

Team information
- Current team: Paris FC
- Number: 4

Youth career
- 2003–2010: Gazélec Ajaccio
- 2010–2015: Ajaccio

Senior career*
Years	Team	Apps	(Gls)
2014–2015	Ajaccio B	15	(4)
2015–2016	Ajaccio	28	(3)
2016–2019	Nancy B	9	(1)
2016–2020	Nancy	59	(2)
2020–2024	Ajaccio	94	(2)
2024–	Paris FC	59	(4)

International career
2016	France U19	1	(0)
- * Club domestic league appearances and goals as of 19 May 2026

Vincent Marchetti (born 4 July 1997) is a French professional footballer who plays as a defensive midfielder for Ligue 1 club Paris FC.

== Career ==
A product of Gazélec Ajaccio's and Ajaccio's youth systems, he made his senior debut with AC Ajaccio on 31 July 2015, coming on as a substitute for Riad Nouri in the 0–0 draw with Dijon at the Stade François Coty.

On 16 July 2016, Marchetti signed for Ligue 1 club Nancy due to Ajaccio having to sell him to escape relegation from the Direction Nationale du Contrôle de Gestion (DNCG).

On 29 January 2024, Marchetti joined Paris FC on a 2.5-year contract.

== Career statistics ==
As of match played 10 May 2025

Appearances and goals by club, season and competition
Club	Season	League			National cup		League cup		Other		Total	
Club	Season	Division	Apps	Goals	Apps	Goals	Apps	Goals	Apps	Goals	Apps	Goals
Ajaccio B	2014–15	CFA 2	9	1	—		—		—		9	1
Ajaccio B	2015–16	CFA 2	6	3	—		—		—		6	3
Ajaccio B	Total		15	4	—		—		—		15	4
Ajaccio	2015–16	Ligue 2	28	3	3	0	2 (Note: Appearance(s) in the Coupe de la Ligue)	0	—		33	3
Nancy B	2016–17	CFA 2	4	0	—		—		—		4	0
Nancy B	2017–18	National 3	1	0	—		—		—		1	0
Nancy B	2018–19	National 3	4	1	—		—		—		4	1
Nancy B	Total		9	1	—		—		—		9	1
Nancy	2016–17	Ligue 1	17	0	1	0	1	0	—		19	0
Nancy	2017–18	Ligue 2	10	0	1	0	0	0	—		11	0
Nancy	2018–19	Ligue 2	28	2	1	0	2	0	—		31	2
Nancy	2019–20	Ligue 2	4	0	0	0	0	0	—		4	0
Nancy	Total		59	2	3	0	3	0	—		65	2
Ajaccio	2020–21	Ligue 2	24	0	2	0	—		—		26	0
Ajaccio	2021–22	Ligue 2	24	1	1	0	—		—		25	1
Ajaccio	2022–23	Ligue 1	31	0	1	0	—		—		32	0
Ajaccio	2023–24	Ligue 2	15	1	1	1	—		—		16	2
Ajaccio	Total		94	2	5	1	—		—		98	3
Paris FC	2023–24	Ligue 2	8	0	0	0	—		1 (Note: Appearance in the Ligue 2 promotion play-offs)	0	9	0
Paris FC	2024–25	Ligue 2	28	2	1	0	—		—		29	2
Paris FC	Total		36	2	1	0	—		1	0	38	2
Career total			241	14	12	1	5	0	1	0	259	15
