= François-Joseph Sollacaro =

French footballer (born 1994)

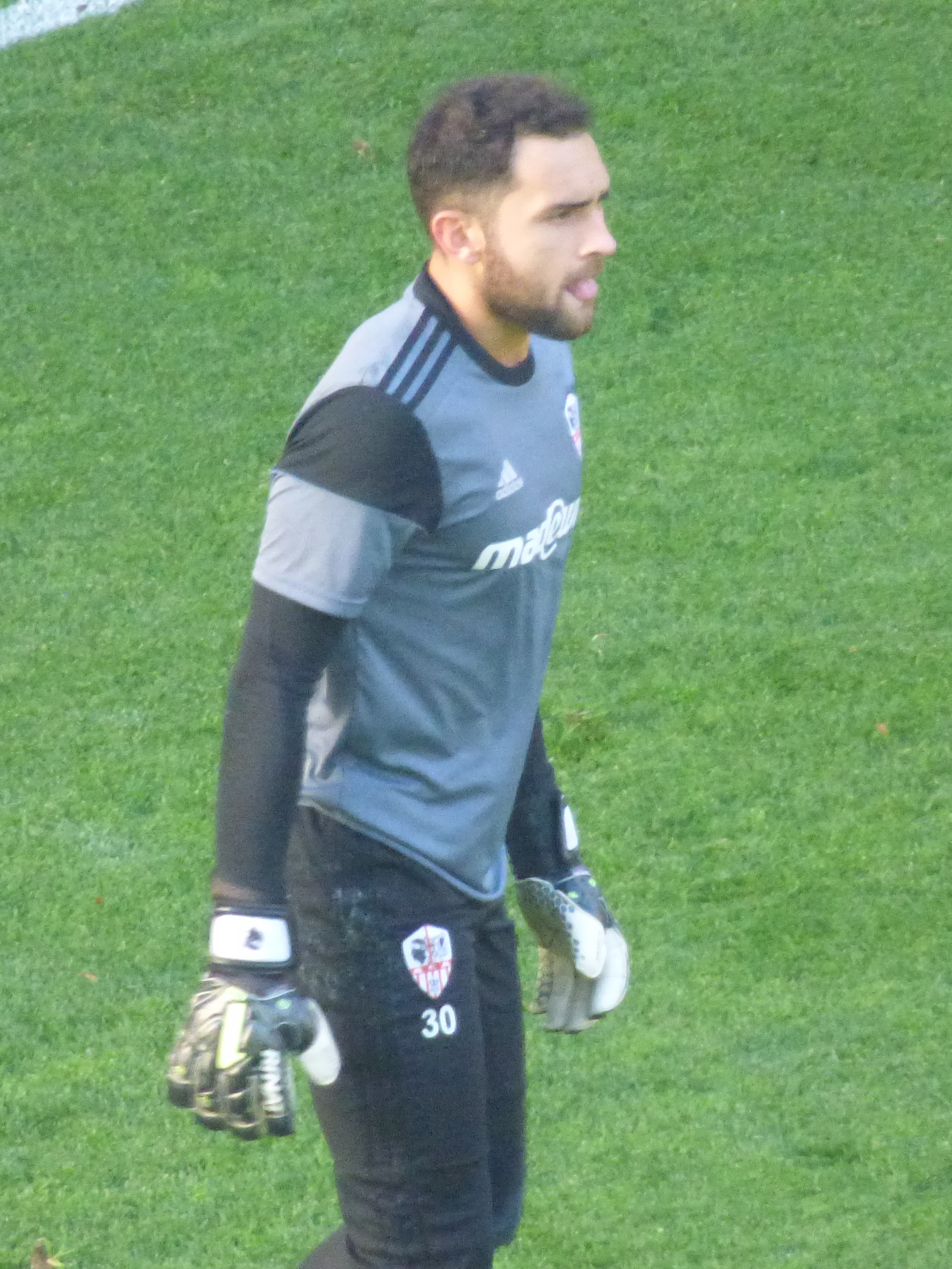
- Sollacaro with Ajaccio in 2018

Personal information
- Full name: François-Joseph Sollacaro
- Date of birth: 21 March 1994 (age 32)
- Place of birth: Ajaccio, France
- Height: 1.82 m (6 ft 0 in)
- Position: Goalkeeper

Youth career
- 2003–2013: Ajaccio

Senior career*
Years	Team	Apps	(Gls)
2013–2023	Ajaccio B	86	(0)
2014–2025	Ajaccio	65	(0)

International career
- Corsica
- * Club domestic league appearances and goals as of 12 May 2025

François-Joseph Sollacaro (born 21 March 1994) is a French professional footballer who plays as a goalkeeper.

== Career statistics ==
As of match played 8 February 2025

Appearances and goals by club, season and competition
Club	Season	League			National cup		Other		Total	
Club	Season	Division	Apps	Goals	Apps	Goals	Apps	Goals	Apps	Goals
Ajaccio B	2012–13	CFA 2	4	0	—		—		4	0
Ajaccio B	2013–14	CFA 2	3	0	—		—		3	0
Ajaccio B	2014–15	CFA 2	18	0	—		—		18	0
Ajaccio B	2015–16	CFA 2	9	0	—		—		9	0
Ajaccio B	2016–17	CFA 2	19	0	—		—		19	0
Ajaccio B	2017–18	National 3	13	0	—		—		13	0
Ajaccio B	2018–19	National 3	6	0	—		—		6	0
Ajaccio B	2019–20	National 3	5	0	—		—		5	0
Ajaccio B	2020–21	National 3	2	0	—		—		2	0
Ajaccio B	2021–22	National 3	5	0	—		—		5	0
Ajaccio B	2022–23	National 3	1	0	—		—		1	0
Ajaccio B	2023–24	National 3	1	0	—		—		1	0
Ajaccio B	Total		86	0	—		—		86	0
Ajaccio	2013–14	Ligue 1	0	0	—		—		0	0
Ajaccio	2014–15	Ligue 2	0	0	0	0	0	0	0	0
Ajaccio	2015–16	Ligue 2	0	0	0	0	0	0	0	0
Ajaccio	2016–17	Ligue 2	0	0	0	0	0	0	0	0
Ajaccio	2017–18	Ligue 2	0	0	1	0	0	0	1	0
Ajaccio	2018–19	Ligue 2	0	0	1	0	0	0	1	0
Ajaccio	2019–20	Ligue 2	0	0	1	0	0	0	1	0
Ajaccio	2020–21	Ligue 2	5	0	1	0	—		6	0
Ajaccio	2021–22	Ligue 2	8	0	1	0	—		9	0
Ajaccio	2022–23	Ligue 1	6	0	2	0	—		8	0
Ajaccio	2023–24	Ligue 2	17	0	0	0	—		17	0
Ajaccio	2024–25	Ligue 2	21	0	0	0	—		21	0
Ajaccio	Total		57	0	7	0	0	0	64	0
Career total			143	0	7	0	0	0	150	0
