= Qazim Laçi =

Albanian footballer (born 1996)

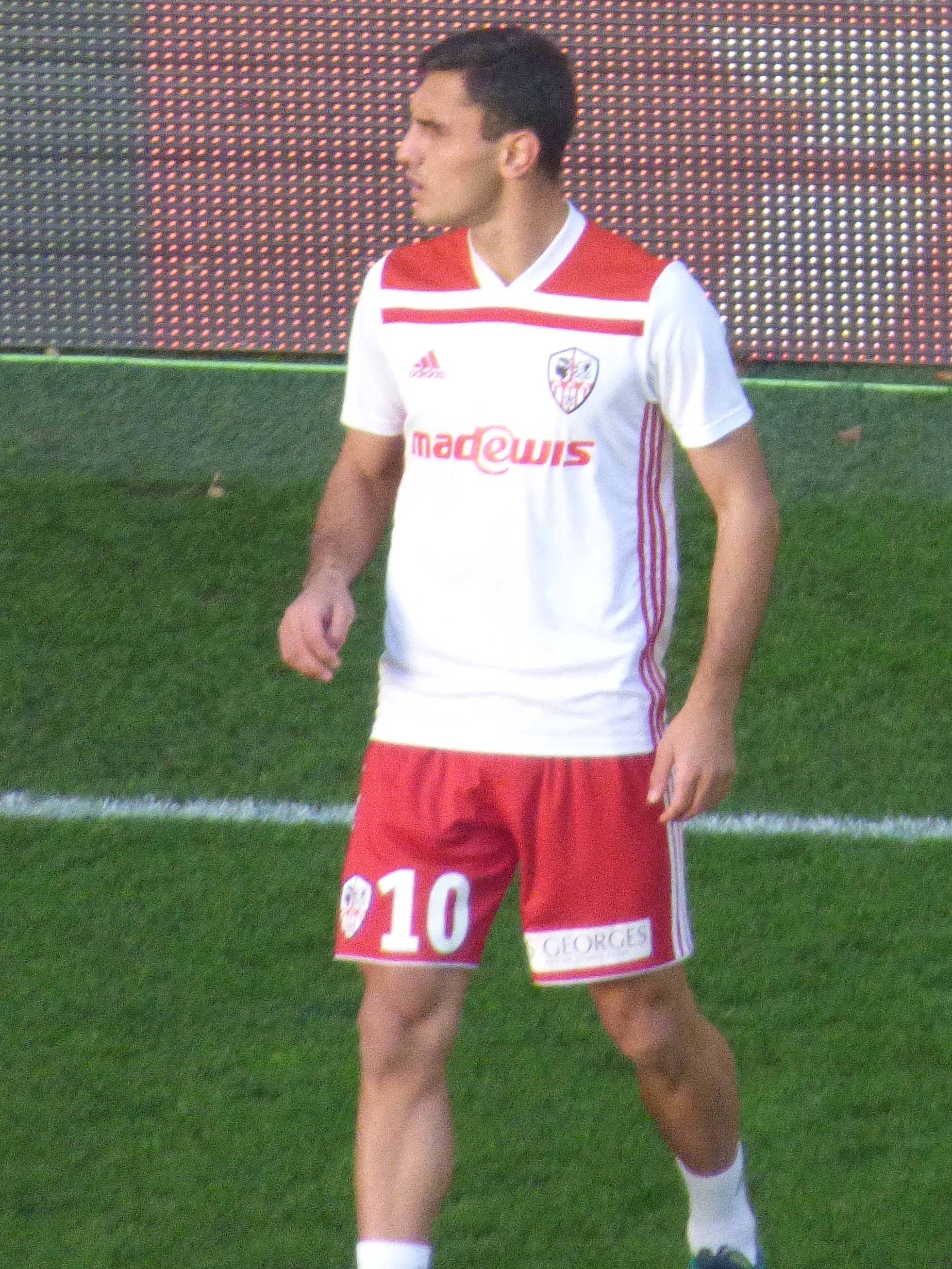
- Laçi with Ajaccio in 2018

Personal information
- Date of birth: 19 January 1996 (age 30)
- Place of birth: Peshkopi, Albania
- Height: 1.75 m (5 ft 9 in)
- Positions: Central midfielder; defensive midfielder

Team information
- Current team: Çaykur Rizespor
- Number: 20

Youth career
- 2012–2016: Olympiacos

Senior career*
Years	Team	Apps	(Gls)
2015–2018	Olympiacos	0	(0)
2016	→ APOEL (loan)	0	(0)
2017	→ Levadiakos (loan)	10	(0)
2017	→ Ajaccio B (loan)	1	(0)
2017–2018	→ Ajaccio (loan)	21	(3)
2018–2019	Ajaccio B	3	(1)
2018–2022	Ajaccio	116	(7)
2022–2025	Sparta Prague	75	(4)
2025–	Çaykur Rizespor	44	(11)

International career^{‡}
2012	Albania U17	1	(0)
2014	Albania U19	3	(0)
2015–2018	Albania U21	20	(1)
2020–	Albania	50	(4)
- * Club domestic league appearances and goals as of 21 November 2026 ‡ National team caps and goals as of 15 November 2026

Qazim Laçi (born 19 January 1996) is an Albanian professional footballer who plays as a central midfielder for Süper Lig club Çaykur Rizespor and the Albania national team.

Raised in Greece from a young age, Laçi began his career with Olympiacos, and had loan spells with APOEL, Levadiakos and Ajaccio before joining Ajaccio permanently in 2018, helping the team achieve promotion to Ligue 1 in the 2021–22 season. He later played for Sparta Prague, winning two Czech First League titles and the Czech Cup, before signing for Turkish club Çaykur Rizespor in 2025.

He represented Albania at youth and senior level, including at UEFA Euro 2024.

== Club career ==
=== Early career ===
Laçi was born in Peshkopi, Albania, and is of origin from Laç, reflected in his surname, before moving with his family to Greece at a young age. His family was placed in Galatsi and he began his youth career in with Olympiacos, where he progressed through the academy system.

Laçi was part of the Olympiacos U19 squad that competed in the inaugural 2013–14 UEFA Youth League, making five appearances as the team was eliminated in the group stage. In the 2014–15 UEFA Youth League, he became a regular starter, scoring four goals in the group stage, including against Malmö and Juventus, and converted a penalty in the shoot-out against Shakhtar Donetsk as Olympiacos were eliminated after a 1–1 draw. He also featured in the 2015–16 UEFA Youth League as one of three overaged players, making five appearances as Olympiacos finished level on points with Arsenal and Bayern Munich but placed third on head-to-head record.

=== Olympiacos ===
For the first time Laçi was included in the Olympiacos first team squad for the 2014–15 Greek Cup semi-final against Apollon Smyrnis on 8 April 2015 by coach Vítor Pereira, but did not feature in the match. He was again included in the squad for the second leg three weeks later, but remained unused as Olympiacos progressed with a 4–1 aggregate victory after a 1–1 draw. In the 2015–16 season, Laçi was included in the matchday squad for a 2015–16 UEFA Champions League group stage fixture against Dinamo Zagreb on 20 October 2015, marking his first involvement in a senior UEFA Champions League match. He made his professional debut on 3 February 2016 under coach Marco Silva in a 2015–16 Greek Cup quarter-final against Asteras Tripolis, coming on as a late substitute.

==== Loan spells (2016–17 season) ====
On 16 June 2016, Laçi joined Cypriot champions APOEL on a one-year loan. However, he did not make any official appearances and his loan was terminated on 4 January 2017, after which he returned to Olympiacos.

On 8 January 2017, Laçi was loaned to Levadiakos. He made his debut on 14 January 2017 in a match against Veria, coming on as a late substitute in a 2–0 loss. Following his debut, he made his first start on 19 January 2017, playing 77 minutes in a 3–0 away defeat against PAOK, marking his second consecutive appearance for the club. After a run of poor results without a win, he lost his place in the starting lineup and was used sparingly as a substitute, finishing his loan spell with a total of 10 appearances, including 5 starts and 5 as a substitute. The team finished 14th in the 2016–17 Super League Greece with 26 points and would have been relegated, but retained their top-flight status after Iraklis (29 points) were relegated due to financial issues.

=== Ajaccio ===
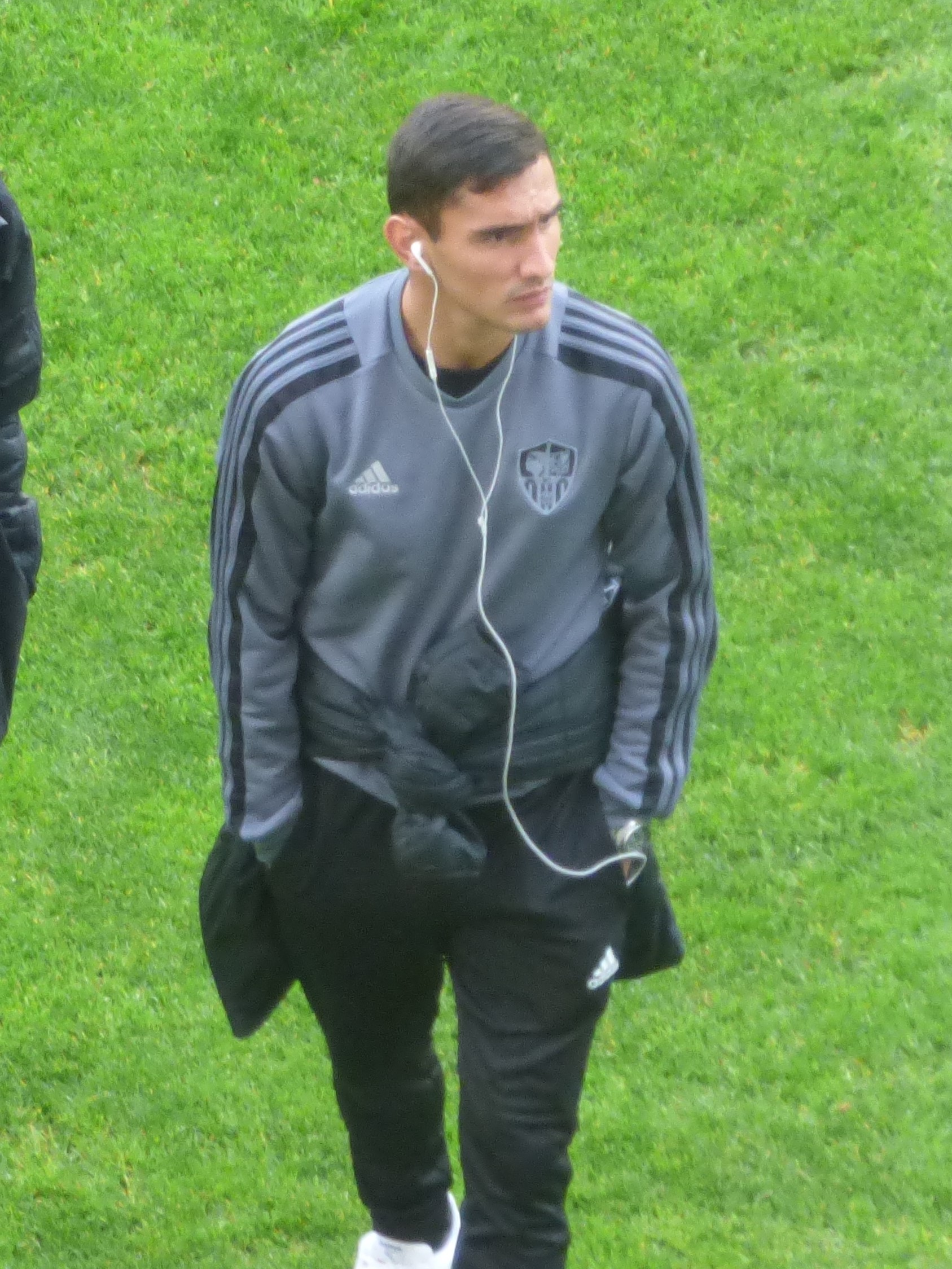
Laçi after a game with Ajaccio in 2018

In July 2017, Laçi joined Ligue 2 club Ajaccio on loan for the 2017–18 season. He made his debut on 6 August 2017 in the 2017–18 Ligue 2 matchday 2 against Brest, coming on in the 70th minute. During his first season, Laçi was mainly used as a substitute, although he also made five starts in his 21 league appearances. He scored his first goal for the club on 18 August 2017 against Paris, coming on as a substitute in the 66th minute for fellow goalscorer Johan Cavalli, sealing a 2–0 victory with a counter-attack goal. On 23 October 2017, he scored his second goal in a 2–0 derby win over Gazélec Ajaccio, coming on in the 83rd minute and scoring just two minutes later. On 19 April 2018, after a two-month absence due to a leg injury, Laçi returned by scoring in Ajaccio's 2–0 win against Nancy, coming on as a substitute in the 70th minute and scoring the opening goal four minutes later. Ajaccio finished third in the 2017–18 Ligue 2 after a 2–2 draw against Chamois Niort on the final matchday on 11 May 2018, officially qualifying for the promotion play-off semi-final. On 20 May 2018, Laçi scored in the penalty shoot-out as Ajaccio defeated Le Havre 5–3 after a 2–2 draw in the Ligue 2 promotion play-off semi-final, helping the club reach the Ligue 1 relegation play-off final. In a two-legged tie against Toulouse, Laçi appeared as a substitute in the 3–0 first-leg defeat and started in the 1–0 second-leg loss, as Ajaccio were beaten 4–0 on aggregate and missed promotion to Ligue 1.

Following the end of his loan spell, Laçi completed a permanent move from Olympiacos to Ajaccio in July 2018. During the 2018–19 Ligue 2 season, Laçi initially had limited playing time, alternating between substitute appearances and occasional starts during the opening months until October, mainly due to competition for places in midfield under manager Olivier Pantaloni; he then established himself mainly as a starter until early March 2019, before later falling back to a secondary role from the bench for the remainder of the campaign.

On 13 August 2019, Laçi scored in a 4–1 win over Valenciennes in the first round of the 2019–20 Coupe de la Ligue, helping Ajaccio advance to the next stage of the competition. Throughout the 2019–20 Ligue 2 season, Laçi was a regular starter, with only occasional substitutions and very limited absences early in the campaign before becoming consistently ever-present from mid-season onwards and regularly completing full matches until the season was suspended due to the COVID-19 pandemic, establishing himself as a reliable midfield presence, and in April 2020 he stated that he had enjoyed an excellent season with Ajaccio, having been a key player in Ligue 2 and finishing the campaign with 3 goals in 27 league appearances. On 1 November 2019, Laçi scored the winning goal against Rodez, securing a valuable 1–0 victory that temporarily moved the club to the top of the Ligue 2 standings. On 19 December 2019, Laçi was included in the Team of the Week after scoring for Ajaccio despite his team being defeated by Lens during matchday 18. On 4 February 2020, Laçi scored in a 3–2 away win over Paris, netting with a volley for his third goal of the season as Ajaccio remained in the promotion race for Ligue 1. On 8 March 2020, Laçi provided an assist in Ajaccio's important Ligue 2 title match against Lorient, delivering the cross for the opening goal in the 52nd minute in an eventual victory. On 12 March 2020, due to the COVID-19 pandemic, the season was suspended indefinitely, with Ajaccio in third place at the time and on 30 April 2020, the LFP declared the championship concluded with no remaining matches to be played, applying the standings as they stood, and thus the promotion play-offs were cancelled, meaning the club missed the chance to compete for promotion to Ligue 1.

On 11 August 2020, Laçi signed a new three-year contract with Ajaccio, keeping him at the club until 2023. During the 2020–21 Ligue 2 season, Laçi recorded a personal best in appearances for Ajaccio, featuring in 36 matches, the majority as a starter, and remained a regular presence in midfield despite frequent substitutions, while also receiving a career-high number of yellow cards for the club. The team, however, experienced difficulties in attack throughout the campaign, registering one of the lowest goal tallies in the league and finishing in mid-table. On 18 April 2021, Laçi scored his only goal of the season in a 3–0 win over Chamois Niort, sealing the result with a long-range left-footed strike from outside the box.

On 25 July 2021, Laçi scored twice in a 2–2 draw away in the opening round against Toulouse, helping his team secure a point despite playing with 10 men for around 50 minutes. Following his brace and performance, Laçi was included in the Ligue 2 Team of the Week and received an 8.6 rating from Sofascore. On 19 March 2022, he scored the only goal in a 1–0 win against Nîmes, a long-range strike that kept Ajaccio in the promotion race, and it was his third goal of the season. On 19 April 2022, Laçi provided an assist in a 2–1 win over Dunkerque, setting up the opening goal in the third minute of the match. Ajaccio ultimately finished as runners-up and secured promotion to Ligue 1. He made his Ligue 1 debut on 6 August 2022, coming on as a substitute in the 89th minute in a 2–1 loss to Lyon on the opening matchday of the 2022–23 Ligue 1 season. During the early part of the campaign, Laçi was mainly used as a substitute before earning a brief run in the starting line-up, including one full match appearance. However, he subsequently lost his place in the rotation and featured only sporadically with limited minutes, as he was not a regular selection under manager Olivier Pantaloni and faced reduced playing time throughout the first half of the season, leaving the club after five years in which he made 158 appearances and scored 11 goals across all competitions, ahead of a move to the Czech Republic to join Sparta Prague.

=== Sparta Prague ===
On 29 December 2022, Laçi signed a contract with Sparta Prague, competing in the Czech First League. He made his debut on 12 February 2023 in a 2–6 away win against Bohemians 1905 on matchday 19 of the 2022–23 Czech First League, coming on as a substitute in the final minutes of the match. A week later, he made another appearance against Jablonec, entering the match in the 29th minute and providing an assist in a 3–0 home win. Laçi featured in every remaining regular-season league match, mostly as a substitute but also making four starts, as Sparta Prague finished top of the table and qualified for the championship group after remaining unbeaten, with all victories except for two draws. During the championship group in May 2023, Laçi started in a 1–0 win, appeared as a substitute in two further victories, and played the full 90 minutes in two matches in which Sparta Prague failed to score, as the club secured its 37th league title, ending a nine-year wait, following a 0–0 draw against Slovácko on 23 May 2023. Laçi was involved also in the 2022–23 Czech Cup, starting in the quarter-final victory against Slovan Liberec, while also appearing as a substitute in the semi-final win and the final, which ended in a 2–0 defeat to Slavia Prague.

During the 2023–24 season, Laçi became a more frequent starter. On 5 August 2023, Laçi provided a long-range assist from midfield in a 5–2 win against Pardubice on matchday 3 of the 2023–24 Czech First League. On 12 August 2023, Laçi provided three assists within 10 minutes for Sparta Prague's final three goals in a 5–1 away win against Jablonec on matchday 3. On 15 August 2023 he scored his first goal from a direct free kick in a 3–3 draw against Copenhagen in the UEFA Champions League third qualifying round, though Sparta were eliminated on penalties. On 23 August 2023, he was reported to be leading the league in assists with five in his first five matches. On 31 August 2023, Laçi helped Sparta Prague overturn a first-leg 3–1 defeat against Dinamo Zagreb by winning the return leg 4–1 to qualify for the group stage of the 2023–24 UEFA Europa League, with Laçi starting the match and playing until the 68th minute. Laçi featured regularly for Sparta Prague throughout the Europa League campaign, appearing in every stage of the competition and starting in most matches across both the group stage and knockout rounds, before the club was eliminated by Liverpool in the round of 16 with an 11–2 aggregate defeat. On 30 September 2023, Laçi scored his first league goal, after just two minutes in a 2–1 win against Viktoria Plzeň on matchday 10. On 14 December 2023, Laçi provided an assist and was named player of the match in Sparta Prague's 3–1 win over Aris Limassol in the final group stage match of the Europa League, later being included in the competition's Team of the Round for matchday six. On 17 December 2023, Laçi came on as a substitute in Sparta Prague's 2–1 comeback win over Teplice and contributed to the equalising goal during the second half. Laçi made a total of 27 league appearances as Sparta Prague completed the domestic double by winning the league title. During the 2023–24 Czech Cup campaign, Laçi started in the 3–2 quarter-final win over Slavia Prague and played the full 90 minutes in the 2–1 victory against Viktoria Plzeň in the final on 22 May 2024, helping the club complete a domestic double in a season in which he was described as a key player.

On 31 July 2024, Laçi assisted a goal in Sparta Prague's 4–2 home victory over Shamrock Rovers in the second qualifying round of the 2024–25 UEFA Champions League, helping his side progress to the next round 6–2 on aggregate. He featured regularly during the qualifying campaign until the play-off round, where Sparta Prague defeated Malmö FF over two legs to qualify for the league phase. On 30 October 2024, Laçi provided an assist in the 2024–25 Czech Cup third round 4–0 win over Zbrojovka Brno. He went on to play regularly as a starter in each subsequent round of the cup campaign, including the final, where Sparta Prague were defeated 3–1 by Sigma Olomouc. On 18 September 2024, Laçi made his Champions League debut in Sparta Prague's opening league phase match against Red Bull Salzburg, scoring in a 3–0 victory. Following the debut, Laçi continued to feature regularly throughout the league phase, starting in most matches and appearing as a substitute on one occasion; Sparta Prague, however, struggled for results thereafter, recording only one further point in a 1–1 draw in the following round and scoring just three goals across their remaining six matches of the campaign. Sparta Prague finished the league phase with four points and placed 31st out of the 36 participating teams. On 30 November 2024, Laçi provided his first assist of the league season in his 12th appearance in a 1–1 draw against Dukla Prague. On 4 December 2024, Laçi scored from a free kick and provided an assist in a 4–1 league win against Karviná. On 17 December 2024, Laçi provided two assists in a 2–1 win against Jablonec, setting up both goals and being included in the Team of the Week. On 22 February 2025, Laçi scored his second league goal of the 2024–25 season in his 19th league appearances in a 2–0 win against České Budějovice, opening the scoring in the 64th minute. Following that performance, Laçi was included in the Team of the Week with a rating of 9.2. On 18 March 2025, Laçi was included in the Team of the Week with a rating of 7.8 following his performance in a 1–0 away defeat against Liberec. On 30 March 2025, Laçi provided an assist in a 4–2 home defeat against Viktoria Plzeň, delivering a pass in the 8th minute. On 25 May 2025, Laçi scored in a 1–1 away draw against Sigma Olomouc, netting the equaliser in their final league match of the season, securing the place in the UEFA Conference League for the next season.

=== Çaykur Rizespor ===
On 20 July 2025, Laçi signed a three-year contract with Turkish Süper Lig club Çaykur Rizespor. He made his debut on 10 August 2025 in a 0–3 home defeat to Göztepe in the opening matchday of the 2025–26 Süper Lig, starting the match and being substituted in the 68th minute. Throughout the league season, he was a regular starter for the team, featuring in the majority of matches and usually playing the full 90 minutes, never appearing for less than 60 minutes, while missing two matches due to suspension. On 4 October 2025, he provided two assists in a 2–5 away defeat against Antalyaspor, setting up his team's goals in the 4th and 48th minutes. On 23 November 2025, he scored a free-kick goal to double his team's lead in an eventual 2–5 home defeat against Fenerbahçe. On 7 December 2025, he provided an assist in a 1–1 away draw against Konyaspor. On 13 December 2025, he scored from the penalty spot in first-half stoppage time to give his team a 1–0 home win against Eyüpspor. In the 2025–26 Turkish Cup, he first appeared in the fourth round in December 2025 and later featured in the group stage at the beginning of 2026, making three substitute appearances in four matches as the team recorded a 5–2 win over Gaziantep and one draw, eventually finishing sixth out of eight teams and being eliminated. On 20 January 2026, he scored his third league goal of the season, converting a penalty in a 3–1 away defeat against Göztepe. On 31 January 2026, he provided an assist in a 2–2 draw against Başakşehir, registering his fourth assist of the league season. On 8 March 2026, he scored the only goal of the match, converting a penalty in the 10th minute to secure a 1–0 home win against Antalyaspor. On 9 April 2026, Laçi scored once and provided two assists in a 4–1 victory over Samsunspor, delivering one of his best performances for the club. On 13 April 2026, he scored in a 2–1 home win against Gaziantep, netting from the edge of the box following a corner kick and playing a decisive role in securing the victory. On 1 May 2026, Laçi scored a goal and provided an assist in a 3–2 win over Konyaspor on matchday 32. He finished the league campaign with 32 league, being substituted off 11 times, while scoring 7 goals, including 3 penalties, and providing 9 assists.

On 15 August 2026, Laçi scored the winning goal from the penalty spot in a 1–0 away victory over Konyaspor in the opening match of the 2026–27 Süper Lig season.

== International career ==
Laçi first represented the Albania U17 in the 2013 UEFA European Under-17 Championship qualifying round in October 2012, before joining the Albania U19 and playing every minute of their three matches in the 2015 UEFA European Under-19 Championship qualification in November 2014, as Albania lost all three and finished bottom of the group. Laçi continued with the Albania U21, featuring in the 2017 and 2019 UEFA European Under-21 Championship qualification campaigns, scoring once and earning 15 competitive caps and 21 appearances overall, making him one of the team's most-capped players.

=== Senior ===
On 7 September 2020, Laçi made his debut for the Albanian senior team in a 2020–21 UEFA Nations League C match against Lithuania. He made two further appearances in October, featuring in goalless draws against Kazakhstan and Lithuania, before playing the full 90 minutes in a 3–2 victory over Belarus on 18 November, as Albania finished top of the group and secured promotion to UEFA Nations League B. He scored his first senior international goal on 8 September 2021 in a 5–0 victory over San Marino during the 2022 FIFA World Cup qualification. Laçi made seven appearances in ten matches during the campaign, mostly as a starter, as Albania won all but two of its matches, both against England, and kept clean sheets in the remaining fixtures. Albania finished third in the group, two points behind Poland, and missed out on the play-off round.

During the UEFA Euro 2024 qualifying campaign, Laçi fell out of favour under Sylvinho, with the emergence of Kristjan Asllani seeing him lose his starting place; he initially made only one appearance as a late substitute in the opening game before remaining on the bench for the rest of the campaign until the final match. On 17 October 2023, he scored his second international goal in a 2–0 friendly win against Bulgaria. In the final qualifying match, he came on for the final half-hour against the Faroe Islands on 20 November, as Albania secured a goalless draw to finish top of the group for the first time in its history with a record 15 points, level with second-placed Czech Republic.

In June 2024, Laçi was included in the 26-man squad for the UEFA Euro 2024 finals in Germany. He scored in a 3–1 warm-up friendly win against Azerbaijan on 7 June, netting the third goal in the 86th minute. Laçi made his major tournament debut in the opening Group B match against Italy on 15 June, coming on as a 68th-minute substitute in a 2–1 defeat. He started the following two group matches, playing over 70 minutes in each. On 19 June, in the second group match against Croatia, he scored his first major tournament goal in the 11th minute, heading in a cross to give Albania the lead before being substituted in the 72nd minute with his side still ahead 1–0; Croatia then scored twice in quick succession before Albania equalised in stoppage time to secure a 2–2 draw. In the final group match against Spain on 24 June, Laçi played 71 minutes as Albania lost 1–0 to a 13th-minute goal and were eliminated from the tournament.

During the 2026 FIFA World Cup qualification, Laçi was a regular starter for Albania in Group K, usually being substituted in the second half, as the team recorded four wins without conceding, two draws and two defeats to England. Albania secured a place in the play-offs for the first time in its history with one match remaining. In the play-off against Poland on 26 March 2026, Laçi started and played until the 82nd minute as Albania surrendered an early lead in a 2–1 defeat, ending their campaign.

== Career statistics ==
=== Club ===
As of match played 21 November 2026

Appearances and goals by club, season and competition
Club	Season	League			National cup		Other		Total	
Club	Season	Division	Apps	Goals	Apps	Goals	Apps	Goals	Apps	Goals
Olympiacos	2014–15	Super League Greece	—		0	0	—		0	0
Olympiacos	2015–16	Super League Greece	—		1	0	—		1	0
Olympiacos	Total		—		1	0	—		1	0
APOEL	2016–17	Cypriot First Division	0	0	—		—		0	0
Levadiakos	2016–17	Super League Greece	10	0	1	0	—		11	0
Ajaccio (loan)	2017–18	Ligue 2	21	3	1	0	4 (Note: Three appearances in Ligue 1 relegation/promotion play-offs, one appearance in the Coupe de la Ligue)	0	26	3
Ajaccio B (loan)	2017–18	Championnat National 3	1	0	—		—		1	0
Ajaccio	2018–19	Ligue 2	19	0	1	0	2 (Note: Appearances in the Coupe de la Ligue)	0	22	0
Ajaccio	2019–20	Ligue 2	27	3	1	0	2	1	30	4
Ajaccio	2020–21	Ligue 2	36	1	1	0	—		37	1
Ajaccio	2021–22	Ligue 2	34	3	0	0	—		34	3
Ajaccio	2022–23	Ligue 1	9	0	—		—		9	0
Ajaccio	Total		125	7	3	0	4	1	132	8
Ajaccio B	2018–19	Championnat National 3	3	1	—		—		3	1
Sparta	2022–23	Czech First League	17	0	3	0	—		20	0
Sparta	2023–24	Czech First League	27	1	2	0	14	1	43	2
Sparta	2024–25	Czech First League	31	3	5	0	14	1	50	4
Sparta	Total		75	4	10	0	28	2	113	6
Çaykur Rizespor	2025–26	Süper Lig	32	7	5	0	—		37	7
Çaykur Rizespor	2026–27	Süper Lig	12	3	—		—		12	3
Çaykur Rizespor	Total		44	11	5	0	—		49	10
Career total			289	25	21	0	36	3	346	28

=== International ===
As of match played 15 November 2026

Appearances and goals by national team and year
National team	Year	Apps	Goals
Albania	2020	5	0
Albania	2021	9	1
Albania	2022	6	0
Albania	2023	3	1
Albania	2024	13	2
Albania	2025	8	0
Albania	2026	6	0
Total		50	4

Scores and results list Albania's goal tally first, score column indicates score after each Laçi goal.

List of international goals scored by Qazim Laçi
No.	Date	Venue	Cap	Opponent	Score	Result	Competition
1	8 September 2021	Elbasan Arena, Elbasan, Albania	12	San Marino	2–0	5–0	2022 FIFA World Cup qualification
2	17 October 2023	Arena Kombëtare, Tirana, Albania	22	Bulgaria	1–0	2–0	Friendly
3	7 June 2024	Haladás Sportkomplexum, Szombathely, Hungary	27	Azerbaijan	3–0	3–1	Friendly
4	19 June 2024	Volksparkstadion, Hamburg, Germany	29	Croatia	1–0	2–2	UEFA Euro 2024

== Honours ==
Olympiacos

- Super League Greece: 2015–16
- Greek Cup: 2014–15

Sparta Prague

- Czech First League: 2022–23, 2023–24
- Czech Cup: 2023–24
