= Paolo Lebas =

French footballer (born 2003)

Personal information
- Full name: Paolo Lebas Da Silva
- Date of birth: 20 April 2003 (age 23)
- Place of birth: Tourcoing, France
- Height: 1.83 m (6 ft 0 in)
- Position: Defensive midfielder

Team information
- Current team: Lucciana
- Number: 13

Youth career
- 2011–2013: Neuville-en-Ferrain
- 2013–2021: Ajaccio

Senior career*
Years	Team	Apps	(Gls)
2021–2023	Ajaccio B	45	(4)
2021–2023	Ajaccio	2	(0)
2023–2025	Bastia B	45	(0)
2025–2026	Nîmes	0	(0)
2026–	Lucciana	0	(0)
- * Club domestic league appearances and goals as of 00:18, 22 January 2026 (UTC)

Paolo Lebas Da Silva (born 20 April 2003), known as Paolo Lebas, is a French professional footballer who plays as a defensive midfielder for Championnat National 3 club Lucianna.

== Club career ==
On 18 October 2021, Lebas made his debut for Ajaccio as a substitute in a 2–0 Ligue 2 win over Nîmes. He made his Ligue 1 debut with the club in 2–0 defeat to Nantes on 5 February 2023, coming off the bench.

== International career ==
In May and June 2018, Lebas was called up by the Portugal U15 national team. In December 2018, he received two call-ups; one for the France U16 national team, and another for the Portugal U16 national team. He would eventually join up with France to complete a three-day program at INF Clairefontaine. Lebas would continue to be called up by Portugal until April 2019, when he suffered an injury that hindered his career.

== Personal life ==
Lebas was born in France to a French father and Portuguese mother. His brother Victor is also a footballer.
