= Cyrille Bayala =

Burkinabé footballer

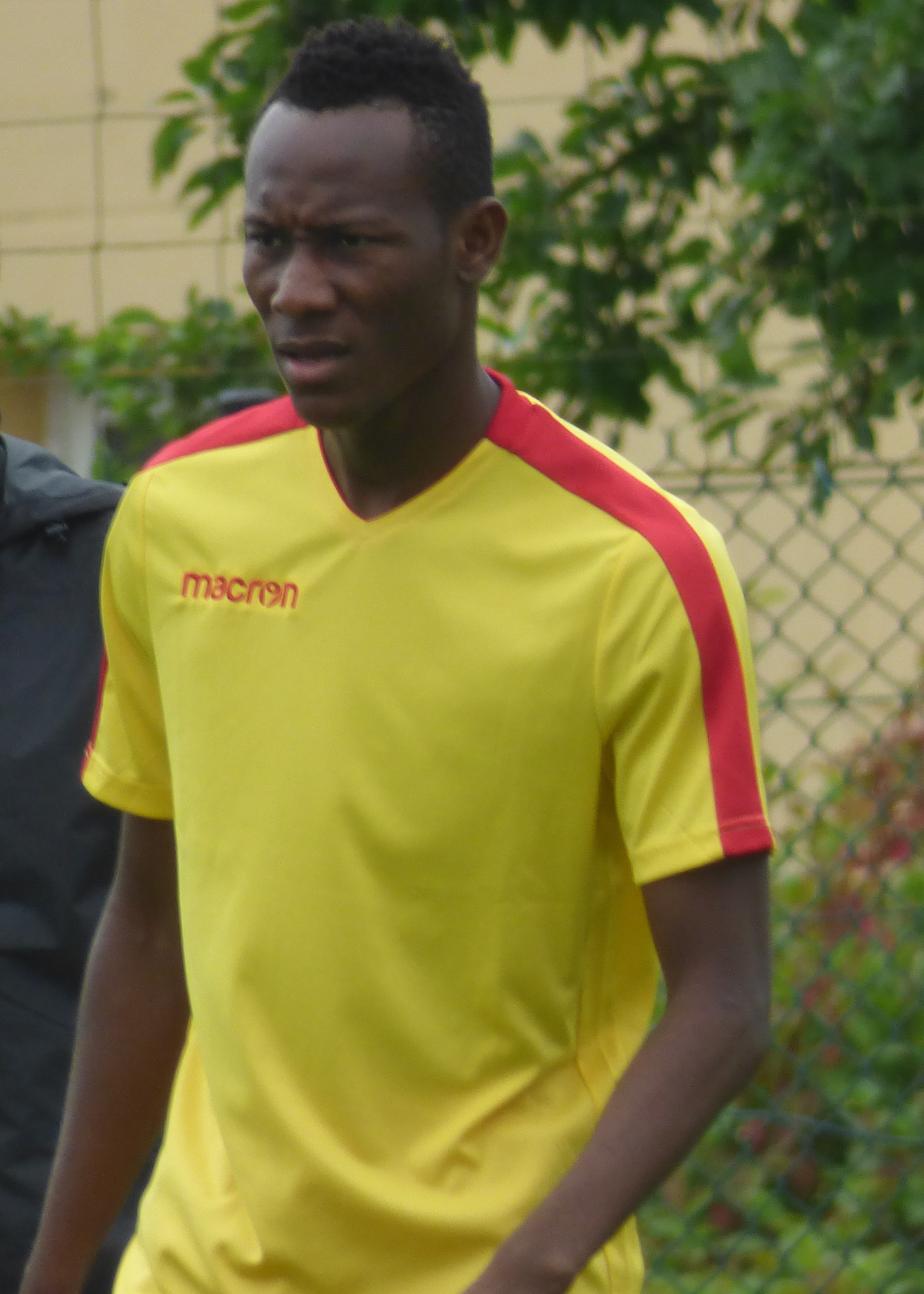
- Bayala training with Lens in 2018

Personal information
- Full name: Cyrille Barros Bayala
- Date of birth: 24 May 1996 (age 30)
- Place of birth: Ouagadougou, Burkina Faso
- Height: 1.81 m (5 ft 11 in)
- Position: Winger

Team information
- Current team: Dalian K'un City

Youth career
- ASFA Yennenga

Senior career*
| Years | Team | Apps | (Gls) |
| 2012–2014 | ASFA Yennenga | | |
| 2014–2016 | El Dakhleya | 45 | (6) |
| 2016–2017 | Sheriff Tiraspol | 29 | (7) |
| 2017–2021 | Lens | 35 | (3) |
| 2019 | → Sochaux (loan) | 14 | (2) |
| 2019–2020 | → Ajaccio (loan) | 27 | (4) |
| 2021–2024 | Ajaccio | 74 | (6) |
| 2024–2026 | Sheriff Tiraspol | 36 | (4) |
| 2026– | Dalian K'un City | 26 | (4) |

International career^{‡}
| 2013–2023 | Burkina Faso | 47 | (4) |
Medal record
Representing Burkina Faso
Africa Cup of Nations
| Third place | 2017 Gabon |
- * Club domestic league appearances and goals as of 13:00, 7 November 2026 (UTC) ‡ National team caps and goals as of 23:00, 12 September 2023 (UTC)

Cyrille Bayala (born 24 May 1996) is a Burkinabé professional footballer who plays as a winger for Chinese Super League club Dalian K'un City, and the Burkina Faso national team.

== Club career ==
On 31 August 2016, Bayala signed for Moldovan club Sheriff Tiraspol.

A year later, on 31 August 2017, Bayala signed for Lens on a four-year contract. He moved on loan to Sochaux in January until the end of the season.

On 15 January 2021, Bayala signed for French club Ajaccio.

On 9 August 2024, Bayala returned to Moldovan club Sheriff Tiraspol on a free transfer. On On 12 January 2026, Sheriff announced that Bayala had left the club.

On 19 February 2026, Bayala joined Chinese Super League club Dalian K'un City.

== International career ==
In January 2014, coach Brama Traore, invited him to be a part of the Burkina Faso squad for the 2014 African Nations Championship. The team was eliminated in the group stages after losing to Uganda and Zimbabwe and then drawing with Morocco.

Cyrille Bayala featured in the 2021 Africa Cup of Nations third place against Cameroon.

== Career statistics ==
=== Club ===
As of match played 7 November 2026

Appearances and goals by club, season and competition
| Club | Season | League | | | National cup | | League cup | | Continental | | Total | |
| Club | Season | Division | Apps | Goals | Apps | Goals | Apps | Goals | Apps | Goals | Apps | Goals |
|---|---|---|---|---|---|---|---|---|---|---|---|---|
| El Dakhleya | 2014–15 | Egyptian Premier League | 15 | 2 | | | — | | | | 15 | 2 |
| El Dakhleya | 2015–16 | Egyptian Premier League | 30 | 4 | | | — | | | | 30 | 4 |
| El Dakhleya | Total | | 45 | 6 | | | — | | | | 45 | 6 |
| Sheriff Tiraspol | 2016–17 | Divizia Națională | 23 | 6 | 3 | 2 | — | | 0 | 0 | 26 | 8 |
| Sheriff Tiraspol | 2017 | Divizia Națională | 6 | 1 | 0 | 0 | — | | 6 | 2 | 12 | 3 |
| Sheriff Tiraspol | Total | | 29 | 7 | 3 | 2 | — | | 6 | 2 | 38 | 11 |
| Lens | 2017–18 | Ligue 2 | 28 | 3 | 5 | 0 | 0 | 0 | — | | 33 | 3 |
| Lens | 2018–19 | Ligue 2 | 7 | 0 | 1 | 0 | 0 | 0 | — | | 8 | 0 |
| Lens | Total | | 35 | 3 | 6 | 0 | 0 | 0 | — | | 41 | 3 |
| Sochaux (loan) | 2018–19 | Ligue 2 | 14 | 2 | 0 | 0 | 0 | 0 | — | | 14 | 2 |
| Ajaccio (loan) | 2019–20 | Ligue 2 | 27 | 4 | 0 | 0 | 2 (Note: Appearances in the Coupe de la Ligue) | 0 | — | | 29 | 4 |
| Ajaccio | 2020–21 | Ligue 2 | 14 | 2 | 2 | 0 | — | | — | | 16 | 2 |
| Ajaccio | 2021–22 | Ligue 2 | 21 | 2 | 0 | 0 | — | | — | | 21 | 2 |
| Ajaccio | 2022–23 | Ligue 2 | 33 | 1 | 2 | 0 | — | | — | | 35 | 1 |
| Ajaccio | 2023–24 | Ligue 2 | 6 | 1 | 0 | 0 | — | | — | | 6 | 1 |
| Ajaccio | Ajaccio total | | 101 | 10 | 6 | 0 | — | | — | | 107 | 10 |
| Sheriff Tiraspol | 2024–25 | Moldovan Liga 1 | 19 | 2 | 5 | 0 | — | | 0 | 0 | 24 | 2 |
| Sheriff Tiraspol | 2025–26 | Moldovan Liga 1 | 17 | 2 | 0 | 0 | — | | 4 | 3 | 21 | 5 |
| Sheriff Tiraspol | Total | | 36 | 4 | 5 | 0 | — | | 4 | 3 | 45 | 8 |
| Dalian K'un City | 2026 | China League One | 26 | 4 | 0 | 0 | — | | — | | 26 | 4 |
| Career total | | | 286 | 36 | 18 | 2 | 2 | 0 | 10 | 5 | 316 | 44 |

=== International ===
Appearances and goals by national team and year
| National team | Year | Apps | Goals |
|---|---|---|---|
| Burkina Faso | 2013 | 2 | 0 |
| Burkina Faso | 2014 | 1 | 1 |
| Burkina Faso | 2015 | 0 | 0 |
| Burkina Faso | 2016 | 2 | 0 |
| Burkina Faso | 2017 | 8 | 0 |
| Burkina Faso | 2018 | 6 | 1 |
| Burkina Faso | 2019 | 5 | 1 |
| Burkina Faso | 2020 | 3 | 0 |
| Burkina Faso | 2021 | 4 | 0 |
| Burkina Faso | 2022 | 13 | 1 |
| Burkina Faso | 2023 | 3 | 0 |
| Total | | 47 | 4 |

Scores and results list Burkina Faso's goal tally first, score column indicates score after each Bayala goal.

List of international goals scored by Cyrille Bayala
| No. | Date | Venue | Opponent | Score | Result | Competition |
|---|---|---|---|---|---|---|
| 1 | 12 January 2014 | Athlone Stadium, Cape Town, South Africa | Uganda | 1–2 | 1–2 | 2014 African Nations Championship |
| 2 | 22 March 2018 | Stade Didier Pironi, Paris, France | Guinea-Bissau | 1–0 | 2–0 | Friendly |
| 3 | 6 September 2019 | Stade de Marrakech, Marrakesh, Morocco | Morocco | 1–0 | 1–1 | Friendly |
| 4 | 17 January 2022 | Kouekong Stadium, Bafoussam, Cameroon | Ethiopia | 1–0 | 1–1 | 2021 Africa Cup of Nations |

== Honours ==
Sheriff Tiraspol

- Moldovan National Division: 2016–17
- Moldovan Cup: 2016–17
