= Ruan Levine =

Brazilian footballer

Personal information
- Full name: Ruan Levine Camara Vitor
- Date of birth: 19 January 1999 (age 27)
- Place of birth: São Sebastião do Passé, Brazil
- Height: 1.77 m (5 ft 10 in)
- Position: Winger

Team information
- Current team: Tombense

Youth career
- 2010–2019: Vitória

Senior career*
Years	Team	Apps	(Gls)
2019–2021	Vitória	17	(2)
2020	→ Jacuipense (loan)	5	(0)
2021–2022	Jacuipense	31	(5)
2022–2023	SSA FC	0	(0)
2022–2023	→ Ajaccio II (loan)	2	(0)
2022–2023	→ Ajaccio (loan)	3	(0)
2023–	Tombense	1	(0)
- * Club domestic league appearances and goals as of 11 August 2023

Ruan Levine Camara Vitor (born 19 January 1999), formerly known as Ruan Potó, is a Brazilian professional footballer who plays as a winger for Tombense.

== Club career ==
A youth product of Vitória for 11 years, Ruan Levine started playing under the nickname "Ruan Potó", named after a Potó - a Brazilian beetle, before switching to play under his real name. He made his senior and professional debut with the club in a 3–1 Campeonato Brasileiro Série B loss to Botafogo-SP on 28 April 2019. On 1 June 2019, he signed a professional contract with Vitória until 2021. He spent the 2020 season on loan with Jacuipense. Returning to Vitória, he had several injuries and setbacks that prevented him from scoring for 2 years. He moved to Jacuipense in June 2021, where he started picking up form again. On 11 September 2022, he moved to newly established club SSA FC and shortly after joined the French Ligue 1 club Ajaccio on loan for the 2022–23 season.

== Personal life ==
Ruan Levin is married and has a daughter born in 2020.
