= Ghjuvanni Quilichini =

French footballer (born 2002)

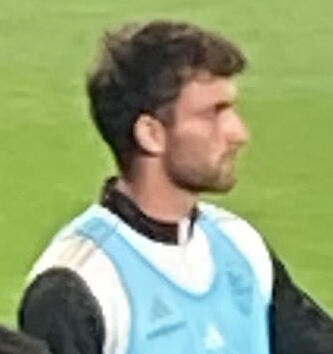
- Quilichini with Ajaccio in 2024

Personal information
- Date of birth: 1 September 2002 (age 24)
- Place of birth: Ajaccio, France
- Height: 1.82 m (6 ft 0 in)
- Position: Goalkeeper

Team information
- Current team: Bayonne
- Number: 30

Youth career
- Porto-Vecchio
- ASPV
- Sud FC
- 2017–2018: Bastia
- 2018–2019: Ajaccio

Senior career*
Years	Team	Apps	(Gls)
2019–2025	Ajaccio B	37	(0)
2021–2025	Ajaccio	6	(0)
2024	→ Avranches (loan)	8	(0)
2025–	Bayonne	7	(0)
- * Club domestic league appearances and goals as of 4 December 2025

Ghjuvanni Quilichini (born 1 September 2002) is a French professional footballer who plays as a goalkeeper for Championnat National 1 club Angoulême.

== Career ==
Quilichini is a youth product of the academies of Porto-Vecchio, ASPV, Sud FC, Bastia and Ajaccio. He began playing with Ajaccio's reserves in 2019. On 8 July 2022, he signed his first professional contract with Ajaccio for 1-year, and was promoted to third goalkeeper in their professional squad. He made his professional debut with Ajaccio in a 1–0 Ligue 1 tie with Brest on 18 September 2022.

On 2 September 2025, Quilichini signed for Bayonne.
