= Gaëtan Courtet =

French footballer (born 1989)

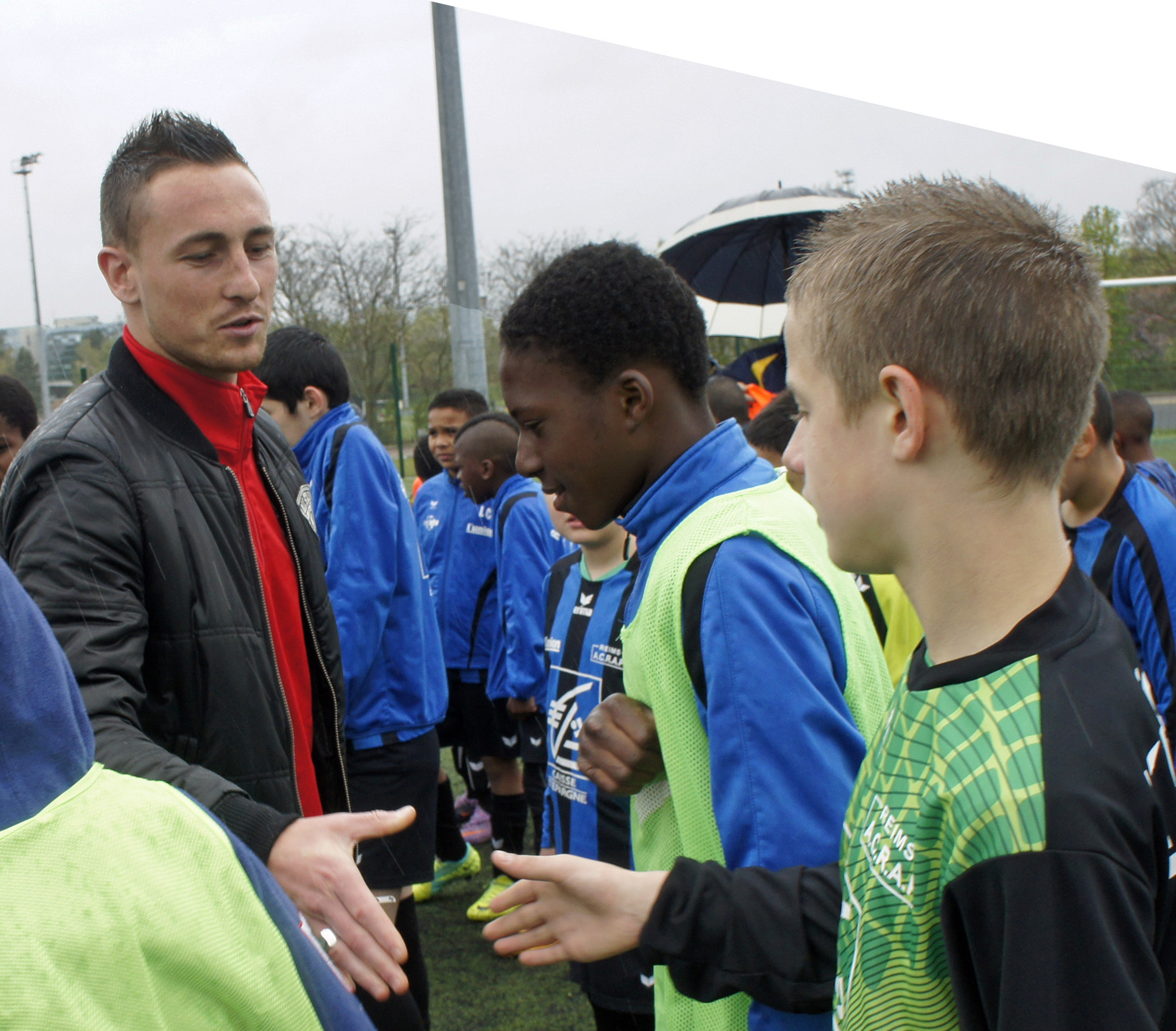
- Courtet in 2012

Personal information
- Date of birth: 22 February 1989 (age 37)
- Place of birth: Lorient, France
- Height: 1.80 m (5 ft 11 in)
- Position: Striker

Team information
- Current team: Valenciennes
- Number: 18

Youth career
- 1996–2002: Lanester
- 2002–2010: Lorient

Senior career*
Years	Team	Apps	(Gls)
2010	Lorient B	12	(7)
2010–2015	Reims	105	(18)
2014–2015	→ Brest (loan)	17	(5)
2013	Reims B	1	(0)
2015–2017	Auxerre	73	(21)
2017–2020	Lorient	53	(8)
2019–2020	→ Ajaccio (loan)	26	(10)
2018	Lorient B	2	(1)
2020–2022	Ajaccio	67	(15)
2022–2023	Guingamp	54	(11)
2024–2025	Dunkerque	50	(9)
2025–	Valenciennes	26	(6)
- * Club domestic league appearances and goals as of 23 June 2026

Gaëtan Courtet (born 22 February 1989) is a French professional footballer who plays as a striker for Ligue 3 club Valenciennes.

== Career ==
Following his first campaign with Reims, Courtet was diagnosed with cancer. After successfully undergoing treatment during the summer, he joined the team for the 2011–12 season making his long-awaited return on 16 September 2011 in a 3–2 defeat to Laval.

In July 2019, Courtet joined Ajaccio on loan for the season.

On 11 August 2022, Courtet signed with Guingamp for two years.
