= Yanis Cimignani =

French footballer (born 2002)

Personal information
- Date of birth: 22 January 2002 (age 24)
- Place of birth: Lyon, France
- Height: 1.79 m (5 ft 10 in)
- Position: Midfielder

Team information
- Current team: Lugano
- Number: 21

Youth career
- 2005–2012: US Ghisonaccia
- 2012–2017: Bastia
- 2017–2020: Ajaccio

Senior career*
| Years | Team | Apps | (Gls) |
| 2019–2022 | Ajaccio B | 9 | (2) |
| 2020–2023 | Ajaccio | 48 | (2) |
| 2023– | Lugano | 105 | (14) |

International career
| 2022 | France U20 | 6 | (2) |
- * Club domestic league appearances and goals as of 7 September 2026

Yanis Cimignani (born 22 January 2002) is a French professional footballer who plays as a midfielder for Swiss Super League club Lugano.

== Career ==
=== Early years ===
Born in Lyon, France, Cimignani grew up in Ghisonaccia on the island of Corsica. He joined the main club of his commune, US Ghisonaccia at only three years old and played there until he was eleven. He then joined Bastia where he stayed for three years but was forced to leave the club due to the demotion of the club to Championnat National 3 and as a result losing their academy licence. Cimignani was then contracted by Ajaccio, joining their youth setup in 2015.

=== Ajaccio ===
On 31 January 2020, Cimignani signed his first professional contract with Ajaccio. Cimignani made his professional debut with Ajaccio in a 1-0 loss to Châteauroux on 22 August 2020.

=== Lugano ===
On 14 June 2023, Cimignani signed for Swiss Super League club Lugano on a four-year contract.

=== National team ===
In March 2022 Yanis Cimignani received his first call-up to the France U20 national team. He made his debut on 29 March 2022, in a match against Portugal.

== Personal life ==
Cimignani was born in France to a French-Corsican father and Burkinabè Mossi mother.
