= Cédric Avinel =

Footballer (born 1986)

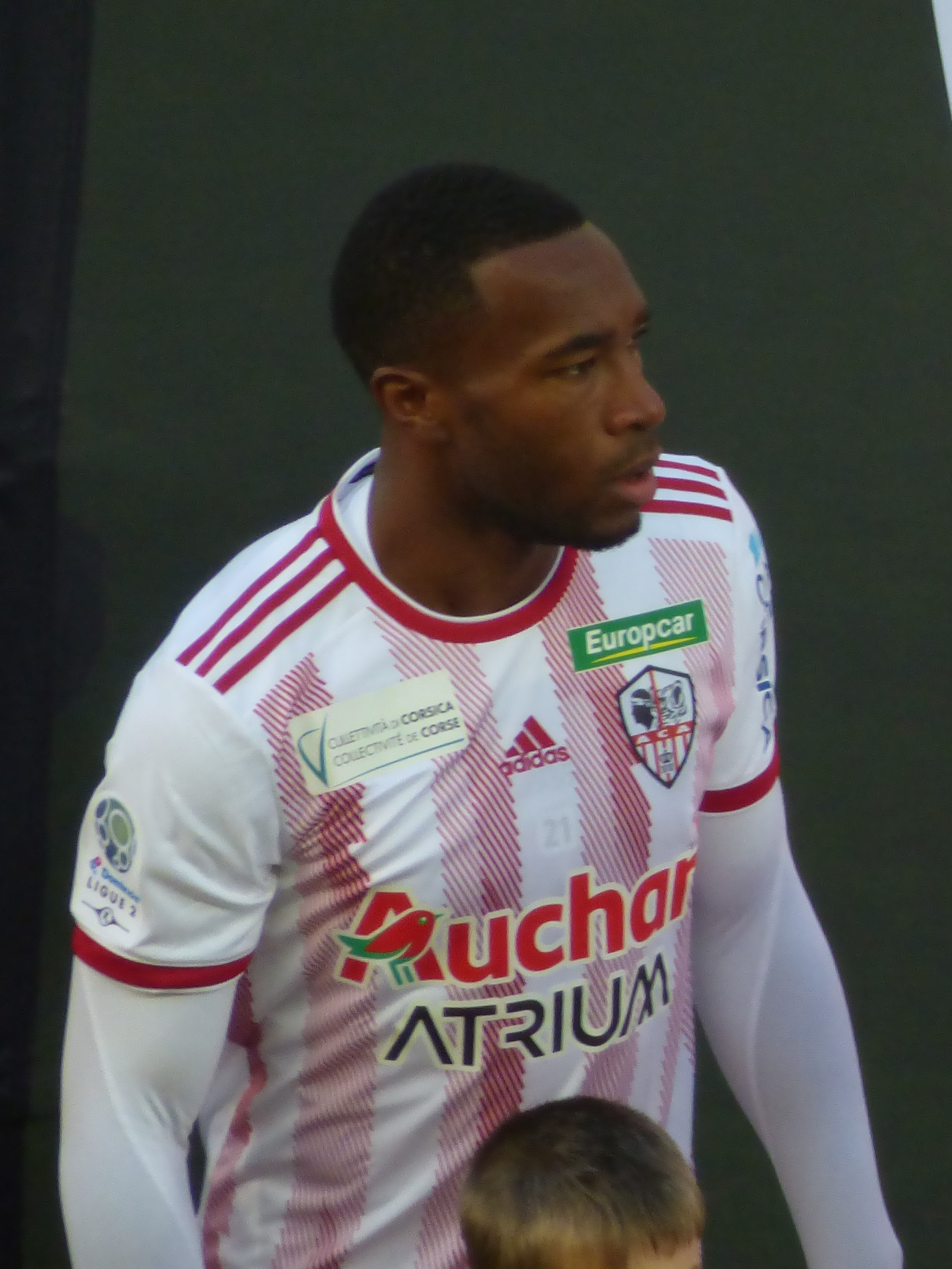
- Avinel with Ajaccio in 2018

Personal information
- Full name: Cédric Mickaël Avinel
- Date of birth: 11 September 1986 (age 40)
- Place of birth: Paris, France
- Height: 1.87 m (6 ft 2 in)
- Position: Centre-back

Team information
- Current team: Ajaccio
- Number: 21

Senior career*
Years	Team	Apps	(Gls)
2006–2007	Créteil	1	(0)
2007–2009	Watford	1	(0)
2007	→ Stafford Rangers (loan)	8	(0)
2009–2010	Gueugnon	40	(1)
2010–2011	Cannes	24	(0)
2011–2017	Clermont	182	(7)
2016	Clermont B	1	(0)
2017–2024	Ajaccio	211	(6)
2025–	Ajaccio		

International career
2008–2024	Guadeloupe	26	(0)
Medal record
Men's football
Representing Guadeloupe
Caribbean Cup
Third place	2008 Jamaica
- * Club domestic league appearances and goals as of 15 June 2024

Cédric Mickaël Avinel (born 11 September 1986) is a footballer who plays as a centre-back for Régional 1 club Ajaccio. Born in metropolitan France, he played for the Guadeloupe national team.

== Early life ==
Cédric Mickaël Avinel was born on 11 September 1986 in Paris.

== Club career ==
=== Créteil and Watford ===
Born in Paris, Avinel began his career at Créteil. He joined Watford in January 2007, signing an eighteen-month contract. He made his debut on 5 May 2007 against Reading at the Madejski Stadium. He was replaced at half-time by Adrian Mariappa. He went on to make two League Cup appearances for Watford in the 2007–08 season.

==== Loan to Stafford Rangers ====
On 14 September 2007, Avinel joined Stafford Rangers on a month-long loan, making eight appearances.

=== Gueugnon, Cannes, and Clermont ===
Avinel signed with Gueugnon in January 2009. He played 40 league matches and scored one goal for the club before leaving in the summer of 2010.

On 18 May 2010, Avinel joined Championnat National side Cannes. He made his debut for the club in the 3–0 win over Bayonne on 7 August 2010. On 26 May 2011, Avinel signed a three-year contract with Ligue 2 side Clermont.

== International career ==
Avinel made his debut for Guadeloupe on 4 December 2008, in a 2–1 loss to Cuba in the Caribbean Championship preliminary round.

== Honors ==
Ajaccio

- Régional 2 Corsica: 2025–26

Guadeloupe

- Caribbean Cup : third-place, 2008
