= Riad Nouri =

French footballer (born 1985)

Personal information
- Date of birth: 7 June 1985 (age 41)
- Place of birth: Marseille, France
- Height: 1.78 m (5 ft 10 in)
- Position: Midfielder

Team information
- Current team: Ajaccio

Senior career*
Years	Team	Apps	(Gls)
2006–2008	Marignane		
2008–2009	Cassis Carnoux	30	(2)
2009–2012	Istres	94	(15)
2012	Le Havre B	1	(1)
2012–2013	Le Havre	16	(1)
2013	→ Nîmes (loan)	18	(5)
2013	→ Nîmes B (loan)	1	(2)
2013–2015	Nîmes	63	(13)
2014	Nîmes B	1	(0)
2015–2019	Ajaccio	132	(36)
2019–2020	Ümraniyespor	25	(3)
2020–2024	Ajaccio	125	(16)
2023–2024	Ajaccio B	2	(1)
2025–	Ajaccio		
- * Club domestic league appearances and goals

Riad Nouri, also known as Ryad Nouri, (born 7 June 1985) is a French professional footballer who plays as a right midfielder for Régional 1 club Ajaccio.

== Career ==
On 27 June 2015, Ajaccio announced the signing of Nouri. On 14 August 2015, he scored his first goal for the club in a 1–1 draw against Evian.

On 7 September 2020, Nouri returned to Ajaccio.

== Personal life ==
Born in France, Nouri holds French and Algerian nationalities and is therefore eligible for both national teams.

== Honours ==
Ajaccio

- Régional 2 Corsica: 2025–26
