= Ismaël Diallo =

Ivorian footballer

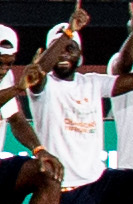
- Diallo in 2024

Personal information
- Full name: Ismaël Jean Chester Diallo
- Date of birth: 29 January 1997 (age 29)
- Place of birth: Séguéla, Ivory Coast
- Height: 1.78 m (5 ft 10 in)
- Position: Left-back

Team information
- Current team: Vizela
- Number: 39

Senior career*
Years	Team	Apps	(Gls)
2015–2018	Bastia B	24	(2)
2015–2018	Bastia	11	(0)
2018–2019	Ajaccio B	12	(0)
2018–2023	Ajaccio	76	(1)
2023–2026	Hajduk Split	50	(1)
2026–	Vizela	0	(0)

International career^{‡}
2013	Ivory Coast U17	5	(0)
2019–2021	Ivory Coast U23	9	(0)
2014–	Ivory Coast	3	(0)
Medal record
Representing Ivory Coast
Men's football
Africa Cup of Nations
Winner	2023 Ivory Coast
- * Club domestic league appearances and goals as of 14 September 2026 ‡ National team caps and goals as of 21:32, 9 April 2024 (CET)

Ismaël Jean Chester Diallo (born 29 January 1997) is an Ivorian professional footballer who plays as a left-back for Liga Portugal 2 club Vizela and the Ivory Coast national team.

== Club career ==
Diallo played his first match in Ligue 2 on April 26, 2019, in an away game at Nancy, which ended in a 1–0 victory.

At the end of the 2018–2019 season, he extended his contract with AC Ajaccio until 2023.

In July 2023, he joined Hajduk Split.

== International career ==
On 17 March 2022, he was called up to the senior national team, the Elephants, for the first time.

On 28 December 2023, he was included in the list of 27 Ivorian players selected by Jean-Louis Gasset to compete in the 2023 Africa Cup of Nations.

== Honours ==
Ivory Coast U23

- Africa U-23 Cup of Nations: runner-up 2019

Ivory Coast

- Africa Cup of Nations: 2023
