= Stade Michel Moretti =

Football stadium in France

Stade Michel-Moretti
- Timizzolu
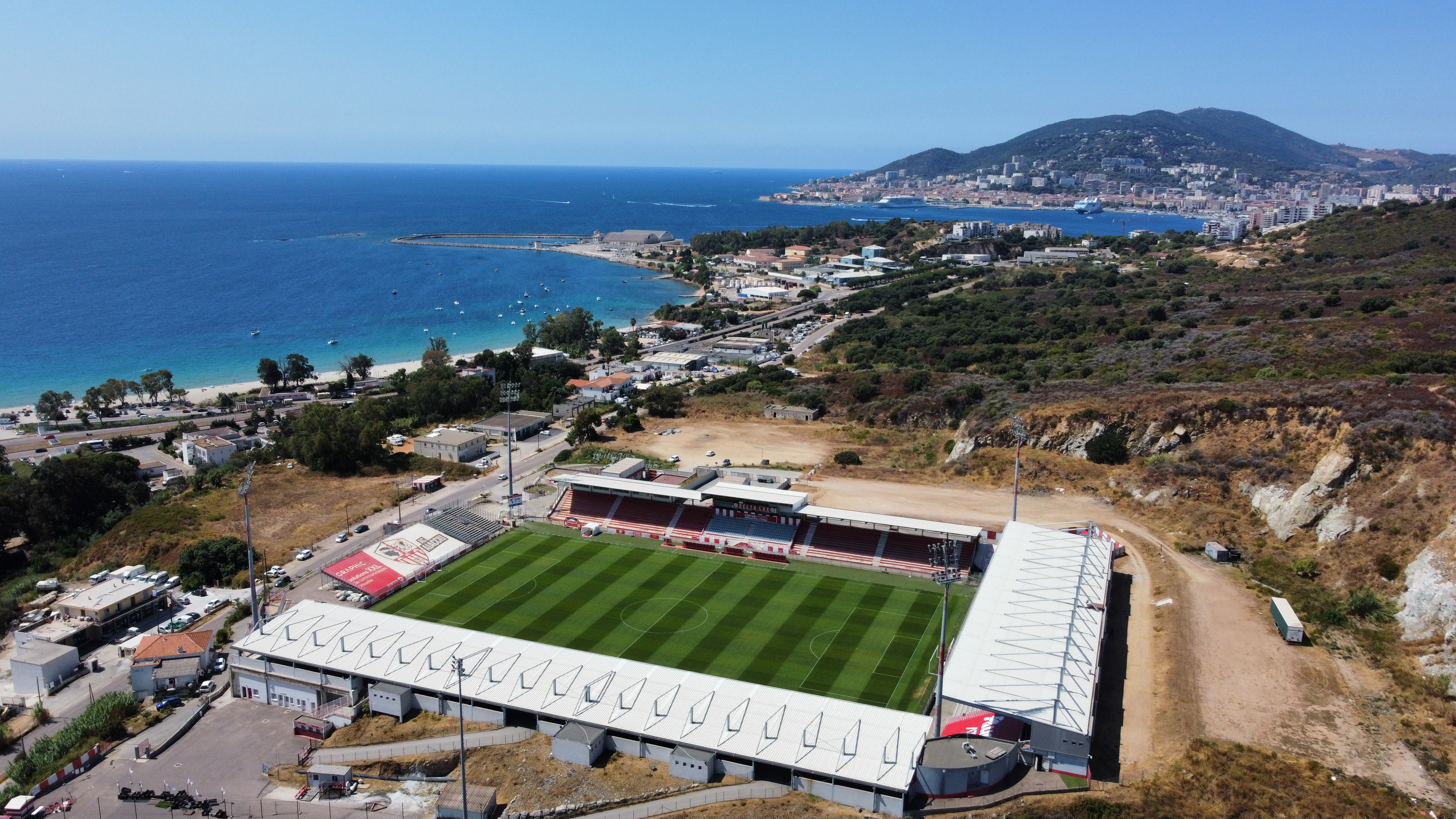
- Interactive map of Stade Michel-Moretti
- Location: Ancienne route de Sartène; Ajaccio, Corsica, France
- Coordinates: 41°55′51.89″N 8°46′36.21″E
- Owner: AC Ajaccio
- Operator: AC Ajaccio
- Capacity: 10,446
- Surface: Grass

Construction
- Opened: 1 December 1968

Tenants
- AC Ajaccio (1969–present)); Gazélec Ajaccio (some cup matches)

The Stade Michel-Moretti (pronounced [stad miʃɛl mɔʁeti]), until 2024 Stade François Coty (Corsican: Stadiu François Coty) is a football stadium in the Corsican city of Ajaccio, France, and the home of AC Ajaccio. Its capacity is 10,660.

The stadium was inaugurated on 1 December 1969 under the name Parc des Sports de l'ACA. A crowd of 14,421 was in attendance to see AC Ajaccio defeat SC Bastia in the Corsican derby. Known informally as Timizzolu, the stadium was renovated in 2002 and renamed after François Coty (1874–1934), a businessman and far-right politician from Ajaccio. Since 2007, the stadium has undergone substantial improvements to enable it to host Ligue 1 matches.
