= 2020–21 AC Ajaccio season =

AC Ajaccio
2020–21 season
- Chairman: Christian Leca
- Manager: Olivier Pantaloni
- Stadium: Stade François Coty
- Ligue 2: 13th
- Coupe de France: Round of 64
- Top goalscorer: League: Gaëtan Courtet; Bevic Moussiti-Oko (8 each); All: Gaëtan Courtet (9 goals)
Home colours	Away colours

The 2020–21 AC Ajaccio season was the club's 111th season in existence and the eighth consecutive season in the second division of French football. In addition to the domestic league, Ajaccio participated in this season's edition of the Coupe de France. The season covered the period from 1 July 2020 to 30 June 2021.

== Players ==
=== First-team squad ===
As of 15 January 2021.

Note: Flags indicate national team as defined under FIFA eligibility rules; some limited exceptions apply. Players may hold more than one non-FIFA nationality.

No.	Pos.	Nation	Player
1	GK	FRA	Benjamin Leroy
2	DF	COD	Gédéon Kalulu
3	DF	CIV	Ismaël Diallo
4	MF	FRA	Mickaël Barreto
5	MF	FRA	Riad Nouri
6	MF	FRA	Mathieu Coutadeur (captain)
7	FW	FRA	Mounaïm El Idrissy
8	DF	FRA	Jérémy Corinus
9	FW	FRA	Gaëtan Courtet
10	MF	ALB	Qazim Laçi
11	DF	FRA	Quentin Lecoeuche (on loan from Lorient)
12	MF	MLI	Abdoulaye Keita (on loan from Olympiacos)
16	GK	FRA	François-Joseph Sollacaro
17	MF	FRA	Tony Njiké
18	FW	COM	Faiz Mattoir
19	FW	FRA	Alassane N'Diaye

No.	Pos.	Nation	Player
20	MF	COM	Mohamed Youssouf
21	DF	GLP	Cédric Avinel
22	MF	FRA	Yanis Cimignani
23	DF	FRA	Matthieu Huard
24	DF	GAB	Sidney Obissa
25	FW	CGO	Bevic Moussiti-Oko
27	MF	FRA	Vincent Marchetti
28	DF	FRA	Joris Sainati
33	FW	FRA	Simon Elisor
34	DF	FRA	Baptiste Dedola
35	FW	TUN	Anis Ajroud
40	GK	FRA	Lucas Marsella
—	FW	JPN	Ryotaro Ishiyama (on loan from Tokyo Verdy)
—	FW	FRA	Florian Chabrolle
—	FW	BFA	Cyrille Bayala

== Pre-season and friendlies ==
Win Draw Loss

10 July 2020 Friendly	Ajaccio	1–0	Bastia	Ajaccio, France
16:00 CEST (UTC+2)				Stadium: Stade François Coty

22 July 2020 Friendly	Béziers	1–3	Ajaccio	Saint-Gaudens, France
16:00 CEST (UTC+2)				Stadium: Stade Jules Ribet

24 July 2020 Friendly	Bayonne	1–2	Ajaccio	Bayonne, France
19:00 CEST (UTC+2)				Stadium: Stade Didier Deschamps

1 August 2020 Friendly	Charleroi	2–2	Ajaccio	Charleroi, Belgium
19:00 CEST (UTC+2)				Stadium: Stade du Pays de Charleroi

== Competitions ==
=== Overview ===
Competition	First match	Last match	Starting round	Final position	Record							
Competition	First match	Last match	Starting round	Final position	Pld	W	D	L	GF	GA	GD	Win %
Ligue 2	22 August 2020	15 May 2021	Matchday 1	13th	38	11	13	14	34	43	−9	28.95
Coupe de France	20 January 2021	9 February 2021	Eighth round	Round of 64	2	1	0	1	3	5	−2	50.00
Total					40	12	13	15	37	48	−11	30.00

Source: Soccerway

=== Ligue 2 ===
==== League table ====
Pos	Team	Pld	W	D	L	GF	GA	GD	Pts
11	Valenciennes	38	12	11	15	50	59	−9	47
12	Le Havre	38	11	14	13	38	48	−10	47
13	Ajaccio	38	11	13	14	34	43	−9	46
14	Pau	38	11	11	16	42	49	−7	44
15	Rodez	38	8	19	11	38	44	−6	43

Source: Ligue 2
Rules for classification: 1) Points; 2) Goal difference; 3) Number of goals scored; 4) Head-to-head goal difference; 5) Fair play points

==== Results summary ====
Overall								Home						Away					
Pld	W	D	L	GF	GA	GD	Pts	W	D	L	GF	GA	GD	W	D	L	GF	GA	GD
38	11	13	14	34	43	−9	46	8	6	5	21	17	+4	3	7	9	13	26	−13

Source: Ligue 2

==== Results by round ====
Round	1	2	3	4	5	6	7	8	9	10	11	12	13	14	15	16	17	18	19	20	21	22	23	24	25	26	27	28	29	30	31	32	33	34	35	36	37	38
Ground	H	A	H	A	H	A	H	A	H	A	A	H	A	H	A	H	A	H	A	H	A	H	A	H	A	H	A	H	H	A	H	A	H	A	H	A	H	A
Result	L	L	W	L	D	L	L	W	L	W	D	D	D	D	L	W	D	W	D	W	L	W	W	D	L	L	L	W	L	L	W	D	W	L	D	D	D	D
Position	12	19	20	20	19	19	19	18	18	16	17	16	16	15	16	14	14	13	13	11	12	12	9	10	12	13	14	9	12	15	11	11	9	11	11	11	11	13

Source: Ligue 2
A = Away; H = Home; W = Win; D = Draw; L = Loss

==== Matches ====
The league fixtures were announced on 9 July 2020.

22 August 2020 1	Ajaccio	0–1	Châteauroux	Ajaccio
19:00 CEST (UTC+2)		Report	Nouri 78'	Stadium: Stade François Coty; Referee: Benjamin Lepaysant

29 August 2020 2	Caen	1–0	Ajaccio	Caen
15:00 CEST (UTC+2)	Bammou 18' (pen.)	Report		Stadium: Stade Michel d'Ornano; Referee: Remi Landry

19 September 2020 4	Grenoble	2–0	Ajaccio	Grenoble
19:00 CEST (UTC+2)	Bénet 18'; Djitté 79'	Report		Stadium: Stade des Alpes; Attendance: 3,892; Referee: Guillaume Paradis

26 September 2020 5	Ajaccio	1–1	Sochaux	Ajaccio
19:00 CEST (UTC+2)	Barreto 11'	Report	Ambri 48'	Stadium: Stade François Coty; Attendance: 2,279; Referee: Benoît Millot

30 September 2020 3	Ajaccio	1–0	Dunkerque	Ajaccio
19:00 CEST (UTC+2)	Barreto 73' (pen.)	Report		Stadium: Stade François Coty; Referee: Benjamin Lepaysant
Note: Match originally scheduled for 12 September, but postponed due to detection of a COVID-19 case.

3 October 2020 6	Auxerre	5–1	Ajaccio	Auxerre
19:00 CEST (UTC+2)	Le Bihan 7', 37'; Dugimont 23' (pen.), 41'; Fortuné 84' (pen.)	Report	Elisor 30'	Stadium: Stade de l'Abbé-Deschamps; Attendance: 0 Referee: Bartolomeu Varela

17 October 2020 7	Ajaccio	0–1	Toulouse	Ajaccio
19:00 CEST (UTC+2)		Report	Spierings 87' (pen.)	Stadium: Stade François Coty; Attendance: 0 Referee: Mehdi Mokhtari

24 October 2020 8	Clermont	0–2	Ajaccio	Clermont-Ferrand
19:00 CET (UTC+1)		Report	Courtet 54' (pen.); Nouri 90' (pen.)	Stadium: Stade Gabriel Montpied; Attendance: 0 Referee: Olivier Thual

31 October 2020 9	Ajaccio	0–4	Troyes	Ajaccio
19:00 CET (UTC+1)		Report	Saint-Louis 22'; Touzghar 49'; Baya 63'; Domingues 83'	Stadium: Stade François Coty; Attendance: 0 Referee: Thomas Léonard

7 November 2020 10	Rodez	0–1	Ajaccio	Rodez
19:00 CET (UTC+1)		Report	Nouri 82'	Stadium: Stade Paul-Lignon; Attendance: 0 Referee: Nicolas Rainville

23 November 2020 11	Guingamp	2–2	Ajaccio	Guingamp
20:45 CET (UTC+1)	Gomis 49'; Palun 90'	Report	Nouri 22'; Moussiti-Oko 54'	Stadium: Stade du Roudourou; Attendance: 0 Referee: Romain Delpech

28 November 2020 12	Ajaccio	0–0	Chambly	Ajaccio
19:00 CET (UTC+1)		Report	Gonzalez (red card) 63'	Stadium: Stade François Coty; Attendance: 0 Referee: Abdelatif Kherradji

1 December 2020 13	Valenciennes	1–1	Ajaccio	Valenciennes
19:00 CET (UTC+1)	Guillaume 58'	Report	Masson 24' (o.g.)	Stadium: Stade du Hainaut; Attendance: 0 Referee: Mathieu Vernice

7 December 2020 14	Ajaccio	1–1	Le Havre	Ajaccio
20:45 CET (UTC+1)	Courtet 65' (pen.)	Report	Gibaud 40'	Stadium: Stade François Coty; Attendance: 0 Referee: Jérémie Pignard

12 December 2020 15	Niort	2–0	Ajaccio	Niort
19:00 CET (UTC+1)	Bâ 50'; Sainati 77' (o.g.)	Report		Stadium: Stade René Gaillard; Attendance: 0 Referee: Pierre Gaillouste

18 December 2020 16	Ajaccio	1–0	Nancy	Ajaccio
20:00 CET (UTC+1)	Moussiti-Oko 45+3'	Report		Stadium: Stade François Coty; Attendance: 0 Referee: Olivier Thual

22 December 2020 17	Amiens	0–0	Ajaccio	Amiens
20:00 CET (UTC+1)		Report		Stadium: Stade de la Licorne; Attendance: 0 Referee: Nicolas Rainville

5 January 2021 18	Ajaccio	4–1	Pau	Ajaccio
20:00 CET (UTC+1)	Moussiti-Oko 12'; Nouri 30' (pen.); El Idrissy 50'; Diallo 61'	Report	Sabaly 32'	Stadium: Stade François Coty; Attendance: 0 Referee: Florent Batta

8 January 2021 19	Paris FC	1–1	Ajaccio	Paris
20:00 CET (UTC+1)	Arab 90'	Report	Moussiti-Oko 31'	Stadium: Stade Sébastien Charléty; Attendance: 0 Referee: Mehdi Mokhtari

16 January 2021 20	Ajaccio	1–0	Caen	Ajaccio
19:00 CET (UTC+1)	Moussiti-Oko 6'	Report		Stadium: Stade François Coty; Attendance: 0 Referee: Romain Delpech

23 January 2021 21	Dunkerque	3–1	Ajaccio	Dunkirk
19:00 CET (UTC+1)	Tchokounté 26', 87'; Romil 35'	Report	Bayala 46'	Stadium: Stade Marcel-Tribut; Attendance: 0 Referee: Guillaume Paradis

30 January 2021 22	Ajaccio	2–1	Grenoble	Ajaccio
19:00 CET (UTC+1)	Bayala 59' (pen.); Barreto 67'	Report	Djitté 62'	Stadium: Stade François Coty; Attendance: 0 Referee: Alexandre Perreau Niel

2 February 2021 23	Sochaux	0–2	Ajaccio	Montbéliard
20:00 CET (UTC+1)	Diedhiou (red card) 44'	Report	Courtet 45+1' (pen.); Barreto 46'	Stadium: Stade Auguste Bonal; Attendance: 0 Referee: Jérôme Miguelgorry

5 February 2021 24	Ajaccio	0–0	Auxerre	Ajaccio
20:00 CET (UTC+1)		Report		Stadium: Stade François Coty; Attendance: 0 Referee: Gaël Angoula

15 February 2021 25	Toulouse	3–0	Ajaccio	Toulouse
20:45 CET (UTC+1)	Machado 27'; Adli 86'; Bayo 90+1'	Report		Stadium: Stadium de Toulouse; Attendance: 0 Referee: Jérémy Stinat

20 February 2021 26	Ajaccio	0–2	Clermont	Ajaccio
19:00 CET (UTC+1)		Report	Allevinah 54'; Bayo 58'	Stadium: Stade François Coty; Attendance: 0 Referee: Sylvain Palhies

27 February 2021 27	Troyes	1–0	Ajaccio	Troyes
15:00 CET (UTC+1)	Touzghar 90+3'			Stadium: Stade de l'Aube; Attendance: 0 Referee: Guillaume Paradis

2 March 2021 28	Ajaccio	1–0	Rodez	Ajaccio
20:00 CET (UTC+1)	Njiké 90'	Report		Stadium: Stade François Coty; Attendance: 0 Referee: Rémi Landry

13 March 2021 29	Ajaccio	0–2	Guingamp	Ajaccio
20:00 CET (UTC+1)	Diallo (yellow card) 61'; Bayala (yellow card) 73'; Nouri (yellow card) 87'	Report	Fofana 22'; M'Changama (yellow card) 51'; Sampaio (yellow card) 53'; Ba (yellow card) 58'; Pierrot 78'	Stadium: Stade François Coty; Referee: Benjamin Lepaysant

19 March 2021 30	Chambly	2–1	Ajaccio	Chambly
19:00 CET (UTC+1)	Badu 52'; Danger 57'	Report	Laçi (yellow card) 44'; Courtet 64'	Stadium: Stade des Marais; Referee: Johan Hamel

3 April 2021 31	Ajaccio	3–0	Valenciennes	Ajaccio
20:00 CEST (UTC+2)	Courtet 40'; Barreto 47'; Moussiti-Oko (yellow card) 53', (goal) 63'; Huard (yellow card) 82'	Report	Abeid (yellow card) 17' (yellow-red card) 85'; D'Almeida (yellow card) 68' (yellow-red card) 73'; Dabo (yellow card) 73'	Stadium: Stade François Coty; Referee: Alexandre Perreau Niel

10 April 2021 32	Le Havre	1–1	Ajaccio	Le Havre
20:00 CET (UTC+1)	Bonnet 33' (pen.), (yellow card) 86'; Alioui (yellow card) 61'	Report	Kalulu (yellow card) 31'; Laçi (yellow card) 31'; Marchetti (yellow card) 54'; Arconte 74'	Stadium: Stade Océane; Referee: Guillaume Paradis

17 April 2021 33	Ajaccio	3–0	Niort	Ajaccio
20:00 CEST (UTC+2)	Courtet 22', 28'; Marchetti (yellow card) 33'; Laçi 82'	Report	Doukansy (yellow card) 9'	Stadium: Stade François Coty; Referee: Rémi Landry

20 April 2021 34	Nancy	2–0	Ajaccio	Tomblaine
20:00 CEST (UTC+2)	Ciss 63', 79'	Report		Stadium: Stade Marcel Picot; Attendance: 0 Referee: Bastien Dechepy

24 April 2021 35	Ajaccio	2–2	Amiens	Ajaccio
19:00 CEST (UTC+2)	Moussiti-Oko (yellow card) 4' (yellow-red card) 61', (goal) 48'; Courtet 39' (pen.); Coutadeur (yellow card) 85'	Report	Monzango (yellow card) 6'; Timité 25'; Diakhaby 90+3'	Stadium: Stade François Coty; Referee: Karim Abed

1 May 2021 36	Pau	0–0	Ajaccio	Pau
20:00 CEST (UTC+2)	S. Diarra (yellow card) 80'	Report	Marchetti (yellow card) 80'	Stadium: Stade du Hameau; Referee: Pierre Gaillouste

8 May 2021 37	Ajaccio	1–1	Paris FC	Ajaccio
20:00 CEST (UTC+2)	Moussiti-Oko 39'; Barreto (yellow card) 55'; Youssouf (yellow card) 57'	Report	Caddy 15'; Kanté (red card) 27'	Stadium: Stade François Coty; Referee: Gaël Angoula

15 May 2021 38	Châteauroux	0–0	Ajaccio	Châteauroux
20:00 CEST (UTC+2)	M'Boné (yellow card) 49'	Report	Courtet (penalty missed) 78', (yellow card) 86'	Stadium: Stade Gaston Petit; Referee: Arnaud Baert

=== Coupe de France ===
19 January 2021 Eighth round	Châteauroux	0–2	Ajaccio	Châteauroux
18:00 CET (UTC+1)	Doucouré (yellow card) 38'; Opa Sanganté (yellow card) 49'	Report	Barreto 18'; Sainati (yellow card) 34'; Courtet 61'	Stadium: Stade Gaston Petit; Attendance: 0 Referee: (France) Mathieu Vernice
Note: Played Behind Closed Doors

9 February 2021 Round of 64	Lyon	5–1	Ajaccio	Décines-Charpieu
21:00 CET (UTC+1)	Depay 10'; Slimani 22'; Cornet 24'; Cherki 38'; Aouar 79' (pen.)	Report	Nouri 90' (pen.)	Stadium: Parc Olympique Lyonnais; Attendance: 0 Referee: Florent Batta
