= 2020–21 Valenciennes FC season =

Valenciennes FC
2020–21 season
- Chairman: Eddy Zdziech
- Manager: Olivier Guégan
- Stadium: Stade du Hainaut
- Ligue 2: 11th
- Coupe de France: Round of 32
- Top goalscorer: League: Baptiste Guillaume (11); All: Baptiste Guillaume (14)
Home colours	Away colours	Third colours

The 2020–21 Valenciennes FC season was the club's 108th season in existence and the seventh consecutive season in the second flight of French football. In addition to the domestic league, Valenciennes participated in this season's edition of the Coupe de France. The season covered the period from 1 July 2020 to 30 June 2021.

== Players ==
=== First-team squad ===
As of 7 January 2021.

Note: Flags indicate national team as defined under FIFA eligibility rules; some limited exceptions apply. Players may hold more than one non-FIFA nationality.

No.	Pos.	Nation	Player
1	GK	FRA	Jérôme Prior
3	DF	MTN	Aly Abeid
4	MF	BEN	Sessi D'Almeida
5	DF	ALG	Maxime Spano
6	MF	FRA	Gaëtan Arib
7	FW	CIV	Moussa Guel
8	MF	SUI	Matteo Fedele
9	FW	FRA	Gaëtan Robail (on loan from Lens)
10	MF	CMR	Arsène Elogo
11	MF	ALG	Malek Chergui
13	MF	FRA	Julien Masson
14	DF	FRA	Joffrey Cuffaut
15	DF	FRA	Éric Vandenabeele
16	GK	CIV	Hillel Konaté

No.	Pos.	Nation	Player
17	MF	ALG	Aymen Boutoutaou
18	FW	BEL	Baptiste Guillaume
19	DF	SEN	Elhadj Dabo
20	DF	FRA	Ismaël Doukouré
21	MF	FRA	Noah Diliberto
22	FW	TUR	Metehan Güçlü (on loan from Rennes)
24	DF	FRA	Allan Linguet
25	DF	GHA	Emmanuel Ntim
26	FW	FRA	Kévin Cabral
27	MF	FRA	Mathis Picouleau
28	DF	FRA	Laurent Dos Santos (captain)
29	FW	CIV	Issouf Macalou
30	GK	FRA	Nicolas Kocik

=== Out on loan ===
Note: Flags indicate national team as defined under FIFA eligibility rules; some limited exceptions apply. Players may hold more than one non-FIFA nationality.

No.	Pos.	Nation	Player
—	DF	CMR	Frédéric Bong (on loan at SC Lyon)

== Pre-season and friendlies ==
Win Draw Loss

24 July 2020 Friendly	Valenciennes (France)	0–1	(Belgium) Excel Mouscron	Famars, France
16:00 CEST (UTC+2)		Report		Stadium: Stade Centre Formation VAFC N° 2 Attendance: 0

29 July 2020 Friendly	Villefranche (France)	0–4	(France) Valenciennes	Villefranche-sur-Mer, France
15:00 CEST (UTC+2)		Report	Güçlü; Chevalier; Cabral; Cuffaut	Stadium: Stade Municipal; Attendance: 0

1 August 2020 Friendly	Sporting Club Lyon (France)	3–4	(France) Valenciennes	Chasse-sur-Rhône, France
11:00 CEST (UTC+2)				Stadium: Complexe Sportif de Moleyre

5 August 2020 Friendly	Amiens (France)	1–2	(France) Valenciennes	Amiens, France
18:00 CEST (UTC+2)	Papeau 14'	Report	Gendrey 17' (o.g.); Chevalier 19'	Stadium: Stade de la Licorne

== Competitions ==
=== Overview ===
Competition	First match	Last match	Starting round	Final position	Record							
Competition	First match	Last match	Starting round	Final position	Pld	W	D	L	GF	GA	GD	Win %
Ligue 2	22 August 2020	15 May 2021	Matchday 1	11th	38	12	11	15	50	59	−9	31.58
Coupe de France	19 January 2021	6 March 2021	Eighth round	Round of 32	3	2	0	1	6	7	−1	66.67
Total					41	14	11	16	56	66	−10	34.15

Source: Soccerway

=== Ligue 2 ===
==== League table ====
Pos	Team	Pld	W	D	L	GF	GA	GD	Pts
9	Guingamp	38	10	17	11	41	43	−2	47
10	Amiens	38	11	14	13	34	40	−6	47
11	Valenciennes	38	12	11	15	50	59	−9	47
12	Le Havre	38	11	14	13	38	48	−10	47
13	Ajaccio	38	11	13	14	34	43	−9	46

Source: Ligue 2
Rules for classification: 1) Points; 2) Goal difference; 3) Number of goals scored; 4) Head-to-head goal difference; 5) Fair play points

==== Results summary ====
Overall								Home						Away					
Pld	W	D	L	GF	GA	GD	Pts	W	D	L	GF	GA	GD	W	D	L	GF	GA	GD
38	12	11	15	50	59	−9	47	7	6	6	24	23	+1	5	5	9	26	36	−10

Source: Ligue 2

==== Results by round ====
Round	1	2	3	4	5	6	7	8	9	10	11	12	13	14	15	16	17	18	19	20	21	22	23	24	25	26	27	28	29	30	31	32	33	34	35	36	37	38
Ground	H	A	H	A	H	A	H	A	H	A	H	A	H	A	A	H	A	H	A	H	A	H	A	H	A	H	A	H	A	H	A	H	H	A	H	A	H	A
Result	W	L	W	L	W	L	D	D	L	W	D	D	D	W	D	L	W	L	W	W	D	W	D	L	L	D	L	W	L	D	L	W	L	L	D	W	L	L
Position	2	7	6	8	6	9	8	11	15	11	11	11	10	10	9	11	11	11	10	10	7	7	7	8	11	10	12	11	11	11	9	8	8	10	10	8	8	11

Source: Ligue 2
A = Away; H = Home; W = Win; D = Draw; L = Loss

==== Matches ====
The league fixtures were announced on 9 July 2020.

22 August 2020 1	Valenciennes	3–0	Pau	Valenciennes
19:00 CEST (UTC+2)	Guillaume 4'; Chevalier 13' (pen.); Cabral 57'	Report		Stadium: Stade du Hainaut; Referee: Alexandre Perreau Niel

29 August 2020 2	Paris FC	1–0	Valenciennes	Paris
19:00 CEST (UTC+2)	Laura 47'	Report		Stadium: Stade Sébastien Charléty; Referee: Guillaume Paradis

12 September 2020 3	Valenciennes	1–0	Châteauroux	Valenciennes
19:00 CEST (UTC+2)	Chevalier 67'	Report		Stadium: Stade du Hainaut; Referee: Sylvain Palhies

19 September 2020 4	Dunkerque	1–0	Valenciennes	Dunkirk
19:00 CEST (UTC+2)	Gomis 75'	Report		Stadium: Stade Marcel-Tribut; Attendance: 1,394; Referee: Bartolomeu Varela

26 September 2020 5	Valenciennes	1–0	Caen	Valenciennes
19:00 CEST (UTC+2)	Ntim 10'	Report		Stadium: Stade du Hainaut; Attendance: 4,180; Referee: Florent Batta

3 October 2020 6	Grenoble	2–0	Valenciennes	Grenoble
19:00 CEST (UTC+2)	Diallo 30'; Ravet 58' (pen.)	Report		Stadium: Stade des Alpes; Attendance: 0 Referee: Romain Lissorgue

17 October 2020 7	Valenciennes	0–0	Sochaux	Valenciennes
15:00 CEST (UTC+2)		Report		Stadium: Stade du Hainaut; Attendance: 0 Referee: Pierre Gaillouste

24 October 2020 8	Troyes	1–1	Valenciennes	Troyes
17:00 CEST (UTC+2)	Salmier (red card) 3'; Touzghar 16'	Report	Chevalier 8' (pen.)	Stadium: Stade de l'Aube; Attendance: 0 Referee: Abdelatif Kherradji

31 October 2020 9	Valenciennes	1–3	Clermont	Valenciennes
19:00 CET (UTC+1)	Cabral 37'	Report	Bayo 20' (pen.), 67', 86'	Stadium: Stade du Hainaut; Attendance: 0 Referee: Benjamin Lepaysant

7 November 2020 10	Toulouse	4–5	Valenciennes	Toulouse
19:00 CET (UTC+1)	Adli 14', 23'; Dejaegere 58'; Antiste 83'	Report	Cabral 26'; Cuffaut 33', 63', 77', 86'	Stadium: Stadium de Toulouse; Attendance: 0 Referee: Sylvain Palhies

21 November 2020 11	Valenciennes	1–1	Rodez	Valenciennes
19:00 CET (UTC+1)	Guillaume 39'	Report	Douline 71'	Stadium: Stade du Hainaut; Attendance: 0 Referee: Olivier Thual

28 November 2020 12	Auxerre	1–1	Valenciennes	Auxerre
19:00 CET (UTC+1)	Autret 45+1'	Report	Chevalier 12'	Stadium: Stade de l'Abbé-Deschamps; Attendance: 0 Referee: Rémi Landry

1 December 2020 13	Valenciennes	1–1	Ajaccio	Valenciennes
19:00 CET (UTC+1)	Guillaume 58'	Report	Masson 24' (o.g.)	Stadium: Stade du Hainaut; Attendance: 0 Referee: Mathieu Vernice

5 December 2020 14	Chambly	1–2	Valenciennes	Chambly
19:00 CET (UTC+1)	Correa 35'	Report	Guillaume 66'; Cabral 87'	Stadium: Stade Pierre Brisson; Attendance: 0 Referee: Romain Delpech

12 December 2020 15	Guingamp	1–1	Valenciennes	Guingamp
18:00 CET (UTC+1)	Ngbakoto 66'	Report	Guillaume 55'	Stadium: Stade du Roudourou; Attendance: 0 Referee: Romain Lissorgue

18 December 2020 16	Valenciennes	0–2	Amiens	Valenciennes
20:00 CET (UTC+1)		Report	Alphonse 81'; Gomis 85'	Stadium: Stade du Hainaut; Attendance: 0 Referee: Alexandre Perreau Niel

22 December 2020 17	Niort	0–3	Valenciennes	Niort
20:00 CET (UTC+1)		Report		Stadium: Stade René Gaillard; Referee: Remi Landry
Note: Match awarded as a forfeit to Valenciennes due to numerous covid positives in the Niort organization.

5 January 2021 18	Valenciennes	2–3	Nancy	Valenciennes
20:00 CET (UTC+1)	Guillaume 45'; Cabral 52'	Report	Biron 59'; Rocha Santos 77'; Cissokho 90' (pen.)	Stadium: Stade du Hainaut; Attendance: 0 Referee: Nicolas Rainville

8 January 2021 19	Le Havre	0–2	Valenciennes	Le Havre
20:00CET (UTC+1)		Report	Picouleau 63'; Guillaume 67'	Stadium: Stade Océane; Attendance: 0 Referee: Pierre Gaillouste

23 January 2021 21	Châteauroux	3–3	Valenciennes	Châteauroux
19:00 CET (UTC+1)	Ntim 9' (o.g.); Chouaref 57'; Gonçalves 90'	Report	Cuffaut 47', 73'; Ntim 83'	Stadium: Stade Gaston Petit; Attendance: 0 Referee: Rémi Landry

26 January 2021 20	Valenciennes	2–0	Paris FC	Valenciennes
19:00 CET (UTC+1)	Cuffaut 59'; Cabral 69'	Report		Stadium: Stade du Hainaut; Attendance: 0 Referee: Arnaud Baert

30 January 2021 22	Valenciennes	1–0	Dunkerque	Valenciennes
19:00 CET (UTC+1)	Cabral 28'	Report		Stadium: Stade du Hainaut; Attendance: 0 Referee: Mathieu Vernice

2 February 2021 23	Caen	1–1	Valenciennes	Caen
20:00 CET (UTC+1)	Bammou 52' (pen.)	Report	Guel 5'	Stadium: Stade Michel d'Ornano; Attendance: 0 Referee: Gaël Angoula

5 February 2021 24	Valenciennes	0–1	Grenoble	Valenciennes
20:00 CET (UTC+1)		Report	Ntim 75' (o.g.)	Stadium: Stade du Hainaut; Attendance: 0 Referee: Sylvain Palhies

15 February 2021 25	Sochaux	2–0	Valenciennes	Montbéliard
18:45 CET (UTC+1)	Weissbeck 14'; Niane 76'	Report		Stadium: Stade Auguste Bonal; Attendance: 0 Referee: Bartolomeu Varela

20 February 2021 26	Valenciennes	2–2	Troyes	Valenciennes
15:00 CET (UTC+1)	Guillaume 13'; Vandenabeele 90+1'	Report	Touzghar 64' (pen.); Gory 71'	Stadium: Stade du Hainaut; Attendance: 0 Referee: Romain Lissorgue

27 February 2021 27	Clermont	4–0	Valenciennes	Clermont-Ferrand
19:00 CET (UTC+1)	Bayo 30'; Dossou 31', 55'; Allevinah 59'	Report		Stadium: Stade Gabriel Montpied; Attendance: 0 Referee: Alexandre Perreau Niel

2 March 2021 28	Valenciennes	1–0	Toulouse	Valenciennes
20:00 CET (UTC+1)	Guillaume 19'	Report		Stadium: Stade du Hainaut; Attendance: 0 Referee: Abdelatif Kherradji

13 March 2021 29	Rodez	3–0	Valenciennes	Rodez
20:00 CET (UTC+1)	Douline (yellow card) 61'; David 66', 73' (pen.); Bonnet 69'	Report	D'Almeida (yellow card) 18'; Robail (yellow card) 46'; Pellenard (yellow card) 77'; Cuffaut (yellow card) 83'	Stadium: Stade Paul-Lignon; Referee: Mathieu Vernice

20 March 2021 30	Valenciennes	2–2	Auxerre	Valenciennes
20:00 CET (UTC+1)	Cuffaut 45+1' (pen.); Masson (yellow card) 62'; Kankava (yellow card) 83'; Guillaume 86'; Doukouré (yellow card) 90+3'	Report	Lloris 22'; Le Bihan 32'; Touré (yellow card) 81'	Stadium: Stade du Hainaut; Referee: Pierre Gaillouste

3 April 2021 31	Ajaccio	3–0	Valenciennes	Ajaccio
20:00 CEST (UTC+2)	Courtet 40'; Barreto 47'; Moussiti-Oko (yellow card) 53', (goal) 63'; Huard (yellow card) 82'	Report	Abeid (yellow card) 17' (yellow-red card) 85'; D'Almeida (yellow card) 68' (yellow-red card) 73'; Dabo (yellow card) 73'	Stadium: Stade François Coty; Referee: Alexandre Perreau Niel

10 April 2021 32	Valenciennes	2–1	Chambly	Valenciennes
20:00 CET (UTC+1)	Linguet 10'; Elogo 54'; Kankava (yellow card) 71'	Report	Delos 6'; Callegari (red card) 31'; Soubervie (yellow card) 51'; Eickmayer (yellow card) 59'; Derrien (yellow card) 61'; Guezoui (yellow card) 89' (yellow-red card) 89'	Stadium: Stade du Hainaut; Referee: Thomas Léonard

17 April 2021 33	Valenciennes	0–1	Guingamp	Valenciennes
20:00 CEST (UTC+2)	Picouleau (yellow card) 39'	Report	Phiri (yellow card) 4'; Rodelin 48'; Mellot (yellow card) 74'; Niakaté (yellow card) 80'; Pierrot (yellow card) 85'	Stadium: Stade du Hainaut; Referee: Gaël Angoula

20 April 2021 34	Amiens	3–1	Valenciennes	Amiens
20:00 CET (UTC+1)	Lusamba (yellow card) 45+1', (goal) 64' (pen.); Odey (yellow card) 80', (goal) 90+4'; Alphonse 90+2'	Report	Abeid (yellow card) 19'; Guillaume (yellow card) 62'; Doukouré (yellow card) 76'; Cuffaut 90+1' (pen.)	Stadium: Stade de la Licorne; Referee: Benjamin Lepaysant

24 April 2021 35	Valenciennes	1–1	Niort	Valenciennes
20:00 CEST (UTC+2)	Vandenabeele (red card) 40'; Ntim 64'; Guillaume (yellow card) 79'; Kankava (yellow card) 90'	Report	Ba (penalty missed) 42'; Matufueni (yellow card) 68'; Jacob 71'	Stadium: Stade du Hainaut; Referee: Abdelatif Kherradji

1 May 2021 36	Nancy	1–3	Valenciennes	Tomblaine
20:00 CEST (UTC+2)	Bassi 31'	Report	Boutoutaou 1', 60'; Ntim (yellow card) 29'; Kankava (yellow card) 70'; Chergui 79'	Stadium: Stade Marcel Picot; Referee: Romain Delpech

8 May 2021 37	Valenciennes	3–5	Le Havre	Valenciennes
20:00 CEST (UTC+2)	Vandenabeele (yellow card) 5'; Boutoutaou 31'; Doukouré (yellow card) 44'; Cuffaut 53' (pen.); Ntim (yellow card) 66'; Macalou 89'	Report	Basque 6', 65'; Thiaré 10'; Boutaïb 42'; M. Fofana 73'	Stadium: Stade du Hainaut; Referee: Mathieu Vernice

15 May 2021 38	Pau	4–3	Valenciennes	Pau
20:00 CEST (UTC+2)	Itaitinga 3'; Lobry 12'; George 16', (yellow card) 72'; Assifuah 50'; Armand (yellow card) 59'; Kouassi (yellow card) 71'	Report	Pellenard (yellow card) 30'; Vandenabeele 56', (yellow card) 63'; Dos Santos 62'; Chergui (yellow card) 72'; Haouari 84'	Stadium: Stade du Hameau; Referee: Remi Landry

=== Coupe de France ===
19 January 2021 Eighth round	Valenciennes	2–0	Chambly	Valenciennes
18:00 CET (UTC+1)	Cabral 8'; Guillaume 17' (pen.); Konaté (yellow card) 63'; Linguet (yellow card) 67'	Report	Camelo (yellow card) 15'; Beaulieu (yellow card) 70'	Stadium: Stade du Hainaut; Attendance: 0 Referee: Mehdi Mokhtari

9 February 2021 Round of 64	Reims	3–4	Valenciennes	Reims
18:30 CET (UTC+1)	Sierhuis 30'; Maresic (yellow card) 39'; Dia 84', 90'	Report	Guillaume 22', 56'; Cabral 63', 81'; D'Almeida (yellow card) 73'	Stadium: Stade Auguste Delaune; Attendance: 0 Referee: Jérémie Pignard

6 March 2021 Round of 32	Valenciennes	0–4	Metz	Valenciennes
16:30 CET (UTC+1)	Guillaume (penalty missed) 5'; Cuffaut (yellow card) 55'	Report	Centonze 7' (pen.); Ambrose 34' (pen.); Maziz (yellow card) 50'; Vagner 61'; Sarr 89'	Stadium: Stade du Hainaut; Attendance: 0 Referee: Stéphanie Frappart

== Statistics ==
=== Goalscorers ===
As of 22 August 2020

Rank	No.	Pos	Nat	Name	Ligue 2	Coupe de France	Total
1	9	FW	(France)	Teddy Chevalier	1	0	1
1	18	FW	(Belgium)	Baptiste Guillaume	1	0	1
1	26	FW	(France)	Kévin Cabral	1	0	1
Totals					3	0	3
