= 2020–21 Grenoble Foot 38 season =

Grenoble Foot 38
2020–21 season
- Chairman: Stéphane Rosnoblet
- Manager: Philippe Hinschberger
- Stadium: Stade des Alpes
- Ligue 2: 4th
- Coupe de France: Round of 64
- Top goalscorer: League: Achille Anani; Moussa Djitté (8 each); All: Achille Anani; Moussa Djitté (8 each)
Home colours	Away colours

The 2020–21 Grenoble Foot 38 season was the club's 129th season in existence and its third consecutive season in the second flight of French football. In addition to the domestic league, Grenoble participated in this season's edition of the Coupe de France. The season covered the period from 1 July 2020 to 30 June 2021.

== Players ==
=== First-team squad ===
As of 24 November 2020.

Note: Flags indicate national team as defined under FIFA eligibility rules; some limited exceptions apply. Players may hold more than one non-FIFA nationality.

No.	Pos.	Nation	Player
1	GK	FRA	Brice Maubleu (captain)
2	FW	SEN	Moussa Djitté
3	DF	NED	Bart Straalman
4	MF	FRA	Manuel Perez
5	DF	FRA	Adrien Monfray
6	MF	SUI	Charles Pickel
7	FW	CPV	Willy Semedo
8	MF	FRA	Anthony Belmonte
9	FW	TOG	David Henen
10	MF	FRA	Florian Michel
11	FW	CIV	Achille Anani
12	DF	FRA	Jordy Gaspar
13	DF	MTN	Harouna Abou Demba
14	DF	GLP	Loïc Nestor

No.	Pos.	Nation	Player
16	GK	FRA	Paul Bourdelle
17	DF	FRA	Loris Néry
19	FW	SEN	Mamadou Diallo
21	MF	FRA	Jessy Bénet
22	MF	FRA	Yoric Ravet
23	DF	MAD	Jérôme Mombris
26	MF	FRA	Kevin Tapoko (on loan from Hapoel Be'er Sheva)
27	DF	FRA	Chris Goteni
28	DF	FRA	Jules Sylvestre-Brac
29	DF	COM	Akim Abdallah
30	GK	FRA	Esteban Salles
—	FW	GAB	Orphé Mbina
—	FW	FRA	Maxence Renoud

=== Out on loan ===
Note: Flags indicate national team as defined under FIFA eligibility rules; some limited exceptions apply. Players may hold more than one non-FIFA nationality.

No.	Pos.	Nation	Player
—	MF	GUY	Terell Ondaan (on loan to N.E.C.)
—	FW	ISL	Kristófer Kristinsson (on loan to Jong PSV)

== Pre-season and friendlies ==
Win Draw Loss

17 July 2020 Friendly	Grenoble (France)	1–0	(France) Sporting Club Lyon	Grenoble, France
18:00 CEST (UTC+2)	Kristinsson 20'	Report		Stadium: Stade Paul Elkaïm

31 July 2020 Friendly	Grenoble (France)	2–0	(France) Nîmes	Saint-Marcellin, France
17:00 CEST (UTC+2)	Ondaan 65'; Diallo 90'	Report		Stadium: Stade La Saulaie

5 August 2020 Friendly	Grenoble (France)	Cancelled	(Switzerland) Stade Nyonnais	La Rochette, France
18:00 CEST (UTC+2)		Report		Stadium: Stade Municipal de La Rochette

7 August 2020 Friendly	Grenoble (France)	3–0	(France) RC Grasse	Grenoble, France
17:00 CEST (UTC+2)	Anani 3'; Diallo 68', 81'	Report		Stadium: Stade Stijovic N°1; Attendance: 0

12 August 2020 Friendly	FC Villefranche (France)	0–2	(France) Grenoble	Villefranche-sur-Saône, France
19:00 CEST (UTC+2)		Report	Anani 78'; Semedo 83'	Stadium: Stade Armand Chouffet

15 August 2020 Friendly	Grenoble (France)	4–0	(France) Clermont Foot	Grenoble, France
19:30 CEST (UTC+2)	Mombris 35'; Bénet 43' (pen.); Djitté 70', 73'	Report		Stadium: Stade des Alpes; Attendance: 941

4 September 2020 Friendly	Grenoble (France)	0–0	(France) Rodez	France
16:00 CEST (UTC+2)

13 November 2020 Friendly	Saint-Étienne (France)	3–2	(France) Grenoble	Saint-Étienne, France
15:00 CET (UTC+1)	Rivera 33'; Abi 55'; Tormin 88'	Report	Djitté 17', 43'	Stadium: Stade Geoffroy-Guichard; Attendance: 0

== Competitions ==
=== Overview ===
Competition	First match	Last match	Starting round	Final position	Record							
Competition	First match	Last match	Starting round	Final position	Pld	W	D	L	GF	GA	GD	Win %
Ligue 2	22 August 2020	15 May 2021	Matchday 1	4th	38	18	11	9	51	35	+16	47.37
Coupe de France	20 January 2021	10 February 2021	Eighth round	Round of 64	2	0	1	1	1	2	−1	0.00
Total					40	18	12	10	52	37	+15	45.00

Source: Soccerway

=== Ligue 2 ===
==== League table ====
Pos	Team	Pld	W	D	L	GF	GA	GD	Pts	Promotion or Relegation
2	Clermont (P)	38	21	9	8	61	25	+36	72	Promotion to Ligue 1
3	Toulouse	38	20	10	8	71	42	+29	70	Qualification to promotion play-offs
4	Grenoble	38	18	11	9	51	35	+16	65	Qualification to promotion play-offs
5	Paris FC	38	17	13	8	53	37	+16	64	Qualification to promotion play-offs
6	Auxerre	38	16	14	8	64	43	+21	62	

Source: Ligue 2
Rules for classification: 1) Points; 2) Goal difference; 3) Number of goals scored; 4) Head-to-head goal difference; 5) Fair play points
(P) Promoted

==== Results summary ====
Overall								Home						Away					
Pld	W	D	L	GF	GA	GD	Pts	W	D	L	GF	GA	GD	W	D	L	GF	GA	GD
38	18	11	9	51	35	+16	65	12	6	1	35	14	+21	6	5	8	16	21	−5

Source: Ligue 2

==== Results by round ====
Round	1	2	3	4	5	6	7	8	9	10	11	12	13	14	15	16	17	18	19	20	21	22	23	24	25	26	27	28	29	30	31	32	33	34	35	36	37	38
Ground	A	H	A	H	A	H	A	H	A	H	H	A	A	H	A	A	H	A	H	A	H	A	H	A	H	A	H	A	H	A	H	H	A	H	A	H	A	H
Result	L	W	W	W	L	W	L	W	W	W	D	W	D	W	D	D	W	L	D	L	W	L	W	W	D	W	D	W	D	L	D	W	D	W	L	L	D	W
Position	15	8	4	2	3	3	3	3	3	3	3	3	3	1	3	3	3	3	3	5	4	4	4	3	4	4	4	4	4	4	4	3	4	4	4	4	4	4

Source: Ligue 2
A = Away; H = Home; W = Win; D = Draw; L = Loss

==== Matches ====
The league fixtures were announced on 9 July 2020.

22 August 2020 1	Rodez	1–0	Grenoble	Rodez
19:00 CEST (UTC+2)	Ouhafsa 70'	Report		Stadium: Stade Paul-Lignon; Referee: Bartolomeu Varela

29 August 2020 2	Grenoble	5–3	Toulouse	Grenoble
19:00 CEST (UTC+2)	Nestor 12'; Anani 16'; Bénet 32'; Semedo 42'; Djitté 69'	Report	Bayo 30', 45'; Antiste 80'	Stadium: Stade des Alpes; Referee: Arnaud Baert

12 September 2020 3	Chambly	1–2	Grenoble	Beauvais
19:00 CEST (UTC+2)	Guezoui 10'	Report	Anani 73'; Ondaan 90'	Stadium: Stade Pierre Brisson; Referee: Mathieu Vernice

19 September 2020 4	Grenoble	2–0	Ajaccio	Grenoble
19:00 CEST (UTC+2)	Bénet 18'; Djitté 79'	Report		Stadium: Stade des Alpes; Attendance: 3,892; Referee: Guillaume Paradis

26 September 2020 5	Guingamp	1–0	Grenoble	Guingamp
19:00 CEST (UTC+2)	Ngbakoto 23'	Report		Stadium: Stade de Roudourou; Attendance: 4,764; Referee: Sylvain Palhies

3 October 2020 6	Grenoble	2–0	Valenciennes	Grenoble
19:00 CEST (UTC+2)	Diallo 30'; Ravet 58' (pen.); Nestor (yellow card) 80'; Gaspar (yellow card) 89'	Report	Cuffaut (yellow card) 53'; Picouleau (yellow card) 56'; Masson (yellow card) 78'	Stadium: Stade des Alpes; Attendance: 1,230; Referee: (France) Romain Lissorgue

17 October 2020 7	Amiens	1–0	Grenoble	Amiens
19:00 CEST (UTC+2)	Blin (yellow card) 21'; Mendoza (yellow card) 43'; Odey 64'	Report	Anani (yellow card) 42'; Pickel (yellow card) 66'	Stadium: Stade de la Licorne; Attendance: 4,770; Referee: (France) Stéphanie Frappart

7 November 2020 8	Grenoble	2–1	Le Havre	Grenoble
15:00 CEST (UTC+2)	Tapoko 40'; Gaspar (yellow card) 61'; Willy Semedo 82'	Report	Bentil (yellow card) 43'; Ben Mohamed (yellow card) 55'; Basque (yellow card) 64'; Mbemba 90+4'	Stadium: Stade des Alpes; Attendance: 0 Referee: (France) Eric Wattellier

21 November 2020 9	Pau	0–2	Grenoble	Pau
19:00 CEST (UTC+2)	Assifuah (yellow card) 43'; Armand (yellow card) 63'; Lobry (yellow card) 76'	Report	Nestor 24'; Monfray (yellow card) 26'; Bénet 38' (pen.) (yellow card) 71'	Stadium: Stade du Hameau; Attendance: 0 Referee: (France) Nicolas Rainville

24 November 2020 10	Grenoble	1–0	Nancy	Grenoble
19:00 CEST (UTC+2)	Diallo 38'	Report	Biron (yellow card) 32'; Latouchent (yellow card) 54'; Bondo (red card) 87'; Cissokho (yellow card) 90'	Stadium: Stade des Alpes; Attendance: 0 Referee: (France) Gaël Angoula

28 November 2020 11	Grenoble	0–0	Paris FC	Grenoble
15:00 CEST (UTC+2)	Gaspar (yellow card) 41'; Ravet (yellow card) 75'	Report	Abdi (yellow card) 14'; Guilavogui (yellow card) 17'; Belaud (yellow card) 44'; López (yellow card) 64'	Stadium: Stade des Alpes; Attendance: 0 Referee: (France) Ruddy Buquet

1 December 2020 12	Châteauroux	0–1	Grenoble	Châteauroux
19:00 CEST (UTC+2)	Cissé (yellow card) 42' (yellow-red card) 77'	Report	Ravet (yellow card) 77'; Straalman (yellow card) 83'; Diallo 87'	Stadium: Stade Gaston Petit; Attendance: 0 Referee: (France) Olivier Thual

5 December 2020 13	Caen	1–1	Grenoble	Caen
19:00 CEST (UTC+2)	Gonçalves (yellow card) 7'; Alexandre Mendy (yellow card) 35'; Court 76' (pen.); Vandermersch (yellow card) 90+4'	Report	Ravet 11'; Gaspar (yellow card) 24'; Mombris (yellow card) 42'; Diallo (yellow card) 68'; Nestor (yellow card) 74'; Perez (yellow card) 90+5'	Stadium: Stade Michel d'Ornano; Attendance: 0 Referee: (France) Alexandre Perreau Niel

12 December 2020 14	Grenoble	4–0	Dunkerque	Grenoble
19:00 CEST (UTC+2)	Willy Semedo 43'; Djitté 51'; Nestor 70'; Tapoko (yellow card) 87'; Anani 90+1' (yellow card) 90+3'	Report	Pierre (yellow card) 64'; Kerrouche (yellow card) 65'	Stadium: Stade des Alpes; Attendance: 0 Referee: (Switzerland) Alessandro Dudic

15 December 2020 15	Niort	0–0	Grenoble	Niort
20:00 CEST (UTC+2)	Kilama (red card) 11'; Louiserre (yellow card) 87'	Report		Stadium: Stade René Gaillard; Attendance: 0 Referee: (France) Mehdi Mokhtari

18 December 2020 16	Sochaux	1–1	Grenoble	Montbéliard
20:00 CEST (UTC+2)	Ourega (yellow card) 12'; Thioune (yellow card) 14'; Bedia (red card) 32'; Lasme 40'; Pogba (yellow card) 45+3'; Ambri (yellow card) 74'	Report	Djitté 17' (yellow card) 61'; Mombris (yellow card) 27'; Tapoko (yellow card) 38'	Stadium: Stade Auguste Bonal; Attendance: 0 Referee: (France) Benjamin Lepaysant

22 December 2020 17	Grenoble	2–0	Troyes	Grenoble
20:00 CEST (UTC+2)	Nestor (yellow card) 39'; Pickel (yellow card) 62'; Diallo 72'; Bénet 76' (pen.)	Report	El Hajjam (yellow card) 43'; Mutombo (red card) 58'; Kouamé (yellow card) 75'; Giraudon (yellow card) 88'	Stadium: Stade des Alpes; Attendance: 0 Referee: (France) Pierre Gaillouste

5 January 2021 18	Clermont	3–0	Grenoble	Clermont-Ferrand
20:00 CEST (UTC+2)	Hountondji 14'; Dossou 77'; Seidu (yellow card) 88'; Gomis (yellow card) 90+2'; Bayo 90+4'	Report	Bénet (yellow card) 58'; Mombris (yellow card) 71'; Anani (yellow card) 71'; Djitté (yellow card) 86'	Stadium: Stade Gabriel Montpied; Attendance: 0 Referee: (France) Sylvain Palhies

9 January 2021 19	Grenoble	2–2	Auxerre	Grenoble
15:00 CET (UTC+2)	Anani 79'; Nestor 90+3'	Report	Le Bihan 23', (penalty missed) 61'; Sakhi 50'; Coeff (yellow card) 45+1'; Ndom (red card) 85'; Bernard (yellow card) 90+2'	Stadium: Stade des Alpes; Referee: Bartolomeu Varela

16 January 2021 20	Toulouse	2–0	Grenoble	Toulouse
15:00 CET (UTC+1)	Koné (yellow card) 36'; Bayo 65'; Adli 73'	Report	Abdallah (yellow card) 51'; Monfray (yellow card) 64'; Pickel (yellow card) 71'	Stadium: Stadium de Toulouse; Referee: Romain Lissorgue

23 January 2021 21	Grenoble	2–0	Chambly	Grenoble
19:00 CET (UTC+2)	Straalman (yellow card) 39'; Monfray (yellow card) 51'; Ravet 68'; Anani 90+1'	Report	Gonzalez (yellow card) 42'; Derrien (yellow card) 67'; Camelo (yellow card) 74'	Stadium: Stade des Alpes; Referee: Pierre Gaillouste

30 January 2021 22	Ajaccio	2–1	Grenoble	Ajaccio
19:00 CET (UTC+1)	Diallo (yellow card) 55'; Bayala 59' (pen.); Laçi (yellow card) 61'; Barreto 67'	Report	Monfray (yellow card) 37'; Tapoko (yellow card) 43'; Djitté 62'; Néry (yellow card) 80'	Stadium: Stade François Coty; Referee: Alexandre Perreau Niel

2 February 2021 23	Grenoble	2–1	Guingamp	Grenoble
20:00 CET (UTC+2)	Tapoko (yellow card) 35'; Diallo (yellow card) 40'; Ravet 56'; Semedo 90+1'	Report	Y. Gomis 43'; Rodelin (yellow card) 45+3'	Stadium: Stade des Alpes; Referee: Benjamin Lepaysant

5 February 2021 24	Valenciennes	0–1	Grenoble	Valenciennes
20:00 CET (UTC+1)	Ntim (yellow card) 62'; Kankava (yellow card) 69'; Cuffaut (yellow card) 84'	Report	Henen (yellow card) 3'; Néry (yellow card) 31'; Perez (yellow card) 49'; Ntim 74' (o.g.)	Stadium: Stade du Hainaut; Referee: Sylvain Palhies

13 February 2021 25	Grenoble	0–0	Amiens	Grenoble
19:00 CET (UTC+2)	Djitté (yellow card) 40'; Semedo (yellow card) 60'; Perez (yellow card) 86'; Anani (red card) 90+2'	Report	Lomotey (yellow card) 88'	Stadium: Stade des Alpes; Referee: Romain Delpech

20 February 2021 26	Nancy	1–2	Grenoble	Tomblaine
19:00 CET (UTC+1)	Haag 23'; Scheidler (yellow card) 81'	Report	Pickel (yellow card) 36'; Bénet 79' (pen.); Djitté 90+3'	Stadium: Stade Marcel Picot; Referee: Jérôme Miguelgorry

27 February 2021 27	Grenoble	1–1	Niort	Grenoble
19:00 CET (UTC+1)	Monfray (yellow card) 19'; Mombris (yellow card) 44'; Djitté 84'; Abdallah (yellow card) 90+2'	Report	Bâ 20' (pen.); Doukansy (yellow card) 32'	Stadium: Stade des Alpes; Referee: Gaël Angoula

2 March 2021 28	Le Havre	0–2	Grenoble	Le Havre
20:00 CET (UTC+1)	Bonnet (yellow card) 52'; Boutaïb (yellow card) 76'; Lekhal (yellow card) 86'	Report	Semedo 18'; Belmonte 69'	Stadium: Stade Océane; Referee: Mehdi Mokhtari

13 March 2021 29	Grenoble	1–1	Pau	Grenoble
20:00 CET (UTC+1)	Djitté (yellow card) 58'; Gaspar (yellow card) 65'; Anani 66'; Bénet (yellow card) 82'	Report	Sabaly (yellow card) 55'; Armand 90+3'	Stadium: Stade des Alpes; Referee: Abdelatif Kherradji

20 March 2021 30	Paris FC	2–0	Grenoble	Paris
20:00 CET (UTC+1)	Gakpa (yellow card) 29'; López (yellow card) 44'; Hanin 66'; Diakité (red card) 69'; Martin 81'	Report		Stadium: Stade Sébastien Charléty; Referee: Nicolas Rainville

3 April 2021 31	Grenoble	2–2	Châteauroux	Grenoble
20:00 CET (UTC+1)	Ravet (yellow card) 18'; Djitté 25'; Bénet 31', (yellow card) 51'; Monfray (yellow card) 37' (yellow-red card) 74'; Tapoko (yellow card) 40'	Report	Sunu (red card) 26'; Ibara 36'; Tormin 54'	Stadium: Stade des Alpes; Referee: Amaury Delerue

10 April 2021 32	Grenoble	3–1	Caen	Grenoble
20:00 CET (UTC+1)	Pickel 49'; Ravet 74'; Straalman 81'	Report	Rivierez (yellow card) 61'; Hountondji 70'; Deminguet (yellow card) 87'	Stadium: Stade des Alpes; Referee: Romain Delpech

17 April 2021 33	Dunkerque	1–1	Grenoble	Dunkerque
20:00 CEST (UTC+2)	Cissé (yellow card) 30'; Huysman 33'; Boudaud (yellow card) 65'	Report	Anani 26'; Diallo (yellow card) 34' (yellow-red card) 55'; Mombris (red card) 56'	Stadium: Stade Marcel-Tribut; Referee: Syvain Palhies

20 April 2021 34	Grenoble	2–0	Sochaux	Grenoble
20:00 CET (UTC+1)	Bénet 13' (pen.), 78' (pen.); Djitté (yellow card) 38'; Tapoko (yellow card) 65'; H. Demba (yellow card) 82'	Report	Ambri (yellow card) 61'; Ourega (yellow card) 78'	Stadium: Stade des Alpes; Referee: Bartolomeu Varela

24 April 2021 35	Troyes	3–1	Grenoble	Troyes
15:00 CEST (UTC+2)	Touzghar 10', 24'; Azamoum (yellow card) 22'; Giraudon (yellow card) 32'; Salmier (yellow card) 53'; Tardieu 72' (pen.), (yellow card) 88'	Report	Belmonte 7'; Anani (yellow card) 32'; Djitté (yellow card) 86'	Stadium: Stade de l'Aube; Referee: Romain Lissorgue

1 May 2021 36	Grenoble	1–2	Clermont	Grenoble
20:45 CET (UTC+1)	Gaspar (yellow card) 5'; Semedo 90+1' (pen.)	Report	Allevinah 19'; Bayo (penalty missed) 45+2', 45+2'	Stadium: Stade des Alpes; Referee: Jérôme Miguelgorry

8 May 2021 37	Auxerre	1–1	Grenoble	Auxerre
20:00 CEST (UTC+2)	Le Bihan 39'; Hein (penalty missed) 90+8'	Report	Jubal Jr. 3' (o.g.); Belmonte (yellow card) 75'; Abdallah (yellow card) 90+6'	Stadium: Stade de l'Abbé-Deschamps; Referee: Olivier Thual

15 May 2021 38	Grenoble	1–0	Rodez	Grenoble
20:00 CET (UTC+1)	Gaspar (yellow card) 11'; Bénet 77' (pen.)	Report	Roche (yellow card) 38'; Poujol (yellow card) 56'	Stadium: Stade des Alpes; Referee: Nicolas Rainville

=== Coupe de France ===
20 January 2021 Eighth round	Clermont	1–1 (2–4 p)	Grenoble	Clermont-Ferrand
13:45 CET (UTC+1)	Tell 33'	Report	Mombris 32'	Stadium: Stade Gabriel Montpied; Attendance: 0 Referee: Olivier Thual
	Penalties
	Berthomier (penalty scored); Allevinah (penalty missed); Magnin (penalty missed); Rajot (penalty scored)		(penalty scored) Tapoko; (penalty scored) Semedo; (penalty scored) Pickel; (penalty scored) Straalman

10 February 2021 Round of 64	Grenoble	0–1	Monaco	Grenoble
14:45 CET (UTC+1)	Diallo (yellow card) 29'; Belmonte (yellow card) 48'	Report	Pellegri (yellow card) 11'; Jovetić 36'	Stadium: Stade des Alpes; Attendance: 0 Referee: Bastien Dechepy
