= Metehan Güçlü =

Footballer (born 1999)

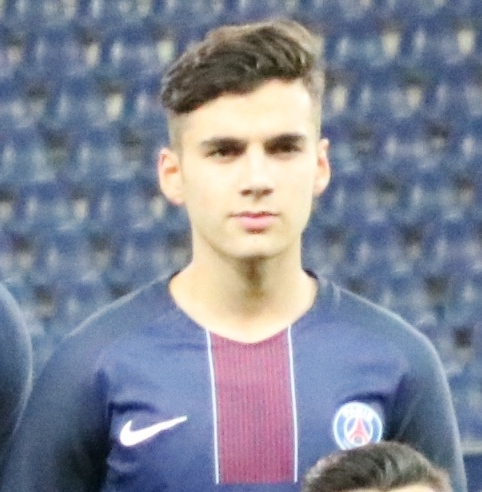
- Güçlü with Paris Saint-Germain U19 in 2017

Personal information
- Date of birth: 2 April 1999 (age 27)
- Place of birth: Montfermeil, France
- Height: 1.82 m (6 ft 0 in)
- Position: Forward

Team information
- Current team: US Le Pays du Valois
- Number: 25

Youth career
- 2008–2012: AS Bondy
- 2012–2018: Paris Saint-Germain

Senior career*
Years	Team	Apps	(Gls)
2017–2019	Paris Saint-Germain B	26	(11)
2019	Paris Saint-Germain	1	(1)
2019–2022	Rennes	0	(0)
2020–2021	→ Valenciennes (loan)	12	(0)
2022	→ Emmen (loan)	9	(2)
2022–2023	Emmen	1	(0)
2023–2024	Roda JC	18	(1)
2024–2025	Villefranche	2	(0)
2025–	US Le Pays du Valois	8	(3)

International career
2016	Turkey U17	3	(2)
2016	Turkey U18	2	(0)
2018	Turkey U19	7	(1)
2020	Turkey U21	1	(0)
- * Club domestic league appearances and goals as of 6 December 2025

Metehan Güçlü (born 2 April 1999) is a professional footballer who plays as a forward for French Championnat National 3 club US Le Pays du Valois. Born in France, he represents Turkey at international level.

== Club career ==
=== Paris Saint-Germain ===
Güçlü began his footballing career in the youth academy of AS Bondy at the age of 9, before moving to the Paris Saint-Germain Academy in 2012. He signed his first professional contract with Paris Saint-Germain on 21 February 2019.

On 17 April 2019, Güçlü made his professional debut by scoring a goal in PSG's 3–2 away loss to Nantes in Ligue 1. He replaced Layvin Kurzawa in the 74th minute of the game and netted his first goal 15 minutes later.

=== Rennes ===
On 31 August 2019, Güçlü joined Rennes on a free transfer containing a sell-on percentage fee clause.

On 9 July 2020, Ligue 2 side Valenciennes announced the signing of Güçlü from Rennes on a season-long loan deal.

On 1 February 2022, Güçlü moved on loan to Dutch club Emmen. He signed for the club on a permanent transfer on 22 July.

=== Roda ===
On 4 September 2023, Güçlü joined Roda JC on an amateur contract.

=== Villefranche ===
On 5 August 2024, Güçlü signed with Villefranche.

== International career ==
Güçlü was born in France and is of Turkish descent, and holds both passports. He is a youth international for Turkey.

== Personal life ==
Güçlü's older brother, Ayhan Güçlü, is a former professional footballer and youth international for Turkey.

== Career statistics ==
As of match played 16 February 2024

Appearances and goals by club, season and competition
Club	Season	League			Cup		Other		Total	
Club	Season	Division	Apps	Goals	Apps	Goals	Apps	Goals	Apps	Goals
Paris Saint-Germain B	2016–17	National 2	1	0	—		—		1	0
Paris Saint-Germain B	2017–18	National 2	6	0	—		—		6	0
Paris Saint-Germain B	2018–19	National 2	19	11	—		—		19	11
Paris Saint-Germain B	Total		26	11	—		—		26	11
Paris Saint-Germain	2018–19	Ligue 1	1	1	0	0	0	0	1	1
Rennes	2019–20	Ligue 1	0	0	0	0	0	0	0	0
Valenciennes (loan)	2020–21	Ligue 2	12	0	0	0	—		12	0
Emmen (loan)	2021–22	Eerste Divisie	9	2	0	0	—		9	2
Emmen	2022–23	Eredivisie	1	0	0	0	0	0	1	0
Roda JC	2023–24	Eerste Divisie	18	1	1	0	1 (Note: Appearances in Eredivisie promotion/relegation playoffs)	0	20	1
Career total			67	15	1	0	01	0	69	15

== Honours ==
Paris Saint-Germain

- Ligue 1: 2018–19

Emmen

- Eerste Divisie: 2021–22
