= Willy Semedo =

Cape Verdean footballer (born 1994)

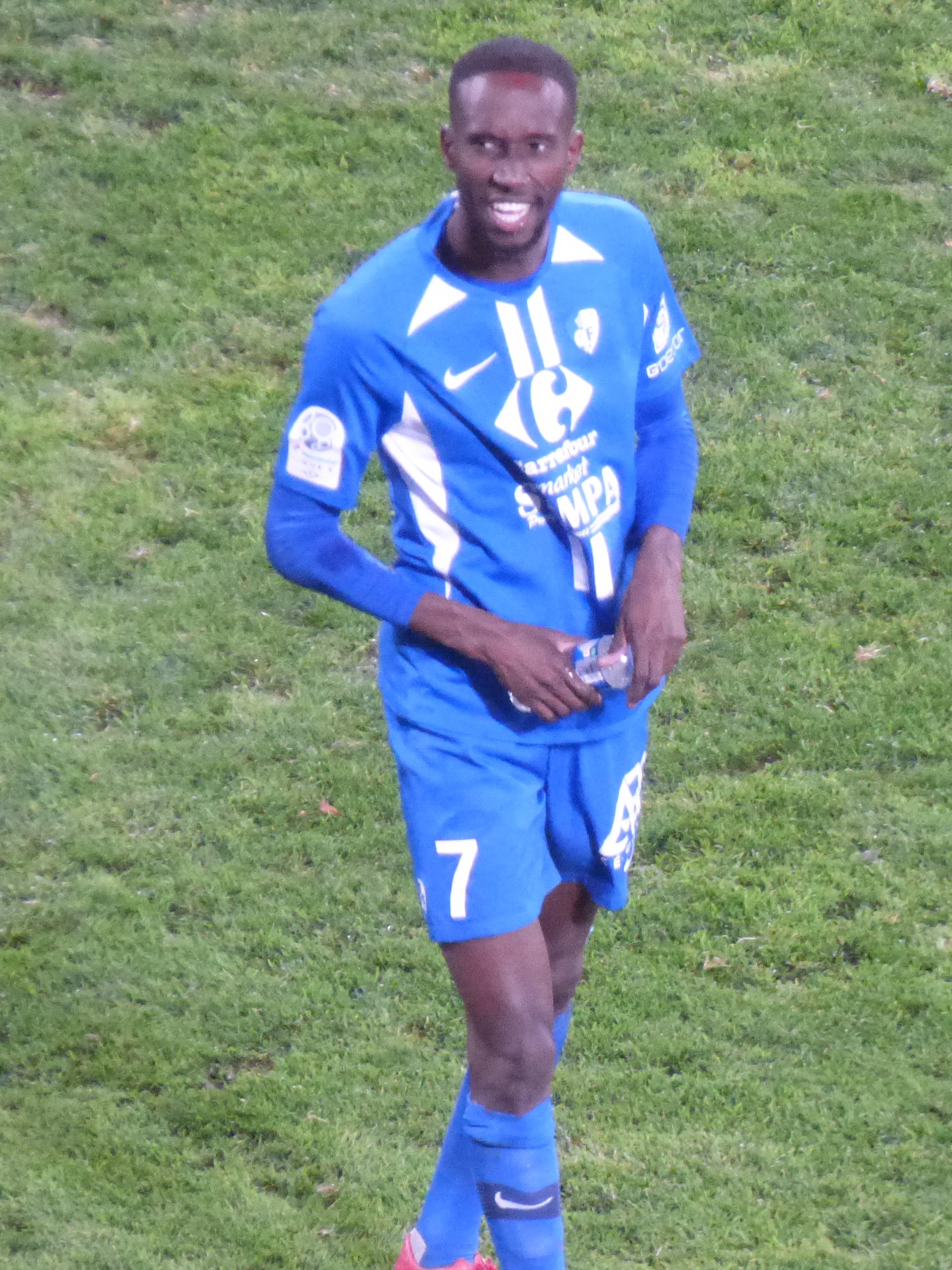
- Semedo in 2020

Personal information
- Full name: Willy Johnson Semedo Afonso
- Date of birth: 27 April 1994 (age 32)
- Place of birth: Montfermeil, France
- Height: 1.85 m (6 ft 1 in)
- Position: Winger

Team information
- Current team: United
- Number: 10

Senior career*
Years	Team	Apps	(Gls)
2014–2018	Alki Oroklini	96	(28)
2018	Charleroi	2	(0)
2018	→ Roeselare (loan)	11	(0)
2019	Politehnica Iași	10	(0)
2019–2021	Grenoble	58	(10)
2021–2023	Pafos	44	(8)
2023	Al-Faisaly	13	(2)
2023–2026	Omonia	90	(36)
2026–	United	5	(3)

International career^{‡}
2020–	Cape Verde	41	(3)
- * Club domestic league appearances and goals as of 16:30, 28 September 2026 (UTC) ‡ National team caps and goals as of 4 July 2026

Willy Johnson Semedo Afonso (Portuguese: [ˈwi.li ˈʤɔn.sɔn sɨ.ˈme.du ɐ.ˈfõ.su]; born 27 April 1994) is a professional footballer who plays as a winger for UAE Pro League side United. Born in France, he plays for the Cape Verde national team.

== Club career ==
On 31 January 2018, Semedo signed with Charleroi after a successful spell with the Cypriot club Alki Oroklini. He made his debut for the Belgium club in a 2–2 Belgian First Division A draw with K.R.C. Genk, on 13 April 2018.

On 30 August 2018, Semedo was loaned to Belgian First Division B club Roeselare, for half a season, in order for him to get more playing time. On 1 February 2019, he moved to Liga I side Politehnica Iași. Semedo subsequently signed a six-month contract with the Romanian club.

In July 2019, Semedo signed for Ligue 2 club Grenoble on a two-year contract, where he scored 11 goals in 61 total appearances. He then moved to Cypriot club Pafos FC on a free transfer, where he totalled 20 goal contributions in 48 games.

On 28 January 2023, Semedo signed for Saudi Arabian club Al-Faisaly, however, at the end of the season he returned to Cyprus, this time for 21-time domestic champions Omonia. The 2023–24 season was Semedo's best in terms of goal contributions, as he scored 14 and assisted 7 in 38 appearances in all competitions.

== International career ==
Born in France, Semedo is of Cape Verdean descent. On 1 October 2020, Semedo was called by Cape Verde. He made his international debut in a friendly 2–1 win over Andorra on 7 October 2020.

Since then, Semedo has featured for Cape Verde in the 2021 Africa Cup of Nations, the 2022 and 2026 World Cup qualifiers, as well as the 2023 Africa Cup of Nations, where he helped Cape Verde reach the quarter-finals, equalling the team's best performance in the tournament.

On 18 May 2026, he was called up by Cape Verde's head coach Bubista for the 2026 FIFA World Cup.

== Career statistics ==
=== Club ===
As of match played 10 May 2026

Appearances and goals by club, season and competition
Club	Season	League			National cup (Note: Includes Coupe de France, Cypriot Cup)		Continental		Other		Total	
Club	Season	Division	Apps	Goals	Apps	Goals	Apps	Goals	Apps	Goals	Apps	Goals
Grenoble	2020–21	Ligue 1	2	1	1	0	—		—		3	1
Pafos	2021–22	Cypriot First Division	26	4	1	0	—		—		27	4
Pafos	2022–23	Cypriot First Division	18	4	1	1	—		—		19	5
Pafos	Total		44	8	2	1	—		—		46	9
Al Faisaly	2022–23	Saudi First Division League	2	2	—		1 (Note: Appearance in AFC Champions League)	0	—		3	2
Omonia	2023–24	Cypriot First Division	29	12	4	2	4 (Note: Appearances in UEFA Conference League)	0	1 (Note: Appearance in Cypriot Super Cup)	0	38	14
Omonia	2024–25	Cypriot First Division	33	7	3	1	11	6	—		47	14
Omonia	2025–26	Cypriot First Division	28	17	1	0	12	5	—		41	22
Omonia	Total		90	36	8	3	27	11	1	0	126	50
Career total			128	42	10	4	28	11	1	0	164	57

=== International ===
As of match played 3 July 2026

Appearances and goals by national team and year
National team	Year	Apps	Goals
Cape Verde	2020	2	0
Cape Verde	2021	5	0
Cape Verde	2022	7	0
Cape Verde	2023	6	0
Cape Verde	2024	7	0
Cape Verde	2025	8	2
Cape Verde	2026	6	1
Total		41	3

Scores and results list Cape Verde's goal tally first, score column indicates score after each Semedo goal.

List of international goals scored by Willy Semedo
No.	Date	Venue	Opponent	Score	Result	Competition
1	8 October 2025	Tripoli Stadium, Tripoli, Libya	Libya	3–3	3–3	2026 FIFA World Cup qualification
2	13 October 2025	Estádio Nacional de Cabo Verde, Praia, Cape Verde	Eswatini	2–0	3–0	2026 FIFA World Cup qualification
3	6 June 2026	Pratt & Whitney Stadium at Rentschler Field, East Hartford, United States	Bermuda	1–0	3–0	Friendly

== Honours ==
Omonia

- Cypriot First Division: 2025–26
