= Sessi D'Almeida =

Beninese footballer (born 1995)

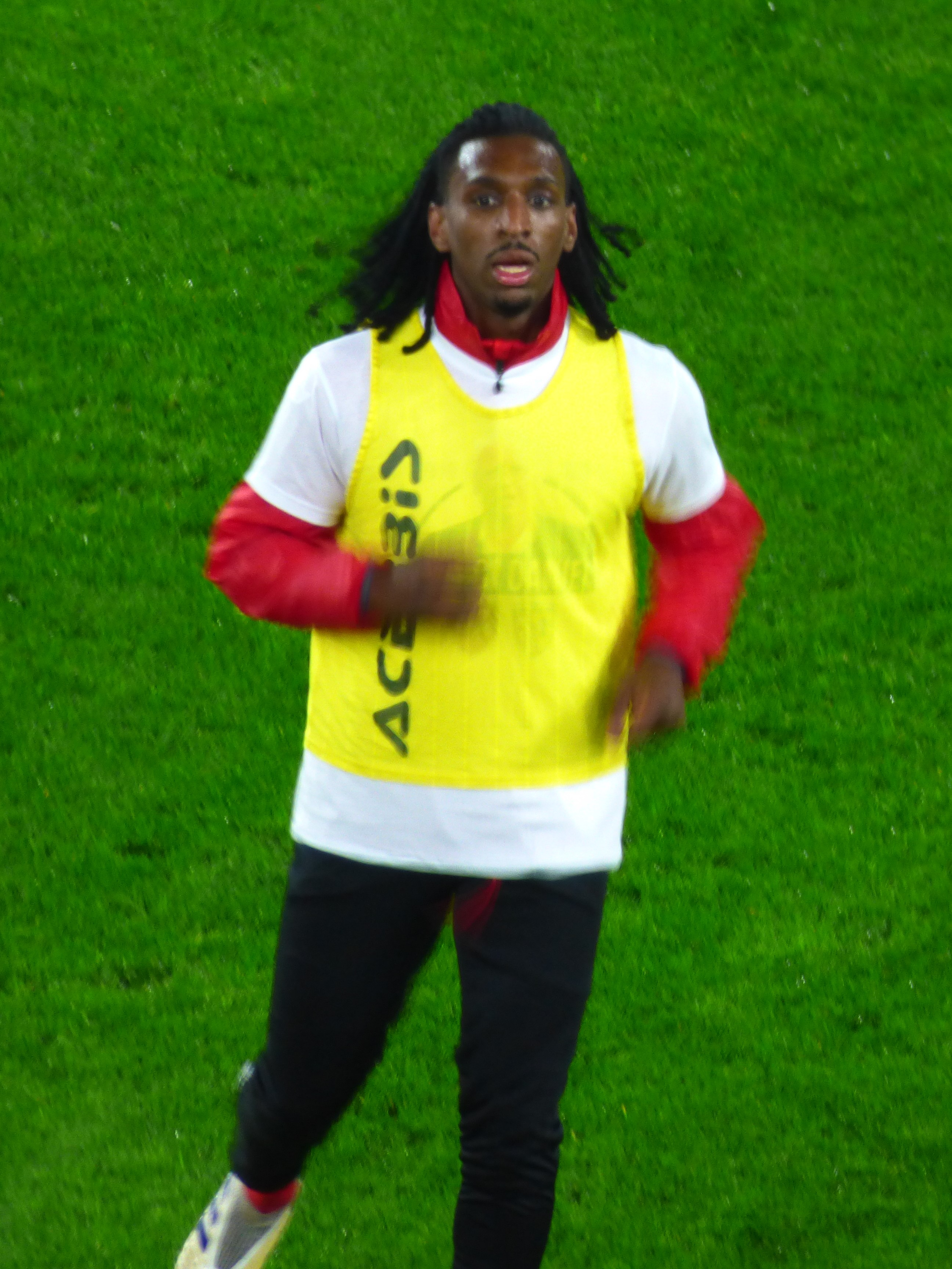
- D'Almeida with Valenciennes in 2019

Personal information
- Full name: Sessi Octave Emile D'Almeida
- Date of birth: 20 November 1995 (age 30)
- Place of birth: Bordeaux, France
- Height: 1.78 m (5 ft 10 in)
- Position: Defensive midfielder

Team information
- Current team: Neftçi
- Number: 6

Youth career
- AL Dupaty
- US Bouscat
- 2005–2008: Bordeaux
- 2008–2009: FCE Mérignac Arlac
- 2009–2013: Bordeaux

Senior career*
Years	Team	Apps	(Gls)
2013–2015	Bordeaux B	33	(1)
2014–2015	Bordeaux	2	(0)
2015–2016	Paris Saint-Germain B	16	(0)
2016–2017	Barnsley	3	(0)
2017–2018	Blackpool	23	(0)
2018–2019	Yeovil Town	35	(1)
2019–2022	Valenciennes	55	(1)
2022	→ CD Tondela (loan)	8	(0)
2022–2024	Pau	68	(1)
2024–2025	Apollon Limassol	29	(0)
2025–	Neftçi	22	(0)

International career^{‡}
2014–	Benin	52	(1)
- * Club domestic league appearances and goals as of 20:14, 7 October 2026 (UTC) ‡ National team caps and goals as of 20:14, 7 October 2026 (UTC)

Sessi Octave Emile D'Almeida (born 20 November 1995) is a professional footballer who plays as a defensive midfielder for Azerbaijan Premier League club Neftçi. Born in France, he plays for the Benin national team.

== Club career ==
D'Almeida made his debut for Bordeaux on 12 December 2013 in the UEFA Europa League group stage against Maccabi Tel Aviv, playing the first 75 minutes in the 1–0 away defeat before being substituted for Théo Pellenard.

On 23 August 2014, he made his Ligue 1 debut for Bordeaux, replacing André Biyogo Poko for the last 9 minutes of a 3–1 away win at OGC Nice.

After a successful trial with Barnsley in the summer of 2016, D'Almeida signed a two-year deal with the Championship club.

He was released by Blackpool at the end of the 2017–18 season.

On 13 July 2018, D'Almeida signed for League Two side Yeovil Town on a one-year deal with an option of extending for a second year. At the end of the 2018–19 season, D'Almeida was released by Yeovil following the club's relegation from the Football League.

On 24 July 2019, D'Almeida returned to France to sign for Ligue 2 side Valenciennes on a two-year contract.

On 5 June 2025, Azerbaijan Premier League club Neftçi announced the signing of D'Almeida to a two-year contract, with the option of a third, from Apollon Limassol.

== International career ==
D'Almeida was called up to the Benin national team squad in 2014 for their matches for 2015 Africa Cup of Nations qualification against Sao Tome. He made his debut for Benin in a 1–1 tie against Equatorial Guinea in 2015.

== Career statistics ==
=== Club ===
As of match played 16 August 2026

Appearances and goals by club, season and competition
Club	Season	League			National cup (Note: National competitions include the FA Cup, Coupe de France, Taça de Portugal and Cypriot Cup)		League cup (Note: League Cup competitions include the EFL Cup)		Other		Total	
Club	Season	Division	Apps	Goals	Apps	Goals	Apps	Goals	Apps	Goals	Apps	Goals
Bordeaux II	2013–14	CFA	12	1	—		—		0	0	12	1
Bordeaux II	2014–15	CFA	21	0	—		—		0	0	21	0
Bordeaux II	Total		33	1	—		—		0	0	33	1
Bordeaux	2013–14	Ligue 1	0	0	0	0	0	0	1 (Note: Appearance in the UEFA Europa League)	0	1	0
Bordeaux	2014–15	Ligue 1	2	0	0	0	0	0	0	0	2	0
Bordeaux	Total		2	0	0	0	0	0	1	0	3	0
Paris Saint-Germain II	2015–16	CFA	16	0	—		—		0	0	16	0
Barnsley	2016–17	EFL Championship	3	0	0	0	0	0	0	0	3	0
Blackpool	2017–18	EFL League One	23	0	0	0	0	0	4 (Note: Appearances in the EFL Trophy)	1	27	1
Yeovil Town	2018–19	EFL League Two	35	1	1	0	1	0	0	0	37	1
Valenciennes	2019–20	Ligue 2	24	1	0	0	0	0	—		24	1
Valenciennes	2020–21	Ligue 2	23	0	3	0	—		—		26	0
Valenciennes	2021–22	Ligue 2	8	0	1	0	—		—		9	0
Valenciennes	Total		55	1	4	0	0	0	—		59	1
CD Tondela (loan)	2021–22	Primeira Liga	8	0	2	0	0	0	—		10	0
Pau FC	2022–23	Ligue 2	35	0	4	0	—		—		39	0
Pau FC	2023–24	Ligue 2	33	1	0	0	—		—		33	1
Pau FC	Total		68	1	4	0	0	0	—		72	1
Apollon Limassol	2024–25	Cypriot First Division	29	0	3	0	—		—		32	0
Neftçi	2025–26	Azerbaijan Premier League	21	0	2	1	—		—		23	1
Neftçi	2026–27	Azerbaijan Premier League	1	0	0	0	—		2 (Note: Appearances in UEFA Conference League)	0	3	0
Neftçi	Total		22	0	2	1	—		2	0	26	1
Career total			294	4	16	1	1	0	7	1	318	6

=== International ===
As of match played 6 October 2026

Appearances and goals by national team and year
National team	Year	Apps	Goals
Benin	2014	1	0
Benin	2015	2	0
Benin	2018	3	1
Benin	2019	10	0
Benin	2020	3	0
Benin	2021	3	0
Benin	2022	3	0
Benin	2023	5	0
Benin	2024	10	0
Benin	2025	9	0
Benin	2026	3	0
Total		52	1

As of match played 6 October 2026
Scores and results list Benin's goal tally first, score column indicates score after each D'Almeida goal.

List of international goals scored by Sessi D'Almeida
No.	Date	Venue	Cap	Opponent	Score	Result	Competition
1	16 October 2018	Stade de l'Amitié, Cotonou, Benin	4	Algeria	1–0	1–0	2019 Africa Cup of Nations qualification
