= Baptiste Dedola =

French footballer (born 2001)

Personal information
- Date of birth: 15 May 2001 (age 25)
- Place of birth: Sainte-Foy-lès-Lyon, France
- Height: 1.80 m (5 ft 11 in)
- Position: Forward

Team information
- Current team: Chassieu Décines

Senior career*
| Years | Team | Apps | (Gls) |
| 2019–2021 | Ajaccio II | 8 | (1) |
| 2020–2021 | Ajaccio | 2 | (0) |
| 2021–2024 | Grenoble II | | |
| 2024– | Chassieu Décines | 9 | (1) |
- * Club domestic league appearances and goals as of 7 December 2024

Baptiste Dedola (born 15 May 2001) is a French professional footballer who plays as a forward for Championnat National 3 club Chassieu Décines.

== Career ==
Dedola made his professional debut with AC Ajaccio in a 1–0 loss to LB Châteauroux on 22 August 2020.

== Personal life ==
Dedola was born in France to an Italian father and Ivorian mother.
