= Malek Chergui =

French footballer (born 1988)

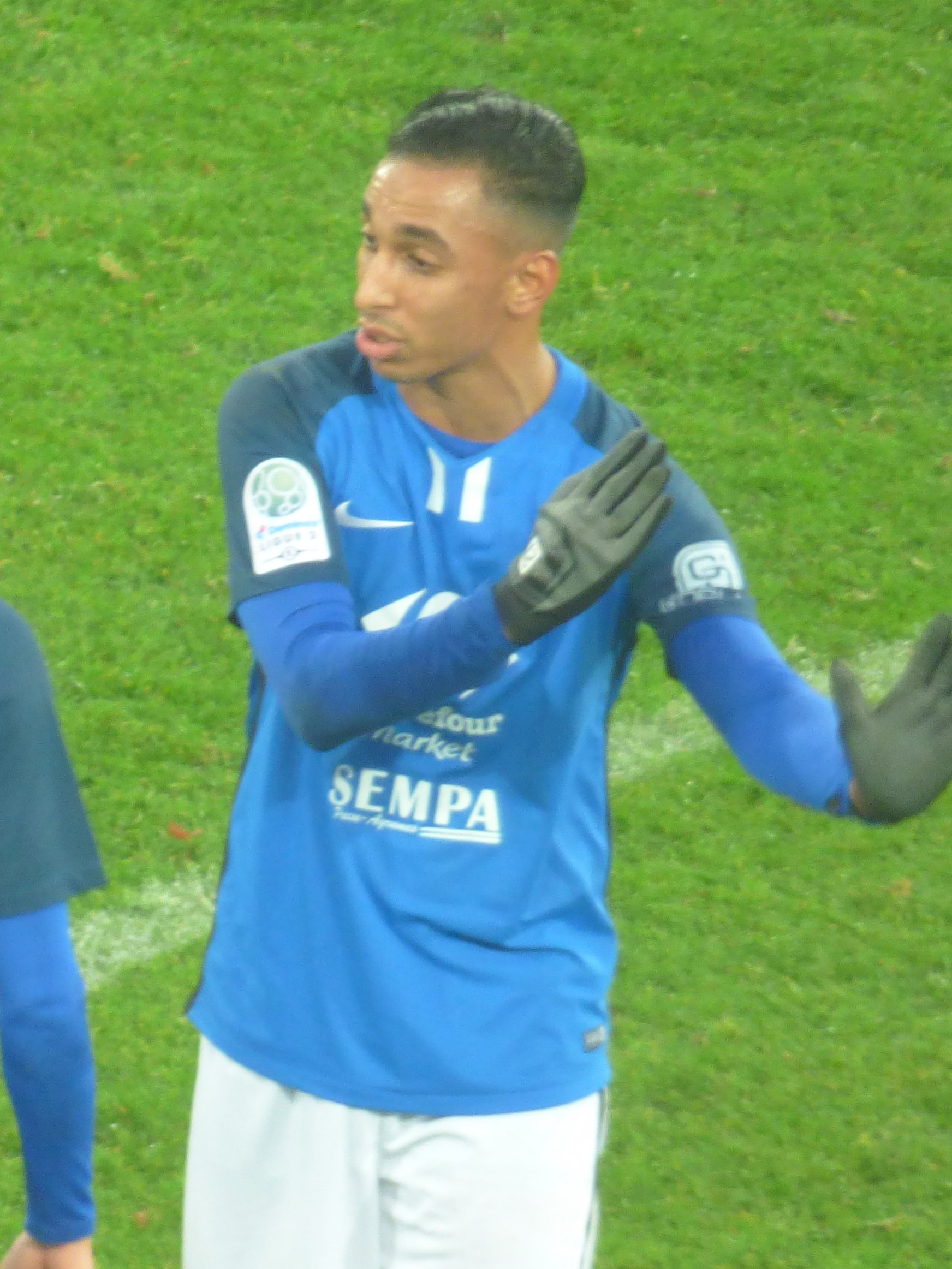
- Chergui in 2018

Personal information
- Date of birth: 2 July 1988 (age 38)
- Place of birth: Échirolles, France
- Height: 1.79 m (5 ft 10 in)
- Positions: Winger; forward

Youth career
- 2005–2008: Lyon

Senior career*
Years	Team	Apps	(Gls)
2008–2009	Jura Sud	3	(1)
2009–2011	Dijon	6	(0)
2011–2012	Grenoble	22	(11)
2012–2013	Valence	23	(6)
2013–2016	Cannes	14	(8)
2016–2017	FC Azzurri 90	2	(1)
2017–2019	Grenoble	29	(8)
2019–2021	Valenciennes	35	(4)
- * Club domestic league appearances and goals as of 15 May 2021

Malek Chergui (born 2 July 1988) is a French professional footballer who plays as a forward.

== Professional career ==
Formed in Dijon FCO, had two stints with Grenoble in 2011–12 and again after 2017 where he helped promoted them into the Ligue 2.

== Personal life ==
Chergui was born in Échirolles, France. He holds French and Algerian nationalities.
