= Tony Njiké =

French footballer (born 1998)

Personal information
- Full name: Tony Wilfried Nyandjou Njiké
- Date of birth: 29 January 1998 (age 28)
- Place of birth: Paris, France
- Height: 1.78 m (5 ft 10 in)
- Position: Defensive midfielder

Team information
- Current team: Farul Constanța
- Number: 23

Youth career
- 2004–2006: FC de Montataire
- 2006–2013: Chantilly
- 2013–2017: Bordeaux

Senior career*
Years	Team	Apps	(Gls)
2015–2019	Bordeaux B	32	(0)
2019–2020	Ajaccio B	16	(0)
2020–2022	Ajaccio	18	(1)
2021–2022	→ Cholet (loan)	30	(3)
2022–2023	Argeș Pitești	34	(0)
2023–2024	Châteauroux	29	(3)
2024–2026	Quevilly-Rouen	46	(0)
2026–	Farul Constanța	15	(0)
- * Club domestic league appearances and goals as of 7 November 2026

Tony Wilfried Nyandjou Njiké (born 29 January 1998) is a French professional footballer who plays as a defensive midfielder for Liga I club Farul Constanța.

== Club career ==
Njiké is a youth product of Bordeaux, having joined their youth academy in 2013. He signed his first professional contract with Ajaccio on 12 February 2020. He made his professional debut with Ajaccio in a 1–0 loss to Châteauroux on 22 August 2020.

On 21 June 2022, Njiké signed a two-year contract with Argeș Pitești in Romania.

== International career ==
Born in France, Njiké is of Cameroonian descent. In 2017, he was called up to represent the Cameroon U20s.

== Career statistics ==
As of match played 7 November 2026

Appearances and goals by club, season and competition
Club	Season	League			National cup (Note: Includes Coupe de France, Cupa României)		Europe		Other		Total	
Club	Season	Division	Apps	Goals	Apps	Goals	Apps	Goals	Apps	Goals	Apps	Goals
Bordeaux B	2015–16	CFA 2	3	0	–		–		–		3	0
Bordeaux B	2016–17	CFA 2	6	0	–		–		–		6	0
Bordeaux B	2017–18	Championnat National 3	23	0	–		–		–		23	0
Bordeaux B	2018–19	Championnat National 2	0	0	–		–		–		0	0
Bordeaux B	Total		32	0	–		–		–		32	0
Ajaccio B	2019–20	Championnat National 3	16	0	–		–		–		16	0
Ajaccio	2019–20	Ligue 2	0	0	1	0	–		0	0	1	0
Ajaccio	2020–21	Ligue 2	18	1	1	0	–		–		19	1
Ajaccio	Total		18	1	2	0	–		0	0	20	1
Cholet (loan)	2021–22	Championnat National	30	3	3	0	–		–		33	3
Argeș Pitești	2022–23	Liga I	34	0	2	0	–		1 (Note: Appearance in Liga I promotion/relegation play-offs)	0	37	0
Châteauroux	2023–24	Championnat National	29	3	5	0	–		–		34	3
Quevilly-Rouen	2024–25	Championnat National	21	0	4	0	–		–		25	0
Quevilly-Rouen	2025–26	Championnat National	25	0	1	0	–		–		26	0
Quevilly-Rouen	Total		46	0	5	0	–		–		51	0
Farul Constanța	2026–27	Liga I	15	0	0	0	–		–		15	0
Career Total			220	7	17	0	–		1	0	238	7

== Honours ==
Bordeaux B

- Championnat National 3: 2017–18
