= Jérôme Mombris =

Association football player (born 1987)

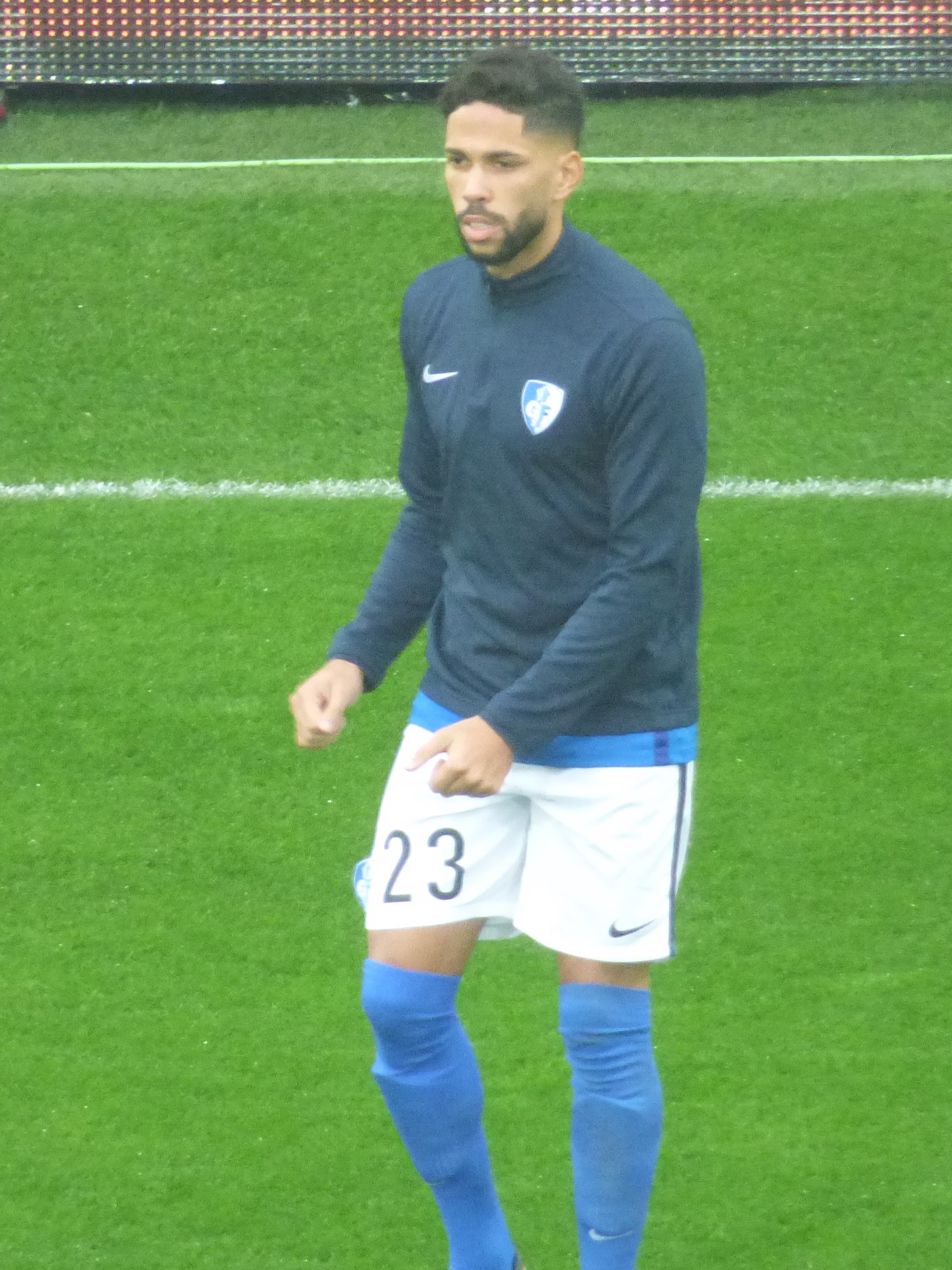
- Mombris in 2018

Personal information
- Date of birth: 27 November 1987 (age 38)
- Place of birth: Saint-Brieuc, France
- Height: 1.78 m (5 ft 10 in)
- Position: Defender

Team information
- Current team: Gazélec Ajaccio

Senior career*
Years	Team	Apps	(Gls)
2008–2011	Plabennec	111	(3)
2011–2012	Avranches	34	(0)
2012–2015	Le Havre B	27	(0)
2012–2016	Le Havre	115	(3)
2016–2018	Gazélec Ajaccio	69	(3)
2018–2021	Grenoble	97	(0)
2021–2022	Guingamp	7	(0)
2022	JS Saint-Pierroise	0	(0)
2022–	Gazélec Ajaccio	9	(0)
Total		460	(9)

International career
2017–2021	Madagascar	23	(0)
- * Club domestic league appearances and goals

Jérôme Mombris Razanapiera (born 27 November 1987) is a professional footballer who plays as a defender for Gazélec Ajaccio. Born in France, he represented Madagascar at international level.

== Club career ==
On 19 August 2021, he signed a two-year contract with Guingamp. He announced his retirement on 3 January 2022 due to "personal reasons". He later reverted on his decision and went on to sign for local Reunion club JS Saint-Pierroise. After a short stint there, et made a return to corsica and signed for Gazélec Ajaccio for a second time, in French fifth division, after the club suffered multiple relegations.

== International career ==
Mombris was born in France to a Reunionnais father, and is of Malagasy descent through his grandfather. He made his debut for the Madagascar national football team in a friendly 1–1 tie with Comoros on 11 November 2017. He played at 2019 Africa Cup of Nations when Madagascar made a sensational advance to the quarterfinals.

== Career statistics ==
=== International ===
As of matches played 7 September 2021

Team	Year	Apps	Goals
Madagascar	2017	1	0
Madagascar	2018	5	0
Madagascar	2019	11	0
Madagascar	2020	2	0
Madagascar	2021	4	0
Total		23	0
