= Arsène Elogo =

Cameroonian footballer

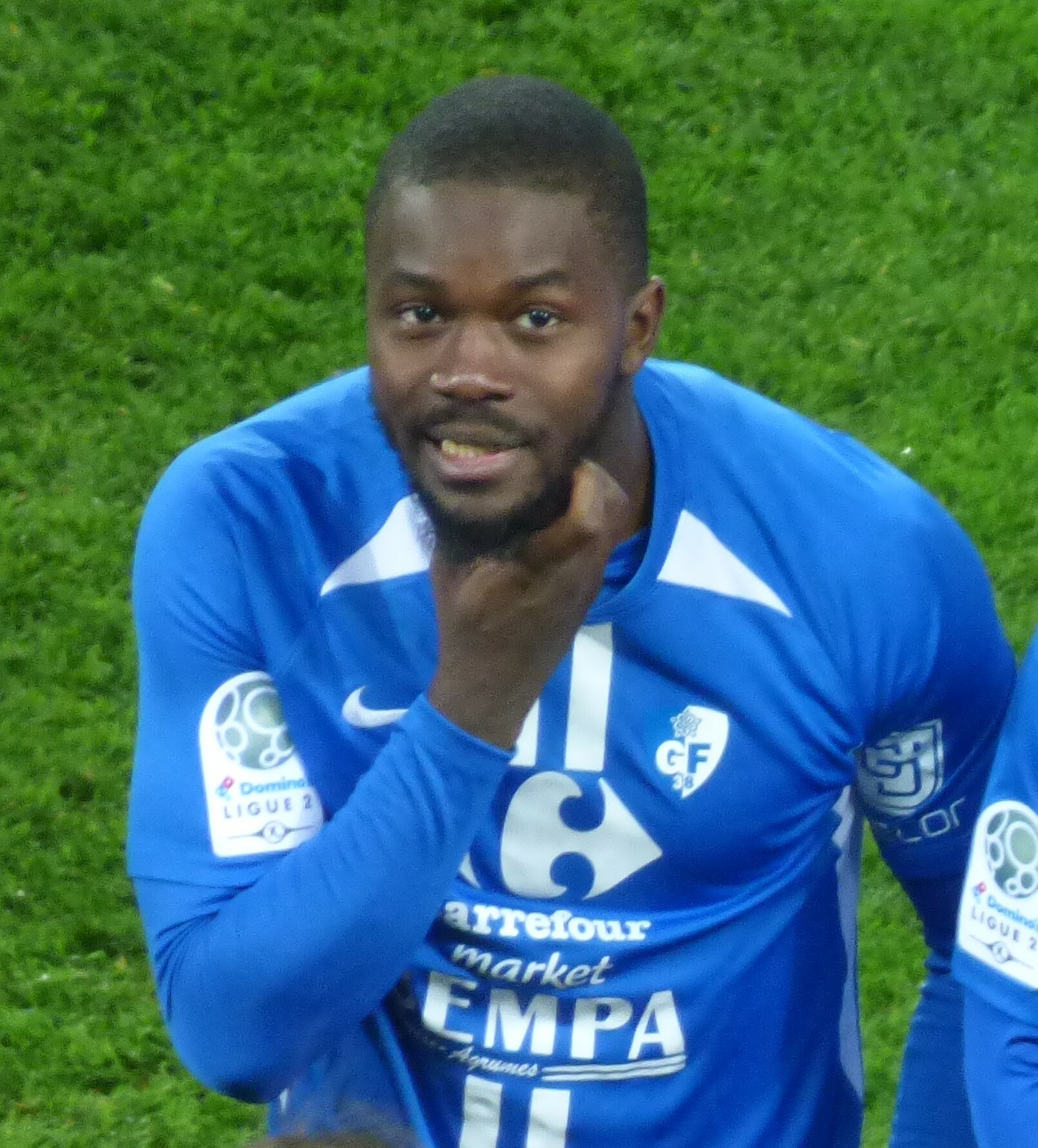
- Elogo in 2018

Personal information
- Full name: Arsène Elogo Guintangui
- Date of birth: 22 April 1995 (age 31)
- Place of birth: Douala, Cameroon
- Height: 1.79 m (5 ft 10 in)
- Position: Midfielder

Team information
- Current team: Créteil
- Number: 15

Youth career
- 2011–2012: Grenoble
- 2012–2015: Saint-Étienne

Senior career*
Years	Team	Apps	(Gls)
2013–2015	Saint-Étienne II	44	(3)
2015–2020	Grenoble	130	(14)
2020–2022	Valennciennes	32	(1)
2022–2023	Le Puy	28	(2)
2023–2024	Becamex Binh Duong	10	(0)
2024	Haiphong	6	(0)
2024–2025	Hyères	23	(2)
2025–	Créteil	10	(2)
- * Club domestic league appearances and goals as of 13 February 2026

Arsène Elogo Guintangui (born 22 April 1995) is a Cameroonian professional footballer who plays as a midfielder for French Championnat National 1 club Créteil.

== Career ==
Elogo was a youth product of Grenoble before moving briefly to Saint-Étienne in 2012, and returned to Grenoble in 2015. He made his professional debut with Grenoble in a 2–1 Coupe de la Ligue loss to FC Metz on 14 August 2018.

On 16 June 2022, Elogo signed with Le Puy.

In October 2023, Elogo signed for V.League 1 club Becamex Binh Duong.
