= Moussa Djitté =

Senegalese footballer (born 1999)

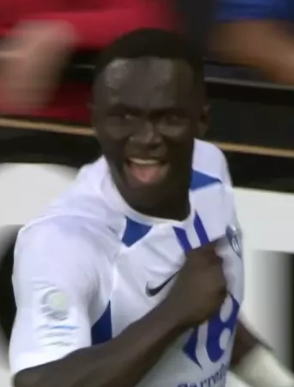
- Djitté with Grenoble in July 2019

Personal information
- Full name: Moussa Kalilou Djitté
- Date of birth: 4 October 1999 (age 27)
- Place of birth: Kaolack, Senegal
- Height: 1.80 m (5 ft 11 in)
- Position: Forward

Team information
- Current team: Grenoble
- Number: 2

Youth career
- 2016–2018: NGB

Senior career*
Years	Team	Apps	(Gls)
2018–2019	Sion	23	(3)
2019–2021	Grenoble	62	(15)
2021–2024	Austin FC	30	(5)
2023	→ Ajaccio (loan)	6	(0)
2023–2024	→ Bandırmaspor (loan)	31	(13)
2024–2025	Gençlerbirliği	18	(4)
2025	Al-Faisaly	13	(1)
2025–	Grenoble	19	(1)

International career^{‡}
2017	Senegal U20	5	(2)
2018	Senegal U23	1	(1)
- * Club domestic league appearances and goals as of 11 May 2026 ‡ National team caps and goals as of 20 February 2019

Moussa Kalilou Djitté (born 4 October 1999) is a Senegalese professional footballer who plays as a forward for French Ligue 2 club Grenoble.

== Professional career ==
On 21 June 2018, Djitté transferred from the Senegalese club ASC Niarry Tally to FC Sion in Switzerland. He made his professional debut in a 2–1 Swiss Super League loss to FC Lugano on 22 July 2018.

On 17 June 2019, he signed with Grenoble in the French Ligue 2.

On 30 June 2021, he signed with Austin FC of Major League Soccer under the league's U22 Initiative. On 14 September 2022, Djitte scored the first hat trick in Austin FC history in a 3–0 victory against Real Salt Lake. Austin FC clinched their first ever playoff berth in the win.

On 31 January 2023, Djitté signed on loan with Ligue 1 side Ajaccio for the remainder of the season. On 3 July 2023, it was announced Djitté would join TFF First League side Bandırmaspor on a one-year loan deal. On 2 July 2024, Austin and Djitté mutually agreed to terminate his contract.

On 2 February 2025, Djitté joined Saudi Arabian club Al-Faisaly.

On 3 September 2025, Djitté returned to Grenoble.

== International career ==
Djitté represented the Senegal U20 at the 2017 Jeux de la Francophonie and scored in his side's debut. He also represented Senegal at the 2017 WAFU Cup of Nations.

On 23 March 2018, Djitté debuted for the Senegal U23 in a 1–1 friendly tie with the Morocco U23s, and scored his side's only goal.

== Career statistics ==
=== Club ===
As of 25 May 2024

Appearances and goals by club, season and competition
Club	Season	League			Domestic Cups (Note: Includes appearance(s) in Swiss Cup, Coupe de France, Turkish Cup)		Continental		Other		Total	
Club	Season	Division	Apps	Goals	Apps	Goals	Apps	Goals	Apps	Goals	Apps	Goals
FC Sion	2018–19	Swiss Super League	23	3	2	1	—		—		25	4
Grenoble Foot 38	2019–20	Ligue 2	25	7	1	0	—		2 (Note: Includes appearance(s) in Coupe de la Ligue)	0	28	7
Grenoble Foot 38	2020–21	Ligue 2	37	8	2	0	—		—		39	8
Grenoble Foot 38	Total		62	15	3	0	0	0	2	0	67	15
Austin FC	2021	Major League Soccer	13	1	—		—		—		13	1
Austin FC	2022	Major League Soccer	17	4	0	0	—		3 (Note: Includes Appearance(s) in MLS Cup Playoffs)	1	20	5
Austin FC	2023	Major League Soccer	0	0	0	0	0	0	0	0	0	0
Austin FC	2024	Major League Soccer	0	0	0	0	—		0	0	0	0
Austin FC	Club Total		30	5	0	0	0	0	3	1	33	6
AC Ajaccio (loan)	2022–23	Ligue 1	6	0	0	0	—		—		6	0
Bandırmaspor (loan)	2022–23	TFF First League	31	13	2	0	—		—		33	13
Career Total			152	36	7	1	0	0	5	1	164	38

== Personal life ==
Djitté is the cousin of the Senegalese footballer Souleymane Cissé.
