= Anis Ajroud =

Tunisian association footballer

Personal information
- Date of birth: 30 March 2002 (age 24)
- Place of birth: M'saken, Tunisia
- Height: 1.82 m (6 ft 0 in)
- Position: Winger

Team information
- Current team: Cannet Rocheville

Youth career
- 2014–2018: Nice
- 2018–2019: Cavigal Nice
- 2019–2020: Ajaccio

Senior career*
Years	Team	Apps	(Gls)
2020–2022	Ajaccio II	23	(3)
2022	Ajaccio	1	(0)
2023	Pietà Hotspurs	1	(0)
2023–	Cannet Rocheville	16	(0)

International career^{‡}
2022	Tunisia U23	1	(0)
- * Club domestic league appearances and goals as of 14 December 2024 ‡ National team caps and goals as of 15:54, 4 August 2022 (UTC)

Anis Ajroud (born 30 March 2002) is a Tunisian professional footballer who plays as a winger for French Championnat National 3 club Cannet Rocheville.

== Club career ==
Ajroud began playing football at the youth academy of Nice and after four years moved to Cavigal Nice for the 2018–19 season. He then transferred to the youth academy of Ajaccio in 2019 and was promoted to their reserves in 2020. He made his professional debut with Ajaccio in a 2–0 Ligue 2 loss to Caen on 24 January 2022, coming on as a substitute in the 85th minute.

== International career ==
Ajroud debuted for the Tunisia U23s for a set of friendlies in May 2022.
