= Bevic Moussiti-Oko =

Congolese footballer (born 1995)

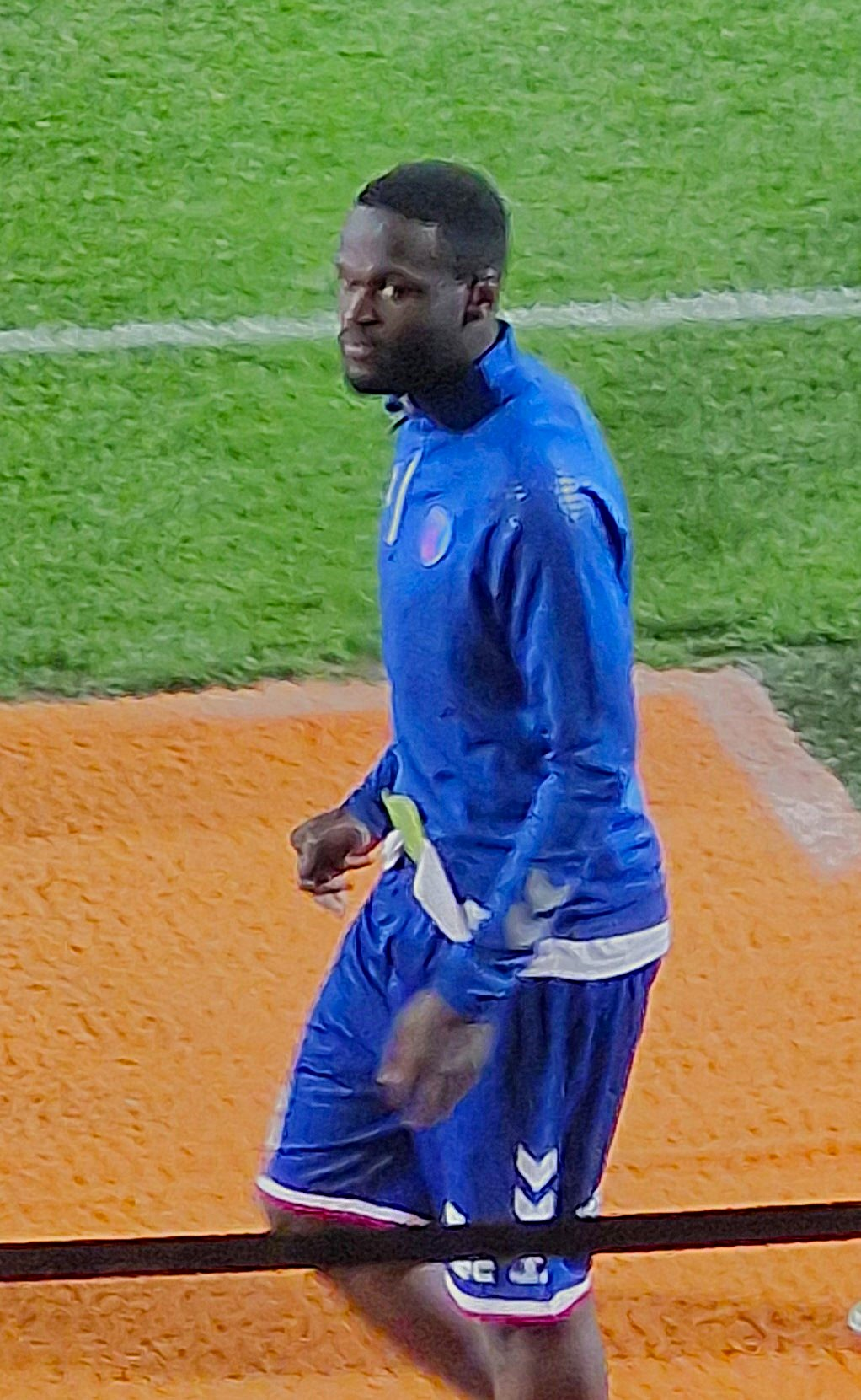
- Moussiti-Oko in 2024

Personal information
- Date of birth: 28 January 1995 (age 31)
- Place of birth: Brazzaville, Congo
- Height: 1.84 m (6 ft 0 in)
- Position: Forward

Team information
- Current team: FC Gifu
- Number: 11

Youth career
- Lesquin

Senior career*
Years	Team	Apps	(Gls)
2015–2017	Dunkerque	43	(10)
2017–2019	Le Havre B	24	(6)
2017–2019	Le Havre	12	(0)
2019	→ Quevilly-Rouen (loan)	16	(8)
2019–2020	Le Mans	24	(3)
2020–2023	Ajaccio	64	(11)
2023	Ankaragücü	8	(0)
2023–2024	Boluspor	9	(1)
2024	Concarneau	5	(2)
2024–2025	Martigues	26	(0)
2025–	FC Gifu	8	(1)

International career^{‡}
2015	Congo U20	2	(0)
2019–	Congo	2	(0)
- * Club domestic league appearances and goals as of 13 May 2025 ‡ National team caps and goals as of 00:27, 30 May 2022 (UTC)

Bevic Moussiti-Oko (born 28 January 1995) is a Congolese professional footballer who plays as a forward for J3 League club FC Gifu and the Congo national team.

== Club career ==
Moussiti-Oko had a successful spell with Dunkerque in the Championnat National, and transferred to Le Havre of Ligue 2 in 2017. He made his professional debut for Le Havre in a 1–1 Ligue 2 tie with Orléans on 8 September 2017.

In January 2019, Moussiti-Oko moved on loan to Quevilly-Rouen. He left Le Havre for Le Mans, newly promoted to Ligue 2, in June 2019.

On 1 February 2023, Moussiti-Oko signed a year-and-a-half-long contract with Ankaragücü in Turkey.

On 18 January 2024, Moussiti-Oko joined Concarneau.

== International career ==
In 2015, Moussiti-Oko made his debut for Congo's under-20 at the 2015 African U-20 Championship, making 2 appearances.

Moussiti-Oko was called up the Congo senior team in May 2017 for a 2018 African Nations Championship qualification match against the DR Congo. He made his senior debut on 10 October 2019 as a second-half substitute in a friendly against Thailand that ended as a 1–1 draw.
