= Mamadou Diallo (footballer, born 1994) =

Guinean professional footballer

Personal information
- Full name: Mamadou Lamarana Diallo
- Date of birth: 19 September 1994 (age 32)
- Place of birth: Yeumbeul, Dakar, Senegal
- Height: 1.77 m (5 ft 10 in)
- Position: Forward

Team information
- Current team: Panargiakos
- Number: 19

Youth career
- –2013: Dakar Sacré-Cœur

Senior career*
Years	Team	Apps	(Gls)
2013–2015	Sochaux II	61	(11)
2013–2014	Sochaux	2	(0)
2015–2017	Arras	40	(12)
2017–2018	Croix	25	(6)
2018–2020	Créteil	44	(13)
2018	Créteil II	1	(0)
2020–2022	Grenoble	57	(6)
2023	Vilafranquense	2	(0)
2024	Anadia	4	(1)
2024–	Panargiakos	18	(2)

International career^{‡}
2022–	Guinea	1	(0)
- * Club domestic league appearances and goals as of 15 June 2025 ‡ National team caps and goals as of 15:29, 11 January 2022 (UTC)

Mamadou Lamarana Diallo (born 19 September 1994) is a professional footballer who plays as a forward for Greek club Panargiakos in the Super League Greece 2. Born in Senegal, he plays for the Guinea national team.

== Professional career ==
Diallo was a youth product of Dakar Sacré-Cœur in Senegal, before being spotted and recruited by Sochaux. Diallo made his professional debut with Sochaux in a 1-1 Ligue 1 tie with SC Bastia on 23 November 2013. After his stint at Sochaux, Diallo spent his early career in the amateur divisions of French football. On 7 May 2020, Diallo signed for Grenoble.

== International career ==
Born in Senegal, Diallo holds Guinean nationality by descent. On 27 December 2021, the Guinean Football Federation announced that Diallo had decided to represent their national team and was included in Guinea's extended 2021 Africa Cup of Nations squad. He debuted with Guinea in a 1–0 2021 Africa Cup of Nations win over Malawi on 10 January 2022.
