= Baptiste Guillaume =

Belgian footballer (born 1995)

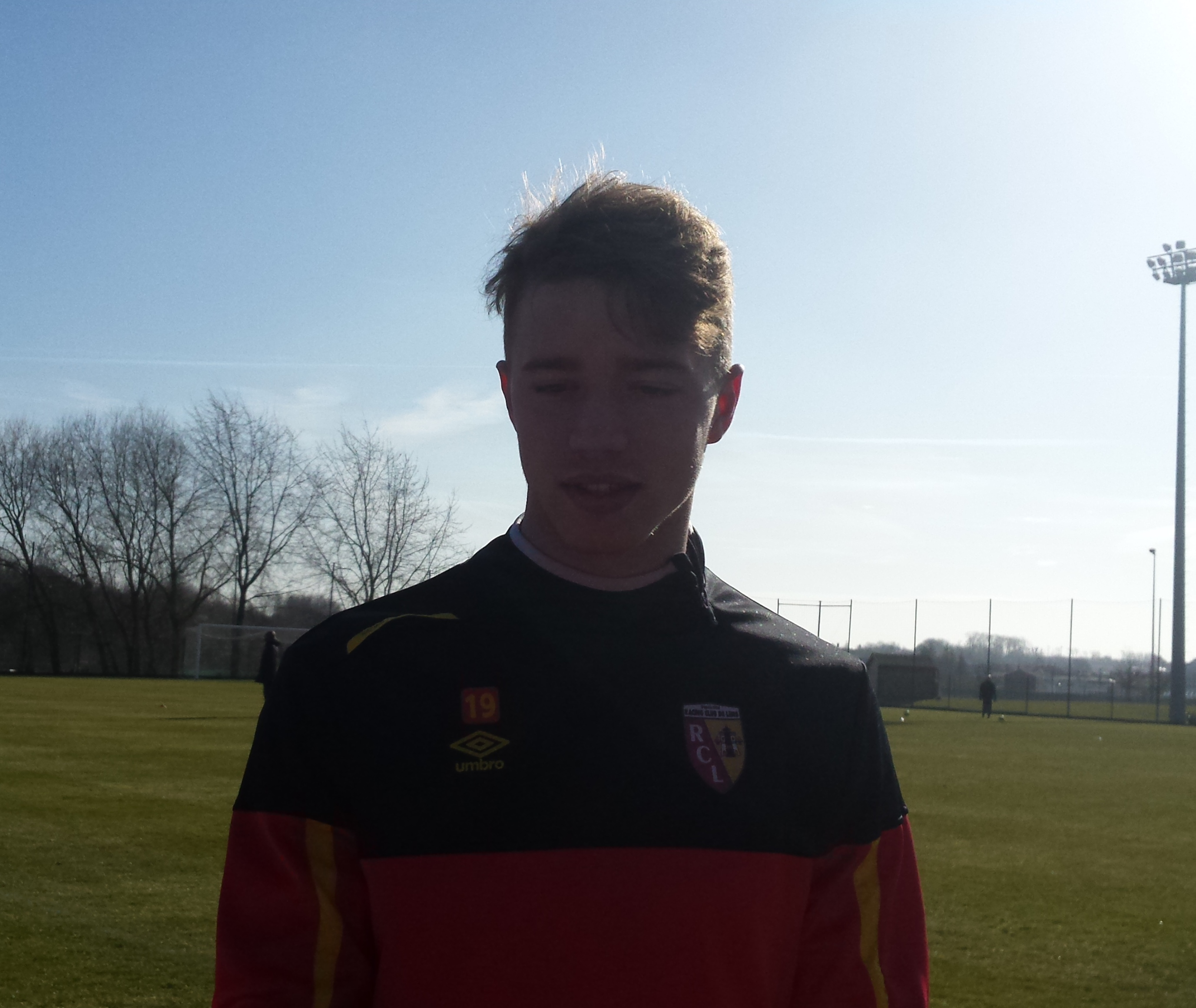

Personal information
- Date of birth: 16 June 1995 (age 31)
- Place of birth: Brussels, Belgium
- Height: 1.89 m (6 ft 2 in)
- Position: Forward

Team information
- Current team: Bordeaux

Youth career
- Lens

Senior career*
Years	Team	Apps	(Gls)
2013–2014	Lens B	21	(3)
2013–2015	Lens	33	(3)
2015–2016	Lille B	16	(12)
2015–2017	Lille	10	(0)
2016–2017	→ Strasbourg (loan)	31	(9)
2017–2020	Angers	16	(1)
2018–2019	→ Nîmes (loan)	24	(2)
2019–2020	→ Valenciennes (loan)	21	(2)
2020–2022	Valenciennes	54	(17)
2022–2024	Guingamp	70	(14)
2024–2025	Almere City	18	(1)
2025–2026	Le Mans	6	(0)
2026–	Bordeaux	0	(0)

International career
2014	Belgium U19	4	(1)
2015–2016	Belgium U21	4	(0)
- * Club domestic league appearances and goals as of 11 May 2026

Baptiste Guillaume (born 16 June 1995) is a Belgian professional footballer who plays as a forward for Régional 1 club Bordeaux.

== Career ==
A youth exponent of Lens, Guillaume made his debut in the Ligue 2 during the 2012–2013 season. He scored his first professional goal against Nîmes Olympique. He made his first start for the club on 24 October 2014, in a 2–0 victory against Toulouse.

In June 2022, Guillaume signed a two-year deal with Guingamp.

On 21 June 2024, Guillaume joined Almere City in the Netherlands on a two-year contract, with an optional third year.

On 4 August 2025, Guillaume moved to Le Mans in French Ligue 2.

In October 2026, Guillaume joined Régional 1 club Bordeaux.
