= Elhadj Dabo =

Senegalese footballer (born 1995)

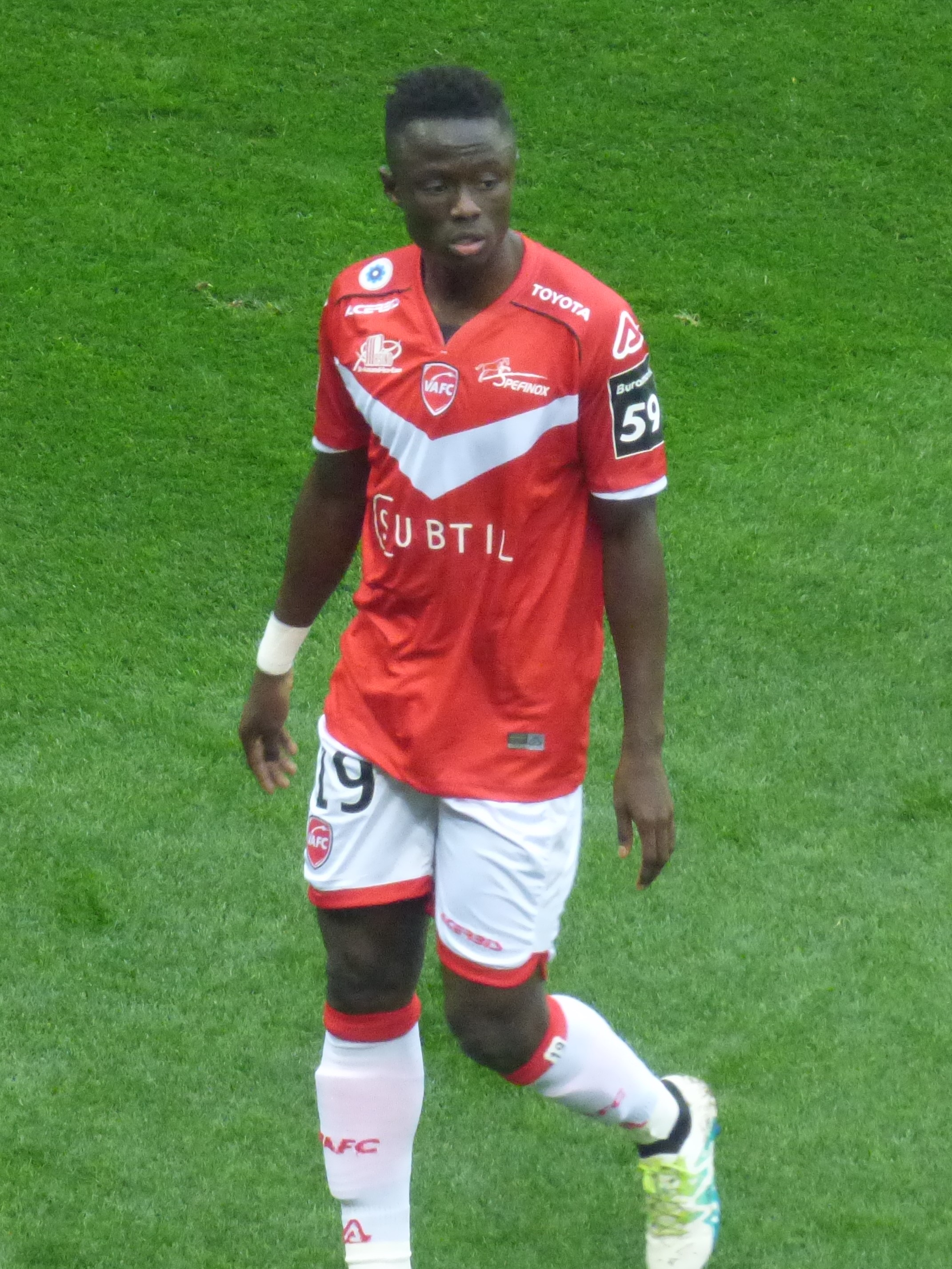
- Dabo in 2018

Personal information
- Date of birth: 20 November 1995 (age 30)
- Place of birth: Thiès, Senegal
- Height: 1.80 m (5 ft 11 in)
- Position: Midfielder

Youth career
- 2013–2014: CNEPS Excellence

Senior career*
Years	Team	Apps	(Gls)
2014–2015	Sedan	12	(0)
2015–2020	Valenciennes B	22	(0)
2016–2021	Valenciennes	30	(2)
2021–2022	Créteil	22	(1)
2022–2025	Boulogne	72	(4)

International career
2014	Senegal U23	1	(0)
- * Club domestic league appearances and goals as of 18 May 2025

Elhadj Dabo (born 20 November 1995) is a Senegalese professional footballer who plays as a midfielder.

== Club career ==
On 20 July 2021, he joined French third-tier club Créteil.

== International career ==
Dabo is a former youth international for Senegal.
