= Mickaël Barreto =

French footballer (born 1991)

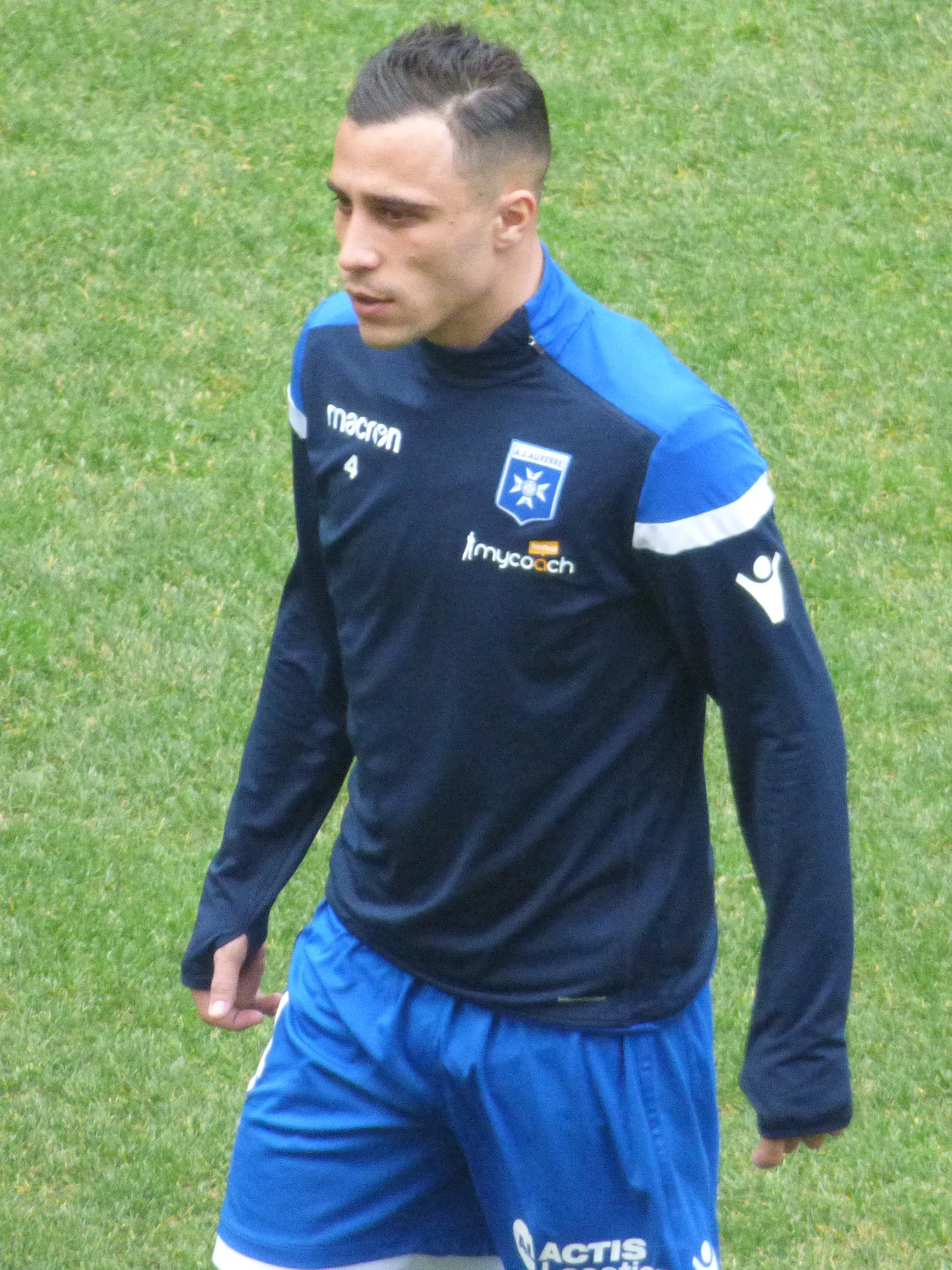
- Barreto in 2019

Personal information
- Date of birth: 18 January 1991 (age 35)
- Place of birth: Paris, France
- Height: 1.75 m (5 ft 9 in)
- Position: Attacking midfielder

Team information
- Current team: Dijon
- Number: 4

Youth career
- Troyes

Senior career*
Years	Team	Apps	(Gls)
2009–2015	Troyes	14	(0)
2012–2013	→ Fréjus Saint-Raphaël (loan)	14	(1)
2013–2014	→ Cannes (loan)	16	(0)
2013–2015	Troyes B	20	(8)
2014–2015	→ Avranches (loan)	27	(7)
2015–2017	Orléans	67	(9)
2017–2020	Auxerre	76	(3)
2018–2019	Auxerre B	8	(2)
2020–2025	Ajaccio	119	(11)
2022–2025	Ajaccio B	3	(2)
2025–	Dijon	17	(4)
2025–	Dijon B	1	(0)
- * Club domestic league appearances and goals as of 22 June 2026

Mickaël Barreto (born 18 January 1991) is a French professional footballer who plays as an attacking midfielder for Ligue 2 club Dijon.

== Career ==
On 15 August 2025, Barreto signed for Dijon on a two-year contract.
