= Patryk Paryzek =

Polish footballer (born 2006)

Personal information
- Date of birth: 3 February 2006 (age 20)
- Place of birth: Poznań, Poland
- Height: 1.92 m (6 ft 4 in)
- Position: Forward

Team information
- Current team: Pogoń Szczecin
- Number: 42

Youth career
- 2012–2014: AP Reissa Poznań
- 2014–2020: Lech Poznań
- 2020–2022: AP Reissa Poznań
- 2022–2024: Pogoń Szczecin

Senior career*
Years	Team	Apps	(Gls)
2024–	Pogoń Szczecin	33	(2)
2024–	Pogoń Szczecin II	12	(2)
2026	→ Górnik Łęczna (loan)	14	(0)

International career^{‡}
2023–2024	Poland U18	3	(0)
2024	Poland U19	5	(2)
- * Club domestic league appearances and goals as of 16:09, 26 May 2026 (UTC) ‡ National team caps and goals as of 13:25, 11 January 2025 (UTC)

Patryk Paryzek (born 3 February 2006) is a Polish professional footballer who plays as a forward for Ekstraklasa club Pogoń Szczecin.

== Career ==
=== Youth career ===
Paryzek started his youth career with AP Reissa Poznań. He joined Lech Poznań's academy in 2014, and was released from their youth system in 2020. After that, he returned to AP Reissa. In July 2022, he moved to Pogoń Szczecin's academy, where he stayed for the rest of his youth career.

=== Pogoń Szczecin ===
On 30 November 2023, during the 2023–24 season, Paryzek was registered to play in Ekstraklasa, and was assigned squad number 51. He made his debut there in the next year, on 16 February 2024, during a 0–4 away victory over Radomiak Radom. Nine minutes after he came off the bench as a substitute of Efthýmis Kouloúris, he scored his first league goal. Paryzek also played for Pogoń Szczecin II, where he made his debut in a 2–0 victory over Vineta Wolin on 13 April 2024.

On 20 October 2024, during a 0–1 away loss over Raków Częstochowa, he sustained an ankle injury and was carried off the pitch on a stretcher. He returned to training on 11 November, and played his first match after the injury twelve days later.

==== Loan to Górnik Łęczna ====
On 5 February 2026, Paryzek joined I liga club Górnik Łęczna on loan for the rest of the season.

== International career ==
He played for the Poland under-18 and under-19 national teams, making his debut for the latter in a 0–6 away victory over Malta on 5 September 2024.

== Style of play ==
He is a centre-forward. His ex-trainer, Robert Skok, praised him for the physical strength and dribbling skills.

== Career statistics ==
As of match played 24 May 2026

Appearances and goals by club, season and competition
Club	Season	League			Polish Cup		Europe		Other		Total	
Club	Season	Division	Apps	Goals	Apps	Goals	Apps	Goals	Apps	Goals	Apps	Goals
Pogoń Szczecin	2023–24	Ekstraklasa	6	1	0	0	—		—		6	1
Pogoń Szczecin	2024–25	Ekstraklasa	23	1	4	1	—		—		27	2
Pogoń Szczecin	2025–26	Ekstraklasa	4	0	1	0	—		—		5	0
Pogoń Szczecin	Total		33	2	5	1	—		—		38	3
Pogoń Szczecin II	2023–24	III liga, gr. II	1	0	0	0	—		—		1	0
Pogoń Szczecin II	2024–25	III liga, gr. II	6	1	—		—		—		6	1
Pogoń Szczecin II	2025–26	III liga, gr. II	5	1	—		—		—		5	1
Pogoń Szczecin II	Total		12	2	0	0	—		—		12	2
Górnik Łęczna (loan)	2025–26	I liga	14	0	—		—		—		14	0
Career total			59	4	5	1	0	0	0	0	64	5
