= 2019–20 Toulouse FC season =

Toulouse
2019–20 season
- President: Olivier Sadran
- Head coach: Alain Casanova (until 10 October); Antoine Kombouaré (from 14 October to 5 January); Denis Zanko (from 6 January)
- Stadium: Stadium de Toulouse
- Ligue 1: 20th (relegated)
- Coupe de France: Round of 64
- Coupe de la Ligue: Round of 16
- Top goalscorer: League: Efthimis Koulouris (4); All: Max Gradel; Efthimis Koulouris; Yaya Sanogo (4 each)
- Highest home attendance: 23,002 (vs Marseille, 24 November 2019)
- Lowest home attendance: 10,177 (vs Angers, 25 September 2019)
- Average home league attendance: 14,647
- Biggest win: Toulouse 2–0 Amiens
- Biggest defeat: Paris Saint-Germain 4–0 Toulouse
Home colours	Away colours

The 2019–20 season was Toulouse Football Club's 49th season in existence and the club's 17th consecutive season in the top flight of French football. In addition to the domestic league, Toulouse participated in this season's editions of the Coupe de France, and the Coupe de la Ligue. The season covered the period from 1 July 2019 to 30 June 2020.

Toulouse underwent a disastrous campaign in the league, accumulating only one point in their last 18 matches. As a result, the team was relegated to Ligue 2 for the first time since 2003.

== Players ==
=== Squad ===
As of 21 January 2020.

Note: Flags indicate national team as defined under FIFA eligibility rules; some limited exceptions apply. Players may hold more than one non-FIFA nationality.

No.	Pos.	Nation	Player
1	GK	URU	Mauro Goicoechea
2	DF	FRA	Kelvin Amian
3	DF	JPN	Gen Shoji
4	DF	NOR	Ruben Gabrielsen
5	DF	FRA	Steven Moreira
7	FW	CIV	Max Gradel (captain)
9	FW	FRA	Yaya Sanogo
10	FW	BEL	Aaron Leya Iseka
11	MF	FRA	Quentin Boisgard
12	DF	GUI	Issiaga Sylla
13	DF	FRA	Mathieu Gonçalves
14	MF	TOG	Mathieu Dossevi (vice-captain)
15	DF	FRA	Nicolas Isimat-Mirin (on loan from Beşiktaş)
17	MF	CIV	Ibrahim Sangaré
18	DF	URU	Agustín Rogel

No.	Pos.	Nation	Player
19	DF	FRA	Bafodé Diakité
20	FW	GRE	Efthymis Koulouris
21	MF	FRA	William Vainqueur (on loan from Antalyaspor)
22	FW	CMR	Stéphane Zobo
23	DF	FRA	Moussa Diarra
25	FW	FRA	Wesley Saïd
26	MF	FRA	Kalidou Sidibé
27	MF	FRA	Jean-Victor Makengo (on loan from Nice)
29	MF	FRA	Nathan Ngoumou
30	GK	FRA	Baptiste Reynet
31	MF	FRA	Amine Adli
32	FW	FRA	Adil Taoui
33	DF	FRA	Anthony Rouault
34	MF	FRA	Kouadio Koné
40	GK	CRO	Lovre Kalinić (on loan from Aston Villa)

=== Out on loan ===
Note: Flags indicate national team as defined under FIFA eligibility rules; some limited exceptions apply. Players may hold more than one non-FIFA nationality.

No.	Pos.	Nation	Player
—	MF	ENG	John Bostock (on loan at Nottingham Forest)
—	FW	COD	Ndombe Mubele (on loan at Astana)
—	FW	FRA	Corentin Jean (on loan at Lens)

=== Reserve squad ===
As of 27 August 2019

Note: Flags indicate national team as defined under FIFA eligibility rules; some limited exceptions apply. Players may hold more than one non-FIFA nationality.

No.	Pos.	Nation	Player
—	DF	FRA	Paul Cachart
—	DF	FRA	Paul Fargeas
—	DF	GAM	Moussa Kamara

No.	Pos.	Nation	Player
—	MF	FRA	Sam Sanna
—	MF	GUI	Seiti Touré
—	FW	MAR	Driss Khalid

== Pre-season and friendlies ==
Win Draw Loss

9 July 2019 Friendly	Béziers (France)	0–0	(France) Toulouse	Béziers, France
19:00 CEST (UTC+2)		Report		Stadium: Stade de Sauclières; Attendance: 850; Referee: Pierre Gaillouste

13 July 2019 Friendly	Toulouse (France)	1–0	(France) Ajaccio	L'Union, France
11:00 CEST (UTC+2)	Bostock 50'	Report	Avinel (yellow card) 28'; El Idrissy (yellow card) 41'	Stadium: Stade Georges Beyney; Attendance: 850; Referee: Olivier Thual

19 July 2019 Friendly	Strasbourg (France)	3–1	(France) Toulouse	Sarre-Union, France
18:30 CEST (UTC+2)	Da Costa 27'; Zohi 77'; Simakan 90'	Report	Boisgard 61'	Stadium: Stade Omnisports

24 July 2019 Friendly	Toulouse (France)	3–2	(Qatar) Al-Arabi	Palamós, Spain
20:00 CEST (UTC+2)	Makengo 53'; Leya Iseka 58'; Adli 71'	Report	Harbaoui 12', 44'	Stadium: Estadi Palamós Costa Brava

3 August 2019 Friendly	Norwich City (England)	1–0	(France) Toulouse	Norwich, England
16:00 BST (UTC+1)	McLean 39'	Report		Stadium: Carrow Road; Attendance: 12,650; Referee: Kevin Friend (England)

5 September 2019 Friendly	Toulouse (France)	1–2	(Spain) Athletic Bilbao	Bayonne, France
19:00 CEST (UTC+2)	Leya Iseka 9'	Report	Aduriz 31'; Gómez 89' (pen.)	Stadium: Stade Didier Deschamps; Referee: Olivier Thual

10 October 2019 Friendly	Toulouse (France)	2–0	(Spain) Eibar	Pau, France
19:00 CEST (UTC+2)	Leya Iseka 12'; Isimat-Mirin 25'	Report		Stadium: Stade du Hameau; Referee: Johan Hamel

== Competitions ==
=== Overview ===
Competition	First match	Last match	Starting round	Final position	Record							
Competition	First match	Last match	Starting round	Final position	Pld	W	D	L	GF	GA	GD	Win %
Ligue 1	10 August 2019	7 March 2020	Matchday 1	20th	28	3	4	21	22	58	−36	10.71
Coupe de France	4 January 2020		Round of 64	Round of 64	1	0	0	1	0	1	−1	0.00
Coupe de la Ligue	30 October 2019	18 December 2019	Round of 32	Round of 16	2	1	0	1	3	5	−2	50.00
Total					31	4	4	23	25	64	−39	12.90

Source: Soccerway

=== Ligue 1 ===
==== League table ====
Pos	Team	Pld	W	D	L	GF	GA	GD	Pts	PPG	Qualification or relegation
16	Dijon	28	7	9	12	27	37	−10	30	1.07	
17	Saint-Étienne	28	8	6	14	29	45	−16	30	1.07	
18	Nîmes (Note: Originally, the 18th-placed Ligue 1 team would play in promotion-relegation play-offs at the end of the season with a team from Ligue 2 to decide whether they would remain in Ligue 1 for the 2020–21 season, but the play-offs were cancelled and the 18th-placed team remained in Ligue 1.)	28	7	6	15	29	44	−15	27	0.96	
19	Amiens (R)	28	4	11	13	31	50	−19	23	0.82	Relegation to Ligue 2
20	Toulouse (R)	28	3	4	21	22	58	−36	13	0.46	Relegation to Ligue 2

Source: Ligue 1
Rules for classification: 1) Points per game; 2) Head-to-head points; 3) Head-to-head goal difference; 4) Goal difference; 5) Goals scored; 6) Fairplay ranking.
(R) Relegated

==== Results summary ====
Overall								Home						Away					
Pld	W	D	L	GF	GA	GD	Pts	W	D	L	GF	GA	GD	W	D	L	GF	GA	GD
28	3	4	21	22	58	−36	13	3	0	10	11	24	−13	0	4	11	11	34	−23

Source: Ligue 1

==== Results by round ====
Round	1	2	3	4	5	6	7	8	9	10	11	12	13	14	15	16	17	18	19	20	21	22	23	24	25	26	27	28	29	30	31	32	33	34	35	36	37	38
Ground	A	H	A	H	A	A	H	A	H	H	A	H	A	H	A	H	A	H	A	H	A	A	H	A	H	A	H	A	H	A	H	A	H	A	H	H	A	H
Result	D	W	L	W	D	L	L	D	L	W	L	L	L	L	L	L	L	L	L	L	L	D	L	L	L	L	L	L	C	C	C	C	C	C	C	C	C	C
Position	9	7	14	9	10	13	14	14	18	15	17	18	19	19	20	20	19	19	20	20	20	20	20	20	20	20	20	20	20	20	20	20	20	20	20	20	20	20

Source: Ligue 1
A = Away; H = Home; W = Win; D = Draw; L = Loss; C = Cancelled

==== Matches ====
The Ligue 1 schedule was announced on 14 June 2019. The Ligue 1 matches were suspended by the LFP on 13 March 2020 due to COVID-19 until further notices. On 28 April 2020, it was announced that Ligue 1 and Ligue 2 campaigns would not resume, after the country banned all sporting events until September. On 30 April, The LFP ended officially the 2019–20 season.

10 August 2019 1	Brest	1–1	Toulouse	Brest
20:00 CEST (UTC+2)	Autret 25'	Report	Koulouris 89'	Stadium: Stade Francis-Le Blé; Attendance: 14,236; Referee: Olivier Thual

17 August 2019 2	Toulouse	1–0	Dijon	Toulouse
20:00 CEST (UTC+2)	Vainqueur (yellow card) 29'; Makengo 54'; Moreira (yellow card) 59'	Report		Stadium: Stadium de Toulouse; Attendance: 10,583; Referee: Ruddy Buquet

25 August 2019 3	Paris Saint-Germain	4–0	Toulouse	Paris
21:00 CEST (UTC+2)	Choupo-Moting 50', 75'; Gonçalves 55' (o.g.); Marquinhos 83'	Report	Sangaré (yellow card) 56'	Stadium: Parc des Princes; Attendance: 47,325; Referee: Jérôme Brisard

31 August 2019 4	Toulouse	2–0	Amiens	Toulouse
20:00 CEST (UTC+2)	Makengo 50'; Koulouris 59'	Report	Lefort (yellow card) 22'	Stadium: Stadium de Toulouse; Attendance: 10,184; Referee: Florent Batta

15 September 2019 5	Saint-Étienne	2–2	Toulouse	Saint-Étienne
17:00 CEST (UTC+2)	Perrin (yellow card) 37'; Hamouma 45', 57'; Moukoudi (yellow card) 79'; Youssouf (yellow card) 90+1'	Report	Gradel 15' (pen.); Leya Iseka 25'	Stadium: Stade Geoffroy-Guichard; Attendance: 24,240; Referee: Jérémy Stinat

21 September 2019 6	Nîmes	1–0	Toulouse	Nîmes
20:00 CEST (UTC+2)	Philippoteaux 39'; Deaux (yellow card) 43'	Report	Saïd (yellow card) 43'; Reynet (yellow card) 72'; Amian (yellow card) 75'; Diakité (red card) 81'	Stadium: Stade des Costières; Attendance: 12,258; Referee: Karim Abed

25 September 2019 7	Toulouse	0–2	Angers	Toulouse
19:00 CEST (UTC+2)	Gradel (yellow card) 90+3'	Report	Alioui 88', 90+5'	Stadium: Stadium de Toulouse; Attendance: 10,177; Referee: Olivier Thual

28 September 2019 8	Metz	2–2	Toulouse	Metz
21:00 CEST (UTC+2)	Diallo 4'; Delaine (yellow card) 11'; Niane 90+1' (pen.)	Report	Saïd 86'; Gradel (yellow card) 90+5'; Koulouris 90+6'	Stadium: Stade Saint-Symphorien; Attendance: 15,054; Referee: Florent Batta

5 October 2019 9	Toulouse	1–3	Bordeaux	Toulouse
20:00 CEST (UTC+2)	Vainqueur (yellow card) 51'; Sylla (yellow card) 56'; Koulouris 61'; Isimat-Mirin (yellow card) 85'	Report	De Préville 1'; Pablo 19', (yellow card) 82'; Benito (yellow card) 36'; Hwang 53'	Stadium: Stadium de Toulouse; Attendance: 20,084; Referee: Benoît Bastien

19 October 2019 10	Toulouse	2–1	Lille	Toulouse
20:00 CEST (UTC+2)	Saïd (yellow card) 15'; Sanogo (yellow card) 40', (goal) 58'; Gradel 66' (pen.)	Report	Xeka (yellow card) 71'; Luiz Araújo (yellow card) 73'; Pied (yellow card) 81'; Fonte (yellow card) 90', (goal) 90+3'	Stadium: Stadium de Toulouse; Attendance: 12,277; Referee: Stéphanie Frappart

27 October 2019 11	Rennes	3–2	Toulouse	Rennes
15:00 CET (UTC+1)	Niang 3'; Hunou 6'; Bourigeaud (yellow card) 65'; Gboho 90+2'	Report	Moreira (yellow card) 36'; Dossevi 41'; Amian (yellow card) 79'; Gradel 84'	Stadium: Roazhon Park; Attendance: 22,918; Referee: Antony Gautier

2 November 2019 12	Toulouse	2–3	Lyon	Toulouse
20:00 CET (UTC+1)	Sanogo 15'; Gonçalves (yellow card) 46'; Lopes 59' (o.g.); Koné (yellow card) 82'; Vainqueur (yellow card) 84'	Report	Depay 26', 90+5'; Dembélé 67'	Stadium: Stadium de Toulouse; Attendance: 16,225; Referee: Karim Abed

10 November 2019 13	Montpellier	3–0	Toulouse	Montpellier
17:00 CET (UTC+1)	Chotard (yellow card) 34'; Laborde 43'; Le Tallec 59'; Savanier 75'; Sambia (yellow card) 87'	Report	Sangaré (yellow card) 39'; Vainqueur (yellow card) 41'	Stadium: Stade de la Mosson; Attendance: 12,734; Referee: Thomas Leonard

24 November 2019 14	Toulouse	0–2	Marseille	Toulouse
21:00 CET (UTC+1)	Sangaré (yellow card) 32'; Moreira (red card) 42'; Isimat-Mirin (yellow card) 63'; Amian (yellow card) 86'	Report	Strootman (yellow card) 70'; Benedetto 76'; Radonjić 79', (yellow card) 80'; Kamara (yellow card) 82'	Stadium: Stadium de Toulouse; Attendance: 23,002; Referee: François Letexier

1 December 2019 15	Nantes	2–1	Toulouse	Nantes
15:00 CET (UTC+1)	Bamba (yellow card) 40'; Touré 43' (pen.); Blas 54'	Report	Koné (yellow card) 8' (yellow-red card) 23'; Isimat-Mirin (yellow card) 48'; Leya Iseka 90+7' (pen.)	Stadium: Stade de la Beaujoire; Attendance: 13,751; Referee: Florent Batta

4 December 2019 16	Toulouse	1–2	Monaco	Toulouse
19:00 CET (UTC+1)	Sanogo 40' (pen.)	Report	Ben Yedder 5' (pen.); Glik (yellow card) 39'; Martins 84'	Stadium: Stadium de Toulouse; Attendance: 13,030; Referee: Willy Delajod

7 December 2019 17	Strasbourg	4–2	Toulouse	Strasbourg
20:00 CET (UTC+1)	Koné 7'; Thomasson 27'; Ajorque 48'; Mothiba 76'	Report	Isimat-Mirin 4'; Saïd 50'; Leya Iseka (yellow card) 77'	Stadium: Stade de la Meinau; Attendance: 23,634; Referee: Johan Hamel

14 December 2019 18	Toulouse	0–1	Reims	Toulouse
20:00 CET (UTC+1)		Report	Oudin 9'; Romao (yellow card) 29'; Chavalerin (yellow card) 79'	Stadium: Stadium de Toulouse; Attendance: 12,577; Referee: Clément Turpin

21 December 2019 19	Nice	3–0	Toulouse	Nice
20:45 CET (UTC+1)	Sarr 16'; Boudaoui 19', (yellow card) 25'; Lees-Melou 40'	Report	Koné (yellow card) 7'; Sangaré (yellow card) 37'; Isimat-Mirin (yellow card) 53'; Adli (yellow card) 89'	Stadium: Allianz Riviera; Attendance: 17,945; Referee: Stéphanie Frappart

11 January 2020 20	Toulouse	2–5	Brest	Toulouse
20:00 CET (UTC+1)	Diakité 17', 20'; Vainqueur (yellow card) 84'	Report	Court 8'; Charbonnier 72', 77'; Mbock 79'; Cardona 85'	Stadium: Stadium de Toulouse; Attendance: 13,666; Referee: Hakim Ben El Hadj

26 January 2020 21	Lyon	3–0	Toulouse	Décines-Charpieu
15:00 CET (UTC+1)	Cornet 29'; Dembélé 71'; Toko Ekambi 77'	Report	Vainqueur (yellow card) 46'	Stadium: Parc Olympique Lyonnais; Attendance: 42,582; Referee: Antony Gautier

1 February 2020 22	Amiens	0–0	Toulouse	Amiens
20:00 CET (UTC+1)	Monconduit (yellow card) 20'; Dibassy (yellow card) 65'; Guirassy (yellow card) 75'	Report	Sangaré (yellow card) 78'; Koné (yellow card) 90+1'	Stadium: Stade de la Licorne; Attendance: 10,992; Referee: François Letexier

5 February 2020 23	Toulouse	0–1	Strasbourg	Toulouse
19:00 CET (UTC+1)	Boisgard (yellow card) 59'	Report	Waris 76'; Carole (yellow card) 83'; Sissoko (yellow card) 90+2'	Stadium: Stadium de Toulouse; Attendance: 16,596; Referee: Karim Abed

8 February 2020 24	Marseille	1–0	Toulouse	Marseille
17:30 CET (UTC+1)	Álvaro (yellow card) 15'; Payet 51'	Report	Makengo (yellow card) 61'; Sylla (yellow card) 71'	Stadium: Stade Vélodrome; Attendance: 53,995; Referee: Stéphanie Frappart

15 February 2020 25	Toulouse	0–2	Nice	Toulouse
20:00 CET (UTC+1)	Gabrielsen (red card) 27'; Gradel (yellow card) 58'; Moreira (red card) 77'; Sangaré (yellow card) 84'	Report	Lees-Melou 12'; Hérelle 90+6'	Stadium: Stadium de Toulouse; Attendance: 12,903; Referee: Jérôme Miguelgorry

22 February 2020 26	Lille	3–0	Toulouse	Villeneuve-d'Ascq
20:00 CET (UTC+1)	Rémy 2', 39'; Osimhen (yellow card) 40'; Sanches 72'	Report	Leya Iseka (yellow card) 24'; Sangaré (yellow card) 89'; Vainqueur (yellow card) 90+1'	Stadium: Stade Pierre-Mauroy; Attendance: 37,034; Referee: Thomas Léonard

29 February 2020 27	Toulouse	0–2	Rennes	Toulouse
20:00 CET (UTC+1)	Sangaré (yellow card) 23'; Vainqueur (yellow card) 33'; Diakité (yellow card) 45'	Report	Bourigeaud 3'; Traoré (yellow card) 29'; Maouassa 83'	Stadium: Stadium de Toulouse; Attendance: 13,301; Referee: Jérémy Stinat

7 March 2020 28	Dijon	2–1	Toulouse	Dijon
20:00 CET (UTC+1)	Baldé (yellow card) 12'; Mendyl 40', (yellow card) 45'; Aguerd 53'	Report	Gradel (yellow card) 12'; Koulouris (yellow card) 17'; Boisgard 41'	Stadium: Stade Gaston Gérard; Attendance: 12,549; Referee: Jérôme Brisard

29	Toulouse	Cancelled	Metz	Toulouse
--:-- CEST (UTC+2)				Stadium: Stadium de Toulouse; Attendance: 0

30	Angers	Cancelled	Toulouse	Angers
--:-- CEST (UTC+2)				Stadium: Stade Raymond Kopa; Attendance: 0

31	Toulouse	Cancelled	Saint-Étienne	Toulouse
--:-- CEST (UTC+2)				Stadium: Stadium de Toulouse; Attendance: 0

32	Reims	Cancelled	Toulouse	Reims
--:-- CEST (UTC+2)				Stadium: Stade Auguste Delaune; Attendance: 0

33	Toulouse	Cancelled	Nantes	Toulouse
--:-- CEST (UTC+2)				Stadium: Stadium de Toulouse

34	Bordeaux	Cancelled	Toulouse	Bordeaux
--:-- CEST (UTC+2)				Stadium: Matmut Atlantique

35	Toulouse	Cancelled	Nîmes	Toulouse
--:-- CEST (UTC+2)				Stadium: Stadium de Toulouse

36	Toulouse	Cancelled	Paris Saint-Germain	Toulouse
--:-- CEST (UTC+2)				Stadium: Stadium de Toulouse

37	Monaco	Cancelled	Toulouse	Monaco
--:-- CEST (UTC+2)				Stadium: Stade Louis II

38	Toulouse	Cancelled	Montpellier	Toulouse
--:-- CEST (UTC+2)				Stadium: Stadium de Toulouse

=== Coupe de France ===
4 January 2020 Round of 64	Saint-Pryvé Saint-Hilaire FC	1–0	Toulouse	Saint-Pryvé-Saint-Mesmin
18:00 CET (UTC+1)	Antoine 90+6'	Report		Stadium: Stade du Grand Clos; Attendance: 1,620; Referee: Antony Gautier

=== Coupe de la Ligue ===
30 October 2019 Round of 32	Niort	1–2	Toulouse	Niort
21:05 CET (UTC+1)	Sissoko 11' (pen.)	Report	Gradel 52'; Sanogo 81'	Stadium: Stade René Gaillard; Attendance: 3,443; Referee: Florent Batta

18 December 2019 Round of 16	Lyon	4–1	Toulouse	Décines-Charpieu
18:45 CET (UTC+1)	Traoré 2', 57', (yellow card) 53'; Jean Lucas 17', (yellow card) 24'; Terrier 90+1'	Report	Koné 48'	Stadium: Parc Olympique Lyonnais; Attendance: 21,902; Referee: Thomas Leonard

== Statistics ==
=== Goalscorers ===
As of matches played until 5 February 2020

Rank	No.	Pos.	Player	Ligue 1	Coupe de France	Coupe de la Ligue	Total
1	7	FW	(Ivory Coast) Max Gradel	3	0	1	4
1	20	FW	(Greece) Efthimis Koulouris	4	0	0	4
1	9	FW	(France) Yaya Sanogo	3	0	1	4
4	19	DF	(France) Bafodé Diakité	2	0	0	2
4	10	FW	(Belgium) Aaron Leya Iseka	2	0	0	2
4	27	MF	(France) Jean-Victor Makengo	2	0	0	2
4	25	FW	(France) Wesley Saïd	2	0	0	2
8	14	MF	(Togo) Mathieu Dossevi	1	0	0	1
8	15	DF	(France) Nicolas Isimat-Mirin	1	0	0	1
8	34	MF	(France) Kouadio Koné	0	0	1	1
Own goals				1	0	0	1
TOTAL				21	0	3	24
