= Janis Antiste =

Martiniquais footballer (born 2002)

Janïs Antiste
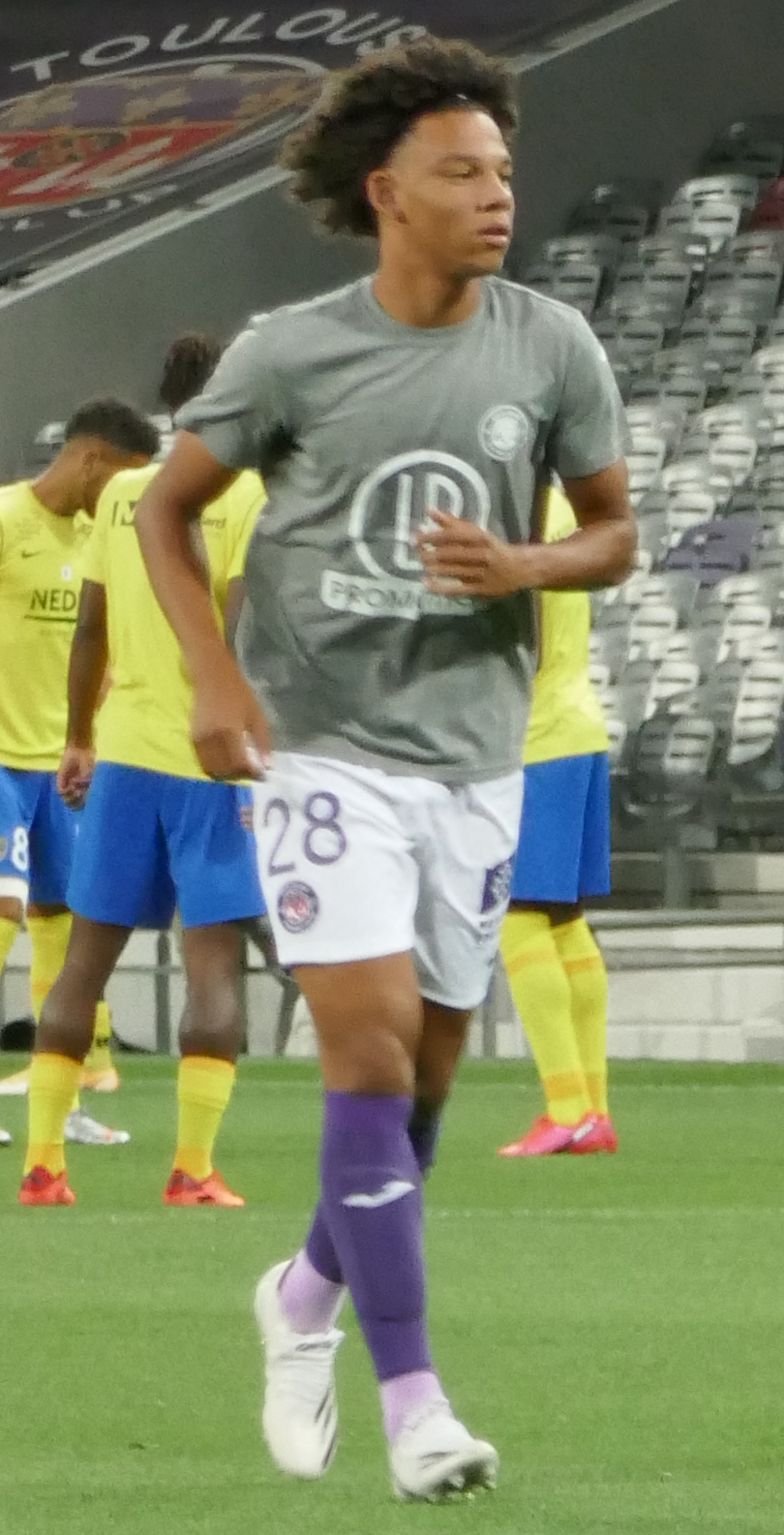
- Antiste in 2020

Personal information
- Full name: Janïs Saël Antiste
- Date of birth: 18 August 2002 (age 24)
- Place of birth: Toulouse, France
- Height: 1.83 m (6 ft 0 in)
- Position: Forward

Team information
- Current team: Górnik Zabrze (on loan from Sassuolo)
- Number: 9

Youth career
- 2008–2010: AS Portet
- 2010–2019: Toulouse

Senior career*
Years	Team	Apps	(Gls)
2019–2020	Toulouse II	5	(1)
2020–2021	Toulouse	34	(6)
2021–2023	Spezia	18	(1)
2022–2023	→ Sassuolo (loan)	2	(1)
2023–	Sassuolo	4	(1)
2023	→ Amiens (loan)	14	(1)
2023–2024	→ Reggiana (loan)	28	(4)
2025	→ 1. FC Nürnberg (loan)	12	(5)
2025–2026	→ Rapid Wien (loan)	26	(3)
2026–	→ Górnik Zabrze (loan)	8	(1)

International career^{‡}
2017–2018	France U16	7	(1)
2018	France U17	2	(0)
2021	France U20	3	(1)
2021	France U21	1	(0)
2026–	Martinique	8	(3)
- * Club domestic league appearances and goals as of 14:06, 9 November 2026 (UTC) ‡ National team caps and goals as of 23:23, 17 November 2026 (UTC)

Janïs Saël Antiste (born 18 August 2002) is a professional footballer who plays as a forward for Ekstraklasa club Górnik Zabrze, on loan from Serie A club Sassuolo. Born in Metropolitan France, he plays for the Martinique national team.

== Club career ==
=== Toulouse ===
On 13 October 2019, Antiste signed his first professional contract with Toulouse. He made his professional debut with the club in a 1–0 Ligue 1 loss to Strasbourg on 5 February 2020.

=== Spezia ===
On 25 August 2021, Antiste signed with Italian Serie A side Spezia Calcio.

=== Sassuolo ===
On 31 August 2022, Antiste joined Sassuolo on loan with an obligation to buy.

==== Loans ====
On 29 January 2023, Antiste was loaned by Sassuolo to Amiens.

On 1 September 2023, Antiste moved on loan to Reggiana in Serie B.

On 3 February 2025, Antiste was loaned by 1. FC Nürnberg in Germany's 2. Bundesliga.

On 17 July 2025, Antiste joined Rapid Wien in Austria on loan.

On 15 August 2026, Antiste moved on a season-long loan to Ekstraklasa club Górnik Zabrze, with an option to buy.

== International career ==
A French international in youth teams, Antiste has seven selections for a goal with the under-16s between 2017 and 2018 and two selections with the under-17s in 2018.

In March 2021, he was called up for the first time to the France U19 team. He was called up to the Martinique national team for a set of friendlies in March 2026.

== Personal life ==
Born in mainland France, Antiste is of Martiniquais descent through his father.

== Career statistics ==
=== Club ===
As of match played 7 November 2026

Appearances and goals by club, season and competition
Club	Season	League			National cup (Note: Includes Coupe de France, Coppa Italia, Austrian Cup, Polish Cup)		Europe		Other		Total	
Club	Season	Division	Apps	Goals	Apps	Goals	Apps	Goals	Apps	Goals	Apps	Goals
Toulouse B	2019–20	National 3	5	1	—		—		—		5	1
Toulouse	2019–20	Ligue 1	1	0	0	0	—		—		1	0
Toulouse	2020–21	Ligue 2	30	6	4	1	—		1 (Note: Appearance(s) in promotion play-off)	0	35	7
Toulouse	2021–22	Ligue 2	3	0	0	0	—		—		3	0
Toulouse	Total		34	6	4	1	—		1	0	39	7
Spezia	2021–22	Serie A	18	1	1	0	—		—		19	1
Sassuolo (loan)	2022–23	Serie A	2	1	0	0	—		—		2	1
Sassuolo	2024–25	Serie B	4	1	2	0	—		—		6	1
Sassuolo	Total		6	2	2	1	—		—		8	2
Amiens (loan)	2022–23	Ligue 2	14	1	0	0	—		—		14	1
Reggiana (loan)	2023–24	Serie B	28	4	1	0	—		—		29	4
1. FC Nürnberg (loan)	2024–25	2. Bundesliga	12	5	—		—		—		12	5
Rapid Wien (loan)	2025–26	Austrian Bundesliga	26	3	3	0	10 (Note: Appearance(s) in UEFA Conference League)	1	—		40	4
Górnik Zabrze (loan)	2026–27	Ekstraklasa	8	1	1	0	2	1	—		11	2
Career total			147	24	10	1	12	2	1	0	170	27

=== International ===
As of match played 16 November 2026

Appearances and goals by national team and year
National team	Year	Apps	Goals
Martinique	2026	8	3
Total		8	3

Scores and results list Martinique's goal tally first, score column indicates score after each Antiste goal.

List of international goals scored by Janis Antiste
No.	Date	Venue	Opponent	Score	Result	Competition
1	26 March 2026	Estadio Cibao, Santiago, Dominican Republic	Cuba	2–1	2–2	2025–26 CONCACAF Series
2	25 September 2026	Estadio Jorge "El Mágico" González, San Salvador, El Salvador	El Salvador	1–3	1–3	2026–27 CONCACAF Nations League A
3	5 October 2026	Stade Pierre-Aliker, Fort-de-France, Martinique	El Salvador	1–1	1–1	2026–27 CONCACAF Nations League A
