= 2020–21 Toulouse FC season =

Toulouse
2020–21 season
- President: Damien Comolli
- Head coach: Patrice Garande
- Stadium: Stadium de Toulouse
- Ligue 2: 3rd
- Coupe de France: Quarter-finals
- Top goalscorer: League: Rhys Healey (15); All: Rhys Healey (16)
Home colours	Away colours
- All statistics correct as of 30 May 2021.

The 2020–21 Toulouse FC season was the club's 84th season in existence and its first season back in the second division of French football. In addition to the domestic league, Toulouse participated in this season's edition of the Coupe de France. The season covered the period from 1 July 2020 to 30 June 2021.

== Players ==
=== First-team squad ===
As of 11 February 2021

Note: Flags indicate national team as defined under FIFA eligibility rules; some limited exceptions apply. Players may hold more than one non-FIFA nationality.

No.	Pos.	Nation	Player
1	GK	URU	Mauro Goicoechea
2	DF	FRA	Kelvin Amian
3	DF	COL	Deiver Machado
4	DF	NOR	Ruben Gabrielsen (captain)
5	DF	FRA	Steven Moreira
7	FW	FRA	Wesley Saïd
8	MF	FRA	Kouadio Koné (on loan from Borussia M'gladbach)
9	FW	ENG	Rhys Healey
11	FW	COD	Ndombe Mubele
12	DF	BEL	Sébastien Dewaest (on loan from Genk)
14	MF	NED	Branco van den Boomen
15	FW	CIV	Vakoun Issouf Bayo (on loan from Celtic)
16	GK	FRA	Florentin Bloch
17	MF	NED	Stijn Spierings

No.	Pos.	Nation	Player
18	DF	URU	Agustín Rogel
19	DF	FRA	Bafodé Diakité
20	FW	GRE	Efthymis Koulouris
21	MF	FRA	Amine Adli
23	DF	FRA	Moussa Diarra
24	DF	FRA	Anthony Rouault
25	MF	CMR	Stève Mvoué
26	MF	FRA	Sam Sanna
27	FW	CMR	Stéphane Zobo
28	FW	FRA	Janis Antiste
29	MF	FRA	Nathan Ngoumou
30	GK	FRA	Maxime Dupé
31	MF	BEL	Brecht Dejaegere (on loan from Gent)
40	GK	SWE	Isak Pettersson

=== Out on loan ===
Note: Flags indicate national team as defined under FIFA eligibility rules; some limited exceptions apply. Players may hold more than one non-FIFA nationality.

No.	Pos.	Nation	Player
—	DF	FRA	Mathieu Gonçalves (on loan to Le Mans)
—	FW	COD	Aaron Leya Iseka (on loan to Metz)

No.	Pos.	Nation	Player
—	MF	FRA	Kalidou Sidibé (on loan to Châteauroux)
—	DF	GUI	Issiaga Sylla (on loan to Lens)

== Transfers ==
=== Out ===
Date from	Position	Nationality	Name	To	Notes	Ref.
9 October 2020	MF	(England)	John Bostock	Free agent	Mutual Consent	

== Pre-season and friendlies ==
Win Draw Loss Fixtures

21 July 2020 Friendly	Toulouse	3–3	Sète	Toulouse, France
18:00 CEST (UTC+2)	Koulouris 40'; Leya Iseka 63'; Sangaré 75' (pen.)	Report	Mané 15'; Patrao 41'; Ferhaoui 61'	Stadium: Stadium Annexe de Toulouse

31 July 2020 Friendly	Toulouse	2–2	Pau	Saint-Gaudens, France
19:00 CEST (UTC+2)	Gabrielsen 14'; Zobo 75'	Report	Assifuah 44'; Jarju 72'	Stadium: Stade de Sède

4 August 2020 Friendly	Toulouse	0–0	Bordeaux	Agen, France
19:00 CEST (UTC+2)		Report	Lauray (yellow card) 38'	Stadium: Stade Armandie; Attendance: 2,800; Referee: Olivier Thual

8 August 2020 Friendly	Rodez	Cancelled	Toulouse	Montauban, France
19:00 CEST (UTC+2)		Report		Stadium: Stade Jean-Verbeke

15 August 2020 Friendly	Toulouse	1–2	Niort	Villenave-d'Ornon, France
19:00 CEST (UTC+2)	Antiste 60'	Report	Bâ 8'; Koyalipou 27'	Stadium: Stade Alain-Roche

== Competitions ==
=== Overview ===
Competition	First match	Last match	Starting round	Final position	Record							
Competition	First match	Last match	Starting round	Final position	Pld	W	D	L	GF	GA	GD	Win %
Ligue 2	22 August 2020	15 May 2021	Matchday 1	3rd	38	20	10	8	71	42	+29	52.63
Ligue 1 promotion play-offs	21 May 2021	30 May 2021	Semi-finals	Runners-up	3	2	0	1	5	2	+3	66.67
Coupe de France	20 January 2021	20 April 2021	Eighth round	Quarter-finals	5	4	0	1	7	3	+4	80.00
Total					46	26	10	10	83	47	+36	56.52

Last updated: 30 May 2021
Source: Soccerway

=== Ligue 2 ===
==== League table ====
Pos	Team	Pld	W	D	L	GF	GA	GD	Pts	Promotion or Relegation
1	Troyes (C, P)	38	23	8	7	60	36	+24	77	Promotion to Ligue 1
2	Clermont (P)	38	21	9	8	61	25	+36	72	Promotion to Ligue 1
3	Toulouse	38	20	10	8	71	42	+29	70	Qualification to promotion play-offs
4	Grenoble	38	18	11	9	51	35	+16	65	Qualification to promotion play-offs
5	Paris FC	38	17	13	8	53	37	+16	64	Qualification to promotion play-offs

Source: Ligue 2
Rules for classification: 1) Points; 2) Goal difference; 3) Number of goals scored; 4) Head-to-head goal difference; 5) Fair play points
(C) Champions; (P) Promoted

==== Results summary ====
Overall								Home						Away					
Pld	W	D	L	GF	GA	GD	Pts	W	D	L	GF	GA	GD	W	D	L	GF	GA	GD
38	20	10	8	71	42	+29	70	13	4	2	44	18	+26	7	6	6	27	24	+3

Last updated: 15 May 2021.
Source: Ligue 2

==== Results by round ====
Round	1	2	3	4	5	6	7	8	9	10	11	12	13	14	15	16	17	18	19	20	21	22	23	24	25	26	27	28	29	30	31	32	33	34	35	36	37	38
Ground	H	A	H	A	H	H	A	H	A	H	A	H	A	H	A	H	A	H	A	H	A	H	A	A	H	A	H	A	H	A	H	A	H	A	H	A	H	A
Result	L	L	D	D	W	D	W	W	W	L	D	W	W	D	W	W	W	W	D	W	W	W	L	D	W	L	W	L	W	L	W	D	W	W	D	L	W	D
Position	14	20	17	17	14	15	12	4	4	4	4	4	4	4	4	3	3	2	2	2	2	2	2	2	2	2	3	3	2	2	2	2	2	2	2	3	3	3

Source: Ligue 2
A = Away; H = Home; W = Win; D = Draw; L = Loss

==== Matches ====
The league fixtures were announced on 9 July 2020.

22 August 2020 1	Toulouse	0–1	Dunkerque	Toulouse
15:00 CEST (UTC+2)	Koné (yellow card) 51'	Report	Pierre (yellow card) 31'; Bruneel 55'	Stadium: Stadium de Toulouse; Referee: Aurélien Petit

29 August 2020 2	Grenoble	5–3	Toulouse	Grenoble
19:00 CEST (UTC+2)	Nestor 12'; Anani 16'; Bénet 32'; Semedo 42'; Djitté 69'	Report	Bayo 30', 45'; Antiste 80'	Stadium: Stade des Alpes; Referee: Arnaud Baert

14 September 2020 3	Toulouse	0–0	Sochaux	Toulouse
20:45 CEST (UTC+2)	Adli (yellow card) 9'; Amian (yellow card) 65'; Healey (yellow card) 90+1'	Report	Soumaré (yellow card) 26'; Bedia (yellow card) 38'; Paye (yellow card) 61'; Ambri (yellow card) 80'; Ndiaye (yellow card) 90+3'	Stadium: Stadium de Toulouse; Attendance: 5,000; Referee: Johan Hamel

19 September 2020 4	Clermont	1–1	Toulouse	Clermont-Ferrand
15:00 CEST (UTC+2)	Berthomier 10'	Report	Antiste 88'	Stadium: Stade Gabriel Montpied; Attendance: 3,406; Referee: Pierre Gaillouste

26 September 2020 5	Toulouse	3–1	Auxerre	Toulouse
15:00 CEST (UTC+2)	Van den Boomen 69' (pen.); Moreira 86'; Healey 90+3'	Report	Le Bihan 58'	Stadium: Stadium de Toulouse; Attendance: 0 Referee: Mathieu Vernice

3 October 2020 6	Toulouse	0–0	Troyes	Toulouse
15:00 CEST (UTC+2)	Diakité (yellow card) 36' (yellow-red card) 53'; Gabrielsen (yellow card) 80'; Adli (yellow card) 90+4'; Sidibé (yellow card) 90+5'	Report	Tardieu (yellow card) 90+5'	Stadium: Stadium de Toulouse; Attendance: 0 Referee: Rémi Landry

17 October 2020 7	Ajaccio	0–1	Toulouse	Ajaccio
19:00 CEST (UTC+2)	Huard (yellow card) 29'; Laçi (yellow card) 37'; Avinel (yellow card) 52'; Kalulu (yellow card) 87' (yellow-red card) 90+2'; Barreto (yellow card) 90'	Report	Antiste (red card) 8'; Spierings (yellow card) 10', (goal) 87' (pen.); Sanna (yellow card) 38'; Dejaegere (yellow card) 54'	Stadium: Stade François Coty; Attendance: 2,200; Referee: Mehdi Mokhtari

24 October 2020 8	Toulouse	3–0	Rodez	Toulouse
19:00 CEST (UTC+2)	Dejaegere 13'; Amian 56'; Spierings (yellow card) 67', (goal) 90+6' (pen.); Van den Boomen (yellow card) 90+3'	Report	Ouammou (yellow card) 28'; Poujol (yellow card) 34'	Stadium: Stadium de Toulouse; Attendance: 540; Referee: Bartolomeu Varela

2 November 2020 9	Amiens	0–1	Toulouse	Amiens
20:45 CET (UTC+1)	Gomis (yellow card) 34'; Blin (red card) 47'; Sy (yellow card) 67'; Lusamba (yellow card) 89'	Report	Spierings 55'; Dejaegere (yellow card) 60'; Gabrielsen (yellow card) 90+1'	Stadium: Stade de la Licorne; Attendance: 0 Referee: Alexandre Perreau Niel

7 November 2020 10	Toulouse	4–5	Valenciennes	Toulouse
19:00 CET (UTC+1)	Adli 14', 23'; Amian (yellow card) 37'; Dejaegere 58'; Spierings (yellow card) 62'; Rouault (yellow card) 76'; Antiste 83'	Report	Elogo (yellow card) 11'; D'Almeida (yellow card) 21'; Cabral 26', (yellow card) 53'; Cuffaut 33', 63', 77', 86'	Stadium: Stadium de Toulouse; Attendance: 0 Referee: Sylvain Palhies

21 November 2020 11	Chambly	1–1	Toulouse	Chambly
19:00 CET (UTC+1)	David (yellow card) 19'; Doucouré 74'	Report	Koné (yellow card) 31'; Antiste 56'; Rouault (yellow card) 63'; Van den Boomen (yellow card) 65'; Amian (yellow card) 86'	Stadium: Stade des Marais; Attendance: 0 Referee: Romain Lissorgue

28 November 2020 12	Toulouse	2–1	Niort	Toulouse
15:00 CET (UTC+1)	Van den Boomen 9'; Bayo (yellow card) 78'; Healey 79'	Report	Bâ 7'; Kremen (yellow card) 90+4'	Stadium: Stadium de Toulouse; Attendance: 0 Referee: Gaël Angoula

1 December 2020 13	Nancy	1–3	Toulouse	Tomblaine
19:00 CET (UTC+1)	Biron 25'; Valette (yellow card) 64'; Akichi (yellow card) 77'	Report	Healey 54'; Spierings 65' (pen.), (yellow card) 89'; Rouault (red card) 70'; Adli 90+3'	Stadium: Stade Marcel Picot; Attendance: 0 Referee: Johan Hamel

5 December 2020 14	Toulouse	2–2	Guingamp	Toulouse
19:00 CET (UTC+1)	Healey 51'; Moreira (yellow card) 55'; Amian (yellow card) 63'; Antiste 73'	Report	Valdivia (yellow card) 50'; Gomis 56' (pen.); Livolant (yellow card) 65'; Ngbakoto 81'; Niakaté (yellow card) 88'; Fofana (yellow card) 90+4'	Stadium: Stadium de Toulouse; Attendance: 0 Referee: Rémi Landry

12 December 2020 15	Châteauroux	0–3	Toulouse	Châteauroux
19:00 CET (UTC+1)	M'Boné (yellow card) 42'; Cissé (yellow card) 65'; Fofana (yellow card) 70'; Leroy (yellow card) 90+1'	Report	Machado (yellow card) 18'; Spierings 37' (pen.); Healey 65'; Antiste 85'	Stadium: Stade Gaston Petit; Attendance: 0 Referee: Mathieu Vernice

19 December 2020 16	Toulouse	4–3	Le Havre	Toulouse
15:00 CET (UTC+1)	Healey 2', 12', (yellow card) 80'; Adli 31'; Amian (yellow card) 60'; Spierings 90+8' (pen.)	Report	Bonnet 19'; Gibaud (yellow card) 29'; Meraş 50', (yellow card) 90+4'; Basque (yellow card) 56'; Alioui 83'	Stadium: Stadium de Toulouse; Attendance: 0 Referee: Arnaud Baert

22 December 2020 17	Pau	0–3	Toulouse	Pau
20:00 CET (UTC+1)	Scaramozzino (yellow card) 80'	Report	Moreira (yellow card) 22'; Healey 30'; Amian 57'; Koné 84'	Stadium: Stade du Hameau; Attendance: 0 Referee: Bartolomeu Varela Teles

5 January 2021 18	Toulouse	1–0	Paris FC	Toulouse
20:00 CET (UTC+1)	Rouault (yellow card) 9' (yellow-red card) 32'; Moreira (yellow card) 14'; Dejaegere (yellow card) 18'; Spierings 66'	Report	Diakité (yellow card) 13'; Bamba (red card) 57'	Stadium: Stadium de Toulouse; Attendance: 0 Referee: Willy Delajod

11 January 2021 19	Caen	2–2	Toulouse	Caen
20:45 CET (UTC+1)	Nsona 10'; Mendy 18', (yellow card) 18'; Court (yellow card) 40'	Report	Amian (yellow card) 32'; Machado (yellow card) 38'; Diakité 45'; Ngoumou 79'	Stadium: Stade Michel d'Ornano; Attendance: 0 Referee: Bastien Dechepy

16 January 2021 20	Toulouse	2–0	Grenoble	Toulouse
15:00 CET (UTC+1)	Koné (yellow card) 36'}; Bayo 65'; Adli 73'	Report	Abdallah (yellow card) 51'; Monfray (yellow card) 64'; Pickel (yellow card) 71'	Stadium: Stadium de Toulouse; Attendance: 0 Referee: Romain Lissorgue

22 January 2021 21	Sochaux	0–1	Toulouse	Montbéliard
20:45 CET (UTC+1)	Lasme (yellow card) 39'; M'Bakata (yellow card) 55'; Ambri (yellow card) 90+1'	Report	Diakité 54'; Van den Boomen (yellow card) 75'; Koné (yellow card) 90+4'	Stadium: Stade Auguste Bonal; Attendance: 0 Referee: Mehdi Mokhtari

30 January 2021 22	Toulouse	3–2	Clermont	Toulouse
15:00 CET (UTC+1)	Van den Boomen 5', 50'; Spierings (yellow card) 21', (goal) 67'; Dejaegere (yellow card) 53'; Antiste (yellow card) 90+2'	Report	Magnin (yellow card) 23'; Allevinah 42'; Iglesias 85'	Stadium: Stadium de Toulouse; Attendance: 0 Referee: Karim Abed

2 February 2021 23	Auxerre	3–1	Toulouse	Auxerre
20:00 (CET) (UTC+1)	Dugimont 4', 77'; Ngando 42'; Bernard (yellow card) 90+2'	Report	Healey (yellow card) 80', (goal) 90+3' (pen.); Spierings (penalty missed) 84'; Machado (yellow card) 88'	Stadium: Stade de l'Abbé-Deschamps; Attendance: 0 Referee: Guillaume Paradis

6 February 2021 24	Troyes	1–1	Toulouse	Troyes
15:00 CET (UTC+1)	Giraudon (yellow card) 29'; Salmier (yellow card) 36'; Dingomé 49'; El Hajjam (yellow card) 90+3'	Report	Adli 15'; Spierings (yellow card) 30'; Dejaegere (yellow card) 38'; Healey (yellow card) 70'	Stadium: Stade de l'Aube; Attendance: 0 Referee: Benoît Millot

15 February 2021 25	Toulouse	3–0	Ajaccio	Toulouse
20:45 CET (UTC+1)	Machado 27'; Gabrielsen (yellow card) 47'; Adli (yellow card) 85', (goal) 86'; Bayo 90+1'	Report	Coutadeur (yellow card) 62'	Stadium: Stadium de Toulouse; Attendance: 0 Referee: Jérémy Stinat

20 February 2021 26	Rodez	1–0	Toulouse	Rodez
19:00 CET (UTC+1)	Boissier (yellow card) 39'; Bonnet 41'; Sanaia (yellow card) 78'; Leborgne (yellow card) 82'	Report	Bayo (yellow card) 78'; Adli (yellow card) 84'; Moreira (yellow card) 90'	Stadium: Stade Paul-Lignon; Attendance: 0 Referee: Olivier Thual

27 February 2021 27	Toulouse	3–0	Amiens	Toulouse
15:00 CET (UTC+1)	Healey 15'; Spierings 41' (pen.); Van den Boomen (yellow card) 44'; Bayo 86'	Report	Lomotey (yellow card) 37'; Coly (yellow card) 39'	Stadium: Stadium de Toulouse; Referee: Eric Wattellier

2 March 2021 28	Valenciennes	1–0	Toulouse	Valenciennes
20:00 CET (UTC+1)	Guillaume 19'; Kankava (yellow card) 88'	Report	Koné (yellow card) 77'	Stadium: Stade du Hainaut; Referee: Abdelatif Kherradji

13 March 2021 29	Toulouse	4–0	Chambly	Toulouse
20:00 CET (UTC+1)	Machado (yellow card) 26'; Van den Boomen 56'; Amian 68'; Koné 79'; Bayo 86'	Report	Camelo (yellow card) 30'	Stadium: Stadium de Toulouse; Referee: Guillaume Paradis

20 March 2021 30	Niort	1–0	Toulouse	Niort
20:00 CET (UTC+1)	Bâ 87'	Report	Moreira (red card) 90+6'	Stadium: Stade René Gaillard; Attendance: 0 Referee: Mehdi Mokhtari

3 April 2021 31	Toulouse	4–1	Nancy	Toulouse
15:00 CEST (UTC+2)	Gabrielsen (yellow card) 16', (goal) 50'; Ciss 32' (o.g.); Healey (yellow card) 36'; Antiste 47'; Adli 62'; Spierings (yellow card) 82'	Report	Bassi 43'; Triboulet (yellow card) 77'	Stadium: Stadium de Toulouse; Attendance: 0 Referee: Romain Lissorgue

12 April 2021 32	Guingamp	1–1	Toulouse	Guingamp
20:45 CEST (UTC+2)	Livolant 27'; Mellot (yellow card) 55'; Sampaio (yellow card) 71'; Niakaté (yellow card) 90+2'	Report	Healey 37'; Koné (yellow card) 40'; Sanna (yellow card) 50'	Stadium: Stade de Roudourou; Attendance: 0 Referee: Alexandre Perreau Niel

17 April 2021 33	Toulouse	1–0	Châteauroux	Toulouse
20:00 CEST (UTC+2)	Amian 52'; Bayo (yellow card) 56'	Report	Ibara (yellow card) 48'; Canelhas (yellow card) 89'	Stadium: Stadium de Toulouse; Attendance: 0 Referee: Nicolas Rainville

1 May 2021 36	Paris FC	3–1	Toulouse	Paris
15:00 CEST (UTC+2)	Martin 12'; Name (yellow card) 22', (goal) 86'; Arab 90+4'	Report	Bayo 16'; Diakité (yellow card) 26'; Spierings (yellow card) 55'; Adli (yellow card) 78'	Stadium: Stade Sébastien Charléty; Attendance: 0 Referee: Benjamin Lepaysant

4 May 2021 34	Le Havre	0–1	Toulouse	Le Havre
19:00 CET (UTC+1)	Bonnet (yellow card) 4' (yellow-red card) 60'; Lekhal (yellow card) 69'; Boutaïb (yellow card) 89'	Report	Koné 28'; Van den Boomen (yellow card) 47'; Gabrielsen (yellow card) 70'; Spierings (yellow card) 77'; Dewaest (yellow card) 83'	Stadium: Stade Océane; Attendance: 0 Referee: Rémi Landry

8 May 2021 37	Toulouse	3–0	Caen	Toulouse
20:00 CEST (UTC+2)	Dejaegere 30'; Bayo 67'; Ngoumou 81'	Report	Court (penalty missed) 47'; Weber (yellow card) 57'; Yago (yellow card) 66' (yellow-red card) 66'; Mbala (yellow card) 82'	Stadium: Stadium de Toulouse; Attendance: 0 Referee: Florent Batta

12 May 2021 35	Toulouse	2–2	Pau	Toulouse
19:00 CEST (UTC+2)	Bayo 9', 54'; Gabrielsen (yellow card) 29'; Koné (yellow card) 84'	Report	Daubin (yellow card) 22'; Koffi 46'; Dembélé (yellow card) 53'; Diarra (yellow card) 53'; Assifuah 66'	Stadium: Stadium de Toulouse; Attendance: 0 Referee: Willy Delajod

15 May 2021 38	Dunkerque	3–3	Toulouse	Dunkerque
20:00 CEST (UTC+2)	Dudouit 33' (pen.); Boudaud 49'; Tchokounté 73'; Maraval (yellow card) 78'	Report	Healey 27', 79' (pen.), 87'; Sanna (yellow card) 32'; Mvoué (red card) 68'	Stadium: Stade Marcel-Tribut; Attendance: 0 Referee: Johan Hamel

==== Promotion play-offs ====
21 May 2021 Semi-finals	Toulouse	3–0	Grenoble	Toulouse
20:45 CEST (UTC+2)	Spierings (penalty missed) 3', 3'; Dejaegere (yellow card) 16'; Koné 23'; Adli (yellow card) 69'; Healey 90+2'	Report	Pickel (yellow card) 4'; Djitté (yellow card) 36'; Belmonte (yellow card) 54'	Stadium: Stadium de Toulouse; Attendance: 0 Referee: Amaury Delerue

27 May 2021 Final First leg	Toulouse	1–2	Nantes	Toulouse
20:45 CEST (UTC+2)	Machado 19'; Koné (yellow card) 63'; Moreira (yellow card) 72'	Report	Blas 10'; Kolo Muani 22'; Chirivella (yellow card) 46'	Stadium: Stadium de Toulouse; Attendance: 0 Referee: Jérémie Pignard

30 May 2021 Final Second leg	Nantes	0–1 (2 (a)–2 agg.)	Toulouse	Nantes
18:00 CEST (UTC+2)	Appiah (yellow card) 5'; Kolo Muani (yellow card) 41'; Chirivella (yellow card) 77'	Report	Bayo (yellow card) 53', (goal) 62'; Machado (yellow card) 70'; Antiste (yellow card) 81'; Ngoumou (red card) 87'	Stadium: Stade de la Beaujoire; Attendance: 0 Referee: Benoît Bastien

=== Coupe de France ===
20 January 2021 Eighth round	Toulouse	1–0	Niort	Toulouse
18:00 CET (UTC+1)	Bayo 37'	Report		Stadium: Stadium de Toulouse; Attendance: 0 Referee: Nicolas Rainville

10 February 2021 Round of 64	Bordeaux	0–2	Toulouse	Bordeaux
14:45 CET (UTC+1)	Mara (yellow card) 30'	Report	Dewaest (yellow card) 36'; Bayo 39'; Antiste 57'	Stadium: Matmut Atlantique; Attendance: 0 Referee: Hakim Ben El Hadj

5 March 2021 Round of 32	Aubagne FC	0–2	Toulouse	Martigues
21:00 CET (UTC+1)	Petrozzi (yellow card) 88'	Report	Koné 9'; Ngoumou 53'	Stadium: Stade Francis Turcan; Attendance: 0 Referee: Aurélien Petit

7 April 2021 Round of 16	Olympique Saumur FC	1–2	Toulouse	Saumur
18:45 CEST (UTC+2)	Coquau (yellow card) 15'; Bouhoutt 32'; Billeaux (yellow card) 42'; Kamguem (yellow card) 78'	Report	Spierings 20' (pen.); Diakité (yellow card) 45'; Kasongo 67'	Stadium: Stade des Rives du Thouet; Attendance: 0 Referee: Johan Hamel

20 April 2021 Quarter-finals	GFA Rumilly-Vallières	2–0	Toulouse	Annecy
18:45 CEST (UTC+2)	Guillaud 19'; Rouault 83' (o.g.)	Report	Rouault (yellow card) 58'; Pettersson (yellow card) 85'	Stadium: Parc des Sports; Attendance: 0 Referee: Jérôme Brisard

== Statistics ==
=== Goalscorers ===
As of 27 May 2021

Rank	No.	Pos.	Nat.	Name	Ligue 2	Coupe de France	Total
1	9	FW	(England)	Rhys Healey	15	0	16
Totals					75	7	82
