= Moussa Camara (disambiguation) =

- Moussa Dadis Camara (born 1964 or 1968), Military Guinean president in 2009 following a coup d'état
- Moussa Camara (athlete) (born 1988), Malian middle-distance runner
- Moussa Camara (defender), Guinean footballer
- Moussa Camara (goalkeeper) (born 1998), Guinean footballer

== See also ==
- Moussa Kamara (born 1999), Gambian footballer
