= Vakoun Issouf Bayo =

Ivorian footballer (born 1997)

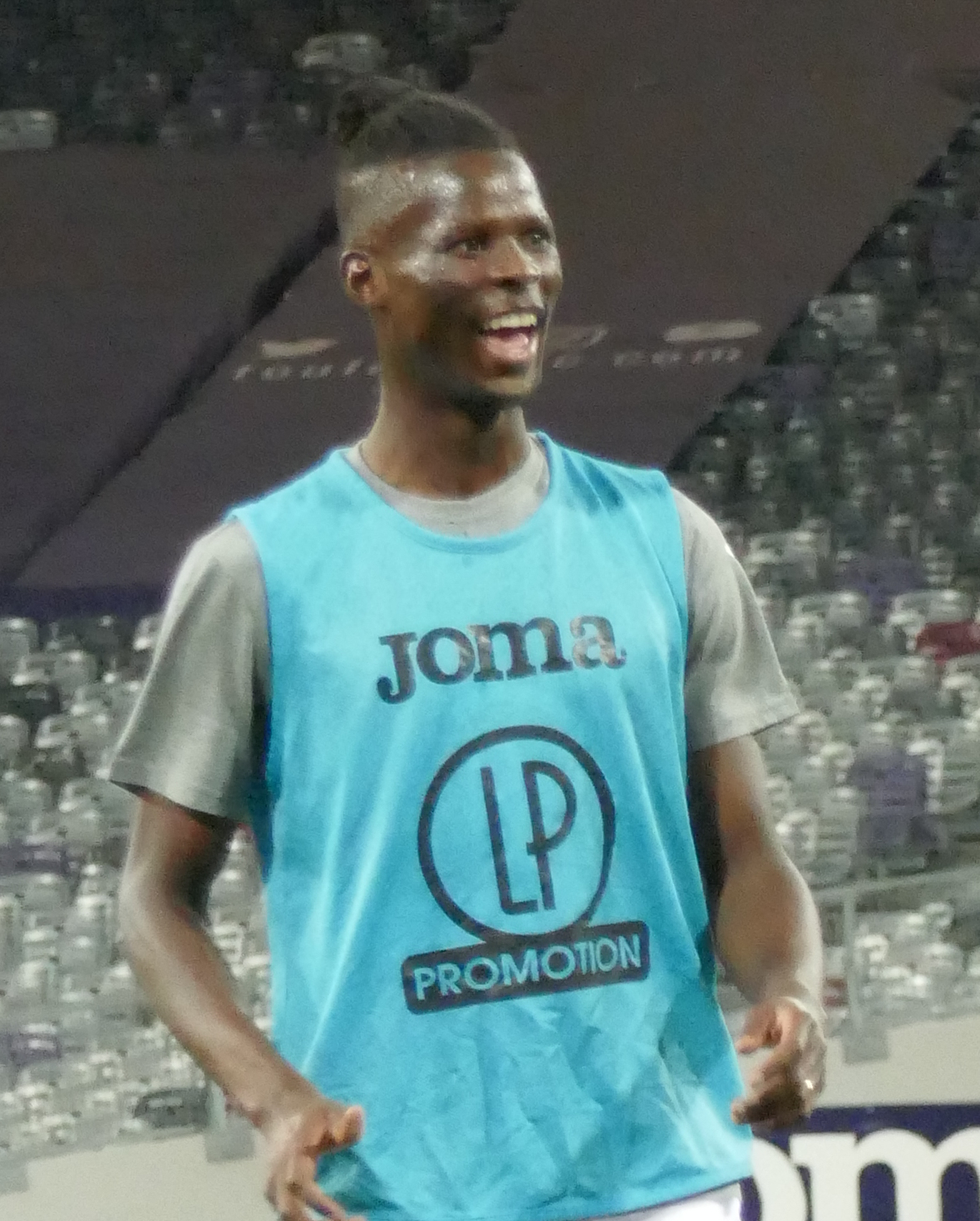
- Bayo with Toulouse in 2020

Personal information
- Full name: Vakoun Issouf Bayo
- Date of birth: 10 January 1997 (age 29)
- Place of birth: Daloa, Ivory Coast
- Height: 1.84 m (6 ft 0 in)
- Position: Forward

Team information
- Current team: Udinese
- Number: 15

Youth career
- Stade d'Abidjan

Senior career*
Years	Team	Apps	(Gls)
2015–2017	Étoile du Sahel	11	(0)
2018–2019	Dunajská Streda	25	(14)
2019–2021	Celtic	9	(0)
2020–2021	→ Toulouse (loan)	31	(10)
2021–2022	Gent	3	(0)
2022	→ Charleroi (loan)	16	(11)
2022	Charleroi	0	(0)
2022–2024	Watford	63	(10)
2023	→ Charleroi (loan)	10	(3)
2024–	Udinese	15	(2)
2024–2025	→ Watford (loan)	41	(10)

International career^{‡}
2015	Ivory Coast U23	4	(1)
2018–	Ivory Coast	9	(3)
- * Club domestic league appearances and goals as of 25 May 2026 ‡ National team caps and goals as of 18:39, 23 November 2025 (UTC)

Vakoun Issouf Bayo (born 10 January 1997) is an Ivorian professional footballer who plays as a forward for Serie A club Udinese and the Ivory Coast national team. He is nicknamed The Crow.

== Club career ==
=== Dunajská Streda ===
Bayo joined Dunajská Streda in March 2018. He made his Slovak league debut against Slovan Bratislava on 18 March 2018.

=== Celtic ===
Bayo moved to Scottish Premiership club Celtic in January 2019. He was left out of the Celtic squad for the latter stages of the 2018–19 UEFA Europa League, with the club only able to register three of their four January window signings. He made his debut for Celtic against Kilmarnock on 17 February 2019, coming on as a late substitute shortly before Scott Brown scored a late winner.

==== Toulouse (loan) ====
On 12 August 2020, Bayo signed for French club Toulouse, on a one-year loan, with an additional option to buy.

=== Gent ===
On 9 July 2021, Bayo signed for Belgian First Division A club Gent on a four-year deal.

=== Charleroi ===
On 22 December 2021, Bayo agreed to join Charleroi on loan until the end of the season, with an option to buy. On 16 May 2022, Charleroi confirmed that they had exercised the option to purchase and had signed Bayo on a contract until 2026 after a successful loan spell that saw him score eleven goals in sixteen matches.

=== Watford ===
On 2 July 2022, Bayo joined EFL Championship club Watford on a five-year deal.

=== Charleroi (loan) ===
On 30 January 2023, Bayo rejoined Charleroi on loan until the end of the season.

=== Udinese ===
On 29 August 2024, Bayo signed a four-season contract with Udinese in Italy, and was loaned back to Watford for the rest of the 2024–25 season.

== Career statistics ==
As of match played 9 February 2026

Appearances and goals by club, season and competition
Club	Season	League			National cup (Note: Includes appearances in Slovak Cup, Scottish Cup, Coupe de France, Belgian Cup, FA Cup)		League cup (Note: Includes Scottish League Cup, EFL Cup)		Other		Total	
Club	Season	Division	Apps	Goals	Apps	Goals	Apps	Goals	Apps	Goals	Apps	Goals
Étoile du Sahel	2015-16	CLP-1	2	0	0	0	–		4 (Note: Appearance(s) in CAF Confederation Cup)	0	6	0
Étoile du Sahel	2016–17	CLP-1	9	0	0	0	–		–		9	0
Étoile du Sahel	Total		11	0	0	0	0	0	4	0	15	0
Dunajská Streda	2017–18	Slovak Super Liga	9	4	0	0	–		–		9	4
Dunajská Streda	2018–19	Slovak Super Liga	16	10	3	5	–		4 (Note: Appearance(s) in UEFA Europa League)	3	23	18
Dunajská Streda	Total		25	14	3	5	0	0	4	3	32	22
Celtic	2018–19	Scottish Premiership	1	0	0	0	0	0	0	0	1	0
Celtic	2019–20	Scottish Premiership	8	0	2	1	1	1	5 (Note: One appearance in UEFA Champions League and four appearances in UEFA Europa League)	0	16	2
Celtic	Total		9	0	2	1	1	1	5	0	17	2
Toulouse (loan)	2020–21	Ligue 2	31	10	3	2	0	0	2 (Note: Appearance(s) in Ligue 1 relegation/promotion play-offs)	1	36	13
Gent	2021–22	Belgian First Division A	3	0	1	0	—		3 (Note: Appearance(s) in UEFA Europa Conference League)	0	7	0
Charleroi (loan)	2021–22	Belgian First Division A	16	11	0	0	—		—		16	11
Watford	2022–23	Championship	24	4	0	0	1	0	—		25	4
Watford	2023–24	Championship	39	6	2	0	1	1	—		42	7
Watford	Total		63	10	2	0	2	1	—		67	11
Charleroi (loan)	2022–23	Belgian First Division A	10	3	0	0	—		—		10	3
Udinese	2024–25	Serie A	0	0	0	0	—		—		0	0
Udinese	2025–26	Serie A	14	0	1	0	—		0	0	14	0
Watford (loan)	2024–25	Championship	41	10	0	0	1	0	—		42	10
Career total			219	60	12	8	4	2	18	4	256	74

=== International ===
As of match played 18 November 2025

Appearances and goals by national team and year
National team	Year	Apps	Goals
Ivory Coast
Ivory Coast	2018	2	0
Ivory Coast	2024	2	1
Ivory Coast	2025	5	2
Total		9	3

As of match played 18 November 2025. Ivory Coast score listed first, score column indicates score after each Capradossi goal.

List of international goals scored by Vakoun Issouf Bayo
No.	Date	Venue	Opponent	Score	Result	Competition
1	19 November 2024	Felix Houphouet Boigny Stadium, Abidjan, Ivory Coast	Chad	1–0	4–0	2025 Africa Cup of Nations qualification
2	5 September 2025	Felix Houphouet Boigny Stadium, Abidjan, Ivory Coast	Burundi	1–0	1–0	2026 FIFA World Cup qualification
3	18 November 2025	Al-Seeb Stadium, Seeb, Oman	Oman	1–0	2–0	Friendly

== Honours ==
Celtic

- Scottish Premiership: 2018–19, 2019–20
