= Manu Koné =

French footballer (born 2001)

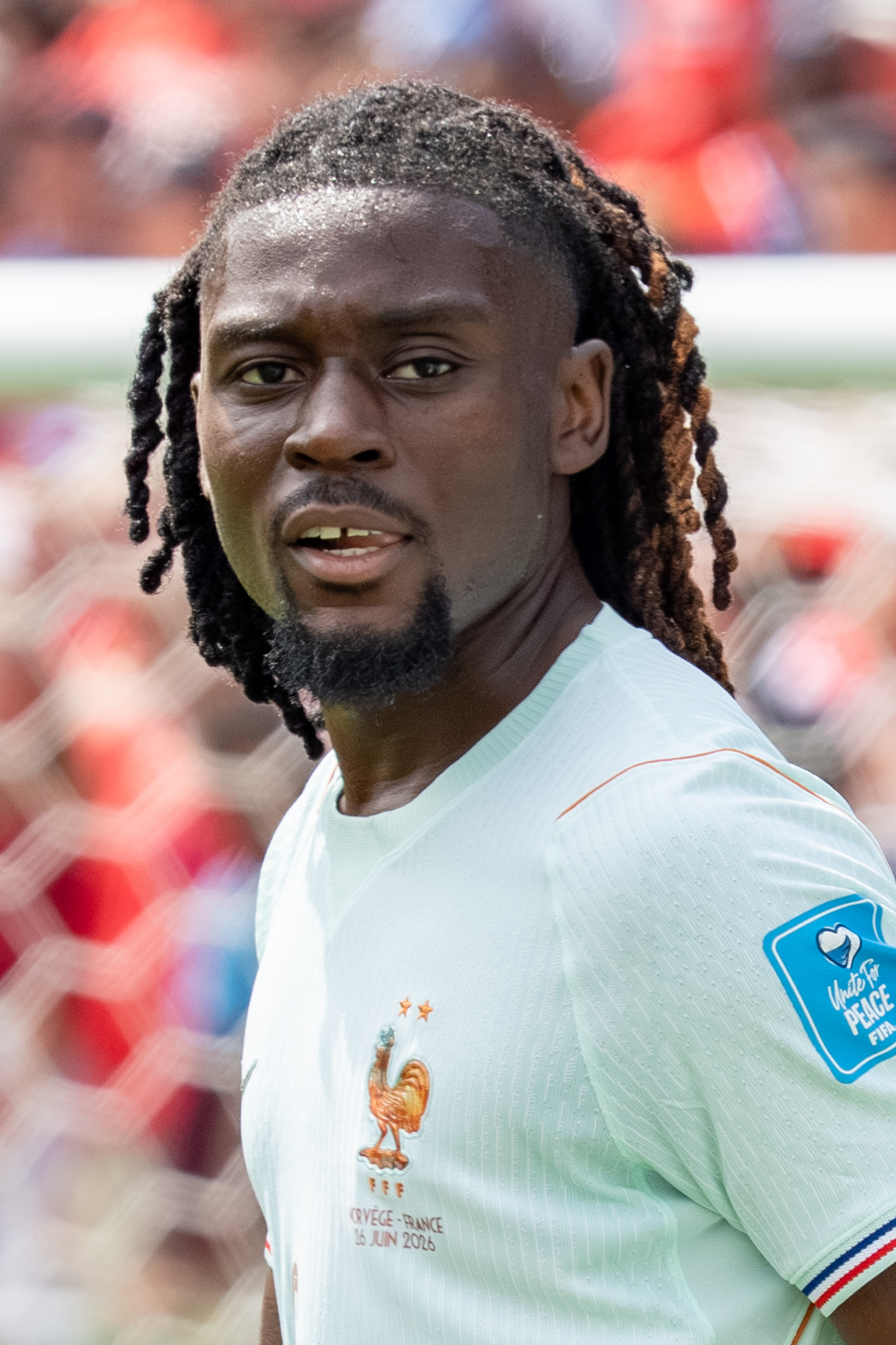
- Koné with France in 2026

Personal information
- Full name: Kouadio Emmanuel Boris Koné
- Date of birth: 17 May 2001 (age 25)
- Place of birth: Colombes, Hauts-de-Seine, France
- Height: 1.85 m (6 ft 1 in)
- Position: Midfielder

Team information
- Current team: Roma
- Number: 17

Youth career
- 2007–2012: Villeneuve-la-Garenne
- 2012–2015: Paris FC
- 2015–2016: Boulogne-Billancourt
- 2016–2018: Toulouse

Senior career*
Years	Team	Apps	(Gls)
2018–2020	Toulouse B	19	(1)
2019–2021	Toulouse	50	(3)
2021–2025	Borussia Mönchengladbach	79	(4)
2024–2025	→ Roma (loan)	34	(2)
2025–	Roma	37	(4)

International career^{‡}
2018–2019	France U18	5	(1)
2019	France U19	8	(0)
2022–2023	France U21	11	(0)
2024	France Olympic	9	(0)
2024–	France	22	(0)
Medal record
Men's football
Representing France
UEFA Nations League
Third place	2025 Germany	Team
Olympic Games
Silver medal – second place	2024 Paris	Team
- * Club domestic league appearances and goals as of 23:21, 21 November 2026 (UTC) ‡ National team caps and goals as of 6 October 2026

Kouadio Emmanuel Boris "Manu" Koné (born 17 May 2001) is a French professional footballer who plays as a midfielder for Serie A club Roma and the France national team.

== Early life ==
Koné was born in Colombes, Hauts-de-Seine, and was born to Ivorian parents.

== Club career ==
=== Toulouse ===
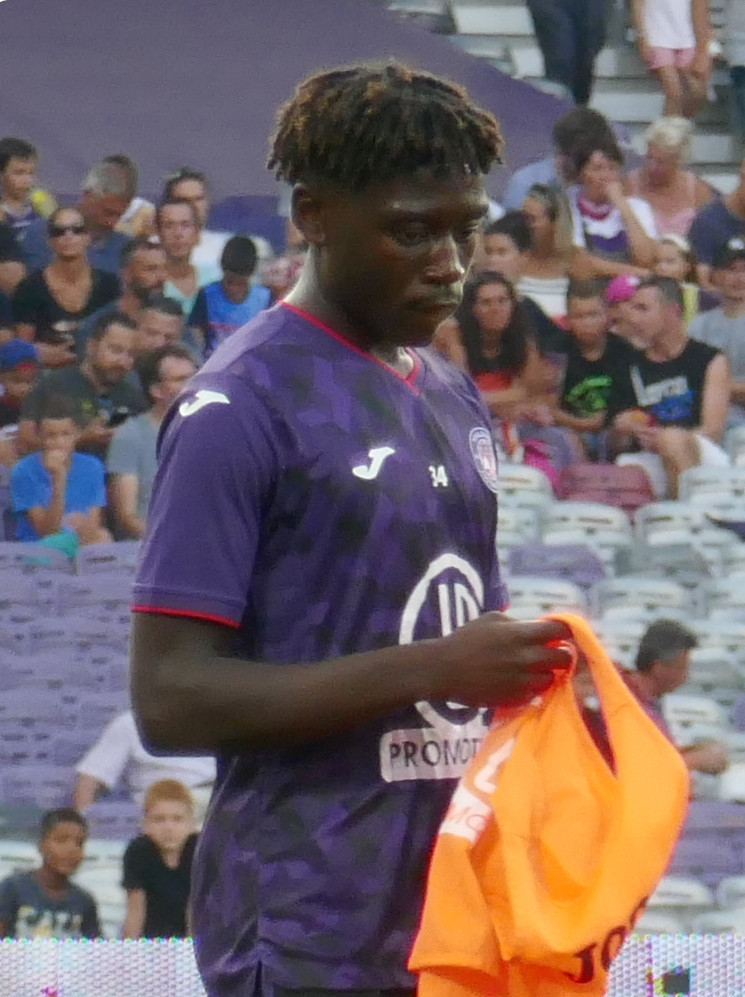
Koné with Toulouse in 2019

Koné made his professional debut for Toulouse in a 2–1 loss to Dijon on 24 May 2019.

=== Borussia Mönchengladbach ===
On 21 January 2021, Bundesliga club Borussia Mönchengladbach announced the signing of Koné on a deal running until 2025, while also confirming that he would finish the 2020–21 season at Toulouse. The reported fee for the midfielder was €9 million. After completing the move in the summer, Koné was given the number 17 jersey at Mönchengladbach. Upon signing for the new club, he stated that Gladbach was desperate to get him, and at some point, he could not say no: "They tried everything, and that impressed me". Koné scored his first goal for Gladbach in a 5–0 DFB-Pokal win over Bayern Munich on 27 October 2021.

Koné was tied for most yellow cards in the 2022–23 season in the Bundesliga with Jeffrey Gouweleeuw of FC Augsburg, as they both accumulated 12 bookings over the course of the league competition. Koné played a total of 30 league matches, scoring his only goal on 11 November 2022 in a 4–2 win against Borussia Dortmund, as Gladbach finished the season in the 10th position.

The beginning of Koné's 2023–24 season was disrupted by a knee injury, suffered while being on international duty in June. Koné once again scored his only league goal against Dortmund, this time in a 4–2 loss on 25 November 2023. He was sidelined for another month after injuring his thigh playing an international friendly match on 28 March.

=== Roma ===
On 30 August 2024, Koné moved to Italy, and joined Serie A club Roma for an €18 million estimated fee, signing a five-year contract. The deal was structured as a loan for the 2024–25 season, followed by an obligation to buy. Koné made his debut for the Gialorossi two days later, on 1 September, as a substitute in the 0–0 draw against Juventus. He made his first start for his new team on 15 September in a 1–1 draw against Genoa. On 27 October, he scored his first goal for Roma in a 5–1 loss against Fiorentina in the Serie A.

Koné quickly established himself as an indispensable figure in Roma's midfield, with particularly notable performances in the UEFA Europa League, where he delivered standout displays, such as in the 3–0 victory over Braga on 12 December, where he registered an assist, made 7 key passes, and completed 46 out of 51 passes. After Roma finished fifth in the Serie A for the 2024–25 season, after a late surge under new manager Claudio Ranieri, Koné described the season as "complicated", lamenting the fact that the club changed three coaches during the season: Daniele De Rossi, Ivan Jurić and Ranieri.

== International career ==
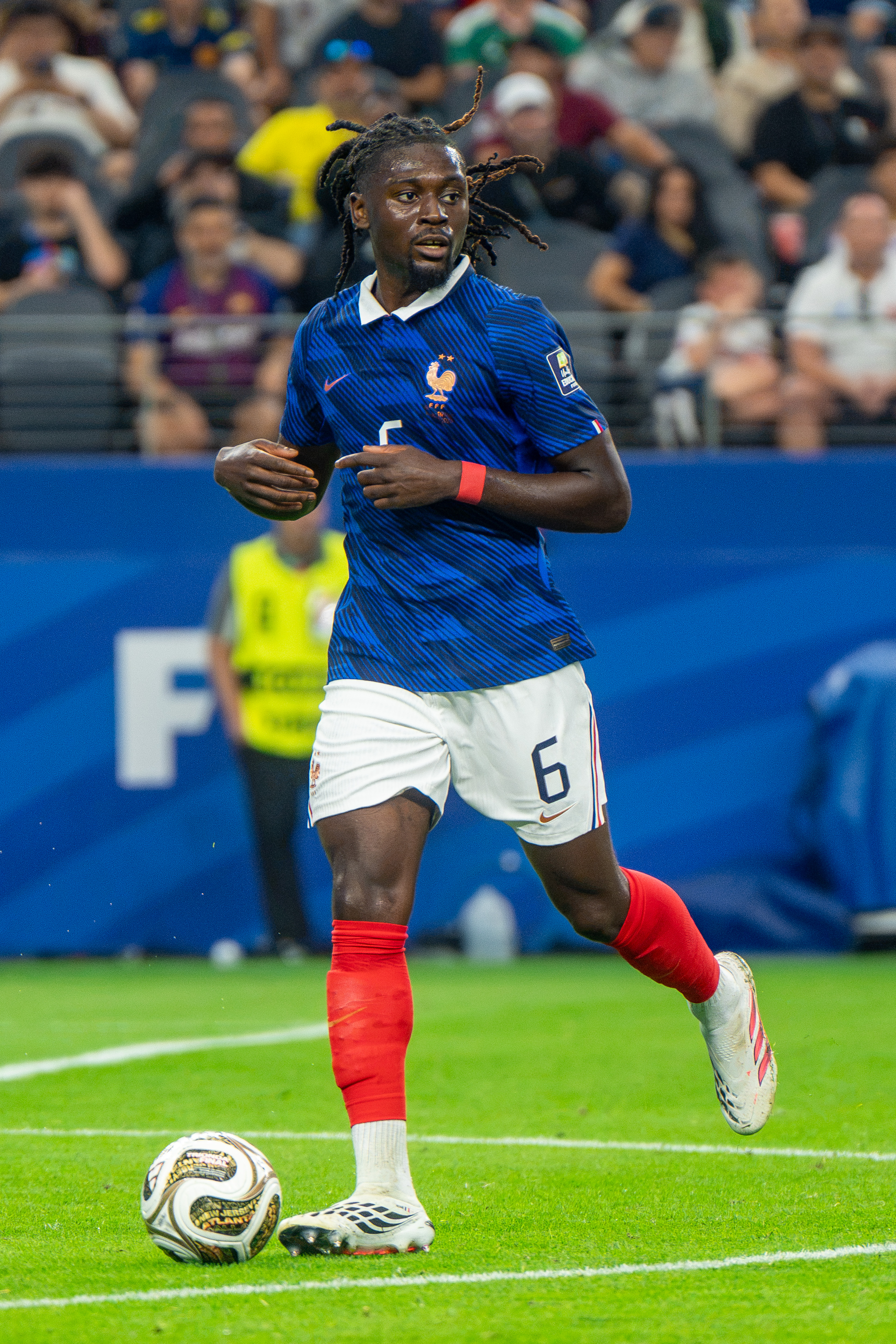
Koné with France at the 2026 FIFA World Cup

Koné represented France as a youth international, competing at the U18, U19 and U21 level. Koné was also a member of France's team at the 2024 Summer Olympics, winning a silver medal after losing 5–3 in the final against Spain.

Koné made his debut for the senior France national team on 6 September 2024 in a Nations League game against Italy at the Parc des Princes. He substituted Youssouf Fofana in the 58th minute of a 3–1 loss for France.

On 14 May 2026, Koné was selected in the 26-man squad for the 2026 FIFA World Cup.

== Personal life ==
Koné is the son of Alexandre and Thérèse. He has five siblings. He is a Christian.

== Career statistics ==
=== Club ===
As of match played 21 November 2026

Appearances and goals by club, season and competition
Club	Season	League			National cup (Note: Includes Coupe de France, DFB-Pokal, Coppa Italia)		League cup (Note: Includes Coupe de la Ligue)		Europe		Other		Total	
Club	Season	Division	Apps	Goals	Apps	Goals	Apps	Goals	Apps	Goals	Apps	Goals	Apps	Goals
Toulouse B	2018–19	Championnat National 3	13	0	—		—		—		—		13	0
Toulouse B	2019–20	Championnat National 3	6	1	—		—		—		—		6	1
Toulouse B	Total		19	1	—		—		—		—		19	1
Toulouse	2018–19	Ligue 1	1	0	0	0	0	0	—		—		1	0
Toulouse	2019–20	Ligue 1	13	0	1	0	2	1	—		—		16	1
Toulouse	2020–21 (Note: Koné was on loan at Toulouse for the second half of the 2020–21 season)	Ligue 2	36	3	3	1	—		—		3 (Note: Appearances in Ligue 1 relegation/promotion play-offs)	1	42	5
Toulouse	Total		50	3	4	1	2	1	—		3	1	59	6
Borussia Mönchengladbach	2021–22	Bundesliga	27	2	2	1	—		—		—		29	3
Borussia Mönchengladbach	2022–23	Bundesliga	30	1	1	0	—		—		—		31	1
Borussia Mönchengladbach	2023–24	Bundesliga	22	1	3	1	—		—		—		25	2
Borussia Mönchengladbach	2024–25	Bundesliga	0	0	1	0	—		—		—		1	0
Borussia Mönchengladbach	Total		79	4	7	2	—		—		—		86	6
Roma (loan)	2024–25	Serie A	34	2	1	0	—		10 (Note: Appearances in UEFA Europa League)	0	—		45	2
Roma	2025–26	Serie A	29	2	1	0	—		7	0	—		37	2
Roma	2026–27	Serie A	8	2	0	0	—		2 (Note: Appearances in UEFA Champions League)	0	—		10	2
Roma	Roma total		71	6	2	0	—		19	0	—		92	6
Career total			219	14	13	3	2	1	19	0	3	1	256	19

=== International ===
As of match played 5 October 2026

Appearances and goals by national team and year
National team	Year	Apps	Goals
France	2024	4	0
France	2025	8	0
France	2026	10	0
Total		22	0

== Honours ==
France U23

- Summer Olympics silver medal: 2024

France

- UEFA Nations League third place: 2024–25

Orders

- Knight of the National Order of Merit: 2024
