= 2024–25 Pogoń Szczecin season =

Pogoń Szczecin
2024–25 season
- Manager: Jens Gustafsson
- Stadium: Florian Krygier Stadium
- Ekstraklasa: 4th
- Polish Cup: Runners-up
- Top goalscorer: League: Efthymis Koulouris (25); All: Efthymis Koulouris (29)
- Highest home attendance: 18,743 vs Korona Kielce
- Lowest home attendance: 17,169 vs Stal Mielec
- Average home league attendance: 17,791
- Biggest win: Pogoń Szczecin 3–0 Korona Kielce
Home colours	Away colours

The 2024–25 season was the 77th season in the history of Pogoń Szczecin, and the club's 13th consecutive season in Ekstraklasa, in which they finished 4th. The club also entered the Polish Cup and finished as runners-up after losing to Legia Warsaw in the final.

== Transfers ==
=== In ===
Pos.	Player	Transferred from	Fee	Date	Source
MF	(Poland) Aron Stasiak	(Poland) Świt Szczecin	Loan return	30 June 2024	
MF	(Iran) Yadegar Rostami	(Poland) ŁKS Łódź	Loan return	30 June 2024	
FW	(Poland) Kacper Kostorz	(Netherlands) FC Den Bosch	Loan return	30 June 2024	
GK	(Romania) Valentin Cojocaru	(Belgium) Oud-Heverlee Leuven	Undisclosed	1 July 2024	

=== Out ===
Pos.	Player	Transferred to	Fee	Date	Source
GK	(Poland) Axel Holewinski	(Poland) Polonia Bytom	Loan	5 July 2024	
FW	(Poland) Kacper Kostorz	(Netherlands) NAC Breda	Loan	9 July 2024	
MF	(Poland) Aron Stasiak	(Poland) Świt Szczecin	Contract termination	18 July 2024	
DF	(Austria) Benedikt Zech	(Austria) Rheindorf Altach	Free	1 January 2025	

== Friendlies ==
=== Pre-season ===
23 June 2024 Friendly	Pogoń Szczecin (Poland)	1–1	(Czech Republic) Sigma Olomouc	Opalenica
17:00	Paryzek 84'		Navrátil 14'	Stadium: Stadion Miejski

26 June 2024 Friendly	Pogoń Szczecin (Poland)	0–1	(Poland) Piast Gliwice	Opalenica
18:05			Huk 41'	Stadium: Hotel Remes Sport & Spa

29 June 2024 Friendly	Pogoń Szczecin (Poland)	2–1	(Czech Republic) Baník Ostrava	Opalenica
18:00	Paryzek 5'; Bichakhchyan 34'		Rusnák 54'; (penalty missed) 62'	Stadium: Hotel Remes Sport & Spa

== Competitions ==
=== Overall record ===
Competition	First match	Last match	Starting round	Record							
Competition	First match	Last match	Starting round	Pld	W	D	L	GF	GA	GD	Win %
Ekstraklasa	20 July 2024	24–25 May 2025	Matchday 1	4	2	1	1	6	3	+3	50.00
Polish Cup				0	0	0	0	0	0	+0	—
Total				4	2	1	1	6	3	+3	50.00

Last updated: 10 August 2024
Source: Soccerway

=== Ekstraklasa ===
==== League table ====
Pos	Team	Pld	W	D	L	GF	GA	GD	Pts	Qualification or relegation
2	Raków Częstochowa	34	20	9	5	51	23	+28	69	Qualification for Conference League second qualifying round
3	Jagiellonia Białystok	34	17	10	7	56	42	+14	61	Qualification for Conference League second qualifying round
4	Pogoń Szczecin	34	17	7	10	59	40	+19	58	
5	Legia Warsaw	34	15	9	10	60	45	+15	54	Qualification for Europa League first qualifying round (Note: The 2024–25 Polish Cup winners (Legia Warsaw) qualify for the Europa League first qualifying round.)
6	Cracovia	34	14	9	11	58	53	+5	51	

Source: ekstraklasa.org 90minut.pl
Rules for classification: 1) Points; 2) Head-to-head points; 3) Head-to-head goal difference; 4) Goal difference; 5) Goals scored; 6) Number of wins; 7) Number of away wins; 8) Lower number of points based on yellow and red cards (red card = 3 points, yellow card = 1 point, sending-off = 3 points - including 1 point for first yellow card); 9) Fairplay ranking; 10) Draw.
(Note: Head-to-head record is used only after all the matches between the teams in question have been played)

==== Matches ====
Ekstraklasa match details
Date	Time	Opponent	Venue	Result F–A	Scorers		Ref.
Date	Time	Opponent	Venue	Result F–A	Pogoń Szczecin	Opponent	Ref.
20 July 2024	17:30	Korona Kielce	Home	3–0	Koulouris 35', 47' pen., Łukasiak 84'		
28 July 2024	14:45	Zagłębie Lubin	Away	2–2	Koulouris 17', Paryzek 83'	Pieńko 19', Kurminowski 28' pen.	
2 August 2024	20:30	Górnik Zabrze	Away	0–1		Zahovič 83'	
10 August 2024	20:15	Stal Mielec	Home	1–0	Gorgon 84'		
17 August 2024	20:15	Widzew Łódź	Home	2–0	Bichakhchyan 21', Łukasiak 72'		
25 August 2024	17:30	Lech Poznań	Away	0–2		Sousa 54', Gholizadeh 77'	
1 September 2024	17:30	Śląsk Wrocław	Home	5–3	Ulvestad 9', Grosicki 21', Koulouris 41', 89', Gorgon 66'	Petkow 32', Musiolik 37', Petrow 81'	
14 September 2024	17:30	Cracovia	Away	1–2	Borges 72'	Maigaard 20', Ghiță 90'	
20 September 2024	20:30	Legia Warsaw	Home	1–0	Gorgon 67'		
27 September 2024	18:00	GKS Katowice	Away	1–3	Gorgon 90+3'	Jędrych 33', Bergier 90', Marzec 90+6'	
6 October 2024	17:30	Piast Gliwice	Home	1–0	Koulouris 90+7'		
20 October 2024	17:30	Raków Częstochowa	Away	0–1		Rodin 90+13'	
25 October 2024	20:30	Puszcza Niepołomice	Home	2–1	Koulouris 36', Wahlqvist 71'	Kosidis 82'	
2 November 2024	17:30	Motor Lublin	Away	2–4	Grosicki 37', Bichakhchyan 63'	Król 8', 38', Mráz 28', Ndiaye 75'	
8 November 2024	20:30	Radomiak Radom	Home	0–1		Paulo Henrique 37'	
23 November 2024	14:45	Lechia Gdańsk	Away	3–0	Koulouris 19', 40', 83' pen.		
1 December 2024	14:45	Jagiellonia Białystok	Home	1–1	Koulouris 14'	Imaz 54'	
9 December 2024	19:00	Korona Kielce	Away	0–0			
1 February 2025	20:15	Zagłębie Lubin	Home	1–0	Grosicki 73'		
7 February 2025	20:30	Górnik Zabrze	Home	3–0	Ulvestad 8', Grosicki 48', 61'		
16 February 2025	12:15	Stal Mielec	Away	2–1	Koulouris 54', Przyborek 65'	Matras 89'	
22 February 2025	17:30	Widzew Łódź	Away	4–0	Kurzawa 54', Koulouris 40' pen., 53', 63'		
1 March 2025	17:30	Lech Poznań	Home	0–3		Ishak 32', 68 pen., Pereira 85'	
7 March 2025	20:30	Śląsk Wrocław	Away	1–1	Al Hamlawi 49'	Koulouris 58'	
14 March 2025	20:30	Cracovia	Home	5–2	Ulvestad 45+2', 90+6', Kakabadze 45+7' o.g., Koulouris 82' pen., Ghiță 84' o.g.	Källman 5' pen., 11'	
28 March 2025	20:30	Legia Warsaw	Away	0–0			
6 April 2025	17:30	GKS Katowice	Home	4–0	Koulouris 45+6' pen., 49', 87' Ulvestad 82'		
13 April 2025	14:45	Piast Gliwice	Away	1–2	Koulouris 90+3'	Kostadinov 26', Chrapek 51'	
19 April 2025	20:15	Raków Częstochowa	Home	1–0	Wahlqvist 37'		
25 April 2025	18:00	Puszcza Niepołomice	Away	5–4	Koulouris 5', 45', 60' pen., 90+3', Wędrychowski 69'	Mroziński 39', Szymonowicz 46', Klimek 51', 54'	
10 May 2025	14:45	Radomiak Radom	Away	0–2		Burch 2', Perotti 90+3'	
14 May 2025	20:30	Motor Lublin	Home	3–0	Grosicki 43', 52', Koulouris 76'		
17 May 2025	14:45	Lechia Gdańsk	Home	3–3	Olsson 32' o.g., Ulvestad 45', Koulouris 72'	Sezonienko 6', Zhelizko 39', Głogowski 90'	
24 May 2025	17:30	Jagiellonia Białystok	Away	1–1	Koulouris 32'	Wojtuszek 71'	

=== Polish Cup ===
Polish Cup match details
Round	Date	Time	Opponent	Venue	Result F–A	Scorers		Ref.
Round	Date	Time	Opponent	Venue	Result F–A	Pogoń Szczecin	Opponent	Ref.
First round	24 September 2024	20:30	Stal Rzeszów	Away	3–0	Kurzawa 24', Koulouris 71', Bichakhchyan 85'		
Round of 32	29 October 2024	15:00	Odra Opole	Away	1–0 (a.e.t.)	Grosicki 92'		
Round of 16	4 December 2024	21:00	Zagłębie Lubin	Home	4–3	Grosicki 19', Bichakhchyan 24', Gorgon 51', Paryzek 88'	Pieńko 44' pen., Kurminowski 62', 77'	
Quarter-final	26 February 2025	18:00	Piast Gliwice	Home	2–0 (a.e.t.)	Koulouris 106', Grosicki 120+3'		
Semi-final	1 April 2025	18:30	Puszcza Niepołomice	Away	3–0	Koutris 5', Wahlqvist 36', Koulouris 53'		
Final	2 May 2025	16:00	Legia Warsaw	Neutral	3–4	Lončar 41', Koulouris 67', Smoliński 90+5'	Luquinhas 13', Morishita 46', Shkuryn 64', Vinagre 85'	
