= Efthymis Koulouris =

Greek footballer (born 1996)

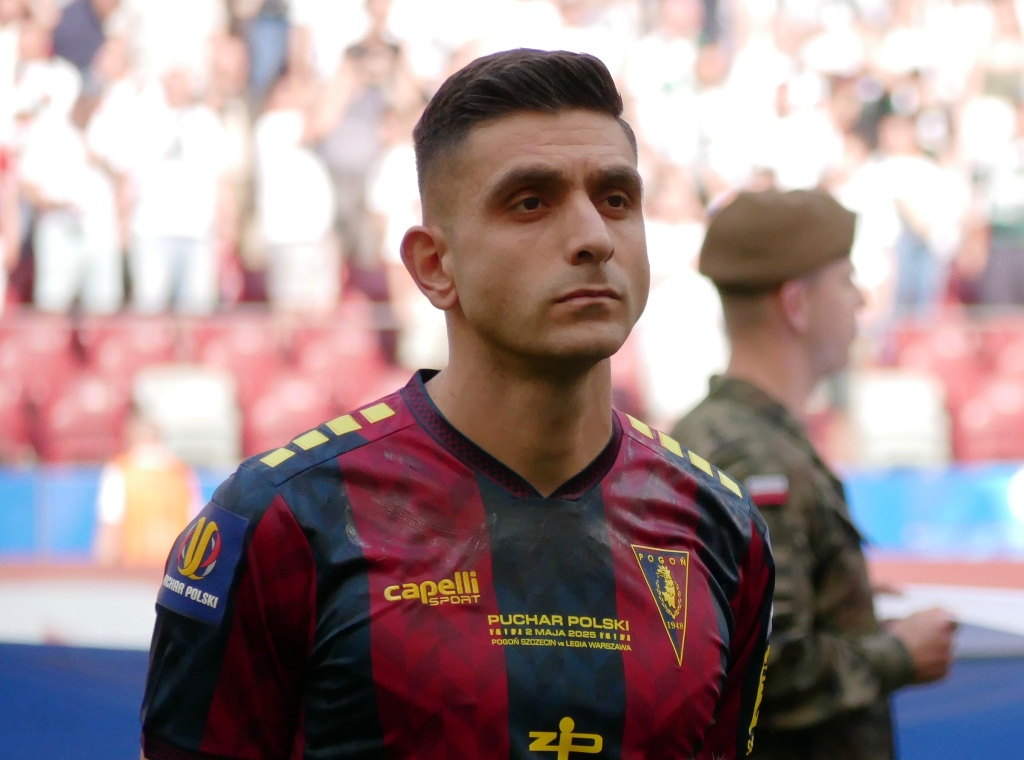

Personal information
- Full name: Efthymios Koulouris
- Date of birth: 6 March 1996 (age 30)
- Place of birth: Skydra, Greece
- Height: 1.84 m (6 ft 0 in)
- Position: Striker

Team information
- Current team: Wieczysta Kraków
- Number: 9

Youth career
- 2005–2013: PAOK

Senior career*
Years	Team	Apps	(Gls)
2013–2019	PAOK	55	(9)
2015–2016	→ Anorthosis (loan)	22	(6)
2018–2019	→ Atromitos (loan)	28	(19)
2019–2021	Toulouse	32	(4)
2021–2022	Atromitos	32	(14)
2022–2023	LASK	14	(1)
2023	→ Alanyaspor (loan)	10	(3)
2023–2025	Pogoń Szczecin	70	(43)
2025–2026	Al-Ula	36	(23)
2026–	Wieczysta Kraków	7	(0)

International career
2011	Greece U17	8	(3)
2012	Greece U18	4	(1)
2013–2015	Greece U19	22	(4)
2016–2018	Greece U21	18	(7)
2018–2022	Greece	18	(0)
- * Club domestic league appearances and goals as of 16 October 2026

Efthymis Koulouris (Greek: Ευθύμης Κουλούρης, born 6 March 1996) is a Greek professional footballer who plays as a striker for Ekstraklasa club Wieczysta Kraków.

Koulouris began his career with PAOK, and spent time on loan at Cypriot First Division club Anorthosis and at Atromitos, with whom he was top scorer in the 2018–19 Super League. He joined Ligue 1 club Toulouse in 2019. Koulouris represented his country from under-17 to under-21 levels before making his senior debut in 2018.

== Club career ==
=== PAOK ===
Koulouris was born in Skydra. He began his football career in PAOK's youth system as a young boy and came through the ranks, winning titles at under-17 and under-20 levels. He made his first-team debut as a 17-year-old on 13 February 2014 in the Greek Cup quarter-final against Apollon Smyrnis. With his side already 4–0 up on aggregate, Koulouris replaced Stefanos Athanasiadis at half-time in the second leg and scored twice. Three days later, he made his Super League debut as a late substitute against Asteras Tripolis.

==== Loan to Anorthosis ====
In the summer of 2015, Koulouris signed for Cypriot First Division club Anorthosis, on loan for the season. On 28 October, he scored six times as Anorthosis beat Second Division opponents Elpida Xylofagou 9–0 in the Cypriot Cup. His first league goal came four days later: having entered the match away to Pafos as an 88th-minute substitute, he scored with a header that secured a 2–1 win. Koulouris finished the season with seven goals in the Cup, which made him the top scorer in that season's competition, and six in the 2015–16 First Division.

==== Return to PAOK ====
He returned to PAOK for the 2016–17 season. On 19 September 2016, he scored both goals in a 2–1 away win against Asteras Tripolis and was elected MVP of the game. Koulouris established himself as a regular first-team player with 32 appearances in all competitions, and was voted Players' Young Player of the Year by his teammates.

On 29 September 2017, Koulouris agreed to a contract extension with PAOK until the summer of 2021. On 10 December, he scored in a 4–0 home win against rivals Panathinaikos. On 8 February 2018, he scored his first goal of the 2017–18 Greek Cup to help his club reach the semi-finals with a 5–1 aggregate win against Atromitos.

==== Loan to Atromitos ====
Koulouris joined Atromitos on loan for the 2018–19 season. On 26 July 2018, in his first competitive game, he scored a late goal against Dynamo Brest in the Europa League second qualifying round as Atromitos came back from 4–0 down to lose the first leg 4–3; they conceded a late equaliser in the second leg after Koulours had a goal disallowed and were eliminated. On 25 August, in his first Super League game of the 2018–19 season, he scored a brace sealing a 2–1 away win against rivals Panetolikos. On 7 October, he scored with a header sealing a 1–0 home win game against PAS Giannina. On 22 October, he scored a brace, including a late winner, in a 3–2 home win against Asteras Tripolis. Six days later he scored in a 2–2 away draw against Panionios. On 31 October, he scored in a 6–1 away Greek Cup win against Iraklis. On 25 November, he scored from the rebound after Azer Bušuladžić's shot was parried to give Atromitos the lead at home to Olympiacos, but they went on to lose 2–1. On 9 December, he scored a brace and gave an assist in a 4–2 home win against Aris Thessaloniki. He scored a hat trick against Apollon Smyrnis in the Greek Cup round of 16. On 27 January 2019, he opened the scoring in a 2–1 away loss against Lamia. On 31 January, he opened the score in an away 1–1 draw against OFI. On 31 March, he opened the score in a 2–1 away loss against Olympiacos.

His 18th goal of the season on 14 April in a 2–0 win away to Aris Thessaloniki confirmed that Atromitos would finish in fourth place. His 19th and last goal of the Super League season came the following week in a 2–0 win at home to Panathinaikos, a tally which made him the top scorer for the season. He became the first Atromitos player to finish as leading scorer in the top flight, and the first player to do so while on loan from another Greek club. He was the third player of Greek nationality to achieve the feat in the Super League era and, at 23 years and 60 days, the third-youngest player of all time to do so in the top division.

=== Toulouse ===
On 22 June 2019, Koulouris signed a four-year contract with French club Toulouse. L'Équipe reported the fee to be in the region of €3.5 million plus add-ons. In his first Ligue 1 game, away to Brest, he scored a somewhat fortunate 89th-minute equaliser. His third goal of the season was an even later equaliser, after 96 minutes of the match away to Metz on 28 September.

On 22 June 2021, he was released from the club, two years earlier than the contract he had signed, which was until the summer of 2023.

=== Return to Atromitos ===
On 22 June 2021, only a few hours after he got released by Toulouse, he return to his previous club Atromitos, having signed a two-year contract. On 21 November 2021, Atromitos prevailed 2–0 over rivals PAOK, with Koulouris being the main protagonist, as he opened the scoring in the 45th minute after an assist from Juan Muñiz, while in the 68th minute he scored with a penalty kick. He was voted man of the match for his performance. On 4 December 2021, he scored a brace in a 4–1 home win game against Apollon Smyrnis, sealing a vital win in his club effort to avoid relegation.

On 10 February 2022, he scored a brace sealing a vital 3–1 win against Lamia, in his club effort to avoid relegation. On 28 February, he scored a brace sealing a vital 2–0 away win against Apollon Smyrnis in his club effort to avoid relegation. A week later, he scored with a header at the last minute of the game sealing a vital 2–1 home win game against Volos.

=== LASK ===
On 5 July 2022, LASK officially announced the signing of Koulouris on a three-year contract, for a fee over €1,000,000 plus bonuses, making him the most profitable sale of Atromitos. He made his competitive debut for the club on the first matchday of the 2022–23 season, coming on as a substitute in the 61st minute for goalscorer Marin Ljubičić in a 3–1 home win against Austria Klagenfurt.

=== Pogoń Szczecin ===
After returning from a loan spell at Turkish club Alanyaspor, on 1 July 2023 Koulouris joined Polish Ekstraklasa side Pogoń Szczecin on a three-year contract. On 21 July, Koulouris scored on his debut in a 1–0 league win over Warta Poznań. On 12 April 2024, he scored his first hat-trick at Pogoń in just twelve minutes in a 5–0 win against Ruch Chorzów. He finished the 2023–24 season with 18 goals in 43 appearances in all competitions.

Koulouris netted his first hat-trick of the 2024–25 campaign on 23 November 2024 in a 3–0 win against Lechia Gdańsk. Six matchdays later, on 22 February 2025, Koulouris scored another hat-trick in a 4–0 victory over Widzew Łódź. On 6 April 2025, he netted his 4th Ekstraklasa hat-trick in a 4–0 win against GKS Katowice. Nineteen days later, Koulouris scored four goals in a 5–4 comeback win over Puszcza Niepołomice. With 28 goals scored, he finished the season as the league's top scorer, and was subsequently named the Ekstraklasa Forward and Player of the Season.

=== Al-Ula ===
On 29 August 2025, Koulouris moved to Saudi First Division League newcomers Al-Ula for a reported transfer fee of €4 million.

=== Wieczysta Kraków ===
On 20 August 2026, Koulouris returned to Poland to join Ekstraklasa newcomers Wieczysta Kraków on a free transfer. He signed a two-year contract, with an option for a third.

== International career ==
On 16 March 2018, Michael Skibbe called up Koulouris in the Greece national team for the friendly match against Switzerland on 23 March 2018. On 23 March 2018, he made his debut with the Greece national team in a 1–0 home loss against Switzerland as a late substitute.

== Private life ==
In June 2024, he married Kallia Garganouraki.

== Career statistics ==
=== Club ===
As of match played 23 May 2026

Appearances and goals by club, season and competition
Club	Season	League			National cup (Note: Includes Greek Cup, Cypriot Cup, Coupe de France, Austrian Cup, Polish Cup, King's Cup)		League cup (Note: Includes Coupe de la Ligue)		Continental		Total	
Club	Season	Division	Apps	Goals	Apps	Goals	Apps	Goals	Apps	Goals	Apps	Goals
PAOK	2013–14	Super League Greece	9	1	2	2	—		—		11	3
PAOK	2014–15	Super League Greece	14	0	1	0	—		—		15	0
PAOK	2015–16	Super League Greece	—		—		—		4 (Note: Appearance(s) in UEFA Europa League)	0	4	0
PAOK	2016–17	Super League Greece	19	5	7	1	—		6 (Note: Two appearances in UEFA Champions League, four appearances in UEFA Europa League)	0	32	6
PAOK	2017–18	Super League Greece	13	3	7	2	—		1	0	21	5
PAOK	Total		55	9	17	5	—		11	0	83	14
Anorthosis (loan)	2015–16	Cypriot First Division	22	6	4	7	—		—		26	13
Atromitos (loan)	2018–19	Super League Greece	28	19	5	5	—		2	1	35	25
Toulouse	2019–20	Ligue 1	24	4	1	0	1	0	—		26	4
Toulouse	2020–21	Ligue 2	8	0	5	0	—		—		13	0
Toulouse	Total		32	4	6	0	1	0	—		39	4
Atromitos	2021–22	Super League Greece	32	14	1	0	—		—		33	14
LASK	2022–23	Austrian Bundesliga	14	1	2	0	—		—		16	1
Alanyaspor (loan)	2022–23	Süper Lig	10	3	—		—		—		10	3
Pogoń Szczecin	2023–24	Ekstraklasa	34	12	5	2	—		4 (Note: Appearances in UEFA Europa Conference League)	4	43	18
Pogoń Szczecin	2024–25	Ekstraklasa	32	28	5	3	—		—		37	31
Pogoń Szczecin	2025–26	Ekstraklasa	4	3	—		—		—		4	3
Pogoń Szczecin	Total		70	43	10	5	—		4	4	84	52
Al-Ula	2025–26	Saudi First Division League	36	23	4	3	—		—		40	26
Wieczysta Kraków	2026–27	Ekstraklasa	0	0	0	0	—		—		0	0
Career total			299	122	49	25	1	0	17	5	366	152

=== International ===
Appearances and goals by national team and year
National team	Year	Apps	Goals
Greece
Greece	2018	5	0
Greece	2019	10	0
Greece	2020	2	0
Greece	2021	0	0
Greece	2022	1	0
Total		18	0

== Honours ==
PAOK

- Greek Football Cup: 2016–17, 2017–18

Individual

- Super League Greece top scorer: 2018–19
- Super League Greece Team of the Season: 2018–19
- Atromitos Player of the Season: 2021–22
- Ekstraklasa top scorer: 2024–25
- Ekstraklasa Player of the Season: 2024–25
- Ekstraklasa Forward of the Season: 2024–25
- Ekstraklasa Player of the Month: April 2025
