= Moussa Kamara =

Gambian footballer (born 1999)

Personal information
- Full name: Moussa Kamara
- Date of birth: 3 April 1999 (age 27)
- Place of birth: Paris, France
- Height: 1.90 m (6 ft 3 in)
- Position: Centre-back

Team information
- Current team: Al-Naft SC

Youth career
- 2006–2014: Montfermeil FC
- 2012–2014: INF Clairefontaine
- 2014–2017: Toulouse

Senior career*
Years	Team	Apps	(Gls)
2017–2019	Toulouse B	25	(3)
2020	Real Avilés	10	(0)
2020–2021	Balzan	20	(1)
2021–2022	Jammerbugt	20	(0)
2022	KF Ferizaj	10	(0)
2023–	Al-Naft SC	15	(2)

International career
2019	Gambia	1	(0)
- * Club domestic league appearances and goals as of 20 April 2023.

Moussa Kamara (born 3 April 1999) is a professional footballer who plays as centre-back for Al-Naft SC in the Iraqi Premier League. Born in France, he has represented the Gambia national team.

== Club career ==
Born in Paris, Kamara started in Montfermeil FC, and joined the youth academy of Toulouse in 2014.

On 18 August 2021, Kamara joined newly promoted Danish 1st Division club Jammerbugt FC on a deal until the end of 2021. He left again at the end of the season.

== International career ==
Kamara was born in France and is of Gambian descent. He debuted for the Gambia national football team in a friendly 1–0 win over Morocco on 12 June 2019.
