= Mathieu Gonçalves =

French professional footballer (born 2001)

Personal information
- Date of birth: 8 June 2001 (age 25)
- Place of birth: Paris 17e, France
- Height: 1.78 m (5 ft 10 in)
- Position: Defender

Youth career
- 2007–2012: Gagnac
- 2012–2015: Blagnac FC
- 2015–2019: Toulouse

Senior career*
Years	Team	Apps	(Gls)
2017–2021	Toulouse II	20	(0)
2019–2021	Toulouse	5	(0)
2020–2021	→ Le Mans (loan)	14	(0)
2021–2023	Xamax	23	(0)

International career^{‡}
2016–2017	France U16	12	(0)
2017	France U17	2	(0)
2018	France U18	1	(0)
2019–2020	France U19	4	(0)
- * Club domestic league appearances and goals as of 19 June 2023 ‡ National team caps and goals as of 25 February 2020

Mathieu Gonçalves (born 8 June 2001) is a French professional footballer who plays as a defender.

== Career ==
Gonçalves joined the Toulouse FC academy at U15 level, and signed his first professional contract with the club in June 2018. He made his professional debut for Toulouse in a 4–0 Ligue 1 loss to Paris Saint-Germain F.C. on 25 August 2019.

On 30 September 2020 Gonçalves joined Championnat National side Le Mans FC on loan until the end of the 2020–21 season.

On 8 July 2021, he signed a two-year contract with Xamax in Switzerland.

== Personal life ==
Born in France, Gonçalves is of Portuguese descent.
