= 2022–23 En Avant Guingamp season =

En Avant Guingamp
2022–23 season
- President: Frédéric Legrand
- Head coach: Stéphane Dumont
- Stadium: Stade de Roudourou
- Ligue 2: 6th
- Coupe de France: Eighth round
- Top goalscorer: League: Gaëtan Courtet (10); All: Gaëtan Courtet (11)
Home colours	Away colours

The 2022–23 season was the 111th in the history of En Avant Guingamp and their fourth consecutive season in the second division. The club participated in Ligue 2 and the Coupe de France.

== Players ==
As of 28 November 2022.

Note: Flags indicate national team as defined under FIFA eligibility rules; some limited exceptions apply. Players may hold more than one non-FIFA nationality.

No.	Pos.	Nation	Player
2	DF	FRA	Baptiste Roux
3	DF	FRA	Arthur Vitelli
4	MF	FRA	Dylan Louiserre
5	DF	FRA	Hady Camara
6	MF	FRA	Tristan Muyumba
7	DF	SEN	Donatien Gomis
8	MF	MLI	Souleymane Diarra
9	FW	MAR	Amine El Ouazzani
10	MF	FRA	Mehdi Merghem
11	DF	FRA	Stephen Quemper
12	MF	CGO	Warren Tchimbembé (on loan from Metz)
15	DF	FRA	Vincent Manceau
16	GK	FRA	Enzo Basilio
17	MF	FRA	Théo Le Normand

No.	Pos.	Nation	Player
18	FW	FRA	Gaëtan Courtet
19	DF	CMR	Félix Eboa Eboa
21	FW	BEL	Baptiste Guillaume
22	FW	ALG	Mehdi Baaloudj
23	DF	FRA	Taylor Luvambo
24	DF	FRA	Pierre Lemonnier
25	MF	FRA	Jules Gaudin
26	DF	FRA	Matthis Riou
27	DF	COD	Maxime Sivis
28	MF	FRA	Maxime Barthelmé
29	MF	FRA	Jérémy Livolant
30	GK	FRA	Dominique Youfeigane
—	DF	FRA	Loïc Mbe Soh (on loan from Nottingham Forest)

=== Out on loan ===
Note: Flags indicate national team as defined under FIFA eligibility rules; some limited exceptions apply. Players may hold more than one non-FIFA nationality.

No. / Pos. / Nation / Player; — / GK / FRA / Hugo Barbet (on loan to Borgo until 30 June 2023)	No. / Pos. / Nation / Player; — / DF / FRA / Sikou Niakaté (on loan to Braga until 30 June 2023)

== Transfers ==
=== In ===
Pos.	Player	Transferred from	Fee	Date	Source
DF	(France) Vincent Manceau	(France) Angers	Free	21 July 2022	
DF	(France) Loïc Mbe Soh	(England) Nottingham Forest	Loan	23 January 2023	
MF	(France) Théo Le Normand	(France) Avranches	Loan return	30 January 2023	

=== Out ===
Pos.	Player	Transferred to	Fee	Date	Source
FW	(Senegal) Yannick Gomis	(Cyprus) Aris Limassol	Free	1 July 2022	
MF	(Comoros) Youssouf M'Changama	(France) Auxerre	Undisclosed	1 July 2022	
DF	(France) Sikou Niakaté	(Portugal) Braga	Loan	1 July 2022	

== Pre-season and friendlies ==
Win Draw Loss Fixtures

1 July 2022 Friendly	Guingamp (France)	3–1	(France) Niort	Ploufragan
17:00 CEST (UTC+2)	Le Normand 14'; Baaloudj 24'; Luvambo 26'		Conté 63'	Stadium: Centre Technique Régional Henri Guérin – terrain 1

6 July 2022 Friendly	Guingamp (France)	3–0	(France) Avranches	Pabu
17:00 CEST (UTC+2)	Luvambo 10'; Livolant 50'; Guillaume 70'			Stadium: Complexe Sportif Akademi EAG 4

9 July 2022 Friendly	Laval (France)	1–2	(France) Guingamp	Dinan
17:00 CEST (UTC+2)	Durbant 42'		Lemonnier 54'; Baaloudj 63'	Stadium: Stade du Clos Gastel

13 July 2022 Friendly	Nantes (France)	0–1	(France) Guingamp	La Baule-Escoublac
16:00 CEST (UTC+2)			Livolant 86'	Stadium: Stade Moreau Défarges

16 July 2022 Friendly	Concarneau (France)	1–0	(France) Guingamp	Concarneau
19:00 CEST (UTC+2)	Lebeau 55'			Stadium: Stade Guy Piriou

23 July 2022 Friendly	Guingamp (France)	2–0	(France) Brest	Guingamp
17:00 CEST (UTC+2)	Guillaume 54', 66'			Stadium: Stade du Roudourou

9 December 2022 Friendly	Guingamp (France)	4–0	(Bolivia) Always Ready	Guingamp
16:30 CET (UTC+1)				Stadium: Stade du Roudourou

13 December 2022 Friendly	Le Havre (France)	1–2	(France) Guingamp	Avranches
14:30 CET (UTC+1)				Stadium: Stade René Fenouillère

== Competitions ==
=== Overall record ===
Competition	First match	Last match	Starting round	Final position	Record							
Competition	First match	Last match	Starting round	Final position	Pld	W	D	L	GF	GA	GD	Win %
Ligue 2	30 July 2022	2 June 2023	Matchday 1	6th	38	15	10	13	51	46	+5	39.47
Coupe de France	30 October 2022	19 November 2022	Seventh round	Eighth round	2	1	1	0	4	2	+2	50.00
Total					40	16	11	13	55	48	+7	40.00

Source: Soccerway

=== Ligue 2 ===
==== League table ====
Pos	Team	Pld	W	D	L	GF	GA	GD	Pts
4	Bastia	38	17	9	12	52	45	+7	60
5	Caen	38	16	11	11	52	43	+9	59
6	Guingamp	38	15	10	13	51	46	+5	55
7	Paris FC	38	15	10	13	45	43	+2	55
8	Saint-Étienne	38	15	11	12	63	57	+6	53 (Note: Saint-Étienne were deducted three points for a pitch invasion during their relegation play-off the previous season.)

Source: Ligue 2
Rules for classification: 1) Points; 2) Goal difference; 3) Number of goals scored; 4) Head-to-head goal difference; 5) Fair play points

==== Results summary ====
Overall								Home						Away					
Pld	W	D	L	GF	GA	GD	Pts	W	D	L	GF	GA	GD	W	D	L	GF	GA	GD
38	15	10	13	51	46	+5	55	7	4	8	26	24	+2	8	6	5	25	22	+3

Source: Ligue 2

==== Results by round ====
Round	1	2	3	4	5	6	7	8	9	10	11	12	13	14	15	16	17	18	19	20	21	22
Ground	H	A	H	A	A	H	H	A	H	A	H	A	H	A	H	A	H	A	H	A	H	A
Result	W	W	D	L	W	L	D	W	W	D	L	L	D	D	L	W	L	D	L	W	L	
Position	1	1	1	7	3	7	9	6	5	5	7	7	8	8	11	8	12	12	13	10	11	

Updated to match(es) played on 26 May 2023. Source: Ligue 2
A = Away; H = Home; W = Win; D = Draw; L = Loss

==== Matches ====
The league fixtures were announced on 17 June 2022.

30 July 2022 1	Guingamp	4–0	Pau	Guingamp
19:00 CEST (UTC+2)	Livolant 22'; Gaudin 32', 52'; Merghem 34'	Report		Stadium: Stade de Roudourou; Attendance: 7,305; Referee: Mikaël Lesage

6 August 2022 2	Laval	1–2	Guingamp	Laval
19:00 CEST (UTC+2)	Gonçalves 5'	Report	Barthelmé 56'; Livolant 74'	Stadium: Stade Francis Le Basser; Attendance: 8,813; Referee: Faouzi Benchabane

13 August 2022 3	Guingamp	0–0	Paris FC	Guingamp
15:00 CEST (UTC+2)		Report		Stadium: Stade de Roudourou; Attendance: 10,114; Referee: Guillaume Paradis

20 August 2022 4	Caen	4–1	Guingamp	Bordeaux
19:00 CEST (UTC+2)	Ntim 18'; Mendy 19'; Essende 52'; Jeannot 76' (pen.)	Report	Barthelmé 6'	Stadium: Matmut Atlantique; Attendance: 14,120; Referee: Nicolas Rainville

27 August 2022 5	Bordeaux	0–1	Guingamp	Bordeaux
15:00 CEST (UTC+2)		Report	Livolant 6'	Stadium: Matmut Atlantique; Attendance: 17,609; Referee: Aurélien Petit

30 August 2022 6	Guingamp	1–2	Sochaux	Guingamp
20:45 CEST (UTC+2)	Lemonnier 21'	Report	N'Dour 37'; Doumbia 80'	Stadium: Stade de Roudourou; Attendance: 8,136; Referee: Pierre Legat

12 September 2022 8	Metz	3–6	Guingamp	Metz
20:45 CEST (UTC+2)	Manceau 2' (o.g.); Jallow 10', 16'; Kouyaté (yellow card) 31' (yellow-red card) 31'; Oukidja (red card) 45+3'; Jean Jacques (red card) 56'; Udol (yellow card) 60'; Niane (red card) 90+1'	Report	Livolant (penalty scored) 9', 88'; Quemper 45+1'; Courtet (penalty scored) 45+7'; Roux (yellow card) 51'; Kiankaulua (yellow card) 66'; Louiserre 69'; Tchimbembé 85'	Stadium: Stade Saint-Symphorien; Attendance: 11,898; Referee: Pierre Gaillouste

17 September 2022 9	Guingamp	2–1	Saint-Étienne	Guingamp
15:00 CEST (UTC+2)	Livolant (yellow card) 40', (goal) 59'; Courtet 45+2', (yellow card) 61'	Report	Briançon (yellow card) 11'; Giraudon (yellow card) 54'; Wadji (yellow card) 65'; Lobry 81'	Stadium: Stade de Roudourou; Attendance: 11,645; Referee: Benjamin Lepaysant

1 October 2022 10	Niort	0–0	Guingamp	Niort
19:00 CEST (UTC+2)	Kaboré (yellow card) 5'; Conté (yellow card) 40'; Merdji (yellow card) 46'	Report	Muyumba (yellow card) 44'; Louiserre (yellow card) 62'	Stadium: Stade René Gaillard; Attendance: 2,184; Referee: Abdelatif Kherradji

4 October 2022 7	Guingamp	0–0	Rodez	Guingamp
20:45 CEST (UTC+2)	Gaudin (yellow card) 68'	Report	Danger (yellow card) 19'; Chougrani (yellow card) 64'; Pembélé (yellow card) 90+2'	Stadium: Stade de Roudourou; Attendance: 7,737; Referee: Olivier Thual
Note: Match postponed from 2 Sept. due to travel difficulties experienced by the Rodez squad.

8 October 2022 11	Guingamp	0–4	Annecy	Guingamp
19:00 CEST (UTC+2)	Gaudin (yellow card) 64'; Barthelmé (yellow card) 71'	Report	Mendy (yellow card) 13'; Billemaz (yellow card) 30'; Kashi (yellow card) 34', (goal) 87'; Sahi 36'; Pajot (yellow card) 65'; Testud 82'; Spano 90+1'	Stadium: Stade de Roudourou; Attendance: 6,473; Referee: Jérémy Stinat

15 October 2022 12	Valenciennes	1–0	Guingamp	Valenciennes
19:00 CEST (UTC+2)	Cuffaut 36'; Berthomier (yellow card) 72'	Report	Muyumba (yellow card) 35'	Stadium: Stade du Hainaut; Attendance: 5,761; Referee: Aurélien Petit

22 October 2022 13	Guingamp	1–1	Bastia	Guingamp
19:00 CEST (UTC+2)	Kaïboué 86' (o.g.)	Report	Guidi (yellow card) 21'; Ndiaye (red card) 65'; Tavares (yellow card) 66'; Talal 78'; Kaïboué (yellow card) 80'	Stadium: Stade de Roudourou; Attendance: 9,827; Referee: Antoine Valnet

5 November 2022 14	Dijon	1–1	Guingamp	Dijon
19:00 CEST (UTC+2)	Ngouyamsa (yellow card) 7'; Touré 52'; Congré (yellow card) 76'	Report	Quemper (yellow card) 9'; Roux (yellow card) 41'; Luvambo 45+2'; Vitelli (yellow card) 50'; Manceau (yellow card) 70'	Stadium: Stade Gaston Gérard; Attendance: 6,837; Referee: William Toulliou

12 November 2022 15	Guingamp	0–1	Le Havre	Guingamp
19:00 CET (UTC+1)	Livolant (yellow card) 3'; Louiserre (yellow card) 59'; Gaudin (yellow card) 82'	Report	Alioui 87'; El Hajjam (yellow card) 90+3'	Stadium: Stade de Roudourou; Attendance: 10,251; Referee: Azzedine Souifi

26 December 2022 16	Nîmes	1–2	Guingamp	Nîmes
21:00 CET (UTC+1)	Tchokounté (penalty scored) 30'; N'Guessan (yellow card) 68'; Benezet (yellow card) 90'	Report	Livolant (penalty scored) 22', (yellow card) 30'; Courtet (penalty scored) 90+2'	Stadium: Stade des Costières; Attendance: 5,063; Referee: William Toulliou

30 December 2022 17	Guingamp	0–2	Quevilly-Rouen	Guingamp
21:00 CET (UTC+1)	Gomis (yellow card) 83'	Report	Bangré 31'; Sissoko (yellow card) 37'; Sidibé (yellow card) 45+1'; Mafouta 48'	Stadium: Stade de Roudourou; Attendance: 9,894; Referee: Rémi Landry

10 January 2023 18	Amiens	1–1	Guingamp	Amiens
19:00 CET (UTC+1)	Leautey (yellow card) 71'; Arokodare 90'	Report	El Ouazzani 47'; Muyumba (yellow card) 61'	Stadium: Stade de la Licorne; Attendance: 6,064; Referee: Alexandre Perreau Niel

13 January 2023 19	Guingamp	2–4	Grenoble	Guingamp
21:00 CET (UTC+1)	El Ouazzani 2'; S. Diarra (yellow card) 24'; Quemper (yellow card) 39'; Guillaume (yellow card) 51', (goal) 57'	Report	Sanyang (yellow card) 17'; Tell 43', (yellow card) 56', (goal) 89'; Phaëton 48'; M. Diarra (yellow card) 75'; Correa 83'	Stadium: Stade de Roudourou; Attendance: 6,818; Referee: Faouzi Benchabane

28 January 2022 20	Rodez	0–1	Guingamp	Rodez
19:00 CET (UTC+1)	Vandenabeele (yellow card) 45+3'; Depres (yellow card) 45+3'; Senaya (yellow card) 63'	Report	Guillaume 58', (yellow card) 72'	Stadium: Stade Paul-Lignon; Attendance: 2,233; Referee: Guillaume Paradis

31 January 2022 21	Guingamp	1–2	Nîmes	Guingamp
20:45 CET (UTC+1)	Mbe Soh 33'; Barthelmé (yellow card) 49'; Muyumba (yellow card) 61'	Report	Benezet 63'; Lopy (yellow card) 76'; Koné 90+4', (yellow card) 90+5'	Stadium: Stade de Roudourou; Attendance: 7,916; Referee: Antoine Valnet

3 February 2023 22	Quevilly-Rouen	2–0	Guingamp	Le Petit-Quevilly
20:45 CET (UTC+1)	Bangré 22', 68'; Jung (yellow card) 56'	Report	Diarra (yellow card) 15'; Sivis (yellow card) 89'	Stadium: Stade Robert Diochon; Attendance: 3,143; Referee: Azzédine Souifi

11 February 2022 23	Guingamp	3–1	Valenciennes	Guingamp
19:00 CET (UTC+1)	Gaudin (yellow card) 30'; Gomis 41'; Guillaume 60'; El Ouazzani 90'	Report	Debuchy 66'	Stadium: Stade de Roudourou; Attendance: 7,052; Referee: Rémi Landry

18 February 2023 24	Bastia	1–1	Guingamp	Furiani
19:00 CET (UTC+1)	Kaïboué 32'; Van Den Kerkhof (yellow card) 48'	Report	Gaudin (yellow card) 36'; Courtet 80'	Stadium: Stade Armand-Cesari; Attendance: 8,750; Referee: Alexandre Perreau Niel

25 February 2023 25	Guingamp	1–2	Caen	Guingamp
19:00 CET (UTC+1)	Muyumba (yellow card) 53'; El Ouazzani 54'; Quemper (yellow card) 62'	Report	Court 19', (yellow card) 90+2'; Kyeremeh 42'; Deminguet (yellow card) 79'	Stadium: Stade de Roudourou; Attendance: 8,060; Referee: Olivier Thual

4 March 2023 26	Paris FC	1–2	Guingamp	Paris
19:00 CET (UTC+1)	Lasne (yellow card) 20'; Guilavogui 47'; Chergui (yellow card) 63'	Report	Picard 26'; Guillaume 32'	Stadium: Stade Sébastien Charléty; Attendance: 2,300; Referee: Aurélien Petit

11 March 2023 27	Guingamp	2–0	Dijon	Guingamp
19:00 CET (UTC+1)	El Ouazzani 34'; Quemper (yellow card) 41'; Roux (yellow card) 55'; Siwe 85'	Report	Traoré (yellow card) 11' (yellow-red card) 25'; Allagbé (yellow card) 28'	Stadium: Stade de Roudourou; Attendance: 8,126; Referee: Rémi Landry

18 March 2023 28	Annecy	1–1	Guingamp	Annecy
19:00 CET (UTC+1)	Sahi 21'; Lajugie (red card) 77'	Report	Lajugie 23' (o.g.)	Stadium: Parc des Sports; Attendance: 6,134; Referee: Gaël Angoula

3 April 2023 29	Guingamp	0–1	Bourdeaux	Guingamp
20:45 CEST (UTC+2)	Gaudin (yellow card) 54'	Report	Fransérgio 21'; Gregersen (yellow card) 58'; Barbet (yellow card) 60'; Bokele (yellow card) 74'	Stadium: Stade de Roudourou; Attendance: 9,533; Referee: Antoine Valnet

8 April 2023 30	Le Havre	0–0	Guingamp	Le Havre
19:00 CEST (UTC+2)	Sangante (yellow card) 11'; Thiaré (yellow card) 69'; Targhalline (yellow card) 78'	Report	Sivis (yellow card) 4'	Stadium: Stade Océane; Attendance: 10,881; Referee: Pierre Legat

15 April 2023 31	Guingamp	3–1	Amiens	Guingamp
19:00 CEST (UTC+2)	Courtet 35'; Livolant 56'; Guillaume 73'	Report	Gélin (yellow card) 41'; Gomis 52'; Mendy (yellow card) 57'	Stadium: Stade de Roudourou; Attendance: 7,126; Referee: Abdelatif Kherradji

22 April 2023 32	Pau	2–1	Guingamp	Pau
19:00 CEST (UTC+2)	Saivet 14'; Begraoui 73'	Report	Picard 5'; Basilio (red card) 51'; Courtet (yellow card) 62'; Sivis (yellow card) 90+4'	Stadium: Nouste Camp; Attendance: 3,152; Referee: Azzédine Souifi

29 April 2023 33	Guingamp	3–1	Laval	Guingamp
19:00 CEST (UTC+2)	Livolant 4' (pen.); Roux (yellow card) 59'; Sivis 69'; Courtet 72'; Merghem (yellow card) 79'; Louiserre (yellow card) 81'	Report	Elisor 35'; B. Gonçalves (yellow card) 50'	Stadium: Stade de Roudourou; Attendance: 9,860; Referee: Rémi Landry

6 May 2023 34	Saint-Étienne	3–2	Guingamp	Saint-Étienne
19:00 CEST (UTC+2)	Moueffek 21'; Fomba (yellow card) 44'; Bamba (yellow card) 53'; Cafaro 82'; Wadji 88'	Report	El Ouazzani 12'; Sivis (yellow card) 43'; Courtet 45', (yellow card) 70'	Stadium: Stade Geoffroy-Guichard; Attendance: 25,002; Referee: Olivier Thual

13 May 2023 35	Sochaux	0–1	Guingamp	Montbéliard
19:00 CEST (UTC+2)	Ndiaye (yellow card) 34'; Makosso (yellow card) 90+7'	Report	Guillaume 61'; Sivis (yellow card) 77'; Picard (yellow card) 90'	Stadium: Stade Auguste Bonal; Attendance: 10,144; Referee: Guillaume Paradis

20 May 2023 36	Guingamp	1–1	Metz	Guingamp
19:00 CEST (UTC+2)	Courtet 60'	Report	Mikautadze 21'; N'Duquidi (yellow card) 41'; Kouao (yellow card) 90+4'	Stadium: Stade de Roudourou; Attendance: 9,163; Referee: Antoine Valnet

26 May 2023 37	Guingamp	2–0	Niort	Guingamp
20:45 CEST (UTC+2)	Courtet 31', 90+4'; Gaudin (yellow card) 86'	Report		Stadium: Stade de Roudourou; Attendance: 12,885; Referee: William Toulliou

2 June 2023 38	Grenoble	0–2	Guingamp	Grenoble
20:45 CEST (UTC+2)	Tourraine (yellow card) 13'; Sbaï (penalty missed) 24'; M. Diarra (yellow card) 67'	Report	El Ouazzani 11'; Guillaume 54'; Muyumba (yellow card) 74'	Stadium: Stade des Alpes; Attendance: 5,918; Referee: Guillaume Paradise

=== Coupe de France ===
30 October 2022 Seventh round	Auray FC	0–2	Guingamp	Vannes
14:00 CET		Report	Guillaume 11', 53'	Stadium: Stade de la Rabine; Referee: Pierre Retail

19 November 2022 Eighth round	Les Herbiers VF	2–2 (4–3 p)	Guingamp	Les Herbiers
18:00 CET	Matondo 30'; Daury 66'	Report	Courtet 24'; Louiserre 37'	Stadium: Stade Massabielle; Attendance: 3,523; Referee: Mikaël Lesage
