= 2021–22 En Avant Guingamp season =

Guingamp
2021–22 season
- President: Frédéric Legrand
- Head coach: Stéphane Dumont
- Stadium: Stade de Roudourou
- Ligue 2: 6th
- Coupe de France: Round of 64
- Top goalscorer: League: Frantzdy Pierrot (15); All: Frantzdy Pierrot (15)
Home colours	Away colours

The 2021–22 season was the 110th season in the existence of En Avant Guingamp and the club's third consecutive season in the second division of French football. In addition to the domestic league, Guingamp participated in this season's edition of the Coupe de France.

== Players ==
=== First-team squad ===
As of 5 February 2022.

Note: Flags indicate national team as defined under FIFA eligibility rules; some limited exceptions apply. Players may hold more than one non-FIFA nationality.

No.	Pos.	Nation	Player
1	GK	FRA	Hugo Barbet
2	MF	FRA	Baptiste Roux
3	DF	FRA	Yohan Bilingi
4	DF	BRA	Philipe Sampaio
5	DF	FRA	Hady Camara
6	MF	FRA	Tristan Muyumba
7	MF	FRA	El Hadji Ba
8	FW	GLP	Matthias Phaëton
9	FW	HAI	Frantzdy Pierrot
10	MF	COM	Youssouf M'Changama (captain)
11	MF	FRA	Louis Carnot
13	FW	SEN	Yannick Gomis
15	FW	FRA	Charles Abi (on loan from St-Étienne)

No.	Pos.	Nation	Player
16	GK	FRA	Enzo Basilio
18	MF	MLI	Souleymane Diarra
19	DF	CMR	Félix Eboa Eboa
20	FW	FRA	Yoann Cathline
21	MF	FRA	Mehdi Merghem
22	DF	FRA	Stephen Quemper
24	DF	FRA	Pierre Lemonnier
27	DF	COD	Maxime Sivis
28	MF	FRA	Maxime Barthelmé
29	MF	FRA	Jérémy Livolant
30	GK	FRA	Dominique Youfeigane
33	FW	FRA	Théo Le Normand

=== Out on loan ===
Note: Flags indicate national team as defined under FIFA eligibility rules; some limited exceptions apply. Players may hold more than one non-FIFA nationality.

No.	Pos.	Nation	Player
—	DF	MLI	Sikou Niakaté (on loan to Metz)
—	MF	FRA	Jules Gaudin (at Bastia-Borgo)

No.	Pos.	Nation	Player
—	FW	FRA	Ervin Taha (at Créteil)

== Pre-season and friendlies ==
Win Draw Loss

7 July 2021 Friendly	Caen (France)	1–1	(France) Guingamp	Avranches, France
18:00 CEST (UTC+2)				Stadium: Stade René Fenouillère

10 July 2021 Friendly	Guingamp (France)	2–2	(France) Brest	Paimpol, France
16:00 CEST (UTC+2)				Stadium: Stade Charles Boursier

14 July 2021 Friendly	Nantes (France)	1–0	(France) Guingamp	Pornic, France
17:00 CEST (UTC+2)	Emond 50'			Stadium: Stade du Val Saint-Martin

3 September 2021 Friendly	Brest (France)	2–4	(France) Guingamp	Brest, France
15:00 CEST (UTC+2)	Faussurier 61'; Faivre 86' (pen.)		Livolant 44'; Pierrot 45' (pen.); Gomis 83'; Carnot 90'	Stadium: Stade Francis-Le Blé

== Competitions ==
=== Overall record ===
Competition	First match	Last match	Starting round	Final position	Record							
Competition	First match	Last match	Starting round	Final position	Pld	W	D	L	GF	GA	GD	Win %
Ligue 2	24 July 2021	14 May 2022	Matchday 1	6th	38	15	13	10	52	48	+4	39.47
Coupe de France	13 November 2021	18 December 2021	Seventh round	Round of 64	3	2	0	1	11	3	+8	66.67
Total					41	17	13	11	63	51	+12	41.46

Source: Soccerway

=== Ligue 2 ===
==== League table ====
Pos	Team	Pld	W	D	L	GF	GA	GD	Pts	Promotion or Relegation
4	Paris FC	38	20	10	8	54	35	+19	70	Qualification to promotion play-offs
5	Sochaux	38	19	11	8	47	34	+13	68	Qualification to promotion play-offs
6	Guingamp	38	15	13	10	52	48	+4	58	
7	Caen	38	13	11	14	51	42	+9	50	
8	Le Havre	38	13	11	14	38	41	−3	50	

Source: Ligue 2
Rules for classification: 1) Points; 2) Goal difference; 3) Number of goals scored; 4) Head-to-head goal difference; 5) Fair play points

==== Results summary ====
Overall								Home						Away					
Pld	W	D	L	GF	GA	GD	Pts	W	D	L	GF	GA	GD	W	D	L	GF	GA	GD
38	15	13	10	52	48	+4	58	9	6	4	31	24	+7	6	7	6	21	24	−3

Source: Ligue 2

==== Results by round ====
Round	1	2	3	4	5	6	7	8	9	10	11	12	13	14	15	16	17	18	19	20	21	22	23	24	25	26	27	28	29	30	31	32	33	34	35	36	37	38
Ground	A	H	A	H	A	H	A	A	H	A	H	A	H	A	H	A	H	A	H	A	H	A	H	A	H	H	A	H	A	H	A	H	A	H	A	H	A	H
Result	D	D	D	L	W	D	W	L	L	D	W	L	W	D	L	L	W	L	W	D	D	L	D	W	D	W	L	D	D	W	W	L	W	W	D	W	W	W
Position	13	12	12	15	13	13	11	13	13	13	13	14	9	10	11	15	10	14	9	11	12	12	13	10	10	10	10	12	14	11	7	10	8	7	7	6	6	6

Source: Ligue 2
A = Away; H = Home; W = Win; D = Draw; L = Loss

==== Matches ====
The league fixtures were announced on 25 June 2021.

24 July 2021 1	Le Havre	0–0	Guingamp	Le Havre
20:00 CET (UTC+1)	Richardson (yellow card) 90'	Report	Lemonnier (yellow card) 23'; Sampaio (yellow card) 30'	Stadium: Stade Océane; Referee: Remi Landry

31 July 2021 2	Guingamp	1–1	Valenciennes	Guingamp
19:00 CET (UTC+1)	Diarra (yellow card) 4'; M'Changama (yellow card) 60'; Muyumba (yellow card) 63'; Sampaio (yellow card) 79', (goal) 90'	Report	Masson (yellow card) 10'; D'Almeida (yellow card) 24'; Robail 76'	Stadium: Stade de Roudourou; Referee: Mathieu Vernice

7 August 2021 3	Grenoble	0–0	Guingamp	Grenoble
19:00 CEST (UTC+2)	de Iriondo (yellow card) 65'; Néry (yellow card) 79'	Report	Bilingi (yellow card) 70' (yellow-red card) 77'; Pierrot (yellow card) 78'; Phaëton (yellow card) 79'	Stadium: Stade des Alpes; Referee: Jérôme Miguelgorry

14 August 2021 4	Guingamp	0–2	Amiens	Guingamp
19:00 CEST (UTC+2)	Riou (yellow card) 36'; Pierrot (yellow card) 41'; Roux (yellow card) 56'	Report	Lachuer (yellow card) 32'; Papeau 41'; Lahne (yellow card) 55', (goal) 71'	Stadium: Stade de Roudourou; Referee: Alexandre Perreau Niel

23 August 2021 5	Auxerre	1–2	Guingamp	Auxerre
20:45 CEST (UTC+2)	Sinayoko (yellow card) 40'; Perrin 64'; Autret (yellow card) 89'	Report	M'Changama (yellow card) 45'; Phaëton (yellow card) 49'; Diarra 72'	Stadium: Stade de l'Abbé-Deschamps; Referee: Aurelien Petit

28 August 2021 6	Guingamp	1–1	Ajaccio	Guingamp
19:00 CEST (UTC+2)	Ba 78'	Report	Gonzalez 38'	Stadium: Stade de Roudourou; Referee: Guillaume Paradis

11 September 2021 7	Paris FC	0–1	Guingamp	Paris
15:00 CEST (UTC+2)		Report	Abi 41'	Stadium: Stade Sébastien Charléty; Referee: Marc Bollengier

18 September 2021 8	Niort	2–0	Guingamp	Niort
19:00 CEST (UTC+2)	Boutobba 15', 64'; Zemzemi (yellow card) 55'; Louiserre (yellow card) 73'	Report	Gomis (yellow card) 9'; Muyumba (yellow card) 67'; Merghem (yellow card) 85'	Stadium: Stade René Gaillard; Referee: Mathieu Vernice

21 September 2021 9	Guingamp	1–2	Sochaux	Guingamp
19:00 CEST (UTC+2)	M'Changama (yellow card) 5'; Mombris (yellow card) 13'; Sivis 45+2'; Muyumba (yellow card) 63'; Camara (yellow card) 76'; Merghem (yellow card) 90+5'	Report	Ndiaye 48', (yellow card) 58'; Do Couto (yellow card) 54'; Ambri 78' (pen.); Kitala (yellow card) 81'; Prévot (yellow card) 87'; Kalulu (yellow card) 90+8'	Stadium: Stade de Roudourou; Referee: Nicolas Rainville

24 September 2021 10	Quevilly-Rouen	2–2	Guingamp	Rouen
19:00 CEST (UTC+2)	Sidibé 2', (yellow card) 39'; Gbellé 27' (pen.); Jozefzoon (yellow card) 33'; Diaby (yellow card) 84'	Report	Pierrot 13', (yellow card) 13'; Sivis (yellow card) 26'; Muyumba 45'; Phaëton (yellow card) 84'	Stadium: Stade Robert Diochon; Referee: Guillaume Paradis

2 October 2021 11	Guingamp	2–1	Rodez	Guingamp
19:00 CEST (UTC+2)	Pierrot 4', (yellow card) 66'; Sivis 53'; Roux (yellow card) 55'; Diarra (yellow card) 85'	Report	Dépres 9'; Célestine (yellow card) 45+2'	Stadium: Stade de Roudourou; Referee: Pierre Legat

16 October 2021 12	Nancy	2–1	Guingamp	Tomblaine
21:00 CEST (UTC+2)	Triboulet 59'; Dewaele (yellow card) 72'; Haag (red card) 75'; Jung 87'	Report	Carnot 17', (yellow card) 51'; Abi (yellow card) 45'; Barthelmé (yellow card) 49'; Muyumba (yellow card) 63'	Stadium: Stade Marcel Picot; Referee: Marc Bollengier

23 October 2021 13	Guingamp	3–1	Nîmes	Guingamp
19:00 CEST (UTC+2)	Pierrot 5', 66'; M'Changama 69'; Livolant (yellow card) 81'	Report	Paquiez (yellow card) 70'; Koné (yellow card) 75', (goal) 80' (pen.); Ómarsson (yellow card) 81'; Sainte-Luce (yellow card) 86'	Stadium: Stade de Roudourou; Referee: Jérôme Miguelgorry

30 October 2021 14	Toulouse	2–2	Guingamp	Toulouse
15:00 CEST (UTC+2)	Spierings 58'; Ngoumou 62'; Van den Boomen (yellow card) 85'; Desler (yellow card) 90+2'	Report	Diarra (yellow card) 2'; Pierrot 25'; M'Changama 89'; Livolant (yellow card) 90+3'	Stadium: Stadium de Toulouse; Referee: Nicolas Rainville

6 November 2021 15	Guingamp	2–3	Bastia	Guingamp
19:00 CET (UTC+1)	M'Changama 53'; Guidi 90+3' (o.g.); Abi (yellow card) 90+4'	Report	Santelli 28', (yellow card) 33'; Le Cardinal (yellow card) 45+3'; Salles-Lamonge 60'; Saadi 63'; Robic (yellow card) 90+4'	Stadium: Stade de Roudourou; Referee: Benjamin Lepaysant

20 November 2021 16	Pau	2–0	Guingamp	Pau
19:00 CEST (UTC+2)	Nišić (yellow card) 35'; Assifuah 36'; D. Gomis (yellow card) 39'; Dembélé (yellow card) 77'; Naidji 83'	Report	Barthelmé (yellow card) 35'; Roux (yellow card) 45+1'; Diarra (yellow card) 58'; Gomis (penalty missed) 80'	Stadium: Nouste Camp; Referee: Frank Schneider

3 December 2021 17	Guingamp	3–2	Dijon	Guingamp
19:00 CET (UTC+1)	Ba (yellow card) 43'; Pierrot 52', (yellow card) 55'; Gomis 72'; Roux 78'; Diarra (yellow card) 82'	Report	Ngouyamsa (yellow card) 20'; Younoussa (yellow card) 32'; Scheidler 38', 47'; Benzia (yellow card) 53'; Traoré (yellow card) 67'; Deaux (yellow card) 73'	Stadium: Stade de Roudourou; Referee: Aurelien Petit

11 December 2021 18	Caen	2–0	Guingamp	Caen
19:00 CET (UTC+1)	da Costa 14'; Lepenant (yellow card) 65'; Mendy (penalty missed) 73", 81' (pen.)	Report	Roux (yellow card) 28' (yellow-red card) 78'; Ba (yellow card) 32'; Merghem (yellow card) 42'; Lemonnier (yellow card) 73'; Ndenbe (red card) 80'	Stadium: Stade Michel d'Ornano; Attendance: 9,834; Referee: Mathieu Vernice

21 December 2021 19	Guingamp	2–1	Dunkerque	Guingamp
20:45 CET (UTC+1)	Merghem (yellow card) 42'; Pierrot 49', 55'; Ba (yellow card) 61'	Report	Kikonda (yellow card) 45'; Tchokounté 52'; Thiam (yellow card) 70'	Stadium: Stade de Roudourou; Referee: Olivier Thual

8 January 2022 20	Valenciennes	1–1	Guingamp	Valenciennes
19:00 CET (UTC+1)	Ntim 22'; Debuchy (red card) 73'	Report	Lemonnier (yellow card) 26'; Sivis (yellow card) 70'; Pierrot 75' (pen.), (yellow card) 75'	Stadium: Stade du Hainaut; Referee: Gaël Angoula

15 January 2022 21	Guingamp	0–0	Grenoble	Guingamp
20:45 CET (UTC+1)	Ba (yellow card) 15'; Barthelmé (yellow card) 45+1'; Quemper (yellow card) 90+4'	Report	Jeno (yellow card) 72'	Stadium: Stade de Roudourou; Referee: Guillaume Paradis

22 January 2022 22	Amiens	3–0	Guingamp	Amiens
19:00 CET (UTC+1)	Badji 57', 63'; Akolo 84'	Report	Muyumba (yellow card) 71'	Stadium: Stade de la Licorne; Referee: Benjamin Lepaysant

5 February 2022 23	Guingamp	1–1	Auxerre	Guingamp
19:00 CET (UTC+1)	Sampaio (yellow card) 71'; Muyumba 77'	Report	Sinayoko 64'; Arcus (yellow card) 80'	Stadium: Stade de Roudourou; Referee: Abdelatif Kherradji

12 February 2022 24	Ajaccio	0–1	Guingamp	Ajaccio
19:00 CET (UTC+1)	Courtet (red card) 10'; El Idrissy (yellow card) 90'	Report	Livolant (yellow card) 29', (goal) 66'; Ba (yellow card) 40'; Roux (yellow card) 57' (yellow-red card) 84'; Philipe Sampaio (yellow card) 87'	Stadium: Stade François Coty; Referee: Pierre Legat

19 February 2022 25	Guingamp	1–1	Paris FC	Guingamp
19:00 CET (UTC+1)	M'Changama (yellow card) 33'; Muyumba (yellow card) 88'; Gomis 90+3'	Report	Siby (yellow card) 28'; López 71'	Stadium: Stade de Roudourou; Referee: Jérôme Miguelgorry

26 February 2022 26	Guingamp	1–0	Niort	Guingamp
19:00 CET (UTC+1)	Merghem (yellow card) 72'; Pierrot 78'	Report	Doukansy (yellow card) 40'	Stadium: Stade de Roudourou; Referee: Gaël Angoula

5 March 2022 27	Sochaux	1–0	Guingamp	Montbéliard
19:00 CET (UTC+1)	Virginius 68'	Report		Stadium: Stade Auguste Bonal; Attendance: Alexandre Perreau Niel

12 March 2022 28	Guingamp	1–1	Quevilly-Rouen	Guingamp
19:00 CET (UTC+1)	Roux 8'; Quemper (yellow card) 78'; M'Changama (yellow card) 78'; Lemonnier (yellow card) 90+3'	Report	Sidibé (yellow card) 21'; Soumaré 28'; Belkorchia (yellow card) 37'; Nazon (yellow card) 81'	Stadium: Stade de Roudourou; Referee: Abdelatif Kherradji

15 March 2022 29	Rodez	1–1	Guingamp	Rodez
19:00 CET (UTC+1)	Ouammou (yellow card) 30'; Célestine (red card) 45+4'; Buadés (yellow card) 52'; Danger (yellow card) 61'; Dépres 90+5' (pen.); Malanda (red card) 90+6'	Report	Roux (yellow card) 6'; Livolant 16'; Sivis (yellow card) 19'; Merghem (yellow card) 61' (yellow-red card) 63'; Diarra (yellow card) 89'	Stadium: Stade Paul-Lignon; Referee: Arnaud Baert

19 March 2022 30	Guingamp	3–1	Nancy	Guingamp
20:00 CET (UTC+1)	Roux 9'; M'Changama 37', 56'; Livolant (yellow card) 60'	Report	Bianda 36'; Ciss (yellow card) 76'	Stadium: Stade de Roudourou; Referee: Jérôme Miguelgorry

2 April 2022 31	Nîmes	0–2	Guingamp	Nîmes
19:00 CET (UTC+1)	Mbow (yellow card) 32'	Report	Livolant 48'; Pierrot 86'	Stadium: Stade des Costières; Referee: Alexandre Perreau Niel

9 April 2022 32	Guingamp	2–4	Toulouse	Guingamp
15:00 CET (UTC+1)	Ba 31'; Merghem 34', (yellow card) 72'; Quemper (yellow card) 74'; Diarra (yellow card) 81'	Report	Ratão 15', (yellow card) 59'; Evitt-Healey 38', 48', 75'; Desler (yellow card) 40'; Spierings (yellow card) 68'	Stadium: Stade de Roudourou; Referee: Remi Landry

16 April 2022 33	Bastia	1–2	Guingamp	Furiani
19:00 CET (UTC+1)	Sainati (yellow card) 44'; Guidi (yellow card) 53'; Talal 57'	Report	Ba (yellow card) 51'; Pierrot 62', 74'	Stadium: Stade Armand Cesari; Referee: Nicolas Rainville

19 April 2022 34	Guingamp	3–0	Pau	Guingamp
20:00 CET (UTC+1)	Cathline 18'; Diarra (yellow card) 32'; Gomis 40'; Barthelmé 59'; Lemonnier (yellow card) 90+1'; Quemper (yellow card) 90+2'	Report	Batisse (yellow card) 43'; Evans (yellow card) 53'	Stadium: Stade de Roudourou; Referee: Guillaume Paradis

22 April 2022 35	Dijon	3–3	Guingamp	Dijon
19:00 CET (UTC+1)	Scheidler 1'; Dobre 27', 45+2'; Pi (yellow card) 59'	Report	Sivis 54'; Diarra (yellow card) 63'; M'Changama 80' (pen.); Muyumba 90+1'	Stadium: Stade Gaston Gérard; Referee: Eric Wattellier

30 April 2022 36	Guingamp	2–1	Caen	Guingamp
19:00 CEST (UTC+2)	Pierrot 71'; Sivis (yellow card) 77'; Merghem 81'	Report	Diani 14'; Vandermersch (yellow card) 56'; Mendy (yellow card) 63'; Court (yellow card) 68'	Stadium: Stade de Roudourou; Referee: Arnaud Baert

7 May 2022 37	Dunkerque	1–3	Guingamp	Dunkirk
19:00 CEST (UTC+2)	Ba (yellow card) 45'; Niané 78'; Brahimi (yellow card) 80'	Report	Livolant 20'; M'Changama 27'; Pierrot 37'; Quemper (yellow card) 55'	Stadium: Stade Marcel-Tribut; Referee: Abdelatif Kherradji

14 May 2022 38	Guingamp	2–1	Le Havre	Guingamp
19:00 CEST (UTC+2)	M'Changama 38'; Merghem 76'	Report	Roux 32' (o.g.)	Stadium: Stade de Roudourou; Referee: Amaury Delerue

=== Coupe de France ===
13 November 2021 Seventh round	US Liffré	0–8	Guingamp	Liffré
15:00 CET (UTC+1)		Report	Sampaio 23'; Gomis 27'; L’Helgouac’h 37' (o.g.); Phaeton 47', 52'; Barthelmé 57'; Abi 63', 72'	Stadium: Stade Nelson Paillou; Attendance: 2,900; Referee: Bartolomeu Varela Teles

27 November 2021 Eighth round	Guingamp	1–0	Stade Briochin	Guingamp
16:15 CET (UTC+1)	Lemonnier 26'	Report		Stadium: Stade de Roudourou; Referee: Jérémy Stinat

18 December 2021 Round of 64	Guingamp	2–3	Amiens	Guingamp
16:00 CET (UTC+1)	Livolant 63'; Gomis 73'	Report	Akolo 20', 45+1', 55'	Stadium: Stade de Roudourou; Referee: Romain Lissorgue
