= 2020–21 En Avant Guingamp season =

Guingamp
2020–21 season
- President: Bertrand Desplat
- Head coach: Sylvain Didot (until 30 August); Mehmed Baždarević (from 30 August to 1 February); Frédéric Bompard (from 1 February)
- Stadium: Stade de Roudourou
- Ligue 2: 9th
- Coupe de France: Eighth round
- Top goalscorer: League: Yannick Gomis (9); All: Yannick Gomis (9)
Home colours	Away colours	Third colours

The 2020–21 En Avant Guingamp season was the club's 108th season in existence and its second consecutive season in the second division of French football. In addition to the domestic league, Guingamp participated in this season's edition of the Coupe de France. The season covered the period from 1 July 2020 to 30 June 2021.

== Players ==
=== First-team squad ===
As of 16 January 2021.

Note: Flags indicate national team as defined under FIFA eligibility rules; some limited exceptions apply. Players may hold more than one non-FIFA nationality.

No.	Pos.	Nation	Player
1	GK	DEN	Nicolai Larsen
2	MF	FRA	Baptiste Roux
3	DF	FRA	Morgan Poaty
4	DF	BRA	Philipe Sampaio
5	DF	GAB	Lloyd Palun
6	MF	RSA	Lebogang Phiri
7	MF	FRA	El Hadji Ba
9	FW	HAI	Frantzdy Pierrot
10	MF	COM	Youssouf M'Changama (captain)
11	MF	FRA	Louis Carnot
13	FW	SEN	Yannick Gomis
15	DF	FRA	Jérémy Sorbon (vice-captain)
16	GK	FRA	Enzo Basilio
18	FW	CMR	Paul-Georges Ntep

No.	Pos.	Nation	Player
19	MF	FRA	Guessouma Fofana
20	DF	CMR	Félix Eboa Eboa
21	DF	BEL	Logan Ndenbe
22	MF	FRA	Bryan Pelé
23	FW	FRA	Ronny Rodelin
24	MF	FRA	Pierrick Valdivia
25	FW	FRA	Matthias Phaeton
26	MF	TOG	Alaixys Romao
27	DF	MLI	Sikou Niakaté
28	DF	FRA	Jérémy Mellot
29	MF	FRA	Jérémy Livolant
30	GK	CAF	Dominique Youfeigane
32	MF	FRA	Tristan Muyumba

==== Out on loan ====
Note: Flags indicate national team as defined under FIFA eligibility rules; some limited exceptions apply. Players may hold more than one non-FIFA nationality.

No.	Pos.	Nation	Player
—	DF	FRA	Yohan Baret (on loan to Avranches)
—	DF	FRA	Yohan Bilingi (on loan to Concarneau)
—	DF	POR	Pedro Rebocho (on loan to Paços de Ferreira)

No.	Pos.	Nation	Player
—	MF	FRA	Mehdi Boudjemaa (on loan to Laval)
—	MF	FRA	Mehdi Merghem (on loan to Nancy)
—	FW	FRA	Ervin Taha (on loan to Laval)

== Pre-season and friendlies ==
Win Draw Loss

8 August 2020 Friendly	Guingamp (France)	Cancelled	(France) Le Havre	Guingamp, France
17:00 CEST (UTC+2)				Stadium: Stade de Roudourou

8 August 2020 Friendly	Guingamp (France)	2–1	(France) Stade Laval	Guingamp, France
17:00 CEST (UTC+2)	Gomis 45' (pen.); Ngbakoto 57'	Report	Boudjemaa 21'	Stadium: Stade de Roudourou; Attendance: 0

12 August 2020 Friendly	Brest (France)	1–0	(France) Guingamp	Brest, France
17:00 CEST (UTC+2)	Benvindo 14'			Stadium: Stade Francis-Le Blé

15 August 2020 Friendly	Lorient (France)	1–0	(France) Guingamp	Lorient, France
15:00 CEST (UTC+2)	Bozok 77'			Stadium: Stade du Moustoir

4 September 2020 Friendly	Guingamp (France)	Cancelled	(France) FC Chambly	France
15:00 CEST (UTC+2)

13 November 2020 Friendly	Guingamp (France)	0–1	(France) Brest	Guingamp, France
15:30 CET (UTC+1)		Report	Le Douaron 45'	Stadium: Stade de Roudourou; Attendance: 0

== Competitions ==
=== Overview ===
Competition	First match	Last match	Starting round	Final position	Record							
Competition	First match	Last match	Starting round	Final position	Pld	W	D	L	GF	GA	GD	Win %
Ligue 2	22 August 2020	15 May 2021	Matchday 1	9th	38	10	17	11	41	43	−2	26.32
Coupe de France	20 January 2021		Eighth round	Eighth round	1	0	0	1	1	3	−2	0.00
Total					39	10	17	12	42	46	−4	25.64

Source: Soccerway

=== Ligue 2 ===
==== League table ====
Pos	Team	Pld	W	D	L	GF	GA	GD	Pts
7	Sochaux	38	12	15	11	45	37	+8	51
8	Nancy	38	11	14	13	53	53	0	47
9	Guingamp	38	10	17	11	41	43	−2	47
10	Amiens	38	11	14	13	34	40	−6	47
11	Valenciennes	38	12	11	15	50	59	−9	47

Source: Ligue 2
Rules for classification: 1) Points; 2) Goal difference; 3) Number of goals scored; 4) Head-to-head goal difference; 5) Fair play points

==== Results summary ====
Overall								Home						Away					
Pld	W	D	L	GF	GA	GD	Pts	W	D	L	GF	GA	GD	W	D	L	GF	GA	GD
38	10	17	11	41	43	−2	47	4	10	5	19	23	−4	6	7	6	22	20	+2

Source: Ligue 2

==== Results by round ====
Round	1	2	3	4	5	6	7	8	9	10	11	12	13	14	15	16	17	18	19	20	21	22	23	24	25	26	27	28	29	30	31	32	33	34	35	36	37	38
Ground	H	A	H	A	H	A	H	A	H	A	H	A	H	A	H	A	A	H	A	H	A	H	A	H	A	H	A	H	A	H	A	H	A	H	H	A	H	A
Result	L	D	L	W	W	L	W	L	D	D	D	D	L	D	D	L	L	D	W	D	D	L	L	D	D	D	D	L	W	D	L	D	W	W	D	W	W	W
Position	13	15	16	16	11	14	9	14	14	13	13	13	14	14	14	15	15	16	15	14	15	17	18	17	17	17	17	18	17	18	18	18	18	16	16	13	12	9

Source: Ligue 2
A = Away; H = Home; W = Win; D = Draw; L = Loss

==== Matches ====
The league fixtures were announced on 9 July 2020.

22 August 2020 1	Guingamp	0–1	Niort	Guingamp
19:00 CEST (UTC+2)		Report	Bâ 39'	Stadium: Stade de Roudourou; Referee: Bastien Dechepy

29 August 2020 2	Nancy	2–2	Guingamp	Tomblaine
15:00 CEST (UTC+2)	Biron 63', 69'	Report	Gomis 56'; Phaeton 90+2'	Stadium: Stade Marcel Picot; Referee: Olivier Thual

12 September 2020 3	Guingamp	1–3	Le Havre	Guingamp
15:00 CEST (UTC+2)	Phaeton 73'	Report	Thiaré 6', 45'; Mellot 68' (o.g.)	Stadium: Stade de Roudourou; Referee: Frank Schneider

19 September 2020 4	Pau	0–1	Guingamp	Pau
19:00 CEST (UTC+2)		Report	Gomis 55'	Stadium: Stade du Hameau; Attendance: 2,742; Referee: Mehdi Mokhtari

26 September 2020 5	Guingamp	1–0	Grenoble	Guingamp
19:00 CEST (UTC+2)	Ngbakoto 23'	Report		Stadium: Stade de Roudourou; Attendance: 4,764; Referee: Sylvain Palhies

3 October 2020 6	Dunkerque	1–0	Guingamp	Dunkirk
19:00 CEST (UTC+2)	Sy (yellow card) 5'; Romil 63'	Report	Rebocho (yellow card) 2'; Niakaté (yellow card) 29'	Stadium: Stade Marcel-Tribut; Referee: Abdelatif Kherradji

19 October 2020 7	Guingamp	2–0	Auxerre	Guingamp
20:45 CEST (UTC+2)	Pelé 59'; Livolant 81'; Mellot (yellow card) 89'	Report	Lloris (yellow card) 76'; Fortuné (yellow card) 88'	Stadium: Stade de Roudourou; Referee: Nicolas Rainville

24 October 2020 8	Caen	1–0	Guingamp	Caen
15:00 CEST (UTC+2)	Court (yellow card) 2'; Beka Beka (yellow card) 45'; Deminguet 90'	Report	Roux (yellow card) 20'; Fofana (yellow card) 77'	Stadium: Stade Michel d'Ornano; Referee: Thomas Léonard

31 October 2020 9	Guingamp	0–0	Sochaux	Guingamp
19:00 CET (UTC+1)	Mellot (yellow card) 38'	Report	Bedia (red card) 64'	Stadium: Stade de Roudourou; Referee: Sylvain Palhies

7 November 2020 10	Clermont	0–0	Guingamp	Clermont-Ferrand
15:00 CET	N'Simba (yellow card) 53'; Hountondji (yellow card) 82'	Report	Romao (yellow card) 80'; Roux (yellow card) 88'	Stadium: Stade Gabriel Montpied; Referee: Arnaud Baert

23 November 2020 11	Guingamp	2–2	Ajaccio	Guingamp
20:45 CET (UTC+1)	Gomis 49'; Sampaio (yellow card) 72'; Palun 90'	Report	Nouri 22'; Huard (yellow card) 26'; Moussiti-Oko 54'	Stadium: Stade de Roudourou; Referee: Romain Delpech

28 November 2020 12	Rodez	1–1	Guingamp	Rodez
19:00 CET (UTC+1)	Boissier (yellow card) 10'; Henry 33', (yellow card) 40'; Bardy (yellow card) 59'; Sanaia (yellow card) 69'	Report	Rodelin 52'; Valdivia (yellow card) 59'; Mellot (yellow card) 86'; Livolant (yellow card) 90'	Stadium: Stade Paul-Lignon; Referee: Benjamin Lepaysant

1 December 2020 13	Guingamp	1–2	Troyes	Guingamp
19:00 CET (UTC+1)	Niakaté (yellow card) 25'; Valdivia (yellow card) 45'; Rodelin 53'	Report	Touzghar 18'; Salmier (yellow card) 22'; Barthelmé (yellow card) 27'; Ba 77'; Pires (yellow card) 90'	Stadium: Stade de Roudourou; Referee: Brendan Roffet

5 December 2020 14	Toulouse	2–2	Guingamp	Toulouse
19:00 CET (UTC+1)	Healey 51'; Moreira (yellow card) 55'; Amian (yellow card) 63'; Antiste 73'	Report	Valdivia (yellow card) 50'; Gomis 56' (pen.); Livolant (yellow card) 65'; Ngbakoto 81'; Niakaté (yellow card) 88'; Fofana (yellow card) 90+4'	Stadium: Stadium de Toulouse; Referee: Rémi Landry

12 December 2020 15	Guingamp	1–1	Valenciennes	Guingamp
19:00 CET (UTC+1)	Romao (yellow card) 44'; Ngbakoto 66'; M'Changama (yellow card) 90'	Report	D'Almeida (yellow card) 27'; Pellenard (yellow card) 29'; Guillaume 55'	Stadium: Stade de Roudourou; Referee: Romain Lissorgue

18 December 2020 16	Chambly	3–0	Guingamp	Beauvais
20:00 CET (UTC+1)	Jaques 21' (pen.); El Hriti (yellow card) 37'; Derrien (red card) 58'; Heinry 63'; Pinoteau (yellow card) 68'; Delos 84'	Report	Romao (yellow card) 36'; Sorbon (yellow card) 46'; Palun (yellow card) 48'	Stadium: Stade Pierre Brisson; Referee: Nicolas Rainville

22 December 2020 17	Paris FC	3–2	Guingamp	Paris
20:00 CET (UTC+1)	Kikonda (yellow card) 9'; Laura 26'; Gakpa 63'; Name 90'	Report	Sorbon (yellow card) 55'; Fofana (yellow card) 61'; Phaeton 66'; Ngbakoto 82'	Stadium: Stade Sébastien Charléty; Referee: Alexandre Perreau Niel

5 January 2021 18	Guingamp	2–2	Amiens	Guingamp
20:00 CET (UTC+1)	Y. Gomis 6'; Niakaté (yellow card) 15'; Pierrot 37'	Report	Lusamba 16' (pen.); I. Gomis (yellow card) 35'; Akolo (yellow card) 44'; Assogba (yellow card) 72'; Opoku (yellow card) 83'; Alphonse 85'	Stadium: Stade de Roudourou; Referee: Benjamin Lepaysant

8 January 2021 19	Châteauroux	2–3	Guingamp	Châteauroux
20:00 CEST (UTC+1)	Mulumba (yellow card) 38', (goal) 78'; Operi 79'; Morante (yellow card) 90'	Report	Rodelin 59'; Pierrot 67', (yellow card) 90'; Ngbakoto 74'; Roux (yellow card) 88'	Stadium: Stade Gaston Petit; Referee: Nicolas Rainville

16 January 2021 20	Guingamp	0–0	Nancy	Guingamp
19:00 CET (UTC+1)	Niakaté (yellow card) 82'	Report	Nguiamba (yellow card) 35'; Ciss (yellow card) 81' (yellow-red card) 87'	Stadium: Stade de Roudourou; Referee: Guillaume Paradis

23 January 2021 21	Le Havre	1–1	Guingamp	Le Havre
19:00 CET (UTC+1)	Thiaré 59' (pen.); Y. Coulibaly (yellow card) 90+3'	Report	Niakaté (yellow card) 58'; Rodelin 90'	Stadium: Stade Océane; Referee: Mathieu Vernice

30 January 2021 22	Guingamp	2–3	Pau	Guingamp
19:00 CET (UTC+1)	Livolant (yellow card) 34'; Y. Gomis 55'; Roux 59'	Report	Sadzoute (yellow card) 16'; Armand 27', 36'; Lobry (yellow card) 64'; Assifuah 76'	Stadium: Stade de Roudourou; Referee: Romain Delpech

2 February 2021 23	Grenoble	2–1	Guingamp	Grenoble
20:00 CET (UTC+2)	Tapoko (yellow card) 35'; Diallo (yellow card) 40'; Ravet 56'; Semedo 90+1'	Report	Y. Gomis 43'; Rodelin (yellow card) 45+3'	Stadium: Stade des Alpes; Referee: Benjamin Lepaysant

5 February 2021 24	Guingamp	0–0	Dunkerque	Guingamp
20:00 CET (UTC+1)	Palun (yellow card) 29'; M'Changama (yellow card) 54'	Report	Bâ (yellow card) 39'; Thiam (yellow card) 68'; Dudouit (red card) 75'; Kebbal (yellow card) 85'; Maraval (yellow card) 90+2'	Stadium: Stade de Roudourou; Referee: Alexandre Perreau Niel

13 February 2021 25	Auxerre	1–1	Guingamp	Auxerre
15:00 (CET) (UTC+1)	Bernard (yellow card) 25', (goal) 37'; Jubal (yellow card) 66'	Report	Y. Gomis 18'	Stadium: Stade de l'Abbé-Deschamps; Referee: Pierre Gaillouste

22 February 2021 26	Guingamp	2–2	Caen	Guingamp
20:45 CET (UTC+1)	Niakaté (yellow card) 47', (goal) 71'; Pierrot 66'; Ntep (yellow card) 75'	Report	Oniangué 26'; Gioacchini (yellow card) 50'; Mendy 55'	Stadium: Stade de Roudourou; Referee: Mehdi Mokhtari

27 February 2021 27	Sochaux	0–0	Guingamp	Montbéliard
19:00 CET (UTC+1)		Report	Niakaté (yellow card) 22'; Romao (yellow card) 51'	Stadium: Stade Auguste Bonal; Referee: Arnaud Baert

2 March 2021 28	Guingamp	0–5	Clermont	Guingamp
20:00 CET (UTC+1)	Pelé (red card) 45+1'	Report	Allevinah 14'; Dossou 31'; Bayo 54'; Tell 65'; Gomis (yellow card) 69'; Iglesias 72'	Stadium: Stade de Roudourou; Referee: Nicolas Rainville

13 March 2021 29	Ajaccio	0–2	Guingamp	Ajaccio
20:00 CET (UTC+1)	Diallo (yellow card) 61'; Bayala (yellow card) 73'; Nouri (yellow card) 87'	Report	Fofana 22'; M'Changama (yellow card) 51'; Sampaio (yellow card) 53'; Ba (yellow card) 58'; Pierrot 78'	Stadium: Stade François Coty; Referee: Benjamin Lepaysant

20 March 2021 30	Guingamp	1–1	Rodez	Guingamp
19:00 CET (UTC+1)	Fofana 57'; Romao (yellow card) 84'; Pierrot (yellow card) 86'	Report	Douline (yellow card) 53'; Leborgne (yellow card) 67', (goal) 82'	Stadium: Stade de Roudourou; Referee: Guillaume Paradis

3 April 2021 31	Troyes	1–0	Guingamp	Troyes
20:00 CET (UTC+1)	Dingomé 47'; Gory (yellow card) 55'	Report	Phiri (yellow card) 64'	Stadium: Stade de l'Aube; Referee: Olivier Thual

12 April 2021 32	Guingamp	1–1	Toulouse	Guingamp
20:45 CEST (UTC+2)	Livolant 27'; Mellot (yellow card) 55'; Sampaio (yellow card) 71'; Niakaté (yellow card) 90+2'	Report	Healey 37'; Koné (yellow card) 40'; Sanna (yellow card) 50'	Stadium: Stade de Roudourou; Referee: Alexandre Perreau Niel

17 April 2021 33	Valenciennes	0–1	Guingamp	Valenciennes
20:00 CEST (UTC+2)	Picouleau (yellow card) 39'	Report	Phiri (yellow card) 4'; Rodelin 48'; Mellot (yellow card) 74'; Niakaté (yellow card) 80'; Pierrot (yellow card) 85'	Stadium: Stade du Hainaut; Referee: Gaël Angoula

20 April 2021 34	Guingamp	1–0	Chambly	Guingamp
20:00 CEST (UTC+2)	Fofana (yellow card) 38'; Rodelin 90+2'	Report	Camelo (yellow card) 51'	Stadium: Stade de Roudourou; Referee: Mehdi Mokhtari

24 April 2021 35	Guingamp	0–0	Paris FC	Guingamp
20:00 CEST (UTC+2)	Niakaté (yellow card) 6'; Rodelin (yellow card) 75'; Phiri (yellow card) 79'; Romao (yellow card) 89'	Report	Belaud (yellow card) 66'; Kanté (yellow card) 78'; Martin (penalty missed) 90'	Stadium: Stade de Roudourou; Referee: Sylvain Palhies

1 May 2021 36	Amiens	0–3	Guingamp	Amiens
20:00 CEST (UTC+2)	Papeau (yellow card) 35'	Report	M'Changama 8', 33'; Pierrot 62'	Stadium: Stade de la Licorne; Referee: Rémi Landry

8 May 2021 37	Guingamp	2–0	Châteauroux	Guingamp
20:00 CEST (UTC+2)	Fofana 17'; Pierrot (yellow card) 33', (goal) 53'	Report	Ibara (yellow card) 66'	Stadium: Stade de Roudourou; Referee: Hakim Ben El Hadj

15 May 2021 38	Niort	0–2	Guingamp	Niort
20:00 CET (UTC+1)	Jacob (yellow card) 55'; Louiserre (yellow card) 81', (red card) 81'; Ameka (yellow card) 81'	Report	Y. Gomis 39' (pen.); Muyumba (yellow card) 87', (goal) 90+2'	Stadium: Stade René Gaillard; Referee: Olivier Thual

=== Coupe de France ===
20 January 2021 Eighth round	Guingamp	1–3	Caen	Guingamp
18:45 CET (UTC+1)	M'Changama 90+3'	Report	Deminguet 45'; Gioacchini 47'; Mendy 75'	Stadium: Stade du Roudourou; Attendance: 0 Referee: Romain Lissorgue
