= Tristan Muyumba =

French footballer (born 1997)

Personal information
- Full name: Tristan Muyumba Nkita
- Date of birth: 7 March 1997 (age 29)
- Place of birth: Paris, France
- Height: 1.65 m (5 ft 5 in)
- Position: Midfielder

Team information
- Current team: Atlanta United
- Number: 8

Youth career
- 2004–2011: AS Meudon
- 2011–2012: Montrouge FC 92
- 2012–2017: Monaco

Senior career*
Years	Team	Apps	(Gls)
2016–2019	Monaco B	51	(4)
2017–2019	Monaco	0	(0)
2017–2018	→ Cercle Brugge (loan)	1	(0)
2020	Toulon	7	(0)
2020–2021	EA Guingamp B	9	(1)
2021–2023	EA Guingamp	70	(4)
2023–	Atlanta United	98	(6)

International career
2014	France U17	3	(1)
- * Club domestic league appearances and goals as of 13:19, 15 November 2026 (UTC)

Tristan Muyumba Nkita (born 7 March 1997) is a French professional footballer who plays as a midfielder for Major League Soccer club Atlanta United.

== Club career ==
=== Monaco ===
Muyumba made his professional debut on 26 April 2017 in the Coupe de France semi-final against Paris Saint-Germain. He started the game and played the whole match in a 5–0 away loss.

=== EA Guingamp ===
After a half year at Toulon, Muyumba moved to the B-team of EA Guingamp in July 2020.

=== Atlanta United ===
On 5 July 2023, Muyumba signed with Major League Soccer side Atlanta United on a deal until the end of the 2027 season.

== International career ==
Born in France, Muyumba is of Congolese descent. He was a youth international for France.

== Career statistics ==
=== Club ===
As of Updated through June 24, 2026

Appearances and goals by club, season and competition
Club	Season	League			Cup		Continental		Other		Total	
Club	Season	Division	Apps	Goals	Apps	Goals	Apps	Goals	Apps	Goals	Apps	Goals
Monaco B	2015–16	National 2	4	0	—		—		—		4	0
Monaco B	2016–17	National 2	28	4	—		—		—		28	4
Monaco B	2018–19	National 2	19	0	—		—		—		19	0
Monaco B	Total		51	4	—		—		—		51	4
Monaco	2016–17	Ligue 1	0	0	1	0	—		—		1	0
Cercle Brugge (loan)	2017–18	Challenger Pro League	1	0	0	0	—		—		1	0
Toulon	2019–20	National 1	7	0	0	0	—		—		7	0
EA Guingamp B	2020–21	National 2	9	1	0	0	—		—		9	1
EA Guingamp	2020–21	Ligue 2	4	1	—		—		—		4	1
EA Guingamp	2021–22	Ligue 2	31	3	2	0	—		—		33	3
EA Guingamp	2022–23	Ligue 2	35	0	0	0	—		—		35	0
EA Guingamp	Total		70	5	2	0	—		—		72	4
Atlanta United	2023	MLS	10	1	—		—		4	0	14	1
Atlanta United	2024	MLS	30	0	1	0	—		6	0	37	0
Atlanta United	2025	MLS	24	1					3	0	27	1
Atlanta United	2026	MLS	14	1	3	0					17	1
Atlanta United	Total		78	3	4	0	—		13	0	95	1
Career total			199	12	6	0	0	0	13	0	218	12
