= Philipe Sampaio =

Brazilian footballer

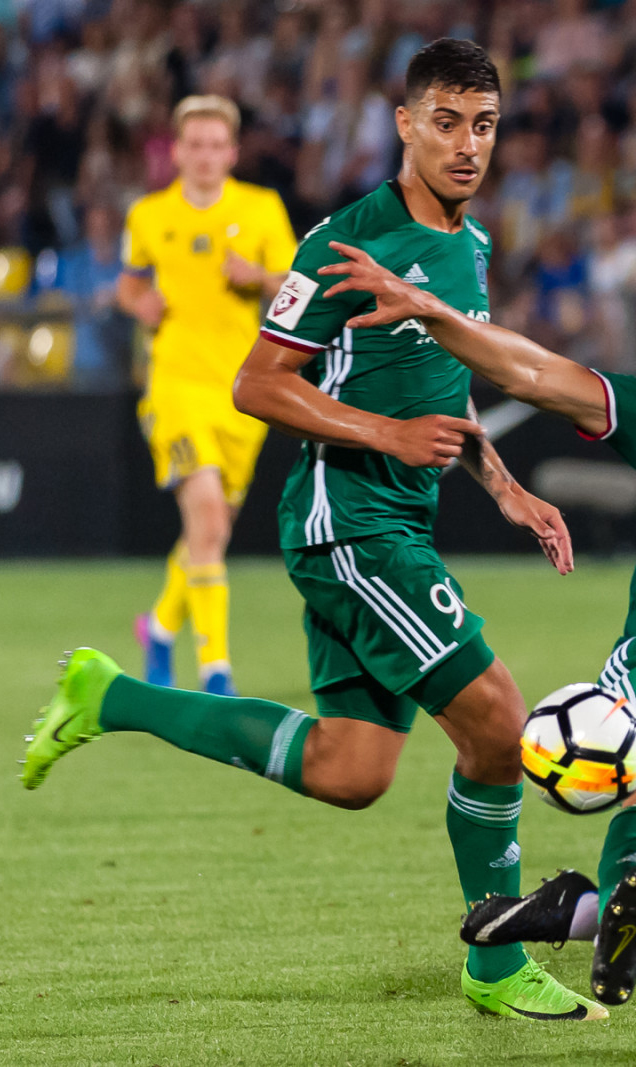
- Sampaio with Akhmat Grozny in 2017

Personal information
- Full name: Philipe Sampaio Azevedo
- Date of birth: 11 November 1994 (age 32)
- Place of birth: São Paulo, Brazil
- Height: 1.91 m (6 ft 3 in)
- Position: Centre-back

Team information
- Current team: Athletic
- Number: 13

Youth career
- 2008−2012: São Paulo
- 2012−2013: Santos

Senior career*
Years	Team	Apps	(Gls)
2013−2014	Santos	0	(0)
2014	→ Paulista (loan)	2	(0)
2014−2017	Boavista	60	(2)
2017−2018	Akhmat Grozny	15	(1)
2018–2019	Feirense	10	(1)
2019–2020	Tondela	22	(2)
2020–2022	Guingamp	40	(1)
2022–2026	Botafogo	34	(1)
2024	→ RWD Molenbeek (loan)	5	(0)
2024–2025	→ Atlético Goianiense (loan)	1	(0)
2026–	Athletic	5	(0)
- * Club domestic league appearances and goals as of 18 November 2026

Philipe Sampaio Azevedo (born 11 November 1994) is a Brazilian professional football player who plays as a centre-back for Athletic.

== Club career ==
Born in São Paulo, Sampaio is a youth prospect from Santos FC, which loaned him out in 2014 to Paulista in the Campeonato Paulista.

On 24 July 2014, Sampaio travelled to Portugal to go on a tryout at Boavista, that proved successful, with the 19-year-old signing for three seasons. He made his professional debut against S.L. Benfica at 24 August 2014.

On 2 July 2017, Sampaio signed a four-year contract with Akhmat Grozny. He was released by Akhmat on 3 July 2018.

On 21 August 2018, he returned to Portugal, signing with Feirense. A year later, he moved to C.D. Tondela on a two-year deal.

On 1 July 2020, he signed a four-year contract for Ligue 2 club EA Guingamp.

On 9 March 2022, Sampaio returned to Brazil and signed a three-year contract with Botafogo.

On 16 January 2024, Botafogo sent Sampaio on loan with an option-to-buy to Belgian Pro League club RWD Molenbeek until the end of the season.

== Career statistics ==
As of 21 March 2023

Appearances and goals by club, season and competition
Club	Season	League			State league		Cup		Continental		Other		Total	
Club	Season	Division	Apps	Goals	Apps	Goals	Apps	Goals	Apps	Goals	Apps	Goals	Apps	Goals
Paulista	2014	Paulista	—		2 (Note: Appearances in Campeonato Paulista)	0	—		—		—		2	0
Boavista	2014–15	Primeira Liga	23	1	—		0	0	—		3 (Note: Appearances in Taça da Liga)	0	26	1
Boavista	2015–16	Primeira Liga	12	0	—		2	0	—		1	0	14	0
Boavista	2016–17	Primeira Liga	25	1	—		1	0	—		1	0	27	1
Boavista	Total		60	2	—		3	0	—		5	0	68	2
Akhmat Grozny	2017–18	Russian Premier League	15	1	—		0	0	—		—		15	1
Feirense	2018–19	Primeira Liga	10	1	—		2	0	—		2	1	14	2
Tondela	2019–20	Primeira Liga	22	2	—		1	0	—		0	0	23	2
Guingamp	2020–21	Ligue 2	26	0	—		1	0	—		0	0	27	0
Guingamp	2021–22	Ligue 2	14	1	—		3	1	—		0	0	17	2
Guingamp	Total		40	1	—		4	1	—		0	0	44	2
Botafogo	2022	Série A	16	0	2 (Note: Appearances in Campeonato Carioca)	0	3	0	—		—		21	0
Botafogo	2023	Série A	0	0	3	0	0	0	0	0	—		3	0
Botafogo	Total		16	0	5	0	3	0	0	0	—		24	0
Career total			162	7	7	0	13	1	0	0	7	1	145	7
