= Frantzdy Pierrot =

Haitian footballer (born 1995)

Personal information
- Date of birth: 29 March 1995 (age 31)
- Place of birth: Cap-Haïtien, Haiti
- Height: 1.94 m (6 ft 4 in)
- Position: Forward

Team information
- Current team: AEK Athens

College career
Years	Team	Apps	(Gls)
2014–2015	Northeastern Huskies	34	(10)
2016–2017	Coastal Carolina Chanticleers	41	(25)

Senior career*
Years	Team	Apps	(Gls)
2016–2018	Reading United	22	(12)
2018–2019	Mouscron	28	(6)
2019–2022	Guingamp	76	(28)
2022–2024	Maccabi Haifa	66	(28)
2024–	AEK Athens	37	(8)
2026	→ Çaykur Rizespor (loan)	10	(0)

International career^{‡}
2018–	Haiti	57	(34)
- * Club domestic league appearances and goals as of 10 May 2026 ‡ National team caps and goals as of 03:13, 5 October 2026 (UTC)

Frantzdy Pierrot (French: [pjɛʁo]; born 29 March 1995) is a Haitian professional footballer who plays as a forward for Super League Greece club AEK Athens and the Haiti national team.

== Club career ==
=== College and amateur ===
Pierrot played two years of college soccer at Northeastern University between 2014 and 2015, before transferring to Coastal Carolina University in 2016, where he played for another two years.

Pierrot also appeared for USL PDL side Reading United in 2016 and 2017.

=== Professional ===
On 19 January 2018, Pierrot was selected with the 27th overall pick of the 2018 MLS SuperDraft by Colorado Rapids. However, he did not sign with the club.

On 27 July 2018, Pierrot signed a four-year contract with Belgian First Division A side Mouscron. One year later, he joined French Ligue 2 club Guingamp. He signed a four-year contract.

On 3 July 2022, Pierrot signed a three-year contract with Maccabi Haifa of the Israeli Premier League.

On 10 September 2024, Pierrot signed a three-year contract with AEK Athens.

== International career ==
Pierrot was called up to the 40-man provisional squad for the 2019 CONCACAF Gold Cup. He was included in the final squad.

Pierrot was called up to the 35-man provisional squad for the 2023 CONCACAF Gold Cup. He was also included in the reduced 28 player squad. Pierrot was included in the final squad.

On 15 May 2026, he was included in Haiti head coach Sébastien Migné's 26-man squad for the 2026 FIFA World Cup.

== Personal life ==
Pierrot was born in Haiti, but grew up in Massachusetts in the United States where he attended Melrose High School. His younger brother Frantz Pierrot is also a professional footballer. Pierrot is an American citizen.

== Career statistics ==
=== Club ===
As of match played 9 May 2026

Appearances and goals by club, season and competition
Club	Season	League			National cup (Note: Includes Belgian Cup, Coupe de France, Israel State Cup, Greek Cup, Turkish Cup)		League cup (Note: Includes Toto Cup)		Continental		Other		Total	
Club	Season	Division	Apps	Goals	Apps	Goals	Apps	Goals	Apps	Goals	Apps	Goals	Apps	Goals
Mouscron	2018–19	Belgian Pro League	25	6	2	1	—		—		10 (Note: Appearances in Belgian Pro League European play-offs)	2	37	9
Mouscron	2019–20	Belgian Pro League	3	0	—		—		—		—		3	0
Mouscron	Total		28	6	2	1	—		—		10	2	40	9
Guingamp	2019–20	Ligue 2	19	7	0	0	0	0	—		—		19	7
Guingamp	2020–21	Ligue 2	23	6	0	0	—		—		—		23	6
Guingamp	2021–22	Ligue 2	34	15	2	0	—		—		—		36	15
Guingamp	Total		76	28	2	0	—		—		—		78	28
Maccabi Haifa	2022–23	Israeli Premier League	35	9	4	0	0	0	12 (Note: Appearances in UEFA Champions League)	5	1 (Note: Appearance in Israeli Super Cup)	0	52	14
Maccabi Haifa	2023–24	Israeli Premier League	25	16	2	1	1	0	18 (Note: Eight appearances and five goals in UEFA Champions League, six appearances in UEFA Europa League, four appearances and two goals in UEFA Conference League)	7	1	0	47	24
Maccabi Haifa	2024–25	Israeli Premier League	2	1	0	0	2	0	2 (Note: Appearances in UEFA Conference League)	2	–		6	3
Maccabi Haifa	Total		62	26	7	0	3	0	32	14	2	0	105	41
AEK Athens	2024–25	Super League Greece	28	5	6	0	—		–		—		34	5
AEK Athens	2025–26	Super League Greece	9	2	3	2	—		9	0	—		21	4
AEK Athens	Total		37	7	9	2	—		9	0	—		55	9
Çaykur Rizespor (loan)	2025–26	Süper Lig	10	0	1	0	—		—		—		11	0
Career total			213	67	21	3	3	0	41	14	12	2	289	87

=== International ===
As of match played 4 October 2026

Appearances and goals by national team and year
National team	Year	Apps	Goals
Haiti	2018	4	2
Haiti	2019	13	5
Haiti	2020	0	0
Haiti	2021	6	7
Haiti	2022	0	0
Haiti	2023	7	7
Haiti	2024	5	7
Haiti	2025	12	5
Haiti	2026	10	1
Total		57	34

Scores and results list Haiti's goal tally first, score column indicates score after each Pierrot goal.

List of international goals scored by Frantzdy Pierrot
No.	Date	Venue	Opponent	Score	Result	Competition
1	10 September 2018	Stade Sylvio Cator, Port-au-Prince, Haiti	Sint Maarten	1–0	13–0	2019–20 CONCACAF Nations League qualification
2	10 September 2018	Stade Sylvio Cator, Port-au-Prince, Haiti	Sint Maarten	11–0	13–0	2019–20 CONCACAF Nations League qualification
3	6 June 2019	Estadio La Portada, La Serena, Chile	Chile	1–0	1–2	Friendly
4	16 June 2019	Estadio Nacional de Costa Rica, San José, Costa Rica	Bermuda	1–1	2–1	2019 CONCACAF Gold Cup
5	16 June 2019	Estadio Nacional de Costa Rica, San José, Costa Rica	Bermuda	2–1	2–1	2019 CONCACAF Gold Cup
6	10 September 2019	Stade Sylvio Cator, Port-au-Prince, Haiti	Curaçao	1–0	1–1	2019–20 CONCACAF Nations League A
7	10 October 2019	Thomas Robinson Stadium, Nassau, Bahamas	Costa Rica	1–1	1–1	2019–20 CONCACAF Nations League A
8	5 June 2021	TCIFA National Academy, Providenciales, Turks and Caicos Islands	Turks and Caicos Islands	7–0	10–0	2022 FIFA World Cup qualification
9	5 June 2021	TCIFA National Academy, Providenciales, Turks and Caicos Islands	Turks and Caicos Islands	9–0	10–0	2022 FIFA World Cup qualification
10	5 June 2021	TCIFA National Academy, Providenciales, Turks and Caicos Islands	Turks and Caicos Islands	10–0	10–0	2022 FIFA World Cup qualification
11	2 July 2021	DRV PNK Stadium, Fort Lauderdale, United States	Saint Vincent and the Grenadines	2–0	6–1	2021 CONCACAF Gold Cup qualification
12	6 July 2021	DRV PNK Stadium, Fort Lauderdale, United States	Bermuda	1–0	4–1	2021 CONCACAF Gold Cup qualification
13	6 July 2021	DRV PNK Stadium, Fort Lauderdale, United States	Bermuda	2–0	4–1	2021 CONCACAF Gold Cup qualification
14	6 July 2021	DRV PNK Stadium, Fort Lauderdale, United States	Bermuda	3–0	4–1	2021 CONCACAF Gold Cup qualification
15	25 March 2023	Blakes Estate Stadium, Lookout, Montserrat	Montserrat	2–0	4–0	2022–23 CONCACAF Nations League B
16	28 March 2023	Estadio Panamericano, San Cristóbal, Dominican Republic	Bermuda	1–0	3–1	2022–23 CONCACAF Nations League B
17	28 March 2023	Estadio Panamericano, San Cristóbal, Dominican Republic	Bermuda	2–0	3–1	2022–23 CONCACAF Nations League B
18	25 June 2023	NRG Stadium, Houston, United States	Qatar	2–1	2–1	2023 CONCACAF Gold Cup
19	2 July 2023	Bank of America Stadium, Charlotte, United States	Honduras	1–0	1–2	2023 CONCACAF Gold Cup
20	15 October 2023	Hasely Crawford Stadium, Port of Spain, Trinidad and Tobago	Jamaica	1–0	2–3	2023–24 CONCACAF Nations League A
21	15 October 2023	Hasely Crawford Stadium, Port of Spain, Trinidad and Tobago	Jamaica	2–3	2–3	2023–24 CONCACAF Nations League A
22	6 September 2024	Mayagüez Athletics Stadium, Mayagüez, Puerto Rico	Puerto Rico	2–1	4–1	2024–25 CONCACAF Nations League B
23	11 October 2024	Trinidad Stadium, Oranjestad, Aruba	Aruba	1–1	3–1	2024–25 CONCACAF Nations League B
24	14 October 2024	Trinidad Stadium, Oranjestad, Aruba	Aruba	5–3	5–3	2024–25 CONCACAF Nations League B
25	15 November 2024	Mayagüez Athletics Stadium, Mayagüez, Puerto Rico	Sint Maarten	2–0	8–0	2024–25 CONCACAF Nations League B
26	15 November 2024	Mayagüez Athletics Stadium, Mayagüez, Puerto Rico	Sint Maarten	4–0	8–0	2024–25 CONCACAF Nations League B
27	15 November 2024	Mayagüez Athletics Stadium, Mayagüez, Puerto Rico	Sint Maarten	6–0	8–0	2024–25 CONCACAF Nations League B
28	18 November 2024	Mayagüez Athletics Stadium, Mayagüez, Puerto Rico	Puerto Rico	3–0	3–0	2024–25 CONCACAF Nations League B
29	22 March 2025	Sumgayit City Stadium, Sumgait, Azerbaijan	Azerbaijan	1–0	3–0	Friendly
30	22 March 2025	Sumgayit City Stadium, Sumgait, Azerbaijan	Azerbaijan	2–0	3–0	Friendly
31	7 June 2025	Trinidad Stadium, Oranjestad, Aruba	Aruba	2–0	5–0	2026 FIFA World Cup qualification
32	19 June 2025	Shell Energy Stadium, Houston, United States	Trinidad and Tobago	1–0	1–1	2025 CONCACAF Gold Cup
33	13 November 2025	Ergilio Hato Stadium, Willemstad, Curaçao	Costa Rica	1–0	1–0	2026 FIFA World Cup qualification
34	2 June 2026	Inter Miami CF Stadium, Fort Lauderdale, United States	New Zealand	3–0	4–0	Friendly

== Honours ==
Maccabi Haifa

- Israeli Premier League: 2022–23
- Israel Super Cup: 2023

AEK Athens

- Super League Greece: 2025–26
