= Enzo Basilio =

French footballer (born 1994)

Personal information
- Date of birth: 3 October 1994 (age 32)
- Place of birth: Dijon, France
- Height: 1.87 m (6 ft 2 in)
- Position: Goalkeeper

Team information
- Current team: Nancy
- Number: 1

Senior career*
Years	Team	Apps	(Gls)
2012–2016	Dijon II	19	(0)
2013–2018	Dijon	0	(0)
2016–2017	→ Quevilly II (loan)	6	(0)
2016–2017	→ Quevilly (loan)	2	(0)
2017–2018	→ Rodez (loan)	31	(0)
2018–2020	Concarneau	59	(0)
2020–2025	Guingamp	172	(0)
2025–	Nancy	31	(0)
- * Club domestic league appearances and goals as of 12 May 2026

Enzo Basilio (born 3 October 1994) is a French professional footballer who plays as a goalkeeper for Ligue 2 club Nancy.

== Professional career ==
Basilio made his professional debut with Dijon in a 3-0 Coupe de la Ligue loss to FC Lorient on 15 December 2015. Basilio spent most of his early career as backup goalkeeper at Dijon, before a couple loans at Quevilly and Rodez. After successful seasons at Concarneau, Basilio joined Guingamp on 30 May 2020.

On 11 July 2025, Basilio signed a two-year contract with Nancy, recently promoted to Ligue 2.

Basilio holds both French and Italian nationalities.

== Career statistics ==
As of match played on 14 May 2025

Appearances and goals by club, season and competition
Club	Season	League			National Cup		League Cup		Other		Total	
Club	Season	Division	Apps	Goals	Apps	Goals	Apps	Goals	Apps	Goals	Apps	Goals
Dijon	2015–16	Ligue 2	0	0	2	0	2	0	—		4	0
Dijon	2016–17	Ligue 1	0	0	0	0	0	0	—		0	0
Dijon	2017–18	Ligue 1	0	0	0	0	0	0	—		0	0
Dijon	Total		0	0	2	0	2	0	—		4	0
Quevilly-Rouen (loan)	2016–17	Championnat National	2	0	0	0	—		—		2	0
Rodez (loan)	2017–18	Championnat National	31	0	1	0	—		—		32	0
Concarneau	2018–19	Championnat National	34	0	3	0	—		—		37	0
Concarneau	2019–20	Championnat National	25	0	1	0	—		—		26	0
Concarneau	Total		59	0	4	0	—		—		63	0
Guingamp	2020–21	Ligue 2	32	0	0	0	—		—		32	0
Guingamp	2021–22	Ligue 2	32	0	0	0	—		—		32	0
Guingamp	2022–23	Ligue 2	36	0	0	0	—		—		36	0
Guingamp	2023–24	Ligue 2	38	0	2	0	—		—		40	0
Guingamp	2024–25	Ligue 2	34	0	0	0	—		1	0	35	0
Guingamp	Total		172	0	2	0	—		1	0	175	0
Career totals			264	0	9	0	2	0	1	0	276	0

== Personal life ==
Basilio is of Italian descent, his family having roots in San Severo, Apulia. He is a fan of Juventus FC
