= Arthur Vitelli =

French footballer (born 2000)

Personal information
- Date of birth: 4 April 2000 (age 26)
- Place of birth: Dijon, France
- Height: 1.85 m (6 ft 1 in)
- Position: Centre-back

Team information
- Current team: Sochaux
- Number: 4

Senior career*
Years	Team	Apps	(Gls)
2017–2021	Dijon B	23	(0)
2021–2023	Guingamp B	20	(0)
2022–2023	Guingamp	5	(0)
2023	→ Podbeskidzie (loan)	14	(0)
2023–	Sochaux	70	(0)
- * Club domestic league appearances and goals as of 23 June 2026

Arthur Vitelli (born 4 June 2000) is a French professional footballer who plays as a centre-back for Ligue 2 club Sochaux.

== Career ==
Vitelli began his career with the reserves of Dijon in 2017. He transferred to the reserves of Guingamp in the summer 2021. He made his professional debut with the senior Guingamp side in a 3–0 Ligue 2 loss to Amiens on 22 January 2022. On 10 June 2022, he signed a professional contract with Guingamp.

On 5 January 2023, Vitelli was sent on loan to Polish I liga side Podbeskidzie Bielsko-Biała until the end of the season, with an option to buy. On 30 August 2023, he signed for Championnat National club Sochaux.
