= Yohan Bilingi =

French footballer (born 1999)

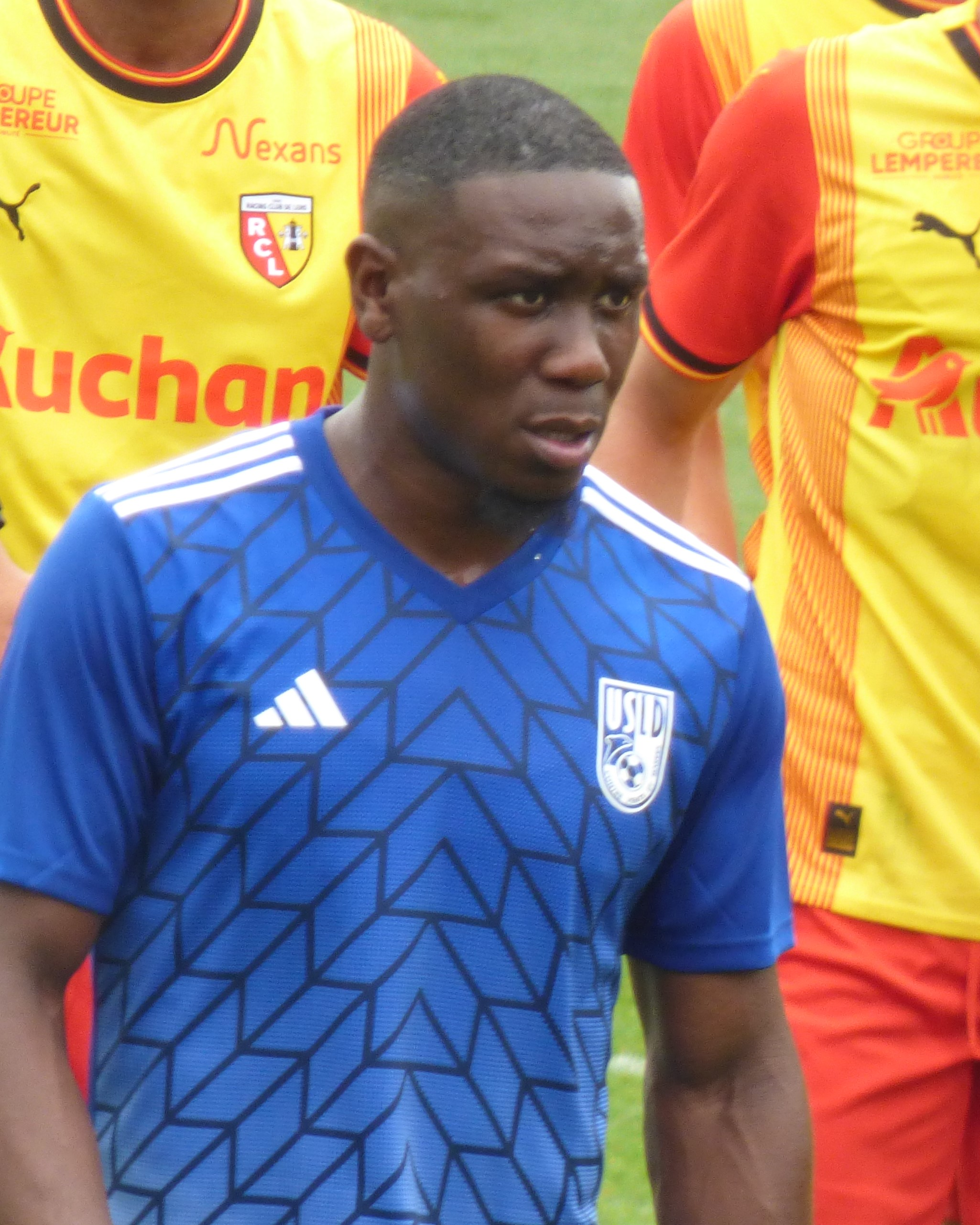
- Bilingi with in Dunkerque in 2023

Personal information
- Full name: Yohan Kinkela Bilingi
- Date of birth: 1 February 1999 (age 27)
- Place of birth: Alfortville, France
- Height: 1.82 m (6 ft 0 in)
- Positions: Right-back; centre-back

Team information
- Current team: Spartak Subotica
- Number: 28

Youth career
- 2005–2009: Sucy
- 2009–2015: RC Joinville
- 2015–2016: Cannes
- 2016–2018: Guingamp

Senior career*
Years	Team	Apps	(Gls)
2016–2022	Guingamp B	40	(1)
2019–2022	Guingamp	11	(0)
2019–2020	→ Bastia-Borgo (loan)	16	(1)
2020–2021	→ Concarneau (loan)	32	(1)
2022–2024	Dunkerque	64	(4)
2025–	Spartak Subotica	45	(0)

International career
2017	France U19	2	(0)
- * Club domestic league appearances and goals as of 13 June 2026

Yohan Kinkela Bilingi (born 1 February 1999) is a French professional footballer who plays as a right-back or centre-back for Serbian Superliga team Spartak Subotica.

== Club career ==
Bilingi is a former youth academy player of Cannes. After graduating through academy of Guingamp, he joined Bastia-Borgo on loan in September 2019. On 31 May 2020, Concarneau announced the signing of Bilingi on a season long loan deal.

Following his return to Guingamp after two consecutive loan spells, Bilingi made his professional debut on 24 July 2021 in a goalless draw against Le Havre.

On 3 June 2022, Bilingi agreed to join Dunkerque for the 2022–23 season.

On 24 January 2025, Bilingi move to Serbia and signed for Serbian Superliga team Spartak Subotica.

== International career ==
Bilingi is a former French youth national team player. He has played two matches for under-19 team in 2017.

== Personal life ==
Bilingi holds French and Congolese nationalities.
