= Bryan Pelé =

French footballer (born 1992)

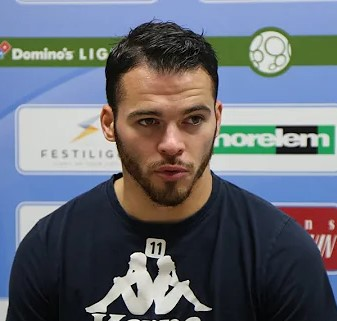

Personal information
- Date of birth: 25 March 1992 (age 34)
- Place of birth: Ploërmel, France
- Height: 1.69 m (5 ft 7 in)
- Position: Midfielder

Team information
- Current team: Enfants de Guer

Youth career
- Lorient

Senior career*
Years	Team	Apps	(Gls)
2010–2015	Lorient B	68	(6)
2013–2015	Lorient	23	(0)
2015–2017	Brest	73	(10)
2017–2019	Troyes	64	(8)
2019–2021	Guingamp	50	(8)
2021–2022	AEL Limassol	13	(0)
2023–2024	Concarneau	0	(0)
2024–	Enfants de Guer		
- * Club domestic league appearances and goals as of 1 July 2024

Bryan Pelé (born 25 March 1992) is a French professional footballer who plays as a midfielder for an amateur side Enfants de Guer.

== Career ==
Pelé made his Ligue 1 debut on 25 August 2013 in a 2–0 away loss against EA Guingamp. He replaced Yann Jouffre after 68 minutes. Ten minutes later, he received a yellow card.

He joined Stade Brestois in January 2015, in a 2 1/2-year contract.

In June 2017, it was announced Pelé had signed a two-year contract with Troyes.

In June 2019, Pelé signed a two-year contract with Ligue 2 side EA Guingamp.

On 9 August 2023, Pelé joined Concarneau on a one-season contract.
