= Louis Carnot =

French footballer (born 2001)

Personal information
- Date of birth: 25 February 2001 (age 25)
- Place of birth: Pabu, France
- Height: 1.82 m (6 ft 0 in)
- Position: Midfielder

Team information
- Current team: Andrézieux (on loan from Nancy)

Youth career
- 2006–2010: Plélo
- 2010–2019: Guingamp

Senior career*
Years	Team	Apps	(Gls)
2018–2022	Guingamp B	49	(3)
2019–2022	Guingamp	20	(1)
2021	→ Concarneau (loan)	12	(1)
2022–2023	Lille B	14	(1)
2023–	Nancy	15	(1)
2023–	Nancy B	7	(0)
2025–	→ Andrézieux (loan)	0	(0)

International career
2017	France U16	10	(1)
2018–2019	France U18	3	(0)
- * Club domestic league appearances and goals as of 24 January 2025

Louis Carnot (French: [lwi kaʁno]; born 25 February 2001) is a French professional footballer who plays as a midfielder for Championnat National 1 club Andrézieux on loan from Nancy.

== Club career ==
On 8 March 2019, Carnot signed his first professional contract with his youth club Guingamp for a three-year term. He made his professional debut with Guingamp in a 2–2 Ligue 1 tie with Nîmes on 18 May 2019.

On 1 February 2021, Carnot joined Concarneau on loan for the remainder of the 2020–21 season, in order to get more playing time.

On 31 January 2025, Carnot moved on loan to Andrézieux.

== Personal life ==
Carnot is the son of the former footballer Stéphane Carnot.
