= Pierre Lemonnier (footballer) =

French footballer (born 1993)

Personal information
- Date of birth: 6 July 1993 (age 33)
- Place of birth: Rennes, France
- Height: 1.84 m (6 ft 0 in)
- Position: Defender

Team information
- Current team: Red Star
- Number: 24

Youth career
- 1997–2003: US Bazouges-la-Pérouse
- 2003–2011: Rennes

Senior career*
Years	Team	Apps	(Gls)
2011–2014	Rennes B	48	(0)
2014–2015	Dijon	0	(0)
2014–2015	Dijon B	18	(0)
2015–2017	Granville	49	(4)
2017–2021	Le Mans	117	(7)
2021–2025	Guingamp	72	(2)
2024	Guingamp B	1	(0)
2025–	Red Star	36	(2)
- * Club domestic league appearances and goals as of 11 May 2026

Pierre Lemonnier (French pronunciation: [pjɛʁ ləmɔnje]; born 6 July 1993) is a French professional footballer who plays as a defender for Ligue 2 club Red Star.

He previously appeared in the Coupe de la Ligue for Ligue 2 club Dijon, played in the fourth and fifth tiers for Rennes B, Dijon B and Granville, with whom he reached the quarter-finals of the 2015–16 Coupe de France, and helped Le Mans gain promotion to the Championnat National in 2017–18 and to Ligue 2 the following season. In 2021, he joined Guingamp of Ligue 2, where he spent three-and-a-half years before moving on to Red Star.

== Life and career ==
Lemonnier was born in Rennes in 1993, and raised in nearby Bazouges-la-Pérouse, where his parents worked in agriculture. As a youngster, he played football at his village club, US Bazouges-la-Pérouse, before joining the junior ranks of the local league club, Rennes, in 2003 as a nine-year-old midfielder. He gradually developed into a defender, playing at right back or in his preferred central defence. He was not taken into the club's centre de formation (academy) – the stream that leads towards a professional football career – with the rest of his age group in 2008, but after an impressive season with the amateur youths, he was accepted as a late entrant, although he felt somewhat of an outsider.

He made one appearance for Rennes B in the Championnat de France Amateur (CFA) in the 2010–11 season, and signed a two-year contrat stagiaire (trainee contract) in 2011. In the next two seasons, he made 23 appearances for Rennes B in the Championnat de France Amateur 2 (CFA 2), mostly as a starter; he also played alongside his brother Antony, two years his senior, in central defence for Rennes' Division Supérieure Élite (seventh-tier) team. When his contract ended, he was not offered a professional deal, but was offered and accepted a one-year extension on amateur terms. He started 24 of the 26 matches in the 2013–14 CFA 2 season, and was released at the end of it.

After a three-day trial, Lemonnier signed for a year at Ligue 2 club Dijon, again on amateur terms. He played once for the first team, starting in a Coupe de la Ligue match against Laval, made 18 appearances for the reserves in the CFA 2, and was released at the end of his contract.

He moved on to Granville of the CFA 2. He was a member of their team that progressed through nine rounds of the 2015–16 Coupe de France to reach the quarter-finals, in which they faced Ligue 1 club Marseile. The game was goalless until the 50th minute when Michy Batshuayi scored; Lemonnier had a chance to tie the scores following a 69th-minute corner, but did not place his header sufficiently accurately. He and goalkeeper Jérémy Aymes were named as Le Figaro's men of the match. He helped the team gain promotion to the CFA, and made 27 fourth-tier appearances in the 2016–17 season.

Lemonnier chose to leave Granville at the end of the season. Those involved with the club were disappointed at his departure, and the media reported that it would much weaken the side. He signed for Le Mans, newly promoted from CFA 2 to the new fourth-tier Championnat National 2. He missed only one match as Le Mans finished as champions of their section and gained promotion to the third tier. He started 32 of a possible 34 matches in the 2018–19 Championnat National, and scored in two of five consecutive wins in the last five matches of the regular season that secured Le Mans a play-off place. Facing Gazélec Ajaccio, who finished 18th in Ligue 2, Le Mans lost the home leg by two goals to one. In the away leg, they took a 73rd-minute lead, but still trailed on the away goals rule. In the third of six minutes stoppage time, Lemonnier conceded a penalty. The attempt was saved, and in the 97th minute, Mamadou Soro scored with an overhead kick to confirm a third successive promotion for Le Mans.

Lemonnier started Le Mans' opening match of the 2019–20 Ligue 2 season.

In July 2021, he moved to Guingamp on a two-year contract with an option for a third.

Lemonnier signed for another Ligue 2 club, Red Star, on 3 February 2025.
