= Hady Camara =

French footballer (born 2002)

Personal information
- Date of birth: 17 January 2002 (age 24)
- Place of birth: Paris, France
- Height: 1.97 m (6 ft 6 in)
- Position: Defender

Team information
- Current team: Paris 13 Atletico

Youth career
- 2013–2018: Paris 13 Atletico
- 2018–2020: Guingamp

Senior career*
Years	Team	Apps	(Gls)
2020–2024	Guingamp B	22	(0)
2021–2024	Guingamp	11	(0)
2023	→ Annecy (loan)	1	(0)
2024–2025	RAAL La Louvière	9	(0)
2025–2026	Seraing	22	(0)
2026–	Paris 13 Atletico	0	(0)

International career
2021	France U20	2	(0)
- * Club domestic league appearances and goals as of 20 April 2026

Hady Camara (born 17 January 2002) is a French professional footballer who plays as a defender for Ligue 3 club Paris 13 Atletico.

== Career ==
Camara is a youth product of Paris 13 Atletico, and moved to Guingamp's youth academy in 2018. He began his career with their reserves in 2020. On 11 June 2020, he signed his first professional contract with Guingamp for 2 years.

On 17 July 2025, Camara signed one-season contract with Seraing.

== International career ==
Born in France, Camara is of Senegalese descent. He was called up to the France U20s in September 2021, making 2 appearances.
