= Matthias Phaëton =

Guadeloupean footballer (born 2000)

Matthias Phaeton
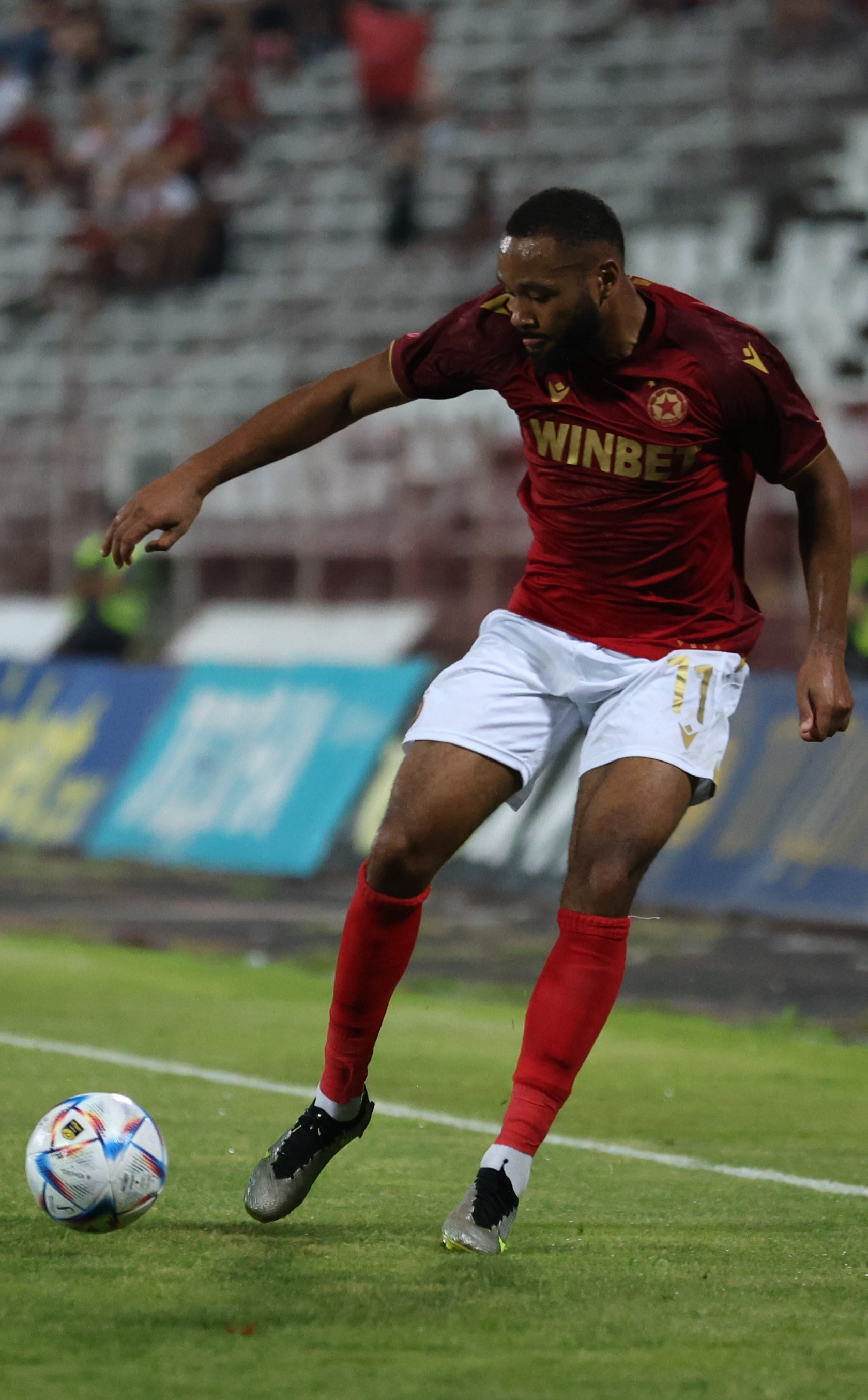
- Phaëton in 2023

Personal information
- Full name: Matthias Jean Phaëton
- Date of birth: 8 January 2000 (age 26)
- Place of birth: Colombes, France
- Height: 1.85 m (6 ft 1 in)
- Position: Forward

Team information
- Current team: Lion City Sailors
- Number: 23

Youth career
- 2006–2014: Racing Colombes
- 2014–2015: ACBB
- 2015–2017: Brest

Senior career*
| Years | Team | Apps | (Gls) |
| 2017–2022 | Guingamp II | 41 | (17) |
| 2018–2022 | Guingamp | 53 | (4) |
| 2020 | → Borgo (loan) | 5 | (0) |
| 2022–2023 | Grenoble | 37 | (9) |
| 2023–2026 | CSKA Sofia | 58 | (9) |
| 2025–2026 | → Zürich (loan) | 25 | (7) |
| 2026– | Lion City Sailors | 5 | (4) |

International career^{‡}
| 2016 | France U16 | 5 | (4) |
| 2016 | France U17 | 1 | (0) |
| 2021– | Guadeloupe | 34 | (12) |
- * Club domestic league appearances and goals as of 1 November 2026 ‡ National team caps and goals as of 8 July 2025

Matthias Jean Phaëton (born 8 January 2000) is a professional footballer who plays as a forward for Singapore Premier League club Lion City Sailors. Born in metropolitan France, he plays for the Guadeloupe national team.

== Club career ==
A youth product of Stade Brestois 29, Phaëton left for disciplinary reasons and joined Guingamp in January 2017. He made his professional debut with Guingamp in a 5–0 Ligue 1 loss to Nantes on 4 November 2018.

On 29 June 2022, Phaëton signed a three-year deal with Grenoble. He made a total of 86 appearances in Ligue 2 for Guingamp and Grenoble from 2018 to 2023 and also featured in four Ligue 1 games for Guingamp in the 2018-19 season.

Phaëton then made the move from Grenoble to Bulgarian club CSKA Sofia, where he notched nine goals and eight assists. He also made two appearances for the Bulgarian side in the UEFA Conference League qualifying round in 2023, when they eventually fell to Romania’s Sepsi OSK.

=== Zürich (loan) ===
Phaëton spent the 2025–26 season on loan at Swiss Super League side Zürich, scoring eight goals in 27 appearances.

=== Lion City Sailors ===
Phaëton was announced on 28 July 2026 as the latest addition for Singapore Premier League champions Lion City Sailors, signing on a 3-year deal. He had turned down an offer from Turkish second-tier side Bursaspor to make the move to Singapore.

== International career ==
Born in metropolitan France, Phaëton is of Guadeloupean descent. Phaeton is a youth international for France, and represented them at the 2016 Toulon Tournament scoring four goals in five games.

Phaëton debuted for the Guadeloupe national team in a 2–0 2021 CONCACAF Gold Cup qualification win over Bahamas on 3 July 2021, where he scored his side's first goal. As of 29 July 2026, he has scored 12 goals in 34 matches for Guadeloupe.

== Career statistics ==
=== Club ===
As of match played 12 September 2026

Appearances and goals by club, season and competition
| Club | Season | League | | | National Cup | | Continental | | Other | | Total | |
| Club | Season | Division | Apps | Goals | Apps | Goals | Apps | Goals | Apps | Goals | Apps | Goals |
|---|---|---|---|---|---|---|---|---|---|---|---|---|
| Brest II | 2016–17 | Championnat National 3 | 1 | 0 | – | | – | | – | | 1 | 0 |
| Brest II | 2017–18 | Championnat National 3 | 1 | 0 | – | | – | | – | | 1 | 0 |
| Brest II | Total | | 2 | 0 | 0 | 0 | 0 | 0 | 0 | 0 | 2 | 0 |
| Guingamp II | 2017–18 | Championnat National 3 | 11 | 2 | – | | – | | – | | 11 | 2 |
| Guingamp II | 2018–19 | Championnat National 3 | 21 | 12 | – | | – | | – | | 21 | 12 |
| Guingamp II | 2019–20 | Championnat National 2 | 6 | 2 | – | | – | | – | | 6 | 2 |
| Guingamp II | 2021–22 | Championnat National 2 | 3 | 1 | – | | – | | – | | 3 | 1 |
| Guingamp II | Total | | 41 | 17 | 0 | 0 | 0 | 0 | 0 | 0 | 41 | 17 |
| Guingamp | 2018–19 | Ligue 1 | 4 | 0 | 0 | 0 | – | | – | | 4 | 0 |
| Guingamp | 2019–20 | Ligue 2 | 0 | 0 | 0 | 0 | – | | – | | 0 | 0 |
| Guingamp | 2020–21 | Ligue 2 | 27 | 3 | 1 | 0 | – | | – | | 28 | 3 |
| Guingamp | 2021–22 | Ligue 2 | 22 | 1 | 1 | 2 | – | | – | | 23 | 3 |
| Guingamp | Total | | 53 | 4 | 2 | 2 | 0 | 0 | 0 | 0 | 55 | 6 |
| Borgo (loan) | 2019–20 | Championnat National | 5 | 0 | – | | – | | – | | 5 | 0 |
| Grenoble | 2022–23 | Ligue 2 | 37 | 9 | 6 | 1 | – | | – | | 43 | 10 |
| CSKA Sofia | 2023–24 | First League | 33 | 5 | 4 | 1 | 2 | 0 | 1 | 0 | 40 | 6 |
| CSKA Sofia | 2024–25 | First League | 25 | 4 | 3 | 0 | – | | – | | 28 | 4 |
| CSKA Sofia | Total | | 58 | 9 | 7 | 1 | 2 | 0 | 1 | 0 | 68 | 10 |
| Zürich (loan) | 2025–26 | Swiss Super League | 25 | 7 | 2 | 1 | — | | — | | 27 | 8 |
| Lion City Sailors | 2026–27 | Singapore Premier League | 1 | 0 | 0 | 0 | 0 | 0 | 1 | 0 | 2 | 0 |
| Lion City Sailors | Total | | 1 | 0 | 0 | 0 | 0 | 0 | 1 | 0 | 2 | 0 |
| Career total | | | 222 | 46 | 16 | 5 | 2 | 0 | 2 | 0 | 242 | 51 |

=== International ===
As of match played 25 June 2025

Appearances and goals by national team and year
| National team | Year | Apps | Goals |
|---|---|---|---|
| Guadeloupe | 2021 | 6 | 3 |
| Guadeloupe | 2022 | 6 | 2 |
| Guadeloupe | 2023 | 12 | 6 |
| Guadeloupe | 2024 | 6 | 0 |
| Guadeloupe | 2025 | 4 | 1 |
| Total | | 34 | 12 |

=== International ===
List of international goals scored by Matthias Phaeton
| No. | Date | Venue | Opponent | Score | Result | Competition |
|---|---|---|---|---|---|---|
| 1 | 3 July 2021 | DRV PNK Stadium, Fort Lauderdale, United States | Bahamas | 1–0 | 2–0 | 2021 CONCACAF Gold Cup qualification |
| 2 | 6 July 2021 | DRV PNK Stadium, Fort Lauderdale, United States | Guatemala | 1–0 | 1–1 | 2021 CONCACAF Gold Cup qualification |
| 3 | 20 July 2021 | BBVA Stadium, Houston United States | Suriname | 1–1 | 1–2 | 2021 CONCACAF Gold Cup |
| 4 | 26 March 2022 | Stade Robert Bobin, Bondoufle, France | Martinique | 1–1 | 3–4 | Friendly |
| 5 | 13 June 2022 | Stade René Serge Nabajoth, Les Abymes, Guadeloupe | Barbados | 2–1 | 2–1 | 2022–23 CONCACAF Nations League B |
| 6 | 16 June 2023 | DRV PNK Stadium, Fort Lauderdale, United States | Antigua and Barbuda | 5–0 | 5–0 | 2023 CONCACAF Gold Cup qualification |
| 7 | 2 July 2023 | Shell Energy Stadium, Houston, United States | Cuba | 1–0 | 4–1 | 2023 CONCACAF Gold Cup |
| 8 | 2 July 2023 | Shell Energy Stadium, Houston, United States | Cuba | 3–0 | 4–1 | 2023 CONCACAF Gold Cup |
| 9 | 10 September 2023 | Stade de Valette, Sainte-Anne, Guadeloupe | Sint Maarten | 1–0 | 4–0 | 2023–24 CONCACAF Nations League B |
| 10 | 17 November 2023 | Wildey Turf, Wildey, Barbados | Sint Maarten | 0–2 | 0–2 | 2023–24 CONCACAF Nations League B |
| 11 | 19 November 2023 | Stade de Valette, Sainte-Anne, Guadeloupe | Saint Kitts and Nevis | 1–0 | 5–0 | 2023–24 CONCACAF Nations League B |
| 12 | 24 June 2025 | Shell Energy Stadium, Houston, United States | Guatemala | 2–3 | 2–3 | 2025 CONCACAF Gold Cup |
