= Youssouf M'Changama =

Footballer (born 1990)

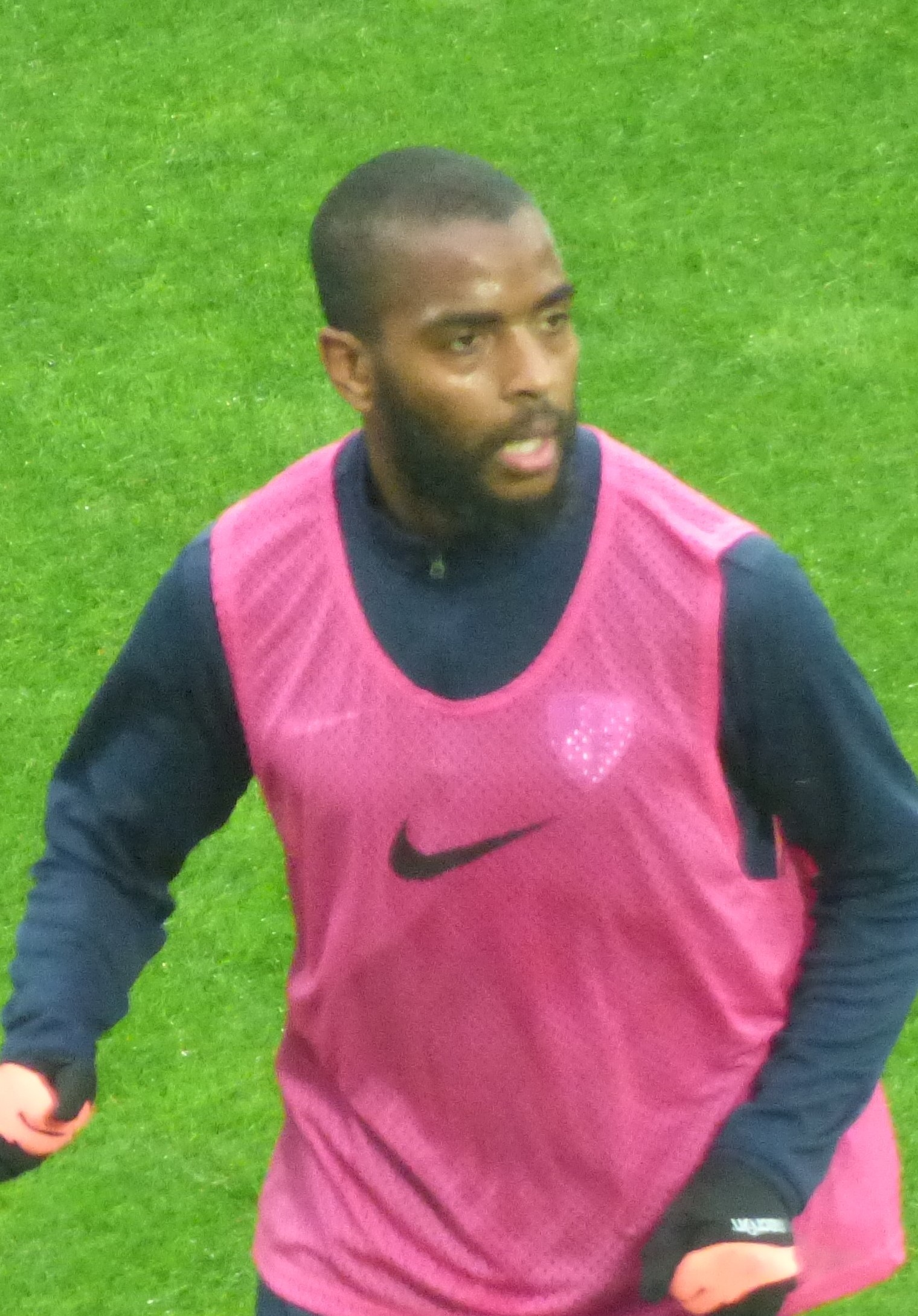
- M'Changama with Grenoble in 2018

Personal information
- Full name: Youssouf Yacoub M'Changama
- Date of birth: 29 August 1990 (age 36)
- Place of birth: Marseille, France
- Height: 1.75 m (5 ft 9 in)
- Position: Attacking midfielder

Team information
- Current team: Al-Batin
- Number: 10

Youth career
- Marseille
- 2006–2010: Sedan

Senior career*
Years	Team	Apps	(Gls)
2009–2010	Sedan B	10	(2)
2010–2011	Troyes B	24	(2)
2012–2013	Oldham Athletic	26	(2)
2013–2014	RC Arbaâ	13	(1)
2014	Uzès Pont du Gard	12	(1)
2014–2016	Marseille Consolat	52	(9)
2016–2018	Gazélec Ajaccio	68	(4)
2018–2019	Grenoble	43	(7)
2019–2022	Guingamp	91	(13)
2022–2023	Auxerre	26	(0)
2023–2025	Troyes	60	(3)
2025–	Al-Batin	28	(3)

International career^{‡}
2010–	Comoros	77	(16)
- * Club domestic league appearances and goals as of 22 April 2026 ‡ National team caps and goals as of 20:52, 29 December 2025 (UTC)

Youssouf Yacoub M'Changama (born 29 August 1990) is a professional footballer who plays as an attacking midfielder for Saudi club Al-Batin. Born in France, he plays for the Comoros national team.

He is Comoros national team's most capped player.

== Club career ==
M'Changama joined Oldham Athletic on 5 March 2012. He made his Latics, and Football League, debut as a substitute against Yeovil Town five days later, on 10 March 2012, making him the first Comorian ever to play for the club.

In the 2021–22 season with Guingamp, M'Changama was included in the UNFP Ligue 2 Team of the Year, and won the award for the best goal of the season. He ended the campaign with nine goals and fifteen assists to his name. On 16 June 2022, it was confirmed that M'Changama had signed a two-year contract, with an option for a further year, with newly-promoted Ligue 1 side Auxerre.

On 10 September 2025, M'Changama joined Saudi FDL club Al-Batin.

== International career ==
M'Changama holds French and Comorian nationalities. He is a player of the Comoros national team. On 24 January 2022, in a round of 16 match at the 2021 Africa Cup of Nations against hosts Cameroon, he scored a free kick in a 2–1 defeat.

On 11 December 2025, M'Changama was called up to the Comoros squad for the 2025 Africa Cup of Nations.

== Personal life ==
M'Changama's brother, Mohamed, is also a footballer.

== Career statistics ==
=== International ===
Scores and results list Comoros goal tally first, score column indicates score after each M'Changama goal.

List of international goals scored by Youssouf M'Changama
No.	Date	Venue	Opponent	Score	Result	Competition
1	5 March 2014	Stade Francis Turcan, Martigues, France	Burkina Faso	1–1	1–1	Friendly
2	27 March 2016	Francistown Stadium, Francistown, Botswana	Botswana	1–0	1–2	2017 Africa Cup of Nations qualification
3	6 October 2017	Stade El Menzah, Tunis, Tunisia	Mauritania	1–0	1–0	Friendly
4	11 November 2017	Stade Municipal Saint-Leu-la-Forêt, Paris, France	Madagascar	1–1	1–1	Friendly
5	24 March 2018	Stade de Marrakech, Marrakesh, Morocco	Kenya	1–1	2–2	Friendly
6	7 June 2019	Stade de la Libération, Boulogne-sur-Mer, France	Ivory Coast	1–3	1–3	Friendly
7	11 October 2020	Stade Olympique de Radès, Radès, Tunisia	Libya	2–1	2–1	Friendly
8	11 November 2020	Moi International Sports Centre, Kasarani, Kenya	Kenya	1–0	1–1	2021 Africa Cup of Nations qualification
9	7 September 2021	Stade Omnisports de Malouzini, Moroni, Comoros	Burundi	1–0	1–0	Friendly
10	24 January 2022	Olembe Stadium, Yaoundé, Cameroon	Cameroon	1–2	1–2	2021 Africa Cup of Nations
11	3 June 2022	Stade Omnisports de Malouzini, Moroni, Comoros	Lesotho	1–0	2–0	2023 Africa Cup of Nations qualification
12	17 June 2023	Orlando Stadium, Johannesburg, South Africa	Lesotho	1–0	1–0	2023 Africa Cup of Nations qualification
13	4 September 2024	Ben M'Hamed El Abdi Stadium, El Jadida, Morocco	Gambia	1–0	1–1	2025 Africa Cup of Nations qualification
14	9 September 2024	Hammadi Agrebi Stadium, Tunis, Tunisia	Madagascar	1–1	1–1	2025 Africa Cup of Nations qualification
15	7 September 2025	Meknes Honor Stadium, Meknes, Morocco	Central African Republic	1–0	2–0	2026 FIFA World Cup qualification
16	17 November 2025	Stade omnisports de Malouzini, Moroni, Comoros	Namibia	1–0	4–0	Friendly

== Honours ==
Individual

- UNFP Ligue 2 Team of the Year: 2021–22
