= Baptiste Roux =

French footballer (born 1999)

Personal information
- Full name: Baptiste Clément Julien Roux
- Date of birth: 26 November 1999 (age 26)
- Place of birth: Bressuire, France
- Height: 1.90 m (6 ft 3 in)
- Positions: Centre-back; defensive midfielder

Team information
- Current team: Universitatea Craiova (on loan from TSC)
- Number: 5

Youth career
- 2004–2012: Pouzauges Bocage
- 2012–2014: ESOF La Roche
- 2014–2018: Guingamp

Senior career*
Years	Team	Apps	(Gls)
2018–2020	Guingamp B	38	(4)
2020–2024	Guingamp	99	(4)
2024–2025	AVS	23	(1)
2025–	TSC	27	(0)
2026–	→ Universitatea Craiova (loan)	2	(0)
- * Club domestic league appearances and goals as of 26 October 2026

Baptiste Clément Julien Roux (born 26 November 1999) is a French professional footballer who plays a centre-back or a defensive midfielder for Liga I club Universitatea Craiova, on loan from Serbian First League club TSC.

== Career ==
=== Early life and youth career ===
Roux was born on 26 November 1999 in Bressuire, France. Roux did his youth career football in the academy of Guingamp.

=== Guingamp B ===
Roux signed his first senior contract with the B team of EA Guingamp in 2017. He made his debut on 28 April 2018 against Vannes OC. Baptiste started in the lineup for the match and was substituted in the 57th minute for Romain Le Méhauté. The match ended in a 1–1 draw. Roux played his last match of the season against the B team of US Concarneau on 21 April 2018 which ended 3–0 in favor of Guingamp.

Roux played his first match of the new season on 1 September 2018 against Stade Plabennécois which he played as a substitute for Matthias Phaëton during the 89th minute of the match. The game ended 2–1, Guingamp clinching the three points. Roux scored his debut goal for the club on 20 October 2018 in the match against Stade Pontivy during the 14th minute of the game. The match ended 2–0 in favor of Guingamp. Roux played his last match of the season against US Montagnarde on 20 April 2019 which ended with a score line of 2–0 with Guingamp taking the win.

Roux played his first match of the season against Vannes OC on 7 September 2019 which ended 4–1 with Guingamp losing the game. Roux scored his first goal of the season against US Saint-Malo on 19 October 2019 in the 47th minute of the game which ended in a 1–1 draw. Roux found his second goal of the season against AS Poissy on 14 December 2019. The match ended with a score line of 3–5 with Guingamp taking the three points. Roux played his last match of the season against US Granville on 7 March 2020 which ended 1–2 with Guingamp losing the match.

Roux played just one match in the season against the B team of Caen on 22 August 2020 where he scored a goal in the 88th minute. The match ended 3–1 in favor Guingamp. He was then promoted to the senior team in the middle of the season.

=== Guingamp ===
Roux signed his first pro contract and was promoted to the senior team of Guingamp from the reserve team in middle of the new season. Roux penned a three-year contract with the club. Roux made his debut against Pau FC on 19 September 2020. Roux was started as a substitute for Gueïda Fofana during the 74th minute of the game. The match ended 1–0 for Guingamp. He scored his debut goal for the senior team on 30 January 2021 in the second match of the season against Pau FC, which eventually ended in a 2–3 loss for Guingamp.

=== AVS ===
In July 2024, Roux joined newly-promoted Primeira Liga side AVS on a free transfer, signing a two-year deal.

== Personal life ==
Roux is a fan of Spain international and FC Barcelona veteran, Sergio Busquets.

== Career statistics ==
As of match played 29 October 2026

Appearances and goals by club, season and competition
Club	Season	League			National cup (Note: Includes Coupe de France, Taça de Portugal, Cupa României)		Europe		Other		Total	
Club	Season	Division	Apps	Goals	Apps	Goals	Apps	Goals	Apps	Goals	Apps	Goals
Guingamp B	2017–18	Championnat National 2	6	0	–		–		–		6	0
Guingamp B	2018–19	Championnat National 2	14	1	–		–		–		14	1
Guingamp B	2019–20	Championnat National 2	17	2	–		–		–		17	2
Guingamp B	2020–21	Championnat National 2	1	1	–		–		–		1	1
Guingamp B	Total		38	4	–		–		–		38	4
Guingamp	2020–21	Ligue 2	19	1	1	0	–		–		20	1
Guingamp	2021–22	Ligue 2	29	3	2	0	–		–		31	3
Guingamp	2022–23	Ligue 2	27	0	2	0	–		–		29	0
Guingamp	2023–24	Ligue 2	24	0	3	0	–		–		27	0
Guingamp	Total		99	4	8	0	–		–		107	4
AVS	2024–25	Primeira Liga	23	1	1	0	–		0	0	24	1
TSC	2025–26	Serbian SuperLiga	25	0	0	0	–		–		25	0
TSC	2026–27	Serbian First League	2	0	–		–		–		2	0
TSC	Total		27	0	0	0	–		–		27	0
Universitatea Craiova (loan)	2026–27	Liga I	2	0	2	1	0	0	–		4	1
Career total			189	9	11	1	0	0	0	0	200	10
