= Jérémy Livolant =

French footballer (born 1998)

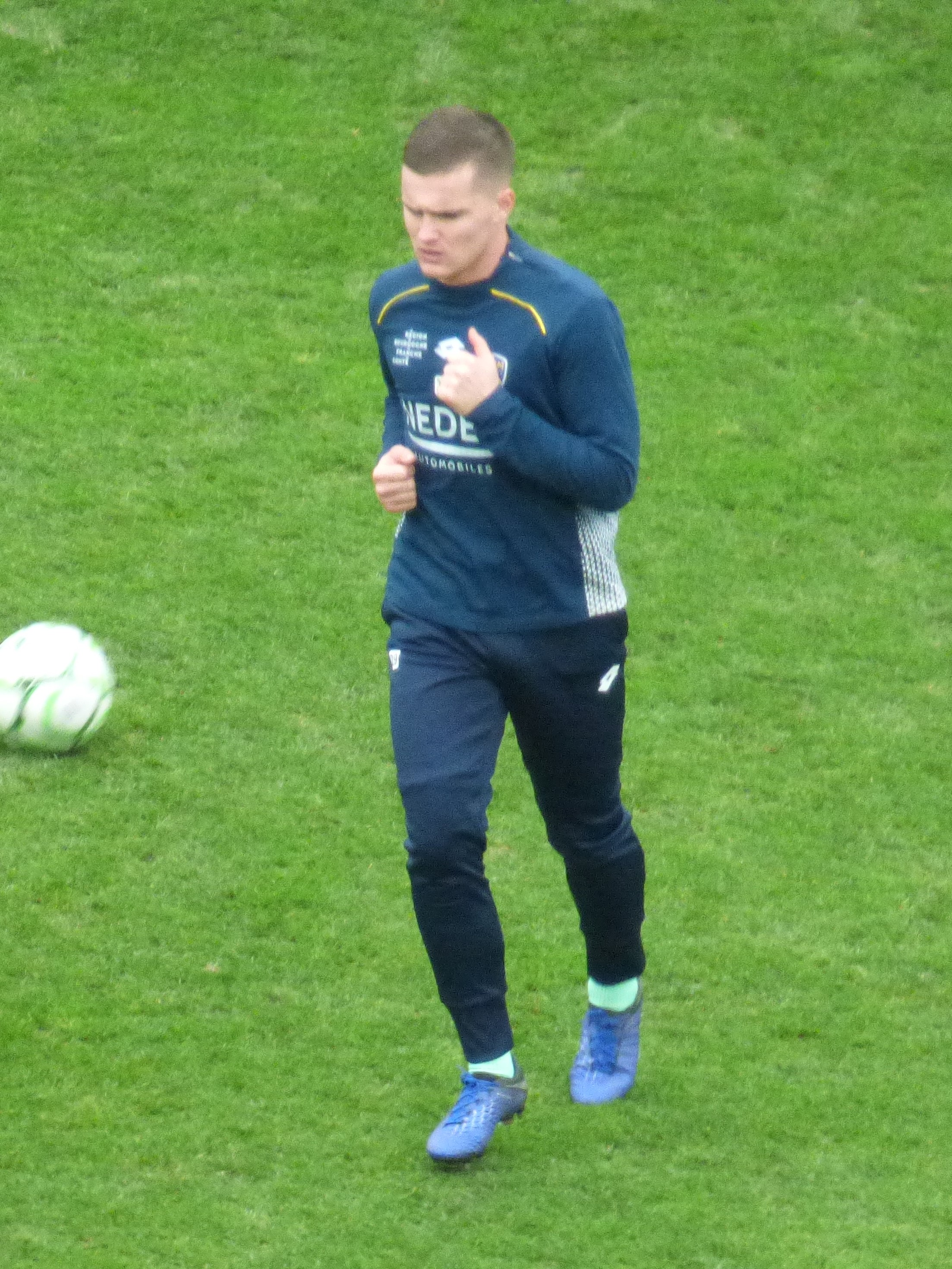
- Livolant in 2019

Personal information
- Date of birth: 9 January 1998 (age 28)
- Place of birth: Morlaix, France
- Height: 1.75 m (5 ft 9 in)
- Position: Winger

Team information
- Current team: Casa Pia
- Number: 29

Youth career
- 2004–2009: US Lanmeur
- 2009–2015: Guingamp

Senior career*
Years	Team	Apps	(Gls)
2015–2017	Guingamp B	46	(9)
2015–2023	Guingamp	112	(15)
2017–2018	→ Boulogne (loan)	31	(4)
2018–2019	→ Châteauroux (loan)	28	(1)
2018–2019	→ Châteauroux B (loan)	3	(1)
2019	→ Sochaux (loan)	12	(1)
2023–2024	Bordeaux	38	(5)
2024–	Casa Pia	59	(7)

International career
2013–2014	France U16	11	(0)
2016–2017	France U19	4	(0)
- * Club domestic league appearances and goals as of 18 May 2026

Jérémy Livolant (born 9 January 1998) is a French professional footballer who plays as a winger for Primeira Liga club Casa Pia.

== Club career ==
Livolant is a youth exponent from Guingamp. He made his Ligue 1 debut on 6 December 2015 against Bordeaux.

He scored his first professional goal with Guingamp on 19 October 2020 against Auxerre.

On 27 July 2023, Ligue 2 side Bordeaux announced the signing of Livolant on a three-year contract, for a reported fee of €1.2 million.

On 16 September 2024, Livolant moved to Portugal, signing a three-year contract with Primeira Liga club Casa Pia.
