= Dominique Youfeigane =

Footballer (born 2000)

Personal information
- Full name: Dominique Junior Youfeigane
- Date of birth: 7 February 2000 (age 26)
- Place of birth: Saint-Maurice, France
- Height: 1.88 m (6 ft 2 in)
- Position: Goalkeeper

Team information
- Current team: Manchester 62
- Number: 94

Youth career
- 2006–2015: Champigny FC 94
- 2015–2019: Guingamp

Senior career*
Years	Team	Apps	(Gls)
2017–2023	Guingamp B	44	(0)
2021–2023	Guingamp	8	(0)
2023–2024	Lorient B	2	(0)
2024–	Manchester 62	24	(0)

International career^{‡}
2018	France U18	2	(0)
2018	France U19	1	(0)
2023–	Central African Republic	13	(0)
- * Club domestic league appearances and goals as of 2 May 2025 ‡ National team caps and goals as of 19 March 2025

Dominique Junior Youfeigane (born 7 February 2000) is a professional footballer who plays as a goalkeeper for Gibraltar Football League side Manchester 62. Born in France, he plays for the Central African Republic national team.

== Club career ==
Youfeigane is a youth academy graduate of Guingamp. He made his senior debut for the club on 13 November 2021 in 8–0 cup win against sixth division side US Liffré. He made his professional debut a week later on 20 November in a 2–0 league defeat against Pau.

On 20 July 2023, Youfeigane joined Lorient on a one-year deal. Following his release the next summer, he joined Gibraltar Football League club Manchester 62 on 19 August 2024.

== International career ==
Born in France, Youfeigane is of Central African Republic descent. He is a former French youth national team player. He has appeared in friendlies for under-18 and under-19 national teams.

== Career statistics ==
=== Club ===
As of 20 November 2021

Appearances and goals by club, season and competition
Club	Season	League			Cup		Continental		Total	
Club	Season	Division	Apps	Goals	Apps	Goals	Apps	Goals	Apps	Goals
Guingamp II	2017–18	Championnat National 3	3	0	—		—		3	0
Guingamp II	2018–19	Championnat National 3	14	0	—		—		14	0
Guingamp II	2019–20	Championnat National 2	14	0	—		—		14	0
Guingamp II	2020–21	Championnat National 2	8	0	—		—		8	0
Guingamp II	2021–22	Championnat National 2	2	0	—		—		2	0
Guingamp II	Total		41	0	0	0	0	0	41	0
Guingamp	2021–22	Ligue 2	1	0	1	0	—		2	0
Career total			42	0	1	0	0	0	43	0

=== International ===
As of match played 19 March 2025

Appearances and goals by national team and year
National team	Year	Apps	Goals
Central African Republic	2023	5	0
Central African Republic	2024	7	0
Central African Republic	2025	1	0
Total		13	0
