= Maxime Barthelmé =

French footballer (born 1988)

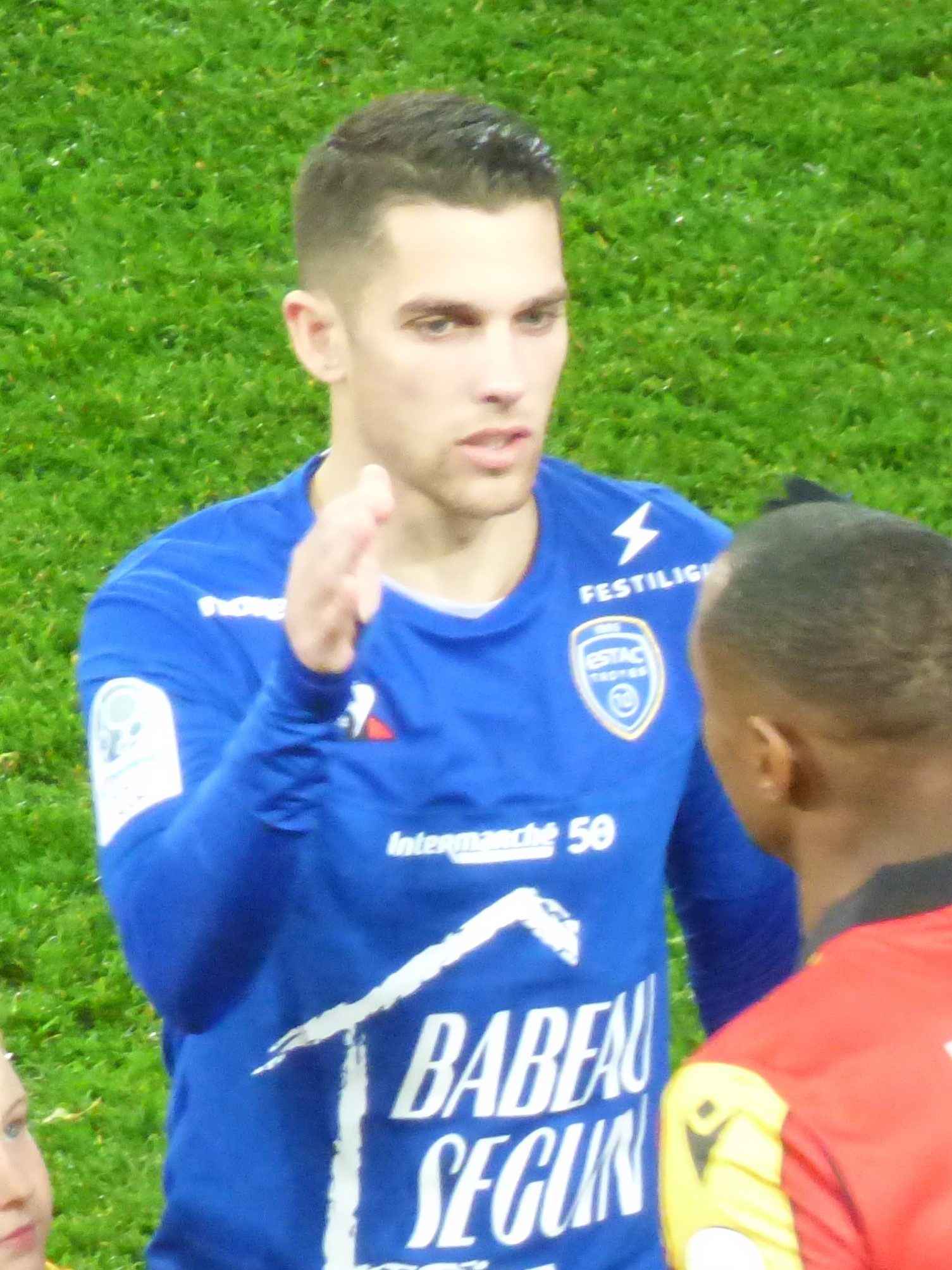
- Barthelmé with Troyes AC in February 2020

Personal information
- Date of birth: 8 September 1988 (age 38)
- Place of birth: Sartrouville, France
- Height: 1.77 m (5 ft 10 in)
- Position: Midfielder

Team information
- Current team: Guingamp
- Number: 28

Senior career*
Years	Team	Apps	(Gls)
2007–2009	RCF Paris	18	(1)
2009–2017	Lorient	109	(3)
2010–2017	Lorient B	26	(7)
2010–2011	→ Paris FC (loan)	24	(1)
2017–2019	Châteauroux	68	(7)
2019–2021	Troyes	55	(1)
2021–	Guingamp	59	(3)
- * Club domestic league appearances and goals as of 27 June 2024

Maxime Barthelmé (French pronunciation: [maksim baʁtɛlme]; born 8 September 1988) is a French professional footballer who plays as a midfielder

== Career ==
In August 2017 Barthelmé left FC Lorient after seven seasons with over 100 Ligue 1 appearances for the club to sign a two-year contract with LB Châteauroux, newly promoted to Ligue 2.

In June 2019, Barthelmé signed a three-year contract with Troyes AC.

On 5 July 2021, he joined Guingamp on a two-year contract.
