= Yannick Gomis =

Senegalese footballer

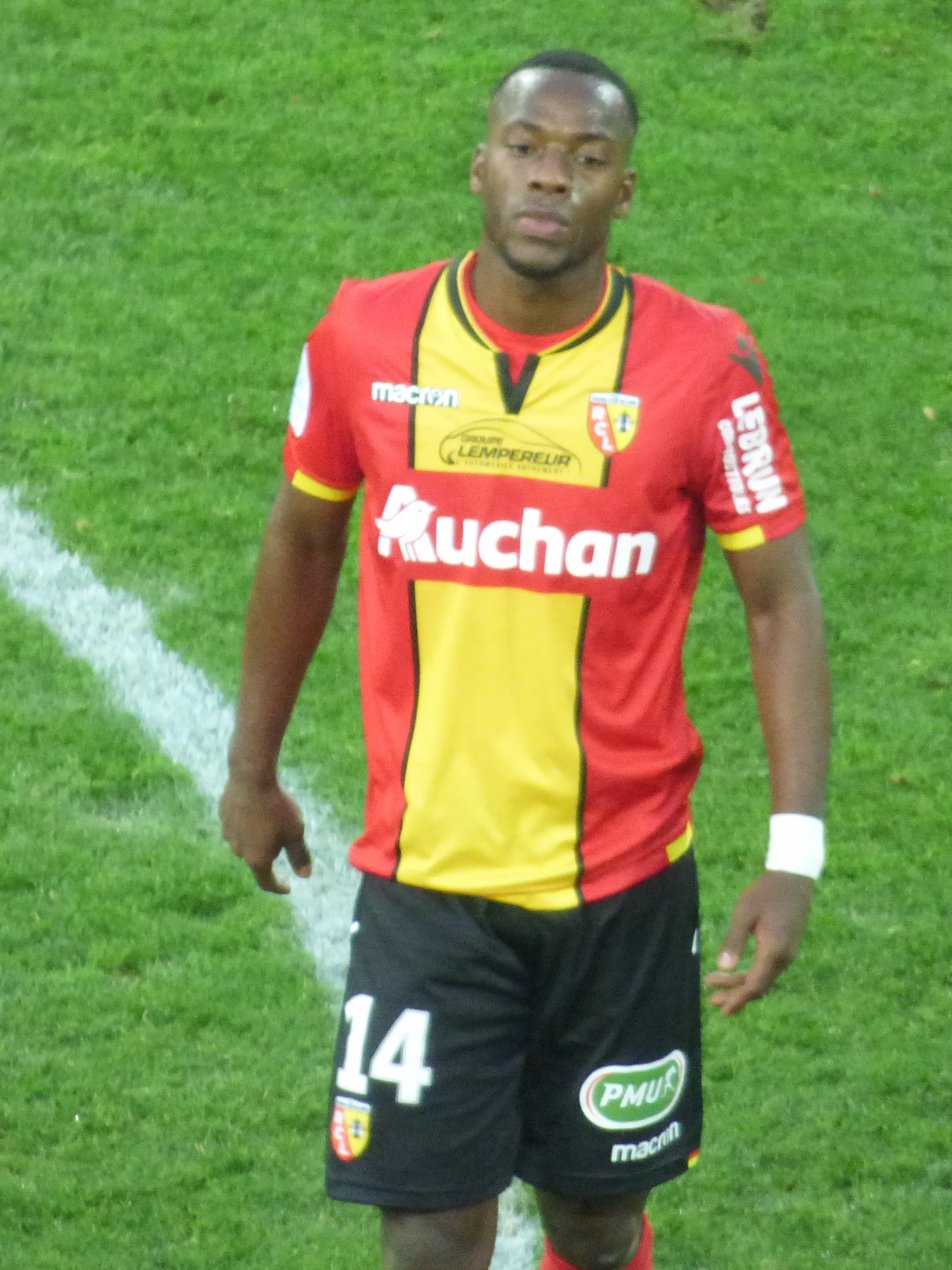
- Gomis playing for Lens in 2018

Personal information
- Full name: Yannick Arthur Gomis
- Date of birth: 3 February 1992 (age 34)
- Place of birth: Dakar, Senegal
- Height: 1.80 m (5 ft 11 in)
- Position: Forward

Team information
- Current team: AEL Limassol
- Number: 14

Senior career*
Years	Team	Apps	(Gls)
2010–2015	Ngor		
2015–2018	Orléans	61	(17)
2018–2019	Lens	44	(17)
2018–2022	Guingamp	94	(17)
2022–2026	Aris Limassol	121	(32)
2026–	AEL Limassol	1	(1)

International career
2013	Senegal	2	(1)
- * Club domestic league appearances and goals as of 01:05, 31 August 2026 (UTC)

Yannick Arthur Gomis (born 3 February 1992) is a Senegalese professional footballer who plays as a forward for Cypriot First Division club AEL Limassol. He made two appearances for the Senegal national team scoring once.

== Club career ==
Gomis began his career in his native Senegal with Olympique de Ngor and won two caps for the Senegal national team in 2013 before joining Orléans in the summer of 2015.

On 30 June 2022, Gomis signed with Aris Limassol in Cyprus.

== Career statistics ==
As of match played on 8 March 2026

Appearances and goals by club, season and competition
Club	Season	League			National cup		League cup		Continental		Other		Total	
Club	Season	Division	Apps	Goals	Apps	Goals	Apps	Goals	Apps	Goals	Apps	Goals	Apps	Goals
Orléans	2015–16	Championnat National	15	0	—		—		—		—		15	0
Orléans	2016–17	Ligue 2	16	5	0	0	2	0	—		—		18	5
Orléans	2017–18	Ligue 2	31	12	0	0	2	0	—		—		33	12
Orléans	Total		61	17	1	0	4	0	—		—		66	17
Lens	2018–19	Ligue 2	42	17	1	0	1	0	—		—		44	17
Lens	2019–20	Ligue 2	2	0	0	0	1	0	—		—		3	0
Lens	Total		44	17	1	0	2	0	—		—		47	17
Guingamp	2019–20	Ligue 2	22	5	1	0	0	0	—		—		23	5
Guingamp	2020–21	Ligue 2	37	9	1	0	0	0	—		—		38	9
Guingamp	2021–22	Ligue 2	35	3	3	2	0	0	—		—		38	5
Guingamp	Total		94	17	5	2	0	0	—		—		99	19
Aris Limassol	2022–23	Cypriot First Division	28	8	1	0	—		2	1	—		31	9
Aris Limassol	2023–24	Cypriot First Division	32	10	4	1	—		11	6	0	0	47	17
Aris Limassol	2024–25	Cypriot First Division	35	10	1	1	—		—		—		36	11
Aris Limassol	2025–26	Cypriot First Division	26	4	1	0	—		1	0	—		28	4
Aris Limassol	Total		121	32	7	2	—		14	7	0	0	138	41
Career total			317	82	13	4	6	0	14	7	0	0	350	94

== Honours ==
Aris Limassol

- Cypriot First Division: 2022–23
