= Stade de Roudourou =

Stadium in Guingamp, France

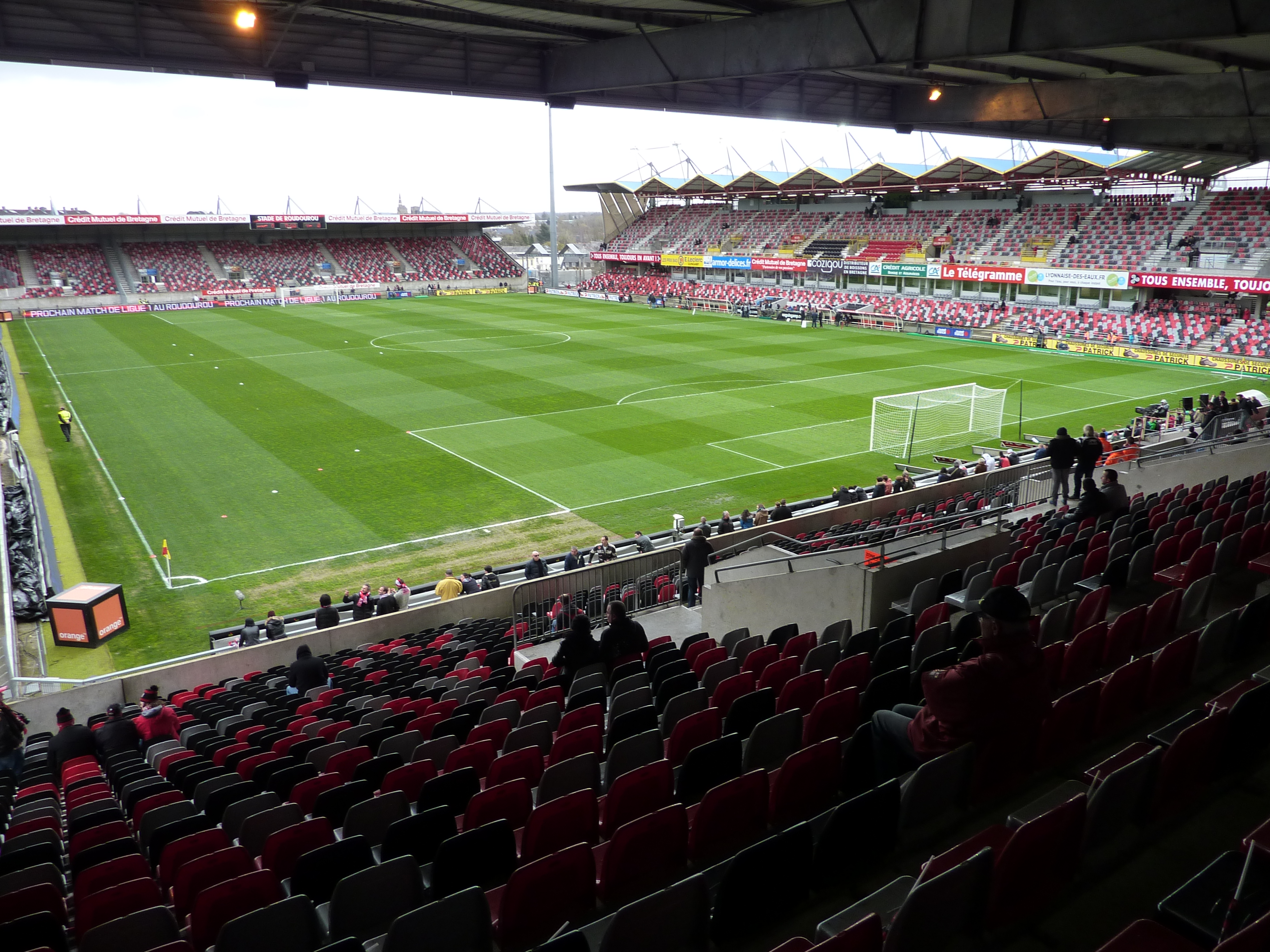
- Interactive map of Stade de Roudourou
- Location: Guingamp, France
- Coordinates: 48°33′59″N 3°09′53″W
- Capacity: 19,033
- Surface: Desso GrassMaster
- Record attendance: 19,003 (18 August 2018 v Paris SG)

Construction
- Opened: 1990
- Renovated: 1997, 2007, 2014, 2018

Tenant
- En Avant Guingamp

The Stade municipal de Roudourou (French pronunciation: [stad mynisipal də ʁuduʁu]) is a stadium in Guingamp, France, that is the home ground of Ligue 2 side En Avant Guingamp.

It is located in the district from which it takes its name. The name Roudourou comes from the Breton roudour meaning "ford", of which it is the plural.

== History ==
The building work on the stadium began in 1989, and was inaugurated on 21 January 1990 with a match against Paris Saint Germain. The stands consisted of the Presidential stand, which was the only stand with seating, the Tribune d'honneur, opposite the Presidential, was standing terraces, the goal ends had no roof, in fact behind the eastern end, it was just a grassy slope.

In 1997 the next phase of renovation took place, with the west stand having a roof and seating, the east stand having a proper stand with seating, but still no roof, and the Tribune d'honneur being converted to all seating.

in 2007, the next phase started, the lateral west was finally given its roof, and the Tribune d'honneur was completely rebuilt, with an increased capacity, and an upper tier with an improved press gallery.

In 2014 the floodlights were upgraded to coincide with EAG's qualification for the Europa League.

The stadium is able to hold 19,033 people following a renovation in 2018.

On 10 October 2009, it hosted the France national football team as they defeated the Faroe Islands 5–0 in qualification for the 2010 FIFA World Cup. The win secured France's place in the play-offs. On 11 October 2018 the stadium hosted the France national football team in a friendly match against Iceland.

In the 2024–25 UEFA Champions League season, the Stade de Roudourou hosted Brest's home matches due to the Stade Francis-Le Blé in Brest not being up to UEFA standards.

== See also ==
- List of football stadiums in France
- Lists of stadiums
