= 2023–24 Rodez AF season =

Rodez AF
2023–24 season
- Chairman: Pierre-Olivier Murat
- Manager: Didier Santini
- Stadium: Stade Paul-Lignon
- Ligue 2: 9th
- Coupe de France: 8th Round
Home colours	Away colours	Third colours
- All statistics correct as of 5 August 2023.

The 2023–24 season is Rodez Aveyron Football's 114th season in existence and their 5th year in the Ligue 2. They are also competing in the Coupe de France.

== Players ==
=== First-team squad ===
As of 26 July 2023.

Note: Flags indicate national team as defined under FIFA eligibility rules; some limited exceptions apply. Players may hold more than one non-FIFA nationality.

No.	Pos.	Nation	Player
1	GK	FRA	Sébastien Cibois
2	DF	FRA	Éric Vandenabeele
5	DF	TOG	Kévin Boma
6	DF	CMR	Ahmad Ngouyamsa
7	MF	CMR	Wilitty Younoussa
8	MF	FRA	Lorenzo Rajot
9	FW	KOR	Park Jung-bin
10	MF	FRA	Waniss Taïbi
11	FW	GBS	Joseph Mendes
12	FW	FRA	Kilian Corredor
14	MF	FRA	Bradley Danger
15	DF	FRA	Serge-Philippe Raux-Yao
16	GK	COD	Lionel Mpasi

No.	Pos.	Nation	Player
17	FW	BEN	Andréas Hountondji (on loan from Caen)
18	MF	FRA	Antoine Valério
19	DF	FRA	Lucas Buadés
21	DF	FRA	Joris Chougrani
23	FW	GEO	Nikoloz Kutateladze
24	MF	FRA	Giovanni Haag
25	FW	FRA	Clément Depres
26	FW	FRA	Yanis Verdier
28	DF	COM	Akim Abdallah
29	DF	FRA	Grégory Coelho
30	GK	FRA	Enzo Crombez
—	FW	FRA	Hatim Far

== Competitions ==
=== Overall record ===
Competition	First match	Last match	Starting round	Record							
Competition	First match	Last match	Starting round	Pld	W	D	L	GF	GA	GD	Win %
Ligue 2	5 August 2023	May 2024	Matchday 1	16	6	5	5	26	23	+3	37.50
Coupe de France	18 November 2023		Seventh round	1	1	0	0	3	0	+3	100.00
Total				17	7	5	5	29	23	+6	41.18

Last updated: 2 December 2023
Source: Soccerway

=== Ligue 2 ===
==== League table ====
Pos	Team	Pld	W	D	L	GF	GA	GD	Pts	Promotion or Relegation
2	Angers (P)	38	20	8	10	56	42	+14	68	Promotion to Ligue 1
3	Saint-Étienne (O, P)	38	19	8	11	48	31	+17	65	Qualification for promotion play-offs final
4	Rodez	38	16	12	10	62	51	+11	60	Qualification for promotion play-offs semi-final
5	Paris FC	38	16	11	11	49	42	+7	59	Qualification for promotion play-offs semi-final
6	Caen	38	17	7	14	51	45	+6	58	

Updated to match(es) played on 17 May 2024. Source: Ligue 2
Rules for classification: 1) Points; 2) Goal difference; 3) Number of goals scored; 4) Head-to-head goal difference; 5) Fair play points
(O) Play-off winners; (P) Promoted

==== Results summary ====
Overall								Home						Away					
Pld	W	D	L	GF	GA	GD	Pts	W	D	L	GF	GA	GD	W	D	L	GF	GA	GD
38	16	12	10	62	51	+11	60	10	6	3	35	22	+13	6	6	7	27	29	−2

Last updated: 17 May 2024.

==== Results by round ====
Round	1	2	3	4	5	6	7	8	9	10	11	12	13	14	15	16	17	18	19	20	21	22	23	24	25	26	27	28	29	30	31	32	33	34	35	36	37	38
Ground	A	H	A	H	A	H	A	H	A	H	H	A	A	H	A	H	A	H	A	H	A	H	A	H	A	A	H	A	H	A	H	A	H	H	A	H	A	H
Result	D	W	L	L	D	W	W	W	L	W	D	D	L	D	L	W	L	D	W	W	D	L	L	D	W	W	D	D	W	W	D	L	W	W	W	L	D	W
Position	6	6	12	15	14	8	6	4	7	6	6	6	9	9	9	9	9	11	9	7	8	11	12	12	9	7	7	6	5	5	5	5	5	4	4	4	4	4

Updated to match(es) played on 17 May 2024. Source:
A = Away; H = Home; W = Win; D = Draw; L = Loss

==== Matches ====
The league fixtures were unveiled on 29 June 2023.

5 August 2023 1	Ajaccio	1–1	Rodez	Ajaccio
19:00 UTC+2	Touzghar 45+5'; Youssouf (yellow card) 86'	Report	Rajot 6'; Ngouyamsa (yellow card) 18'; Younoussa (yellow card) 27'; Abdallah (yellow card) 76'	Stadium: Stade François Coty; Referee: Mikaël Lesage

12 August 2023 2	Rodez	2–1	Saint-Étienne	Rodez
16:00 UTC+2	Valério 41'; Buadés 90+5'	Report	Sissoko 58' (pen.); Briançon (yellow card) 72'; Chambost (yellow card) 90+1'	Stadium: Stade Paul-Lignon; Referee: Abdelatif Kherradji

19 August 2023 3	Laval	1–0	Rodez	Laval
19:00 CEST	Roye (yellow card) 60'; Baldé 81' (yellow card) 84'	Report		Stadium: Stade Francis Le Basser; Attendance: 6,901; Referee: (France) Aurélien Petit

26 August 2023 4	Rodez	0–1	Valenciennes	Rodez
19:00 CEST	Ngouyamsa (yellow card) 66'; Arconte (yellow card) 75'	Report	Boutoutaou 6'; Bonnet (yellow card) 58'; Tidyane Diagouraga (yellow card) 74'; Jordan Poha (yellow card) 85'	Stadium: Stade Paul-Lignon; Attendance: 2,444; Referee: (France) Guillaume Paradis

2 September 2023 5	Pau	2–2	Rodez	Bizanos
19:00 CEST	Sylla (yellow card) 22' (goal) 29' 45+5'; Ruiz (yellow card) 37'; Obiang (yellow card) 90+4'; Batisse (yellow card) 90+7'	Report	Haag (yellow card) 55' (goal) 63'; Danger (yellow card) 75' (goal) 90+7' (pen.); Depres (yellow card) 90+2'	Stadium: Nouste Camp; Attendance: 2,731; Referee: (France) Marc Bollengier

16 September 2023 6	Rodez	4–1	Angers	Rodez
19:00 CEST	Haag (yellow card) 45+5'; Corredor 46'; Taïbi 49'; Ngouyamsa (yellow card) 83'; Hountondji 86'; Rajot 88'	Report	Diony 2'; Bahoya (yellow card) 52'; Fofana (yellow card) 81'	Stadium: Stade Paul-Lignon; Attendance: 2,722; Referee: (France) Bastien Dechepy

23 September 2023 7	Dunkerque	1–2	Rodez	Dunkirk
19:00 CEST	Gambor (yellow card) 44'; Bilingi 55'	Report	Thiam 16' (o.g.); Raux-Yao (yellow card) 39'; Hountondji 67'; Mpasi (yellow card) 79'	Stadium: Stade Marcel-Tribut; Attendance: 3,055; Referee: (France) Pierre Legat

26 September 2023 8	Rodez	2–1	Troyes	Rodez
20:45 CEST	Chougrani (yellow card) 41'; Corredor 52'; Buadés 78'	Report	Zoukrou (yellow card) 10'; Diop (yellow card) 86'; Chavalerin 90+4'	Stadium: Stade Paul-Lignon; Attendance: 2,613; Referee: (France) Mickaël Leleu

30 September 2023 9	Auxerre	3–1	Rodez	Auxerre
19:00 CEST	Hein 33'; Mensah (yellow card) 55'; Perrin 72'; Raveloson 90+5'	Report	Corredor (yellow card) 6' (goal) 90+5'; Younoussa (yellow card) 51'; Haag (yellow card) 70'	Stadium: Stade de l'Abbé-Deschamps; Attendance: 14,421; Referee: (France) Faouzi Benchabane

7 October 2023 10	Rodez	5–3	Caen	Rodez
19:00 CEST	Rajot 4'; Arconte 13' 71' 76' (yellow card) 84'; Abdallah (yellow card) 23'; Haag (yellow card) 42'; Younoussa 90+2'	Report	Thomas 42'; Alexandre Mendy 45+1'; Le Bihan 45+4'; Court (yellow card) 63'; Henry (yellow card) 74'; Ntim (yellow card) 90+5'	Stadium: Stade Paul-Lignon; Attendance: 2,892; Referee: (France) Romain Delpech

21 October 2023 11	Rodez	1–1	Bastia	Rodez
19:00	Depres 67'; Rajot (yellow card) 73'	Report	Conte 3'; Ducrocq (yellow card) 55'; Placide (yellow card) 74'	Stadium: Stade Paul-Lignon; Attendance: 3,079; Referee: (France) Abdelatif Kherradji

28 October 2023 12	Bordeaux	2–2	Rodez	Bordeaux
15:00 CEST	Barbet 13' (pen.); Weissbeck 18' (yellow card) 61'; Davitashvili (yellow card) 25'; Sissokho (yellow card) 28'; Cassubie (yellow card) 44'; Elis (red card) 90+7'	Report	Abdallah (yellow card) 11'; Arconte 33'; Hountondji 79'; Mpasi (red card) 89'; Ngouyamsa (yellow card) 90+7'	Stadium: Matmut Atlantique; Attendance: 30,098; Referee: (France) Benoît Millot

4 November 2023 13	Quevilly-Rouen	3–1	Rodez	Le Petit-Quevilly
19:00 CET	Coulibaly 22'; Pierret (yellow card) 31'; Delaurier-Chaubet 40'; Soumano 71'; Camara (yellow card) 87'	Report	Hountondji 27'	Stadium: Stade Robert Diochon; Attendance: 2,463; Referee: (France) Ahmed Taleb

11 November 2023 14	Rodez	0–0	Guingamp	Rodez
19:00		Report	Sidibé (yellow card) 24'	Stadium: Stade Paul-Lignon; Attendance: 2,888; Referee: (France) Bastien Dechepy

25 November 2023 15	Grenoble	2–1	Rodez	Grenoble
19:00	Benet (yellow card) 14'; Diarra 43'; Postolachi 84'	Report	Haag (yellow card) 28'; Arconte 45+2' (yellow card) 45+3'; Valério (yellow card) 90+2'	Stadium: Stade des Alpes; Attendance: 6,763; Referee: (France) Mikael Lesage

2 December 2023 16	Rodez	2–0	Concarneau	Rodez
19:00	Danger 15' (yellow card) 54'; Hountondji 62'; Haag (yellow card) 70'	Report	Salles (yellow card) 7'; Chadli (yellow card) 54'; Lebeau (yellow card) 65'; Merdji (yellow card) 90+6'	Stadium: Stade Paul-Lignon; Attendance: 2,823; Referee: (France) Karim Abed

5 December 2023 17	Paris FC	2–0	Rodez	Paris
20:45 CET (UTC+1)	Hamel 1' 23'; Dabila (yellow card) 30'; Mandouki (yellow card) 35'	Report	Chougrani (yellow card) 39'	Stadium: Stade Sébastien Charléty; Attendance: 4,675; Referee: (France) Mickaël Leleu

16 December 2023 18	Rodez	2–2	Amiens SC	Rodez
19:00 CET (UTC+1)	Chougrani (yellow card) 45+3'; Corredor 48' 57'; Depres (yellow card) 50'; Younoussa (yellow card) 90+3'	Report	Carroll 26'; Ring (yellow card) 61'; Leautey 73'	Stadium: Stade Paul-Lignon; Attendance: 2,809; Referee: (France) Pierre Legat

19 December 2023 19	Annecy	1–2	Rodez	Annecy
20:45 CET (UTC+1)	Antoine Larose 55'; Yacouba Barry (yellow card) 58'; Billemaz (yellow card) 82'	Report	Hountondji 8'; Haag (yellow card) 41'; Raux-Yao (yellow card) 58'; Rajot 66'; Lipinski (yellow card) 88'; Depres (yellow card) 90'	Stadium: Parc des Sports; Attendance: 6,501; Referee: (France) Pierre Gaillouste

13 January 2024 20	Rodez	2–1	Pau	Rodez
19:00 CET (UTC+1)	Chougrani (yellow card) 20'; Abdallah 53'; Danger (yellow card) 84' (yellow-red card) 88'; Younoussa 90+5'	Report	Ruiz (yellow card) 29'; Mouton (yellow card) 72'; Sylla 88' (pen.)	Stadium: Stade Paul-Lignon; Attendance: 2,913; Referee: (France) Mikael Lesage

23 January 2024 21	Guingamp	3–3	Rodez	Guingamp
20:45 CET (UTC+1)	Picard 1'; Sagna 26' (yellow card) 56'; Guillaume 31'	Report	Hountondji 3' 8'; Danger 45+2' (pen.); Raun-Yao (yellow card) 68'	Stadium: Stade de Roudourou; Attendance: 7,545; Referee: (France) Abdelatif Kherradji

27 January 2024 22	Rodez	1–2	Laval	Rodez
19:00 CET (UTC+1)	Hountondji 66'; Haag (yellow card) 90+4'; Buadés (yellow card) 90+4'	Report	Baudry (yellow card) 26'; Bobichon 59'; Thomas (yellow card) 86'; Adéoti (yellow card) 87'; Tell (yellow card) 90+1'; Diaw 90+6'	Stadium: Stade Paul-Lignon; Attendance: 2,677; Referee: (France) Rémi Landry

3 February 2024 23	Angers	2–1	Rodez	Angers
19:00 CET (UTC+1)	Lopy 45+2' (yellow card) 90+3'; El Melali 52'; Ferhat (yellow card) 90'	Report	Corredor 4'; Abdallah (yellow card) 45+4'; Depres (yellow card) 63'; Danger (yellow card) 81'	Stadium: Stade Raymond Kopa; Attendance: 8,473; Referee: (France) Karim Abed

10 February 2024 24	Rodez	0–0	Dunkerque	Rodez
19:00 CET (UTC+1)	Arconte (yellow card) 19' (yellow-red card) 51'	Report	Courtet (yellow card) 90+2'	Stadium: Stade Paul-Lignon; Attendance: 2,829; Referee: (France) Aurélien Petit

17 February 2024 25	Bastia	0–2	Rodez	Furiani
19:00 CET (UTC+1)	Vincent (yellow card) 45+2'; Alfarela (yellow card) 68'; Bianchini (yellow card) 90+6'	Report	Haag 35' (yellow card) 90+6'; Hountondji 55'	Stadium: Stade Armand-Cesari; Attendance: 10,883; Referee: (France) Bastien Dechepy

24 February 2024 26	Valenciennes	0–2	Rodez	Valenciennes
19:00 CET (UTC+1)	Souleymane Basse (yellow card) 48'	Report	Corredor 43'; Yannis Verdier 84'	Stadium: Stade du Hainaut; Attendance: 9,315; Referee: (France) Ahmed Taleb

2 March 2024 27	Rodez	2–2	Bordeaux	Rodez
19:00 CET (UTC+1)	Corredor 26'; Lipinski 45+2'	Report	Ekomié (yellow card) 7'; Davitashvili 18'; Ihnatenko 90+4'	Stadium: Stade Paul-Lignon; Attendance: 3,263; Referee: (France) Clément Turpin

9 March 2024 28	Amiens SC	1–1	Rodez	Amiens
19:00 CET (UTC+1)	Mafouta (yellow card) 33' (goal) 43'; Corchia (yellow card) 59'; Boya (yellow card) 90'	Report	Danger 35' (pen.); Raux-Yao (yellow card) 65' (yellow-red card) 90+7'	Stadium: Stade de la Licorne; Attendance: 5,890; Referee: (France) Guillaume Paradis

16 March 2024 29	Rodez	3–1	Grenoble Foot 38	Rodez
19:00 CET (UTC+1)	Corredor 21'; Haag (yellow card) 45'; Hountondji 54' 61'; Ngouyamsa (yellow card) 75'	Report	Sylvestre (yellow card) 6'; Valls 16' (yellow card) 45+3'; Joseph (yellow card) 39'	Stadium: Stade Paul-Lignon; Attendance: 2,979; Referee: (France) Benjamin Lepaysant

30 March 2024 30	Troyes	2–3	Rodez	Troyes
19:00 CET (UTC+1)	Chavalerin 72'; Dong 81'	Report	Rajot 45'; Arconte 46'; Taïbi 57'; Haag (yellow card) 90+1'	Stadium: Stade de l'Aube; Attendance: 4,752; Referee: (France) Ruddy Buquet

6 April 2024 31	Rodez	3–3	Quevilly-Rouen	Rodez
19:00 CET (UTC+1)	Corredor 7' 20' (yellow card) 68'; Boma (yellow card) 46' (yellow-red card) 72' (goal) 49'	Report	Camara 45+3'; Pendant (yellow card) 47'; Pierret (yellow card) 51'; Coulibaly 68' (yellow card) 68' (goal) 90+2'	Stadium: Stade Paul-Lignon; Attendance: 3,106; Referee: (France) Rémi Landry

13 April 2024 32	Caen	1–0	Rodez	Caen
19:00 CET (UTC+1)	Traoré (yellow card) 34'; Sylla 45' (o.g.); Henry (yellow card) 83'	Report		Stadium: Stade Michel d'Ornano; Attendance: 17,250; Referee: (France) Olivier Thual

20 April 2024 33	Rodez	2–0	Auxerre	Rodez
15:00 CET (UTC+1)	Danger 56' (pen.) (yellow card) 73'; Akpa 80' (o.g.); Arconte (yellow card) 80'	Report		Stadium: Stade Paul-Lignon; Attendance: 3,263; Referee: (France) Florent Batta

23 April 2024 34	Rodez	1–0	Paris FC	Rodez
20:45 CET (UTC+1)	Kolodziejczak 36' (o.g.); Younoussa (yellow card) 40'	Report		Stadium: Stade Paul-Lignon; Attendance: 3,100; Referee: (France) Thierry Bouille

27 April 2024 35	Concarneau	1–2	Rodez	Brest
19:00 CET (UTC+1)	Chadli (yellow card) 73'; Thibault Sinquin 90+4'	Report	Raux-Yao (yellow card) 53'; Younoussa 60'; Corredor 69'	Stadium: Stade Francis-Le Blé; Attendance: 1,141; Referee: (France) Aurélien Petit

3 May 2024 36	Rodez	1–3	Annecy	Rodez
20:00 CET (UTC+1)	Hountondji 63'	Report	Antoine Larose 20'; Camara 57'; Hamjatou Soukouna (yellow card) 65'; Djoco 67'	Stadium: Stade Paul-Lignon; Attendance: 3,159; Referee: (France) Jérémy Stinat

10 May 2024 37	Saint-Étienne	1–1	Rodez	Saint-Étienne
20:45 CET (UTC+1)	Nadé 38'; Appiah (yellow card) 43'; Cafaro (yellow card) 50'; Maçon (yellow card) 82'	Report	Mambo (yellow card) 31'; Abdallah (yellow card) 77'; Rajot 79'	Stadium: Stade Geoffroy-Guichard; Attendance: 35,701; Referee: (France) Mikael Lesage

17 May 2024 38	Rodez	2–0	Ajaccio	Rodez
20:45 CET (UTC+1)	Haag 2'; Hountondji 6'	Report	Vidal (yellow card) 50'	Stadium: Stade Paul-Lignon; Attendance: 3,157; Referee: (France) Abdelatif Kherradji

==== Promotion Playoff ====
21 May 2024 Semi Final	Rodez	2 - 2 (3 – 2 p)	Paris FC	Rodez
20:30 CEST	Danger 9' (pen.); Corredor 33'; Younoussa (yellow card) 90'; Mambo (yellow card) 90+4'	Report	Dicko 4'; Mbow (yellow card) 37' (yellow-red card) 47'; Kolodziejczak (yellow card) 54'; Camara (yellow card) 69'; Riou (yellow card) 70'; Dabila 90+6'	Stadium: Stade Paul-Lignon; Attendance: 3,115; Referee: (France) Hakim Ben El Hadj

24 May 2024 Final	Saint-Étienne	2 - 0	Rodez	Saint-Étienne
20:30 CEST	Cardona 64'; Bentayg (yellow card) 86'; Mbuku 90+6'	Report	Haag (yellow card) 53'	Stadium: Stade Geoffroy-Guichard; Attendance: 36,048; Referee: (France) Thomas Léonard

=== Coupe de France ===
18 November 2023 Seventh round	US Liffré	0–3	Rodez

9 December 2023 Eighth round	Stade Mayennais FC	0–9	Rodez	Mayenne
15:00		Report	Depres 5' (pen.); Corredor 25' 45' 60'; Valério 50' 54'; Hountondji 69'; Mambo 75'; Verdier 79'	Stadium: Parc des Sports; Attendance: 1,900; Referee: (France) Yann Flament

5 January 2024 Round of 64	FC Challans	0–4	Rodez	Challans
18:00		Report	Corredor 3' 13' 63'; Abdallah (yellow card) 28'; Hountondji 55'; Ngouyamsa (yellow card) 65'	Stadium: Stade Jean Léveillé; Attendance: 1,924; Referee: (France) Ruddy Buquet

20 January 2024 Round of 32	Rodez	1–3	Monaco	Rodez
17:30	Mambo 21'	Report	Ben Yedder 10' (pen.) (yellow card) 11' (goal) 50' 58'; Kehrer (yellow card) 28'; Ouattara (yellow card) 69'	Stadium: Stade Paul-Lignon; Attendance: 3,236; Referee: (France) Jérémy Stinat
