= List of French football transfers summer 2023 =

This is a list of French football transfers for the 2023–24 summer transfer window. Only transfers featuring Ligue 1 and Ligue 2 are listed.

== Transfers ==
Date	Name	Moving from	Moving to	Fee
2 May 2023	(France) Andy Diouf	Rennes	(Switzerland) Basel	€5.5m
1 June 2023	(France) Niels Nkounkou	(England) Everton	Saint-Étienne	Undisclosed
7 June 2023	(France) Sikou Niakaté	EA Guingamp	(Portugal) Braga	€1.8m
9 June 2023	(Turkey) Cenk Özkacar	Lyon	(Spain) Valencia	€5m
11 June 2023	(Algeria) Houssem Aouar	Lyon	(Italy) Roma	Free
15 June 2023	(Germany) Julian Pollersbeck	Lyon	(Germany) 1. FC Magdeburg	Free
20 June 2023	(Romania) Rareș Ilie	Nice	(Switzerland) Lausanne-Sport	Loan
21 June 2023	(Guadeloupe) Rémy Labeau	Lens	Laval	Loan
21 June 2023	(Poland) Arkadiusz Milik	Marseille	(Italy) Juventus	€6.3m
21 June 2023	(Democratic Republic of the Congo) Peter Ouaneh	Châteauroux	Laval	Free
21 June 2023	(Mali) Mamadou Samassa	(Malaysia) Sri Pahang	Laval	Free
23 June 2023	(Netherlands) Stijn Spierings	Toulouse	Lens	Free
29 June 2023	(France) Neil El Aynaoui	Nancy	Lens	Undisclosed
29 June 2023	(Guinea) Morgan Guilavogui	Paris	Lens	Undisclosed
30 June 2023	(France) Andy Diouf	(Switzerland) Basel	Lens	Undisclosed
1 July 2023	(Ivory Coast) Kouadio Ange Ahoussou	Nice	Sochaux	Loan
1 July 2023	(Jordan) Musa Al-Taamari	(Belgium) OH Leuven	Montpellier	Free
1 July 2023	(Central African Republic) Vénuste Baboula	Racing Club de France	Quevilly-Rouen	Free
1 July 2023	(France) Loïc Badé	Rennes	(Spain) Sevilla	€12m
1 July 2023	(Senegal) Yacouba Barry	Lens	Annecy	Undisclosed
1 July 2023	(France) Steven Baseya	Nancy	Strasbourg	Undisclosed
1 July 2023	(France) Maxime Bernauer	Paris	(Croatia) Dinamo Zagreb	Undisclosed
1 July 2023	(France) Florian Bianchini	Amiens	Bastia	Free
1 July 2023	(France) Théo Borne	Angers	Clermont Foot	Free
1 July 2023	(Comoros) Ismaël Boura	Lens	Troyes	Free
1 July 2023	(France) Bilal Boutobba	Niort	Clermont Foot	Free
1 July 2023	(France) Ludovic Butelle	Red Star	Reims	Undisclosed
1 July 2023	(France) Noah Cadiou	Red Star	Quevilly-Rouen	Free
1 July 2023	(France) Adama Camara	Racing Club de France	Paris	Free
1 July 2023	(Tunisia) Amin Cherni	Chambly	Laval	Free
1 July 2023	(France) Ibrahim Cissoko	(Netherlands) NEC	Toulouse	Free
1 July 2023	(Guinea) Facinet Conte	Unattached	Bastia	Free
1 July 2023	(France) Sébastien Corchia	Nantes	Amiens	Free
1 July 2023	(France) Enzo Crombez	Amiens	Rodez	Free
1 July 2023	(Algeria) Andy Delort	Nice	Nantes	Undisclosed
1 July 2023	(France) Mahamadou Diawara	Paris Saint-Germain	Lyon	Free
1 July 2023	(France) Junior Dina Ebimbe	Paris Saint-Germain	(Germany) Eintracht Frankfurt	Undisclosed
1 July 2023	(France) Marvin Elimbi	Strasbourg	(Portugal) Torreense	Undisclosed
1 July 2023	(France) Romaric Etondé	Paris Saint-Germain	Monaco	Free
1 July 2023	(France) Jules Gaudin	EA Guingamp	Paris	Free
1 July 2023	(Guinea) Serhou Guirassy	Rennes	(Germany) VfB Stuttgart	€9m
1 July 2023	(England) Rhys Healey	Toulouse	(England) Watford	Free
1 July 2023	(Uruguay) Jonathan Iglesias	Paris	EA Guingamp	Free
1 July 2023	(France) George Ilenikhena	Amiens	(Belgium) Royal Antwerp	Undisclosed
1 July 2023	(Nigeria) Taofeek Ismaheel	Lorient	(Belgium) Beveren	Loan
1 July 2023	(Haiti) Dany Jean	Strasbourg	US Avranches	Loan
1 July 2023	(Germany) Moritz Jenz	Lorient	(Germany) VfL Wolfsburg	Undisclosed
1 July 2023	(France) Junior Kadile	Rennes	Laval	Undisclosed
1 July 2023	(France) Kylian Kaïboué	Bastia	Amiens	Undisclosed
1 July 2023	(Central African Republic) Geoffrey Kondogbia	(Spain) Atlético Madrid	Marseille	Undisclosed
1 July 2023	(France) Antoine Larose	Louhans-Cuiseaux	Annecy	Undisclosed
1 July 2023	(France) Jordan Lefort	Paris	Angers	Undisclosed
1 July 2023	(France) Victor Lekhal	Le Havre	(Qatar) Umm Salal	Free
1 July 2023	(France) Benjamin Leroy	Ajaccio	Quevilly-Rouen	Free
1 July 2023	(France) Matéo Loubatières	Montpellier	Bastia	Undisclosed
1 July 2023	(Democratic Republic of the Congo) Isaac Matondo	Les Herbiers	Concarneau	Undisclosed
1 July 2023	(Egypt) Mostafa Mohamed	(Turkey) Galatasaray	Nantes	Undisclosed
1 July 2023	(France) Mathieu Michel	Niort	Ajaccio	Free
1 July 2023	(Hungary) Loïc Négo	(Hungary) Fehérvár	Le Havre	Undisclosed
1 July 2023	(Cameroon) Ahmad Ngouyamsa	Dijon	Rodez	Free
1 July 2023	(Switzerland) Bećir Omeragić	(Switzerland) Zürich	Montpellier	Free
1 July 2023	(Guadeloupe) Matthias Phaëton	Grenoble	(Bulgaria) CSKA Sofia	Undisclosed
1 July 2023	(France) Tom Rapnouil	Toulouse	(Bulgaria) CSKA 1948 Sofia	Undisclosed
1 July 2023	(Belgium) Dante Rigo	(Belgium) Beerschot	Grenoble	Free
1 July 2023	(Benin) Yohan Roche	(Turkey) Adanaspor	Quevilly-Rouen	Free
1 July 2023	(Rwanda) Hakim Sahabo	Lille	(Belgium) Standard Liège	Undisclosed
1 July 2023	(France) Amine Salama	Angers	Reims	Undisclosed
1 July 2023	(France) Sam Sanna	Toulouse	Laval	Undisclosed
1 July 2023	(France) Jordan Semedo	Monaco	(Belgium) Cercle Brugge	Loan
1 July 2023	(Mali) Hamari Traoré	Rennes	(Spain) Real Sociedad	Free
1 July 2023	(Netherlands) Branco van den Boomen	Toulouse	(Netherlands) Ajax	Free
1 July 2023	(United States) Timothy Weah	Lille	(Italy) Juventus	Undisclosed
1 July 2023	(France) Matthéo Xantippe	Amiens	Grenoble	Undisclosed
1 July 2023	(France) Arthur Zagré	Monaco	(Netherlands) Excelsior	Undisclosed
2 July 2023	(France) Yvann Maçon	Saint-Étienne	(Israel) Maccabi Tel Aviv	Loan
3 July 2023	(France) Amine Boutrah	Concarneau	(Netherlands) Vitesse	Undisclosed
3 July 2023	(France) Cheick Doumbia	Lorient	Le Havre	Undisclosed
3 July 2023	(France) Nicolas Lemaître	Quevilly-Rouen	Troyes	Free
3 July 2023	(France) Cédric Makutungu	Saint-Priest	Dijon	Undisclosed
3 July 2023	(France) Rayan Souici	Avranches	Dijon	Undisclosed
3 July 2023	(Colombia) Luis Suárez	Marseille	(Spain) Almería	Undisclosed
4 July 2023	(France) Skelly Alvero	Sochaux	Lyon	€4m
4 July 2023	(France) Yoël Armougom	Sochaux	Clermont Foot	Undisclosed
4 July 2023	(Morocco) Yacine Bammou	(Qatar) Al-Shamal	Ajaccio	Undisclosed
4 July 2023	(France) Rudy Boulais	Quevilly-Rouen	Concarneau	Undisclosed
4 July 2023	(France) Yohan Cassubie	Niort	Bordeaux	Undisclosed
4 July 2023	(Senegal) Elhadji Pape Diaw	(Ukraine) Rukh Lviv	Laval	Loan
4 July 2023	(Guinea) Kandet Diawara	(Cyprus) APOEL	Le Havre	Undisclosed
4 July 2023	(France) Florent Duparchy	Reims	EA Guingamp	Undisclosed
4 July 2023	(Ivory Coast) Cyriaque Irié	(Burkina Faso) Real du Faso	Dijon	Undisclosed
4 July 2023	(Mali) Habib Keïta	Lyon	Clermont Foot	€1.2m
4 July 2023	(France) Dimitri Liénard	Strasbourg	Bastia	Free
4 July 2023	(Senegal) Pierre Sagna	(Portugal) Santa Clara	Dijon	Undisclosed
4 July 2023	(French Guiana) Yoann Salmier	Troyes	Le Havre	Undisclosed
4 July 2023	(Senegal) Issa Soumaré	(Belgium) Beerschot	Le Havre	Undisclosed
4 July 2023	(France) Yaya Soumaré	Lyon	Orléans	Free
4 July 2023	(France) Eddy Sylvestre	Pau	Grenoble	Undisclosed
4 July 2023	(France) Waniss Taïbi	Angers	Rodez	Undisclosed
4 July 2023	(France) Malik Tchokounté	Nîmes	Laval	Free
4 July 2023	(Canada) Iké Ugbo	Troyes	(Wales) Cardiff City	Loan
4 July 2023	(France) Gaëtan Weissbeck	Sochaux	Bordeaux	Loan
5 July 2023	(Turkey) Doğan Alemdar	Rennes	Troyes	Loan
5 July 2023	(France) Ludovic Blas	Nantes	Rennes	€15m
5 July 2023	(Belgium) Maximiliano Caufriez	(Russia) Spartak Moscow	Clermont Foot	Undisclosed
5 July 2023	(Mali) Senou Coulibaly	Dijon	(Cyprus) Ominia	Undisclosed
5 July 2023	(France) Simon Elisor	(Belgium) RFC Seraing	Metz	Undisclosed
5 July 2023	(France) Gauthier Gallon	Troyes	Rennes	Undisclosed
5 July 2023	(Senegal) Lamine Gueye	Metz	Paris	Undisclosed
5 July 2023	(Scotland) Fraser Hornby	Reims	(Germany) Darmstadt 98	Undisclosed
5 July 2023	(France) Valentin Jacob	Dijon	Ajaccio	Undisclosed
5 July 2023	(Portugal) Tiago Santos	(Portugal) Estoril	Lille	€6.5m
5 July 2023	(Peru) Renato Tapia	(Spain) Celta Vigo	Lyon	€5m
5 July 2023	(Slovenia) Žan Vipotnik	(Slovenia) Maribor	Bordeaux	Undisclosed
5 July 2023	(Comoros) Benjaloud Youssouf	Châteauroux	Dunkerque	Free
6 July 2023	(Morocco) Saad Agouzoul	Sochaux	Auxerre	Undisclosed
6 July 2023	(Spain) Marco Asensio	(Spain) Real Madrid	Paris Saint-Germain	Free
6 July 2023	(France) Hugo Barbet	EA Guingamp	Nantes	Free
6 July 2023	(France) Kayne Bonnevie	Lyon	Quevilly-Rouen	Free
6 July 2023	(France) Ayman Kari	Paris Saint-Germain	Lorient	Loan
6 July 2023	(Bosnia and Herzegovina) Sead Kolašinac	Marseille	(Italy) Atalanta	Free
6 July 2023	(Angola) Clinton Mata	(Belgium) Club Brugge	Lyon	€5m
6 July 2023	(France) Tristan Muyumba	EA Guingamp	(United States) Atlanta United	Undisclosed
6 July 2023	(Senegal) Amadou Sagna	Niort	EA Guingamp	Undisclosed
6 July 2023	(France) Ibrahim Sissoko	Sochaux	Saint-Étienne	Undisclosed
6 July 2023	(Slovakia) Milan Škriniar	(Italy) Inter Milan	Paris Saint-Germain	Free
7 July 2023	(France) Nathan Buayi-Kiala	(Italy) Parma	Auxerre	Loan
7 July 2023	(Bosnia and Herzegovina) Belmin Dizdarević	(Bosnia and Herzegovina) Sarajevo	Montpellier	Undisclosed
7 July 2023	(Denmark) Kasper Dolberg	Nice	(Belgium) Anderlecht	€5m
7 July 2023	(Venezuela) Cristian Cásseres Jr.	(United States) New York Red Bulls	Toulouse	€1m
7 July 2023	(France) Enzo Le Fée	Lorient	Rennes	Undisclosed
7 July 2023	(France) Samuel Loric	Lorient	Quevilly-Rouen	Undisclosed
7 July 2023	(Brazil) Thiago Mendes	Lyon	(Qatar) Al-Rayyan	€4.211m
7 July 2023	(France) Robin Risser	Strasbourg	Dijon	Loan
7 July 2023	(Burkina Faso) Abdoul Tapsoba	(Belgium) Standard Liège	Amiens	Loan
7 July 2023	(Malta) Teddy Teuma	(Belgium) Union SG	Reims	€3.6m
7 July 2023	(Uruguay) Manuel Ugarte	(Portugal) Sporting CP	Paris Saint-Germain	€60m
8 July 2023	(South Korea) Lee Kang-in	(Spain) Mallorca	Paris Saint-Germain	€22m
8 July 2023	(Comoros) Iyad Mohamed	SM Caen	Pau	Undisclosed
8 July 2023	(Sweden) Anton Salétros	SM Caen	(Sweden) AIK	€800k
9 July 2023	(France) Lucas Hernandez	(Germany) Bayern Munich	Paris Saint-Germain	€47m
10 July 2023	(Madagascar) Kenji-Van Boto	Auxerre	Pau	Undisclosed
10 July 2023	(Algeria) Andy Delort	Nantes	(Qatar) Umm Salal	€2.5m
10 July 2023	(France) Giovanni Haag	Nancy	Rodez	Undisclosed
10 July 2023	(Algeria) Ilan Kebbal	Reims	Paris	Undisclosed
11 July 2023	(France) Soulyemane Cissé	Clermont Foot	Dijon	Undisclosed
11 July 2023	(France) Armand Gnanduillet	Le Mans	Dunkerque	Free
11 July 2023	(France) Elies Mahmoud	Le Havre	(Switzerland) Stade Lausanne Ouchy	Undisclosed
11 July 2023	(France) Kader N'Choni	Laval	Dijon	Undisclosed
11 July 2023	(France) Johann Obiang	SM Caen	Pau	Undisclosed
12 July 2023	(France) Logan Delaurier-Chaubet	Bordeaux	Quevilly-Rouen	Loan
12 July 2023	(France) Franck Honorat	Brest	(Germany) Borussia Mönchengladbach	€9m
12 July 2023	(France) Oussmane Kebe	Metz	(Belgium) RFC Seraing	Loan
12 July 2023	(Russia) Daler Kuzyayev	(Russia) Zenit	Le Havre	Undisclosed
12 July 2023	(Central African Republic) Louis Mafouta	Quevilly-Rouen	Amiens	Undisclosed
12 July 2023	(Italy) Cher Ndour	(Portugal) Benfica	Paris Saint-Germain	Free
12 July 2023	(France) Andy Pelmard	(Switzerland) Basel	Clermont Foot	Undisclosed
12 July 2023	(France) Lilian Raillot	Metz	(Belgium) RFC Seraing	Loan
12 July 2023	(Guinea-Bissau) Opa Sanganté	Châteauroux	Dunkerque	Undisclosed
12 July 2023	(France) Édouard Soumah-Abbad	Metz	(Belgium) RFC Seraing	Loan
12 July 2023	(France) Yanis Verdier	Châteauroux	Rodez	Undisclosed
12 July 2023	(Italy) Mattia Viti	Nice	(Italy) Sassuolo	Loan
13 July 2023	(France) Romain Faivre	Lyon	(England) Bournemouth	€15m
13 July 2023	(France) Romain Faivre	(England) Bournemouth	Lorient	Loan
13 July 2023	(France) Jean Marcelin	Monaco	Bordeaux	Undisclosed
13 July 2023	(France) Natanael Ntolla	Châteauroux	Grenoble	Undisclosed
13 July 2023	(France) Arnold Temanfo	Annecy	Dijon	Undisclosed
14 July 2023	(Colombia) Óscar Cortés	(Colombia) Millonarios	Lens	Undisclosed
14 July 2023	(Gabon) Alan Do Marcolino	Rennes	Quevilly-Rouen	Loan
14 July 2023	(Brazil) Renan Lodi	(Spain) Atlético Madrid	Marseille	€13m
14 July 2023	(Belgium) Loïs Openda	Lens	(Germany) RB Leipzig	Undisclosed
14 July 2023	(Panama) Ángel Orelien	(Panama) Sporting San Miguelito	Dunkerque	Undisclosed
14 July 2023	(Uruguay) Martín Satriano	(Italy) Inter Milan	Brest	Loan
15 July 2023	(France) Iron Gomis	Amiens	(Turkey) Kasımpaşa	Undisclosed
15 July 2023	(Switzerland) Philipp Köhn	(Austria) Red Bull Salzburg	Monaco	Undisclosed
15 July 2023	(Argentina) Lionel Messi	Paris Saint-Germain	(United States) Inter Miami	Free
15 July 2023	(Wales) Aaron Ramsey	Nice	(Wales) Cardiff City	Free
15 July 2023	(Ivory Coast) Abakar Sylla	(Belgium) Club Brugge	Strasbourg	Undisclosed
16 July 2023	(Brazil) Jean Lucas	Monaco	(Brazil) Santos	Undisclosed
17 July 2023	(Iceland) Hákon Arnar Haraldsson	(Denmark) Copenhagen	Lille	€12m
17 July 2023	(France) Yasser Larouci	Troyes	(England) Sheffield United	Loan
17 July 2023	(France) Sullivan Péan	SM Caen	Villefranche	Undisclosed
17 July 2023	(France) Esteban Salles	Grenoble	Concarneau	Undisclosed
17 July 2023	(Guinea) Dembo Sylla	Laval	Lorient	Undisclosed
18 July 2023	(France) El Chadaille Bitshiabu	Paris Saint-Germain	(Germany) RB Leipzig	Undisclosed
18 July 2023	(France) Rémy Boissier	Rodez	Dunkerque	Undisclosed
18 July 2023	(Poland) Adam Buksa	Lens	(Turkey) Antalyaspor	Loan
18 July 2023	(France) Maxime Dupé	Toulouse	(Belgium) Anderlecht	Free
18 July 2023	(Ivory Coast) Seko Fofana	Lens	(Saudi Arabia) Al Nassr	Undisclosed
18 July 2023	(Portugal) José Fonte	Lille	(Portugal) Braga	Free
18 July 2023	(Bosnia and Herzegovina) Said Hamulić	Toulouse	(Netherlands) Vitesse	Loan
18 July 2023	(Central African Republic) Geoffrey Lembet	Sedan	Rennes	Undisclosed
18 July 2023	(France) Lamine Sy	SM Caen	Rouen	Loan
18 July 2023	(France) Lenny Vallier	Niort	EA Guingamp	Undisclosed
18 July 2023	(France) Thibaut Vargas	Nîmes	Laval	Free
19 July 2023	(France) Rocco Ascone	Lille	(Denmark) Nordsjælland	Undisclosed
19 July 2023	(Ivory Coast) Jonathan Bamba	Lille	(Spain) Celta Vigo	Undisclosed
19 July 2023	(Guinea) Yadaly Diaby	Clermont Foot	Austria Lustenau	Loan
19 July 2023	(Senegal) Baïla Diallo	Clermont Foot	Austria Lustenau	Loan
19 July 2023	(Greece) Anastasios Donis	Reims	(Greece) APOEL	Undisclosed
19 July 2023	(France) Lucas Lavallée	Paris Saint-Germain	Dunkerque	Loan
19 July 2023	(Senegal) Joseph Lopy	Nîmes	Angers	Undisclosed
19 July 2023	(France) Jonas Martin	Lille	Brest	Free
19 July 2023	(France) Benjamin Mendy	(England) Manchester City	Lorient	Free
19 July 2023	(Senegal) Formose Mendy	Amiens	Lorient	Undisclosed
19 July 2023	(Netherlands) Xavi Simons	(Netherlands) PSV	Paris Saint-Germain	€6m
19 July 2023	(Netherlands) Xavi Simons	Paris Saint-Germain	(Germany) RB Leipzig	Loan
19 July 2023	(France) Hamjatou Soukouna	Sedan	Annecy	Undisclosed
20 July 2023	(France) Nicolas de Préville	(Germany) 1. FC Kaiserslautern	Troyes	Free
20 July 2023	(Turkey) Bartuğ Elmaz	Marseille	(Turkey) Fenerbahçe	Undisclosed
20 July 2023	(France) Samuel Essende	SM Caen	(Portugal) Vizela	Loan
20 July 2023	(Iceland) Haukur Andri Haraldsson	(Iceland) ÍA	Lille	Undisclosed
20 July 2023	(Benin) Andréas Hountondji	SM Caen	Rodez	Loan
20 July 2023	(France) Lenny Joseph	Metz	Grenoble	Undisclosed
20 July 2023	(France) Sekou Lega	Lyon	Bastia	Loan
20 July 2023	(Senegal) Moustapha Mbow	Reims	Paris	Undisclosed
20 July 2023	(Senegal) Abdoulaye Ndiaye	Lyon	Troyes	Undisclosed
20 July 2023	(France) Alexis Sauvage	Laval	Amiens	Free
20 July 2023	(Central African Republic) Dominique Youfeigane	EA Guingamp	Lorient	Undisclosed
21 July 2023	(Ivory Coast) Kouadio Ange Ahoussou	Nice	Pau	Undisclosed
21 July 2023	(Gabon) Pierre-Emerick Aubameyang	(England) Chelsea	Marseille	Undisclosed
21 July 2023	(France) Mathias Autret	Auxerre	SM Caen	Free
21 July 2023	(Senegal) Ousmane Ba	Metz	Cholet	Loan
21 July 2023	(Algeria) Noa Cervantes	Reims	Troyes	Undisclosed
21 July 2023	(France) Zakaria Fdaouch	Martigues	Dijon	Undisclosed
21 July 2023	(Germany) Reda Khadra	(England) Brighton & Hove Albion	Reims	Undisclosed
21 July 2023	(France) Frank Magri	Bastia	Toulouse	Undisclosed
21 July 2023	(Ivory Coast) Jean N'Guessan	Nice	Metz	Undisclosed
21 July 2023	(Mauritania) Babacar Niasse	(Portugal) Tondela	EA Guingamp	Undisclosed
21 July 2023	(Cameroon) Jean Onana	Lens	(Turkey) Beşiktaş	Undisclosed
21 July 2023	(France) Stephen Quemper	EA Guingamp	Ajaccio	Undisclosed
21 July 2023	(France) Samuel Umtiti	(Spain) Barcelona	Lille	Free
22 July 2023	(Kenya) Joseph Okumu	(Belgium) Gent	Reims	Undisclosed
22 July 2023	(Moldova) Virgiliu Postolachi	(Romania) UTA Arad	Grenoble	Undisclosed
22 July 2023	(Comoros) Rafiki Saïd	Nîmes	Troyes	Undisclosed
22 July 2023	(Senegal) Ibou Sané	(Senegal) Génération Foot	Metz	Undisclosed
22 July 2023	(Senegal) Sadibou Sané	(Senegal) Génération Foot	Metz	Undisclosed
22 July 2023	(England) Josh Wilson-Esbrand	(England) Manchester City	Reims	Loan
23 July 2023	(England) Taylor Moore	(England) Bristol CIty	Valenciennes	Free
24 July 2023	(Guadeloupe) Andreaw Gravillon	Reims	(Turkey) Adana Demirspor	Undisclosed
24 July 2023	(Uzbekistan) Abdukodir Khusanov	(Belarus) Energetik-BSU	Lens	Undisclosed
24 July 2023	(Senegal) Pape Ousmane Sakho	(Tanzania) Simba	Quevilly-Rouen	Undisclosed
24 July 2023	(France) Morgan Sanson	(England) Aston Villa	Nice	Loan
24 July 2023	(Senegal) Ismaïla Sarr	(England) Watford	Marseille	Undisclosed
24 July 2023	(Netherlands) Osaze Urhoghide	(Scotland) Celtic	Amiens	Undisclosed
25 July 2023	(Benin) Tosin Aiyegun	(Switzerland) Zürich	Lorient	€4m
25 July 2023	(Tunisia) Mohamed Ben Fredj	Auxerre	Dijon	Undisclosed
25 July 2023	(Ivory Coast) Jérémie Boga	(Italy) Atalanta	Nice	Undisclosed
25 July 2023	(France) Alexandre Coeff	(Italy) Brescia	SM Caen	Free
25 July 2023	(Senegal) Mouhamed Diop	(Turkey) Kocaelispor	Troyes	Undisclosed
25 July 2023	(Netherlands) Eros Maddy	(Netherlands) Helmond Sport	Auxerre	Undisclosed
25 July 2023	(France) Moïse Mahop	Créteil	Annecy	Undisclosed
26 July 2023	(Spain) Álex Domínguez	(Spain) Las Palmas	Toulouse	Undisclosed
26 July 2023	(France) Julien Maggiotti	(Belgium) Charleroi	Bastia	Undisclosed
26 July 2023	(France) Ilyes Najim	SM Caen	Martigues	Loan
26 July 2023	(Netherlands) Calvin Stengs	Nice	(Netherlands) Feyenoord	€6m
26 July 2023	(France) Abdoulaye Touré	(Italy) Genoa	Le Havre	Undisclosed
27 July 2023	(Benin) Mattéo Ahlinvi	Dijon	(Serbia) Čukarički	Undisclosed
27 July 2023	(France) Maxime Colin	(England) Birmingham City	Metz	Undisclosed
27 July 2023	(France) Rafik Guitane	Reims	(Portugal) Estoril	Undisclosed
27 July 2023	(France) Jérémy Livolant	EA Guingamp	Bordeaux	€1.2m
27 July 2023	(France) Bradley Locko	Reims	Brest	€500k
27 July 2023	(Austria) Dario Marešić	Reims	(Croatia) Istra 1961	Undisclosed
27 July 2023	(Senegal) Ousseynou Thioune	Dijon	(Cyprus) Anorthosis Famagusta	Undisclosed
27 July 2023	(Mauritania) Pape Ndiaga Yade	Metz	Quevilly-Rouen	Loan
27 July 2023	(Senegal) Abdallah Ndour	Sochaux	EA Guingamp	Undisclosed
27 July 2023	(France) Gaëtan Poussin	Bordeaux	(Spain) Zaragoza	Undisclosed
27 July 2023	(Brazil) Rafael Ratão	Toulouse	(Brazil) Bahia	Undisclosed
27 July 2023	(Morocco) Abdelwahed Wahib	Le Havre	Concarneau	Undisclosed
28 July 2023	(Morocco) Othmane Chraibi	Metz	Châteauroux	Loan
28 July 2023	(Mali) Fred Gnalega	Clermont Foot	FC Chamalières	Loan
28 July 2023	(Argentina) Mauro Icardi	Paris Saint-Germain	(Turkey) Galatasaray	Undisclosed
28 July 2023	(Sweden) Zeidane Inoussa	SM Caen	(Sweden) Brommapojkarna	Undisclosed
28 July 2023	(France) Jean Louchet	Niort	Valenciennes	Free
28 July 2023	(France) Baptiste Mouazan	Nancy	Concarneau	Undisclosed
28 July 2023	(Turkey) Cem Türkmen	Clermont Foot	(Turkey) MKE Ankaragücü	Undisclosed
30 July 2023	(Spain) Rubén Blanco	(Spain) Celta Vigo	Marseille	€2m
30 July 2023	(France) Florent Da Silva	Lyon	(Belgium) RWD Molenbeek	Loan
30 July 2023	(Croatia) Marin Jakoliš	Angers	(Australia) Melbourne City	Loan
30 July 2023	(Spain) Arnau Tenas	(Spain) Barcelona	Paris Saint-Germain	Free
31 July 2023	(France) Florian Ayé	(Italy) Brescia	Auxerre	Undisclosed
31 July 2023	(Tunisia) Ayman Ben Mohamed	Le Havre	EA Guingamp	Free
31 July 2023	(Senegal) Lamine Diack	(Turkey) Ankaragücü	Nantes	Loan
31 July 2023	(France) Ouparine Djoco	Clermont Foot	(Belgium) Francs Borains	Loan
31 July 2023	(Romania) Alex Dobre	Dijon	(Portugal) Famalicão	€600k
31 July 2023	(France) Florent Hanin	Paris	Angers	Free
31 July 2023	(France) Geoffrey Kondo	Dunkerque	Furiani-Agliani	Loan
31 July 2023	(England) Stephy Mavididi	Montpellier	(England) Leicester City	€7.5m
1 August 2023	(Senegal) Baye Ablaye Mbaye	(Senegal) CNEPS Excellence	Bastia	Loan
1 August 2023	(France) Teddy Bartouche	Lorient	EA Guingamp	Undisclosed
1 August 2023	(France) Paul Bernardoni	Angers	(Turkey) Konyaspor	Undisclosed
1 August 2023	(Senegal) Iliman Ndiaye	(England) Sheffield United	Marseille	€20m
1 August 2023	(France) Ronaël Pierre-Gabriel	(Germany) Mainz 05	Nantes	Undisclosed
1 August 2023	(Ghana) Mohammed Salisu	(England) Southampton	Monaco	Undisclosed
1 August 2023	(France) Isaac Tshipamba	Quevilly-Rouen	Avranches	Loan
1 August 2023	(France) Lesley Ugochukwu	Rennes	(England) Chelsea	Undisclosed
2 August 2023	(Croatia) Duje Ćaleta-Car	(England) Southampton	Lyon	Loan
2 August 2023	(Morocco) Nassim Chadli	Le Havre	Concarneau	Loan
2 August 2023	(France) Julien Faussurier	Sochaux	Concarneau	Undisclosed
2 August 2023	(France) Loup-Diwan Gueho	Paris	Bastia	Undisclosed
2 August 2023	(Ivory Coast) Moussa Guel	(Turkey) Samsunspor	Dunkerque	Loan
2 August 2023	(France) Raphaël Lipinski	Auxerre	Rodez	Undisclosed
2 August 2023	(France) Daylam Meddah	Sochaux	SM Caen	Undisclosed
2 August 2023	(United States) Erik Palmer-Brown	Troyes	(Greece) Panathinaikos	Undisclosed
2 August 2023	(Ecuador) Jackson Porozo	Troyes	(Greece) Olympiacos	Loan
2 August 2023	(Germany) Niklas Schmidt	(Germany) Werder Bremen	Toulouse	€2.5m
2 August 2023	(Netherlands) Kaj Sierhuis	Reims	(Netherlands) Fortuna Sittard	Undisclosed
2 August 2023	(Portugal) Xande Silva	Dijon	(United States) Atlanta United	Loan
2 August 2023	(Senegal) Sambou Soumano	Lorient	Quevilly-Rouen	Loan
2 August 2023	(Finland) Jere Uronen	Brest	(United States) Charlotte FC	Undisclosed
3 August 2023	(France) Julien Benhaim	Stade Briochin	Ajaccio	Free
3 August 2023	(Spain) Pedro Díaz	(Spain) Sporting Gijón	Bordeaux	Undisclosed
3 August 2023	(France) Lohann Doucet	Nantes	Paris	Loan
3 August 2023	(Netherlands) Anthony Musaba	Monaco	(England) Sheffield Wednesday	Undisclosed
3 August 2023	(Senegal) Massamba Ndiaye	Pau	Clermont Foot	Undisclosed
3 August 2023	(Australia) Mohamed Toure	Reims	Paris	Loan
4 August 2023	(Senegal) Idrissa Camara	Dijon	(Turkey) Boluspor	Undisclosed
4 August 2023	(France) Axel Disasi	Monaco	(England) Chelsea	€45m
4 August 2023	(France) Adrien Lebeau	(Germany) Waldhof Mannheim	Brest	Undisclosed
4 August 2023	(France) Brayann Pereira	Auxerre	(Netherlands) NEC	Loan
5 August 2023	(Senegal) Dion Lopy	Reims	(Spain) Almería	Undisclosed
5 August 2023	(France) Alexandre Phliponeau	Annecy	Concarneau	Undisclosed
6 August 2023	(The Gambia) Adama Bojang	(The Gambia) Steve Biko	Reims	Undisclosed
6 August 2023	(Brazil) Andrei Girotto	Nantes	(Saudi Arabia) Al Taawoun	Undisclosed
7 August 2023	(Nigeria) Akor Adams	(Norway) Lillestrøm	Montpellier	Undisclosed
7 August 2023	(England) Ainsley Maitland-Niles	(England) Arsenal	Lyon	Free
7 August 2023	(Gabon) Didier Ndong	Dijon	(Saudi Arabia) Al-Riyadh	Undisclosed
7 August 2023	(Portugal) Gonçalo Ramos	(Portugal) Benfica	Paris Saint-Germain	Loan
8 August 2023	(France) Bobby Allain	(Greece) Ionikos	Grenoble	Undisclosed
8 August 2023	(Guinea) Elhadj Bah	(Turkey) Samsunspor	Dunkerque	Loan
8 August 2023	(France) Dilane Bakwa	Bordeaux	Strasbourg	Undisclosed
8 August 2023	(United States) Konrad de la Fuente	Marseille	(Spain) Eibar	Loan
8 August 2023	(Brazil) Ângelo Gabriel	(England) Chelsea	Strasbourg	Loan
8 August 2023	(France) Tom Lacoux	Bordeaux	(Portugal) Famalicão	Loan
8 August 2023	(France) Junior Mwanga	Bordeaux	Strasbourg	Undisclosed
8 August 2023	(Cameroon) Aboubakar Siddick	(Cameroon) Coton Sport	Auxerre	Undisclosed
8 August 2023	(France) Moussa Sylla	SM Caen	Pau	Loan
8 August 2023	(France) Thomas Vannoye	Dunkerque	Loon-Plage	Undisclosed
9 August 2023	(Brazil) Camilo	Lyon	(Russia) Akhmat Grozny	Undisclosed
9 August 2023	(Morocco) Nordine Kandil	Strasbourg	Annecy	Undisclosed
9 August 2023	(France) Bryan Pelé	(Cyprus) AEL Limassol	Concarneau	Free
9 August 2023	(Guinea) Saïdou Sow	Saint-Étienne	Strasbourg	Undisclosed
10 August 2023	(France) Martin Adeline	Reims	Annecy	Loan
10 August 2023	(Sweden) Jens Cajuste	Reims	(Italy) Napoli	Undisclosed
10 August 2023	(Portugal) Ivan Cavaleiro	(England) Fulham	Lille	Undisclosed
10 August 2023	(Senegal) Assane Dioussé	(Greece) OFI Crete	Auxerre	Undisclosed
10 August 2023	(Martinique) Kévin Farade	Annecy	Nancy	Loan
10 August 2023	(Argentina) Ignacio Miramón	(Argentina) Gimnasia y Esgrima (LP)	Lille	Undisclosed
10 August 2023	(Japan) Keito Nakamura	(Austria) LASK	Reims	Undisclosed
10 August 2023	(United States) Emmanuel Sabbi	(Denmark) OB	Le Havre	Undisclosed
10 August 2023	(Ghana) Benjamin Tetteh	(England) Hull City	Metz	Undisclosed
11 August 2023	(Denmark) Mohamed Daramy	(Netherlands) Ajax	Reims	Undisclosed
11 August 2023	(Cape Verde) Steven Fortès	Lens	Quevilly-Rouen	Free
11 August 2023	(France) Castello Lukeba	Lyon	(Germany) RB Leipzig	€34m
12 August 2023	(Brazil) Douglas Augusto	(Greece) PAOK	Nantes	Undisclosed
12 August 2023	(France) Ousmane Dembélé	(Spain) Barcelona	Paris Saint-Germain	€50.4m
12 August 2023	(France) Alexis Flips	Reims	(Belgium) Anderlecht	Undisclosed
12 August 2023	(Brazil) Marquinhos	(England) Arsenal	Nantes	Loan
12 August 2023	(France) Wilson Odobert	Troyes	(England) Burnley	Undisclosed
13 August 2023	(Turkey) Cengiz Ünder	Marseille	(Turkey) Fenerbahçe	€15m
14 August 2023	(Serbia) Nemanja Matić	(Italy) Roma	Rennes	€3m
14 August 2023	(Norway) Birger Meling	Rennes	(Denmark) Copenhagen	Undisclosed
14 August 2023	(Switzerland) Denis Zakaria	(Italy) Juventus	Monaco	Undisclosed
15 August 2023	(Senegal) Abdou Diallo	Paris Saint-Germain	(Qatar) Al-Arabi	€15m
15 August 2023	(France) Djeidi Gassama	Paris Saint-Germain	(England) Sheffield Wednesday	Undisclosed
15 August 2023	(Brazil) Neymar	Paris Saint-Germain	(Saudi Arabia) Al Hilal	€90m
15 August 2023	(Republic of Ireland) Jake O'Brien	(England) Crystal Palace	Lyon	Undisclosed
16 August 2023	(France) Warren Caddy	Paris	Annecy	Loan
16 August 2023	(Mali) Ibrahima Koné	Lorient	(Spain) Almería	Undisclosed
16 August 2023	(Croatia) Lovro Majer	Rennes	(Germany) VfL Wolfsburg	Undisclosed
16 August 2023	(Argentina) Leandro Paredes	Paris Saint-Germain	(Italy) Roma	€4m
16 August 2023	(Portugal) Renato Sanches	Paris Saint-Germain	(Italy) Roma	Loan
16 August 2023	(France) Titouan Thomas	(Portugal) Estoril	Laval	Undisclosed
17 August 2023	(Senegal) Habib Diallo	Strasbourg	(Saudi Arabia) Al Shabab	€20m
17 August 2023	(France) Louis Mouton	Saint-Étienne	Pau	Loan
17 August 2023	(Ivory Coast) Wilfried Singo	(Italy) Torino	Monaco	Undisclosed
17 August 2023	(Germany) Kevin Volland	Monaco	(Germany) Union Berlin	Undisclosed
19 August 2023	(Ukraine) Ruslan Malinovskyi	Marseille	(Italy) Genoa	Loan
20 August 2023	(France) Check Oumar Diakité	Paris	(Turkey) Adanaspor	Undisclosed
20 August 2023	(France) Elye Wahi	Montpellier	Lens	Undisclosed
21 August 2023	(France) Taïryk Arconte	Brest	Rodez	Loan
21 August 2023	(Cameroon) Aboubakar Nagida	Rennes	(Cameroon) EBBC	Undisclosed
21 August 2023	(France) Yoann Cathline	Lorient	(Netherlands) Almere City	Loan
21 August 2023	(Ivory Coast) Stéphane Diarra	Lorient	Saint-Étienne	Loan
21 August 2023	(Ivory Coast) N'dri Philippe Koffi	Reims	Sochaux	Undisclosed
21 August 2023	(Democratic Republic of the Congo) Stone Mambo	Orléans	Rodez	Undisclosed
21 August 2023	(France) Noha Ndombasi	(Switzerland) St. Gallen	Concarneau	Undisclosed
(France) Kalidou Sidibé	Quevilly-Rouen	EA Guingamp	Undisclosed	
22 August 2023	(Morocco) Sofiane Alakouch	Metz	Paris	Loan
22 August 2023	(Ivory Coast) Jonathan Kodjia	(Qatar) Umm Salal	Annecy	Free
22 August 2023	(France) Lenny Pirringuel	Bordeaux	Pau	Loan
23 August 2023	(France) Yanis Merdji	Niort	Concarneau	Undisclosed
24 August 2023	(Morocco) Mahmoud Bentayg	(Morocco) Raja CA	Saint-Étienne	Undisclosed
24 August 2023	(Belgium) Jérémy Doku	Rennes	(England) Manchester City	€65m
24 August 2023	(France) Noha Lemina	Paris Saint-Germain	(Italy) Sampdoria	Loan
24 August 2023	(Portugal) Pedro Mendes	Montpellier	(Portugal) Estrela	Free
24 August 2023	(Cameroon) Karl Toko Ekambi	Lyon	(Saudi Arabia) Abha	€1.5m
25 August 2023	(Switzerland) Gabriel Barès	Montpellier	Concarneau	Loan
25 August 2023	(Argentina) Joaquín Correa	(Italy) Inter Milan	Marseille	Loan
25 August 2023	(France) Kévin Schur	Bastia	Dijon	Free
28 August 2023	(Algeria) Nabil Bentaleb	Angers	Lille	Undisclosed
28 August 2023	(France) Hatim Far	Rodez	Toulon	Loan
28 August 2023	(Spain) Pol Lirola	Marseille	(Italy) Frosinone	Loan
28 August 2023	(Guinea-Bissau) Joseph Mendes	Rodez	Dijon	Undisclosed
28 August 2023	(Japan) Ado Onaiwu	Toulouse	Auxerre	Undisclosed
28 August 2023	(France) Rémi Oudin	Bordeaux	(Italy) Lecce	Undisclosed
28 August 2023	(France) Romain Perraud	(England) Southampton	Nice	Loan
29 August 2023	(Cameroon) Carlos Baleba	Lille	(England) Brighton & Hove Albion	€27m
29 August 2023	(France) Jason Berthomier	Valenciennes	(Australia) Newcastle Jets	Undisclosed
29 August 2023	(Luxembourg) Maxime Chanot	(United States) New York City	Ajaccio	Undisclosed
29 August 2023	(France) Amidou Doumbouya	Sochaux	Nice	Undisclosed
29 August 2023	(France) Naël Jaby	Clermont Foot	Cannes	Undisclosed
29 August 2023	(France) Billy Koumetio	(England) Liverpool	Dunkerque	Loan
29 August 2023	(Italy) Vito Mannone	Lorient	Lille	Undisclosed
29 August 2023	(France) Youssef Maziz	Metz	(Belgium) OH Leuven	Undisclosed
29 August 2023	(Senegal) Assane N'Doye	(Senegal) Amitié Academy	Dunkerque	Undisclosed
29 August 2023	(Poland) Mateusz Wieteska	Clermont Foot	(Italy) Cagliari	Undisclosed
29 August 2023	(Turkey) Bertuğ Yıldırım	(Turkey) Hatayspor	Rennes	Undisclosed
30 August 2023	(Algeria) Mehdi Baaloudj	EA Guingamp	Versailles	Undisclosed
30 August 2023	(Guinea-Bissau) Mama Baldé	Troyes	Lyon	Loan
30 August 2023	(United States) Folarin Balogun	(England) Arsenal	Monaco	€30m
30 August 2023	(Senegal) Mamadou Camara	Lens	Nancy	Loan
30 August 2023	(Algeria) Farès Chaïbi	Toulouse	(Germany) Eintracht Frankfurt	Undisclosed
30 August 2023	(England) Karamoko Dembélé	Brest	(England) Blackpool	Loan
30 August 2023	(Ivory Coast) Junior Diaz	Nantes	Annecy	Loan
30 August 2023	(France) Jean-Kévin Duverne	Brest	Nantes	Free
30 August 2023	(Mauritania) Pape Ibnou Ba	Le Havre	Concarneau	Loan
30 August 2023	(Georgia (country)) Georges Mikautadze	Metz	(Netherlands) Ajax	€16m
30 August 2023	(Panama) Michael Amir Murillo	(Belgium) Anderlecht	Marseille	Undisclosed
30 August 2023	(Algeria) Zakaria Naidji	Laval	(Algeria) MC Alger	Undisclosed
30 August 2023	(Ghana) Ernest Nuamah	(Belgium) RWD Molenbeek	Lyon	Loan
30 August 2023	(Poland) Łukasz Poręba	Lens	(Germany) Hamburger SV	Loan
30 August 2023	(France) Arthur Vitelli	EA Guingamp	Sochaux-Montbéliard	Undisclosed
31 August 2023	(France) Jordan Amavi	Marseille	Brest	Loan
31 August 2023	(France) Tiémoué Bakayoko	(England) Chelsea	Lorient	Free
31 August 2023	(France) Bradley Barcola	Lyon	Paris Saint-Germain	Undisclosed
31 August 2023	(Kosovo) Bersant Celina	Dijon	(Sweden) AIK	Loan
31 August 2023	(France) Noah Fatar	Angers	Sochaux	Undisclosed
31 August 2023	(Algeria) Zinedine Ferhat	(Turkey) Alanyaspor	Angers	Free
31 August 2023	(France) Matteo Guendouzi	Marseille	(Italy) Lazio	Loan
31 August 2023	(Sweden) Karl-Johan Johnsson	(Denmark) Copenhagen	Bordeaux	Free
31 August 2023	(France) Cheick Keita	Reims	Bastia	Loan
31 August 2023	(France) Thérence Koudou	Reims	Pau	Loan
31 August 2023	(France) Yanis Lhéry	Saint-Étienne	(Luxembourg) Progrès Niederkorn	Loan
31 August 2023	(Comoros) Youssouf M'Changama	Auxerre	Troyes	Undisclosed
31 August 2023	(Brazil) Metinho	Troyes	(Netherlands) Sparta Rotterdam	Loan
31 August 2023	(Canada) Goteh Ntignee	(Canada) Cavalry FC	Annecy	Loan
31 August 2023	(Switzerland) Fabian Rieder	(Switzerland) Young Boys	Rennes	Undisclosed
31 August 2023	(France) Mathys Saban	Saint-Étienne	(Luxembourg) Union Titus Pétange	Loan
31 August 2023	(Sweden) Amin Sarr	Lyon	(Germany) VfL Wolfsburg	Loan
31 August 2023	(France) Florian Tardieu	Troyes	Saint-Étienne	Undisclosed
31 August 2023	(France) Loum Tchaouna	Rennes	(Italy) Salernitana	Undisclosed
31 August 2023	(Netherlands) Mitchell van Bergen	Reims	(Netherlands) Twente	Undisclosed
31 August 2023	(Algeria) Kevin Van Den Kerkhof	Bastia	Metz	Undisclosed
1 September 2023	(France) Ruben Aguilar	Moncao	Lens	Undisclosed
1 September 2023	(Ivory Coast) Paul Akouokou	(Spain) Real Betis	Lyon	€3m
1 September 2023	(Senegal) Aliou Baldé	(Switzerland) Lausanne-Sport	Nice	Undisclosed
1 September 2023	(Belgium) Norman Bassette	SM Caen	(Belgium) KV Mechelen	Loan
1 September 2023	(Guinea) Mohamed Bayo	Lille	Le Havre	Loan
1 September 2023	(Spain) Juan Bernat	Paris Saint-Germain	(Portugal) Benfica	Loan
1 September 2023	(Algeria) Billal Brahimi	Nice	Brest	Loan
1 September 2023	(England) Andy Carroll	(England) Reading	Amiens	Free
1 September 2023	(France) Julien Célestine	(Hungary) Diósgyőri VTK	Concarneau	Undisclosed
1 September 2023	(France) Mehdi Chahiri	Strasbourg	Pau	Undisclosed
1 September 2023	(Mali) Kalifa Coulibaly	(Serbia) Red Star Belgrade	Quevilly-Rouen	Free
1 September 2023	(France) Colin Dagba	Paris Saint-Germain	Auxerre	Loan
1 September 2023	(Ecuador) Maiky de la Cruz	Reims	(Luxembourg) Union Titus Pétange	Loan
1 September 2023	(France) Adama Diakité	Clermont Foot	Trélissac	Loan
1 September 2023	(Mali) Kamory Doumbia	Reims	Brest	Loan
1 September 2023	(Norway) Aron Dønnum	(Belgium) Standard Liège	Toulouse	Undisclosed
1 September 2023	(Colombia) Óscar Estupiñán	(England) Hull City	Metz	Loan
1 September 2023	(France) Nehemiah Fernandez-Veliz	Paris Saint-Germain	Dunkerque	Undisclosed
1 September 2023	(Spain) Ismaël Gharbi	Paris Saint-Germain	(Switzerland) Stade Lausanne Ouchy	Loan
1 September 2023	(Senegal) Alfred Gomis	Rennes	Lorient	Loan
1 September 2023	(France) Christophe Hérelle	Brest	Metz	Undisclosed
1 September 2023	(Democratic Republic of the Congo) Yann Kitala	Le Havre	(Netherlands) Almere City	Loan
1 September 2023	(France) Mickaël Le Bihan	Dijon	Caen	Undisclosed
1 September 2023	(France) Julien Le Cardinal	Lens	Brest	Loan
1 September 2023	(France) Félix Lemaréchal	Monaco	(Belgium) Cercle Brugge	Loan
1 September 2023	(France) Johaneko Louis-Jean	Bordeaux	(Spain) Lugo	Loan
1 September 2023	(Switzerland) Josias Lukembila	(Switzerland) Wil	Paris	Undisclosed
1 September 2023	(France) Hiang'a Mbock	Brest	SM Caen	Loan
1 September 2023	(Ivory Coast) Bamo Meïté	Lorient	Marseille	Loan
1 September 2023	(Senegal) Nobel Mendy	Paris	(Spain) Real Betis B	Loan
1 September 2023	(Portugal) Diego Moreira	(England) Chelsea	Lyon	Loan
1 September 2023	(France) Vimoj Muntu Wa Mungu	Paris Saint-Germain	(Italy) Torino	Loan
1 September 2023	(France) Bridge Ndilu	Nantes	(Luxembourg) Swift Hesperange	Undisclosed
1 September 2023	(Jamaica) Shamar Nicholson	(Russia) Spartak Moscow	Clermont Foot	Loan
1 September 2023	(France) Niels Nkounkou	Saint-Étienne	(Germany) Eintracht Frankfurt	Undisclosed
1 September 2023	(Benin) Junior Olaitan	Niort	Troyes	Loan
1 September 2023	(France) Mathieu Patouillet	Lyon	Sochaux	Loan
1 September 2023	(France) Anthony Rouault	Toulouse	(Germany) VfB Stuttgart	Loan
1 September 2023	(Guadeloupe) Jordan Tell	Grenoble	Laval	Undisclosed
1 September 2023	(France) Alexis Tibidi	Troyes	(Netherlands) NEC	Loan
1 September 2023	(France) Isaak Touré	Marseille	Lorient	Undisclosed
1 September 2023	(Mali) Charles Traoré	Nantes	Bastia	Free
1 September 2023	(France) Hugo Vandermersch	SM Caen	(Germany) SV Elversberg	Loan
1 September 2023	(France) Romaric Yapi	(Netherlands) Vitesse	Bastia	Undisclosed
1 September 2023	(Italy) Kelvin Yeboah	(Italy) Genoa	Montpellier	Loan
