= 2023–24 Ligue 2 =

Ligue 2
- Season: 2023–24
- Dates: 5 August 2023 – 1 June 2024
- Champions: Auxerre
- Promoted: Auxerre; Angers; Saint-Étienne
- Relegated: Bordeaux; Concarneau; Quevilly-Rouen; Valenciennes
- Matches: 380
- Goals: 933 (2.46 per match)
- Top goalscorer: Alexandre Mendy (22 goals)
- Biggest home win: Guingamp 4–0 Pau (26 August 2023); Auxerre 4–0 Annecy (26 September 2023)
- Biggest away win: Dunkerque 0–5 Bastia (5 December 2023)
- Highest scoring: Rodez 5–3 Caen (7 October 2023)
- Longest winning run: 6 matches Laval
- Longest unbeaten run: 11 matches Grenoble
- Longest winless run: 16 matches Valenciennes
- Longest losing run: 5 matches Saint-Étienne; Dunkerque

The 2023–24 Ligue 2, commonly known as Ligue 2 BKT for sponsorship reasons, was the 85th season of Ligue 2. It began on 5 August 2023 and concluded on 1 June 2024.

== Teams ==
=== Changes ===
Concarneau (promoted for the first time in history from this season) and Dunkerque (promoted return after two years absence). Replacing Dijon and Nîmes (both relegated after two years in second tier) and Niort (relegated after eleven years in second tier). Later, Sochaux was administratively relegated after nine years in second tier and replaced by Annecy, that was originally relegated to National.

▲ from Championnat National	▲ to Ligue 1	▼ from Ligue 1	▼ to Championnat National
Concarneau; Dunkerque	Le Havre; Metz	Ajaccio; Angers; Auxerre; Troyes	Dijon; Nîmes; Niort; Sochaux (administrative relegation)

=== Promotion and Relegation ===
Due to the restructuring of the French football leagues, this season was the last with 20 teams as its number was reduced to 18 teams the following season. The top two teams were promoted to 2024–25 Ligue 1, while teams from 3rd to 5th played with the 16th-placed team from 2023–24 Ligue 1 in the promotion play-offs. The four last teams were relegated to 2024–25 Championnat National.

=== Stadiums and locations ===
Location of teams in 2023–24 Ligue 2

Club	Location	Venue	Capacity
Ajaccio	Ajaccio	Stade François Coty	10,446
Amiens	Amiens	Stade de la Licorne	12,097
Angers	Angers	Stade Raymond Kopa	18,752
Annecy	Annecy	Parc des Sports	15,660
Auxerre	Auxerre	Stade de l'Abbé-Deschamps	21,379
Bastia	Bastia	Stade Armand Cesari	16,078
Bordeaux	Bordeaux	Matmut Atlantique	42,115
Caen	Caen	Stade Michel d'Ornano	21,215
Concarneau	Concarneau	Stade Francis-Le Blé; Stade du Moustoir^{1}	15,931; 18,110
Dunkerque	Dunkerque	Stade Marcel-Tribut	4,933
Grenoble	Grenoble	Stade des Alpes	20,068
Guingamp	Guingamp	Stade de Roudourou	18,378
Laval	Laval	Stade Francis Le Basser	18,607
Paris FC	Paris	Stade Sébastien Charléty	19,151
Pau	Pau	Nouste Camp	4,031
Quevilly-Rouen	Rouen	Stade Robert Diochon	12,018
Rodez	Rodez	Stade Paul-Lignon	5,955
Saint-Étienne	Saint-Étienne	Stade Geoffroy-Guichard	42,000
Troyes	Troyes	Stade de l'Aube	21,684
Valenciennes	Valenciennes	Stade du Hainaut	25,172

- Since the Stade Guy-Piriou is not suitable for Ligue 2 regulations, Concarneau played at both the Stade Francis-Le Blé in Brest and the Stade du Moustoir in Lorient.

=== Personnel and kits ===
Team	Manager	Captain	Kit manufacturer	Sponsors (front)	Sponsors (back)	Sponsors (sleeve)	Sponsors (shorts)	Sponsors (socks)
Ajaccio	(France) Olivier Pantaloni	(France) Vincent Marchetti	Adidas	Cullettività di Corsica-Collectivité de Corse, Gamm Vert	Madewis	Air Corsica, AZ Habitat	Ajaccio, Europcar	None
Amiens	(Senegal) Omar Daf	(France) Régis Gurtner	Puma	Intersport, Igol Lubrifiants, Gueudet	Igol Lubrifiants	None	Amiens Métropole, E.Leclerc Rivery	None
Angers	(France) Alexandre Dujeux	(France) Pierrick Capelle	Nike	École Noir&Blanc, Maison de l'Atoll, Angers	None	None	Système U	None
Annecy	(France) Laurent Guyot	(France) Jean-Jacques Rocchi	Adidas	MSC Cruises, E.Leclerc Annecy, Mediaco Vrac, TeamWork	Stgenergy, Nissan Groupe Maurin	Tissier Technique	LP Charpente, Burger King	None
Auxerre	(France) Christophe Pélissier	(Brazil) Jubal	Macron	Acadomia, X1, SPPE, Servistores	LCR, X1	Groupama	Auxerre, Actis Location	None
Bastia	(France) Michel Moretti	(France) Christophe Vincent	Adidas	Oscaro Power, Corsica Ferries, Capembal, Roncaglia Blanchisserie, Collectivité de Corse, Coviag, Olivier Bleu, Smart Good Things, Casa di e Lingue	Payfoot, ESSE, Madewis	Groupe Actual, Asco6Tem	Burger King, Garage Corsa, CORSECARLOC	None
Bordeaux	(Spain) Albert Riera	(France) Yoann Barbet	Adidas	Crédit Mutuel du Sud-Ouest, Groupe Vital	MAT IN BAT, Bistro Régent	Cupra	Vigier Groupe, Meyva Fruits Secs	None
Caen	(France) Nicolas Seube	(France) Romain Thomas	Kappa	Starwash (H)/Saint James Clothing (A), Künkel, Thalazur	Imprimerie NII, Guilloux	Carrefour Ouistreham	Crédit Agricole Normandie, Printngo Publicité	None
Concarneau	(France) Stéphane Le Mignan	(France) Guillaume Jannez	Hummel	GUYOT Environment (H)/AR Collection Hôtels (A), Tanguy Materiaux (H), E.Leclerc (H), Piriou	Concarneau Cornouaille Agglomération (H), Charnel (H)/USINE ONLINE (A)	Concarneau	Barillec (H), Groupe SOFT (H)/Triangle Intérim (A)	None
Dunkerque	(Portugal) Luís Castro	(France) Demba Thiam	Adidas	Intersport, Dunkerque Communauté Urbaine, Topensi	DS Levage	2024 Vivre les JO #dunkerqueagglo Tous en bleu, blanc, rouge	Hauts-de-France, Onet	None
Grenoble	(France) Laurent Peyrelade	(France) Brice Maubleu	Nike	Vinci Immobilier (H)/Carrefour Market (A), Carrefour (H)/Vinci Immobilier (A), Smart Good Things, Grenoble Alpes Métropole	Chamrousse, Le Cabanon en Provence	None	LCR	None
Guingamp	(France) Stéphane Dumont	(France) Jérémy Livolant	Umbro	Celtigel, Creactuel, Breizh Cola, Ballay	Jardiman, Vital Concept	Cafés Coïc	Bernard Jarnoux Crêpier, Tibbloc	None
Laval	(France) Olivier Frapolli	(France) Jimmy Roye	Kappa	Lactel, La Mayenne Le Département, Laval Agglo	V and B Cave & Bar, Groupe Lucas, Mayenne	Groupe Actual	Laval Agglo, SEPAL, Aropiz	None
Paris	(France) Stéphane Gilli	(Martinique) Cyril Mandouki	Adidas	Bahrain Victorious, Lycamobile	Vinci	None		None
Pau	(France) Nicolas Usaï	(France) Antoine Batisse	Puma	Bullux Services, Pau, Casino de Pau, Intersport	Arobase Intérim, Brico Fenêtre	Bullux Services	Übi Care, Mansion Sports	None
Quevilly-Rouen	(France) Jean-Louis Garcia	(France) Alexandre Bonnet	Hummel	Matmut, Métropole Rouen Normandie, TPR, Intersport	SATEB	None	Vikings Auto	None
Rodez	(France) Didier Santini	(France) Rémy Boissier	Adidas	Maxoutil, E.Leclerc	JeanStation, Thermatic, Ville de Rodez, Aveyron, Rodez Agglomération, Occitanie	aveyron.fr	Intersport, Maxoutil, Andrieu Construction	None
Saint-Étienne	(France) Olivier Dall'Oglio	(France) Anthony Briançon	Hummel	Smart Good Things/Kelyps Intérim, Loire, BYmyCAR, Terroir Halles	Saint-Étienne La Métropole, ZEbet	Kelyps Intérim/Exaltan RH	Aésio Mutuelle, Desjoyaux	None
Troyes	(France) David Guion	(France) Xavier Chevalerin	Le Coq Sportif	LCR (H)/La Licorne Hotel & Spa (A), Troyes, norelem, Festilight	Sinfin, Amplitude Groupe Automobile	Century 21 Groupe Martinot	Huguier Frères	None
Valenciennes	(Morocco) Ahmed Kantari	(France) Joffrey Cuffaut	Acerbis	Tonsser/Association Emera, Groupe Dhollande, Spefinox	TSR	None	LCR, OCAD	None

== Managerial changes ==
Team	Outgoing manager	Manner of departure	Date of vacancy	Position in table	Incoming manager	Date of appointment
Caen	(France) Stéphane Moulin	Resigned	17 May 2023	Pre-season	(France) Jean-Marc Furlan	1 July 2023
Paris FC	(France) Thierry Laurey	Resigned	3 June 2023	Pre-season	(France) Stéphane Gilli	1 July 2023
Pau	(France) Didier Tholot	Sacked	9 June 2023	Pre-season	(France) Nicolas Usaï	1 July 2023
Amiens	(France) Patrice Descamps	End of tenure as caretaker	30 June 2023	Pre-season	(Senegal) Omar Daf	1 July 2023
Valenciennes	(Morocco) Ahmed Kantari	End of tenure as caretaker	30 June 2023	Pre-season	(Portugal) Jorge Maciel	5 July 2023
Dunkerque	(France) Mathieu Chabert	Sacked	24 September 2023	17th	(Portugal) Luís Castro	26 September 2023
Bordeaux	(France) David Guion	Sacked	7 October 2023	13th	(Spain) Albert Riera	11 October 2023
Caen	(France) Jean-Marc Furlan	Sacked	7 November 2023	12th	(France) Nicolas Seube	30 November 2023
Troyes	(Australia) Patrick Kisnorbo	Sacked	26 November 2023	17th	(France) David Guion	6 December 2023
Saint-Étienne	(France) Laurent Batlles	Sacked	6 December 2023	8th	(France) Olivier Dall'Oglio	12 December 2023
Valenciennes	(Portugal) Jorge Maciel	Sacked	6 December 2023	20th	(Morocco) Ahmed Kantari	6 December 2023
Quevilly-Rouen	(France) Olivier Echouafni	Sacked	15 January 2024	18th	(France) Jean-Louis Garcia	22 January 2024
Bastia	(France) Régis Brouard	Sacked	29 January 2024	16th	(France) Michel Moretti	29 December 2024
Grenoble	(France) Vincent Hognon	Sacked	13 March 2024	7th	(France) Laurent Peyrelade	15 March 2024

== League table ==
Pos	Team	Pld	W	D	L	GF	GA	GD	Pts	Promotion or Relegation
1	Auxerre (C, P)	38	21	11	6	72	36	+36	74	Promotion to Ligue 1
2	Angers (P)	38	20	8	10	56	42	+14	68	Promotion to Ligue 1
3	Saint-Étienne (O, P)	38	19	8	11	48	31	+17	65	Qualification for promotion play-offs final
4	Rodez	38	16	12	10	62	51	+11	60	Qualification for promotion play-offs semi-final
5	Paris FC	38	16	11	11	49	42	+7	59	Qualification for promotion play-offs semi-final
6	Caen	38	17	7	14	51	45	+6	58	
7	Laval	38	15	10	13	40	45	−5	55	
8	Amiens	38	12	17	9	36	36	0	53	
9	Guingamp	38	13	12	13	44	40	+4	51	
10	Pau	38	13	12	13	60	57	+3	51	
11	Grenoble	38	13	12	13	43	44	−1	51	
12	Bordeaux (D, R)	38	14	9	15	50	52	−2	50 (Note: Bordeaux were deducted 1 point due to federation decision.)	Demoted to National 2
13	Bastia	38	14	9	15	44	48	−4	50 (Note: Bastia were deducted 1 point due to federation decision.)	
14	Annecy	38	12	10	16	49	50	−1	46	
15	Ajaccio	38	12	10	16	35	46	−11	46	
16	Dunkerque	38	12	10	16	36	52	−16	46	
17	Troyes	38	9	14	15	42	50	−8	41	Spared from relegation
18	Quevilly-Rouen (R)	38	7	17	14	51	55	−4	38	Relegation to National
19	Concarneau (R)	38	10	8	20	39	57	−18	38	Relegation to National
20	Valenciennes (R)	38	6	11	21	26	54	−28	29	Relegation to National

Updated to match(es) played on 17 May 2024. Source: Ligue 2
Rules for classification: 1) Points; 2) Goal difference; 3) Number of goals scored; 4) Head-to-head goal difference; 5) Fair play points
(C) Champions; (D) Disqualified; (O) Play-off winners; (P) Promoted; (R) Relegated

== Results ==
Home \ Away	AJA	AMI	ANG	ANN	AUX	BAS	BOR	CAE	CON	DUN	GRE	GUI	LAV	QUE	PFC	PAU	ROD	STE	TRO	VAL
Ajaccio	—	0–0	1–1	1–3	0–1	2–0	0–0	2–1	1–0	2–2	1–2	3–0	2–0	1–1	2–1	2–0	1–1	2–0	1–0	2–1
Amiens	0–0	—	1–4	1–0	0–0	2–1	1–1	0–0	1–1	0–1	1–2	4–1	0–0	1–0	1–1	2–3	1–1	1–0	0–0	0–0
Angers	3–1	1–3	—	0–0	2–2	2–0	2–0	3–0	2–0	0–0	1–0	1–0	1–1	3–2	2–0	2–1	2–1	0–3	2–1	2–0
Annecy	2–0	1–1	1–2	—	0–2	3–2	3–1	1–2	0–3	3–0	0–1	1–4	1–3	0–0	2–2	0–0	1–2	1–1	0–0	2–1
Auxerre	2–0	0–1	1–0	4–0	—	1–1	3–1	2–1	4–1	0–1	0–0	1–1	4–0	3–2	2–0	2–2	3–1	5–2	2–0	0–0
Bastia	1–0	1–2	2–0	2–1	0–0	—	3–1	1–2	2–0	1–1	1–0	0–0	0–3	0–0	1–1	1–4	0–2	0–4	3–2	3–0
Bordeaux	4–0	2–0	1–0	3–1	2–4	2–3	—	1–1	1–0	2–0	1–0	1–0	0–1	0–0	3–3	3–2	2–2	0–0	0–1	3–1
Caen	3–0	2–0	2–0	2–1	1–1	1–0	0–1	—	1–0	1–0	1–2	0–1	1–0	3–3	0–1	2–0	1–0	1–2	0–0	3–0
Concarneau	2–1	0–0	2–4	1–1	1–2	0–0	4–2	0–2	—	4–3	0–3	2–3	1–3	0–0	2–2	1–2	1–2	0–1	1–0	1–0
Dunkerque	2–0	0–1	0–1	0–2	1–3	0–5	0–2	2–2	2–2	—	0–0	0–1	0–2	0–1	1–3	1–0	1–2	1–0	2–2	2–1
Grenoble	0–3	1–3	0–0	1–0	1–1	0–0	2–0	5–1	2–1	2–2	—	0–0	0–2	2–1	2–0	0–1	2–1	0–2	0–0	3–3
Guingamp	3–0	0–0	1–2	1–4	2–1	0–1	0–0	1–0	0–1	0–1	2–2	—	0–1	2–2	0–1	4–0	3–3	2–2	0–0	3–0
Laval	1–1	1–1	1–0	0–3	1–3	1–2	1–0	2–1	0–3		1–1	2–1	—	2–4	1–1	1–1	1–0	0–1	1–2	1–0
Quevilly-Rouen	0–1	3–3	0–1	1–2	4–3	0–1	3–2	1–2	2–3	1–2	1–1	0–1	0–0	—	0–0	2–2	3–1	2–1	1–1	0–0
Paris FC	2–0	3–0	3–1	2–1	0–2	1–0	1–2	0–2	3–0	1–2	2–1	2–1	0–1	2–2	—	1–1	2–0	0–0	3–2	2–1
Pau	1–1	1–0	4–4	0–3	2–2	1–2	3–0	2–3	2–0	1–1	3–2	1–2	3–0	0–2	2–0	—	2–2	0–1	1–1	3–1
Rodez	2–0	2–2	4–1	1–3	2–0	1–1	2–2	5–3	2–0	0–0	3–1	0–0	1–2	3–3	1–0	2–1	—	2–1	2–1	0–1
Saint-Étienne	0–0	0–1	2–0	2–1	1–0	3–2	2–1	1–0	1–0	2–0	0–1	1–3	0–0	2–1	0–1	1–2	1–1	—	5–0	0–0
Troyes	3–1	2–0	1–4	1–1	1–2	2–0	2–1	2–1	0–0	1–2	3–1	0–1	3–1	2–2	1–2	2–2	2–3	0–1	—	TBD
Valenciennes	1–0	0–1	0–0	0–0	1–4	3–1	1–2	2–2	0–1	0–1	2–0	0–0	1–1	2–1	0–1	1–4	0–2	0–2	1–1	—

Updated to match(es) played on 17 May 2024. Source: Ligue 2
Legend: Blue = home team win; Yellow = draw; Red = away team win.

== Promotion play-offs ==
A promotion play-off competition is held at the end of the season, involving the 3rd, 4th and 5th-placed teams in 2023–24 Ligue 2, and the 16th-placed team in 2023–24 Ligue 1.

The quarter-final was played on 21 May, and the semi-final on 24 May.

Quarter-final
4B	Rodez	2 (3)
5B	Paris FC	2 (2)

Semi-final
3B	Saint-Étienne	2
4B	Rodez	0

Final
3B	Saint-Étienne	2	2	4
16A	Metz	1	2	3

Quarter-final

21 May 2024
20:30 CEST (UTC+2)

Rodez	2–2	Paris FC
Danger 9' (pen.); Corredor 33'	Report	Dicko 4'; Dabila 90+6'
Penalties
Raux-Yao (penalty missed); Buadés (penalty missed); Haag (penalty missed); Danger (penalty scored); Corredor (penalty scored); Verdier (penalty scored)	3–2	(penalty scored) Gaudin; (penalty missed) Doucet; (penalty scored) Hamel; (penalty missed) Mandouki; (penalty missed) Jabbari; (penalty missed) Camara

Stade Paul-Lignon, Rodez
Referee: Hakim Ben El Hadj

Semi-final

24 May 2024
20:30 CEST (UTC+2)

Saint-Étienne	2–0	Rodez
Cardona 64'; Mbuku 90+6'	Report

Stade Geoffroy-Guichard, Saint-Étienne
Referee: Thomas Léonard

Promotion Play-off Final
1st leg

30 May 2024
20:30 CEST (UTC+2)

Saint-Étienne	2–1	Metz
Sissoko 19'; Cardona 80'	Report	Traoré 45'

Stade Geoffroy-Guichard, Saint-Étienne
Referee: Benoît Millot

2nd leg

2 June 2024
17:00 CEST (UTC+2)

Metz	2–2 (a.e.t.)	Saint-Étienne
Camara 17'; Mikautadze 25' (pen.)	Report	Pétrot 35'; Wadji 116'

Stade Saint-Symphorien, Metz
Referee: Jérôme Brisard

Saint-Étienne won 4–3 on aggregate and were promoted to Ligue 1, while Metz were relegated to Ligue 2.

== Season statistics ==
=== Top goalscorers ===
Rank	Player	Club	Goals
1	(Guinea-Bissau) Alexandre Mendy	Caen	22
2	(France) Loïs Diony	Angers	15
2	(Japan) Ado Onaiwu	Auxerre	15
2	(France) Moussa Sylla	Pau	15
2	(Central African Republic) Louis Mafouta	Amiens	15
6	(Benin) Andréas Hountondji	Rodez	14
7	(France) Kilian Corredor	Rodez	12
7	(Mauritania) Pape Ibnou Ba	Concarneau	12
7	(Senegal) Sambou Soumano	Quevilly-Rouen	12
7	(Mali) Kalifa Coulibaly	Quevilly-Rouen	12
7	(France) Migouel Alfarela	Bastia	12
7	(Mali) Ibrahim Sissoko	Saint-Étienne	12

== Attendances ==
AS Saint-Étienne drew the highest average home attendance in the 2023-24 edition of the Ligue 2.

#	Football club	Home games	Average attendance
1	AS Saint-Étienne	19	24,608
2	Girondins de Bordeaux	19	21,545
3	SM Caen	19	15,479
4	AJ Auxerre	19	14,936
5	SC Bastia	19	10,104
6	Angers SCO	19	9,420
7	EA Guingamp	19	8,649
8	Stade Lavallois	19	7,961
9	Amiens SC	19	6,953
10	Valenciennes FC	19	6,309
11	FC Annecy	19	6,230
12	Grenoble Foot 38	19	6,109
13	Paris FC	19	5,588
14	ESTAC	19	5,192
15	US Quevilly-Rouen	19	3,987
16	AC Ajaccio	19	3,928
17	USL Dunkerque	19	3,658
18	Pau FC	19	3,225
19	Rodez AF	19	2,946
20	US Concarneau	19	1,906
