= Matéo Loubatières =

French footballer (born 2003)

Personal information
- Date of birth: 15 September 2003 (age 23)
- Place of birth: Rodez, France
- Height: 1.75 m (5 ft 9 in)
- Position: Midfielder

Team information
- Current team: Istres (on loan from Bastia)
- Number: 10

Youth career
- 2009–2018: Rodez
- 2018–2022: Montpellier

Senior career*
Years	Team	Apps	(Gls)
2022–2023	Montpellier B	21	(9)
2023–	Bastia	9	(0)
2023–	Bastia B	11	(0)
2025–	→ Istres (loan)	17	(3)
- * Club domestic league appearances and goals as of 5 September 2025

Matéo Loubatières (born 15 September 2003) is a French professional footballer who plays as a midfielder for Championnat National 1 club Istres on loan from Bastia.

== Career ==
A product of the Rodez and Montpellier academies, Loubatières signed his first professional contract with Ligue 2 club Bastia in June 2023. He signed a three-year deal after having been on trial at the club for a month. On 2 September 2023, Loubatières made his professional debut for Bastia in a 0–0 draw against Grenoble.

== Career statistics ==
As of match played 2 October 2023

Appearances and goals by club, season and competition
Club	Season	League			Cup		Total	
Club	Season	Division	Apps	Goals	Apps	Goals	Apps	Goals
Montpellier B	2021–22	National 2	1	0	—		1	0
Montpellier B	2022–23	National 3	20	9	—		20	9
Montpellier B	Total		21	9	—		21	9
Bastia	2023–24	Ligue 2	2	0	0	0	2	0
Bastia B	2023–24	National 3	1	0	—		1	0
Career total			24	9	0	0	24	9
