= Serge-Philippe Raux-Yao =

French footballer (born 1999)

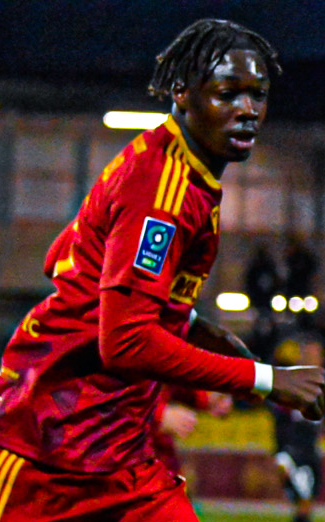
- Raux-Yao in 2023

Personal information
- Date of birth: 30 May 1999 (age 27)
- Place of birth: Pontoise, France
- Height: 1.97 m (6 ft 6 in)
- Position: Defender

Team information
- Current team: Rapid Wien
- Number: 6

Youth career
- 2004–2016: Cergy Pontoise
- 2016–2017: L'Entente SSG

Senior career*
Years	Team	Apps	(Gls)
2017–2020	Auxerre II	56	(3)
2019–2020	Auxerre	0	(0)
2020–2021	Cercle Brugge	3	(0)
2021–2024	Rodez	84	(1)
2024–	Rapid Wien	66	(2)
- * Club domestic league appearances and goals as of 24 October 2026

Serge-Philippe Raux-Yao (born 30 May 1999) is a French professional footballer who plays as a defender for Rapid Wien.

== Career ==
Raux-Yao is a youth product of Cergy Pontoise and L'Entente SSG, before joining AJ Auxerre in 2017. On 6 May 2020, Raux-Yao signed with Cercle Brugge. Raux-Yao made his professional debut with Cercle Brugge as a late sub in a 3-0 Belgian First Division A loss to Charleroi on 31 October 2020.

On 31 January 2022, Raux-Yao returned to France and signed with Ligue 2 club Rodez.

== Personal life ==
Born in France, Raux-Yao is of Ivorian descent.

== Career statistics ==
=== Club ===
As of match played 27 October 2026

Club	Season	League			Cup		Continental		Other		Total	
Club	Season	Division	Apps	Goals	Apps	Goals	Apps	Goals	Apps	Goals	Apps	Goals
Auxerre	2019–20	Ligue 2	0	0	1	0	—		—		1	0
Cercle Brugge	2020–21	Belgian First Division A	2	0	0	0	—		—		2	0
Cercle Brugge	2021–22	Belgian First Division A	1	0	0	0	—		—		1	0
Cercle Brugge	Total		3	0	0	0	—		—		3	0
Rodez	2021–22	Ligue 2	14	0	—		—		—		14	0
Rodez	2022–23	Ligue 2	31	1	5	0	—		—		36	1
Rodez	2023–24	Ligue 2	39	0	2	0	—		—		41	0
Rodez	Total		84	1	7	0	—		—		91	1
Rapid Wien	2024–25	Austrian Bundesliga	29	1	2	0	16 (Note: Six appearances and one goal in UEFA Europa League, ten appearances in UEFA Conference League)	1	—		47	2
Rapid Wien	2025–26	Austrian Bundesliga	27	0	4	0	6 (Note: Appearances in UEFA Conference League)	0	—		37	0
Rapid Wien	2026–27	Austrian Bundesliga	10	1	1	0	6	2	—		17	3
Rapid Wien	Total		66	2	7	0	28	3	—		101	5
Career total			153	3	15	0	28	3	0	0	196	6
