= Taïryk Arconte =

Guadeloupean footballer (born 2003)

Personal information
- Date of birth: 12 November 2003 (age 22)
- Place of birth: Les Abymes, Guadeloupe
- Height: 1.81 m (5 ft 11 in)
- Position: Right winger

Team information
- Current team: Millwall
- Number: 7

Youth career
- 2010–2015: SS Baie-Mahault
- 2015–2016: Stade Lamentinois
- 2016–2017: Moulien
- 2017–2019: US Baie-Mahault
- 2019–2021: Ajaccio

Senior career*
Years	Team	Apps	(Gls)
2021–2022	Ajaccio	22	(2)
2021–2022	Ajaccio B	8	(1)
2022–2024	Brest	4	(0)
2023–2024	→ Rodez (loan)	29	(6)
2024–2025	Pau	30	(3)
2025–2026	Rodez	30	(13)
2026–	Millwall	6	(3)

International career^{‡}
2022	France U19	4	(1)
2023–	Guadeloupe	7	(3)
- * Club domestic league appearances and goals as of 20:55, 16 September 2026 (UTC) ‡ National team caps and goals as of 16:39, 30 January 2026 (UTC)

Taïryk Arconte (born 12 November 2003) is a Guadeloupean professional footballer who plays as a right winger for EFL Championship club Millwall and the Guadeloupe national team.

== Club career ==
Arconte made his debut with Ajaccio in a 3–0 Ligue 2 win over Valenciennes on 3 April 2021.

On the final day of the 2022 summer transfer window, Arconte moved to Ligue 1 club Brest on a four-year contract.

On 21 August 2023, Arconte signed for Rodez on a season-long loan deal.

On 19 August 2025, Arconte returned to Rodez with a three-season contract.

In June 2026 he signed for English club Millwall.

== International career ==
Arconte was called up to the Guadeloupe national team for 2023–24 CONCACAF Nations League matches in September 2023.

== Career statistics ==
=== Club ===
As of match played 15 September 2026

Appearances and goals by club, season and competition
Club	Season	League			National cup (Note: Includes KNVB Cup, Coupe de France, DFB-Pokal, FA Cup)		Europe		Other		Total	
Club	Season	Division	Apps	Goals	Apps	Goals	Apps	Goals	Apps	Goals	Apps	Goals
Ajaccio	2020–21	Ligue 2	4	1	—		—		—		4	1
Ajaccio	2021–22	Ligue 2	18	1	1	0	—		—		19	1
Ajaccio	Total		22	2	1	0	—		—		23	2
Brest	2022–23	Ligue 1	4	0	1	0	—		—		5	0
Rodez (loan)	2023–24	Ligue 2	29	6	2	0	—		1 (Note: Appearances in Ligue 2 Promotion play-offs)	0	32	6
Pau	2024–25	Ligue 2	28	2	0	0	—		—		28	2
Pau	2025–26	Ligue 2	2	1	0	0	—		—		2	1
Pau	Total		30	3	0	0	—		—		30	3
Rodez	2025–26	Ligue 2	30	13	0	0	—		2	0	32	13
Millwall	2026–27	EFL Championship	6	3	0	0	—		2 (Note: Appearances in EFL Cup)	0	8	3
Career total			121	28	4	0	—		5	0	130	28
