= Bradley Danger =

French footballer (born 1998)

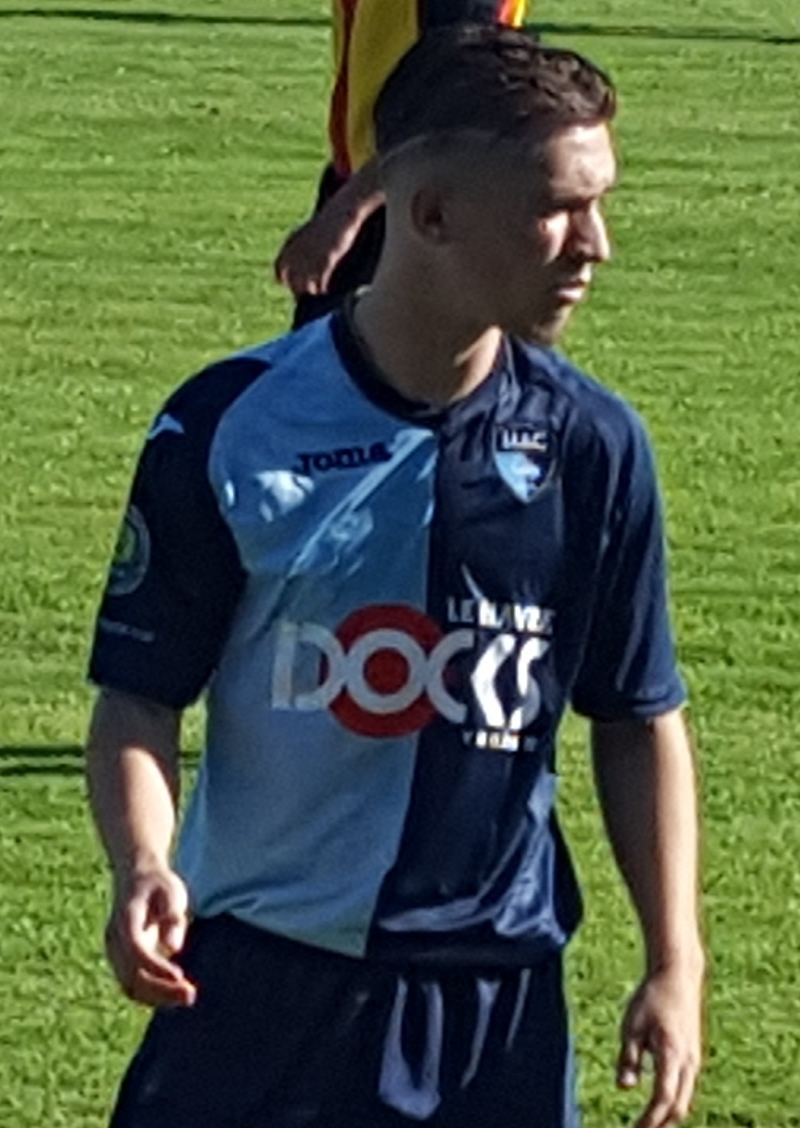
- Danger in 2016

Personal information
- Date of birth: 29 January 1998 (age 28)
- Place of birth: Mont-Saint-Aignan, France
- Height: 1.83 m (6 ft 0 in)
- Position: Defender

Team information
- Current team: Red Star
- Number: 27

Youth career
- 2005–2011: Doudevillaise
- 2011–2015: Le Havre

Senior career*
Years	Team	Apps	(Gls)
2015–2019	Le Havre II	56	(1)
2018–2019	→ Avranches (loan)	29	(0)
2019–2020	Avranches	22	(2)
2020–2021	Chambly	32	(2)
2021–2024	Rodez	108	(12)
2024–	Red Star	45	(2)

International career^{‡}
2014	France U16	8	(0)
2014–2015	France U17	7	(0)
2016	France U18	4	(0)
2016–2017	France U19	14	(0)
- * Club domestic league appearances and goals as of 11 May 2026 ‡ National team caps and goals as of 26 August 2020

Bradley Danger (born 29 January 1998) is a French professional footballer who plays for Red Star as a defender.

== Club career ==
Danger is a youth product of Le Havre, and signed a professional contract with them in June 2018 before joining Avranches on loan. He then signed with Avranches, and after a successful season joined FC Chambly on 16 May 2020. Danger made his professional debut with Chambly in a 3–0 Ligue 2 loss to Paris FC on 22 August 2020.

On 16 June 2021, he joined Rodez, ending his career there on 9 July 2024 to join Red Star.

== International career ==
Danger is a youth international for France, and represented the France U17s at the 2015 UEFA European Under-17 Championship.

== Honours ==
France U17

- UEFA European Under-17 Championship: 2015
