= Killian Corredor =

French footballer (born 2000)

Personal information
- Date of birth: 4 November 2000 (age 26)
- Place of birth: Montpellier, France
- Height: 1.82 m (6 ft 0 in)
- Position: Forward

Team information
- Current team: Nantes

Youth career
- 2014–2017: Rodez
- 2017–2018: Toulouse

Senior career*
Years	Team	Apps	(Gls)
2018–2021	Toulouse II	32	(12)
2021–2022	Rodez II	10	(4)
2021–2024	Rodez	89	(20)
2024–2026	Darmstadt 98	59	(13)
2026–	Nantes	0	(0)
- * Club domestic league appearances and goals as of 18 May 2026

Killian Corredor (born 4 November 2000) is a French professional footballer who plays as a forward for Ligue 2 club Nantes.

== Career ==
A youth product of Rodez, Corredor moved to the academy of Toulouse in 2017. In the summer of 2021, he left Toulouse's reserve team and joined Rodez as a senior player. He made his professional debut with Rodez in a 1–0 Ligue 2 loss to Auxerre on 21 September 2021.

On 15 August 2024, Corredor signed with Darmstadt 98 in German 2. Bundesliga.

On 14 July 2026, Corredor returned to France and signed a four-season contract with Nantes.

== Personal life ==
Corredor's father, Grégory Corredor, was a semi-pro footballer who also played for Rodez AF.
