= Stade Paul-Lignon =

French football stadium

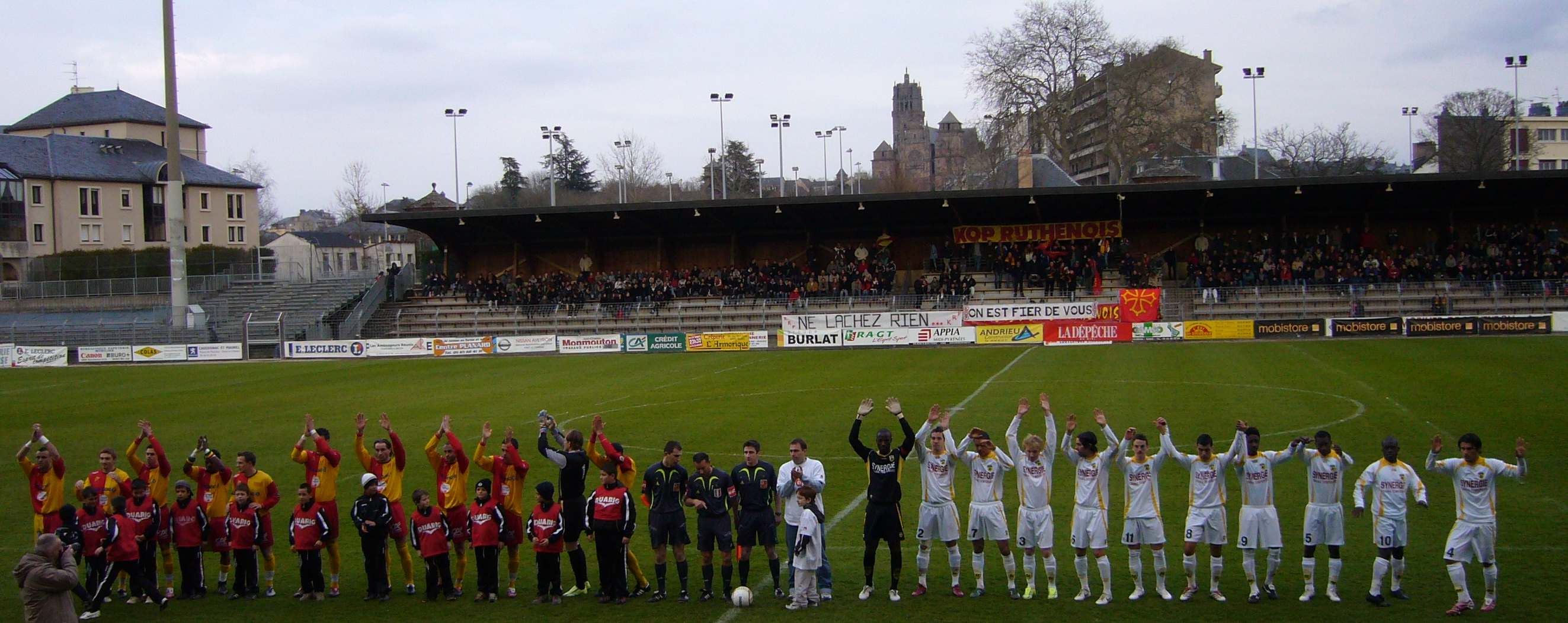
- Interactive map of Stade Paul-Lignon
- Location: Rodez, France
- Coordinates: 44°21′06″N 2°33′49″E
- Owner: City of Rodez
- Operator: Rodez
- Capacity: 5,955; 6,800 (after upgrade in 2024)
- Surface: Grass

Construction
- Opened: 1940s
- Renovated: 2019–

Tenants
- Rodez AF, Stade Rodez Aveyron

Stade Paul-Lignon (French pronunciation: [stad pɔl liɲɔ̃]) is a football stadium in Rodez, France. It is the current home of the football club Rodez AF. The stadium is able to hold 5,955 people and was opened during World War II.

On 20 December 2018, plans were made to increase the capacity of the stadium to 9,000 and to modernize the facilities by late 2021 or 2022. The stadium plans to comply with FFF and LFP standards as the club Rodez AF prepared for promotion into the professional Ligue 2.
