= Yannis Verdier =

French footballer (born 2003)

Personal information
- Date of birth: 29 July 2003 (age 23)
- Place of birth: France
- Height: 1.89 m (6 ft 2 in)
- Position: Forward

Team information
- Current team: Fleury
- Number: 7

Youth career
- –2020: Castelnau Le Crès
- 2021–2022: Béziers

Senior career*
Years	Team	Apps	(Gls)
2020–2021	Castelnau Le Crès		
2022–2023	Châteauroux B	17	(7)
2023	Châteauroux	5	(1)
2023–2025	Rodez	27	(2)
2025–2026	Châteauroux	24	(4)
2026–	Fleury	0	(0)
- * Club domestic league appearances and goals as of 23 June 2026

Yannis Verdier (born 29 July 2003) is a French professional footballer who plays as a forward for Ligue 3 club Fleury.

== Career ==
Hailing from Hérault, Verdier began his football career at Castelnau Le Crès. After playing for the Béziers under-19s, he signed for Châteauroux in 2022, being initially assigned to the reserve team. He went on to score seven goals in seventeen games in the Championnat National 3, earning him call-ups to play for the first team in the Championnat National in the second half of the 2022–23 season. At the end of the season, Verdier left Châteauroux on a free transfer to sign for Ligue 2 club Rodez.

On 24 July 2025, Verdier returned to Châteauroux.

== Style of play ==
Standing at a height of 1.89 meters, Verdier plays as a forward, and is capable of operating both down the center and on the wings. An ambidextrous player, he has been described as having "above-average technical quality". In August 2023, Rodez manager Didier Santini praised Verdier's technical skills, hold-up play, and movement off the ball.

== Personal life ==
Born in France, Verdier is of Algerian descent.

== Career statistics ==
As of match played 28 March 2025

Appearances and goals by club, season, and competition
Club	Season	League			Cup		Other		Total	
Club	Season	Division	Apps	Goals	Apps	Goals	Apps	Goals	Apps	Goals
Castelnau Le Crès	2020–21	Régional 1			2	0	—		2	0
Châteauroux B	2022–23	National 3	17	7	—		—		17	7
Châteauroux	2022–23	National	5	1	0	0	—		5	1
Rodez	2023–24	Ligue 2	14	1	2	1	2 (Note: Appearances in the Ligue 2 promotion play-offs)	0	18	2
Rodez	2024–25	Ligue 2	13	1	1	0	—		14	1
Rodez	Total		27	2	3	1	2	0	32	3
Career total			49	10	5	1	2	0	56	11
