= Raphaël Lipinski =

French footballer (born 2003)

Personal information
- Date of birth: 30 July 2002 (age 24)
- Place of birth: Poissy, France
- Height: 1.81 m (5 ft 11 in)
- Position: Left-back

Team information
- Current team: Rodez
- Number: 3

Youth career
- 2010–2016: FO Plaisir
- 2016–2018: Boulogne-Billancourt
- 2018–2021: Auxerre

Senior career*
Years	Team	Apps	(Gls)
2021–2023	Auxerre II	42	(1)
2023–	Rodez	72	(3)
- * Club domestic league appearances and goals as of 11 May 2026

Raphaël Lipinski (born 30 July 2002) is a French professional footballer who plays as a left-back for Ligue 2 club Rodez.

== Club career ==
Lipinski is a youth product of FO Plaisir, Boulogne-Billancourt and Auxerre. On 18 October 2018, he signed his first trainee contract with Auxerre. In 2021 he was promoted to Auxerre's reserves in the Championnat National 2 and came to captain the side for the 2022–23 season. On 2 August 2023, he transferred to the Ligue 2 side Rodez AF on a contract until 2025.

== Personal life ==
Born in France, Lipinski is of Polish and Congolese descent.
