= Lucas Buadés =

French footballer (born 1997)

Personal information
- Date of birth: 28 December 1997 (age 28)
- Place of birth: Muret, France
- Height: 1.81 m (5 ft 11 in)
- Position: Midfielder

Team information
- Current team: Le Mans
- Number: 18

Youth career
- Nîmes

Senior career*
Years	Team	Apps	(Gls)
2016–2020	Nîmes II	93	(7)
2017–2021	Nîmes	9	(0)
2021–2024	Rodez	78	(8)
2024–2025	Valenciennes	33	(6)
2025–	Le Mans	27	(3)
- * Club domestic league appearances and goals as of 11 May 2026

Lucas Buadés (born 28 December 1997) is a French professional footballer who plays as midfielder for Ligue 1 club Le Mans.

== Career ==
Buadés made his professional debut for Nîmes Olympique in a 1–0 Ligue 2 loss to LB Châteauroux on 21 August 2017. On 3 July 2019, he signed a professional contract with Nîmes. He extended his contract on 30 June 2020, keeping him at the club until 2022.

On 2 June 2023, during the last game of the 2022/23 Ligue 2 season in a match between Bordeaux and Rodez, the two teams were locked in a promotion and relegation battle. If Bordeaux won the match, it would have a chance at promotion while if Rodez won the match it would be saved from a chance at relegation. Buadés scored the opening goal for Rodez and celebrated in front of Bordeaux fans, prompting a Bordeaux fan to invade the pitch and push Buadés and Wilitty Younoussa to the ground. Buadés was concussed as a result of the attack and sent to the hospital, and subsequently the match was abandoned by match referee Nicholas Rainville. As a result of the attack, the LFP decided that Rodez would be given a 0–1 victory over Bordeaux, and that FC Annecy would be relegated in their place.

On 7 August 2024, Buadés moved to Valenciennes in Championnat National.
