= Hatim Far =

French footballer (born 2002)

Personal information
- Date of birth: 16 February 2002 (age 24)
- Place of birth: Rouen, France
- Height: 1.79 m (5 ft 10 in)
- Position: Forward

Team information
- Current team: Mondorf-les-Bains
- Number: 76

Senior career*
Years	Team	Apps	(Gls)
2019–2021	Troyes II	3	(0)
2021–2024	Rodez II	23	(19)
2021–2024	Rodez	13	(1)
2023	→ Paris 13 Atletico (loan)	12	(0)
2023	→ Toulon (loan)	8	(0)
2024	→ La Roche (loan)	14	(3)
2024	Melbourne Knights	4	(1)
2024–	Mondorf-les-Bains	22	(7)
- * Club domestic league appearances and goals as of 26 June 2025

Hatim Far (born 16 February 2002) is a French professional footballer who plays as a forward for Mondorf-les-Bains.

== Club career ==
Far began his senior career with the reserves of Troyes, before joining Rodez in the summer of 2021. He made his professional debut with Rodez in a 3–0 Ligue 2 win over Quevilly on 30 October 2021.

On 26 January 2023, Far was loaned to Paris 13 Atletico.

== Personal life ==
Born in France, Far is of Algerian descent and has dual nationality.
