= Andréas Hountondji =

Beninese footballer (born 2002)

Personal information
- Full name: Andréas William Edwin Hountondji
- Date of birth: 11 July 2002 (age 24)
- Place of birth: Montry, France
- Height: 1.90 m (6 ft 3 in)
- Position: Forward

Team information
- Current team: Burnley
- Number: 17

Youth career
- –2018: Meaux
- 2018–2019: Torcy

Senior career*
| Years | Team | Apps | (Gls) |
| 2019–2022 | Caen II | 28 | (11) |
| 2019–2024 | Caen | 31 | (2) |
| 2022–2023 | → Quevilly-Rouen II (loan) | 3 | (1) |
| 2022–2023 | → Quevilly-Rouen (loan) | 7 | (0) |
| 2023 | → Orléans (loan) | 15 | (6) |
| 2023–2024 | → Rodez (loan) | 34 | (14) |
| 2024– | Burnley | 19 | (2) |
| 2025 | → Standard Liège (loan) | 18 | (4) |
| 2025–2026 | → FC St. Pauli (loan) | 21 | (4) |

International career^{‡}
| 2023– | Benin | 20 | (3) |
- * Club domestic league appearances and goals as of 09:42, 8 November 2026 (UTC) ‡ National team caps and goals as of 10:11, 19 November 2025 (UTC)

Andréas William Edwin Hountondji (born 11 July 2002) is a professional footballer who plays as a forward for EFL Championship club Burnley. Born in France, he plays for the Benin national team.

== Club career ==
On 27 June 2019, Hountondji signed his first professional contract with Caen. He made his professional debut with Caen in a 1–1 Ligue 2 tie with Pau on 3 April 2021.

On 27 June 2022, Hountondji moved to Quevilly-Rouen on a season-long loan. On 12 January 2023, he went on a new loan to Orléans.

=== Rodez ===
On 20 July 2023, it was announced that he would join fellow Ligue 2 club Rodez on a season-long loan with an option to buy. He scored his first goal for the club on 16 September 2023 against Angers, before scoring 13 more goals in Ligue 2 to become Rodez's all-time top scorer in a season in that division. He also scored two goals in the Coupe de France as they made it to the Round of 32, taking his tally up to 16. He registered seven assists in all competitions in an outstanding campaign for Rodez as they finished in an unexpected 4th place in the table, qualifying for the promotion play-offs where they lost out in the semi-final to eventual winners Saint-Étienne.

=== Burnley ===
Following his successful loan spell with Rodez, Hountondji was much sought after around Europe and on 17 July 2024, he signed for newly-relegated Championship side Burnley on a four-year contract for an undisclosed fee, believed to be in the region of £3.4m. On signing he stated, "I feel excited. I chose to come here because of the big interest shown from the club. It’s a club that gives opportunities to young players, so this is one of the big reasons I chose to be here". He initially found game time hard to come by, making his debut in the first home game of the season against Cardiff City, coming on as a substitute for Luca Koleosho. He was in the starting lineup a week later in the defeat at Sunderland and then again four days later in the defeat at Wolverhampton Wanderers in the EFL Cup. He added six further substitute appearances with his only other start of the season coming at Millwall in November. All of his three starts for the club culminated in three of Burnley's four defeats in the 2024–25 season.

=== Standard Liège ===
Having not played for Burnley for over a month, Hountondji joined Belgian Pro League side Standard Liège on 7 January 2025 for the remainder of the season on loan. He initially struggled to make an impact only making two starts in his first ten appearances, but broke into the side towards the end of his loan with three of his four goals for Standard coming in the UEFA Europa League play-offs as they had a disappointing end to the campaign, failing to win any of the last ten matches. He made 18 appearances for the side, also registering two assists.

=== FC St. Pauli ===
Following on from Burnley's promotion to the Premier League, Houtondji again was sent out on loan on 8 July 2025 and joined Bundesliga club FC St. Pauli on a season-long loan deal.

== International career ==
Born and raised in Montry, France, Hountondji was born to a Beninese father and French mother and holds both citizenships. On 17 June 2023, he made his debut for Benin in a 2023 Africa Cup of Nations qualification match against Senegal, coming on as a substitute in a 1–1 draw. He only appeared in two qualifiers with Benin ultimately failing to qualify for the 2023 Africa Cup of Nations after finishing third in the group. He scored his first international goal on 11 October 2024, scoring the second in a 3–0 win over Rwanda in a 2025 Africa Cup of Nations qualifier. He scored again four days later in the return fixture in Rwanda.

== Style of play ==
Hountondji is a versatile forward who is capable of playing in various different positions across the frontline but plays mainly in the central forward position. St Pauli Director, Andreas Bornemann, described Andréas as a player that "combines physical presence with dynamism, pace, and technical potential", with Head Coach, Alexander Blessin, adding "Andréas impresses with his good timing in deep areas, strong finishing with both feet, a natural presence in the air, and high assertiveness".

== Career statistics ==
=== Club ===
As of match played 7 November 2026

Appearances and goals by club, season and competition
| Club | Season | League | | | National cup (Note: Includes Coupe de France, DFB-Pokal) | | League cup (Note: Includes EFL Cup) | | Other | | Total | |
| Club | Season | Division | Apps | Goals | Apps | Goals | Apps | Goals | Apps | Goals | Apps | Goals |
|---|---|---|---|---|---|---|---|---|---|---|---|---|
| Caen | 2019–20 | Ligue 2 | 0 | 0 | 1 | 0 | 0 | 0 | — | | 1 | 0 |
| Caen | 2020–21 | Ligue 2 | 6 | 1 | 0 | 0 | — | | — | | 6 | 1 |
| Caen | 2021–22 | Ligue 2 | 25 | 1 | 1 | 0 | — | | — | | 26 | 1 |
| Caen | Total | | 31 | 2 | 2 | 0 | 0 | 0 | — | | 33 | 2 |
| Quevilly-Rouen (loan) | 2022–23 | Ligue 2 | 7 | 0 | 1 | 0 | — | | — | | 8 | 0 |
| Orléans (loan) | 2022–23 | Championnat National | 15 | 6 | — | | — | | — | | 15 | 6 |
| Rodez (loan) | 2023–24 | Ligue 2 | 34 | 14 | 3 | 2 | — | | 2 (Note: Appearances in Ligue 2 promotion play-offs) | 0 | 39 | 16 |
| Burnley | 2024–25 | Championship | 9 | 0 | — | | 1 | 0 | — | | 10 | 0 |
| Burnley | 2026–27 | Championship | 10 | 2 | 0 | 0 | 0 | 0 | — | | 10 | 2 |
| Burnley | Total | | 19 | 2 | 0 | 0 | 1 | 0 | — | | 20 | 2 |
| Standard Liège (loan) | 2024–25 | Belgian Pro League | 18 | 4 | — | | — | | — | | 18 | 4 |
| FC St. Pauli (loan) | 2025–26 | Bundesliga | 21 | 4 | 2 | 0 | — | | — | | 23 | 4 |
| Career total | | | 145 | 32 | 8 | 2 | 1 | 0 | 2 | 0 | 156 | 34 |

=== International ===
As of match played 18 November 2025

Appearances and goals by national team and year
| National team | Year | Apps | Goals |
|---|---|---|---|
Benin
| Benin | 2023 | 6 | 0 |
| Benin | 2024 | 7 | 2 |
| Benin | 2025 | 7 | 1 |
| Total | | 20 | 3 |

Scores and results list Benin's goal tally first.

| No. | Date | Venue | Opponent | Score | Result | Competition |
|---|---|---|---|---|---|---|
| 1. | 11 October 2024 | Felix Houphouet Boigny Stadium, Abidjan, Ivory Coast | Rwanda | 2–0 | 3–0 | 2025 Africa Cup of Nations qualification |
| 2. | 15 October 2024 | Amahoro Stadium, Kigali, Rwanda | Rwanda | 1–0 | 1–2 | 2025 Africa Cup of Nations qualification |
| 3. | 9 September 2025 | Felix Houphouet Boigny Stadium, Abidjan, Ivory Coast | Lesotho | 2–0 | 4–0 | 2026 FIFA World Cup qualification |
