= Sambou Soumano =

Senegalese footballer (born 2001)

Personal information
- Date of birth: 13 January 2001 (age 25)
- Place of birth: Dakar, Senegal
- Height: 1.82 m (6 ft 0 in)
- Position: Forward

Team information
- Current team: Reims
- Number: 99

Youth career
- Youth Elite Foot

Senior career*
Years	Team	Apps	(Gls)
2019–2020	Pau B	13	(8)
2019	Pau	1	(0)
2020–2021	Châteaubriant	4	(3)
2021–2022	Lorient B	11	(13)
2021–2026	Lorient	84	(21)
2022–2023	→ Eupen (loan)	7	(1)
2023	→ Rodez (loan)	19	(2)
2023–2024	→ Quevilly-Rouen (loan)	36	(12)
2026–	Reims	0	(0)
- * Club domestic league appearances and goals as of 19 May 2026

Sambou Soumano (born 13 January 2001) is a Senegalese professional footballer who plays as a forward for French Ligue 2 club Reims.

== Career ==
A product of the Senegalese academy Youth Elite Foot, Soumano began his senior career with the French club Pau, and followed that with a stint at Châteaubriant. On 19 August 2021, he transferred to the reserve side of FC Lorient. He made his professional debut as a late substitute with Lorient in a 1–1 Ligue 1 tie over Bordeaux on 24 October 2021

On 20 August 2022, Soumano joined Eupen in Belgium on a season-long loan. On 18 January 2023, he moved on a new loan to Rodez in Ligue 2. On 2 August 2023, Soumano was loaned to Quevilly-Rouen, also in Ligue 2.

On 7 July 2026, Soumano moved to Reims in Ligue 2 with a four-year contract.

== Career statistics ==
As of match played 17 May 2026

Appearances and goals by club, season and competition
Club	Season	League			Cup		Other		Total	
Club	Season	Division	Apps	Goals	Apps	Goals	Apps	Goals	Apps	Goals
Pau B	2019–20	National 3	13	8	—		—		13	8
Pau	2019–20	National	1	0	0	0	—		1	0
Châteaubriant	2020–21	National 2	4	3	6	3	—		10	6
Lorient B	2021–22	National 2	11	13	—		—		11	13
Lorient	2021–22	Ligue 1	21	3	1	0	—		22	3
Lorient	2022–23	Ligue 1	0	0	0	0	——		0	0
Lorient	2023–24	Ligue 1	0	0	0	0	——		0	0
Lorient	2024–25	Ligue 2	32	14	2	0	——		34	14
Lorient	2025–26	Ligue 2	31	4	2	0	——		33	4
Lorient	Total		84	21	5	0	—		89	21
Eupen (loan)	2022–23	Belgian Pro League	7	1	1	0	—		8	1
Rodez (loan)	2022–23	Ligue 2	19	2	2	0	—		21	2
Quevilly-Rouen (loan)	2023–24	Ligue 2	36	12	2	3	—		38	15
Career total			175	60	16	6	0	0	191	66

== Honours ==
Lorient

- Ligue 2: 2024–25
