= Giovanni Haag =

French footballer (born 2000)

Personal information
- Date of birth: 30 May 2000 (age 26)
- Place of birth: Metz, France
- Height: 1.83 m (6 ft 0 in)
- Position: Midfielder

Team information
- Current team: Lion City Sailors
- Number: 24

Senior career*
Years	Team	Apps	(Gls)
2017–2022	Nancy B	22	(2)
2018–2023	Nancy	53	(5)
2020	→ Gazélec Ajaccio (loan)	7	(0)
2023–2024	Rodez	37	(3)
2024–2026	Fortuna Düsseldorf	27	(2)
2025–2026	→ Red Star (loan)	26	(1)
2026–	Lion City Sailors	4	(2)
- * Club domestic league appearances and goals as of 25 October 2026

Giovanni Haag (born 20 May 2000) is a French professional footballer who plays as a midfielder for Singapore Premier League club Lion City Sailors.

== Career ==
Haag made his professional debut with Nancy in a 1–0 Ligue 2 win over Red Star on 23 November 2018.

On 10 July 2023, Haag signed a two-year contract with Rodez.

On 30 August 2024, Haag moved to Fortuna Düsseldorf in Germany, scoring twice as the club finished sixth in the 2. Bundesliga. On 1 September 2025, Haag returned to France and joined Red Star in Ligue 2, featuring in 27 of a possible 31 league matches and helping the Parisian club finish fourth, just four points shy of automatic promotion to Ligue 1. Of his 116 Ligue 2 appearances, 53 came for boyhood club Nancy, where he made his professional debut in 2018. He also went on to represent Rodez AF and Red Star FC in the same division.

=== Lion City Sailors ===
Haag was announced on 4 August 2026 as the latest addition for Singapore Premier League champions Lion City Sailors, signing on a 2-year deal.

== Personal life ==
Haag is of Italian descent through his mother, who died when he was 15 years old.
