= 2023–24 US Concarneau season =

US Concarneau's 2023-2024 season in the French second division

US Concarneau
2023–24 season
- President: Jacques Piriou
- Manager: Stéphane Le Mignan
- Stadium: Stade du Moustoir; Stade Francis-Le Blé; Stade de Roudourou
- Ligue 2: 19th
- Coupe de France: Seventh round
| Home colours | Away colours | Third colours |

The 2023–24 season is Concarneau' 1st in the Ligue 2. They will also compete in the Coupe de France.

== Players ==
=== First-team squad ===
As of 30 January 2024.

Note: Flags indicate national team as defined under FIFA eligibility rules; some limited exceptions apply. Players may hold more than one non-FIFA nationality.

| No. | Pos. | Nation | Player |
|---|---|---|---|
| 1 | GK | FRA | Maxime Pattier |
| 2 | DF | FRA | Alec Georgen |
| 3 | DF | MAR | Abdelwahed Wahib |
| 4 | DF | FRA | Guillaume Jannez |
| 5 | DF | FRA | Mamadou Sylla |
| 6 | MF | FRA | Alexandre Phliponeau |
| 7 | FW | FRA | Isaac Matondo |
| 8 | MF | FRA | Tom Lebeau |
| 9 | FW | FRA | Noha Ndombasi |
| 10 | FW | FRA | Fahd El Khoumisti |
| 11 | FW | CAF | Axel Urie |
| 12 | DF | FRA | Julien Célestine |
| 13 | FW | CGO | Bevic Moussiti-Oko |
| 14 | FW | MTN | Pape Ibnou Ba |
| 15 | MF | SUI | Gabriel Barès (on loan from Montpellier) |
| 17 | MF | FRA | Maxime Etuin |

| No. | Pos. | Nation | Player |
|---|---|---|---|
| 18 | FW | FRA | Yanis Merdji |
| 19 | FW | GUI | Kandet Diawara (on loan from Le Havre) |
| 20 | MF | FRA | Baptiste Mouazan |
| 21 | FW | MAR | Nassim Chadli (on loan from Le Havre) |
| 22 | FW | FRA | Clément Rodrigues |
| 23 | DF | FRA | Romain Sans |
| 24 | FW | CIV | Ambroise Gboho |
| 25 | MF | FRA | Bryan Pelé |
| 26 | MF | FRA | Thibault Sinquin |
| 27 | MF | FRA | Rémi Maugain |
| 28 | DF | BFA | Issouf Paro |
| 29 | MF | FRA | Pierre Jouan |
| 30 | GK | FRA | Esteban Salles |
| 33 | DF | FRA | Julien Faussurier |
| 40 | GK | FRA | Rudy Boulais |

== Transfers ==
=== In ===
| Pos. | Player | Transferred from | Fee | Date | Source |
|---|---|---|---|---|---|
| GK | (France) Rudy Boulais | (France) Quevilly | Free | 4 July 2023 | |
| GK | (France) Esteban Salles | (France) Grenbole | Free | 17 July 2023 | |
| DF | (Morocco) Abdelwahed Wahib | (France) Le Havre | Free | 27 July 2023 | |
| DF | (France) Julien Faussurier | (France) Sochaux | Free | 27 July 2023 | |
| DF | (France) Julien Célestine | (Hungary) Diósgyőri VTK | Free | 1 September 2023 | |
| MF | (France) Baptiste Mouazan | (France) Nancy | Free | 28 July 2023 | |
| MF | (France) Alexandre Phliponeau | (France) Annecy | Free | 5 August 2023 | |
| MF | (France) Bryan Pelé | Club-Free | Free | 9 August 2023 | |
| MF | (Switzerland) Gabriel Barès | (France) Montpellier | Loan | 26 August 2023 | |
| FW | (France) Isaac Matondo | (France) Les Herbiers | Free | 24 June 2023 | |
| FW | (Morocco) Nassim Chadli | (France) Le Havre | Loan | 2 August 2023 | |
| FW | (France) Noha Ndombasi | (Switzerland) St. Gallen | Free | 21 August 2023 | |
| FW | (France) Yanis Merdji | (France) Niort | Free | 23 August 2023 | |
| FW | (Mauritania) Pape Ibnou Ba | (France) Le Havre | Loan | 30 August 2023 | |
| FW | (Republic of the Congo) Bevic Moussiti-Oko | (Turkey) Boluspor | Free | 18 January 2024 | |
| FW | (Guinea) Kandet Diawara | (France) Le Havre | Loan | 30 January 2024 | |

=== Out ===
| Pos. | Player | Transferred to | Fee | Date | Source |
|---|---|---|---|---|---|
| GK | (France) Léopold Maitre | (France) Blois | Free | 11 July 2023 | |
| GK | (France) Théo Cozzi-Buet | Club-free | Free | 15 June 2023 | |
| DF | (France) Kylian Le Her | (France) Borgo | Free | 15 June 2023 | |
| DF | (France) Adrien Julloux | (France) GOAL FC | Free | 7 July 2023 | |
| MF | (France) Amine Boutrah | (Netherlands) Vitesse | Free | 28 June 2023 | |
| MF | (France) Faissal Mannai | (Tunisia) Monastir | Free | 29 June 2023 | |
| FW | (France) Axel Camblan | (France) Brest | Loan return | 26 May 2023 | |
| FW | (France) Antoine Rabillard | (France) Le Mans | Free | 20 June 2023 | |
| FW | (France) Gaoussou Traoré | (Serbia) FK Radnički Niš | Free | 29 June 2023 | |
| FW | (New Caledonia) Georges Gope-Fenepej | (France) Saint-Pryvé Saint-Hilaire | Free | 20 July 2023 | |

== Pre-season and friendlies ==
| 15 July 2023 Friendly | Lorient (France) | 3–3 | (France) Concarneau | Ploemeur |
| 11:00 CEST (UTC+2) | Kroupi 37'; Soumano 51'; Aouchiche 80' | Report | El Khoumisti 2' 45'; Lebeau 61' | Stadium: Stade municipal |

| 19 July 2023 Friendly | Rennes (France) | 1–1 | (France) Concarneau | Rennes |
| 17:00 CEST (UTC+2) | Abline 73' | Report | El Khoumisti 52' | Stadium: Centre d'entraînement - La Piverdière |

| 22 July 2023 Friendly | Brest (France) | 2–1 | (France) Concarneau | Plouvorn |
| 18:00 UTC+2 | Pereira Lage 12'; Camblan 66' | Report | Phliponeau 16' | Stadium: Stade Guy de Reals |

| 29 July 2023 Friendly | Avranches (France) | 1–1 | (France) Concarneau | Avranches |
| 17:00 CEST (UTC+2) | Lemeray 40' | Report | El Khoumisti 10' | Stadium: Stade René Fenouillère |

== Competitions ==
| Competition | First match | Last match | Starting round | Final position | Record | | | | | | | |
| Competition | First match | Last match | Starting round | Final position | Pld | W | D | L | GF | GA | GD | Win % |
|---|---|---|---|---|---|---|---|---|---|---|---|---|
| Ligue 2 | 5-7 August 2023 | 17 May 2024 | Matchday 1 | | 38 | 10 | 8 | 20 | 39 | 57 | −18 | 26.32 |
| Coupe de France | 17 November 2023 | 17 November 2023 | Seventh round | Seventh round | 1 | 0 | 1 | 0 | 3 | 3 | +0 | 0.00 |
| Total | | | | | 39 | 10 | 9 | 20 | 42 | 60 | −18 | 25.64 |

Source: Competitions

=== League table ===
| Pos | Team | Pld | W | D | L | GF | GA | GD | Pts | Promotion or Relegation |
|---|---|---|---|---|---|---|---|---|---|---|
| 16 | Dunkerque | 38 | 12 | 10 | 16 | 36 | 52 | −16 | 46 | |
| 17 | Troyes | 38 | 9 | 14 | 15 | 42 | 50 | −8 | 41 | Spared from relegation |
| 18 | Quevilly-Rouen (R) | 38 | 7 | 17 | 14 | 51 | 55 | −4 | 38 | Relegation to National |
| 19 | Concarneau (R) | 38 | 10 | 8 | 20 | 39 | 57 | −18 | 38 | Relegation to National |
| 20 | Valenciennes (R) | 38 | 6 | 11 | 21 | 26 | 54 | −28 | 29 | Relegation to National |

Updated to match(es) played on 17 May 2024. Source: Ligue 2
Rules for classification: 1) Points; 2) Goal difference; 3) Number of goals scored; 4) Head-to-head goal difference; 5) Fair play points
(R) Relegated

==== Matches ====
The league fixtures were unveiled on 29 June 2023.

| 5 August 2023 1 | Concarneau | 0–0 | Bastia | Guingamp |
| 19:00 CEST (UTC+2) | | Report | | Stadium: Stade de Roudourou; Attendance: 1,875; Referee: Guillaume Paradis |

| 14 August 2023 2 | Bordeaux | 1–0 | Concarneau | Bordeaux |
| 20:45 CEST (UTC+2) | Barbet 90+6' (pen.) | Report | | Stadium: Matmut Atlantique; Attendance: 24,574; Referee: Aurélien Petit |

| 19 August 2023 3 | Concarneau | 0–2 | Caen | Brest |
| 19:00 CEST (UTC+2) | | Report | Mendy 53' (pen.); Abdi 90+2' | Stadium: Stade Francis-Le Blé; Attendance: 3,001; Referee: Thierry Bouille |

| 26 August 2023 4 | Paris | 3–0 | Concarneau | Troyes |
| 19:00 CEST (UTC+2) | Diaby-Fadiga 41'; Hamel 74' 83' | Report | | Stadium: Stade de l'Aube; Attendance: 537; Referee: Olivier Thual |

| 2 September 2023 5 | Concarneau | 1–1 | Annecy | Guingamp |
| 19:00 CEST (UTC+2) | Merdji 65' | Report | Caddy 28' (pen.) | Stadium: Stade de Roudourou; Attendance: 922; Referee: Guillaume Paradis |

| 16 September 2023 6 | Quevilly | 2–3 | Concarneau | Le Petit-Quevilly |
| 19:00 CEST (UTC+2) | Soumano 83'; Georgen 90+3' (o.g.) | Report | Chadli 28'; Ba 35'; Merdji 45+2' | Stadium: Stade Robert Diochon; Attendance: 2,635; Referee: Mickael Leleu |

| 23 September 2023 7 | Concarneau | 0–1 | Saint-Étienne | Lorient |
| 19:00 CEST (UTC+2) | | Report | Sissoko 72' | Stadium: Stade du Moustoir; Attendance: 6,010; Referee: Antoine Valnet |

| 26 September 2023 8 | Valenciennes | 0–1 | Concarneau | Valenciennes |
| 20:45 CEST (UTC+2) | | Report | Etuin 31' (pen.) | Stadium: Stade du Hainaut; Attendance: 5,591; Referee: Abdelatif Kherradji |

| 30 September 2023 9 | Angers | 2–0 | Concarneau | Angers |
| 19:00 CEST (UTC+2) | Diony 77'; El Melali 90+6' | Report | | Stadium: Stade Raymond Kopa; Attendance: 5,487; Referee: Benjamin Lepaysant |

| 7 October 2023 10 | Concarneau | 4–3 | Dunkerque | Lorient |
| 19:00 CEST (UTC+2) | Chadli 7', 78'; Ba 63', 90+4' | Report | Anziani 23'; Orelien 41' (pen.); Ba-Sy 66' | Stadium: Stade du Moustoir; Attendance: 1,921; Referee: Rémi Landry |

| 22 October 2023 11 | Troyes | 0–0 | Concarneau | Troyes |
| 19:00 CEST (UTC+2) | | Report | | Stadium: Stade de l'Aube; Attendance: 5,326; Referee: Faouzi Benchabane |

| 28 October 2023 12 | Concarneau | 2–1 | Ajaccio | Lorient |
| 19:00 CEST (UTC+2) | Ba 75', 83' | Report | Bammou 67' | Stadium: Stade du Moustoir; Attendance: 1,937; Referee: Olivier Thual |

| 11 November 2023 14 | Laval | 0–3 | Concarneau | Laval |
| 19:00 CEST (UTC+1) | | Report | Mouazan 21'; Ouaneh 53' (o.g.); Lebeau 90+3' (pen.) | Stadium: Stade Francis Le Basser; Attendance: 8,725; Referee: Rémy Landry |

| 25 November 2023 15 | Amiens | 1–1 | Concarneau | Amiens |
| 19:00 CEST (UTC+1) | Kakuta 37' | Report | Ndombasi 9' | Stadium: Stade de la Licorne; Attendance: 5,575; Referee: Mickaël Leleu |

| 28 November 2023 13 | Concarneau | 1–2 | Pau | Guingamp |
| 19:00 CEST (UTC+1) | Merdji 62' | Report | Jannez 30' (o.g.); Bassouamina 46' | Stadium: Stade de Roudourou; Attendance: 690; Referee: Mikaël Lesage |

| 2 December 2023 16 | Rodez | 2–0 | Concarneau | Rodez |
| 19:00 CEST (UTC+1) | Danger 15'; Hountondji 62' | Report | | Stadium: Stade Paul-Lignon; Attendance: 2,823; Referee: Karim Abed |

| 5 December 2023 17 | Concarneau | 1–2 | Auxerre | Brest |
| 20:45 CEST (UTC+1) | Mouazan 89' | Report | 16' Perrin; 38' Jubal | Stadium: Stade Francis-Le Blé; Attendance: 1,570; Referee: Azzédine Souifi |

| 16 December 2023 18 | Guingamp | 0-1 | Concarneau | Guingamp |
| 19:00 CEST (UTC+1) | | Report | Mouazan 70' | Stadium: Stade de Roudourou; Attendance: 12.456; Referee: Guillaume Paradis |

| 19 December 2023 19 | Concarneau | 0–3 | Grenoble | Lorient |
| 20:45 CEST (UTC+1) | | Report | 37', 85' Ba; 46' Joseph | Stadium: Stade du Moustoir; Attendance: 2,013; Referee: Ahmed Taleb |

| 13 January 2024 20 | Caen | 1-0 | Concarneau | Caen |
| 19:00 CEST (UTC+1) | 72' Mendy | Report | | Stadium: Stade Michel-d'Ornano; Attendance: 12.456; Referee: Azzédine Souifi |

| 23 January 2024 21 | Concarneau | 1–0 | Troyes | Brest |
| 20:45 CEST (UTC+1) | Urie 60' | Report | | Stadium: Stade Francis-Le Blé; Attendance: 1,184; Referee: Jérôme Brisard |

| 27 January 2024 22 | Ajaccio | 1–0 | Concarneau | Ajaccio |
| 19:00 CEST (UTC+1) | Ibayi 42' | Report | | Stadium: Stade Francois-Coty; Attendance: 3,196; Referee: Faouzi Benchabane |

| 3 February 2024 23 | Concarneau | 1–0 | Valenciennes | Lorient |
| 19:00 CEST (UTC+1) | Ba 63' | Report | | Stadium: Stade du Moustoir; Attendance: 1,789; Referee: Nicolas Rainville |

| 10 February 2024 24 | Annecy | 0–3 | Concarneau | Annecy |
| 19:00 CEST (UTC+1) | | Report | 76' Ba; 86' 87' Rodrigues | Stadium: Parc des sports Attendance: 4,008; Referee: Ahmed Taleb |

| 17 February 2024 25 | Concarneau | 2–2 | Paris | Caen |
| 19:00 CEST (UTC+1) | Ba 24'; Etuin 59' (pen.) | Report | Lopez 50'; Gory 80' | Stadium: Stade Michel-d'Ornano; Attendance: 0 Referee: Remi Landry |

| 24 February 2024 26 | Concarneau | 1–3 | Laval | Brest |
| 19:00 CEST (UTC+1) | Ba 85' | Report | Tchokounté 2'; Labeau 56'; Bobichon 82' | Stadium: Stade Francis-Le Blé; Attendance: 1,403; Referee: Faouzi Benchabane |

| 3 March 2024 27 | Dunkerque | 2–2 | Concarneau | Dunkerque |
| 19:00 CEST (UTC+1) | Anziani 18', 62' | Report | Diawara 35'; Ndombasi 90+7' | Stadium: Stade Marcel-Tribut; Attendance: 3,927; Referee: Karim Abed |

| 9 March 2024 28 | Concarneau | 2–3 | Guingamp | Brest |
| 19:00 CEST (UTC+1) | Matondo 66'; Ba 87' | Report | El Ouazzani 1' 58'; Guillaume 90+1' | Stadium: Stade Francis-Le Blé; Attendance: 3,860; Referee: Mickaël Leleu |

| 16 March 2024 29 | Pau | 2–0 | Concarneau | Pau |
| 19:00 CEST (UTC+1) | Saivet 53' (pen.); Begraoui 74' | Report | | Stadium: Nouste Camp; Attendance: 3,036; Referee: Nicolas Rainville |

| 30 March 2024 30 | Concarneau | 2–4 | Angers | Brest |
| 19:00 CEST (UTC+1) | Mouazan 9'; Rodrigues 41' | Report | Diony 50' 90'; El Melali 59'; Lepaul 78' | Stadium: Stade Francis-Le Blé; Attendance: 1,442; Referee: Pierre Legat |

| 6 April 2024 31 | Saint-Etienne | 1–0 | Concarneau | Saint-Etienne |
| 15:00 CEST (UTC+2) | Nadé 22' | Report | | Stadium: Stade Geoffroy-Guichard; Attendance: 37,337; Referee: Abdelatif Kherradji |

| 13 April 2024 32 | Concarneau | 0–0 | Amiens | Brest |
| 19:00 CEST (UTC+2) | | Report | | Stadium: Stade Francis-Le Blé; Attendance: 1,270; Referee: Benjamin Lepaysant |

| 20 April 2024 33 | Concarneau | 0–0 | Quevilly | Rennes |
| 19:00 CEST (UTC+2) | | Report | | Stadium: Roazhon Park; Attendance: 1,856; Referee: Antoine Valnet |

| 23 April 2024 34 | Bastia | 2–0 | Concarneau | Bastia |
| 20:45 CEST (UTC+2) | Santelli 52'; Charbonnier 90+4' | Report | | Stadium: Stade Armand-Cesari; Attendance: 10,371; Referee: Bastien Dechepy |

| 27 April 2024 35 | Concarneau | 1–2 | Rodez | Brest |
| 19:00 CEST (UTC+2) | Sinquin 90+4' | Report | 60' Younoussa; 69' Corredor | Stadium: Stade Francis-Le Blé; Attendance: 1,141; Referee: Aurélien Petit |

| 3 May 2024 36 | Grenoble | 2–1 | Concarneau | Grenoble |
| 20:00 CEST (UTC+2) | Benet 41' (pen.) 43' | Report | 18' (pen.) Urie | Stadium: Stade des Alpes; Attendance: 4,354; Referee: Thierry Bouille |

| 10 May 2024 37 | Concarneau | 4–2 | Bordeaux | Lorient |
| 20:45 CEST (UTC+2) | Moussiti-Oko 37'; Ba 50' 72'; Diawara 59' | Report | 9' Vipotnik; 63' Livolant | Stadium: Stade du Moustoir; Attendance: 2,334; Referee: Guillaume Paradis |

| 17 May 2024 38 | Auxerre | 4–1 | Concarneau | Auxerre |
| 20:45 CEST (UTC+2) | Onaiwu 40' 64' 80'; Hein 85' | Report | 21' Moussiti-Oko | Stadium: Stade de l'Abbé-Deschamps; Attendance: 17,101; Referee: Nicolas Rainville |

=== Coupe de France ===
| 18 November 2023 Seventh round | Saint-Brieuc | 3–3 (5–3 p) | Concarneau | Saint-Brieuc |
| 19:00 CEST (UTC+1) | Martin 51', 64'; Le Marer 90+3' | Report | Mouazan 62'; Jannez 85'; Chadli 90+8' | Stadium: Stade Fred-Aubert; Attendance: 1,241; Referee: Benjamin Lepaysant |
