= Alec Georgen =

French footballer (born 1998)

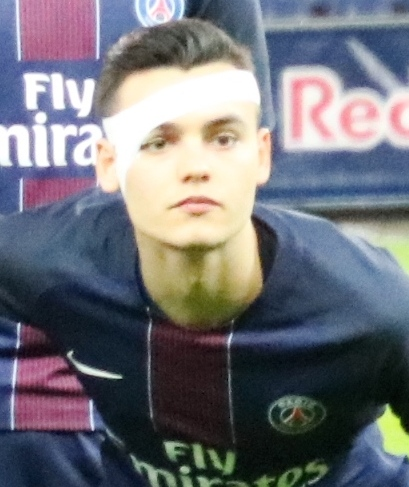
- Georgen with Paris Saint-Germain U19 in 2017

Personal information
- Full name: Alec Mathieu Georgen
- Date of birth: 17 September 1998 (age 28)
- Place of birth: Clamart, France
- Height: 1.72 m (5 ft 8 in)
- Position: Right-back

Team information
- Current team: Lorient

Youth career
- 2004–2007: CSM Clamart
- 2007–2011: Clamart FC
- 2011–2016: Paris Saint-Germain

Senior career*
Years	Team	Apps	(Gls)
2015–2019	Paris Saint-Germain B	42	(3)
2017–2018	Paris Saint-Germain	0	(0)
2018	→ Jong AZ (loan)	4	(0)
2019–2020	Avranches	11	(1)
2019–2020	Avranches B	3	(0)
2020–2023	Auxerre	8	(0)
2022–2023	→ Concarneau (loan)	31	(2)
2023–2024	Concarneau	34	(0)
2024–2026	Dunkerque	64	(0)
2026–	Lorient	0	(0)

International career
2014	France U16	4	(0)
2014–2015	France U17	14	(0)
2015–2016	France U18	7	(1)
2016–2017	France U19	7	(0)
Medal record
Representing France
UEFA European Under-17 Championship
Winner	2015 Bulgaria
- * Club domestic league appearances and goals as of 11 May 2026

Alec Mathieu Georgen (born 17 September 1998) is a French professional footballer who plays as a right-back for Ligue 1 club Lorient.

== Club career ==
Georgen signed a three-year professional contract with Paris Saint-Germain (PSG) in July 2015. He made his professional debut on 24 January 2017, in the Coupe de la Ligue semi-final against Bordeaux. He replaced Lucas Moura after 88 minutes, in a 4–1 away win.

In January 2018, Georgen was loaned to AZ for the remainder of the 2017–18 season. He would play four matches for Jong AZ before returning to PSG.

In September 2019, Georgen left PSG to join Championnat National club Avranches.

On 3 June 2020, Georgen signed for Ligue 2 side Auxerre. He put pen to paper for a three-year contract with the club. Georgen made his debut for Auxerre in a 2–0 home loss to Sochaux on 22 August 2020. His first Coupe de France match came on 19 January 2021, as his team was victorious 1–0 over Troyes.

On 22 August 2022, Georgen was loaned out to Championnat National club Concarneau. He would go on to win the league with the team.

On 4 July 2024, Georgen signed for Ligue 2 club Dunkerque on a two-year contract.

On 30 June 2026, Georgen signed a three-year contract with Lorient in Ligue 1.

== Career statistics ==
As of match played 17 May 2025

Appearances and goals by club, season and competition
Club	Season	League			Cup		Other		Total	
Club	Season	Division	Apps	Goals	Apps	Goals	Apps	Goals	Apps	Goals
Paris Saint-Germain B	2015–16	CFA	9	0	—		—		9	0
Paris Saint-Germain B	2016–17	CFA	22	2	—		—		22	2
Paris Saint-Germain B	2017–18	National 2	10	1	—		—		10	1
Paris Saint-Germain B	2018–19	National 2	1	0	—		—		1	0
Paris Saint-Germain B	Total		42	3	—		—		42	3
Paris Saint-Germain	2016–17	Ligue 1	0	0	0	0	1 (Note: Appearance in the Coupe de la Ligue)	0	1	0
Jong AZ (loan)	2017–18	Eerste Divisie	4	0	—		—		4	0
Avranches	2019–20	National	11	1	0	0	0	0	11	1
Avranches B	2019–20	National 3	3	0	—		—		3	0
Auxerre	2020–21	Ligue 2	1	0	2	0	—		3	0
Auxerre	2021–22	Ligue 2	7	0	2	0	0	0	9	0
Auxerre	Total		8	0	4	0	0	0	12	0
Concarneau (loan)	2022–23	National	31	2	0	0	—		31	2
Concarneau	2023–24	Ligue 2	34	0	1	0	—		35	0
Dunkerque	2024–25	Ligue 2	33	0	5	0	2 (Note: Appearances in the Ligue 2 promotion play-offs)	0	40	0
Career total			166	6	10	0	3	0	179	6

== Honours ==
Paris Saint-Germain U19

- Championnat National U19: 2015–16
- UEFA Youth League runner-up: 2015–16

Paris Saint-Germain

- Coupe de la Ligue: 2016–17

Concarneau

- Championnat National: 2022–23

France U17

- UEFA European Under-17 Championship: 2015

Individual

- UEFA European Under-17 Championship: 2015 Team of the Tournament
