= Clément Rodrigues =

French footballer (born 2000)

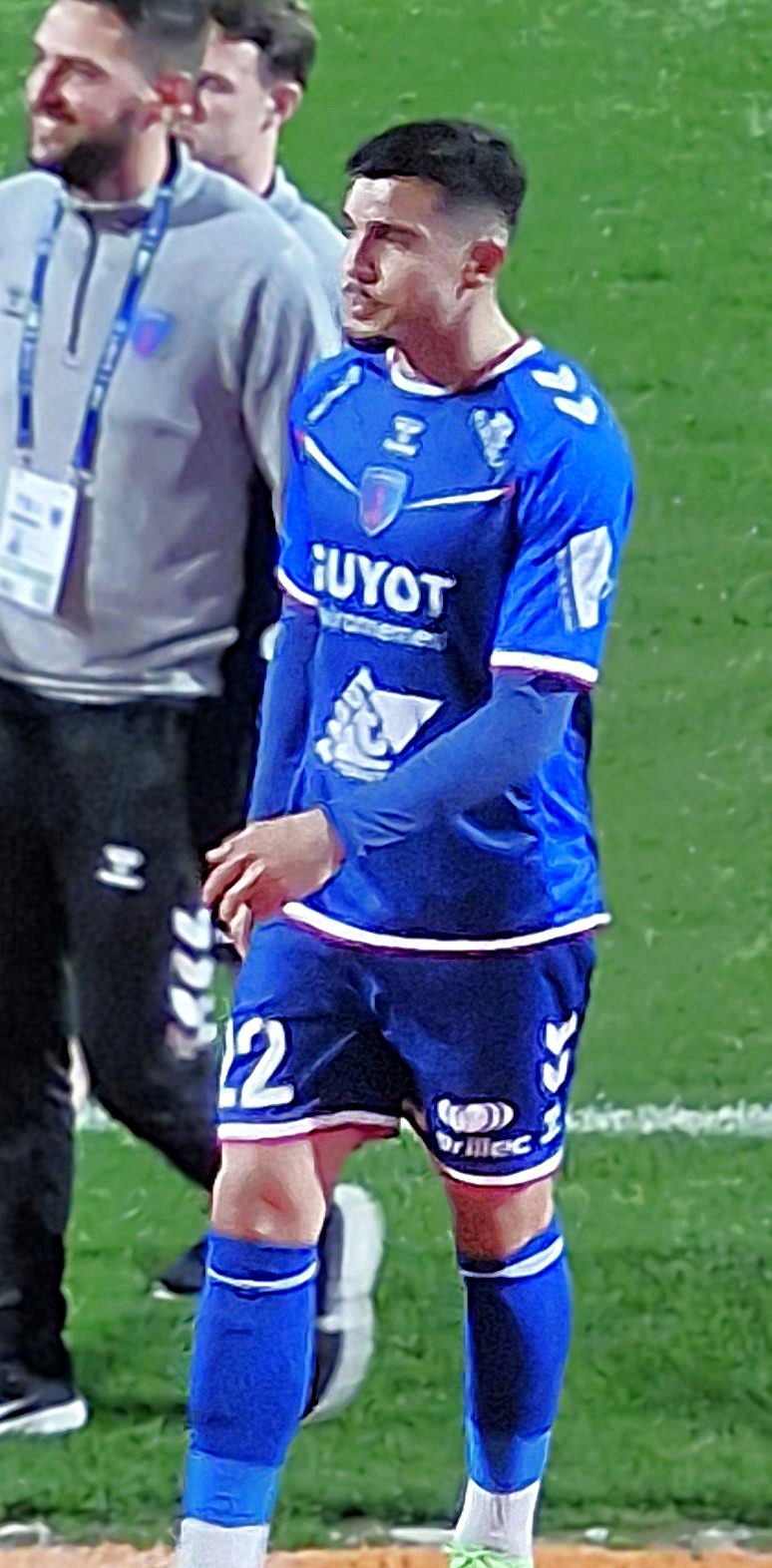
- Rodrigues with Concarneau in 2024

Personal information
- Date of birth: 4 December 2000 (age 25)
- Place of birth: L'Isle-d'Espagnac, France
- Height: 1.84 m (6 ft 0 in)
- Position: Forward

Team information
- Current team: Bastia

Youth career
- Chasseneuil
- –2019: Angoulême

Senior career*
Years	Team	Apps	(Gls)
2019–2021	Angoulême	5	(0)
2021–2022	Deux Mers		
2022–2023	Bassin d'Arcachon		
2023–2024	Concarneau	26	(4)
2024–	Bastia	17	(3)
2025	→ Barnsley (loan)	6	(0)
2025	→ Orléans (loan)	6	(0)
2025–2026	→ Le Puy (loan)	25	(8)
- * Club domestic league appearances and goals as of 23 June 2026

Clément Rodrigues (born 4 December 2000) is a French professional footballer who plays as a forward for Ligue 3 club Bastia.

Rodrigues began his senior club with Angoulême, before leaving for amateur club Deux Mers. After helping the club get promoted to the National 3 in his only season with them, he left for Bassin d'Arcachon in 2022. He scored 12 goals with the Regional 1 side before moving to National club Concarneau in 2023. He left for Bastia in 2024. Rodrigues was loaned to EFL League One club Barnsley in 2025. After making 6 appearances without scoring for Barnsley, he returned to Bastia. He was subsequently loaned to National club Orléans in the summer of 2025.

== Career ==
=== Early career ===
Rodrigues began with his local club, Chasseneuil, before leaving for National 2 club Angoulême. He progressed up Angoulême's youth teams before being promoted to the senior team, where he made five appearances. In 2021, Rodrigues left for Régional 1 Nouvelle-Aquitaine team Deux Mers. He scored 13 goals in his only season and helped the club get promoted to National 3. However, he returned to the Regional 1 with Bassin d'Arcachon, due to the instability of Deux Mers. He scored 12 goals in the league, which attracted attention from National club Concarneau.

=== Concarneau ===
Concarneau coach Stéphane Le Mignan invited Rodrigues to a one week trial in December, which helped Rodrigues secure a six month contract with an option to extend a year. He made his debut on 16 January 2023, in a 3–2 defeat against Bourg-Péronnas. Rodrigues made 4 appearances over the course of the season, scoring a goal on 6 February against Le Mans. Following Concarneau's promotion to Ligue 2, Rodrigues was given a professional contract. His Ligue 2 debut came on 5 August 2024, in a 0–0 draw against Bastia. His first start came on 14 August, in a 1–0 loss against Bordeaux. A few days following his grandfather's death, he scr lred his first Ligue 2 goals on 2 February 2024, in a 3–0 win against Annecy. He ended the season with 22 appearances and 3 goals. However, Concarneau was relegated at the end of the season.

=== Bastia ===
Following Concarneau's relegation, Rodrigues secured a four-year contract with SC Bastia, remaining in Ligue 2. The signing was announced on June 19, 2024. He made his Bastia debut on 19 August in a 1–1 draw against Metz. His first start came on 23 August in a 1–0 victory against Amiens. His first goal came on 30 August, where he scored the winner in a 1–0 victory against Martigues.

==== Loan to Barnsley ====
On 3 February 2025, Rodrigues joined EFL League One club Barnsley on loan for the remainder of the season with the option to buy. He made his debut on 8 February in a 2–1 loss against Stockport County, being subbed off at half-time. He returned to Bastia at the end of the season, having made 6 league appearances without scoring.

==== Loan to Orléans ====
In the summer of 2025, Rodrigues was loaned to National club Orléans on loan for the 2025–26 season.

==== Loan to Le Puy ====
On 24 September 2025, Rodrigues had his loan with Orléans terminated by mutual consent, joining Le Puy on loan for the remainder of the season.

== Career statistics ==
=== Club ===
As of 1 April 2025

Appearances and goals by club, season and competition
Club	Season	League			Cup		Total	
Club	Season	Division	Apps	Goals	Apps	Goals	Apps	Goals
Angoulême	2019–20	Championnat National 3	3	0	0	0	3	0
Angoulême	2020–21	Championnat National 2	2	0	0	0	2	0
Angoulême	Total		5	0	0	0	5	0
Deux Mers	2021–22	Régional 1	—		—		—	
Bassin d'Arcachon	2022–23	Régional 1	—		—		—	
Concarneau	2022–23	Championnat National	4	1	0	0	4	1
Concarneau	2023–24	Ligue 2	22	3	1	0	23	3
Concarneau	Total		26	4	0	0	27	4
Bastia	2024–25	Ligue 2	17	3	3	1	17	4
Barnsley	2024–25	League One	6	0	0	0	6	0
Career total			54	7	4	1	58	8

== Honours ==
US Concarneau

- National: 2022-23
