= Maxime Pattier =

French footballer (born 1996)

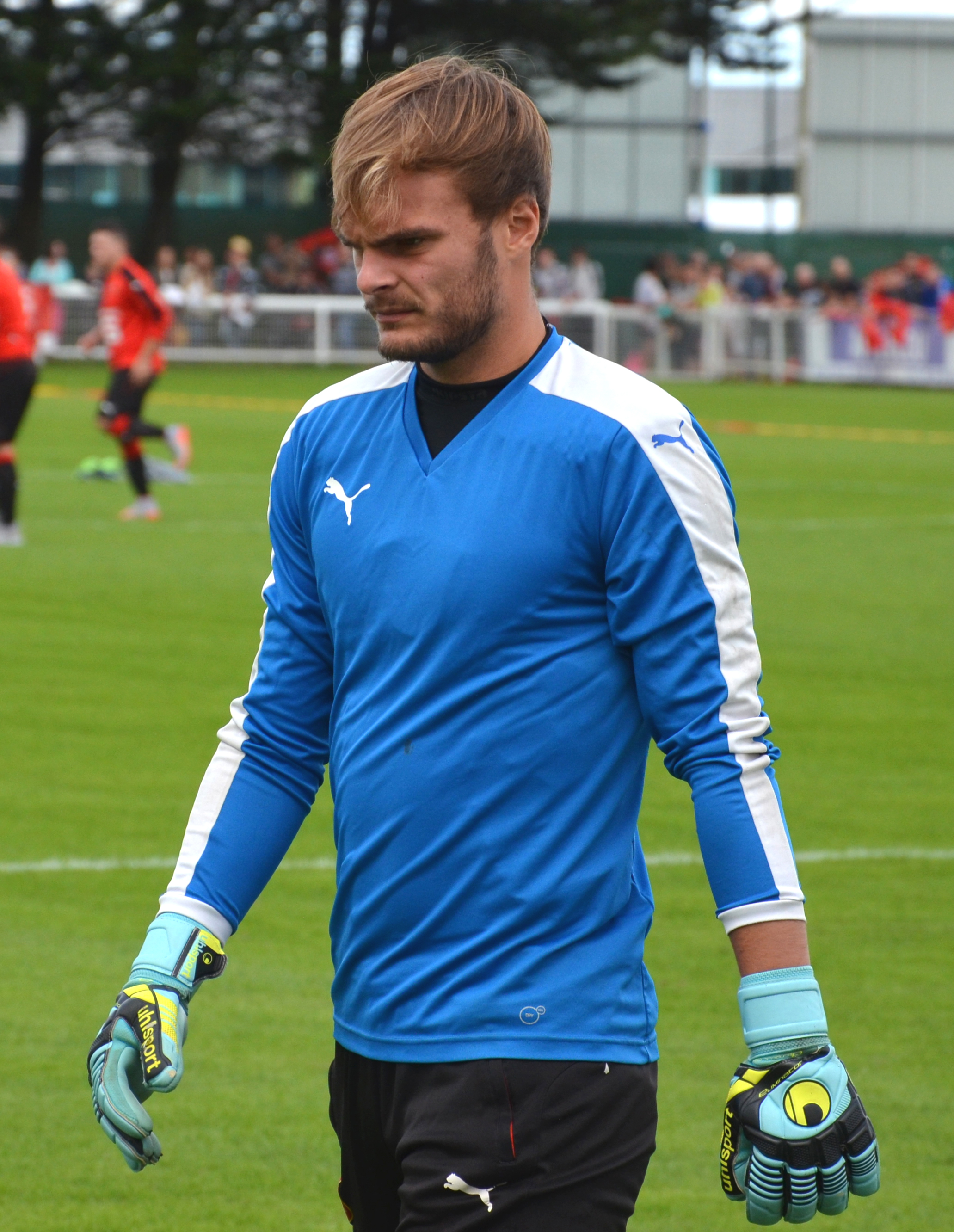
- Pattier training with Rennes in September 2015

Personal information
- Date of birth: 12 February 1996 (age 30)
- Place of birth: Vitré, France
- Height: 1.84 m (6 ft 0 in)
- Position: Goalkeeper

Team information
- Current team: Saint-Malo

Youth career
- 2002–2006: Etrellaise
- 2006–2014: Rennes

Senior career*
Years	Team	Apps	(Gls)
2014–2015	Rennes B	28	(0)
2015–2021	Lorient B	30	(0)
2020–2021	→ Stade Briochin (loan)	34	(0)
2021–2022	Stade Briochin	34	(0)
2022–2024	Concarneau	34	(0)
2024–2026	Grenoble	1	(0)
2026–	Saint-Malo	0	(0)
- * Club domestic league appearances and goals as of 9 May 2026

Maxime Pattier (born 12 February 1996) is a French professional footballer who plays as a goalkeeper for Championnat National 1 club Saint-Malo.

== Career ==
On 6 February 2019, Pattier signed his first professional contract with Lorient. He made his professional debut for Lorient in a 2–1 Coupe de la Ligue loss to Le Mans on 13 August 2019.

In June 2020, Pattier joined Stade Briochin, newly promoted to Championnat National.

In June 2022, Pattier signed a two-year contract with Concarneau.

== Honours ==
Concarneau

- Championnat National: 2022–23
