= Viot =

Viot (English: /viːˈoʊ/, French: [vjo]) is a surname. Notable people with the surname include:

- Adrien Viot (born 1985), French photographer and musician
- Bernard Viot (1937–2022), French racing cyclist
- Jacques Viot (1898–1973), French novelist and screenwriter
- Jacques Viot (1921–2012), French academic and diplomat
- Patrick Viot (1952–2021), French footballer
- Pierre Viot (1925–2020), French executive
- Vincent Viot (born 1994), French football goalkeeper

== See also ==
- Vicot (surname)

== Other uses ==
- 13251 Viot
- Fleming–Viot process
