= Juan Guevara (footballer) =

Colombian footballer

Personal information
- Full name: Juan José Guevara Possu
- Date of birth: 26 June 2001 (age 25)
- Place of birth: Cali, Colombia
- Height: 1.86 m (6 ft 1 in)
- Position: Centre-back

Team information
- Current team: León
- Number: 3

Youth career
- Millonarios
- 2021–2023: Fortaleza

Senior career*
Years	Team	Apps	(Gls)
2023–2026	Fortaleza	24	(0)
2024–2026	→ Bastia (loan)	42	(1)
2026	Bastia	0	(0)
2026–	León	11	(0)
- * Club domestic league appearances and goals as of 17 October 2026

Juan José Guevara Possu (born 26 June 2001) is a Colombian professional footballer who plays as a centre-back for Liga MX club León.

== Club career ==
=== Fortaleza ===
After spending time in the Millonarios youth setup, Guevara joined Fortaleza on a free transfer. He helped Fortaleza to promotion to the Liga DIMAYOR in the 2023 season.

=== Bastia ===
On 31 July, Guevara signed for Ligue 2 club Bastia on loan. On 7 March 2025, he was substited at half-time in a game against Martigues with a patellar tendon injury. After having an operation in April, his loan was extended for another year on 19 June. On 10 January 2026, he was sent off as Bastia were eliminated from the Coupe de France in the round of 16, losing 2–0 to Troyes. On 11 April, he scored the first goal of his career in a 4–3 defeat to Red Star. Bastia exercised his purchase option on 16 June, signing him to a 3-year contract.

=== León ===
Amid Bastia's financial problems and relegation to Ligue 3, on 24 June 2026, Guevara signed for Liga MX club León for $3 million. On 18 July, he made his debut in a 3–2 defeat to Atlas. He scored his first goal for the club in the Leagues Cup on 8 August in a 2–1 win over Orlando City. He quickly established himself as a key starter in the team.

== Career statistics ==
As of match played on 17 October 2026

Appearances and goals by club, season and competition
Club	Season	League			Cup (Note: Includes Coupe de France)		Continental		Other		Total	
Club	Season	Division	Apps	Goals	Apps	Goals	Apps	Goals	Apps	Goals	Apps	Goals
Fortaleza	2023	Categoría Primera B	9	0	—		—		—		9	0
Fortaleza	2024	Liga DIMAYOR	15	0	—		—		—		15	0
Fortaleza	Total		24	0	0	0	0	0	0	0	24	0
SC Bastia (loan)	2024–25	Ligue 2	16	0	—		—		—		16	0
SC Bastia (loan)	2025–26	Ligue 2	26	1	2	0	—		—		28	1
SC Bastia (loan)	Total		42	1	2	0	0	0	0	0	44	1
León	2026–27	Liga MX	11	0	—		—		6 (Note: Appearances in Leagues Cup)	1	17	1
Career total			77	1	2	0	0	0	6	1	85	2
