= Guillaume Jannez =

French footballer (born 1989)

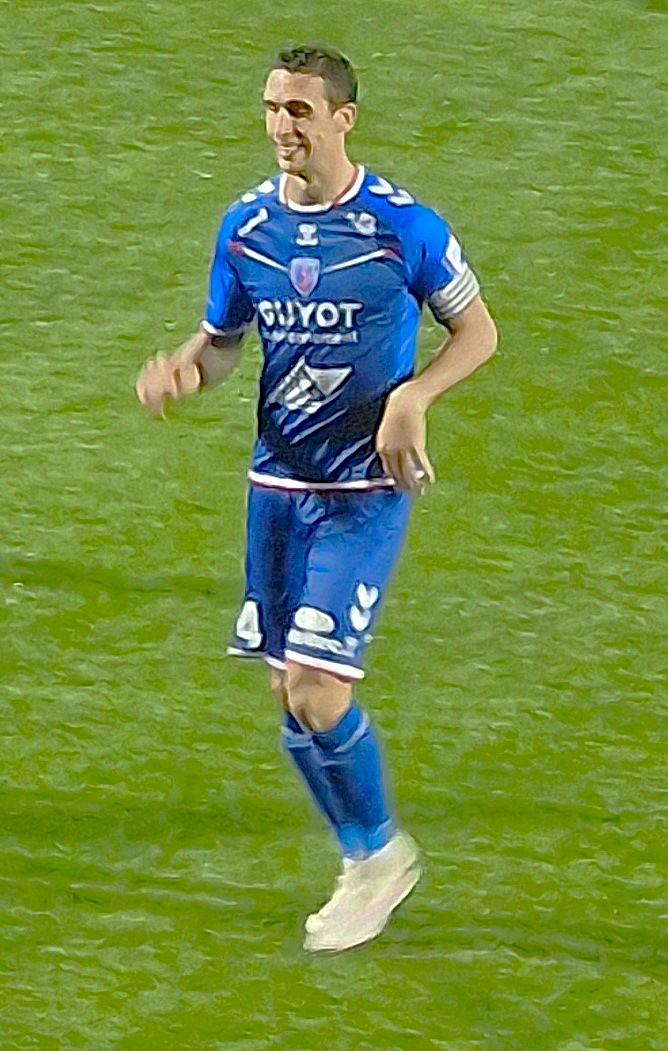
- Jannez in 2024

Personal information
- Date of birth: 19 February 1989 (age 37)
- Place of birth: Concarneau, France
- Height: 1.96 m (6 ft 5 in)
- Position: Centre-back

Team information
- Current team: Saint-Colomban Locminé

Youth career
- 1996–2003: AS Baye
- 2003–2006: Lorient

Senior career*
Years	Team	Apps	(Gls)
2006–2007	FC Quimperlé		
2007–2026	Concarneau	455	(17)
2026–	Saint-Colomban Locminé	0	(0)
- * Club domestic league appearances and goals as of 23 June 2026

Guillaume Jannez (born 19 February 1989) is a French footballer who plays as a centre-back for Championnat National 1 club Saint-Colomban Locminé.

== Early life ==
Jannez was born and raised in Concarneau, and his brother and father played football. His mother played basketball, and Jannez played that sport at a high level before deciding to pursue a career in football.

== Professional career ==
Jannez began playing football with the youth sides of AS Baye at the age of 6. He then moved to Lorient where he played for 3 seasons, before moving to Quimperlé. He began his senior career with FC Quimperlé in 2006, and in 2007 transferred to Concarneau who were at the Championnat National 2 at the age of 18. Originally alternating between the senior team and the reserves, Jannez became a stalwart with the club. At the age of 20, he shifted from midfielder to centre-back and was named captain of the club by his then manager Nicolas Cloarec. He captained Concarneau as they won the 2022–23 Championnat National and earned promotion to the Ligue 2 for the first time in their history. On 24 June 2023, he signed his first professional contract with the club until 2024. At the age of 34, Jannez made his professional debut with Concarneau, a 0–0 Ligue 2 tie with Bastia on 5 August 2023.

== Personal life ==
Jannez is married and has 2 sons. His wife and kids were also all born in Concarneau.

== Honours ==
Concarneau

- Championnat National: 2022–23
