= Loïc Goujon =

French footballer (born 1996)

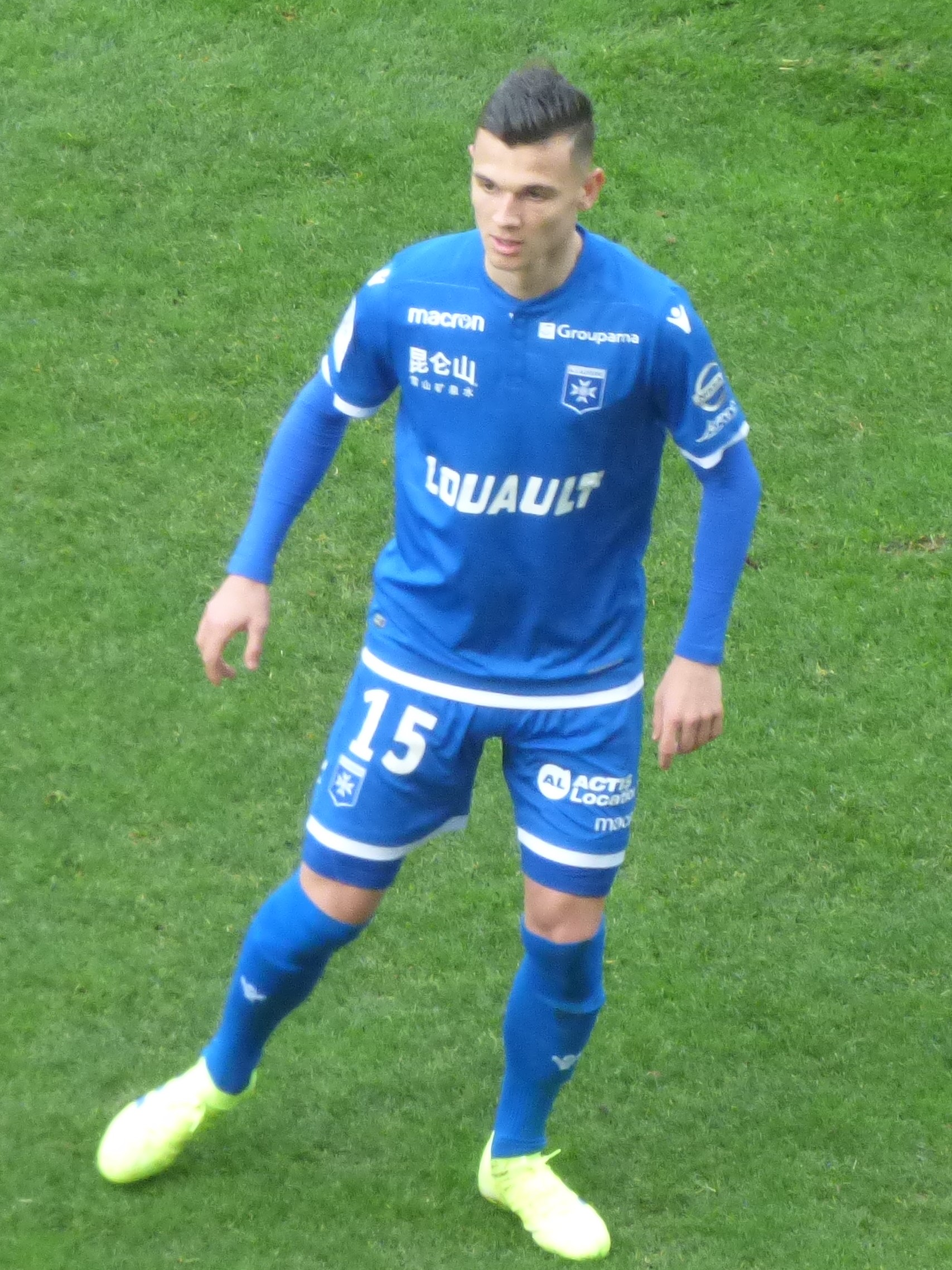
- Goujon with Auxerre in 2019

Personal information
- Date of birth: 9 January 1996 (age 30)
- Place of birth: Sens, France
- Height: 1.80 m (5 ft 11 in)
- Position: Midfielder

Team information
- Current team: Concarneau
- Number: 23

Youth career
- Sens

Senior career*
Years	Team	Apps	(Gls)
2014–2019	Auxerre B	59	(0)
2016–2019	Auxerre	49	(0)
2017–2018	→ Boulogne (loan)	20	(1)
2019–2020	Red Star	22	(0)
2020–2025	Orléans	144	(7)
2025–	Concarneau	25	(1)
- * Club domestic league appearances and goals as of 23 June 2026

Loïc Goujon (born 9 January 1996) is a French professional footballer who plays for Ligue 3 club Concarneau as a midfielder.

== Career ==
As a child, Goujon played for his home city club, FC Sens. When he moved to college, he was spotted at a tournament by AJ Auxerre and joined their B team in 2014, aged 18. He made his Ligue 2 debut for the first team as a late substitute in a 0–0 draw at Red Star, the first game of the 2016–17, on 30 July 2016. He made his full debut on 12 August 2016 in a 4–2 win at Bourg-en-Bresse. On 14 December 2016, after becoming a regular in the first team, he signed his first professional contract with the club.

In October 2017, Goujon was loaned to Boulogne in the Championnat National. He scored his first senior league goal whilst at the club, on 16 February 2018 in a 2–1 win over Chambly. After the loan he returned to Auxerre, where he was a part of the first team squad for the 2018–19 Ligue 2 season. At the end of the season, he was not successful in negotiating a contract extension, and left Auxerre.

On 16 July 2019, Goujon signed for Red Star.

He moved to Ligue 2 side US Orléans in June 2020.
