= 2024–25 SC Bastia season =

SC Bastia
2024–25 season
- Manager: Benoît Tavenot
- Stadium: Stade Armand-Cesari
- Ligue 2: 8th
- Coupe de France: Round of 32
- Top goalscorer: League: Lamine Cissé (9); All: Lamine Cissé (11)
- Biggest win: Bastia 5–0 RC Saint Joseph
Home colours	Away colours

The 2024–25 season was the 120th season in the history of SC Bastia, and their fourth consecutive season in Ligue 2. In addition to the domestic league, the club competed in the Coupe de France.

== Transfers ==
=== In ===
Pos.	Player	Transferred from	Fee	Date	Source
FW	(France) Amine Boutrah	(Netherlands) Vitesse	Free	1 July 2024	
FW	(France) Lamine Cissé	(France) Nancy	Free	1 July 2024	
GK	(France) Anthony Maisonnial	(France) Andrézieux-Bouthéon FC	Free	1 July 2024	
DF	(France) Zakaria Ariss	(France) Dijon		30 July 2024	
DF	(Colombia) Juan Guevara	(Colombia) Fortaleza CEIF	Loan	31 July 2024	
MF	(France) Lisandru Tramoni	(Italy) Pisa SC	Loan	6 August 2024	
MF	(France) Noa Donat	(France) FC Lorient	Free	26 August 2024	
MF	(France) Yahya Bathily	(France) US Feurs	Free	26 August 2024	

=== Out ===
Pos.	Player	Transferred to	Fee	Date	Source
FW	(France) Gaëtan Charbonnier	(France) Pouzauges Bocage FC	Contract terminated	1 July 2024	
DF	(Morocco) Mohamed Souboul	(United Arab Emirates) Ajman	Contract terminated	1 July 2024	
DF	(Mali) Issiar Dramé	(Portugal) Estrela da Amadora	Undisclosed	6 July 2024	
FW	(France) Benjamin Santelli	(France) Ajaccio	Contract terminated	12 July 2024	
FW	(France) Migouel Alfarela	(Poland) Legia Warsaw	€1M	24 July 2024	
DF	(France) Yllan Okou	(Italy) Hellas Verona	Loan	29 July 2024	
MF	(France) Florian Bianchini	(Wales) Swansea City	Undisclosed	23 August 2024	

== Pre-season and friendlies ==
23 July 2024 Friendly	Bastia	1–2	Balagne FC
18:10

27 July 2024 Friendly	Rodez AF	2–1	Bastia
18:00

31 July 2024 Friendly	Bastia	3–1	Annecy
18:30

3 August 2024 Friendly	Ajaccio	1–2	Bastia
18:00

10 August 2024 Friendly	Angers	1–2	Bastia
17:00

11 October 2024 Friendly	Martigues	1–1	Bastia
17:00

== Competitions ==
=== Overall record ===
Competition	First match	Last match	Starting round	Record							
Competition	First match	Last match	Starting round	Pld	W	D	L	GF	GA	GD	Win %
Ligue 2	19 August 2024	10 May 2025	Matchday 1	16	4	10	2	16	14	+2	25.00
Coupe de France	16 November 2024			3	3	0	0	11	0	+11	100.00
Total				19	7	10	2	27	14	+13	36.84

Last updated: 20 December 2024
Source: Competitions

=== Ligue 2 ===
==== League table ====
Pos	Team	Pld	W	D	L	GF	GA	GD	Pts
6	Annecy	34	14	9	11	42	42	0	51
7	Laval	34	14	8	12	44	38	+6	50
8	Bastia	34	11	15	8	43	37	+6	48
9	Grenoble	34	13	7	14	43	44	−1	46
10	Troyes	34	13	5	16	36	34	+2	44

Source: Ligue 2
Rules for classification: 1) Points; 2) Goal difference; 3) Number of goals scored; 4) Head-to-head goal difference; 5) Fair play points

==== Results summary ====
Overall								Home						Away					
Pld	W	D	L	GF	GA	GD	Pts	W	D	L	GF	GA	GD	W	D	L	GF	GA	GD
16	4	10	2	16	14	+2	22	3	5	0	10	6	+4	1	5	2	6	8	−2

Last updated: 13 December 2024.

==== Results by round ====
Round	1	2	3	4	5	6	7	8	9	10	11	12	13	14	15	16	17
Ground	A	H	A	H	H	A	H	A	H	A	H	A	A	H	A	H	A
Result	D	W	W	D	W	L	D	D	D	D	D	L	D	D	D	W	
Position																	

Updated to match(es) played on 13 December 2024. Source:
A = Away; H = Home; W = Win; D = Draw; L = Loss

==== Matches ====
The league schedule was released on 21 June 2024.

19 August 2024 1	Metz	1–1	Bastia	Metz

23 August 2024 2	Bastia	1–0	Amiens	Furiani
				Stadium: Stade Armand-Cesari

30 August 2024 3	Martigues	0–1	Bastia	Martigues

13 September 2024 4	Bastia	0–0	Troyes	Furiani
				Stadium: Stade Armand-Cesari

20 September 2024 5	Bastia	2–1	Paris FC	Furiani
				Stadium: Stade Armand-Cesari

24 September 2024 6	Dunkerque	2–1	Bastia	Dunkirk

27 September 2024 7	Bastia	2–2	Annecy	Furiani
				Stadium: Stade Armand-Cesari

18 October 2024 9	Bastia	0–0	Clermont	Furiani
				Stadium: Stade Armand-Cesari

22 October 2024 8	Pau	1–1	Bastia	Pau

29 October 2024 11	Bastia	2–2	Rodez	Furiani
				Stadium: Stade Armand-Cesari

2 November 2024 12	Caen	2–0	Bastia	Caen

8 November 2024 13	Laval	2–2	Bastia	Laval

23 November 2024 14	Bastia	0–0	Lorient	Furiani
				Stadium: Stade Armand-Cesari

3 December 2024 10	Ajaccio	0–0	Bastia	Ajaccio

6 December 2024 15	Red Star	0–0	Bastia	Saint-Ouen-sur-Seine
				Stadium: Stade Bauer

13 December 2024 16	Bastia	3–1	Guingamp	Furiani
				Stadium: Stade Armand-Cesari

3 January 2025 17	Grenoble	v	Bastia	Grenoble
20:00				Stadium: Stade des Alpes

=== Coupe de France ===
16 November 2024 Seventh round	Freyming	0–4	Bastia	Forbach
14:00				Stadium: Stade du Schlossberg

29 November 2024 Eighth round	Bastia	2–0	Nancy	Furiani
				Stadium: Stade Armand-Cesari

20 December 2024 Round of 64	Bastia	5–0	(Martinique) RC Saint Joseph	Furiani
20:45	Tramoni 24'; Rodrigues 25'; Guidi 30'; Boutrah 45+1'; Tomi 75'			Stadium: Stade Armand-Cesari

14 January 2025 Round of 32	Bastia	v	Nice	Furiani
20:45				Stadium: Stade Armand-Cesari
