= Nicolas Mercier =

French footballer (born 2003)

Personal information
- Date of birth: 30 January 2003 (age 23)
- Place of birth: Paris, France
- Height: 1.74 m (5 ft 9 in)
- Position: Winger

Team information
- Current team: Concarneau
- Number: 11

Youth career
- 2012–2014: CS Cellois
- 2014–2018: Versailles
- 2018–2020: Auxerre

Senior career*
Years	Team	Apps	(Gls)
2019–2024	Auxerre II	29	(3)
2021–2025	Auxerre	4	(0)
2022–2023	→ Avranches (loan)	32	(2)
2023–2024	→ Deinze (loan)	9	(1)
2024–2025	→ Paris 13 Atletico (loan)	19	(0)
2025–	Concarneau	9	(0)

International career
2018–2019	France U16	7	(0)
2019	France U17	2	(0)
2022	France U20	1	(0)
- * Club domestic league appearances and goals as of 5 December 2025

Nicolas Mercier (born 30 January 2003) is a French professional footballer who plays as a winger for Ligue 3 club Concarneau.

== Club career ==
A former youth academy player of Versailles, Mercier joined Auxerre in 2018. On 2 October 2020, he signed his first professional contract with the club. He made his professional debut for the club on 2 August 2021 in a 3–0 league win against Grenoble.

On 28 July 2022, Mercier was loaned to Avranches.

On 26 September 2024, Mercier was loaned to Paris 13 Atletico.

== International career ==
Mercier is a French youth international. He has appeared in friendlies for under-16 and under-17 teams.

== Career statistics ==
=== Club ===
As of 2 August 2021

Appearances and goals by club, season and competition
Club	Season	League			Cup		Continental		Total	
Club	Season	Division	Apps	Goals	Apps	Goals	Apps	Goals	Apps	Goals
Auxerre II	2019–20	Championnat National 3	2	0	—		—		2	0
Auxerre II	2020–21	Championnat National 2	8	3	—		—		8	3
Auxerre II	Total		10	3	0	0	0	0	10	3
Auxerre	2021–22	Ligue 2	1	0	0	0	—		1	0
Career total			11	3	0	0	0	0	11	3
