= Baptiste Etcheverria =

French professional footballer (born 1997)

Personal information
- Date of birth: 9 April 1997 (age 29)
- Place of birth: Cambo-les-Bains, France
- Height: 1.77 m (5 ft 10 in)
- Position: Right-back

Team information
- Current team: Concarneau
- Number: 5

Youth career
- 2001–2009: Kanboko Izarra
- 2009–2011: Genêts Anglet
- 2011–2012: Real Unión
- 2012–2015: Bayonne

Senior career*
Years	Team	Apps	(Gls)
2015–2016	Bayonne	2	(0)
2016–2019	Tours B	32	(2)
2017–2019	Tours	29	(1)
2019	Guingamp B	4	(0)
2020–2021	Toulon	17	(0)
2021–2022	Laval	26	(0)
2021–2022	Laval B	3	(1)
2022–2023	Nancy	27	(4)
2023–2024	Bourges Foot 18	15	(1)
2024–	Concarneau	61	(1)
- * Club domestic league appearances and goals as of 23 June 2026

Baptiste Etcheverria (born 9 April 1997) is a French professional footballer who plays as a right-back for Ligue 3 club Concarneau.

== Career ==
Etcheverria was born in the Basque region of France, and spent his formative playing for various Basque teams in France and Spain. He signed his first professional contract with Tours FC on 23 July 2017. He made his professional debut with Tours in a 1–1 Ligue 2 tie with Nîmes Olympique on 10 February 2017.

On 17 June 2021, Etcheverria moved to Laval.

On 9 July 2022, Etcheverria signed with Nancy for two years with an option for a third year.

== Honours ==
Laval

- Championnat National: 2021–22
