= Vicot (surname) =

Vicot (English: /vɪˈkoʊ/, French: [viko]) is a French surname.

== People with the surname ==
- Robert Vicot (1931–2026), French footballer
- Roger Vicot (born 1963), French politician

== See also ==
- Viot
