= Axel Urie =

Footballer (born 1999)

Personal information
- Full name: Axel Paul Urie
- Date of birth: 14 April 1999 (age 27)
- Place of birth: Nîmes, France
- Height: 1.80 m (5 ft 11 in)
- Position: Winger

Team information
- Current team: Radnik Surdulica
- Number: 7

Senior career*
| Years | Team | Apps | (Gls) |
| 2017–2019 | Nîmes B | 35 | (3) |
| 2019–2021 | Guingamp B | 21 | (2) |
| 2021–2022 | Créteil | 18 | (2) |
| 2022–2024 | Concarneau | 57 | (2) |
| 2024–2025 | Al Kharaitiyat | 13 | (1) |
| 2025–2026 | Sarıyer | 16 | (1) |
| 2026– | Radnik Surdulica | 3 | (0) |

International career^{‡}
| 2021– | Central African Republic | 9 | (0) |
- * Club domestic league appearances and goals as of 12 June 2026 ‡ National team caps and goals as of 12 June 2026

Axel Paul Urie (born 14 April 1999) is a professional footballer who plays as a winger for Serbian SuperLiga club Radnik Surdulica. Born in France, he plays for the Central African Republic national team.

== Club career ==
Urie began his senior career with the reserves of Nîmes and Guingamp. He made his professional debut with Guingamp in a 3–0 Coupe de France loss to FC Lorient on 16 October 2019. On 19 July 2021, he transferred to Creteil in the Championnat National.

== International career ==
Born in Nimes, in the south of France, Urie is Central African by descent. He made his debut with the Central African Republic national team in a 1–1 2022 FIFA World Cup qualification tie with Cape Verde on 1 September 2021.
