= Alexandre Phliponeau =

French footballer (born 2000)

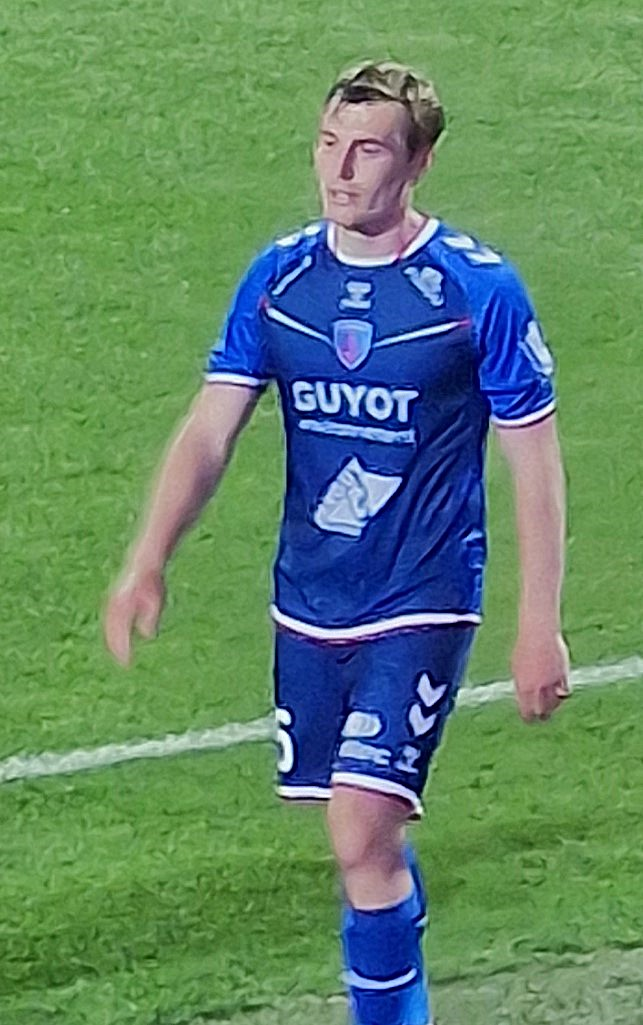
- Phliponeau in 2024

Personal information
- Date of birth: 26 January 2000 (age 26)
- Place of birth: Marseille, France
- Height: 1.80 m (5 ft 11 in)
- Position: Defensive midfielder

Team information
- Current team: Troyes
- Number: 26

Youth career
- 2011–2017: Marseille

Senior career*
Years	Team	Apps	(Gls)
2017–2022	Marseille B	63	(0)
2021–2022	→ Sète (loan)	27	(1)
2022–2023	Annecy	11	(0)
2023–2024	Concarneau	33	(0)
2025–	Troyes	22	(0)

International career
2018	France U18	3	(0)
2018–2019	France U19	5	(0)
- * Club domestic league appearances and goals as of 11 May 2026

Alexandre Phliponeau (born 26 January 2000) is a French professional footballer who plays as a defensive midfielder for Ligue 1 club Troyes.

== Career ==
Phliponeau is a product of the youth academy of Marseille, having joined in 2011. He was promoted to their reserves in 2017 and signed his first professional contract with them on 26 April 2019, signing on for 3 years. He became the record appearance holder for Marseille II with 63 caps when he left in 2021. He joined Sète on loan for the 2021-22 season in the Championnat National where he made 27 appearances. He transferred to the newly promoted club Annecy in the Ligue 2 on 8 June 2022. He debuted with Annecy in a 2–1 loss in the Ligue 2 to Niort on 30 July 2022.

On 5 August 2023, Phliponeau officially joined Ligue 2 club Concarneau. He made his debut later in the day in a 0–0 draw against Bastia.

On 3 January 2025, Phliponeau signed for Ligue 2 club Troyes.

== International career ==
Phliponeau is a youth international for France, having represented the France U18s and France U19s.
