= Lucas Rosier =

French footballer (born 2007)

Personal information
- Full name: Lucas Rosier
- Date of birth: 12 March 2007 (age 19)
- Place of birth: Baie-Mahault, Guadeloupe, France
- Height: 1.71 m (5 ft 7 in)
- Position: Winger

Team information
- Current team: Concarneau (on loan from Rennes)

Youth career
- 2013–2022: Stade Lamentinois
- 2022–2024: Rennes

Senior career*
Years	Team	Apps	(Gls)
2023–	Rennes II	37	(7)
2025–	Rennes	2	(0)
2026–	→ Concarneau (loan)	0	(0)

International career^{‡}
2024–2025	France U18	8	(0)
- * Club domestic league appearances and goals as of 23:28, 16 May 2026 (UTC) ‡ National team caps and goals as of 23:28, 16 May 2026 (UTC)

Lucas Rosier (born 12 March 2007) is a French professional footballer who plays as a winger for Ligue 3 club Concarneau on loan from Rennes.

== Career ==
Rosier is a product of the Guadeloupean club Stade Lamentinois before moving to Metropolitan France with Rennes in 2022 where he finished his development. On 27 July 2024, he signed his first professional contract with Rennes until 2028. He made his senior and professional debut with Rennes as a substitute in a 4–1 win over Strasbourg on 2 November 2025.

For the 2026–27 season, Rosier has been loaned to Concarneau in Ligue 3.

== International career ==
Born in Guadeloupe, Rosier was called up to the France U18s in 2024.
