= Maxime Etuin =

French footballer (born 1995)

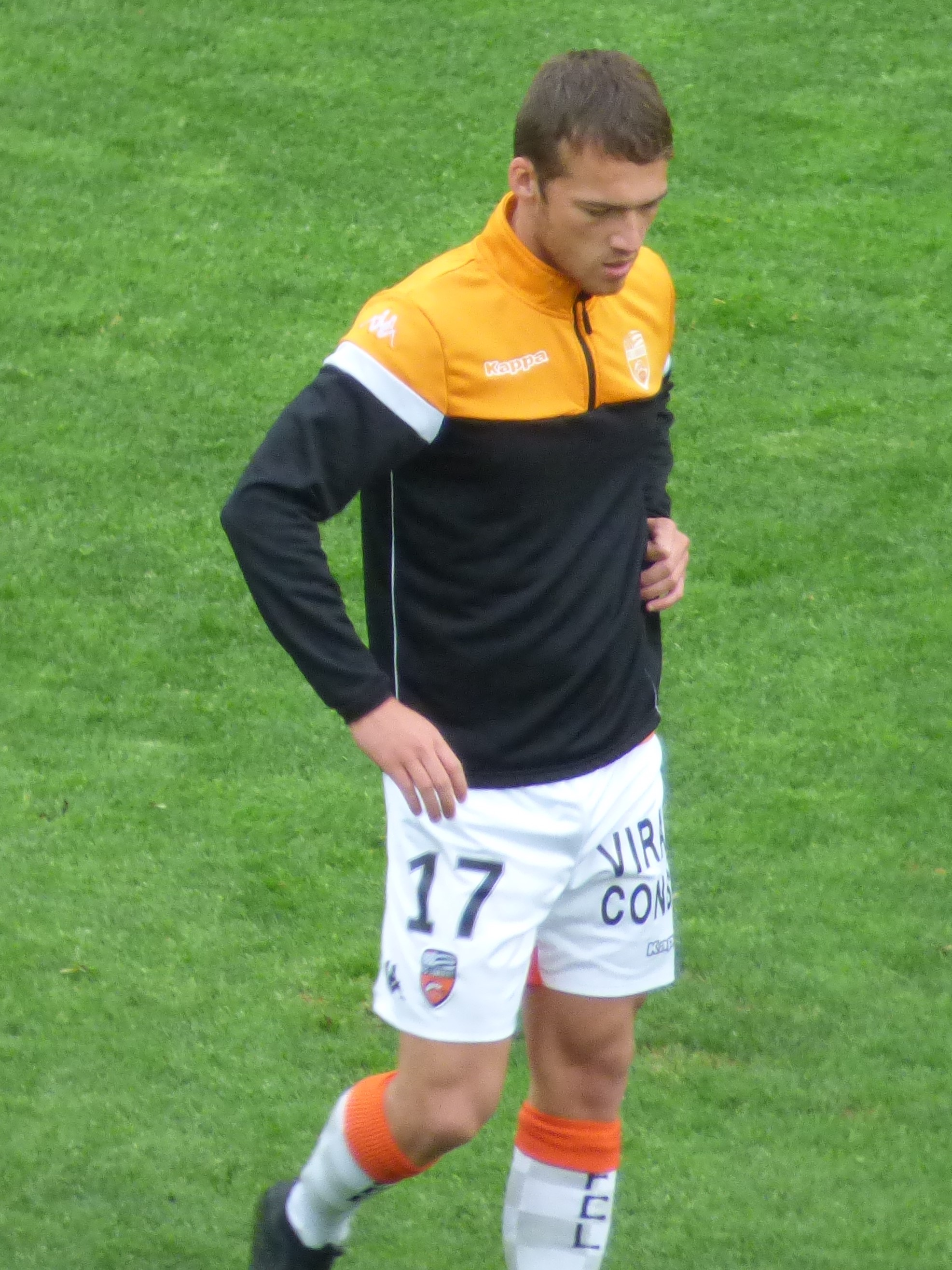
- Etuin in 2019

Personal information
- Date of birth: 18 August 1995 (age 31)
- Place of birth: Quimper, France
- Height: 1.74 m (5 ft 9 in)
- Position: Midfielder

Team information
- Current team: Villefranche
- Number: 8

Youth career
- 2006–2009: Kerfeunteun
- 2007–2013: Rennes

Senior career*
Years	Team	Apps	(Gls)
2013–2015	Rennes II	36	(5)
2015–2020	Lorient II	85	(8)
2018–2020	Lorient	34	(0)
2020–2021	Le Mans	20	(0)
2021–2025	Concarneau	126	(11)
2025–2026	Caen	25	(0)
2026–	Villefranche	3	(0)
- * Club domestic league appearances and goals as of 5 September 2026

Maxime Etuin (born 18 August 1995) is a French professional footballer who plays as a midfielder for Ligue 3 club Villefranche.

== Career ==
Etuin begun his footballing training in his hometown of Quimper in France, and became an academy product of Stade Rennais F.C. After becoming unable to progress to Rennes' first team, he transferred to FC Lorient to continue his professional training. He made his professional debut for Lorient in a 4–1 Ligue 2 win over Gazélec Ajaccio on 13 January 2018.

Etuin joined Championnat National side Le Mans FC in August 2020, having been released by Lorient after the club's promotion to Ligue 1 in the 2019–20 season.

On 11 June 2021, he signed with Concarneau.
