= Baptiste Mouazan =

French footballer (born 2001)

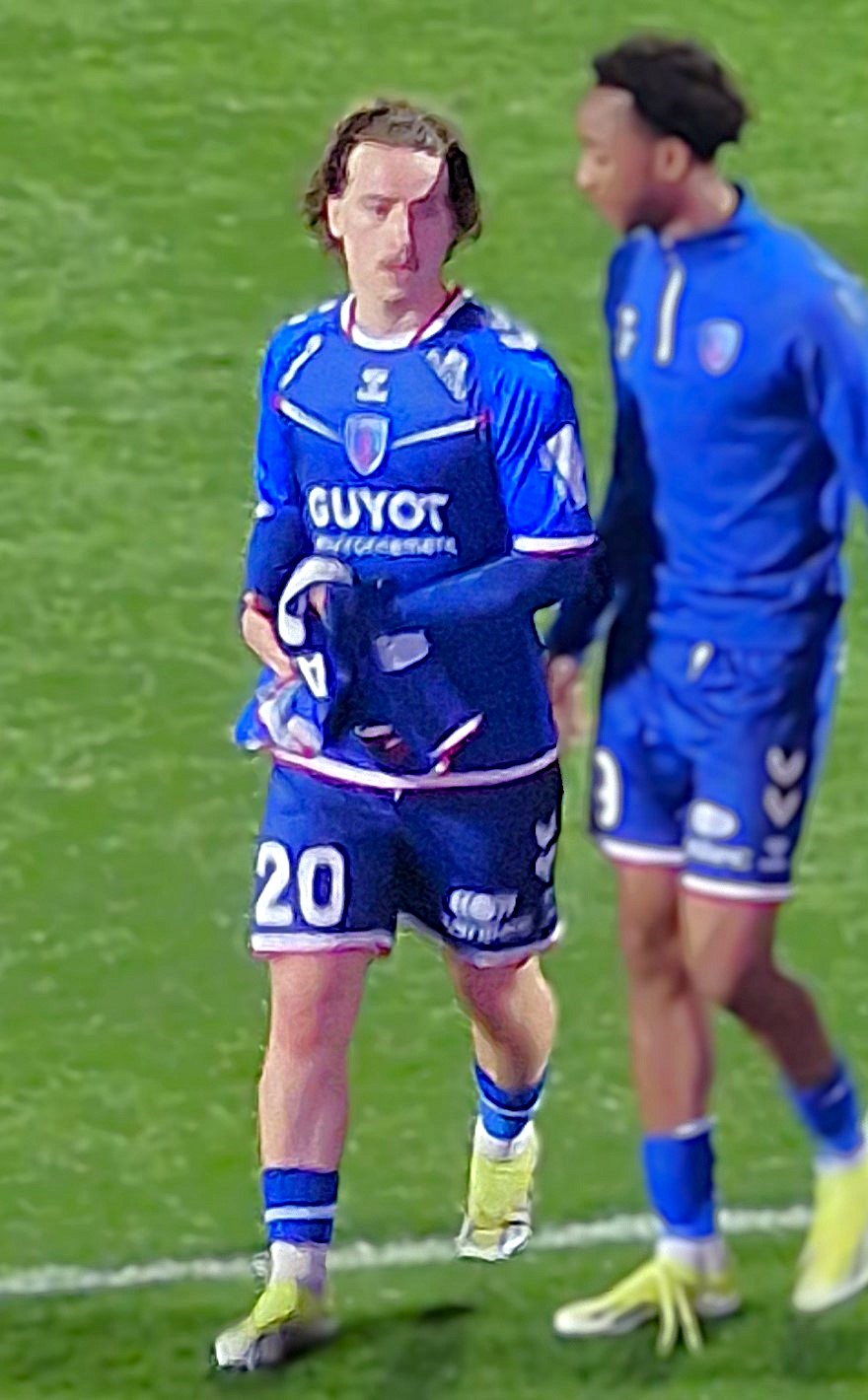
- Mouazan in 2024

Personal information
- Date of birth: 27 September 2001 (age 25)
- Place of birth: Rennes, France
- Height: 1.74 m (5 ft 9 in)
- Position: Midfielder

Team information
- Current team: Grenoble
- Number: 10

Youth career
- 2010–2014: Rennes
- 2014–2015: CPB Bréquigny
- 2015–2021: Lorient

Senior career*
Years	Team	Apps	(Gls)
2018–2022	Lorient B	46	(4)
2021–2022	Lorient	4	(0)
2022–2023	Nancy	27	(2)
2022–2023	Nancy B	3	(1)
2023–2025	Concarneau	64	(14)
2025–	Grenoble	19	(0)
- * Club domestic league appearances and goals as of 12 May 2026

Baptiste Mouazan (born 27 September 2001) is a French professional footballer who plays as a midfielder for Ligue 2 club Grenoble.

== Career ==
A youth product of Rennes, CPB Bréquigny, and Lorient, Mouazan began his senior career with the reserves of Lorient. He signed his first professional contract with the club on 7 July 2021. He made his professional debut with Lorient in a 4–0 Ligue 1 tie with Strasbourg on 31 October 2021, coming on as a late sub in the 77th minute

On 28 June 2022, Mouazan signed a three-year deal with Nancy.

On 28 July 2023, Mouazan signed a one-year deal with Concarneau, with an option to increase it by one year.
