= Isaac Matondo =

Footballer (born 1999)

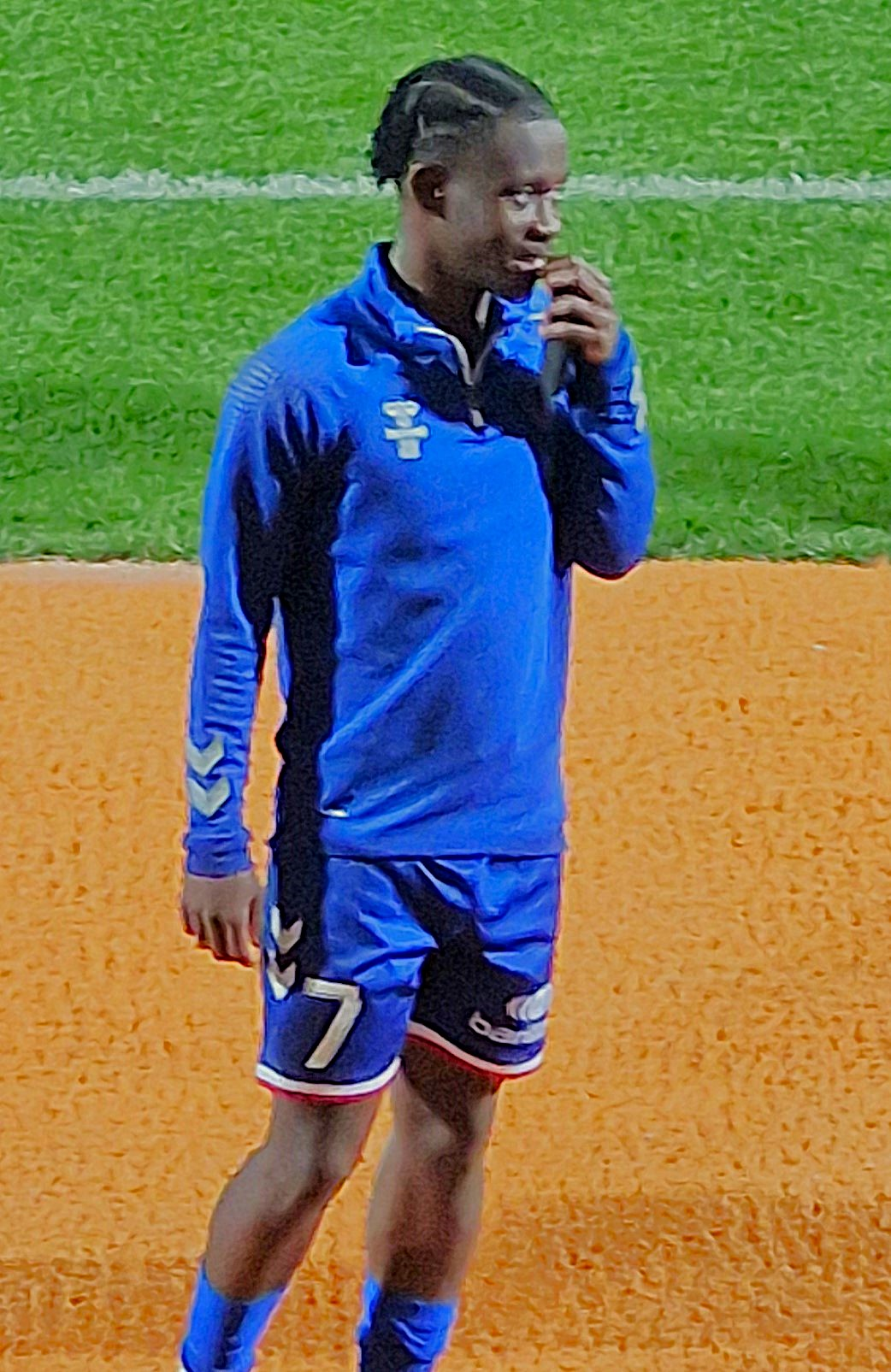
- Matondo in 2024

Personal information
- Date of birth: 24 March 1999 (age 27)
- Place of birth: Kinshasa, DR Congo
- Height: 1.68 m (5 ft 6 in)
- Position: Midfielder

Team information
- Current team: Koper
- Number: 45

Youth career
- 2009–2010: AS Chantepie
- 2010–2017: Rennes

Senior career*
Years	Team	Apps	(Gls)
2017–2020	Rennes B	60	(13)
2021	Sion	0	(0)
2022	Fougères	12	(10)
2022–2023	Les Herbiers	29	(16)
2023–2024	Concarneau	29	(1)
2024–	Koper	28	(4)

International career
2017–2018	France U19	10	(3)
2018–2019	France U20	7	(0)
- * Club domestic league appearances and goals as of 25 June 2025

Isaac Matondo (born 24 March 1999) is a professional footballer who plays as a midfielder for Slovenian PrvaLiga club Koper. Born in DR Congo, he represented France at youth international level.

== Club career ==
Matondo was born in Kinshasa, DR Congo. He moved to France in 2009, soon joining the academy of Rennes after initially playing for nearby club AS Chantepie. He made his way through Rennes's youth ranks, eventually playing for the club's reserve side starting in 2017. In January 2019, he made his first appearance on the teamsheet for Rennes's senior team in a Coupe de France match.

In 2021, Matondo joined Swiss club Sion on a four-year contract. However, he terminated his contract after not being able to play for the first team due to the high number of foreign players at the club. In January 2022, Matondo signed for Championnat National 3 club Fougères on a contract until the end of the season. Following "good performances" during which he scored ten goals and provided two assists in twelve league games, he signed for Championnat National 2 club Les Herbiers in June 2022. In the 2022–23 season with Les Herbiers, Matondo scored sixteen goals in twenty-nine matches, and was considered a "revelation".

On 24 June 2023, Matondo signed for Ligue 2 club Concarneau on a two-year deal. He made his debut in a 0–0 draw against Bastia on 5 August 2023.

On 5 September 2024, Matondo signed for Slovenian PrvaLiga club Koper.

== International career ==
Matondo holds both French and DR Congolese nationalities.

He made his debut for the France under-19s in July 2017, eventually scoring three goals in ten matches for the team. He played seven matches for the under-20s from September 2018 to March 2019.
