= Fahd El Khoumisti =

French footballer (born 1993)

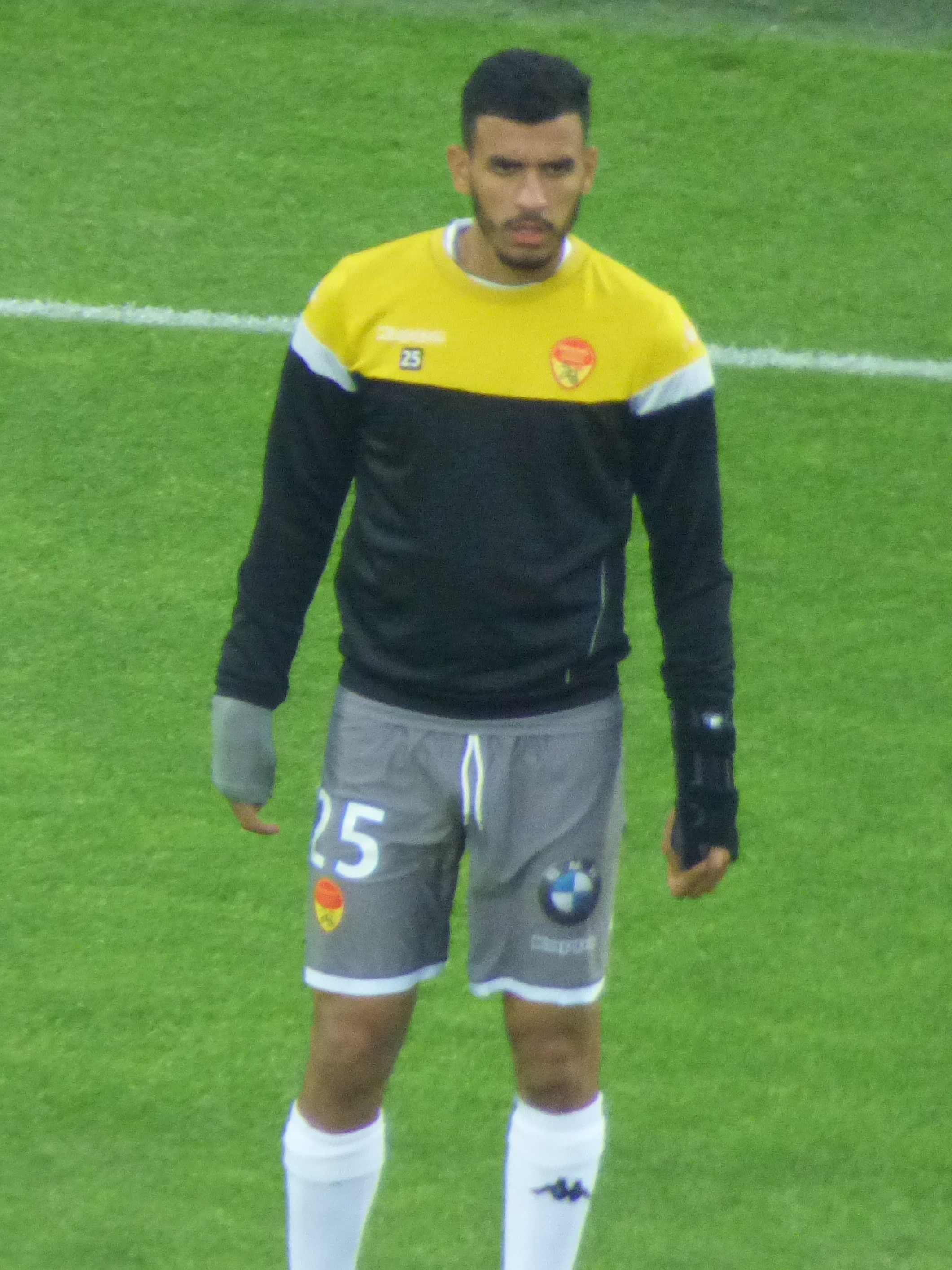
- El Khoumisti in 2019

Personal information
- Date of birth: 1 June 1993 (age 33)
- Place of birth: Mamers, France
- Height: 1.80 m (5 ft 11 in)
- Position: Forward

Team information
- Current team: Caen
- Number: 9

Youth career
- 1999–2007: SA Mamers
- 2007–2011: SOM Le Mans
- 2011–2012: Sablé

Senior career*
| Years | Team | Apps | (Gls) |
| 2012–2013 | La Suze | 11 | (1) |
| 2013–2016 | Thouars | 45 | (6) |
| 2016–2017 | Fontenay | 29 | (14) |
| 2017–2018 | Paris Saint-Germain B | 19 | (12) |
| 2018–2021 | Orléans | 31 | (5) |
| 2018–2021 | Orléans B | 5 | (5) |
| 2019–2020 | → Le Puy (loan) | 15 | (5) |
| 2021–2022 | Concarneau | 51 | (26) |
| 2022 | Le Mans | 8 | (3) |
| 2022–2024 | Concarneau | 20 | (13) |
| 2024–2026 | Orléans | 57 | (35) |
| 2026– | Caen | 0 | (0) |
- * Club domestic league appearances and goals as of 23 June 2026

Fahd El Khoumisti (born 1 June 1993) is a French professional footballer who plays as a forward for Ligue 3 club Caen.

== Early life ==
El Khoumisti was born in Mamers, in the West of France, to Moroccan parents. He holds Moroccan nationality and acquired French nationality on 24 June 2008, through the collective effect of his parents' naturalization.

== Club career ==
El Khoumsiti played for various teams in the lower divisions of France to start his career. He joined the Paris Saint-Germain B team in 2017, and had a successful season, finishing as the top scorer on the team with 12 goals.

On 6 June 2018, El Khoumisti transferred to Orléans. He made his professional debut with Orléans in a 2–0 Ligue 2 loss to Lens on 27 July 2018. In October 2019, he was loaned to Le Puy for the remainder of the 2019–20 season.

In January 2021, El Khoumisti signed for Concarneau.

On 27 June 2022, El Khoumisti moved to Le Mans. On 30 November 2022 however, El Khoumisti returned to Concarneau.
