= Vincent Viot =

French footballer (born 1994)

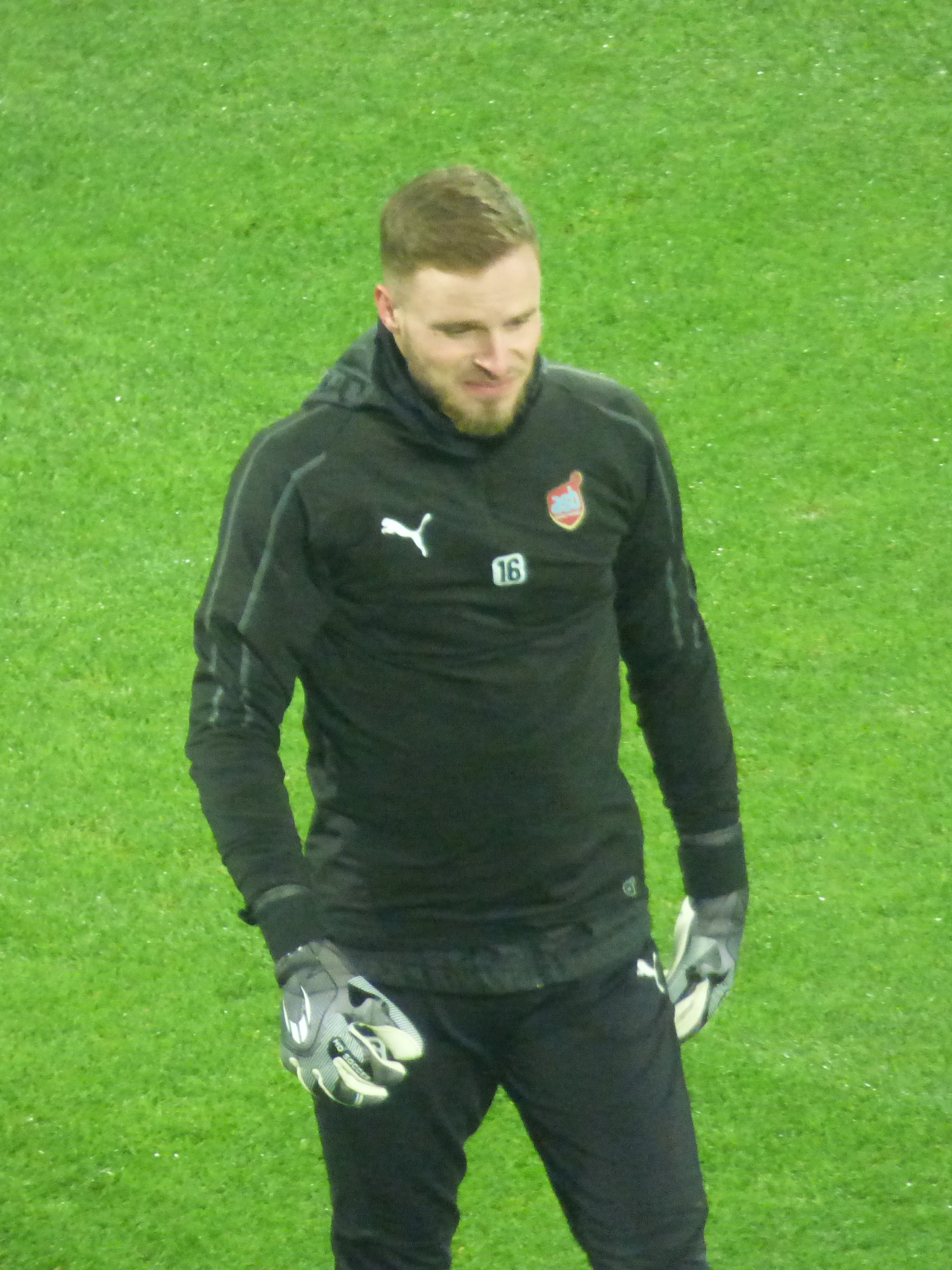
- Viot in 2019

Personal information
- Date of birth: 17 May 1994 (age 32)
- Place of birth: Le Mans, France
- Height: 1.82 m (6 ft 0 in)
- Position: Goalkeeper

Team information
- Current team: Concarneau
- Number: 1

Youth career
- 2004–2014: Le Mans

Senior career*
Years	Team	Apps	(Gls)
2012–2014	Le Mans II	9	(0)
2014–2016	Luçon	4	(0)
2016–2020	Béziers	30	(0)
2020	Béziers II	3	(0)
2020–2022	Concarneau	68	(0)
2022–2025	Orléans	95	(0)
2025–	Concarneau	23	(0)
- * Club domestic league appearances and goals as of 23 June 2026

Vincent Viot (French: [vɛ̃sɑ̃ vjo]; born 17 May 1994) is a French professional footballer who plays as goalkeeper for Ligue 3 club Concarneau.

== Career ==
Viot trained at Le Mans FC, before spending two seasons with Vendée Luçon Football as number two goalkeeper. He signed for Béziers in August 2016 when Luçon filed for bankruptcy.

Viot made his debut at the professional level for Béziers in a 2–1 Ligue 2 loss to AC Ajaccio on 11 January 2019. In June 2020 he signed a two-year deal with Concarneau as their first choice goalkeeper.

On 26 May 2022, Viot signed with Orléans for the 2022–23 season.
