= Amine Boutrah =

French footballer (born 2000)

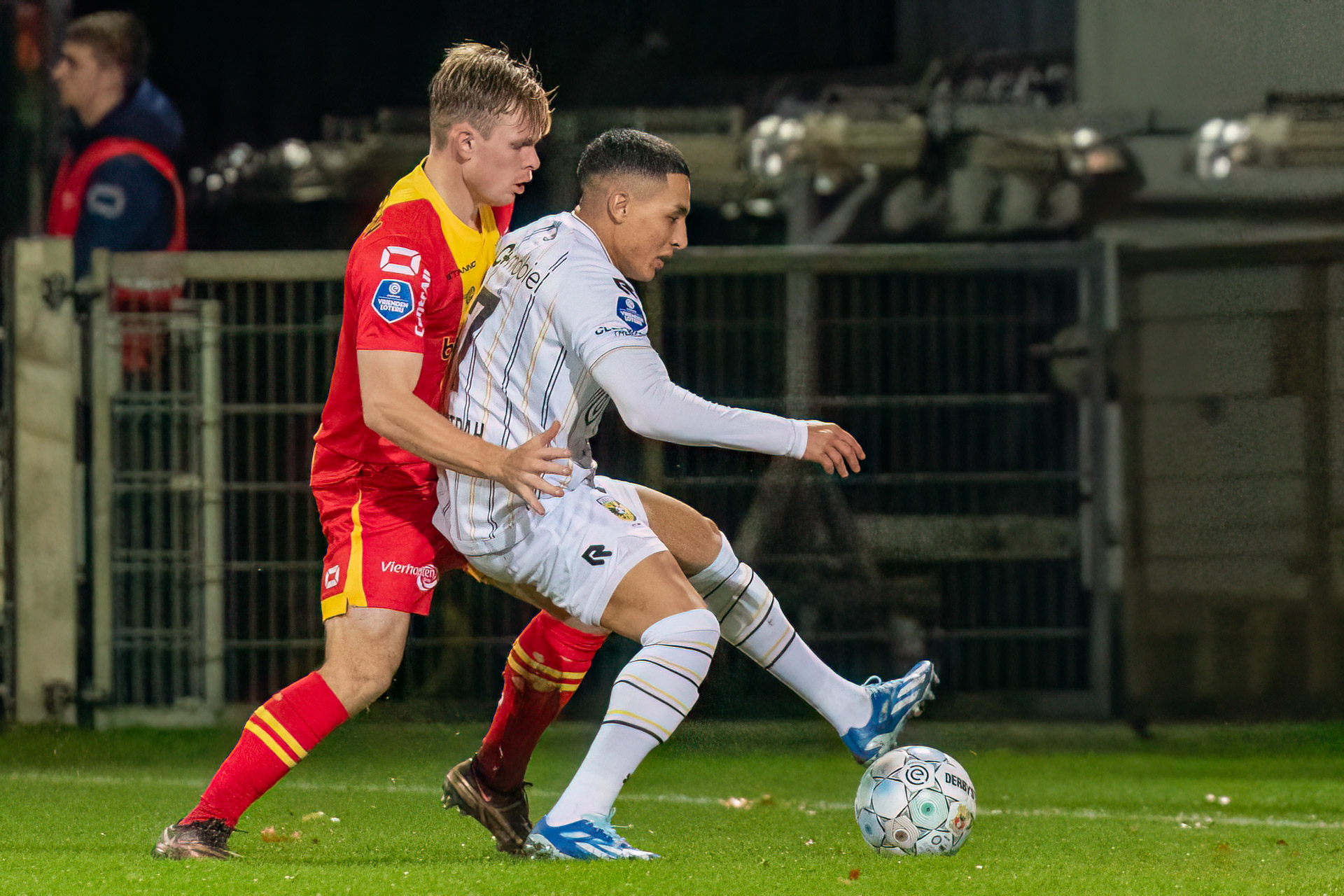
- Boutrah against Go Ahead Eagles in 2023

Personal information
- Date of birth: 26 October 2000 (age 26)
- Place of birth: Porto-Vecchio, France
- Height: 1.71 m (5 ft 7 in)
- Position: Midfielder

Team information
- Current team: Bursaspor

Senior career*
Years	Team	Apps	(Gls)
2017–2019	Bastia	15	(4)
2019–2020	GC Lucciana	20	(8)
2021–2023	Concarneau	64	(13)
2023–2024	Vitesse	29	(3)
2024–2026	Bastia	61	(8)
2026–	Bursaspor	0	(0)
- * Club domestic league appearances and goals as of 8 June 2026

Amine Boutrah (born 26 October 2000) is a French professional footballer who plays as a midfielder for TFF 1. Lig club Bursaspor.

== Early life ==
Boutrah was born on 26 October 2000 in France. Of Moroccan descent through his parents, he is a native of Porto-Vecchio, France.

== Career ==
Boutrah started his career with French side Bastia in 2017, where he made fifteen league appearances and scored four goals. Two years later, he signed for French side GC Lucciana, where he made twenty league appearances and scored eight goals.

In 2021, Boutrah signed for French third tier side Concarneau. In 2023, he signed for Dutch top flight side Vitesse. Altogether, he made twenty-nine league appearances and scored three goals while playing for the club. On 26 June 2024, Boutrah returned to Bastia.

== Style of play ==
Boutrah mainly operates as an attacking midfielder. Speaking to French newspaper Ouest-France manager Zeljko Corlija described him as "a player with very good speed and change of pace, he has all the qualities of a modern footballer. We had him play in a 3-5-2 system, but he prefers a system with 4 defenders to play as a winger, or behind the striker as a playmaker. There, he can drop back to bring up the balls. He likes to have a little freedom".
