= 2022–23 Championnat National =

Championnat National
- Season: 2022–23
- Dates: 12 August 2022 – 26 May 2023
- Champions: Concarneau
- Promoted: Concarneau; Dunkerque
- Relegated: Sedan (to Régional 3); Bourg-en-Bresse; Stade Briochin; Le Puy; Paris 13 Atletico; Borgo
- Matches: 306
- Goals: 766 (2.5 per match)
- Top goalscorer: 16 Fahd El Khoumisti, Le Mans and Concarneau
- Biggest home win: Le Mans 6–1 Sedan; Game week 2, 22 August 2022
- Biggest away win: Borgo 0–5 Avranches; Game week 16, 15 December 2022
- Highest scoring: 7 goals Le Mans 6–1 Sedan; Game week 2, 22 August 2022; Avranches 3–4 Dunkerque; Game week 13, 25 November 2022; Martigues 4–3 Versailles; Game week 34, 26 May 2023
- Longest winning run: 7 (Dunkerque)
- Longest unbeaten run: 16 (Martigues)
- Longest winless run: 11 (Stade Briochin)
- Longest losing run: 5 (Borgo; Avranches)

The 2022–23 Championnat National season was the 30th since the establishment of the Championnat National, and the 24th in its current format, which served as the third division of the French football league system. Two clubs were promoted to Ligue 2 and six relegated after this season as adjustment for Ligue 1's reduction in size from 20 to 18 next season. As a result, no promotion play-offs were held.

== Team changes ==
Team changes from 2021–22 Championnat National.

=== To National ===
Promoted from 2021–22 Championnat National 2

- Versailles
- Martigues
- Paris 13 Atletico
- Le Puy

Relegated from 2021–22 Ligue 2

- Dunkerque
- Nancy

=== From National ===
Relegated to 2022–23 Championnat National 2

- Sète (Note: On 28 June 2022, the DNCG further ruled that Sète would be relegated to Championnat National 2 for the 2022–23 season, due to financial mismanagement. On 12 July, the decision was upheld at the appeal hearing, meaning Bastia-Borgo were reprieved from relegation.)
- Chambly
- Créteil
- Boulogne

Promoted to 2022–23 Ligue 2

- Laval
- Annecy

=== Stadia and locations ===
Location of teams in 2022–23 National

Club	Location	Venue	Capacity
Avranches	Avranches	Stade René Fenouillère	2,000
Borgo	Borgo	Stade Paul-Antoniotti	1,300
Bourg-Péronnas	Bourg-en-Bresse	Stade Marcel-Verchère	11,400
Châteauroux	Châteauroux	Stade Gaston Petit	17,173
Cholet	Cholet	Stade Pierre Blouen	9,000
Concarneau	Concarneau	Stade Guy Piriou	6,500
Dunkerque	Dunkerque	Stade Marcel-Tribut	4,933
Le Mans	Le Mans	MMArena	25,000
Le Puy	Le Puy-en-Velay	Stade Charles Massot	4,800
Martigues	Martigues	Stade Francis Turcan	8,290
Nancy	Nancy	Stade Marcel Picot	20,087
Paris 13 Atletico	Paris (Paris 13)	Stade Sébastien Charléty (Note: Stade Boutroux is not of sufficient standard for Championnat National, although it is being renovated. Paris 13 Atletico will start the season at Stade Sébastien Charléty)	20,000
Orléans	Orléans	Stade de la Source	7,000
Red Star	Paris (Saint-Ouen)	Stade Bauer	10,000
Stade Briochin	Saint-Brieuc	Fred-Aubert Stadium	10,600
Sedan	Sedan	Stade Louis Dugauguez	23,189
Versailles	Paris (Paris 16)	Stade Jean-Bouin (Note: Stade de Montbauron is not of sufficient standard for Championnat National. Versailles will play their games at Stade Jean-Bouin.)	19,904

=== Number of teams by regions ===
Teams	Region	Team(s)
3	Île-de-France	Versailles, Paris 13 Atletico and Red Star
3	Auvergne-Rhône-Alpes	Le Puy Foot 43 Auvergne, Bourg-Péronnas and Villefranche
2	Brittany	Concarneau and Saint-Brieuc
2	Centre-Val de Loire	Châteauroux and Orléans
2	Pays de la Loire	Cholet and Le Mans
2	Grand Est	Nancy and Sedan
1	Corsica	Borgo
1	Normandy	Avranches
1	Provence-Alpes-Côte d'Azur	Martigues
1	Hauts-de-France	Dunkerque

== League table ==
Pos	Team	Pld	W	D	L	GF	GA	GD	Pts	Promotion or relegation
1	Concarneau (C, P)	34	19	6	9	60	37	+23	62 (Note: Concarneau were deducted one point for fielding a suspended player against Orléans on 12 August 2022. Orléans were awarded a 3–0 win.)	Promotion to Ligue 2
2	Dunkerque (P)	34	19	5	10	50	32	+18	62	Promotion to Ligue 2
3	Red Star	34	17	9	8	51	30	+21	60	
4	Martigues	34	15	15	4	54	40	+14	60	
5	Versailles	34	14	9	11	41	41	0	51	
6	Villefranche	34	11	13	10	49	40	+9	46	
7	Sedan	34	12	10	12	41	47	−6	46	Administrative relegation
8	Cholet	34	11	12	11	38	41	−3	45	
9	Avranches	34	14	4	16	44	46	−2	45 (Note: Avranches were deducted one point for fielding a suspended player against Cholet on 12 August 2022. Cholet were awarded a 3–0 win.)	
10	Orléans	34	10	14	10	38	37	+1	44	
11	Châteauroux	34	12	8	14	41	46	−5	44	
12	Le Mans	34	10	13	11	50	42	+8	43	
13	Nancy (T)	34	10	12	12	37	42	−5	41 (Note: Nancy were deducted one point for fielding a player against Concarneau on 28 March 2023, who was suspended when the game originally took place (and was subsequently abandoned) on 13 February 2023. Concarneau were awarded a 3–0 win.)	Spared from relegation
14	Bourg-Péronnas (R)	34	9	13	12	42	46	−4	40	Relegation to Championnat National 2
15	Stade Briochin (R)	34	8	14	12	36	46	−10	38	Relegation to Championnat National 2
16	Le Puy (R)	34	7	14	13	34	50	−16	35	Relegation to Championnat National 2
17	Paris 13 Atletico (R)	34	6	13	15	28	42	−14	31	Relegation to Championnat National 2
18	Borgo (R)	34	6	8	20	32	61	−29	26	Relegation to Championnat National 2

Source: Soccerway
Rules for classification: 1) head-to-head results; 2) head-to-head goal difference; 3) goal difference; 4) goals scored; 5) fair play points
(C) Champions; (P) Promoted; (R) Relegated; (T) Qualified, but not yet for the particular phase indicated

== Top scorers ==
As of end of season.

Rank	Player	Club	Goals
1	(France) Fahd El Khoumisti	Le Mans and Concarneau	16
2	(Ivory Coast) Armand Gnanduillet	Le Mans	14
2	(France) Rayan Ghrieb	Dunkerque	14
4	(Madagascar) Alexandre Ramalingom	Sedan	13
4	(France) Idrissa Ba	Villefranche	13
4	(Tunisia) Mohamed Ben Fredj	Le Puy	13
4	(France) Goduine Koyalipou	Avranches	13
8	(France) Hicham Benkaid	Stade Briochin	12
8	(France) Antoine Rabillard	Concarneau	12
10	(France) Amine Boutrah	Concarneau	11
10	(The Gambia) Yankuba Jarju	Cholet	11

== Post-season administrative relegations and reprieves ==
On 6 June 2023, the DNCG announced administrative relegation to Championnat National 2 for Sedan. Sedan appealed the decision, and the DNCG appeal committee elected to take stronger action, excluding the club from all national championships, effectively relegating the club to the sixth tier. As a result, Nancy were handed a reprieve from relegation.

Nancy themselves were originally handed an administrative relegation by the DNCG, but this was successfully appealed.

Châteauroux were also initially punished with relegation by the DNCG, but successfully appealed and retained their place in the division.

Bourg-Péronnas were initially handed an administrative relegation to Championnat National 3 on top of their sporting relegation, but this was also successfully appealed.

== Attendances ==
#	Club	Average
1	Nancy	8,282
2	Le Mans	4,574
3	Châteauroux	3,285
4	Concarneau	3,060
5	Orléans	2,532
6	Red Star	2,430
7	Sedan	2,411
8	Dunkerque	2,334
9	Martigues	1,926
10	Stade brochin	1,675
11	FBBP	1,605
12	Villefranche	1,364
13	Avranches	855
14	Versailles	741
15	Le Puy	721
16	Cholet	654
17	Paris 13 Atletico	303
18	Borgo	180
