= US Concarneau =

French football club

Concarneau
- Full name: Union Sportive Concarnoise
- Nickname: USC
- Founded: 1911; 115 years ago
- Ground: Stade Guy-Piriou
- Capacity: 5,800 (1,206 seated)
- President: Jacques Piriou
- Manager: Stéphane Moulin
- League: Ligue 3
- 2025–26: Championnat National, 9th of 17
- Website: www.usc-concarneau.com
| Home colours | Away colours | Third colours |

Union Sportive Concarnoise (French pronunciation: [ynjɔ̃ spɔʁtiv kɔ̃kaʁnwaz]), better known as US Concarneau or just Concarneau (French pronunciation: [kɔ̃kaʁno]), is a football club based in Concarneau, France. As of the 2025–26 season, it competes in the Championnat National, the third tier of French football. The team plays its home matches at the 5,800-capacity Stade Guy-Piriou.

== History ==
The club was founded in 1911. The Stade Guy-Piriou, the club's 5,800-capacity stadium, was named after the club's former president.

Quarter-finalist of 2014–15 Coupe de France.

On 26 May 2023, Concarneau earned promotion to Ligue 2 for the first time in the club’s history, winning the 2022–23 Championnat National. During the 2023–24 Ligue 2 season, the played their home matches at the Stade Francis-Le Blé in Brest, the Stade du Moustoir in Lorient, and the Stade de Roudourou in Guingamp due to their Stade Guy-Piriou not being up to Ligue 2 standards.

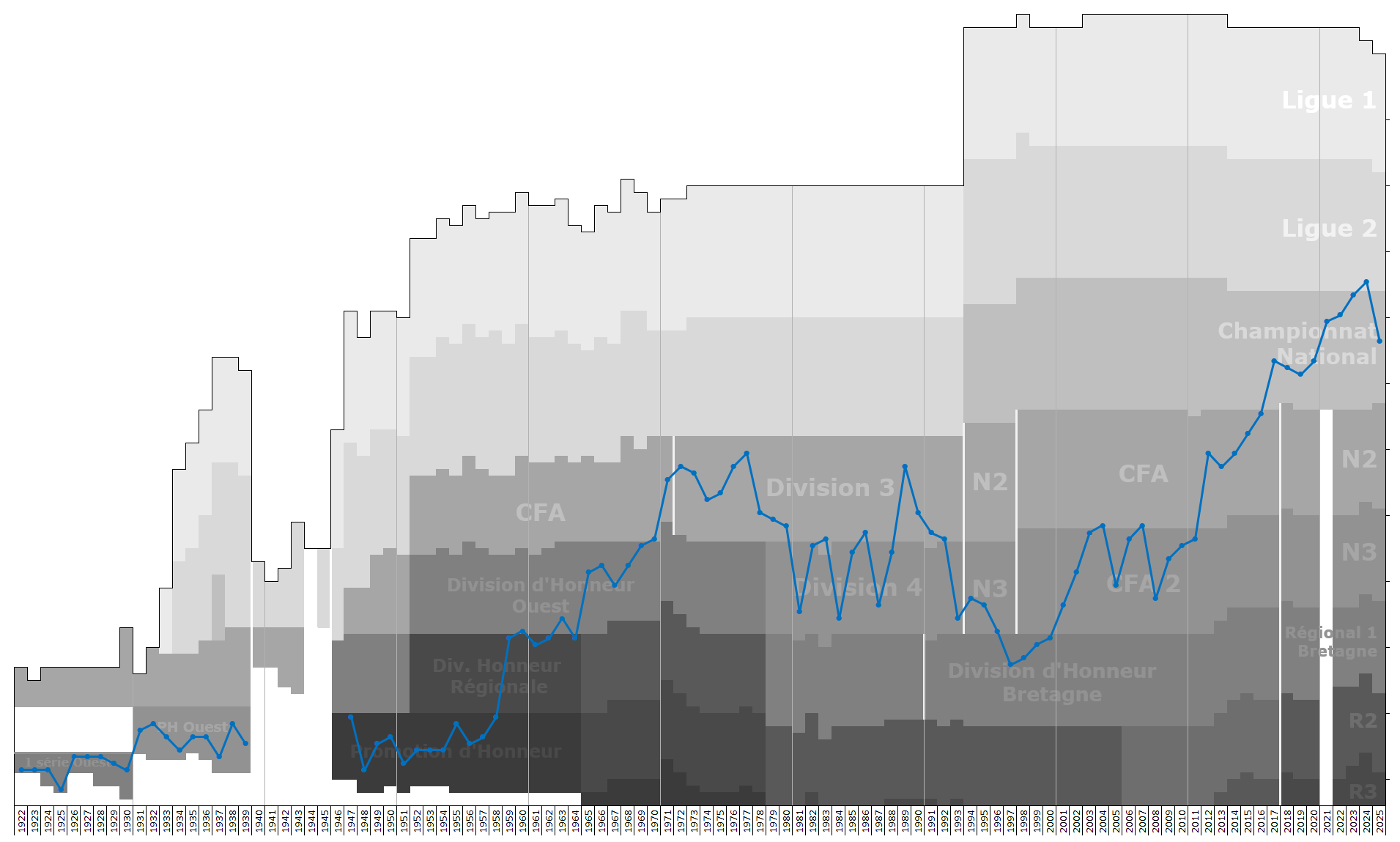
Historical league performance chart of US Concarneau

== Honours ==
US Concarneau honours
| Honour | No. | Years |
|---|---|---|
| Championnat National | 1 | 2022–23 |
| Championnat de France Amateur | 1 | 2015–16 |
| Division 4 | 1 | 1981–82 |
| Championnat de France Amateur 2 | 1 | 2005–06 |
| Division d'Honneur | 2 | 1968–69, 1999–2000 |

== Current squad ==
As of 5 September 2026.

Note: Flags indicate national team as defined under FIFA eligibility rules; some limited exceptions apply. Players may hold more than one non-FIFA nationality.

| No. | Pos. | Nation | Player |
|---|---|---|---|
| 1 | GK | FRA | Vincent Viot |
| 2 | DF | ALG | Kaïs Benabdelouahed |
| 3 | DF | FRA | Sacha Inquel |
| 5 | DF | FRA | Baptiste Etcheverria |
| 6 | DF | FRA | Djessine Seba |
| 7 | FW | FRA | Jules Varvat |
| 8 | MF | FRA | Mathis Picouleau |
| 9 | FW | FRA | Stan Janno |
| 10 | MF | FRA | Garland Gbelle |
| 11 | FW | FRA | Nicolas Mercier |
| 14 | FW | FRA | Lucas Rosier (on loan from Rennes) |
| 15 | DF | MTN | Demba Yatera |
| 16 | GK | FRA | Valentin Cenatiempo |
| 17 | FW | FRA | Aly Sidibé |

| No. | Pos. | Nation | Player |
|---|---|---|---|
| 18 | MF | FRA | Flavio Da Silva |
| 19 | FW | FRA | Omar Daf |
| 20 | FW | FRA | Mathéo Ntumi |
| 21 | MF | TUN | Youssef Ben Mahmoud |
| 22 | MF | FRA | Baptiste Macon |
| 23 | MF | FRA | Loïc Goujon |
| 24 | DF | FRA | Charles Divialle-Corbière |
| 25 | DF | GUF | Grégory Lafontaine |
| 26 | MF | FRA | Thibault Sinquin |
| 27 | DF | FRA | Jimmy Halby Touré |
| 28 | MF | FRA | Glenn Hocquet |
| 29 | MF | COM | Raimane Daou |
| 40 | GK | FRA | Pierre Patron |

== Management Staff ==
| Position | Name |
|---|---|
| Manager | (France) Stéphane Rossi |
| Assistant Manager | (France) Pascal Laguillier (France) Hugues Prévost |
| Goalkeeper Coach | (France) Ronan Nedelec |
| Video Analyst | (France) Mathieu Le Hen |
