= 2022–23 US Quevilly-Rouen Métropole season =

US Quevilly-Rouen Métropole
2022–23 season
- Chairman: Michel Mallet
- Manager: Fabien Mercadal
- Stadium: Stade Robert Diochon
- Ligue 2: 11th
- Coupe de France: Seventh round
- Top goalscorer: League: Louis Mafouta (10); All: Louis Mafouta (10)
Home colours	Away colours

The 2022–23 season was the 121st in the history of US Quevilly-Rouen Métropole and their second consecutive season in the second division. The club participated in Ligue 2 and the Coupe de France.

== Players ==
As of 10 January 2023.

Note: Flags indicate national team as defined under FIFA eligibility rules; some limited exceptions apply. Players may hold more than one non-FIFA nationality.

No.	Pos.	Nation	Player
1	GK	FRA	Nicolas Lemaître
2	DF	FRA	Alpha Sissoko
4	MF	FRA	Balthazar Pierret
5	DF	FRA	Till Cissokho
6	MF	FRA	Kalidou Sidibé
7	MF	BFA	Mamady Bangré (on loan from Toulouse)
9	FW	CAF	Louis Mafouta
10	MF	FRA	Alexandre Bonnet
12	MF	FRA	Garland Gbelle
13	MF	FRA	Yann Boé-Kane
15	DF	TUN	Syam Ben Youssef
16	GK	GLP	Yohann Thuram-Ulien

No.	Pos.	Nation	Player
17	MF	BFA	Gustavo Sangaré
18	DF	SEN	Christophe Diedhiou
19	FW	FRA	Mamadou Camara
20	DF	FRA	Nadjib Cissé
22	DF	FRA	Samuel Loric (on loan from Lorient)
23	MF	CAN	Justin Smith (on loan from Nice)
24	DF	FRA	Jason Pendant
28	FW	FRA	Isaac Tshipamba
29	FW	FRA	Andrew Jung (on loan from Oostende)
30	GK	FRA	Rudy Boulais
45	FW	SEN	Issa Soumaré (on loan from Beerschot)

=== Out on loan ===
Note: Flags indicate national team as defined under FIFA eligibility rules; some limited exceptions apply. Players may hold more than one non-FIFA nationality.

No.	Pos.	Nation	Player
—	DF	FRA	Damon Bansais (on loan to Bourg-en-Bresse)

== Pre-season and friendlies ==
Win Draw Loss

9 July 2022 Friendly	Le Havre	2–1	Quevilly-Rouen	Le Havre
17:30 CEST (UTC+2)	Thiaré 18' (pen.); Lekhal 77'		Hountondji 6'	Stadium: Stade Charles Argentin

15 July 2022 Friendly	Paris Saint-Germain	2–0	Quevilly-Rouen	Saint-Germain-en-Laye
17:00 CEST (UTC+2)	Ramos 33' (pen.); Gassama 54'	Report	Tégar (yellow card) 87'	Stadium: Camp des Loges

20 July 2022 Friendly	Quevilly-Rouen	2–1	Le Mans	Le Petit-Quevilly
18:00 CEST (UTC+2)	Smith 28'; Kaloga 89'	Report	Gnanduillet 86'	Stadium: Stade Amable-et-Micheline-Lozai

23 July 2022 Friendly	Amiens	1–1	Quevilly-Rouen	Amiens
19:00 CEST (UTC+2)	Arokodare 23'	Report	Diedhiou 14'	Stadium: Stade de la Licorne

7 August 2022 Friendly	Paris 13 Atletico	1–1	Quevilly-Rouen	Paris
--:-- CEST (UTC+2)				Stadium: Stade Jean-Bouin; Attendance: 70

23 September 2022 Friendly	Amiens	2–5	Quevilly-Rouen	Amiens
15:00 CEST (UTC+2)	Bandé 4'; Arokodare 71'	Report	Camara 7'; Pierret 25'; Jung 47'; Mafouta 67'; Cissokho 70'	Stadium: Terrain Licorne B

10 December 2022 Friendly	Quevilly-Rouen	1–1	Laval	Le Petit-Quevilly
16:00 CET (UTC+1)				Stadium: Stade Robert Diochon

21 December 2022 Friendly	Paris Saint-Germain	3–1	Quevilly-Rouen	Saint-Germain-en-Laye
12:00 CET (UTC+1)	Gharbi 14'; Housni 30', 51'; Verratti (yellow card) 53'		Diedhiou 78'	Stadium: Centre d'entraînement Ooredoo; Referee: Willy Delajod

== Competitions ==
=== Overall record ===
Competition	First match	Last match	Starting round	Final position	Record							
Competition	First match	Last match	Starting round	Final position	Pld	W	D	L	GF	GA	GD	Win %
Ligue 2	30 July 2022	2 June 2023	Matchday 1	11th	38	12	14	12	47	49	−2	31.58
Coupe de France	29 October 2022		Seventh round	Seventh round	1	0	1	0	1	1	+0	0.00
Total					39	12	15	12	48	50	−2	30.77

Source: Soccerway

=== Ligue 2 ===
==== League table ====
Pos	Team	Pld	W	D	L	GF	GA	GD	Pts	Promotion or Relegation
9	Sochaux (D, R)	38	15	7	16	54	41	+13	52	Relegation to Championnat National
10	Grenoble	38	14	9	15	33	36	−3	51	
11	Quevilly-Rouen	38	12	14	12	47	49	−2	50	
12	Amiens	38	13	8	17	40	52	−12	47	
13	Pau	38	12	11	15	40	52	−12	47	

Source: Ligue 2
Rules for classification: 1) Points; 2) Goal difference; 3) Number of goals scored; 4) Head-to-head goal difference; 5) Fair play points
(D) Disqualified; (R) Relegated

==== Results summary ====
Overall								Home						Away					
Pld	W	D	L	GF	GA	GD	Pts	W	D	L	GF	GA	GD	W	D	L	GF	GA	GD
38	12	14	12	47	49	−2	50	6	9	4	28	24	+4	6	5	8	19	25	−6

Source: Ligue 2

==== Results by round ====
Round	1	2	3	4	5	6	7	8	9	10	11	12	13	14	15	16	17	18	19	20	21	22	23	24
Ground	H	A	H	A	H	A	H	A	H	A	H	A	A	H	A	H	A	H	A	H	A	H	A	H
Result	D	L	D	D	W	L	D	L	L	W	W	D	D	L	W	W	W	D	L	W	L	W	W	
Position	10	14	14	16	12	14	15	17	19	15	12	12	13	15	13	11	8	9	10	9	10	9	6	

Updated to match(es) played on 11 February 2023. Source: Ligue 2
A = Away; H = Home; W = Win; D = Draw; L = Loss

==== Matches ====
The league fixtures were announced on 17 June 2022.

30 July 2022 1	Quevilly-Rouen	0–0	Rodez	Le Petit-Quevilly
19:00 CEST (UTC+2)		Report		Stadium: Stade Robert Diochon; Attendance: 2,571; Referee: Antoine Valnet

6 August 2022 2	Paris FC	2–1	Quevilly-Rouen	Paris
19:00 CEST (UTC+2)	Bernauer 6'; Chahiri 33'	Report	Pierret 79'	Stadium: Stade Sébastien Charléty; Attendance: 2,752; Referee: Nicolas Rainville

15 August 2022 3	Quevilly-Rouen	2–2	Saint-Étienne	Le Petit-Quevilly
20:45 CEST (UTC+2)	Boé-Kane 13'; Gbelle 32'	Report	Krasso 37'; Cafaro 45'	Stadium: Stade Robert Diochon; Attendance: 7,500; Referee: Alexandre Perreau Niel

20 August 2022 4	Valenciennes	0–0	Quevilly-Rouen	Valenciennes
19:00 CEST (UTC+2)		Report		Stadium: Stade du Hainaut; Attendance: 4,443; Referee: Romain Lissorgue

27 August 2022 5	Quevilly-Rouen	2–1	Pau	Le Petit-Quevilly
19:00 CEST (UTC+2)	Soumaré 69'; Sangaré 76'	Report	Saivet 50'	Stadium: Stade Robert Diochon; Attendance: 2,500; Referee: William Toulliou

30 August 2022 6	Bordeaux	4–0	Quevilly-Rouen	Bordeaux
20:45 CEST (UTC+2)	Maja 7' (pen.); Pendant 21' (o.g.); Bakwa 41'; Delaurier-Chaubet 75'	Report		Stadium: Matmut Atlantique; Attendance: 15,383; Referee: Guillaume Paradis

2 September 2022 7	Quevilly-Rouen	3–3	Niort	Caen
20:45 CEST (UTC+2)	Soumaré 12', 40'; Mafouta 32'	Report	Boutobba 27' (pen.), 52' (pen.); Sagna 33'	Stadium: Stade Michel d'Ornano; Attendance: 200; Referee: Nicolas Rainville
Note: Match moved from Stade Robert Diochon due to a Rugby Pro D2 match being played at the stadium on the same day.

10 September 2022 8	Annecy	1–0	Quevilly-Rouen	Annecy
19:00 CEST (UTC+2)	Bastian (yellow card) 26'; Bosetti 74'; Gonçalvés (yellow card) 90+4'	Report	Sangaré (yellow card) 28'; Cissokho (yellow card) 31'	Stadium: Parc des Sports; Attendance: 4,114; Referee: Gaël Angoula

17 September 2022 9	Quevilly-Rouen	1–3	Laval	Le Petit-Quevilly
19:00 CEST (UTC+2)	Gbelle (yellow card) 27'; Diedhiou 34'; Cissokho (red card) 69'	Report	Durbant 7' (pen.); Maggiotti 10', 74'; Diaw (yellow card) 33'; Sylla (yellow card) 38'; A. Gonçalves (yellow card) 51'; B. Goncalves (yellow card) 58'; Naidji (yellow card) 54'; Mouali (yellow card) 90+2'	Stadium: Stade Robert Diochon; Attendance: 3,000; Referee: Remi Landry

1 October 2022 10	Caen	0–1	Quevilly-Rouen	Caen
19:00 CEST (UTC+2)	Cissé (yellow card) 47'; Teikeu (yellow card) 88'	Report	Camara 29'; Sidibé (yellow card) 47'; Pendant (yellow card) 83'; Sangaré (yellow card) 87'	Stadium: Stade Michel d'Ornano; Attendance: 13,031; Referee: Olivier Thual

8 October 2022 11	Quevilly-Rouen	3–1	Nîmes	Le Petit-Quevilly
19:00 CEST (UTC+2)	Diedhiou 18'; Mafouta 45', 56'	Report	Fomba (yellow card) 32'; N'Guessan (yellow card) 59'; Tchokounté 62'	Stadium: Stade Robert Diochon; Attendance: 2,900; Referee: Aurélien Petit

15 October 2022 12	Dijon	0–0	Quevilly-Rouen	Dijon
19:00 CEST (UTC+2)	Congré (yellow card) 61'	Report	Pendant (yellow card) 19'	Stadium: Stade Gaston Gérard; Attendance: 6,000; Referee: Thomas Leonard

22 October 2022 13	Sochaux	2–2	Quevilly-Rouen	Montbéliard
19:00 CEST (UTC+2)	Aaneba (yellow card) 29'; Sissoko (penalty scored) 57', (penalty scored) 90+5'; Ndiaye (yellow card) 80'	Report	Ben Youssef 32', (yellow card) 45'; Sissoko (yellow card) 35'; Soumaré (yellow card) 56', (goal) 71'	Stadium: Stade Auguste Bonal; Attendance: 11,037; Referee: Benjamin Lepaysant

5 November 2022 14	Quevilly-Rouen	0–1	Le Havre	Le Petit-Quevilly
19:00 CET (UTC+1)	Ben Youssef (yellow card) 45+2'; Pierret (yellow card) 58'	Report	El Hajjam (yellow card) 7'; Alioui (yellow card) 38', (goal) 55'; Casimir (yellow card) 41'; Richardson (yellow card) 64'; Gomes (yellow card) 88'; Soumah (yellow card) 90+6'	Stadium: Stade Robert Diochon; Attendance: 7,963; Referee: Alexandre Perreau Niel

12 November 2022 15	Amiens	0–2	Quevilly-Rouen	Amiens
19:00 CET (UTC+1)	Gélin (yellow card) 20'; Opoku (yellow card) 21'	Report	Cissokho 41'; Sangaré (yellow card) 46'; Mafouta 89'	Stadium: Stade de la Licorne; Attendance: 9,684; Referee: Gaël Angoula

26 December 2022 16	Quevilly-Rouen	2–0	Grenoble	Le Petit-Quevilly
19:00 CET (UTC+1)	Sidibé (yellow card) 31'; Cissé 65'; Mafouta 69'	Report	Tchaptchet (yellow card) 61'; Gersbach (yellow card) 71'	Stadium: Stade Robert Diochon; Attendance: 3,000; Referee: Azzédine Souifi

30 December 2022 17	Guingamp	0–2	Quevilly-Rouen	Guingamp
21:00 CET (UTC+1)	Gomis (yellow card) 83'	Report	Bangré 31'; Sissoko (yellow card) 37'; Sidibé (yellow card) 45+1'; Mafouta 48'	Stadium: Stade de Roudourou; Attendance: 9,894; Referee: Rémi Landry

10 January 2023 18	Quevilly-Rouen	1–1	Bastia	Le Petit-Quevilly
20:45 CET (UTC+1)	Mafouta 16'; Soumaré (yellow card) 53'; Sangaré (yellow card) 54'; Pierret (red card) 59'	Report	Salles-Lamonge (yellow card) 34'; Santelli 49'; Ducrocq (yellow card) 57'; Bohnert (yellow card) 79'; Guidi (yellow card) 82'	Stadium: Stade Robert Diochon; Attendance: 3,446; Referee: Antoine Valnet

13 January 2023 19	Metz	2–0	Quevilly-Rouen	Metz
20:45 CEST (UTC+2)	Jallow 72'; Mikautadze 90+2'	Report	Sidibé (yellow card) 66'	Stadium: Stade Saint-Symphorien; Attendance: 12,542; Referee: Romain Lissorgue

28 January 2023 20	Quevilly-Rouen	3–1	Paris FC	Le Petit-Quevilly
19:00 CET (UTC+1)	Sangaré 15', (yellow card) 41'; Ben Youssef (yellow card) 56'; Mafouta 62'; Soumaré (penalty scored) 87'	Report	Maçon (yellow card) 55'; Gueho (yellow card) 76'; López 82'; Guilavogui (yellow card) 86'	Stadium: Stade Robert Diochon; Attendance: 3,075; Referee: Rémi Landry

31 January 2023 21	Grenoble	1–0	Quevilly-Rouen	Grenoble
19:00 CEST (UTC+2)	Gaspar (yellow card) 34'; Bénet 71'; Sbaï (yellow card) 79'	Report	Loric (yellow card) 21'; Bonnet (yellow card) 43'; Boé-Kane (yellow card) 78'; Ben Youssef (yellow card) 82'	Stadium: Stade des Alpes; Attendance: 3,783; Referee: Alexandre Perreau Niel

3 February 2023 22	Quevilly-Rouen	2–0	Guingamp	Le Petit-Quevilly
20:45 CET (UTC+1)	Bangré 22', 68'; Jung (yellow card) 56'	Report	Diarra (yellow card) 15'; Sivis (yellow card) 89'	Stadium: Stade Robert Diochon; Attendance: 3,143; Referee: Azzédine Souifi

11 February 2023 23	Bastia	0–1	Quevilly-Rouen	Furiani
19:00 CET (UTC+1)	Dramé (yellow card) 29'; Sainati (yellow card) 58' (yellow-red card) 79'	Report	Guidi 22' (o.g.); Sidibé (yellow card) 49'; Mafouta (yellow card) 79'; Boé-Kane (yellow card) 90+2'	Stadium: Stade Armand-Cesari; Attendance: 8,826; Referee: Mikael Lesage

18 February 2023 24	Quevilly-Rouen	0–0	Sochaux	Le Petit-Quevilly
19:00 CET (UTC+1)	Soumaré (yellow card) 61'; Pendant (yellow card) 65'; Ben Youssef (yellow card) 90+2'	Report	Ndour (yellow card) 14'; Le Tallec (yellow card) 52'; Sissoko (red card) 90+1'	Stadium: Stade Robert Diochon; Attendance: 4,083; Referee: Faouzi Benchabane

25 February 2023 25	Laval	0–1	Quevilly-Rouen	Laval
19:00 CET (UTC+1)	Baudry (yellow card) 63'; Durbant (yellow card) 68'; Adéoti (yellow card) 78'; Da Silva (yellow card) 90+1'	Report	Pierret (yellow card) 42'; Sangaré 70'; Cissokho (yellow card) 78'	Stadium: Stade Francis Le Basser; Attendance: 5,628; Referee: Hakim Ben El Hadj

4 March 2023 26	Quevilly-Rouen	1–1	Valenciennes	Le Petit-Quevilly
19:00 CET (UTC+1)	Bangré 86'	Report	Grbić 1'; Diliberto (yellow card) 11'; Masson (yellow card) 50'; Hamache (yellow card) 56'; Debuchy (yellow card) 64'	Stadium: Stade Robert Diochon; Attendance: 3,217; Referee: Guillaume Paradis

11 March 2023 27	Nîmes	2–0	Quevilly-Rouen	Nîmes
19:00 CET (UTC+1)	Djiga (yellow card) 45+2'; Pagis 66', 71'	Report	Boé-Kane (yellow card) 19'; Pierret (yellow card) 57'	Stadium: Stade des Antonins; Attendance: 1,363; Referee: William Toulliou

18 March 2023 28	Quevilly-Rouen	1–2	Metz	Le Petit-Quevilly
19:00 CET (UTC+1)	Camara 90'	Report	Kouao (yellow card) 18'; I. Traoré (yellow card) 65'; Maziz 72'; N'Duquidi (yellow card) 77'; Maïga 80'	Stadium: Stade Robert Diochon; Attendance: 3,600; Referee: Alexandre Perreau Niel

1 April 2023 29	Rodez	1–0	Quevilly-Rouen	Rodez
19:00 CEST (UTC+2)	M'Pasi (yellow card) 21'; Depres (yellow card) 59'; Boissier 62', (yellow card) 70'	Report	Sidibé (yellow card) 55'	Stadium: Stade Paul-Lignon; Attendance: 2,577; Referee: Aurélien Petit

8 April 2023 30	Quevilly-Rouen	2–1	Caen	Rouen
19:00 CEST (UTC+2)	Jung 20'; Sangaré 38'; Sidibé (yellow card) 46' (yellow-red card) 57'; Gbelle (yellow card) 52'	Report	Vandermersch (yellow card) 40'; Mendy (penalty scored) 59', (yellow card) 88'; Diani (yellow card) 89'	Stadium: Stade Robert Diochon; Attendance: 4,591; Referee: Nicolas Rainville

15 April 2023 31	Quevilly-Rouen	2–2	Dijon	Rouen
19:00 CEST (UTC+2)	Ben Youssef (yellow card) 26'; Bangré (yellow card) 31', (goal) 42'; Mafouta 76' (pen.); Sidibé (yellow card) 90+3'	Report	Ahlinvi 50'; Le Bihan 53'; Rocchia (yellow card) 75'	Stadium: Stade Robert Diochon; Attendance: 2,645; Referee: Rémi Landry

22 April 2023 32	Le Havre	0–0	Rouen	Le Havre
19:00 CEST (UTC+2)	Opéri (yellow card) 75'	Report	Sidibé (yellow card) 56'	Stadium: Stade Océane; Attendance: 16,594; Referee: Aurélien Petit

29 April 2023 33	Quevilly-Rouen	2–2	Annecy	Rouen
19:00 CEST (UTC+2)	Sissoko (yellow card) 18'; Mafouta 62'; Soumaré 88'	Report	Boé-Kane 9' (o.g.); Lajugie (yellow card) 36'; Sahi 75'; Mendy (yellow card) 90+2'	Stadium: Stade Robert Diochon; Attendance: 3,015; Referee: Karim Abed

6 May 2023 34	Pau	3–4	Quevilly-Rouen	Pau
19:00 CEST (UTC+2)	Abzi (yellow card) 14'; Saivet (yellow card) 24', (goal) 55'; Begraoui (penalty scored) 30'; George 89'	Report	Ben Youssef (yellow card) 29'; Gbelle 44'; Bangré 57'; Pierret (yellow card) 69'; Sangaré 78'; Jung 90+2'; Mafouta (yellow card) 90+3'	Stadium: Nouste Camp; Attendance: 2,719; Referee: Alexandre Perreau Niel

13 May 2023 35	Quevilly-Rouen	0–0	Bordeaux	Rouen
19:00 CEST (UTC+2)	Cissokho (yellow card) 5'; Sissoko (yellow card) 90+4'	Report	Bokele (yellow card) 45+1'	Stadium: Stade Robert Diochon; Attendance: 7,113; Referee: Benjamin Lepaysant

20 May 2023 36	Saint-Étienne	4–2	Quevilly-Rouen	Saint-Étienne
19:00 CEST (UTC+2)	Cafaro 21'; Chambost 66'; Bamba 73', (yellow card) 81'; Cissokho 89' (o.g.)	Report	Pendant (yellow card) 32'; Bangré 41'; Cissé (yellow card) 70'; Camara 77'; Loric (yellow card) 81'	Stadium: Stade Geoffroy-Guichard; Attendance: 18,528; Referee: Pierre Legat

26 May 2023 37	Quevilly-Rouen	1–3	Amiens	Rouen
20:45 CEST (UTC+2)	Mafouta (penalty scored) 29'; Pierret (yellow card) 76'	Report	Lachuer (yellow card) 31'; Cissé 52', 86'; Leautey 74'	Stadium: Stade Robert Diochon; Attendance: 4,441; Referee: Bastien Dechepy

2 June 2023 38	Niort	3–3	Rouen	Niort
20:45 CEST (UTC+2)	Zemzemi 34'; Sagna 44'; Boutobba 90+3'	Report	Sidibé 45+1', (yellow card) 50'; Bangré 49', 66'	Stadium: Stade René Gaillard; Attendance: 1,759; Referee: Rémi Landry

=== Coupe de France ===
29 October 2022 Seventh round	FCM Aubervilliers	1–1 (4–1 p)	Quevilly-Rouen	Aubervilliers
18:00 CEST	Konate 86'	Report	Bangré 51'	Stadium: Stade André Karman; Attendance: 650; Referee: Samir Zolota
