= 2023–24 US Quevilly-Rouen Métropole season =

US Quevilly-Rouen Métropole
2023–24 season
- Chairman: Michel Mallet
- Manager: Fabien Mercadal
- Stadium: Stade Robert Diochon
- Ligue 2: 18th (relegated)
- Coupe de France: Round of 64

The 2023–24 season was US Quevilly-Rouen Métropole's 122nd season in existence and third consecutive season in the Ligue 2. They also competed in the Coupe de France.

== Players ==
=== First-team squad ===
As of 1 August 2023.

Note: Flags indicate national team as defined under FIFA eligibility rules; some limited exceptions apply. Players may hold more than one non-FIFA nationality.

No.	Pos.	Nation	Player
1	GK	FRA	Benjamin Leroy
4	MF	FRA	Balthazar Pierret
5	DF	FRA	Till Cissokho
6	MF	FRA	Kalidou Sidibé
7	DF	FRA	Jason Pendant
8	MF	FRA	Noah Cadiou
9	FW	SEN	Sambou Soumano (on loan from Lorient)
10	MF	FRA	Alexandre Bonnet
11	FW	CAF	Vénuste Baboula
12	MF	FRA	Garland Gbelle
14	FW	GAB	Alan Do Marcolino (on loan from Rennes)
16	GK	FRA	Kayne Bonnevie

No.	Pos.	Nation	Player
17	MF	BFA	Gustavo Sangaré
20	DF	MLI	Nadjib Cissé
21	DF	BEN	Yohan Roche
22	DF	FRA	Samuel Loric
23	FW	FRA	Logan Delaurier-Chaubet (on loan from Bordeaux)
27	DF	FRA	Damon Bansais
30	GK	FRA	Arsène Courel
58	DF	FRA	Alpha Sissoko
77	FW	SEN	Pape Ousmane Sakho
90	FW	MTN	Pape Ndiaga Yade (on loan from Metz)
93	FW	FRA	Mamadou Camara

=== Out on loan ===
Note: Flags indicate national team as defined under FIFA eligibility rules; some limited exceptions apply. Players may hold more than one non-FIFA nationality.

No.	Pos.	Nation	Player
—	FW	FRA	Isaac Tshipamba (on loan to Avranches)

== Transfers ==
=== In ===
Pos.	Player	Transferred from	Fee	Date	Source

=== Out ===
Pos.	Player	Transferred to	Fee	Date	Source
DF	(France) Syam Ben Youssef	(France) Caen	Free	1 July 2023	

== Pre-season and friendlies ==
29 July 2023 Friendly	Caen	2–2	Quevilly-Rouen	Caen
18:00 UTC+2	Daubin 22'; Mendy 62' (pen.)		Pierret (yellow card) 16'; Baboula 33'; Yadé 84'	Stadium: Terrain Annexe 3 du Venoix; Referee: Benjamin Lepaysan

== Competitions ==
=== Overall record ===
Competition	First match	Last match	Starting round	Final position	Record							
Competition	First match	Last match	Starting round	Final position	Pld	W	D	L	GF	GA	GD	Win %
Ligue 2	5 August 2023	17 May 2024	Matchday 1	18th	38	7	17	14	51	55	−4	18.42
Coupe de France	18 November 2023	5 January 2024	Seventh round	Round of 64	3	2	0	1	7	2	+5	66.67
Total					41	9	17	15	58	57	+1	21.95

Source: Soccerway

=== Ligue 2 ===
==== League table ====
Pos	Team	Pld	W	D	L	GF	GA	GD	Pts	Promotion or Relegation
16	Dunkerque	38	12	10	16	36	52	−16	46	
17	Troyes	38	9	14	15	42	50	−8	41	Spared from relegation
18	Quevilly-Rouen (R)	38	7	17	14	51	55	−4	38	Relegation to National
19	Concarneau (R)	38	10	8	20	39	57	−18	38	Relegation to National
20	Valenciennes (R)	38	6	11	21	26	54	−28	29	Relegation to National

Updated to match(es) played on 17 May 2024. Source: Ligue 2
Rules for classification: 1) Points; 2) Goal difference; 3) Number of goals scored; 4) Head-to-head goal difference; 5) Fair play points
(R) Relegated

==== Results summary ====
Overall								Home						Away					
Pld	W	D	L	GF	GA	GD	Pts	W	D	L	GF	GA	GD	W	D	L	GF	GA	GD
17	3	6	8	23	27	−4	15	2	3	4	11	12	−1	1	3	4	12	15	−3

Last updated: 5 December 2023.
Source: Ligue 2 BKT

==== Results by round ====
Round	1	2	3	4	5	6	7	8	9	10	11	12	13	14	15	16	17
Ground	A	H	A	H	A	H	A	H	A	H	A	H	H	A	H	A	H
Result	L	L	L	D	D	L	L	L	W	D	D	L	W	D	D	L	W
Position	14	18	19	19	19	20	20	20	20								

Updated to match(es) played on 5 December 2023. Source: Ligue 2 BKT
A = Away; H = Home; W = Win; D = Draw; L = Loss

==== Matches ====
The league fixtures were unveiled on 29 June 2023.

5 August 2023 1	Amiens	1–0	Quevilly-Rouen	Amiens
19:00 UTC+2	Ouattara (yellow card) 68'; Touho 90+4'	Report	Pierret (yellow card) 44'	Stadium: Stade François Coty; Attendance: 5,662; Referee: Azzédine Souifi

12 August 2023 2	Quevilly-Rouen	0–1	Ajaccio	Le Petit-Quevilly
19:00 UTC+2	Sangaré (yellow card) 31'; Soumano (yellow card) 73'	Report	Nouri 32'; Marchetti (yellow card) 47'	Stadium: Stade Robert Diochon; Referee: Antoine Valnet

19 August 2023 3	Saint-Étienne	2–1	Quevilly-Rouen	Saint-Étienne
19:00				Stadium: Stade Geoffroy-Guichard

26 August 2023 4	Quevilly-Rouen	0–0	Laval	Le Petit-Quevilly
19:00				Stadium: Stade Robert Diochon

2 September 2023 5	Troyes	2–2	Quevilly-Rouen	Troyes
19:00		Report		Stadium: Stade de l'Aube

16 September 2023 6	Quevilly-Rouen	2–3	Concarneau	Le Petit-Quevilly
19:00		Report		Stadium: Stade Robert Diochon; Attendance: 2,635

23 September 2023 7	Grenoble	2–1	Quevilly-Rouen	Grenoble
19:00		Report		Stadium: Stade des Alpes

26 September 2023 8	Quevilly-Rouen	0–1	Angers	Le Petit-Quevilly
20:45		Report		Stadium: Stade Robert Diochon

30 September 2023 9	Dunkerque	0–1	Quevilly-Rouen	Dunkirk
19:00				Stadium: Stade Marcel-Tribut

7 October 2023 10	Quevilly-Rouen	2–2	Pau	Le Petit-Quevilly
19:00		Report		Stadium: Stade Robert Diochon

21 October 2023 11	Guingamp	2–2	Quevilly-Rouen	Guingamp
19:00		Report		Stadium: Stade de Roudourou; Attendance: 7,594

28 October 2023 12	Quevilly-Rouen	1–2	Annecy	Le Petit-Quevilly
19:00		Report		Stadium: Stade Robert Diochon; Attendance: 2,660

4 November 2023 13	Quevilly-Rouen	3–1	Rodez	Le Petit-Quevilly
19:00				Stadium: Stade Robert Diochon

11 November 2023 14	Caen	3–3	Quevilly-Rouen	Caen
19:00				Stadium: Stade Michel d'Ornano

25 November 2023 15	Quevilly-Rouen	0–0	Valenciennes	Le Petit-Quevilly
19:00				Stadium: Stade Robert Diochon

2 December 2023 16	Auxerre	3–2	Quevilly-Rouen	Auxerre
19:00 CET (UTC+1)		Report		Stadium: Stade de l'Abbé-Deschamps; Attendance: 13,430; Referee: Romain Delpech

5 December 2023 17	Quevilly-Rouen	3–2	Bordeaux	Le Petit-Quevilly
20:45	Soumano 15'; Camara 19'; Coulibaly 55'	Report	Elis 78', 88'	Stadium: Stade Robert Diochon; Referee: Antoine Valnet

16 December 2023 18	Bastia	v	Quevilly-Rouen	Furiani
19:00		Report		Stadium: Stade Armand-Cesari

19 December 2023 19	Paris FC	v	Quevilly-Rouen	Paris
20:45

23 January 2024 21	Angers	v	Quevilly-Rouen	Angers

23 April 2024 34	Quevilly-Rouen	v	Amiens	Le Petit-Quevilly
				Stadium: Stade Robert Diochon

27 April 2024 35	Ajaccio	v	Quevilly-Rouen	Ajaccio

4 May 2024 36	Quevilly-Rouen	v	Dunkerque	Le Petit-Quevilly
				Stadium: Stade Robert Diochon

11 May 2024 37	Valenciennes	v	Quevilly-Rouen	Valenciennes

18 May 2024 38	Quevilly-Rouen	v	Saint-Étienne	Le Petit-Quevilly
				Stadium: Stade Robert Diochon

=== Coupe de France ===
18 November 2023 Seventh round	Montdidier	0–4	Quevilly-Rouen	Amiens
18:30		Report		Stadium: Stade de la Licorne; Referee: Anthony Ustaritz

9 December 2023 Eighth round	Quevilly-Rouen	v	Dijon	Le Petit-Quevilly
15:00				Stadium: Stade Robert Diochon
