= Noah Cadiou =

Footballer (born 1998)

Personal information
- Birth name: Noah Doriann Cadiou
- Date of birth: 26 October 1998 (age 28)
- Place of birth: Lille, France
- Height: 1.91 m (6 ft 3 in)
- Positions: Defensive midfielder; right-back

Team information
- Current team: Lorient
- Number: 8

Youth career
- –2017: Olympique Marcquois

Senior career*
Years	Team	Apps	(Gls)
2017–2019	Olympique Marcquois	25+ (Note: Statistics unknown for the 2017–18 season.)	(0+)
2019	Boulogne B	5	(0)
2019–2021	Boulogne	42	(4)
2021–2023	Red Star	41	(2)
2023–2024	Quevilly-Rouen	37	(2)
2024–2025	Rodez	30	(5)
2025–	Lorient	28	(3)

International career^{‡}
2024–	Guadeloupe	5	(0)
- * Club domestic league appearances and goals as of 19 May 2026 ‡ National team caps and goals as of 20 June 2025

Noah Doriann Cadiou (born 26 October 1998) is a professional footballer who plays as a defensive midfielder and right-back for Ligue 1 club Lorient. Born in metropolitan France, he plays for the Guadeloupe national team.

== Career ==
For his performances in the 2018–19 Championnat National 3 season with Olympique Marcquois, Cadiou was described as a "revelation". In 2019, he joined Championnat National side Boulogne, becoming an undisputed starter by the 2020–21 season. He joined Red Star in 2021, also playing in the Championnat National. On 15 June 2023, Cadiou signed for Ligue 2 club Quevilly-Rouen on a two-year contract.

On 4 July 2025, Cadiou signed a four-year contract with Lorient in Ligue 1.

== International career ==
Cadiou was called up to the Guadeloupe national team for a set of CONCACAF Nations League matches in November 2024.

== Career statistics ==
As of match played on 1 March 2025

Appearances and goals by club, season, and competition
Club	Season	League			Cup		Other		Total	
Club	Season	Division	Apps	Goals	Apps	Goals	Apps	Goals	Apps	Goals
Olympique Marcquois	2018–19	Championnat National 3	25	0	1	0	—		26	0
Boulogne B	2019–20	Championnat National 3	5	0	—		—		5	0
Boulogne	2019–20	Championnat National	15	3	1	0	—		16	3
Boulogne	2020–21	Championnat National	27	1	3	0	—		30	1
Boulogne	Total		42	4	4	0	—		46	4
Red Star	2021–22	Championnat National	19	0	3	0	—		22	0
Red Star	2022–23	Championnat National	22	2	0	0	—		22	2
Red Star	Total		41	2	3	0	—		44	2
Quevilly-Rouen	2023–24	Ligue 2	35	1	2	0	—		37	1
Quevilly-Rouen	2024–25	Championnat National	2	1	0	0	—		2	1
Quevilly-Rouen	Total		37	2	0	0	—		39	2
Rodez	2024–25	Ligue 2	22	5	1	0	—		23	5
Career totals			172	13	11	0	—		183	13

== Personal life ==
Noah's father Frédéric is a former professional footballer. He is of Guadeloupean descent.
