= FC Rouen =

French football club, based in Rouen

- Full name: Football Club de Rouen 1899
- Nickname: Les Diables Rouges (The Red Devils)
- Founded: 1899; 127 years ago
- Ground: Stade Robert Diochon, Rouen
- Capacity: 12,018
- President: Iwan Postel
- Head Coach: Régis Brouard
- League: Ligue 3
- 2025–26: Championnat National, 3rd of 17
- Website: fcr1899.com
Home colours	Away colours	Third colours

Football Club de Rouen 1899 (French pronunciation: [ʁwɑ̃]; commonly referred to as simply FC Rouen) is a French association football club based in Rouen, Normandy. The club was formed in 1899 and currently plays in Ligue 3, the third level of French football. Rouen plays its home matches at the Stade Robert Diochon; named after Robert Diochon, a historic player who was influential during the club's infancy. Rouen is known as Les Diables Rouges (The Red Devils) and have been since 1903.

Rouen's football division was founded in 1899, but the club itself was founded in 1896 as a rugby club. The club achieved professional status in 1933 and have spent 19 seasons in the first division of French football and 36 in the second division. Rouen's highest honour to date was winning the second division in 1936. In 1940 and 1945, the club won the league championship of France, however, due to the league being run during World War II and not under French Football Federation authority, the titles are unofficial. Rouen have also reached European level, competing in the 1969–70 edition of the Inter-Cities Fairs Cup, where the team was defeated by the eventual champions Arsenal 1–0 on aggregate in the third round.

In addition to Robert Diochon, Rouen have produced a host of players who contributed to the France national team during the team's early years. Edmond Delfour made 41 appearances with the national team from 1929 to 1938 and participated in three FIFA World Cups: 1930, 1934 and 1938. He is one of five players to have appeared in all three of the pre-war World Cups. Delfour later went on to manage Rouen from 1940 to 1945 during the unofficial wartime championships. Jean Nicolas spent his entire career with Rouen and appeared in 25 matches, scoring 21 goals with the national team from 1933 to 1938. In the present day, Nicolas' goal output with the team ranks for tenth all-time and his average places him in a tie for third.

== History ==
Football Club de Rouen 1899 was founded under the name Football Club de Rouen in 1896 by an English merchant known by the surname Willing. The club was initially formed as a rugby club. Rouen spent three seasons primarily playing the sport of rugby before association football was introduced to the club in 1899. On 11 July 1899, the club officially announced the introduction of a football section. The section, primarily influenced by player Robert Diochon was, upon its creation, inserted into the regional league, Normandie Championnat, by the USFSA. In 1903, the club acquired the nickname Les Diables Rouges (The Red Devils). In 1910, Diochon was installed as president of the club. Under the reign of Diochon, Rouen won the Normandie Championnat in five straight seasons from 1909 to 1914. After World War I and the dissolving of the USFSA, Rouen began playing in the Normandie Division d'Honneur. From 1919 to 1933, the club won the league eight times and were led by mercurial striker Jean Nicolas. In 1925, Rouen reached the Coupe de France final. In the final, the club faced CASG Paris and were defeated 3–2 in the replay of the final. The first leg had ended in a 1–1 draw, which caused the replay.

In July 1930, the National Council of the French Football Federation voted 128–20 in support of professionalism in French football. Rouen were among several clubs to adopt the new statute and, subsequently, became professional. The club was inserted into the second division and, as a result, became founding members of Division 2. In the league's inaugural season, Rouen finished 3rd. In the league's second season, the club finished as champions, thus earning promotion to Division 1. In Rouen's debut season in Division 1, the club surprisingly finished in 4th place. The club also reached the semi-finals of that year's Coupe de France. Rouen remained in Division 1 until the onset of World War II stopped the competition. After the war, professional football returned and Rouen were back in Division 1. The club spent only two seasons in the league before falling to Division 2 after finishing last in the 1946–47 season. Rouen spent the next 13 seasons playing in the second division. In 1953, Diochon died and the presidency was handed over to Auguste Duchêne. Under Duchêne, Rouen returned to Division 1 in 1960 and finished in 4th place in the club's first season back. Rouen remained consistent in the table for the next two seasons before falling down to the bottom half of the table in 1963. After finishing in the bottom half for five straight seasons, Rouen were forced into relegation by the French Football Federation after the club gave up its professional status due to financial and administrative issues.

Aside from a three-year stint in Division 1 from 1982 to 1985, Rouen have not maintain a consistent place in the first division since giving up its professional status. From 1970 to 1994, the club spent most of its life playing in Division 2. In 1995, the club filed for bankruptcy and subsequently changed its name to Grand FC Rouen. As a result of its bankruptcy filing, the club was administratively relegated to the Championnat National, the third level of football. In 1997, Rouen were relegated to the Championnat de France amateur and, in the next season, were playing in the fifth division. In 1999, Rouen, as an amateur club, reached the quarter-finals of the Coupe de France.

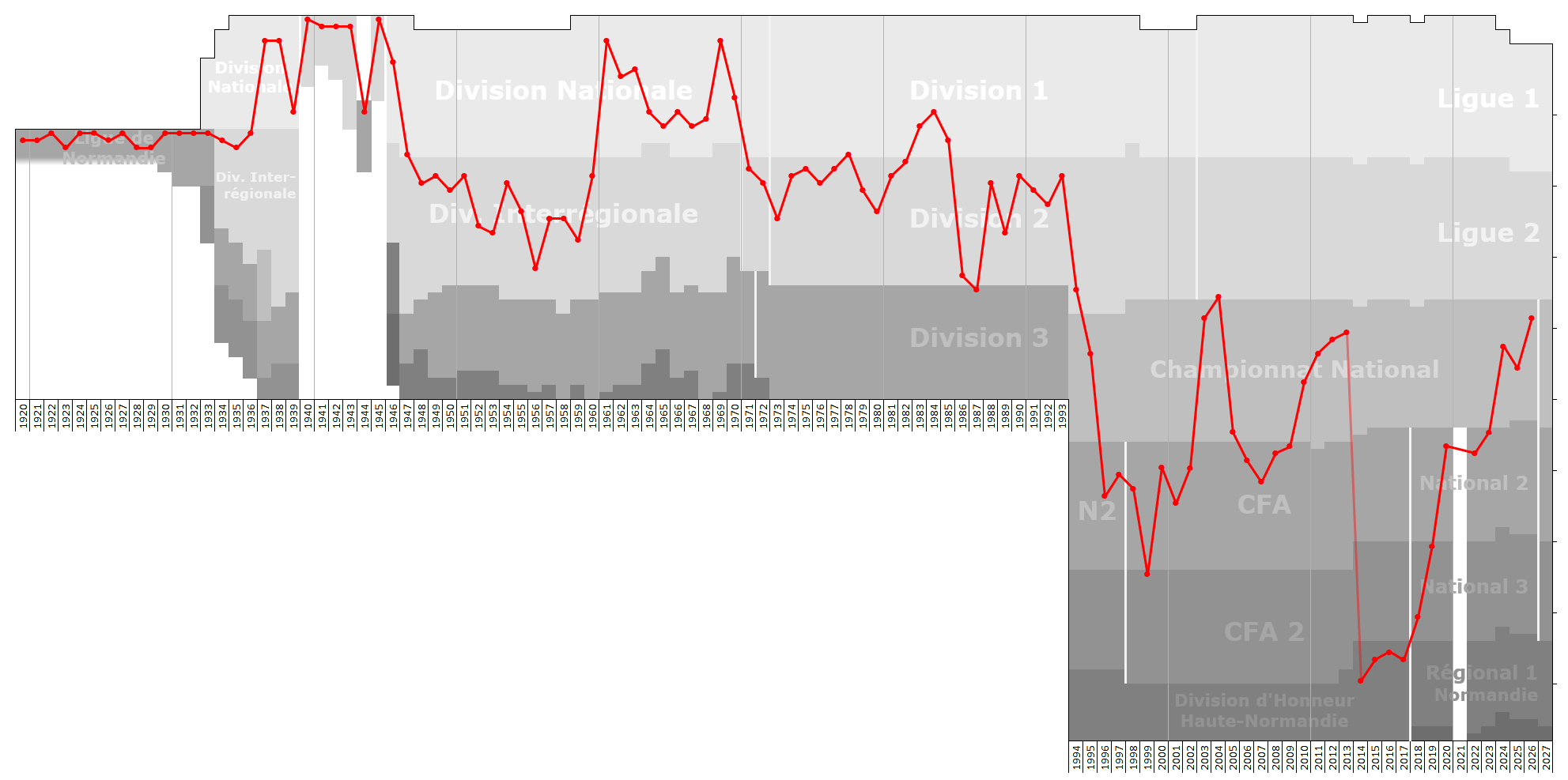
Historical league performance chart of FC Rouen

In July 2000, the club's new incoming president René Bertin changed the club's name to its current form. The club underwent a rebirth and, after three seasons, were back playing in the National division. In the 2002–03 season, Rouen finished 3rd in National and, as a result, earned promotion back to Division 2, now called Ligue 2. The club's return as a professional outfit was short as Rouen spent a disastrous season in the league, ultimately finishing in last. An ensuing relegation from National occurred in the following season and Rouen were back in the fourth division. In 2008, the club endured serious financial issues, which led to the club being relegated to the Championnat de France amateur 2 by the DNCG. However, after successfully appealing to the organisation, Rouen were inserted back into the fourth division. The club, subsequently, finished first in its group and were promoted back to National.

In the 2012–13 season, Rouen placed 5th in Championnat National, but they were relegated to the sixth division, Division d'Honneur, due to severe financial trouble of their management company.

In April 2015, US Quevilly joined with FC Rouen to form US Quevilly-Rouen Métropole, taking the place of US Quevilly in the Championnat de France Amateur for the 2015–16 season. This was not a straight merger, as FC Rouen continued to exist as separate entity with its own teams, whilst the new joint entity incorporated the colours and crest of FC Rouen into its kits and crest.

In 2017, FC Rouen were promoted from the Division d'Honneur Normandy to play in Championnat National 3. In the 2017–18 season, Rouen ensured their survival in National 3 on the final day. In June 2018, FC Rouen ended their arrangement with US Quevilly-Rouen Métropole. The following season, in 2019, they won promotion to Championnat National 2. In the 2022–23 season, Rouen gained promotion to the Championnat National.

On 21 January 2024, FC Rouen defeated defending Coupe de France champions Toulouse 12–11 on penalties after the match finished 3–3 after extra-time to book their place in the round of 16 against AS Monaco. After a 1–1 game, they similarly defeated Monaco on penalties, earning a spot in the quarterfinals for the first time in 25 years. On 29 February 2024, Rouen played against Valenciennes in the Coupe de France quarter-finals. Rouen's run in the competition would end after losing 4–2 on penalties. The two teams could not be separated at the end of 120 minutes with the game finishing 1–1.

== Players ==
=== Squad ===
As of 6 September 2026

Note: Flags indicate national team as defined under FIFA eligibility rules; some limited exceptions apply. Players may hold more than one non-FIFA nationality.

No.	Pos.	Nation	Player
1	GK	FRA	Axel Maraval
3	DF	MTQ	Melvin Borne
5	DF	ANG	Jordy Gaspar
7	FW	FRA	Valentin Fuss
8	MF	FRA	Guiry Egny
9	FW	FRA	Malik Tchokounté
10	FW	FRA	Issiaka Karamoko
11	MF	FRA	Noé Sommer
12	MF	CIV	Amara Touré
13	MF	MTN	Bakari Camara
15	DF	FRA	Zakary Lamgahez

No.	Pos.	Nation	Player
16	GK	FRA	Thomas Sanglier
17	MF	FRA	Ibrahima Samoura
18	DF	FRA	Clément Bassin
19	FW	FRA	Lisandru Tramoni
21	FW	FRA	Sory Traoré
22	DF	GBS	Formose Mendy
25	MF	FRA	Salim Diaby
26	FW	FRA	Marvin Gakpa
28	FW	HAI	Woobens Pacius
29	FW	FRA	Joël Viana
30	GK	FRA	Didier Desprez

=== Notable players ===
Below are the notable former players who have represented Rouen in league and international competition since the club's foundation in 1899. To appear in the section below, a player must have played in at least 80 official matches for the club.

For a complete list of Rouen players, see Category:FC Rouen players

- (France) Bernard Antoinette
- (Senegal) Demba Ba
- (France) André Betta
- (France) Michel Bensoussan
- (France) Jean-François Beltramini
- (Denmark) Jens Jørn Bertelsen
- (France) Maurice Blondel
- (France) Jean-Luc Buisine
- (France) Jacques Canthelou
- (France) Alfred Dambach
- (France) Edmond Delfour
- (France) Jean-Pierre Destrumelle
- (France) Robert Diochon
- (France) Daniel Druda
- (France) Christian Gourcuff
- (France) Christophe Horlaville
- (France) Albert Lemaître
- (Algeria) Mohamed Lekkak
- (France) Claude Le Roy
- (France) William Louiron
- (Croatia) Dado Pršo
- (France) André Mathieu
- (Serbia) Bora Milutinović
- (France) Jean Nicolas
- (France) Didier Notheaux
- (France) Jean-Pierre Orts
- (France) Michel Payen
- (France) Pierre Phelipon
- (France) Roger Rio
- (France) Philippe Troussier
- (Argentina) Jorge Trezeguet
- (Iceland) Þórólfur Beck

== Management and coaching ==
=== Club officials ===
Football Club de Rouen 1899

- President: Fabrice Tardy
- Vice-president: Stéphane Leroux

Coaching and medical staff

- Manager: Régis Brouard
- Assistant manager: Grégory Auger
- Goalkeeping coach: Alexandre Lerond
- Intendant: Ali Mathlouti

=== Managerial history ===
Dates	Name
1930–1935	Zoltan Vago
1935–1938	Emil Skolaut
1938–1939	William Wright
1939–1940	George Kimpton
1940–1945	Edmond Delfour
1945	George Kimpton
1945–1947	Ernest Payne
1947–1950	Maurice Blondel
1950	Charles Roze
1950–1952	José Mandaluniz
1952–1953	Jules Bigot
1953–1954	Jean Grégoire
1954–1958	Robert Lacoste
1958–1964	Max Schirschin
1966–1965	Paul Lévin
1965–1968	René Vernier
1968–1970	André Gérard
1970–1971	Roger Rizzi
1971	Pierre Tournier
1971–1972	Max Schirschin
1972–1975	Ernst Melchior
1975–1976	Robert Vicot
1976–1977	Pancho Gonzales
1977–1978	Milorad Pavić
1978–1979	Daniel Druda
1979–1980	Cesto Vanzo

Dates	Name
1980–1985	Robert Vicot
1985–1986	François Bracci
1986–1990	Arnaud Dos Santos
1990	Pierre Garcia
1990–1994	Daniel Zorzetto
1994	Jean-Pierre Orts
1994	Jean-Paul Rabier
1994–1995	Patrick Parizon
1995–2000	Laurent Roussey
2000	Parice Heaulmé
2000–2004	Yves Brécheteau
2004	Jean-Guy Wallemme
2004–2005	Eric Dewilder
2005–2006	Alain Michel
2006–2012	Éric Garcin
2012	Emmanuel da Costa
2012–2013	Didier Ollé-Nicolle
2013–2014	Hakli Dahmane & Eric Rastell
2014–2017	Romain Djoubri
2017–2018	Manuel Abreu
2018	Raynald Bertin
2018	David Fouquet
2019–2021	David Giguel
2021	Arnaud Margueritte; Sarafoulé Mendy
2021–2024	Maxime D'Ornano
2024–	Régis Brouard

== Honours ==
- Division 1: 1944–45 (unofficial)
- Division 2: 1935–36
- Championnat National 2: 2008–09, 2022–23
- Coupe de France runners-up: 1924–25
- Coupe de la Ligue runners-up: 1963–64
- Division d'Honneur (Normandy): 1921–22, 1923–24, 1926–27, 1929–30, 1930–31, 1931–32, 1932–33
- USFSA Normandy League: 1910, 1911, 1912, 1913, 1914
