= Hôtel de Ville, Le Petit-Quevilly =

Town hall in Le Petit-Quevilly, France

Hôtel de Ville
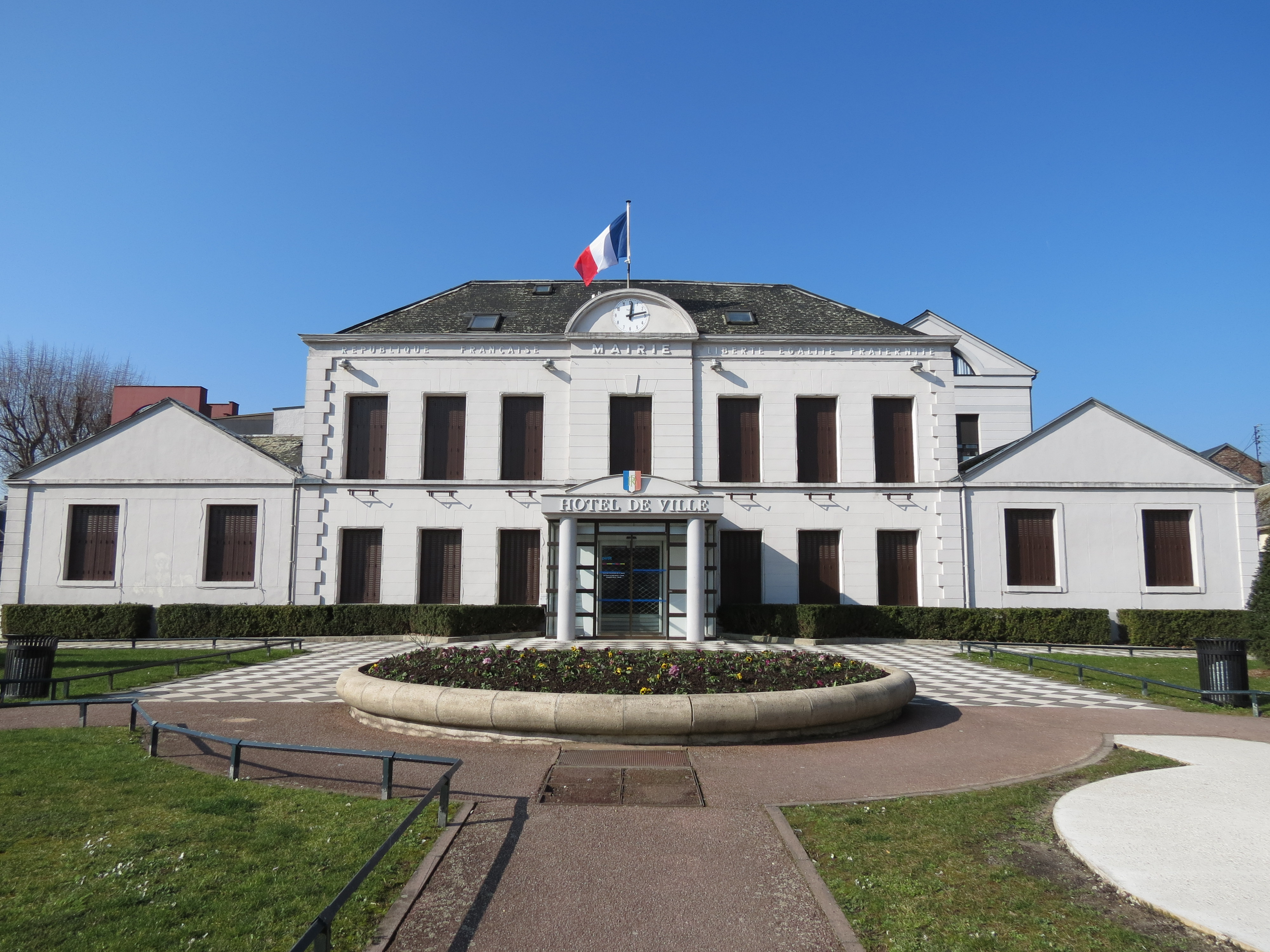
- The main frontage of the Hôtel de Ville in February 2018
- Interactive map of the Hôtel de Ville area

General information
- Type: City hall
- Architectural style: Neoclassical style
- Location: Le Petit-Quevilly, France
- Coordinates: 49.4303°N 1.0527°E
- Completed: 1846

Design and construction
- Architect: Sieur Maillard

The Hôtel de Ville (French pronunciation: [otɛl də vil], City Hall) is a municipal building in Le Petit-Quevilly, Seine-Maritime, in northern France, standing on Place Henri-Barbusse.

== History ==
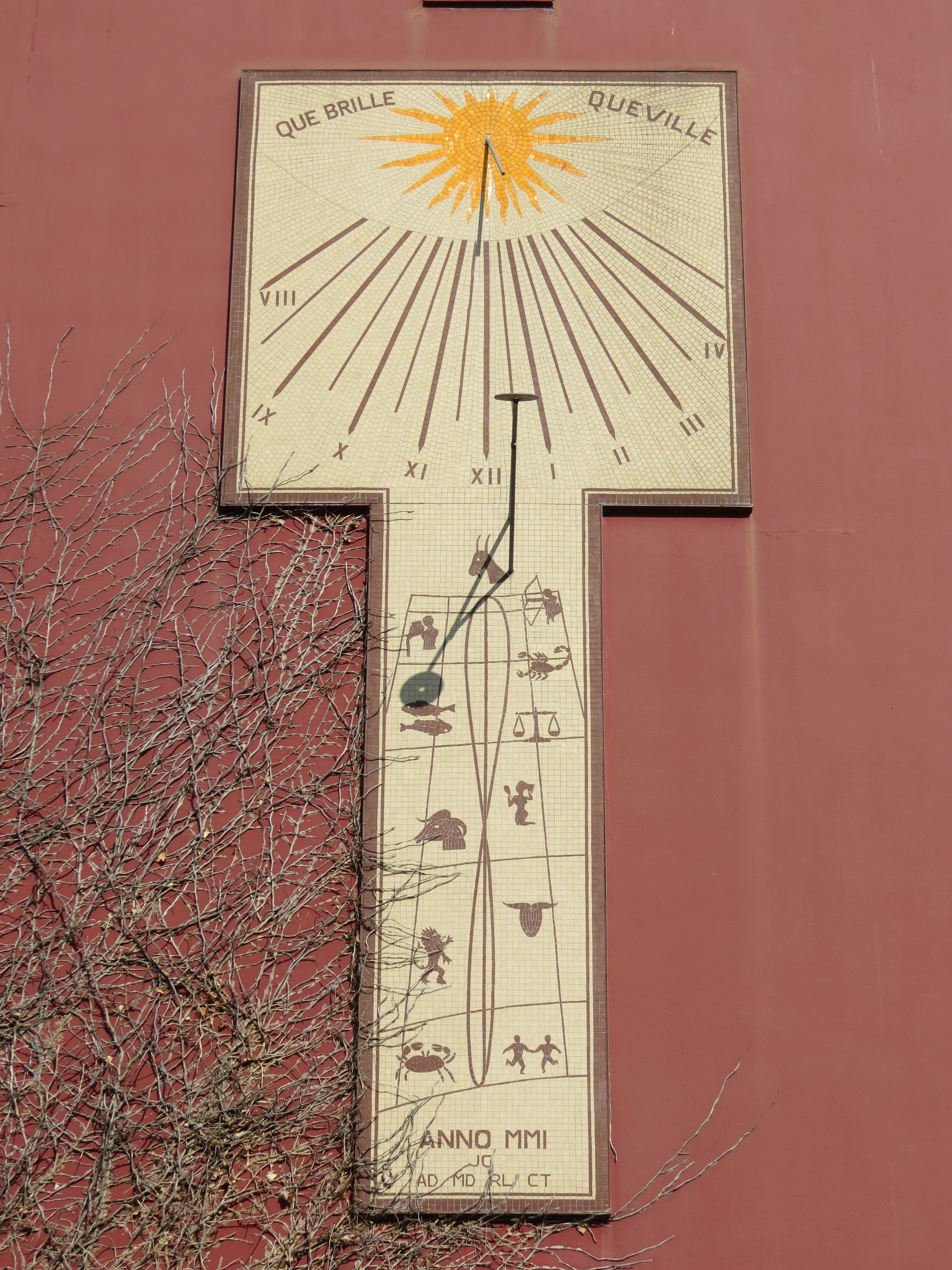
Sun dial on the south side of the building

Following the French Revolution, the new town council initially met in a building on Rue de la Mare which faced the Church of Sainte-Pierre. In the first half of the 19th century, the commune experienced rapid industrial expansion associated first with a chemical business founded by Pierre Malétra, in 1808, and then with a flax mill, which was initially powered by a steam engine recovered from a tugboat La Foudre, in 1835.

In this context, the council led by the mayor, Louis-Désiré Calenge, decided to commission a dedicated town hall. The site they selected was on the south side of Rue Jacquard some 300 metres (980 ft) to the southeast of the original building. The new building was designed by Sieur Maillard in the neoclassical style, built in ashlar stone at a cost of FFr10,700 and was completed in 1846.

The building was laid out with a two-storey main block, which was flanked by a pair of single storey pavilions. The southern pavilion was originally allocated for use by the justice of the peace court, while the northern pavilion was used as a school. The design of the main block involved a symmetrical main frontage of seven bays facing onto what is now Place Henri-Barbusse. The central bay, which was slightly projected forward, featured a square-headed doorway with an entablature and a segmental pediment. There was a casement window on the first floor and a larger segmental pediment above. Behind the pediment, there was originally a small lantern. The other bays were fenestrated by casement windows on both floors. Internally, the principal room was the Salle du Conseil (council chamber).

In 1877, the area in front of the building, now the Place Henri-Barbusse, became the terminus of the horse drawn tramway between the commune and central Rouen. Later improvements to the front of the building included a small portico formed by a pair of columns supporting an entablature and a pediment, while extensive additions at the rear of the building included a section on the south side, which was decorated with a sundial, installed in 2001, with a gnomon and hour lines, an analemmic curve and various zodiac symbols.
