= Justin Smith (soccer) =

Soccer player (born 2003)

Personal information
- Date of birth: February 4, 2003 (age 23)
- Place of birth: Paris, France
- Height: 1.88 m (6 ft 2 in)
- Position: Defensive midfielder

Team information
- Current team: Eldense

Youth career
- –2017: Voisins FC
- 2017–2019: Paris Saint-Germain
- 2019–2021: OGC Nice

Senior career*
Years	Team	Apps	(Gls)
2021–2024	Nice II	17	(0)
2022–2023	→ Quevilly-Rouen II (loan)	14	(1)
2022–2023	→ Quevilly-Rouen (loan)	6	(0)
2023–2024	→ Avranches (loan)	30	(0)
2024–2025	Espanyol B	25	(1)
2024–2026	Espanyol	5	(0)
2025–2026	→ Sporting Gijón (loan)	34	(0)
2026–	Eldense	12	(1)

International career^{‡}
2022	Canada U20	6	(0)
2026–	Canada	1	(0)
- * Club domestic league appearances and goals as of November 15, 2026 ‡ National team caps and goals as of October 3, 2026

Justin Smith (born February 4, 2003) is a soccer player who plays as a defensive midfielder for Segunda División club Eldense. Born in France, he represents the Canada national team.

== Early life ==
Born in France to Canadian parents, Smith holds French and Canadian nationalities. He began playing soccer at age seven with Voisins FC. After his U14 season, he departed Voisins and joined the Paris Saint-Germain Academy, where he played until the U17 level. In 2019, he joined the Nice youth system. At the Tournoi National U17 de QRM, he helped Nice finish fourth, being named the second best player of the tournament.

== Club career ==
=== Nice ===
In June 2021, he signed his first professional contract with Nice. After featuring extensively in their preseason, during the 2021–22 season, he played with Nice II in the fifth-tier Championnat National 3. On August 14, he was called up to the first team for the first time, for a match against Lille, where he was an unused substitute. That season, he featured as an unused substitute for the first team in ten Ligue 1 matches and one Coupe de France match, but did not make an appearance.

On July 1, 2022, he joined Ligue 2 side Quevilly-Rouen on loan for the season. He debuted for the second team in the Championnat National 3, scoring a goal in the team's first game of the season on August 28 against SU Dives-Cabourg. Smith made his first league appearance for the first team against Guingamp on February 3, 2023.

In July 2023, he was loaned to third tier Championnat National side Avranches on a year-long loan. The loan deal does not contain a purchase option.

=== Espanyol ===
In July 2024, he joined Spanish club Espanyol B in the Segunda Federación on a transfer. He scored his first goal on September 22 against Alzira. On November 3, he made his first team debut in La Liga, in a substitute appearance against Barcelona.

==== Loan to Sporting Gijón ====
On July 17, 2025, Smith renewed his contract with Espanyol until 2027, and was immediately loaned to Segunda División side Sporting Gijón, for one year.

=== Eldense ===
On July 8, 2026, Smith signed a three-year contract with Eldense, newly promoted to the second division.

== International career ==
In April 2022, Smith accepted a call-up to a Canada U20 camp ahead of two friendlies against Costa Rica. In June 2022, he was named to the roster for the 2022 CONCACAF U-20 Championship. Smith served as team captain during the tournament, appearing in all four of the team's matches.

On February 26, 2024, Smith was named to the Canada national soccer team provisional roster for the 2024 Copa América qualifying play-offs against Trinidad and Tobago. In September 2026, he received his first call-up to the senior team, for a series of friendlies. On October 3, 2026, he made his senior national team debut, playing the last 30 minutes against Peru.

== Career statistics ==
=== Club ===
As of match played November 15, 2026

Appearances and goals by club, season and competition
Club	Season	League			National cup		Continental		Total	
Club	Season	Division	Apps	Goals	Apps	Goals	Apps	Goals	Apps	Goals
Nice II	2021–22	Championnat National 3	17	0	—		—		17	0
Quevilly-Rouen II (loan)	2022–23	Championnat National 3	14	1	—		—		14	1
Quevilly-Rouen (loan)	2022–23	Ligue 2	6	0	0	0	—		6	0
Avranches (loan)	2023–24	Championnat National	30	0	1	0	—		31	0
Espanyol B	2024–25	Segunda Federación	18	1	—		—		18	1
Espanyol	2024–25	La Liga	5	0	1	0	—		6	0
Sporting Gijón (loan)	2025–26	Segunda División	34	0	2	0	—		36	0
Eldense	2026–27	Segunda División	12	1	1	0	—		13	1
Career total			136	2	5	0	0	0	141	2

=== International ===
As of match played October 3, 2026

Appearances and goals by national team and year
National team	Year	Apps	Goals
Canada	2026	1	0
Total		1	0
