= Mamadou Camara (footballer, born 7 February 2001) =

French footballer

Personal information
- Date of birth: 7 February 2001 (age 25)
- Place of birth: Aubervilliers, France
- Height: 1.89 m (6 ft 2 in)
- Position: Forward

Team information
- Current team: Montpellier
- Number: 11

Senior career*
| Years | Team | Apps | (Gls) |
| 2018–2022 | Troyes II | 60 | (18) |
| 2021–2022 | Troyes | 3 | (0) |
| 2022 | Quevilly-Rouen II | 3 | (1) |
| 2022–2024 | Quevilly-Rouen | 72 | (10) |
| 2024–2026 | Laval | 57 | (14) |
| 2026– | Montpellier | 0 | (0) |

International career^{‡}
| 2025– | Mali | 6 | (1) |
- * Club domestic league appearances and goals as of 12 May 2026 ‡ National team caps and goals as of 13 November 2026

Mamadou Camara (born 7 February 2001) is a professional footballer who plays as a forward for Ligue 2 club Montpellier. Born in France, he plays for the Mali national team.

== Career ==
Camara made his professional debut with Troyes in a 1–0 Coupe de France loss to Auxerre on 19 January 2021. He signed his first professional contract with the club on 7 July 2021.

On 21 July 2022, Camara signed a three-year contract with Quevilly-Rouen.

On 16 July 2026, Camara joined Montpellier in Ligue 2 on a four-year deal.

== International career ==
Born in France, Camara is of Malian descent. In March 2025, he was called up to the Mali national team for a set of 2026 FIFA World Cup qualification matches.

On 11 December 2025, Camara was called up to the Mali squad for the 2025 Africa Cup of Nations.

== Career statistics ==
=== Club ===
As of match played 20 March 2026

Appearances and goals by club, season and competition
| Club | Season | League | | | Coupe de France | | Other | | Total | |
| Club | Season | Division | Apps | Goals | Apps | Goals | Apps | Goals | Apps | Goals |
|---|---|---|---|---|---|---|---|---|---|---|
| Troyes II | 2017–18 | Championnat National 3 | 2 | 1 | – | | – | | 2 | 1 |
| Troyes II | 2018–19 | Championnat National 3 | 17 | 2 | – | | – | | 17 | 2 |
| Troyes II | 2019–20 | Championnat National 3 | 16 | 6 | – | | – | | 16 | 6 |
| Troyes II | 2020–21 | Championnat National 3 | 6 | 2 | – | | – | | 6 | 2 |
| Troyes II | 2021–22 | Championnat National 3 | 19 | 7 | – | | – | | 19 | 7 |
| Troyes II | Total | | 60 | 11 | – | | – | | 60 | 11 |
| Troyes | 2020–21 | Ligue 1 | 0 | 0 | 1 | 0 | – | | 1 | 0 |
| Troyes | 2021–22 | Ligue 1 | 3 | 0 | 0 | 0 | – | | 3 | 0 |
| Troyes | Total | | 3 | 0 | 1 | 0 | – | | 4 | 0 |
| Quevilly-Rouen II | 2022–23 | Championnat National 3 | 3 | 1 | – | | – | | 3 | 1 |
| Quevilly-Rouen | 2022–23 | Ligue 2 | 34 | 3 | 1 | 0 | – | | 35 | 3 |
| Quevilly-Rouen | 2023–24 | Ligue 2 | 36 | 6 | 2 | 2 | – | | 38 | 8 |
| Quevilly-Rouen | 2024–25 | Ligue 2 | 2 | 1 | – | | – | | 2 | 1 |
| Quevilly-Rouen | Total | | 72 | 10 | 3 | 2 | – | | 75 | 12 |
| Laval | 2024–25 | Ligue 1 | 28 | 5 | 3 | 1 | – | | 31 | 6 |
| Laval | 2025–26 | Ligue 2 | 23 | 6 | 2 | 0 | – | | 25 | 6 |
| Laval | Total | | 51 | 11 | 5 | 1 | – | | 56 | 12 |
| Career total | | | 189 | 33 | 9 | 3 | 0 | 0 | 198 | 36 |

=== International ===
As of match played 13 November 2026

Appearances and goals by national team and year
| National team | Year | Apps | Goals |
|---|---|---|---|
| Mali | 2025 | 4 | 0 |
| Mali | 2026 | 2 | 1 |
| Total | | 6 | 1 |

As of match played 13 November 2026
Scores and results list Mali's goal tally first, score column indicates score after each Camara goal.

List of international goals scored by Mamadou Camara
| No. | Date | Venue | Opponent | Score | Result | Competition |
|---|---|---|---|---|---|---|
| 1 | 13 November 2026 | 26 March Stadium, Bamako, Mali | Rwanda | 3–2 | 3–2 | 2027 Africa Cup of Nations qualification |
