= Robert Diochon =

French footballer and sports leader (1883–1953)

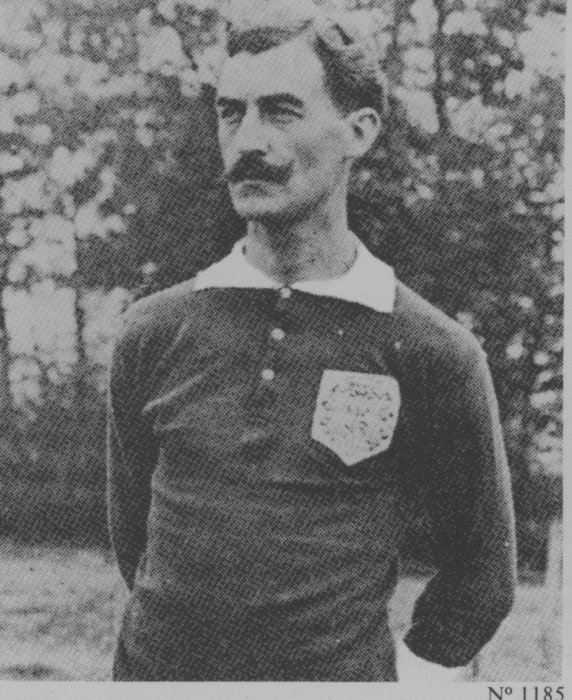
- Diochon circa 1910

Personal information
- Full name: Robert Gabriel Diochon
- Date of birth: 9 June 1883
- Place of birth: Fougères, Ille-et-Vilaine, France
- Date of death: 14 September 1953 (aged 70)
- Place of death: Rouen, France

Senior career*
Years	Team	Apps	(Gls)
1899–1912	FC Rouen		

International career
1911	France (UIAFA)	0	(0)
President of FC Rouen
In office 1906–1907
Preceded by	Maurice Cousinard
Succeeded by	Maurice Cousinard
President of FC Rouen
In office 1908–1953
Preceded by	Maurice Cousinard
Succeeded by	Auguste Duchêne
- * Club domestic league appearances and goals

Robert Gabriel Diochon (9 June 1883 – 14 September 1953) was a French footballer who is widely regarded as one of the most important figures of FC Rouen, being one of its co-founders in 1899, and then serving the club as a player, captain, and as its president from 1906 to 1907, and from 1908 to 1953. The club's stadium now bears his name.

== Early and personal life ==
Robert Diochon was born on 9 June 1883 in Fougères, Ille-et-Vilaine, as the fourth child and third son of Louis Diochon (1844–1907) and Aline Gabrielle Chenet (1850–?).

On 22 March 1939, Diochon married Marguerite Marie Dantu in Rouen.

== Playing career ==
In 1899, the 16-year-old Diochon was one of the co-founders of FC Rouen, then under the name of FC Rouennais, which he then served as captain. In 1911, the 28-year-old Diochon was initially listed as a member of the French squad that participated in the 1911 UIAFA European Football Tournament at Roubaix, but he ended up not even traveling there.

During the First World War, Diochon was mobilized in the 160th Infantry Regiment, being later moved to the 11th Artillery Regiment and then to the 84th Artillery Regiment.

== President of Rouen ==
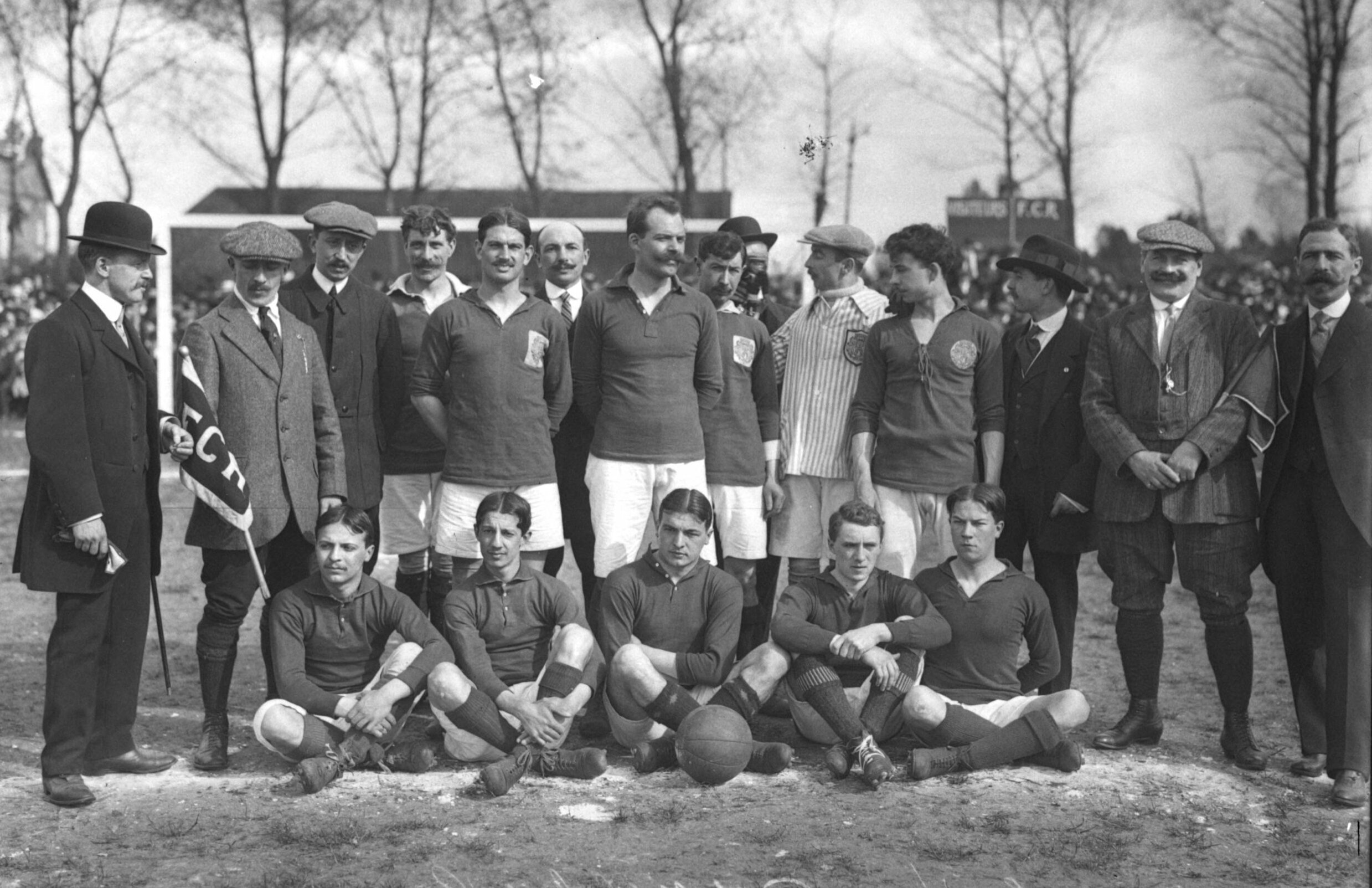
Diochon (first from left) in 1913.

As the captain, Diochon took over the club's presidency in 1906, but in the following year, he was replaced by goalkeeper Maurice Cousinard, but he then returned to the presidency in January 1908, a position that he held for 45 years, until he died in 1953. In 1932, the club was invited to participate in the inaugural edition of the French professional championship, but President Diochon declined the invitation on 14 March 1932 because he viewed this development with suspicion.

Under his leadership, Rouen became a professional club in 1934, and then achieved promotion to the First Division in 1936.

== Death ==
Diochon died in Rouen on 14 September 1953, at the age of 70. Following his death, the Stade des Bruyères, where FC Rouen had played since 1913, was renamed as Stade Robert-Diochon in his honor.
