= Mamady Bangré =

Footballer (born 2001)

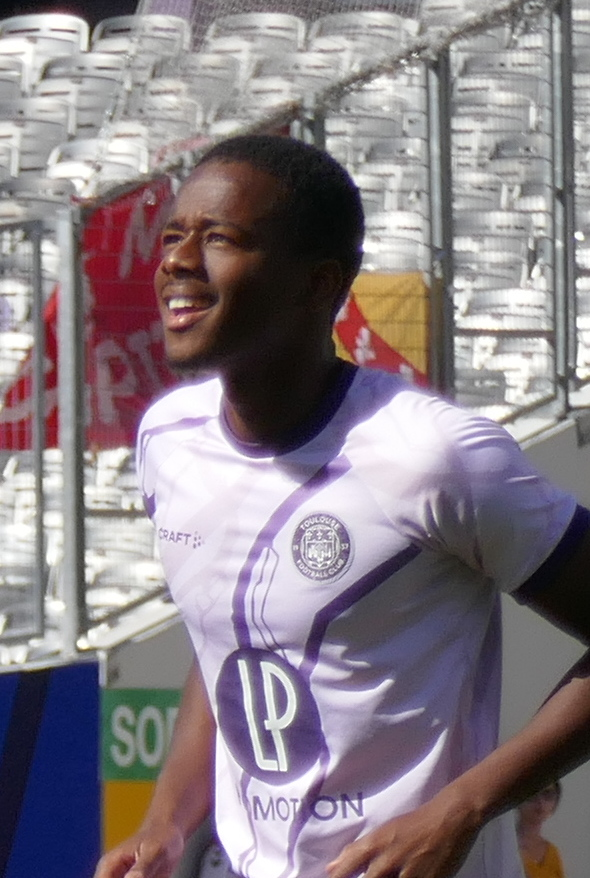
- Bangré with Toulouse in 2023

Personal information
- Full name: Mamady Alex Bangré
- Date of birth: 15 June 2001 (age 25)
- Place of birth: Toulouse, France
- Height: 1.71 m (5 ft 7 in)
- Position: Winger

Team information
- Current team: Grenoble
- Number: 11

Youth career
- 2007–2018: Toulouse

Senior career*
Years	Team	Apps	(Gls)
2018–2022	Toulouse B	32	(8)
2021–2024	Toulouse	17	(1)
2022–2023	→ Quevilly-Rouen (loan)	37	(9)
2024	→ Troyes (loan)	13	(0)
2024–	Grenoble	37	(1)
2025	→ Pau (loan)	10	(1)

International career^{‡}
2022–	Burkina Faso	9	(0)
- * Club domestic league appearances and goals as of 12 May 2026 ‡ National team caps and goals as of 20:54, 27 May 2022 (UTC)

Mamady Alex Bangré (born 15 June 2001) is a professional footballer who plays as a winger for Ligue 2 club Grenoble. Born in France, he plays for the Burkina Faso national team.

== Club career ==
Bangré joined the youth academy of Toulouse at the age of 6. On 10 April 2021, he signed his first professional contract with Toulouse. He made his professional debut with the team in a 1–0 Ligue 2 win over Châteauroux on 10 April 2021.

On 27 June 2022, Bangré joined Quevilly-Rouen on a season-long loan.

On 26 August 2024, Bangré signed for Ligue 2 club Grenoble on a three-year contract. On 3 February 2025, he was loaned to Pau in the same league.

== International career ==
Born in France, Bangré holds French and Burkinabé nationalities. He debuted with the Burkina Faso national team in a friendly 5–0 loss to Kosovo on 24 March 2022.

== Personal life ==
Bangré's brother, Cheikh, is a semi-pro footballer who also came out of Toulouse's academy.

== Honours ==
Toulouse

- Ligue 2: 2021–22
