= Stade Robert Diochon =

Sports stadium in Seine-Maritime, France

Coordinates: 49°24′40″N 1°04′15″E

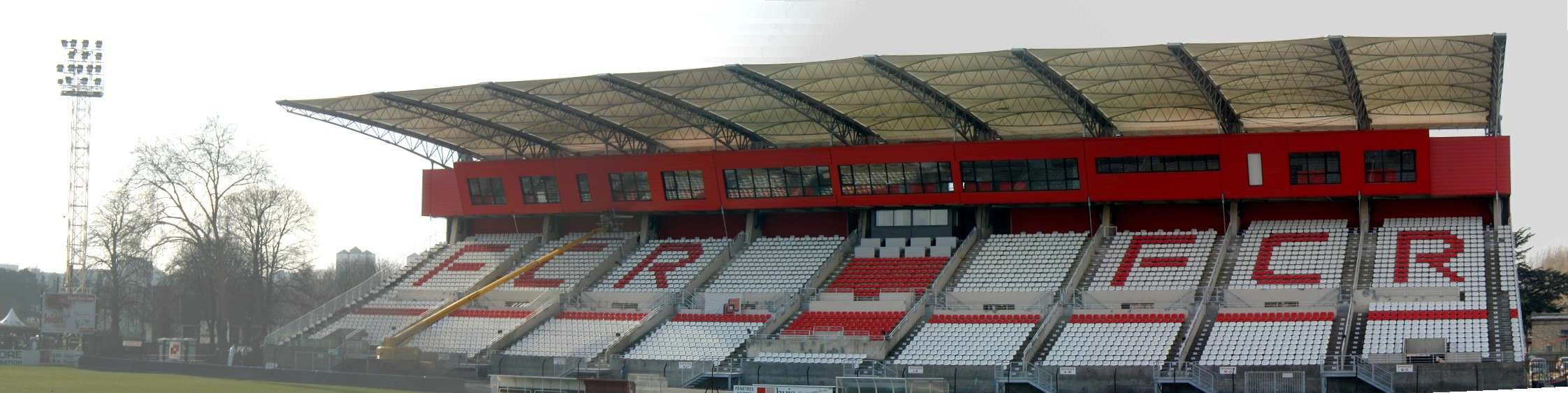
- Interactive map of Stade Robert Diochon
- Location: Le Petit-Quevilly, France
- Capacity: 8,372
- Surface: Grass

Construction
- Opened: 1917
- Renovated: 1964, 1980, 2003

Tenants
- FC Rouen; US Quevilly-Rouen; Rouen Normandie Rugby

The Stade Robert-Diochon (French pronunciation: [stad ʁɔbɛʁ djɔʃɔ̃]) is a stadium in Le Petit-Quevilly, France, named after local footballer Robert Diochon. It is currently used for football matches and is the home stadium of both FC Rouen and US Quevilly-Rouen. As of 2022, the Rugby Union club Rouen Normandie Rugby are also using the stadium. The stadium has a capacity of 8,372.
