= Stade Amable-et-Micheline-Lozai =

Multi-purpose stadium in Le Petit-Quevilly, France

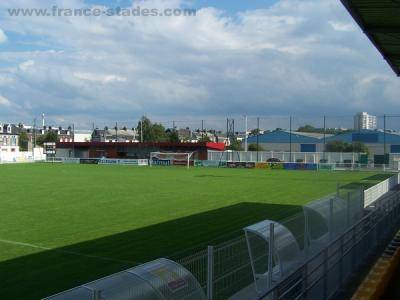

- Location within France
- Former names: Stade de la Porte-de-Diane (1912–1954)
- Address: 2 Rue Porte-de-Diane; 76140 Le Petit-Quevilly, Normandy, France
- Coordinates: 49.253°N 01.030°E
- Capacity: 2,000 (300 seated)

Construction
- Built: 1912

Tenants
- US Quevilly-Rouen

The Stade Amable-et-Micheline-Lozai is a multi-purpose stadium located in Le Petit-Quevilly, France. It is home to US Quevilly-Rouen.

== History ==
The stadium was inaugurated in 1912 under the name of Stade de la Porte-de-Diane. On 13 September 1954, it was renamed in honor of the historic leaders of the club.

== Bibliography ==
- André Boëda (May 2002), Éd. Bertout (ed.), Union Sportive Quevillaise « Un siècle de Football » 1902-2002, Dieppe, p. 62, ISBN 2-86743-465-3, Un siècle de Football
