= Alpha Sissoko =

French footballer (born 1997)

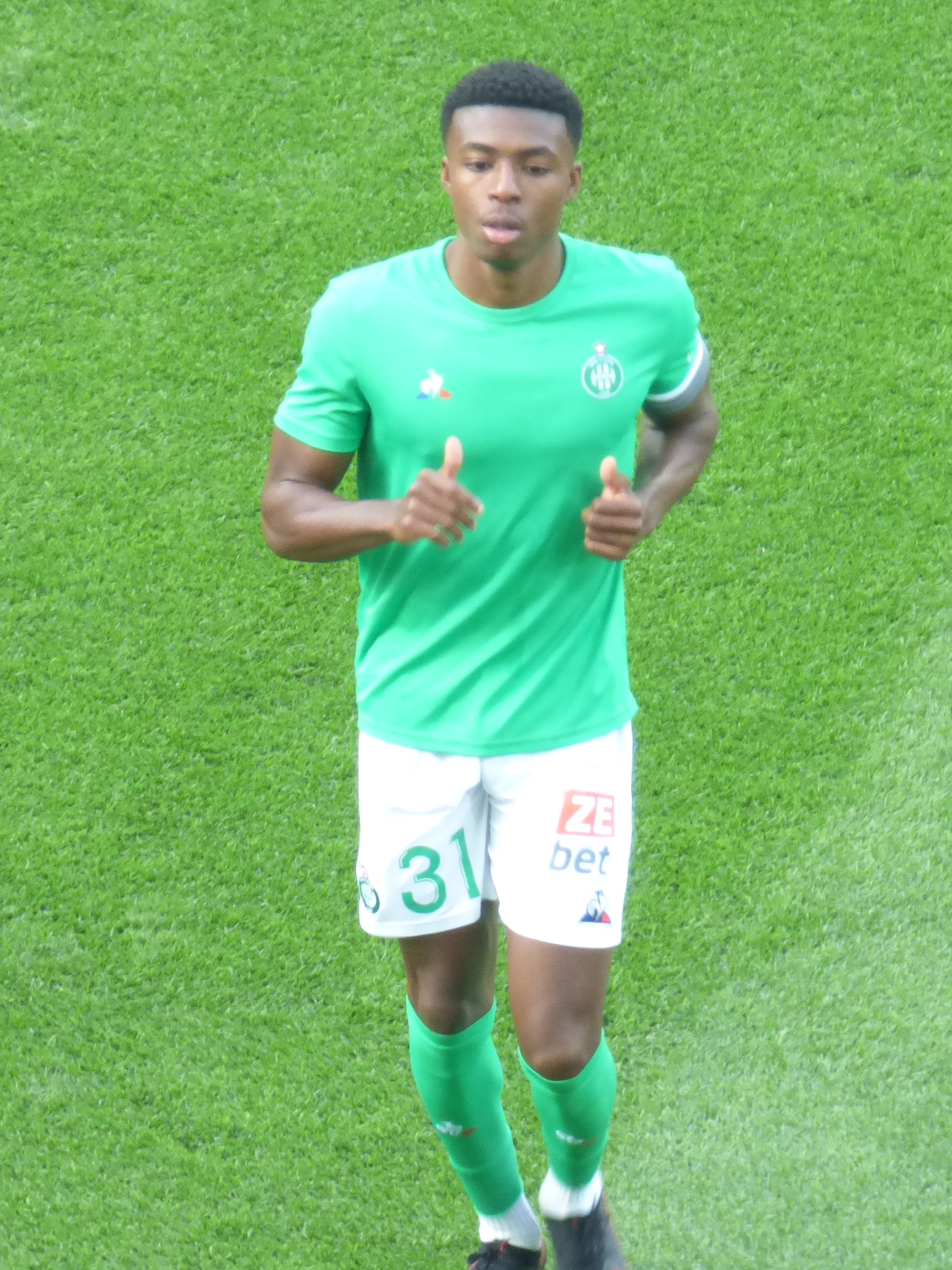
- Sissoko with Saint-Étienne in 2020

Personal information
- Full name: Alpha Nelson Sissoko
- Date of birth: 7 March 1997 (age 29)
- Place of birth: Bondy, France
- Height: 1.78 m (5 ft 10 in)
- Position: Right-back

Team information
- Current team: Montpellier
- Number: 58

Youth career
- 2014–2017: Clermont

Senior career*
Years	Team	Apps	(Gls)
2016–2019	Clermont B	41	(1)
2017–2019	Clermont	22	(0)
2019–2022	Saint-Étienne B	9	(0)
2019–2022	Saint-Étienne	10	(0)
2020	→ Le Puy B (loan)	1	(0)
2020	→ Le Puy (loan)	4	(0)
2022–2024	Quevilly-Rouen	71	(0)
2024–2026	Guingamp	58	(0)
2026–	Montpellier	0	(0)
- * Club domestic league appearances and goals as of 5 September 2026

Alpha Nelson Sissoko (born 7 March 1997) is a French professional footballer who plays as a right-back for Ligue 2 club Montpellier.

== Club career ==
Sissoko made his professional debut for Clermont in a Ligue 2 2–0 win over Châteauroux on 19 September 2017.

On 30 January 2022, Sissoko signed with Quevilly-Rouen until the end of the season.

== Personal life ==
Alpha Sissoko was born in Bondy, France and has French nationality. He is of Malian descent.

== Honours ==
Individual

- UNFP Ligue 2 Team of the Year: 2024–25
