= Balthazar Pierret =

French footballer (born 2000)

Personal information
- Full name: Balthazar Jean Philippe Marie Pierret
- Date of birth: 15 May 2000 (age 26)
- Place of birth: Cormeilles-en-Parisis, France
- Height: 1.86 m (6 ft 1 in)
- Position: Midfielder

Team information
- Current team: Nantes
- Number: 44

Youth career
- 2014–2018: FCB Escola Varsovia
- 2018–2019: Nice

Senior career*
Years	Team	Apps	(Gls)
2018–2020	Nice II	13	(0)
2020	Nice	0	(0)
2020–2022	Boulogne	35	(1)
2020–2022	Boulogne II	6	(0)
2022	Dinamo București	15	(2)
2022–2024	Quevilly-Rouen	60	(6)
2024–2026	Lecce	33	(0)
2026	Red Star	13	(0)
2026–	Nantes	1	(0)
- * Club domestic league appearances and goals as of 7 September 2026

Balthazar Jean Philippe Marie Pierret (born 15 May 2000) is a French professional footballer who plays as a midfielder for Ligue 2 club Nantes.

== Career ==
On 22 June 2022, Pierret signed a contract with Quevilly-Rouen for one year, with an option to extend for a second year.

On 19 June 2024, Pierret signed a three-year contract with Lecce in Italy.

On 31 January 2026, Pierret returned to France and joined Red Star in Ligue 2.
