= Nadjib Cissé =

Malian footballer (born 2000)

Personal information
- Full name: Nadjib Vassiriki Cissé
- Date of birth: 22 December 2000 (age 25)
- Place of birth: Abidjan, Ivory Coast
- Height: 1.88 m (6 ft 2 in)
- Position: Defender

Team information
- Current team: Bordeaux
- Number: 20

Youth career
- –2019: Afrique Football Élite

Senior career*
| Years | Team | Apps | (Gls) |
| 2019–2021 | Reims B | 0 | (0) |
| 2021–2025 | Quevilly-Rouen | 63 | (1) |
| 2021–2025 | Quevilly-Rouen B | 17 | (0) |
| 2025– | Bordeaux | 0 | (0) |
- * Club domestic league appearances and goals as of 26 May 2025

Nadjib Vassiriki Cissé (born 22 December 2000) is a Malian professional footballer who plays as a defender for French Régional 1 club Bordeaux.

== Career ==
Cissé developed at Afrique Football Élite before joining Reims in 2019. In the 2021–22 season, he integrated the first team of Quevilly-Rouen in Ligue 2, eventually signing a professional contract.

== Personal life ==
Born in Abidjan, Cissé holds Malian nationality.
