= Samuel Loric =

French footballer (born 2000)

Personal information
- Date of birth: 5 July 2000 (age 26)
- Place of birth: Vannes, France
- Height: 1.83 m (6 ft 0 in)
- Position: Left-back

Youth career
- 2006–2011: AS Ménimur
- 2011–2019: Vannes

Senior career*
Years	Team	Apps	(Gls)
2017–2019	Vannes	29	(1)
2019–2022	Lorient II	21	(0)
2019–2023	Lorient	3	(0)
2019	→ Vannes (loan)	8	(0)
2020–2021	→ Avranches (loan)	18	(1)
2020–2021	→ Avranches II (loan)	3	(0)
2023	→ Quevilly-Rouen (loan)	9	(0)
2023–2024	Quevilly-Rouen	30	(1)
2024–2026	1. FC Magdeburg	15	(2)

International career
- Brittany U16
- * Club domestic league appearances and goals as of 17 May 2026

Samuel Loric (born 5 July 2000) is a French professional footballer who plays as a left-back.

== Club career ==
=== Debut in Vannes ===
Born in Vannes, Samuel Loric started playing football at the age of 6 in his hometown club of AS Ménimur, before joining Vannes Olympique as an 11 years old.

Soon appearing as one of the most promising prospects of the Britannic academy, he was even very close to joining Lorient as an under-14, if not for a serious thigh injury. Loric became a regular starter with Vannes OC first team as a 17 years old in the Championnat National 3, after he made his debut against Pontivy in 2017, during a 2–0 Coupe de France win.

For the following season, as his side had been promoted to the Championnat National 2, the young defender played an even bigger role helping Vannes avoid relegation. He scored his first goal on 19 January 2019, as the Vannetais smashed Paris Saint-Germain reserve team in a 4–0 championship win, against the likes of Yacine Adli, Arthur Zagré, Loïc Mbe Soh, Éric Ebimbe, Moussa Sissako or Virgiliu Postolachi.

=== Professional contract in Lorient ===
On the last day of January 2019, Samuel Loric signed his first professional contract with FC Lorient, before being loaned back to Vannes until the end of the National 2 season.

Loric made his professional debut for Lorient in the 2019–20 season on 13 August 2019, starting in a 2–1 Coupe de la Ligue loss against Le Mans.

But after a season where he mainly played with Lorient reserve in National 2, while Vincent Le Goff retained the spot on the left of the defense in their 2019–20 Ligue 2 winning campaign, Loric was loaned to US Avranches for the 2020–21 National season. Despite a season with ups and downs for the Norman club, the young left-back was one of the standout players of his team, notably scoring a goal and delivering an assist in the two Normandy derbies against Quevilly-Rouen.

Back in Lorient for their second consecutive season in Ligue 1, Samuel Loric was included in the first team for the summer preparation, playing the pre-season friendlies, most notably scoring the only goal of a 1–0 away win against FC Nantes.

Christophe Pélissier awarded him his league debut on 21 November 2021, in what was deemed an honorable performance against Angers, despite the 1–0 away loss.

On 10 January 2023, Loric joined Ligue 2 club Quevilly-Rouen on loan until the end of the season.

=== Magdeburg ===
On 29 August 2024, Loric signed with 1. FC Magdeburg in Germany.

== International career ==
Loric played for Brittany as an under-16, were Alain Thiboult was the first coach to play him as a fullback.

== Style of play ==
Samuel Loric first played as a midfielder or a left winger, before deciding to switch to left-back, where he played his first games with Vannes senior team under David Gouzerch.
