= Till Cissokho =

French footballer (born 2000)

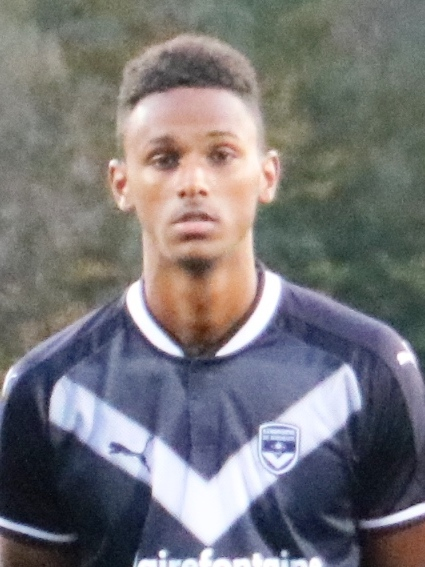
- Cissokho in October 2017

Personal information
- Date of birth: 8 February 2000 (age 26)
- Place of birth: Paris, France
- Height: 2.00 m (6 ft 7 in)
- Position: Centre-back

Team information
- Current team: HJK Helsinki
- Number: 3

Youth career
- 2009–2015: Montrouge 92
- 2015–2019: Bordeaux

Senior career*
Years	Team	Apps	(Gls)
2017–2019	Bordeaux II	39	(2)
2019	Bordeaux	1	(0)
2019–2022	Clermont	3	(0)
2019–2022	Clermont B	10	(0)
2020–2021	→ Austria Lustenau (loan)	26	(1)
2021–2022	→ Quevilly-Rouen (loan)	24	(1)
2022–2024	Quevilly-Rouen	73	(2)
2024–2025	Estrela da Amadora	4	(0)
2025	→ Rodez (loan)	12	(0)
2026–	HJK Helsinki	17	(0)

International career^{‡}
2015–2016	France U16	11	(0)
2016	France U17	4	(0)
2018	France U18	3	(0)
- * Club domestic league appearances and goals as of 3 November 2026 ‡ National team caps and goals as of 20:37, 11 September 2021 (UTC)

Till Cissokho (born 8 February 2000) is a French professional footballer who plays as centre-back for Veikkausliiga club HJK Helsinki.

== Club career ==
On 11 January 2019, Cissokho signed his first professional contract with Bordeaux. He made his professional debut with Bordeaux in a 3–0 Ligue 1 loss to Saint-Étienne on 14 April 2019.

On 27 June 2022, Quevilly-Rouen confirmed that Cissokho will return to the club for the 2022–23 season on a permanent contract after playing on loan in the previous season.

On 22 August 2024, Cissokho moved to Portugal, signing a two-year contract with Primeira Liga club Estrela da Amadora. On 13 January 2025, he was loaned to Rodez. On 7 October 2025, Cissokho's contract with Estrela was terminated by mutual agreement.

On 18 January 2026, Cissokho moved to Finland, joining Veikkausliiga club HJK Helsinki on a one-year contract, with an option for a further year.

== International career ==
Cissokho is a former youth international for France, representing his country from under-16 to under-18 level. He won the Tournoi du Val-de-Marne with the under-16 side in 2015. He's of Senegalese descent.

== Honours ==
France U16

- Tournoi du Val-de-Marne: 2015
