= Le Petit-Quevilly =

- Commune
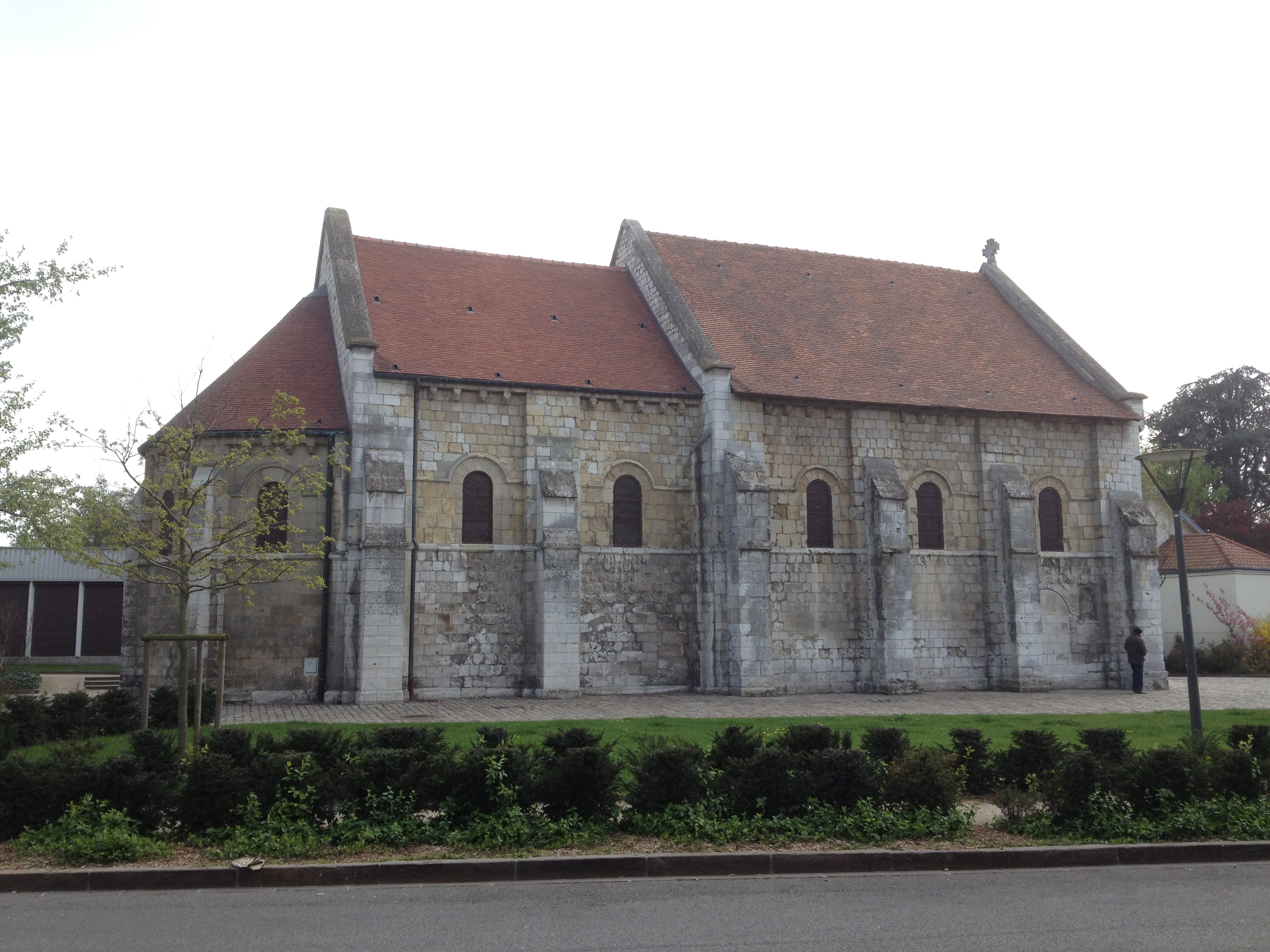
- The chapel of Saint-Julien in Le Petit-Quevilly
- Location of Le Petit-Quevilly
- Location within France Location within Normandy
- Coordinates: 49°25′52″N 1°03′14″E
- Country: France
- Region: Normandy
- Department: Seine-Maritime
- Arrondissement: Rouen
- Canton: Le Petit-Quevilly
- Intercommunality: Métropole Rouen Normandie

Government
  - Mayor (2026–32): Charlotte Goujon
- Area^{1}: 4.35 km^{2} (1.68 sq mi)
- Elevation: 5 m (16 ft)
- Highest elevation: 33 m (108 ft)
- Lowest elevation: 3 m (9.8 ft)
- Population (2023): 22,208
  - Density: 5,110/km^{2} (13,200/sq mi)
- Time zone: UTC+01:00 (CET)
  - Summer (DST): UTC+02:00 (CEST)
- INSEE/Postal code: 76498 /76140
- ^{1} French Land Register data, which excludes lakes, ponds, glaciers > 1 km^{2} (0.386 sq mi or 247 acres) and river estuaries.

Le Petit-Quevilly (French pronunciation: [lə pəti kəviji], locally [le p(ə)ti kəvili]) is a commune in the Seine-Maritime department, region of Normandy, France.

== History ==
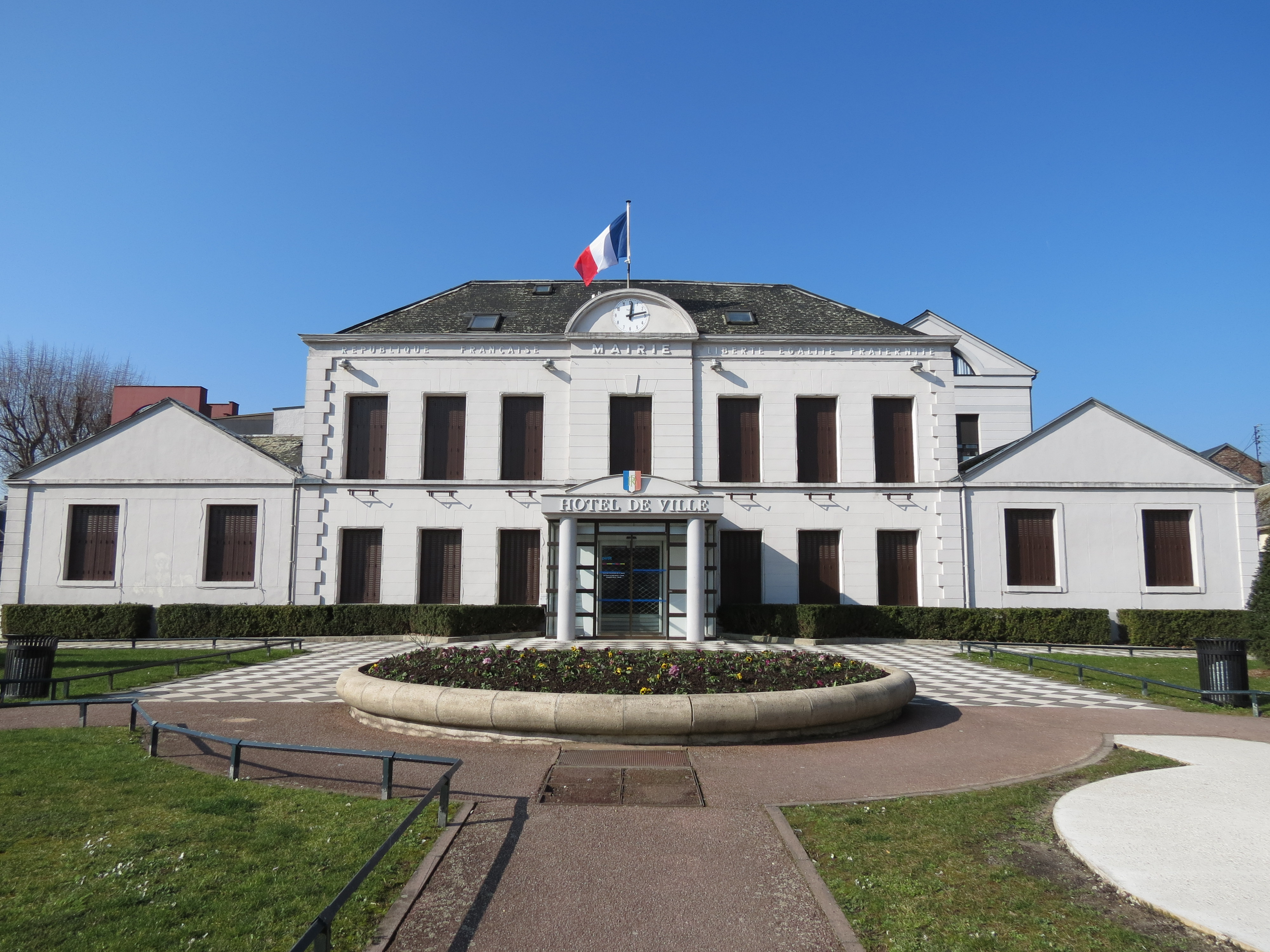
The Hôtel de Ville

The Hôtel de Ville was completed in 1846.

== Geography ==
A residential and light industrial suburb situated inside a meander of the river Seine on the opposite bank to Rouen city centre, at the junction of the D3 and the N338 roads.

== Population ==
Historical population

Year	Pop.	±% p.a.
1793	800	—
1800	775	−0.45%
1806	825	+1.05%
1821	1,265	+2.89%
1831	1,455	+1.41%
1836	2,116	+7.78%
1841	2,379	+2.37%
1846	2,707	+2.62%
1851	3,105	+2.78%
1856	3,930	+4.83%
1861	4,655	+3.44%
1866	4,677	+0.09%
1872	4,981	+1.06%
1876	6,250	+5.84%
1881	7,680	+4.21%
1886	10,273	+5.99%
1891	10,688	+0.80%
1896	11,737	+1.89%
1901	13,948	+3.51%

Year	Pop.	±% p.a.
1906	14,929	+1.37%
1911	16,682	+2.25%
1921	17,478	+0.47%
1926	17,959	+0.54%
1931	18,910	+1.04%
1936	19,474	+0.59%
1946	19,953	+0.24%
1954	20,798	+0.52%
1962	21,098	+0.18%
1968	22,876	+1.36%
1975	22,401	−0.30%
1982	22,876	+0.30%
1990	22,600	−0.15%
1999	22,332	−0.13%
2007	21,970	−0.20%
2012	22,089	+0.11%
2017	21,995	−0.09%
2023	22,208	+0.16%

Source: EHESS and INSEE (1968-2023)

== Sports ==
US Quevilly-Rouen is based in the commune.

== Places of interest ==
- The recently restored church of St. Pierre, dating from the sixteenth century.
- The church of St. Antoine.
- The church of St. Bernadette, dating from the sixteenth century.
- The recently restored chapel of St. Julien, dating from the twelfth century.
- The seventeenth century manorhouse of Queval.
- Vestiges of a Carthusian monastery.
- An old cottonmill, restored and now used as offices and a college.
- Amable-et-Micheline-Lozai Stadium

== People ==
- Jean Trévoux, racing driver was born here in 1905.
- Daniel Horlaville, retired professional footballer was born here in 1945.
- Patrice Rio, retired professional footballer was born here in 1948.
- Valérie Fourneyron, politician was born here in 1959.
- Catherine Morin-Desailly, politician was born here in 1960.
- Alain Blondel, retired decathlete was born here in 1962.
- Patrick Pouyanné, CEO of Total was born here in 1963.
- Franck Dubosc, actor and comedian was born here in 1963.

== See also ==
- Communes of the Seine-Maritime department
