= 2023–24 En Avant Guingamp season =

En Avant Guingamp
2023–24 season
- Manager: Stéphane Dumont
- Stadium: Stade de Roudourou
- Ligue 2: 9th
- Coupe de France: Round of 64

The 2023–24 season was En Avant Guingamp's 112th season in existence and fifth consecutive in the Ligue 2. They also competed in the Coupe de France.

== Players ==
=== First-team squad ===
As of 1 August 2023.

Note: Flags indicate national team as defined under FIFA eligibility rules; some limited exceptions apply. Players may hold more than one non-FIFA nationality.

| No. | Pos. | Nation | Player |
|---|---|---|---|
| 1 | GK | GLP | Teddy Bartouche |
| 2 | DF | FRA | Baptiste Roux |
| 3 | DF | FRA | Arthur Vitelli |
| 4 | MF | FRA | Dylan Louiserre |
| 5 | DF | FRA | Hady Camara |
| 6 | DF | FRA | Lenny Vallier |
| 7 | DF | SEN | Donatien Gomis |
| 9 | FW | MAR | Amine El Ouazzani |
| 10 | MF | FRA | Mehdi Merghem |
| 11 | MF | SEN | Amadou Sagna |
| 12 | DF | SEN | Abdallah Ndour |
| 13 | MF | FRA | Théo Le Normand |
| 15 | DF | FRA | Vincent Manceau |
| 16 | GK | FRA | Enzo Basilio |
| 17 | FW | FRA | Jacques Siwe |
| 18 | FW | FRA | Gaëtan Courtet |

| No. | Pos. | Nation | Player |
|---|---|---|---|
| 19 | MF | URU | Jonathan Iglesias |
| 20 | MF | FRA | Hugo Picard |
| 21 | FW | BEL | Baptiste Guillaume |
| 22 | FW | ALG | Mehdi Baaloudj |
| 23 | DF | FRA | Taylor Luvambo |
| 24 | DF | FRA | Pierre Lemonnier |
| 25 | DF | TUN | Ayman Ben Mohamed |
| 26 | DF | FRA | Matthis Riou |
| 27 | DF | COD | Maxime Sivis |
| 28 | MF | FRA | Maxime Barthelmé |
| 30 | GK | MTN | Babacar Niasse |
| 31 | DF | FRA | Lucas Maronnier |
| 32 | FW | FRA | Sabri Guendouz |
| 34 | DF | FRA | Sohaib Nair |
| 40 | GK | FRA | Noah Marec |

== Transfers ==
=== In ===
| Pos. | Player | Transferred from | Fee | Date | Source |
|---|---|---|---|---|---|
| GK | (France) [[]] | (France) | | 1 July 2023 | |
| GK | (France) [[]] | (France) | | 1 July 2023 | |

=== Out ===
| Pos. | Player | Transferred to | Fee | Date | Source |
|---|---|---|---|---|---|
| GK | (France) [[]] | (France) | | 1 July 2023 | |

== Pre-season and friendlies ==
Win Draw Loss

| 8 July 2023 Friendly | Guingamp (France) | 1–0 | (France) Angers |
| 15:00 CEST (UTC+2) |
Note: Match was played in two periods of 30 minutes each.

| 14 July 2023 Friendly | Guingamp (France) | 1–0 | (France) Le Mans | Pabu |
| 17:00 CEST (UTC+2) | Picard 65' | | | Stadium: Stade Centre Formation EAG 1 |

| 19 July 2023 Friendly | Guingamp (France) | 0–1 | (France) Quevilly-Rouen | Avranches |
| 16:30 CEST (UTC+2) | | | | Stadium: Stade René Fenouillère |

| 22 July 2023 Friendly | Guingamp (France) | 2–2 | (France) Lorient | Guingamp |
| 17:00 CEST (UTC+2) | Siwe 105'; Luvambo 115'; Merghem (penalty missed) 120' | | Le Bris 25'; Kroupi 84' | Stadium: Pro Park |
Note: Match was played in four periods of 30 minutes each.

| 29 July 2023 Friendly | Guingamp (France) | 0–1 | (France) Brest | Guingamp |
| 17:00 CEST (UTC+2) | | | Le Douaron 14' | Stadium: Stade du Roudourou |

== Competitions ==
=== Overall record ===
| Competition | First match | Last match | Starting round | Final position | Record | | | | | | | |
| Competition | First match | Last match | Starting round | Final position | Pld | W | D | L | GF | GA | GD | Win % |
|---|---|---|---|---|---|---|---|---|---|---|---|---|
| Ligue 2 | 5 August 2023 | 17 May 2024 | Matchday 1 | 9th | 38 | 13 | 12 | 13 | 44 | 40 | +4 | 34.21 |
| Coupe de France | 18 November 2023 | 7 January 2024 | Seventh round | Round of 64 | 3 | 1 | 1 | 1 | 3 | 4 | −1 | 33.33 |
| Total | | | | | 41 | 14 | 13 | 14 | 47 | 44 | +3 | 34.15 |

Source: Soccerway

=== Ligue 2 ===
==== League table ====
| Pos | Team | Pld | W | D | L | GF | GA | GD | Pts |
|---|---|---|---|---|---|---|---|---|---|
| 7 | Laval | 38 | 15 | 10 | 13 | 40 | 45 | −5 | 55 |
| 8 | Amiens | 38 | 12 | 17 | 9 | 36 | 36 | 0 | 53 |
| 9 | Guingamp | 38 | 13 | 12 | 13 | 44 | 40 | +4 | 51 |
| 10 | Pau | 38 | 13 | 12 | 13 | 60 | 57 | +3 | 51 |
| 11 | Grenoble | 38 | 13 | 12 | 13 | 43 | 44 | −1 | 51 |

Updated to match(es) played on 17 May 2024. Source: Ligue 2
Rules for classification: 1) Points; 2) Goal difference; 3) Number of goals scored; 4) Head-to-head goal difference; 5) Fair play points

==== Results summary ====
| Overall | | | | | | | | Home | | | | | | Away | | | | | |
| Pld | W | D | L | GF | GA | GD | Pts | W | D | L | GF | GA | GD | W | D | L | GF | GA | GD |
|---|---|---|---|---|---|---|---|---|---|---|---|---|---|---|---|---|---|---|---|
| 38 | 13 | 12 | 13 | 44 | 40 | +4 | 51 | 5 | 7 | 7 | 24 | 21 | +3 | 8 | 5 | 6 | 20 | 19 | +1 |

Last updated: 17 May 2024.

==== Results by round ====
| Round | 1 | 2 | 3 | 4 | 5 | 6 | 7 | 8 | 9 | 10 | 11 | 12 | 13 | 14 | 15 | 16 | 17 | 18 | 19 | 20 | 21 | 22 | 23 | 24 | 25 | 26 | 27 | 28 | 29 | 30 | 31 | 32 | 33 | 34 | 35 | 36 | 37 | 38 |
|---|---|---|---|---|---|---|---|---|---|---|---|---|---|---|---|---|---|---|---|---|---|---|---|---|---|---|---|---|---|---|---|---|---|---|---|---|---|---|
| Ground | A | H | A | H | A | H | A | H | A | H | H | A | H | A | A | H | A | H | A | A | H | A | H | A | H | A | H | A | H | A | H | A | H | H | A | H | A | H |
| Result | W | L | D | W | L | W | L | D | W | D | D | D | W | D | W | L | W | L | L | W | D | D | L | L | W | L | D | W | W | D | D | W | L | L | W | D | L | L |
| Position | 2 | 10 | 9 | 4 | 7 | 4 | 9 | 9 | 6 | 7 | 8 | 8 | 7 | 8 | 6 | 6 | 6 | 6 | 8 | 6 | 7 | 8 | 9 | 11 | 10 | 11 | 11 | 8 | 6 | 7 | 8 | 8 | 8 | 9 | 9 | 9 | 9 | 9 |

Updated to match(es) played on 17 May 2024. Source:
A = Away; H = Home; W = Win; D = Draw; L = Loss

==== Matches ====
The league fixtures were unveiled on 29 June 2023.

| 5 August 2023 1 | Annecy | 1–4 | Guingamp | Annecy |
| 19:00 | Bosetti 45+3' (pen.); Jean (yellow card) 79'; Yacouba Barry (yellow card) 89' | Report | Picard 54'; El Ouazzani 72'; Sagna 74'; Merghem 90' | Stadium: Parc des Sports; Referee: (France) Olivier Thual |

| 12 August 2023 2 | Guingamp | 0–1 | Dunkerque | Guingamp |
| 19:00 | Iglesias (yellow card) 63'; Courtet (penalty missed) 72'; Gomis (yellow card) 80'; Guillaume (yellow card) 80'; Sivis (yellow card) 90+8' | Report | Sanganté (yellow card) 71'; Orelien 82' (pen.); Ba-Sy (yellow card) 90+3'; Anziani (yellow card) 90+8' | Stadium: Stade de Roudourou; Attendance: 8,294; Referee: Azzédine Souifi |

| 19 August 2023 3 | Valenciennes | 0–0 | Guingamp | Valenciennes |
| 19:00 | Jonathan Buatu (yellow card) 28'; Linguet (yellow card) 35'; Boutoutaou (yellow card) 36'; Woudenberg (yellow card) 79' | Report | Sivis (yellow card) 31'; Courtet (yellow card) 79' | Stadium: Stade du Hainaut; Attendance: 4,986; Referee: (France) Antoine Valnet |

| 26 August 2023 4 | Guingamp | 4–0 | Pau | Guingamp |
| 19:00 CET (UTC+1) | Sidibé 17' (yellow card) 36'; Gomis 38' (yellow card) 42'; Sagna 50'; Ndour (yellow card) 82'; Sivis 89' | Report | Kamara (yellow card) 38'; Sylla (yellow card) 90+4' | Stadium: Stade de Roudourou; Attendance: 6,629; Referee: (France) Faouzi Benchabane |

| 2 September 2023 5 | Amiens SC | 4–1 | Guingamp | Amiens |
| 19:00 CET (UTC+1) | Kakuta (yellow card) 3' (goal) 81'; Leautey 42'; Mafouta 77' 90+1' | Report | Guillaume (yellow card) 13'; El Ouazzani 40'; Louiserre (yellow card) 53'; Sidibé (yellow card) 62'; Basilio (yellow card) 78' | Stadium: Stade de la Licorne; Attendance: 6,950; Referee: (France) Benjamin Lepaysant |

| 18 September 2023 6 | Guingamp | 3–0 | Ajaccio | Guingamp |
| 20:45 CET (UTC+1) | El Ouazzani 4' 32'; Guillaume 78' | Report | Benhaim (yellow card) 10' | Stadium: Stade de Roudourou; Attendance: 6,326; Referee: (France) Karim Abed |

| 23 September 2023 7 | Laval | 2–1 | Guingamp | Laval |
| 19:00 | Diaw 62'; Tchokounté (yellow card) 68' (goal) 89' | Report | Roux (yellow card) 44'; Guillaume 50' (yellow card) 52' | Stadium: Stade Francis Le Basser; Attendance: 8,800; Referee: (France) Thierry Bouille |

| 26 September 2023 8 | Guingamp | 0–0 | Bordeaux | Guingamp |
| 20:45 CET (UTC+1) | Courtet (yellow card) 61' | Report | Livolant (yellow card) 55' | Stadium: Stade de Roudourou; Attendance: 8,568; Referee: (France) Azzedine Souifi |

| 30 September 2023 9 | Caen | 0–1 | Guingamp | Caen |
| 19:00 | Thomas (yellow card) 90+4' | Report | Sagna 77'; Gomis (yellow card) 79'; Sidibé (yellow card) 89' | Stadium: Stade Michel d'Ornano; Attendance: 14,881; Referee: (France) Guillaume Paradis |

| 7 October 2023 10 | Guingamp | 2–2 | Grenoble Foot 38 | Guingamp |
| 19:00 CET | Sagna 2'; Merghem 45+2' | Report | Benet 23'; Sanyang (yellow card) 60'; Sivis 72' (o.g.) | Stadium: Stade de Roudourou; Attendance: 8,310; Referee: (France) Ahmed Taleb |

| 21 October 2023 11 | Guingamp | 2–2 | Quevilly-Rouen | Guingamp |
| 19:00 CET | El Ouazzani 16' (yellow card) 47'; Steven Fortès 80' (o.g.) | Report | Soumano 14'; Yade (yellow card) 31'; Delaurier-Chaubet 90+4' | Stadium: Stade de Roudourou; Attendance: 7,594; Referee: (France) Nicolas Rainville |

| 25 November 2023 15 | Troyes | 0–1 | Guingamp | Troyes |
| 19:00 | | | | Stadium: Stade de l'Aube |

| 2 December 2023 16 | Guingamp | 0–1 | Paris FC | Guingamp |
| 19:00 CET (UTC+1) | | Report | Kebbal 70' (pen.) | Stadium: Stade de Roudourou; Attendance: 9,173; Referee: Nicolas Rainville |

| 5 December 2023 17 | Saint-Étienne | 1–3 | Guingamp | Saint-Étienne |
| 20:45 CET (UTC+1) | Moueffek 21'; Tardieu (yellow card) 57'; Cissé (yellow card) 89' | Report | Sidibé 42'; Guillaume 55'; Courtet 87' | Stadium: Stade Geoffroy-Guichard; Attendance: 17,942; Referee: (France) Olivier Thual |

| 16 December 2023 18 | Guingamp | 0–1 | Concarneau | Guingamp |
| 19:00 CET (UTC+1) | Roux (yellow card) 40'; Sidibé (yellow card) 53'; Merghem (yellow card) 80' | Report | Mouazan 70'; Salles (yellow card) 90+2'; Urie (yellow card) 90+5' | Stadium: Stade de Roudourou; Attendance: 12,476; Referee: (France) Guillaume Paradis |

| 19 December 2023 19 | Angers | 1–0 | Guingamp | Angers |
| 20:45 CET (UTC+1) | Diony 24' (yellow card) 79' | Report | Sidibé (yellow card) 51'; Louiserre (yellow card) 53' | Stadium: Stade Raymond Kopa; Attendance: 10,205; Referee: (France) Faouzi Benchabane |

| 13 January 2024 20 | Quevilly-Rouen | 0–1 | Guingamp | Le Petit-Quevilly |
| 19:00 CET (UTC+1) | Pierret (yellow card) 50'; Sissoko (yellow card) 74' | Report | Merghem (yellow card) 45+1'; Guillaume 89' | Stadium: Stade Robert Diochon; Attendance: 3,003; Referee: (France) Mickaël Leleu |

| 23 January 2024 21 | Guingamp | 3–3 | Rodez | Guingamp |
| 20:45 CET (UTC+1) | Picard 1'; Sagna 26' (yellow card) 56'; Guillaume 31' | Report | Hountondji 3' 8'; Danger 45+2' (pen.); Raux-Yao (yellow card) 68' | Stadium: Stade de Roudourou; Attendance: 7,545; Referee: (France) Abdelatif Kherradji |

| 27 January 2024 22 | Auxerre | 1–1 | Guingamp | Auxerre |
| 19:00 CET (UTC+1) | Ayé 11'; Hein (yellow card) 82' | Report | Merghem 36'; Louiserre (yellow card) 82'; Luvambo (yellow card) 82' | Stadium: Stade de l'Abbé-Deschamps; Attendance: 13,667; Referee: (France) Mikael Lesage |

| 3 February 2024 23 | Guingamp | 1–4 | Annecy | Guingamp |
| 19:00 CET (UTC+1) | Gomis (red card) 16'; El Ouazzani 42'; Sidibé (yellow card) 78' (red card) 79' | Report | Djoco 18' (pen.) (yellow card) 27'; Camara 31'; Pajot (yellow card) 39'; Junior Diaz (yellow card) 54'; Ntamack 74' 87'; Beyer (yellow card) 82' | Stadium: Stade de Roudourou; Attendance: 6,176; Referee: (France) Thierry Bouille |

| 10 February 2024 24 | Ajaccio | 3–0 | Guingamp | Ajaccio |
| 19:00 CET (UTC+1) | Christopher Ibayi 27' (pen.) (yellow card) 58'; Chanot (yellow card) 45+1'; Touré 65' 76'; Puch-Herrantz (yellow card) 85' | Report | Manceau (yellow card) 74'; Siwe (red card) 90' | Stadium: Stade Michel-Moretti; Attendance: 3,623; Referee: (France) Guillaume Paradis |

| 17 February 2024 25 | Guingamp | 1–0 | Caen | Guingamp |
| 19:00 CET (UTC+1) | Gomis 4'; Sivis (yellow card) 63'; Lobry (yellow card) 89' | Report | Abdi (yellow card) 48'; Daubin (yellow card) 68'; Lebreton (yellow card) 89' | Stadium: Stade de Roudourou; Attendance: 9,371; Referee: (France) Karim Abed |

| 24 February 2024 26 | Bordeaux | 1–0 | Guingamp | Bordeaux |
| 19:00 CET (UTC+1) | Vipotnik 40'; Michelin (yellow card) 62' | Report | Louiserre (yellow card) 49'; Gomis (yellow card) 71'; Lemonnier (yellow card) 81'; Lucas Maronnier (yellow card) 82'; Sagna (yellow card) 87' | Stadium: Matmut Atlantique; Attendance: 20,109; Referee: (France) Mikael Lesage |

| 2 March 2024 27 | Guingamp | 0–0 | Troyes | Guingamp |
| 19:00 CET (UTC+1) | El Ouazzani (yellow card) 48'; Sivis (yellow card) 58' | Report | Saïd (yellow card) 44'; Tahrat (yellow card) 79' | Stadium: Stade de Roudourou; Attendance: 8,942; Referee: (France) Rémi Landry |

| 9 March 2024 28 | Concarneau | 2–3 | Guingamp | Brest |
| 19:00 CET (UTC+1) | Matondo 66'; Ba 86' | Report | El Ouazzani 1' 58'; Sidibé (yellow card) 42'; Roux (yellow card) 45'; Siwe (yellow card) 55'; Guillaume 90+1' | Stadium: Stade Francis-Le Blé; Attendance: 3,860; Referee: (France) Mickaël Leleu |

| 16 March 2024 29 | Guingamp | 3–0 | Valenciennes | Guingamp |
| 19:00 CET (UTC+1) | Lemonnier 7'; Merghem 22' (yellow card) 43'; El Ouazzani 64' | Report | Šabanović (yellow card) 78' | Stadium: Stade de Roudourou; Attendance: 8,955; Referee: (France) Aurélien Petit |

| 30 March 2024 30 | Grenoble | 0–0 | Guingamp | Grenoble |
| 19:00 CET (UTC+1) | Sanyang (yellow card) 64'; Sylvestre (yellow card) 78'; Rigo (yellow card) 90+3' | Report | Sivis (yellow card) 88' | Stadium: Stade des Alpes; Attendance: 4,881; Referee: (France) Karim Abed |

| 6 April 2024 31 | Guingamp | 0–0 | Amiens SC | Guingamp |
| 19:00 CET (UTC+1) | Sidibé (yellow card) 85' | Report | Kaïboué (yellow card) 78' | Stadium: Stade de Roudourou; Attendance: 9,078; Referee: (France) Clément Turpin |

| 13 April 2024 32 | Dunkerque | 0–1 | Guingamp | Dunkirk |
| 19:00 CET (UTC+1) | Fernandez-Veliz (yellow card) 64' (yellow-red card) 75'; Opa Sanganté (yellow card) 90+3' | Report | Louiserre (yellow card) 22'; Siwe 58'; Vallier (yellow card) 72' | Stadium: Stade Marcel-Tribut; Attendance: 3,985; Referee: (France) Nicolas Rainville |

| 20 April 2024 33 | Guingamp | 0–1 | Bastia | Guingamp |
| 19:00 CET (UTC+1) | Lucas Maronnier (yellow card) 37' | Report | Dramé 26'; Ducrocq (yellow card) 44' | Stadium: Stade de Roudourou; Attendance: 8,954; Referee: (France) Mikael Lesage |

| 23 April 2024 34 | Guingamp | 1–2 | Angers | Guingamp |
| 20:45 CET (UTC+1) | Guillaume 45+1'; Siwe (yellow card) 89'; Louiserre (yellow card) 90+4' | Report | Raolisoa 37'; Bamba (yellow card) 45+2'; Diony 83' | Stadium: Stade de Roudourou; Attendance: 9,259; Referee: (France) Olivier Thual |

| 27 April 2024 35 | Pau | 1–2 | Guingamp | Bizanos |
| 19:00 CET (UTC+1) | Kouassi (yellow card) 56'; Ahoussou (yellow card) 87'; Bassouamina 90+2'; Boutaïb (yellow card) 90+5' | Report | Picard 15'; Sivis (yellow card) 56'; Jordy Gaspar 90+3' (o.g.); Siwe (yellow card) 90+5' | Stadium: Nouste Camp; Attendance: 3,482; Referee: (France) Antoine Valnet |

| 4 May 2024 36 | Guingamp | 2–2 | Saint-Étienne | Guingamp |
| 19:00 CET (UTC+1) | El Ouazzani 67' (pen.); Siwe 84'; Sivis (yellow card) 90+5' (yellow-red card) 90+5' | Report | Moueffek 22'; Cafaro 45+2' (pen.); Cardona (yellow card) 83'; Chambost (yellow card) 90+2'; Larsonneur (yellow card) 90+4' | Stadium: Stade de Roudourou; Attendance: 11,224; Referee: (France) Guillaume Paradis |

| 10 May 2024 37 | Paris FC | 2–1 | Guingamp | Paris |
| 20:45 CET (UTC+1) | Dicko 27' 78'; Mbow (yellow card) 69' | Report | Merghem (yellow card) 72' (goal) 90+4' | Stadium: Stade Sébastien Charléty; Attendance: 10,009; Referee: (France) Pierre Legat |

| 17 May 2024 38 | Guingamp | 0–1 | Laval | Guingamp |
| 20:45 CET (UTC+1) | | Report | Diaw (yellow card) 33'; Cherni 45+3'; Samassa (yellow card) 90' | Stadium: Stade de Roudourou; Attendance: 10,607; Referee: (France) Mickaël Leleu |

=== Coupe de France ===
| 18 November 2023 Seventh round | Saint-Malo | 2–2 (2–4 p) | Guingamp | Saint-Malo |
| 18:00 CET (UTC+1) | | | | Stadium: Stade de Marville; Referee: Mikaël Lesage |

| 9 December 2023 Eighth round | AG Caennaise | 0–1 | Guingamp | Caen |
| 19:00 CET (UTC+1) | Sami Laabiss (yellow card) 84' | Report | Sidibé 71' | Stadium: Stade Michel d'Ornano; Attendance: 1,895; Referee: (France) Steven Llewellyn |

| 7 January 2024 Round of 64 | Guingamp | 0–2 | Rennes | Guingamp |
| 14:30 CET (UTC+1) | Roux (yellow card) 66' | Report | Theate (yellow card) 41'; Kalimuendo 45' 57'; Gallon (yellow card) 88'; Yıldırım (yellow card) 90+7' | Stadium: Stade de Roudourou; Attendance: 16,822; Referee: (France) Jérôme Brisard |
