= 2023–24 USL Dunkerque season =

USL Dunkerque
2023–24 season
- Manager: Mathieu Chabert (until 24 September); Luís Castro (from 27 September)
- Stadium: Stade Marcel-Tribut
- Ligue 2: 16th
- Coupe de France: Round of 32

The 2023–24 season was Union Sportive du Littoral de Dunkerque's 115th season in existence and first one back in the Ligue 2 after finishing second in the Championnat National. They are also competing in the Coupe de France.

== Players ==
=== First-team squad ===
As of 7 June 2024

Note: Flags indicate national team as defined under FIFA eligibility rules; some limited exceptions apply. Players may hold more than one non-FIFA nationality.

No.	Pos.	Nation	Player
1	GK	FRA	Lucas Lavallée (on loan from PSG)
2	DF	FRA	Alioune Ba
3	DF	TOG	Loïc Bessilé
4	DF	FRA	Nehemiah Fernandez-Veliz
5	DF	FRA	Rémy Boissier
8	MF	FRA	Tidiane Keita
9	FW	FRA	Samy Baghdadi
10	MF	FRA	Julien Anziani
11	MF	CMR	François Mughe (on loan from Marseille)
13	DF	GLP	Junior Senneville
14	FW	CIV	Moussa Guel (on loan from Samsunspor)
15	DF	MAR	Achraf Laâziri (on loan from Lyon)
16	GK	FRA	Arnaud Balijon
18	FW	FRA	Gaëtan Courtet

No.	Pos.	Nation	Player
19	DF	COM	Benjaloud Youssouf
20	MF	FRA	Enzo Bardeli
21	FW	CIV	Armand Gnanduillet
22	DF	FRA	Driss Trichard
23	DF	BEL	Bram Lagae (on loan from Gent)
24	FW	GUI	Elhadj Bah (on loan from Samsunspor)
26	DF	GBS	Opa Sanganté
27	MF	FRA	Rayan Ghrieb
28	DF	FRA	Demba Thiam
29	MF	PAN	Ángel Orelien
30	GK	CIV	Mohamed Koné (on loan from Le Havre)
80	MF	MAR	Gessime Yassine
92	MF	MAR	Aïman Maurer (on loan from Clermont)

=== Out on loan ===
Note: Flags indicate national team as defined under FIFA eligibility rules; some limited exceptions apply. Players may hold more than one non-FIFA nationality.

No.	Pos.	Nation	Player
—	DF	FRA	Geoffrey Kondo (at Furiani-Agliani until 30 June 2024)
—	MF	FRA	Guiry Egny (at Paris 13 Atletico until 30 June 2024)

No.	Pos.	Nation	Player
—	FW	FRA	Luderic Etonde (at Stade Briochin until 30 June 2024)
—	FW	COD	Freddy Mbemba (at Nîmes until 30 June 2024)

== Transfers ==
=== In ===
Pos.	Player	Transferred from	Fee	Date	Source
MF	(France) Rémy Boissier	Unattached	Free	18 July 2023	
GK	(France) Lucas Lavallée	(France) Paris Saint-Germain	Loan	19 July 2023	
FW	(Ivory Coast) Moussa Guel	(Turkey) Samsunspor	Loan	2 August 2023	

=== Out ===
Pos.	Player	Transferred to	Fee	Date	Source
DF	(France) Geoffrey Kondo	(France) Furiani-Agliani	Loan	20 July 2023	

== Pre-season and friendlies ==
Win Draw Loss

8 July 2023 Friendly	Lens (France)	4–4	(France) Dunkerque	Avion
11:00 UTC+2	Sotoca 12'; Baldé (penalty missed) 46'; Tormin 52'; Sishuba 80' (pen.); El Aynaoui 89'		Ghrieb 14'; Kondo 68'; Etonde 72' (pen.); Mbemba 75' (pen.)	Stadium: Stade François Blin

29 July 2023 Friendly	Dunkerque (France)	2–2	(France) Valenciennes
19:00 UTC+2	Youssouf 31'; Mbemba 90'		Boutoutaou 37', 59'

== Competitions ==
=== Overall record ===
Competition	First match	Last match	Starting round	Final position	Record							
Competition	First match	Last match	Starting round	Final position	Pld	W	D	L	GF	GA	GD	Win %
Ligue 2	5 August 2023	17 May 2024	Matchday 1	16th	38	12	10	16	36	52	−16	31.58
Coupe de France	18 November 2023	20 January 2024	Seventh round	Round of 32	4	2	1	1	6	5	+1	50.00
Total					42	14	11	17	42	57	−15	33.33

Source: Soccerway

=== Ligue 2 ===
==== League table ====
Pos	Team	Pld	W	D	L	GF	GA	GD	Pts	Promotion or Relegation
14	Annecy	38	12	10	16	49	50	−1	46	
15	Ajaccio	38	12	10	16	35	46	−11	46	
16	Dunkerque	38	12	10	16	36	52	−16	46	
17	Troyes	38	9	14	15	42	50	−8	41	Spared from relegation
18	Quevilly-Rouen (R)	38	7	17	14	51	55	−4	38	Relegation to National

Updated to match(es) played on 17 May 2024. Source: Ligue 2
Rules for classification: 1) Points; 2) Goal difference; 3) Number of goals scored; 4) Head-to-head goal difference; 5) Fair play points
(R) Relegated

==== Results summary ====
Overall								Home						Away					
Pld	W	D	L	GF	GA	GD	Pts	W	D	L	GF	GA	GD	W	D	L	GF	GA	GD
38	12	10	16	36	52	−16	46	4	4	11	15	30	−15	8	6	5	21	22	−1

==== Results by round ====
Round	1	2	3	4	5	6	7	8	9	10	11	12	13	14	15	16	17
Ground	H	A	A	H	A	H	H	A	H	A	H	A	H	A	H	A	H
Result	D	W	L	L	D	D	L	L	L	L	L	W	L	W	L	D	
Position	9	7	13	16	16	16	17	18	18	20	20	19	19	18	19		

A = Away; H = Home; W = Win; D = Draw; L = Loss

==== Matches ====
The league fixtures were unveiled on 29 June 2023.

5 August 2023 1	Dunkerque	2–2	Troyes	Dunkirk
19:00 UTC+2	Ghrieb 23' (pen.), 73', (yellow card) 30'; Gambor (yellow card) 38'	Report	Ilić 13'; Dong 17'; Ndiaye (yellow card) 52'	Stadium: Stade Marcel-Tribut; Referee: Rémi Landry

12 August 2023 2	Guingamp	0–1	Dunkerque	Guingamp
19:00 UTC+2	Iglesias (yellow card) 63'; Courtet (penalty missed) 72'; Gomis (yellow card) 80'; Guillaume (yellow card) 80'; Sivis (yellow card) 90+8'	Report	Sanganté (yellow card) 71'; Orelien 82' (pen.); Ba-Sy (yellow card) 90+3'; Anziani (yellow card) 90+8'	Stadium: Stade de Roudourou; Attendance: 8,294; Referee: Azzédine Souifi

26 August 2023 4	Dunkerque	0–1	Angers	Dunkirk
19:00				Stadium: Stade Marcel-Tribut

16 September 2023 6	Dunkerque	0–0	Grenoble	Dunkirk
19:00				Stadium: Stade Marcel-Tribut

23 September 2023 7	Dunkerque	1–2	Rodez	Dunkirk
19:00				Stadium: Stade Marcel-Tribut

30 September 2023 9	Dunkerque	0–1	Quevilly-Rouen	Dunkirk
19:00				Stadium: Stade Marcel-Tribut

4 October 2023 10	Saint-Étienne	2–0	Dunkerque	Auxerre
18:45

7 October 2023 11	Concarneau	4–3	Dunkerque	Lorient
19:00				Stadium: Stade du Moustoir

21 October 2023 12	Dunkerque	1–3	Paris FC	Dunkirk
19:00				Stadium: Stade Marcel-Tribut

28 October 2023 13	Auxerre	0–1	Dunkerque	Auxerre
19:00

4 November 2023 14	Dunkerque	0–1	Amiens	Dunkirk
19:00				Stadium: Stade Marcel-Tribut

11 November 2023 15	Valenciennes	0–1	Dunkerque	Valenciennes
19:00 CET (UTC+1)				Stadium: Stade du Hainaut

25 November 2023 16	Dunkerque	0–2	Laval	Dunkirk
19:00				Stadium: Stade Marcel-Tribut

2 December 2023 16	Pau	1–1	Dunkerque	Pau
19:00

5 December 2023 17	Dunkerque	v	Bastia	Dunkirk
20:45				Stadium: Stade Marcel-Tribut

=== Coupe de France ===
18 November 2023 Seventh round	Chaumont FC	0–1	Dunkerque	Chaumont
14:00		Report		Stadium: Stade Georges Dodin

9 December 2023 Eighth round	Reims Sainte-Anne	v	Dunkerque
13:30		Report
