= 2024–25 En Avant Guingamp season =

En Avant Guingamp
2024–25 season
- Manager: Sylvain Ripoll
- Stadium: Stade de Roudourou
- Ligue 2: 7th
- Coupe de France: Pre-season
Home colours

The 2024–25 season is the 113th season in the history of the En Avant Guingamp, and the club's sixth consecutive season in Ligue 2. In addition to the domestic league, the team will participate in the Coupe de France.

== Transfers ==
=== In ===
Pos.	Player	Transferred from	Fee	Date	Source
DF	(France) Alpha Sissoko	(France) Quevilly-Rouen	Free	2 July 2024	

=== Out ===
Pos.	Player	Transferred to	Fee	Date	Source
DF	(Tunisia) Ayman Ben Mohamed	(Tunisia) Espérance de Tunis	End of contract	1 July 2024	
DF	(France) Baptiste Roux	(Portugal) AVS	End of contract	1 July 2024	

== Friendlies ==
=== Pre-season ===
19 July 2024 Friendly	Concarneau (France)	1–2	(France) Guingamp
17:00	Kielt 45'		Picard 49'; Touzghar (penalty missed) 79'; Godame 83'

27 July 2024 Friendly	Le Havre (France)	3–0	(France) Guingamp
17:15
Note: Two periods of 30 minutes

27 July 2024 Friendly	Guingamp (France)	2–0	(France) Lorient
18:45
Note: Two periods of 30 minutes

3 August 2024 Friendly	Caen (France)	1–6	(France) Guingamp
18:00

== Competitions ==
=== Overall record ===
Competition	First match	Last match	Starting round	Record							
Competition	First match	Last match	Starting round	Pld	W	D	L	GF	GA	GD	Win %
Ligue 2	16 August 2024	10 May 2025	Matchday 1	6	3	1	2	12	9	+3	50.00
Coupe de France				0	0	0	0	0	0	+0	—
Total				6	3	1	2	12	9	+3	50.00

Source: Soccerway

=== Ligue 2 ===
==== League table ====
Pos	Team	Pld	W	D	L	GF	GA	GD	Pts	Promotion or Relegation
3	Metz (O, P)	34	18	11	5	63	34	+29	65	Qualification for promotion play-offs final
4	Dunkerque	34	17	5	12	47	40	+7	56	Qualification for promotion play-offs semi-final
5	Guingamp	34	17	4	13	57	45	+12	55	Qualification for promotion play-offs semi-final
6	Annecy	34	14	9	11	42	42	0	51	
7	Laval	34	14	8	12	44	38	+6	50	

Source: Ligue 2
Rules for classification: 1) Points; 2) Goal difference; 3) Number of goals scored; 4) Head-to-head goal difference; 5) Fair play points
(O) Play-off winners; (P) Promoted

==== Matches ====
The match schedule was released on 21 June 2024.

Fixture Win Draw Loss

16 August 2024 1	Guingamp	4–0	Troyes	Guingamp
20:00 UTC+2	Marronnier 19'; Siwe 33'; Luvambo 80' 83'	Report	Diop (yellow card) 17'; Diaz (yellow card) 45+1'; Akpakoun (yellow card) 63'; Bruus (yellow card) 69'	Stadium: Stade de Roudourou; Attendance: 8,052; Referee: Marc Bollengier

23 August 2024 2	Laval	0–1	Guingamp	Laval
20:00 UTC+2	Sanna (yellow card) 7'; Martins (yellow card) 90+3'	Report	Siwe 22'; Hemia (yellow card) 30'; Nair (yellow card) 70'	Stadium: Stade Francis Le Basser; Attendance: 7,280; Referee: Olivier Thual

30 August 2024 3	Guingamp	3–4	Red Star	Guingamp
20:00 UTC+2	Hemia 23' 45+1'; Labeau 78'	Report	Badji 3' 52'; Kouagba (yellow card) 26'; Danger 41' (pen.); Durand 60'	Stadium: Stade de Roudourou; Attendance: 7,872; Referee: Robin Chapapria

13 September 2024 4	Rodez	1–2	Guingamp	Rodez
20:00 UTC+2	Pelon (yellow card) 21'; Mambo (yellow card) 50'; Bentayeb 61'	Report	Siwe 38'; Hemia 71'	Stadium: Stade Paul-Lignon; Attendance: 3,791; Referee: Aurélien Petit

20 September 2024 5	Guingamp	2–2	Annecy	Guingamp
20:00 UTC+2	Sidibé 22'; Sissoko (yellow card) 43'; Hemia 80'	Report	Demoncy 4'; Pajot (yellow card) 36'; Kashi (yellow card) 45'; Drouhin 65'	Stadium: Stade de Roudourou; Attendance: 6,464; Referee: Pierre Gaillouste

24 September 2024 6	Paris FC	2–0	Guingamp	Paris
20:30 UTC+2	López 10'; Kebbal 75' (pen.)			Stadium: Stade Sébastien Charléty; Attendance: 6,484; Referee: Guillaume Paradis

30 September 2024 7	Guingamp	3-1	Caen	Guingamp
20:45	Siwe 6' (yellow card) 45+4'; Hemia (yellow card) 29'; Picard 67'; Luvambo 78'	Report	Henry (yellow card) 33'; M'Vila (yellow card) 47'; Mendy 51'; Debohi (yellow card) 54'	Stadium: Stade de Roudourou; Attendance: 7,558; Referee: (France) Romain Lissorgue

5 October 2024 8	Clermont	4-1	Guingamp	Clermont-Ferrand
14:00	Magnin 9'; Ousmane Diop 15' 56' (yellow card) 72'; Diallo (yellow card) 23'; Keïta (yellow card) 25'; Diédhiou 53'; Douane (yellow card) 90+5'	Report	Sidibé (yellow card) 25'; Lemonnier (yellow card) 39'; Siwe (yellow card) 67'; Sagna 88'	Stadium: Stade Gabriel-Montpied; Attendance: 4,385; Referee: (France) Pierre Legat

18 October 2024 9	Guingamp	0-1	Pau FC	Guingamp
20:00	Lucas Maronnier (yellow card) 6'; Sidibé (yellow card) 86'	Report	Beusnard (yellow card) 1'; Bobichon (yellow card) 40'; Boutaïb 58'; Koudou (yellow card) 90+1'	Stadium: Stade de Roudourou; Attendance: 8,112; Referee: (France) Eddy Rosier

25 October 2024 10	Metz	1-0	Guingamp	Metz
20:00	Diallo 71'	Report		Stadium: Stade Saint-Symphorien; Attendance: 19,290; Referee: (France) Ahmed Taleb

29 October 2024 11	Guingamp	1-0	Ajaccio	Guingamp
20:30	Sissoko (yellow card) 40'; Ghrieb 90+2'	Report	Santelli (yellow card) 23'	Stadium: Stade de Roudourou; Attendance: 7,187; Referee: (France) Antoine Valnet

2 November 2024 12	Guingamp	3-0	Grenoble	Guingamp
20:00	Labeau 1'; Siwe 57'; Sagna 67'; Sidibé (yellow card) 73'	Report	Mbemba (yellow card) 3'; Paquiez (yellow card) 60'; Touray (yellow card) 74'	Stadium: Stade de Roudourou; Attendance: 6,733; Referee: (France) Geoffrey Kubler

9 November 2024 13	Lorient	3-1	Guingamp	Lorient
14:00	Katseris 8'; Basilio 42' (o.g.); Soumano 68' (pen.)	Report	Louiserre 57' (pen.)	Stadium: Stade du Moustoir; Attendance: 14,345; Referee: (France) Mickaël Leleu
