= Dylan Louiserre =

French footballer (born 1995)

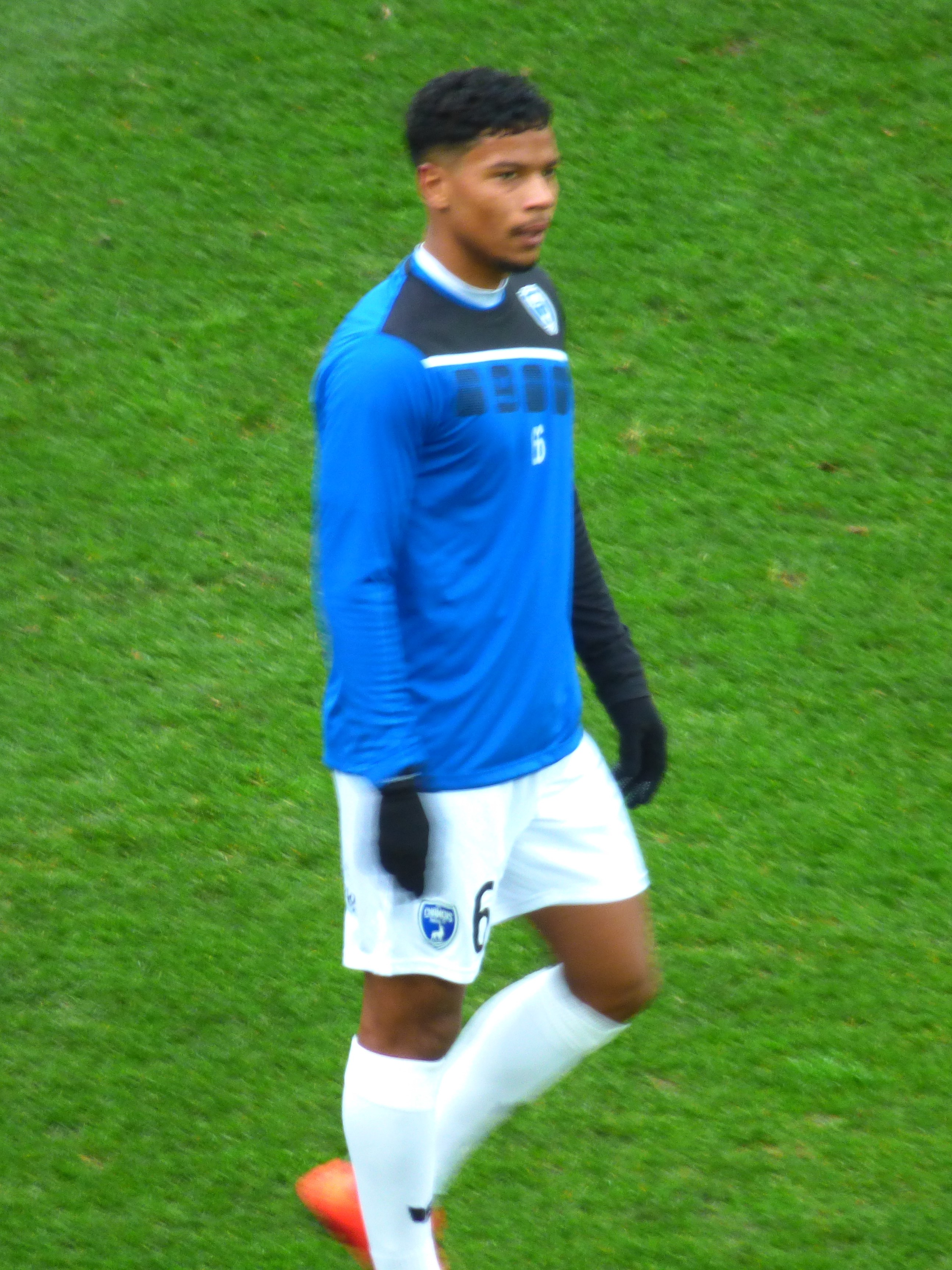

Personal information
- Date of birth: 2 February 1995 (age 31)
- Place of birth: Saint-Aubin, France
- Height: 1.72 m (5 ft 8 in)
- Position: Midfielder

Team information
- Current team: Guingamp
- Number: 4

Youth career
- 2001–2004: AMS La Bouille Moulineaux
- 2004–2008: C. Municipal S. d'Oissel
- 2008–2014: Le Havre

Senior career*
Years	Team	Apps	(Gls)
2012–2018	Le Havre II	44	(4)
2014–2018	Le Havre	42	(1)
2016–2017	→ Avranches (loan)	19	(2)
2016	→ Avranches II (loan)	2	(0)
2018–2022	Niort	128	(6)
2022–	Guingamp	135	(2)

International career
2015	France U20	2	(0)
- * Club domestic league appearances and goals as of 11 May 2026

Dylan Louiserre (born 2 February 1995) is a French footballer who plays for Guingamp as a midfielder.

== Club career ==
He started his professional career with Le Havre, and played for Avranches on loan during the 2016–17 season. Louiserre left Niort at the end of the 2021–22 season having made 137 appearances for the club in all competitions.

In June 2022, Louiserre signed with Guingamp.

== Personal life ==
Louiserre is of Guadeloupean descent.

== Career statistics ==
As of match played 14 May 2025

Appearances and goals by club, season and competition
Club	Season	League			Coupe de France		Coupe de la Ligue		Other		Total	
Club	Season	Division	Apps	Goals	Apps	Goals	Apps	Goals	Apps	Goals	Apps	Goals
Le Havre	2014–15	Ligue 2	16	0	1	0	0	0	—		17	0
Le Havre	2015–16	Ligue 2	23	1	0	0	1	0	—		24	1
Le Havre	2017–18	Ligue 2	3	0	0	0	2	0	—		5	0
Le Havre	Total		42	1	1	0	3	0	—		46	1
Avranches (loan)	2016–17	National	19	2	4	1	—		—		23	3
Chamois Niortais	2018–19	Ligue 2	36	2	3	1	0	0	—		39	3
Chamois Niortais	2019–20	Ligue 2	26	1	3	0	2	0	—		31	1
Chamois Niortais	2020–21	Ligue 2	34	2	0	0	— (Note: The Coupe de la Ligue was indefinitely suspended following the 2019–20 edition)		1 (Note: Matches played in the 2020–21 Ligue 2 relegation playoffs)	0	35	2
Chamois Niortais	2021–22	Ligue 2	32	1	— (Note: Niort excluded from the 2021–22 Coupe de France)		—		—		32	1
Chamois Niortais	Total		128	6	6	1	2	0	1	0	137	7
Guingamp	2022–23	Ligue 2	34	1	1	1	—		—		35	2
Guingamp	2023–24	Ligue 2	34	0	3	0	—		—		37	0
Guingamp	2024–25	Ligue 2	33	1	6	0	—		1 (Note: Matches played in the 2024–25 Ligue 2 promotion playoffs)	0	40	1
Guingamp	Total		101	2	10	1	—		1	0	112	3
Career total			290	11	21	3	5	0	2	0	318	14
