= Amine El Ouazzani =

Moroccan footballer (born 2001)

Personal information
- Date of birth: 15 July 2001 (age 25)
- Place of birth: Grenoble, France
- Height: 1.88 m (6 ft 2 in)
- Position: Forward

Team information
- Current team: Angers (on loan from Braga)
- Number: 19

Youth career
- Grenoble
- 2019–2020: Bourg-Péronnas

Senior career*
Years	Team	Apps	(Gls)
2020–2022	Bourg-Péronnas	51	(10)
2022–2024	Guingamp	61	(18)
2024–	Braga	46	(8)
2026–	→ Angers (loan)	2	(1)

International career^{‡}
2023–2024	Morocco U23	14	(4)
Medal record
Men's football
Representing Morocco
U-23 Africa Cup of Nations
Winner	2023 Morocco
- * Club domestic league appearances and goals as of 29 August 2026 ‡ National team caps and goals as of 23:24, 4 June 2024 (UTC)

Amine El Ouazzani (Arabic: أمين الوزاني; born 15 July 2001) is a professional footballer who plays as a forward for Ligue 1 club Angers, on loan from Primeira Liga club Braga. Born in France, he is a former Morocco youth international.

== Club career ==
A youth product of Grenoble and FBBP, El Ouazzani began his career with the latter in the Championnat National in 2020, scoring 10 goals in 51 league appearances. On 28 November 2022, he signed as a joker with Guingamp in the Ligue 2 until June 2025. He made his professional debut with Guingamp as a late substitute in a 2–1 win over Nîmes on 26 December 2022.

On 23 June 2024, El Ouazzani signed for Primeira Liga club Braga for a fee of €3.5 million on a five-year contract.

On 20 July 2026, El Ouazzani joined Ligue 1 club Angers on a season-long loan.

== International career ==
Born in France, El Ouazzani holds French and Moroccan nationalities. He was called up to the Morocco U23s in March 2023.

In June 2023, he was included in the final squad of the under-23 national team for the 2023 U-23 Africa Cup of Nations, hosted by Morocco itself, where the Atlas Lions won their first title and qualified for the 2024 Summer Olympics.

== Career statistics ==
As of match played 3 May 2026

Appearances and goals by club, season and competition
Club	Season	League			National cup (Note: Includes Coupe de France, Taça de Portugal)		League cup (Note: Includes Taça da Liga)		Europe		Total	
Club	Season	Division	Apps	Goals	Apps	Goals	Apps	Goals	Apps	Goals	Apps	Goals
FBBP	2020–21	CFA	19	1	—		—		—		19	1
FBBP	2021–22	CFA	20	6	—		—		—		20	6
FBBP	2022–23	CFA	12	3	—		—		—		12	3
FBBP	Total		51	10	—		—		—		51	10
Guingamp	2022–23	Ligue 2	23	7	0	0	—		—		23	7
Guingamp	2023–24	Ligue 2	38	11	1	0	—		—		39	11
Guingamp	Total		61	18	1	0	—		—		62	18
Braga	2024–25	Primeira Liga	33	7	4	0	1	0	13 (Note: Appearances in UEFA Europa League)	4	51	11
Braga	2025–26	Primeira Liga	13	2	2	0	0	0	9	0	24	2
Braga	Total		46	9	6	0	1	0	22	4	75	13
Career total			158	37	7	0	1	0	22	4	188	41

== Honours ==
Morocco U23

- U-23 Africa Cup of Nations: 2023
