= Jacques Siwe =

French footballer (born 2001)

Personal information
- Full name: Jacques-Julien Siwe
- Date of birth: 29 July 2001 (age 25)
- Place of birth: Saint-Maurice, France
- Height: 1.83 m (6 ft 0 in)
- Position: Forward

Team information
- Current team: Rubin Kazan
- Number: 43

Youth career
- Choisy-le-Roi
- –2018: Créteil

Senior career*
Years	Team	Apps	(Gls)
2018–2021	Dijon B	23	(3)
2021	Dijon	5	(0)
2021–2022	Annecy	10	(1)
2022–2023	Guingamp B	21	(5)
2022–2025	Guingamp	70	(14)
2025–	Rubin Kazan	31	(5)
- * Club domestic league appearances and goals as of 21 November 2026

Jacques-Julien Siwe (born 29 July 2001) is a French professional footballer who plays as a forward for Russian club Rubin Kazan.

== Career ==
On 6 January 2018, Siwe signed first professional contract with Dijon. He made his professional debut with the club in a 3–0 Ligue 1 loss to Monaco on 11 April 2021. On 25 June 2021, Siwe signed for Championnat National club Annecy.

On 11 September 2025, Siwe signed a four-year contract with Russian Premier League club Rubin Kazan.

== Personal life ==
Born in France, Siwe is of Cameroonian descent. His younger brother Telli is also a professional footballer.

== Career statistics ==
As of 21 November 2026

Club	Season	League			Cup		Other		Total	
Club	Season	Division	Apps	Goals	Apps	Goals	Apps	Goals	Apps	Goals
Créteil B	2017–18	Championnat National 3	0	0	–		–		0	0
Dijon B	2018–19	Championnat National 3	4	0	–		–		4	0
Dijon B	2019–20	Championnat National 3	13	1	–		–		13	1
Dijon B	2020–21	Championnat National 3	6	2	–		–		6	2
Dijon B	Total		23	3	0	0	0	0	23	3
Dijon	2020–21	Ligue 1	5	0	0	0	–		5	0
Annecy	2021–22	Championnat National	10	1	0	0	–		10	1
Guingamp B	2022–23	Championnat National 2	21	5	–		–		21	5
Guingamp	2022–23	Ligue 2	11	1	–		–		11	1
Guingamp	2023–24	Ligue 2	28	2	3	0	–		31	2
Guingamp	2024–25	Ligue 2	28	11	4	2	1 (Note: Appearance in promotion play-offs)	0	33	13
Guingamp	2025–26	Ligue 2	3	0	–		–		3	0
Guingamp	Total		70	14	7	2	1	0	78	16
Rubin Kazan	2025–26	Russian Premier League	19	2	4	0	–		23	2
Rubin Kazan	2026–27	Russian Premier League	12	3	3	2	–		15	5
Rubin Kazan	Total		31	5	7	2	0	0	38	7
Career total			160	28	14	4	1	0	175	32
