= Telli Siwe =

French footballer (born 2004)

Personal information
- Date of birth: 14 December 2004 (age 21)
- Place of birth: Saint-Maurice, France
- Position: Centre-back

Team information
- Current team: Auxerre
- Number: 13

Youth career
- 2010–2019: Choisy-le-Roi
- 2019–2021: Paris 13 Atletico
- 2021–2022: Fleury
- 2022–2023: Auxerre

Senior career*
Years	Team	Apps	(Gls)
2023–	Auxerre B	54	(2)
2025–	Auxerre	4	(0)
- * Club domestic league appearances and goals as of 20 May 2026

Telli Siwe (born 14 December 2004) is a French professional footballer who plays as a centre-back for Ligue 1 club Auxerre.

== Career ==
Having come through the ranks of Choisy-le-Roi, Paris 13 Atletico, and Fleury, Siwe joined the youth academy of Auxerre in 2022. On 16 February 2024, Siwe signed his first professional contract with Auxerre, a deal until June 2027. Ahead of the 2025–26 season, it was rumored in the press that he would be loaned out for the campaign. However, after a promising pre-season, he was kept in the first-team squad, and extended his contract to 2029 on 15 August 2025. On 13 September 2025, Siwe made his professional debut in a 2–1 Ligue 1 defeat to Monaco.

== Personal life ==
Born in France, Siwe is of Cameroonian descent. His older brother Jacques is also a professional footballer.
