= Kalidou Sidibé =

Malian footballer (born 1999)

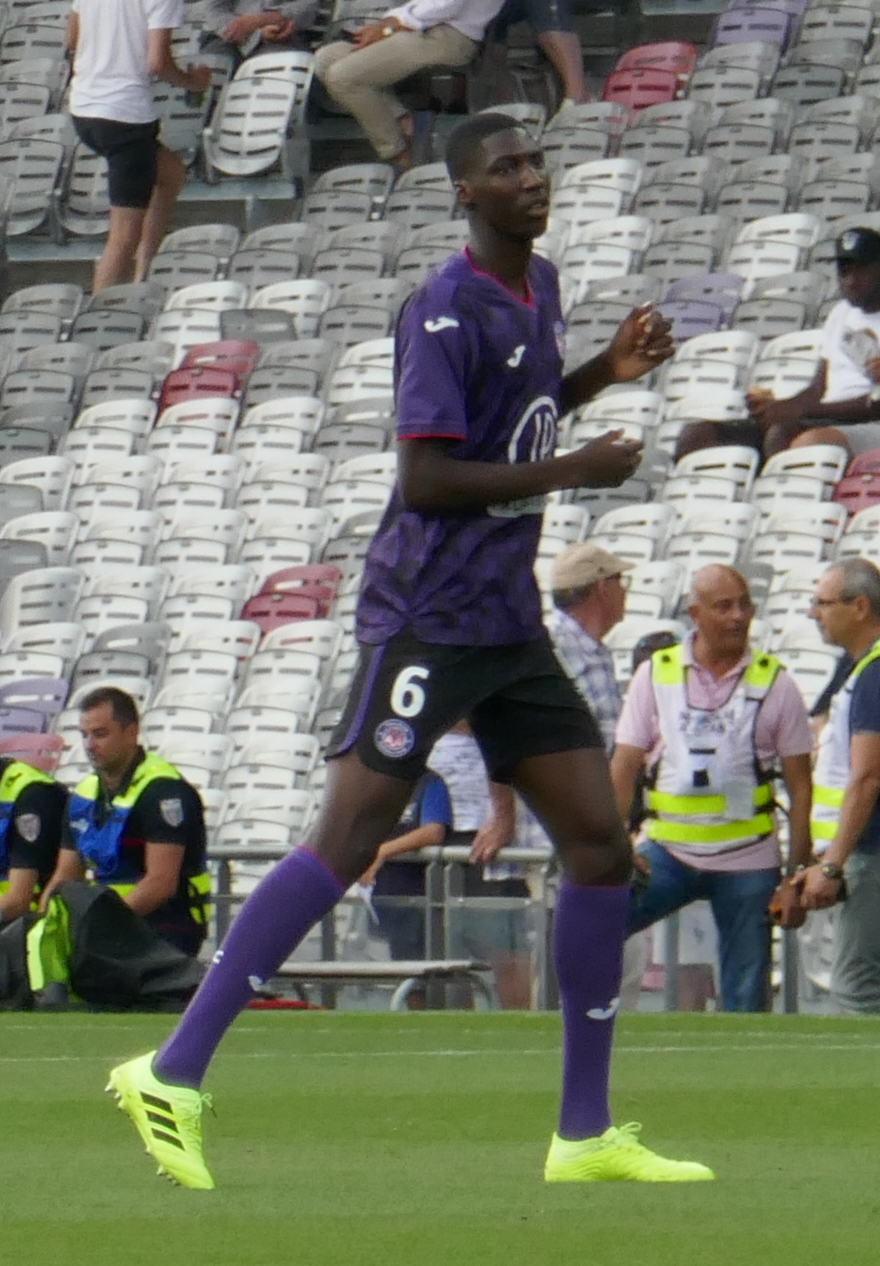
- Sidibé with Toulouse in August 2019

Personal information
- Date of birth: 28 January 1999 (age 27)
- Place of birth: Montreuil, France
- Height: 2.00 m (6 ft 7 in)
- Position: Midfielder

Team information
- Current team: Akhmat Grozny
- Number: 6

Youth career
- 2007–2008: Noisy Le Grand
- 2008–2011: Bry
- 2011–2014: Paris Saint-Germain
- 2014–2017: Paris FC

Senior career*
Years	Team	Apps	(Gls)
2016–2017	Paris FC II	12	(1)
2017–2022	Toulouse II	25	(1)
2018–2022	Toulouse	29	(1)
2021	→ Châteauroux (loan)	11	(1)
2021–2022	→ Quevilly-Rouen (loan)	27	(3)
2022–2023	Quevilly-Rouen	35	(1)
2023–2026	Guingamp	86	(5)
2026–	Akhmat Grozny	11	(1)

International career^{‡}
2026–	Mali	2	(0)
- * Club domestic league appearances and goals as of 21 November 2026 ‡ National team caps and goals as of 4 June 2026

Kalidou Sidibé (born 28 January 1999) is a professional footballer who plays as a midfielder for Russian Premier League club Akhmat Grozny. Born in France, Sidibé represents the Mali national team.

== Career ==
Sidibé was a youth product of various clubs in Paris, before moving to Toulouse in 2017. He made his professional debut with Toulouse in a 1–0 Coupe de la Ligue loss to Lorient on 31 October 2018.

On 23 August 2021, Sidibé moved on a season-long loan to Quevilly-Rouen. On 13 August 2022, he returned to Quevilly-Rouen on a two-year contract.

On 21 August 2023, Sidibé joined Guingamp on a three-year contract.

On 29 June 2026, Sidibé signed a three-year contract with Akhmat Grozny in Russia.

== International career ==
Sidibé was born in France and is of Malian descent, holding dual French and Malian citizenship. He was called up to the Mali national team for a set of friendlies in June 2025.

== Career statistics ==
=== Club ===
As of match played 21 November 2026

Appearances and goals by club, season and competition
Club	Season	League			Cup		League cup		Other		Total	
Club	Season	Division	Apps	Goals	Apps	Goals	Apps	Goals	Apps	Goals	Apps	Goals
Paris FC II	2016–17	National 3	12	0	—		—		—		12	0
Toulouse II	2017–18	National 3	15	1	—		—		—		15	1
Toulouse II	2018–19	National 3	5	0	—		—		—		5	0
Toulouse II	2019–20	National 3	4	0	—		—		—		4	0
Toulouse II	2020–21	National 3	1	0	—		—		—		1	0
Toulouse II	Total		25	1	—		—		—		25	1
Toulouse	2018–19	Ligue 1	20	1	3	0	1	0	—		24	1
Toulouse	2019–20	Ligue 1	4	0	0	0	1	0	—		5	0
Toulouse	2020–21	Ligue 2	4	0	1	0	—		—		5	0
Toulouse	Total		29	1	4	0	2	0	—		35	1
LB Châteauroux (loan)	2020–21	Ligue 2	11	0	—		—		—		11	0
Quevilly Rouen (loan)	2021–22	Ligue 2	27	3	3	2	—		2 (Note: Appearances in Ligue 1 relegation/promotion play-offs)	0	32	5
Quevilly Rouen	2022–23	Ligue 2	32	1	1	0	—		—		33	1
Quevilly Rouen	2023–24	Ligue 2	3	0	0	0	—		—		3	0
Quevilly Rouen	Total		35	1	1	0	—		—		36	1
Guingamp	2023–24	Ligue 2	26	2	2	1	—		—		28	3
Guingamp	2024–25	Ligue 2	31	1	5	1	—		1	0	37	2
Guingamp	2025–26	Ligue 2	29	2	1	0	—		—		30	2
Guingamp	Total		86	5	8	2	—		1	0	95	7
Akhmat Grozny	2026–27	Russian Premier League	11	1	3	0	—		—		14	1
Career total			235	12	19	4	2	0	3	0	259	16

=== International ===
As of match played 4 June 2026

Appearances and goals by national team and year
National team	Year	Apps	Goals
Mali	2026	2	0
Total		2	0
