= Mehdi Courgnaud =

French footballer (born 1990)

Personal information
- Date of birth: 21 November 1990 (age 35)
- Place of birth: Romorantin, France
- Height: 1.82 m (6 ft 0 in)
- Position: Forward

Team information
- Current team: FC Montlouis

Youth career
- 2003–2007: Romorantin

Senior career*
Years	Team	Apps	(Gls)
2007–2010	Romorantin	44	(9)
2010–2013	Dijon	15	(1)
2012	→ Arles-Avignon (loan)	8	(0)
2013–2015	White Star Bruxelles	22	(3)
2016–2018	Avoine OCC	36	(6)
2018–2019	FC Ouest Tourangeau	21	(7)
2019–2021	Avoine OCC	10	(2)
2021–	FC Montlouis	3	(0)
- * Club domestic league appearances and goals as of 18:54, 12 March 2022 (UTC)

Mehdi Courgnaud (born 21 November 1990) is a French professional footballer who plays as a forward for Championnat National 3 club FC Montlouis.

== Career ==
Courgnaud joined Dijon after beginning his career with hometown club Romorantin. He starred for his hometown for three seasons and had his best season in his final year with the club playing in the Championnat de France Amateur. He appeared in 26 league matches, scoring nine goals and issuing ten assists.

Following the campaign, Courgnaud was courted by several clubs in higher division, most notably Championnat National clubs Créteil and Orléans. However, in June 2010, it was announced by the media that Courgnaud had signed with second division club Dijon, alongside Sanaa Altama. Courgnaud began his career with Dijon playing on the club's reserve team. On 20 November 2010, a day before his 20th birthday, he made his professional debut in a Coupe de France match against amateur club Hayange. Courgnaud started the match and scored the fourth goal in an 8–0 victory.
