= Freddy Mbemba =

Congolese footballer

Freddy Mbebma
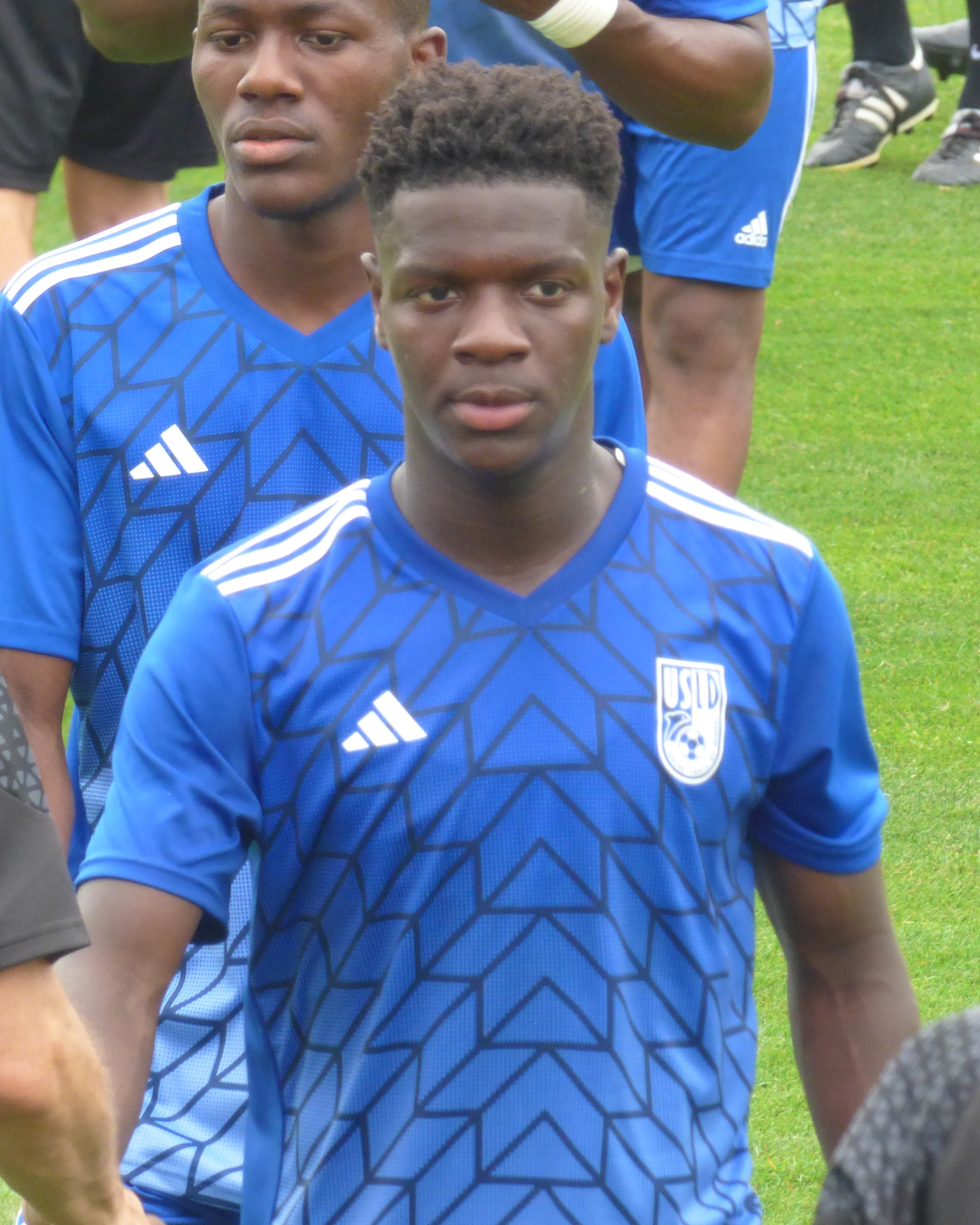
- Mbemba in 2023

Personal information
- Full name: Freddy Situmona Mbemba
- Date of birth: 20 December 2002 (age 23)
- Place of birth: Kinshasa, DR Congo
- Height: 1.75 m (5 ft 9 in)
- Position: Winger

Team information
- Current team: Charleroi
- Number: 20

Youth career
- Drancy

Senior career*
Years	Team	Apps	(Gls)
2021–2022	Drancy	1	(0)
2022–2024	Dunkerque	32	(4)
2023–2024	→ Nîmes (loan)	19	(6)
2024–2025	Versailles	31	(11)
2025–	Charleroi	2	(0)
2025–2026	→ Guingamp (loan)	24	(1)
- * Club domestic league appearances and goals as of 11 May 2026

Freddy Situmona Mbemba (born 16 December 2002) is a Congolese professional footballer who plays as a winger for Belgian Pro League club Charleroi.

== Career ==
Mbemba is a youth product of Drancy, and began his senior career with them in 2021 in the Championnat National 3 making one appearance. In the summer of 2022, he transferred to Dunkerque. In his debut season with them, he scored 4 goals in 30 matches and helped them come in second to achieve promotion into the Ligue 2.

On 1 September 2023, Mbemba joined Nîmes on loan. He was injured in his first game for Nîmes.

On 4 July 2025, Mbemba signed a three-year contract with Charleroi in Belgium. On 1 September 2025, Mbemba was loaned to Guingamp in Ligue 2 in France.

== Personal life ==
Mbemba was born in the DR Congo and moved to France at a young age.
