= Geoffrey Kondo =

French footballer (born 2002)

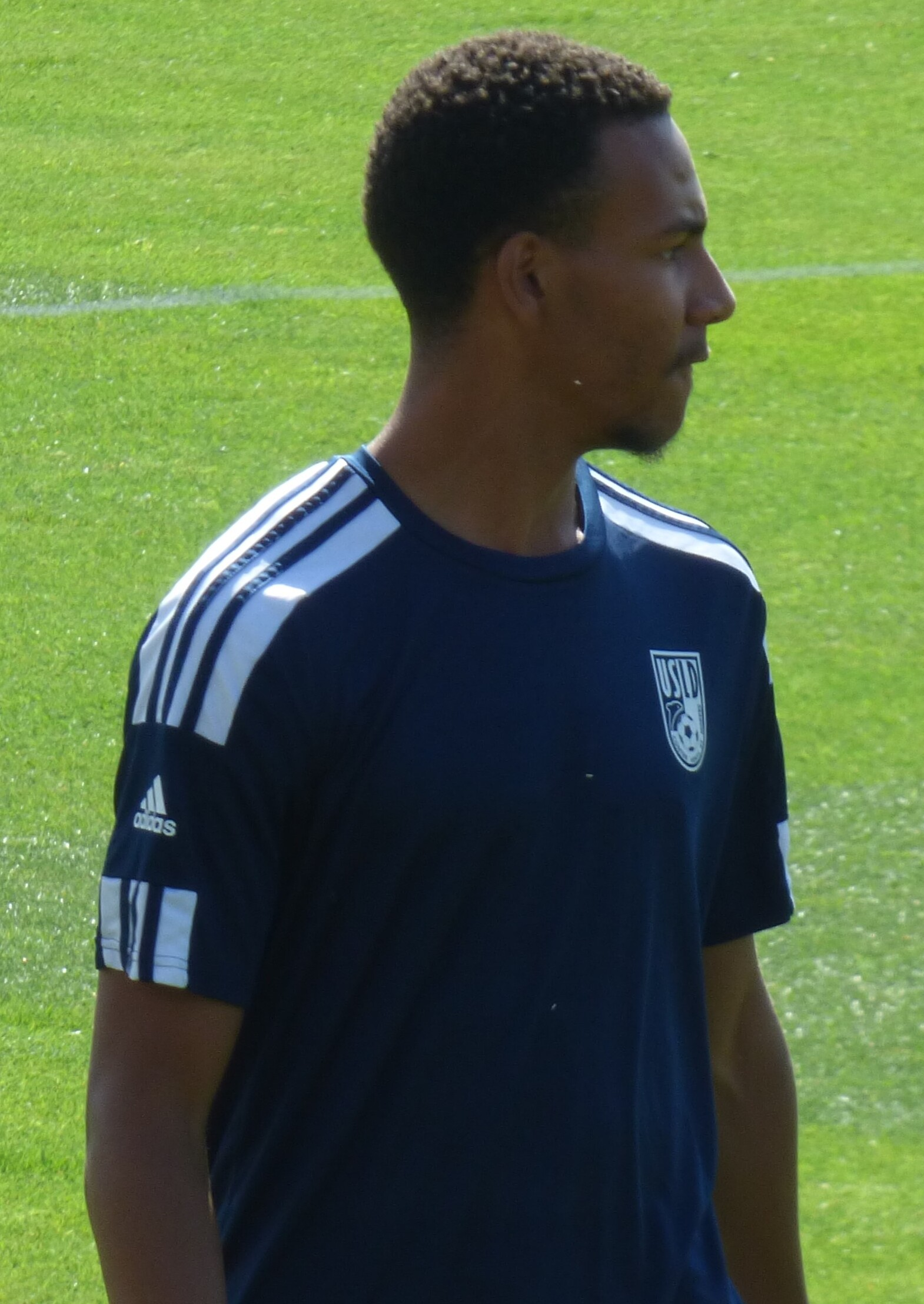
- Kondo in 2023

Personal information
- Full name: Geoffrey Kondo Seke Mabiala
- Date of birth: 2 May 2002 (age 24)
- Place of birth: Gagny, France
- Height: 1.80 m (5 ft 11 in)
- Position: Left-back

Team information
- Current team: Cercle Brugge
- Number: 24

Youth career
- 2006–2008: Boves
- 2008–2013: ES Cagny
- 2013–2021: US Camon

Senior career*
Years	Team	Apps	(Gls)
2021–2022	US Camon	8	(0)
2022–2026	Dunkerque	37	(1)
2023–2024	→ Furiani-Agliani (loan)	22	(2)
2026–	Cercle Brugge	10	(1)
- * Club domestic league appearances and goals as of 11 May 2026

Geoffrey Kondo Seke Mabiala (born 2 May 2002) is a French professional football player who plays as a left-back for Belgian Pro League club Cercle Brugge.

== Career ==
A youth product of his local club US Camon, Kondo began his senior career with them in 2021 in the Régional 1. On 22 June 2022, he transferred to Dunkerque in the Championnat National. He made his senior and professional debut with Dunkerque in a 3–0 Coupe de France win over SC Fouquières on 8 October 2022. On 31 June 2023 he joined Furiani-Agliani on a season-long loan in the Championnat National 2. On 30 January 2025, he extended his contract with Dunkerque until 2028.

On 27 January 2026, Kondo signed a three-and-a-half-year contract with Cercle Brugge in Belgium.

== Personal life ==
Born in France, Kondo is of DR Congolese descent.
