= Ángel Orelien =

Panamanian footballer (born 2001)

Personal information
- Full name: Ángel Gabriel Orelien González
- Date of birth: 2 April 2001 (age 25)
- Place of birth: Panama City, Panama
- Height: 1.69 m (5 ft 7 in)
- Position: Winger

Team information
- Current team: Sreenidi Deccan
- Number: 77

Youth career
- 2008–2016: Academia Bagoso
- 2016–2017: San Miguelito

Senior career*
Years	Team	Apps	(Gls)
2017–2019	San Miguelito	38	(2)
2019–2021	Cruz Azul	0	(0)
2020–2021	→ Cruz Azul Hidalgo (loan)	20	(5)
2021–2022	Plaza Amador	15	(2)
2022	Patriotas	5	(0)
2022–2023	Plaza Amador	27	(7)
2023	Hermanos Colmenarez	6	(0)
2023	San Miguelito	0	(0)
2023–2024	Dunkerque	16	(2)
2024–	Sreenidi Deccan	16	(5)

International career^{‡}
2017	Panama U17	4	(2)
2018–2019	Panama U20	8	(3)
2022–	Panama U23	9	(6)
2018–	Panama	3	(0)
- * Club domestic league appearances and goals as of 21:02, 2 March 2025 (UTC) ‡ National team caps and goals as of 13:53, 19 June 2023 (UTC)

Ángel Gabriel Orelien González (born 2 April 2001) is a Panamanian professional footballer who plays as a winger for I-League club Sreenidi Deccan.

== Club career ==
=== Early career ===
Born in Panama City, Orelien joined Academia Bagoso FC at the age of seven and moved to Sporting San Miguelito in 2016, aged 15. He made his first team debut – and Liga Panameña de Fútbol – with the latter on 25 March 2017, starting in a 1–1 home draw against Árabe Unido.

After only one appearance during the 2016–17 season, Orelien became a starter in the 2017–18 campaign, scoring his first senior goal on 16 September 2017 by netting the opener in a 2–2 away draw against Alianza.

=== Cruz Azul ===
In March 2019, it was announced that Orelien would move to Liga MX side Cruz Azul in July. The Mexican side confirmed the transfer on 28 March, and was assigned to the under-20 team upon arriving.

For the 2020–21 season, Orelien was assigned to reserve team Cruz Azul Hidalgo in Liga Premier de México. Despite being regularly used, he returned to Cruz Azul in June 2021, after Hidalgo were dissolved.

=== Plaza Amador ===
On 11 August 2021, Orelien returned to his home country after joining Plaza Amador for the Clausura tournament. He was a regular starter, scoring twice as the club reached the play-off semifinals.

=== Patriotas ===
On 4 January 2022, Orelien signed for Categoría Primera A side Patriotas Boyacá. He featured in the first five matches of the season before leaving on 11 February, after having discrepancies with the club.

=== Plaza Amador return ===
On 14 February 2022, Orelien returned to Plaza Amador for the remainder of the season. He was the club's third top scorer with seven goals, behind Ricardo Clarke and Ricardo Buitrago, as they reached the Clausura play-off semifinals.

=== Hermanos Colmenarez ===
On 17 January 2023, Orelien and compatriot Alexander González moved to Venezuelan Primera División side Hermanos Colmenarez. After just six matches, he left the club on 31 March, after having alleged unpaid wages.

=== Dunkerque ===
On 29 May 2023, Orelien agreed to a contract with his first club San Miguelito, but was announced at French Ligue 2 side Dunkerque on 14 July, on a two-year contract.

=== Sreenidi Deccan ===
In August 2024, Orelien signed with I-League club Sreenidi Deccan.

== International career ==
After representing Panama at under-17 level in the 2017 CONCACAF U-17 Championship and at under-20 level in the 2017 Central American Games, Orelien made his full international debut on 11 September 2018, coming on as a second-half substitute for Gabriel Torres in a 2–0 friendly loss to Venezuela in his hometown. He subsequently returned to the under-20s for the 2018 CONCACAF U-20 Championship and the 2019 FIFA U-20 World Cup.

Orelien also played with the under-23s in the 2022 and 2023 editions of the Maurice Revello Tournament, being named in the Best XI of the 2023 edition.

== Personal life ==
Orelien's father is French.

== Career statistics ==
=== Club ===
As of 4 January 2024

Appearances and goals by club, season and competition
Club	Season	League			Cup		Continental		Other		Total	
Club	Season	Division	Apps	Goals	Apps	Goals	Apps	Goals	Apps	Goals	Apps	Goals
San Miguelito	2016–17	Liga Panameña de Fútbol	1	0	—		—		—		1	0
San Miguelito	2017–18	Liga Panameña de Fútbol	21	1	—		—		—		21	1
San Miguelito	2018–19	Liga Panameña de Fútbol	16	1	—		—		—		16	1
San Miguelito	Total		38	2	—		—		—		38	2
Cruz Azul Hidalgo	2020–21	Liga Premier de México	20	5	—		—		—		20	5
Plaza Amador	2021	Liga Panameña de Fútbol	15	2	—		1 (Note: Appearance(s) in CONCACAF League)	0	—		16	2
Patriotas	2022	Categoría Primera A	5	0	—		—		—		5	0
Plaza Amador	2022	Liga Panameña de Fútbol	27	7	—		—		—		27	7
Hermanos Colmenarez	2023	Venezuelan Primera División	6	0	—		—		—		6	0
Dunkerque	2023–24	Ligue 2	16	2	2	0	—		—		18	2
Career total			107	13	2	0	1	0	0	0	110	13

=== International ===
As of 4 January 2024.

Appearances and goals by national team and year
National team	Year	Apps	Goals
Panama	2018	1	0
Panama	2019	1	0
Panama	2022	1	0
Total		3	0
