= Amine Hemia =

French footballer (born 1998)

Personal information
- Date of birth: 22 January 1998 (age 28)
- Place of birth: Saumur, France
- Height: 1.78 m (5 ft 10 in)
- Position: Midfielder

Team information
- Current team: Guingamp
- Number: 10

Youth career
- 2003–2013: Saumur
- 2013–2016: Angers
- 2016–2018: Avoine

Senior career*
Years	Team	Apps	(Gls)
2018–2021	Avoine	42	(14)
2021–2022	C'Chartres	29	(12)
2022–2024	Martigues	55	(16)
2024–	Guingamp	39	(12)
- * Club domestic league appearances and goals as of 2 December 2025 ‡ National team caps and goals as of 15:00, 13 August 2025 (UTC)

Amine Hemia (born 22 January 1998) is a French professional football player who plays as a midfielder for Ligue 2 club Guinamp.

== Career ==
Hemia is a product of the youth academies of Saumur, Angers, and Avoine. In 2018 he made his senior debut with Avoine in the Championnat National. In 2021, he moved to C'Chartres in the Championnat National 2, with 12 goals and 7 assists in 29 games in his one season there. In 2022, he moved to Martigues in the Championnat National where he spent 2 seasons. He was player of the month in the Championnat National in November 2022. On 29 May 2024, he transferred to Guinamp in Ligue 2 on a 3-year contract, his first professional contract.

== Personal life ==
Born in France, Hemia is of Algerian descent and holds dual French-Algerian citizenship.
