= Maxime Sivis =

Congolese footballer (born 1998)

Personal information
- Full name: Maxime James Sivis
- Date of birth: 1 April 1998 (age 28)
- Place of birth: Cholet, France
- Height: 1.80 m (5 ft 11 in)
- Position: Right-back

Team information
- Current team: Orenburg
- Number: 24

Youth career
- 2004–2013: Cholet
- 2013–2015: Angers

Senior career*
Years	Team	Apps	(Gls)
2016–2018	Angers B	34	(1)
2018–2019	Quevilly-Rouen B	8	(0)
2018–2019	Quevilly-Rouen	13	(0)
2019–2020	Concarneau	16	(0)
2020–2021	Red Star	20	(0)
2021–2024	Guingamp	81	(5)
2021	Guingamp B	1	(0)
2024–2026	Dinamo București	65	(2)
2026–	Orenburg	14	(0)

International career
2015	DR Congo U18	1	(0)
- * Club domestic league appearances and goals as of 21 November 2026

Maxime James Sivis (born 1 April 1998) is a professional footballer who plays as a right-back for Russian Premier League club Orenburg. Born in France, he represented DR Congo at under-18 level.

== Club career ==
Sivis is a product of the youth academies of Cholet and Angers, and began his senior career with the reserves of Angers. He couldn't find opportunities with the first team, so moved to Quevilly-Rouen in 2018. In the summer of 2019, he transferred to Concarneau. The following summer, he moved to Red Star in the Championnat National. On 7 June 2021, Sivis signed his first professional contract with Ligue 2 side En Avant Guingamp until 2024. He made his professional debut with Guingamp in a 2–1 Ligue 2 loss to Sochaux on 21 September 2021, scoring his side's only goal in the 45+2' minute.

On 24 July 2026, Sivis moved to Orenburg in Russia, becoming the first French player in club history.

== International career ==
Born in France, Sivis is of Congolese descent. He represented the DR Congo U18 side in a friendly 8–0 loss to the England U17s in October 2015.

== Career statistics ==
=== Club ===
As of match played 21 November 2026

Appearances and goals by club, season and competition
Club	Season	League			National cup (Note: Includes Coupe de France, Cupa României)		Other		Total	
Club	Season	Division	Apps	Goals	Apps	Goals	Apps	Goals	Apps	Goals
Angers B	2015–16	CFA 2	6	0	—		—		6	0
Angers B	2016–17	CFA 2	8	0	—		—		8	0
Angers B	2017–18	Championnat National 3	20	1	—		—		20	1
Angers B	Total		34	1	—		—		34	1
Quevilly-Rouen B	2018–19	Championnat National 3	8	0	—		—		8	0
Quevilly-Rouen	2018–19	Championnat National	13	0	—		—		13	0
Concarneau	2019–20	Championnat National	16	0	2	0	—		18	0
Red Star	2020–21	Championnat National	20	0	3	0	—		23	0
Guingamp B	2021–22	Championnat National 2	1	0	—		—		1	0
Guingamp	2021–22	Ligue 2	25	3	1	0	—		26	3
Guingamp	2022–23	Ligue 2	22	1	1	0	—		23	1
Guingamp	2023–24	Ligue 2	34	1	2	0	—		36	1
Guingamp	Total		81	5	4	0	—		85	5
Dinamo București	2024–25	Liga I	33	0	2	0	—		35	0
Dinamo București	2025–26	Liga I	31	2	4	0	1 (Note: Appearances in Liga I European play-offs)	0	36	2
Dinamo București	2026–27	Liga I	1	0	—		—		1	0
Dinamo București	Total		65	2	6	0	1	0	72	2
Orenburg	2026–27	Russian Premier League	14	0	2	0	—		16	0
Career total			252	8	17	0	1	0	270	8
