= Donatien Gomis =

Senegalese footballer (born 1994)

Personal information
- Date of birth: 7 November 1994 (age 32)
- Place of birth: Dakar, Senegal
- Height: 1.88 m (6 ft 2 in)
- Position: Centre-back

Team information
- Current team: Guingamp
- Number: 7

Youth career
- 2001–2009: Niort
- 2009–2012: Saint-Liguaire
- 2012–2013: Chauray
- 2013–2014: FC Saint-Cyr

Senior career*
Years	Team	Apps	(Gls)
2014–2017	Chauray	8	(0)
2017–2020	Angoulême	62	(5)
2020–2021	Les Herbiers	9	(2)
2021–2022	Concarneau	31	(2)
2022–	Guingamp	95	(8)
- * Club domestic league appearances and goals as of 11 May 2026

Donatien Gomis (born 7 November 1994) is a Senegalese professional footballer who plays as a centre-back for Guingamp.

== Career ==
Gomis moved from Senegal to France at the age of 6. He holds both Senegalese and French nationalities.

He began playing football at Niort, and thereafter played at the youth academies of Saint-Liguaire, Chauray and FC Saint-Cyr. He began his senior career with Chauray in 2015. He moved to Angoulême in 2017 where he played for three seasons. In 2021, he moved to Les Herbiers and the next year he moved to Concarneau in the 2021–22 season in the Championnat National on 15 June 2021. After a successful season as a starter, he moved to the Ligue 2 club Guingamp on 21 June 2022.

On 13 May 2023, Gomis refused to represent Guingamp in a Ligue 2 match against Sochaux due to the team uniforms featuring a rainbow-themed decoration as a part of a campaign against homophobia.

== Career statistics ==
As of match played on 23 November 2023

Club statistics
Club	Season	League			National Cup		Continental		Other		Total	
Club	Season	Division	Apps	Goals	Apps	Goals	Apps	Goals	Apps	Goals	Apps	Goals
Chauray	2014–15	Championnat de France Amateur 2	8	0	0	0	—		—		8	0
Angoulême	2017–18	Championnat National 3	22	0	3	0	—		—		25	0
Angoulême	2018–19	Championnat National 3	22	3	1	0	—		—		23	3
Angoulême	2019–20	Championnat National 2	18	2	4	0	—		—		22	2
Angoulême	Total		62	5	8	0	0	0	0	0	70	5
Les Herbiers	2020–21	Championnat National 2	9	2	3	0	—		—		12	2
Concarneau	2021–22	Championnat National	31	2	0	0	—		—		31	2
Guingamp	2022–23	Ligue 2	22	1	0	0	—		—		22	1
Guingamp	2023–24	Ligue 2	13	1	1	1	—		—		14	2
Guingamp	Total		35	2	1	1	0	0	0	0	36	3
Career totals			145	11	12	1	0	0	0	0	157	12
