= Hugo Picard =

French footballer (born 2003)

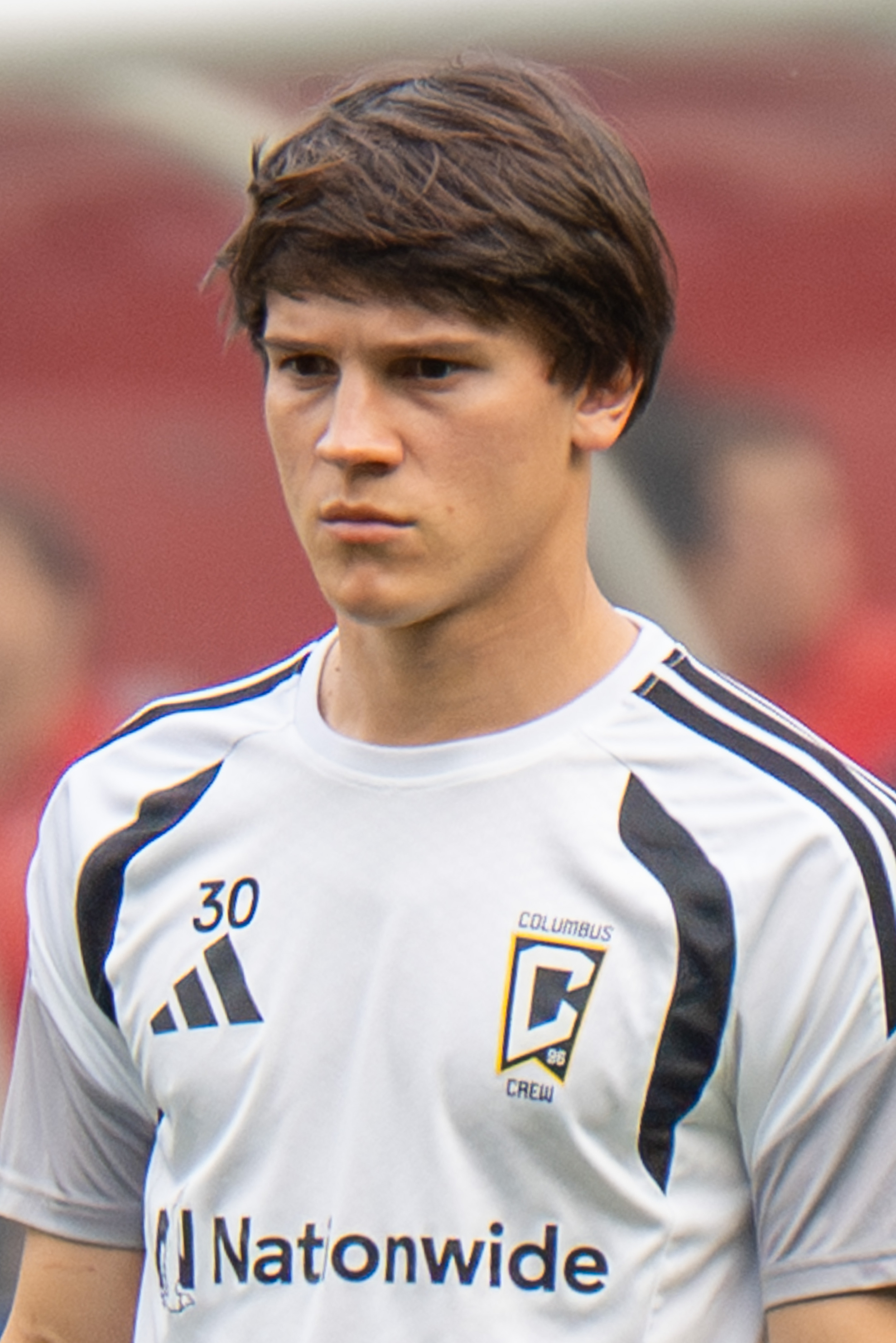
- Picard with Columbus Crew in 2026

Personal information
- Full name: Hugo Fabrice Thierry Picard
- Date of birth: 9 May 2003 (age 23)
- Place of birth: Cholet, France
- Height: 1.68 m (5 ft 6 in)
- Positions: Attacking midfielder; left winger

Team information
- Current team: Troyes (on loan from Columbus Crew)
- Number: 22

Youth career
- 2014–2015: Lorgeron-Torfou
- 2015–2019: Nantes
- 2019–2021: Guingamp

Senior career*
Years	Team	Apps	(Gls)
2021–2022	Guingamp II	15	(1)
2022–2025	Guingamp	92	(8)
2025–	Columbus Crew	26	(2)
2026–	→ Troyes (loan)	3	(0)
- * Club domestic league appearances and goals as of 6 September 2026

Hugo Fabrice Thierry Picard (born 9 May 2003) is a French professional footballer who plays as an attacking midfielder or left winger for Ligue 1 club Troyes on loan from Major League Soccer club Columbus Crew.

== Club career ==
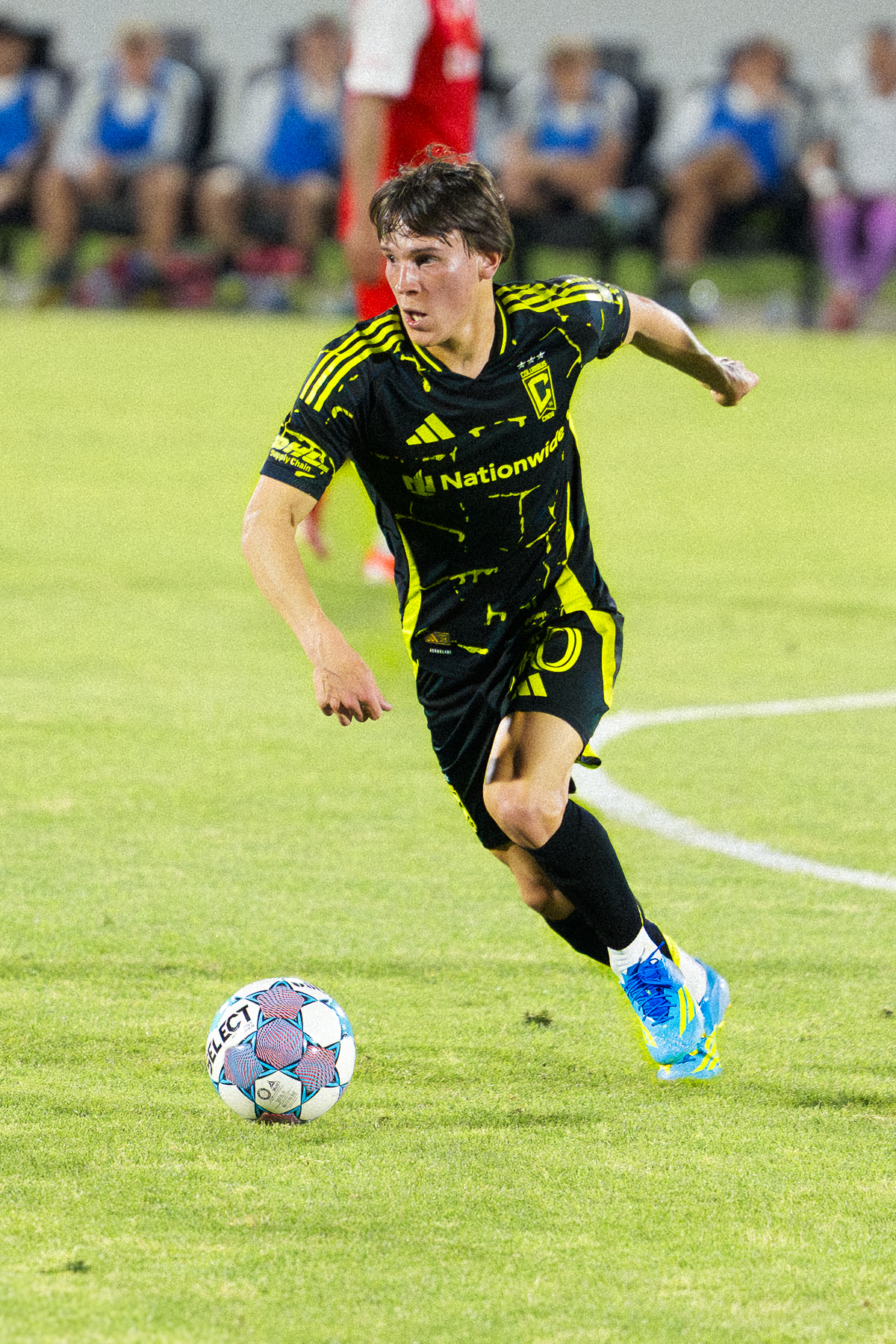
Picard with Columbus Crew in 2026

Picard began playing football with his local club Lorgeron-Torfou and was scouted as a U11 by Nantes. After being released by Nantes partly due to his slight build,

=== Guingamp ===
He moved to the youth academy of Guingamp in 2019, where he continued his development. He made his professional debut with Guingamp as a late substitute in a 4–0 Ligue 2 loss to Annecy on 8 October 2022. On 3 January 2023, he signed his first professional contract with the club until June 2026. Picard scored his first goal for Guingamp on 4 March 2023, during a league match against Paris FC. Starting the game, he opened the scoring with a curling shot into the top corner, helping his team secure the win. On 10 January 2025, he had three assists in a 4–1 victory against Annecy.

=== Columbus Crew ===
On 14 July 2025, Picard transferred to the Columbus Crew in Major League Soccer, signing a contract until 2028, with a one-year extension for 2029. He scored his first two goals for Columbus in a U.S. Open Cup victory versus USL League One club Richmond Kickers on 15 April 2026. He scored a further two goals in the following round of the U.S. Open Cup, against another USL League One club in One Knoxville SC. His second goal was the match winner, as he helped Columbus advance to their first quarterfinal berth since 2010. On 16 May, he scored his first league goal for Columbus. Following a free kick, the ball was deflected off an attempted clearance and fell to Picard, who controlled it outside of the box, before striking a powerful shot into the top-right corner of the net.

==== Loan to Troyes ====
On 17 August 2026, Picard joined Ligue 1 club Troyes with an option to buy.

== Style of play ==
A diminutive, right-footed player, Hugo Picard has primarily been deployed on the left flank at the professional level, a role that allows him to drift inside and operate in more central areas, where he functions more as a creator than a finisher. While progressing through the youth ranks, he primarily played as a central midfielder. Described as an "inspired dribbler and committed player," he has received praise for his creativity, energy, and tactical intelligence. Picard has described himself as a "false winger", preferring to move into central spaces rather than remain wide on the touchline.

== Personal life ==
Picard states Lionel Messi as his idol.
