= Nehemiah Fernandez =

French footballer (born 2004)

Personal information
- Full name: Nehemiah Basile Manuel Fernandez-Veliz
- Date of birth: 11 December 2004 (age 21)
- Place of birth: Stains, France
- Height: 1.85 m (6 ft 1 in)
- Position: Centre-back

Team information
- Current team: Nancy
- Number: 4

Youth career
- 2011–2017: AAS Sarcelles
- 2017–2023: Paris Saint-Germain

Senior career*
Years	Team	Apps	(Gls)
2023–2025	Dunkerque	20	(1)
2025–	Nancy	30	(1)

International career^{‡}
2019	France U16	2	(0)
2022	France U18	1	(0)
2022	France U19	3	(0)
2023	France U20	3	(0)
2026–	Congo	1	(0)
- * Club domestic league appearances and goals as of 12 May 2026 ‡ National team caps and goals as of 13 November 2026

Nehemiah Basile Manuel Fernandez-Veliz (born 11 December 2004) is a professional footballer who plays as a centre-back for Ligue 2 club Nancy. Born in France, he represents the Congo national team.

== Club career ==
Having grown up in Sarcelles, Val-d'Oise, Fernandez signed for the Paris Saint-Germain Academy in September 2016, joining from AAS Sarcelles. He signed his professional contract with the club on 2 June 2022, as he had already trained with Mauricio Pochettino's first team.

During the 2021–22 and 2022–23 seasons, Fernandez became a key member of the under-19 team, playing in the UEFA Youth League. He first appeared on the team sheet in Ligue 1 on 19 March 2023, being selected by Christophe Galtier for a home match against Rennes.

On 1 September 2023, Fernandez signed for Ligue 2 club Dunkerque on a two-year contract.

On 14 June 2025, Fernandez signed a two-season contract Nancy, also in Ligue 2.

== International career ==
A youth international for France, Fernandez first played for his country's under-16s, making his debut inb September 2019 during a friendly against Wales. He played his first and only game with the under-18s on 26 March 2022, starting in a 2–1 friendly win over the Netherlands, before stepping up to the under-19s.

Fernandez switched his allegiance to Congo in 2026 and made his debut for the Congo national team on 13 November 2026 in an AFCON qualifier against the Comoros.

== Style of play ==
Fernandez is described as a technically gifted ball-playing central defender, good at winning duels, and not bothered by their physicality.
