= Taylor Luvambo =

French association footballer (born 1999)

Personal information
- Date of birth: 5 July 1999 (age 27)
- Place of birth: Saint-Denis, France
- Height: 1.80 m (5 ft 11 in)
- Position: Winger

Team information
- Current team: Argeș Pitești
- Number: 92

Youth career
- 2009–2011: Racing CFF
- 2011–2012: Asnières
- 2012–2014: Paris Saint-Germain
- 2014–2015: Racing CFF
- 2015–2016: Nantes

Senior career*
Years	Team	Apps	(Gls)
2016–2020	Nantes B	62	(12)
2020–2021	Fleury	1	(0)
2021–2024	Guingamp B	34	(12)
2022–2025	Guingamp	51	(5)
2025–2026	Le Mans	9	(0)
2026–	Argeș Pitești	13	(1)

International career
2017	France U18	1	(0)
- * Club domestic league appearances and goals as of 31 October 2026

Taylor Luvambo (born 5 July 1999) is a French professional footballer who plays as a winger for Liga I club Argeș Pitești.

== Career ==
Luvambo is a product of the youth academies of Racing Paris, FC Asnières, Paris Saint-Germain and Nantes. He began his career with Nantes' reserves, before moving to Fleury for the 2020-21 season. He moved to the reserves of Guingamp in the summer of 2021, scoring 10 goals in 26 appearances in his debut season with them. On 10 June 2022, he signed a professional contract with Guignamp for 2 years. He made his senior debut with Guingamp in a 4–0 Ligue 2 win over Pau FC on 28 July 2022, providing 2 assists in the match.

On 23 June 2025, Luvambo signed with Le Mans, recently promoted to Ligue 2.

== International career ==
Born in France, Luvambo is of Congolese descent. He is a youth international for France, having represented the France U18s team in 2017.

== Career statistics ==
As of match played 31 October 2026

Appearances and goals by club, season and competition
Club	Season	League			National cup (Note: Includes Coupe de France, Cupa României)		Europe		Other		Total	
Club	Season	Division	Apps	Goals	Apps	Goals	Apps	Goals	Apps	Goals	Apps	Goals
Nantes B	2016–17	Championnat de France Amateur	14	2	—		—		—		14	2
Nantes B	2017–18	Championnat National 3	9	1	—		—		—		9	1
Nantes B	2018–19	Championnat National 2	19	4	—		—		—		19	4
Nantes B	2019–20	Championnat National 2	20	5	—		—		—		20	5
Nantes B	Total		62	12	—		—		—		62	12
Fleury	2020–21	Championnat National 2	1	0	0	0	—		—		20	5
Guingamp B	2021–22	Championnat National 2	26	10	—		—		—		26	10
Guingamp B	2022–23	Championnat National 2	6	2	—		—		—		6	2
Guingamp B	2023–24	Championnat National 2	2	0	—		—		—		2	0
Guingamp B	Total		34	12	—		—		—		34	12
Guingamp	2022–23	Ligue 2	10	1	1	0	—		—		11	1
Guingamp	2023–24	Ligue 2	14	0	1	0	—		—		15	0
Guingamp	2024–25	Ligue 2	27	4	4	2	—		0	0	31	6
Guingamp	Total		51	5	6	2	—		—		57	7
Le Mans	2025–26	Ligue 2	9	0	4	1	—		—		13	1
Argeș Pitești	2026–27	Liga I	13	1	2	1	—		—		15	2
Career total			170	30	12	4	—		0	0	182	34

== Honours ==
Nantes B

- Championnat National 3: 2017–18 (group B)
