= Sabone =

Sabone is a Central African surname. Notable people with the surname include:

- Abakar Sabone (born 1966), Central African politician
- Josias Sabone (born 2006), Central African footballer
