= Sacha M'Baka =

Central African Republic footballer

Personal information
- Full name: Sacha Tyron Darnell M'Baka
- Date of birth: 4 June 2004 (age 22)
- Place of birth: Angers, France
- Height: 1.89 m (6 ft 2 in)
- Position: Centre-back

Team information
- Current team: Caen
- Number: 4

Youth career
- Angers SCO

Senior career*
Years	Team	Apps	(Gls)
2022–2026	Stade Brest B	6	(0)
2026	Stade Poitevin	14	(0)
2026–	Caen	0	(0)

International career^{‡}
2024–	Central African Republic	2	(0)
- * Club domestic league appearances and goals as of 7 June 2026 ‡ National team caps and goals as of 7 June 2026

Sacha Tyron Darnell M'Baka (born 4 June 2004) is a footballer who plays as a centre back for Ligue 3 club Caen. Born in France, he plays for the Central African Republic national team.

== Club career ==
M'Baka developed through the youth academy of SCO Angers before joining Stade Brest, where he spent several seasons with the club's reserve side. He served as captain of the Brest B team in the Championnat National 3, making six appearances in the 2022–23 season. In January 2026, M'Baka signed for Stade Poitevin FC in the Championnat National 2. He made 14 appearances for Stade Poitevin in the 2025–26 season.

== International career ==
Born in France, M'Baka is of Central African descent and holds dual-citizenship. In November 2023, he received his first senior call-up to the Central African Republic, named in a 24-man squad by coach Raoul Savoy for 2026 World Cup qualifying fixtures. He went on to earn his first senior cap as a substitute in the AFCON qualifying fixture against Gabon on 18 November 2024, a match CAR lost 1–0.
