= 2022–23 Coupe de France preliminary rounds, Nouvelle-Aquitaine =

The 2022–23 Coupe de France preliminary rounds, Nouvelle-Aquitaine is the qualifying competition to decide which teams from the leagues of the Nouvelle-Aquitaine region of France take part in the main competition from the seventh round.

A total of thirteen teams will qualify from the Nouvelle-Aquitaine preliminary rounds.

In 2021–22, Bergerac Périgord FC progressed furthest in the main competition, reaching the quarter-final, where they lost to FC Versailles 78.

== Draws and fixtures ==
On 28 July 2022, the league confirmed that 680 teams from the region had entered the competition. On 29 July 2022, the league published the first round draw, with 284 ties featuring teams from Régional 2, Régional 3 and district divisions.

The second round draw was published on the leagues official Facebook page on 31 August 2022, with 189 ties including 94 teams entering from Régional 2 and Régional 1. The third round draw was published in the same place on 7 September 2022, with 100 ties including 11 teams entering from Championnat National 3. The fourth round draw was made live on the leagues official Facebook page on 16 September 2022, with the four teams from Championnat National 2 joining the competition. The fifth round draw was also made live on the leagues official Facebook page, on 30 September 2022. The sixth round draw was scheduled to be made live on Facebook on 10 October 2022, but due to a technical failure the full draw was published before the video was available.

=== First round ===
These matches were played on 26, 27 and 28 August 2022, with one replayed on 3 September 2022.

First round results: Nouvelle Aquitaine
Tie no	Home team (tier)	Score	Away team (tier)
1.	Landes Girondines FC (10)	6–4	FC Parentis (8)
2.	FC Médoc Océan (9)	1–1 (6–5 p)	FC Martignas-Illac (8)
3.	FC Airvo Saint-Jouin (9)	1–3	AS Valdivienne (10)
4.	US Mélusine (10)	1–1 (4–3 p)	FC Comores Bressuire (10)
5.	FC Rouillé (10)	3–1	CEP Poitiers (10)
6.	US Envigne (10)	0–4	FC Vrines (8)
7.	SL Cenon-sur-Vienne (11)	3–2	ES Fayenoirterre (11)
8.	FC Oloronais (9)	3–0	Saint-Perdon Sports (9)
9.	AS Pontonx (8)	1–1 (2–4 p)	AS Tarnos (8)
10.	US Saint-Palais Amikuze (9)	5–1	FC Born (9)
11.	US Armagnac (11)	0–1	SC Arthez Lacq Audejos (8)
12.	Labenne OSC (8)	3–0 (Note: Tie won by means of forfeit.)	FC Luy de Béarn (8)
13.	Seignosse-Capbreton-Soustons FC (8)	3–0	Violette Aturine (8)
14.	FC Espagnol Pau (11)	1–2	FC Roquefort Saint-Justin (10)
15.	Association Saint-Laurent Billère (9)	0–3	JA Dax (7)
16.	US Pons (10)	0–2	AS Merpins (7)
17.	US Pont l'Abbé d'Arnoult (11)	6–0	AS Mosnac (12)
18.	FC Portes d'Océan 17 (9)	2–3	Alliance Foot 3B (8)
19.	Ile d’Oléron Football (9)	4–1	JS Grande Champagne (10)
20.	US Saujon (10)	7–0{	SL Châteaubernard (11)
21.	ES Thénacaise (11)	2–2 (4–3 p) (Note: Tie reversed from original draw.)	ES Bramerit (11)
22.	US Aulnay (10)	0–2	ALFC Fontcouverte (9)
23.	Aviron Boutonnais (8)	0–4	Capaunis ASPTT FC (8)
24.	US Aigrefeuille (9)	0–2	DR Boucholeurs-Châtelaillon-Yves (10)
25.	AS Maritime (8)	1–2	AS Aiffres (8)
26.	US Frontenay-Saint-Symphorien (9)	1–0	La Jarrie FC (9)
27.	ES Tonnacquoise-Lussantaise (10)	0–0 (4–5 p)	US Mauzé-sur-le-Mignon (9)
28.	Canton Aunis FC (11)	0–3	AS Cabariot (8)
29.	US La Crèche (10)	1–3	US Pays Maixentais (8)
30.	US Auzances (9)	2–1	ES Nieul-Saint-Gence (10)
31.	ASPTT Limoges (11)	0–1 (Note: Original match abandoned at half time due to floodlight failure. Replayed on 3 September 2022.)	US Nantiat (10)
32.	US Le Dorat (11)	1–1 (2–4 p)	AC Kurdes Limoges (10)
33.	Avenir Bellac-Berneuil-Saint-Junien-les-Combes (9)	0–2	AF Portugais Limoges (7)
34.	Avenir Nord Foot 87 (10)	5–4	ES Bénévent-Marsac (9)
35.	AS Payroux Charroux Mauprévoir (11)	2–3	ES Brûlain (10)
36.	Entente Saint-Maurice-Gençay (11)	3–1	Valence-en-Poitou OC (11)
37.	AS Périgné (11)	1–1 (5–4 p)	AS Civaux (10)
38.	AS Seilhac (10)	0–3	EF Aubussonnais (8)
39.	AS Côteaux Dordogne (10)	1–0	Union Saint-Médard Petit-Palais (9)
40.	AS Villandraut-Préchac (11)	0–3	US Vallée de Garonne (10)
41.	FCA Moron (8)	1–2	SC Cadaujac (8)
42.	Bouliacaise FC (10)	2–2 (5–4 p)	ES Fronsadaise (9)
43.	Fraternelle Landiras (10)	0–1	Montpon-Ménesplet FC (8)
44.	SA Sanilhacois (9)	3–0	Olympique Larche Lafeuillade (9)
45.	FREP Saint-Germain (10)	1–1 (4–5 p)	Périgueux Foot (9)
46.	FC Thenon-Limeyrat-Fossemagne (8)	1–0	ASPO Brive (8)
47.	Entente Perpezac Sadroc (9)	5–2	Varetz AC (10)
48.	CA Brignac (11)	0–6	FC Sarlat-Marcillac (7)
49.	Auvézère Mayne FC (9)	2–3	ES Nonards (8)
50.	US Pays de Fénelon (10)	2–2 (4–5 p)	ASV Malemort (9)
51.	Nersac FC (10)	1–3	FC Confolentais (8)
52.	AJ Montmoreau (10)	1–8	AS Puymoyen (8)
53.	ES Montignac 16 (11)	2–0	AS Chazelles (10)
54.	JS Basseau Angoulême (9)	3–2	FC Canton d'Oradour-sur-Vayres (10)
55.	AS Brie (9)	1–1 (3–2 p)	FC Saint-Brice-sur-Vienne (10)
56.	FC Charentais L'Isle-d'Espagnac (11)	0–3	La Roche/Rivières FC Tardoire (8)
57.	FC Pays Arédien (10)	2–2 (6–5 p)	AS Saint-Yrieix (8)
58.	US Oradour-sur-Glane (11)	1–2	CS Saint-Angeau (11)
59.	AS Soyaux (8)	4–0	FC Saint-Priest-sous-Aixe (9)
60.	US Châteauneuf 16 (11)	0–12	ASFC Vindelle (8)
61.	AS Bel-Air (10)	4–0	Fontafie FC (11)
62.	FC Chaillac Saillat (11)	0–3	FC des 2 Vallées (9)
63.	FC Roullet-Saint-Estèphe (8)	0–1	CA Brantômois (9)
64.	US Chasseneuil (10)	3–1	CS Saint-Michel-sur-Charente (9)
65.	FC Casteljaloux (9)	0–1	Patronage Bazadais (8)
66.	AS Marcellus-Cocumont (10)	0–2	FC Vallée du Lot (8)
67.	JS Teichoise (10)	1–2	AS Le Taillan (8)
68.	USJ Saint-Augustin Club Pyrénées Aquitaine (10)	0–5	Stade Pessacais UC (10)
69.	Cazaux Olympique (9)	2–0	SJ Macaudaise (9)
70.	Haillan Foot 33 (11)	1–2	FC Arsac-Pian Médoc (8)
71.	Parempuyre FC (11)	1–2	Coqs Rouges Bordeaux (8)
72.	FC Pierroton Cestas Toctoucau (11)	0–3	Bordeaux Étudiants CF (9)
73.	US Ludon (11)	2–4	ES Bruges (10)
74.	AS Avensan-Moulis-Listrac (11)	0–7	ES Eysinaise (9)
75.	US Saint-Germain-d'Esteuil (11)	2–2 (4–1 p)	CS Portugais Villenave-d'Ornon (9)
76.	Pessac FC (12)	3–3 (2–3 p)	AG Vendays-Montalivet (10)
77.	Sporting Chantecler Bordeaux Nord le Lac (8)	0–5	CS Lantonnais (8)
78.	AGJA Caudéran (10)	0–3	Biscarrosse OFC (8)
79.	AS Saint-Aubin-de-Médoc (10)	1–5	FC Belin-Béliet (8)
80.	USC Léognan (10)	6–1	Union Pauillac Saint-Laurent (10)
81.	Union Saint-Jean (10)	1–6 (Note: ES Audenge penalised for fielding a suspended player, Union Saint-Jean qualify.)	ES Audenge (7)
82.	RC Bordeaux Métropole (8)	1–3	Montesquieu FC (8)
83.	CA Sallois (8)	3–0	FC Barpais (8)
84.	ES Canéjan (11)	0–10	Stade Blayais (10)
85.	ES Boismé Clessé (12)	0–1	FC Chiché (11)
86.	SC Vouzailles (13)	1–3	Croutelle FC (12)
87.	US Cissé (12)	0–2	FC Clazay Bocage (11)
88.	US Brion 79 (11)	1–5	Antran SL (9)
89.	CA Saint-Aubin-le-Cloud (9)	3–1	US Saint-Varent Pierregeay (8)
90.	US Vrère-Saint-Léger-de-Montbrun (10)	0–2	ES Nouaillé (8)
91.	ES Saint-Amand-sur-Sèvre (11)	1–1 (5–4 p)	FC Montamisé (10)
92.	ASC Portugais Parthenay et de Gâtine (12)	1–5	ES Château-Larcher (9)
93.	Espérance Terves (9)	0–0 (9–8 p)	AS Sèvres-Anxaumont (10)
94.	FC Thouet (13)	0–3	Ozon FC (8)
95.	FC Chanteloup-Courlay-Chapelle (10)	4–2	FC Smarves Iteuil (9)
96.	Buslaurs Thireuil (10)	2–1	FC Pays de l'Ouin (8)
97.	US Vergentonnaise (12)	2–0	Espérance Availles-en-Châtellerault (11)
98.	ES Aubinrorthais (8)	3–2	ES Saint-Benoit (8)
99.	SC L'Absie-Largeasse/Moutiers-sous-Chantmerle (11)	2–4	US Vicq-sur-Gartempe (8)
100.	FC Saint-Jean-Missé (11)	2–2 (4–3 p)	US Vasléenne (10)
101.	ASA Couronneries (11)	0–8	Inter Bocage FC (9)
102.	Union Cernay-Saint-Genest (11)	1–3	AS Colombiers (12)
103.	CS Dissay (12)	0–4	AS Saint-Léger Montbrillais (11)
104.	AS Breuil-Bernard (12)	0–2	CO Cerizay (8)
105.	Amicale Coussay-les-Bois (12)	2–2 (7–6 p)	ACS Mahorais 79 (11)
106.	FC Jardres (12)	0–5	FC Autize (9)
107.	US Mirebeau (11)	3–1	AS Portugais Cerizay (10)
108.	US Leigné-sur-Usseau (12)	1–6	ES Saint-Cerbouillé (8)
109.	FC Fleuré (10)	12–0	US Roches-La Villedieu (13)
110.	Chasseneuil-Saint-Georges FC (9)	1–1 (3–4 p)	FC Loudun (10)
111.	ES Louzy (10)	3–2	US Avanton (10)
112.	Biard FC (11)	3–1	US Nord Vienne (9)
113.	Boivre SC (11)	0–2	Gati-Foot (9)
114.	US Thuré-Besse (10)	2–0	AS Portugais Châtellerault (8)
115.	US Jaunay-Marigny (10)	0–2	ES Oyré-Dangé (9)
116.	JS Nieuil l'Espoir (8)	4–0	ES Pays Thénezéen (10)
117.	AS Coulonges-Thouarsais (11)	2–3	AS Ingrandes-sur-Vienne (10)
118.	FC Vouneuil-sous-Biard-Béruges (10)	1–0	US Champdeniers-Pamplie (11)
119.	FC Plaine Gâtine (12)	1–1 (1–3 p)	ES Trois Cités Poitiers (9)
120.	AS Poitiers Gibauderie Mahorais (11)	2–2 (4–2 p)	ES Châtillon Pompaire (12)
121.	ES La Pallu (11)	1–1 (5–4 p)	ES Beaulieu-Breuil (10)
122.	CL Noirlieu-Chambroutet Bressuire (11)	0–0 (2–0 p)	Entente Voulmentin-Saint-Aubin-du-Plain-La Coudre (11)
123.	ES Lutaizien-Oiron (12)	0–2	US Vivonne (11)
124.	SA Mauzé-Rigné (12)	0–8	AAS Saint-Julien-l'Ars (10)
125.	AS Ouzilly (13)	1–10	FC Sud Gâtine (10)
126.	RC Dax (11)	1–5	Union Jurançonnaise (8)
127.	FC Labouheyre (10)	1–6	Elan Boucalais (8)
128.	FC Morcenx-Arengosse (9)	1–8	FA Morlaàs Est Béarn (7)
129.	FC Lons (8)	0–0 (6–5 p)	FC Hagetmautien (8)
130.	Papillons de Pontacq (10)	2–2 (0–3 p)	US Garein (10)
131.	FC Vallée de l'Ousse (9)	1–2	AS Bretagne-de-Marsan (9)
132.	Avenir Mourenxois (9)	4–1	FC Lacajunte-Tursan (10)
133.	Baiona FC (10)	1–2	Pardies Olympique (8)
134.	Chalosse FC (10)	1–3	Les Labourdins d'Ustaritz (8)
135.	Kanboko Izarra (11)	4–1	Étoile Béarnaise FC (11)
136.	Rivehaut Sport (11)	0–3	SA Saint-Séverin (9)
137.	US Castétis-Gouze (9)	3–3 (4–3 p)	AS des Églantines de Hendaye (9)
138.	FC Artiguelouve-Arbus-Aubertin (10)	11–0	FC Escource (11)
139.	AS Lous Marous/FC Saint-Geours (9)	1–2	FC La Ribère (8)
140.	AL Poey-de-Lescar (8)	2–0	FC Saint-Martin-de-Seignanx (8)
141.	ES Bournos-Doumy-Garlède (10)	3–4	FC Mées (11)
142.	Espérance Oeyreluy (11)	1–2	AS Artix (8)
143.	Carresse Salies FC (10)	1–1 (2–3 p)	ES Meillon-Assat-Narcastet (8)
144.	Peyrehorade SF (10)	0–4	Hasparren FC (8)
145.	FA Bourbaki Pau (9)	0–1	ES Montoise (8)
146.	Ardanavy FC (10)	2–2 (0–3 p)	FC Saint-Vincent-de-Paul (8)
147.	Monein FC (11)	2–16	ES Nay-Vath-Vielha (9)
148.	Entente Haut Béarn (11)	0–3	US Marsan (9)
149.	CF Crouin (13)	0–6	FC Sévigné Jonzac-Saint-Germain (8)
150.	AS Néré (12)	1–1 (3–1 p)	ES Javrezac Jarnouzeau (11)
151.	US Saint-Maigrin (12)	0–3	AL Saint-Brice (10)
152.	Saint-Hilaire FC (11)	0–3	Saint-Palais SF (8)
153.	EFC Vallée du Coran (11)	0–0 (3–4 p)	UC Antenne (11)
154.	AS Argenteuil Angerien Poursay-Garnaud (11)	1–4	Avenir Matha (8)
155.	US La Gémoze (10)	9–0	US Lidonnaise (11)
156.	FC Léoville (10)	1–4	US Marennaise (8)
157.	Amicale Saint-Martin (11)	0–2	ACS La Rochelle (10)
158.	ASS Portugais La Rochelle (11)	7–2	FC Nord 17 (9)
159.	AR Cherveux (11)	0–1	US Pexinoise Niort (12)
160.	Espoir Haut Vals de Saintonge (10)	1–4	Aunis AFC (8)
161.	Stade Boisseuillais (11)	3–2	AS Andilly (11)
162.	Breuil-Magné FC (10)	0–3	AS Réthaise (7)
163.	FC Atlantique (11)	11–2	ES Mougon (11)
164.	SA Niort Souché (11)	0–2	AAAM Laleu-La Pallice (8)
165.	FC Canton de Courçon (11)	2–0	Avenir 79 FC (8)
166.	AS Sainte-Ouenne (13)	3–1	ASPTT Bessines (11)
167.	Stade Vouillé (8)	1–1 (5–6 p)	AS Échiré Saint-Gelais (7)
168.	AS Saint-Christophe 17 (10)	1–2	FC Essouvert Loulay (10)
169.	CS Beauvoir-sur-Niort (10)	6–0	AS Vérines (11)
170.	AS Augé/Azay-le-Brûlé (12)	0–3	CS Venise Verte (11)
171.	US Ajain (11)	1–9	USA Compreignac (9)
172.	AS Ambazac (9)	2–1	US Versillacoise (10)
173.	US Saint-Vaury (9)	0–4	ES Limoges (9)
174.	US Saint-Fiel (9)	0–0 (3–5 p)	Limoges Landouge (8)
175.	AC Turques Limoges (11)	0–4	CA Rilhac-Rancon (8)
176.	Diables Bleus Bersac (11)	1–5	JS Lafarge Limoges (7)
177.	Alouette FC Rive Gauche Limoges (10)	2–5	AS Saint-Sulpice-le-Guérétois (8)
178.	US Solignac Le Vigen (11)	0–7	CA Peyrat-la-Nonière (8)
179.	RFC Sainte-Feyre (9)	2–1	US Saint-Léonard-de-Noblat (8)
180.	FC des Enclaves et du Plateau (10)	2–1	JS Laluque-Rion (10)
181.	ES Evaux-Budelière (9)	0–2	Limoges Football (8)
182.	US Leignes-sur-Fontaine (10)	0–0 (4–1 p)	US Bessines-Morterolles (8)
183.	FC Vallée du Salleron (12)	2–1	Vigenal FC Limoges (8)
184.	US Beaune-les-Mines (10)	3–0	US Grand-Bourg (11)
185.	JS Chambon-sur-Voueize (10)	1–0	SA Le Palais-sur-Vienne (7)
186.	AS Saint-Jouvent (11)	0–2	AS Lussac-les-Églises (11)
187.	FC Fursac (10)	2–0	Espoirs La Geneytouse (9)
188.	ES Nouic Mézières (12)	0–6	ACG Foot Sud 86 (10)
189.	ÉS Romaine (12)	1–6	Val de Boutonne Foot 79 (10)
190.	FC Valence-en-Poitou Couhé (12)	0–9	AS Pays Mellois (8)
191.	US Abzac (11)	1–2	FC Boutonnais (10)
192.	AS Saint-Saviol (12)	1–12	ES Celles-Verrines (8)
193.	ES Lavoux-Liniers (11)	1–4 (Note: FC Pays Argentonnais penalised for attempting to continue the game with eleven players following the sending off of their goalkeeper, ES Lavoux-Liniers qualify.)	FC Pays Argentonnais (9)
194.	US Lezay (11)	1–1 (4–3 p)	OC Sommières Saint-Romain (11)
195.	FC Haut Val de Sèvre (11)	0–5	SC Verrières (9)
196.	AS Blanzay (13)	0–9	AS Saint-Martin-lès-Melle (10)
197.	FC Saint-Maurice/Manot (12)	2–2 (3–4 p)	ES Clussais (11)
198.	ES Brion-Saint-Secondin (10)	1–1 (2–4 p)	FC Usson-Isle (8)
199.	US Lessac (9)	0–2	Stade Ruffec (8)
200.	Taizé-Aizie Les Adjots (12)	0–1	ES Élan Charentais (11)
201.	AS Exoudun (12)	2–4	Entente Nanteuil-Verteuil (11)
202.	ES Soursac (11)	1–5	CA Chamboulive (9)
203.	FC Saint-Jal (11)	0–3	AS Châteauneuf-Neuvic (8)
204.	AS Saint-Martial-de-Gimel (11)	0–1	USS Mérinchal (9)
205.	Entente des Barrages de la Xaintrie (11)	0–4	Occitane FC (9)
206.	RC Saint-Exupéry (11)	0–0 (4–3 p) (Note: RC Saint-Exupéry penalised for fielding an unlicensed player, ES Ussel qualify.)	ES Ussel (9)
207.	ES La Croisille-Linards (11)	2–1	FC Saint-Angel (12)
208.	SC Flayat (10)	0–5	AS Maussacoise (10)
209.	US Saint-Clementoise (10)	0–1	CA Meymac (8)
210.	AS Marcillac Clergoux (11)	0–3	FC Argentat (8)
211.	AS Eymoutiers (10)	2–0	FC Cornilois-Fortunadais (9)
212.	AS Turcs Ussel (10)	6–1	US Vallière (10)
213.	AS Pellegrue (10)	5–3	FCC Créonnais (10)
214.	FC Saint-Antoine (11)	0–1	US Farguais (10)
215.	AS Sauveterrienne (11)	1–4	FC Ambès (11)
216.	SC Bédenac Laruscade (11)	0–3	US Nord Gironde (10)
217.	US Artiguaise (10)	7–0	US Cercoux Clottaise (11)
218.	CA Carbon-Blanc (10)	0–1	CMO Bassens (8)
219.	FC Cubnezais (11)	2–5	Étoile La Roche-Chalais (10)
220.	FC Sud Charente (10)	1–4	US Coutras (10)
221.	CM Floirac (11)	4–4 (4–2 p)	Saint-Seurin Saint-Estèphe FC (11)
222.	ES Mazères-Roaillan (11)	2–4	AS Gensac-Montcaret (8)
223.	SC Bastidienne (10)	0–5	FC Sud 17 (9)
224.	Saint-Seurin JC (11)	0–9	ES Ambares (9)
225.	US Lagorce (11)	1–5	RC Chambéry (9)
226.	CA Castets-en-Dorthe (10)	2–0	FC Rive Droite 33 (8)
227.	SC Saint-Symphorien (10)	3–2	US Saint-Denis-de-Pile (9)
228.	AS Beautiran FC (11)	0–6	FC Loubesien (8)
229.	FC Vallée de la Dordogne (10)	1–3	CA Ribéracois (8)
230.	Athletic 89 FC (9)	4–1	Entente Saint-Séverin/Palluaud (10)
231.	AS Pays de Montaigne et Gurçon (9)	7–0	AS Lusitanos Cenon (9)
232.	AS Pugnac (10)	12–0	Bleuets Macariens (11)
233.	AC Sud Saintonge (10)	2–4	FC Côteaux Libournais (8)
234.	FC Limeuil (9)	2–1	CS Allassac (9)
235.	AS Saint-Viance (10)	0–9	FC Périgord Centre (8)
236.	ES Montignacoise (10)	2–1	Amicale Saint-Hilaire Venersal (9)
237.	US Tocane-Saint-Apre (11)	0–5	US Lanteuil (9)
238.	US Annesse-et-Beaulieu (11)	0–6	Entente SR3V (9)
239.	FCE Périgord Fénelon (11)	0–9	US Chancelade/Marsac (8)
240.	FC Belvès (12)	0–0 (3–5 p)	APCS Mahorais Brive (10)
241.	Cosnac FC (11)	1–5	CO Coulouniex-Chamiers (8)
242.	Condat FC (10)	0–2	SS Sainte-Féréole (8)
243.	Rouffignac OC (11)	5–1	AS Collonges Chauffour (11)
244.	JS Castellevequoise (10)	8–2	FC Cublac (11)
245.	USA Terrasson (10)	0–2	Athlético Vernois (9)
246.	FC Bassimilhacois (9)	3–1	FC Objat (10)
247.	Les Aiglons Razacois (10)	1–0	ES Ussac (10)
248.	FC Atur (10)	2–1	AS Beynat (8)
249.	AS Coursac (11)	3–4	AS Jugeals-Noailles (8)
250.	US Marsaneix Manoire (11)	3–3 (3–1 p)	Entente Périgord Noir (10)
251.	US La Roche l'Abeille (10)	2–0	US Anais (11)
252.	La Thibérienne (9)	5–2	US Veyrac (10)
253.	FC La Tour Mareuil Verteillac (8)	0–0 (3–4 p)	AS Nexon (9)
254.	FC Brigueiul (11)	0–1	AS Saint-Junien (8)
255.	US Ma Campagne Angoulême (10)	2–4	ES Linars (10)
256.	CA Saint-Victurnien (11)	1–8	ES Champniers (9)
257.	Rochechouart OC (11)	0–0 (5–6 p)	OFC Ruelle (8)
258.	AS Aigre (10)	9–1	US Feuillardiers (11)
259.	SC Séreilhac (11)	10–0	ASC La Meyze (12)
260.	Football Cognacois Cyrien Laurentais (10)	0–2	USA Montbronn (10)
261.	AC Gond-Pontouvre (12)	3–2	FC Saint-Cybardeaux (12)
262.	Chabanais FC (12)	1–2	Coqs Rouges Mansle (10)
263.	GS Franco-Portugais Gond-Pontouvre (9)	0–3	ES Mornac (10)
264.	CO La Couronne (9)	1–7	SC Verneuil-sur-Vienne (8)
265.	FC Haute Charente (11)	2–5	ES Périgord Vert (11)
266.	FC Excideuil Saint-Médard (11)	2–7	SC Mouthiers (9)
267.	SC Agris (12)	2–4	UAS Verdille (10)
268.	Targon-Soulignac FC (9)	4–1	AS Neuvic-Saint-Léon (9)
269.	Agen RC (10)	4–1	FC Nérac en Albret (9)
270.	US Port Sainte-Marie Feugarolles (10)	0–2	SC Astaffortais (10)
271.	FC Pineuilh (11)	0–3	ASSA Pays du Dropt (8)
272.	SC Monségur (10)	4–1	AS Castillonnès Cahuzac Lalande (9)
273.	US Bazeillaise (10)	1–4	SJ Bergerac (10)
274.	AS Miramont-Lavergne (9)	1–3	Prigonrieux FC (7)
275.	UFC Saint-Colomb-de-Lauzun (10)	0–2	AF Casseneuil-Pailloles-Lédat (8)
276.	Mas AC (9)	2–1	FC Porte d'Aquitaine 47 (8)
277.	Sud Gironde FC (10)	5–1	FC Pays Beaumontois (10)
278.	US Allemans-du-Dropt (10)	1–1 (3–4 p)	FC Monbazillac-Sigoules (10)
279.	FC Faux (9)	5–0	Entente Grignols Villamblard (10)
280.	US Lamothe-Mongauzy (10)	2–1	FC Pays Aurossais (8)
281.	FLR Le Monteil (11)	5–1	AS Saint-Germain-Chantérac (12)
282.	FC Gironde La Réole (10)	3–1	US Virazeil-Puymiclan (9)
283.	US Gontaud (9)	1–5	SU Agen (7)
284.	FC Côteaux Pécharmant (9)	0–1	Pays de l'Eyraud (10)

=== Second round ===
These matches were played on 3, 4 and 11 September 2022.

Second round results: Nouvelle Aquitaine
Tie no	Home team (tier)	Score	Away team (tier)
1.	ES Celles-Verrines (8)	1–1 (3–2 p)	OL Saint-Liguaire Niort (6)
2.	FC Saint-Médard-en-Jalles (6)	3–0	Andernos Sport FC (7)
3.	Gati-Foot (9)	3–2	AS Mignaloux-Beauvoir (7)
4.	CA Ribéracois (8)	1–1 (3–1 p)	FC Grand Saint-Emilionnais (7)
5.	FC Loudun (10)	1–0	ES Nouaillé (8)
6.	SL Cenon-sur-Vienne (11)	0–4	Espérance Terves (9)
7.	Antran SL (9)	0–4	ES Aubinrorthais (8)
8.	CO Cerizay (8)	3–1	Ozon FC (8)
9.	ES Oyré-Dangé (9)	2–4	SA Moncoutant (7)
10.	US Pays Maixentais (8)	2–1	AS Réthaise (7)
11.	US Vivonne (11)	0–6	FC Périgny (7)
12.	DR Boucholeurs-Châtelaillon-Yves (10)	2–1	AAAM Laleu-La Pallice (8)
13.	AS Périgné (11)	0–3	Aunis AFC (8)
14.	US Mélusine (10)	0–3	FC Fontaine-le-Comte (7)
15.	Entente Saint-Maurice-Gençay (11)	3–3 (2–4 p)	JS Nieuil l'Espoir (8)
16.	ACG Foot Sud 86 (10)	0–2	Coqs Rouges Mansle (10)
17.	Avenir Nord Foot 87 (10)	1–1 (6–5 p)	CA Saint-Savin-Saint-Germain (7)
18.	SC Verrières (9)	0–2	Stade Ruffec (8)
19.	Entente Nanteuil-Verteuil (11)	0–0 (1–4 p)	AS Valdivienne (10)
20.	AS Cabariot (8)	1–4	AS Cozes (7)
21.	US Marennaise (8)	2–0	ALFC Fontcouverte (9)
22.	FC Boutonnais (10)	0–4	SC Saint-Jean-d'Angély (6)
23.	Saint-Palais SF (8)	4–0	ES Champniers (9)
24.	JS Sireuil (7)	2–1	Royan Vaux AFC (6)
25.	ES Thénacaise (11)	0–7	Rochefort FC (6)
26.	US La Gémoze (10)	2–1	US Pont l'Abbé d'Arnoult (11)
27.	JS Basseau Angoulême (9)	0–3	ASFC Vindelle (8)
28.	JS Lafarge Limoges (7)	0–0 (8–7 p)	OFC Ruelle (8)
29.	US Chasseneuil (10)	2–2 (4–1 p)	FC Pays Arédien (10)
30.	FC Confolentais (8)	0–3	AS Nontron-Saint-Pardoux (7)
31.	Limoges Football (8)	1–1 (3–4 p)	ES Beaubreuil (7)
32.	ES Mornac (10)	3–2	USA Montbronn (10)
33.	AS Brie (9)	0–1	AS Soyaux (8)
34.	AS Aixoise (7)	1–2	JA Isle (6)
35.	AS Châteauneuf-Neuvic (8)	0–1	CA Peyrat-la-Nonière (8)
36.	CA Meymac (8)	3–0	US Auzances (9)
37.	USA Compreignac (9)	3–2	CS Boussac (7)
38.	ES Nonards (8)	1–2	SA Sanilhacois (9)
39.	Entente Perpezac Sadroc (9)	0–6	AS Saint-Pantaleon (6)
40.	FC Argentat (8)	0–1	ESA Brive (6)
41.	AS Jugeals-Noailles (8)	1–2	US Donzenac (7)
42.	SC Mouthiers (9)	0–2	Alliance Foot 3B (8)
43.	FC Cœur Médoc Atlantique (7)	5–3	US Bouscataise (7)
44.	SC Cadaujac (8)	0–2	SAG Cestas (6)
45.	FC Marmande 47 (6)	1–1 (4–5 p)	La Brède FC (6)
46.	ES Meillon-Assat-Narcastet (8)	1–1 (8–7 p)	US Portugais Pau (7)
47.	Pardies Olympique (8)	1–1 (2–3 p)	FA Morlaàs Est Béarn (7)
48.	FC Roquefort Saint-Justin (10)	0–1	Élan Béarnaise Orthez (7)
49.	FC La Ribère (8)	1–1 (4–5 p)	ES Montoise (8)
50.	Les Labourdins d'Ustaritz (8)	1–1 (3–4 p)	Labenne OSC (8)
51.	FC Saint-Vincent-de-Paul (8)	0–4	Croisés Saint-André Bayonne (6)
52.	Biscarrosse OFC (8)	2–0	FC Belin-Béliet (8)
53.	SA Mauléonais (7)	0–0 (6–5 p)	Hiriburuko Ainhara (6)
54.	Seignosse-Capbreton-Soustons FC (8)	1–2	Saint-Paul Sport (6)
55.	FC Bassin d'Arcachon (6)	2–1	Arin Luzien (6)
56.	Hasparren FC (8)	0–0 (6–5 p)	FC Tartas Saint-Yaguen (6)
57.	CL Noirlieu-Chambroutet Bressuire (11)	0–4	EF Le Tallud (7)
58.	ES Trois Cités Poitiers (9)	3–1	ES Buxerolles (6)
59.	FC Saint-Jean-Missé (11)	0–2	CA Saint-Aubin-le-Cloud (9)
60.	ES La Pallu (11)	0–2	US Mirebeau (11)
61.	AS Saint-Léger Montbrillais (11)	0–3	US Thuré-Besse (10)
62.	ES Saint-Cerbouillé (8)	1–1 (3–1 p)	Inter Bocage FC (9)
63.	AAS Saint-Julien-l'Ars (10)	3–3 (6–5 p)	AS Poitiers Gibauderie Mahorais (11)
64.	AS Ingrandes-sur-Vienne (10)	3–1	Buslaurs Thireuil (10)
65.	FC Sud Gâtine (10)	1–1 (2–4 p)	FC Nueillaubiers (6)
66.	Amicale Coussay-les-Bois (12)	0–10	FC Bressuire (6)
67.	US Saint-Sauveur (7)	1–1 (4–2 p)	CS Naintré (7)
68.	FC Chiché (11)	2–5	US Vicq-sur-Gartempe (8)
69.	FC Chanteloup-Courlay-Chapelle (10)	0–3	Thouars Foot 79 (6)
70.	US Vergentonnaise (12)	1–8	US Migné-Auxances (7)
71.	ES Saint-Amand-sur-Sèvre (11)	0–1	ES Louzy (10)
72.	FC Vrines (8)	1–2	ES Beaumont-Saint-Cyr (7)
73.	FC Clazay Bocage (11)	0–3	RC Parthenay Viennay (6)
74.	FC Vouneuil-sous-Biard-Béruges (10)	0–1	US Mauzé-sur-le-Mignon (9)
75.	Stade Boisseuillais (11)	0–7	Capaunis ASPTT FC (8)
76.	UA Niort Saint-Florent (7)	0–5	ES La Rochelle (6)
77.	Croutelle FC (12)	1–8	Étoile Maritime FC (7)
78.	ES Château-Larcher (9)	3–0	CS Beauvoir-sur-Niort (10)
79.	FC Autize (9)	1–0	ACS La Rochelle (10)
80.	US Pexinoise Niort (12)	1–3	AS Sainte-Ouenne (13)
81.	AS Pays Mellois (8)	1–0	AS Aiffres (8)
82.	Biard FC (11)	0–6	FC Chauray (6)
83.	AS Saint-Martin-lès-Melle (10)	1–6	CS Venise Verte (11)
84.	US Lezay (11)	1–1 (10–11 p)	La Ligugéenne Football (6)
85.	ES Brûlain (10)	1–2	FC Rouillé (10)
86.	FC Canton de Courçon (11)	1–4	ASS Portugais La Rochelle (11)
87.	US Frontenay-Saint-Symphorien (9)	1–1 (7–8 p)	FC Dompierre-Sainte-Soulle (7)
88.	FC Atlantique (11)	0–2	AS Échiré Saint-Gelais (7)
89.	FC Vallée du Salleron (12)	1–2	FC Fleuré (10)
90.	US Leignes-sur-Fontaine (10)	2–2 (4–3 p)	FC Usson-Isle (8)
91.	CS Saint-Angeau (11)	2–4	ES Marchoise (7)
92.	ES Élan Charentais (11)	2–2 (3–4 p)	FC Fursac (10)
93.	AS Lussac-les-Églises (11)	1–6	UES Montmorillon (6)
94.	Avenir Matha (8)	0–0 (5–6 p)	Ile d’Oléron Football (9)
95.	ES Linars (10)	0–4	ES Saintes (7)
96.	Val de Boutonne Foot 79 (10)	3–0	ES Montignac 16 (10)
97.	AC Gond-Pontouvre (12)	1–3	UAS Verdille (10)
98.	AL Saint-Brice (10)	0–7	UA Cognac (6)
99.	AS Aigre (10)	2–2 (8–9 p)	AS Bel-Air (10)
100.	ES Clussais (11)	1–2	AS Merpins (7)
101.	AS Néré (12)	3–3 (1–4 p)	US Saujon (10)
102.	FC Essouvert Loulay (10)	1–2	CS Leroy Angoulême (7)
103.	UC Antenne (11)	2–5	Jarnac SF (7)
104.	SC Séreilhac (11)	1–1 (5–6 p)	La Roche/Rivières FC Tardoire (8)
105.	ES Limoges (9)	0–2	SC Verneuil-sur-Vienne (8)
106.	CA Brantômois (9)	0–7	AS Saint-Junien (8)
107.	FC Charente Limousine (7)	1–1 (4–2 p)	USE Couzeix-Chaptelat (7)
108.	FC des 2 Vallées (9)	1–3	AS Puymoyen (8)
109.	Limoges Landouge (8)	2–0	La Thibérienne (9)
110.	USS Mérinchal (9)	0–1	CA Rilhac-Rancon (8)
111.	AC Kurdes Limoges (10)	2–3	ES Ussel (9)
112.	US Beaune-les-Mines (10)	0–8	AS Panazol (6)
113.	ES La Croisille-Linards (11)	1–6	EF Aubussonnais (8)
114.	AS Saint-Sulpice-le-Guérétois (8)	0–3	AS Gouzon (7)
115.	AS Turcs Ussel (10)	0–1	AS Eymoutiers (10)
116.	CA Chamboulive (9)	2–0	AS Ambazac (9)
117.	Occitane FC (9)	3–0	JS Chambon-sur-Voueize (10)
118.	RFC Sainte-Feyre (9)	2–2 (2–4 p)	Tulle Football Corrèze (7)
119.	AS Nexon (9)	0–5	AF Portugais Limoges (7)
120.	AS Maussacoise (10)	0–3	CS Feytiat (6)
121.	FC Bassimilhacois (9)	1–1 (3–4 p)	FC Sarlat-Marcillac (7)
122.	Athlético Vernois (9)	1–2	Périgueux Foot (9)
123.	FC Limeuil (9)	4–1	FC Thenon-Limeyrat-Fossemagne (8)
124.	ES Périgord Vert (11)	1–1 (5–4 p)	US Marsaneix Manoire (11)
125.	ES Montignacoise (10)	1–4	ES Boulazac (6)
126.	APCS Mahorais Brive (10)	0–3	Entente SR3V (9)
127.	US Lanteuil (9)	2–3	ASV Malemort (9)
128.	Rouffignac OC (11)	2–6	SS Sainte-Féréole (8)
129.	FC Atur (10)	1–2	FC Périgord Centre (8)
130.	CM Floirac (11)	3–2	US Artiguaise (10)
131.	CMO Bassens (8)	1–2	CO Coulouniex-Chamiers (8)
132.	Montpon-Ménesplet FC (8)	0–0 (5–3 p)	Athletic 89 FC (9)
133.	JS Castellevequoise (10)	1–5	Limens JSA (7)
134.	Bouliacaise FC (10)	2–1	FC Côteaux Libournais (8)
135.	FC Ambès (11)	1–0	FC Sud 17 (9)
136.	US Nord Gironde (10)	1–1 (2–4 p)	FC Loubesien (8)
137.	ES Ambares (9)	0–6	US Lormont(6)
138.	Les Aiglons Razacois (10)	1–6	US Cenon Rive Droite (7)
139.	US Chancelade/Marsac (8)	2–3	FC Mascaret (7)
140.	Étoile La Roche-Chalais (10)	0–3 (Note: Tie won by means of forfeit.)	FC Saint André-de-Cubzac (7)
141.	US Coutras (10)	1–0	FC Estuaire Haute Gironde (7)
142.	AS Pugnac (10)	0–2	FC Sévigné Jonzac-Saint-Germain (8)
143.	Stade Blayais (10)	1–0	US Mussidan-Saint Medard (6)
144.	Stade Pessacais UC (10)	5–1	Union Saint-Jean (10)
145.	AS Le Taillan (8)	0–2	Jeunesse Villenave (6)
146.	CS Lantonnais (8)	1–3	FC Pessac Alouette (7)
147.	ES Eysinaise (9)	0–4	FC Arsac-Pian Médoc (8)
148.	RC Chambéry (9)	0–1	SA Mérignac (6)
149.	Coqs Rouges Bordeaux (8)	1–5	CA Béglais (7)
150.	Bordeaux Étudiants CF (9)	3–0	FC Médoc Océan (9)
151.	AG Vendays-Montalivet (10)	2–1	US Saint-Germain-d'Esteuil (11)
152.	ES Blanquefort (7)	3–2	Union Saint-Bruno (7)
153.	Montesquieu FC (8)	0–2	Stade Saint-Médardais (6)
154.	ES Bruges (10)	0–2	Landes Girondines FC (10)
155.	FCE Mérignac Arlac (6)	7–0	CA Sainte-Hélène (7)
156.	USC Léognan (10)	1–2	FC Talence (7)
157.	SC Astaffortais (10)	0–0 (4–5 p)	Langon FC (7)
158.	US Vallée de Garonne (10)	1–2	FLR Le Monteil (11)
159.	Pays de l'Eyraud (10)	0–1	SC Monségur (10)
160.	CA Castets-en-Dorthe (10)	0–2	Entente Boé Bon-Encontre (7)
161.	AS Pays de Montaigne et Gurçon (9)	1–1 (5–4 p)	AS Côteaux Dordogne (10)
162.	FC Faux (9)	2–2 (4–3 p)	US La Catte (7)
163.	US Lamothe-Mongauzy (10)	2–1	AS Gensac-Montcaret (8)
164.	AS Pellegrue (10)	0–5	SU Agen (7)
165.	US Farguais (10)	2–4	ASSA Pays du Dropt (8)
166.	FC Vallée du Lot (8)	1–1 (2–4 p)	Prigonrieux FC (7)
167.	AF Casseneuil-Pailloles-Lédat (8)	2–2 (5–4 p)	Confluent Football 47 (7)
168.	Mas AC (9)	1–4	FC des Graves (6)
169.	Agen RC (10)	2–5	Patronage Bazadais (8)
170.	FC Monbazillac-Sigoules (10)	1–4	Targon-Soulignac FC (9)
171.	SJ Bergerac (10)	3–1	FC Gironde La Réole (10)
172.	SA Saint-Séverin (9)	2–0	FC des Enclaves et du Plateau (10)
173.	AS Artix (8)	1–8	FC Lescar (6)
174.	SC Saint-Symphorien (10)	2–0	SC Arthez Lacq Audejos (8)
175.	ES Nay-Vath-Vielha (9)	0–3	Stade Ygossais (7)
176.	US Marsan (9)	1–5	SC Saint-Pierre-du-Mont (7)
177.	FC Artiguelouve-Arbus-Aubertin (10)	1–0	Sud Gironde FC (10)
178.	Union Jurançonnaise (8)	4–3	Avenir Mourenxois (9)
179.	AS Bretagne-de-Marsan (9)	1–1 (3–4 p)	AL Poey-de-Lescar (8)
180.	US Garein (10)	2–7	US Castétis-Gouze (9)
181.	FC Lons (8)	0–1	FC Oloronais (9)
182.	AS Mazères-Uzos-Rontignon (8)	4–2	FC Doazit (7)
183.	Elan Boucalais (8)	1–0	US Saint-Palais Amikuze (9)
184.	Cazaux Olympique (9)	1–2	AS Facture-Biganos Boïens (7)
185.	Kanboko Izarra (11)	1–3	CA Sallois (8)
186.	FC Mées (11)	1–3	JA Dax (7)
187.	AS Tarnos (8)	0–2	JA Biarritz (7)
188.	AS Colombiers (12)	4–1	ES Lavoux-Liniers (11)
189.	US Nantiat (10)	1–2	US La Roche l'Abeille (10)

=== Third round ===
These matches were played on 10, 11 and 18 September 2022.

Third round results: Nouvelle Aquitaine
Tie no	Home team (tier)	Score	Away team (tier)
1.	Gati-Foot (9)	0–1	US Saint-Sauveur (7)
2.	FC Loudun (10)	0–13	Thouars Foot 79 (6)
3.	JS Nieuil l'Espoir (8)	2–3	RC Parthenay Viennay (6)
4.	FC Bressuire (6)	1–2	Stade Poitevin FC (5)
5.	US Migné-Auxances (7)	0–8	US Chauvigny (5)
6.	Ile d’Oléron Football (9)	1–1 (3–0 p)	AS Pays Mellois (8)
7.	FC Rouillé (10)	2–1	FC Autize (9)
8.	Aunis AFC (8)	0–4	SC Saint-Jean-d'Angély (6)
9.	DR Boucholeurs-Châtelaillon-Yves (10)	2–3	US Marennaise (8)
10.	UAS Verdille (10)	1–2	AS Échiré Saint-Gelais (7)
11.	Stade Ruffec (8)	1–2	Étoile Maritime FC (7)
12.	Rochefort FC (6)	0–3	FC Périgny (7)
13.	CA Meymac (8)	4–0	CA Chamboulive (9)
14.	US Thuré-Besse (10)	1–2	La Ligugéenne Football (6)
15.	ES Trois Cités Poitiers (9)	3–0	AAS Saint-Julien-l'Ars (10)
16.	CA Saint-Aubin-le-Cloud (9)	2–2 (1–3 p)	CO Cerizay (8)
17.	US Leignes-sur-Fontaine (10)	0–2	SA Moncoutant (7)
18.	US Vicq-sur-Gartempe (8)	0–0 (1–4 p)	FC Nueillaubiers (6)
19.	ES Louzy (10)	1–3	AS Ingrandes-sur-Vienne (10)
20.	ES Saint-Cerbouillé (8)	0–10	CA Neuville (5)
21.	ES Beaumont-Saint-Cyr (7)	1–3	SO Châtellerault (5)
22.	ES Aubinrorthais (8)	1–1 (5–4 p)	EF Le Tallud (7)
23.	US Mirebeau (11)	1–1 (3–1 p)	AS Colombiers (12)
24.	Espérance Terves (9)	2–1	UES Montmorillon (6)
25.	FC Fleuré (10)	0–1	AS Valdivienne (10)
26.	ASS Portugais La Rochelle (11)	0–6	Capaunis ASPTT FC (8)
27.	Val de Boutonne Foot 79 (10)	0–4	FC Chauray (6)
28.	US Mauzé-sur-le-Mignon (9)	2–2 (3–2 p)	FC Fontaine-le-Comte (7)
29.	AS Sainte-Ouenne (13)	0–3	ES Château-Larcher (9)
30.	Coqs Rouges Mansle (10)	1–3	ES La Rochelle (6)
31.	FC Dompierre-Sainte-Soulle (7)	6–1	ES Celles-Verrines (8)
32.	CS Venise Verte (11)	3–1	US Pays Maixentais (8)
33.	US La Roche l'Abeille (10)	1–5	JA Isle (6)
34.	ES Beaubreuil (7)	1–2	JS Lafarge Limoges (7)
35.	SC Verneuil-sur-Vienne (8)	1–1 (0–3 p)	CA Peyrat-la-Nonière (8)
36.	FC Fursac (10)	0–2	Limoges Landouge (8)
37.	AS Eymoutiers (10)	0–3	ES Guérétoise (5)
38.	Avenir Nord Foot 87 (10)	1–1 (4–5 p)	Occitane FC (9)
39.	USA Compreignac (9)	1–9	CS Feytiat (6)
40.	CA Rilhac-Rancon (8)	0–5	AS Panazol (6)
41.	ES Ussel (9)	3–6	Tulle Football Corrèze (7)
42.	AS Gouzon (7)	2–4	AF Portugais Limoges (7)
43.	ES Marchoise (7)	2–5	EF Aubussonnais (8)
44.	US Chasseneuil (10)	1–3	FC Périgord Centre (8)
45.	US Donzenac (7)	0–1	ESA Brive (6)
46.	SS Sainte-Féréole (8)	0–0 (4–5 p)	FC Charente Limousine (7)
47.	CO Coulouniex-Chamiers (8)	0–2	AS Saint-Pantaleon (6)
48.	La Roche/Rivières FC Tardoire (8)	0–5	ES Boulazac (6)
49.	AS Saint-Junien (8)	1–2	AS Nontron-Saint-Pardoux (7)
50.	ASV Malemort (9)	4–2	Périgueux Foot (9)
51.	ES Périgord Vert (11)	0–4	FC Limeuil (9)
52.	Entente SR3V (9)	1–1 (2–4 p)	ES Mornac (10)
53.	SA Sanilhacois (9)	0–3	FC Sarlat-Marcillac (7)
54.	Stade Blayais (10)	5–2	ASFC Vindelle (8)
55.	Jarnac SF (7)	1–1 (3–4 p)	FC des Portes de l'Entre-Deux-Mers (5)
56.	FC Loubesien (8)	1–2	US Lormont (6)
57.	US Coutras (10)	0–0 (2–4 p)	AS Merpins (7)
58.	FC Mascaret (7)	3–0	Saint-Palais SF (8)
59.	CM Floirac (11)	0–4	JS Sireuil (7)
60.	AS Puymoyen (8)	1–2	AS Cozes (7)
61.	FLR Le Monteil (11)	1–6	CA Béglais (7)
62.	Bouliacaise FC (10)	0–2	FC Libourne (5)
63.	FC Sévigné Jonzac-Saint-Germain (8)	2–1	Limens JSA (7)
64.	FC Saint André-de-Cubzac (7)	6–0	CA Ribéracois (8)
65.	US Saujon (10)	2–4	FC Ambès (11)
66.	AS Bel-Air (10)	0–4	UA Cognac (6)
67.	CS Leroy Angoulême (7)	0–0 (2–4 p)	Alliance Foot 3B (8)
68.	US La Gémoze (10)	0–8	FCE Mérignac Arlac (6)
69.	ES Saintes (7)	5–2	AS Soyaux (8)
70.	US Cenon Rive Droite (7)	0–0 (4–1 p)	FC Arsac-Pian Médoc (8)
71.	ASSA Pays du Dropt (8)	0–3	Jeunesse Villenave (6)
72.	SU Agen (7)	2–2 (4–2 p)	Prigonrieux FC (7)
73.	AS Pays de Montaigne et Gurçon (9)	2–2 (2–4 p)	US Lamothe-Mongauzy (10)
74.	AG Vendays-Montalivet (10)	1–2	Stade Saint-Médardais (6)
75.	FC Faux (9)	2–1	SAG Cestas (6)
76.	AF Casseneuil-Pailloles-Lédat (8)	2–1	La Brède FC (6)
77.	SC Monségur (10)	0–5	FC Cœur Médoc Atlantique (7)
78.	Bordeaux Étudiants CF (9)	3–1	SJ Bergerac (10)
79.	Stade Pessacais UC (10)	3–5	US Lège Cap Ferret (5)
80.	Langon FC (7)	4–2	FC des Graves (6)
81.	FC Talence (7)	5–2	FC Pessac Alouette (7)
82.	ES Blanquefort (7)	1–0	Montpon-Ménesplet FC (8)
83.	Targon-Soulignac FC (9)	0–4	SA Mérignac (6)
84.	SC Saint-Symphorien (10)	1–0	Labenne OSC (8)
85.	CA Sallois (8)	1–6	FC Bassin d'Arcachon (6)
86.	Entente Boé Bon-Encontre (7)	1–0	FC Saint-Médard-en-Jalles (6)
87.	Landes Girondines FC (10)	0–4	ES Montoise (8)
88.	Élan Béarnaise Orthez (7)	0–10	Genêts Anglet (5)
89.	Stade Ygossais (7)	2–3	Stade Montois (5)
90.	FA Morlaàs Est Béarn (7)	1–1 (5–4 p)	Elan Boucalais (8)
91.	Hasparren FC (8)	8–1	SA Saint-Séverin (9)
92.	FC Oloronais (9)	2–1	Biscarrosse OFC (8)
93.	AS Facture-Biganos Boïens (7)	4–1	JA Biarritz (7)
94.	Croisés Saint-André Bayonne (6)	2–0	JA Dax (7)
95.	Patronage Bazadais (8)	4–2	Union Jurançonnaise (8)
96.	FC Lescar (6)	2–1	SA Mauléonais (7)
97.	US Castétis-Gouze (9)	1–0	ES Meillon-Assat-Narcastet (8)
98.	SC Saint-Pierre-du-Mont (7)	0–0 (2–3 p)	AS Mazères-Uzos-Rontignon (8)
99.	FC Artiguelouve-Arbus-Aubertin (10)	0–4	Saint-Paul Sport (6)
100.	AL Poey-de-Lescar (8)	0–5	Aviron Bayonnais FC (5)

=== Fourth round ===
These matches were played on 24 and 25 September 2022.

Fourth round results: Nouvelle Aquitaine
Tie no	Home team (tier)	Score	Away team (tier)
1.	ES Château-Larcher (9)	2–1	La Ligugéenne Football (6)
2.	CO Cerizay (8)	0–2	CA Neuville (5)
3.	EF Aubussonnais (8)	2–0	AF Portugais Limoges (7)
4.	Thouars Foot 79 (6)	1–2	Étoile Maritime FC (7)
5.	FC Périgny (7)	4–0	FC Dompierre-Sainte-Soulle (7)
6.	FC Limeuil (9)	0–5	FC des Portes de l'Entre-Deux-Mers (5)
7.	US Lormont (6)	4–1	FC Saint André-de-Cubzac (7)
8.	US Marennaise (8)	0–10	Bergerac Périgord FC (4)
9.	Alliance Foot 3B (8)	1–3	FCE Mérignac Arlac (6)
10.	US Lège Cap Ferret (5)	2–0	UA Cognac (6)
11.	AS Valdivienne (10)	0–8	US Chauvigny (5)
12.	FC Oloronais (9)	4–0	AS Facture-Biganos Boïens (7)
13.	Genêts Anglet (5)	0–0 (8–7 p)	Stade Montois (5)
14.	Patronage Bazadais (8)	0–2	FC Bassin d'Arcachon (6)
15.	FC Rouillé (10)	0–2	US Saint-Sauveur (7)
16.	AS Ingrandes-sur-Vienne (10)	1–1 (3–4 p)	ES Trois Cités Poitiers (9)
17.	CS Feytiat (6)	1–3	Trélissac-Antonne Périgord FC (4)
18.	CA Peyrat-la-Nonière (8)	0–6	Stade Poitevin FC (5)
19.	Tulle Football Corrèze (7)	1–0	CA Meymac (8)
20.	FC Périgord Centre (8)	1–2	AS Nontron-Saint-Pardoux (7)
21.	ES Mornac (10)	4–4 (1–3 p)	FC Sarlat-Marcillac (7)
22.	ES Boulazac (6)	4–1	ESA Brive (6)
23.	ES Guérétoise (5)	0–0 (5–4 p)	AS Panazol (6)
24.	FC Sévigné Jonzac-Saint-Germain (8)	1–1 (4–2 p)	ES Saintes (7)
25.	SC Saint-Jean-d'Angély (6)	1–0	JS Sireuil (7)
26.	Jeunesse Villenave (6)	0–0 (1–4 p)	FC Lescar (6)
27.	ES Montoise (8)	1–2	Entente Boé Bon-Encontre (7)
28.	FC Cœur Médoc Atlantique (7)	0–2	Stade Bordelais (4)
29.	Saint-Paul Sport (6)	3–1	FC Talence (7)
30.	ES Aubinrorthais (8)	1–0	FC Nueillaubiers (6)
31.	US Mauzé-sur-le-Mignon (9)	0–1	FC Chauray (6)
32.	US Mirebeau (11)	1–2	RC Parthenay Viennay (6)
33.	CS Venise Verte (11)	0–6	ES La Rochelle (6)
34.	Espérance Terves (9)	0–4	SO Châtellerault (5)
35.	AS Échiré Saint-Gelais (7)	0–0 (5–4 p)	SA Moncoutant (7)
36.	Capaunis ASPTT FC (8)	1–3	Angoulême Charente FC (4)
37.	ASV Malemort (9)	1–5	AS Saint-Pantaleon (6)
38.	FC Charente Limousine (7)	2–0	Limoges Landouge (8)
39.	SA Mérignac (6)	3–2	JA Isle (6)
40.	Occitane FC (9)	2–1	JS Lafarge Limoges (7)
41.	AF Casseneuil-Pailloles-Lédat (8)	1–3	FC Libourne (5)
42.	Bordeaux Étudiants CF (9)	1–2	CA Béglais (7)
43.	FC Faux (9)	0–5	AS Merpins (7)
44.	AS Cozes (7)	2–1	ES Blanquefort (7)
45.	FC Ambès (11)	1–0	Ile d’Oléron Football (9)
46.	Stade Blayais (10)	2–3	FC Mascaret (7)
47.	SC Saint-Symphorien (10)	0–3	Hasparren FC (8)
48.	Langon FC (7)	0–1	US Cenon Rive Droite (7)
49.	AS Mazères-Uzos-Rontignon (8)	4–1	SU Agen (7)
50.	US Castétis-Gouze (9)	0–4	Aviron Bayonnais FC (5)
51.	US Lamothe-Mongauzy (10)	0–7	Croisés Saint-André Bayonne (6)
52.	Stade Saint-Médardais (6)	1–1 (3–2 p)	FA Morlaàs Est Béarn (7)

=== Fifth round ===
These matches were played on 8 and 9 October 2022.

Fifth round results: Nouvelle Aquitaine
Tie no	Home team (tier)	Score	Away team (tier)
1.	ES Guérétoise (5)	1–1 (4–3 p)	SC Saint-Jean-d'Angély (6)
2.	Tulle Football Corrèze (7)	1–3	Angoulême Charente FC (4)
3.	FC Sarlat-Marcillac (7)	1–2	CA Neuville (5)
4.	FC Périgny (7)	1–3	SO Châtellerault (5)
5.	Hasparren FC (8)	1–4	FC Lescar (6)
6.	FC Oloronais (9)	0–5	US Lège Cap Ferret (5)
7.	Aviron Bayonnais FC (5)	1–0	ES Boulazac (6)
8.	Entente Boé Bon-Encontre (7)	2–1	FC Bassin d'Arcachon (6)
9.	Bergerac Périgord FC (4)	2–1	Genêts Anglet (5)
10.	Occitane FC (9)	2–0	ES La Rochelle (6)
11.	AS Saint-Pantaleon (6)	0–2	Stade Poitevin FC (5)
12.	EF Aubussonnais (8)	1–1 (5–3 p)	ES Château-Larcher (9)
13.	Stade Saint-Médardais (6)	0–3	Stade Bordelais (4)
14.	SA Mérignac (6)	2–2 (7–6 p)	US Lormont (6)
15.	AS Nontron-Saint-Pardoux (7)	0–0 (3–4 p)	FC Libourne (5)
16.	AS Mazères-Uzos-Rontignon (8)	1–2	FC des Portes de l'Entre-Deux-Mers (5)
17.	FC Mascaret (7)	0–3	FCE Mérignac Arlac (6)
18.	FC Ambès (11)	1–2	FC Sévigné Jonzac-Saint-Germain (8)
19.	Croisés Saint-André Bayonne (6)	0–1	Saint-Paul Sport (6)
20.	US Cenon Rive Droite (7)	1–2	CA Béglais (7)
21.	ES Trois Cités Poitiers (9)	0–4	FC Chauray (6)
22.	FC Charente Limousine (7)	1–0	AS Échiré Saint-Gelais (7)
23.	AS Merpins (7)	2–0	AS Cozes (7)
24.	US Saint-Sauveur (7)	1–3	US Chauvigny (5)
25.	ES Aubinrorthais (8)	1–1 (4–5 p)	RC Parthenay Viennay (6)
26.	Étoile Maritime FC (7)	1–4	Trélissac-Antonne Périgord FC (4)

=== Sixth round ===
These matches were played on 15 and 16 October 2022.

Sixth round results: Nouvelle Aquitaine
Tie no	Home team (tier)	Score	Away team (tier)
1.	Angoulême Charente FC (4)	3–2	FC des Portes de l'Entre-Deux-Mers (5)
2.	CA Neuville (5)	2–2 (3–5 p)	Trélissac-Antonne Périgord FC (4)
3.	FC Lescar (6)	0–0 (4–2 p)	Saint-Paul Sport (6)
4.	CA Béglais (7)	1–3	SA Mérignac (6)
5.	FCE Mérignac Arlac (6)	3–0	ES Guérétoise (5)
6.	EF Aubussonnais (8)	0–2	Entente Boé Bon-Encontre (7)
7.	Occitane FC (9)	0–3	AS Merpins (7)
8.	FC Sévigné Jonzac-Saint-Germain (8)	2–3	SO Châtellerault (5)
9.	Aviron Bayonnais FC (5)	0–2	Bergerac Périgord FC (4)
10.	FC Libourne (5)	1–1 (3–4 p)	Stade Poitevin FC (5)
11.	RC Parthenay Viennay (6)	0–1	Stade Bordelais (4)
12.	US Lège Cap Ferret (5)	1–1 (4–3 p)	US Chauvigny (5)
13.	FC Chauray (6)	3–0	FC Charente Limousine (7)
