= Wattel =

Wattel is a French surname. Notable people with the surname include:

- Marie Wattel (born 1997), French swimmer
- Romain Wattel (born 1991), French golfer
- Sami Wattel (born 2006), Central African footballer
