= Hervé Lougoundji =

Central African Republic football manager

Personal information
- Date of birth: 27 April 1975 (age 51)
- Place of birth: Central African Republic

Managerial career
- Years: Team
- 2012–2014: Central African Republic
- 2015–2017: Central African Republic

Hervé Lougoundji (born 27 April 1975) is a football manager from Central African Republic who currently not contracted by a club or national team. From May 2012 to August 2014 he coached the Central African Republic national football team.
