= Central African Republic national football team =

Men's association football team

Central African Republic
- Nickname(s): Les Fauves (The Wild Beasts)
- Association: Fédération Centrafricaine de Football (FCF)
- Confederation: CAF (Africa)
- Sub-confederation: UNIFFAC (Central Africa)
- Head coach: Abdelaziz Karkache
- Captain: Geoffrey Kondogbia
- Most caps: Foxi Kéthévoama (49)
- Top scorer: Louis Mafouta (17)
- Home stadium: Barthélemy Boganda Stadium
- FIFA code: CTA
First colours	Second colours

FIFA ranking
- Current: 145 ▼6 (7 October 2026)
- Highest: 49 (October 2012)
- Lowest: 202 (July–September 2009, March–August 2010)

First international
- Ubangi-Shari 5–1 French Cameroon (Ubangi-Shari; unknown date 1956)

Biggest win
- Central African Republic 6–0 Bhutan (Colombo, Sri Lanka; 22 March 2024)

Biggest defeat
- Ivory Coast 11–0 Central African Republic (Abidjan, Ivory Coast; 27 December 1961)

African Nations Championship
- Appearances: 1 (first in 2024)
- Best result: Group stage (2024)

The Central African Republic national football team (French: Équipe de République centrafricaine de football), nicknamed Les Fauves, is the national team of the Central African Republic and is controlled by the Central African Football Federation. They are a member of CAF. Despite being traditionally one of the weakest teams in Africa and the world, they have had some success. They won the 2009 CEMAC Cup by beating Gabon in the semi-finals and Equatorial Guinea in the final 3–0. Their FIFA ranking rose from 202nd in August 2010 to 89th by July 2011. On 10 October 2010, they earned a shock 2012 Africa Cup of Nations qualifier win at home against Algeria 2–0, which put them top of their qualification group. The team won its first FIFA World Cup qualifier on 2 June 2012 after beating Botswana 2–0 at home.

== History ==
=== Early years (1956–1989) ===
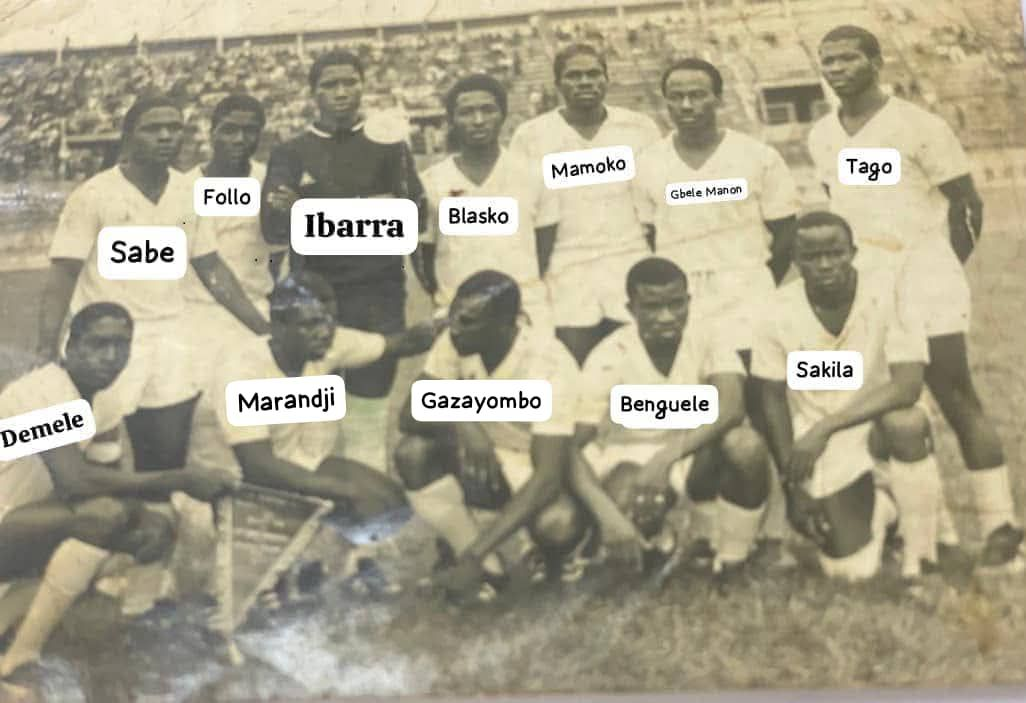
Central African Republic Team in 1972

The team made its debut under the name of Ubangi-Shari in 1956 against French Cameroon. The Central African Football Federation was founded in 1961 and joined FIFA in 1964 and CAF in 1965.

Their first competitive match was in the 1961 Friendship Games in Ivory Coast where Central African Republic drew twice against Upper Volta and Liberia before losing to the hosts and failing to progress to the next round.

Central African Republic entered the 1974 African Cup of Nations qualification for the first time, progressing due to Gabon's withdrawal but were then eliminated 5–4 on aggregate by Ivory Coast, a tie which saw the second leg abandoned at half-time after arguments between players of both sides, forcing a replay in Lagos which Ivory Coast won 5–1.

They took part in 1984 UDEAC Cup where they qualified to the knock-out rounds on goal-difference over Equatorial Guinea but were then heavily beaten by Cameroon 7–1 before beating Gabon on penalties to finish third. However, in the 1988 UDEAC Cup, Gabon would get their revenge, beating Central African Republic in the semi-finals. The following year Central African Republic would host the 1989 UDEAC Cup, making it to the finals, beating Gabon on the way, before losing 2–1 to Cameroon.

=== Sporadic matches (1990–2008) ===
During the 1990s, Central African Republic played very few international games, withdrawing from the 1996 African Cup of Nations qualification without playing a match. They returned to competition in the UNIFAC Cup in 1999, winning three times and losing twice to finish second.

Central African Republic participated in the 2002 World Cup qualifiers for the first time, losing in the first round to Zimbabwe. They reached the final of the inaugural CEMAC Cup, losing to an amateur Cameroon team that they'd drawn with a week earlier in the tournament.

=== Promising victories (2009–2019) ===
In 2009, Central African Republic hosted the 2009 CEMAC Cup where they defeated Equatorial Guinea 3–0 in the final, with goals from Salif Kéïta and a brace from Hilaire Momi to claim their first trophy.

During the 2012 Africa Cup of Nations qualifiers, Central African Republic achieved a historic 2–0 home victory over the top seeded Algeria, a team that had recently competed at the 2010 FIFA World Cup. In July 2011, they climbed to 89th place in the FIFA world rankings, having occupied 202nd place as recently as August 2010.

On 2 June 2012, they obtained their first victory in World Cup qualification, beating Botswana 2–0 at home. Despite that positive result, Central African Republic finished bottom of their group. On 15 June 2012, despite being reduced to ten men, they achieved another impressive victory, beating Egypt 3–2 in the 2013 Africa Cup of Nations qualifiers, inflicting the first home defeat on the Egyptians in AFCON qualifiers since 1965. Thanks to a 1–1 draw at home in the second leg, Central African Republic eliminated the Egyptians, but in the second round they were defeated by Burkina Faso.

=== Missed opportunities (2020–present) ===
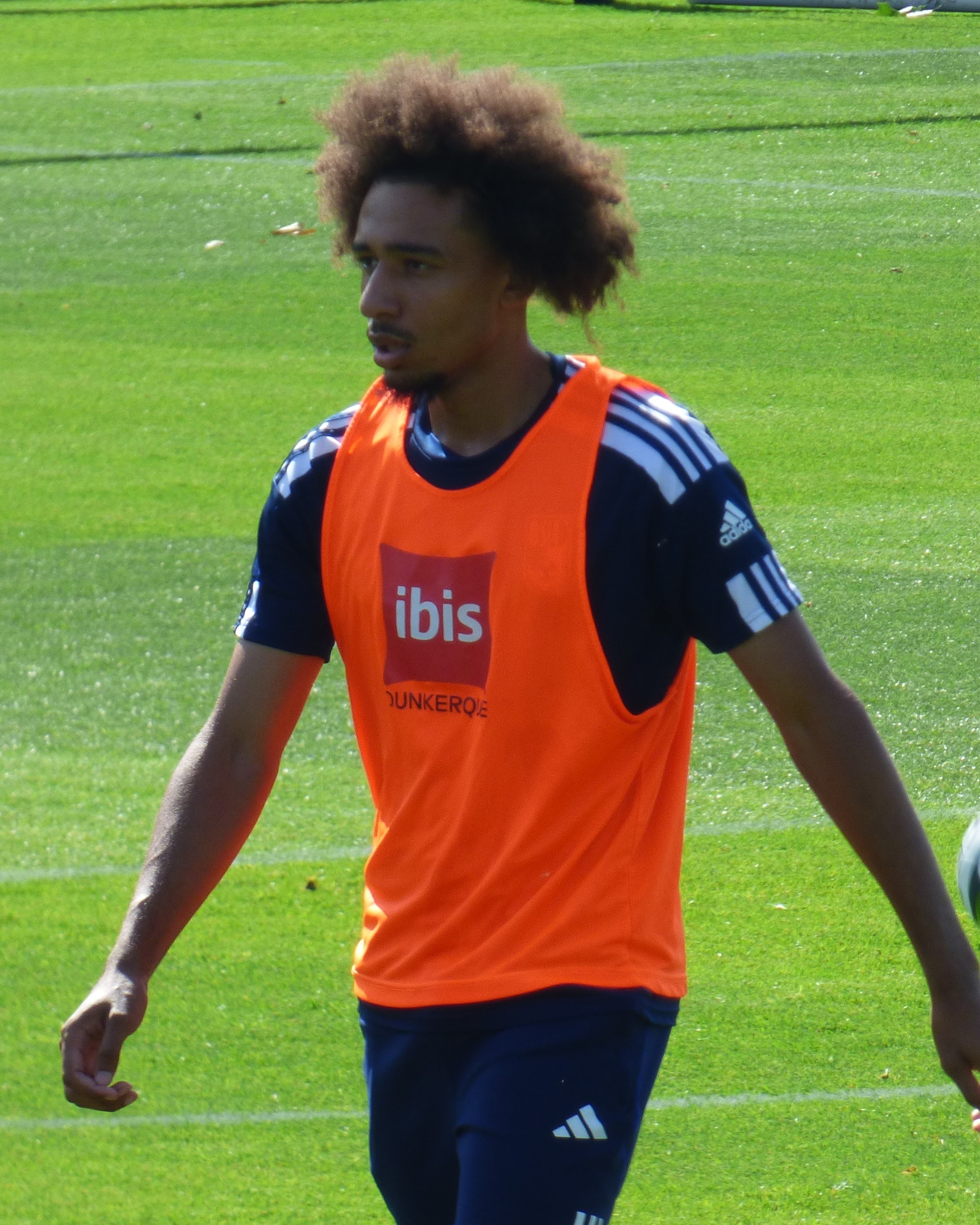
Hugo Gambor played his first game for the Central African Republic in 2024

On 30 March 2021, in the last group stage match of the Africa Cup of Nations qualification, Central African Republic lost 1–0 at home against Mauritania to finish bottom of their group; hence, they missed the opportunity, had they won, to finish second which would have qualified them for the final tournament for the first time in their history.

On 17 June 2023, Central African Republic needed a win at home against Angola on matchday 5 of the qualifications to secure their first ever participation in the Africa Cup of Nations; however, the match ended in a 2–1 defeat and a drop to third place. In the final group stage match, the national team lost 2–1 to Ghana, despite a 1–0 lead, which ended their last hope of qualification.

==== FIFA Series tournament ====
In 2024, Central African Republic played their first ever tournament outside Africa where FIFA invited them to the 2024 FIFA Series matches on from 22 to 25 March 2024 held in Colombo in Sri Lanka where they would face Bhutan and Papua New Guinea.

== Results and fixtures ==
The following is a list of match results in the last 12 months, as well as any future matches that have been scheduled.

Win Draw Loss Fixture

=== 2026 ===
5 June Friendly	Central African Republic	1–1	Togo	Rabat, Morocco
12:00 UTC+1	Koyalipou 26'	Report	Denkey 60'	Stadium: Moulay El Hassan Stadium; Referee: Mohamed El Baroudi (Morocco)

9 June Friendly	Angola	3–0	Central African Republic	Casablanca, Morocco
14:00	Depú 7'; Mabululu 26'; Ary Papel 79'	Report		Stadium: Larbi Zaouli Stadium

24 September 2027 AFCON qualification	Mauritania	3–1	Central African Republic	Casablanca, Morocco
16:00 UTC+0	Koïta 32' (pen.); Camara 69'; Diallo 89'	Report	Koyalipou 48'	Stadium: Larbi Zaouli Stadium; Referee: Boubou Traoré (Mali)

28 September 2027 AFCON qualification	Central African Republic	0–1	Burkina Faso	Casablanca, Morocco
16:00 UTC+0		Report	Camara 60'	Stadium: Larbi Zaouli Stadium; Referee: Aldair Grabe (Guinea-Bissau)

11 November 2027 AFCON qualification	Benin	4–1	Central African Republic	Abidjan, Ivory Coast
TBD	Imourane 7'; Aloko 31'; Tosin 36', 56'	Report	Mafouta 19'	Stadium: Félix Houphouët-Boigny Stadium; Referee: Edson António Esoko (Angola)

15 November 2027 AFCON qualification	Central African Republic	0–1	Benin	Douala, Cameroon
TBD		Report	Oloko 90+3'	Stadium: Japoma Stadium; Referee: Keabetswe Dintwa (Botswana)

=== 2027 ===
24 March 2027 AFCON qualification	Central African Republic	v	Mauritania	TBD, Central African Republic
TBD				Stadium: TBD

28 March 2027 AFCON qualification	Burkina Faso	v	Central African Republic	TBD, Burkina Faso
TBD				Stadium: TBD

== Coaching history ==
Caretaker managers are listed in italics.

- (Soviet Union) Evgeni Rogov (1973–1976)
- (Central African Republic) Étienne Momokoamas (2004–2006)
- (Central African Republic) Francois Yanguere (2006–2008)
- (France) Jules Accorsi (2010–2012)
- (Central African Republic) Herve Lougoundji (2012–2014)
- (Switzerland) Raoul Savoy (2014–2015)
- (France) Blaise Kopogo (2015)
- (Central African Republic) Herve Lougoundji (2015–2017)
- (Switzerland) Raoul Savoy (2017–2019)
- (Ivory Coast) François Zahoui (2019–2021)
- (Switzerland) Raoul Savoy (2021–2024)
- (Central African Republic) Eloge Enza Yamissi (2024–2025)
- (Cameroon) Rigobert Song (2025)
- (Central African Republic) Eloge Enza Yamissi (2025–2026)
- (Morocco) Abdelaziz Karkache (2026–)

== Players ==
=== Current squad ===
The following players were selected for the 2027 Africa Cup of Nations qualification matches in November 2026.

Caps and goals as of 16 November 2026, after the second match against Benin.

No.	Pos.	Player	Date of birth (age)	Caps	Goals	Club
	GK	Dominique Youfeigane	7 February 2000 (age 26)	22	0	(Royal Belgian Football Association) Roeselare
	GK	Alladum Kolimba	11 August 1987 (age 39)	3	0	(Nigeria Football Federation) Remo Stars
	GK	Emmanuel Takoligba	24 October 2001 (age 25)	0	0	(Central African Football Federation) AS Tempête
	DF	Flory Yangao	13 January 2002 (age 24)	36	0	(Central African Football Federation) Olympic Bangui
	DF	Peter Guinari	2 June 2001 (age 25)	23	1	(Slovak Football Association) Skalica
	DF	Hugo Gambor	30 December 2002 (age 23)	11	1	(French Football Federation) Troyes
	DF	Noah Ato-Zandanga	5 July 2003 (age 23)	9	0	(Swiss Football Association) Wil
	DF	Raphaël Yapéndé	20 August 2002 (age 24)	8	0	(Cameroonian Football Federation) Panthère du Ndé
	DF	Julien Kouadio	22 September 1999 (age 27)	5	0	(French Football Federation) Annecy
	DF	Sacha M'Baka	4 June 2004 (age 22)	5	0	(French Football Federation) Brest B
	DF	Chris Mbai-Assem	12 August 2005 (age 21)	2	0	(United States Soccer Federation) New England Revolution II
	DF	Emmanuel Okeke	24 December 2000 (age 25)	3	0	(Croatian Football Federation) NK Dubrava
	MF	Geoffrey Kondogbia	15 February 1993 (age 33)	23	3	(French Football Federation) Olympique de Marseille
	MF	Isaac Solet	16 June 2001 (age 25)	16	0	(Bulgarian Football Union) CSKA Sofia
	MF	Séverin Tatolna	10 February 2002 (age 24)	15	0	(Ukrainian Association of Football) Livyi Bereh Kyiv
	MF	Ghislain Mounguide	30 April 2002 (age 24)	5	0	(Central African Football Federation) DFC8
	MF	Junior Sambia	7 September 1996 (age 30)	5	0	(French Football Federation) Clermont
	MF	Badara Diomandé	3 July 1997 (age 29)	4	0	(Swiss Football Association) Neuchâtel Xamax
	MF	Joël Ngoya	3 January 2002 (age 24)	2	0	(French Football Federation) Valenciennes
	MF	Edwin Quarshie	28 October 1995 (age 31)	2	0	(French Football Federation) Le Mans
	MF	Sami Wattel	15 January 2006 (age 20)	2	0	(French Football Federation) Nice
	FW	Louis Mafouta	2 July 1994 (age 32)	35	17	(French Football Federation) Guingamp
	FW	Christian Yawanendji	16 May 2002 (age 24)	20	3	(South Sudan Football Association) Jamus
	FW	Goduine Koyalipou	15 February 2000 (age 26)	14	3	(French Football Federation) Angers
	FW	Moustapha Djimet	12 June 2003 (age 23)	12	0	(Football Federation of Belarus) Dinamo Minsk
	FW	Delphin Mokonou	28 October 2000 (age 26)	7	1	(Gabonese Football Federation) Lambarene AC

=== Recent call-ups ===
The following players have also been called up to the Central African Republic squad within the last twelve months.

Pos.	Player	Date of birth (age)	Caps	Goals	Club	Latest call-up
GK	Eugène Ganazoui		0	0	(Central African Republic) Douanes	v. Angola, 9 June 2026
GK	Désiré N'Zogué	19 July 1993 (age 33)	2	0	(Cameroon) YOSA	Training camp March 2026
DF	Stéphane Kaïmba	16 November 2005 (age 21)	1	0	(Burkina Faso) Aigle Noir	v. Burkina Faso, 30 Septemeber 2026
DF	Maurice Selemby	31 January 2004 (age 22)	2	0	(Italy) Castelfidardo	v. Angola, 9 June 2026
DF	Wesley Zahibo	6 February 2003 (age 23)	1	0	(France) Orléans B	v. Angola, 9 June 2026
DF	Yoan Zouma	6 May 1998 (age 28)	1	0	(France) Lyon-La Duchère	v. Angola, 9 June 2026
DF	Chérubin Basse	18 April 2004 (age 22)	7	0	(Central African Republic) Red Star Bangui	Training camp March 2026
DF	Fordeau Miambaye	9 November 1992 (age 34)	3	0	(Central African Republic) Tempete	Training camp March 2026
DF	Mike Bettinger	28 January 2004 (age 22)	0	0	(Belgium) Olympic Charleroi	Training camp March 2026
MF	Josias Sabone	28 August 2006 (age 20)	1	0	(Portugal) Torreense U23	v. Burkina Faso, 30 Septemeber 2026
MF	Brad Pirioua	6 March 2000 (age 26)	18	0	Unattached	Training camp March 2026
MF	Donald Guesset	11 January 1996 (age 30)	6	0	(Central African Republic) Douanes	Training camp March 2026
MF	Arnold Yangana	24 March 2004 (age 22)	4	0	(Central African Republic) Red Star Bangui	Training camp March 2026
MF	Albert Makoubé	13 February 1995 (age 31)	0	0	(Switzerland) Portalban	Training camp March 2026
MF	Ibrahim Sallet		0	0	(Central African Republic)	Training camp March 2026
FW	Vénuste Baboula	23 August 1998 (age 28)	23	4	(Slovenia) NK Bravo	v. Burkina Faso, 30 Septemeber 2026
FW	Karl Namnganda	8 February 1996 (age 30)	28	5	(Turkey) Göçmenköy	v. Angola, 9 June 2026
FW	Axel Urie	14 April 1999 (age 27)	9	0	(Serbia) Radnik Surdulica	Training camp March 2026
FW	Glayne Wago	11 March 2003 (age 23)	0	0	(Germany) FC Büderich	Training camp March 2026
^{INJ} Withdrew due to injury^{PRE} Preliminary squad^{RET} Retired from the national team^{SUS} Serving suspension^{WD} Player withdrew from the squad due to non-injury issue.

== Records ==
As of 5 June 2026
Players in bold are still active with Central African Republic.

=== Most appearances ===
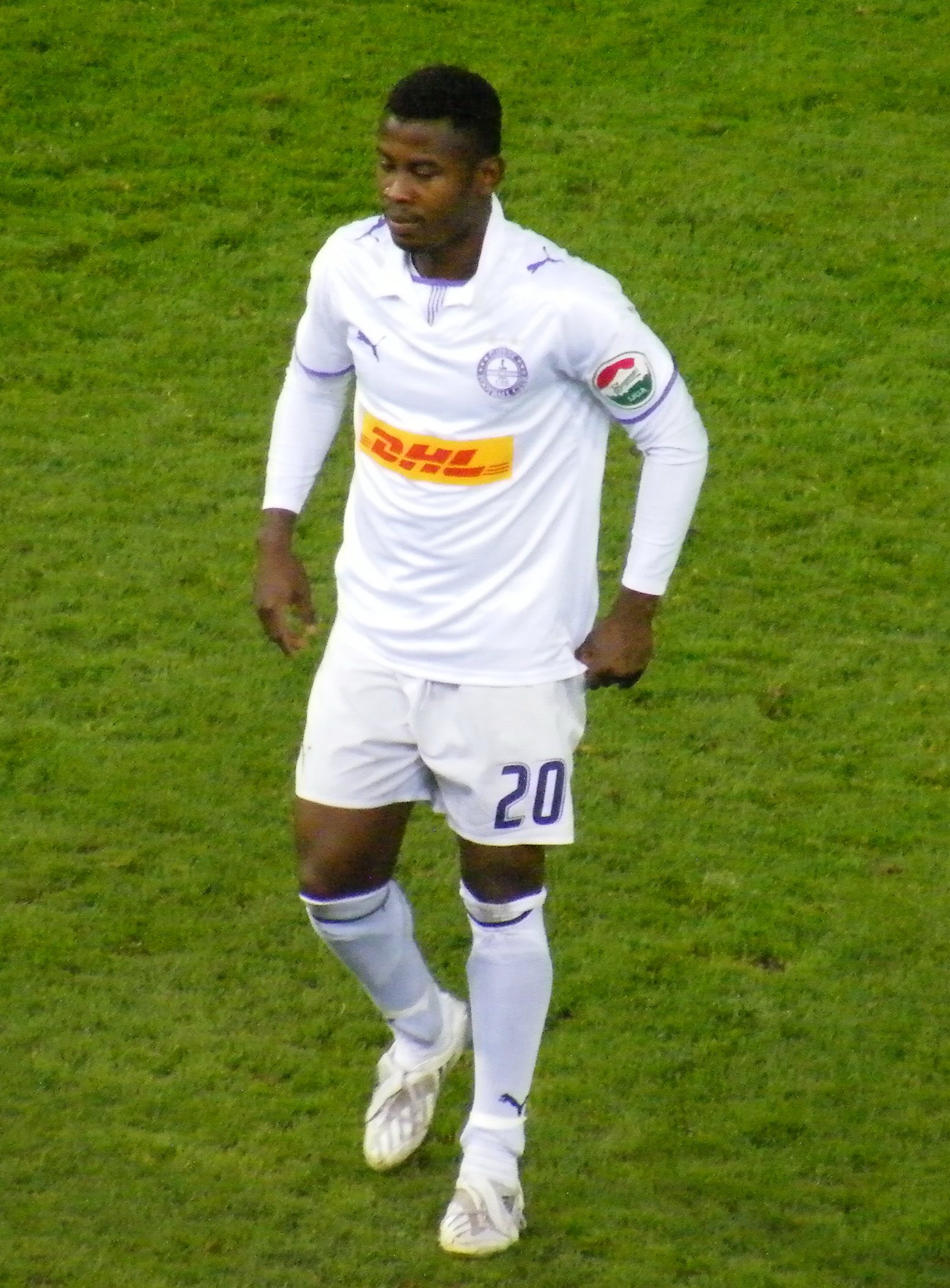
Foxi Kéthévoama is Central African Republic's most-capped player with 48 appearances.

Rank	Player	Caps	Goals	Career
1	Foxi Kéthévoama	49	8	2002–2021
2	**Geoffrey Lembet**	42	0	2010–present
3	**Flory Yangao**	39	0	2021–present
4	Franklin Anzité	37	0	2010–2019
5	**Sadock Ndobé**	36	0	2017–present
5	Nicaise Zimbori-Auzingoni	36	2	2011–2018
7	**Louis Mafouta**	33	16	2017–present
7	Hilaire Momi	33	10	2007–2018
7	Saint-Cyr Ngam Ngam	33	0	2015–2022
7	**Trésor Toropité**	33	6	2013–present

=== Top goalscorers ===
Rank	Player	Goals	Caps	Ratio	Career
1	**Louis Mafouta**	16	33	0.48	2017–present
2	Hilaire Momi	15	33	0.3	2007–2018
3	Foxi Kéthévoama	8	49	0.16	2002–2021
4	**Tresór Toropité**	6	33	0.18	2014–present
5	**Karl Namnganda**	5	28	0.18	2021–present
5	Vianney Mabidé	5	30	0.17	2010–2020
7	Moussa Limane	4	13	0.31	2013–2017
7	**Vénuste Baboula**	4	20	0.2	2023–present
7	Junior Gourrier	4	27	0.15	2007–2021
10	**Tieri Godame**	3	6	0.5	2024–present
10	**Isaac Ngoma**	3	18	0.17	2021–present
10	**Geoffrey Kondogbia**	3	22	0.14	2018–present
10	Salif Kéïta	3	31	0.1	2007–2021

== Competitive record ==
=== FIFA World Cup ===
FIFA World Cup record									FIFA World Cup qualification record					
Year	Round	Position	Pld	W	D*	L	GF	GA	Pld	W	D*	L	GF	GA
(Uruguay) 1930	Not a FIFA member								Not a FIFA member					
(Italy) 1934	Not a FIFA member								Not a FIFA member					
(France) 1938	Not a FIFA member								Not a FIFA member					
(Brazil) 1950	Not a FIFA member								Not a FIFA member					
(Switzerland) 1954	Not a FIFA member								Not a FIFA member					
(Sweden) 1958	Not a FIFA member								Not a FIFA member					
(Chile) 1962	Not a FIFA member								Not a FIFA member					
(England) 1966	Did not enter								Did not enter					
(Mexico) 1970	Did not enter								Did not enter					
(West Germany) 1974	Did not enter								Did not enter					
(Argentina) 1978	Withdrew								Withdrew					
(Spain) 1982	Disqualified during qualifying								Disqualified during qualifying					
(Mexico) 1986	Did not enter								Did not enter					
(Italy) 1990	Did not enter								Did not enter					
(United States) 1994	Did not enter								Did not enter					
(France) 1998	Did not enter								Did not enter					
(South Korea) (Japan) 2002	Did not qualify								2	0	0	2	1	4
(Germany) 2006	Withdrew								Withdrew					
(South Africa) 2010	Withdrew								Withdrew					
(Brazil) 2014	Did not qualify								6	1	0	5	5	12
(Russia) 2018	Did not qualify								2	0	1	1	2	5
(Qatar) 2022	Did not qualify								6	1	1	4	4	9
(Canada) (Mexico) (United States) 2026	Did not qualify								10	2	2	6	11	24
(Morocco) (Portugal) (Spain) 2030	To be determined								To be determined					
(Saudi Arabia) 2034	To be determined								To be determined					
Total	–	0/15	–	–	–	–	–	–	26	4	4	18	23	54

=== Africa Cup of Nations ===
Africa Cup of Nations record									Africa Cup of Nations qualification record					
Year	Round	Position	Pld	W	D*	L	GF	GA	Pld	W	D*	L	GF	GA
(Sudan) 1957	Part of France								Part of France					
(United Arab Republic) 1959	Part of France								Part of France					
(Ethiopia) 1962	Not affiliated to CAF								Not affiliated to CAF					
(Ghana) 1963	Not affiliated to CAF								Not affiliated to CAF					
(Tunisia) 1965	Not affiliated to CAF								Not affiliated to CAF					
(Ethiopia) 1968	Not affiliated to CAF								Not affiliated to CAF					
(Sudan) 1970	Did not enter								Did not enter					
(Cameroon) 1972	Did not enter								Did not enter					
(Egypt) 1974	Did not qualify								2	1	0	1	5	6
(Ethiopia) 1976	Withdrew								Withdrew					
(Ghana) 1978	Did not enter								Did not enter					
(Nigeria) 1980	Did not enter								Did not enter					
(Libya) 1982	Did not enter								Did not enter					
(Ivory Coast) 1984	Did not enter								Did not enter					
(Egypt) 1986	Did not enter								Did not enter					
(Morocco) 1988	Did not qualify								2	0	0	2	2	7
(Algeria) 1990	Did not enter								Did not enter					
(Senegal) 1992	Did not enter								Did not enter					
(Tunisia) 1994	Did not enter								Did not enter					
(South Africa) 1996	Withdrew								Withdrew					
(Burkina Faso) 1998	Disqualified								Disqualified					
(Ghana) (Nigeria) 2000	Did not enter								Did not enter					
(Mali) 2002	Did not qualify								2	0	1	1	1	3
(Tunisia) 2004	Did not qualify								6	0	2	4	3	9
(Egypt) 2006	Withdrew								Withdrew					
(Ghana) 2008	Did not enter								Did not enter					
(Angola) 2010	Withdrew								Withdrew					
(Equatorial Guinea) (Gabon) 2012	Did not qualify								6	2	2	2	5	5
(South Africa) 2013	Did not qualify								4	2	1	1	6	6
(Equatorial Guinea) 2015	Did not qualify								2	0	1	1	1	3
(Gabon) 2017	Did not qualify								6	3	1	2	9	11
(Egypt) 2019	Did not qualify								6	1	3	2	4	8
(Cameroon) 2021	Did not qualify								6	1	1	4	5	11
(Ivory Coast) 2023	Did not qualify								6	2	1	3	9	7
(Morocco) 2025	Did not qualify								6	1	0	5	3	14
(Kenya) (Tanzania) (Uganda) 2027	To be determined								To be determined					
2029	To be determined								To be determined					
Total	–	0/35	–	–	–	–	–	–	54	13	13	28	53	90

=== African Nations Championship ===
African Nations Championship record									African Nations Championship qualification record					
Year	Round	Position	Pld	W	D*	L	GF	GA	Pld	W	D*	L	GF	GA
(Ivory Coast) 2009	Did not enter								Did not enter					
(Sudan) 2011	Did not enter								Did not enter					
(South Africa) 2014	Withdrew								Withdrew					
(Rwanda) 2016	Withdrew								Withdrew					
(Morocco) 2018	Disqualified								Disqualified					
(Cameroon) 2020	Did not qualify								2	0	0	2	1	6
(Algeria) 2022	Did not qualify								2	1	0	1	2	2
(Kenya) (Tanzania) (Uganda) 2024	Group stage	18th	4	0	1	3	2	7	2	1	0	1	2	2
Total	Group stage	1/7	4	0	1	3	2	7	6	2	0	4	5	10

== Head-to-head record ==
As of 28 September 2026 after match against Burkina Faso

Positive Record Neutral Record Negative Record

Opponent	Pld	W	D	L	GF	GA	GD
Algeria	3	1	0	2	2	5	−3
Angola	5	1	0	4	5	11	−6
Bhutan	1	1	0	0	6	0	+6
Botswana	2	1	0	1	4	3	+1
Burkina Faso	7	1	1	5	6	14	−8
Burundi	2	1	1	0	4	2	+2
Cameroon	9	2	1	6	14	26	−12
Cape Verde	2	0	1	1	2	3	−1
Chad	10	6	1	3	16	12	+4
Comoros	2	0	0	2	2	6	−4
Congo	14	1	1	12	12	33	−21
DR Congo	9	1	1	7	8	30	−22
Equatorial Guinea	4	0	2	2	6	11	−5
Egypt	2	1	1	0	4	3	+1
Ethiopia	2	0	0	2	1	4	−3
Gabon	15	3	4	8	13	23	−10
Gambia	2	0	1	1	2	3	−1
Ghana	4	0	1	3	5	12	–7
Guinea	4	0	2	2	3	5	−2
Guinea-Bissau	2	0	1	1	1	3	−2
Ivory Coast	5	1	1	3	5	19	−14
Kenya	1	1	0	0	3	2	+1
Lesotho	2	1	0	1	3	2	+1
Liberia	3	0	1	2	2	5	−3
Libya	1	0	1	0	0	0	0
Madagascar	10	4	2	4	15	16	–1
Mali	4	0	2	2	5	8	−3
Malta	1	0	0	1	1	2	−1
Mauritania	5	0	0	5	2	9	−7
Morocco	7	0	2	5	1	19	−18
Mozambique	2	0	1	1	1	2	−2
Niger	2	1	1	0	2	0	+2
Nigeria	2	1	0	1	1	2	−1
Papua New Guinea	1	1	0	0	4	0	+4
Rwanda	4	1	1	2	4	10	−6
São Tomé and Príncipe	3	3	0	0	8	1	+7
Senegal	1	0	0	1	0	3	−3
Sierra Leone	1	0	1	0	0	0	0
South Africa	2	0	0	2	0	5	−5
Sudan	1	0	1	0	0	0	0
Tanzania	4	1	1	2	4	6	−2
Togo	2	0	1	1	1	2	−1
Tunisia	1	0	0	1	0	3	−3
Uganda	1	1	0	0	1	0	+1
Zimbabwe	2	0	0	2	1	4	−3
Total	166	36	35	97	179	321	−142

== FIFA ranking history ==
End of each year only

View source data.

== Honours ==
=== Regional ===
- CEMAC Cup
  - (gold) Champions (1): 2009
  - (silver) Runners-up (1): 2003
- UNIFAC Cup
  - (silver) Runners-up (1): 1999

=== Friendly ===
- FIFA Series (1): 2024 Sri Lanka
