= Ryan Khedoo =

Canadian-Guyanese soccer player

Personal information
- Date of birth: October 27, 1999 (age 27)
- Place of birth: Brampton, Ontario, Canada
- Height: 1.67 m (5 ft 5 1/2 in)
- Positions: Midfielder; forward

Team information
- Current team: St. Louis Ambush
- Number: 27

Youth career
- Brampton East SC
- Brampton SC
- Dixie SC
- Burlington SC
- Toronto FC
- Woodbridge Strikers

College career
Years	Team	Apps	(Gls)
2017	Hill Rebels	12	(1)
2018	St. Louis Archers	21	(3)
2019–2021	Kansas City Roos	30	(5)
2021	UC Irvine Anteaters	20	(1)

Senior career*
Years	Team	Apps	(Gls)
2018	Scarborough SC B	7	(5)
2019	FC Florida U23	3	(0)
2021	FC Wichita	5	(0)
2022	Vaughan Azzurri	8	(0)
2023	Sigma FC	16	(7)
2024	St. Louis Ambush (indoor)	3	(0)
2024	St. Charles FC	8	(1)
2024–	St. Louis Ambush (indoor)	0	(0)

International career^{‡}
2024–	Guyana	1	(1)
- * Club domestic league appearances and goals as of November 27, 2024 ‡ National team caps and goals as of March 26, 2024

Ryan Khedoo (born October 27, 1999) is a soccer player who plays for the St. Louis Ambush in the Major Arena Soccer League. Born in Canada, he represents Guyana internationally.

== Early life ==
Khedoo began playing youth soccer at age seven with Brampton East SC. He also played with Brampton SC, Dixie SC, and Burlington SC. He joined the Toronto FC Academy for two years before joining the Woodbridge Strikers for three years. He played for Team Ontario at the U14 through U16 levels.

== College career ==
In 2017, Khedoo began attending Hill College, where he played for the men's soccer team.

In 2018, he began attending St. Louis Community College, where he played for the men's soccer team.

For 2019, he transferred to the University of Missouri–Kansas City for his junior season to play for the men's soccer team. He scored his first goal on October 11 against the Incarnate Word Cardinals, scoring the winning goal in a 2-1 double overtime victory. later earning WAC Offensive Player of the Week honours. At the end of the season, he was named to the All-WAC Second Team. Ahead of his senior season, he was named a Summit League Player to Watch. At the end of the 2021 Spring season (delayed from 2020 Fall due to the COVID-19 pandemic), he was named to the All-Summit League Second Team, after leading the league with five assists.

For his graduate year, he moved to the University of California, Irvine and joined the men's soccer team. On October 30, 2021, he scored his first goal in a 1–0 victory over the Cal State Fullerton Titans. for which he earned Big West Conference Offensive Player of the Week honours.

== Club career ==
In 2018, he played with Scarborough SC B in the Canadian Soccer League Second Division.

In 2019, he played with FC Florida U23 in USL League Two. In April 2021, he signed with FC Wichita in USL League Two.

In 2022, Khedoo played with Vaughan Azzurri in League1 Ontario. In 2023, he played with Sigma FC in League1 Ontario.

On February 29, 2024, he joined indoor side St. Louis Ambush of the Major Arena Soccer League. In 2024, he played with St. Charles FC in USL League Two.

== International career ==
Khedoo was born in Canada to parents from Guyana.

In March 2014, he was called up to a camp for the Canada U15 team.

In June 2021, he played in an unofficial friendly, behind closed doors, scoring the lone goal in a 1–0 victory over The Bahamas. He then scored in another training match on June 29, in a 1–0 victory over Bermuda. On March 22, 2024, he became the first Guyanese player to score in Saudi Arabia, netting a goal in a 1–1 draw in a practice match against Saudi First Division League club team Jeddah Club. He scored his first official international goal on March 26, 2024, in a 4–1 victory over Cambodia at the 2024 FIFA Series in Saudi Arabia.

=== International goals ===
No.	Date	Venue	Opponent	Score	Result	Competition
X	June 2021	Miami, Florida, United States	Bahamas	1–0	1–0	Unofficial closed-door exhibition
X	June 29, 2021	The Gardens North County District Park, Palm Beach, Florida, United States	Bermuda	1–0	1–0	Unofficial closed-door exhibition
X	March 22, 2024	Prince Abdullah Al-Faisal Sports City, Jeddah, Saudi Arabia	(Saudi Arabia) Jeddah Club	1–0	1–1	Unofficial closed-door exhibition
1.	March 26, 2024	Prince Abdullah Al-Faisal Sports City, Jeddah, Saudi Arabia	Cambodia	4–1	4–1	2024 FIFA Series
