= Saint-Cyr Ngam Ngam =

Central African Republic footballer

Personal information
- Date of birth: 27 January 1993 (age 33)
- Place of birth: Bangui, Central African Republic
- Height: 1.75 m (5 ft 9 in)
- Position: Right-back

Team information
- Current team: DFC8

Senior career*
Years	Team	Apps	(Gls)
2012–2013	DFC8		
2013–2016	Stade Migovéen		
2016–2017	Eding Sport		
2017–	DFC8		

International career^{‡}
2015–	Central African Republic	24	(0)
- * Club domestic league appearances and goals as of 22:37, 1 September 2021 (UTC) ‡ National team caps and goals as of 22:37, 1 September 2021 (UTC)

Saint-Cyr Ngam Ngam (born 27 January 1993) is a Central African professional footballer who plays as a right-back for DFC8 and the Central African Republic national team.

== Club career ==
Ngam Ngam debuted with the Central African Republic national team in a 4–0 2017 Africa Cup of Nations qualification loss to Angola on 13 June 2015.
