= Sadock Ndobé =

Central African Republic footballer

Personal information
- Full name: Stéphane Sadock Ndobé
- Date of birth: 9 September 1998 (age 28)
- Place of birth: Bangui, Central African Republic
- Height: 1.93 m (6 ft 4 in)
- Position: Centre-back

Team information
- Current team: Tempête Mocaf
- Number: 4

Senior career*
Years	Team	Apps	(Gls)
2017–2019	Anges de Fatima		
2019–	Tempête Mocaf		

International career^{‡}
2017–	Central African Republic	10	(0)
- * Club domestic league appearances and goals as of 22:37, 1 September 2021 (UTC) ‡ National team caps and goals as of 22:37, 1 September 2021 (UTC)

Stéphane Sadock Ndobé (born 9 September 1998) is a Central African footballer who plays as a centre-back for Tempête Mocaf and the Central African Republic national team.

== Club career ==
Ndobé debuted with the Central African Republic national team in a 2–1 friendly win over the Gambia on 27 March 2017.
