= Joanet =

Equatoguinean footballer (born 1999)

Personal information
- Full name: Joan López Eló
- Date of birth: 1 March 1999 (age 27)
- Place of birth: Lleida, Spain
- Height: 1.77 m (5 ft 10 in)
- Positions: Midfielder; forward

Team information
- Current team: Linense

Youth career
- –2018: Lleida Esportiu

Senior career*
Years	Team	Apps	(Gls)
2018–2019	Lleida Esportiu B	29	(0)
2019–2022	Lleida Esportiu	55	(3)
2022–2023	Sabadell	11	(2)
2023–2024	Inter d'Escaldes	19	(0)
2024–2026	Atlètic Lleida	45	(1)
2026–	Linense	0	(0)

International career^{‡}
2021–	Equatorial Guinea	9	(1)
- * Club domestic league appearances and goals as of 27 May 2024 ‡ National team caps and goals as of 11 January 2026

Joan López Eló (born 1 March 1999), known as Joanet, is a professional footballer who plays as a midfielder for Tercera Federación club Linense. Born in Spain, he plays for the Equatorial Guinea national team.

== Early life ==
Joanet was born in Alcoletge to a Spanish father and an Equatoguinean Fang mother.

== Club career ==
On 3 February 2026, Joanet joined Real Balompédica Linense.

== International career ==
Joanet was first called up for Equatorial Guinea national team in November 2019. He made his debut on 28 March 2021.

== Career statistics ==
=== International ===
As of 22 March 2024

Equatorial Guinea
Year	Apps	Goals
2021	2	0
2022	5	0
2023	1	0
2024	1	1
Total	9	1

Scores and results list Equatorial Guinea's goal tally first.

No.	Date	Venue	Opponent	Score	Result	Competition
1.	22 March 2024	Prince Abdullah Al-Faisal Sports City, Jeddah, Saudi Arabia	Cambodia	2–0	2–0	2024 FIFA Series
