= 2024 FIFA Series =

Tournament details
- Host countries: Algeria; Azerbaijan; Egypt; Saudi Arabia; Sri Lanka
- Dates: 21–26 March
- Teams: 24 (from 6 confederations)
- Venues: 9 (in 7 host cities)

Final positions
- Champions: Croatia

Tournament statistics
- Matches played: 24
- Goals scored: 68 (2.83 per match)
- Attendance: 197,990 (8,250 per match)
- Top scorer(s): (Algeria) Yassine Benzia (Central African Republic) Tieri-Teddy Godame (Guinea) Mamadou Kané (Guinea) Morlaye Sylla (3 goals each)

The 2024 FIFA Series was an invitational football tournament promoted by FIFA as part of the inaugural FIFA Series. The tournament was formed as an initiative to aid the development of national association football teams through international friendly matches. The competition had two parts: five friendlies and one final championship match. It involved men's national teams from different continental confederations and took place across five host countries from 21 to 26 March 2024. Croatia defeated Egypt 4–2 in the final match, becoming the tournament's first champions.

== Background ==
The project was first announced as a FIFA initiative in December 2022 under the name "FIFA World Series", and later confirmed by FIFA President Gianni Infantino on 16 March 2023 following his re-election to the post during the 73rd FIFA Congress in Kigali, Rwanda. The competition will bring together men's national teams from its six confederations in a series of friendly matches during the FIFA match window in March of every even-numbered year. The matches are intended to provide FIFA's member associations with "key playing opportunities" by allowing them to more regularly play teams from other confederations which they would otherwise not face, allowing for greater technical development opportunities. It intended to provide member associations with additional commercial opportunities and exposure.

The 2024 edition acted as a pilot phase for the project and had two parts: five friendlies and one final championship match. In each series apart from Egypt (which was a late addition), all inter-confederation fixtures were the first international meeting between the sides. The winners of the final championship match were awarded gold medals and the ACUD Cup Trophy after the tournament.

== Participating teams ==
The following teams participated in the 2024 event.

Series	Team	Confederation	FIFA Rankings February 2024
Algeria	Algeria	CAF	43
Algeria	Andorra	UEFA	164
Algeria	Bolivia	CONMEBOL	86
Algeria	South Africa	CAF	58
Azerbaijan	Azerbaijan	UEFA	113
Azerbaijan	Bulgaria	UEFA	83
Azerbaijan	Mongolia	AFC	190
Azerbaijan	Tanzania	CAF	119
Egypt	Croatia	UEFA	10
Egypt	Egypt	CAF	36
Egypt	New Zealand	OFC	103
Egypt	Tunisia	CAF	41
Saudi Arabia A	Cambodia	AFC	179
Saudi Arabia A	Cape Verde	CAF	65
Saudi Arabia A	Equatorial Guinea	CAF	79
Saudi Arabia A	Guyana	CONCACAF	157
Saudi Arabia B	Bermuda	CONCACAF	171
Saudi Arabia B	Brunei	AFC	194
Saudi Arabia B	Guinea	CAF	76
Saudi Arabia B	Vanuatu	OFC	170
Sri Lanka	Bhutan	AFC	184
Sri Lanka	Central African Republic	CAF	129
Sri Lanka	Papua New Guinea	OFC	165
Sri Lanka	Sri Lanka	AFC	204

=== By confederation ===
Confederation	Teams
AFC	5
CAF	9
CONCACAF	2
CONMEBOL	1
OFC	3
UEFA	4

== Venues ==
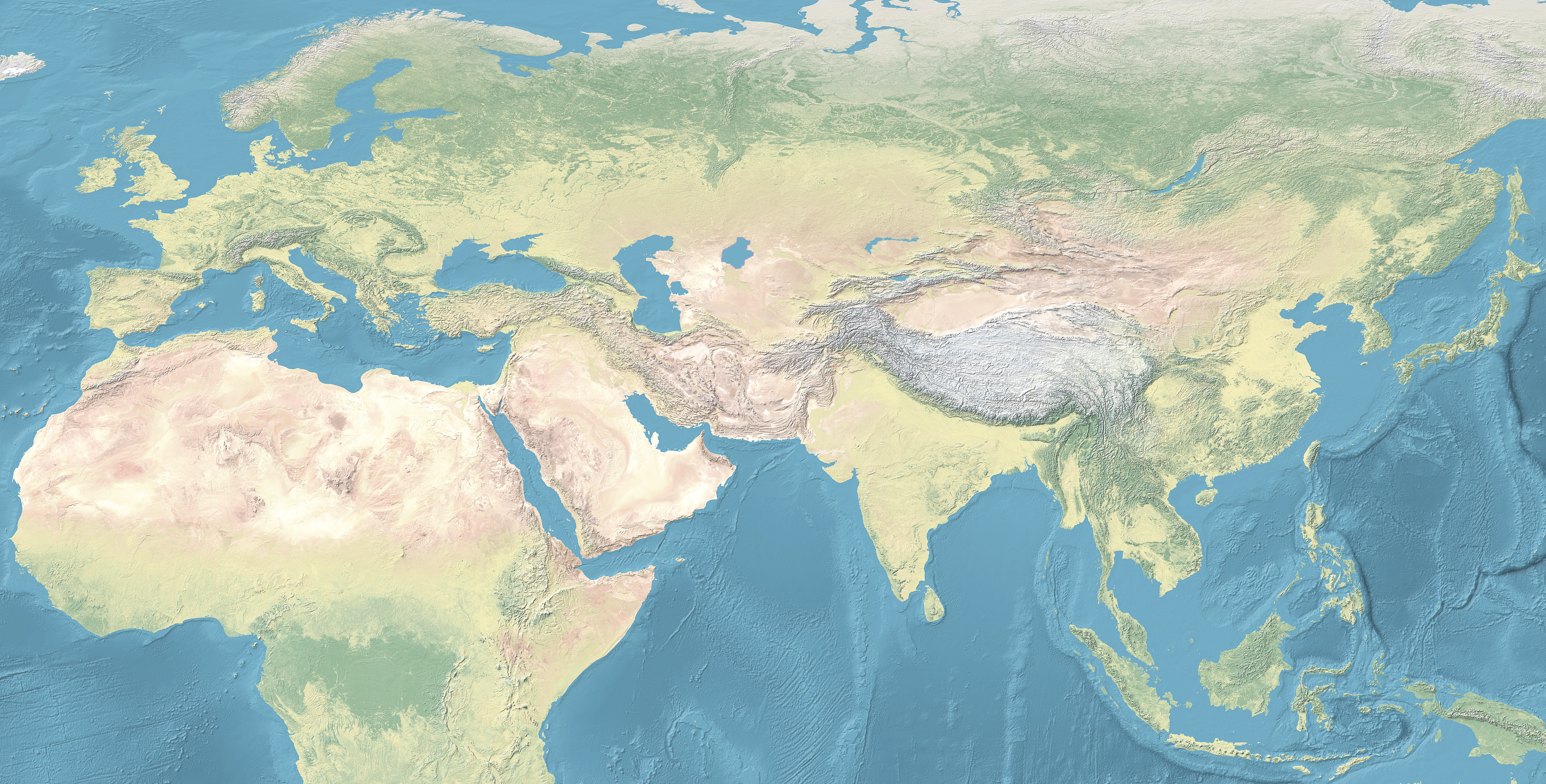
Location of the 2024 FIFA Series venues

Country	City	Stadium	Capacity
Algeria	Algiers	Nelson Mandela Stadium	40,784
Algeria	Annaba	19 May 1956 Stadium	56,000
Azerbaijan	Baku	Dalga Arena	6,500
Azerbaijan	Baku	Tofiq Bahramov Republican Stadium	31,200
Egypt	Cairo	Cairo International Stadium	75,000
Egypt	New Administrative Capital	Misr Stadium	93,940
Saudi Arabia	Jeddah	King Abdullah Sports City	62,345
Saudi Arabia	Jeddah	Prince Abdullah Al-Faisal Sports City	27,000
Sri Lanka	Colombo	Colombo Racecourse	10,000

== Series ==
The first five series were organized as international friendlies while the last series in Egypt featured a knockout format, with winners determined by a penalty shoot-out following a tie.

All times are local. Each team's confederation is indicated in brackets.

=== Algeria ===
The FIFA Series: Algeria took place in Annaba and Algiers from 21 to 26 March 2024, and involved the hosts Algeria (CAF), Andorra (UEFA), Bolivia (CONMEBOL) and South Africa (CAF). Andorra entered the series as a replacement for Albania, which had originally been invited but preferred to play friendlies in Europe, considering them better preparation ahead of UEFA Euro 2024.

Initially, the series was expected to be played in a different format, with semi-finals to be played in Oran and Annaba and the finals to be played in Algiers.

Pos	Team	Pld	W	D	L	GF	GA	GD	Pts
1	Algeria (H)	2	1	1	0	6	5	+1	4
2	Bolivia	2	1	0	1	3	3	0	3
3	South Africa	2	0	2	0	4	4	0	2
4	Andorra	2	0	1	1	1	2	−1	1

(H) Hosts
21 March 2024
22:00 UTC+1

Andorra	1–1	South Africa
R. Fernández 5'	Report	Mokwana 25'

19 May 1956 Stadium, Annaba
Attendance: 2,500
Referee: Nabil Boukhalfa (Algeria)
22 March 2024
22:00 UTC+1

Algeria	3–2	Bolivia
Gouiri 43'; Benzia 79'; Mandi 90+3'	Report	Algarañaz 47'; Sagredo 70'

Nelson Mandela Stadium, Algiers
Attendance: 17,000
Referee: Abdel Aziz Bouh (Mauritania)

25 March 2024
22:00 UTC+1

Bolivia	1–0	Andorra
Vaca 13'	Report

19 May 1956 Stadium, Annaba
Attendance: 2,500
Referee: Houssam Benyahia (Algeria)
26 March 2024
22:00 UTC+1

Algeria	3–3	South Africa
Benzia 22', 70'; Brahimi 53'	Report	Zwane 34', 45+5'; Rayners 66'

Nelson Mandela Stadium, Algiers
Attendance: 35,000
Referee: Amir Loussaif (Tunisia)

=== Azerbaijan ===
The FIFA Series: Azerbaijan took place in Baku on 22 and 25 March 2024, and involved the hosts Azerbaijan (UEFA), Bulgaria (UEFA), Mongolia (AFC) and Tanzania (CAF).

Pos	Team	Pld	W	D	L	GF	GA	GD	Pts
1	Bulgaria	2	1	1	0	2	1	+1	4
2	Azerbaijan (H)	2	1	1	0	2	1	+1	4
3	Tanzania	2	1	0	1	3	1	+2	3
4	Mongolia	2	0	0	2	0	4	−4	0

(H) Hosts
22 March 2024
17:00 UTC+4

Tanzania	0–1	Bulgaria
	Report	Despodov 52'

Dalga Arena, Baku
Attendance: 154
Referee: Aliyar Aghayev (Azerbaijan)
22 March 2024
20:00 UTC+4

Azerbaijan	1–0	Mongolia
Mustafazadə 90+1'	Report

Tofiq Bahramov Republican Stadium, Baku
Attendance: 3,875
Referee: Zorbay Küçük (Turkey)

25 March 2024
17:00 UTC+4

Tanzania	3–0	Mongolia
John 49'; Sopu 62'; Miroshi 76'	Report

Dalga Arena, Baku
Attendance: 146
Referee: Elçin Məsiyev (Azerbaijan)
25 March 2024
20:00 UTC+4

Azerbaijan	1–1	Bulgaria
Qurbanlı 87'	Report	Krastev 59'

Tofiq Bahramov Republican Stadium, Baku
Attendance: 3,220
Referee: Kristo Tohver (Estonia)

=== Egypt (ACUD Cup) ===
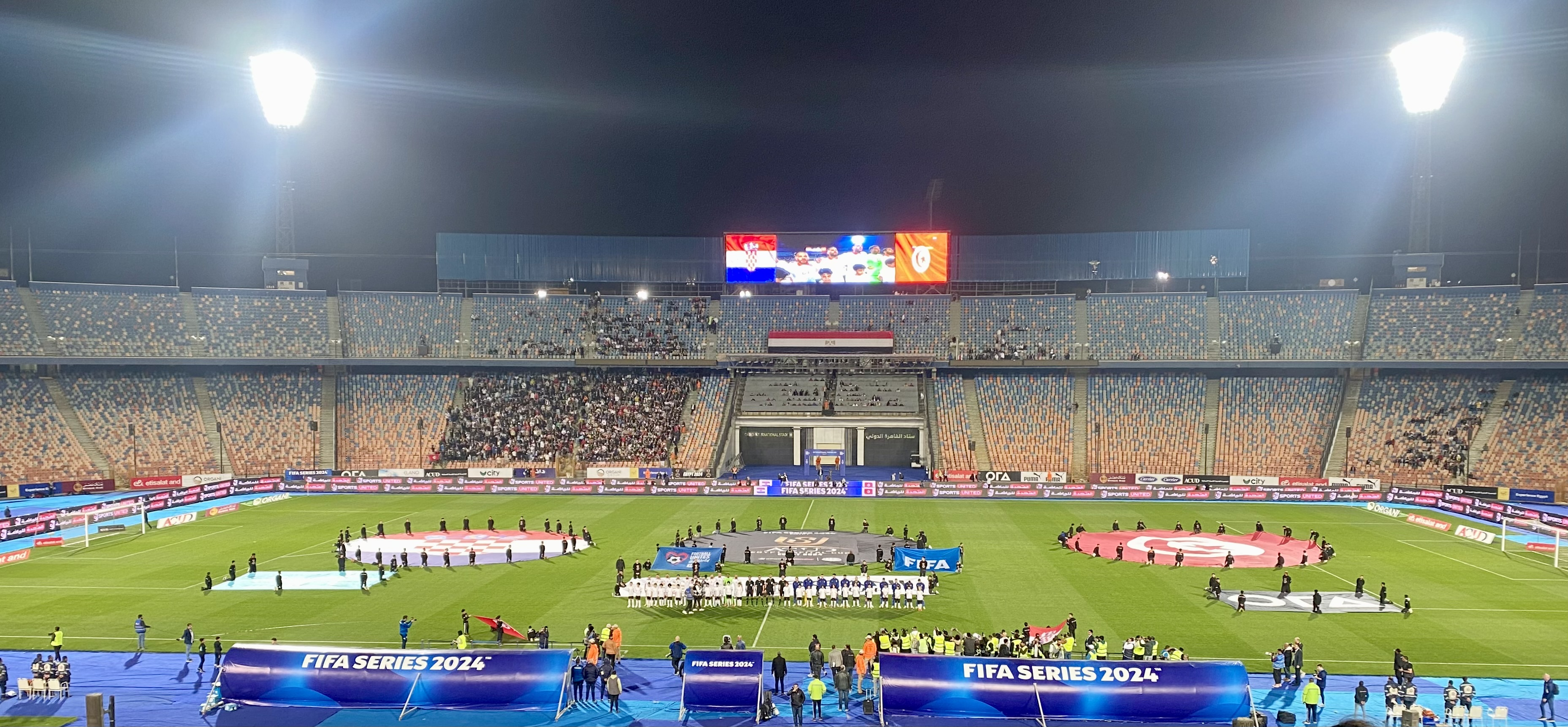
Croatia v Tunisia

The FIFA Series: Egypt, also known as the ACUD International Football Cup, took place in Cairo and the New Administrative Capital on 22, 23 and 26 March 2024, and involved the hosts Egypt (CAF), Croatia (UEFA), New Zealand (OFC) and Tunisia (CAF).

The tournament was originally not part of the FIFA Series, but a separate cup event called the Winsunited Cup (W Cup). It was scheduled to be played in Abu Dhabi, United Arab Emirates. However, due to sponsorship issues, on 14 March 2024 the tournament was moved to Egypt, and became part of the FIFA Series.

Croatia won the tournament following a 4–2 victory over the hosts Egypt in the final championship match.

==== Bracket ====
Semi-finals
22 March – New Administrative Capital
Egypt	1
New Zealand	0
23 March – Cairo
Tunisia	0 (4)
Croatia (p)	0 (5)

Final
26 March – New Administrative Capital
Egypt	2
Croatia	4
Third place play-off
26 March – Cairo
New Zealand	0 (2)
Tunisia (p)	0 (4)

==== Semi-finals ====
22 March 2024
22:00 UTC+2

Egypt	1–0	New Zealand
Mostafa 29' (pen.)	Report

Misr Stadium, New Administrative Capital
Attendance: 30,200
Referee: Clement Franklin Kpan (Ivory Coast)

23 March 2024
22:00 UTC+2

Tunisia	0–0	Croatia
	Report
Penalties
Ben Romdhane (penalty scored); Laïdouni (penalty scored); Abdi (penalty scored); Jelassi (penalty missed); Ltaief (penalty scored); Jaziri (penalty missed); Haddadi (penalty missed)	4–5	(penalty missed) Vlašić; (penalty scored) Kramarić; (penalty scored) Petković; (penalty scored) Majer; (penalty scored) Mario Pašalić; (penalty missed) Juranović; (penalty scored) Marco Pašalić

Cairo International Stadium, Cairo
Attendance: 4,300
Referee: Mohamed Maarouf (Egypt)

==== Third place play-off ====
26 March 2024
22:00 UTC+2

New Zealand	0–0	Tunisia
	Report
Penalties
Waine (penalty missed); Barbarouses (penalty scored); Just (penalty missed); Rufer (penalty scored)	2–4	(penalty scored) Ben Romdhane; (penalty scored) Laïdouni; (penalty scored) Abdi; (penalty scored) Ghram

Cairo International Stadium, Cairo
Attendance: 45
Referee: Ahmed El Ghandour (Egypt)

==== Final ====
26 March 2024
22:00 UTC+2

Egypt	2–4	Croatia
Rabia 6'; Abdelmonem 90+4'	Report	Vlašić 21'; Petković 57'; Kramarić 77'; Majer 86'

Misr Stadium, New Administrative Capital
Attendance: 85,350
Referee: Adalbert Diouf (Senegal)

=== Saudi Arabia A ===
The FIFA Series: Saudi Arabia A took place in Jeddah from 21 to 26 March 2024, and involved Cambodia (AFC), Cape Verde (CAF), Equatorial Guinea (CAF) and Guyana (CONCACAF).

Pos	Team	Pld	W	D	L	GF	GA	GD	Pts
1	Cape Verde	2	2	0	0	2	0	+2	6
2	Guyana	2	1	0	1	4	2	+2	3
3	Equatorial Guinea	2	1	0	1	2	1	+1	3
4	Cambodia	2	0	0	2	1	6	−5	0

21 March 2024
22:00 UTC+3

Cape Verde	1–0	Guyana
Mendes 2'	Report

Prince Abdullah Al-Faisal Sports City, Jeddah
Attendance: 70
Referee: Shukri Al-Hunfush (Saudi Arabia)
22 March 2024
22:00 UTC+3

Equatorial Guinea	2–0	Cambodia
Nlavo 10'; Joanet 36'	Report

Prince Abdullah Al-Faisal Sports City, Jeddah
Attendance: 35
Referee: Hussain Al-Shuwaikh (Bahrain)

25 March 2024
22:00 UTC+3

Cape Verde	1–0	Equatorial Guinea
Cabral 64'	Report

Prince Abdullah Al-Faisal Sports City, Jeddah
Attendance: 45
Referee: Qasim Matar Al-Hatmi (Oman)
26 March 2024
22:00 UTC+3

Guyana	4–1	Cambodia
Glasgow 20', 59' (pen.); Lovell 80'; Khedoo 90+2'	Report	Chanthea 53'

Prince Abdullah Al-Faisal Sports City, Jeddah
Attendance: 46
Referee: Faisal Suleiman Al-Balawi (Saudi Arabia)

=== Saudi Arabia B ===
The FIFA Series: Saudi Arabia B took place in Jeddah from 21 to 26 March 2024, and involved Bermuda (CONCACAF), Brunei (AFC), Guinea (CAF) and Vanuatu (OFC).

Initially Curaçao was also expected to participate, but they were eventually replaced by Bermuda.

Pos	Team	Pld	W	D	L	GF	GA	GD	Pts
1	Guinea	2	2	0	0	11	1	+10	6
2	Brunei	2	1	0	1	3	4	−1	3
3	Bermuda	2	1	0	1	3	5	−2	3
4	Vanuatu	2	0	0	2	2	9	−7	0

21 March 2024
22:00 UTC+3

Guinea	6–0	Vanuatu
Sylla 9' (pen.), 63'; Diawara 10'; O. Camara 18'; Kané 39' (pen.), 58'	Report

King Abdullah Sports City, Jeddah
Attendance: 148
Referee: Ahmed Al Ali (Jordan)
22 March 2024
22:00 UTC+3

Bermuda	2–0	Brunei
Todd 82'; Parfitt-Williams 88'	Report

King Abdullah Sports City, Jeddah
Attendance: 45
Referee: Qasim Matar Al-Hatmi (Oman)

25 March 2024
22:00 UTC+3

Guinea	5–1	Bermuda
Sylla 11'; M. Bangoura 48'; Diawara 51'; J. Keita 61'; Kané 70'	Report	Bean 15'

King Abdullah Sports City, Jeddah
Attendance: 102
Referee: Sami Ahmed Al-Jurays (Saudi Arabia)
26 March 2024
22:00 UTC+3

Vanuatu	2–3	Brunei
Kalo 38'; Iawak 71'	Report	Syafiq 53'; Nur Ikhwan 73'; Hakeme 90+4'

King Abdullah Sports City, Jeddah
Attendance: 150
Referee: Abdullah Dhafer Al-Shehri (Saudi Arabia)

=== Sri Lanka ===
The FIFA Series: Sri Lanka took place in Colombo on 22 and 25 March 2024, and involved the hosts Sri Lanka (AFC), Bhutan (AFC), Central African Republic (CAF) and Papua New Guinea (OFC).

The tournament acted as a successor to the 2021 Four Nations Football Tournament, also held at the same venue.

Pos	Team	Pld	W	D	L	GF	GA	GD	Pts
1	Central African Republic	2	2	0	0	10	0	+10	6
2	Sri Lanka (H)	2	1	1	0	2	0	+2	4
3	Papua New Guinea	2	0	1	1	0	4	−4	1
4	Bhutan	2	0	0	2	0	8	−8	0

(H) Hosts
22 March 2024
15:00 UTC+5:30

Central African Republic	6–0	Bhutan
Toropité 16'; Baboula 48', 90+3'; Namnganda 49', 64'; Dangabo 56'	Report

Colombo Racecourse, Colombo
Attendance: 1,100
Referee: Mohamed Jafran (Sri Lanka)
22 March 2024
20:45 UTC+5:30

Sri Lanka	0–0	Papua New Guinea
	Report

Colombo Racecourse, Colombo
Attendance: 5,089
Referee: Meshari Ali Al Shammari (Qatar)

25 March 2024
15:00 UTC+5:30

Central African Republic	4–0	Papua New Guinea
Yawanendji-Malipangou 11'; Godame 25', 43', 78'	Report

Colombo Racecourse, Colombo
Attendance: 550
Referee: Hettikamkanamge Perera (Sri Lanka)
25 March 2024
20:45 UTC+5:30

Sri Lanka	2–0	Bhutan
De Silva 46'; Kelaart 54'	Report

Colombo Racecourse, Colombo
Attendance: 6,320
Referee: Meshari Ali Al Shammari (Qatar)

== Summary ==
2024 FIFA Series (men's) summary
Tournament	Champions	Runners-up	Third-place
Egypt	Croatia	Egypt	Tunisia

== Goalscorers ==
There were 68 goals scored in 24 matches, for an average of 2.83 goals per match.

3 goals

- (Algeria) Yassine Benzia
- (Central African Republic) Tieri-Teddy Godame
- (Guinea) Mamadou Kané
- (Guinea) Morlaye Sylla

2 goals

- (Central African Republic) Vénuste Baboula
- (Central African Republic) Karl Namnganda
- (Guinea) Kandet Diawara
- (Guyana) Omari Glasgow
- (South Africa) Themba Zwane

1 goal

- (Algeria) Yacine Brahimi
- (Algeria) Amine Gouiri
- (Algeria) Aïssa Mandi
- (Andorra) Ricard Fernández
- (Azerbaijan) Bəhlul Mustafazadə
- (Azerbaijan) Musa Qurbanlı
- (Bermuda) Jai Bean
- (Bermuda) Djair Parfitt-Williams
- (Bermuda) Aundè Todd
- (Bolivia) Carmelo Algarañaz
- (Bolivia) José Sagredo
- (Bolivia) Ramiro Vaca
- (Brunei) Hakeme Yazid Said
- (Brunei) Nur Ikhwan Othman
- (Brunei) Syafiq Safiuddin Shariff
- (Bulgaria) Kiril Despodov
- (Bulgaria) Filip Krastev
- (Cambodia) Sieng Chanthea
- (Cape Verde) Jovane Cabral
- (Cape Verde) Ryan Mendes
- (Central African Republic) Hamissou Dangabo
- (Central African Republic) Trésor Toropité
- (Central African Republic) Christian-Theodor Yawanendji-Malipangou
- (Croatia) Andrej Kramarić
- (Croatia) Lovro Majer
- (Croatia) Bruno Petković
- (Croatia) Nikola Vlašić
- (Egypt) Mohamed Abdelmonem
- (Egypt) Mostafa Mohamed
- (Egypt) Ramy Rabia
- (Equatorial Guinea) Joanet
- (Equatorial Guinea) Luis Nlavo
- (Guinea) Ousmane Camara
- (Guinea) Mohamed Bangoura
- (Guinea) Jules Keita
- (Guyana) Ryan Khedoo
- (Guyana) Leo-Orion Lovell
- (South Africa) Elias Mokwana
- (South Africa) Iqraam Rayners
- (Sri Lanka) Dillon De Silva
- (Sri Lanka) Oliver Kelaart
- (Tanzania) Kelvin John
- (Tanzania) Novatus Miroshi
- (Tanzania) Abdul Sopu
- (Vanuatu) Bong Kalo
- (Vanuatu) Joe Moses
