= Xavier Dudoit =

French footballer (born 1975)

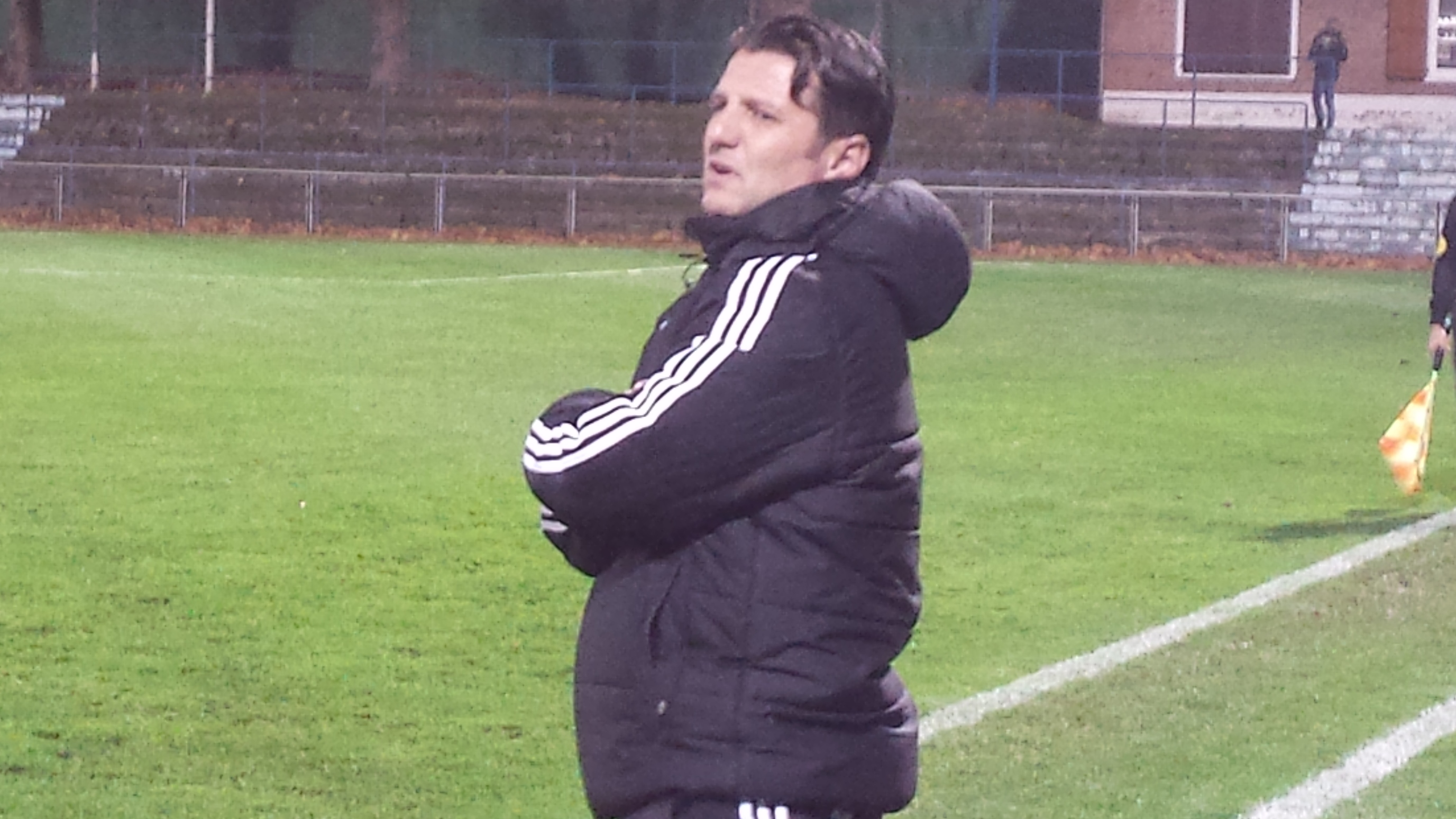

Personal information
- Date of birth: February 28, 1975 (age 51)
- Place of birth: Thouars, France
- Height: 1.65 m (5 ft 5 in)
- Position: Midfielder

Team information
- Current team: Stade Poitevin FC (head coach)

Senior career*
| Years | Team | Apps | (Gls) |
| 1990–1993 | Rennes B | | |
| 1993–1997 | AS Vitré | | |
| 1997–2000 | Thouars Foot 79 | | |
| 2000–2002 | Lorient | 49 | (5) |
| 2003 | Reims | 16 | (0) |
| 2003–2010 | Romorantin | | |

Managerial career
- 2010–2018: Romorantin
- 2021–: Stade Poitevin
- * Club domestic league appearances and goals

Xavier Dudoit (born February 28, 1975) is a French former professional footballer who was appointed head coach of Stade Poitevin FC in June 2021.

He played on the professional level in Ligue 1 for FC Lorient and in Ligue 2 for FC Lorient and Stade de Reims.

He played 1 game in the 2002–03 UEFA Cup for FC Lorient.
