= Tieri Godame =

Central African Republic footballer (born 2001)

Personal information
- Full name: Tieri-Teddy Morgan Schadrac Godame
- Date of birth: 9 July 2002 (age 24)
- Place of birth: Bangui, Central African Republic
- Height: 1.83 m (6 ft 0 in)
- Position: Forward

Team information
- Current team: FC Chauray

Youth career
- 2013–2018: Nantes
- 2018–2020: Vertou
- 2020–2021: Challans

Senior career*
Years	Team	Apps	(Gls)
2021–2024	Challans	64	(27)
2024–2025	Guingamp B	25	(9)
2024–2025	Guingamp	3	(0)
2025–	FC Chauray	12	(4)

International career
2024–	Central African Republic	6	(3)
- * Club domestic league appearances and goals as of 12 December 2025

Tieri-Teddy Morgan Schadrac Godame (born 9 July 2002) is a Central African professional footballer who plays as a forward for French National 2 club FC Chauray and the Central African Republic national team.

== Career ==
Born in the Central African Republic, Godame moved to France at the age of 4. He is a product of the youth academies of Nantes and Vertou, before moving to Challans in 2020. On 2 July 2024, he signed a one-year contract with the Ligue 2 club Guingamp. He debuted with their senior team in the Championnat National 3, and He made his professional debut with Guingamp in a 4–0 Ligue 2 win over Troyes on 16 August 2024.

== International career ==
Godame was called up to the Central African Republic national team for the 2024 FIFA Series, where he was tied for top scorer with 3 goals.

== Playing style ==
Godame plays as a forward although in his first season for Challans, he played as a right winger, and in his second played on the right, left, and as a striker.

== Career statistics ==
=== International ===
As of match played 10 September 2024

Appearances and goals by national team and year
National team	Year	Apps	Goals
Central African Republic	2024	6	3
Central African Republic	2025	0	0
Total		6	3

Scores and results list Central African Republic's goal tally first, score column indicates score after each Godame goal.

List of international goals scored by Tieri Godame
No.	Date	Venue	Opponent	Score	Result	Competition	Ref.
1	25 March 2024	Colombo Racecourse, Colombo, Sri Lanka	Papua New Guinea	2–0	4–0	2024 FIFA Series	
2	25 March 2024	Colombo Racecourse, Colombo, Sri Lanka	Papua New Guinea	3–0	4–0	2024 FIFA Series	
3	25 March 2024	Colombo Racecourse, Colombo, Sri Lanka	Papua New Guinea	4–0	4–0	2024 FIFA Series	
