= Josias Sabone =

Central African Republic footballer

Personal information
- Full name: Josias Sabone Komesse
- Date of birth: 28 August 2006 (age 20)
- Place of birth: Reims, France
- Height: 1.89 m (6 ft 2 in)
- Position: Midfielder

Team information
- Current team: Torino U20
- Number: 10

Youth career
- Stade de Reims
- 2024–: Torino

International career^{‡}
Years	Team	Apps	(Gls)
2026–	Central African Republic	1	(0)
- ‡ National team caps and goals as of 7 June 2026

Josias Sabone Komesse (born 28 August 2006 in Reims) is a footballer who plays as a midfielder for Torino Primavera in the Campionato Primavera 1. Born in France, he plays for the Central African Republic national team.

== Club career ==
Sabone developed through the youth academy of Stade de Reims before joining Torino FC on a permanent transfer in August 2024, where he was integrated into the Primavera squad under coach Felice Tufano. He made 13 appearances in the Campionato Primavera 1 in his debut 2024–25 season and was confirmed in the squad for the 2025–26 season. He made a further Primavera 13 appearances in 2025–26, with his contract at Torino expiring at the end of June 2026.

== International career ==
Born in France, Sabone is of Central African descent and holds dual citizenship. He was called up to the Central African Republic national team for a set of friendlies in June 2026. He made his senior debut on 5 June 2026, coming on as a substitute at the 71st minute — replacing Joël Ngoya — in the 1–1 international friendly draw against Togo at the Stade El Bachir in Mohammédia, Morocco. The match saw the Central African Republic open the scoring through Goduine Koyalipou before Togo equalised through Karim.
