= Blaise Kopogo =

Central African football manager

Personal information
- Date of birth: 1972 (age 53–54)

Managerial career
- Years: Team
- 2015: Central African Republic
- 2019: Football club de Saint-Médard-en-Jalles

Blaise Kopogo (born 1972) is a football manager who is last known to have managed Football club de Saint-Médard-en-Jalles.

== Career ==
In 2015, Kopogo was appointed manager of Central African Republic after Central African Republic expatriate players asked for a Central African Republic expatriate manager, using him as their candidate. In 2019. he was appointed manager of French sixth division club Football club de Saint-Médard-en-Jalles.
