= Stade Poitevin FC =

French football club, based in Poitiers

- Full name: Stade Poitevin Football Club
- Founded: 1921; 105 years ago
- Ground: Stade Michel-Amand
- Capacity: 15,750
- President: Jean-Pierre Giret
- Head coach: Xavier Dudoit
- League: National 3 Group C
- 2022–23: National 3 Group A, 9th
- Website: https://stade-poitevin-fc.footeo.com
Home colours	Away colours

Stade Poitevin FC is a French football team based in the city of Poitiers, which was established in 1921. It was known as Poitiers FC between 2007 and 2018, and had a number of other names in its history. The club (as Stade Poitevin PEPP) spent the 1995–96 season in Ligue 2.

As of the 2019–20 season, the club play in Championnat National 3, the fifth level of French football, and are managed by Erwan Lannuzel.

== History ==
The club was formed in 1921 as Sporting Club Poitevin, and joined the Division d'Honneur of the Ligue du Centre-Ouest in 1936. In 1952 the club lost its place in the league, and in order to regain it, merged with another local club Patronage des Écoles Publiques de Poitiers, becoming known as Stade Poitevin PEPP. The new club were champions of the DH Centre-Ouest in 1963, and gained promotion to the top level of amateur football, known as the Championnat de France Amateur.

The club was invited to the new "open" Division 2 in 1970. They were relegated to Division 3 in 1974 and Division 4 in 1988. Under the management of Denis Devaux the club achieved two successive promotions and played in the professional Division 2 for one season in 1995–96. Successive relegations followed, and the club played in Championnat de France Amateur 2 between 1999 and 2003. They were promoted again during the 2003–04 season, but suffered financial problems and were administratively relegate back to the Division d'Honneur.

The club relaunched under a new identity of Poitiers Foot 86 and in 2007 merged with rival club Cercle Education Physique Poitiers, taking the name Poitiers Football Club. With this identity the club won promotion to CFA2 in 2009. They were relegated again to Division d'Honneur at the end of the 2013–14 season.

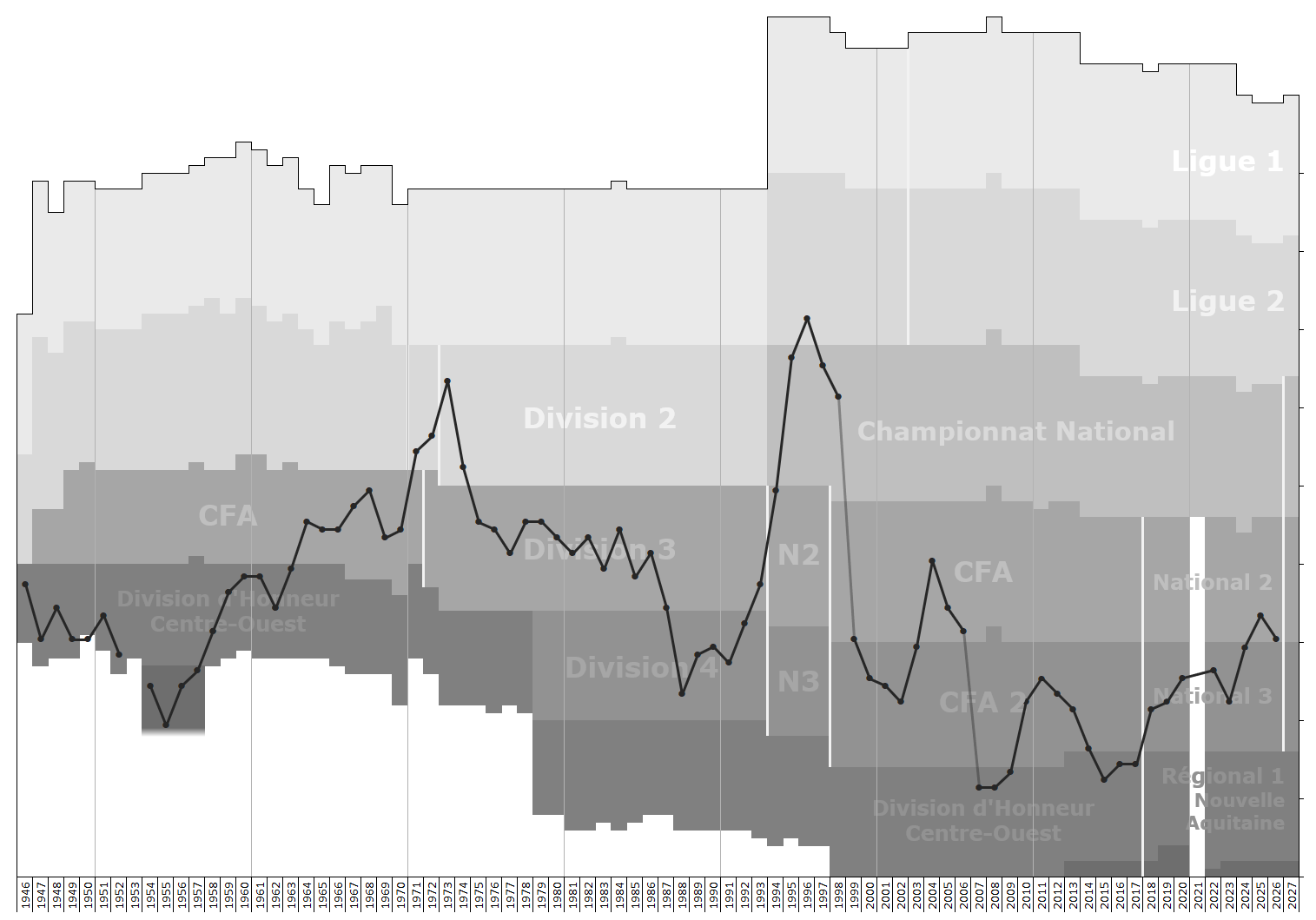
Historical league performance chart of Stade Poitevin FC

In February 2016 the club announced a plan to return to their old Stade Poitevin FC name, and colours of black and white. The change was finally completed in the summer of 2018, after the club had gained promotion to Championnat National 3.

== Players ==
As of 10 April, 2026.

Note: Flags indicate national team as defined under FIFA eligibility rules; some limited exceptions apply. Players may hold more than one non-FIFA nationality.

No.	Pos.	Nation	Player
1	GK	FRA	Théo Louis
3	DF	FRA	Alexandre Durimel
4	DF	CTA	Sacha M'Baka
5	MF	FRA	Brian Meriguet
6	MF	FRA	Diaguely Dabo
7	MF	FRA	Benoît Cachenaut
8	MF	FRA	Lucas Franco
9	FW	SEN	Olivier Boissy
10	FW	CMR	Johane Mbati Kaine
11	FW	FRA	Wilfried Baana Jaba
12	FW	FRA	Mamadou Diakhaby
14	DF	FRA	Cédric Jean-Etienne (captain)

No.	Pos.	Nation	Player
15	MF	GUI	Ismaël Camara
17	MF	FRA	Romain Caumet
18	DF	FRA	Ben Soilihi Aboubacar
19	DF	GUI	Florentin Pogba
20	MF	CIV	Youssouf Diarra
23	DF	FRA	Angel Marchegay
24	MF	FRA	Yvan Kibundu
25	FW	FRA	Clément Grégoire
27	FW	GUF	Ansley Panelle
28	MF	FRA	Ludovic Faucher
29	DF	FRA	Laïd Bokhari
30	GK	FRA	Léandre Delboulle

== Notable players ==
- (France) Lorenz Assignon (youth)

== Managers ==
- (France) Lionel Charbonnier (2002–2004)
- (France) Laurent Croci (2004–2005)
