= Raoul Savoy =

Swiss football manager

Personal information
- Date of birth: 18 May 1973 (age 53)
- Place of birth: Sainte-Croix, Switzerland

Team information
- Current team: Chad (manager)

Managerial career
- Years: Team
- 2002–2003: Tonnerre Yaoundé
- 2003–2005: COD Meknes
- 2005–2006: SCC Mohammédia
- 2006: IR Tanger
- 2006–2007: Ethiopia
- 2007–2008: Swaziland
- 2009–2011: MC Oujda
- 2012: MC Oran
- 2013: MC El Eulma
- 2013: FC Sion II
- 2014–2015: Central African Republic
- 2015: Gambia
- 2017–2019: Central African Republic
- 2021–2024: Central African Republic
- 2025–: Chad

Raoul Savoy (born 18 May 1973) is a Swiss football coach who is the manager of the Chad national team.

== Career ==
In 2012, he spent for the first time in Algeria managing MC Oran and in 2013 MC El Eulma.

On 15 May 2015, Raoul was appointed the manager of Gambia national football team. He quit in December 2015.

In February 2017, he was one of a number of managers on the shortlist for the vacant Rwanda national team manager role. He later became manager of Central African Republic staying until March 2019. In August 2021, he was reappointed as head coach of Central African Republic for a third stint.

On 24 October 2024, the Central African Ministry of Sport sacked Savoy as the Central African Republic national team manager. In return, he demanded the government to pay his unpaid salaries of 160,000 euros.

In August 2025, Savoy was appointed as manager of Chad.

== Personal life ==
Born in Switzerland, Savoy is of Spanish descent.
