= Joël Ngoya =

Central African Republic footballer

Personal information
- Full name: Joël Jordan Ngoya
- Date of birth: 3 January 2002 (age 24)
- Place of birth: Montreuil, France
- Height: 1.88 m (6 ft 2 in)
- Position: Midfielder

Team information
- Current team: Valenciennes II

Youth career
- Laval

Senior career*
Years	Team	Apps	(Gls)
2019–2020	Lille II	1	(0)
2020–2023	Atlético Madrileño	0	(0)
2022	→Red Star (loan)	3	(0)
2022–2023	→ Formentera (loan)	15	(0)
2025–	Valenciennes II	8	(0)

International career^{‡}
2026–	Central African Republic	1	(0)
- * Club domestic league appearances and goals as of 23:15, 7 June 2026 (UTC) ‡ National team caps and goals as of 23:15, 7 June 2026 (UTC)

Joël Jordan Ngoya (born 3 January 2002 in Montreuil) is a footballer who plays as a central midfielder for Valenciennes FC B in the Championnat National 3. Born in France, he plays for the Central African Republic national team.

== Club career ==
Originally from Noisy-le-Sec in Seine-Saint-Denis, Ngoya began his development at Stade Lavallois before joining the LOSC Lille academy, where he progressed through the youth ranks and featured in three UEFA Youth League matches during the 2019–20 campaign, including a qualification round victory over Midtjylland.

In 2020, at the age of eighteen, Ngoya joined Atlético Madrid, training regularly with the first team. In January 2022 he joined Red Star FC on loan in the Championnat National. He subsequently went on loan to SD Formentera in Spain's Segunda Federación in September 2022 before returning to Atlético Madrid.

In December 2025, Ngoya joined Valenciennes FC B in the Championnat National 3.

== International career ==
Born in France, Ngoya is of Central African and Congolese descent. He was called up to the Central African Republic national team for the June 2026 FIFA window and made his debut on 5 June 2026, appearing in the 1–1 international friendly draw against Togo at the Stade El Bachir in Mohammédia, Morocco.
