= Sami Wattel =

Central African footballer

Personal information
- Full name: Sami Wattel Bello
- Date of birth: 15 January 2006 (age 20)
- Place of birth: Besançon, France
- Height: 1.80 m (5 ft 11 in)
- Position: Midfielder

Team information
- Current team: Nice II

Youth career
- 2012–2017: AS Frontignan AC
- 2017–2020: Cavigal Nice Sports
- 2020–2022: Nice

Senior career*
Years	Team	Apps	(Gls)
2022–	Nice II	8	(0)

International career^{‡}
2021	France U16	2	(1)
2022–2023	France U17	3	(0)
2026–	Central African Republic	1	(0)
- * Club domestic league appearances and goals as of 21:55, 7 June 2026 (UTC) ‡ National team caps and goals as of 21:55, 7 June 2026 (UTC)

Sami Wattel Bello (born 15 January 2006 in Besançon) is a footballer who plays as a midfielder for Nice II in the Championnat National 3. Born in France, he plays for the Central African Republic national team.

== Club career ==
Born in Besançon, Wattel is a product of the youth academies of the French clubs AS Frontignan AC, Cavigal Nice Sports and OGC Nice. He progressed through Nice's youth before being promoted to their reserves side ahead of the 2025–26 season.

== International career ==
Wattel was born in France and is of Central African descent. He was called up to the France U17s in September 2022. He received his first senior call-up to the Central African Republic national team for the June 2026 FIFA window, named in the squad by head coach Eloge Enza Yamissi for a friendly against Togo. He made his senior debut on 5 June 2026, appearing in the 1–1 friendly draw against Togo at the Stade El Bachir in Mohammédia, Morocco, a match in which the Central African Republic opened the scoring through Goduine Koyalipou before Togo equalised via Kevin Denkey.
