= 2021–22 Coupe de France preliminary rounds, Nouvelle-Aquitaine =

The 2021–22 Coupe de France preliminary rounds, Nouvelle-Aquitaine was the qualifying competition to decide which teams from the leagues of the Nouvelle-Aquitaine region of France took part in the main competition from the seventh round.

A total of thirteen teams qualified from the Nouvelle-Aquitaine preliminary rounds. In 2020–21, US Lège Cap Ferret and Stade Poitevin FC progressed furthest in the main competition, reaching the round of 64 before losing to Aubagne FC and AS Monaco respectively.

== Draws and fixtures ==
On 13 July 2021, the league announced that a total of 689 teams had entered from the region. The first round would consist of 296 ties, featuring all teams from Régional 3 and below, plus 25 teams from Régional 2. The 45 exempted teams from Régional 2 and all 36 teams from Régional 1 entered at the second round stage. The 12 Championnat National 3 teams entered at the third round stage and the 4 Championnat National 2 teams entered at the fourth round stage.

=== First round ===
These matches were played on 27, 28 and 29 August 2021.

First round results: Nouvelle Aquitaine
| Tie no | Home team (tier) | Score | Away team (tier) |
|---|---|---|---|
| 1. | JS Chapelloise (11) | 0–4 | Montpon-Ménesplet FC (8) |
| 2. | ES Ligniac (11) | 0–3 | Limoges Landouge (7) |
| 3. | FC Smarves Iteuil (9) | 3–0 | Buslaurs Thireuil (10) |
| 4. | FC Loudun (10) | 2–3 | Espérance Availles-en-Châtellerault (10) |
| 5. | Antran SL (8) | 1–1 (7–6 p) | FC Vrines (9) |
| 6. | Gati-Foot (10) | 5–0 | US Jaunay-Clan (10) |
| 7. | CO Cerizay (8) | 1–1 (4–2 p) | US Envigne (9) |
| 8. | SL Cenon-sur-Vienne (11) | 0–3 (Note: Tie won by means of forfeit.) | ES Louzy (10) |
| 9. | AS Périgné (12) | 1–0 | US Aulnay (9) |
| 10. | La Jarrie FC (10) | 2–0 | CS Beauvoir-sur-Niort (10) |
| 11. | Saint-Porchaire-Corme Royal FC (10) | 0–3 | Rochefort FC (7) |
| 12. | Us Vouillé 86 (8) | 4–1 | US Frontenay-Saint-Symphorien (9) |
| 13. | US Marennaise (8) | 3–0 | AS Aigre (9) |
| 14. | UAS Verdille (9) | 1–1 (5–4 p) | Avenir Matha (7) |
| 15. | Val de Boutonne Foot 79 (10) | 2–4 | Oléron FC (8) |
| 16. | AS Maritime (8) | 0–2 | EFC DB2S (8) |
| 17. | US Pont l'Abbé d'Arnoult (11) | 0–6 | ES Celles-Verrines (8) |
| 18. | Canton Aunis FC (10) | 3–3 (3–4 p) | CS Venise Verte (11) |
| 19. | FC Saint-Rogatien (10) | 4–1 | FC Saint-Fraigne (11) |
| 20. | FC Saint-Amant-de-Boixe (11) | 0–5 | US Pays Maixentais (8) |
| 21. | AS Cabariot (8) | 0–0 (3–0 p) | AS Aiffres (7) |
| 22. | US La Crèche (10) | 3–1 | AS Saint-Christophe 17 (10) |
| 23. | AS Valdivienne (10) | 2–1 | FC Rouillé (9) |
| 24. | Avenir Nord Foot 87 (10) | 5–2 | US Vivonne (11) |
| 25. | FC Confolentais (9) | 0–0 (6–7 p) | US Chasseneuil (10) |
| 26. | US Anais (11) | 1–7 | Tardoire FC La Roche/Rivières (8) |
| 27. | US Le Dorat (10) | 0–6 | FC Usson-Isle (9) |
| 28. | Entente Saint-Maurice-Gençay (14) | 3–4 | FC Fleuré (9) |
| 29. | Entente Nanteuil-Verteuil (12) | 0–1 | SC Verrières (9) |
| 30. | AS Civaux (11) | 1–2 | ASFC Vindelle (8) |
| 31. | AS Saint-Yrieix (9) | 3–1 | ES Château-Larcher (9) |
| 32. | Fontafie FC (11) | 8–1 | Espérance Saint-Bonnet-de-Bellac (11) |
| 33. | ES Montignac 16 (11) | 0–2 | OC Sommières Saint-Romain (11) |
| 34. | FC Chaillac Saillat (12) | 0–2 | Rochechouart OC (11) |
| 35. | ASPTT Limoges (11) | 0–1 | AS Lussac-les-Églises (11) |
| 36. | US Oradour-sur-Glane (11) | 1–4 | FC des 2 Vallées (9) |
| 37. | ES Ussel (9) | 2–2 (7–8 p) | CS Boussac (8) |
| 38. | US Donzenac (7) | 1–1 (5–4 p) | FC Sarlat-Marcillac (8) |
| 39. | FC Pays Arédien (11) | 1–1 (2–3 p) | CA Chamboulive (9) |
| 40. | CS Allassac (9) | 1–4 | FC Argentat (8) |
| 41. | ES Nonards (8) | 3–1 | Entente Perpezac Sadroc (9) |
| 42. | USA Saint-Aigulin (10) | 2–4 | AS Puymoyen (8) |
| 43. | ES Mornac (10) | 6–3 | JS Abzac (11) |
| 44. | AJ Montmoreau (10) | 3–1 | AS Neuvic-Saint-Léon (10) |
| 45. | JS Basseau Angoulême (9) | 3–6 | FC Pays de Mareuil (8) |
| 46. | AS Soyaux (8) | 2–3 | US Chancelade/Marsac (9) |
| 47. | Union Saint-Médard Petit-Palais (10) | 4–0 | Tour Sportive et Merles Blancs 88 (10) |
| 48. | Périgueux Foot (10) | 4–3 | US Artiguaise (11) |
| 49. | USA Montbronn (10) | 2–0 | US Annesse-et-Beaulieu (10) |
| 50. | AS Bel-Air (11) | 3–1 | JS Garat-Sers-Vouzan (11) |
| 51. | AS Chazelles (11) | 0–0 (2–4 p) | OFC Ruelle (8) |
| 52. | SL Châteaubernard (11) | 0–3 | SC Cadaujac (8) |
| 53. | SJ Artigues (12) | 0–3 | Alliance Foot 3B (8) |
| 54. | SC Mouthiers (9) | 7–1 | US Nord Gironde (10) |
| 55. | US Châteauneuf 16 (10) | 0–3 | AS Merpins (7) |
| 56. | ES Thénacaise (11) | 0–3 | RC Bordeaux Métropole (8) |
| 57. | US La Gémoze (10) | 1–1 (8–7 p) | USJ Saint-Augustin Club Pyrénées Aquitaine (10) |
| 58. | ALFC Fontcouverte (10) | 3–3 (4–3 p) | FC Côteaux Bordelais (8) |
| 59. | CS Saint-Michel-sur-Charente (9) | 1–0 | US Saujon (9) |
| 60. | FC Casteljaloux (10) | 3–0 | CA Castets-en-Dorthe (11) |
| 61. | ASSA Pays du Dropt (8) | 4–0 | AS Miramont-Lavergne (9) |
| 62. | FC Nérac en Albret (9) | 1–2 | Entente Boé Bon-Encontre (7) |
| 63. | AS Pays de Montaigne et Gurçon (9) | 2–2 (6–5 p) | VS Caudrot (9) |
| 64. | Football Sud Bastide (10) | 3–1 | FC Vallée de la Dordogne (11) |
| 65. | AS Côteaux Dordogne (10) | 1–7 | Confluent Football 47 (7) |
| 66. | FC Espagnol Pau (11) | 0–3 | Labenne OSC (8) |
| 67. | FC Lacajunte-Tursan (9) | 2–2 (4–2 p) | FC Gan (10) |
| 68. | Bleuets Pau (8) | 3–4 | FC Saint-Vincent-de-Paul (9) |
| 69. | SC Arthez Lacq Audejos (8) | 3–0 | AS Mourenx-Bourg (9) |
| 70. | US Armagnac (11) | 2–4 | FC Parentis (9) |
| 71. | FC La Ribère (8) | 2–1 | US Garein (9) |
| 72. | ES Montoise (8) | 1–4 | AS Facture-Biganos Boïens (8) |
| 73. | Violette Aturine (8) | 2–0 | AS des Églantines de Hendaye (9) |
| 74. | Biscarrosse OFC (8) | 0–2 | FC Belin-Béliet (8) |
| 75. | FC Oloronais (9) | 2–0 | US Saint-Palais Amikuze (9) |
| 76. | Fraternelle Landiras (10) | 0–5 | FC Saint-Martin-de-Seignanx (8) |
| 77. | Patronage Bazadais (8) | 1–2 | FC Luy de Béarn (8) |
| 78. | FC Pays Argentonnais (9) | 6–0 | Union Cernay-Saint-Genest (10) |
| 79. | ES Saint-Amand-sur-Sèvre (11) | 3–1 | Entente Voulmentin-Saint-Aubin-du-Plain-La Coudre (11) |
| 80. | CL Noirlieu-Chambroutet Bressuire (11) | 0–3 | US Thuré-Besse (10) |
| 81. | SC L'Absie-Largeasse/Moutiers-sous-Chantmerle (11) | 1–4 | ES Aubinrorthais (8) |
| 82. | SC Vouzailles (13) | 1–2 | US Leignes-sur-Fontaine (10) |
| 83. | FC Vouneuil-sous-Biard-Béruges (10) | 2–1 | Amicale Coussay-les-Bois (11) |
| 84. | FC ASM (11) | 0–3 | ES Oyré-Dangé (9) |
| 85. | US Cissé (12) | 0–10 | ES Nouaillé (8) |
| 86. | Bel-Air Rocs OC Poitiers (11) | 0–3 | US Vicq-sur-Gartempe (8) |
| 87. | FC Plaine Gâtine (12) | 2–3 | FC Comores Bressuire (11) |
| 88. | US Vergentonnaise (12) | 0–7 | Inter Bocage FC (9) |
| 89. | US Champdeniers-Pamplie (11) | 3–2 | FC Clazay Bocage (11) |
| 90. | Croutelle FC (12) | 1–1 (4–5 p) | US Vouillé (11) |
| 91. | ASC Portugais Parthenay et de Gâtine (11) | 0–10 | FC Jardres (12) |
| 92. | FC Chiché (11) | 3–2 | ACS Mahorais 79 (10) |
| 93. | ASA Couronneries (11) | 0–0 (3–5 p) | AS Portugais Châtellerault (8) |
| 94. | ES Pays Thénezéen (10) | 5–0 | US Brion 79 (11) |
| 95. | AS Saint-Christophe 86 (12) | 0–3 | JS Nieuil l'Espoir (8) |
| 96. | ES Boismé Clessé (12) | 1–1 (9–8 p) | FC Châtillon (12) |
| 97. | AS Sèvres-Anxaumont (10) | 0–3 | FC Saint-Jean-Missé (11) |
| 98. | FC Sud Gâtine (10) | 4–0 | AAS Saint-Julien-l'Ars (10) |
| 99. | AS Poitiers Gibauderie Mahorais (11) | 7–1 | SA Mauzé-Rigné (11) |
| 100. | AS Saint-Léger Montbrillais (11) | 1–3 | EF Le Tallud (7) |
| 101. | AS Saint-Loup Louin (13) | 1–4 | AS Portugais Cerizay (10) |
| 102. | FC Chanteloup-Courlay-Chapelle (10) | 4–1 | Boivre SC (10) |
| 103. | ES Fayenoirterre (11) | 1–1 (4–3 p) | US Mirebeau (11) |
| 104. | CEP Poitiers (11) | 1–2 | Avenir Autize (11) |
| 105. | FC Montamisé (10) | 3–1 | US Saint-Varent Pierregeay (8) |
| 106. | Pleumartin-La Roche-Posay FC (12) | 0–5 | ES Trois Cités Poitiers (9) |
| 107. | AS Colombiers (13) | 2–2 (4–5 p) | US Vasléenne (9) |
| 108. | ES Saint-Cerbouillé (8) | 1–2 | FC Fontaine-le-Comte (8) |
| 109. | US Avanton (10) | 2–1 | ES Beaulieu-Breuil (10) |
| 110. | FC Pays de l'Ouin (8) | 4–1 | Ozon FC (9) |
| 111. | Biard FC (11) | 2–2 (2–4 p) | Chasseneuil-Saint-Georges FC (9) |
| 112. | AS Coulonges-Thouarsais (11) | 2–5 | FC Airvo Saint-Jouin (9) |
| 113. | US Vrère-Saint-Léger-de-Montbrun (10) | 0–3 | US Saint-Sauveur (7) |
| 114. | AS Sainte-Ouenne (13) | 1–1 (5–6 p) | Espérance Terves (8) |
| 115. | CA Saint-Aubin-le-Cloud (9) | 4–1 | US Nord Vienne (10) |
| 116. | ES La Pallu (11) | 1–2 | ES Saint-Benoit (8) |
| 117. | ASPTT Bessines (12) | 2–5 | ES Ardin (9) |
| 118. | US Mauzé-sur-le-Mignon (10) | 4–0 | JS Angoulins (11) |
| 119. | US Lezay (10) | 3–1 | AS Vérines (11) |
| 120. | AS Andilly (10) | 1–1 (2–4 p) | ES Brûlain (10) |
| 121. | Amicale Saint-Martin (12) | 0–0 (0–3 p) | FC Rouillac (11) |
| 122. | FC de la Soie (11) | 1–5 | AS Pays Mellois (8) |
| 123. | Espoir Haut Vals de Saintonge (11) | 1–9 | Aunis AFC (9) |
| 124. | ES Clussais (11) | 2–2 (5–4 p) | FC Canton de Courçon (11) |
| 125. | ES Tonnacquoise-Lussantaise (10) | 3–3 (5–4 p) | DR Boucholeurs-Châtelaillon-Yves (10) |
| 126. | AR Cherveux (12) | 2–0 | FC Haut Val de Sèvre (10) |
| 127. | AS Sainte-Néomays Romans (12) | 0–1 | Capaunis ASPTT FC (8) |
| 128. | AS Argenteuil Angerien Poursay-Garnaud (10) | 0–3 | AAAM Laleu-La Pallice (8) |
| 129. | ASS Portugais La Rochelle (11) | 3–0 | ES Saint-Just-Luzac (9) |
| 130. | 'ACS La Rochelle (10) | 2–1 | AS Saint-Martin-lès-Melle (11) |
| 131. | Avenir 79 FC (9) | 3–0 | Entente Soubise Port-des-Barques (10) |
| 132. | ES Muron Genouillé (12) | 0–2 | US Aigrefeuille (9) |
| 133. | AS Exoudun (12) | 2–3 | Breuil-Magné FC (11) |
| 134. | US Prahecq (12) | 0–6 | AS Réthaise (7) |
| 135. | Stade Boisseuillais (12) | 2–4 | ESAB 96 FC (10) |
| 136. | ES Mougon (11) | 0–3 | Stade Vouillé (8) |
| 137. | AS Augé/Azay-le-Brûlé (11) | 0–0 (1–3 p) | Aviron Boutonnais (9) |
| 138. | US Pexinoise Niort (12) | 1–7 | FC Essouvert Loulay (10) |
| 139. | SEPC Exireuil (11) | 0–4 | FC Boutonnais (10) |
| 140. | AS Blanzay (13) | 0–4 | CS Saint-Angeau (10) |
| 141. | Coqs Rouges Mansle (10) | 1–7 | AS Brie (9) |
| 142. | SC Champagné-Saint-Hilaire (12) | 2–10 | ES Brion-Saint-Secondin (10) |
| 143. | US Lessac (10) | 2–3 | ES Champniers (8) |
| 144. | US Availles-Limouzine (14) | 2–8 | Entente Foot 16 (11) |
| 145. | Taizé-Aizie Les Adjots (12) | 0–4 | Avenir Bellac-Berneuil-Saint-Junien-les-Combes (8) |
| 146. | AS Vars (12) | 1–7 | US Leigné-sur-Usseau (11) |
| 147. | US Abzac (11) | 3–1 | AS Payroux Charroux Mauprévoir (11) |
| 148. | CS Chatain (12) | 0–2 | US Mélusine (9) |
| 149. | FC Vallée du Salleron (13) | 1–3 | Valence-en-Poitou OC (10) |
| 150. | SC Agris (13) | 2–1 | ES Nouic Mézières (12) |
| 151. | AS Saint-Saviol (12) | 1–11 | ACG Foot Sud 86 (10) |
| 152. | AS La Jonchère-Saint-Maurice (11) | 0–12 | SA Le Palais-sur-Vienne (7) |
| 153. | US Saint-Fiel (9) | 1–2 | AS Châteauneuf-Neuvic (8) |
| 154. | Boisseuil FC (10) | 1–0 | US Nantiat (9) |
| 155. | ES Dun-Naillat (10) | 0–2 | Limoges Football (9) |
| 156. | USS Mérinchal (9) | 4–0 | US Vallière (10) |
| 157. | SC Verneuil-sur-Vienne (8) | 3–0 | US Felletin (8) |
| 158. | Diables Bleus Bersac (11) | 2–2 (4–1 p) | US Saint-Vaury (9) |
| 159. | FC Saint-Priest-sous-Aixe (10) | 1–1 (2–3 p) | US Saint-Léonard-de-Noblat (8) |
| 160. | AS Aiguille Bosmie Charroux (11) | 3–3 (4–2 p) | Football Cognacois Cyrien Laurentais (11) |
| 161. | AS Saint-Just-le-Martel (10) | 3–0 | CA Égletons (9) |
| 162. | AC Kurdes Limoges (10) | 2–0 | AS Limoges Roussillon (8) |
| 163. | AS Marcillac Clergoux (11) | 1–1 (3–2 p) | AS Saint-Louis Val de l'Aurence (10) |
| 164. | AS Eymoutiers (9) | 0–1 | AS Saint-Junien (8) |
| 165. | USC Bourganeuf (9) | 2–1 | CA Saint-Victurnien (10) |
| 166. | AS Reterre Fontanières (10) | 0–10 | EF Aubussonnais (8) |
| 167. | Vigenal FC Limoges (8) | 3–1 | JS Chambon-sur-Voueize (9) |
| 168. | ES Bénévent-Marsac (9) | 3–1 | RFC Sainte-Feyre (9) |
| 169. | Espoirs La Geneytouse (9) | 3–5 | FC Saint-Brice-sur-Vienne (10) |
| 170. | SC Séreilhac (11) | 1–0 | SC Sardent (9) |
| 171. | CA Peyrat-la-Nonière (9) | 6–1 | US Beaune-les-Mines (9) |
| 172. | ES Evaux-Budelière (10) | 4–6 | US Veyrac (10) |
| 173. | FC Canton d'Oradour-sur-Vayres (10) | 1–2 | US Bessines-Morterolles (8) |
| 174. | AS Saint-Sulpice-le-Guérétois (8) | 1–0 | US Auzances (9) |
| 175. | AS Ambazac (9) | 0–1 | CA Meymac (8) |
| 176. | FC Bassimilhacois (9) | 1–1 (3–1 p) | US Pays de Fénelon (10) |
| 177. | AS Saint-Viance (11) | 1–2 | FC Cornilois-Fortunadais (9) |
| 178. | USA Terrasson (11) | 1–5 | Auvézère Mayne FC (9) |
| 179. | Amicale Saint-Hilaire Venersal (10) | 2–2 (5–6 p) | FC Thenon-Limeyrat-Fossemagne (7) |
| 180. | FC Spartak Carsac (12) | 0–3 | ES Portugais Brive (10) |
| 181. | ASPO Brive (8) | 5–2 | AS Beynat (8) |
| 182. | FC Saint-Jal (11) | 0–6 | La Thibérienne (8) |
| 183. | Olympique Larche Lafeuillade (9) | 1–1 (2–3 p) | SS Sainte-Féréole (8) |
| 184. | Occitane FC (9) | 2–2 (5–3 p) | Varetz AC (9) |
| 185. | US La Roche l'Abeille (9) | 2–0 | Entente SR3V (9) |
| 186. | AS Nexon (9) | 4–1 | Condat FC (10) |
| 187. | CA Brignac (11) | 1–1 (2–3 p) | Foot Sud 87 (9) |
| 188. | Cosnac FC (10) | 2–2 (5–4 p) | FREP Saint-Germain (9) |
| 189. | APCS Mahorais Brive (11) | 2–0 | Entente des Barrages de la Xaintrie (9) |
| 190. | FC Objat (10) | 3–2 | US Saint-Clementoise (9) |
| 191. | US Lanteuil (9) | 4–1 | ES Ussac (9) |
| 192. | Campagnac Daglan Saint-Laurent Foot (12) | 0–3 | AS Jugeals-Noailles (9) |
| 193. | AS Collonges Chauffour (11) | 0–12 | ASV Malemort (9) |
| 194. | FC Cublac (12) | 3–0 | AS Seilhac (10) |
| 195. | AC Gond-Pontouvre (12) | 1–2 | FC Charentais L'Isle-d'Espagnac (10) |
| 196. | Les Aiglons Razacois (10) | 0–4 | SA Sanilhacois (9) |
| 197. | Entente Grignols Villamblard (11) | 0–6 | AS Nontron-Saint-Pardoux (7) |
| 198. | FC Atur (11) | 0–3 | AC Sud Saintonge (9) |
| 199. | US Coutras (11) | 1–1 (3–4 p) | CA Ribéracois (8) |
| 200. | Saint-Seurin JC (12) | 3–0 | Gué-de-Sénac FC (10) |
| 201. | FC Saint-Antoine (12) | 1–3 | Entente Saint-Séverin/Palluaud (10) |
| 202. | Étoile La Roche-Chalais (11) | 0–2 | CS Leroy Angoulême (7) |
| 203. | La Patriote Agonac (10) | 0–8 | Limens JSA (8) |
| 204. | US Marsaneix Manoire (11) | 3–1 | GSF Portugais Angoulême (9) |
| 205. | AS Laurentine (11) | 3–6 | JS Saint-Christophe-de-Double (11) |
| 206. | AS Coursac (11) | 1–3 | CO Coulouniex-Chamiers (9) |
| 207. | US Tocane-Saint-Apre (10) | 1–0 | AS Saint-Germain-Chantérac (11) |
| 208. | US Ma Campagne Angoulême (10) | 6–1 | US Saint-Denis-de-Pile (10) |
| 209. | AG Vendays-Montalivet (11) | 2–1 | AS Chambéry (11) |
| 210. | USC Léognan (10) | 1–2 | Saint-Palais SF (8) |
| 211. | FC Roullet-Saint-Estèphe (8) | 0–2 | FC Pessac Alouette (7) |
| 212. | RC Chambéry (10) | 0–0(2–4 p) | FC Sévigné Jonzac-Saint-Germain (8) |
| 213. | AS Saint-Aubin-de-Médoc (10) | 1–5 | ES Eysinaise (9) |
| 214. | FC Pierroton Cestas Toctoucau (11) | 3–4 | Parempuyre FC (11) |
| 215. | AGJA Caudéran (10) | 1–1 (7–8 p) | FC Cœur Médoc Atlantique (7) |
| 216. | JS Bersonnaise (12) | 0–7 | US Pons (10) |
| 217. | Stade Blayais (11) | 4–0 | ES Fronsadaise (9) |
| 218. | CA Carignanais (11) | 1–0 | FCA Moron (8) |
| 219. | FC Cubzac-les-Ponts (11) | 3–6 | FC Seudre Ocean (10) |
| 220. | AS Montferrand (10) | 1–5 | SJ Macaudaise (9) |
| 221. | Bouliacaise FC (11) | 3–3 (4–5 p) | FC Portes d'Océan 17 (9) |
| 222. | SC Bastidienne (9) | 1–1 (4–3 p) | AL Saint-Brice (10) |
| 223. | JS Semussac (10) | 7–0 | US Cercoux Clottaise (11) |
| 224. | ES Bruges (10) | 3–0 | Nersac FC (10) |
| 225. | ES Linars (9) | 0–0 (4–1 p) | Montesquieu FC (8) |
| 226. | Stade Pessacais UC (10) | 1–2 | FC Arsac-Pian Médoc (8) |
| 227. | APIS en Aquitaine (12) | 2–6 | FC Gradignan (10) |
| 228. | FC Sud 17 (9) | 3–0 | CM Floirac (10) |
| 229. | Athletic 89 FC (10) | 1–2 | CMO Bassens (9) |
| 230. | Union Pauillac Saint-Laurent (9) | 1–1 (3–5 p) | FC Saint André-de-Cubzac (7) |
| 231. | US Ludon (11) | 0–7 | FC Martignas-Illac (8) |
| 232. | Saint-Seurin Saint-Estèphe FC (11) | 3–2 (Note: Tie reversed from original draw.) | FC Ambès (11) |
| 233. | SC Bédenac Laruscade (12) | 0–4 | CO La Couronne (8) |
| 234. | FC Cubnezais (11) | 2–4 | FC Loubesien (9) |
| 235. | ES Fléac (11) | 0–7 | AS Le Taillan (8) |
| 236. | CS Portugais Villenave-d'Ornon (9) | 5–0 | FC Médoc Océan (8) |
| 237. | AS Mosnac (12) | 0–7 | ES Ambares (8) |
| 238. | US Cenon Rive Droite (8) | 4–0 | Sporting Chantecler Bordeaux Nord le Lac (8) |
| 239. | Union Saint-Jean (11) | 4–1 | AS Avensan-Moulis-Listrac (11) |
| 240. | ES Canéjan (10) | 1–2 | Bordeaux Étudiants CF (10) |
| 241. | Targon-Soulignac FC (9) | 2–0 | UFC Saint-Colomb-de-Lauzun (9) |
| 242. | AS Laugnac (11) | 1–2 | FC Gironde La Réole (9) |
| 243. | ES Mazères-Roaillan (11) | 0–0 (2–3 p) | US Allemans-du-Dropt (11) |
| 244. | FC Belvès (11) | 0–4 | Langon FC (7) |
| 245. | AS Morizes (11) | 0–5 | AS Castillonnès Cahuzac Lalande (8) |
| 246. | FC Côteaux Pécharmant (9) | 1–0 | FC Limeuil (9) |
| 247. | US Lamothe-Mongauzy (10) | 1–5 | FC Côteaux Libournais (8) |
| 248. | Roquentin OC (11) | 0–3 | Mas AC (9) |
| 249. | US Villeréal (12) | 2–3 | SC Astaffortais (11) |
| 250. | FCC Créonnais (10) | 2–2 (5–6 p) | AS Gensac-Montcaret (8) |
| 251. | FCO Eymetoise (11) | 0–3 | US Bazeillaise (11) |
| 252. | AS Beautiran FC (12) | 1–1 (4–2 p) | AS Sauveterrienne (11) |
| 253. | Athlético Vernois (10) | 1–1 (6–5 p) | Prigonrieux FC (7) |
| 254. | US Virazeil-Puymiclan (9) | 4–1 | FC Pays Beaumontois (9) |
| 255. | FC Faux (9) | 6–1 | FC Penne Saint-Sylvestre (10) |
| 256. | Saint-Sulpice Jeunesse (11) | 0–7 | FC Porte d'Aquitaine 47 (9) |
| 257. | Bleuets Macariens (11) | 1–8 | AS Marcellus-Cocumont (9) |
| 258. | US Port Sainte-Marie Feugarolles (10) | 5–2 | US Gontaud (9) |
| 259. | SJ Bergerac (11) | 2–1 | Pays de l'Eyraud (10) |
| 260. | AF Casseneuil-Pailloles-Lédat (8) | 2–3 | FC Périgord Centre (8) |
| 261. | FC Pineuilh (11) | 1–8 | FC Pays Aurossais (8) |
| 262. | FC Clairacais (11) | 0–9 | SC Monségur (11) |
| 263. | FLR Le Monteil (11) | 5–1 | Les Rouges de Saint-Jean Libourne (11) |
| 264. | US Farguais (11) | 0–2 | SU Agen (8) |
| 265. | AS Tarnos (8) | 2–2 (4–5 p) | ES Nay-Vath-Vielha (9) |
| 266. | CA Sallois (9) | 3–0 | AS Cazères (10) |
| 267. | RC Dax (11) | 1–1 (5–4 p) | FC Born (9) |
| 268. | FC Artiguelouve-Arbus-Aubertin (10) | 1–1 (5–4 p) | Union Jurançonnaise (8) |
| 269. | Papillons de Pontacq (10) | 0–1 | ES Pyrénéenne (10) |
| 270. | US Illats (10) | 1–5 | AS Pontonx (8) |
| 271. | Avenir Mourenxois (10) | 6–0 | USV Gelosienne (8) |
| 272. | Baiona FC (10) | 2–1 | FA Bourbaki Pau (9) |
| 273. | Étoile Béarnaise FC (10) | 2–3 | Carresse Salies FC (10) |
| 274. | Peyrehorade SF (10) | 1–4 | CS Lantonnais (8) |
| 275. | SC Saint-Symphorien (10) | 1–4 | Andernos Sport FC (7) |
| 276. | Sud Gironde FC (10) | 1–0 | FC Barpais (9) |
| 277. | JS Laluque-Rion (9) | 0–2 | ES Meillon-Assat-Narcastet (8) |
| 278. | Ardanavy FC (11) | 2–2 (4–3 p) | Chalosse FC (10) |
| 279. | Cazaux Olympique (9) | 5–2 | SA Saint-Séverin (8) |
| 280. | US Castétis-Gouze (9) | 5–3 | Marensin FC (10) |
| 281. | FC Hagetmautien (8) | 2–4 | JA Biarritz (7) |
| 282. | FC Vallée de l'Ousse (9) | 1–6 | Association Saint-Laurent Billère (9) |
| 283. | Monein FC (11) | 1–3 | FC Roquefort Saint-Justin (9) |
| 284. | Jeanne d'Arc Le Béarn Pau (10) | 0–1 | Pardies Olympique (8) |
| 285. | Saint-Perdon Sports (9) | 0–3 | Stade Ygossais (7) |
| 286. | FC des Enclaves et du Plateau (10) | 1–1 (3–4 p) | AS Artix (8) |
| 287. | ES Latrille-Saint-Agnet (10) | 1–1 (3–5 p) | FC Morcenx-Arengosse (8) |
| 288. | AS Villandraut-Préchac (11) | 1–5 | ES Audenge (7) |
| 289. | Kanboko Izarra (11) | 1–3 | FA Morlaàs Est Béarn (7) |
| 290. | AS Lous Marous/FC Saint-Geours (10) | 3–3 (1–3 p) | Espérance Oeyreluy (11) |
| 291. | US Marsan (9) | 0–8 | Hasparren FC (8) |
| 292. | SC Cabanac Villagrain (12) | 1–4 | JS Teichoise (9) |
| 293. | SC Taron Sévignacq (11) | 3–1 | FC Lons (8) |
| 294. | ES Bournos-Doumy-Garlède (10) | 0–3 | AS Mazères-Uzos-Rontignan (8) |
| 295. (Note: Tie was added after the original draw took place.) | SA Mauléonais (8) | 2–2 (3–2 p) | Les Labourdins d'Ustaritz (8) |

=== Second round ===
These matches were played on 3, 4 and 5 September 2021.

Second round results: Nouvelle Aquitaine
| Tie no | Home team (tier) | Score | Away team (tier) |
|---|---|---|---|
| 1. | Antran SL (8) | 1–3 | ES Beaumont-Saint-Cyr (7) |
| 2. | ES Eysinaise (9) | 5–1 | AJ Montmoreau (10) |
| 3. | FC Talence (7) | 1–3 | FC des Portes de l'Entre-Deux-Mers (6) |
| 4. | La Thibérienne (8) | 1–2 | CO Coulouniex-Chamiers (9) |
| 5. | FC Objat (10) | 0–6 | Périgueux Foot (10) |
| 6. | FC Gradignan (10) | 0–1 | FC des Graves (7) |
| 7. | US La Crèche (10) | 0–3 | Étoile Maritime FC (7) |
| 8. | Limoges Football (9) | 2–1 | SA Le Palais-sur-Vienne (7) |
| 9. | CS Boussac (8) | 3–0 | CA Peyrat-la-Nonière (9) |
| 10. | AS Facture-Biganos Boïens (8) | 2–2 (4–3 p) | St Paul Sport (6) |
| 11. | FA Morlaàs Est Béarn (7) | 1–2 | JA Biarritz (7) |
| 12. | ES Nouaillé (8) | 1–6 | ES Buxerolles (6) |
| 13. | US Vasléenne (9) | 0–3 | RC Parthenay Viennay (7) |
| 14. | ES Oyré-Dangé (9) | 2–0 | US Leignes-sur-Fontaine (10) |
| 15. | ES Saint-Benoit (8) | 0–1 | FC Smarves Iteuil (9) |
| 16. | US Pays Maixentais (8) | 3–3 (1–3 p) | US Vicq-sur-Gartempe (8) |
| 17. | SC Verrières (9) | 3–0 | US Mélusine (9) |
| 18. | ES Ardin (9) | 0–0 (4–2 p) | US Avanton (10) |
| 19. | FC Airvo Saint-Jouin (9) | 2–2 (6–5 p) | FC Nueillaubiers (6) |
| 20. | AS Valdivienne (10) | 1–1 (2–3 p) | CA Saint-Savin-Saint-Germain (7) |
| 21. | Gati-Foot (10) | 5–1 | ES Pays Thénezéen (10) |
| 22. | ES Champniers (8) | 0–3 | FC Charente Limousine (7) |
| 23. | Tardoire FC La Roche/Rivières (8) | 1–1 (4–5 p) | SC Verneuil-sur-Vienne (8) |
| 24. | AS Brie (9) | 2–2 (2–4 p) | AS Saint-Junien (8) |
| 25. | Avenir Bellac-Berneuil-Saint-Junien-les-Combes (8) | 0–2 | UES Montmorillon (6) |
| 26. | FC Charentais L'Isle-d'Espagnac (10) | 0–7 | US Veyrac (10) |
| 27. | ACG Foot Sud 86 (10) | 3–3 (4–3 p) | FC Boutonnais (10) |
| 28. | Avenir Nord Foot 87 (10) | 0–7 | Stade Ruffec (7) |
| 29. | US Chasseneuil (10) | 5–1 | FC Saint-Brice-sur-Vienne (10) |
| 30. | AS Bel-Air (11) | 2–4 | AS Puymoyen (8) |
| 31. | AAAM Laleu-La Pallice (8) | 0–0 (4–2 p) | Avenir 79 FC (9) |
| 32. | Aunis AFC (9) | 1–1 (2–4 p) | FC Périgny (7) |
| 33. | Rochefort FC (7) | 2–2 (5–4 p) | AS Cozes (7) |
| 34. | AS Périgné (12) | 2–0 | ESAB 96 FC (10) |
| 35. | ES Celles-Verrines (8) | 1–3 | SC Saint-Jean-d'Angély (6) |
| 36. | EFC DB2S (8) | 0–4 | Royan Vaux AFC (6) |
| 37. | FC Saint-Rogatien (10) | 0–1 | ASFC Vindelle (8) |
| 38. | ALFC Fontcouverte (10) | 1–1 (2–4 p) | ES Saintes (7) |
| 39. | La Jarrie FC (10) | 1–5 | FC Chauray (6) |
| 40. | FC Rouillac (11) | 1–4 | CS Saint-Michel-sur-Charente (9) |
| 41. | US Bessines-Morterolles (8) | 1–2 | ES Bénévent-Marsac (9) |
| 42. | AS Gouzon (7) | 5–0 | Vigenal FC Limoges (8) |
| 43. | FC Argentat (8) | 1–0 | USS Mérinchal (9) |
| 44. | AS Châteauneuf-Neuvic (8) | 1–1 (4–1 p) | JS Lafarge Limoges (7) |
| 45. | CA Meymac (8) | 0–2 | JA Isle (6) |
| 46. | ES Nonards (8) | 0–0 (3–5 p) | ES Guérétoise (6) |
| 47. | FC Périgord Centre (8) | 4–1 | Occitane FC (9) |
| 48. | USA Montbronn (10) | 5–2 | US Marsaneix Manoire (11) |
| 49. | US Donzenac (7) | 2–2 (4–1 p) | AS Saint-Pantaleon (6) |
| 50. | Auvézère Mayne FC (9) | 0–3 | ASV Malemort (9) |
| 51. | FC Cœur Médoc Atlantique (7) | 3–0 | US Cenon Rive Droite (8) |
| 52. | FC Arsac-Pian Médoc (8) | 1–4 | FCE Mérignac Arlac (6) |
| 53. | FC Martignas-Illac (8) | 0–0 (3–5 p) | JS Sireuil (7) |
| 54. | Entente Saint-Séverin/Palluaud (10) | 2–4 | Montpon-Ménesplet FC (8) |
| 55. | SC Mouthiers (9) | 1–1 (8–9 p) | FC Saint André-de-Cubzac (7) |
| 56. | FC Grand Saint-Emilionnais (7) | 2–1 | CA Sainte-Hélène (7) |
| 57. | FC Sévigné Jonzac-Saint-Germain (8) | 3–1 | CA Ribéracois (8) |
| 58. | US La Gémoze (10) | 1–5 | ES Bruges (10) |
| 59. | Union Saint-Médard Petit-Palais (10) | 0–2 | US Mussidan-Saint Medard (6) |
| 60. | US Pons (10) | 1–1 (3–4 p) | FC Saint-Médard-en-Jalles (6) |
| 61. | SU Agen (8) | 0–0 (7–8 p) | FC Vallée du Lot (7) |
| 62. | AS Marcellus-Cocumont (9) | 0–6 | SA Mérignac (6) |
| 63. | Entente Boé Bon-Encontre (7) | 3–3 (4–5 p) | Jeunesse Villenave (6) |
| 64. | Labenne OSC (8) | 1–1 (4–2 p) | Violette Aturine (8) |
| 65. | AS Pontonx (8) | 1–2 | AS Mazères-Uzos-Rontignan (8) |
| 66. | FC Roquefort Saint-Justin (9) | 1–5 | SA Mauléonais (8) |
| 67. | FC Oloronais (9) | 0–1 | SC Saint-Pierre-du-Mont (7) |
| 68. | FC Casteljaloux (10) | 0–2 | Croisés Saint-André Bayonne (7) |
| 69. | Stade Ygossais (7) | 3–1 | Élan Béarnaise Orthez (6) |
| 70. | FC Saint-Vincent-de-Paul (9) | 1–0 | Avenir Mourenxois (10) |
| 71. | FC Luy de Béarn (8) | 2–1 | Association Saint-Laurent Billère (9) |
| 72. | Espérance Availles-en-Châtellerault (10) | 2–2 (4–5 p) | FC Vouneuil-sous-Biard-Béruges (10) |
| 73. | FC Saint-Jean-Missé (11) | 4–0 | FC Chanteloup-Courlay-Chapelle (10) |
| 74. | FC Sud Gâtine (10) | 0–2 | La Ligugéenne Football (7) |
| 75. | FC Fontaine-le-Comte (8) | 4–0 | AS Portugais Châtellerault (8) |
| 76. | US Vouillé (11) | 3–5 | Espérance Terves (8) |
| 77. | ES Saint-Amand-sur-Sèvre (11) | 0–1 | CS Naintré (7) |
| 78. | US Thuré-Besse (10) | 4–0 | FC Chiché (11) |
| 79. | ES Boismé Clessé (12) | 0–5 | Thouars Foot 79 (6) |
| 80. | ES Louzy (10) | 0–1 | EF Le Tallud (7) |
| 81. | FC Jardres (12) | 0–3 | US Migné-Auxances (7) |
| 82. | AS Portugais Cerizay (10) | 4–1 | ES Fayenoirterre (11) |
| 83. | Avenir Autize (11) | 7–0 | US Champdeniers-Pamplie (11) |
| 84. | FC Montamisé (10) | 1–3 | US Saint-Sauveur (7) |
| 85. | ES Trois Cités Poitiers (9) | 2–0 | FC Pays de l'Ouin (8) |
| 86. | Chasseneuil-Saint-Georges FC (9) | 2–3 | CO Cerizay (8) |
| 87. | FC Fleuré (9) | 0–3 | AS Mignaloux-Beauvoir (7) |
| 88. | AS Poitiers Gibauderie Mahorais (11) | 2–3 | JS Nieuil l'Espoir (8) |
| 89. | Valence-en-Poitou OC (10) | 5–3 | Inter Bocage FC (9) |
| 90. | US Leigné-sur-Usseau (11) | 1–11 | SA Moncoutant (7) |
| 91. | ES Aubinrorthais (8) | 3–1 | CA Saint-Aubin-le-Cloud (9) |
| 92. | FC Comores Bressuire (11) | 1–1 (1–3 p) | FC Pays Argentonnais (9) |
| 93. | CS Saint-Angeau (10) | 0–1 | ES Clussais (11) |
| 94. | OC Sommières Saint-Romain (11) | 2–0 | FC des 2 Vallées (9) |
| 95. | ES Brion-Saint-Secondin (10) | 2–1 | OFC Ruelle (8) |
| 96. | SC Agris (13) | 0–2 | US Abzac (11) |
| 97. | AS Lussac-les-Églises (11) | 2–4 | Fontafie FC (11) |
| 98. | FC Usson-Isle (9) | 2–1 | ES Mornac (10) |
| 99. | Rochechouart OC (11) | 1–3 | AS Aixoise (7) |
| 100. | AS Pays Mellois (8) | 2–5 | FC Portes d'Océan 17 (9) |
| 101. | Aviron Boutonnais (9) | 3–0 | ES Tonnacquoise-Lussantaise (10) |
| 102. | JS Semussac (10) | 0–9 | ES La Rochelle (6) |
| 103. | FC Essouvert Loulay (10) | 1–6 | US Marennaise (8) |
| 104. | ASS Portugais La Rochelle (11) | 0–3 (Note: Tie won by means of forfeit.) | Saint-Palais SF (8) |
| 105. | FC Seudre Ocean (10) | 1–2 | AS Cabariot (8) |
| 106. | Breuil-Magné FC (11) | 2–2 (4–2 p) | OL Saint-Liguaire Niort (6) |
| 107. | US Lezay (10) | 2–1 | Oléron FC (8) |
| 108. | AR Cherveux (12) | 1–3 | CS Leroy Angoulême (7) |
| 109. | Stade Vouillé (8) | 2–2 (3–4 p) | ES Linars (9) |
| 110. | Entente Foot 16 (11) | 0–6 | Capaunis ASPTT FC (8) |
| 111. | CS Venise Verte (11) | 2–3 | UAS Verdille (9) |
| 112. | ES Brûlain (10) | 2–1 | AS Échiré Saint-Gelais (6) |
| 113. | US Aigrefeuille (9) | 0–1 | FC Nord 17 (8) |
| 114. | US Mauzé-sur-le-Mignon (10) | 0–2 | AS Saint-Yrieix (9) |
| 115. | Jarnac SF (7) | 1–2 | UA Niort Saint-Florent (7) |
| 116. | ACS La Rochelle (10) | 1–1 (5–3 p) | AS Réthaise (7) |
| 117. | ES Beaubreuil (7) | 3–2 | USE Couzeix-Chaptelat (7) |
| 118. | AS Saint-Sulpice-le-Guérétois (8) | 1–3 | AS Panazol (7) |
| 119. | Boisseuil FC (10) | 3–0 | Diables Bleus Bersac (11) |
| 120. | AC Kurdes Limoges (10) | 0–1 | EF Aubussonnais (8) |
| 121. | Amicale Franco-Portugais Limoges (7) | 3–3 (5–6 p) | Tulle Football Corrèze (7) |
| 122. | AS Saint-Just-le-Martel (10) | 3–3 (3–5 p) | ES Marchoise (7) |
| 123. | Limoges Landouge (7) | 2–1 | CA Rilhac-Rancon (7) |
| 124. | USC Bourganeuf (9) | 0–7 | CS Feytiat (6) |
| 125. | CA Chamboulive (9) | 3–3 (5–4 p) | US Saint-Léonard-de-Noblat (8) |
| 126. | AS Marcillac Clergoux (11) | 2–4 | FC Cornilois-Fortunadais (9) |
| 127. | US La Roche l'Abeille (9) | 0–13 | ESA Brive (6) |
| 128. | FC Pays de Mareuil (8) | 5–3 | ES Portugais Brive (10) |
| 129. | US Lanteuil (9) | 0–2 | ES Boulazac (6) |
| 130. | AS Nexon (9) | 3–2 | ASPO Brive (8) |
| 131. | AS Aiguille Bosmie Charroux (11) | 2–4 | SS Sainte-Féréole (8) |
| 132. | Foot Sud 87 (9) | 0–1 | Athlético Vernois (10) |
| 133. | FC Cublac (12) | 2–2 (3–4 p) | FC Thenon-Limeyrat-Fossemagne (7) |
| 134. | SA Sanilhacois (9) | 2–2 (5–6 p) | Limens JSA (8) |
| 135. | FC Bassimilhacois (9) | 7–0 | US Tocane-Saint-Apre (10) |
| 136. | Cosnac FC (10) | 0–10 | AS Nontron-Saint-Pardoux (7) |
| 137. | APCS Mahorais Brive (11) | 1–3 | US Chancelade/Marsac (9) |
| 138. | SC Séreilhac (11) | 1–1 (4–5 p) | AS Jugeals-Noailles (9) |
| 139. | FC Côteaux Libournais (8) | 4–1 | AC Sud Saintonge (9) |
| 140. | Parempuyre FC (11) | 1–2 | AS Le Taillan (8) |
| 141. | Stade Blayais (11) | 4–2 | AS Pays de Montaigne et Gurçon (9) |
| 142. | FC Sud 17 (9) | 1–0 | AS Merpins (7) |
| 143. | ES Ambares (8) | 1–3 | US Lormont (6) |
| 144. | AG Vendays-Montalivet (11) | 0–2 | FC Loubesien (9) |
| 145. | CMO Bassens (9) | 1–3 | Alliance Foot 3B (8) |
| 146. | Bordeaux Étudiants CF (10) | 3–2 | CS Portugais Villenave-d'Ornon (9) |
| 147. | Union Saint-Jean (11) | 1–5 | FC Estuaire Haute Gironde (6) |
| 148. | US Ma Campagne Angoulême (10) | 0–2 | FC Mascaret (6) |
| 149. | CO La Couronne (8) | 1–1 (0–3 p) | ES Blanquefort (6) |
| 150. | RC Bordeaux Métropole (8) | 0–3 | US Bouscataise (7) |
| 151. | Saint-Seurin Saint-Estèphe FC (11) | 0–3 | Coqs Rouges Bordeaux (7) |
| 152. | SJ Macaudaise (9) | 3–0 | SC Bastidienne (9) |
| 153. | FC Pessac Alouette (7) | 0–2 | FC Marmande 47 (6) |
| 154. | Football Sud Bastide (10) | 1–8 | FC Pays Aurossais (8) |
| 155. | JS Saint-Christophe-de-Double (11) | 0–4 | ASSA Pays du Dropt (8) |
| 156. | CA Carignanais (11) | 2–1 | AS Castillonnès Cahuzac Lalande (8) |
| 157. | FC Porte d'Aquitaine 47 (9) | 1–2 | Stade Saint-Médardais (7) |
| 158. | SJ Bergerac (11) | 1–2 | US Port Sainte-Marie Feugarolles (10) |
| 159. | US Bazeillaise (11) | 4–1 | FLR Le Monteil (11) |
| 160. | US Allemans-du-Dropt (11) | 1–1 (5–4 p) | FC Faux (9) |
| 161. | SC Astaffortais (11) | 0–9 | Langon FC (7) |
| 162. | AS Beautiran FC (12) | 0–1 | Targon-Soulignac FC (9) |
| 163. | Mas AC (9) | 0–4 | CA Béglais (7) |
| 164. | AS Gensac-Montcaret (8) | 0–1 | US Virazeil-Puymiclan (9) |
| 165. | FC Côteaux Pécharmant (9) | 0–3 | La Brède FC (6) |
| 166. | SC Cadaujac (8) | 0–2 | SAG Cestas (6) |
| 167. | SC Monségur (11) | 0–5 | Confluent Football 47 (7) |
| 168. | Saint-Seurin JC (12) | 0–4 | US La Catte (7) |
| 169. | FC Gironde La Réole (9) | 0–7 | Union Saint-Bruno (7) |
| 170. | Espérance Oeyreluy (11) | 2–4 | FC Parentis (9) |
| 171. | SC Taron Sévignacq (11) | 0–3 | US Portugais Pau (7) |
| 172. | Cazaux Olympique (9) | 1–3 | Seignosse-Capbreton-Soustons FC (7) |
| 173. | RC Dax (11) | 0–5 | FC Lescar (6) |
| 174. | AL Poey-de-Lescar (7) | 3–5 | Elan Boucalais (7) |
| 175. | ES Meillon-Assat-Narcastet (8) | 3–1 | JS Teichoise (9) |
| 176. | Sud Gironde FC (10) | 2–2 (4–2 p) | FC Saint-Martin-de-Seignanx (8) |
| 177. | ES Pyrénéenne (10) | 2–2 (6–7 p) | SC Arthez Lacq Audejos (8) |
| 178. | FC Lacajunte-Tursan (9) | 2–5 | CA Sallois (9) |
| 179. | Ardanavy FC (11) | 0–0 (2–4 p) | Andernos Sport FC (7) |
| 180. | Baiona FC (10) | 1–4 | Arin Luzien (6) |
| 181. | ES Audenge (7) | 2–3 | FC Doazit (7) |
| 182. | CS Lantonnais (8) | 1–0 | JA Dax (7) |
| 183. | Carresse Salies FC (10) | 0–3 | FC La Ribère (8) |
| 184. | FC Belin-Béliet (8) | 3–0 | Hasparren FC (8) |
| 185. | Pardies Olympique (8) | 1–1 (5–6 p) | Hiriburuko Ainhara (6) |
| 186. | AS Artix (8) | 0–2 | FC Bassin d'Arcachon (6) |
| 187. | US Castétis-Gouze (9) | 3–2 | FC Artiguelouve-Arbus-Aubertin (10) |
| 188. | ES Nay-Vath-Vielha (9) | 9–0 | FC Morcenx-Arengosse (8) |

=== Third round ===
These matches were played on 17, 18 and 19 September 2021.

Third round results: Nouvelle Aquitaine
| Tie no | Home team (tier) | Score | Away team (tier) |
|---|---|---|---|
| 1. | ES Meillon-Assat-Narcastet (8) | 1–4 | Aviron Bayonnais FC (5) |
| 2. | ES Beaumont-Saint-Cyr (7) | 2–2 (4–3 p) | ES Aubinrorthais (8) |
| 3. | Espérance Terves (8) | 2–2 (4–3 p) | ES Oyré-Dangé (9) |
| 4. | Montpon-Ménesplet FC (8) | 1–2 | Jeunesse Villenave (6) |
| 5. | FC Airvo Saint-Jouin (9) | 1–1 (3–0 p) | EF Le Tallud (7) |
| 6. | FC Bassin d'Arcachon (6) | 1–0 | Hiriburuko Ainhara (6) |
| 7. | JS Nieuil l'Espoir (8) | 0–2 | Thouars Foot 79 (6) |
| 8. | Seignosse-Capbreton-Soustons FC (7) | 2–2 (4–5 p) | FC Luy de Béarn (8) |
| 9. | FC des Graves (7) | 3–3 (3–4 p) | Croisés Saint-André Bayonne (7) |
| 10. | FC des Portes de l'Entre-Deux-Mers (6) | 2–0 | US Bouscataise (7) |
| 11. | SS Sainte-Féréole (8) | 1–4 | AS Aixoise (7) |
| 12. | UES Montmorillon (6) | 0–5 | Stade Poitevin FC (5) |
| 13. | US Marennaise (8) | 1–0 | FC Chauray (6) |
| 14. | CO Coulouniex-Chamiers (9) | 2–3 | UA Cognac (5) |
| 15. | La Ligugéenne Football (7) | 1–1 (9–10 p) | SO Châtellerault (5) |
| 16. | ACG Foot Sud 86 (10) | 0–1 | CA Saint-Savin-Saint-Germain (7) |
| 17. | US Chasseneuil (10) | 1–4 | FC Nord 17 (8) |
| 18. | FC Saint-Vincent-de-Paul (9) | 2–1 | SC Saint-Pierre-du-Mont (7) |
| 19. | JA Biarritz (7) | 0–1 | FC Doazit (7) |
| 20. | Capaunis ASPTT FC (8) | 4–2 | AS Cabariot (8) |
| 21. | US Portugais Pau (7) | 2–1 | SA Mérignac (6) |
| 22. | ES Ardin (9) | 1–0 | Valence-en-Poitou OC (10) |
| 23. | SC Saint-Jean-d'Angély (6) | 3–1 | FC Périgny (7) |
| 24. | EF Aubussonnais (8) | 2–1 | Tulle Football Corrèze (7) |
| 25. | Fontafie FC (11) | 2–0 | US Abzac (11) |
| 26. | SC Verrières (9) | 0–1 | US Migné-Auxances (7) |
| 27. | FC Thenon-Limeyrat-Fossemagne (7) | 1–4 | Alliance Foot 3B (8) |
| 28. | Périgueux Foot (10) | 1–7 | US Lormont (6) |
| 29. | AS Nontron-Saint-Pardoux (7) | 5–0 | FC Pays de Mareuil (8) |
| 30. | JS Sireuil (7) | 3–3 (5–4 p) | FC Sévigné Jonzac-Saint-Germain (8) |
| 31. | Arin Luzien (6) | 1–1 (4–2 p) | Union Saint-Bruno (7) |
| 32. | SA Mauléonais (8) | 2–2 (5–4 p) | FC Lescar (6) |
| 33. | SC Arthez Lacq Audejos (8) | 1–2 | FC Tartas Saint-Yaguen (5) |
| 34. | CS Saint-Michel-sur-Charente (9) | 6–1 | ES Saintes (7) |
| 35. | CS Feytiat (6) | 1–0 | FC Charente Limousine (7) |
| 36. | FC Cornilois-Fortunadais (9) | 0–4 | ES Guérétoise (6) |
| 37. | Rochefort FC (7) | 0–2 | AAAM Laleu-La Pallice (8) |
| 38. | ES Boulazac (6) | 0–0 (5–3 p) | Royan Vaux AFC (6) |
| 39. | ESA Brive (6) | 1–1 (5–4 p) | JA Isle (6) |
| 40. | FC Argentat (8) | 1–4 | FC Fontaine-le-Comte (8) |
| 41. | AS Jugeals-Noailles (9) | 0–1 | US Donzenac (7) |
| 42. | USA Montbronn (10) | 0–6 | CS Boussac (8) |
| 43. | AS Saint-Junien (8) | 0–3 | Limoges Football (9) |
| 44. | FC Portes d'Océan 17 (9) | 3–2 | AS Saint-Yrieix (9) |
| 45. | ASSA Pays du Dropt (8) | 2–0 | ES Blanquefort (6) |
| 46. | FC Parentis (9) | 0–2 | CS Lantonnais (8) |
| 47. | Stade Ruffec (7) | 3–1 | AS Châteauneuf-Neuvic (8) |
| 48. | FC Belin-Béliet (8) | 5–0 | ES Nay-Vath-Vielha (9) |
| 49. | La Brède FC (6) | 2–1 | Andernos Sport FC (7) |
| 50. | Coqs Rouges Bordeaux (7) | 1–1 (4–3 p) | US Lège Cap Ferret (5) |
| 51. | US Port Sainte-Marie Feugarolles (10) | 0–2 | US La Catte (7) |
| 52. | FC Mascaret (6) | 1–2 | FC Grand Saint-Emilionnais (7) |
| 53. | ES Bruges (10) | 1–2 | FC Estuaire Haute Gironde (6) |
| 54. | Targon-Soulignac FC (9) | 0–6 | Stade Bordelais (5) |
| 55. | Stade Blayais (11) | 1–3 | FCE Mérignac Arlac (6) |
| 56. | FC Pays Aurossais (8) | 1–1 (5–4 p) | FC Sud 17 (9) |
| 57. | CA Carignanais (11) | 0–1 | FC Côteaux Libournais (8) |
| 58. | Bordeaux Étudiants CF (10) | 1–5 | Stade Saint-Médardais (7) |
| 59. | US Virazeil-Puymiclan (9) | 2–2 (5–3 p) | FC Cœur Médoc Atlantique (7) |
| 60. | Athlético Vernois (10) | 1–7 | US Mussidan-Saint Medard (6) |
| 61. | Sud Gironde FC (10) | 0–4 | Labenne OSC (8) |
| 62. | Langon FC (7) | 1–1 (5–4 p) | CA Béglais (7) |
| 63. | CA Sallois (9) | 6–2 | FC La Ribère (8) |
| 64. | Confluent Football 47 (7) | 3–1 | Elan Boucalais (7) |
| 65. | AS Facture-Biganos Boïens (8) | 0–3 | Genêts Anglet (5) |
| 66. | SAG Cestas (6) | 6–3 | Stade Ygossais (7) |
| 67. | FC Vouneuil-sous-Biard-Béruges (10) | 4–0 | Gati-Foot (10) |
| 68. | AS Périgné (12) | 1–4 | RC Parthenay Viennay (7) |
| 69. | US Veyrac (10) | 0–8 | AS Gouzon (7) |
| 70. | US Bazeillaise (11) | 3–0 | SJ Macaudaise (9) |
| 71. | AS Le Taillan (8) | 4–1 | FC Vallée du Lot (7) |
| 72. | Breuil-Magné FC (11) | 2–3 | US Chancelade/Marsac (9) |
| 73. | AS Mazères-Uzos-Rontignan (8) | 1–1 (7–6 p) | US Castétis-Gouze (9) |
| 74. | ES Linars (9) | 0–0 (4–5 p) | Aviron Boutonnais (9) |
| 75. | UA Niort Saint-Florent (7) | 2–1 | AS Mignaloux-Beauvoir (7) |
| 76. | ES Trois Cités Poitiers (9) | 3–2 | CS Naintré (7) |
| 77. | FC Pays Argentonnais (9) | 3–3 (4–3 p) | US Lezay (10) |
| 78. | OC Sommières Saint-Romain (11) | 0–3 | FC Bressuire (5) |
| 79. | ES Brûlain (10) | 1–4 | US Saint-Sauveur (7) |
| 80. | US Vicq-sur-Gartempe (8) | 2–0 | FC Smarves Iteuil (9) |
| 81. | AS Portugais Cerizay (10) | 1–1 (3–4 p) | CO Cerizay (8) |
| 82. | ES Clussais (11) | 0–4 | CA Neuville (5) |
| 83. | FC Usson-Isle (9) | 1–2 | SA Moncoutant (7) |
| 84. | FC Saint-Jean-Missé (11) | 2–1 | Avenir Autize (11) |
| 85. | US Thuré-Besse (10) | 2–6 | ES Buxerolles (6) |
| 86. | AS Puymoyen (8) | 2–1 | FC Périgord Centre (8) |
| 87. | Étoile Maritime FC (7) | 2–0 | CS Leroy Angoulême (7) |
| 88. | FC Loubesien (9) | 3–2 | FC Marmande 47 (6) |
| 89. | ACS La Rochelle (10) | 3–0 (Note: Tie won by means of forfeit.) | ASFC Vindelle (8) |
| 90. | Limens JSA (8) | 7–1 | UAS Verdille (9) |
| 91. | FC Bassimilhacois (9) | 1–3 | ES La Rochelle (6) |
| 92. | Saint-Palais SF (8) | 1–3 | FC Libourne (5) |
| 93. | Limoges Landouge (7) | 0–1 | US Chauvigny (5) |
| 94. | ES Bénévent-Marsac (9) | 1–0 | CA Chamboulive (9) |
| 95. | ES Brion-Saint-Secondin (10) | 1–3 | AS Nexon (9) |
| 96. | Boisseuil FC (10) | 1–3 | ES Marchoise (7) |
| 97. | ASV Malemort (9) | 0–0 (3–4 p) | SC Verneuil-sur-Vienne (8) |
| 98. | AS Panazol (7) | 5–0 | ES Beaubreuil (7) |
| 99. | US Allemans-du-Dropt (11) | 0–8 | FC Saint André-de-Cubzac (7) |
| 100. | ES Eysinaise (9) | 1–2 | FC Saint-Médard-en-Jalles (6) |

=== Fourth round ===
These matches were played on 2 and 3 October 2021.

Fourth round results: Nouvelle Aquitaine
| Tie no | Home team (tier) | Score | Away team (tier) |
|---|---|---|---|
| 1. | Espérance Terves (8) | 0–6 | CA Neuville (5) |
| 2. | ES Bénévent-Marsac (9) | 3–7 | AS Aixoise (7) |
| 3. | AS Gouzon (7) | 2–3 | Trélissac-Antonne Périgord FC (4) |
| 4. | Stade Bordelais (5) | 4–1 | UA Cognac (5) |
| 5. | FC des Portes de l'Entre-Deux-Mers (6) | 0–2 | Bergerac Périgord FC (4) |
| 6. | Limoges Football (9) | 3–6 | ES Guérétoise (6) |
| 7. | AAAM Laleu-La Pallice (8) | 0–1 | SO Châtellerault (5) |
| 8. | ES Boulazac (6) | 1–1 (3–4 p) | AS Panazol (7) |
| 9. | FC Luy de Béarn (8) | 0–3 | FC Doazit (7) |
| 10. | ES La Rochelle (6) | 2–2 (5–4 p) | RC Parthenay Viennay (7) |
| 11. | FC Estuaire Haute Gironde (6) | 0–3 | FC Saint André-de-Cubzac (7) |
| 12. | FC Saint-Vincent-de-Paul (9) | 3–2 | Croisés Saint-André Bayonne (7) |
| 13. | CO Cerizay (8) | 1–1 (3–4 p) | UA Niort Saint-Florent (7) |
| 14. | FC Airvo Saint-Jouin (9) | 1–3 | US Vicq-sur-Gartempe (8) |
| 15. | ES Buxerolles (6) | 2–2 (5–4 p) | Étoile Maritime FC (7) |
| 16. | Capaunis ASPTT FC (8) | 0–2 | FC Bressuire (5) |
| 17. | US Migné-Auxances (7) | 4–0 | FC Nord 17 (8) |
| 18. | FC Portes d'Océan 17 (9) | 2–3 | FC Grand Saint-Emilionnais (7) |
| 19. | ASSA Pays du Dropt (8) | 1–1 (3–1 p) | SC Saint-Jean-d'Angély (6) |
| 20. | Aviron Boutonnais (9) | 1–1 (5–6 p) | ES Ardin (9) |
| 21. | Labenne OSC (8) | 1–1 (7–6 p) | Coqs Rouges Bordeaux (7) |
| 22. | SA Mauléonais (8) | 3–1 | La Brède FC (6) |
| 23. | CS Saint-Michel-sur-Charente (9) | 2–2 (3–4 p) | ESA Brive (6) |
| 24. | CS Boussac (8) | 2–1 | SC Verneuil-sur-Vienne (8) |
| 25. | CA Saint-Savin-Saint-Germain (7) | 3–1 | US Donzenac (7) |
| 26. | EF Aubussonnais (8) | 0–3 | Stade Poitevin FC (5) |
| 27. | CS Feytiat (6) | 2–0 | Stade Ruffec (7) |
| 28. | Fontafie FC (11) | 0–6 | AS Puymoyen (8) |
| 29. | US La Catte (7) | 1–3 | US Marennaise (8) |
| 30. | FC Côteaux Libournais (8) | 3–3 (4–3 p) | FC Loubesien (9) |
| 31. | AS Le Taillan (8) | 1–0 | FC Saint-Médard-en-Jalles (6) |
| 32. | US Virazeil-Puymiclan (9) | 1–3 | AS Nontron-Saint-Pardoux (7) |
| 33. | Alliance Foot 3B (8) | 1–4 | FC Libourne (5) |
| 34. | US Bazeillaise (11) | 3–4 | JS Sireuil (7) |
| 35. | US Chancelade/Marsac (9) | 1–4 | US Lormont (6) |
| 36. | ES Trois Cités Poitiers (9) | 2–1 | Thouars Foot 79 (6) |
| 37. | FC Vouneuil-sous-Biard-Béruges (10) | 1–4 | SA Moncoutant (7) |
| 38. | ACS La Rochelle (10) | 0–1 | ES Beaumont-Saint-Cyr (7) |
| 39. | FC Saint-Jean-Missé (11) | 2–3 | US Saint-Sauveur (7) |
| 40. | FC Pays Argentonnais (9) | 0–4 | Angoulême Charente FC (4) |
| 41. | Limens JSA (8) | 4–2 | US Mussidan-Saint Medard (6) |
| 42. | AS Nexon (9) | 0–1 | ES Marchoise (7) |
| 43. | FC Fontaine-le-Comte (8) | 0–5 | US Chauvigny (5) |
| 44. | FC Tartas Saint-Yaguen (5) | 1–2 | FC Bassin d'Arcachon (6) |
| 45. | AS Mazères-Uzos-Rontignan (8) | 0–1 | FCE Mérignac Arlac (6) |
| 46. | FC Pays Aurossais (8) | 0–3 | US Portugais Pau (7) |
| 47. | Confluent Football 47 (7) | 0–2 | Genêts Anglet (5) |
| 48. | Stade Saint-Médardais (7) | 3–2 | Stade Montois (4) |
| 49. | SAG Cestas (6) | 3–0 | Arin Luzien (6) |
| 50. | CA Sallois (9) | 1–1 (3–4 p) | Langon FC (7) |
| 51. | FC Belin-Béliet (8) | 1–4 | Jeunesse Villenave (6) |
| 52. | CS Lantonnais (8) | 2–1 | Aviron Bayonnais FC (5) |

=== Fifth round ===
These matches were played on 16 and 17 October 2021.

Fifth round results: Nouvelle Aquitaine
| Tie no | Home team (tier) | Score | Away team (tier) |
|---|---|---|---|
| 1. | Stade Poitevin FC (5) | 2–2 (3–2 p) | SO Châtellerault (5) |
| 2. | ES La Rochelle (6) | 3–1 | CA Saint-Savin-Saint-Germain (7) |
| 3. | ES Ardin (9) | 0–4 | ESA Brive (6) |
| 4. | ES Marchoise (7) | 1–5 | US Chauvigny (5) |
| 5. | US Marennaise (8) | 1–1 (3–5 p) | AS Puymoyen (8) |
| 6. | CS Boussac (8) | 1–2 | CS Feytiat (6) |
| 7. | AS Aixoise (7) | 0–3 | CA Neuville (5) |
| 8. | US Portugais Pau (7) | 0–6 | Bergerac Périgord FC (4) |
| 9. | Labenne OSC (8) | 1–2 | SAG Cestas (6) |
| 10. | FC Doazit (7) | 2–1 | Jeunesse Villenave (6) |
| 11. | Langon FC (7) | 3–2 | JS Sireuil (7) |
| 12. | FCE Mérignac Arlac (6) | 0–0 (6–7 p) | Trélissac-Antonne Périgord FC (4) |
| 13. | Limens JSA (8) | 6–1 | SA Mauléonais (8) |
| 14. | FC Grand Saint-Emilionnais (7) | 1–2 | Stade Bordelais (5) |
| 15. | FC Saint-Vincent-de-Paul (9) | 1–1 (3–4 p) | FC Bassin d'Arcachon (6) |
| 16. | FC Saint André-de-Cubzac (7) | 1–1 (4–5 p) | AS Le Taillan (8) |
| 17. | ASSA Pays du Dropt (8) | 0–2 | US Lormont (6) |
| 18. | AS Panazol (7) | 1–1 (5–4 p) | ES Buxerolles (6) |
| 19. | ES Trois Cités Poitiers (9) | 1–4 | ES Guérétoise (6) |
| 20. | US Vicq-sur-Gartempe (8) | 1–2 | FC Bressuire (5) |
| 21. | UA Niort Saint-Florent (7) | 1–5 | Angoulême Charente FC (4) |
| 22. | SA Moncoutant (7) | 3–1 | US Migné-Auxances (7) |
| 23. | ES Beaumont-Saint-Cyr (7) | 4–1 | US Saint-Sauveur (7) |
| 24. | FC Côteaux Libournais (8) | 1–2 | CS Lantonnais (8) |
| 25. | AS Nontron-Saint-Pardoux (7) | 1–1 (3–2 p) | Genêts Anglet (5) |
| 26. | Stade Saint-Médardais (7) | 3–3 (2–3 p) | FC Libourne (5) |

=== Sixth round ===
These matches were played on 30 and 31 October 2021.

Sixth round results: Nouvelle Aquitaine
| Tie no | Home team (tier) | Score | Away team (tier) |
|---|---|---|---|
| 1. | Limens JSA (8) | 3–0 | FC Doazit (7) |
| 2. | CS Feytiat (6) | 2–1 | FC Bassin d'Arcachon (6) |
| 3. | ES La Rochelle (6) | 0–1 | Bergerac Périgord FC (4) |
| 4. | Langon FC (7) | 0–2 | Stade Poitevin FC (5) |
| 5. | SAG Cestas (6) | 2–1 | FC Bressuire (5) |
| 6. | AS Nontron-Saint-Pardoux (7) | 0–3 | FC Libourne (5) |
| 7. | AS Le Taillan (8) | 1–1 (3–4 p) | ESA Brive (6) |
| 8. | US Lormont (6) | 0–2 | Stade Bordelais (5) |
| 9. | AS Panazol (7) | 2–1 | SA Moncoutant (7) |
| 10. | ES Guérétoise (6) | 2–0 | ES Beaumont-Saint-Cyr (7) |
| 11. | CS Lantonnais (8) | 1–2 | US Chauvigny (5) |
| 12. | AS Puymoyen (8) | 0–6 | Trélissac-Antonne Périgord FC (4) |
| 13. | Angoulême Charente FC (4) | 1–0 | CA Neuville (5) |
