= 2017–18 Coupe de France preliminary rounds, Nouvelle-Aquitaine =

The 2017–18 Coupe de France preliminary rounds, Nouvelle-Aquitaine make up the qualifying competition to decide which teams from the French Nouvelle-Aquitaine take part in the main competition from the seventh round.

== First round ==
These matches were played between 25 August and 3 September 2017.

First Round Results: Nouvelle Aquitaine

Tie no	Home team (Tier)	Score	Away team (Tier)
1.	US Anais (12)	0–2	ASFC Vindelle (11)
2.	JS Basseau Angoulême (11)	1–3 (a.e.t.)	Limens JSA (9)
3.	JS Angoulême (12)	1–1 (3–4 p)	US Oradour-sur-Glane (11)
4.	AS Brie (10)	0–1	SC Verneuil-sur-Vienne (8)
5.	ES Champniers (10)	4–2	AS Chazelles (11)
6.	AJ Montmoreau (12)	0–2	OFC Ruelle (8)
7.	ES Mornac (11)	2–3 (a.e.t.)	JS Lafarge Limoges (9)
8.	FC Rouillac (12)	0–1	ES Linars (11)
9.	CS St Michel-sur-Charente (11)	2–4	CA Ribéracois (10)
10.	UAS Verdille (11)	4–3 (a.e.t.)	AS Pays Mellois (9)
11.	US Aigrefeuille (12)	2–4	ES Tonnacquoise-Lussantaise (10)
12.	US Aulnay (10)	1–2 (a.e.t.)	Avenir Matha (10)
13.	CS Bussac-Forêt (11)	1–3	Union St Bruno (9)
14.	EFC DB2S (11)	5–0	ES Port-des-Barques (11)
15.	ALFC Fontcouverte (11)	2–3 (a.e.t.)	AS St Georges-des-Coteaux (11)
16.	FC Sévigné Jonzac-St Germain (10)	1–2	RC Bordeaux Métropole (8)
17.	La Jarrie FC (11)	0–2	US Marennaise (9)
18.	AS Montguyon (10)	0–3	AS Lusitanos Cenon (10)
19.	Aunis AFC (10)	0–7	La Rochelle Villeneuve FC (8)
20.	Rochefort FC (9)	1–0	Stade Vouillé (10)
21.	AS Seilhac (11)	1–2	USC Bourganeuf (9)
22.	Espérance St Robertoise (11)	5–1	AS Beynat (9)
23.	EF Aubussonnais (8)	2–1	US St Léonard-de-Noblat (8)
24.	CO Coulouniex-Chamiers (9)	1–4	AS Nontron-St Pardoux (9)
25.	US Meyrals (12)	2–2 (2–4 p)	AS Rouffignac-Plazac (9)
26.	ES Montignacoise (10)	2–3	AS Laguenne-Ste Fortunade-Lagarde-Enval (11)
27.	Vaillante Sportive Caudrot (10)	2–1	US Virazeil-Puymiclan (10)
28.	FC Coteaux Bourgeais (9)	6–0	US Nord Gironde (10)
29.	Fraternelle Landiras (11)	2–2 (3–4 p)	US Port Ste Marie-Feugarolles (9)
30.	FC Gironde La Réole (11)	3–0	AS Villandraut-Préchac (10)
31.	FC Barpais (11)	4–2	US Illadaise (10)
32.	St Seurin JC (9)	1–2	US Galgonnaise (10)
33.	RC Laurence (11)	2–1	St Sulpice Jeunesse (11)
34.	FC Médoc Côte d'Argent (9)	2–1	JS Teichoise (9)
35.	Violette Aturine (9)	2–4	Stade Ygossais (8)
36.	JA Dax (9)	3–1	ES Meillon-Assat-Narcastet (8)
37.	Labenne OSC (10)	3–0 (Note: Match won by means of forfeit.) (Note: Match was ordered to be replayed after the referee omitted to play extra time in the original fixture, which ES Bournos-Doumy-Garlède won on penalty kicks.)	ES Bournos-Doumy-Garlède (11)
38.	FC Born (10)	1–3	FC Lescar (8)
39.	Seignosse-Capbreton-Soutsons FC (9)	2–1 (a.e.t.)	FC La Ribère (9)
40.	US Gontaud (10)	3–3 (6–5 p)	CA Sallois (10)
41.	FC Nérac (9)	2–0	AS Marcellus-Cocumont (9)
42.	Union Jurançonnaise (10)	2–0	Hasparren FC (8)
43.	Monein FC (11)	0–1	AS Pontonx (9)
44.	Les Labourdins d'Ustaritz (9)	2–3	ES Montoise (10)
45.	FC Airvo St Jouin (10)	3–0	US Mirebeau (11)
46.	ES Ardin (10)	3–1	FC Nord 17 (9)
47.	Val de Boutonne Foot 79 (11)	1–1 (2–0 p)	UA St Sulpice-de-Cognac (11)
48.	US Fenioux (12)	0–3	ES Aunisienne Aytré (9)
49.	ACG Foot Sud 86 (11)	1–2	RC Parthenay Viennay (8)
50.	AS Ingrandes (12)	2–3	FC Montamisé (10)
51.	FC Loudun (11)	2–5	CO St Genest d'Ambière (12)
52.	US Mélusine (10)	1–1 (3–4 p)	EF Le Tallud (9)
53.	US Migné-Auxances (8)	8–0	ES St Cerbouillé (9)
54.	US Payroux (12)	0–2	SC Verrières (11)
55.	ES St Benoit (9)	6–4 (a.e.t.)	SA Moncoutant (8)
56.	CA St Savin-St Germain (8)	2–0	FC Confolentais (9)
57.	Avenir Bellac-Berneuil-St Junien-les-Combes (10)	4–1	ES St Maurice-la-Souterraine (10)
58.	AS Châteauneuf-Neuvic (9)	4–2	CA Meymac (8)
59.	USE Couzeix-Chaptelat (9)	0–3	AS St Junien (9)
60.	US Le Dorat (12)	1–2	AS Valdivienne (12)
61.	US Solignac-Le Vigen (11)	0–3	AS Nieul (8)
62.	AS Aigre (11)	3–1	ES Brûlain (12)
63.	ESE Charentais (11)	5–0	SS Sillars (12)
64.	US St Martin (13)	0–14	AS St Yrieix (9)
65.	FC Sud Charente (10)	0–1 (a.e.t.)	FC Cubnezais (12)
66.	FC Haute Charente (13)	1–2	Tardoire FC La Roche/Rivières (9)
67.	CO La Couronne (10)	6–0	US Châteauneuf 16 (11)
68.	Coqs Rouges Mansle (10)	1–3	FC Boutonnais (10)
69.	AS Merpins (10)	3–0	JS Sireuil (8)
70.	AS Mons (12)	0–8	Jarnac SF (8)
71.	FC Taizé-Aizie (12)	2–7	Sud Vienne Région de Couhé (11)
72.	AS Cabariot (10)	0–1	ES Celles-Verrines (8)
73.	Clérac-Orignolles-St Martin-du-Lary (11)	2–1	ES Bruges (8)
74.	FC Brizambourg-Écoyeux (11)	0–4	Aviron Boutonnais (9)
75.	JS Semussac (10)	3–4	US Baignes (10)
76.	ES St Just-Luzac (11)	0–3	St Palais SF (8)
77.	Stade Boisseuillais (13)	0–3	Oléron FC (9)
78.	ES Surgères (12)	1–3	ASPTT Bessines (12)
79.	APCS Mahorais Brive (11)	2–6	FRJEP Cornil (10)
80.	AS Chamberet (9)	8–2	JS Chambon-sur-Voueize (10)
81.	AS Concèze (11)	3–3 (2–3 p)	ES Beaubreuil (10)
82.	FC Objat (12)	4–1	FC Cendrieux-La Douze (11)
83.	Entente des Barrages de la Xaintrie (10)	1–2	FC Argentat (8)
84.	US St Clementoise (9)	2–0	Auvézère Foot 19 (10)
85.	FREP St Germain (10)	0–2	CA Égletons (10)
86.	Amicale St Hilaire-Venarsal (10)	7–2	AS Portugais Sarlat (11)
87.	FC St Jal (12)	0–7	AS Panazol (9)
88.	ES Ussac (10)	2–0	SS Ste Féréole (9)
89.	Varetz AC (9)	2–1	AS Jugeals-Noailles (9)
90.	US Felletin (10)	1–2	CS Boussac (8)
91.	US Le Grand-Bourg (11)	0–3	ES St Sulpice-le-Guérétois (9)
92.	USS Mérinchal (9)	1–6	ES Ussel (10)
93.	CA Peyratois (10)	0–3	ES Bénévent-Marsac (10)
94.	SC Sardentais (10)	1–0	US St Vaury (9)
95.	US Versillacoise (11)	2–3	AS Civaux (11)
96.	US St Fiel (10)	4–0	US Vallière (11)
97.	FC Pays Beaumontois (11)	3–1	SC Monségur (10)
98.	FC Belvesois (12)	3–3 (6–5 p)	Cosnac FC (11)
99.	FC Faux (9)	2–0	SU Agen (8)
100.	US Hautefort (12)	1–6	US Donzenac (8)
101.	FC Pays Mareuil (9)	1–0	SC Mouthiers (9)
102.	US Mussidan-St Medard (9)	7–0	US St Denis-de-Pile (10)
103.	AS Neuvic St Léon (10)	2–1	FC Coteaux Libournais (9)
104.	Pays de l'Eyraud (12)	2–3	AS Coteaux Dordogne (10)
105.	AS Pays de Montaigne et Gurçon (9)	2–2 (3–4 p)	FC Villeneuve-sur-Lot (8)
106.	Périgueux Foot (10)	2–4	AS Villebois Haute Boëme (8)
107.	Les Aiglons Razacois (11)	2–3	US Tocane-St Apre (11)
108.	US St Geniès-Archignac-Aubareil (11)	3–4	ES Nonards (8)
109.	AS Laurentine (12)	1–4	Stade Pessacais UC (11)
110.	Élan Salignacois (11)	1–4	Olympique Larche Lafeuillade (9)
111.	JS La Caneda (13)	1–9	AS Antonne-Le Change (8)
112.	AS Segonzac-St Aquilin (11)	1–3	AS Puymoyen (9)
113.	La Thibérienne (12)	3–1	CA Brantômais (10)
114.	Tour Sportive Merles Blanc (11)	1–0	FC Charentais L'Isle-d'Espagnac (11)
115.	AS Villac (13)	0–9	FC Sarlat-Marcillac (8)
116.	US Aillas-Auros (11)	2–3 (a.e.t.)	Sud Gironde FC (11)
117.	CMO Bassens (9)	3–2	SC Aresien (10)
118.	FC Belin-Béliet (9)	4–2	Patronage Bazadais (9)
119.	Bordeaux AC (11)	0–3	US Bouscataise (9)
120.	USJ St Augustin Club Pyrénées Aquitaine (10)	0–4	ES Ambares (8)
121.	SC Bastidienne (11)	1–5	Montpon-Ménesplet FC (9)
122.	ES Canéjan (9)	2–5	Confluent Football 47 (9)
123.	CA Carignanais (12)	3–3 (5–6 p)	CS Portugais Villenave-d'Ornon (9)
124.	US Chartrons (13)	0–3	FC Coteaux Bordelais (9)
125.	US Coutras (10)	1–4	USA St Aigulin (11)
126.	ES Eysinaise (8)	2–1	FC St Laurent d'Arce/St Gervais (9)
127.	US Farguaise (10)	1–1 (3–2 p)	Joyeuse Savignac (10)
128.	CM Floirac (9)	2–4	ES Audenge (8)
129.	AS Gensac-Montcaret (10)	2–2 (5–6 p)	Prigonrieux FC (8)
130.	US Lagorce (12)	2–3 (a.e.t.)	Bouliacaise FC (12)
131.	CS Lantonnais (10)	3–6	FC Arsac-Pian Médoc (9)
132.	AS Le Haillan (10)	3–4	AS Facture-Biganos Boïens (10)
133.	USC Léognan (11)	2–1	Les Bleuets Macariens (11)
134.	FC Lesparre Médoc (10)	1–4	Stade Pauillacais FC (9)
135.	AS Taillan (9)	2–0	FC Medoc Ocean (8)
136.	US Ludonnaise (10)	2–1	FC Médoc Atlantique (11)
137.	Landes Girondines FC (10)	2–0	Cocarde OS St Laurent-Médoc (11)
138.	FC Martignas-Illac (9)	1–2 (a.e.t.)	FC St André-de-Cubzac (8)
139.	ES Mazères-Roaillan (11)	0–2	AGJA Caudéran (9)
140.	AS Avensan-Moulis-Listrac (11)	1–5	CA Ste Hélène (9)
141.	CA Parempuyre (12)	1–1 (5–6 p)	JS Grande Champagne (11)
142.	Bordeaux Étudiants CF (10)	3–0	FC Gradignan (10)
143.	AS St Aubin-de-Médoc (9)	1–0	AS St Seurin-de-Cadourne (10)
144.	JS St Christophe-de-Double (11)	1–4	SJ Macaudaise (9)
145.	Stade St Médardais (8)	3–0	CA Pondaurat (9)
146.	SC St Symphorien (10)	2–4	SC Cadaujac (10)
147.	AS Sauveterrienne (11)	2–1	Entente Boé Bon-Encontre (9)
148.	Targon-Soulignac FC (9)	5–1	US Creysse-Lembras (10)
149.	FC Loubesien (10)	0–3	US Cenon Rive Droite (8)
150.	AS Montferrandaise (11)	1–3	Andernos Sport FC (10)
151.	SC Laruscade (12)	2–5	FC Montendre (11)
152.	FC Vallée de l'Isle (12)	2–4	Joyeuse St Sulpice-et-Cameyrac (10)
153.	FC Izon-Vayres (8)	2–2 (6–5 p)	UF Barbezieux-Barret (9)
154.	RC Chambéry (9)	0–1	US Alliance Talençaise (8)
155.	AS Chambéry (11)	2–4	CA Béglais (8)
156.	SJ Yvrac (11)	3–2	Gué-de-Sénac FC (12)
157.	RC Dax (13)	1–3	Marensin FC (10)
158.	FC Hagetmautien (9)	2–4	US Marsan (10)
159.	JS Laluque-Rion (11)	1–3	CA Morcenx (9)
160.	Chalosse FC (11)	2–6	FC Vallée de l'Ousse (10)
161.	SC St Pierre-du-Mont (8)	2–0	FC Oloronais (9)
162.	Peyrehorade SF (11)	1–3	Croisés St André Bayonne (8)
163.	US Roquefort (10)	6–0	CA Castets-en-Dorthe (11)
164.	FREP St Vincent-de-Paul (11)	1–3	US Portugais Pau (8)
165.	AS Tarnos (10)	4–1	FC des Enclaves et du Plateau (11)
166.	SC Astaffortais (11)	1–3	FC Monbazillac-Sigoules (11)
167.	US Bazeillaise (13)	2–4	FC Clairacais (11)
168.	AS Castillonnès-Cahuzac-Lalandusse (10)	1–0	US La Catte (8)
169.	FC Casteljaloux (11)	2–3	US Lamothe-Mongauzy (11)
170.	Mas AC (10)	0–1	FC Pessac Alouette (9)
171.	Monflanquin FC (10)	3–2	AF Casseneuil-Pailloles-Lédat (9)
172.	AS Miramont-Lavergne (11)	1–9	ASSA Pays du Dropt (9)
173.	Passage FC (10)	5–2	FC Pont-du-Casse-Foulayronnes (10)
174.	AS Franco-Portugais St Pardoux (13)	1–6	AS Beautiran (11)
175.	FC Artiguelouve-Arbus-Aubertin (11)	4–2	AS Lous Marous/FC St Geours (11)
176.	AS Artix (8)	2–1	SA St Severin (9)
177.	US St Michel Arudy (10)	3–1	SC Arthez-Lacq-Audéjos (10)
178.	Ciboure FC (13)	2–3	Étoile Béarnaise FC (9)
179.	Entente Haut Béarn (11)	1–5	SA Mauléonais (9)
180.	Ardanavy FC (11)	0–3	Avenir Mourenxois (8)
181.	FC Lons (9)	2–0	FC Doazit (9)
182.	AS Mazères-Uzos-Rontignon (9)	2–1	FC Luy du Béarn (8)
183.	US Castétis-Gouze (10)	2–4	Bleuets Pau (8)
184.	ES Nay-Vath-Vielha (11)	1–2	JAB Pau (9)
185.	FC Espagnol Pau (11)	3–0	Espérance Oeyreluy (12)
186.	AL Poey-de-Lescar (10)	3–1	FA Bourbaki Pau (9)
187.	Rivehaute Sport (13)	2–7	AS Bretagne-de-Marsan (10)
188.	Carresse Salies FC (12)	3–0	Association Saint Laurent Billère (10)
189.	AS Aiffres (8)	3–1 (a.e.t.)	AS Maritime (9)
190.	CS Beauvoir-sur-Niort (11)	4–1	AL St Brice (10)
191.	Comoriens Bressuire (13)	3–4	AS Portugais Châtellerault (9)
192.	US Brion 79 (13)	1–2	US Nord Vienne (11)
193.	US Champdeniers-Pamplie (12)	4–2	US Frontenay-St Symphorien (12)
194.	FC Chiché (12)	2–3	ES Beaumont-St Cyr (8)
195.	ES Pinbrécières (10)	2–3 (a.e.t.)	Espérance Terves (8)
196.	US Combranssière (8)	6–5 (a.e.t.)	Stade Ruffec (8)
197.	CS Venise Verte (12)	0–1	FC Canton de Courçon (12)
198.	ES Fayenoirterre (12)	0–1	FC Pays Argentonnais (10)
199.	SC L'Absie-Largeasse/Moutiers-sous-Chantmerle (12)	2–0	US Vasléenne (10)
200.	US Lezay (10)	0–1	US Mauzé-sur-le-Mignon (11)
201.	ES Chanteloup-Chapelle (10)	0–6	ES Trois Cités Poitiers (9)
202.	Buslaurs Thireuil (11)	3–4	FC Atlantique (11)
203.	US La Crèche (12)	3–1	SEPC Exireuil (11)
204.	FC Haute Val de Sèvre (12)	3–3 (4–5 p)	US Pays Maixentais (11)
205.	AS Le Beugnon-Béceleuf-Faye (13)	1–4	Échillais-St Agnant-Beaugeay FC (11)
206.	ES Louzy (12)	3–3 (1–3 p)	ASPTT Poitiers (10)
207.	SA Mauzé-Rigné (12)	3–3 (2–4 p) (Note: Match was ordered to be replayed after the referee omitted to play extra time in the original fixture, which A Mauzé-Rigné won on penalty kicks after a 2–2 final score.)	CS Naintré (8)
208.	FC Sud Gatine (12)	0–3	US Aunisien Puyravault (11)
209.	ES Mougon (13)	0–5	AAAM Laleu-La Pallice (9)
210.	ES St Amand-sur-Sèvre (12)	0–4	Chasseneuil-St Georges FC (9)
211.	CA St Aubin-le-Cloud (11)	6–0	AS St Saviol (12)
212.	FC St Jean-Missé (13)	3–1 (a.e.t.)	US Jaunay-Clan (12)
213.	US Vrère-St Léger-de-Montbrun (11)	4–1	SL Antran (10)
214.	Avenir 79 FC (12)	2–6	Gati-Foot (11)
215.	AS St Pierre-des-Échaubrognes (10)	2–1	ES Aubinrorthais (10)
216.	US St Varent Pierregeay (10)	3–0	Ozon FC (10)
217.	US Vergentonnaise (12)	4–0	US Envigne (11)
218.	FC Vrines (11)	1–2	Chabournay FC (12)
219.	Entente Voulmentin-St Aubin-du-Plain (11)	0–7	US St Sauveur (8)
220.	FC ASM (12)	1–3	AS Coulonges-Thouarsais (11)
221.	ES Pays Thénezéen (11)	1–3	Espérance Availles-en-Châtellerault (11)
222.	US Béruges (12)	3–0	ES Bocage (12)
223.	Boivre SC (11)	0–4	US Courlay (9)
224.	FC Cernay (12)	3–2	FC Pays de l'Ouin (9)
225.	ES Charroux-Mauprévoir (14)	1–10	US Lessac (10)
226.	CS Chatain (13)	0–7	JS Nieuil l'Espoir (9)
227.	CS L'Espinasse Chauvigny (14)	0–17	US Bessines/Morterolles (8)
228.	US Couhé-Vérac (14)	1–7	ES Nouaillé (8)
229.	Croutelle FC (15)	1–0	CDJ Pompaire (11)
230.	US La Ferrière-Airoux (13)	0–3	FC Fleuré (10)
231.	ES Lavoux-Liniers (14)	0–11	AS Mignaloux-Beauvoir (9)
232.	US Leignes-sur-Fontaine (12)	3–1	US La Puye-La Bussière (13)
233.	US Marigny St Léger (13)	1–2	ES Oyré-Dangé (9)
234.	US Pressac (13)	1–5	US Usson-du-Poitou (11)
235.	Bel Air Rocs OC Poitiers (12)	2–0	US Vivonne (11)
236.	CEP Poitiers (12)	1–2	FC Fontaine-le-Comte (9)
237.	Entente St Maurice-Gençay (12)	0–2	US Vicq-sur-Gartempe (10)
238.	AAS St Julien-l'Ars (10)	5–0	ES Château-Larcher (10)
239.	AS Sèvres-Anxaumont (11)	1–1 (6–5 p)	ES Beaulieu-Breuil (11)
240.	FC Smarves 1936 (12)	2–3	FC Rouillé (11)
241.	US Thuré Besse (12)	0–3	SL Cenon-sur-Vienne (11)
242.	US Beaune-les-Mines (11)	3–4	ASPTT Limoges (12)
243.	AS Eymoutiers (11)	1–2 (a.e.t.)	SA Le Palais-sur-Vienne (8)
244.	AS La Jonchère-St Maurice (13)	0–2	AS Ambazac (10)
245.	US Nantiat (10)	1–2	ES Brion-St Secondin (10)
246.	AS Nexon (10)	0–1	FC Roullet-St Estèphe (10)
247.	FC Canton d'Oradour-sur-Vayres (11)	0–1	Nersac FC (10)
248.	FC des 2 Vallées (11)	8–1	US Chasseneuil (11)
249.	FC St Brice-sur-Vienne (9)	0–2	FC Charente Limousine (9)

== Second round ==
These matches were played between 2 and 10 September 2017.

Second round results: Nouvelle Aquitaine

Tie no	Home team (tier)	Score	Away team (tier)
1.	Colayrac FC (7)	1–1 (4–2 p)	FC Sarlat-Marcillac (8)
2.	EFC DB2S (11)	1–3	SC St Jean-d'Angély (7)
3.	Pardies Olympique (7)	2–4	St Paul Sport (7)
4.	JAB Pau (9)	0–2	AS Tarnos (10)
5.	FA Morlaàs Est Béarn (7)	1–2	Croisés St André Bayonne (8)
6.	Seignosse-Capbreton-Soutsons FC (9)	0–1	Elan Boucalais (7)
7.	ES Montoise (10)	3–1	FC Espagnol Pau (11)
8.	Union Jurançonnaise (10)	0–0 (2–4 p)	SC St Pierre-du-Mont (8)
9.	FC Gironde La Réole (11)	3–1	FC Nérac (9)
10.	Nersac FC (10)	1–2	FC Grand St Emilionnais (7)
11.	USA St Aigulin (11)	1–2	US Mussidan-St Medard (9)
12.	CA Ribéracois (10)	0–2	ES Ambares (8)
13.	US Marennaise (9)	6–0	US Ludonnaise (10)
14.	AS St Georges-des-Coteaux (11)	1–2 (a.e.t.)	Stade Pauillacais FC (9)
15.	St Palais SF (8)	3–2	ES Saintes (7)
16.	CA Ste Hélène (9)	3–2	FC Estuaire Haute Gironde (7)
17.	FC St Médard-en-Jalles (7)	3–0	RC Bordeaux Métropole (8)
18.	US Gontaud (10)	0–2	Prigonrieux FC (8)
19.	FC Monbazillac-Sigoules (11)	0–2	FC Thenon-Limeyrat-Fossemagne (7)
20.	AS Laguenne-Ste Fortunade-Lagarde-Enval (11)	0–2	AS Châteauneuf-Neuvic (9)
21.	ES Ussel (10)	1–4	CA Rilhac-Rancon (7)
22.	ES Nonards (8)	6–3	EF Aubussonnais (8)
23.	US Bessines/Morterolles (8)	4–1	AS St Junien (9)
24.	Tardoire FC La Roche/Rivières (9)	1–1 (2–0 p)	ES Marchoise (7)
25.	JS Lafarge Limoges (9)	3–0	AS Nieul (8)
26.	ASPTT Limoges (12)	2–1	ES Bénévent-Marsac (10)
27.	UAS Verdille (11)	1–3	ES Celles-Verrines (8)
28.	FC Boutonnais (10)	0–4	Rochefort FC (9)
29.	ES Tonnacquoise-Lussantaise (10)	3–1	Val de Boutonne Foot 79 (11)
30.	ES Champniers (10)	3–5 (a.e.t.)	AS Aiffres (8)
31.	FC Rouillé (11)	1–3	US Pays Maixentais (11)
32.	CA St Savin-St Germain (8)	1–0	La Ligugéenne Football (7)
33.	AS Valdivienne (12)	1–2	ES Nouaillé (8)
34.	SC Verrières (11)	3–2 (a.e.t.)	ES St Benoit (9)
35.	ASPTT Poitiers (10)	0–3	RC Parthenay Viennay (8)
36.	US Courlay (9)	0–2	CO Cerizay (7)
37.	Chasseneuil-St Georges FC (9)	2–2 (2–4 p)	ES Beaumont-St Cyr (8)
38.	FC des Portes de l'Entre-Deux-Mers (7)	4–0	ES Audenge (8)
39.	FC Artiguelouve-Arbus-Aubertin (11)	0–3	AL Poey-de-Lescar (10)
40.	FC Lons (9)	7–1	AS Bretagne-de-Marsan (10)
41.	FC Vallée de l'Ousse (10)	1–0	Avenir Mourenxois (8)
42.	US Marsan (10)	1–2	AS Artix (8)
43.	Hiriburuko Ainhara (7)	3–2	Bleuets Pau (8)
44.	Carresse Salies FC (12)	0–0 (4–1 p)	Marensin FC (10)
45.	US St Michel Arudy (10)	2–0	Étoile Béarnaise FC (9)
46.	FC Lescar (8)	4–0	US Portugais Pau (8)
47.	SA Mauléonais (9)	2–2 (1–3 p)	FC Tartas-St Yaguen (7)
48.	AS Mazères-Uzos-Rontignon (9)	3–5 (a.e.t.)	JA Dax (9)
49.	US Alliance Talençaise (8)	3–0	FC Barpais (11)
50.	SC Cadaujac (10)	3–1	USC Léognan (11)
51.	AS Facture-Biganos Boïens (10)	2–2 (5–6 p)	Coqs Rouges Bordeaux (7)
52.	US Port Ste Marie-Feugarolles (9)	1–1 (2–4 p)	FC Belin-Béliet (9)
53.	AS Beautiran (11)	0–1	Vaillante Sportive Caudrot (10)
54.	CS Portugais Villenave-d'Ornon (9)	2–5	FC des Graves (7)
55.	CA Morcenx (9)	2–0	US Farguaise (10)
56.	Sud Gironde FC (11)	0–6	Stade St Médardais (8)
57.	Confluent Football 47 (9)	2–0	Landes Girondines FC (10)
58.	Stade Ygossais (8)	5–2	Targon-Soulignac FC (9)
59.	Stade Pessacais UC (11)	1–2	Andernos Sport FC (10)
60.	AS Sauveterrienne (11)	0–4	US Roquefort (10)
61.	US Lamothe-Mongauzy (11)	1–6	Biscarrosse OFC (7)
62.	CA Béglais (8)	3–3 (4–2 p)	AGJA Caudéran (9)
63.	Clérac-Orignolles-St Martin-du-Lary (11)	1–0	CMO Bassens (9)
64.	FC Cubnezais (12)	0–2	OFC Ruelle (8)
65.	Bouliacaise FC (12)	0–4	Bordeaux Étudiants CF (10)
66.	US Tocane-St Apre (11)	2–7	AS St Yrieix (9)
67.	FC Coteaux Bordelais (9)	3–0	US Galgonnaise (10)
68.	Joyeuse St Sulpice-et-Cameyrac (10)	5–1	RC Laurence (11)
69.	AS Puymoyen (9)	1–2 (a.e.t.)	CS Leroy Angoulême (7)
70.	SJ Yvrac (11)	0–5	Limens JSA (9)
71.	AS Lusitanos Cenon (10)	3–0	US Cenon Rive Droite (8)
72.	Tour Sportive Merles Blanc (11)	0–2	FC Pays Mareuil (9)
73.	FC Izon-Vayres (8)	5–0	AS Soyaux (7)
74.	ES Linars (11)	0–3	FC St André-de-Cubzac (8)
75.	AS Neuvic St Léon (10)	0–2	AS Villebois Haute Boëme (8)
76.	FC Roullet-St Estèphe (10)	1–3	Montpon-Ménesplet FC (9)
77.	FC Arsac-Pian Médoc (9)	0–1	SA Mérignac (7)
78.	US Baignes (10)	4–4 (2–4 p)	FC Coteaux Bourgeais (9)
79.	JS Grande Champagne (11)	4–3 (a.e.t.)	SJ Macaudaise (9)
80.	FC Montendre (11)	1–3 (a.e.t.)	AS Merpins (10)
81.	AS Taillan (9)	0–1	FC Médoc Côte d'Argent (9)
82.	AS St Aubin-de-Médoc (9)	1–0	ES Blanquefort (7)
83.	Échillais-St Agnant-Beaugeay FC (11)	1–0	Union St Bruno (9)
84.	Jarnac SF (8)	0–1	US Bouscataise (9)
85.	FC Pessac Alouette (9)	2–3	ES Eysinaise (8)
86.	FC Pays Beaumontois (11)	2–4 (a.e.t.)	AS Antonne-Le Change (8)
87.	FC Objat (12)	0–1 (a.e.t.)	AS Castillonnès-Cahuzac-Lalandusse (10)
88.	FC Villeneuve-sur-Lot (8)	6–2	Olympique Larche Lafeuillade (9)
89.	FC Faux (9)	3–0	Monflanquin FC (10)
90.	ASSA Pays du Dropt (9)	1–2	AS Rouffignac-Plazac (9)
91.	FC Belvesois (12)	2–5	Passage FC (10)
92.	ES Ussac (10)	2–3	AS St Pantaleon (7)
93.	FC Clairacais (11)	3–4	Espérance St Robertoise (11)
94.	Varetz AC (9)	0–3	ESA Brive (7)
95.	AS Panazol (9)	6–1	SC Sardentais (10)
96.	Amicale St Hilaire-Venarsal (10)	0–3	SA Le Palais-sur-Vienne (8)
97.	CA Égletons (10)	0–4	US Donzenac (8)
98.	AS Ambazac (10)	5–4 (a.e.t.)	FC Argentat (8)
99.	USC Bourganeuf (9)	1–0	FRJEP Cornil (10)
100.	AS Nontron-St Pardoux (9)	2–0	Amicale Franco-Portugais Limoges (7)
101.	ES Beaubreuil (10)	1–4	US St Clementoise (9)
102.	La Thibérienne (12)	0–2	AS Chamberet (9)
103.	ES St Sulpice-le-Guérétois (9)	2–0	Avenir Bellac-Berneuil-St Junien-les-Combes (10)
104.	ESE Charentais (11)	3–0	FC des 2 Vallées (11)
105.	US Oradour-sur-Glane (11)	0–4	US Usson-du-Poitou (11)
106.	US St Fiel (10)	0–4	AS Gouzon (7)
107.	FC Charente Limousine (9)	2–1 (a.e.t.)	SC Verneuil-sur-Vienne (8)
108.	US Lessac (10)	3–2	CS Boussac (8)
109.	US Mauzé-sur-le-Mignon (11)	0–7	AS Réthaise (7)
110.	AS Aigre (11)	2–4	CS Beauvoir-sur-Niort (11)
111.	Avenir Matha (10)	2–2 (4–2 p)	ES La Rochelle (7)
112.	ASPTT Bessines (12)	2–5	ES Aunisienne Aytré (9)
113.	US Aunisien Puyravault (11)	0–4	ASFC Vindelle (11)
114.	US La Crèche (12)	0–1	Aviron Boutonnais (9)
115.	La Rochelle Villeneuve FC (8)	1–0	AAAM Laleu-La Pallice (9)
116.	FC Canton de Courçon (12)	0–1	Oléron FC (9)
117.	UA Niort St Florent (8)	1–5	FC Périgny (7)
118.	FC Atlantique (11)	8–2	Sud Vienne Région de Couhé (11)
119.	AS Portugais Niort (7)	3–1	Capaunis ASPTT FC (7)
120.	US Béruges (12)	1–6	ES Trois Cités Poitiers (9)
121.	AS Mignaloux-Beauvoir (9)	2–4	AAS St Julien-l'Ars (10)
122.	CA St Aubin-le-Cloud (11)	1–5	FC Fontaine-le-Comte (9)
123.	Gati-Foot (11)	2–3	ES Brion-St Secondin (10)
124.	SC L'Absie-Largeasse/Moutiers-sous-Chantmerle (12)	1–3	JS Nieuil l'Espoir (9)
125.	Croutelle FC (15)	1–2	ES Ardin (10)
126.	AS Sèvres-Anxaumont (11)	2–1	AS Civaux (11)
127.	Bel Air Rocs OC Poitiers (12)	1–2	FC Fleuré (10)
128.	US Champdeniers-Pamplie (12)	1–4	EF Le Tallud (9)
129.	FC Pays Argentonnais (10)	4–1	SL Cenon-sur-Vienne (11)
130.	Chabournay FC (12)	1–2	US Migné-Auxances (8)
131.	AS Coulonges-Thouarsais (11)	2–3	US Vrère-St Léger-de-Montbrun (11)
132.	Espérance Availles-en-Châtellerault (11)	3–2	FC Cernay (12)
133.	US Leignes-sur-Fontaine (12)	0–4	US Combranssière (8)
134.	CO St Genest d'Ambière (12)	3–1	US Vergentonnaise (12)
135.	AS St Pierre-des-Échaubrognes (10)	1–1 (3–5 p)	US St Sauveur (8)
136.	US Nord Vienne (11)	0–1	FC Airvo St Jouin (10)
137.	ES Oyré-Dangé (9)	2–3 (a.e.t.)	US Vicq-sur-Gartempe (10)
138.	Espérance Terves (8)	2–1	FC Nueillaubiers (7)
139.	US St Varent Pierregeay (10)	0–6	ES Buxerolles (7)
140.	AS Portugais Châtellerault (9)	2–2 (3–2 p)	FC Montamisé (10)
141.	AS Coteaux Dordogne (10)	1–0	CO La Couronne (10)
142.	AS Pontonx (9)	5–1	Labenne OSC (10)
143.	FC St Jean-Missé (13)	1–3	CS Naintré (8)

== Third round ==
These matches were played between 9 and 16 September 2017.

Third round results: Nouvelle Aquitaine

Tie no	Home team (tier)	Score	Away team (tier)
1.	ESA Brive (7)	0–2	UES Montmorillon (6)
2.	FC Bressuire (5)	1–0	AS Échiré St Gelais (6)
3.	ES Buxerolles (7)	3–0	OL St Liguaire Niort (6)
4.	FC Bassin d'Arcachon (6)	2–1	AS Cozes (5)
5.	JS Lafarge Limoges (9)	0–3	ES Guérétoise (7)
6.	SA Le Palais-sur-Vienne (8)	2–1	USC Bourganeuf (9)
7.	ASPTT Limoges (12)	1–10	CA Rilhac-Rancon (7)
8.	AS Gouzon (7)	1–0	US Donzenac (8)
9.	Espérance St Robertoise (11)	0–4	AS Châteauneuf-Neuvic (9)
10.	US Migné-Auxances (8)	0–3	SO Châtellerault (6)
11.	FC Airvo St Jouin (10)	0–3	AS Réthaise (7)
12.	CA St Savin-St Germain (8)	4–2	AS Portugais Châtellerault (9)
13.	ES Ardin (10)	2–3	US St Sauveur (8)
14.	CO Cerizay (7)	0–5	AS Portugais Niort (7)
15.	ES Nonards (8)	1–4	AS Aixois (6)
16.	Angoulême CFC (5)	5–0	ES Boulazac (6)
17.	ES Montoise (10)	6–0	Carresse Salies FC (12)
18.	Arin Luzien (6)	3–3 (5–4 p)	Élan Béarnaise Orthez (6)
19.	FC Médoc Côte d'Argent (9)	2–1	CA Ste Hélène (9)
20.	Rochefort FC (9)	2–3	SAG Cestas (6)
21.	FC St Médard-en-Jalles (7)	0–0 (3–2 p)	US Alliance Talençaise (8)
22.	Oléron FC (9)	1–0 (a.e.t.)	US Bouscataise (9)
23.	Royan Vaux AFC (6)	3–1	SC St Jean-d'Angély (7)
24.	ES Tonnacquoise-Lussantaise (10)	0–3	US Marennaise (9)
25.	Aviron Boutonnais (9)	0–2	ES Eysinaise (8)
26.	FC des Portes de l'Entre-Deux-Mers (7)	2–1	FC Izon-Vayres (8)
27.	Prigonrieux FC (8)	5–3 (a.e.t.)	AS Rouffignac-Plazac (9)
28.	SC Verrières (11)	0–5	Poitiers FC (5)
29.	FC Coteaux Bourgeais (9)	3–3 (4–5 p)	UA Cognac (6)
30.	CS Leroy Angoulême (7)	4–1	US Chauvigny (6)
31.	JS Grande Champagne (11)	2–5	OFC Ruelle (8)
32.	ESE Charentais (11)	0–0 (4–3 p)	FC Pays Mareuil (9)
33.	CS Beauvoir-sur-Niort (11)	1–4	US Usson-du-Poitou (11)
34.	FC Fleuré (10)	6–1	US Lessac (10)
35.	ES Nouaillé (8)	1–1 (3–4 p)	Tardoire FC La Roche/Rivières (9)
36.	AS Villebois Haute Boëme (8)	2–3	ES Celles-Verrines (8)
37.	AS Nontron-St Pardoux (9)	1–3	AS St Yrieix (9)
38.	JS Nieuil l'Espoir (9)	3–0	Avenir Matha (10)
39.	AS Aiffres (8)	3–1	FC Charente Limousine (9)
40.	ASFC Vindelle (11)	1–2	AS Antonne-Le Change (8)
41.	AS Castillonnès-Cahuzac-Lalandusse (10)	0–2	FC Faux (9)
42.	US St Clementoise (9)	0–3	JA Isle (6)
43.	AS Chamberet (9)	4–6	AS St Pantaleon (7)
44.	AS Panazol (9)	2–0	US Bessines/Morterolles (8)
45.	ES Beaumont-St Cyr (8)	1–5	Thouars Foot 79 (6)
46.	US Vicq-sur-Gartempe (10)	1–2	US Pays Maixentais (11)
47.	AAS St Julien-l'Ars (10)	1–2 (a.e.t.)	Espérance Terves (8)
48.	ES Trois Cités Poitiers (9)	1–7	FC Chauray (6)
49.	FC Pays Argentonnais (10)	3–1	FC Périgny (7)
50.	CO St Genest d'Ambière (12)	1–6 (a.e.t.)	CA Neuville (6)
51.	US Combranssière (8)	0–1	ES Aunisienne Aytré (9)
52.	US Vrère-St Léger-de-Montbrun (11)	0–3	AS Sèvres-Anxaumont (11)
53.	La Rochelle Villeneuve FC (8)	4–1	RC Parthenay Viennay (8)
54.	FC Atlantique (11)	2–3	FC Fontaine-le-Comte (9)
55.	CS Feytiat (5)	2–1 (a.e.t.)	Tulle Football Corèze (6)
56.	ES St Sulpice-le-Guérétois (9)	0–0 (3–1 p)	AS Ambazac (10)
57.	ES Brion-St Secondin (10)	2–0	Espérance Availles-en-Châtellerault (11)
58.	Stade St Médardais (8)	3–3 (7–8 p)	FC Thenon-Limeyrat-Fossemagne (7)
59.	Bordeaux Étudiants CF (10)	0–3	CA Béglais (8)
60.	AS St Aubin-de-Médoc (9)	0–7	US Lège Cap Ferret (5)
61.	Vaillante Sportive Caudrot (10)	1–4	Elan Boucalais (7)
62.	FC Vallée de l'Ousse (10)	1–3	Hiriburuko Ainhara (7)
63.	AS Artix (8)	2–0	CA Morcenx (9)
64.	St Paul Sport (7)	3–0	Croisés St André Bayonne (8)
65.	FC Belin-Béliet (9)	0–2	FC des Graves (7)
66.	FC Lons (9)	3–3 (4–5 p)	JA Biarritz (6)
67.	AL Poey-de-Lescar (10)	1–2	Biscarrosse OFC (7)
68.	SC St Pierre-du-Mont (8)	2–3 (a.e.t.)	FC Lescar (8)
69.	US St Michel Arudy (10)	2–3 (a.e.t.)	Langon FC (6)
70.	FC Tartas-St Yaguen (7)	0–2	Genêts Anglet (5)
71.	US Roquefort (10)	0–4	Stade Ygossais (8)
72.	AS Tarnos (10)	0–8	Aviron Bayonnais FC (5)
73.	Échillais-St Agnant-Beaugeay FC (11)	1–2 (a.e.t.)	Stade Pauillacais FC (9)
74.	Clérac-Orignolles-St Martin-du-Lary (11)	0–5	FCE Mérignac Arlac (5)
75.	SC Cadaujac (10)	0–6	FC Libourne (5)
76.	Confluent Football 47 (9)	3–2	AS Coteaux Dordogne (10)
77.	Limens JSA (9)	2–1 (a.e.t.)	Colayrac FC (7)
78.	Passage FC (10)	0–2	FC Gironde La Réole (11)
79.	Joyeuse St Sulpice-et-Cameyrac (10)	0–2	FC Marmande 47 (6)
80.	US Mussidan-St Medard (9)	0–0 (3–4 p)	Jeunesse Villenave (6)
81.	FC Villeneuve-sur-Lot (8)	0–5	US Lormont (6)
82.	FC Coteaux Bordelais (9)	0–1	Coqs Rouges Bordeaux (7)
83.	AS Lusitanos Cenon (10)	1–4	FC Grand St Emilionnais (7)
84.	Montpon-Ménesplet FC (9)	0–1	La Brède FC (6)
85.	AS Merpins (10)	2–2 (3–5 p)	Andernos Sport FC (10)
86.	SA Mérignac (7)	5–0	FC St André-de-Cubzac (8)
87.	ES Ambares (8)	4–1	St Palais SF (8)
88.	JA Dax (9)	1–2	AS Pontonx (9)
89.	CS Naintré (8)	2–0	EF Le Tallud (9)

== Fourth round ==
These matches were played on 23 and 24 September 2017.

Fourth round results: Nouvelle Aquitaine

Tie no	Home team (tier)	Score	Away team (tier)
1.	SA Mérignac (7)	1–7	Stade Bordelais (4)
2.	AS Châteauneuf-Neuvic (9)	0–4	Limoges FC (4)
3.	FC Lescar (8)	0–3	US Lège Cap Ferret (5)
4.	FC Thenon-Limeyrat-Fossemagne (7)	3–2	FC Libourne (5)
5.	SA Le Palais-sur-Vienne (8)	1–2 (a.e.t.)	Thouars Foot 79 (6)
6.	ES Celles-Verrines (8)	2–3	AS Gouzon (7)
7.	US Lormont (6)	1–2	Angoulême CFC (5)
8.	CA Neuville (6)	2–1	Poitiers FC (5)
9.	JA Biarritz (6)	2–3	FC Bassin d'Arcachon (6)
10.	AS Pontonx (9)	1–2 (a.e.t.)	FC des Graves (7)
11.	Tardoire FC La Roche/Rivières (9)	1–5	FCE Mérignac Arlac (5)
12.	UA Cognac (6)	0–4	Trélissac FC (4)
13.	FC Grand St Emilionnais (7)	0–2	Prigonrieux FC (8)
14.	ES Montoise (10)	2–1	CA Béglais (8)
15.	OFC Ruelle (8)	1–1 (5–4 p)	AS St Yrieix (9)
16.	AS Réthaise (7)	0–7	CS Feytiat (5)
17.	FC Médoc Côte d'Argent (9)	1–3 (a.e.t.)	JA Isle (6)
18.	AS Aixois (6)	1–0	CS Leroy Angoulême (7)
19.	US Pays Maixentais (11)	0–1	FC Pays Argentonnais (10)
20.	SO Châtellerault (6)	3–1	ES Buxerolles (7)
21.	ES Eysinaise (8)	0–1 (a.e.t.)	US Marennaise (9)
22.	ES Aunisienne Aytré (9)	2–0	Oléron FC (9)
23.	UES Montmorillon (6)	1–3 (a.e.t.)	FC Bressuire (5)
24.	CS Naintré (8)	1–2	ES Guérétoise (7)
25.	Stade Ygossais (8)	2–1	SAG Cestas (6)
26.	FC Gironde La Réole (11)	0–2	Stade Montois (4)
27.	Andernos Sport FC (10)	1–7	St Paul Sport (7)
28.	Hiriburuko Ainhara (7)	0–1 (a.e.t.)	Jeunesse Villenave (6)
29.	Elan Boucalais (7)	0–1	FC Marmande 47 (6)
30.	Coqs Rouges Bordeaux (7)	2–1	Arin Luzien (6)
31.	AS Artix (8)	0–0 (4–3 p)	Genêts Anglet (5)
32.	ES Ambares (8)	3–4	FC St Médard-en-Jalles (7)
33.	La Brède FC (6)	1–0	Biscarrosse OFC (7)
34.	Limens JSA (9)	2–1	AS St Pantaleon (7)
35.	Confluent Football 47 (9)	0–4	Aviron Bayonnais FC (5)
36.	AS Antonne-Le Change (8)	7–1	La Rochelle Villeneuve FC (8)
37.	ES St Sulpice-le-Guérétois (9)	0–1	CA Rilhac-Rancon (7)
38.	US Usson-du-Poitou (11)	0–2	FC Fontaine-le-Comte (9)
39.	AS Sèvres-Anxaumont (11)	3–0	US St Sauveur (8)
40.	ES Brion-St Secondin (10)	3–3 (3–4 p)	JS Nieuil l'Espoir (9)
41.	AS Portugais Niort (7)	0–4	FC Chauray (6)
42.	ESE Charentais (11)	0–4	AS Panazol (9)
43.	Stade Pauillacais FC (9)	1–2 (a.e.t.)	Royan Vaux AFC (6)
44.	Espérance Terves (8)	1–0	AS Aiffres (8)
45.	Langon FC (6)	2–1	FC des Portes de l'Entre-Deux-Mers (7)
46.	FC Fleuré (10)	2–6	CA St Savin-St Germain (8)
47.	FC Faux (9)	0–4	Bergerac Périgord FC (4)

== Fifth round ==
These matches were played on 7 and 8 October 2017.

Fifth round results: Nouvelle Aquitaine

Tie no	Home team (tier)	Score	Away team (tier)
1.	AS Artix (8)	0–1	Aviron Bayonnais FC (5)
2.	US Lège Cap Ferret (5)	2–1	FC Bassin d'Arcachon (6)
3.	FC des Graves (7)	1–2 (a.e.t.)	Pau FC (3)
4.	FC Thenon-Limeyrat-Fossemagne (7)	0–4	FCE Mérignac Arlac (5)
5.	AS Gouzon (7)	0–2	SO Châtellerault (6)
6.	Jeunesse Villenave (6)	2–3 (a.e.t.)	FC Marmande 47 (6)
7.	Prigonrieux FC (8)	2–3	Stade Ygossais (8)
8.	OFC Ruelle (8)	4–1	Coqs Rouges Bordeaux (7)
9.	Angoulême CFC (5)	5–1	JA Isle (6)
10.	CA Rilhac-Rancon (7)	1–3	Thouars Foot 79 (6)
11.	CA St Savin-St Germain (8)	1–0	ES Guérétoise (7)
12.	ES Montoise (10)	1–3 (a.e.t.)	La Brède FC (6)
13.	FC St Médard-en-Jalles (7)	0–3	Stade Bordelais (4)
14.	US Marennaise (9)	4–1 (a.e.t.)	Limens JSA (9)
15.	St Paul Sport (7)	0–3	Bergerac Périgord FC (4)
16.	AS Antonne-Le Change (8)	0–1	AS Aixois (6)
17.	AS Panazol (9)	3–2	ES Aunisienne Aytré (9)
18.	FC Fontaine-le-Comte (9)	1–4	CS Feytiat (5)
19.	FC Pays Argentonnais (10)	2–0	CA Neuville (6)
20.	JS Nieuil l'Espoir (9)	0–2	FC Chauray (6)
21.	AS Sèvres-Anxaumont (11)	0–5	FC Bressuire (5)
22.	Espérance Terves (8)	0–4 (a.e.t.)	Limoges FC (4)
23.	Langon FC (6)	5–3	Stade Montois (4)
24.	Royan Vaux AFC (6)	0–1 (a.e.t.)	Trélissac FC (4)

== Sixth round ==
These matches were played on 21 and 22 October 2017.

Sixth round results: Nouvelle Aquitaine

Tie no	Home team (tier)	Score	Away team (tier)
1.	Trélissac FC (4)	0–2	Bergerac Périgord FC (4)
2.	Pau FC (3)	0–1	Stade Bordelais (4)
3.	Aviron Bayonnais FC (5)	2–1	US Lège Cap Ferret (5)
4.	CA St Savin-St Germain (8)	2–4	Langon FC (6)
5.	US Marennaise (9)	0–1	CS Feytiat (5)
6.	Thouars Foot 79 (6)	0–1	Angoulême CFC (5)
7.	OFC Ruelle (8)	1–6	FCE Mérignac Arlac (5)
8.	SO Châtellerault (6)	1–2	Limoges FC (4)
9.	AS Aixois (6)	2–5	FC Bressuire (5)
10.	Stade Ygossais (8)	2–0	FC Chauray (6)
11.	AS Panazol (9)	1–2	La Brède FC (6)
12.	FC Pays Argentonnais (10)	2–2 (4–1 p)	FC Marmande 47 (6)
