= La Rochelle (disambiguation) =

La Rochelle is a city in Charente-Marine, France.

La Rochelle may also refer to:

== Places ==
=== France ===
- Arrondissement of La Rochelle, Charente-Maritime
- La Rochelle-1, La Rochelle-2, etc.; nine cantons in Charente-Maritime's 1st constituency
- La Rochelle, Haute-Saône, a commune

=== Elsewhere ===
- La Rochelle, Manitoba, Canada, a locality
- La Rochelle, Johannesburg, South Africa, a suburb
- La Rochelle (Zimbabwe), a country estate

== Sport ==
- ES La Rochelle, a French association football club
- Stade Rochelais, a French rugby union club

== Other uses ==
- John of la Rochelle (died 1245), French Franciscan theologian
- Pierre Drieu La Rochelle (1893–1945), French writer
- Battle of La Rochelle (disambiguation)
- La Rochelle University, La Rochelle, France
- La Rochelle station, the main railway station for La Rochelle, Charente-Maritime, France
- La Rochelle, a restaurant in Aoyama, Tokyo, owned by Hiroyuki Sakai

== See also ==
- La Rochelle-Normande, Manche, France
- Rochelle (disambiguation)
- Larochelle, surname
