= Rochelle =

Rochelle may refer to:

== Places ==
- Rochelle, Florida, an unincorporated community
- Rochelle, Georgia, a city
- Rochelle, Illinois, a city
- Rochelle, Texas, an unincorporated community
- Lake Rochelle, north of Winter Haven, Florida
- La Rochelle, a city in France

== People and fictional characters ==
- Rochelle (given name), a list of people and fictional characters
- Rochelle (surname), a list of people
- Rochelle Perts (born 1992), stage name Rochelle, Surinamese-Dutch singer

== Schools ==
- Rochelle School, Rochelle, Florida, on the National Register of Historic Places
- Rochelle School of the Arts, Lakeland, Florida
- Rochelle Township High School, Rochelle, Illinois, United States
- Rochelle High School (Texas), United States
- Rochelle School (Ireland), Cork, Ireland, a former predominantly Church of Ireland preparatory school for girls merged into Ashton School in 1972

== Other uses ==
- Rochelle (LB&SCR no.119), a London, Brighton and South Coast Railway E1 class
- Rochelle, Rochelle, a fictional recurring film in the TV series Seinfeld

== See also ==
- Rochelle Park, New Jersey
- New Rochelle (disambiguation)
- La Rochelle (disambiguation)
- Rochell
