= Larochelle =

Larochelle or LaRochelle is a surname. Notable people with the surname include:

- Jess Larochelle (1982–2023), Canadian war hero
- Fernand Larochelle (1909–1978), Canadian farmer, business owner and politician
- Claude Larochelle (1931 –2002), Canadian hockey journalist
- Lucas LaRochelle, Canadian artist and designer
- Claudia Larochelle (born 1978) Quebec journalist
- William S. LaRochelle, American college basketball coach
- Alexandra Larochelle (born 1993), Canadian writer.
- Bill LaRochelle (1926–2011), Canadian sprinter
- Pat Larochelle (1891–1944) Canadian professional ice hockey player
- Sophie LaRochelle, Canadian engineer and professor
- Wildor Larochelle (1905–1964), Canadian ice hockey forward
- Florette Villemure Larochelle, Canadian politician
- Joseph-Théophile Larochelle (1877–1954), Quebec politician
- Raegan LaRochelle, American politician from the state of Maine
- John Larochelle, American politician from the state of New Hampshire

== See also ==
- La Rochelle, city in France
- Larochelle River, river in Quebec
- Napoleon LaRochelle Two-Family House, historic site
