= Battle of La Rochelle (disambiguation) =

Battle of La Rochelle or Siege of La Rochelle may refer to:

- Siege of La Rochelle (1224) between the Capetians and the Plantagenets
- Battle of La Rochelle (1372) between the Castilians and the English in a naval battle off La Rochelle
- Battle of La Rochelle (1419) between the Castilians and a joint Flemish-Hanseatic fleet off La Rochelle
- Siege of La Rochelle (1572–1573) between the Huguenots and the Catholics during the Wars of Religion
- Siege of La Rochelle (1627–1628) between the Royalists and the Huguenots
- Allied siege of La Rochelle (1944–1945) between the Allies and the Germans during the Second World War

== See also ==
- Blockade of La Rochelle (1621-1622)
- La Rochelle
- La Rochelle (disambiguation)
- Rochelle (disambiguation)
- fr:Bataille de La Rochelle
- fr:Siège de La Rochelle
