= Queer Nature =

Website and educational initiative

- Website type: Educational
- Founders: Pınar Sinopoulos-Lloyd; So Sinopoulos-Lloyd
- Website: www.queernature.org

Queer Nature is a website and educational initiative currently located in Washington state centered on providing LGBTQ+ people a better understanding of nature.

Some of the past topics covered by the initiative have included queering activist practices and thinking around climate change, and organizing group learning and community building events throughout Washington state and the wider Pacific Northwest region.
