= Rochell =

Rochell is a surname. Notable people with the name include:

- Holly Heston Rochell, daughter of American actor Charlton Heston (1923–2008)
- Isaac Rochell (born 1995), American former professional football player
- Megan Rochell (born 1985), American contemporary R&B singer
- Robert Rochell (born 1998), American professional football cornerback

== See also ==
- Rochell & the Candles, one hit wonder group from Los Angeles, California
- Rochelle (disambiguation)
