= New Rochelle (disambiguation) =

New Rochelle may refer to:

- New Rochelle, New York State, USA; a city in Westchester County
- New Rochelle station (Amtrak code: NRO), New Rochelle, Westchester, NYS, USA; a train station, serving Metro North commuter line and Amtrak intercity service
- New Rochelle Mall, New Rochelle, Westchester, NYS, USA; a shopping center
- City School District of New Rochelle, New Rochelle, Westchester, NYS, USA; a public schools school district
- College of New Rochelle, New Rochelle, Westchester, NYS, USA; a private Catholic college
- New Rochelle High School (NRHS), New Rochelle, Westchester, NYS, USA

== See also ==
- New Rochelle Walk of Fame, New Rochelle, Westchester, NYS, USA
- New Rochelle Handicap (horseracing)
- Rochelle (disambiguation)
