= Rochelle (given name) =

- Gender: Female

Origin
- Origin: French German
- Meaning: "Little rock" "Rest"

Rochelle is a given name for women.

== Notable people ==
- Rochelle Abramson, American violinist
- Rochelle Alers (born 1963), American writer
- Rochelle Aytes (born 1976), American actress
- Rochelle Ballantyne (born 1995), American chess player
- Rochelle Ballard (born 1971), American surfer
- Rochelle Blumenfeld (born 1936), American artist
- Rochelle Buffenstein, American biologist, senior principal investigator
- Rochelle Clark (born 1981), English rugby union player
- Rochelle Constantine, New Zealand marine biologist
- Rochelle Costi (1961–2022), Brazilian photographer
- Rochelle Diamond (born 1951), American research biologist and queer activist
- Rochelle C. Dreyfuss, American attorney
- Rochelle Feinstein (born 1947), American visual artist
- Rochelle Forde (born 1974), Saint Vincent and the Grenadines lawyer and politician
- Rochelle Gadd, British actress
- Rochelle Galindo, American politician
- Rochelle Mercedes Garza (born 1984/1985), American lawyer and legal scholar
- Rochelle Gilmore (born 1981), Australian racing cyclist
- Rochelle Goldberg (born 1984), Canadian artist
- Rochelle Gutierrez, American professor of education
- Rochelle Hudson (1916-1972), American actress
- Rochelle Humes (born 1989), British singer
- Rochelle Huppin, American chef
- Rochelle Jones (1945–2006), American journalist
- Rochelle Jordan, Canadian singer
- Rochelle Majer Krich (born 1947), German writer
- Rochelle Lazarus (born 1947), American businesswoman
- Rochelle Lefkowitz, American activist
- Rochelle Lieber, American professor of English
- Rochelle Loewen (born 1979), American model
- Rochelle Low (born 1969), Canadian field hockey player
- Rochelle Martin (born 1973), New Zealand rugby union player
- Rochelle Martinez, American government statistician
- Rochelle Neil, English actress
- Rochelle Newman, American psychologist
- Rochelle Nguyen, American politician and attorney
- Rochelle Oliver (born 1937), American actress
- Rochelle Owens (born 1936), American poet and playwright
- Rochelle Pangilinan (born 1982) Filipina artist
- Rochelle Perts (born 1992), Dutch singer
- Rochelle Potkar (born 1979), Indian fiction writer
- Rochelle Rackham (born 1969), English television personality
- Rochelle Rao (born 1988), Indian model and actress
- Rochelle Riley, Director of Arts and Culture for the City of Detroit
- Rochelle Rodgers (born 1987), Australian athlete
- Rochelle Saidel, American writer and researcher
- Rochelle Saunders (born 1975), New Zealand rower
- Rochelle Sharpe, American journalist
- Rochelle Lee Shoretz (1972–2015), American lawyer
- Rochelle Slovin, American actress
- Rochelle Stevens (born 1966), Olympic gold medalist
- Rochelle Tamarua, New Zealand rugby league referee
- Rochelle Walters (born 2000), English karateka
- Rochelle Walton Gray, American politician
- Rochelle Watson, Australian singer
- Rochelle Walensky, American medical scientist

== Fictional characters ==
- Rochelle (Everybody Hates Chris), a character from the television series Everybody Hates Chris
- Rochelle, a playable character in Left 4 Dead 2
- Rochelle, a character in the 2013 DisneyToon Studios animated film Planes
- Rochelle Goyle, a character in Monster High
- Rochelle "Roch" Mason, a lead character in the BBC series Red Rose
- Doubly fictional titular character in a fictional movie Rochelle, Rochelle in several episodes of Seinfeld
