= Queering =

Challenging heteronormativity in academic and other contexts

Queering (also called queer reading) is a technique used to challenge heteronormativity by analyzing places in a text that use heterosexuality or identity binaries. Coming out of queer theory in the late 1980s through the 1990s, queering is a method that can be applied to literature, film, and other media. Originally, the method of queering dealt more strictly with gender and sexuality, but quickly expanded to become more of an umbrella term for addressing identity as well as a range of systems of oppression and identity politics. Even the term queer itself can be queered, because much of queer theory involves working to fight against normalization even in the field itself. In the context of queer theory, "queering is something we do, rather than something we are (or are not)."

== Origins and other uses ==
Historically, queer was a word that referred to something as odd or strange. As the verb form of queer, queering can refer to the act of taking something and looking at it through a lens that makes it strange or troubles it in some way. By the 1940s (in the United States), queer came to be used in reference to sexuality that deviated from heterosexual norms. It was in the period of the late 1980s and early 1990s when LGBT AIDS activist groups, such as Act Up and Queer Nation, began to reclaim the term queer as a positive identifier and as a process of questioning mainstream ideas about what was considered normal. Cathy Cohen argues that groups like these also extended the use of queer to move past “assimilationist tendencies" present in AIDS activism. This is based on sentiments expressed by groups like Queer Nation who felt that queer as a word and a sentiment was too focused on assimilation of non-normative sexualities and identities. Within such groups, queer as a noun was reclaimed again to mean something radical. Queering then became a tool for social and political subversion of dominant culture. Because it is rooted in queer theory, it is also closely tied into queer politics and queer activism.

Because the idea of queering comes from the term queer, it has a wide variety of definitions as well as uses. For example, Eve Kosofsky Sedgwick, a foundational theorist of queer theory says that queer can mean "the open mesh of possibilities, gaps…and excesses of meaning when the constituent elements of anyone’s gender, of anyone’s sexuality aren't made (or can't be made) to signify monolithically." Literary critic Michael Warner offers this definition: "Queer gets a critical edge by defining itself against the normal rather than the heterosexual." Judith Butler, another theorist credited with the founding of queer theory, talks about queer as being an act that can be performed. In a more current context, methods of queering extend beyond critiquing literature to examine topics from popular culture to more abstract topics like theology and time. In her essay about the benefits of queering theology, Thelathia "Nikki" Young, says that queering is a way to "[deconstruct] the logics and frameworks operating within old and new theological and ethical concepts." In addition to these deconstructions, she argues that queering "dismantles the dynamics of power and privilege persisting among diverse subjectivities."

=== Uses in literature ===
In Pia Livia Hekanaho's essay "Queering Catcher: Flits, Straights, and Other Morons," she uses queering to analyze “the leaking boundaries of 'straight' (heterosexual) masculinity and the queer identities that may lie beyond those boundaries” in J.D. Salinger's 1951 novel Catcher in the Rye. In it, she looks at how the narrator Holden Caufield is caught between the strictness of normative masculinity and a fear of non-normative sexualities and manhood. Judith Butler uses a queer reading of the 1929 novel Passing by Nella Larson to see the possibilities of blurring the binaries of both race and attraction.

Genre literature such as fantasy and science fiction also remain popular texts for queer analysis. In Anna Bark Persson's article "Home and Hell: Representation of Female Masculinity in Action-Driven Science Fiction Literature," she explores the narratives of characters Nyxnissa so Dasheem from the series The Bel Dame Apocrypha by Kameron Hurley and Catherine Li from the series The Spin Trilogy by Robert Charles Wilson. Persson examines their roles as masculine women who take up space and hold positions of power, and how their science fiction settings are used to reject cis and hetero-normative conventions.

=== Uses in design ===
There is a growing movement to queer design seen in initiatives like Queering the Map and work by designers and design researchers like Ece Canli, Emeline Brulé, Luiza Prado de O. Martins and Tiphaine Kazi-Tani. Isabel Prochner wrote that queerness and queer theory have radical, chaotic, and deconstructive potential in design by "engaging critically with design goals, challenging their assumptions, and encouraging greater multiplicity."
