= Rochelle (surname) =

Rochelle is a surname. Notable people with the surname include:

- Alexandra Rochelle (born 1983), French former volleyball player
- Claire Rochelle (1908–1981), American actress
- Fred Rochelle (c. 1885–1901), African-American teenage lynching victim
- Kara Rochelle (born 1983), American politician
- Karyn Rochelle, American country music singer/songwriter
- Kathleen Rochelle (fl. 1926–1932), American politician
- Michael Rochelle (born 1950), retired United States Army lieutenant general
- Rashad Rochelle (born 2003), American football player
- Robert Rochelle (born 1945), American lawyer and former politician
