= Lucas LaRochelle =

Canadian artist and designer

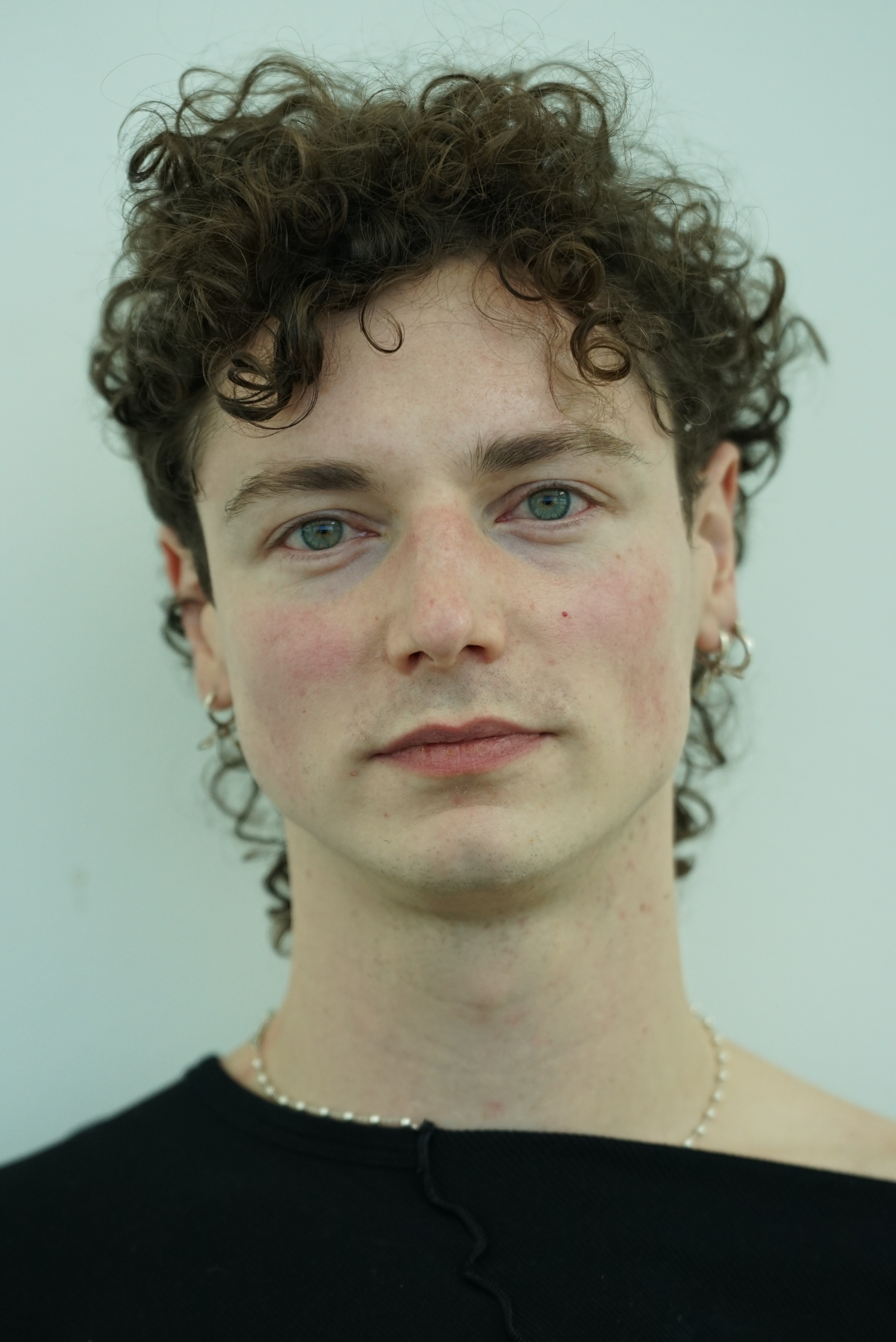
LaRochelle in 2025

Lucas LaRochelle is a Canadian artist and designer based in Montreal, Quebec. They are best known as the creator of the community-based online collaborative mapping platform Queering the Map.

== Early life and education ==
LaRochelle grew up in Ontario. In 2016, they received a certificate in co-design from HU University of Applied Sciences Utrecht. In 2020, LaRochelle received a Bachelor of Fine Arts in Design and Computation Arts from Concordia University.

== Work ==
LaRochelle's artistic work primarily explores internet cultures, community archives, internet studies, artificial intelligence and queer geography.

They have exhibited and lectured widely, including at the Guggenheim Museum, Ars Electronica, the Museum of Design Atlanta, Mozilla Festival, the Phi Centre, Stanford University, and the University of Cambridge.

== Queering the Map ==
In May 2017, LaRochelle launched the community-based collaborative mapping platform Queering the Map, on which users submit their personal queer experiences to specific locations on a single collective map. LaRochelle has cited the lasting impact of personal memories on their perceptions towards places and Sara Ahmed's ideas on queerness as an orientation towards space as influences behind the project. In February 2018, a cyberattack generating pins with comments in support of U.S. president Donald Trump forced LaRochelle to take down the site, relaunching it in April 2018. Since its inception, users have contributed over 500,000 submissions in 23 languages to the platform.

In 2018, LaRochelle received an honorary mention at the Prix Ars Electronica and was longlisted for the Kantar Information is Beautiful Awards and the Lumen Prize for Digital Art for their work on Queering the Map. They have given numerous lectures and workshops on and around the project in Canada, the Netherlands, Puerto Rico, Switzerland and the United States, including at the Museum of the Moving Image in New York City, the University of Puerto Rico, Río Piedras Campus's School of Architecture in San Juan and the OTHERWISE festival in Zürich.

In 2019, LaRochelle began developing QT.bot, an artificial neural network trained to generate hypothetical queer stories using the data submitted to Queering the Map.
