= Kathleen Rochelle =

Wyoming politician

Member of the Wyoming House of Representatives from the Niobrara district
- Incumbent
- Assumed office 1932

Kathleen Rochelle was an American Democratic politician from Lusk, Wyoming. She represented the Niobrara district in the Wyoming House of Representatives in 1926 and 1932.
