= Rochelle Newman =

American psychologist

Rochelle Newman is an American psychologist. She is chair of the University of Maryland Department of Hearing and Speech Sciences (HESP), as well as associate director of the Maryland Language Science Center. She previously served as the director of graduate studies for both HESP and the Program in Neuroscience and Cognitive Science and is also a member of the Center for the Comparative & Evolutionary Biology of Hearing. Newman helped found the University of Maryland Infant & Child Studies Consortium and the University of Maryland Autism Research Consortium.

Her research focuses on speech perception and language acquisition. More specifically, she is interested in how the brain recognizes words from fluent speech, especially in the context of noise, and how this ability changes with development.

== Biography ==
Newman received her Bachelor of Science in speech from Northwestern University in 1991. She attended SUNY Buffalo for her graduate and doctoral studies, where she received her master's degree from the department of psychology in 1995 and her Ph.D. in 1997. Newman's dissertation explored differences in speech perception and production (“Individual differences and the link between speech perception and speech production”).

After working as an assistant professor in the department of psychology in the University of Iowa, Newman joined the University of Maryland Hearing and Speech Sciences Department in 2001. She currently serves as professor and chair of the Hearing and Speech Sciences Department. She is also associate director of the Maryland Language Science Center (LSC) and serves on the executive board of the Maryland Cochlear Implant Center of Excellence (MCICE) and the Graduate Field Committee in Developmental Science.

== Research ==
Newman's research focuses on listening in noise, particularly in infants and young children. She has also looked at other difficult listening conditions (such as listening through a cochlear implant, and listening to fast speech, and novel accents). Additional areas of research include bilingualism, sports-related concussions, and dog cognition.

== Notable publications ==
- Newman, R. S., Bernstein Ratner, N., Jusczyk, A. M., Jusczyk, P. W. & Dow, K. A. (2006). Infants’ early ability to segment the conversational speech signal predicts later language development: A retrospective analysis. Developmental Psychology, 42(4), 643–655.
- Newman, R. S. & Jusczyk, P. W. (1996). The cocktail party effect in infants. Perception & Psychophysics, 58 (8), 1145–1156.
- Newman, R.S. (2008). The level of detail in infants’ word learning. Current Directions in Psychological Science, 17(3), 229–232.
- Bail, A., Morini, G. & Newman, R. S. (2015). Look at the gato! Code-switching in speech to toddlers. Journal of Child Language, 42(5), 1073–1101.
- Newman, R.S., Rowe, M. & Bernstein Ratner, N. (2016). Input and uptake at 7 months predicts toddler vocabulary: The role of child-directed-speech and infant processing skills in language development. Journal of Child Language, 43(5), 1158–1173.
- Erickson, L. C. & Newman, R. S. (2017). Influences of background noise on infants and children. Current Directions in Psychological Science, 26(5), 451–457.
