= Pat Larochelle =

Canadian ice hockey player

- Born: September 26, 1891; Montreal, Quebec, Canada
- Died: October 18, 1944 (aged 53)
- Position: Goaltender
- Played for: Montreal Canadiens (NHA)
- Playing career: 1909–1912

Joseph Leopold "Pat" Larochelle (September 26, 1891 – October 18, 1944) was a Canadian professional ice hockey player. He played one game with the Montreal Canadiens of the National Hockey Association. He was the uncle of Wildor Larochelle, who also played with the Montreal Canadiens.
