= Queering the Map =

Queer experience mapping website

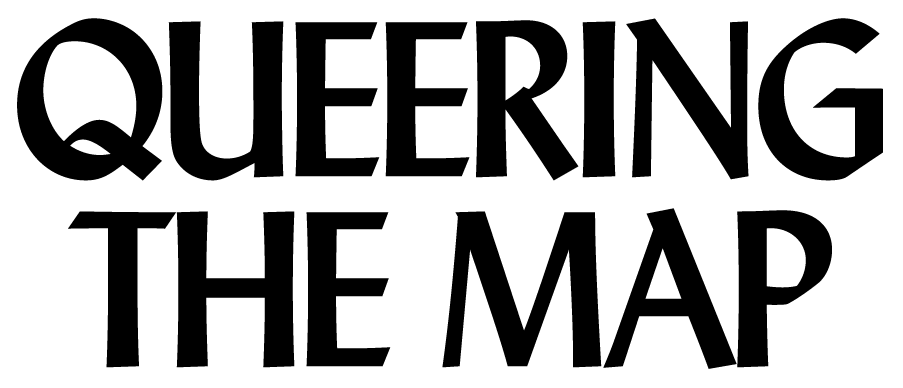
- Website type: queer mapping
- Founded: May 2017
- Country of origin: Canada
- Founder: Lucas LaRochelle
- Website: www.queeringthemap.com
- Current status: Active

Queering the Map is a community-based online collaborative and counter-mapping platform on which users submit their personal queer experiences to specific locations on a single collective map. Since its inception, users have contributed more than 500,000 posts in 23 languages to the platform.

== History ==
In 2017, Canadian artist and designer Lucas LaRochelle began working on Queering the Map for a class project at Concordia University in Montreal. The project was launched in May of the same year. LaRochelle has cited the lasting impact of personal memories on their perceptions towards places and Sara Ahmed's ideas on queerness as an orientation towards space as influences behind the project. For LaRochelle, a queer space can be a relational experience created by and/or shared between queer people. LaRochelle has stated that their main intent for initiating the project was to archive these spaces, which transcend the traditional notion of queer spaces as fixed places (like businesses or neighborhoods) that are reclaimed by clearly defined communities.

In February 2018, Montreal DJ Frankie Teardrop shared Queering the Map on Facebook, greatly increasing its visibility. During this month, the number of pins on the map increased from 600 to 6,500 within a three-day span. The same month, a cyberattack generating pins with comments in support of U.S. president Donald Trump forced LaRochelle to take down the site and ask for help on its URL. Over the next two months, 8 volunteers developed a more secure version of the site on GitHub, and the project qualified for Cloudflare's free Project Galileo cybersecurity service. Notably, a moderation system was developed for the platform through this process. In April 2018, Queering the Map was relaunched.

In 2019, LaRochelle began developing QT.bot, an artificial neural network trained to generate hypothetical queer stories using the data submitted to Queering the Map.

== Reception ==
Queering the Map has received press coverage through media outlets based in Australia, Brazil, Canada, the Czech Republic, France, Spain, Switzerland, the UK and the U.S., including Autostraddle, CBC Arts, CityNews, Condé Nast Traveler, Fugues, Numerama, Paper, rabble.ca, The McGill Daily, The Skinny, VICE, and VOGUE.

In 2023, in the midst of the Gaza war, it was reported that several pins had been dropped onto the Gaza Strip purportedly containing regretful messages from LGBTQ people living within the enclave. Several of these messages, which included individuals whose partners had died in airstrikes, as well as messages of solidarity towards LGBTQ Palestinians, went viral on social media.

=== Accolades ===
In 2018, Queering the Map received an honorary mention at the Prix Ars Electronica and was longlisted for the Kantar Information is Beautiful Awards and the Lumen Prize for Digital Art.

== Context ==
Queering The Map is becoming widely known in the design field and is part of a larger 'queer turn' in design seen in work by designers and design researchers like Ece Canli, Emeline Brulé, Luiza Prado de O. Martins and Tiphaine Kazi-Tani, which has been described as "radical, chaotic and deconstructive."
