= ESA Brive =

French football club

L'Etoile Sportive Aiglons Briviste-la-Gaillarde (The Sporting Star Eagles Briviste), commonly known as ESA Brive, is a French football club based in Brive-la-Gaillarde, who currently play in the Championnat de France Amateurs 2 Group F.

== History ==
ESA was founded in 1920 and played in the Stade André Pestourie which subsumes 3,000 places.

== Notable alumni ==
Laurent Koscielny (born 1985) played from 1995 to 1997 and 1998 to 2002
