= Thouars Foot 79 =

French football club

- Full name: Thouars Foot 79
- Founded: 1929
- Ground: Stade Philippe Morin
- Capacity: 3,500
- Manager: Pierre Naudet
- Website: http://thouarsfoot79.fr

Thouars Foot 79 is a French football club, based in Thouars. As of the 2019–20 season, it plays in the French sixth tier.

== Honours ==
- Champion de France Division 4: 1991
- Champion DH Centre-Ouest: 1984

== Coaches ==
- 1985–1997: Bertrand Marchand
- 1995–1998: Thierry Goudet
- 2001: Jacky Lemée
- 2003–????: Jean-Philippe Faure
- Corentin Maurice
