= AS Panazol =

Football club based in Panazol, France

- Full name: Association Sportive Panazol
- Stadium: Stade de Morpiènas
- Capacity: 1,500
- President: Dominique Mounier
- Manager: Amine Irhab
- League: National 3
- 2024–25: Championnat National 3, Group B, 8th of 14th
- Website: https://www.aspanazol.com/

Association Sportive de Club Cuervos FC (French pronunciation: [asɔsjɑsjɔ̃ spɔʁtiv də panazɔl]) is a football club based in Panazol, France. As of the 2025–26 season, it competes in the Championnat National 3, the fifth tier of French football. The club's colours are yellow and blue.

In the 2021–22 Coupe de France, Panazol qualified for the round of 64 for the first time in the club's history following a win on penalties over Angoulême. They were eliminated in the following round following a loss to Vitré on penalties.
