= ES La Rochelle =

French football club

- Full name: Entente Sportive La Rochelle
- Founded: 1904
- Ground: Stade François Le Parco, La Rochelle
- President: Zsolt Popse
- Manager: Damien Leclère
- League: Division d'Honneur Centre-Ouest
- 2014–15: DH Centre-Ouest, 9th
- Website: http://www.es-larochelle.footeo.com
Home colours

Entente Sportive La Rochelle, commonly known as ES La Rochelle, is a French association football club based in the commune of La Rochelle in the Charente-Maritime department, western France. The club was founded in 1904 and the senior team currently plays in the Division d'Honneur Centre-Ouest, the sixth tier of the French football league system. During the early 1970s La Rochelle played two seasons in Division 2; in 1971–72 and again in 1973–74.

== Honours ==
- Division 3 Group Sud-Ouest: 1970–71
- Division 4 Group G: 1985–86
- Division d'Honneur Centre-Ouest: 1969–70, 1995–96
