= 2020–21 Coupe de France preliminary rounds, Nouvelle-Aquitaine =

The 2020–21 Coupe de France preliminary rounds, Nouvelle-Aquitaine was the qualifying competition to decide which teams from the leagues of the Nouvelle-Aquitaine region of France took part in the main competition from the seventh round.

A total of eleven teams qualified from the Nouvelle-Aquitaine preliminary rounds. In 2019–20, Pau FC progressed furthest in the main competition, reaching the round of 16 before losing to Paris Saint-Germain 0–2.

== Schedule ==
A total of 674 teams entered from the region. The draw required a preliminary round involving 132 clubs on 23 August 2020. The remaining 488 teams from the district divisions, Régional 2 and Régional 3 entered at the first round stage on 30 August 2020. The 35 Régional 1 teams entered at the second round stage on 6 September 2020.

The third round draw, which saw the entry of the Championnat National 3 teams, was made on 15 September 2020. The fourth round draw, which saw the entry of the Championnat National 2 teams, was made on 24 September 2020. The fifth round draw was made on 8 October 2020. The sixth round draw was made on 22 October 2020.

=== Preliminary round ===
These matches were played on 22 and 23 August 2020.

Preliminary round results: Nouvelle Aquitaine
Tie no	Home team (tier)	Score	Away team (tier)
1.	Football Sud Bastide (10)	1–6	AS Pellegrue (12)
2.	Pleumartin-La Roche-Posay FC (12)	3–1	Amicale Coussay-les-Bois (11)
3.	AS Civaux (11)	7–0	Entente Nanteuil-Verteuil (12)
4.	US Oradour-sur-Glane (11)	2–0	FC Chaillac Saillat (12)
5.	ES Montignac 16 (11)	1–0	Entente Foot 16 (11)
6.	FC Rouillac (11)	1–0	US Pont l'Abbé d'Arnoult (11)
7.	FC Saint-Fraigne (11)	0–2	FC de la Soie (11)
8.	AR Cherveux (12)	0–4	AS Augé/Azay-le-Brûlé (11)
9.	SEPC Exireuil (11)	3–2	AS Sainte-Néomays Romans (12)
10.	AS Saint-Martin-lès-Melle (11)	2–0	AS Exoudun (12)
11.	FC Canton de Courçon (11)	1–3	US Champdeniers-Pamplie (11)
12.	Croutelle FC (12)	3–0 (Note: Match won through forfeit.)	AS Saint-Eloi (11)
13.	ASPTT Bessines (12)	4–1	US Chenay-Chey-Sepvret (11)
14.	CS Venise Verte (11)	3–2	US Vivonne (11)
15.	US Lambon (12)	0–8	Amicale Saint-Martin (12)
16.	SC Bédenac Laruscade (12)	4–2	AS Montguyon (11)
17.	FC Valence-en-Pitou/Couhé (13)	3–0	ES Aunac (13)
18.	AS Saint-Saviol (12)	1–2	US Abzac (11)
19.	AS Blanzay (13)	1–0	Espérance Saint-Bonnet-de-Bellac (11)
20.	CAS Bouresse (13)	0–3	AS La Jonchère-Saint-Maurice (11)
21.	JS Angoulins (11)	1–11	Avenir Autize (11)
22.	US Prahecq (12)	2–3	ASS Portugais La Rochelle (11)
23.	Entente Voulmentin-Saint-Aubin-du-Plain-La Coudre (11)	2–0	US La Chapelle-Viviers (12)
24.	SC Vouzailles (13)	0–2	US Vouillé (11)
25.	AS Saint-Christophe 86 (12)	1–3	Bel-Air Rocs OC Poitiers (11)
26.	ASA Couronneries (11)	1–1 (3–4 p)	AS Saint-Léger Montbrillais (11)
27.	ASC Portugais Parthenay et de Gâtine (11)	2–4	US Brion 79 (11)
28.	ASC Poitiers-Biard (11)	2–1	ES Saint-Amand-sur-Sèvre (11)
29.	SC L'Absie-Largeasse/Moutiers-sous-Chantmerle (11)	3–0	CDJ Pompaire (12)
30.	US Vergentonnaise (12)	2–1	FC Jardres (12)
31.	ES Vouneuil-sous-Biard (12)	4–1	AS Coulonges-Thouarsais (11)
32.	FC ASM (11)	2–3	US Leigné-sur-Usseau (11)
33.	ES Boismé Clessé (12)	1–1 (5–4 p)	FC Chiché (11)
34.	AS Colombiers (13)	4–2	US Mirebeau (11)
35.	FC Saint-Jean-Missé (11)	5–1	US Cissé (12)
36.	SC Champagné-Saint-Hilaire (12)	0–3	Diables Bleus Bersac (11)
37.	US Availles-Limouzine (14)	1–8	Fontafie FC (11)
38.	CS Chatain (12)	1–0	Entente Saint-Maurice-Gençay (14)
39.	CMS Haut-Médoc (11)	2–3	Alerte Cussacaise FC (11)
40.	Saint-Aulaye Sports (11)	1–7	AS Pugnac (10)
41.	JS Grand Champagne (11)	1–3	US Coutras (11)
42.	AS Sauveterrienne (11)	2–0	AS Beautiran FC (12)
43.	AS Morizes (11)	0–6	ES Mazères-Roaillan (11)
44.	Union Saint-Jean (11)	0–1	SC Monségur (11)
45.	US Allemans-du-Dropt (11)	1–1 (9–8 p)	SC Saint-Morillon (11)
46.	US Farguais (11)	1–3	SJ Yvrac (11)
47.	SC Astaffortais (11)	1–1 (11–10 p)	SJ Bergerac (11)
48.	RC Dax (11)	1–1 (2–4 p)	SC Taron Sévignacq (11)
49.	Arranoak FC (11)	1–2	Kanboko Izarra (11)
50.	Monein FC (11)	0–1	Entente Haut Béarn (11)
51.	FC Cubzac-les-Ponts (11)	4–0	AS Saint-Germain-Chantérac (11)
52.	AS Coursac (11)	2–6	APIS en Aquitaine (12)
53.	FC Pineuilh (11)	1–2	US Ludon (11)
54.	Stade Boisseuillais (12)	2–4	US Anais (11)
55.	Espoir Haut Vals de Saintonge (11)	2–3	ES Fléac (11)
56.	AC Gond-Pontouvre (12)	0–0 (4–5 p)	CS Trizay-Beurlay (11)
57.	FC Spartak Carsac (12)	2–1	AS Villac (12)
58.	CA Brignac (11)	2–4	FC Pays Arédien (11)
59.	AS Portugaise Sarlat (11)	2–1	APCS Mahorais Brive (11)
60.	SC Séreilhac (11)	0–1	USA Terrasson (11)
61.	FC Coly (12)	8–1	AS Glandon (13)
62.	AS Marcillac Clergoux (11)	3–2	FC Saint-Jal (11)
63.	Parempuyre FC (11)	3–1	AS Salles-d'Angles (11)
64.	Saint-Seurin JC (12)	1–2	AS Avensan-Moulis-Listrac (11)
65.	AG Vendays-Montalivet (11)	3–1	JS Abzac (11)
66.	Ciboure FC (11)	4–1	Union Saint-Maurice/Grenade (11)

=== First round ===
These matches were played on 29 and 30 August 2020, with a number postponed until 2, 5 and 6 September 2020.

First round results: Nouvelle Aquitaine
Tie no	Home team (tier)	Score	Away team (tier)
1.	FC Parentis (9)	0–8	ES Audenge (7)
2.	FC Born (9)	4–2	JS Teichoise (9)
3.	AS Facture-Biganos Boïens (8)	1–0	Biscarrosse OFC (8)
4.	Stade Ygossais (7)	3–1	Les Labourdins d'Ustaritz (8)
5.	JA Biarritz (7)	0–0 (3–4 p)	FC Belin-Béliet (8)
6.	AS Pontonx (8)	2–2 (4–5 p)	Croisés Saint-André Bayonne (7)
7.	Hasparren FC (8)	6–1	FC Morcenx-Arengosse (8)
8.	Landes Girondines FC (10)	1–7	Elan Boucalais (7)
9.	US Armagnac (11)	3–5	Papillons de Pontacq (10)
10.	FC Nérac en Albret (9)	1–5	US Portugais Pau (7)
11.	FC Casteljaloux (10)	1–4	FC des Graves (7)
12.	Fraternelle Landiras (10)	0–4	FA Morlaàs Est Béarn (7)
13.	FC Oloronais (9)	2–3	FC Roquefort Saint-Justin (9)
14.	Association Saint-Laurent Billère (9)	2–1	Langon FC (7)
15.	FC Espagnol Pau (11)	0–9	Patronage Bazadais (8)
16.	FC Lacajunte-Tursan (9)	3–1	ES Meillon-Assat-Narcastet (8)
17.	FC La Ribère (8)	2–0 (Note: Tie reversed from original draw.)	ES Bournos-Doumy-Garlède (10)
18.	Monflanquin FC (9)	2–4	Montesquieu FC (8)
19.	AS Pays de Montaigne et Gurçon (9)	2–4	FC Grand Saint-Emilionnais (7)
20.	Colayrac FC (9)	0–3 (Note: Match won by means of forfeit.)	AGJA Caudéran (10)
21.	Prigonrieux FC (7)	0–2	FC Côteaux Libournais (8)
22.	US Pays Maixentais (8)	1–2	Antran SL (8)
23.	FC Smarves Iteuil (9)	2–1	FC Vrines (9)
24.	Gati-Foot (10)	1–0	ES Oyré-Dangé (9)
25.	La Ligugéenne Football (7)	2–0	ES Saint-Cerbouillé (8)
26.	SL Cenon-sur-Vienne (11)	2–5	FC Airvo Saint-Jouin (9)
27.	US Envigne (9)	2–1	FC Pays de l'Ouin (8)
28.	US Aigrefeuille (9)	3–1	FC Boutonnais (10)
29.	Aviron Boutonnais (9)	0–1	US Frontenay-Saint-Symphorien (9)
30.	JS Sireuil (7)	3–0	AS Réthaise (7)
31.	UAS Verdille (9)	2–1	AS Andilly (10)
32.	ALFC Fontcouverte (10)	1–2	Jarnac SF (7)
33.	Saint-Porchaire-Corme Royal FC (10)	1–1 (2–4 p)	GSF Portugais Angoulême (9)
34.	La Jarrie FC (10)	3–0	AS Merpins (7)
35.	US La Crèche (10)	1–1 (4–5 p)	Capaunis ASPTT FC (8)
36.	FC Portes d'Océan 17 (9)	2–3	AS Pays Mellois (8)
37.	FC Périgny (7)	2–0	AS Puymoyen (8)
38.	Rochefort FC (7)	2–2 (3–4 p)	Stade Vouillé (8)
39.	ES Montignac 16 (11)	4–1	AS Vérines (11)
40.	AAAM Laleu-La Pallice (8)	1–2	Aunis AFC (9)
41.	AS Cabariot (8)	2–3	ES Saintes (7)
42.	ES Aunisienne Aytré (10)	0–7	Saint-Palais SF (8)
43.	Canton Aunis FC (10)	3–1	FC Nord 17 (8)
44.	US Nantiat (9)	7–0	CA Égletons (9)
45.	CA Meymac (8)	1–1 (2–4 p)	Vigenal FC Limoges (8)
46.	Avenir Nord Foot 87 (10)	1–0	ES Bénévent-Marsac (9)
47.	Limoges Football (9)	2–2 (3–0 p)	ES Ussel (9)
48.	EF Aubussonnais (8)	0–1	JS Lafarge Limoges (7)
49.	Pleumartin-La Roche-Posay FC (12)	1–1 (2–4 p)	JS Nieuil l'Espoir (8)
50.	FC Charentais L'Isle-d'Espagnac (10)	0–4	Stade Ruffec (7)
51.	USA Montbronn (10)	0–4	US Lessac (10)
52.	ACG Foot Sud 86 (10)	0–2	FC Charente Limousine (7)
53.	AS Brie (9)	12–1	US Le Dorat (10)
54.	Fontafie FC (11)	1–1 (2–1 p)	OFC Ruelle (8)
55.	AS Civaux (11)	0–1	FC Fleuré (9)
56.	FC Confolentais (9)	2–0	AS Valdivienne (10)
57.	SC Verrières (9)	3–2	US Vicq-sur-Gartempe (8)
58.	US Anais (11)	3–2	CS Saint-Angeau (10)
59.	ES Champniers (8)	1–1 (5–6 p)	FC Rouillé (9)
60.	US Oradour-sur-Glane (11)	1–1 (1–3 p)	US Leignes-sur-Fontaine (10)
61.	ES Mornac (10)	2–0	AS Lussac-les-Églises (11)
62.	FC Canton d'Oradour-sur-Vayres (10)	2–2 (4–5 p)	US Chasseneuil (10)
63.	AS Saint-Yrieix (9)	0–0 (4–3 p)	FC Pessac Alouette (7)
64.	Entente Saint-Séverin/Palluaud (10)	2–0	FC Cubzac-les-Ponts (11)
65.	CS Saint-Michel-sur-Charente (9)	1–1 (3–2 p)	SJ Macaudaise (9)
66.	CS Bussac-Forêt (9)	2–0	ES Canéjan (10)
67.	AJ Montmoreau (10)	1–6	FC Talence (7)
68.	USA Saint-Aigulin (10)	1–2	FC Martignas-Illac (8)
69.	SC Mouthiers (9)	4–1	ES Eysinaise (9)
70.	CMO Bassens (9)	3–0	Gué-de-Sénac FC (10)
71.	FC Arsac-Pian Médoc (8)	1–1 (3–1 p)	ES Ambares (8)
72.	Périgueux Foot (10)	4–6	US Saint-Clementoise (9)
73.	US Pays de Fénelon (10)	0–1	ES Nonards (8)
74.	CS Allassac (9)	0–3	FC Sarlat-Marcillac (8)
75.	ES Montignacoise (9)	0–1	Amicale Saint-Hilaire Venersal (10)
76.	Entente Perpezac Sadroc (9)	0–3	SA Sanilhacois (9)
77.	CO Coulouniex-Chamiers (9)	5–1	FC Objat (10)
78.	FC Argentat (8)	2–2 (5–4 p)	Foot Sud 87 (9)
79.	AS Chamberet (8)	0–3	AS Eymoutiers (9)
80.	FC Pays Arédien (11)	1–3	La Thibérienne (8)
81.	Peyrehorade SF (10)	4–3	Baiona FC (10)
82.	CS Lantonnais (8)	6–0	FC Barpais (9)
83.	Kanboko Izarra (11)	0–2	Labenne OSC (8)
84.	Ciboure FC (11)	0–7	AS Tarnos (8)
85.	ES Pyrénéenne (10)	2–5	JA Dax (7)
86.	Carresse Salies FC (10)	0–0 (3–2 p)	AS Lous Marous/FC Saint-Geours (10)
87.	Cazaux Olympique (9)	1–0	FREP Saint-Vincent-de-Paul (9)
88.	CA Sallois (9)	1–1 (4–5 p)	FC Saint-Martin-de-Seignanx (8)
89.	AS des Églantines de Hendaye (9)	1–1 (3–5 p)	Seignosse-Capbreton-Soustons FC (7)
90.	FC Garazi (10)	3–5	Marensin FC (10)
91.	JS Laluque-Rion (9)	3–2	SA Mauléonais (8)
92.	Ardanavy FC (11)	2–0	Chalosse FC (10)
93.	US Illats (10)	1–4	Pardies Olympique (8)
94.	AS Villandraut-Préchac (11)	3–1	FA Bourbaki Pau (9)
95.	Sud Gironde FC (10)	0–2	AS Mourenx-Bourg (9)
96.	SC Saint-Symphorien (10)	0–3	Violette Aturine (8)
97.	CA Castets-en-Dorthe (11)	1–2	AS Artix (8)
98.	ES Mazères-Roaillan (11)	0–0 (5–6 p)	Bleuets Pau (8)
99.	Entente Haut Béarn (11)	1–1 (4–5 p)	FC Pays Aurossais (8)
100.	FC Artiguelouve-Arbus-Aubertin (10)	0–0 (2–4 p)	FC Doazit (7)
101.	US Castétis-Gouze (19)	1–2	FC Hagetmautien (8)
102.	US Marsan (9)	0–0 (5–4 p)	Union Jurançonnaise (8)
103.	FC des Enclaves et du Plateau (10)	1–4	SC Saint-Pierre-du-Mont (7)
104.	ES Latrille-Saint-Agnet (10)	0–2	AL Poey-de-Lescar (7)
105.	SC Arthez Lacq Audejos (8)	3–1	SA Saint-Séverin (8)
106.	SC Taron Sévignacq (11)	0–3	ES Montoise (8)
107.	VS Caudrot (9)	2–0	Saint-Perdon Sports (9)
108.	FC Vallée de l'Ousse (9)	0–2	USV Gelosienne (8)
109.	Étoile Béarnaise FC (10)	1–2	FC Lons (8)
110.	Avenir Mourenxois (10)	3–2	FC Luy du Béarn (8)
111.	ES Nay-Vath-Vielha (9)	1–2	AS Mazères-Uzos-Rontignan (8)
112.	FC Côteaux Pécharmant (9)	0–3	FC Loubesien (9)
113.	Bouliacaise FC (11)	2–1	Pays de l'Eyraud (10)
114.	US Gontaud (9)	3–5	US Lamothe-Mongauzy (10)
115.	SC Bastidienne (9)	1–1 (3–4 p)	AS Marcellus-Cocumont (9)
116.	RC Chambéry (10)	1–0	ASSA Pays du Dropt (8)
117.	AS Lusitanos Cenon (9)	4–0	Pays de la Force-Ginestet (9)
118.	USJ Saint-Augustin Club Pyrénées Aquitaine (10)	3–1	AF Casseneuil-Pailloles-Lédat (8)
119.	CM Floirac (10)	0–3	SU Agen (8)
120.	AS Côteaux Dordogne (10)	3–0	FC Monbazillac-Sigoules (10)
121.	AS Sauveterrienne (11)	0–7	FC Pont-du-Casse-Foulayronnes (9)
122.	USC Léognan (10)	2–2 (4–5 p)	US La Catte (7)
123.	Sporting Chantecler Bordeaux Nord le Lac (8)	1–0	US Virazeil-Puymiclan (9)
124.	CA Carbon-Blanc (10)	2–5	FC Vallée du Lot (7)
125.	Targon-Soulignac FC (9)	2–4	FC Faux (9)
126.	US Allemans-du-Dropt (11)	0–2	CA Béglais (7)
127.	UFC Saint-Colomb-de-Lauzun (9)	3–0	FCC Créonnais (10)
128.	SC Astaffortais (11)	– (Note: Match abandoned with the scoreline 1–0. US Cenon Rive Droite penalised. SC Astaffortais qualify.)	US Cenon Rive Droite (8)
129.	Agen RC (10)	1–1 (3–4 p)	Stade Saint-Médardais (7)
130.	SC Monségur (11)	0–4	Confluent Football 47 (7)
131.	CS Portugais Villenave-d'Ornon (9)	4–2	Montpon-Ménesplet FC (8)
132.	AS Pellegrue (12)	2–7	US Bazeillaise (11)
133.	AS Gensac-Montcaret (8)	2–0	AS Castillonnès Cahuzac Lalande (8)
134.	RC Bordeaux Métropole (8)	4–3	AS Miramont-Lavergne (9)
135.	Mas AC (9)	0–4	FC Gradignan (10)
136.	Passage FC (10)	1–2	FC Côteaux Bordelais (8)
137.	SC Cadaujac (8)	1–0	Entente Boé Bon-Encontre (7)
138.	FC Loudun (10)	6–1	ACS Mahorais 79 (10)
139.	ES Boismé Clessé (12)	0–1	ASC Poitiers-Biard (11)
140.	Amicale Saint-Martin (12)	2–7	Ozon FC (9)
141.	ES La Pallu (11)	1–2	US Vasléenne (9)
142.	SEPC Exireuil (11)	2–2 (3–4 p)	US Thuré-Besse (10)
143.	US Brion 79 (11)	0–5	AS Mignaloux-Beauvoir (7)
144.	US Vouillé (11)	1–3	RC Parthenay Viennay (7)
145.	US Avanton (10)	0–2	ES Aubinrorthais (8)
146.	AS Colombiers (13)	0–3	ES Louzy (10)
147.	ES Trois Cités Poitiers (9)	2–1	Espérance Terves (8)
148.	SA Mauzé-Rigné (11)	0–6	FC Fontaine-le-Comte (8)
149.	US Champdeniers-Pamplie (11)	1–3	US Béruges (10)
150.	FC Clazay Bocage (11)	1–3	US Jaunay-Clan (10)
151.	US Nord Vienne (10)	1–2	SA Moncoutant (7)
152.	FC Montamisé (10)	0–2	FC Sud Gâtine (10)
153.	SC L'Absie-Largeasse/Moutiers-sous-Chantmerle (11)	1–1 (4–3 p)	Chasseneuil-Saint-Georges FC (9)
154.	AS Saint-Léger Montbrillais (11)	5–3	CL Noirlieu-Chambroutet Bressuire (11)
155.	Croutelle FC (12)	0–4	FC Chanteloup-Courlay-Chapelle (10)
156.	US Saint-Varent Pierregeay (8)	2–1	ES Nouaillé (8)
157.	ES Brion-Saint-Secondin (10)	2–3	CO Cerizay (8)
158.	ES Beaulieu-Breuil (10)	2–1	CEP Poitiers (11)
159.	Bel-Air Rocs OC Poitiers (11)	0–3	US Vrère-Saint-Léger-de-Montbrun (10)
160.	US Vergentonnaise (12)	1–3	Boivre SC (10)
161.	Avenir Autize (11)	0–1	AAS Saint-Julien-l'Ars (10)
162.	Entente Voulmentin-Saint-Aubin-du-Plain-La Coudre (11)	2–5	US Mélusine (9)
163.	US Leigné-sur-Usseau (11)	4–7	CA Saint-Aubin-le-Cloud (9)
164.	Espérance Availles-en-Châtellerault (10)	0–6	US Saint-Sauveur (7)
165.	AS Portugais Châtellerault (8)	1–1 (1–3 p)	Avenir 79 FC (9)
166.	AS Augé/Azay-le-Brûlé (11)	1–1 (2–4 p)	ES Saint-Benoit (8)
167.	Union Cernay-Saint-Genest (10)	0–2	ES Pays Thénezéen (10)
168.	Buslaurs Thireuil (10)	1–4	CS Naintré (7)
169.	ES Château-Larcher (9)	2–1	EF Le Tallud (7)
170.	FC Saint-Jean-Missé (11)	1–3	ES Beaumont-Saint-Cyr (7)
171.	ES Vouneuil-sous-Biard (12)	0–1	ES Ardin (9)
172.	Inter Bocage FC (9)	2–0	AS Sèvres-Anxaumont (10)
173.	FC Pays Argentonnais (9)	0–4	US Migné-Auxances (7)
174.	ES Fléac (11)	2–2 (3–4 p)	JS Semussac (10)
175.	SL Châteaubernard (11)	2–7	AS Saint-Christophe 17 (10)
176.	FC Haut Val de Sèvre (10)	1–6	FC Seudre Ocean (10)
177.	ASPTT Bessines (12)	2–7	AS Cozes (7)
178.	ASS Portugais La Rochelle (11)	2–0	AL Saint-Brice (10)
179.	ES Clussais (11)	0–4	EFC DB2S (8)
180.	FC Essouvert Loulay (10)	0–5	UA Niort Saint-Florent (7)
181.	FC de la Soie (11)	0–3	ASFC Vindelle (8)
182.	AS Argenteuil Angerien Poursay-Garnaud (10)	1–2	ES Celles-Verrines (8)
183.	CS Venise Verte (11)	0–2	US Marennaise (8)
184.	AS Aiffres (7)	1–1 (3–5 p)	Avenir Matha (7)
185.	ES Mougon (11)	0–2	US Aulnay (9)
186.	ACS La Rochelle (10)	1–1 (5–4 p)	CS Leroy Angoulême (7)
187.	AS Saint-Martin-lès-Melle (11)	0–6	Oléron FC (8)
188.	US Mauzé-sur-le-Mignon (10)	1–1 (2–4 p)	Breuil-Magné FC (11)
189.	CS Beauvoir-sur-Niort (10)	5–0	ES Tonnacquoise-Lussantaise (10)
190.	ES Saint Just-Luzac (9)	1–1 (6–7 p)	US Lezay (10)
191.	JS Basseau Angoulême (9)	0–2	DR Boucholeurs-Châtelaillon-Yves (10)
192.	FC Marsais (11)	1–2	FC Rouillac (11)
193.	ESAB 96 FC (10)	0–2	La Rochelle Villeneuve FC (7)
194.	CS Trizay-Beurlay (11)	0–9	FC Atlantique (10)
195.	Entente Soubise Port-des-Barques (10)	0–4	AS Maritime (8)
196.	FC Saint-Rogatien (10)	1–2	US Saujon (9)
197.	AS Reterre Fontanières (10)	0–5	AS Ambazac (9)
198.	US Vallière (10)	2–2 (4–3 p)	AS Saint-Just-le-Martel (10)
199.	ES Evaux-Budelière (10)	1–0	FC Saint-Priest-sous-Aixe (10)
200.	US Auzances (9)	1–1 (0–2 p)	AS Limoges Roussillon (8)
201.	US Felletin (8)	1–1 (3–4 p)	CA Rilhac-Rancon (7)
202.	US Saint-Vaury (9)	2–2 (2–4 p)	SA Le Palais-sur-Vienne (7)
203.	RFC Sainte-Feyre (9)	1–1 (4–5 p)	US Bessines-Morterolles (8)
204.	USC Bourganeuf (9)	1–2	USE Couzeix-Chaptelat (7)
205.	CA Peyrat-la-Nonière (9)	2–3	Amicale Franco-Portugais Limoges (7)
206.	AC Kurdes Limoges (10)	1–2	ES Marchoise (7)
207.	ES Soursac (10)	2–5	Limoges Landouge (7)
208.	AS Saint-Louis Val de l'Aurence (10)	6–0	AS Bord-Saint-Georges (10)
209.	ES Dun-Naillet (10)	0–2	US Saint-Léonard-de-Noblat (8)
210.	Creuse Avenir 2005 (9)	0–6	AS Panazol (7)
211.	SC Flayat (11)	2–7	US Versillacoise (9)
212.	JS Chambon-sur-Voueize (9)	0–1	SC Verneuil-sur-Vienne (8)
213.	Diables Bleus Bersac (11)	0–5	CS Boussac (8)
214.	AS La Jonchère-Saint-Maurice (11)	0–7	AS Gouzon (7)
215.	US Saint-Fiel (9)	2–2 (2–4 p)	AS Aixoise (7)
216.	US Beaune-les-Mines (9)	2–2 (1–2 p)	SC Sardent (9)
217.	AS Saint-Sulpice-le-Guérétois (8)	0–1	ES Beaubreuil (7)
218.	US Ma Campagne Angoulême (10)	3–4	CA Saint-Savin-Saint-Germain (7)
219.	CS Chatain (12)	0–4	FC des 2 Vallées (9)
220.	AS Blanzay (13)	1–4	Coqs Rouges Mansle (10)
221.	AS Soyaux (8)	4–1	AS Saint-Junien (8)
222.	FC Haute Charente (11)	0–2	AS Bel-Air (11)
223.	CA Saint-Victurnien (10)	1–2	Avenir Bellac-Berneuil-Saint-Junien-les-Combes (8)
224.	US Abzac (11)	0–1	Rochechouart OC (11)
225.	FC Valence-en-Pitou/Couhé (13)	0–2	Tardoire FC La Roche/Rivières (8)
226.	FC Usson-Isle (9)	3–2	FC Saint-Brice-sur-Vienne (10)
227.	ESE Charentais (10)	1–1 (3–2 p)	AS Payroux Charroux Mauprévoir (11)
228.	Valence-en-Pitou OC (10)	1–3	OC Sommières Saint-Romain (11)
229.	Tour Sportive et Merles Blancs 88 (10)	0–4	AS Taillan (8)
230.	AS Saint-Aubin-de-Médoc (10)	1–2	Union Pauillac Saint-Laurent (9)
231.	JS Douzillac Saint-Louis (10)	2–5	Coqs Rouges Bordeaux (7)
232.	AS Le Haillan (10)	1–3	CO La Couronne (8)
233.	FC Cubnezais (11)	3–1	US Châteauneuf 16 (10)
234.	AS Neuvic-Saint-Léon (10)	2–3	CA Sainte-Hélène (7)
235.	FC Montendre (9)	0–1	Union Saint-Bruno (7)
236.	SJ Yvrac (11)	2–3	FC Pays de Mareuil (8)
237.	US Coutras (11)	4–2	Clérac-Orignolles-Saint-Martin-du-Lary (9)
238.	ES Bruges (10)	1–0	ES Linars (9)
239.	AS Avensan-Moulis-Listrac (11)	2–2 (2–4 p)	AS Villebois Haute Boême (9)
240.	US Ludon (11)	0–9	Alliance Foot 3B (8)
241.	Stade Pessacais UC (10)	4–1	CA Ribéracois (8)
242.	Nersac FC (10)	1–2	AS Pugnac (10)
243.	Entente Grignols Villambard (11)	0–5	FC Saint André-de-Cubzac (7)
244.	US Nord Gironde (10)	3–4	FC Roullet-Saint-Estèphe (8)
245.	SC Bédenac Laruscade (12)	4–1	Saint-Seurin Saint-Estèphe FC (11)
246.	AS Montferrand (10)	0–2	FC Sévigné Jonzac-Saint-Germain (8)
247.	US Siant-Denis-de-Pile (10)	2–1	FC Médoc Océan (8)
248.	APIS en Aquitaine (12)	2–1	FC Médoc Côte d'Argent (7)
249.	ES Fronsadaise (9)	1–0	Andernos Sport FC (7)
250.	Alerte Cussacaise FC (11)	0–1	Saint-Médard SC (10)
251.	Parempuyre FC (11)	0–4	US Bouscataise (7)
252.	FC Lesparre Médoc (10)	1–3	RC Laurence (10)
253.	AG Vendays-Montalivet (11)	2–1	Stade Blayais (11)
254.	Bordeaux Étudiants CF (10)	1–2	FCA Moron (8)
255.	US Marsaneix Manoire (11)	0–2	ASPO Brive (8)
256.	USA Terrasson (11)	1–2	AS Beynat (8)
257.	Varetz AC (9)	1–1 (7–6 p)	FC Bassimilhacois (9)
258.	FC Atur (11)	0–2	ASV Malemort (9)
259.	US Chancelade/Marsac (9)	8–0	Cosnac FC (10)
260.	Entente Troche-Vigeois (10)	0–1	Athlético Vernois (10)
261.	ES Ussac (9)	2–4	FC Périgord Centre (8)
262.	US Tocane-Saint-Apre (10)	0–3	Entente SR3V (9)
263.	Les Aiglons Razacois (10)	2–11	US Donzenac (7)
264.	AS Meyssac (11)	0–7	US Annesse-et-Beaulieu (10)
265.	Limens JSA (8)	10–0	FREP Saint-Germain (9)
266.	AS Collonges Chauffour (11)	2–0	FC Spartak Carsac (12)
267.	Olympique Larche Lafeuillade (9)	4–0	FC Limeuil (9)
268.	FC Coly (12)	1–6	SS Sainte-Féréole (8)
269.	Condat FC (10)	1–3	Auvézère Mayne FC (9)
270.	AS Portugaise Sarlat (11)	2–2 (4–5 p)	US Lanteuil (9)
271.	AS Marcillac Clergoux (11)	1–5	AS Châteauneuf-Neuvic (8)
272.	Espoirs La Geneytouse (9)	2–2 (4–2 p)	FC Cornilois-Fortunadais (9)
273.	Boisseuil FC (10)	2–3	Tulle Football Corrèze (7)
274.	Entente des Barrages de la Xaintrie (9)	1–0	US Solignac-Le Vigen (10)
275.	Occitane FC (9)	1–2	AS Seilhac (10)
276.	AS Nexon (9)	0–1	AS Nontron-Saint-Pardoux (7)
277.	US La Roche l'Abeille (9)	1–1 (3–4 p)	FC Thenon-Limeyrat-Fossemagne (7)

=== Second round ===
These matches were played on 5, 6, 12 and 13 September 2020, with a number postponed pending outcomes from the previous round.

Second round results: Nouvelle Aquitaine
Tie no	Home team (tier)	Score	Away team (tier)
1.	AS Mazères-Uzos-Rontignan (8)	1–0	La Brède FC (6)
2.	AS Bel-Air (11)	0–2	ES Nonards (8)
3.	ES Celles-Verrines (8)	1–1 (5–4 p)	FC Chauray (6)
4.	US Marennaise (8)	1–4	ES Blanquefort (6)
5.	CA Rilhac-Rancon (7)	2–0	SC Verneuil-sur-Vienne (8)
6.	AS Marcellus-Cocumont (9)	0–1	Saint-Médard SC (10)
7.	US Envigne (9)	3–1	US Saint-Sauveur (7)
8.	JS Nieuil l'Espoir (8)	0–2	ES Ardin (9)
9.	CO Cerizay (8)	2–2 (4–3 p)	US Migné-Auxances (7)
10.	ES Saint-Benoit (8)	1–3	Inter Bocage FC (9)
11.	Gati-Foot (10)	1–1 (1–3 p)	ES Trois Cités Poitiers (9)
12.	FC Airvo Saint-Jouin (9)	1–4	ES Buxerolles (6)
13.	FC Loudun (10)	2–3	ES Aubinrorthais (8)
14.	Canton Aunis FC (10)	2–1	Avenir Matha (7)
15.	DR Boucholeurs-Châtelaillon-Yves (10)	4–1	La Jarrie FC (10)
16.	ES Montignac 16 (11)	0–5	UA Niort Saint-Florent (7)
17.	US Aulnay (9)	0–3	FC Périgny (7)
18.	US Anais (11)	1–1 (5–3 p)	AS Échiré St Gelais (6)
19.	FC Rouillé (9)	0–3	La Rochelle Villeneuve FC (7)
20.	Capaunis ASPTT FC (8)	2–0	US Aigrefeuille (9)
21.	FC Rouillac (11)	0–2	Oléron FC (8)
22.	US Bessines-Morterolles (8)	0–0 (5–3 p)	Tardoire FC La Roche/Rivières (8)
23.	ES Mornac (10)	0–8	Amicale Franco-Portugais Limoges (7)
24.	Avenir Nord Foot 87 (10)	0–5	UES Montmorillon (6)
25.	US Donzenac (7)	1–1 (3–4 p)	FC Roullet-Saint-Estèphe (8)
26.	FC Sarlat-Marcillac (8)	7–1	Entente des Barrages de la Xaintrie (9)
27.	FC Périgord Centre (8)	4–2	FC Argentat (8)
28.	Entente Saint-Séverin/Palluaud (10)	1–3	AS Saint-Pantaleon (6)
29.	FC Thenon-Limeyrat-Fossemagne (7)	1–1 (4–5 p)	ASPO Brive (8)
30.	Entente SR3V (9)	0–4	CS Saint-Michel-sur-Charente (9)
31.	Auvézère Mayne FC (9)	4–2	AS Nontron-Saint-Pardoux (7)
32.	CO Coulouniex-Chamiers (9)	2–1	ESA Brive (6)
33.	ES Montoise (8)	0–2	Élan Béarnaise Orthez (6)
34.	FC Lacajunte-Tursan (9)	0–2	FC Lescar (6)
35.	Patronage Bazadais (8)	2–0	Bleuets Pau (8)
36.	FC des Graves (7)	4–1	AS Artix (8)
37.	Hasparren FC (8)	1–2	St Paul Sport (6)
38.	FC Born (9)	1–3	Arin Luzien (6)
39.	Labenne OSC (8)	2–3	FC Martignas-Illac (8)
40.	AS Facture-Biganos Boïens (8)	2–2 (3–2 p)	FC St Médard-en-Jalles (6)
41.	CS Bussac-Forêt (9)	1–5	FCE Mérignac Arlac (6)
42.	CA Sainte-Hélène (7)	4–0	Saint-Palais SF (8)
43.	FC Sévigné Jonzac-Saint-Germain (8)	1–0	AS Lusitanos Cenon (9)
44.	FC Sud Gâtine (10)	2–3	CS Naintré (7)
45.	Boivre SC (10)	4–1	ES Beaulieu-Breuil (10)
46.	FC Fontaine-le-Comte (8)	0–0 (8–9 p)	US Saint-Varent Pierregeay (8)
47.	US Leignes-sur-Fontaine (10)	0–0 (2–4 p)	RC Parthenay Viennay (7)
48.	US Béruges (10)	1–4	FC Nueillaubiers (6)
49.	AAS Saint-Julien-l'Ars (10)	0–5	SA Moncoutant (7)
50.	SC L'Absie-Largeasse/Moutiers-sous-Chantmerle (11)	0–3	AS Mignaloux-Beauvoir (7)
51.	US Vrère-Saint-Léger-de-Montbrun (10)	1–1 (3–5 p)	US Jaunay-Clan (10)
52.	US Thuré-Besse (10)	0–11	Thouars Foot 79 (6)
53.	AS Saint-Léger Montbrillais (11)	4–1	US Vasléenne (9)
54.	ES Pays Thénezéen (10)	0–3	CA Saint-Savin-Saint-Germain (7)
55.	FC Chanteloup-Courlay-Chapelle (10)	1–1 (6–7 p)	ES Beaumont-Saint-Cyr (7)
56.	ES Louzy (10)	1–2	FC Smarves Iteuil (9)
57.	Avenir 79 FC (9)	3–3 (4–3 p)	Antran SL (8)
58.	ASC Poitiers-Biard (11)	0–6	La Ligugéenne Football (7)
59.	FC Atlantique (10)	1–5	Stade Ruffec (7)
60.	ACS La Rochelle (10)	– (Note: Match abandoned after 80 minutes, with the scoreline 1–4, due to fighting and a pitch invasion which required the police to be called. ACS La Rochelle penalised. Jarnac SF qualify.)	Jarnac SF (7)
61.	AS Saint-Christophe 17 (10)	1–2	FC Usson-Isle (9)
62.	AS Pays Mellois (8)	0–3	ES La Rochelle (6)
63.	Coqs Rouges Mansle (10)	2–7	FC Seudre Ocean (10)
64.	JS Semussac (10)	3–2	SC Verrières (9)
65.	Breuil-Magné FC (11)	1–0	US Mélusine (9)
66.	OC Sommières Saint-Romain (11)	1–4	OL Saint-Liguaire Niort (6)
67.	CS Beauvoir-sur-Niort (10)	2–1	AS Maritime (8)
68.	ES Château-Larcher (9)	1–3	SC Saint-Jean-d'Angély (6)
69.	Stade Vouillé (8)	1–1 (5–3 p)	US Frontenay-Saint-Symphorien (9)
70.	ASS Portugais La Rochelle (11)	0–3	FC Fleuré (9)
71.	EFC DB2S (8)	2–0	AS Brie (9)
72.	ASFC Vindelle (8)	1–1 (2–3 p)	JS Sireuil (7)
73.	ES Evaux-Budelière (10)	0–2	Limoges Football (9)
74.	AS Saint-Louis Val de l'Aurence (10)	3–0	SA Le Palais-sur-Vienne (7)
75.	US Nantiat (9)	1–0	Limoges Landouge (7)
76.	AS Ambazac (9)	1–0	US Saint-Léonard-de-Noblat (8)
77.	ESE Charentais (10)	0–2	CS Feytiat (6)
78.	US Vallière (10)	1–4	Avenir Bellac-Berneuil-Saint-Junien-les-Combes (8)
79.	AS Panazol (7)	1–0	FC Charente Limousine (7)
80.	US Versillacoise (9)	0–8	JS Lafarge Limoges (7)
81.	AS Eymoutiers (9)	0–2	AS Aixoise (7)
82.	AS Limoges Roussillon (8)	2–1	FC Confolentais (9)
83.	US Lessac (10)	2–5	AS Châteauneuf-Neuvic (8)
84.	Rochechouart OC (11)	0–3	ES Guérétoise (6)
85.	GSF Portugais Angoulême (9)	3–0 (Note: Tie won by means of forfeit.)	AS Seilhac (10)
86.	ASV Malemort (9)	1–2	ES Boulazac (6)
87.	AS Collonges Chauffour (11)	0–7	SA Sanilhacois (9)
88.	US Lanteuil (9)	0–3	AS Soyaux (8)
89.	US Chancelade/Marsac (9)	1–0	Varetz AC (9)
90.	AS Villebois Haute Boême (9)	2–4	SS Sainte-Féréole (8)
91.	FC Pays de Mareuil (8)	2–3	Olympique Larche Lafeuillade (9)
92.	La Thibérienne (8)	2–2 (4–3 p)	US Saint-Clementoise (9)
93.	Amicale Saint-Hilaire Venersal (10)	0–5	Limens JSA (8)
94.	Athlético Vernois (10)	0–2	Tulle Football Corrèze (7)
95.	US Annesse-et-Beaulieu (10)	1–1 (4–5 p)	AS Beynat (8)
96.	Montesquieu FC (8)	0–1	Association Saint-Laurent Billère (9)
97.	FC Pays Aurossais (8)	0–2	FC Lons (8)
98.	AL Poey-de-Lescar (7)	3–1	FC Doazit (7)
99.	FC Hagetmautien (8)	1–0	FA Morlaàs Est Béarn (7)
100.	AS Villandraut-Préchac (11)	0–3	Papillons de Pontacq (10)
101.	SC Saint-Pierre-du-Mont (7)	4–1	FC La Ribère (8)
102.	USV Gelosienne (8)	0–3	SC Cadaujac (8)
103.	AS Mourenx-Bourg (9)	2–3	Stade Saint-Médardais (7)
104.	AS Tarnos (8)	2–6	SA Mérignac (6)
105.	JS Laluque-Rion (9)	1–4	SAG Cestas (6)
106.	Marensin FC (10)	1–7	FC Bassin d'Arcachon (6)
107.	FC Gradignan (10)	0–7	JA Dax (7)
108.	Coqs Rouges Bordeaux (7)	0–4	FC Talence (7)
109.	US Lezay (10)	1–7	ES Saintes (7)
110.	AG Vendays-Montalivet (11)	0–2	Royan Vaux AFC (6)
111.	SC Bédenac Laruscade (12)	1–4	FC Arsac-Pian Médoc (8)
112.	AS Cozes (7)	3–3 (5–6 p)	FC Estuaire Haute Gironde (6)
113.	AS Taillan (8)	2–5	US Saujon (9)
114.	RC Laurence (10)	1–3	FC Côteaux Libournais (8)
115.	UFC Saint-Colomb-de-Lauzun (9)	0–8	FC des Portes de l'Entre-Deux-Mers (6)
116.	Confluent Football 47 (7)	1–1 (4–5 p)	RC Bordeaux Métropole (8)
117.	AS Côteaux Dordogne (10)	1–3	FC Grand Saint-Emilionnais (7)
118.	CS Portugais Villenave-d'Ornon (9)	0–5	US Mussidan-Saint Medard (6)
119.	FC Pont-du-Casse-Foulayronnes (9)	0–0 (2–4 p)	FC Loubesien (9)
120.	USJ Saint-Augustin Club Pyrénées Aquitaine (10)	4–4 (3–4 p)	FC Vallée du Lot (7)
121.	FC Faux (9)	2–1	RC Chambéry (10)
122.	US Bazeillaise (11)	0–4	Jeunesse Villenave (6)
123.	US La Catte (7)	5–0	Sporting Chantecler Bordeaux Nord le Lac (8)
124.	FC Cubnezais (11)	2–0	APIS en Aquitaine (12)
125.	CA Saint-Aubin-le-Cloud (9)	0–6	Ozon FC (9)
126.	FC des 2 Vallées (9)	0–3	Vigenal FC Limoges (8)
127.	SC Sardent (9)	0–3	USE Couzeix-Chaptelat (7)
128.	AS Gouzon (7)	2–2 (4–3 p)	JA Isle (6)
129.	SC Astaffortais (11)	0–3	FC Roquefort Saint-Justin (9)
130.	Pardies Olympique (8)	1–1 (4–3 p)	Stade Ygossais (7)
131.	Avenir Mourenxois (10)	2–4	US Marsan (9)
132.	Ardanavy FC (11)	0–6	Croisés Saint-André Bayonne (7)
133.	Peyrehorade SF (10)	1–1 (3–4 p)	Hiriburuko Ainhara (6)
134.	FC Belin-Béliet (8)	3–1	ES Audenge (7)
135.	AGJA Caudéran (10)	2–5	ES Fronsadaise (9)
136.	FC Saint-Martin-de-Seignanx (8)	1–5	CS Lantonnais (8)
137.	SC Mouthiers (9)	2–0	FC Saint André-de-Cubzac (7)
138.	ES Bruges (10)	2–1	Alliance Foot 3B (8)
139.	CO La Couronne (8)	2–2 (14–13 p)	US Lormont (6)
140.	Union Pauillac Saint-Laurent (9)	0–3	US Bouscataise (7)
141.	'US Coutras (11)	6–0	Stade Pessacais UC (10)
142.	US Siant-Denis-de-Pile (10)	1–1 (4–5 p)	AS Gensac-Montcaret (8)
143.	US Lamothe-Mongauzy (10)	1–2	CA Béglais (7)
144.	FC Marmande 47 (6)	– (Note: Tie reversed from original draw.) (Note: Match abandoned after 75 minutes, with the scoreline 5–0, after FC Côteaux Bordelais were reduced to 7 players (they had started the game with only 8 players due to COVID-19 cases). FC Côteaux Bordelais penalised, FC Marmande 47 qualify.)	FC Côteaux Bordelais (8)
145.	CMO Bassens (9)	0–1	FC Mascaret (6)
146.	Bouliacaise FC (11)	1–5	SU Agen (8)
147.	AS Pugnac (10)	1–6	Union Saint-Bruno (7)
148.	Cazaux Olympique (9)	0–3	Elan Boucalais (7)
149.	Carresse Salies FC (10)	0–4	Seignosse-Capbreton-Soustons FC (7)
150.	Aunis AFC (9)	6–1	UAS Verdille (9)
151.	Fontafie FC (11)	1–2	Espoirs La Geneytouse (9)
152.	US Chasseneuil (10)	3–5	ES Marchoise (7)
153.	CS Boussac (8)	1–7	ES Beaubreuil (7)
154.	Violette Aturine (8)	2–2 (4–5 p)	US Portugais Pau (7)
155.	VS Caudrot (9)	1–1 (3–0 p)	SC Arthez Lacq Audejos (8)
156.	FCA Moron (8)	4–1	AS Saint-Yrieix (9)

=== Third round ===
These matches were played on 19 and 20 September 2020.

Third round results: Nouvelle Aquitaine
Tie no	Home team (tier)	Score	Away team (tier)
1.	Saint-Médard SC (10)	1–0	SU Agen (8)
2.	CA Béglais (7)	0–4	FCE Mérignac Arlac (6)
3.	FC Smarves Iteuil (9)	1–6	RC Parthenay Viennay (7)
4.	Union Saint-Bruno (7)	3–1	SA Mérignac (6)
5.	SC Mouthiers (9)	0–5	US Lège Cap Ferret (5)
6.	CS Saint-Michel-sur-Charente (9)	2–6	CA Sainte-Hélène (7)
7.	US Saujon (9)	0–2	Stade Bordelais (5)
8.	JS Sireuil (7)	1–1 (5–6 p)	FC Arsac-Pian Médoc (8)
9.	Canton Aunis FC (10)	0–6	AS Soyaux (8)
10.	DR Boucholeurs-Châtelaillon-Yves (10)	1–4	Stade Vouillé (8)
11.	ES La Rochelle (6)	4–1	UA Niort Saint-Florent (7)
12.	CS Naintré (7)	0–0 (4–5 p)	FC Nueillaubiers (6)
13.	FC Périgny (7)	2–1	Jarnac SF (7)
14.	US Anais (11)	1–4	Capaunis ASPTT FC (8)
15.	ES Celles-Verrines (8)	0–2	SC Saint-Jean-d'Angély (6)
16.	Oléron FC (8)	0–1	GSF Portugais Angoulême (9)
17.	La Ligugéenne Football (7)	3–1	AS Mignaloux-Beauvoir (7)
18.	US Envigne (9)	0–6	CA Neuville (5)
19.	ES Ardin (9)	3–0	Ozon FC (9)
20.	Aunis AFC (9)	3–2	Stade Ruffec (7)
21.	FC Martignas-Illac (8)	0–1	FC Estuaire Haute Gironde (6)
22.	US Bessines-Morterolles (8)	1–3	ES Guérétoise (6)
23.	FC Périgord Centre (8)	1–2	FC Libourne (5)
24.	FC Lescar (6)	2–2 (6–5 p)	SC Saint-Pierre-du-Mont (7)
25.	Arin Luzien (6)	2–2 (4–2 p)	Seignosse-Capbreton-Soustons FC (7)
26.	VS Caudrot (9)	1–2	Elan Boucalais (7)
27.	Hiriburuko Ainhara (6)	1–4	FC des Graves (7)
28.	Croisés Saint-André Bayonne (7)	5–2	Patronage Bazadais (8)
29.	St Paul Sport (6)	1–3	Aviron Bayonnais FC (5)
30.	Association Saint-Laurent Billère (9)	3–2	FC Roquefort Saint-Justin (9)
31.	Jeunesse Villenave (6)	5–1	FC Vallée du Lot (7)
32.	CO Coulouniex-Chamiers (9)	1–2	FC Mascaret (6)
33.	ES Marchoise (7)	2–3	CA Rilhac-Rancon (7)
34.	Avenir Bellac-Berneuil-Saint-Junien-les-Combes (8)	0–7	US Chauvigny (5)
35.	UES Montmorillon (6)	2–1	Amicale Franco-Portugais Limoges (7)
36.	AS Aixoise (7)	1–0	ES Nonards (8)
37.	Limoges Football (9)	2–0	Auvézère Mayne FC (9)
38.	Tulle Football Corrèze (7)	5–0	Vigenal FC Limoges (8)
39.	AS Châteauneuf-Neuvic (8)	1–1 (3–4 p)	La Thibérienne (8)
40.	JS Lafarge Limoges (7)	1–1 (5–4 p)	AS Beynat (8)
41.	FC Roullet-Saint-Estèphe (8)	1–3	US Bouscataise (7)
42.	ES Blanquefort (6)	2–3	ES Saintes (7)
43.	FC Talence (7)	3–0	FC Sévigné Jonzac-Saint-Germain (8)
44.	FC Seudre Ocean (10)	2–2 (2–4 p)	FCA Moron (8)
45.	JS Semussac (10)	0–1	RC Bordeaux Métropole (8)
46.	ES Bruges (10)	2–1	CO La Couronne (8)
47.	FC Fleuré (9)	0–3	USE Couzeix-Chaptelat (7)
48.	FC Usson-Isle (9)	4–3	US Nantiat (9)
49.	ES Beaubreuil (7)	0–1	AS Gouzon (7)
50.	AS Ambazac (9)	1–4	CA Saint-Savin-Saint-Germain (7)
51.	FC Cubnezais (11)	1–3	Royan Vaux AFC (6)
52.	EFC DB2S (8)	0–3	OL Saint-Liguaire Niort (6)
53.	Inter Bocage FC (9)	1–3	ES Buxerolles (6)
54.	AS Saint-Léger Montbrillais (11)	0–5	SA Moncoutant (7)
55.	Boivre SC (10)	0–8	Thouars Foot 79 (6)
56.	ES Trois Cités Poitiers (9)	4–2	CO Cerizay (8)
57.	Avenir 79 FC (9)	0–1	SO Châtellerault (5)
58.	US Jaunay-Clan (10)	1–0	ES Aubinrorthais (8)
59.	ES Beaumont-Saint-Cyr (7)	0–2	FC Bressuire (5)
60.	CS Beauvoir-sur-Niort (10)	0–1	La Rochelle Villeneuve FC (7)
61.	Breuil-Magné FC (11)	0–3	UA Cognac (5)
62.	US Saint-Varent Pierregeay (8)	0–6	Stade Poitevin FC (5)
63.	Olympique Larche Lafeuillade (9)	0–3 (Note: Tie won by means of forfeit.)	CS Feytiat (6)
64.	AS Panazol (7)	3–0	FC Sarlat-Marcillac (8)
65.	CS Lantonnais (8)	3–1	Élan Béarnaise Orthez (6)
66.	FC Lons (8)	0–3	FC des Portes de l'Entre-Deux-Mers (6)
67.	Pardies Olympique (8)	0–4	SAG Cestas (6)
68.	US Portugais Pau (7)	2–3	AS Facture-Biganos Boïens (8)
69.	AS Mazères-Uzos-Rontignan (8)	5–2	FC Tartas Saint-Yaguen (5)
70.	FC Hagetmautien (8)	1–2	FC Marmande 47 (6)
71.	Papillons de Pontacq (10)	1–7	JA Dax (7)
72.	Stade Saint-Médardais (7)	0–2	Genêts Anglet (5)
73.	US Marsan (9)	0–1	AL Poey-de-Lescar (7)
74.	FC Côteaux Libournais (8)	2–2 (4–5 p)	US Mussidan-Saint Medard (6)
75.	AS Saint-Louis Val de l'Aurence (10)	2–3	SS Sainte-Féréole (8)
76.	ASPO Brive (8)	0–0 (1–3 p)	Espoirs La Geneytouse (9)
77.	AS Limoges Roussillon (8)	0–2	AS Saint-Pantaleon (6)
78.	ES Fronsadaise (9)	1–3	FC Faux (9)
79.	Limens JSA (8)	3–1	FC Loubesien (9)
80.	SC Cadaujac (8)	1–1 (3–5 p)	ES Boulazac (6)
81.	US Coutras (11)	2–0	US Chancelade/Marsac (9)
82.	AS Gensac-Montcaret (8)	7–0	US La Catte (7)
83.	SA Sanilhacois (9)	1–1 (4–3 p)	FC Grand Saint-Emilionnais (7)
84.	FC Belin-Béliet (8)	1–1 (5–4 p)	FC Bassin d'Arcachon (6)

=== Fourth round ===
These matches were played on 3, 4 and 6 October, with a number postponed to 7, 10 and 11 October 2020.

Fourth round results: Nouvelle Aquitaine
Tie no	Home team (tier)	Score	Away team (tier)
1.	SS Sainte-Féréole (8)	1–3	Limoges Football (9)
2.	FC Talence (7)	0–4	US Lège Cap Ferret (5)
3.	FC Usson-Isle (9)	2–2 (9–10 p)	OL Saint-Liguaire Niort (6)
4.	US Chauvigny (5)	1–4	Angoulême-Soyaux Charente (4)
5.	Jeunesse Villenave (6)	1–0	Croisés Saint-André Bayonne (7)
6.	AS Gouzon (7)	1–1 (4–5 p)	JS Lafarge Limoges (7)
7.	US Bouscataise (7)	0–1	Stade Bordelais (5)
8.	JA Dax (7)	0–3	FC Lescar (6)
9.	La Ligugéenne Football (7)	1–1 (2–4 p)	UES Montmorillon (6)
10.	UA Cognac (5)	6–1	FC Mascaret (6)
11.	Royan Vaux AFC (6)	2–2 (6–5 p)	US Mussidan-Saint Medard (6)
12.	FC Marmande 47 (6)	0–1	Stade Montois (4)
13.	AS Facture-Biganos Boïens (8)	3–2	SAG Cestas (6)
14.	FC des Graves (7)	5–0	AS Mazères-Uzos-Rontignan (8)
15.	Genêts Anglet (5)	3–0	Arin Luzien (6)
16.	FC Arsac-Pian Médoc (8)	1–2	ES Saintes (7)
17.	FCA Moron (8)	0–1	FC des Portes de l'Entre-Deux-Mers (6)
18.	Union Saint-Bruno (7)	0–2 (Note: Tie reversed from original draw.)	CA Sainte-Hélène (7)
19.	FC Périgny (7)	0–3	FC Bressuire (5)
20.	CA Saint-Savin-Saint-Germain (7)	2–6	SO Châtellerault (5)
21.	ES Ardin (9)	1–12	CA Neuville (5)
22.	Aunis AFC (9)	1–4 (Note: Match abandoned at half-time, with the scoreline 0–0, due to floodlight failure. Replayed on 11 October 2020.)	RC Parthenay Viennay (7)
23.	Capaunis ASPTT FC (8)	0–2	Stade Poitevin FC (5)
24.	ES Guérétoise (6)	1–1 (5–6 p)	Trélissac-Antonne Périgord FC (4)
25.	USE Couzeix-Chaptelat (7)	0–1	ES Boulazac (6)
26.	CA Rilhac-Rancon (7)	2–1	La Thibérienne (8)
27.	AS Aixoise (7)	2–0	Tulle Football Corrèze (7)
28.	Saint-Médard SC (10)	1–0	US Coutras (11)
29.	FC Faux (9)	0–4	FC Libourne (5)
30.	FC Estuaire Haute Gironde (6)	2–0	AS Gensac-Montcaret (8)
31.	ES Bruges (10)	0–1	Limens JSA (8)
32.	Elan Boucalais (7)	0–3	Aviron Bayonnais FC (5)
33.	AL Poey-de-Lescar (7)	2–2 (5–6 p)	FC Belin-Béliet (8)
34.	CS Lantonnais (8)	0–0 (2–3 p)	FCE Mérignac Arlac (6)
35.	SA Sanilhacois (9)	0–9	Bergerac Périgord FC (4)
36.	AS Soyaux (8)	0–2	AS Panazol (7)
37.	AS Saint-Pantaleon (6)	0–3	CS Feytiat (6)
38.	Espoirs La Geneytouse (9)	3–0	GSF Portugais Angoulême (9)
39.	SA Moncoutant (7)	2–5	ES La Rochelle (6)
40.	US Jaunay-Clan (10)	0–3	SC Saint-Jean-d'Angély (6)
41.	FC Nueillaubiers (6)	1–4	ES Buxerolles (6)
42.	La Rochelle Villeneuve FC (7)	1–0	Thouars Foot 79 (6)
43.	Stade Vouillé (8)	5–1	ES Trois Cités Poitiers (9)
44.	RC Bordeaux Métropole (8)	1–1 (7–8 p)	Association Saint-Laurent Billère (9)

=== Fifth round ===
These matches were played on 16, 17 and 18 October.

Fifth round results: Nouvelle Aquitaine
Tie no	Home team (tier)	Score	Away team (tier)
1.	Angoulême-Soyaux Charente (4)	2–3	Trélissac-Antonne Périgord FC (4)
2.	ES Saintes (7)	0–3	CA Neuville (5)
3.	Limoges Football (9)	0–2	AS Aixoise (7)
4.	Stade Montois (4)	1–2	US Lège Cap Ferret (5)
5.	RC Parthenay Viennay (7)	1–1 (2–4 p)	Stade Poitevin FC (5)
6.	SC Saint-Jean-d'Angély (6)	2–1	La Rochelle Villeneuve FC (7)
7.	JS Lafarge Limoges (7)	1–1 (2–4 p)	ES La Rochelle (6)
8.	Stade Vouillé (8)	0–0 (2–3 p)	ES Boulazac (6)
9.	Bergerac Périgord FC (4)	1–1 (8–9 p) (Note: Tie reversed from original draw.)	FC Libourne (5)
10.	ES Buxerolles (6)	1–1 (5–4 p)	UES Montmorillon (6)
11.	CA Sainte-Hélène (7)	3–1	FC Lescar (6)
12.	FC Bressuire (5)	1–1 (4–2 p)	SO Châtellerault (5)
13.	FC des Portes de l'Entre-Deux-Mers (6)	1–1 (3–4 p)	FC des Graves (7)
14.	Aviron Bayonnais FC (5)	5–2	UA Cognac (5)
15.	AS Facture-Biganos Boïens (8)	0–1	Genêts Anglet (5)
16.	Saint-Médard SC (10)	1–5	FC Estuaire Haute Gironde (6)
17.	CS Feytiat (6)	4–2	CA Rilhac-Rancon (7)
18.	OL Saint-Liguaire Niort (6)	3–2	Royan Vaux AFC (6)
19.	Espoirs La Geneytouse (9)	1–6	AS Panazol (7)
20.	FC Belin-Béliet (8)	0–2	Association Saint-Laurent Billère (9)
21.	Limens JSA (8)	1–1 (4–2 p)	Jeunesse Villenave (6)
22.	FCE Mérignac Arlac (6)	1–1 (4–3 p)	Stade Bordelais (5)

=== Sixth round ===
These matches were played on 30 and 31 January 2021.

Sixth round results: Nouvelle Aquitaine
Tie no	Home team (tier)	Score	Away team (tier)
1.	FC Libourne (5)	7–1	SC Saint-Jean-d'Angély (6)
2.	US Lège Cap Ferret (5)	3–1	FC Bressuire (5)
3.	Association Saint-Laurent Billère (9)	1–1 (3–1 p)	FC Estuaire Haute Gironde (6)
4.	ES La Rochelle (6)	1–3	Aviron Bayonnais FC (5)
5.	FC des Graves (7)	0–0 (2–3 p)	FCE Mérignac Arlac (6)
6.	AS Aixoise (7)	0–1 (Note: ES Boulazac penalised for fielding a suspended player. AS Aixoise qualify.)	ES Boulazac (6)
7.	Genêts Anglet (5)	4–0	CS Feytiat (6)
8.	Limens JSA (8)	0–5	Stade Poitevin FC (5)
9.	ES Buxerolles (6)	1–4	Trélissac-Antonne Périgord FC (4)
10.	OL Saint-Liguaire Niort (6)	5–0	CA Sainte-Hélène (7)
11.	AS Panazol (7)	1–1 (8–7 p)	CA Neuville (5)
