= 2024–25 Coupe de France preliminary rounds, Nouvelle-Aquitaine =

The 2024–25 Coupe de France preliminary rounds, Nouvelle-Aquitaine was the qualifying competition to decide which teams from the leagues of the Nouvelle-Aquitaine region of France took part in the main competition from the seventh round.

A total of fifteen teams qualified from the Nouvelle-Aquitaine preliminary rounds, one more than the previous season.

In 2023-24, two teams from the region progressed to the Round of 32, Bergerac Périgord FC and Trélissac-Antonne Périgord FC. Both lost at home to Ligue 1 opposition by a single goal; Bergerac to Lyon and Trélissac to Brest.

== First round ==
These matches were played on 23, 24 and 25 August 2024, with one replayed on 31 August and one postponed to 1 September 2024.

First Round Results: Nouvelle Aquitaine
Tie no	Home team (Tier)	Score	Away team (Tier)
1.	AS Cazères (11)	1–2	Saint-Perdon Sports (9)
2.	US Meursac (11)	1–1 (4–5 p)	FC Roullet-Saint-Estèphe (10)
3.	US Mélusine (11)	1–5	FC Fleuré (9)
4.	ÉS Liginiac (11)	0–3	Espoirs La Geneytouse (10)
5.	ES Tonnacquoise-Lussantaise (10)	1–1 (3–1 p)	US Aigrefeuille (10)
6.	US Nantiat (11)	0–1	ES Bénévent-Marsac (9)
7.	Auvézère Mayne FC (9)	1–0	ES Portugais Brive (10)
8.	AS Chadenac Jarnac Marignac (11)	6–0	AS Soyaux (9)
9.	AS Bidache FC (11)	0–6	FC Saint-Martin-de-Seignanx (8)
10.	FC Luy de Béarn (9)	0–0 (6–7 p)	Bleuets Pau (8)
11.	FC Airvo Saint-Jouin (9)	3–0 (Note: Tie won by means of forfeit.)	Union Cernay-Saint-Genest (10)
12.	AS Ingrandes-sur-Vienne (10)	1–2	Chasseneuil-Saint-Georges FC (8)
13.	US Migné-Auxances (9)	2–1	Entente Voulmentin-Saint-Aubin-du-Plain-La Coudre (10)
14.	FC Plaine Gâtine (12)	1–4	CEP Poitiers (10)
15.	AS Pouillé-Tercé (13)	1–6	US Champdeniers-Pamplie (11)
16.	AS Valdivienne (9)	2–0	AAS Saint-Julien-l'Ars (10)
17.	SA Niort Souché (11)	3–4	US Aulnay (10)
18.	SC Saint-Jean-d'Angély (9)	0–1	Avenir Matha (8)
19.	Aviron Boutonnais (10)	1–7	ASS Portugais La Rochelle (10)
20.	ES Bramerit (11)	3–1	UC Antenne (11)
21.	FC Saint-Fraigne (11)	0–13	AS Saint-Martin-lès-Melle (11)
22.	AS Périgné (10)	1–2	Espoir Haut Vals de Saintonge (11)
23.	AS Payroux Charroux Mauprévoir (12)	0–1	US Chasseneuil (10)
24.	ES Marchoise (9)	0–0 (6–5 p)	AS Saint-Jouvent (10)
25.	US Le Dorat (10)	2–1	JS Chambon-sur-Voueize (9)
26.	Avenir Nord Foot 87 (9)	1–0	US Beaune-les-Mines (10)
27.	USA Compreignac (8)	2–0	Avenir Bellac-Berneuil-Saint-Junien-les-Combes (9)
28.	Alouette FC Rive Gauche Limoges (11)	3–1	US Saint-Fiel (9)
29.	US Fraternelle Foot Châteauponsac (11)	1–3	ES Evaux-Budelière (10)
30.	US Auzances (9)	2–0	CA Peyrat-la-Nonière (9)
31.	AS Seilhac (10)	2–1	US Felletin (10)
32.	CA Meymac (9)	3–0	AS Vitrac-Corrèze (10)
33.	Allassac Saint-Viance FC (10)	3–1 (Note: Allassac Saint-Viance FC penalised for fielding a suspended player, Varetz AC qualify.)	Varetz AC (10)
34.	CA Brantômois (10)	1–5	FC Argentat (8)
35.	Entente Perpezac Sadroc (10)	6–2	US Pays de Fénelon (10)
36.	USA Terrasson (11)	3–4	ES Montignacoise (11)
37.	Beynat Lanteuil FC (9)	2–1	Foot Sud 87 (10)
38.	Périgueux Foot (9)	3–0	AS Coursac (10)
39.	ES Nonards Altillac (9)	3–1	FC Périgord Centre (9)
40.	AS Brie (9)	0–5	Royan Vaux AFC (8)
41.	US Marennaise (9)	1–3	FC Seudre Océan (9)
42.	ES Montignac 16 (11)	0–2	FC Charentais L'Isle-d'Espagnac (11)
43.	US Saint-Genis (11)	2–3	Entente Saint-Séverin/Palluaud (10)
44.	US La Gémoze (9)	8–0	US Saujon (10)
45.	ES Thénacaise (10)	6–0	AS Merpins (10)
46.	US Anais (11)	0–6	JS Basseau Angoulême (8)
47.	ES Mornac (10)	3–3 (3–4 p)	AS Claix-Blanzac (11)
48.	SC Mouthiers (8)	1–1 (3–2 p)	CS Saint-Michel-sur-Charente (9)
49.	US Bandiat (11)	0–1	US Pons (10)
50.	AS Bel-Air (10)	3–2	CA Ribéracois (8)
51.	US Saint-Vincent de Connezac (11)	0–3	FC Cubnezais (11)
52.	Union Saint-Jean (9)	0–5	FC Côteaux Libournais (9)
53.	Athletic Saint-Antoine Le Pizou (11)	0–7	Athletic 89 FC (9)
54.	AC Sud Saintonge (11)	0–11	AGJA Caudéran (9)
55.	US Fargues Toulenne (10)	1–2	US Virazeil-Puymiclan (9)
56.	AS Villandraut-Préchac (11)	1–3	AS Marcellus-Cocumont (10)
57.	Football Sud Bastide (10)	3–2	AS Sauveterrienne (11)
58.	FC Beaupuy Castelnau (11)	0–9	Confluent Football 47 (8)
59.	Lamontjoie FC (10)	2–4	US Bazeillaise (11)
60.	Monflanquin FC (10)	2–2 (5–4 p)	AS Passage FC (9)
61.	Pessac FC (10)	2–1	AS Saint-Aubin-de-Médoc (10)
62.	FC Barpais (10)	1–3	RC Bordeaux (8)
63.	JA Dax (9)	2–2 (4–3 p)	Chalosse FC (10)
64.	AS Pontonx (10)	1–2	Les Labourdins d'Ustaritz (8)
65.	ES Meillon-Assat-Narcastet (8)	2–1	Violette Aturine (9)
66.	FC Espagnol Pau (11)	0–8	Élan Béarnaise Orthez (9)
67.	FC Roquefort Saint-Justin (9)	2–2 (8–7 p)	Association Saint-Laurent Billère (9)
68.	FC Lacajunte-Tursan (9)	2–3	FA Bourbaki Pau (10)
69.	AS Colombiers (11)	2–3	ES Beaulieu-Breuil (10)
70.	Biard FC (11)	0–4	ES Saint-Cerbouillé (9)
71.	AS Saint-Léger Montbrillais (11)	0–8	CO Cerizay (8)
72.	ES Fayenoirterre (11)	5–4	Boivre SC (11)
73.	ES La Pallu (10)	4–2	ES Boismé Clessé (11)
74.	SA Mauzé-Rigné (12)	1–0	SL Cenon-sur-Vienne (11)
75.	Amicale Coussay-les-Bois (11)	1–0	US Saint-Varent Pierregeay (9)
76.	AS Sèvres-Anxaumont (11)	3–1	Buslaurs Thireuil (11)
77.	ES Châtillon Pompaire (11)	0–12	FC Chanteloup-Courlay-Chapelle (9)
78.	US Thuré-Besse (10)	0–2	FC Montamisé (9)
79.	US Avanton (11)	0–7	CA Saint-Aubin-le-Cloud (9)
80.	AS Breuil-Bernard (12)	1–4	AS Portugais Cerizay (10)
81.	CS Dissay (12)	0–1	AS Coulonges-Thouarsais (11)
82.	ES Louzy (11)	6–1	FC Clazay Bocage (11)
83.	US Mirebeau (11)	2–2 (4–5 p)	US Vicq-sur-Gartempe (9)
84.	FC Pays de l'Ouin (9)	3–0	Antran SL (9)
85.	Espérance Availles-en-Châtellerault (10)	3–0	ES Saint-Amand-sur-Sèvre (11)
86.	US Jaunay-Marigny (10)	0–4	Espérance Terves (10)
87.	FC Saint-Jean-Missé (11)	0–4	ACS Mahorais 79 (12)
88.	US Coussay (11)	0–3	AS Portugais Châtellerault (9)
89.	US Leigné-sur-Usseau (11)	1–5	US Vrère-Saint-Léger-de-Montbrun (11)
90.	SC L'Absie-Largeasse/Moutiers-sous-Chantmerle (11)	0–2	ES Pays Thénezéen (11)
91.	FC Chiché (11)	1–1 (2–4 p)	ES Oyré-Dangé (10)
92.	US Brion 79 (11)	1–1 (3–1 p)	FC Loudun (12)
93.	FC Comores Bressuire (10)	0–6	Gati-Foot (8)
94.	FC Pays Argentonnais (10)	3–0	US Vouillé Latillé (11)
95.	USF Pamproux (12)	0–4	FC Vallée du Salleron (12)
96.	ES Trois Cités Poitiers (9)	4–1	Entente Saint-Maurice-Gençay (10)
97.	FC Jardres (12)	0–1	FC Smarves Iteuil (10)
98.	AS Augé/Azay-le-Brûlé (11)	1–3	ES Saint-Benoit (9)
99.	US Leignes-sur-Fontaine (11)	1–4	FC Fontaine-le-Comte (8)
100.	ASA Couronneries (11)	3–4	AR Cherveux (12)
101.	SEPC Exireuil (11)	1–2	FC Vouneuil-sous-Biard-Béruges (9)
102.	FC Haut Val de Sèvre (12)	1–2	US Vivonne (11)
103.	ÉS Bonnes (13)	1–1 (4–5 p)	US Pays Maixentais (9)
104.	AS Blanzay (13)	0–18	ES Nouaillé (8)
105.	CAS Bouresse (12)	0–3	AC Paizay-le-Sec (12)
106.	AS Poitiers Gibauderie Mahorais (11)	3–1	Valence-en-Poitou OC (11)
107.	AS Jouhet Pindray (13)	1–5	US Vasléenne (10)
108.	US Lezay (11)	1–2	FC Rouillé (10)
109.	AS Sainte-Ouenne (12)	1–5	FC Autize (8)
110.	ASPTT Bessines (11)	4–6	AS Cabariot (9)
111.	FC Nord 17 (10)	3–3 (8–9 p)	ES Brulain (11)
112.	UAS Verdille (10)	2–3	Capaunis ASPTT FC (9)
113.	ÉSB Paizay-le-Tort (13)	1–6	ACS La Rochelle (11)
114.	US Pexinoise Niort (12)	4–1	Saint-Porchaire-Corme Royal FC (11)
115.	ES Aiffres Fors Prahecq (10)	9–0	ÉS Saint-Hippolyte (11)
116.	US Frontenay-Saint-Symphorien (10)	1–3	La Jarrie FC (10)
117.	Stade Vouillé (9)	2–2 (8–7 p)	FC Boutonnais (10)
118.	US Mauzé-sur-le-Mignon (10)	2–0	ES Celles-Verrines (8)
119.	Stade Boisseuillais (12)	3–2	JS Angoulins (12)
120.	AS Aigre (10)	1–2	CS Beauvoir-sur-Niort (10)
121.	Aigondigné FC (12)	0–9	FC Pays Néo-Créchois (9)
122.	Saint-Romans-lès-Melle FC (12)	1–2	Coqs Rouges Mansle (11)
123.	Entente Soubise Port-des-Barques (11)	2–2 (5–3 p)	FC Canton de Courçon (11)
124.	FC Venise Verte (10)	2–1	Val de Boutonne Foot 79 (11)
125.	FC Essouvert Loulay (10)	0–1	FC Saint-Rogatien (11)
126.	ES Clussais (11)	0–4	Canton Aunis FC (10)
127.	Vandré FC (12)	1–12	AS Maritime (9)
128.	FC Saint-Brice-sur-Vienne (10)	1–4	AS Saint-Junien (9)
129.	SC Séreilhac (11)	3–3 (4–5 p)	US Lessac (9)
130.	Fontafie FC (11)	0–5	FC des 2 Vallées (10)
131.	CA Saint-Victurnien (10)	1–3	US Oradour-sur-Glane (10)
132.	FC Brigueuil (11)	1–7	FC Usson-Isle (9)
133.	CS Chatainais (12)	4–0	ES Élan Charentais (12)
134.	Football Cognacois Cyrien Laurentais (11)	2–1	OC Sommières Saint-Romain (12)
135.	CS Peyrilhac (11)	0–3	FC Confolentais (9)
136.	FC Saint-Maurice/Manot (12)	2–8	US Availles-Limouzine (13)
137.	US Veyrac (11)	0–1	ES Brion-Saint-Secondin (10)
138.	FC Haute Charente (11)	4–0	Rochechouart OC (11)
139.	Chabanais FC (11)	4–0	US Abzac (11)
140.	FC Fursac (10)	1–1 (3–4 p)	AS Lussac-les-Églises (11)
141.	Vigenal FC Limoges (10)	5–1 (Note: Vigenal FC Limoges penalised for fielding ineligible players, SA Le Palais-sur-Vienne qualify.)	SA Le Palais-sur-Vienne (9)
142.	FC Saint-Martin-Terressus (12)	4–0	US Grand-Bourg (11)
143.	Limoges Landouge (9)	2–0	US Saint-Vaury (10)
144.	AS Ambazac (9)	10–1	AS Saint-Sébastien Azerables (10)
145.	ÉS Jarnages Parsac (10)	1–3	ES Nieul/Saint-Gence (10)
146.	AS Lussat (11)	2–2 (2–3 p)	Diables Bleus Bersac (11)
147.	SC Flayat (10)	0–1	CO Chénérailles (10)
148.	ES Ahunoise (10)	1–1 (2–3 p)	AS Châteauneuf-Neuvic (8)
149.	FC Sauviat-sur-Vige (11)	0–2	CA Chamboulive (10)
150.	AS Eymoutiers (10)	3–0	AS Maussacoise (11)
151.	FC Saint-Jal (11)	0–3	USS Mérinchal (9)
152.	US Saint-Clementoise (10)	0–4	Red Star Club Saint-Priest-Taurion (10)
153.	ES Soursac (11)	2–7	Occitane FC (9)
154.	Entente Marquay Tamnies (10)	1–3	SS Sainte-Féréole (9)
155.	AS Champcevinel (10)	4–2	FC Cornilois-Fortunadais (9)
156.	US Marsaneix (11)	5–1	US Solignac Le Vigen (10)
157.	US Portugaise Terrasson (11)	0–12 (Note: Match abandoned after 78 due to US Portugaise Terrasson having insufficient players to continue. They were penalised, FC Pays Arédien qualify.)	FC Pays Arédien (9)
158.	FREP Saint-Germain (10)	2–2 (4–2 p)	Boisseuil FC (11)
159.	Les Aiglons Razacois (11)	7–2	AS Meyssac (11)
160.	US Jumilhacoise (11)	1–9	FC Thenon-Limeyrat-Fossemagne (9)
161.	FC Saint-Geniès (11)	0–5	FC Limeuil (9)
162.	FC Excideuil Saint-Médard (10)	0–3	Entente SR3V (8)
163.	Condat FC (11)	3–1	US La Roche l'Abeille (11)
164.	Rouffignac OC (10)	1–4	AS Nexon (10)
165.	Olympique Larche Lafeuillade (9)	3–1	JS Castellevequoise (9)
166.	ASV Malemort (9)	3–0	Entente Périgord Noir (10)
167.	FC Saint-Paul-la-Roche (12)	0–3	Amicale Saint-Hilaire Venarsal (10)
168.	US Feuillardiers (11)	2–1	FC Atur (11)
169.	ASPO Brive (10)	3–0	ES Périgord Vert (11)
170.	Cosnac FC (10)	4–3	AS Marcillac Clergoux (10)
171.	FC Saint-Cybardeaux (11)	1–1 (3–4 p)	US Bouëx (11)
172.	ASC Mayotte Angoulême (12)	1–3	FC Fontcouverte (9)
173.	US Tocane-Saint-Apre (10)	1–3	FC La Tour Mareuil Verteillac (8)
174.	GS Franco-Portugais Gond-Pontouvre (10)	0–4	Ile d’Oléron Football (9)
175.	SC Agris (11)	2–2 (4–5 p)	EFC Vallée du Coran (11)
176.	LA Genté (11)	0–5	Saint-Hilaire FC (10)
177.	Entente Foot 16 (11)	1–8	JS Grande Champagne (9)
178.	CF Crouin (11)	1–3	OFC Ruelle (9)
179.	US Balzac (12)	2–5	US Saint-Martin (11)
180.	AL Saint-Brice (10)	1–2	Nersac FC (10)
181.	ES Nercillac-Reparsac (11)	2–9	AS Puymoyen (8)
182.	AS Mosnac (12)	0–5	USA Montbron (10)
183.	JS Garat-Sers Vouzan (11)	0–3	CO La Couronne (9)
184.	AS Guitinières Nieul-le-Virouil (12)	2–10	AC Gond-Pontouvre (11)
185.	Stade Blayais (9)	8–0	SC Bédenac Laruscade (10)
186.	FC Cubzac-les-Ponts (12)	0–4	Limens JSA (8)
187.	US Saint-Denis-de-Pile (10)	2–1	AS Neuvic-Saint-Léon (9)
188.	AS Pugnac (10)	1–1 (0–3 p)	US Mussidan-Saint Medard (8)
189.	CM Floirac (10)	0–1	US Coutras (9)
190.	ES Ambares (10)	1–4	FC Estuaire Haute Gironde (8)
191.	CA Carbon-Blanc (10)	5–4	Alliance de la Dronne FC (9)
192.	FC Vallée de la Dordogne (10)	2–5	Union Saint-Médard Petit-Palais (10)
193.	US Annesse-et-Beaulieu (11)	0–3	Libourne FA 2024 (9)
194.	FC Vallée de l'Aria (11)	3–0	FC Ambès (10)
195.	APIS en Aquitaine (11)	1–2	ES Fronsadaise (9)
196.	FC Communes de Créonnais (11)	2–2 (4–5 p)	US Artiguaise (9)
197.	AS Avensan Moulis Listrac (12)	2–2 (4–5 p)	JS Teichoise (10)
198.	ES Canéjan (11)	10–0	AS Montferrandaise (11)
199.	FC Bords de Garonne (10)	3–0	Pays de La Force-Ginestet (11)
200.	SJ Bergerac (9)	2–1	FC Casteljaloux (10)
201.	FC Côteaux Pécharmant (8)	4–2	AS Pays de Montaigne et Gurçon (9)
202.	AS Castillonnès Cahuzac Lalande (11)	0–2	US La Catte (9)
203.	AS Miramont-Lavergne (9)	5–0	Pays de l'Eyraud (10)
204.	AS Laugnac (10)	2–0	FLR Le Monteil (10)
205.	FC Belvès (11)	0–3	Sud Gironde FC (8)
206.	FC Gironde La Réole (10)	2–4	FC Roquefortais (11)
207.	FC Pineuilh (12)	0–3	US Lamothe-Mongauzy (11)
208.	ES Mazères-Roaillan (11)	0–2	ASSA Pays du Dropt (9)
209.	FC Penne Saint-Sylvestre (12)	1–6	UFC Saint-Colomb-de-Lauzun (9)
210.	AS Gensac-Montcaret (9)	7–2	SC Monségur (10)
211.	SC Astaffortais (11)	2–2 (2–3 p)	FC Faux (9)
212.	US Beychevelle (12)	0–2	ES Eysinaise (8)
213.	Haillan Foot 33 (9)	1–2	Cazaux Olympique (8)
214.	US Le Temple-Le Porge (12)	0–4	Bordeaux AC (11)
215.	Montesquieu FC (10)	1–9	CS Lantonnais (9)
216.	Union Pauillac Saint-Laurent (11)	0–2	Stade Pessacais UC (9)
217.	AG Vendays-Montalivet (9)	1–1 (5–4 p)	SC Saint-Symphorien (9)
218.	CS Portugais Villenave-d'Ornon (10)	1–6	SJ Macaudaise (9)
219.	USJ Saint-Augustin Club Pyrénées Aquitaine (10)	4–2	ES Bruges (10)
220.	Union Vallée de Garonne Illats (11)	0–4	USC Léognan (10)
221.	Castelnau FC (12)	1–9	Fraternelle Landiras (10)
222.	SC Bastidienne (10)	2–4	FC Médoc Océan (8)
223.	Parempuyre FC (11)	6–0	Saint-Seurin Saint-Estèphe FC (11)
224.	FC Pierroton Cestas Toctoucau (11)	4–1	Portets FC (12)
225.	AS Beautiran FC (11)	0–12	Coqs Rouges Bordeaux (8)
226.	AS Livradaise (11)	6–3	FCO Eymet (12)
227.	CA Castets-en-Dorthe (8)	6–1 (Note: Tie reversed from original draw.)	Cours-de-Pile-Monbazillac FC (11)
228.	Bordeaux Étudiants CF (9)	2–2 (4–1 p)	CA Sallois (8)
229.	US Saint-Germain-d'Esteuil (11)	1–5	Landes Girondines FC (11)
230.	Baiona FC (10)	2–4	Labenne OSC (8)
231.	Carresse Salies FC (10)	0–1	AS des Églantines de Hendaye (10)
232.	Ardanavy FC (10)	0–5	Peyrehorade SF (9)
233.	FC Morcenx-Arengosse (10)	2–1	FC Saint-Vincent-de-Paul (9)
234.	Kanboko Izarra (11)	3–3 (2–3 p)	Marensin FC (9)
235.	JS Laluque-Rion (11)	0–2	Elan Boucalais (9)
236.	FC Saint-Geours (9)	7–0	FC Garazi (10)
237.	Espérance Oeyreluy (10)	1–4	US Saint-Palais Amikuze (10)
238.	RC Dax (11)	10–2	FC Mées (11)
239.	US Marsan (8)	5–5 (4–3 p)	JAB Pau (9)
240.	Entente Haut Béarn (11)	0–7	FC La Ribère (8)
241.	FC Artiguelouve-Arbus-Aubertin (9)	4–0	FC Vallée de l'Ousse (10)
242.	FC des Enclaves et du Plateau (10)	3–3 (7–6 p)	Pardies Olympique (9)
243.	AS Mourenx-Bourg (11)	6–0	US Arthez-d'Asson (11)
244.	Labrit Forest FC (11)	0–3	US Castétis-Gouze (9)
245.	Étoile Béarnaise FC (11)	3–3 (1–4 p)	US Armagnac (11)
246.	Stade Navarrais (12)	4–5	ES Latrilloise (11)
247.	AS Bretagne-de-Marsan (9)	1–2	SA Saint-Séverin (9)
248.	Monein FC (11)	0–1	FC Bassin Artiz Arthez Lacq (9)
249.	FC Lons (9)	1–2	FC Oloronais (8)
250.	SC Taron Sévignacq (10)	1–3	ES Bournos-Doumy-Garlède (10)
251.	CA Rilhac-Rancon (8)	4–1 (Note: Original match abandoned due to floodlight failure, and ordered to be replayed on 31 August 2024.)	US Versillacoise (9)
252.	AC Turques Limoges (10)	5–3 (Note: Original match not played due to the pitch not being marked out, and ordered to be played on 1 September 2024. AC Turques Limoges penalised for fielding a suspended player in the rescheduled match, CAPO Limoges qualify.)	CAPO Limoges (11)

== Second round ==
These matches were played on 31 August and 1 and 4 September 2024, with one replayed on 8 September 2024.

Second Round Results: Nouvelle Aquitaine
Tie no	Home team (Tier)	Score	Away team (Tier)
1.	AS Bel-Air (10)	0–1	ES Saintes (8)
2.	SA Saint-Séverin (9)	3–2	ES Bournos-Doumy-Garlède (10)
3.	FC Pays Néo-Créchois (9)	3–1	DR Boucholeurs-Châtelaillon-Yves (8)
4.	Espoir Haut Vals de Saintonge (11)	0–4	ES Nouaillé (8)
5.	FC Fontcouverte (9)	4–2	FC Sévigné Jonzac-Saint-Germain (8)
6.	ES Canéjan (11)	1–0	CA Béglais (8)
7.	USA Montbron (10)	1–3	AS Aixoise (8)
8.	Libourne FA 2024 (9)	0–4	FC Saint-Médard-en-Jalles (7)
9.	Stade Montois (7)	3–0	ES Meillon-Assat-Narcastet (8)
10.	SA Le Palais-sur-Vienne (9)	2–2 (5–6 p)	CS Boussac (8)
11.	ES Oyré-Dangé (10)	1–2	SA Moncoutant (7)
12.	Canton Aunis FC (10)	1–1 (3–5 p)	Stade Ruffec (7)
13.	US Pays Maixentais (9)	0–0 (4–3 p)	ES Aiffres Fors Prahecq (10)
14.	FC Rouillé (10)	0–0 (5–4 p)	ES Château-Larcher (8)
15.	FC Smarves Iteuil (10)	0–4	UA Niort Saint-Florent (7)
16.	US Vasléenne (10)	2–4	ASS Portugais La Rochelle (10)
17.	ES Saint-Benoit (9)	1–1 (4–5 p)	AAAM Laleu-La Pallice (8)
18.	US Vivonne (11)	1–6	AS Maritime (9)
19.	FC Autize (8)	3–0	Capaunis ASPTT FC (9)
20.	AS Valdivienne (9)	0–1	FC Charente Limousine (7)
21.	AS Saint-Junien (9)	0–0 (2–3 p)	FC 3 Vallées 86 (8)
22.	US Chasseneuil (10)	0–6	La Roche/Rivières FC Tardoire (8)
23.	ES Ussel (8)	1–2	JS Lafarge Limoges (8)
24.	EF Aubussonnais (7)	1–1 (5–6 p)	AF Portugais Limoges (7)
25.	Red Star Club Saint-Priest-Taurion (10)	0–0 (4–3 p)	USC Bourganeuf (8)
26.	FC Thenon-Limeyrat-Fossemagne (9)	3–2	SS Sainte-Féréole (9)
27.	Périgueux Foot (9)	5–3	Cosnac FC (10)
28.	US Donzenac (8)	1–0	Auvézère Mayne FC (9)
29.	FC Sarlat-Marcillac (8)	2–0	Olympique Larche Lafeuillade (9)
30.	FC Sud 17 (8)	1–4	FC Estuaire Haute Gironde (8)
31.	FC Charentais L'Isle-d'Espagnac (11)	0–0 (1–4 p)	Avenir Matha (8)
32.	FC Roullet-Saint-Estèphe (10)	4–1	US Bouëx (11)
33.	ES Bramerit (11)	2–4	AS Cabariot (9)
34.	US Aulnay (10)	1–4	UA Cognac (8)
35.	US Pons (10)	0–2	Royan Vaux AFC (8)
36.	JS Basseau Angoulême (8)	5–1	SC Mouthiers (8)
37.	SL Châteaubernard (12)	0–4	FC Seudre Océan (9)
38.	Entente Saint-Séverin/Palluaud (10)	2–1	US La Gémoze (9)
39.	AS Saint-Yrieix (7)	0–3	Jarnac SF (7)
40.	JS Grande Champagne (9)	1–3	AS Puymoyen (8)
41.	OFC Ruelle (9)	2–0	Stade Blayais (9)
42.	FCA Moron (8)	1–1 (8–7 p)	JS Sireuil (7)
43.	SA Sanilhacois (8)	3–2	FC Mascaret (8)
44.	FC Arsac-Pian Médoc (7)	2–4	RC Chambéry (8)
45.	ES Eysinaise (8)	2–0	US Bouscataise (7)
46.	FC Cœur Médoc Atlantique (7)	3–0 (Note: Tie won by means of forfeit.)	US Cenon (7)
47.	Union Saint-Médard Petit-Palais (10)	1–1 (4–2 p)	FC Côteaux Libournais (9)
48.	CO Coulouniex-Chamiers (8)	3–3 (6–5 p)	FC Pessac Alouette (7)
49.	AS Marcellus-Cocumont (10)	0–5	Stade Saint-Médardais (7)
50.	Football Sud Bastide (10)	0–2	FC Vallée du Lot (9)
51.	FC Rive Droite 33 (8)	3–1	AF Casseneuil-Pailloles-Lédat (7)
52.	Pessac FC (10)	3–0	FC Pierroton Cestas Toctoucau (11)
53.	US Gontaud (9)	0–1	Andernos Sport FC (7)
54.	SC Cadaujac (8)	1–1 (3–4 p)	CA Castets-en-Dorthe (8)
55.	JA Biarritz (7)	6–2	FC Born (8)
56.	JA Dax (9)	2–1	ES Audenge (7)
57.	US Saint-Palais Amikuze (10)	3–2	Labenne OSC (8)
58.	Stade Ygossais (7)	2–0	FC Hagetmautien (8)
59.	Bleuets Pau (8)	6–3	FC Oloronais (8)
60.	Saint-Perdon Sports (9)	2–6	AL Poey-de-Lescar (8)
61.	FC La Ribère (8)	2–0	US Portugais Pau (8)
62.	US Armagnac (11)	0–5	FC Lescar (7)
63.	Élan Béarnaise Orthez (9)	1–1 (2–3 p)	FC Bassin Artiz Arthez Lacq (9)
64.	FC Roquefort Saint-Justin (9)	0–2	US Marsan (8)
65.	FC Pays Arédien (9)	1–1 (4–2 p)	Entente Perpezac Sadroc (10)
66.	ES Marchoise (9)	0–5	ES Guérétoise (7)
67.	ES Saint-Cerbouillé (9)	2–1	US Migné-Auxances (9)
68.	ES La Pallu (10)	1–5	CO Cerizay (8)
69.	US Vicq-sur-Gartempe (9)	1–4	CA Saint-Savin-Saint-Germain (7)
70.	FC Pays Argentonnais (10)	2–3	Gati-Foot (8)
71.	AS Coulonges-Thouarsais (11)	3–4	CA Saint-Aubin-le-Cloud (9)
72.	CEP Poitiers (10)	0–6	US Saint-Sauveur (8)
73.	AS Poitiers Gibauderie Mahorais (11)	2–2 (Note: The referee abandoned the match during the penalty shootout, after a pitch invasion resulted in police intervention. AS Poitiers Gibauderie Mahorais penalised, CS Naintré qualify.)	CS Naintré (8)
74.	ES Beaulieu-Breuil (10)	1–1 (4–5 p)	Ozon FC (7)
75.	FC Chanteloup-Courlay-Chapelle (9)	1–1 (4–2 p)	FC Pays de l'Ouin (9)
76.	AC Paizay-le-Sec (12)	1–1 (4–5 p)	AS Sèvres-Anxaumont (11)
77.	Amicale Coussay-les-Bois (11)	0–3	RC Parthenay Viennay (7)
78.	ES Pays Thénezéen (11)	1–1 (7–8 p)	ES Louzy (11)
79.	FC Vrines (8)	0–0 (4–5 p)	AS Portugais Châtellerault (9)
80.	Espérance Terves (10)	1–3	FC Airvo Saint-Jouin (9)
81.	US Brion 79 (11)	0–5	ES Beaumont-Saint-Cyr (7)
82.	Chasseneuil-Saint-Georges FC (8)	1–3	EF Le Tallud (7)
83.	FC Montamisé (9)	0–4	Inter Bocage FC (8)
84.	US Vrère-Saint-Léger-de-Montbrun (11)	0–5	ES Aubinrorthais (8)
85.	AS Portugais Cerizay (10)	2–2 (4–3 p)	ES Trois Cités Poitiers (9)
86.	ACS Mahorais 79 (12)	1–1 (4–2 p)	Espérance Availles-en-Châtellerault (10)
87.	AS Pays Mellois (8)	5–5 (5–4 p)	Aunis AFC (8)
88.	FC Saint-Rogatien (11)	4–0	Coqs Rouges Mansle (11)
89.	AS Saint-Martin-lès-Melle (11)	4–1	US Pexinoise Niort (12)
90.	ACS La Rochelle (11)	2–1	Avenir 79 FC (7)
91.	US Champdeniers-Pamplie (11)	0–4	OL Saint-Liguaire Niort (7)
92.	CS Beauvoir-sur-Niort (10)	1–3	AS Échiré Saint-Gelais (8)
93.	FC Vouneuil-sous-Biard-Béruges (9)	0–6	FC Réthais (8)
94.	AS Saint-Christophe 17 (10)	3–3 (4–3 p)	FC Venise Verte (10)
95.	Stade Vouillé (9)	1–7	FC Dompierre-Sainte-Soulle (7)
96.	ES Brulain (11)	1–3	JS Nieuil l'Espoir (8)
97.	AR Cherveux (12)	2–5	FC Fontaine-le-Comte (8)
98.	CS Chatainais (12)	1–11	Étoile Maritime FC (7)
99.	Stade Boisseuillais (12)	0–9	La Ligugéenne Football (7)
100.	US Mauzé-sur-le-Mignon (10)	4–4 (4–2 p)	FC Sud Gâtine (8)
101.	La Jarrie FC (10)	2–3	AS Mignaloux-Beauvoir (8)
102.	FC Usson-Isle (9)	1–1 (4–5 p)	UES Montmorillon (7)
103.	Chabanais FC (11)	0–4	Avenir Nord Foot 87 (9)
104.	US Oradour-sur-Glane (10)	0–0 (2–4 p)	ES Brion-Saint-Secondin (10)
105.	FC Fleuré (9)	0–1	FC Confolentais (9)
106.	FC Haute Charente (11)	0–7	USE Couzeix-Chaptelat (7)
107.	ES Nieul/Saint-Gence (10)	1–3	US Bessines-Morterolles (8)
108.	Football Cognacois Cyrien Laurentais (11)	0–1	USA Compreignac (8)
109.	FC Canton d'Oradour-sur-Vayres (10)	1–2	Limoges Landouge (8)
110.	US Lessac (9)	0–2	SC Verneuil-sur-Vienne (8)
111.	US Availles-Limouzine (13)	2–7	AS Lussac-les-Églises (11)
112.	FC des 2 Vallées (10)	2–2 (2–4 p)	FC Saint-Priest-sous-Aixe (8)
113.	FC Vallée du Salleron (12)	2–1	US Le Dorat (10)
114.	ES Bénévent-Marsac (9)	4–1	US Auzances (9)
115.	AS Saint-Sulpice-le-Guérétois (8)	2–3	CA Meymac (9)
116.	CO Chénérailles (10)	0–14	Tulle Football Corrèze (7)
117.	AS Eymoutiers (10)	1–1 (4–3 p)	Alouette FC Rive Gauche Limoges (11)
118.	ES Evaux-Budelière (10)	1–2	AS Châteauneuf-Neuvic (8)
119.	Occitane FC (9)	2–2 (4–3 p)	USS Mérinchal (9)
120.	Diables Bleus Bersac (11)	1–2	Espoirs La Geneytouse (10)
121.	AS Nexon (10)	2–2 (6–5 p)	AS Seilhac (10)
122.	AS Ambazac (9)	0–2	US Saint-Léonard-de-Noblat (8)
123.	FC Saint-Martin-Terressus (12)	0–11	AS Gouzon (7)
124.	Amicale Saint-Hilaire Venarsal (10)	3–1	US Feuillardiers (11)
125.	Condat FC (11)	2–2 (6–5 p)	FC Limeuil (9)
126.	La Thibérienne (8)	1–0	ASV Malemort (9)
127.	US Marsaneix (11)	0–2	ES Nonards Altillac (9)
128.	FREP Saint-Germain (10)	0–5	AS Jugeals-Noailles (7)
129.	ES Montignacoise (11)	3–2	AS Champcevinel (10)
130.	Entente SR3V (8)	1–2	AS Saint-Pantaleon (7)
131.	ASPO Brive (10)	2–1 (Note: ASPO Brive penalised for fielding a suspended player, FC Argentat qualify.)	FC Argentat (8)
132.	US Saint-Martin (11)	3–3 (5–3 p)	ES Thénacaise (10)
133.	AS Claix-Blanzac (11)	2–7	Nersac FC (10)
134.	AS Chadenac Jarnac Marignac (11)	0–4	CS Leroy Angoulême (7)
135.	EFC Vallée du Coran (11)	0–2	ES Tonnacquoise-Lussantaise (10)
136.	FC Cubnezais (11)	3–4	ES Linars (8)
137.	ASFC Vindelle (8)	2–3	ES Champniers (8)
138.	AC Gond-Pontouvre (11)	4–5	CO La Couronne (9)
139.	Entente Soubise Port-des-Barques (11)	0–0 (0–3 p)	Ile d’Oléron Football (9)
140.	US Nord Gironde (8)	3–1	Alliance Foot 3B (7)
141.	Saint-Hilaire FC (10)	0–1	AS Nontron-Saint-Pardoux (7)
142.	FC La Tour Mareuil Verteillac (8)	1–3	Saint-Palais SF (8)
143.	Parempuyre FC (11)	1–9	FC Saint André-de-Cubzac (8)
144.	Stade Pessacais UC (9)	6–0	CA Carbon-Blanc (10)
145.	FC Loubesien (8)	0–1	AG Vendays-Montalivet (9)
146.	ES Fronsadaise (9)	2–0	ES Blanquefort (7)
147.	US Artiguaise (9)	0–5	US Lormont (7)
148.	US Coutras (9)	0–0 (3–2 p)	FC Grand Saint-Emilionnais (7)
149.	Limens JSA (8)	0–1	Montpon-Ménesplet FC (8)
150.	US Saint-Denis-de-Pile (10)	1–2	CMO Bassens (7)
151.	SJ Macaudaise (9)	1–3	AS Le Taillan (8)
152.	Les Aiglons Razacois (11)	0–4	FC Médoc Océan (8)
153.	US Mussidan-Saint Medard (8)	2–1	Athletic 89 FC (9)
154.	FC Vallée de l'Aria (11)	0–3	US Chancelade/Marsac (7)
155.	AS Miramont-Lavergne (9)	1–3	USJ Saint-Augustin Club Pyrénées Aquitaine (10)
156.	AS Laugnac (10)	0–0 (3–4 p)	SU Agen (7)
157.	US Lamothe-Mongauzy (11)	1–5	UFC Saint-Colomb-de-Lauzun (9)
158.	Mas AC (8)	0–6	La Brède FC (7)
159.	Fraternelle Landiras (10)	0–3	FC Talence (7)
160.	CS Lantonnais (9)	2–1	FC des Graves (7)
161.	Targon-Soulignac FC (8)	2–0	FC Martignas-Illac (7)
162.	Confluent Football 47 (8)	3–2	FC Faux (9)
163.	FC Bords de Garonne (10)	1–1 (2–3 p)	FC Porte d'Aquitaine 47 (8)
164.	Bordeaux AC (11)	0–3	US La Catte (9)
165.	RC Bordeaux (8)	4–1	SJ Bergerac (9)
166.	Coqs Rouges Bordeaux (8)	3–1	Union Saint-Bruno (7)
167.	Bordeaux Étudiants CF (9)	0–3	Prigonrieux FC (7)
168.	USC Léognan (10)	2–4	ASSA Pays du Dropt (9)
169.	FC Roquefortais (11)	1–5	Landes Girondines FC (11)
170.	AS Gensac-Montcaret (9)	1–4	FC Marmande 47 (7)
171.	AS Livradaise (11)	1–1 (3–5 p)	Monflanquin FC (10)
172.	US Virazeil-Puymiclan (9)	2–2 (4–2 p)	FC Pays Aurossais (8)
173.	US Bazeillaise (11)	1–4	FC Côteaux Pécharmant (8)
174.	FC Morcenx-Arengosse (10)	0–4	AS Tarnos (8)
175.	FC Belin-Béliet (8)	0–3	FC Saint-Geours (9)
176.	RC Dax (11)	0–7	Hiriburuko Ainhara (7)
177.	AS des Églantines de Hendaye (10)	1–5	Croisés Saint-André Bayonne (7)
178.	Peyrehorade SF (9)	1–9	Seignosse-Capbreton-Soustons FC (7)
179.	Elan Boucalais (9)	2–3	Cazaux Olympique (8)
180.	JS Teichoise (10)	0–1	Les Labourdins d'Ustaritz (8)
181.	Marensin FC (9)	0–2	Biscarrosse OFC (7)
182.	FC Saint-Martin-de-Seignanx (8)	0–1	Hasparren FC (8)
183.	ES Nay-Vath-Vielha (8)	2–1	SA Mauléonais (8)
184.	FC Tartas Saint-Yaguen (8)	0–1	Union Jurançonnaise (8)
185.	AS Mourenx-Bourg (11)	1–2	SC Saint-Pierre-du-Mont (8)
186.	FC Artiguelouve-Arbus-Aubertin (9)	3–3 (5–4 p)	Patronage Bazadais (7)
187.	FA Bourbaki Pau (10)	2–1	Sud Gironde FC (8)
188.	US Castétis-Gouze (9)	5–1	FC des Enclaves et du Plateau (10)
189.	ES Latrilloise (11)	0–1	Entente Saint-Martin Geloux (10)
190.	FC Doazit (7)	1–0	ES Montoise (8)
191.	SA Mauzé-Rigné (12)	0–2	ES Fayenoirterre (11)
192.	Varetz AC (10)	2–5	Beynat Lanteuil FC (9)
193.	AGJA Caudéran (9)	5–1	CA Sainte-Hélène (8)
194.	Limoges Football (7)	3–0	CA Rilhac-Rancon (8)
195.	Avenir Mourenxois (8)	2–0 (Note: The original match on 31 August 2024 was abandoned after 48 minutes, with the scoreline 1–1, after floodlight failure. The match was replayed on 8 September 2024)	FA Morlaàs Est Béarn (8)
196.	CA Chamboulive (10)	3–2	CAPO Limoges (11)

== Third round ==
These matches were played on 14, 15 and 25 September 2024.

Third Round Results: Nouvelle Aquitaine
Tie no	Home team (Tier)	Score	Away team (Tier)
1.	La Ligugéenne Football (7)	1–1 (7–6 p)	EF Le Tallud (7)
2.	SO Châtellerault (5)	2–1	FC Nueillaubiers (6)
3.	FC Rouillé (10)	0–2	FC Chauray (5)
4.	Union Saint-Médard Petit-Palais (10)	0–3	Stade Ruffec (7)
5.	US Pays Maixentais (9)	2–3	SA Moncoutant (7)
6.	FC Airvo Saint-Jouin (9)	3–0	FC Autize (8)
7.	AS Maritime (9)	1–1 (4–2 p)	ES Nouaillé (8)
8.	FC Confolentais (9)	1–1 (4–5 p)	Limoges Football (7)
9.	AS Gouzon (7)	4–1	US Bessines-Morterolles (8)
10.	CA Saint-Savin-Saint-Germain (7)	2–0	CS Boussac (8)
11.	ES Tonnacquoise-Lussantaise (10)	5–0	ES Champniers (8)
12.	FC Saint-Médard-en-Jalles (7)	2–1	US Lormont (7)
13.	FC Porte d'Aquitaine 47 (8)	2–1	Stade Pessacais UC (9)
14.	Hiriburuko Ainhara (7)	3–1	Saint-Paul Sport (6)
15.	Seignosse-Capbreton-Soustons FC (7)	2–0	ES Nay-Vath-Vielha (8)
16.	Biscarrosse OFC (7)	1–0	Bleuets Pau (8)
17.	FC Bassin Artiz Arthez Lacq (9)	3–0	Union Jurançonnaise (8)
18.	Entente Saint-Martin Geloux (10)	0–3	Aviron Bayonnais (5)
19.	Thouars Foot 79 (6)	2–0	CA Neuville (6)
20.	RC Parthenay Viennay (7)	0–0 (7–6 p)	CO Cerizay (8)
21.	AAAM Laleu-La Pallice (8)	6–4	AS Pays Mellois (8)
22.	Gati-Foot (8)	2–2 (4–5 p)	FC Périgny (6)
23.	Avenir Nord Foot 87 (9)	3–4	AF Portugais Limoges (7)
24.	FC 3 Vallées 86 (8)	3–0	USA Compreignac (8)
25.	JS Lafarge Limoges (8)	0–3	CS Feytiat (6)
26.	Ile d’Oléron Football (9)	1–0	AS Puymoyen (8)
27.	OFC Ruelle (9)	0–3	Jarnac SF (7)
28.	FC Saint André-de-Cubzac (8)	4–2	FCA Moron (8)
29.	Nersac FC (10)	2–4	UA Cognac (8)
30.	FC Fontcouverte (9)	0–5	Stade Bordelais (5)
31.	FC Seudre Océan (9)	3–2	AS Cozes (6)
32.	Royan Vaux AFC (8)	4–5	ES Linars (8)
33.	ES Saintes (8)	2–3	Rochefort FC (6)
34.	AS Cabariot (9)	1–0	Entente Saint-Séverin/Palluaud (10)
35.	AS Jugeals-Noailles (7)	3–2	Tulle Football Corrèze (7)
36.	CA Meymac (9)	1–1 (3–4 p)	US Saint-Léonard-de-Noblat (8)
37.	Périgueux Foot (9)	0–2	ES Boulazac (6)
38.	US Donzenac (8)	1–0	FC Thenon-Limeyrat-Fossemagne (9)
39.	AS Nontron-Saint-Pardoux (7)	1–2	FC Sarlat-Marcillac (8)
40.	ES Nonards Altillac (9)	2–2 (4–3 p)	FC Pays Arédien (9)
41.	Monflanquin FC (10)	1–0	US La Catte (9)
42.	UFC Saint-Colomb-de-Lauzun (9)	0–7	SU Agen (7)
43.	FC Cœur Médoc Atlantique (7)	6–1	FC Rive Droite 33 (8)
44.	RC Chambéry (8)	4–0	ES Eysinaise (8)
45.	AG Vendays-Montalivet (9)	3–0	AGJA Caudéran (9)
46.	Pessac FC (10)	0–2	Confluent Football 47 (8)
47.	ASSA Pays du Dropt (9)	3–0	USJ Saint-Augustin Club Pyrénées Aquitaine (10)
48.	AS Tarnos (8)	2–1	JA Dax (9)
49.	Hasparren FC (8)	0–4	FC Bassin d'Arcachon (5)
50.	Les Labourdins d'Ustaritz (8)	0–1	Arin Luzien (6)
51.	FC Argentat (8)	1–2	Beynat Lanteuil FC (9)
52.	Cazaux Olympique (8)	1–1 (7–6 p)	Stade Ygossais (7)
53.	US Saint-Sauveur (8)	1–1 (7–6 p)	AS Mignaloux-Beauvoir (8)
54.	UA Niort Saint-Florent (7)	3–2	ES La Rochelle (6)
55.	AS Échiré Saint-Gelais (8)	0–5	ES Buxerolles (6)
56.	ACS Mahorais 79 (12)	1–2	AS Portugais Châtellerault (9)
57.	ES Louzy (11)	1–4	US Mauzé-sur-le-Mignon (10)
58.	AS Portugais Cerizay (10)	3–0	FC Chanteloup-Courlay-Chapelle (9)
59.	Inter Bocage FC (8)	1–0	ES Saint-Cerbouillé (9)
60.	AS Saint-Martin-lès-Melle (11)	0–2	ES Beaumont-Saint-Cyr (7)
61.	ACS La Rochelle (11)	1–5	Ozon FC (7)
62.	FC Pays Néo-Créchois (9)	0–3	FC Bressuire (6)
63.	ES Fayenoirterre (11)	0–7	OL Saint-Liguaire Niort (7)
64.	CA Saint-Aubin-le-Cloud (9)	0–1	FC Réthais (8)
65.	ASS Portugais La Rochelle (10)	2–2 (3–1 p)	JS Nieuil l'Espoir (8)
66.	FC Fontaine-le-Comte (8)	1–2	ES Aubinrorthais (8)
67.	FC Saint-Rogatien (11)	0–3	FC Dompierre-Sainte-Soulle (7)
68.	FC Charente Limousine (7)	2–2 (5–6 p)	US Chauvigny (5)
69.	FC Vallée du Salleron (12)	2–4	Red Star Club Saint-Priest-Taurion (10)
70.	ES Guérétoise (7)	2–0	UES Montmorillon (7)
71.	AS Lussac-les-Églises (11)	2–4	ES Bénévent-Marsac (9)
72.	Limoges Landouge (8)	0–3	AS Panazol (5)
73.	ES Brion-Saint-Secondin (10)	1–1 (2–4 p)	AS Sèvres-Anxaumont (11)
74.	Avenir Matha (8)	3–2	US Coutras (9)
75.	FC Estuaire Haute Gironde (8)	1–5	Étoile Maritime FC (7)
76.	CS Leroy Angoulême (7)	2–3	La Roche/Rivières FC Tardoire (8)
77.	US Nord Gironde (8)	1–0	JS Basseau Angoulême (8)
78.	US Saint-Martin (11)	1–5	Saint-Palais SF (8)
79.	AS Saint-Christophe 17 (10)	0–1	SA Mérignac (6)
80.	CO La Couronne (9)	2–0	FC Roullet-Saint-Estèphe (10)
81.	Espoirs La Geneytouse (10)	1–8	Trélissac-Antonne Périgord FC (5)
82.	AS Nexon (10)	0–3	ESA Brive (6)
83.	Occitane FC (9)	1–3	JA Isle (6)
84.	FC Saint-Priest-sous-Aixe (8)	1–1 (5–4 p)	La Thibérienne (8)
85.	AS Saint-Pantaleon (7)	1–1 (4–3 p)	AS Châteauneuf-Neuvic (8)
86.	AS Eymoutiers (10)	2–3	Amicale Saint-Hilaire Venarsal (10)
87.	Condat FC (11)	0–0 (5–3 p)	ES Montignacoise (11)
88.	SC Verneuil-sur-Vienne (8)	3–2	AS Aixoise (8)
89.	La Brède FC (7)	2–2 (5–4 p)	Langon FC (6)
90.	CS Lantonnais (9)	0–0 (4–5 p)	FC Marmande 47 (7)
91.	Andernos Sport FC (7)	1–2	Entente Boé Bon-Encontre (6)
92.	AS Le Taillan (8)	4–0	US Virazeil-Puymiclan (9)
93.	Landes Girondines FC (11)	1–3	FC Médoc Océan (8)
94.	Montpon-Ménesplet FC (8)	1–1 (5–3 p)	CO Coulouniex-Chamiers (8)
95.	Targon-Soulignac FC (8)	2–3	FC des Portes de l'Entre-Deux-Mers (6)
96.	FC Talence (7)	1–1 (3–1 p)	RC Bordeaux (8)
97.	CA Castets-en-Dorthe (8)	0–2	CMO Bassens (7)
98.	US Chancelade/Marsac (7)	0–2	US Lège Cap Ferret (5)
99.	Stade Saint-Médardais (7)	1–2	FCE Mérignac Arlac (6)
100.	ES Canéjan (11)	2–0	US Mussidan-Saint Medard (8)
101.	SA Sanilhacois (8)	1–1 (1–4 p)	Coqs Rouges Bordeaux (8)
102.	ES Fronsadaise (9)	0–4	Prigonrieux FC (7)
103.	FC Côteaux Pécharmant (8)	1–7	SAG Cestas (6)
104.	FC Vallée du Lot (9)	1–6	Jeunesse Villenave (6)
105.	AS Mazères-Uzos-Rontignon (6)	0–0 (1–3 p)	JA Biarritz (7)
106.	FA Bourbaki Pau (10)	2–2 (4–1 p)	FC Doazit (7)
107.	SA Saint-Séverin (9)	2–4	Stade Montois (7)
108.	AL Poey-de-Lescar (8)	0–2	US Marsan (8)
109.	SC Saint-Pierre-du-Mont (8)	4–1	FC La Ribère (8)
110.	FC Artiguelouve-Arbus-Aubertin (9)	1–3	Croisés Saint-André Bayonne (7)
111.	US Saint-Palais Amikuze (10)	1–1 (2–4 p)	FC Lescar (7)
112.	US Castétis-Gouze (9)	1–0	FC Biganos (6)
113.	FC Saint-Geours (9)	1–3	Avenir Mourenxois (8)
114.	CA Chamboulive (10)	0–4	USE Couzeix-Chaptelat (7)
115.	CS Naintré (8)	1–2	Chamois Niortais F.C. (8)

== Fourth round ==
These matches were played on 28 and 29 September 2024, with one played on 20 October 2024.

Fourth Round Results: Nouvelle Aquitaine
Tie no	Home team (Tier)	Score	Away team (Tier)
1.	AG Vendays-Montalivet (9)	1–2	FC Cœur Médoc Atlantique (7)
2.	JA Isle (6)	1–3	ESA Brive (6)
3.	Stade Bordelais (5)	0–0 (5–4 p)	Bergerac Périgord FC (4)
4.	AS Portugais Châtellerault (9)	0–10	Stade Poitevin FC (4)
5.	FC Airvo Saint-Jouin (9)	1–3	Chamois Niortais F.C. (8)
6.	FC Réthais (8)	1–1 (4–3 p)	SO Châtellerault (5)
7.	ES Tonnacquoise-Lussantaise (10)	0–4	FC Périgny (6)
8.	Saint-Palais SF (8)	2–6	FC Chauray (5)
9.	FC Dompierre-Sainte-Soulle (7)	3–2	FC Saint André-de-Cubzac (8)
10.	US Saint-Léonard-de-Noblat (8)	1–3	USE Couzeix-Chaptelat (7)
11.	Entente Boé Bon-Encontre (6)	2–0	Croisés Saint-André Bayonne (7)
12.	FC Bassin Artiz Arthez Lacq (9)	2–6	La Brède FC (7)
13.	Hiriburuko Ainhara (7)	0–2	Cazaux Olympique (8)
14.	FC Porte d'Aquitaine 47 (8)	0–3	AS Tarnos (8)
15.	Seignosse-Capbreton-Soustons FC (7)	1–2	Aviron Bayonnais (5)
16.	AS Maritime (9)	0–2	US Chauvigny (5)
17.	RC Parthenay Viennay (7)	2–2 (1–3 p)	FC 3 Vallées 86 (8)
18.	UA Cognac (8)	1–2	CMO Bassens (7)
19.	AAAM Laleu-La Pallice (8)	1–3	Ile d’Oléron Football (9)
20.	Rochefort FC (6)	0–2	Jarnac SF (7)
21.	La Roche/Rivières FC Tardoire (8)	3–2	Trélissac-Antonne Périgord FC (5)
22.	CS Feytiat (6)	2–2 (7–6 p)	Limoges Football (7)
23.	Red Star Club Saint-Priest-Taurion (10)	0–5	ES Boulazac (6)
24.	US Donzenac (8)	0–3	AS Panazol (5)
25.	FC Sarlat-Marcillac (8)	3–0	AS Jugeals-Noailles (7)
26.	ES Nonards Altillac (9)	1–2	AF Portugais Limoges (7)
27.	Beynat Lanteuil FC (9)	1–5	ES Guérétoise (7)
28.	ASSA Pays du Dropt (9)	0–2	Jeunesse Villenave (6)
29.	FC Marmande 47 (7)	2–0	SU Agen (7)
30.	Monflanquin FC (10)	0–3	FC des Portes de l'Entre-Deux-Mers (6)
31.	FC Médoc Océan (8)	1–5	US Lège Cap Ferret (5)
32.	Prigonrieux FC (7)	1–1 (2–4 p)	FC Talence (7)
33.	JA Biarritz (7)	1–4 (Note: FC Bassin d'Arcachon penalised for fielding a player not on the teamsheet, JA Biarritz qualify.)	FC Bassin d'Arcachon (5)
34.	Ozon FC (7)	3–1	UA Niort Saint-Florent (7)
35.	AS Sèvres-Anxaumont (11)	1–1 (3–4 p)	Étoile Maritime FC (7)
36.	SA Moncoutant (7)	0–6	FC Bressuire (6)
37.	ES Aubinrorthais (8)	0–1	CA Saint-Savin-Saint-Germain (7)
38.	ES Beaumont-Saint-Cyr (7)	3–0	La Ligugéenne Football (7)
39.	US Mauzé-sur-le-Mignon (10)	0–2	Stade Ruffec (7)
40.	Inter Bocage FC (8)	0–5	Thouars Foot 79 (6)
41.	ASS Portugais La Rochelle (10)	2–2 (5–4 p)	US Saint-Sauveur (8)
42.	AS Portugais Cerizay (10)	0–6	ES Buxerolles (6)
43.	ES Linars (8)	2–1	Avenir Matha (8)
44.	SA Mérignac (6)	5–1	FC Saint-Médard-en-Jalles (7)
45.	FC Seudre Océan (9)	0–5	FC Girondins de Bordeaux (4)
46.	CO La Couronne (9)	1–0	AS Cabariot (9)
47.	OL Saint-Liguaire Niort (7)	2–0	US Nord Gironde (8)
48.	ES Bénévent-Marsac (9)	0–3	AS Gouzon (7)
49.	FC Saint-Priest-sous-Aixe (8)	0–3	Angoulême Charente FC (4)
50.	Condat FC (11)	0–2	AS Saint-Pantaleon (7)
51.	Amicale Saint-Hilaire Venarsal (10)	0–2	SC Verneuil-sur-Vienne (8)
52.	AS Le Taillan (8)	1–1 (5–3 p)	Montpon-Ménesplet FC (8)
53.	Coqs Rouges Bordeaux (8)	0–2	RC Chambéry (8)
54.	Confluent Football 47 (8)	0–4	FCE Mérignac Arlac (6)
55.	SAG Cestas (6)	4–1	FC Lescar (7)
56.	ES Canéjan (11)	0–6	Biscarrosse OFC (7)
57.	US Castétis-Gouze (9)	0–5	Genêts Anglet (4)
58.	US Marsan (8)	0–2	SC Saint-Pierre-du-Mont (8)
59.	FA Bourbaki Pau (10)	0–5	Arin Luzien (6)
60.	Avenir Mourenxois (8)	3–1 (Note: Original match on 28 September 2024 was abandoned after 80 minutes, with the scoreline 2–0, after a scuffle between players on the pitch led to fighting between fans. The game was ordered to be replayed at a neutral venue, behind closed doors, on 20 October 2024.)	Stade Montois (7)

== Fifth round ==
These matches were played on 11,12,13,14 and 27 October 2024.

Fifth Round Results: Nouvelle Aquitaine
Tie no	Home team (Tier)	Score	Away team (Tier)
1.	Stade Poitevin FC (4)	1–0	US Chauvigny (5)
2.	Genêts Anglet (4)	0–1	Stade Bordelais (5)
3.	Aviron Bayonnais (5)	6–0	Arin Luzien (6)
4.	FC Cœur Médoc Atlantique (7)	1–1 (4–2 p)	FC des Portes de l'Entre-Deux-Mers (6)
5.	US Lège Cap Ferret (5)	2–2 (5–4 p)	ESA Brive (6)
6.	Jeunesse Villenave (6)	1–1 (4–3 p)	Entente Boé Bon-Encontre (6)
7.	ES Guérétoise (7)	1–1 (4–5 p)	USE Couzeix-Chaptelat (7)
8.	CA Saint-Savin-Saint-Germain (7)	1–1 (3–4 p)	AF Portugais Limoges (7)
9.	Stade Ruffec (7)	0–4	Angoulême Charente FC (4)
10.	AS Tarnos (8)	2–2 (5–4 p)	SC Saint-Pierre-du-Mont (8)
11.	Biscarrosse OFC (7)	0–3	FCE Mérignac Arlac (6)
12.	FC Talence (7)	0–1	Cazaux Olympique (8)
13.	FC Sarlat-Marcillac (8)	1–5	SA Mérignac (6)
14.	Chamois Niortais F.C. (8)	3–1	SC Verneuil-sur-Vienne (8)
15.	La Roche/Rivières FC Tardoire (8)	1–3	ES Beaumont-Saint-Cyr (7)
16.	FC Périgny (6)	2–2 (5–6 p)	CS Feytiat (6)
17.	FC 3 Vallées 86 (8)	1–2	ES Buxerolles (6)
18.	Ile d’Oléron Football (9)	0–5	Thouars Foot 79 (6)
19.	FC Bressuire (6)	3–0	Jarnac SF (7)
20.	AS Gouzon (7)	1–2	AS Panazol (5)
21.	AS Le Taillan (8)	2–1	ES Boulazac (6)
22.	La Brède FC (7)	2–2 (4–3 p)	SAG Cestas (6)
23.	CO La Couronne (9)	1–3	FC Marmande 47 (7)
24.	AS Saint-Pantaleon (7)	1–1 (1–3 p)	JA Biarritz (7)
25.	ASS Portugais La Rochelle (10)	0–3	FC Dompierre-Sainte-Soulle (7)
26.	Ozon FC (7)	3–2	FC Réthais (8)
27.	OL Saint-Liguaire Niort (7)	1–1 (5–6 p)	ES Linars (8)
28.	Étoile Maritime FC (7)	0–0 (5–4 p)	FC Chauray (5)
29.	CMO Bassens (7)	0–3	FC Girondins de Bordeaux (4)
30.	RC Chambéry (8)	1–1 (0–3 p)	Avenir Mourenxois (8)

== Sixth round ==
These matches were played on 26 and 27 October and 2 November 2024.

Sixth Round Results: Nouvelle Aquitaine
Tie no	Home team (Tier)	Score	Away team (Tier)
1.	Thouars Foot 79 (6)	1–0	Stade Bordelais (5)
2.	Cazaux Olympique (8)	2–1	AS Le Taillan (8)
3.	FC Cœur Médoc Atlantique (7)	1–4	FC Girondins de Bordeaux (4)
4.	FC Dompierre-Sainte-Soulle (7)	2–2 (3–4 p)	Angoulême Charente FC (4)
5.	ES Buxerolles (6)	1–2	USE Couzeix-Chaptelat (7)
6.	Aviron Bayonnais (5)	5–1	US Lège Cap Ferret (5)
7.	Chamois Niortais F.C. (8)	4–1	Ozon FC (7)
8.	CS Feytiat (6)	2–2 (3–1 p)	JA Biarritz (7)
9.	FCE Mérignac Arlac (6)	3–0	Stade Poitevin FC (4)
10.	FC Marmande 47 (7)	1–1 (5–3 p)	AS Tarnos (8)
11.	ES Beaumont-Saint-Cyr (7)	1–1 (5–4 p)	La Brède FC (7)
12.	SA Mérignac (6)	2–0	Jeunesse Villenave (6)
13.	Étoile Maritime FC (7)	0–0 (4–2 p)	AS Panazol (5)
14.	ES Linars (8)	1–3	FC Bressuire (6)
15.	AF Portugais Limoges (7)	0–0 (2–4 p)	Avenir Mourenxois (8)
