= 2011–12 Championnat de France Amateur 2 =

Championnat de France amateur 2
- Season: 2011–12
- Promoted: Grenoble; Montceau Bourgogne; Saint-Malo; Stade Bordelais; Strasbourg; Trélissac
- Relegated: Agen; Blagnac; Chaumont; Cognac; Créteil B; ÉF Bastia; Eu; Flers; Furiani-Agliani; Gardanne; Imphy Decize; Les Herbiers B; Mâcon; Marck; Mérignac; Neuves-Maisons; Saint-Dié; Saint-Dizier; Saint-Georges-les-Ancizes; Saint-Jean-le-Blanc; Saint-Omer; Steinseltz; Tours B; Trouville-Deauville; Vannes B
- Matches: 1,836
- Goals: 4,957 (2.7 per match)
- Biggest home win: Illzach Modenheim 8–1 Steinseltz (10 September 2011)
- Biggest away win: Steinseltz 0–7 Saint-Louis Neuweg (28 April 2012)
- Highest scoring: Sablé-sur-Sarthe 3–7 Guingamp B (10 September 2011); Tours B 5–5 Cognac (10 March 2012); Propiano 6–4 Furiani-Agliani (13 May 2012)
- Longest winning run: 8 games Trélissac (12 November – 25 February)
- Longest unbeaten run: 18 games Grenoble (20 August – 10 March)
- Longest winless run: 19 games Mâcon (20 August – 24 March)
- Longest losing run: 8 games Chaumont (20 August – 5 November)
- Highest attendance: 9,440 – Strasbourg 4–1 Illzach Modenheim (3 September 2011)

The 2011–12 Championnat de France amateur 2 season was the 14th since its establishment. Chambéry were the defending champions. The teams and groups were announced on 18 July 2011 and the fixtures were determined on 28 July. The season began on 20 August 2011 and ended on 2 June 2012. The winter break was in effect from 23 December to 6 January.

== Teams ==
There were 34 promoted teams from the Division d'Honneur, replacing the 32 teams that were relegated from the Championnat de France amateur 2 following the 2010–11 season. A total of 72 teams competed in the league with 32 clubs suffering relegation to the sixth division, the Division d'Honneur. All non-reserve clubs that secured league status for the season were subject to approval by the DNCG before becoming eligible to participate in the competition.

=== Promotion and relegation ===
Teams relegated to Championnat de France amateur 2

- Aurillac
- Genêts Anglet
- Louhans-Cuiseaux
- Noisy-le-Sec
- Saint-Pryvé Saint-Hilaire
- Rennes B

Teams promoted to Championnat de France amateur 2

- Ajaccio B
- Amiens B
- Aubagne
- Belfort Sud
- Boulogne B
- Chaumont
- Échirolles
- Eu
- Evian B
- Flers
- Fleury-Mérogis
- Fresnoy-le-Grand
- Iris Club
- La Suze
- Le Poiré-sur-Vie B
- Les Herbiers B
- Limoges
- Mâcon
- Marmande
- Marseille B
- Muret
- Narbonne
- Neuves-Maisons
- Saint-Colomban Locminé
- Saint-Georges-les-Ancizes
- Saint-Jean-le-Blanc
- Sézanne
- Steinseltz
- Thaon
- Thouars
- Trouville-Deauville
- Vannes B

=== DNCG rulings ===
On 26 May 2011, following a preliminary review of each club's administrative and financial accounts in the Championnat National, the DNCG ruled that Grenoble would be relegated to the Championnat de France amateur (CFA) after the organization determined that the club was enduring financial difficulties. The organization also excluded relegated Championnat de France amateur club Toulon from participating in the CFA 2 and relegated both Agde and Chambéry to the fifth division. Chambéry had finished as the champions of the 2010–11 edition of the CFA 2. On 4 June, the DNCG announced that, for the second consecutive season, Calais would not be allowed to ascend to the CFA, which meant the club would be returning to the fifth division. All clubs had the option to appeal the rulings.

On 22 June, L'Entente SSG was relegated to the fifth division after the club declared bankruptcy. On 4 July, Grenoble confirmed on its website that the Appeals Board of the DNCG had informed club officials that it will be relegated to the fourth division. Grenoble, subsequently, entered liquidation on 7 July, which made the club unable to participate in the CFA. The club was eventually inserted into the CFA 2. On the same day as the Grenoble ruling, the DNCG also rejected the appeals of Toulon and Calais. Division d'Honneur club Sézanne took up Toulon's position in the CFA 2. On 24 August, the Executive Committee of the French Football Federation announced that RC Strasbourg would be relegated to the CFA 2 after a Strasbourg tribunal ordered the club to enter liquidation. Strasbourg will, subsequently, replaced its reserve team in the division as they cannot appear in the same division as its parent club.

== League tables ==
=== Group A ===
Pos	Team	Pld	W	D	L	GF	GA	GD	Pts	Promotion or relegation
1	Chambly (P)	30	15	11	4	42	27	+15	86	Promotion to 2012–13 Championnat de France amateur
2	L'Entente SSG	30	15	10	5	50	27	+23	85	
3	Boulogne Reserves	30	12	11	7	56	36	+20	77	
4	Amiens Reserves	30	12	9	9	33	31	+2	75	
5	Grande-Synthe	30	12	8	10	36	27	+9	74	
6	Dieppe	30	10	13	7	42	32	+10	73	
7	Calais	30	12	6	12	38	37	+1	72	
8	Oissel	30	11	8	11	29	34	−5	71	
9	Gravelines	30	8	13	9	38	39	−1	67	
10	Beauvais Reserves	30	8	13	9	31	32	−1	67	
11	Rouen Reserves	30	9	10	11	34	38	−4	67	
12	Noisy-le-Sec	30	8	12	10	34	38	−4	66	
13	Issy-les-Moulineaux (R)	30	8	12	10	38	44	−6	65 (Note: Issy-les-Moulineaux was docked one point.)	Relegation to 2012–13 Division d'Honneur
14	Marck (R)	30	7	11	12	33	43	−10	62	Relegation to 2012–13 Division d'Honneur
15	Saint-Omer (R)	30	8	6	16	39	55	−16	60	Relegation to 2012–13 Division d'Honneur
16	Eu (R)	30	4	9	17	25	58	−33	51	Relegation to 2012–13 Division d'Honneur

Updated to match(es) played on 2 June 2012. Source: French Football Federation
Rules for classification: 1) points; 2) goal difference; 3) number of goals scored.
(P) Promoted; (R) Relegated

=== Group B ===
Pos	Team	Pld	W	D	L	GF	GA	GD	Pts	Promotion or relegation
1	Roye (P)	30	17	7	6	55	33	+22	88	Promotion to 2012–13 Championnat de France amateur
2	Feignies	30	16	7	7	37	28	+9	85	
3	Sedan Reserves	30	14	11	5	56	38	+18	83	
4	Racing Paris	30	14	8	8	48	39	+9	80	
5	Wasquehal	30	14	7	9	51	33	+18	79	
6	Iris Club	30	13	7	10	58	35	+23	76	
7	Troyes Reserves	30	13	5	12	50	40	+10	74	
8	Sainte-Geneviève	30	10	13	7	37	35	+2	73	
9	Arras	30	11	9	10	45	39	+6	72	
10	Fleury-Mérogis	30	9	13	8	34	36	−2	70	
11	Paris FC Reserves	30	12	4	14	38	45	−7	70	
12	Fresnoy-le-Grand (R, R)	30	9	10	11	31	35	−4	67	Relegation to 2012–13 Division d'Honneur
13	Reims Reserves (R)	30	9	8	13	33	43	−10	65	Relegation to 2012–13 Division d'Honneur
14	Sézanne (R)	30	8	8	14	41	53	−12	62	Relegation to 2012–13 Division d'Honneur
15	Créteil Reserves (R)	30	4	8	18	34	64	−30	50	Relegation to 2012–13 Division d'Honneur
16	Saint-Dizier (R)	30	1	7	22	15	67	−52	37 (Note: Saint-Dizier was docked three points after forfeiting a match against Fleury-Mérogis in April 2012.)	Relegation to 2012–13 Division d'Honneur

Updated to match(es) played on 2 June 2012. Source: French Football Federation
Rules for classification: 1) points; 2) goal difference; 3) number of goals scored.
(P) Promoted; (R) Relegated

=== Group C ===
Pos	Team	Pld	W	D	L	GF	GA	GD	Pts	Promotion or relegation
1	Strasbourg (P)	30	21	7	2	66	14	+52	100	Promotion to 2012–13 Championnat de France amateur
2	Pontarlier	30	18	7	5	47	29	+18	91	
3	Auxerre Reserves (R)	30	18	3	9	58	35	+23	87 (Note: Auxerre C cannot earn promotion to the Championnat de France amateur because the parent club's second reserve team, Auxerre B, currently play in the division.)	Relegation to 2012–13 Division d'Honneur
4	Vesoul	30	14	9	7	42	27	+15	81	
5	Saint-Louis Neuweg	30	15	5	10	47	32	+15	80	
6	Dijon Reserves	30	14	7	9	60	33	+27	79	
7	Schiltigheim	30	15	2	13	44	39	+5	77	
8	Jarville	30	13	6	11	51	39	+12	75	
9	Illzach Modenheim	30	12	6	12	52	49	+3	72	
10	Forbach	30	12	5	13	44	37	+7	71	
11	Belfort Sud	30	10	11	9	40	42	−2	71	
12	Thaon	30	10	10	10	37	41	−4	70	
13	Saint-Dié (R)	30	6	5	19	29	63	−34	53	Relegation to 2012–13 Division d'Honneur
14	Chaumont (R)	30	5	6	19	20	54	−34	51	Relegation to 2012–13 Division d'Honneur
15	Steinseltz (R)	30	5	4	21	25	79	−54	49	Relegation to 2012–13 Division d'Honneur
16	Neuves-Maisons (R)	30	2	7	21	21	70	−49	43	Relegation to 2012–13 Division d'Honneur

Updated to match(es) played on 2 June 2012. Source: French Football Federation
Rules for classification: 1) points; 2) goal difference; 3) number of goals scored.
(P) Promoted; (R) Relegated

=== Group D ===
Pos	Team	Pld	W	D	L	GF	GA	GD	Pts	Promotion or relegation
1	Montceau Bourgogne (P)	30	18	8	4	64	35	+29	92	Promotion to 2012–13 Championnat de France amateur
2	Bourges	30	15	8	7	46	30	+16	83	
3	Clermont Reserves	30	15	8	7	47	33	+14	83	
4	Bastia Reserves	30	15	7	8	55	40	+15	82	
5	Andrézieux	30	15	6	9	61	34	+27	81	
6	Cournon	30	13	5	12	47	49	−2	74	
7	Louhans-Cuiseaux	30	10	13	7	37	37	0	73	
8	Châteauroux Reserves	30	11	7	12	45	35	+10	70	
9	Feurs	30	10	9	11	31	30	+1	69	
10	Ajaccio Reserves	30	10	9	11	33	36	−3	69	
11	Échirolles	30	9	12	9	37	45	−8	69	
12	Thiers	30	10	7	13	40	43	−3	67	
13	Vierzon (R)	30	9	7	14	43	48	−5	64	Relegation to 2012–13 Division d'Honneur
14	Imphy Decize (R)	30	5	8	17	33	61	−28	53	Relegation to 2012–13 Division d'Honneur
15	Saint-Georges-les-Ancizes (R)	30	6	7	17	35	68	−33	52 (Note: Saint-Georges-les-Ancizes was docked three points.)	Relegation to 2012–13 Division d'Honneur
16	Mâcon (R)	30	4	9	17	27	57	−30	51	Relegation to 2012–13 Division d'Honneur

Updated to match(es) played on 2 June 2012. Source: French Football Federation
Rules for classification: 1) points; 2) goal difference; 3) number of goals scored.
(P) Promoted; (R) Relegated

=== Group E ===
Pos	Team	Pld	W	D	L	GF	GA	GD	Pts	Promotion or relegation
1	Grenoble (P)	30	18	8	4	49	15	+34	92	Promotion to 2012–13 Championnat de France amateur
2	Fréjus Reserves	30	17	7	6	46	20	+26	88	
3	Evian Reserves	30	15	7	8	48	31	+17	82	
4	Aubagne	30	11	11	8	47	34	+13	74	
5	Grasse	30	12	7	11	45	37	+8	73	
6	Marseille Reserves	30	12	7	11	36	34	+2	73	
7	Toulon Le Las	30	10	12	8	34	29	+5	72	
8	Saint-Priest	30	11	8	11	38	37	+1	71	
9	Vénissieux	30	10	10	10	38	39	−1	70	
10	Corte	30	10	9	11	38	45	−7	69	
11	Chambéry	29	11	8	10	30	33	−3	69 (Note: Chambéry was docked one point.)	
12	Nice Reserves	30	11	7	12	43	41	+2	70	
13	Propiano (R)	29	10	8	11	32	38	−6	67	Relegation to 2012–13 Division d'Honneur
14	ÉF Bastia (R)	30	6	8	16	29	57	−28	56	Relegation to 2012–13 Division d'Honneur
15	Gardanne (R)	30	6	6	18	42	74	−32	54	Relegation to 2012–13 Division d'Honneur
16	Furiani-Agliani (R)	30	6	3	21	25	56	−31	50 (Note: Furiani-Agliani was docked one point.)	Relegation to 2012–13 Division d'Honneur

Updated to match(es) played on 2 June 2012. Source: French Football Federation
Rules for classification: 1) points; 2) goal difference; 3) number of goals scored.
(P) Promoted; (R) Relegated

=== Group F ===
Pos	Team	Pld	W	D	L	GF	GA	GD	Pts	Promotion or relegation
1	Stade Bordelais (P)	30	19	5	6	60	26	+34	92	Promotion to 2012–13 Championnat de France amateur
2	Bergerac	30	14	10	6	44	30	+14	82	
3	Toulouse Reserves	30	14	6	10	43	39	+4	78	
4	Genêts d'Anglet	30	13	7	10	39	33	+6	76	
5	Balma	30	12	8	10	31	28	+3	74	
6	Nîmes Reserves	30	12	8	10	28	25	+3	74	
7	Saint-Alban	30	12	8	10	39	44	−5	74	
8	Narbonne	30	12	7	11	36	33	+3	73	
9	Muret	30	10	11	9	24	23	+1	71	
10	Montpellier Reserves	30	10	10	10	47	39	+8	70	
11	Aurillac	30	11	5	14	42	44	−2	68	
12	Lormont	30	10	7	13	40	49	−9	67	
13	Marmande (R)	30	9	8	13	34	41	−7	65	Relegation to 2012–13 Division d'Honneur
14	Agen (R)	30	8	9	13	32	41	−9	63	Relegation to 2012–13 Division d'Honneur
15	Mérignac (R)	30	7	6	17	26	49	−23	57	Relegation to 2012–13 Division d'Honneur
16	Blagnac (R)	30	6	7	17	31	52	−21	55	Relegation to 2012–13 Division d'Honneur

Updated to match(es) played on 2 June 2012. Source: French Football Federation
Rules for classification: 1) points; 2) goal difference; 3) number of goals scored.
(P) Promoted; (R) Relegated

=== Group G ===
Pos	Team	Pld	W	D	L	GF	GA	GD	Pts	Promotion or relegation
1	Trélissac (P)	30	19	7	4	59	22	+37	94	Promotion to 2012–13 Championnat de France amateur
2	Angers Reserves	30	17	8	5	51	24	+27	89	
3	Cholet	30	16	6	8	56	37	+19	84	
4	Chartres	30	14	11	5	56	35	+21	83	
5	Nantes Reserves	30	15	7	8	41	26	+15	82	
6	Vertou	30	15	5	10	37	40	−3	80	
7	Poitiers	30	14	4	12	52	46	+6	76	
8	Saint-Pryvé Saint-Hilaire	30	11	7	12	40	44	−4	70	
9	Châtellerault	30	12	3	15	53	57	−4	69	
10	Thouars	30	11	6	13	30	35	−5	69	
11	Le Poiré-sur-Vie Reserves	30	10	8	12	37	40	−3	68	
12	Limoges	30	10	6	14	44	52	−8	66	
13	Tours Reserves (R)	30	8	8	14	45	55	−10	62	Relegation to 2012–13 Division d'Honneur
14	Les Herbiers Reserves (R)	30	9	3	18	31	49	−18	60	Relegation to 2012–13 Division d'Honneur
15	Cognac (R)	30	3	10	17	29	59	−30	49	Relegation to 2012–13 Division d'Honneur
16	Saint-Jean-le-Blanc (R)	30	2	9	19	18	58	−40	45	Relegation to 2012–13 Division d'Honneur

Updated to match(es) played on 2 June 2012. Source: French Football Federation
Rules for classification: 1) points; 2) goal difference; 3) number of goals scored.
(P) Promoted; (R) Relegated

=== Group H ===
Pos	Team	Pld	W	D	L	GF	GA	GD	Pts	Promotion or relegation
1	Saint-Malo (P)	30	18	5	7	52	29	+23	89	Promotion to 2012–13 Championnat de France amateur
2	Vitré	30	15	11	4	61	40	+21	86	
3	Guingamp Reserves	30	15	7	8	59	40	+19	82	
4	Rennes Reserves	30	13	11	6	63	45	+18	80	
5	Montagnarde	30	12	8	10	52	43	+9	74	
6	Saint-Colomban Locminé	30	11	11	8	46	42	+4	74	
7	Brest Reserves	30	12	7	11	39	32	+7	73	
8	Sablé-sur-Sarthe	30	11	9	10	52	44	+8	72	
9	Mondeville	30	11	9	10	47	50	−3	72	
10	Dinan-Léhon	30	11	8	11	29	40	−11	71	
11	Granville	30	9	11	10	40	40	0	68	
12	La Suze	30	10	7	13	46	54	−8	67	
13	Laval Reserves (R)	30	8	7	15	31	52	−21	61	Relegation to 2012–13 Division d'Honneur
14	Flers (R)	30	8	6	16	35	46	−11	60	Relegation to 2012–13 Division d'Honneur
15	Vannes Reserves (R)	30	8	6	16	28	51	−23	60	Relegation to 2012–13 Division d'Honneur
16	Trouville-Deauville (R)	30	5	3	22	36	68	−32	48	Relegation to 2012–13 Division d'Honneur

Updated to match(es) played on 2 June 2012. Source: French Football Federation
Rules for classification: 1) points; 2) goal difference; 3) number of goals scored.
(P) Promoted; (R) Relegated
