= Alexandre Bouchard =

French footballer (born 1988)

Personal information
- Date of birth: 1 May 1988 (age 38)
- Place of birth: Grande-Synthe, France
- Height: 1.82 m (6 ft 0 in)
- Position: Goalkeeper

Senior career*
| Years | Team | Apps | (Gls) |
| 2006–2008 | Lyon | 0 | (0) |
| 2008–2011 | Châteauroux | 5 | (0) |
| 2011–2012 | Eu | 26 | (0) |
| 2012–2014 | Carquefou | 41 | (0) |
| 2014–2016 | Paris FC | 0 | (0) |
| 2016–2018 | Chamois Niortais | 5 | (0) |
- * Club domestic league appearances and goals as of 20:37, 21 June 2018 (UTC)

Alexandre Bouchard (born 1 May 1988) is a French professional footballer who last played for Chamois Niortais as a goalkeeper. He previously played in Ligue 2 with LB Châteauroux, and has also represented Eu, Carquefou and Paris FC.

In January 2008 he was called up for a training camp with the French Under-21 Futsal team for a 4-day camp.

== Career statistics ==
As of matches played 2 March 2018

Appearances and goals by club, season and competition
| Club | Season | League | | | Coupe de France | | Coupe de la Ligue | | Total | |
| Club | Season | Division | Apps | Goals | Apps | Goals | Apps | Goals | Apps | Goals |
|---|---|---|---|---|---|---|---|---|---|---|
| Châteauroux | 2008–09 | Ligue 2 | 1 | 0 | 0 | 0 | 0 | 0 | 1 | 0 |
| Châteauroux | 2009–10 | Ligue 2 | 1 | 0 | 0 | 0 | 0 | 0 | 1 | 0 |
| Châteauroux | 2010–11 | Ligue 2 | 3 | 0 | 1 | 0 | 0 | 0 | 4 | 0 |
| Châteauroux | Total | | 5 | 0 | 1 | 0 | 0 | 0 | 6 | 0 |
| Eu | 2011–12 | CFA2 Group A | 26 | 0 | 2 | 0 | 0 | 0 | 28 | 0 |
| Carquefou | 2012–13 | National | 9 | 0 | 2 | 0 | 0 | 0 | 11 | 0 |
| Carquefou | 2013–14 | National | 32 | 0 | 1 | 0 | 0 | 0 | 33 | 0 |
| Carquefou | Total | | 41 | 0 | 3 | 0 | 0 | 0 | 44 | 0 |
| Paris | 2014–15 | National | 0 | 0 | 0 | 0 | 0 | 0 | 0 | 0 |
| Paris | 2015–16 | Ligue 2 | 0 | 0 | 0 | 0 | 0 | 0 | 0 | 0 |
| Paris | Total | | 0 | 0 | 0 | 0 | 0 | 0 | 0 | 0 |
| Chamois Niortais | 2016–17 | Ligue 2 | 0 | 0 | 0 | 0 | 0 | 0 | 0 | 0 |
| Chamois Niortais | 2017–18 | Ligue 2 | 5 | 0 | 0 | 0 | 0 | 0 | 5 | 0 |
| Chamois Niortais | Total | | 5 | 0 | 0 | 0 | 0 | 0 | 5 | 0 |
| Career total | | | 77 | 0 | 6 | 0 | 0 | 0 | 83 | 0 |
