= Eu F.C. =

- Full name: Eu Football Club
- Founded: 1979
- Ground: Stade Gérard-Carpentier
- Capacity: 2,000
- Chairman: Claude Saulnier
- Manager: Dominique Stravius
- League: Régional 2
Home colours

Eu Football Club is a French football club based in Eu. They are currently playing at the Régional 2 level.

== History ==
The club began life in 1979 and was originally known as CO Bresle, until 2000 when it changed its name to Eu F.C. The club played in the local, departmental and regional leagues until the end of the 2002-03 campaign, where upon finishing runners up in the Regional league were promoted to the CFA2, the fifth tier of the French football league system. However they could only survive one season in the CFA2 and were relegated back again to the Regional league. The 2010-11 season saw the club win the Regional 1 title and get promoted to the CFA2 again as league champions. Managing again only one season the club was relegated back to the Regional leagues. The club remained in Regional 1 until the end of the 2017–18 season, when after 80 players resigned the club demoted itself to the departmental league. The club has since climbed the ladder and is back in Regional 2 as of the 2026–27 season.

== Ground ==
The club play their home games at the Stade Gérard-Carpentier.The stadium was built in 2001 and originally called Stade des Prés Salés it was given its current name after Gérard Carpentier, president of the club from 1989 to 2002. The stadium has a capacity of 2,000, and features a 300 seater stand.

== Honours ==
- Ligue Normandie champion (1) 2010-11
- Seine-Maritime Departmental 1 champions (1) 2021-22

== Notable Players ==
- (France) Ted Kelton Agasson
- (France) Alexandre Bouchard
- (France) Teddy Bertin
