= La Ligugéenne Football =

French football club

Ligugé
- Full name: La Ligugéenne Football
- Founded: 1922
- Ground: Stade Municipal Maurice Girault, Ligugé
- Chairman: Eric Gonzalez Alamo
- Manager: Thomas Mingam
- League: Régional 2 Poule B Nouvelle-Aquitaine
Home colours

La Ligugéenne Football is a French association football club founded in 1922. The club is based in Ligugé and their home stadium is the Stade Municipal Maurice Girault in the town.

They played in Régional 2 in the 2021-2022 season and finished first in their group, earning promotion to Régional 1 after being relegated 12 years ago. Next season La Ligugéenne will play in Régional 1 in the Nouvelle-Aquitaine region.
