= FC Marmande 47 =

French football club

- Founded: 1946
- Stadium: Stade Michelon, Marmande
- League: CFA 2
- Website: http://www.fcm47.fr
Home colours	Away colours

Football Club Marmande 47 is a French football club founded in 1946, based in Marmande.

== Past players ==
- Farid El Alagui
- Marouane Chamakh
- Jérôme Lebouc
- Sloan Privat
