= UA Cognac =

French football club

- Full name: Union Amicale Cognac Football
- Founded: 1902; 124 years ago
- Ground: Stade Claude Boué, Cognac
- Chairman: Gérard Séguin
- Manager: Olivier Modeste
- League: Régional 1 Nouvelle-Aquitaine
- 2021–22: National 3 Group A, 13th (relegated)
- Website: www.uacfoot.fr
Home colours

Union Amicale Cognac Football is a French association football club founded in 1902. They are based in the town of Cognac and their home stadium is the Stade de la Belle Allée.
