= 2018–19 Coupe de France preliminary rounds, Nouvelle-Aquitaine =

The 2018–19 Coupe de France preliminary rounds, Nouvelle-Aquitaine was the qualifying competition to decide which teams from the leagues of the Nouvelle-Aquitaine region of France took part in the main competition from the seventh round.

== First round ==
These matches were played on 24, 25 and 26 August 2018.

First round results: Nouvelle Aquitaine
Tie no	Home team (tier)	Score	Away team (tier)
1.	FC Canton de Courçon (11)	2–1 (a.e.t.)	ES Aunisienne Aytré (9)
2.	ES Oyré-Dangé (8)	3–5	FC Pays Argentonnais (9)
3.	US Envigne (10)	2–0	ES St Cerbouillé (8)
4.	AS Ingrandes (11)	1–0 (a.e.t.)	US Courlay (8)
5.	US Pays Maixentais (10)	3–1	US Béruges (11)
6.	FC Rouillé (10)	2–3	AS Pays Mellois (9)
7.	SL Cenon-sur-Vienne (10)	2–1	SEPC Exireuil (11)
8.	Gati-Foot (10)	3–0	Chasseneuil-St Georges FC (9)
9.	CDJ Pompaire (11)	2–3	FC Montamisé (9)
10.	RC Parthenay Viennay (8)	2–1	US Mélusine (9)
11.	US Frontenay-St Symphorien (10)	5–1	FC St Rogatien (10)
12.	La Jarrie FC (10)	7–0	AS St Christophe (10)
13.	Canton Aunis FC (10)	4–3 (a.e.t.)	ES Ardin (9)
14.	EFC DB2S (10)	3–2	SA Souché (11)
15.	ASPTT Limoges (10)	5–2	FC St Jal (10)
16.	CA Égletons (9)	2–1	ES Evaux-Budelière (10)
17.	CA Rilhac-Rancon (8)	2–0	US St Fiel (8)
18.	ES Ussel (8)	5–0	AS St Sulpice-le-Guérétois (9)
19.	Fontafie FC (11)	2–1	FC Canton d'Oradour-sur-Vayres (10)
20.	US Chasseneuil (11)	7–0	AC Kurdes Limoges (11)
21.	AS St Georges-des-Côteaux (10)	2–3	AS Merpins (8)
22.	ES Mornac (11)	1–2	Aviron Boutonnais (9)
23.	AS St Yrieix (8)	5–2 (a.e.t.)	US Saujon (9)
24.	US Anais (11)	1–0	ES Port-des-Barques (11)
25.	UAS Verdille (10)	1–0	ES Tonnacquoise-Lussantaise (10)
26.	Élan Salignacois (11)	0–5	AS Jugeals-Noailles (8)
27.	FC Sarlat-Marcillac (8)	6–0	Varetz AC (8)
28.	Espérance St Robertoise (9)	1–2	FC Cendrieux-La Douze (9)
29.	US Meyrals (11)	3–1	Entente des Barrages de la Xaintrie (9)
30.	AS Beynat (8)	1–2 (a.e.t.)	AS Rouffignac-Plazac (8)
31.	Association Saint Laurent Billère (10)	0–4	FC Doazit (8)
32.	FC La Ribère (8)	6–1	FC Lons (9)
33.	US Roquefort	1–4	ES Meillon-Assat-Narcastet (8)
34.	Les Labourdins d'Ustaritz (9)	2–0	Labenne OSC (9)
35.	FC Parentis (10)	4–2 (a.e.t.)	CA Sallois (10)
36.	FC Barpais (9)	4–0	SC Cadaujac (9)
37.	AS St Aubin-de-Médoc (9)	0–2	US Bouscataise (8)
38.	Landes Girondines FC (10)	3–0 (Note: Tie won by forfeit.)	AS Chambéry (11)
39.	Fraternelle Landiras (9)	4–2	FC Casteljaloux (10)
40.	VS Caudrot (9)	– (Note: VS Caudrot penalised for fielding an incorrectly registered player. US Virazeil-Puymiclan qualify. Original result 1–1 (3–1 p))	US Virazeil-Puymiclan (9)
41.	St Médard SC (11)	1–2	AS Pays de Montaigne et Gurçon (9)
42.	US Châteauneuf 16 (10)	0–3	FC Lesparre Médoc (9)
43.	SC Mouthiers (9)	1–1 (1–4 p)	CA Ste Hélène (8)
44.	US Pons (10)	1–2	CMO Bassens (9)
45.	FC St André-de-Cubzac (8)	3–1 (Note: Tie switched at the request of both clubs.)	CS Bussac-Forêt (10)
46.	FC Médoc Océan (8)	3–5	Nersac FC (9)
47.	US Le Dorat (10)	6–3	SS Sillars (11)
48.	AS St Junien (8)	3–0	JS Nieuil l'Espoir (9)
49.	AS Valdivienne (11)	1–3	FC Confolentais (9)
50.	SC Verrières (10)	1–0	ESE Charentais (10)
51.	ES Nouaillé (8)	4–0	ES St Maurice-la-Souterraine (9)
52.	AS Lussac-les-Châteaux (12)	0–5	ES Brion-St Secondin (10)
53.	US La Chapelle-Viviers (13)	0–3	Avenir Bellac-Berneuil-St Junien-les-Combes (8)
54.	AS Civaux (11)	4–5 (a.e.t.)	US Bessines-Morterolles (9)
55.	Entente St Séverin/Palluaud (11)	2–4	Montpon-Ménesplet FC (8)
56.	AS Montguyon (10)	3–4 (a.e.t.)	US Coutras (10)
57.	AJ Montmoreau (11)	1–4	CA Ribéracois (9)
58.	US St Vincent-de-Connezac (10)	3–2	Condat FC (10)
59.	Gué-de-Sénac FC (11)	– (Note: Gué-de-Sénac FC penalised for fielding more than two players transferred outside the transfer window, in breach of regulations. CO Coulouniex-Chamiers qualify. Original result 0–0 (1–3 p))	CO Coulouniex-Chamiers (9)
60.	Périgueux Foot (10)	3–5 (a.e.t.)	SC Bastidienne (10)
61.	Bouliacaise FC (10)	0–2	FC St Laurent d'Arce/St Gervais (8)
62.	CO St Genest d'Ambière (11)	2–4	FC Airvo St Jouin (10)
63.	ES Bocage (11)	2–1	AS St Léger Montbrillais (12)
64.	ES St Amand-sur-Sèvre (11)	0–3	US Vouillé (10)
65.	SA Mauzé-Rigné (11)	0–0 (5–4 p)	FC Cernay (11)
66.	ES Chanteloup-Chapelle (9)	0–6	CO Cerizay (8)
67.	AS Portugais Châtellerault (8)	4–1	FC Pays de l'Ouin (9)
68.	FC St Jean-Missé (11)	3–3 (4–1 p)	Antran SL (9)
69.	US Thuré-Besse (10)	1–6	FC Vrines (10)
70.	US St Varent Pierregeay (8)	2–3	US St Sauveur (8)
71.	ES Beaulieu-Breuil (10)	2–4	AS St Pierre-des-Échaubrognes (9)
72.	ES Fayenoirterre (11)	2–1	AS Coulonges-Thouarsais (10)
73.	US Combranssière (9)	5–2	Boivre SC (10)
74.	AS Coussay-les-Bois (11)	0–3	US Vrère-St Léger-de-Montbrun (10)
75.	ACS Mahorais 79 (11)	1–1 (6–7 p)	ES Pinbrécières (9)
76.	US Marigny St Léger (11)	3–1 (a.e.t.)	US Brion 79 (12)
77.	US Vergentonnaise (11)	1–0	ES La Pallu (11)
78.	US Nord Vienne (10)	2–0	FC Chiché (11)
79.	Espérance Availles-en-Châtellerault (10)	0–3	ES Aubinrorthais (8)
80.	Entente Voulmentin-St Aubin-du-Plain-La Coudre (11)	2–1	FC ASM (11)
81.	CS Dissay (12)	1–1 (3–5 p)	US La Crèche (10)
82.	CEP Poitiers (11)	3–0	AS Exoudun (12)
83.	US Lezay (10)	2–2 (5–4 p)	US Vivonne (10)
84.	Sud Vienne Région de Couhé (10)	2–3	Val de Boutonne Foot 79 (10)
85.	CA St Aubin-le-Cloud (10)	0–3	ES St Benoit (8)
86.	US Chey-Chenay-Sepvret (11)	2–8	ES Château-Larcher (9)
87.	US Jaunay-Clan (11)	3–1	ES Pays Thénezéen (10)
88.	FC Haute Val de Sèvre (11)	3–2 (a.e.t.)	FC Smarves 1936 (10)
89.	FC Jardres (12)	1–3	FC Boutonnais (10)
90.	SC L'Absie-Largeasse/Moutiers-sous-Chantmerle (11)	1–2	ACG Foot Sud 86 (10)
91.	US Vicq-sur-Gartempe (9)	2–1	EF Le Tallud (8)
92.	ES Mougon (12)	0–4	AS Sèvres-Anxaumont (10)
93.	ES Trois Cités Poitiers (8)	2–0	ASPTT Poitiers (9)
94.	AS Blanzay (13)	0–2	US Vasléenne (9)
95.	Bel Air Rocs OC Poitiers (11)	1–3	Avenir 79 FC (11)
96.	Croutelle FC (13)	2–2 (3–2 p)	ES Boismé-Clessé (11)
97.	AS Ste Néomaye-Romans (12)	0–3	ES Beaumont-St Cyr (8)
98.	ES Louzy (10)	3–0	Aunis AFC (9)
99.	AS Vérines (11)	0–4	AS Aiffres (8)
100.	FC Atlantique (9)	4–2	Stade Vouillé (9)
101.	US Mauzé-sur-le-Mignon (10)	0–3	AAAM Laleu-La Pallice (8)
102.	Espoir Haut Vals de Saintonge (12)	4–2	ASPTT Bessines (11)
103.	CS Beauvoir-sur-Niort (10)	3–1	US Aulnay (10)
104.	Buslaurs Thireuil (10)	1–0	AS Andilly (10)
105.	CS Venise Verte (11)	1–2	FC Nord 17 (8)
106.	US Champdeniers-Pamplie (11)	1–2	AS Maritime (8)
107.	AS Eymoutiers (10)	3–0	FREP St Germain (9)
108.	CA Chamboulive (10)	1–0	Creuse Avenir 2005 (10)
109.	AS La Jonchère-St Maurice (12)	2–3	US Versillacoise (10)
110.	JS Chambon-sur-Voueize (9)	2–2 (5–4 p)	CA Meymac (8)
111.	ES Beaubreuil (9)	4–1	SC Sardentais (9)
112.	USC Bourganeuf (9)	0–5	US Beaune-les-Mines (9)
113.	US Vallière (10)	0–3	AS Chamberet (8)
114.	CO Chénérailles (10)	0–2	US St Léonard-de-Noblat (8)
115.	AS Ambazac (9)	1–2	US Felletin (9)
116.	US St Clementoise (9)	5–2	US St Vaury (9)
117.	ES Bénévent-Marsac (10)	5–1	USS Mérinchal (9)
118.	Entente Troche-Vigeois (10)	1–1 (2–4 p)	Auvézère Mayne FC (9)
119.	Occitane FC (9)	2–5	JS Lafarge Limoges (8)
120.	FC St Brice-sur-Vienne (8)	1–0	CA Brantômois (8)
121.	FC Haute Charente (12)	1–6	USE Couzeix-Chaptelat (8)
122.	USA Condat-sur-Vienne (10)	3–8	FC Pays Mareuil (9)
123.	FC des 2 Vallées (10)	0–1	USA Montbronn (10)
124.	FC Charente Limousine (8)	2–2 (4–2 p)	Limoges Landouge (8)
125.	CA St Victurnien (10)	5–1	La Thibérienne (8)
126.	SC Verneuil-sur-Vienne (8)	8–1	Tour Sportive Merles Blanc (9)
127.	AS Limoges Roussillon (8)	4–4 (2–3 p)	AS Nontron-St Pardoux (8)
128.	AS Cabariot (8)	6–0	Coqs Rouges Mansle (9)
129.	AS Aigre (10)	3–1 (a.e.t.)	ALFC Fontcouverte (10)
130.	AS Mons (11)	0–9	Rochefort FC (8)
131.	AL St Brice (10)	1–3 (a.e.t.)	ES Thénacaise (9)
132.	Échillais-St Agnant-Beaugeay FC (10)	0–5	ASFC Vindelle (10)
133.	CS St Angeau (11)	0–1	St Palais SF (8)
134.	Avenir Matha (9)	2–1	ES Champniers (9)
135.	ASV Malemort (9)	2–1	FRJEP Cornil (9)
136.	FC Coly (12)	2–11	US Riveraine Mansacoise (11)
137.	FC Excideuil-St Médard (11)	1–3	FC Objat (11)
138.	US Bachellière (11)	0–3	AS Laguenne-Ste Fortunade-Lagarde-Enval (9)
139.	Amicale St Hilaire-Venarsal (9)	0–1 (a.e.t.)	ES Montignacoise (8)
140.	APCS Mahorais Brive (11)	1–1 (3–2 p)	Cosnac FC (10)
141.	US Hautefort (11)	3–6 (a.e.t.)	ES Nonards (8)
142.	FC Belvesois (11)	0–3	SS Ste Féréole (9)
143.	US La Roche l'Abeille (10)	0–5	FC Argentat (8)
144.	AS Nexon (10)	2–2 (3–1 p)	Olympique Larche Lafeuillade (8)
145.	AS Villac (12)	2–3	ES Ussac (9)
146.	AL Poey-de-Lescar (8)	1–2 (a.e.t.)	SA St Séverin (8)
147.	FC Lacajunte-Tursan (9)	– (Note: FA Bourbaki Pau penalised for fielding a suspended player. FC Lacajunte-Tursan qualify. Original result 1–3.)	FA Bourbaki Pau (8)
148.	US Portugais Pau (8)	0–1	Violette Aturine (8)
149.	Entente Haut Béarn (11)	0–2	JAB Pau (9)
150.	US Marsan (9)	2–3	AS Mazères-Uzos-Rontignan (8)
151.	FC Vallée de l'Ousse (9)	5–2	AS Bretagne-de-Marsan (10)
152.	FC Hagetmautien (8)	2–0	USV Gelosienne (9)
153.	ES Nay-Vath-Vielha (10)	3–0	FC St Avit (11)
154.	SA Mauléonais (8)	0–0 (1–4 p)	Bleuets Pau (8)
155.	Entente St Martin-Geloux (10)	0–5	Union Jurançonnaise (9)
156.	FC des Enclaves et du Plateau (10)	2–1	FC Gan (10)
157.	Ciboure FC (11)	1–6	Seignosse-Capbreton-Soustons FC (8)
158.	JS Labouheyre (11)	2–2 (5–4 p)	US St Palais (9)
159.	FC Mées (11)	0–7	FC Luy du Béarn (8)
160.	Espérance Oeyreluy (10)	1–3	Ardanavy FC (11)
161.	Peyrehorade SF (11)	0–1	FC Oloronais (9)
162.	AS Lous Marous/FC St Geours (10)	1–0	AS des Églantines de Hendaye (10)
163.	US Castétis-Gouze (10)	1–1 (6–5 p)	AS Tarnos (8)
164.	ES Pyrénéene (10)	2–5	CA Morcenx (8)
165.	Carresse Salies FC (10)	1–3	JA Dax (8)
166.	FREP St Vincent-de-Paul (9)	2–3 (a.e.t.)	Pardies Olympique (8)
167.	JS Laluque-Rion (10)	1–3	FC St Martin-de-Seignanx (9)
168.	FC Artiguelouve-Arbus-Aubertin (10)	2–0	SC Arthez-Lacq-Audéjos (9)
169.	Stade Pessacais UC (10)	3–2 (a.e.t.)	FC Belin-Béliet (8)
170.	CS Lantonnais (10)	4–1	FC Gradignan (10)
171.	Cazaux Olympique (9)	0–3	RC Chambéry (9)
172.	CS Portugais Villenave-d'Ornon (9)	2–4	AS Facture-Biganos Boïens (8)
173.	ES Canéjan (9)	1–1 (5–4 p)	JS Teichoise (9)
174.	AGJA Caudéran (9)	3–6	FC Martignas-Illac (8)
175.	AS Beautiran (10)	0–4	Andernos Sport FC (8)
176.	Montesquieu FC (8)	1–0	ES Bruges (9)
177.	SC Astaffortais (11)	0–2	Sud Gironde FC (10)
178.	US Lamothe-Mongauzy (10)	2–2 (5–3 p)	FC Bias (9)
179.	US Aillas-Auros (11)	1–5	FC Nérac (8)
180.	Joyeuse Savignac (10)	1–6	AS Marcellus-Cocumont (9)
181.	ES Verdelais-St Maixent-Semens (11)	0–9	AF Casseneuil-Pailloles-Lédat (8)
182.	SC St Symphorien (9)	6–3	Tonneins FC (10)
183.	US Farguaise (10)	0–1	US Gontaud (9)
184.	Mas AC (9)	2–1	US Illadaise (9)
185.	US Port Ste Marie-Feugarolles (9)	2–6	Patronage Bazadais (8)
186.	SU Agen (9)	0–1 (a.e.t.)	Entente Boé Bon-Encontre (8)
187.	CA Castets-en-Dorthe (11)	0–3	ES Mazères-Roaillan (10)
188.	FC Roquefort (11)	0–3	FC Pont-du-Casse-Foulayronnes (9)
189.	AS Villandraut-Préchac (10)	0–4	CA Pondaurat (8)
190.	AS Miramont-Lavergne (11)	1–2	FC Monbazillac-Sigoules (10)
191.	AS Franco-Portugais St Pardoux (12)	0–12	Targon-Soulignac FC (8)
192.	US Bazeillaise (11)	2–0	AS Sauveterrienne (11)
193.	Pays de l'Eyraud (11)	1–0	AS Côteaux Dordogne (9)
194.	FC Faux (9)	0–0 (5–4 p)	FC Gironde La Réole (10)
195.	JS St Christophe-de-Double (11)	1–0	US Creysse-Lembras (10)
196.	FC Loubesien (10)	3–1	FC Pays Beaumontois (9)
197.	CA Carbon-Blanc (10)	1–2	ES Fléac (11)
198.	Stade Blayais (11)	3–4 (a.e.t.)	JS Grande Champagne (10)
199.	ES Linars (9)	0–2	USJ St Augustin Club Pyrénées Aquitaine (10)
200.	US St Martin (11)	0–4	AS Taillan (8)
201.	US Baignes (9)	2–0	CA Parempuyre (10)
202.	Union St Bruno (9)	4–0	JS Basseau Angoulême (9)
203.	FC St Vivien-de-Médoc (12)	2–8	AS Puymoyen (8)
204.	CM Floirac (9)	2–0	JS Semussac (9)
205.	Sporting Chantecler Bordeaux Nord le Lac (9)	1–4	CS St Michel-sur-Charente (10)
206.	AS Le Haillan (10)	1–0	Stade Pauillacais FC (8)
207.	US Ludonnaise (10)	0–3	FC Roullet-St Estèphe (9)
208.	AS Salles-d'Angles (11)	0–3	FC Pessac Alouette (9)
209.	SJ Macaudaise (9)	1–1 (2–4 p)	FC Montendre (10)
210.	Bordeaux Étudiants CF (10)	1–4	US La Gémoze (10)
211.	Cocarde OS St Laurent-Médoc (9)	0–2	FC Côteaux Bourgeais (8)
212.	AS Avensan-Moulis-Listrac (10)	0–2	FC Sévigné Jonzac-St Germain (9)
213.	ES Ambares (8)	2–0	UF Barbezieux-Barret (8)
214.	CO La Couronne (8)	2–1	FC Arsac-Pian Médoc (8)
215.	AS Mignaloux-Beauvoir (8)	3–0	FC Fleuré (8)
216.	CS Chatain (12)	2–2 (1–3 p)	US Leignes-sur-Fontaine (11)
217.	AS Persac (14)	0–4	ES Charroux-Mauprévoir (12)
218.	US Abzac (11)	3–1	US Payroux (11)
219.	CS L'Espinasse Chauvigny (13)	0–7	US Nantiat (10)
220.	AAS St Julien-l'Ars (10)	3–2 (a.e.t.)	US Lessac (10)
221.	FC Usson-Isle (10)	11–0	Entente St Maurice-Gençay (11)
222.	AS Laurentine (11)	2–7	Clérac-Orignolles-St Martin-du-Lary (10)
223.	US Nord Gironde (10)	2–1	USA St Aigulin (10)
224.	FC Sud Charente (10)	1–0	US Tocane-St Apre (11)
225.	US Mussidan-St Medard (8)	3–0	FC Côteaux Libournais (8)
226.	Les Epis de Montanceix-Montrem (11)	1–4	Joyeuse St Sulpice-et-Cameyrac (8)
227.	FC Pineuilh (12)	0–8	AS Neuvic St Léon (9)
228.	SA Sanilhacois (10)	2–0	AS Gensac-Montcaret (8)
229.	Les Aiglons Razacois (10)	2–0	US St Denis-de-Pile (9)
230.	JS Castellevequois (9)	1–4	ES Fronsadaise (9)
231.	SC Monségur (10)	1–3	AS Lusitanos Cenon (10)
232.	RC Laurence (10)	3–0	US Lagorce (11)
233.	FC Côteaux Bordelais (8)	4–0	US Cenon Rive Droite (8)
234.	US Artiguaise (10)	2–6	SJ Yvrac (10)

== Second round ==
These matches were played on 1 and 2 September 2018, with one tie replayed on 9 September 2018.

Second round results: Nouvelle Aquitaine
Tie no	Home team (tier)	Score	Away team (tier)
1.	ACG Foot Sud 86 (10)	1–2	AS Nieul (7)
2.	ES La Rochelle (6)	0–1	UA Niort St Florent (7)
3.	JS Labouheyre (11)	2–4	Bleuets Pau (8)
4.	FC Luy du Béarn (8)	3–2	FC Lescar (7)
5.	Patronage Bazadais (8)	2–1 (a.e.t.)	Hiriburuko Ainhara (6)
6.	US Donzenac (7)	2–3	AS Jugeals-Noailles (8)
7.	FA Morlaàs Est Béarn (7)	1–0	FC Doazit (8)
8.	FC Parentis (10)	4–0	FC Vallée de l'Ousse (9)
9.	St Paul Sport (7)	2–1	JA Biarritz (7)
10.	Les Labourdins d'Ustaritz (9)	4–0	Sud Gironde FC (10)
11.	FC Oloronais (9)	1–2	AS Mazères-Uzos-Rontignan (8)
12.	ES Meillon-Assat-Narcastet (8)	2–0	AS Pontonx (8)
13.	JAB Pau (9)	0–2	Violette Aturine (8)
14.	Colayrac FC (7)	0–2	FC des Graves (7)
15.	FC Monbazillac-Sigoules (10)	2–3 (a.e.t.)	US Lamothe-Mongauzy (10)
16.	US Gontaud (9)	0–3	FC Grand St Emilionnais (7)
17.	AS Marcellus-Cocumont (9)	2–3 (a.e.t.)	Jeunesse Villenave (6)
18.	FC Médoc Côte d'Argent (8)	1–0	Joyeuse St Sulpice-et-Cameyrac (8)
19.	St Palais SF (8)	4–3	FC Côteaux Bordelais (8)
20.	Nersac FC (9)	3–1	US Nord Gironde (10)
21.	FC Sévigné Jonzac-St Germain (9)	2–3	CS Lantonnais (10)
22.	FC Côteaux Bourgeais (8)	1–5	FC Lesparre Médoc (9)
23.	Royan Vaux AFC (6)	1–0	SA Mérignac (7)
24.	FC Roullet-St Estèphe (9)	4–3	SJ Yvrac (10)
25.	AS Facture-Biganos Boïens (8)	3–1	Jarnac SF (7)
26.	FC Sud Charente (10)	2–1 (a.e.t.)	FC Loubesien (10)
27.	US La Gémoze (10)	2–1	FC Estuaire Haute Gironde (7)
28.	ES Thénacaise (9)	0–4	FC Bassin d'Arcachon (6)
29.	US Lormont (6)	5–1	ES Saintes (7)
30.	USA Montbronn (10)	1–5	US Mussidan-St Medard (8)
31.	US Anais (11)	2–4	Limens JSA (8)
32.	CO Coulouniex-Chamiers (9)	1–2 (a.e.t.)	ASFC Vindelle (10)
33.	Tardoire FC La Roche/Rivières (8)	1–5	ES Boulazac (6)
34.	AS Pays de Montaigne et Gurçon (9)	1–3	CS St Michel-sur-Charente (10)
35.	FC Cendrieux-La Douze (9)	3–2	CO La Couronne (8)
36.	CA Ribéracois (9)	4–1	AS Soyaux (7)
37.	La Ligugéenne Football (7)	7–0	ES Nouaillé (8)
38.	SC Verrières (10)	5–1	US Le Dorat (10)
39.	US Nantiat (10)	5–2	ES Château-Larcher (9)
40.	Fontafie FC (11)	3–1	FC Montamisé (9)
41.	ES St Benoit (8)	2–3	FC Charente Limousine (8)
42.	US Frontenay-St Symphorien (10)	3–0	AS Maritime (8)
43.	FC Boutonnais (10)	2–2 (6–5 p)	AS Cabariot (8)
44.	US Pays Maixentais (10)	2–1	Capaunis ASPTT FC (7)
45.	Val de Boutonne Foot 79 (10)	2–4	Aviron Boutonnais (9)
46.	SC St Jean-d'Angély (6)	5–1	AS Réthaise (7)
47.	Canton Aunis FC (10)	0–5	OL St Liguaire Niort (6)
48.	Rochefort FC (8)	5–2 (a.e.t.)	Stade Ruffec (7)
49.	Gati-Foot (10)	0–3	CA Neuville (6)
50.	US Envigne (10)	0–9	Thouars Foot 79 (6)
51.	FC Airvo St Jouin (10)	1–3 (a.e.t.)	US Migné-Auxances (7)
52.	AS Ingrandes (11)	0–4	US St Sauveur (8)
53.	US Meyrals (11)	0–6	AS Aixoise (7)
54.	ASPTT Limoges (10)	1–5	CS Boussac (7)
55.	JS Lafarge Limoges (8)	2–0	JS Chambon-sur-Voueize (9)
56.	US St Léonard-de-Noblat (8)	4–1	Auvézère Mayne FC (9)
57.	FC Argentat (8)	3–4	AS Rouffignac-Plazac (8)
58.	USE Couzeix-Chaptelat (8)	2–2 (7–6 p)	SC Verneuil-sur-Vienne (8)
59.	ES Ussel (8)	1–2	AS Panazol (8)
60.	ES Nonards (8)	6–2	ES Beaubreuil (9)
61.	SA Le Palais-sur-Vienne (7)	0–1	Tulle Football Corrèze (6)
62.	AS Laguenne-Ste Fortunade-Lagarde-Enval (9)	1–2 (a.e.t.)	CS Feytiat (6)
63.	FC Artiguelouve-Arbus-Aubertin (10)	3–0	Biscarrosse OFC (7)
64.	Croisés St André Bayonne (7)	0–1	FC Hagetmautien (8)
65.	CA Morcenx (8)	2–1 (a.e.t.)	Union Jurançonnaise (9)
66.	FC des Enclaves et du Plateau (10)	0–2	Seignosse-Capbreton-Soustons FC (8)
67.	Pardies Olympique (8)	0–0 (3–5 p)	FC Tartas-St Yaguen (6)
68.	US Castétis-Gouze (10)	1–4	ES Montoise (8)
69.	SA St Séverin (8)	4–1	FC La Ribère (8)
70.	SC St Symphorien (9)	1–2	Arin Luzien (6)
71.	AS Lous Marous/FC St Geours (10)	0–3	AS Artix (7)
72.	Ardanavy FC (11)	1–2	FC Lacajunte-Tursan (9)
73.	ES Nay-Vath-Vielha (10)	0–2	Stade Ygossais (8)
74.	FC St Martin-de-Seignanx (9)	1–8	Élan Béarnaise Orthez (6)
75.	SC St Pierre-du-Mont (7)	1–2	Hasparren FC (7)
76.	Elan Boucalais (7)	2–0	JA Dax (8)
77.	FC Pessac Alouette (8)	2–3	Montesquieu FC (8)
78.	US La Catte (7)	5–2	Targon-Soulignac FC (8)
79.	ES Mazères-Roaillan (10)	0–1	FC Nérac (8)
80.	US Bazeillaise (11)	0–14	FC Libourne (6)
81.	US Virazeil-Puymiclan (9)	3–4	CM Floirac (9)
82.	Confluent Football 47 (8)	2–0	RC Chambéry (9)
83.	FC Faux (9)	1–2	RC Bordeaux Métropole (7)
84.	Mas AC (9)	0–3	Stade St Médardais (7)
85.	La Brède FC (6)	2–0	Prigonrieux FC (7)
86.	Entente Boé Bon-Encontre (8)	2–1	FC Izon-Vayres (7)
87.	SC Bastidienne (10)	4–2	Pays de l'Eyraud (11)
88.	CA Pondaurat (8)	0–3	FC Marmande 47 (6)
89.	AF Casseneuil-Pailloles-Lédat (8)	2–3 (a.e.t.)	CA Béglais (7)
90.	Langon FC (6)	3–1 (a.e.t.)	FC Vallée du Lot (7)
91.	FC Pont-du-Casse-Foulayronnes (9)	3–1	Fraternelle Landiras (9)
92.	RC Laurence (10)	1–4	ES Ambares (8)
93.	AS Lusitanos Cenon (10)	1–3	US Alliance Talençaise (7)
94.	US Baignes (9)	0–9	ES Blanquefort (7)
95.	Union St Bruno (9)	2–1	JS Sireuil (8)
96.	FC Montendre (10)	1–1 (4–3 p)	AS Taillan (8)
97.	JS St Christophe-de-Double (11)	2–3	AS Cozes (6)
98.	US Coutras (10)	3–1	JS Grande Champagne (10)
99.	ES Audenge (7)	3–0	FC Martignas-Illac (8)
100.	AS Le Haillan (10)	4–1	ES Eysinaise (8)
101.	ES Canéjan (9)	0–4	FC St André-de-Cubzac (8)
102.	CA Ste Hélène (8)	1–5	UA Cognac (6)
103.	AS Merpins (8)	0–1	FC St Médard-en-Jalles (6)
104.	FC St Laurent d'Arce/St Gervais (8)	0–5	US Bouscataise (8)
105.	Stade Pessacais UC (10)	1–2	FC Barpais (9)
106.	USJ St Augustin Club Pyrénées Aquitaine (10)	3–2	CMO Bassens (9)
107.	ES Fronsadaise (9)	3–0	Clérac-Orignolles-St Martin-du-Lary (10)
108.	ES Fléac (11)	1–2	US St Vincent-de-Connezac (10)
109.	Les Aiglons Razacois (10)	2–5	AS St Junien (8)
110.	Montpon-Ménesplet FC (8)	5–0	FC St Brice-sur-Vienne (8)
111.	AS Nontron-St Pardoux (8)	0–2	OFC Ruelle (7)
112.	CA St Victurnien (10)	2–3	AS Antonne-Le Change (7)
113.	SA Sanilhacois (10)	2–3	CS Leroy Angoulême (7)
114.	AS Neuvic St Léon (9)	1–0	AS St Yrieix (8)
115.	AS Puymoyen (8)	2–0	FC Pays Mareuil (9)
116.	US Leignes-sur-Fontaine (11)	4–1	AS Sèvres-Anxaumont (10)
117.	Croutelle FC (13)	0–4	ES Buxerolles (7)
118.	ES Charroux-Mauprévoir (12)	0–4	CA St Savin-St Germain (7)
119.	US Versillacoise (10)	2–3	CEP Poitiers (11)
120.	AAS St Julien-l'Ars (10)	7–0	US Chasseneuil (11)
121.	FC Usson-Isle (10)	4–1	ES Marchoise (7)
122.	ES Brion-St Secondin (10)	2–4	Avenir Bellac-Berneuil-St Junien-les-Combes (8)
123.	US Marigny St Léger (11)	5–3 (Note: Original match abandoned, with the scoreline 1–1 after a serious injury to a FC Confolentais player. Replayed on 9 September.)	FC Confolentais (9)
124.	AS Mignaloux-Beauvoir (8)	4–0	US Bessines-Morterolles (9)
125.	FC Fontaine-le-Comte (8)	6–0	US Beaune-les-Mines (9)
126.	US Abzac (11)	2–1	ES Trois Cités Poitiers (8)
127.	EFC DB2S (10)	1–0	AS Portugais Niort (7)
128.	FC Atlantique (9)	4–4 (4–3 p)	UAS Verdille (10)
129.	AS Aigre (10)	2–2 (4–3 p)	US Marennaise (8)
130.	CS Beauvoir-sur-Niort (10)	3–3 (1–3 p)	La Jarrie FC (10)
131.	US Lezay (10)	1–0	Oléron FC (8)
132.	US La Crèche (10)	1–2	AAAM Laleu-La Pallice (8)
133.	FC Haute Val de Sèvre (11)	1–3	FC Périgny (7)
134.	FC Canton de Courçon (11)	0–3	ES Celles-Verrines (8)
135.	AS Aiffres (8)	0–1	Avenir Matha (9)
136.	Avenir 79 FC (11)	2–1	FC Nord 17 (8)
137.	AS Échiré St Gelais (6)	3–0	La Rochelle Villeneuve FC (7)
138.	Espoir Haut Vals de Saintonge (12)	2–5	AS Pays Mellois (9)
139.	US Vrère-St Léger-de-Montbrun (10)	2–0	RC Parthenay Viennay (8)
140.	Buslaurs Thireuil (10)	1–4	ES Aubinrorthais (8)
141.	ES Pinbrécières (9)	0–2 (a.e.t.)	ES Louzy (10)
142.	ES Fayenoirterre (11)	2–1	US Vergentonnaise (11)
143.	SA Mauzé-Rigné (11)	1–2 (a.e.t.)	CO Cerizay (8)
144.	FC Vrines (10)	6–2 (a.e.t.)	US Vicq-sur-Gartempe (9)
145.	AS St Pierre-des-Échaubrognes (9)	1–3	ES Beaumont-St Cyr (8)
146.	US Nord Vienne (10)	2–1	US Combranssière (9)
147.	FC Nueillaubiers (6)	1–1 (10–9 p)	CS Naintré (7)
148.	FC Pays Argentonnais (9)	1–6	SO Châtellerault (6)
149.	ES Bocage (11)	3–0	SL Cenon-sur-Vienne (10)
150.	US Vouillé (10)	4–0	FC St Jean-Missé (11)
151.	AS Portugais Châtellerault (8)	3–2	Espérance Terves (8)
152.	US Jaunay-Clan (11)	5–2	SA Moncoutant (7)
153.	Entente Voulmentin-St Aubin-du-Plain-La Coudre (11)	0–1	US Vasléenne (9)
154.	US Felletin (9)	2–0	AS Chamberet (8)
155.	ES Bénévent-Marsac (10)	2–0	AS Châteauneuf-Neuvic (8)
156.	SS Ste Féréole (9)	0–2	ES Guérétoise (6)
157.	ES Montignacoise (8)	5–3	CA Égletons (9)
158.	FC Objat (11)	0–5	FC Thenon-Limeyrat-Fossemagne (8)
159.	US Riveraine Mansacoise (11)	0–5	AS Gouzon (7)
160.	APCS Mahorais Brive (11)	0–3	EF Aubussonnais (7)
161.	US St Clementoise (9)	0–6	ESA Brive (7)
162.	ES Ussac (9)	2–5	AS St Pantaleon (7)
163.	CA Chamboulive (10)	0–2	CA Rilhac-Rancon (8)
164.	Amicale Franco-Portugais Limoges (7)	4–0	FC Sarlat-Marcillac (8)
165.	AS Eymoutiers (10)	5–2	ASV Malemort (9)
166.	AS Nexon (10)	0–6	JA Isle (6)
167.	FC des Portes de l'Entre-Deux-Mers (6)	1–1 (7–6 p)	Coqs Rouges Bordeaux (7)
168.	Landes Girondines FC (7)	4–6 (a.e.t.)	Andernos Sport FC (8)

== Third round ==
These matches were played on 15 and 16 September 2018.

Third round results: Nouvelle Aquitaine
Tie no	Home team (tier)	Score	Away team (tier)
1.	ES Louzy (10)	0–2	Stade Poitevin FC (5)
2.	Genêts Anglet (5)	2–1	Élan Béarnaise Orthez (6)
3.	ESA Brive (7)	4–1 (a.e.t.)	FC Charente Limousine (8)
4.	FC Roullet-St Estèphe (9)	0–1	FC St Médard-en-Jalles (6)
5.	FC Lacajunte-Tursan (9)	1–0	Patronage Bazadais (8)
6.	FC Sud Charente (10)	2–1 (a.e.t.)	AS Puymoyen (8)
7.	US La Gémoze (10)	0–2	US Lormont (6)
8.	ES Montoise (8)	2–1	SA St Séverin (8)
9.	AS Rouffignac-Plazac (8)	3–0	CM Floirac (9)
10.	FC Cendrieux-La Douze (9)	0–1	AS Antonne-Le Change (7)
11.	Seignosse-Capbreton-Soustons FC (8)	6–3	CA Morcenx (8)
12.	FC Nérac (8)	0–2	Jeunesse Villenave (6)
13.	US St Vincent-de-Connezac (10)	1–3	CA Béglais (7)
14.	ES Montignacoise (8)	0–1	FC Pont-du-Casse-Foulayronnes (9)
15.	Bleuets Pau (8)	0–1	Arin Luzien (6)
16.	ES Meillon-Assat-Narcastet (8)	0–2	FC Bassin d'Arcachon (6)
17.	FC St André-de-Cubzac (8)	0–3	US Bouscataise (8)
18.	Violette Aturine (8)	2–3	Aviron Bayonnais FC (5)
19.	FC Barpais (9)	0–2	Langon FC (6)
20.	FC Parentis (10)	1–4	Hasparren FC (7)
21.	Les Labourdins d'Ustaritz (9)	0–2	Elan Boucalais (7)
22.	FC Médoc Côte d'Argent (8)	3–0	AS Facture-Biganos Boïens (8)
23.	Aviron Boutonnais (9)	0–3	FC Périgny (7)
24.	ES Celles-Verrines (8)	0–3	CA St Savin-St Germain (7)
25.	US Pays Maixentais (10)	2–3	UES Montmorillon (5)
26.	US Frontenay-St Symphorien (10)	0–3	CS Leroy Angoulême (7)
27.	CS St Michel-sur-Charente (10)	1–6	UA Cognac (6)
28.	US Chauvigny (5)	2–0	SC St Jean-d'Angély (6)
29.	FC Boutonnais (10)	1–3	SC Verrières (10)
30.	CA Neuville (6)	2–0 (a.e.t.)	Thouars Foot 79 (6)
31.	La Jarrie FC (10)	4–3 (a.e.t.)	UA Niort St Florent (7)
32.	JS Lafarge Limoges (8)	1–3	ES Guérétoise (6)
33.	St Palais SF (8)	0–3	US Lège Cap Ferret (5)
34.	US Nantiat (10)	0–1	US St Léonard-de-Noblat (8)
35.	USE Couzeix-Chaptelat (8)	2–2 (4–3 p)	US Felletin (9)
36.	Fontafie FC (11)	0–1	CS Feytiat (6)
37.	CS Boussac (7)	0–0 (4–2 p)	AS Panazol (8)
38.	CA Rilhac-Rancon (8)	0–2	JA Isle (6)
39.	AS Gouzon (7)	3–0 (Note: Tie won by forfeit.)	ES Nonards (8)
40.	Avenir Bellac-Berneuil-St Junien-les-Combes (8)	3–4 (a.e.t.)	AS Nieul (7)
41.	ES Fronsadaise (9)	1–2 (a.e.t.)	CA Ribéracois (9)
42.	USJ St Augustin Club Pyrénées Aquitaine (10)	1–3	Royan Vaux AFC (6)
43.	Andernos Sport FC (8)	0–6	FCE Mérignac Arlac (5)
44.	CS Lantonnais (10)	2–1	Union St Bruno (9)
45.	SC Bastidienne (10)	1–13	Angoulême CFC (5)
46.	RC Bordeaux Métropole (7)	1–5	ES Ambares (8)
47.	ES Audenge (7)	2–1 (a.e.t.)	SAG Cestas (5)
48.	FC Lesparre Médoc (9)	2–0	FC Montendre (10)
49.	AS Cozes (6)	4–1	ES Blanquefort (7)
50.	AS Le Haillan (10)	1–3	US Alliance Talençaise (7)
51.	ES Bénévent-Marsac (10)	0–3	AS St Junien (8)
52.	Limens JSA (8)	3–2	Entente Boé Bon-Encontre (8)
53.	Stade St Médardais (7)	0–3	FC Marmande 47 (6)
54.	US Lamothe-Mongauzy (10)	1–3	FC Thenon-Limeyrat-Fossemagne (8)
55.	FC Artiguelouve-Arbus-Aubertin (10)	2–1	Stade Ygossais (8)
56.	AS Mazères-Uzos-Rontignan (8)	3–0	FC Luy du Béarn (8)
57.	FC Hagetmautien (8)	3–1	St Paul Sport (7)
58.	FC Tartas-St Yaguen (6)	1–0	FA Morlaàs Est Béarn (7)
59.	US La Catte (7)	3–4	La Brède FC (6)
60.	Montesquieu FC (8)	1–2 (a.e.t.)	FC des Portes de l'Entre-Deux-Mers (6)
61.	US Coutras (10)	0–4	FC Grand St Emilionnais (7)
62.	Montpon-Ménesplet FC (8)	2–3 (a.e.t.)	FC Libourne (6)
63.	AS Neuvic St Léon (9)	0–5	ES Boulazac (6)
64.	US Mussidan-St Medard (8)	3–2	Confluent Football 47 (8)
65.	AS Artix (7)	1–0	FC des Graves (7)
66.	AS St Pantaleon (7)	1–3	AS Jugeals-Noailles (8)
67.	ES Fayenoirterre (11)	0–2	US Migné-Auxances (7)
68.	AS Mignaloux-Beauvoir (8)	0–1	AS Échiré St Gelais (6)
69.	US Nord Vienne (10)	1–2	US St Sauveur (8)
70.	US Vrère-St Léger-de-Montbrun (10)	0–2	ES Buxerolles (7)
71.	US Leignes-sur-Fontaine (11)	1–2	ES Bocage (11)
72.	FC Vrines (10)	2–3	SO Châtellerault (6)
73.	ES Beaumont-St Cyr (8)	0–0 (5–3 p)	CO Cerizay (8)
74.	Avenir 79 FC (11)	0–1	La Ligugéenne Football (7)
75.	US Jaunay-Clan (11)	0–0 (2–3 p)	US Vasléenne (9)
76.	ES Aubinrorthais (8)	1–4	AS Portugais Châtellerault (8)
77.	US Vouillé (10)	1–4	FC Nueillaubiers (6)
78.	CEP Poitiers (11)	0–4	FC Bressuire (5)
79.	Avenir Matha (9)	5–0	AAS St Julien-l'Ars (10)
80.	US Abzac (11)	0–6	EF Aubussonnais (7)
81.	Amicale Franco-Portugais Limoges (7)	0–9	Limoges FC (5)
82.	US Marigny St Léger (11)	0–7	Tulle Football Corrèze (6)
83.	AS Eymoutiers (10)	0–4	AS Aixoise (7)
84.	US Lezay (10)	0–4	FC Chauray (5)
85.	AAAM Laleu-La Pallice (8)	2–1	OFC Ruelle (7)
86.	ASFC Vindelle (10)	2–1	FC Usson-Isle (10)
87.	EFC DB2S (10)	2–0	FC Atlantique (9)
88.	AS Aigre (10)	1–3	Rochefort FC (8)
89.	AS Pays Mellois (9)	4–0	Nersac FC (9)
90.	FC Fontaine-le-Comte (8)	0–2	OL St Liguaire Niort (6)

== Fourth round ==
These matches were played on 29 and 30 September 2018.

Fourth round results: Nouvelle Aquitaine
Tie no	Home team (tier)	Score	Away team (tier)
1.	La Ligugéenne Football (7)	0–3	Trélissac FC (4)
2.	ES Beaumont-St Cyr (8)	0–1	FC Chauray (5)
3.	FC Périgny (7)	0–2	FC Nueillaubiers (6)
4.	CA St Savin-St Germain (7)	0–3	SO Châtellerault (6)
5.	US St Sauveur (8)	2–4	Stade Poitevin FC (5)
6.	ES Buxerolles (7)	2–3	UA Cognac (6)
7.	AS Échiré St Gelais (6)	2–0	Royan Vaux AFC (6)
8.	SC Verrières (10)	2–1	US Vasléenne (9)
9.	ES Bocage (11)	0–9	FC Bressuire (5)
10.	US Migné-Auxances (7)	0–1	OL St Liguaire Niort (6)
11.	AS Portugais Châtellerault (8)	3–0	AS Cozes (6)
12.	AS Pays Mellois (9)	0–4	CA Neuville (6)
13.	EFC DB2S (10)	0–2	AAAM Laleu-La Pallice (8)
14.	CS Lantonnais (10)	0–7	Angoulême CFC (5)
15.	US Mussidan-St Medard (8)	2–3 (a.e.t.)	FC Libourne (6)
16.	ASFC Vindelle (10)	1–2 (a.e.t.)	La Jarrie FC (10)
17.	FC Sud Charente (10)	0–8	Jeunesse Villenave (6)
18.	CA Béglais (7)	0–0 (0–3 p)	FCE Mérignac Arlac (5)
19.	FC Grand St Emilionnais (7)	1–1 (4–1 p)	FC des Portes de l'Entre-Deux-Mers (6)
20.	Avenir Matha (9)	0–2	Stade Bordelais (4)
21.	ES Ambares (8)	1–1 (5–6 p)	ES Audenge (7)
22.	CS Leroy Angoulême (7)	0–3	US Lormont (6)
23.	FC St Médard-en-Jalles (6)	1–1 (3–4 p)	US Alliance Talençaise (7)
24.	Rochefort FC (8)	3–1 (a.e.t.)	US Bouscataise (8)
25.	ESA Brive (7)	1–2	Bergerac Périgord FC (4)
26.	US St Léonard-de-Noblat (8)	1–3	FC Thenon-Limeyrat-Fossemagne (8)
27.	CS Boussac (7)	0–3	AS Rouffignac-Plazac (8)
28.	USE Couzeix-Chaptelat (8)	1–2	Limoges FC (5)
29.	AS St Junien (8)	0–7	US Chauvigny (5)
30.	ES Boulazac (6)	0–2	JA Isle (6)
31.	AS Aixoise (7)	1–3 (a.e.t.)	UES Montmorillon (5)
32.	ES Guérétoise (6)	4–0	AS Nieul (7)
33.	EF Aubussonnais (7)	3–1	AS Antonne-Le Change (7)
34.	AS Jugeals-Noailles (8)	3–0	CA Ribéracois (9)
35.	Tulle Football Corrèze (6)	2–1	AS Gouzon (7)
36.	Limens JSA (8)	0–2 (a.e.t.)	CS Feytiat (6)
37.	FC Marmande 47 (6)	0–0 (5–4 p)	FC Bassin d'Arcachon (6)
38.	Aviron Bayonnais FC (5)	2–0	Langon FC (6)
39.	AS Artix (7)	0–1 (a.e.t.)	Genêts Anglet (5)
40.	FC Lesparre Médoc (9)	0–3	La Brède FC (6)
41.	AS Mazères-Uzos-Rontignan (8)	0–2	Stade Montois (4)
42.	Seignosse-Capbreton-Soustons FC (8)	3–1	FC Hagetmautien (8)
43.	FC Pont-du-Casse-Foulayronnes (9)	2–3 (a.e.t.)	FC Artiguelouve-Arbus-Aubertin (10)
44.	ES Montoise (8)	0–2	FC Tartas-St Yaguen (6)
45.	FC Médoc Côte d'Argent (8)	1–1 (3–4 p)	Arin Luzien (6)
46.	Elan Boucalais (7)	1–3 (a.e.t.)	US Lège Cap Ferret (5)
47.	FC Lacajunte-Tursan (9)	0–1	Hasparren FC (7)

== Fifth round ==
These matches were played on 12, 13 and 14 October 2018.

Fifth round results: Nouvelle Aquitaine
Tie no	Home team (tier)	Score	Away team (tier)
1.	SO Châtellerault (6)	3–0	UA Cognac (6)
2.	Hasparren FC (7)	1–3	FCE Mérignac Arlac (5)
3.	FC Marmande 47 (6)	0–4	Pau FC (3)
4.	Jeunesse Villenave (6)	1–2	US Alliance Talençaise (7)
5.	US Lège Cap Ferret (5)	0–0 (4–1 p)	Stade Montois (4)
6.	Seignosse-Capbreton-Soustons FC (8)	1–3	Aviron Bayonnais FC (5)
7.	US Lormont (6)	2–0	EF Aubussonnais (7)
8.	Limoges FC (5)	2–2 (5–4 p)	UES Montmorillon (5)
9.	AS Jugeals-Noailles (8)	0–1	FC Grand St Emilionnais (7)
10.	AS Rouffignac-Plazac (8)	0–2	CS Feytiat (6)
11.	FC Libourne (6)	1–0	Stade Bordelais (4)
12.	FC Bressuire (5)	0–1 (a.e.t.)	FC Chauray (5)
13.	SC Verrières (10)	0–1	Rochefort FC (8)
14.	La Jarrie FC (10)	2–0	FC Nueillaubiers (6)
15.	CA Neuville (6)	2–0	AS Échiré St Gelais (6)
16.	FC Thenon-Limeyrat-Fossemagne (8)	1–4	US Chauvigny (5)
17.	JA Isle (6)	0–3	Bergerac Périgord FC (4)
18.	Tulle Football Corrèze (6)	3–2 (a.e.t.)	ES Guérétoise (6)
19.	AAAM Laleu-La Pallice (8)	1–5 (a.e.t.)	Angoulême CFC (5)
20.	OL St Liguaire Niort (6)	1–3	Stade Poitevin FC (5)
21.	AS Portugais Châtellerault (8)	0–9	Trélissac FC (4)
22.	ES Audenge (7)	1–3 (a.e.t.)	FC Tartas-St Yaguen (6)
23.	FC Artiguelouve-Arbus-Aubertin (10)	0–2	Genêts Anglet (5)
24.	La Brède FC (6)	2–1	Arin Luzien (6)

== Sixth round ==
These matches were played on 27 and 28 October 2018.

Sixth round results: Nouvelle Aquitaine
Tie no	Home team (tier)	Score	Away team (tier)
1.	FCE Mérignac Arlac (5)	1–4	Pau FC (3)
2.	FC Chauray (5)	3–2	CA Neuville (6)
3.	Aviron Bayonnais FC (5)	1–3 (a.e.t.)	La Brède FC (6)
4.	SO Châtellerault (6)	2–1 (a.e.t.)	US Lormont (6)
5.	FC Tartas-St Yaguen (6)	3–1 (a.e.t.)	US Alliance Talençaise (7)
6.	CS Feytiat (6)	0–1	Stade Poitevin FC (5)
7.	Rochefort FC (8)	0–3	Angoulême CFC (5)
8.	Limoges FC (5)	3–0	Tulle Football Corrèze (6)
9.	US Chauvigny (5)	2–0	FC Libourne (6)
10.	La Jarrie FC (10)	0–1	Genêts Anglet (5)
11.	FC Grand St Emilionnais (7)	0–2	Bergerac Périgord FC (4)
12.	Trélissac FC (4)	2–2 (3–4 p)	US Lège Cap Ferret (5)
