= 2019–20 Coupe de France preliminary rounds, Nouvelle-Aquitaine =

The 2019–20 Coupe de France preliminary rounds, Nouvelle-Aquitaine was the qualifying competition to decide which teams from the leagues of the Nouvelle-Aquitaine region of France took part in the main competition from the seventh round.

A total of twelve teams qualified from the Nouvelle-Aquitaine preliminary rounds. In 2018–19 Bergerac Périgord FC progressed furthest in the main competition, reaching the round of 32 before losing to Orléans after extra time.

== Schedule ==
The first two rounds of the qualifying competition took place on the weekends of 25 August and 1 September 2019. A total of 536 teams participated in the first round, being all the engaged teams from Régional 3 (tier 8) and below, plus 17 teams from Régional 2 (tier 7), selected according to performance in last years competition. 70 teams entered at the second round stage, being the remaining 39 teams from Régional 2 and 31 teams from Régional 1 (tier 6).

The third round draw was made on 5 September 2019. The 11 teams from Championnat National 3 (tier 5) entered at this stage.

The fourth round draw was made on 20 September 2019. The four teams from Championnat National 2 (tier 4) entered at this stage. 47 ties were drawn.

The fifth round draw was made on 3 October 2019. The single team from Championnat National (tier 3) entered at this stage. 24 ties were drawn.

The sixth round draw was made on 17 October 2019. Twelve ties were drawn.

=== First round ===
These matches were played on 23, 24 and 25 August 2019, with one match rescheduled to 1 September 2019.

First round results: Nouvelle Aquitaine
Tie no	Home team (tier)	Score	Away team (tier)
1.	FC Espagnol Pau (11)	1–0	St Perdon Sports (10)
2.	St Médard SC (10)	0–3	FC Côteaux Pécharmant (9)
3.	FC Luy du Béarn (9)	2–1	Peyrehorade SF (10)
4.	US Roquefort (9)	2–4	US Castétis-Gouze (10)
5.	FREP St Vincent-de-Paul (9)	2–0	ES Pyrénéene (10)
6.	Les Labourdins d'Ustaritz (8)	2–1	FC Belin-Béliet (8)
7.	FC Parentis (10)	2–3	Hasparren FC (8)
8.	Labenne OSC (8)	2–3 (a.e.t.)	JA Biarritz (7)
9.	FC Born (9)	2–1	FC Garazi (10)
10.	JAB Pau (9)	0–7	Violette Aturine (8)
11.	Association Saint Laurent Billère (10)	1–2	FC Lacajunte-Tursan (9)
12.	ES Montoise (8)	0–2	FC Lescar (7)
13.	FC Barpais (10)	3–1	FC Oloronais (9)
14.	AJ Montmoreau (10)	2–4	JS Sireuil (7)
15.	Entente St Séverin/Palluaud (10)	1–2	AS St Yrieix (8)
16.	ES Montignacoise (11)	3–3 (4–5 p)	GSF Portugais Angoulême (9)
17.	USA St Aigulin (10)	2–5	CO La Couronne (8)
18.	FC Rouillac (11)	3–2	CS St Michel-sur-Charente (9)
19.	FC St Fraigne (11)	3–9	Clérac-Orignolles-St Martin-du-Lary (10)
20.	AS Montguyon (10)	2–1	US Anais (11)
21.	CS Bussac-Forêt (9)	2–5	ASFC Vindelle (9)
22.	AS St Georges-des-Côteaux (10)	0–0 (5–6 p)	AL St Brice (10)
23.	FC Portes d'Océan 17 (10)	0–3	Jarnac SF (7)
24.	US La Gémoze (10)	1–2	Alliance Foot 3B (8)
25.	FC Médoc Côte d'Argent (8)	1–3	ES Saintes (7)
26.	US Marennaise (8)	4–1	FC Martignas-Illac (8)
27.	Landes Girondines FC (10)	4–4 (4–5 p)	St Palais SF (8)
28.	US Pons (10)	1–2	JS Teichoise (10)
29.	CS St-Georges-d'Oléron (11)	0–5	Stade Pauillacais FC (9)
30.	US Châteauneuf 16 (10)	0–4	CA Ste Hélène (7)
31.	SL Châteaubernard (11)	1–5 (a.e.t.)	Cocarde OS St Laurent-Médoc (8)
32.	CO Cerizay (8)	7–0	US Vicq-sur-Gartempe (9)
33.	SL Cenon-sur-Vienne (10)	3–0 (Note: Tie won by means of forfeit.)	AS St Pierre-des-Échaubrognes (9)
34.	US La Chapelle-Viviers (13)	0–5	Boivre SC (10)
35.	ES Nouaillé (8)	1–1 (2–4 p)	AS Aiffres (8)
36.	CDJ Pompaire (12)	1–3	FC Fleuré (9)
37.	Gati-Foot (10)	3–4	US Mélusine (9)
38.	RC Parthenay Viennay (8)	5–1	SC Verrières (9)
39.	FC Smarves Iteuil (10)	3–0	US Vasléenne (9)
40.	FC Rouillé (10)	5–0	ASPTT Bessines (11)
41.	FC Confolentais (9)	1–0	JS Nieuil l'Espoir (9)
42.	ACG Foot Sud 86 (10)	4–4 (3–2 p)	AS Aigre (10)
43.	US Solignac-Le Vigen (10)	2–2 (3–4 p)	ES Soursac (10)
44.	ES Ussel (9)	2–4	AS Eymoutiers (9)
45.	EF Aubussonnais (8)	4–2	Foot Sud 87 (9)
46.	FC Pays Arédien (11)	0–1	US Felletin (8)
47.	Aunis AFC (9)	3–2	US Aulnay (10)
48.	US Pays Maixentais (9)	3–2 (a.e.t.)	FC Nord 17 (8)
49.	St Porchaire-Corme Royal FC (11)	4–3	ES Brûlain (11)
50.	AS Périgné (12)	5–1	FC Atlantique (10)
51.	ES Aunisienne Aytré (10)	3–5	CS Beauvoir-sur-Niort (10)
52.	US Cenon Rive Droite (9)	3–1	Andernos Sport FC (8)
53.	AS Facture-Biganos Boïens (9)	8–1	Bouliacaise FC (10)
54.	JS Lafarge Limoges (8)	4–1	US St Fiel (9)
55.	FC Sud Charente (10)	0–4	OFC Ruelle (8)
56.	ES Mornac (10)	6–1	FC Haute Charente (11)
57.	AS Brie (9)	4–0	CA Ribéracois (9)
58.	Fontafie FC (11)	0–9	AS Nontron-St Pardoux (8)
59.	ES Montignacoise (9)	1–8	US Donzenac (7)
60.	FC Cornilois-Fortunadais (9)	5–3	FC Canton d'Oradour-sur-Vayres (10)
61.	US St Léonard-de-Noblat (8)	3–0	FREP St Germain (9)
62.	ES Nonards (8)	5–0	ES Ussac (9)
63.	AS Beynat (8)	2–1	La Thibérienne (9)
64.	SA Le Palais-sur-Vienne (7)	2–2 (4–2 p)	FC Argentat (8)
65.	Gué-de-Sénac FC (10)	2–2 (3–4 p)	AS Côteaux Dordogne (10)
66.	CO Coulouniex-Chamiers (10)	0–2	FC Mascaret (7)
67.	US St Vincent-de-Connezac (11)	– (Note: Match abandoned at half-time after floodlight failure, with the score at 1–1. US St Vincent-de-Connezac', as the home side, penalised for not proving that they took all reasonable steps to resolve the floodlight issue within 45 minutes. Pays de l'Eyraud qualify.)	Pays de l'Eyraud (10)
68.	AS Marcellus-Cocumont (9)	0–2	US Gontaud (9)
69.	AS Antonne-Le Change (8)	2–1	FC Pays Aurossais (8)
70.	Monflanquin FC (9)	0–4	SU Agen (8)
71.	Chalosse FC (10)	1–2	AS Mourenx-Bourg (10)
72.	FC Gan (10)	3–0	Espérance Oeyreluy (10)
73.	Entente Haut Béarn (11)	1–8	FC Doazit (8)
74.	JS Laluque-Rion (9)	1–2 (a.e.t.)	Pardies Olympique (8)
75.	ES Bournos-Doumy-Garlède (10)	1–1 (4–3 p)	SC St Symphorien (10)
76.	FC Artiguelouve-Arbus-Aubertin (10)	2–2 (3–4 p)	JA Dax (8)
77.	Carresse Salies FC (10)	0–2	AS Lous Marous/FC St Geours (10)
78.	SA Mauléonais (8)	4–0	Patronage Bazadais (8)
79.	AS Villandraut-Préchac (11)	3–0	Monein FC (11)
80.	Avenir Mourenxois (10)	2–2 (3–2 p)	AS Pontonx (8)
81.	JS Labouheyre (11)	1–7	US St Palais (9)
82.	Ciboure FC (12)	1–3	Seignosse-Capbreton-Soustons FC (8)
83.	Ardanavy FC (11)	0–2	Biscarrosse OFC (8)
84.	AS Tarnos (8)	3–4 (a.e.t.)	Croisés St André Bayonne (7)
85.	Kanboko Izarra (11)	0–2	CA Morcenx (8)
86.	FC St Martin-de-Seignanx (9)	2–3	AS des Églantines de Hendaye (10)
87.	USV Gelosienne (9)	0–2	ES Meillon-Assat-Narcastet (8)
88.	FC Vallée de l'Ousse (9)	3–1	SC Taron Sévignacq (10)
89.	US Portugais Pau (8)	3–1	FC La Ribère (8)
90.	FC Lons (9)	3–1 (a.e.t.)	FC des Enclaves et du Plateau (10)
91.	SC St Pierre-du-Mont (7)	4–1	FA Bourbaki Pau (8)
92.	US Marsan (9)	2–3	Bleuets Pau (8)
93.	AS Mazères-Uzos-Rontignan (8)	10–1	AS Bretagne-de-Marsan (9)
94.	FC Hagetmautien (8)	6–6 (8–7 p)	Union Jurançonnaise (8)
95.	ES Nay-Vath-Vielha (9)	4–1	SA St Séverin (8)
96.	ES Fléac (11)	0–2	SC Mouthiers (9)
97.	FC Roullet-St Estèphe (9)	8–1	UAS Verdille (10)
98.	AS Mons (11)	4–1	Nersac FC (10)
99.	US Ma Campagne Angoulême (11)	2–4	Montpon-Ménesplet FC (8)
100.	St Aulaye Sports (12)	0–4	ES Linars (8)
101.	AS Salles-d'Angles (11)	2–7	ALFC Fontcouverte (10)
102.	Espoir Haut Vals de Saintonge (11)	0–3	AS Merpins (8)
103.	CS Chassors (13)	1–9	FC Sévigné Jonzac-St Germain (8)
104.	US Le Temple-Le Porge (11)	0–4	AS Cabariot (8)
105.	CA Sallois (10)	12–0	FC Essouvert Loulay (10
106.	AG Vendays-Montalivet (12)	1–0	Oléron FC (8)
107.	ES St Just-Luzac (10)	1–4	FC Médoc Océan (8)
108.	FC Montendre (10)	0–3	AS Avensan-Moulis-Listrac (11)
109.	ES Bocage (11)	1–4	ES Aubinrorthais (8)
110.	ES Beaulieu-Breuil (10)	0–2	ES St Cerbouillé (8)
111.	ES Lutaizien-Oiron (12)	1–10	US St Varent Pierregeay (8)
112.	Espérance Terves (8)	4–0	US Combranssière (9)
113.	ES Chanteloup-Chapelle (10)	1–3	ACS Mahorais 79 (10)
114.	US Mirebeau (11)	2–1 (a.e.t.)	ES Fayenoirterre (11)
115.	Entente Voulmentin-St Aubin-du-Plain-La Coudre (11)	1–3	Chasseneuil-St Georges FC (9)
116.	CL Noirlieu-Chambroutet Bressuire (12)	1–4 (a.e.t.)	ES Oyré-Dangé (8)
117.	US Brion 79 (11)	3–1	FC Loudun (10)
118.	US Vergentonnaise (11)	0–5	AS Portugais Châtellerault (8)
119.	AS Coulonges-Thouarsais (11)	5–0	AS St Christophe (12)
120.	ES Beaumont-St Cyr (8)	8–1	US Courlay (9)
121.	FC Pays de l'Ouin (9)	0–6	Antran SL (8)
122.	US Jaunay-Clan (11)	2–3	FC Vrines (9)
123.	FC ASM (12)	1–0	US Vrère-St Léger-de-Montbrun (10)
124.	Union Cernay-St Genest (10)	2–3	FC Airvo St Jouin (10)
125.	'US Thuré-Besse (10)	5–0	SA Mauzé-Rigné (11)
126.	FC St Jean-Missé (11)	2–3	AS St Léger Montbrillais (12)
127.	ES Pinbrécières (10)	0–0 (5–4 p)	US Nord Vienne (10)
128.	CS Dissay (12)	1–6	ES Louzy (10)
129.	FC Pays Argentonnais (9)	5–1	US Marigny St Léger (10)
130.	ES St Amand-sur-Sèvre (11)	3–3 (2–4 p)	US Envigne (9)
131.	FC Comores Bressuire (11)	0–0 (5–4 p)	Espérance Availles-en-Châtellerault (10)
132.	US Vouillé (11)	2–4	FC Fontaine-le-Comte (8)
133.	US La Ferrière Airoux (13)	2–6 (a.e.t.)	US Béruges (11)
134.	US Champdeniers-Pamplie (11)	4–1	AS St Eloi (11)
135.	CEP Poitiers (11)	3–1	US La Crèche (10)
136.	CA St Aubin-le-Cloud (10)	1–4	ES Trois Cités Poitiers (9)
137.	ASA Couronneries (12)	2–2 (0–3 p)	ES Pays Thénezéen (10)
138.	FC Jardres (12)	0–4	ES Ardin (9)
139.	Buslaurs Thireuil (10)	4–2	AAS St Julien-l'Ars (10)
140.	AS Poitiers Gibauderie (11)	4–0	AS Augé/Azay-le-Brûlé (11)
141.	Amicale St Martin (13)	0–6	ES St Benoit (8)
142.	FC Sud Gâtine (11)	4–2 (a.e.t.)	AS Valdivienne (11)
143.	FC Montamisé (10)	2–4	SA Moncoutant (7)
144.	FC Châtillon (12)	2–4	ES Brion-St Secondin (10)
145.	AS Sèvres-Anxaumont (10)	3–4 (a.e.t.)	CS Venise Verte (11)
146.	SC L'Absie-Largeasse/Moutiers-sous-Chantmerle (11)	0–2	ES La Pallu (11)
147.	US Leignes-sur-Fontaine (10)	1–8	Avenir 79 FC (10)
148.	ES Château-Larcher (9)	1–1 (5–6 p)	EF Le Tallud (7)
149.	ES Mougon (11)	2–1	AS Civaux (11)
150.	FC Valence-en-Pitou/Couhé (13)	0–4	AR Cherveux (12)
151.	Sud Vienne Région de Couhé (11)	3–4	SA Souvigné St Martin (11)
152.	SEPC Exireuil (11)	2–3 (a.e.t.)	US Vivonne (11)
153.	US Availles-Limouzine (14)	1–8	CS St Angeau (10)
154.	US Roches-La Villedieu (12)	0–3	US Le Dorat (11)
155.	US Abzac (11)	2–5 (a.e.t.)	OC Sommières St Romain (12)
156.	AS Blanzay (13)	1–5	Avenir Bellac-Berneuil-St Junien-les-Combes (8)
157.	US Lessac (10)	1–2	US Payroux (11)
158.	ESE Charentais (10)	1–2 (a.e.t.)	FC Usson-Isle (10)
159.	EFC Villefagnan (12)	5–1	CAS Bouresse (13)
160.	AS St Saviol (12)	0–6	Stade Ruffec (7)
161.	AS Exoudun (12)	2–3	Croutelle FC (13)
162.	CA Chamboulive (10)	0–1	Occitane FC (9)
163.	FC St Jal (10)	0–4	AS Châteauneuf-Neuvic (8)
164.	AS Panazol (8)	6–0	CA Meymac (8)
165.	Entente Troche-Vigeois (10)	0–1 (a.e.t.)	Espoirs La Geneytouse (10)
166.	ASC La Meyze (13)	0–9	Entente Perpezac Sadroc (9)
167.	US Vallière (10)	2–3 (a.e.t.)	US St Clementoise (9)
168.	USS Mérinchal (9)	1–2	AS Chamberet (8)
169.	AS Pays Mellois (9)	5–1	La Jarrie FC (10)
170.	FC Canton de Courçon (11)	0–3	US Lezay (10)
171.	FC La Soie (11)	2–6	ES Celles-Verrines (8)
172.	US Chenay-Chey-Sepvret (11)	0–5	Capaunis ASPTT FC (8)
173.	EFC DB2S (9)	0–2	Stade Vouillé (8)
174.	AS St Martin-lès-Melle (11)	1–5	AS Argenteuil Angerien Poursay-Garnaud (10)
175.	ES St Hippolyte (11)	0–6	US Frontenay-St Symphorien (9)
176.	US Mauzé-sur-le-Mignon (10)	0–4	AAAM Laleu-La Pallice (9)
177.	ES Clussais (12)	1–4	Avenir Matha (8)
178.	AS Andilly (10)	4–5 (a.e.t.)	AS Portugais Niort (7)
179.	SA Souché (11)	0–5	Canton Aunis FC (10)
180.	FC Haute Val de Sèvre (11)	7–2	Breuil-Magné FC (11)
181.	Avenir St Vincent-Chail-Maisonnais (12)	1–8	AS Maritime (8)
182.	Val de Boutonne Foot 79 (10)	2–1	Aviron Boutonnais (9)
183.	AS Vérines (12)	1–4	FC Boutonnais (10)
184.	SJ Yvrac (11)	1–1 (4–3 p)	CS Portugais Villenave-d'Ornon (9)
185.	AS Le Haillan (10)	2–3	FC Arsac-Pian Médoc (8)
186.	AS Lusitanos Cenon (9)	3–0	SJ Macaudaise (9)
187.	CS Lantonnais (9)	4–0	RC Bordeaux Métropole (8)
188.	JS Bersonnaise (11)	0–3	Union St Bruno (8)
189.	ES Ambares (8)	8–1	FC Pierroton Cestas Toctoucau (10)
190.	AGJA Caudéran (10)	6–1	VS Caudrot (10)
191.	Cazaux Olympique (9)	1–0	FC Lesparre Médoc (10)
192.	USC Léognan (11)	0–2	Sporting Chantecler Bordeaux Nord le Lac (9)
193.	Avenir Nord Foot 87 (11)	0–2	RFC Ste Feyre (9)
194.	US Beaune-les-Mines (9)	5–2	US Versillacoise (10)
195.	AS St Sébastien-Azerables (10)	1–4	SC Verneuil-sur-Vienne (8)
196.	AS Reterre Fontanières (11)	0–5	US Bessines-Morterolles (8)
197.	ES Bénévent-Marsac (9)	2–1	US Nantiat (10)
198.	Creuse Avenir 2005 (10)	0–2	USE Couzeix-Chaptelat (8)
199.	USC Bourganeuf (9)	0–1	AS Ambazac (10)
200.	AS St Jouvent (11)	3–5	JS Chambon-sur-Voueize (9)
201.	US Veyrac (10)	0–2	ES Marchoise (7)
202.	US St Vaury (9)	0–1	ES Beaubreuil (8)
203.	Vigenal FC Limoges (9)	3–0	ES Evaux-Budelière (10)
204.	US Grand Bourg (11)	0–0 (1–3 p)	FC St Pardoux-le-Lac (12)
205.	AS La Jonchère-St Maurice (11)	1–4	AS St Sulpice-le-Guérétois (9)
206.	AS Villebois/Haute Boëme (9)	0–9	FC Charente Limousine (8)
207.	US Taponnat (12)	0–2	FC des 2 Vallées (10)
208.	US Tocane-St Apre (10)	2–6	JS Basseau Angoulême (9)
209.	CA St Victurnien (10)	1–3	ES Champniers (8)
210.	FC St Brice-sur-Vienne (9)	5–1	US Chasseneuil (10)
211.	AS Puymoyen (8)	3–0	AS St Junien (8)
212.	FC Pays Mareuil (8)	7–1	Coqs Rouges Mansle (9)
213.	Rochechouart OC (11)	2–0	Tardoire FC La Roche/Rivières (8)
214.	US Oradour-sur-Glane (11)	1–6	USA Montbronn (10)
215.	CA Brignac (11)	2–6	Condat FC (11)
216.	Limoges Landouge (8)	2–0	AS Jugeals-Noailles (8)
217.	FC Excideuil-St Médard (11)	1–6	Varetz AC (9)
218.	Cosnac FC (10)	0–3	FC Cendrieux-La Douze (8)
219.	APCS Mahorais Brive (11)	0–3	US La Roche l'Abeille (10)
220.	AS Limoges Roussillon (8)	4–1	Espérance St Robertoise (9)
221.	Olympique Larche Lafeuillade (9)	1–3	AS Nexon (10)
222.	AC Kurdes Limoges (11)	1–2	SS Ste Féréole (9)
223.	FC Objat (10)	1–3 (a.e.t.)	Auvézère Mayne FC (9)
224.	US Bachellière (11)	1–7	Entente des Barrages de la Xaintrie (10)
225.	ES Alvéroise (10)	0–6	ASV Malemort (9)
226.	Stade Blayais (11)	4–2	SA Sanilhacois (10)
227.	JS Castellevequois (10)	0–5	FC Côteaux Libournais (8)
228.	JS St Christophe-de-Double (11)	0–5	FC Loubesien (9)
229.	CA Carbon-Blanc (10)	3–0	AS Les Bisons (11)
230.	FCC Créonnais (11)	0–3	AS Taillan (8)
231.	US St Denis-de-Pile (10)	1–2	FC Côteaux Bordelais (8)
232.	SC Laruscade (11)	0–2	Limens JSA (8)
233.	St Sulpice Jeunesse (11)	2–3	AS Pugnac (11)
234.	US Coutras (11)	1–6	FC Côteaux Bourgeais (8)
235.	FC Pineuilh (11)	5–8	Périgueux Foot (11)
236.	JS Abzac (12)	0–3	FC Sarlat-Marcillac (8)
237.	FC St Laurent d'Arce/St Gervais (9)	0–3	Les Aiglons Razacois (10)
238.	FC Cubnezais (11)	1–2 (a.e.t.)	RC Laurence (10)
239.	ES Bruges (10)	0–1	FC St André-de-Cubzac (8)
240.	FC Coly (12)	0–8	US Nord Gironde (11)
241.	AS Coursac (12)	1–2 (a.e.t.)	AS Gensac-Montcaret (8)
242.	AS Soyaux (8)	2–4	FC Estuaire Haute Gironde (7)
243.	FC Vernois (10)	1–0	FC Monbazillac-Sigoules (11)
244.	US Annesse-et-Beaulieu (10)	3–1	FC Faux (9)
245.	US Chancelade/Marsac (10)	3–0	AS Pays de Montaigne et Gurçon (9)
246.	RC Chambéry (10)	3–2	Stade Pessacais UC (11)
247.	AS Montferrand (11)	3–2	Bordeaux Étudiants CF (10)
248.	SC Cadaujac (8)	7–1	FC Gradignan (10)
249.	ES Eysinaise (9)	1–5	FC Pessac Alouette (8)
250.	Montesquieu FC (8)	4–0	CM Floirac (10)
251.	SC Bastidienne (10)	5–1	USJ St Augustin Club Pyrénées Aquitaine (10)
252.	CMO Bassens (9)	2–3	US Virazeil-Puymiclan (9)
253.	ASSA Pays du Dropt (9)	1–3	Entente Boé Bon-Encontre (8)
254.	Confluent Football 47 (8)	3–4	AS Miramont-Lavergne (10)
255.	FC Casteljaloux (10)	0–4 (Note: Tie reversed with agreement of both clubs.)	US Bazeillaise (10)
256.	Tonneins FC (10)	0–3	FC Gironde La Réole (10)
257.	Sud Gironde FC (11)	2–4	US La Catte (8)
258.	AS Sauveterrienne (11)	0–4	SC Astaffortais (10)
259.	CA Castets-en-Dorthe (10)	2–5	AS Rouffignac-Plazac (8)
260.	SC Monségur (11)	2–4	FC Pays Beaumontois (9)
261.	US Illats (10)	3–1	FC Nérac (8)
262.	FCFR La Force (10)	4–2	Mas AC (9)
263.	SJ Bergerac (12)	1–3	ES Mazères-Roaillan (11)
264.	FC Pont-du-Casse-Foulayronnes (9)	1–2	Targon-Soulignac FC (9)
265.	Les Epis de Montanceix-Montrem (11)	0–7	ES Fronsadaise (10)
266.	Bleuets Macariens (11)	1–0	Colayrac FC (8)
267.	US Lamothe-Mongauzy (10)	1–1 (2–4 p)	AF Casseneuil-Pailloles-Lédat (8)
268.	AS Castillonnès Cahuzac Lalande (9)	2–1	Fraternelle Landiras (10)

=== Second round ===
These matches were played between 30 August 2019 and 8 September 2019

Second round results: Nouvelle Aquitaine
Tie no	Home team (tier)	Score	Away team (tier)
1.	ES Meillon-Assat-Narcastet (8)	0–1	Montesquieu FC (8)
2.	AS Cozes (7)	1–7	FC Libourne (6)
3.	La Ligugéenne Football (7)	1–2	AS Échiré St Gelais (6)
4.	AS Montguyon (10)	3–4	AS Gensac-Montcaret (8)
5.	FC Smarves Iteuil (10)	4–1	AS Coulonges-Thouarsais (11)
6.	RC Parthenay Viennay (8)	4–1	CS Naintré (7)
7.	CA Neuville (6)	4–0	US St Sauveur (7)
8.	Thouars Foot 79 (6)	4–1	US Migné-Auxances (7)
9.	FC Airvo St Jouin (10)	2–2 (0–3 p)	AS Poitiers Gibauderie (11)
10.	St Porchaire-Corme Royal FC (11)	0–5	Capaunis ASPTT FC (8)
11.	FC Boutonnais (10)	0–3	Rochefort FC (7)
12.	FC Périgny (7)	4–1	AS Portugais Niort (7)
13.	AS Périgné (12)	2–1	FC Fontaine-le-Comte (8)
14.	ES Celles-Verrines (8)	5–1	AS Cabariot (8)
15.	FC Rouillé (10)	1–6	FC Chauray (6)
16.	CA St Savin-St Germain (7)	5–0	Avenir Bellac-Berneuil-St Junien-les-Combes (8)
17.	AS Brie (9)	0–3	ES Marchoise (7)
18.	FC Confolentais (9)	4–1	ES Bénévent-Marsac (9)
19.	US Payroux (11)	2–2 (6–7 p)	AS Ambazac (10)
20.	ES Mornac (10)	2–1	Rochechouart OC (11)
21.	US Le Dorat (11)	0–6	OFC Ruelle (8)
22.	Auvézère Mayne FC (9)	2–4	SA Le Palais-sur-Vienne (7)
23.	USE Couzeix-Chaptelat (8)	5–3 (a.e.t.)	US St Clementoise (9)
24.	AS Gouzon (7)	2–1	CA Rilhac-Rancon (7)
25.	Entente Perpezac Sadroc (9)	1–4	AS Eymoutiers (9)
26.	JS Sireuil (7)	5–3	ES Saintes (7)
27.	FC Grand St Emilionnais (7)	2–0	AS Puymoyen (8)
28.	St Palais SF (8)	3–3 (5–3 p)	US Marennaise (8)
29.	JS Basseau Angoulême (9)	3–5	Clérac-Orignolles-St Martin-du-Lary (10)
30.	FC Arsac-Pian Médoc (8)	0–2	AS Taillan (8)
31.	FC Médoc Océan (8)	0–4	Jeunesse Villenave (6)
32.	Stade Pauillacais FC (9)	0–2	FC St Médard-en-Jalles (6)
33.	FC Côteaux Bourgeais (8)	4–3	FC Côteaux Bordelais (8)
34.	Limoges FC (6)	0–1	AS St Pantaleon (7)
35.	AS Beynat (8)	2–4 (a.e.t.)	AS Aixoise (7)
36.	USA Montbronn (10)	0–2	FC Thenon-Limeyrat-Fossemagne (7)
37.	AS Rouffignac-Plazac (8)	1–2	US Donzenac (7)
38.	ES Nonards (8)	0–6	JA Isle (6)
39.	Stade Ygossais (7)	0–5	JA Biarritz (7)
40.	FC Barpais (10)	1–0	FC Tartas-St Yaguen (6)
41.	Croisés St André Bayonne (7)	3–0	ES Audenge (7)
42.	Biscarrosse OFC (8)	3–2	AS Facture-Biganos Boïens (9)
43.	FC Gironde La Réole (10)	3–1	Périgueux Foot (11)
44.	Entente Boé Bon-Encontre (8)	1–2	FC Marmande 47 (6)
45.	FA Morlaàs Est Béarn (7)	1–0	AS Mazères-Uzos-Rontignan
46.	FC Lescar (7)	2–0	Violette Aturine (8)
47.	Élan Béarnaise Orthez (6)	2–2 (6–5 p)	SC St Pierre-du-Mont (7)
48.	Pardies Olympique (8)	0–2	FC des Graves (7)
49.	SU Agen (8)	3–0	Limens JSA (8)
50.	ES Trois Cités Poitiers (9)	1–1 (3–2 p)	Espérance Terves (8)
51.	US Béruges (11)	0–2	ES Pinbrécières (10)
52.	Boivre SC (10)	1–3	ES Aubinrorthais (8)
53.	FC Vrines (9)	2–1	Chasseneuil-St Georges FC (9)
54.	ES Beaumont-St Cyr (8)	4–0	FC Pays Argentonnais (9)
55.	ES St Cerbouillé (8)	5–4 (a.e.t.)	AS Mignaloux-Beauvoir (7)
56.	US Mirebeau (11)	0–8	FC Nueillaubiers (6)
57.	ES Pays Thénezéen (10)	3–1	ES La Pallu (11)
58.	ES Louzy (10)	4–0 (Note: Tie reversed with agreement of both clubs.)	AS St Léger Montbrillais (12)
59.	US Brion 79 (11)	0–6	ES Oyré-Dangé (8)
60.	AS Portugais Châtellerault (8)	1–0	EF Le Tallud (7)
61.	ACS Mahorais 79 (10)	3–0 (Note: Tie won by means of forfeit.)	SL Cenon-sur-Vienne (10)
62.	US St Varent Pierregeay (8)	1–6	Antran SL (8)
63.	US Thuré-Besse (10)	2–3	CO Cerizay (8)
64.	SA Moncoutant (7)	2–3 (a.e.t.)	ES Buxerolles (6)
65.	US Envigne (9)	1–5	Buslaurs Thireuil (10)
66.	FC Comores Bressuire (11)	4–0	FC ASM (12)
67.	CS Beauvoir-sur-Niort (10)	2–2 (5–4 p)	AS Réthaise (7)
68.	CEP Poitiers (11)	2–7	La Rochelle Villeneuve FC (7)
69.	FC Sud Gâtine (11)	1–5	ES La Rochelle (6)
70.	OC Sommières St Romain (12)	0–2	US Pays Maixentais (9)
71.	CS Venise Verte (11)	2–5	Aunis AFC (9)
72.	AAAM Laleu-La Pallice (9)	2–1	Stade Vouillé (8)
73.	Avenir 79 FC (10)	2–1 (a.e.t.)	Stade Ruffec (7)
74.	AS Argenteuil Angerien Poursay-Garnaud (10)	0–6	AS Pays Mellois (9)
75.	AS Mons (11)	2–8	UA Niort St Florent (6)
76.	FC Haute Val de Sèvre (11)	1–0	AS Maritime (8)
77.	ES Mougon (11)	1–4	SC St Jean-d'Angély (6)
78.	Val de Boutonne Foot 79 (10)	2–3	ES St Benoit (8)
79.	SA Souvigné St Martin (11)	0–1	US Vivonne (11)
80.	Croutelle FC (13)	1–6	US Lezay (10)
81.	AR Cherveux (12)	0–3	ACG Foot Sud 86 (10)
82.	US Champdeniers-Pamplie (11)	1–4	US Mélusine (9)
83.	EFC Villefagnan (12)	0–4	ES Ardin (9)
84.	Canton Aunis FC (10)	0–2	US Frontenay-St Symphorien (9)
85.	AS Aiffres (8)	0–2	OL St Liguaire Niort (6)
86.	US Beaune-les-Mines (9)	3–4	UES Montmorillon (6)
87.	FC St Pardoux-le-Lac (12)	1–13	FC Charente Limousine (8)
88.	CS St Angeau (10)	0–2	US Bessines-Morterolles (8)
89.	SC Verneuil-sur-Vienne (8)	1–2	FC Fleuré (9)
90.	ES Brion-St Secondin (10)	6–0	FC des 2 Vallées (10)
91.	FC Usson-Isle (10)	5–2	FC St Brice-sur-Vienne (9)
92.	RFC Ste Feyre (9)	2–3	Vigenal FC Limoges (9)
93.	Occitane FC (9)	0–2	AS St Sulpice-le-Guérétois (9)
94.	US Felletin (8)	2–3	Amicale Franco-Portugais Limoges (7)
95.	Espoirs La Geneytouse (10)	0–4	CS Boussac (7)
96.	ES Guérétoise (7)	6–0	AS Châteauneuf-Neuvic (8)
97.	ES Beaubreuil (8)	2–3 (a.e.t.)	EF Aubussonnais (8)
98.	JS Chambon-sur-Voueize (9)	0–3	CS Feytiat (6)
99.	AS Panazol (8)	1–1 (4–5 p)	Tulle Football Corrèze (7)
100.	AS Chamberet (8)	2–2 (2–3 p)	US St Léonard-de-Noblat (8)
101.	ES Fronsadaise (10)	1–2	AS Merpins (8)
102.	SJ Yvrac (11)	0–2	SC Mouthiers (9)
103.	GSF Portugais Angoulême (9)	5–3	FC Sévigné Jonzac-St Germain (8)
104.	RC Laurence (10)	2–3	ALFC Fontcouverte (10)
105.	Alliance Foot 3B (8)	0–0 (4–2 p)	FC Estuaire Haute Gironde (7)
106.	AS Montferrand (11)	0–1	Avenir Matha (8)
107.	CS Leroy Angoulême (7)	1–0	FC St André-de-Cubzac (8)
108.	Jarnac SF (7)	2–1	FC Pays Mareuil (8)
109.	FC Rouillac (11)	0–3	FC Loubesien (9)
110.	AL St Brice (10)	5–5 (4–3 p)	FC Côteaux Libournais (8)
111.	Stade Blayais (11)	2–5	ASFC Vindelle (9)
112.	Targon-Soulignac FC (9)	1–5	AS St Yrieix (8)
113.	US Nord Gironde (11)	0–4	ES Champniers (8)
114.	CO La Couronne (8)	0–2	Royan Vaux AFC (6)
115.	FC Mascaret (7)	6–1	ES Linars (8)
116.	FC Pessac Alouette (8)	5–2	CA Béglais (7)
117.	US Alliance Talençaise (7)	4–0	Union St Bruno (8)
118.	Cocarde OS St Laurent-Médoc (8)	0–1	SA Mérignac (7)
119.	ES Ambares (8)	5–5 (4–5 p)	US Bouscataise (7)
120.	Sporting Chantecler Bordeaux Nord le Lac (9)	3–2	AS Côteaux Dordogne (10)
121.	CA Carbon-Blanc (10)	1–2	ES Blanquefort (6)
122.	AS Lusitanos Cenon (9)	2–1	SC Bastidienne (10)
123.	AS Avensan-Moulis-Listrac (11)	1–9	US Lormont (6)
124.	US Cenon Rive Droite (9)	2–1	Coqs Rouges Bordeaux (7)
125.	Varetz AC (9)	1–5	FC Sarlat-Marcillac (8)
126.	AS Nexon (10)	3–1	ASV Malemort (9)
127.	AS Limoges Roussillon (8)	1–1 (4–2 p)	ESA Brive (6)
128.	AS Nontron-St Pardoux (8)	2–1	SS Ste Féréole (9)
129.	ES Soursac (10)	0–7	Limoges Landouge (8)
130.	Entente des Barrages de la Xaintrie (10)	0–1	JS Lafarge Limoges (8)
131.	US La Roche l'Abeille (10)	1–4	FC Cornilois-Fortunadais (9)
132.	US St Palais (9)	4–3	FREP St Vincent-de-Paul (9)
133.	CS Lantonnais (9)	2–1	St Paul Sport (6)
134.	JS Teichoise (10)	1–2	Hiriburuko Ainhara (6)
135.	Bleuets Macariens (11)	0–6	AS des Églantines de Hendaye (10)
136.	CA Morcenx (8)	2–1	Hasparren FC (8)
137.	Cazaux Olympique (9)	1–3 (a.e.t.)	FC Born (9)
138.	Seignosse-Capbreton-Soustons FC (8)	2–4 (a.e.t.)	Arin Luzien (6)
139.	SAG Cestas (6)	3–0	Elan Boucalais (7)
140.	AS Lous Marous/FC St Geours (10)	1–2	Les Labourdins d'Ustaritz (8)
141.	CA Sallois (10)	2–1	JA Dax (8)
142.	Pays de l'Eyraud (10)	0–1	US La Catte (8)
143.	AS Miramont-Lavergne (10)	2–5	FC Cendrieux-La Douze (8)
144.	FC Pays Beaumontois (9)	3–2 (a.e.t.)	CA Ste Hélène (7)
145.	US Chancelade/Marsac (10)	1–2	FC Vallée du Lot (7)
146.	Condat FC (11)	2–4 (a.e.t.)	US Gontaud (9)
147.	US Virazeil-Puymiclan (9)	1–0	US Annesse-et-Beaulieu (10)
148.	Stade St Médardais (7)	4–1 (a.e.t.)	Prigonrieux FC (7)
149.	FCFR La Force (10)	0–1	AF Casseneuil-Pailloles-Lédat (8)
150.	AS Castillonnès Cahuzac Lalande (9)	3–1	AS Antonne-Le Change (8)
151.	SC Astaffortais (10)	1–3	US Mussidan-St Medard (8)
152.	FC Vernois (10)	0–3	ES Boulazac (6)
153.	AG Vendays-Montalivet (12)	2–1	Les Aiglons Razacois (10)
154.	FC Côteaux Pécharmant (9)	5–0	AGJA Caudéran (10)
155.	US Bazeillaise (10)	2–7	Montpon-Ménesplet FC (8)
156.	ES Nay-Vath-Vielha (9)	0–3	AS Artix (7)
157.	US Illats (10)	2–1	US Portugais Pau (8)
158.	FC Doazit (8)	4–2	FC Lons (9)
159.	ES Mazères-Roaillan (11)	1–1 (4–3 p)	FC Gan (10)
160.	AL Poey-de-Lescar (7)	2–3 (a.e.t.)	FC Hagetmautien (8)
161.	RC Chambéry (10)	0–2	Bleuets Pau (8)
162.	ES Bournos-Doumy-Garlède (10)	1–5	FC des Portes de l'Entre-Deux-Mers (6)
163.	Avenir Mourenxois (10)	0–5	SC Cadaujac (8)
164.	AS Villandraut-Préchac (11)	2–3	FC Luy du Béarn (9)
165.	AS Mourenx-Bourg (10)	1–2 (a.e.t.)	FC Lacajunte-Tursan (9)
166.	SA Mauléonais (8)	2–1	La Brède FC (6)
167.	US Castétis-Gouze (10)	4–0	FC Espagnol Pau (11)
168.	AS Pugnac (11)	4–5	FC Roullet-St Estèphe (9)
169.	FC Vallée de l'Ousse (9)	1–4	Langon FC (7)

=== Third round ===
These matches were played on 14 and 15 September 2019

Third round results: Nouvelle Aquitaine
Tie no	Home team (tier)	Score	Away team (tier)
1.	US Lège Cap Ferret (5)	3–2	Jeunesse Villenave (6)
2.	JA Biarritz (7)	4–1	AS Artix (7)
3.	CO Cerizay (8)	1–6	FC Chauray (6)
4.	AS Aixoise (7)	2–0	JA Isle (6)
5.	AS Périgné (12)	2–4	Rochefort FC (7)
6.	Capaunis ASPTT FC (8)	3–1	ES Celles-Verrines (8)
7.	ALFC Fontcouverte (10)	5–2	AAAM Laleu-La Pallice (9)
8.	AS St Yrieix (8)	1–4	CS Leroy Angoulême (7)
9.	SC St Jean-d'Angély (6)	1–3	UA Niort St Florent (6)
10.	SA Le Palais-sur-Vienne (7)	2–1	US St Léonard-de-Noblat (8)
11.	JS Lafarge Limoges (8)	1–2	USE Couzeix-Chaptelat (8)
12.	Aunis AFC (9)	3–0	US Frontenay-St Symphorien (9)
13.	ES Champniers (8)	1–2	La Rochelle Villeneuve FC (7)
14.	CA Neuville (6)	1–1 (4–5 p)	Thouars Foot 79 (6)
15.	US Mélusine (9)	3–2	US Lezay (10)
16.	FC Smarves Iteuil (10)	1–3	ES Aubinrorthais (8)
17.	US Vivonne (11)	0–4	FC Comores Bressuire (11)
18.	ES St Benoit (8)	1–2	ES Beaumont-St Cyr (8)
19.	ES Oyré-Dangé (8)	0–3	FC Nueillaubiers (6)
20.	Antran SL (8)	0–5	FC Bressuire (5)
21.	US Pays Maixentais (9)	0–3	Stade Poitevin FC (5)
22.	FC Charente Limousine (8)	0–5	UES Montmorillon (6)
23.	ES Guérétoise (7)	2–1 (a.e.t.)	AS Gouzon (7)
24.	FC Cendrieux-La Douze (8)	0–2	FC Marmande 47 (6)
25.	AS Castillonnès Cahuzac Lalande (9)	2–3	FC Thenon-Limeyrat-Fossemagne (7)
26.	FC Lescar (7)	2–1	Croisés St André Bayonne (7)
27.	FC Luy du Béarn (9)	3–2 (a.e.t.)	FC des Graves (7)
28.	Biscarrosse OFC (8)	1–2	Élan Béarnaise Orthez (6)
29.	Bleuets Pau (8)	5–1 (Note: Tie reversed from original draw.)	AS des Églantines de Hendaye (10)
30.	Les Labourdins d'Ustaritz (8)	4–1	FC Born (9)
31.	FC Barpais (10)	1–5	FC Doazit (8)
32.	US Gontaud (9)	2–3	FC Vallée du Lot (7)
33.	Tulle Football Corrèze (7)	2–2 (5–3 p)	US Mussidan-St Medard (8)
34.	US Bessines-Morterolles (8)	3–2	Vigenal FC Limoges (9)
35.	SC Mouthiers (9)	1–2	JS Sireuil (7)
36.	St Palais SF (8)	3–2 (a.e.t.)	Royan Vaux AFC (6)
37.	FC Lacajunte-Tursan (9)	0–4	SA Mauléonais (8)
38.	FC Bassin d'Arcachon (5)	0–0 (3–4 p)	FC St Médard-en-Jalles (6)
39.	FC Gironde La Réole (10)	0–4	FC Grand St Emilionnais (7)
40.	FC Cornilois-Fortunadais (9)	1–3	AF Casseneuil-Pailloles-Lédat (8)
41.	FC Sarlat-Marcillac (8)	2–1	SU Agen (8)
42.	AS Pays Mellois (9)	4–2	GSF Portugais Angoulême (9)
43.	CS Beauvoir-sur-Niort (10)	2–4	OFC Ruelle (8)
44.	Amicale Franco-Portugais Limoges (7)	7–1	ES Marchoise (7)
45.	AS Nexon (10)	1–2	CS Boussac (7)
46.	AS Ambazac (10)	0–2 (a.e.t.)	FC Confolentais (9)
47.	AS Nontron-St Pardoux (8)	2–3	CS Feytiat (6)
48.	Limoges Landouge (8)	2–2 (5–3 p)	CA St Savin-St Germain (7)
49.	AS St Sulpice-le-Guérétois (9)	4–0	AS Limoges Roussillon (8)
50.	AS Eymoutiers (9)	0–1	EF Aubussonnais (8)
51.	FC Pessac Alouette (8)	4–1	FC Côteaux Bourgeais (8)
52.	Jarnac SF (7)	0–1	UA Cognac (5)
53.	ASFC Vindelle (9)	1–5	OL St Liguaire Niort (6)
54.	Avenir Matha (8)	0–4	ES La Rochelle (6)
55.	ES Mornac (10)	2–1 (a.e.t.)	FC Périgny (7)
56.	ES Pinbrécières (10)	1–3	ACG Foot Sud 86 (10)
57.	ES Trois Cités Poitiers (9)	0–2	AS Échiré St Gelais (6)
58.	AS Poitiers Gibauderie (11)	4–1	ES Ardin (9)
59.	ACS Mahorais 79 (10)	1–8	SO Châtellerault (5)
60.	FC Vrines (9)	2–4	RC Parthenay Viennay (8)
61.	Avenir 79 FC (10)	5–0	ES Louzy (10)
62.	FC Fleuré (9)	5–2 (a.e.t.)	Buslaurs Thireuil (10)
63.	FC Usson-Isle (10)	4–0	ES St Cerbouillé (8)
64.	ES Brion-St Secondin (10)	0–2	AS Portugais Châtellerault (8)
65.	ES Pays Thénezéen (10)	0–6	US Chauvigny (5)
66.	FC Haute Val de Sèvre (11)	0–4	ES Buxerolles (6)
67.	AG Vendays-Montalivet (12)	0–9	FC des Portes de l'Entre-Deux-Mers (6)
68.	Montpon-Ménesplet FC (8)	8–0	US Virazeil-Puymiclan (9)
69.	FC Pays Beaumontois (9)	0–8	FC Libourne (6)
70.	Langon FC (7)	3–1 (a.e.t.)	FA Morlaàs Est Béarn (7)
71.	US St Palais (9)	1–4	Arin Luzien (6)
72.	US Illats (10)	0–3	Hiriburuko Ainhara (6)
73.	ES Mazères-Roaillan (11)	0–5	Stade Montois (5)
74.	FC Hagetmautien (8)	0–3	Genêts Anglet (5)
75.	US Castétis-Gouze (10)	0–5	Aviron Bayonnais FC (5)
76.	CA Morcenx (8)	2–2 (3–2 p)	Stade St Médardais (7)
77.	AS St Pantaleon (7)	5–0	US La Catte (8)
78.	AS Gensac-Montcaret (8)	0–5	ES Boulazac (6)
79.	FC Côteaux Pécharmant (9)	0–4	US Donzenac (7)
80.	AL St Brice (10)	1–4	Alliance Foot 3B (8)
81.	FC Roullet-St Estèphe (9)	0–2	SC Cadaujac (8)
82.	AS Lusitanos Cenon (9)	2–4	US Lormont (6)
83.	FC Loubesien (9)	0–2	US Cenon Rive Droite (9)
84.	Clérac-Orignolles-St Martin-du-Lary (10)	1–5	SA Mérignac (7)
85.	AS Merpins (8)	2–1	US Alliance Talençaise (7)
86.	CS Lantonnais (9)	1–4	SAG Cestas (6)
87.	Sporting Chantecler Bordeaux Nord le Lac (9)	2–2 (2–3 p)	US Bouscataise (7)
88.	ES Blanquefort (6)	1–3	FC Mascaret (7)
89.	AS Taillan (8)	1–3	FCE Mérignac Arlac (5)
90.	CA Sallois (10)	2–0	Montesquieu FC (8)

=== Fourth round ===
These matches were played on 28 and 29 September 2019

Fourth round results: Nouvelle Aquitaine
Tie no	Home team (tier)	Score	Away team (tier)
1.	Bleuets Pau (8)	2–1	FC Luy du Béarn (9)
2.	ES Buxerolles (6)	0–2	Trélissac FC (4)
3.	JS Sireuil (7)	2–0	FC Vallée du Lot (7)
4.	Bergerac Périgord FC (4)	3–0	UA Cognac (5)
5.	ES Mornac (10)	1–4	SA Mérignac (7)
6.	FC Grand St Emilionnais (7)	0–1	FC St Médard-en-Jalles (6)
7.	ALFC Fontcouverte (10)	2–1	Alliance Foot 3B (8)
8.	FC Marmande 47 (6)	3–0	US Lormont (6)
9.	St Palais SF (8)	0–4	US Lège Cap Ferret (5)
10.	Élan Béarnaise Orthez (6)	1–5	FC des Portes de l'Entre-Deux-Mers (6)
11.	Les Labourdins d'Ustaritz (8)	1–2 (a.e.t.)	Hiriburuko Ainhara (6)
12.	Arin Luzien (6)	0–3	JA Biarritz (7)
13.	US Donzenac (7)	3–2	EF Aubussonnais (8)
14.	AS Aixoise (7)	0–2 (a.e.t.)	FCE Mérignac Arlac (5)
15.	ES La Rochelle (6)	1–2 (a.e.t.)	Thouars Foot 79 (6)
16.	FC Chauray (6)	7–1	Amicale Franco-Portugais Limoges (7)
17.	Aunis AFC (9)	0–11	Angoulême-Soyaux Charente (4)
18.	ACG Foot Sud 86 (10)	1–3 (a.e.t.)	AS Échiré St Gelais (6)
19.	Rochefort FC (7)	0–1	La Rochelle Villeneuve FC (7)
20.	RC Parthenay Viennay (8)	1–2	FC Bressuire (5)
21.	UES Montmorillon (6)	2–1 (a.e.t.)	ES Guérétoise (7)
22.	ES Boulazac (6)	5–1	Tulle Football Corrèze (7)
23.	OFC Ruelle (8)	0–3	SA Le Palais-sur-Vienne (7)
24.	USE Couzeix-Chaptelat (8)	2–3 (a.e.t.)	US Chauvigny (5)
25.	FC Confolentais (9)	0–2	AS St Pantaleon (7)
26.	FC Thenon-Limeyrat-Fossemagne (7)	2–1	Limoges Landouge (8)
27.	AS Merpins (8)	0–8	FC Libourne (6)
28.	AF Casseneuil-Pailloles-Lédat (8)	1–2	FC Mascaret (7)
29.	CS Leroy Angoulême (7)	0–2	US Bouscataise (7)
30.	US Cenon Rive Droite (9)	0–2	FC Pessac Alouette (8)
31.	SAG Cestas (6)	2–0	FC Lescar (7)
32.	FC Doazit (8)	0–4	Stade Montois (5)
33.	CA Morcenx (8)	0–2	Stade Bordelais (4)
34.	CA Sallois (10)	1–3	Aviron Bayonnais FC (5)
35.	SA Mauléonais (8)	2–6	Genêts Anglet (5)
36.	FC Fleuré (9)	1–2	CS Boussac (7)
37.	FC Usson-Isle (10)	0–1 (a.e.t.)	US Bessines-Morterolles (8)
38.	Avenir 79 FC (10)	0–2	SO Châtellerault (5)
39.	OL St Liguaire Niort (6)	2–1	UA Niort St Florent (6)
40.	AS Portugais Châtellerault (8)	2–0	ES Aubinrorthais (8)
41.	ES Beaumont-St Cyr (8)	1–2	FC Nueillaubiers (6)
42.	FC Comores Bressuire (11)	3–2	US Mélusine (9)
43.	AS Poitiers Gibauderie (11)	1–9	Capaunis ASPTT FC (8)
44.	AS Pays Mellois (9)	1–12	Stade Poitevin FC (5)
45.	Montpon-Ménesplet FC (8)	1–6	CS Feytiat (6)
46.	AS St Sulpice-le-Guérétois (9)	0–2	FC Sarlat-Marcillac (8)
47.	SC Cadaujac (8)	3–2	Langon FC (7)

=== Fifth round ===
These matches were played on 12 and 13 October 2019

Fifth round results: Nouvelle Aquitaine
Tie no	Home team (tier)	Score	Away team (tier)
1.	US Bessines-Morterolles (8)	2–1	AS Portugais Châtellerault (8)
2.	Bleuets Pau (8)	0–3	Genêts Anglet (5)
3.	Aviron Bayonnais FC (5)	2–0	SAG Cestas (6)
4.	JA Biarritz (7)	1–1 (5–3 p)	SA Mérignac (7)
5.	US Bouscataise (7)	1–2 (a.e.t.)	FC St Médard-en-Jalles (6)
6.	FC Marmande 47 (6)	0–3	Pau (3)
7.	FC Libourne (6)	0–1	Stade Poitevin FC (5)
8.	ALFC Fontcouverte (10)	1–7	Bergerac Périgord FC (4)
9.	US Donzenac (7)	0–1	JS Sireuil (7)
10.	CS Boussac (7)	1–4	OL St Liguaire Niort (6)
11.	Thouars Foot 79 (6)	2–2 (3–5 p)	UES Montmorillon (6)
12.	SA Le Palais-sur-Vienne (7)	1–2	FC Chauray (6)
13.	SO Châtellerault (5)	1–1 (4–2 p)	US Chauvigny (5)
14.	Capaunis ASPTT FC (8)	1–0	FC Sarlat-Marcillac (8)
15.	SC Cadaujac (8)	0–1	FC des Portes de l'Entre-Deux-Mers (6)
16.	Hiriburuko Ainhara (6)	0–1	Stade Bordelais (4)
17.	FCE Mérignac Arlac (5)	3–1	ES Boulazac (6)
18.	La Rochelle Villeneuve FC (7)	1–4	US Lège Cap Ferret (5)
19.	FC Mascaret (7)	3–2 (a.e.t.)	FC Thenon-Limeyrat-Fossemagne (7)
20.	AS St Pantaleon (7)	0–2	Trélissac FC (4)
21.	FC Nueillaubiers (6)	1–0	AS Échiré St Gelais (6)
22.	FC Comores Bressuire (11)	0–6	CS Feytiat (6)
23.	Angoulême-Soyaux Charente (4)	1–0	FC Bressuire (5)
24.	FC Pessac Alouette (8)	0–3	Stade Montois (5)

=== Sixth round ===
These matches were played on 26 and 27 October 2019

Sixth round results: Nouvelle Aquitaine
Tie no	Home team (tier)	Score	Away team (tier)
1.	Genêts Anglet (5)	1–2	FC Chauray (6)
2.	US Lège Cap Ferret (5)	1–1 (2–4 p)	Aviron Bayonnais FC (5)
3.	US Bessines-Morterolles (8)	1–4	Angoulême-Soyaux Charente (4)
4.	Stade Montois (5)	2–0	UES Montmorillon (6)
5.	Trélissac FC (4)	1–0	FCE Mérignac Arlac (5)
6.	JS Sireuil (7)	0–0 (4–2 p)	FC des Portes de l'Entre-Deux-Mers (6)
7.	Bergerac Périgord FC (4)	1–1 (4–2 p)	Stade Bordelais (4)
8.	Capaunis ASPTT FC (8)	2–8	Stade Poitevin FC (5)
9.	OL St Liguaire Niort (6)	1–0	JA Biarritz (7)
10.	CS Feytiat (6)	0–4	Pau (3)
11.	FC St Médard-en-Jalles (6)	3–1	FC Mascaret (7)
12.	FC Nueillaubiers (6)	3–1	SO Châtellerault (5)
