= 2018–19 Coupe de France preliminary rounds =

2018–19 Coupe de France
Coupe Charles Simon

Tournament details
- Country: France

The 2018–19 Coupe de France preliminary rounds made up the qualifying competition to decide which teams took part in the main competition from round 7. This was the 102nd season of the main football cup competition of France. The competition was organised by the French Football Federation (FFF) and was open to all clubs in French football, as well as clubs from the overseas departments and territories (Guadeloupe, French Guiana, Martinique, Mayotte, New Caledonia (qualification via 2018 New Caledonia Cup), Tahiti (qualification via 2017–18 Tahiti Cup), Réunion, Saint Martin and Saint Pierre and Miquelon).

== Overseas departments and territories ==
=== French Guiana ===
These matches were played on 21 October 2018.

Tie no	Home team (tier)	Score	Away team (tier)
1.	(French Guiana) ASC Agouado (R1)	1–2	ASE Matoury (R1) (French Guiana)
2.	(French Guiana) US Sinnamary (R1)	3–4	US de Matoury (R1) (French Guiana)

Note: French Guiana League structure (no promotion to French League structure):
Regional 1 (R1)
Regional 2 (R2)

=== Mayotte ===
This match was played on 13 October 2018.

Tie no	Home team (tier)	Score	Away team (tier)
1.	(Mayotte) Diables Noirs (R1)	0–2	FC Mtsapéré (R1) (Mayotte)

Note: Mayotte League structure (no promotion to French League structure):
Régionale 1 (R1)
Régionale 2 (R2)
Régionale 3 (R3)

=== Guadeloupe ===
These matches were played on 23 and 24 October 2018.

Tie no	Home team (tier)	Score	Away team (tier)
1.	(Guadeloupe) CS Moulien (R1)	1–2 (a.e.t.)	JS Vieux-Habitants (R2) (Guadeloupe)
2.	(Guadeloupe) Unité Ste Rosienne (R1)	5–3 (a.e.t.)	AS Le Gosier (R1) (Guadeloupe)

Note: Guadeloupe League structure (no promotion to French League structure):
Ligue Régionale 1 (R1)
Ligue Régionale 2 (R2)
Ligue Régionale 3 (R3)

=== Martinique ===
These matches were played on 23 and 24 October 2018.

Tie no	Home team (tier)	Score	Away team (tier)
1.	(Martinique) RC Rivière-Pilote (R1)	0–1	Aiglon du Lamentin (R1) (Martinique)
2.	(Martinique) Golden Lion FC (R1)	3–1	RC Lorrain (R1) (Martinique)

Note: Martinique League structure (no promotion to French League structure):
Régionale 1 (R1)
Régionale 2 (R2)
Régionale 3 (R3)

=== Réunion ===
These were played on 27 and 28 October 2018.

Tie no	Home team (tier)	Score	Away team (tier)
1.	(Réunion) JS Saint-Pierroise (R1)	0–1	SS Jeanne d'Arc (R1) (Réunion)
2.	(Réunion) La Tamponnaise (R1)	0–0 (2–4 p)	AS Sainte-Suzanne (R1) (Réunion)

Note: Reúnion League structure (no promotion to French League structure):
Régionale 1 (R1)
Régionale 2 (R2)

== Nouvelle-Aquitaine ==
These matches were played on 27 and 28 October 2018.

Tie no	Home team (tier)	Score	Away team (tier)
1.	FCE Mérignac Arlac (5)	1–4	Pau FC (3)
2.	FC Chauray (5)	3–2	CA Neuville (6)
3.	Aviron Bayonnais FC (5)	1–3 (a.e.t.)	La Brède FC (6)
4.	SO Châtellerault (6)	2–1 (a.e.t.)	US Lormont (6)
5.	FC Tartas-St Yaguen (6)	3–1 (a.e.t.)	US Alliance Talençaise (7)
6.	CS Feytiat (6)	0–1	Stade Poitevin FC (5)
7.	Rochefort FC (8)	0–3	Angoulême CFC (5)
8.	Limoges FC (5)	3–0	Tulle Football Corrèze (6)
9.	US Chauvigny (5)	2–0	FC Libourne (6)
10.	La Jarrie FC (10)	0–1	Genêts Anglet (5)
11.	FC Grand St Emilionnais (7)	0–2	Bergerac Périgord FC (4)
12.	Trélissac FC (4)	2–2 (3–4 p)	US Lège Cap Ferret (5)

== Pays de la Loire ==
These matches were played on 27 and 28 October 2018.

Tie no	Home team (tier)	Score	Away team (tier)
1.	FC La Chapelle-des-Marais (8)	3–1	Olympique Chemillé-Melay (8)
2.	AS Mulsanne-Teloché (6)	0–2 (a.e.t.)	SO Cholet (3)
3.	ASC St Médard-de-Doulon Nantes (8)	1–2	AS Bourny Laval (6)
4.	La Malouine Football (8)	1–4	Vendée Fontenay Foot (5)
5.	VS Fertois (6)	0–3 (a.e.t.)	Les Herbiers VF (4)
6.	USJA Carquefou (7)	0–2	FC Challans (5)
7.	ASI Mûrs-Erigné (7)	0–3	AS La Châtaigneraie (6)
8.	FC Rezé (6)	0–2	Vendée Poiré-sur-Vie Football (7)
9.	US Changé (6)	1–3	Le Mans FC (3)
10.	JA Soulgé-sur-Ouette (8)	1–2	JSC Bellevue Nantes (6)
11.	Saint-Nazaire AF (5)	0–1	USSA Vertou (5)

== Centre-Val de Loire ==
These matches were played on 27 October 2018.

Tie no	Home team (tier)	Score	Away team (tier)
1.	AS Montlouis-sur-Loire (5)	0–2	Blois Football 41 (4)
2.	Bourges Foot (5)	5–0	SO Romorantin (4)
3.	Bourges 18 (5)	0–2	Tours FC (3)
4.	Vineuil SF (6)	0–3	Saint-Pryvé Saint-Hilaire FC (4)

== Corsica ==
These matches were played on 27 and 28 October 2018.

Tie no	Home team (tier)	Score	Away team (tier)
1.	SC Bastia (5)	1–1 (4–2 p)	AS Furiani-Agliani (4)
2.	AS Casinca (6)	0–4	FC Bastia-Borgo (4)

== Bourgogne-Franche-Comté ==
These matches were played on 27 and 28 October 2018.

Tie no	Home team (tier)	Score	Away team (tier)
1.	ASM Belfort (4)	1–2	FC Montceau Bourgogne (5)
2.	AEP Pouilley-les-Vignes (8)	0–5	FC Morteau-Montlebon (5)
3.	CO Avallon (5)	0–3 (a.e.t.)	Louhans-Cuiseaux FC (5)
4.	AS Beaune (7)	5–1	US Pont-de-Roide (6)
5.	US Cheminots Paray (6)	2–0	Entente Roche-Novillars (6)
6.	US La Charité (5)	2–0	Sud Nivernais Imphy Decize (6)
7.	ASPTT Dijon (6)	0–3	Besançon Football (5)
8.	ASC Saint-Apollinaire (6)	1–2	FC Gueugnon (5)

== Grand Est ==
These matches were played on 27 and 28 October 2018.

Tie no	Home team (tier)	Score	Away team (tier)
1.	FC Fessenheim (8)	1–2	ES Thaon (5)
2.	FC Soleil Bischheim (6)	1–2	ASC Biesheim (5)
3.	AS Munster (8)	0–5	SC Schiltigheim (4)
4.	FC Obermodern (6)	1–3	FCSR Haguenau (4)
5.	FC Drusenheim (8)	1–3 (a.e.t.)	FC Saint-Louis Neuweg (5)
6.	AS Betschdorf (8)	0–1	FC Rossfeld (8)
7.	AS Vagney (7)	2–3	FA Illkirch Graffenstaden (6)
8.	Olympique Strasbourg (7)	4–0	Racing HW 96 (8)
9.	FC Weitbruch (10)	0–4	US Raon-l'Étape (5)
10.	FC Still 1930 (7)	0–2	US Reipertswiller (6)
11.	Sarreguemines FC (5)	4–0	AS Asfeld (6)
12.	AF Laxou Sapinière (8)	0–1	Étoile Naborienne St Avold (6)
13.	FCA Troyes (5)	2–0	SA Sézanne (6)
14.	AS Prix-lès-Mézières (6)	3–1 (a.e.t.)	ES Villerupt-Thil (7)
15.	ASC Kellermann (8)	1–2 (a.e.t.)	RCS La Chapelle (6)
16.	USA Le Chesne (7)	0–2	RC Épernay Champagne (5)
17.	COS Villers (7)	0–1 (a.e.t.)	SAS Épinal (4)
18.	Le Theux FC (8)	2–6	ES Heillecourt (7)
19.	CA Boulay (6)	3–4 (a.e.t.)	US Avize-Grauves (7)
20.	Jarville JF (6)	0–2	CS Sedan Ardennes (4)

== Méditerranée ==
These matches were played on 27 and 28 October 2018.

Tie no	Home team (tier)	Score	Away team (tier)
1.	Marignane Gignac FC (3)	1–0 (a.e.t.)	RC Grasse (4)
2.	SC Toulon (4)	3–2	AS Cannes (5)
3.	FC Côte Bleue (5)	3–1	Espérance Pernoise (6)
4.	FC Rousset Ste Victoire (7)	1–2	Étoile Fréjus Saint-Raphaël (4)
5.	SC Courthézon (6)	0–1	Hyères FC (4)

== Occitanie ==
These matches were played on 27 and 28 October 2018.

Tie no	Home team (tier)	Score	Away team (tier)
1.	Auch Football (6)	1–1 (3–1 p)	US Colomiers Football (4)
2.	US Salinières Aigues-Mortes (6)	4–0	AS Lattoise (6)
3.	FC Sète 34 (4)	1–0	AS Muret (5)
4.	GC Uchaud (6)	1–2 (a.e.t.)	St Orens FC (7)
5.	Druelle FC (7)	0–5	Rodez AF (3)
6.	US Seysses-Frouzins (7)	0–3	Luzenac AP (6)
7.	Montauban FC (7)	2–3	AF Lozère (5)
8.	Toulouse Rodéo FC (5)	0–1 (a.e.t.)	Canet Roussillon FC (5)
9.	FC Biars-Bretenoux (8)	1–0	FC Naucellois (9)
10.	Entente Golfech-St Paul-d'Espis (6)	1–5	Olympique Alès (5)
11.	Stade Beaucairois (5)	1–0	FC Alberes Argelès (6)

== Hauts-de-France ==
These matches were played on 27 and 28 October 2018.

Tie no	Home team (tier)	Score	Away team (tier)
1.	FC Bondues (8)	1–2	US Nogent (6)
2.	AS Ste Barbe-Oignies (8)	1–3	Iris Club de Croix (4)
3.	US Gravelines (6)	2–1	US Guignicourt (6)
4.	ASC Hazebrouck (8)	6–3	US Ailly-sur-Somme (6)
5.	US Portugais Roubaix Tourcoing (8)	0–0 (3–4 p)	Olympique Saint-Quentin (5)
6.	FC Provillois (10)	0–1	US Saint-Omer (6)
7.	ESM Hamel (12)	0–1	US Vimy (6)
8.	CAS Escaudœuvres (7)	2–1	US Chantilly (5)
9.	US St Maximin (7)	1–1 (6–7 p)	AS Gamaches (6)
10.	AFC Compiègne (6)	3–2	Roubaix SC (7)
11.	ES Mouvalloise (8)	0–10	USL Dunkerque (3)
12.	FC Béthisy (9)	0–1	Wasquehal Football (6)
13.	Amicale Pascal Calais (7)	1–4	Olympique Marcquois Football (5)
14.	AS Beuvry-la-Forêt (9)	1–2	Saint-Amand FC (6)
15.	Château Thierry-Étampes FC (6)	0–0 (2–3 p)	CS Avion (6)
16.	AS Marck (6)	2–1	US Meru Sandricourt (7)
17.	ES Lambresienne (7)	1–2	ESC Longueau (7)
18.	US Mineurs Waziers (6)	1–4	US Boulogne (3)
19.	US Maubeuge (5)	1–2	FC Chambly (3)
20.	US Tourcoing FC (5)	1–3 (a.e.t.)	AS du Pays Neslois (6)

== Normandy ==
These matches were played on 27 and 28 October 2018.

Tie no	Home team (tier)	Score	Away team (tier)
1.	FC Rouen (5)	0–1	USON Mondeville (6)
2.	US Avranches (3)	1–0	US Granville (4)
3.	CMS Oissel (4)	1–0	US Quevilly-Rouen (3)
4.	Bourguébus-Soliers FC (7)	1–2	Grand-Quevilly FC (6)
5.	AL Déville-Maromme (5)	1–3	AG Caennaise (6)
6.	AS Cherbourg Football (5)	0–0 (4–3 p)	FC Dieppe (5)
7.	AJS Ouistreham (7)	2–2 (2–4 p)	AS Villers Houlgate Côte Fleurie (8)
8.	Évreux FC 27 (5)	1–2	FC Saint-Lô Manche (5)

== Bretagne ==
These matches were played on 27 and 28 October 2018.

Tie no	Home team (tier)	Score	Away team (tier)
1.	SC Le Rheu (7)	2–3	GSI Pontivy (5)
2.	Fougères AGLD (5)	0–1	US Concarneau (3)
3.	OC Cesson (6)	2–3	FC Atlantique Vilaine (5)
4.	Lannion FC (5)	2–0	Auray FC (6)
5.	FC Dinardais (7)	1–5 (a.e.t.)	US Montagnarde (5)
6.	AG Plouvorn (6)	5–0	CO Briochin Sportif Ploufraganais (7)
7.	AS Vignoc-Hédé-Guipel (6)	2–1	Loudéac OSC (7)
8.	Stade Pontivyen (5)	2–0	US Trégunc (6)
9.	ES Carantec-Henvic (8)	1–5	Guipavas GdR (6)
10.	Stade Briochin (4)	1–1 (4–5 p)	US Saint-Malo (4)
11.	FC Quimperlois (7)	0–2	AS Vitré (4)
12.	Stade Plabennécois (5)	0–1	Vannes OC (4)
13.	Stade Pleudihennais (7)	1–3	Stella Maris Douarnenez (7)
14.	Avenir Theix (6)	3–0	US Liffré (7)

== Paris-Île-de-France ==
These matches were played on 27 and 28 October 2018.

Tie no	Home team (tier)	Score	Away team (tier)
1.	Claye-Souilly SF (7)	1–2	AF Bobigny (4)
2.	Blanc Mesnil SF (5)	0–3 (a.e.t.)	L'Entente SSG (3)
3.	AC Paris 15 (8)	1–1 (2–4 p)	Noisy-le-Grand FC (6)
4.	Melun FC (6)	2–2 (4–2 p)	Val Yerres Crosne AF (7)
5.	FC Fleury 91 (4)	0–0 (1–3 p)	US Lusitanos Saint-Maur (4)
6.	ES Nanterre (7)	0–1	FC Versailles 78 (5)
7.	AS Poissy (4)	2–2 (1–4 p)	JA Drancy (3)
8.	Sainte-Geneviève Sports (4)	2–0	US Ivry (5)
9.	AS Carrières Grésillons (9)	1–0	US Verneuil-sur-Seine (10)
10.	US Créteil-Lusitanos (4)	6–0	FC Gobelins Paris 13 (5)
11.	ES Viry-Châtillon (6)	2–1	FCM Aubervilliers (5)

== Auvergne-Rhône-Alpes ==
These matches were played on 27 and 28 October 2018.

Tie no	Home team (tier)	Score	Away team (tier)
1.	L'Étrat-La Tour Sportif (8)	0–4	Le Puy Foot 43 Auvergne (4)
2.	US Mozac (9)	2–3 (a.e.t.)	FC Riom (6)
3.	FC Chamalières (5)	4–0	US St Flour (6)
4.	AS Domarin (9)	0–6	AS Lyon-Duchère (3)
5.	CS Meginand (9)	0–4	FC Aurillac Arpajon Cantal Auvergne (5)
6.	CS Volvic (6)	4–1	FCO Firminy-Insersport (7)
7.	AS Misérieux-Trévoux (7)	0–1	Chassieu Décines FC (7)
8.	AS Nord Vignoble (8)	1–2	Montluçon Football (5)
9.	AS Cheminots St Germain (7)	0–3	ASF Andrézieux (4)
10.	ES Foissiat-Étrez (8)	1–7	UMS Montélimar (6)
11.	SC Cruas (7)	0–2	FC Limonest Saint-Didier (5)
12.	AS Donatienne (8)	1–2	Annecy FC (4)
13.	FC Belle Étoile Mercury (9)	0–4	Olympique de Valence (7)
14.	FC Val Lyonnais (8)	2–0	Côte Chaude Sportif (6)
15.	AS Vézeronce-Huert (11)	0–2	Entente Crest-Aouste (8)
16.	FC Échirolles (6)	2–5	FC Villefranche (3)
17.	Entente Val d'Hyères (9)	1–2	US Feillens (7)
18.	US Annecy-le-Vieux (7)	3–2 (a.e.t.)	AS Moulins Foot (5)
19.	Hauts Lyonnais (6)	2–4 (a.e.t.)	Football Bourg-en-Bresse Péronnas 01 (3)
