= Abdul Hakim =

Abdul Hakim (Arabic: عبد الحكيم, romanized: ʻAbd al-Ḥakīm) is a Muslim male given name, and in modern usage, first name or surname. It is built from the Arabic words Abd, al- and Hakim. The name means "servant of the All-wise", Al-Hakīm being one of the names of God in the Qur'an, which give rise to the Muslim theophoric names.

The letter a of the al- is unstressed, and can be transliterated by almost any vowel, often by e. So the first part can appear as Abdel, Abdul or Abd-al. The second part may appear as Hakim, Hakeem, or in other ways. The whole name is subject to variable spacing and hyphenation.

Notable persons with the name Abdul Hakim or variants include:

- Abdul Hakim Sialkoti (1561–1656), Punjabi Muslim scholar
- Abdul Hakim (poet) (1620–1690), Bengali poet
- Abdul Hakim (politician) (died 2014), Bangladesh politician
- Abdul Hakim Sarkar, Bangladeshi professor and academician
- Abdul Hakeem (speaker), Speaker of the East Bengal Legislative Assembly.
- Abdulhakim Arvasi (1865–1943), Turkish Islamic scholar
- Abdul Hakim (writer) (1905–1985), Bangladeshi educationist and mathematician
- Abdel Hakim Amer (1919–1967), Egyptian soldier and politician
- Abdul Hakim (Islamic scholar), member of the National Assembly of Pakistan 1972–1977
- Abdel Hakim Qasem (1934–1990), Egyptian novelist
- Abdul Hakim (footballer) (1949–2022), Bangladeshi footballer
- Abdul Hakim Achmad Aituarauw (born 1954), Indonesian politician and King of Kaimana
- Abdul Hakim Bukhary (born 1955), Saudi held in Guantanamo
- Abdal Hakim Murad, name used by Timothy Winter (born 1960), British Muslim scholar
- Abdelhakim Serrar (born 1961), Algerian footballer
- Abdul Hakim Murad (militant) (born 1968), Pakistani alleged terrorist
- Abdelhakim Bagy (born 1968), Moroccan-French runner
- Maulavi Abdul Hakim Munib (born c. 1971), Afghan politician
- Adel Abdulhehim (born 1974), Uighur-Chinese held in Guantanamo
- Abdul Hakim al-Mousa (born 1976), Saudi held in Guantanmo
- Abdihakem Abdirahman (born 1977), Somali-American long-distance runner
- Abdelhakim Elouaari (born 1980), French footballer
- Abdelhakim Laref (born 1985), Algerian-Belgian footballer
- Abdelhakim Omrani (born 1991), French footballer
- Abdul Hakeem Khan, Pakistani politician
- Abdul Hakim Jan (Argandab tribal leader) (died 2008), Afghan
- Abdel Hakim Tizegha, Algerian alleged terrorist
- Abdel Hakim Shelmani, Libyan football referee
- Abdelhakim Belhadj (born 1966), Libyan anti-Gaddafi military leader

== See also ==
- Abd al-Hakam
