= Miguel Pacios =

French footballer (born 1977)

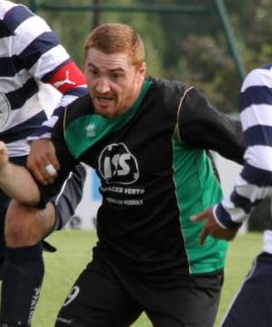

Personal information
- Date of birth: March 10, 1977 (age 49)
- Place of birth: Lormont, France
- Height: 1.79 m (5 ft 10 in)
- Position: Striker

Senior career*
Years	Team	Apps	(Gls)
1999–2000	Libourne-Saint-Seurin	22	(9)
2000–2003	Cannes	75	(4)
2003–2010	Rodez AF	180	(46)
2010–2011	Trélissac FC	20	(4)
2011–2014	Saint Geniez d’olt		
- * Club domestic league appearances and goals

Miguel Pacios (born March 10, 1977) is a French former professional footballer who played as a striker. He played on the professional level in Ligue 2 for Cannes.

== Career ==
Pacios joined Rodez AF from Cannes in 2003 and spent seven years with the club, scoring 65 goals.

== Personal life ==
Pacios is married and has two daughters. After his retirement from playing he worked for the roads department of the departmental council, living in Rodez.
