= Michaël Tronche =

French footballer (born 1978)

Personal information
- Full name: Michaël Tronche
- Date of birth: August 7, 1978 (age 48)
- Place of birth: Clermont-Ferrand, France
- Height: 1.72 m (5 ft 7 1/2 in)
- Position: Midfielder

Team information
- Current team: Trélissac

Senior career*
Years	Team	Apps	(Gls)
1998–2001	Chamois Niortais	3	(0)
2001–2003	Angoulême	56	(4)
2003–2004	Brest	21	(0)
2004–2005	Tours	32	(2)
2006–2007	Moulins	26	(0)
2007–2008	Châtellerault	29	(1)
2008–	Trélissac	?	(?)
- * Club domestic league appearances and goals

Michaël Tronche (born August 7, 1978) is a footballer. He currently plays for Trélissac FC as a defensive midfielder.

== See also ==
- Football in France
- List of football clubs in France
