= Philippe Suywens =

French footballer (born 1971)

Personal information
- Full name: Philippe Suywens
- Date of birth: December 12, 1971 (age 54)
- Place of birth: Lille, France
- Height: 1.85 m (6 ft 1 in)
- Position: Striker

Senior career*
Years	Team	Apps	(Gls)
1988–1990	Valenciennes	0	(0)
1990–1996	Chamois Niortais	96	(18)
1996–1997	Créteil	0	(0)
1997–2002	Châtellerault	142	(48)
2002–2003	Limoges	6	(0)
2003–2004	La Roche-sur-Yon	9	(1)
2004–2005	Vendée Poiré sur Vie	?	(?)
- * Club domestic league appearances and goals

Philippe Suywens (born December 12, 1971) is a former professional footballer who played as a striker.

Suywens played professional football in Ligue 2 with Chamois Niortais F.C. before moving to amateur football with SO Châtellerault.

== See also ==
- Football in France
- List of football clubs in France
