= Hicham Elouaari =

French professional footballer (born 1986)

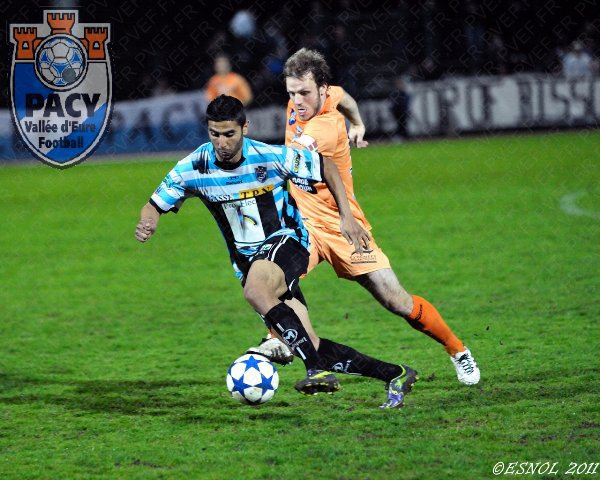

Personal information
- Date of birth: 17 July 1986 (age 40)
- Place of birth: Charleville-Mézières, France
- Height: 1.77 m (5 ft 10 in)
- Position: Forward

Senior career*
Years	Team	Apps	(Gls)
2005–2006	Reims	4	(0)
2006–2007	Reims B		
2007–2010	CS Louhans-Cuiseaux	89	(7)
2010–2011	Pacy	31	(3)
2011–2012	Cognac		
2012–2013	ES Wasquehal		
2013	FC Dieppe	13	(2)
2013–2015	IC Croix	35	(1)
- * Club domestic league appearances and goals

Hicham Elouaari (born 17 July 1986) is a French former professional footballer who played as a forward.

Elouaari was born in Charleville-Mézières. He played professionally in Ligue 2 for Stade Reims. His brother Abdelhakim Elouaari is a former footballer too.
