= Abdelhakim Elouaari =

French footballer (born 1980)

Personal information
- Date of birth: 4 September 1980 (age 46)
- Place of birth: Charleville-Mézières, France
- Height: 1.77 m (5 ft 10 in)
- Position: Midfielder

Senior career*
Years	Team	Apps	(Gls)
2000–2003	Reims	13	(0)
2003–2004	Angoulême		
2004–2005	Romorantin	15	(2)
2005–2006	Albi		
2006–2008	Genêts Anglet		
2008	Paris FC	2	(0)
2009	Moulins	25	(9)
2009–2010	Libourne	30	(9)
2010–2011	Bayonne	23	(1)
2011–2012	Genêts Anglet	29	(12)
2013–2014	Bogny		
- * Club domestic league appearances and goals

Abdelhakim Elouaari (born 4 September 1980) is a French former professional footballer who played as a midfielder.

== Career ==
Elouaari was born in Charleville-Mézières. He played on the professional level in Ligue 2 for Reims. He also played for Angoulême and Romorantin before joining Albi in January 2006.

== Personal life ==
His brother Hicham Elouaari is also a former footballer.
