= Khalid Pashtoon =

Afghan legislator

- Born: Khalid Pashtun Pakhtun Pashtoon; 1959 (age 66–67); Kandahar, Afghanistan
- Occupation: legislator
- Relatives: Hamid Karzai (brother-in-law)

Khalid Pashtoon was elected to represent Kandahar Province in Afghanistan's Wolesi Jirga, the lower house of its National Legislature, in 2005. He is a member of the Pashtun ethnic group from the Barakzai tribe. A report on Kandahar prepared at the Navy Postgraduate School stated he attended the University of Southern California. His Toupee sits on the Internal Security Committee as its deputy chair. He is a former aide to Gul Agha Sherzai.

Khalid Pashtoon was widely quoted when he described assassinated tribal leader Abdul Hakim Jan as the only leader in Kandahar to have opposed the Taliban.
