= Abdul Hakim Jan =

Anti-Taliban militia Leader in Kandahar

Abdul Hakim Jan عبدالحکيم جان
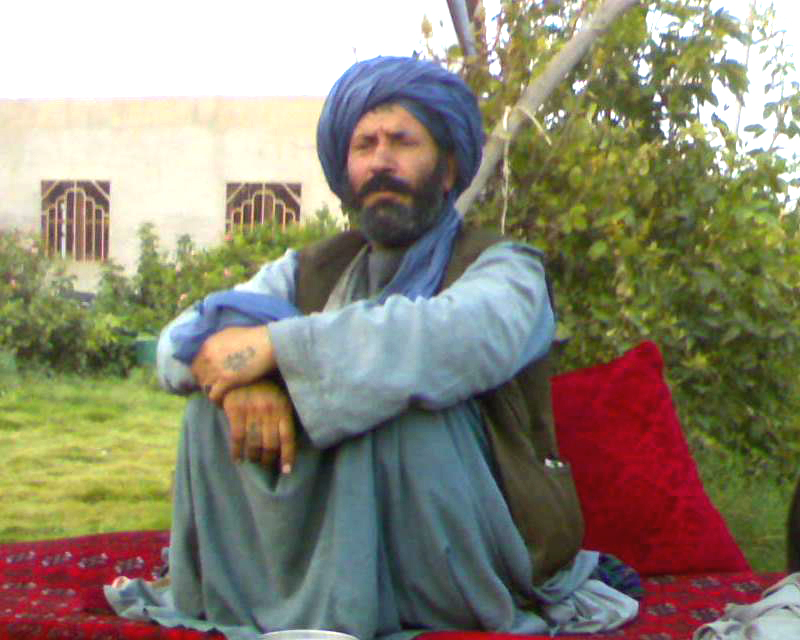
- Born: Kandahar, Arghandab District, Afghanistan
- Died: February 17, 2008; Arghandab District
- Occupation: Chief of Police Kandahar
- Employer: Afghan Government

Abdul Hakim Jan (Note: Pashto: عبدالحکيم جان) (died 17 February 2008) was an Afghan chieftain, politician and anti-Taliban militia leader in Kandahar, Afghanistan. He was killed in a suicide bombing while at a dog fight, on February 17, 2008. The suicide attack that killed him was described as "the deadliest attack of its kind in Afghanistan since the fall of the Taliban", killing approximately 80 people. Abdul Hakim Jan was said to be the target.

Hakim Jan was a former provincial police chief, prior to the Taliban's assumption of power. Wolesi Jirga representative Khalid Pashtoon described him as the only leader to have opposed the Taliban. In October 2007, following the death of Mullah Naqib, he was considered a candidate for leader of the Alokozais tribe. The Globe and Mail described him as "relatively uneducated".
