= Abdel Hakim Tizegha =

An Algerian, Abdel Hakim Tizehga was an alleged member of the Millennium Plot who was arrested ten days after Ahmed Ressam, upon illegally entering the United States from Canada.

Tizegha first traveled to the United States in 1993, as a stowaway aboard a ship docking in Boston. He applied for political asylum, but was denied in 1997, and his appeal failed in 1999.

He moved to Canada and sought refuge while living in Montreal, but sneaked back into the United States later the same year and was arrested.
