= US Chauvigny =

Football club in Chauvigny, France

Chauvigny
- Full name: Union Sportive Chauvinoise
- Stadium: Stade Gilbert Arnault
- Capacity: 2,000
- League: National 3 Group C
- 2022–23: National 3 Group A, 3rd

Union Sportive Chauvinoise, known as US Chauvigny or just Chauvigny, is a football club based in Chauvigny, France. As of the 2024–25 season, it competes in the Championnat National 3, the fifth tier of the French football league system. The team's home matches are played at the Stade Gilbert Arnault.

Chauvigny was promoted to the Championnat National 3 for the first time in the club's history in 2018. In the eighth round of the 2021–22 Coupe de France, the club eliminated Ligue 2 side Le Havre on penalties. Chauvigny was eliminated from the competition following a 3–0 loss to Ligue 1 giants Marseille in the round of 32.
