= Bergerac Périgord FC =

French football club

Bergerac
- Full name: Bergerac Périgord Football Club
- Founded: 1916
- Ground: Stade de Campréal
- Capacity: 2,550
- Chairman: Christophe Fauvel
- Manager: Yassine Azahaf
- League: Régional 3
- 2024–25: National 2 Group A, 13th of 16
- Website: https://www.bergeracperigordfc.fr
Home colours	Away colours

Bergerac Périgord Football Cub, commonly known as Bergerac, is a football club founded in 1916 in Bergerac, Dordogne, France. As of the 2025–26 season, it competes in the Régional 3, the eighth tier in the French football league system. The club's home ground is the Stade de Campréal.+

== History ==
Bergerac Foot was formed in 1916 under the name EF Bergerac. The club achieved promotion to the CFA in 2008 after getting promoted from CFA 2. The club operates a reserve team and their kit manufacturer is the American sportswear company Nike.

On 19 December 2021, Bergerac eliminated Ligue 1 side Metz from the Coupe de France following a 5–4 win on penalties in the round of 64. It was the first time that the club eliminated a first-tier side from the competition. In the round of 16 of the competition on 30 January 2022, Bergerac eliminated Ligue 1 club Saint-Étienne in a 1–0 victory. However, the side from Dordogne were eventually eliminated by fellow fourth-tier team Versailles in a penalty shoot-out in the quarter-finals.

In April 2023, it was announced that the club's first team would be merging with Trélissac-Antonne Périgord ahead of the 2024–25 season. In September 2023, the French Football Federation rejected the merger proposal between the two clubs.

On 7 August 2025, Bergerac was administratively relegated to the Régional 3, the eighth tier of French football.

== Current squad ==
As of 10 January 2024

Note: Flags indicate national team as defined under FIFA eligibility rules; some limited exceptions apply. Players may hold more than one non-FIFA nationality.

No.	Pos.	Nation	Player
55	DF	FRA	Valentin Lienard
1	GK	FRA	Pierre Laborde-Turon
16	GK	FRA	Geoffrey Niccoletti
27	DF	FRA	Mamadou Kamissoko
17	DF	FRA	Jonathan Abonckelet
20	DF	FRA	Loan Husson
3	DF	FRA	Wesley Moustache
5	DF	FRA	Sam Ducros
23	DF	FRA	Steven Luyambula Biwa
8	MF	FRA	Patrick Tchoutang
12	MF	FRA	Christian Gyeboaho
28	MF	FRA	Malek Benkheira

No.	Pos.	Nation	Player
6	MF	FRA	Victor Elissalt (Captain)
4	MF	FRA	Lucas Dumai
10	MF	FRA	Hisham M'Laab
14	MF	POR	César Neto
21	MF	FRA	Nathan Benmoussa
11	FW	FRA	Axel Tressens
7	FW	FRA	Moussa Faty
24	FW	FRA	Romain Escarpit
9	FW	FRA	Valdir Fonseca
22	FW	FRA	Daniel Glao
34	FW	FRA	Rémy Vilela Viera
