= Trélissac-Antonne Périgord FC =

Football club based in Trélissac, France

Trélissac
- Full name: Trélissac-Antonne Périgord Football Club
- Short name: Trélissac, TFC
- Founded: 1950; 76 years ago, as FC des Maurilloux
- Ground: Stade Firmin Daudou
- Capacity: 3,000
- Chairman: Fabrice Faure
- Manager: Pavlé Vostanic
- League: Régional 1
- 2024–25: National 3 Group A, 12th of 14 (Relegated)
Home colours	Away colours

Trélissac-Antonne Périgord Football Club, known as Trélissac, is a football club based in Trélissac, France.

== History ==
In 1950, Football Club des Maurilloux was founded. In 1983, the club merged with FC Trélissac to create FC Trélissac Maurilloux Périgord.

In May 2020, Trélissac FC merged with Antonne-et-Trigonant to form Trélissac-Antonne Périgord FC.

In April 2023, it was announced that the club's first team would be merging with Bergerac Périgord ahead of the 2024–25 season.

== Notable players ==
- (France) Maxence Lacroix (youth)
