= Libourne FA =

French football club, based in Libourne

Libourne
- Full name: Libourne Football Association 2024
- Nickname: The Pinguins
- Founded: 1935; 91 years ago
- Ground: Stade Jean-Antoine Moueix, Libourne
- Capacity: 8,500
- Chairman: Bernard Laydis
- League: National 2 Group B
- 2022–23: National 3 Group A, 1st of 14 (promoted)
- Website: https://www.fclibourne.fr
Home colours	Away colours

Libourne FA (French pronunciation: [ɛf.se libuʁn]), formerly known as AS Libourne or Libourne Saint-Seurin-sur-L'Isle, is a French football team from the town of Libourne in Nouvelle-Aquitaine. The club plays in the Championnat National 1, the fourth tier of French football.

== History ==
The club was founded by Georges Kany in 1935 as Football Club Libourne. The club then became omnisports in 1966 and thus changed its name to Association Sportive Libournaise or simply AS Libourne. Nearly three decades later, in 1998, the club merged with AS Saint-Seurin and became Football Club de Libourne Saint-Seurin-sur-L'Isle. However, in October 2009, this merger was undone: AS Libourne returned to its old name of Football Club Libourne and AS Saint-Seurin disappeared.

The club, nicknamed the penguins, were promoted to Ligue 2 from Championnat National after the 2005–06 season, but relegation followed after finishing 19th in 2007–2008. The downfall continued as far as the seventh tier, which the club were champions of in 2013, earning promotion to the DH Ligue d'Aquitaine for the 2013–14 season.

Since then, the club has twice won promotion to the Championnat National 3, in 2017 and 2020. In 2023 they were promoted back to the fourth tier.

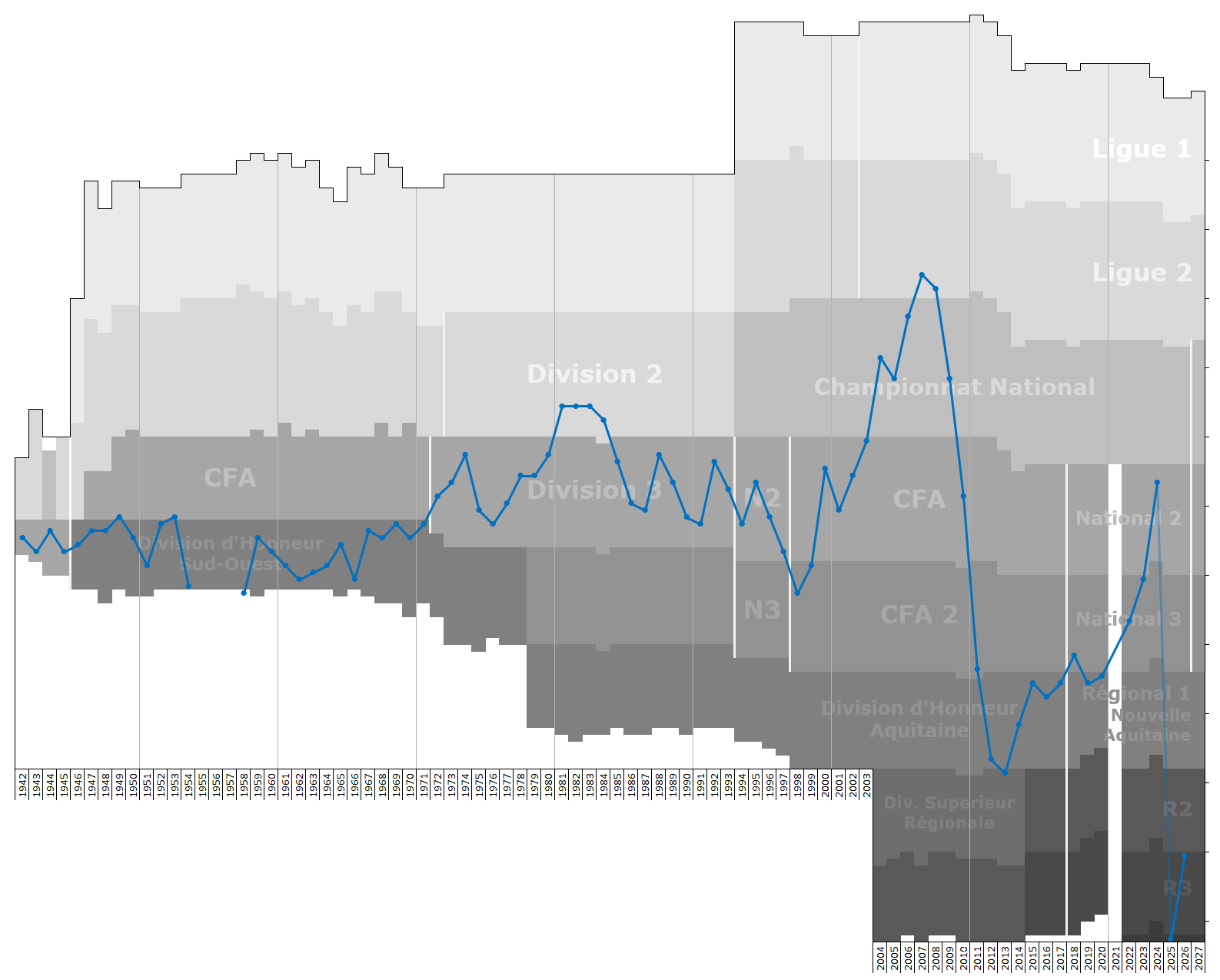
Historical league performance chart of FC Libourne

=== Name changes ===
- Football Club Libourne (1935–1966)
- Association Sportive Libournaise or AS Libourne (1966–1998)
- Football Club de Libourne Saint-Seurin-sur-L'Isle (1998–2009)
- Football Club Libourne (2009–2024)
- Libourne Football Association 2024 (2024–present)

== Former coaches ==
- Stéphane Ziani
- Jean-Marc Furlan

== Notable players ==
- (France) Mathieu Valbuena
