= SO Châtellerault =

French football club

- Full name: Stade Olympique Châtelleraudais
- Founded: 1914
- Ground: Stade de la Montée Rouge
- Capacity: 8,033
- Chairman: Julien Vivier & Hicham Dahmoune
- Head Coach: Wilfried Niflore
- League: National 3 Group B
- 2024–25: National 3 Group F, 6th
- Website: https://sochatellerault.footeo.com
Home colours

Stade Olympique Châtellerault is a French association football club founded in 1914. It is based in Châtellerault, Nouvelle-Aquitaine, France and plays in the Championnat National 3. It plays at the Stade de la Montée Rouge in Châtellerault, which has a capacity of 8,033.

== Season-by-Season ==
Season	Division	Position
1997–98	CFA Group C	11th
1998–99	CFA Group C	4th
1999–2000	CFA Group C	12th
2000–01	CFA Group C	2nd
2001–02	CFA Group C	5th
2002–03	CFA Group D	12th
2003–04	CFA Group D	2nd
2004–05	CFA Group D	2nd
2005–06	Championnat National	16th
2006–07	Championnat National	19th
2007–08	CFA Group D	10th
2008–09	CFA Group C	16th
2009–10	CFA2 Group G	11th
2010–11	CFA2 Group G	8th
2011–12	CFA2 Group G	9th
2012–13	CFA2 Group G	11th
2013–14	CFA2 Group G	10th
2014–15	CFA2 Group B	12th
