= 2023–24 Pau FC season =

Pau FC
2023–24 season
- Manager: Nicolas Usaï
- Stadium: Nouste Camp
- Ligue 2: 10th
- Coupe de France: Round of 64
- Top goalscorer: League: Mons Bassouamina (11); All: Mons Bassouamina; Khalid Boutaïb (11 each)

The 2023–24 season was Pau FC's 65th season in existence and fourth consecutive in the Ligue 2. They also competed in the Coupe de France.

== Players ==
=== First-team squad ===
As of 3 November 2023

Note: Flags indicate national team as defined under FIFA eligibility rules; some limited exceptions apply. Players may hold more than one non-FIFA nationality.

No.	Pos.	Nation	Player
1	GK	SEN	Bingourou Kamara
2	DF	CIV	Thérence Koudou (on loan from Reims)
4	DF	CIV	Xavier Kouassi
5	DF	FRA	Noé Sow
6	MF	BEN	Sessi D'Almeida
7	FW	FRA	Moussa Sylla (on loan from Caen)
8	MF	SEN	Henri Saivet
10	FW	MAR	Khalid Boutaïb
11	FW	CGO	Mons Bassouamina
12	FW	SEN	Pape Massar Djitte
13	MF	FRA	Louis Mouton (on loan from Saint-Etienne)
15	DF	FRA	Marius Ros
17	DF	FRA	Antoine Batisse
18	FW	MTN	Oumar Ngom
19	DF	GUI	Ousmane Kanté

No.	Pos.	Nation	Player
21	MF	FRA	Steeve Beusnard
22	DF	CIV	Ange Ahoussou
23	DF	GAB	Johann Obiang
24	DF	MAD	Kenji-Van Boto
25	DF	FRA	Jean Ruiz
26	DF	FRA	Jean Lambert Evans
27	MF	COM	Iyad Mohamed
28	MF	BEN	Lenny Pirringuel (on loan from Bordeaux)
30	FW	FRA	Yonis Njoh
31	GK	FRA	Quentin Galvez-Diarra
33	FW	FRA	Sonny Degert
40	GK	ALG	Mehdi Jeannin
70	FW	FRA	Charles Boli
85	MF	ARG	Tino Costa
99	FW	FRA	Mehdi Chahiri

=== Out on loan ===
Note: Flags indicate national team as defined under FIFA eligibility rules; some limited exceptions apply. Players may hold more than one non-FIFA nationality.

No.	Pos.	Nation	Player
4	DF	CAN	Diyaeddine Abzi (at CD Leganés until 30 June 2024)

== Transfers ==
=== In ===
Pos.	Player	Transferred from	Fee	Date	Source
GK	(Senegal) Bingourou Kamara	(France) Montpellier	Free	3 July 2023	
MF	(France) Moussa Sylla	(France) Caen	Loan	8 August 2023	
MF	(France) Mehdi Chahiri	(France) Strasbourg	Free	1 September 2023	

=== Out ===
Pos.	Player	Transferred to	Fee	Date	Source
DF	(France) Erwin Koffi	(Azerbaijan) Neftchi Baku		25 July 2023	
DF	(Canada) Diyaeddine Abzi	(Spain) CD Leganés	Loan	14 August 2023	

== Competitions ==
=== Overall record ===
Competition	First match	Last match	Starting round	Final position	Record							
Competition	First match	Last match	Starting round	Final position	Pld	W	D	L	GF	GA	GD	Win %
Ligue 2	5 August 2023	17 May 2024	Matchday 1	10th	38	13	12	13	60	57	+3	34.21
Coupe de France	18 November 2023	5 January 2024	Seventh round	Round of 64	3	2	0	1	7	5	+2	66.67
Total					41	15	12	14	67	62	+5	36.59

Source: Soccerway

=== Ligue 2 ===
==== League table ====
Pos	Team	Pld	W	D	L	GF	GA	GD	Pts	Promotion or Relegation
8	Amiens	38	12	17	9	36	36	0	53	
9	Guingamp	38	13	12	13	44	40	+4	51	
10	Pau	38	13	12	13	60	57	+3	51	
11	Grenoble	38	13	12	13	43	44	−1	51	
12	Bordeaux (D, R)	38	14	9	15	50	52	−2	50 (Note: Bordeaux were deducted 1 point due to federation decision.)	Demoted to National 2

Updated to match(es) played on 17 May 2024. Source: Ligue 2
Rules for classification: 1) Points; 2) Goal difference; 3) Number of goals scored; 4) Head-to-head goal difference; 5) Fair play points
(D) Disqualified; (R) Relegated

==== Results summary ====
Overall								Home						Away					
Pld	W	D	L	GF	GA	GD	Pts	W	D	L	GF	GA	GD	W	D	L	GF	GA	GD
38	13	12	13	60	57	+3	51	7	6	6	32	27	+5	6	6	7	28	30	−2

Last updated: 17 May 2024.

==== Results by round ====
Round	1	2	3	4	5	6	7	8	9	10	11	12	13	14	15	16	17	18	19	20	21	22	23	24	25	26	27	28	29	30	31	32	33	34	35	36	37	38
Ground	H	A	H	A	H	A	H	A	H	A	A	H	A	H	A	H	H	A	H	A	H	A	H	A	H	A	H	A	H	A	H	A	H	A	H	A	H	A
Result	W	L	W	L	D	D	L	W	W	D	L	W	W	D	W	D	W	D	D	L	L	D	D	D	L	W	L	L	W	W	D	W	W	D	L	L	L	L
Position	3	11	4	8	9	11	14	10	8	8	9	7	6	7	5	5	4	5	5	5	10	9	6	9	12	9	10	12	11	9	9	9	6	6	7	9	10	10

Updated to match(es) played on 17 May 2024. Source:
A = Away; H = Home; W = Win; D = Draw; L = Loss

==== Matches ====
The league fixtures were unveiled on 29 June 2023.

7 August 2023 1	Pau	3–0	Bordeaux	Pau
20:45	Saivet 17'; George 19'; Ruiz (yellow card) 44'; Obiang (yellow card) 45+3'; Boutaïb 73'	Report	Vipotnik (penalty missed) 65'	Stadium: Nouste Camp; Referee: Karim Abed

12 August 2023 2	Caen	2–0	Pau	Caen
19:00 CET (UTC+2)				Stadium: Stade Michel d'Ornano

19 August 2023 3	Pau	2–0	Paris FC	Pau
19:00 CET (UTC+2)				Stadium: Nouste Camp

26 September 2023 8	Bastia	1–4	Pau	Furiani
20:45 CET (UTC+2)		Report		Stadium: Stade Armand-Cesari

21 October 2023 11	Ajaccio	2–0	Pau	Ajaccio
19:00 CEST (UTC+2)				Stadium: Stade François Coty

28 October 2023 12	Pau	3–2	Grenoble	Pau
19:00 CEST (UTC+2)				Stadium: Nouste Camp

11 November 2023 14	Pau	4–4	Angers	Pau
19:00 CET (UTC+1)				Stadium: Nouste Camp

25 November 2023 15	Saint-Étienne	1–2	Pau	Saint-Étienne
15:00 CET (UTC+1)		Report		Stadium: Stade Geoffroy-Guichard; Attendance: 21,709; Referee: Faouzi Benchabane

28 November 2023 13	Concarneau	1–2	Pau	Guingamp
19:00 CET (UTC+1)		Report		Stadium: Stade de Roudourou; Attendance: 690

11 November 2023 14	Pau	4–4	Angers	Pau
19:00 CET (UTC+1)		Report		Stadium: Nouste Camp

2 December 2023 16	Pau	1–1	Dunkerque	Pau
19:00 CET (UTC+1)	Saivet 4'	Report	Baghdadi 49' (pen.)	Stadium: Nouste Camp; Referee: Benjamin Lepaysant

5 December 2023 17	Pau	3–1	Valenciennes	Pau
20:45 CET (UTC+1)	Sylla 45+2' (pen.), 89'; Mons Bassouamina 71'	Report	Venema 47'	Stadium: Nouste Camp; Referee: Abdelatif Kherradji

16 December 2023 18	Laval	1–1	Pau	Laval
19:00 CET (UTC+1)	Baldé (yellow card) 28'; Tchokounté (yellow card) 45'; Cherni 51'	Report	Obiang (yellow card) 42'; Sylla 64'	Stadium: Stade Francis Le Basser; Attendance: 6,550; Referee: (France) Benjamin Lepaysant

19 December 2023 19	Pau	1–1	Troyes	Pau
20:45 CET (UTC+1)	Batisse (yellow card) 31'; D'Almeida (yellow card) 47'; Mouton (yellow card) 61'; Sylla 88'	Report	Boura (yellow card) 19'; Dong (yellow card) 44'; Saïd 56'; Chavalerin (yellow card) 89'	Stadium: Nouste Camp; Attendance: 3,153; Referee: (France) Azzedine Souifi

13 January 2024 20	Rodez	2–1	Pau	Rodez
19:00 CET (UTC+1)	Chougrani (yellow card) 20'; Abdallah 53'; Danger (yellow card) 84' (yellow-red card) 88'; Younoussa 90+5'	Report	Ruiz (yellow card) 29'; Mouton (yellow card) 72'; Sylla 88' (pen.)	Stadium: Stade Paul-Lignon; Attendance: 2,913; Referee: (France) Mikael Lesage

23 January 2024 21	Pau	0–1	Saint-Étienne	Pau
20:45 CET (UTC+1)	Kouassi (yellow card) 36'; D'Almeida (yellow card) 85'; Kamara (yellow card) 90+5'	Report	Chambost 38'	Stadium: Nouste Camp; Attendance: 3,524; Referee: (France) Eric Wattellier

27 January 2024 22	Annecy	0–0	Pau	Annecy
19:00 CET (UTC+1)	Hamjatou Soukouna (yellow card) 10'; Escales (yellow card) 90+5'	Report	Mouton (yellow card) 56'; Sylla (yellow card) 90+5'	Stadium: Parc des Sports; Attendance: 3,497; Referee: (France) Abdelatif Kherradji

3 February 2024 23	Pau	2–2	Auxerre	Pau
19:00 CET (UTC+1)	Kouassi (yellow card) 38'; Boutaïb 40' 49'	Report	Onaiwu 2'; Jubal 64' (pen.); Mensah (yellow card) 84'; Léon (yellow card) 90+7'	Stadium: Nouste Camp; Attendance: 3,703; Referee: (France) Mickaël Leleu

10 February 2024 24	Paris FC	1–1	Pau	Paris
19:00 CET (UTC+1)	Camara (yellow card) 65'; Koré (yellow card) 86' (goal) 90+5'	Report	Bassouamina 53'; Beusnard (yellow card) 59'	Stadium: Stade Sébastien Charléty; Attendance: 3,429; Referee: (France) Mikael Lesage

17 February 2024 25	Pau	0–2	Quevilly-Rouen	Pau
19:00 CET (UTC+1)	Boli (yellow card) 80'	Report	Coulibaly 5' (yellow card) 55'; Mamadou Camara 24'; Poha (yellow card) 59'	Stadium: Nouste Camp; Attendance: 3,087; Referee: (France) Guillaume Paradis

24 February 2024 26	Grenoble Foot 38	0–1	Pau	Grenoble
19:00 CET (UTC+1)	Meïssa Ba (yellow card) 72'	Report	Sylla 5'; Beusnard (yellow card) 29'; D'Almeida (yellow card) 54'	Stadium: Stade des Alpes; Attendance: 5,700; Referee: (France) Stéphanie Frappart

2 March 2024 27	Pau	2–3	Caen	Pau
19:00 CET (UTC+1)	Ahoussou (yellow card) 65'; Boli 77'; Ngom 90+1'; Jordy Gaspar (yellow card) 90+8'	Report	Alexandre Mendy 31'; Daubin (yellow card) 61'; Kyeremeh 69'; Salama 85'	Stadium: Nouste Camp; Attendance: 3,068; Referee: (France) Thierry Bouille

9 March 2024 28	Dunkerque	1–0	Pau	Dunkirk
19:00 CET (UTC+1)	Bilingi (yellow card) 58'; Baghdadi 79'	Report	Saivet (yellow card) 38'; Boto (yellow card) 87'	Stadium: Stade Marcel-Tribut; Attendance: 3,495; Referee: (France) Aurélien Petit

16 March 2024 29	Pau	2–0	Concarneau	Pau
19:00 CET (UTC+1)	Ahoussou (yellow card) 17'; Saivet 53' (pen.); Begraoui 74'	Report	Faussurier (yellow card) 3'; Clément Rodrigues (yellow card) 63'; Lebeau (yellow card) 86'	Stadium: Nouste Camp; Attendance: 3,036; Referee: (France) Nicolas Rainville

30 March 2024 30	Amiens SC	2–3	Pau	Amiens
19:00 CET (UTC+1)	Mafouta 18'; Gelin (yellow card) 32'; Kakuta 53'; Urhoghide (yellow card) 64'; Carroll (yellow card) 66'	Report	Boutaïb (yellow card) 17' (goal) 56'; Ahoussou (yellow card) 45+1'; Saivet 60'; Beusnard (yellow card) 64'; Sylla 75'	Stadium: Stade de la Licorne; Attendance: 5,915; Referee: (France) Ahmed Taleb

6 April 2024 31	Pau	1–1	Ajaccio	Pau
19:00 CET (UTC+1)	Ahoussou 23'; Boli (yellow card) 38'	Report	Mangani 6'; Strata (yellow card) 54'; Sakhi (yellow card) 69'	Stadium: Nouste Camp; Attendance: 3,285; Referee: (France) Mickaël Leleu

13 April 2024 32	Valenciennes	1–4	Pau	Valenciennes
19:00 CET (UTC+1)	Linguet (yellow card) 32'; Foe-Ondoa 80'	Report	Boutaïb 7'; Saivet (yellow card) 34'; Mohamed (yellow card) 43'; Ruiz 45+2'; Sylla 64'; Begraoui 82'	Stadium: Stade du Hainaut; Attendance: 6,242; Referee: (France) Jérémie Pignard

20 April 2024 33	Pau	3–0	Laval	Pau
19:00 CET (UTC+1)	Sylla 3' 32'; Beusnard 65'; Boutaïb (yellow card) 74'	Report	Diaw (yellow card) 27'; Tchokounté (yellow card) 35'	Stadium: Nouste Camp; Attendance: 3,516; Referee: (France) Azzedine Souifi

23 April 2024 34	Troyes	2–2	Pau	Troyes
20:45 CET (UTC+1)	Ndiaye (yellow card) 14'; Zoukrou (yellow card) 20'; Chavalerin (yellow card) 45+3'; Dong 72'; Diop 78'	Report	Boli 18'; Bassouamina 90'	Stadium: Stade de l'Aube; Attendance: 5,767; Referee: (France) Guillaume Paradis

27 April 2024 35	Pau	1–2	Guingamp	Pau
19:00 CET (UTC+1)	Kouassi (yellow card) 56'; Ahoussou (yellow card) 87'; Bassouamina 90+2'; Boutaïb (yellow card) 90+5'	Report	Picard 15'; Sivis (yellow card) 56'; Jordy Gaspar 90+3' (o.g.); Siwe (yellow card) 90+5'	Stadium: Nouste Camp; Attendance: 3,482; Referee: (France) Antoine Valnet

3 May 2024 36	Angers	2–1	Pau	Angers
20:00 CET (UTC+1)	Abdelli 12'; Hanin 52'; Kalumba (yellow card) 78'; Zinga (yellow card) 90+5'	Report	Ruiz 56' (yellow card) 63'; Obiang (yellow card) 60'; Jordy Gaspar (yellow card) 82'	Stadium: Stade Raymond Kopa; Attendance: 10,728; Referee: (France) Eric Wattellier

10 May 2024 37	Pau	1–2	Bastia	Pau
20:45 CET (UTC+1)	Costa (yellow card) 3'; Bassouamina 7'; Ruiz (yellow card) 55'; Mouton (yellow card) 74'; D'Almeida (red card) 90+6'	Report	Alfarela 70' 83'; Vincent (yellow card) 76'; Bianchini (yellow card) 90+3'	Stadium: Nouste Camp; Attendance: 3,512; Referee: (France) Rémi Landry

17 May 2024 38	Bordeaux	3–2	Pau	Bordeaux
20:45 CET (UTC+1)	Weissbeck 7'; Livolant 16'; Davitashvili 51'; De Lima (yellow card) 52'	Report	Ruiz (yellow card) 45+3'; Mohamed 46' (yellow card) 89'; Ahoussou (yellow card) 50'; Colléaux (yellow card) 77'; Sylla 90+3'	Stadium: Matmut Atlantique; Attendance: 21,710; Referee: (France) Aurélien Petit

=== Coupe de France ===
18 November 2023 Seventh round	Chauray	0–1	Pau	Chauray
19:00 CET (UTC+1)		Report	Mouton 28'	Stadium: Stade Municipal

9 December 2023 Eighth round	Coulaines	1–5	Pau	Coulaines
14:00 CET (UTC+1)	Bouba Yansane 82'; Ilan Thebert (yellow card) 88'	Report	Mouton 5'; Koudou 19'; Ngom (yellow card) 29'; Boutaïb 59' 67'; Njoh 65'	Stadium: Stade André Conty; Attendance: 1,240; Referee: (France) Léo Beulet

5 January 2024 Round of 64	Pau	1–4	Nantes	Pau
18:00 CET (UTC+1)	Sylla 15'	Report	Mollet 48'; Centonze (yellow card) 77'; Kadewere 80' 83'; Bamba 88'; Douglas Augusto (yellow card) 90+5'	Stadium: Nouste Camp; Attendance: 3,353; Referee: (France) Pierre Gaillouste
