= 2022–23 Pau FC season =

Pau FC
2022–23 season
- Owner: Bernard Laporte-Fray
- President: Bernard Laporte-Fray
- Manager: Didier Tholot
- Stadium: Nouste Camp
- Ligue 2: 13th
- Coupe de France: Round of 32
- Top goalscorer: League: Yanis Begraoui (9); All: Yanis Begraoui (9)
Home colours	Away colours

The 2022–23 season was the 64th in the history of Pau FC and their third consecutive season in the second division. The club participated in Ligue 2 and the Coupe de France.

== Players ==
As of 31 January 2023

Note: Flags indicate national team as defined under FIFA eligibility rules; some limited exceptions apply. Players may hold more than one non-FIFA nationality.

No.	Pos.	Nation	Player
1	GK	FRA	Jérôme Prior
2	DF	CAN	Diyaeddine Abzi
4	MF	CIV	Xavier Kouassi
5	DF	FRA	Noé Sow
6	MF	BEN	Sessi D'Almeida
7	DF	CIV	Erwin Koffi
8	FW	FRA	Loïck Lespinasse
9	FW	CRC	Mayron George
10	MF	SRB	Jovan Nišić
11	FW	CGO	Mons Bassouamina
12	FW	FRA	Eddy Sylvestre
14	FW	FRA	Yanis Begraoui (on loan from Toulouse)
15	DF	FRA	Marius Ros
16	GK	SEN	Massamba Ndiaye

No.	Pos.	Nation	Player
17	DF	FRA	Antoine Batisse
18	FW	GUI	Mohamed Yattara
19	MF	VIE	Nguyễn Quang Hải
20	MF	SEN	Henri Saivet
21	MF	FRA	Steeve Beusnard
23	MF	SCO	Charles Boli
25	MF	FRA	Jean Ruiz
26	DF	FRA	Jean Lambert Evans
27	MF	FRA	Quentin Boisgard (on loan from Lorient)
28	DF	FRA	Nathan Monzango
29	FW	MTN	Pape Ibnou Ba (on loan from Le Havre)
30	GK	FRA	Quentin Galvez-Diarra
33	MF	FRA	Théo Bouchlarhem
34	MF	FRA	Paul Meliande

=== Out on loan ===
Note: Flags indicate national team as defined under FIFA eligibility rules; some limited exceptions apply. Players may hold more than one non-FIFA nationality.

No.	Pos.	Nation	Player
—	FW	FRA	Walid Jarmouni (at Paris 13 Atletico until 30 June 2023)

== Pre-season and friendlies ==
Win Draw Loss

12 July 2022 Friendly	Toulouse	2–0	Pau	Tarbes
18:00 CEST (UTC+2)	Ratão 45'; Ruiz 86' (o.g.)			Stadium: Stade Maurice-Trélut; Attendance: 900; Referee: Azzedine Souifi

15 July 2022 Friendly	Pau	1–0	Angoulême	Saint-Jean-de-Luz
19:00 CEST (UTC+2)	Jarmouni 76'			Stadium: Stade Kéchiloa

23 July 2022 Friendly	Pau	0–1	Niort	Saint-Médard-en-Jalles
19:00 CEST (UTC+2)			Bentil 17'

== Competitions ==
=== Overall record ===
Competition	First match	Last match	Starting round	Final position	Record							
Competition	First match	Last match	Starting round	Final position	Pld	W	D	L	GF	GA	GD	Win %
Ligue 2	30 July 2022	2 June 2023	Matchday 1	13th	38	12	11	15	40	52	−12	31.58
Coupe de France	29 October 2022	22 January 2023	Seventh round	Round of 32	4	3	0	1	6	3	+3	75.00
Total					42	15	11	16	46	55	−9	35.71

Source: Soccerway

=== Ligue 2 ===
==== League table ====
Pos	Team	Pld	W	D	L	GF	GA	GD	Pts
11	Quevilly-Rouen	38	12	14	12	47	49	−2	50
12	Amiens	38	13	8	17	40	52	−12	47
13	Pau	38	12	11	15	40	52	−12	47
14	Rodez	38	11	13	14	39	44	−5	46
15	Laval	38	14	4	20	44	56	−12	46

Source: Ligue 2
Rules for classification: 1) Points; 2) Goal difference; 3) Number of goals scored; 4) Head-to-head goal difference; 5) Fair play points

==== Results summary ====
Overall								Home						Away					
Pld	W	D	L	GF	GA	GD	Pts	W	D	L	GF	GA	GD	W	D	L	GF	GA	GD
38	12	11	15	40	52	−12	47	6	6	7	20	27	−7	6	5	8	20	25	−5

Source: Ligue 2

==== Results by round ====
Round	1	2	3	4	5	6	7
Ground	A	H	A	H	A	A	H
Result	L	D	D	L	L	D	W
Position	19	18	16	18	19	20	19

Source: Ligue 2
A = Away; H = Home; W = Win; D = Draw; L = Loss

==== Matches ====
The league fixtures were announced on 17 June 2022.

30 July 2022 1	Guingamp	4–0	Pau	Guingamp
19:00 CEST (UTC+2)	Livolant 22'; Gaudin 32', 52'; Merghem 34'	Report		Stadium: Stade de Roudourou; Attendance: 7,305; Referee: Mikaël Lesage

6 August 2022 2	Pau	0–0	Dijon	Pau
19:00 CEST (UTC+2)		Report		Stadium: Nouste Camp; Attendance: 3,203; Referee: Abdelatif Kherradji

13 August 2022 3	Le Havre	1–1	Pau	Le Havre
19:00 CEST (UTC+2)	Kechta 21'	Report	Beusnard 82'	Stadium: Stade Océane; Attendance: 4,612; Referee: Azzedine Souifi

20 August 2022 4	Pau	0–3	Sochaux	Pau
19:00 CEST (UTC+2)		Report	Weissbeck 33'; Sissoko 74'; Do Couto 78'	Stadium: Nouste Camp; Attendance: 3,099; Referee: Gaël Angoula

27 August 2022 5	Quevilly-Rouen	2–1	Pau	Le Petit-Quevilly
19:00 CEST (UTC+2)	Soumaré 69'; Sangaré 76'	Report	Saivet 50'	Stadium: Stade Robert Diochon; Attendance: 2,500; Referee: William Toulliou

30 August 2022 6	Caen	1–1	Pau	Caen
20:45 CEST (UTC+2)	Abdi 22'; Vandermersch (yellow card) 72'; Essende (yellow card) 63' (yellow-red card) 90+2'	Report	Saivet 6'; Gomis (yellow card) 38'; Ruiz (yellow card) 43'; Olliero (yellow card) 77'	Stadium: Stade Michel d'Ornano; Attendance: 13,903; Referee: Rémi Landry

5 September 2022 7	Pau	2–2	Saint-Étienne	Pau
20:45 CEST (UTC+2)	D'Almeida (yellow card) 36'; Saivet 68', 79'; Kouassi (yellow card) 83'	Report	Bakayoko (yellow card) 21'; Bouchouari (yellow card) 27'; Mouton 34'; Green (red card) 63'; Maçon (yellow card) 70'; Sergi Palencia (yellow card) 77'; Pintor 85' (pen.), (yellow card) 90+1'	Stadium: Nouste Camp; Attendance: 3,779; Referee: Pierre Legat

10 September 2022 8	Laval	0–1	Pau	Laval
20:45 CEST (UTC+2)	Duterte (yellow card) 90+1'	Report	Yattara (yellow card) 31'; Sow (yellow card) 45'; D'Almeida (yellow card) 76'; Kouassi (yellow card) 82'; Bassouamina 87'	Stadium: Stade Francis Le Basser; Attendance: 5,875; Referee: Antoine Valnet

17 September 2022 9	Pau	1–0	Valenciennes	Pau
19:00 CEST (UTC+2)	Evans (yellow card) 26'; D'Almeida (yellow card) 40'; Gomis (yellow card) 70'; Bassouamina 72'	Report	Debuchy (yellow card) 33' (yellow-red card) 48'; Bonnet (yellow card) 59'	Stadium: Nouste Camp; Attendance: 2,708; Referee: Nicolas Rainville

1 October 2022 10	Metz	1–0	Pau	Metz
19:00 CEST (UTC+2)	N'Diaye 11'	Report	Gomis (yellow card) 27'	Stadium: Stade Saint-Symphorien; Attendance: 11,432; Referee: Willy Delajod

8 October 2022 11	Pau	2–2	Rodez	Pau
19:00 CET (UTC+1)	Sow (yellow card) 14'; Bassouamina (yellow card) 33'; Bâ 45'; Hải 86'	Report	Danger (yellow card) 12'; Pembélé 50'; Ouammou 67'; Boissier (yellow card) 87'; Senaya (yellow card) 87'	Stadium: Nouste Camp; Attendance: 2,744; Referee: William Toulliou

15 October 2022 12	Annecy	0–2	Pau	Annecy
19:00 CET (UTC+1)	Demoncy (yellow card) 21'; Billemaz (yellow card) 25'; Mouanga (yellow card) 75'; Rocchi (yellow card) 80'	Report	Bassouamina 9', (yellow card) 49'; Evans (yellow card) 45+2'; Koffi 79' (pen.)	Stadium: Parc des Sports; Attendance: 5,875; Referee: Abdelatif Kherradji

22 October 2022 13	Pau	1–0	Nîmes	Pau
19:00 CET (UTC+1)	Beusnard 26'; Sylvestre (yellow card) 51'; Sow (yellow card) 59'	Report	Vargas (yellow card) 31'; Djiga (red card) 35'; Tchokounté (yellow card) 48'; Koné (yellow card) 90+2'	Stadium: Nouste Camp; Attendance: 3,328; Referee: Rémi Landry

5 November 2022 14	Pau	2–1	Amiens	Pau
19:00 CET (UTC+1)	Barry 4' (o.g.); Evans 67'	Report	Bandé 82'	Stadium: Nouste Camp; Attendance: 3,261; Referee: Eric Wattellier

12 November 2022 15	Bordeaux	1–1	Pau	Bordeaux
19:00 CET (UTC+1)	Pirringuel 87'; Barbet (yellow card) 89'; Lacoux (yellow card) 89'; Maja (yellow card) 90+4'	Report	Bassouamina 23'; Evans (yellow card) 27'	Stadium: Matmut Atlantique; Attendance: 24,732; Referee: Romain Lissorgue

26 December 2022 16	Pau	0–1	Paris FC	Pau
21:00 CET (UTC+1)		Report	Guilavogui 25'	Stadium: Nouste Camp; Attendance: 3,549; Referee: Mikael Lesage

30 December 2022 17	Niort	2–1	Pau	Niort
21:00 CET (UTC+1)	Boutobba 15'; Durivaux (yellow card) 32'; Renel 50'	Report	Ros (yellow card) 30'; Kouassi (yellow card) 39'; Yattara 54'	Stadium: Stade René Gaillard; Attendance: 2,151; Referee: Marc Bollengier

10 January 2023 18	Pau	0–0	Grenoble	Pau
21:00 CET (UTC+1)	Yattara (yellow card) 48'; Abzi (yellow card) 68'	Report	Diarra (yellow card) 12'; Tchaptchet (yellow card) 72'; Monfray (yellow card) 83'	Stadium: Nouste Camp; Attendance: 2,611; Referee: Guillaume Paradis

13 January 2023 19	Bastia	1–0	Pau	Furiani
20:45 CET (UTC+1)	Sainati (yellow card) 49'; Santelli 77'; Baï (yellow card) 89'	Report	Boli (yellow card) 61'; George (yellow card) 81'; Ruiz (yellow card) 83'	Stadium: Stade Armand-Cesari; Attendance: 8,000; Referee: Pierre Legat

28 January 2023 20	Pau	2–2	Annecy	Pau
19:00 CET (UTC+1)	Bassouamina 53'; Boli 60'; Beusnard (yellow card) 84'	Report	Baldé 6'; Kashi (yellow card) 29'; Sahi 35'; Pajot (yellow card) 54'	Stadium: Nouste Camp; Attendance: 2,643; Referee: Alexandre Perreau Niel

31 January 2022 21	Paris FC	0–1	Pau	Paris
20:45 CET (UTC+1)	Guilavogui (yellow card) 84'	Report	Abzi (yellow card) 75', (goal) 77'	Stadium: Stade Sébastien Charléty; Attendance: 2,072; Referee: Azzédine Souifi

3 February 2023 22	Pau	0–2	Bordeaux	Pau
20:45 CET (UTC+1)	Sylvestre (yellow card) 24'	Report	Fransérgio (yellow card) 13'; Bokele 33'; Bakwa (yellow card) 53'; Badji 67'	Stadium: Nouste Camp; Attendance: 3,821; Referee: Antoine Valnet

11 February 2023 23	Grenoble	1–1	Pau	Grenoble
19:00 CET (UTC+1)	Paquiez (yellow card) 55'; Bénet 73'	Report	Begraoui 19' (pen.); Kouassi (yellow card) 72'; Beusnard (yellow card) 90+4'	Stadium: Stade des Alpes; Attendance: 4,025; Referee: Benoît Millot

18 February 2023 24	Pau	0–1	Laval	Pau
19:00 CET (UTC+1)	Ruiz (yellow card) 16'; Saivet (yellow card) 24'; Abzi (yellow card) 85'	Report	Ruiz 40' (o.g.); Baudry (yellow card) 43'; Tavares (yellow card) 88'	Stadium: Nouste Camp; Attendance: 2,931; Referee: William Toulliou

25 February 2023 25	Saint-Étienne	2–0	Pau	Saint-Étienne
12:00 CET (UTC+1)	Wadji 29'; Krasso 77' (pen.)	Report	Evans (yellow card) 90'	Stadium: Stade Geoffroy-Guichard; Attendance: 21,342; Referee: Benjamin Lepaysant

4 March 2023 26	Amiens	1–0	Pau	Amiens
19:00 CET (UTC+1)	Leautey 6'	Report	D'Almeida (yellow card) 78'; Nišić (yellow card) 89'	Stadium: Stade de la Licorne; Attendance: 6,177; Referee: Abdelatif Kherradji

11 March 2023 27	Pau	1–0	Niort	Pau
19:00 CET (UTC+1)	Boisgard 12'; Beusnard (yellow card) 62'; Monzango (yellow card) 90+1'	Report	Boutobba (yellow card) 39'; Flemmings (yellow card) 78'; Kaboré (yellow card) 79'	Stadium: Nouste Camp; Attendance: 2,531; Referee: Azzédine Souifi

18 March 2023 28	Dijon	0–1	Pau	Dijon
19:00 CET (UTC+1)	Ahlinvi (red card) 50'; Le Bihan (yellow card) 59'	Report	D'Almeida (yellow card) 24'; Begraoui 30'; Evans (yellow card) 40'; Kouassi (yellow card) 54'; Beusnard (yellow card) 85'	Stadium: Stade Gaston-Gérard; Attendance: 8,725; Referee: Mikael Lesage

1 April 2023 29	Pau	0–1	Le Havre	Pau
19:00 CEST (UTC+2)	Kouassi (yellow card) 83'	Report	Grandsir 39'; Cornette (yellow card) 83'; Opéri (yellow card) 83'; Targhalline (yellow card) 90+1'	Stadium: Nouste Camp; Attendance: 3,009; Referee: Benjamin Lepaysant

8 April 2023 30	Pau	1–1	Metz	Pau
19:00 CEST (UTC+2)	Begraoui (yellow card) 49'; Ruiz (yellow card) 68'; George 79'	Report	Candé (yellow card) 44'; Prior 58' (o.g.); N'Duquidi (yellow card) 86'	Stadium: Nouste Camp; Attendance: 2,811; Referee: William Toulliou

15 April 2023 31	Sochaux	2–3	Pau	Montbéliard
19:00 CET (UTC+1)	Kalulu (yellow card) 34'; Weissbeck (yellow card) 45'; Mauricio (yellow card) 54', (goal) 58'; Faussurier (yellow card) 77'; Alvero 90+3'	Report	Sylvestre 10'; D'Almeida (yellow card) 28'; Begraoui 32', 90+6' (pen.); Boisgard (yellow card) 77'	Stadium: Stade Auguste Bonal; Attendance: 11,858; Referee: Faouzi Benchabane

22 April 2023 32	Pau	2–1	Guingamp	Pau
19:00 CEST (UTC+2)	Saivet 14'; Begraoui 73'	Report	Picard 5'; Basilio (red card) 51'; Courtet (yellow card) 62'; Sivis (yellow card) 90+4'	Stadium: Nouste Camp; Attendance: 3,152; Referee: Azzédine Souifi

29 April 2023 33	Nîmes	3–2	Pau	Nîmes
19:00 CET (UTC+1)	Saïd 2'; Tchokounté 44'; Guessoum (yellow card) 80', (goal) 90+3'; Maraval (yellow card) 82'; De Gevigney (yellow card) 85'	Report	Saivet 17'; Abzi (yellow card) 27'; Batisse (yellow card) 45+1'; Kouassi (yellow card) 45+3'; Boisgard (yellow card) 69'; Begraoui 84' (pen.)	Stadium: Stade des Antonins; Attendance: 1,532; Referee: Aurélien Petit

6 May 2023 34	Pau	3–4	Rouen	Pau
19:00 CEST (UTC+2)	Abzi (yellow card) 14'; Saivet (yellow card) 24', (goal) 55'; Begraoui 30' (pen.); George 89'	Report	Ben Youssef (yellow card) 29'; Gbelle 44'; Bangré 57'; Pierret (yellow card) 69'; Sangaré 78'; Jung 90+2'; Mafouta (yellow card) 90+3'	Stadium: Nouste Camp; Attendance: 2,719; Referee: Alexandre Perreau Niel

13 May 2023 35	Valenciennes	1–1	Pau	Valenciennes
19:00 CEST (UTC+2)	Masson (yellow card) 55'; Grbić 66', (yellow card) 68'	Report	D'Almeida (yellow card) 20'; Bassouamina (yellow card) 74'; Kouassi (yellow card) 76'; George 79'	Stadium: Stade Nungesser; Attendance: 12,669; Referee: William Toulliou

20 May 2023 36	Pau	2–6	Bastia	Pau
19:00 CEST (UTC+2)	George 17'; Ruiz (yellow card) 74'; Bassouamina 78' (pen.); Sow (yellow card) 87'	Report	Santelli 20'; Magri 23', 68', 85', (yellow card) 39'; Guidi 56'; Palun 75'	Stadium: Nouste Camp; Attendance: 3,403; Referee: Rémi Landry

26 May 2023 37	Rodez	2–3	Pau	Rodez
20:45 CEST (UTC+2)	M'Pasi (yellow card) 10'; Boissier 19'; Younoussa 74'; Cibois (yellow card) 88'	Report	Begraoui 11' (pen.), 41'; George 26'; Abzi (yellow card) 29'; Boli (yellow card) 90+3'; Batisse (red card) 90+6'	Stadium: Stade Paul-Lignon; Attendance: 3,049; Referee: Faouzi Benchabane

2 June 2023 38	Pau	1–0	Caen	Pau
20:45 CEST (UTC+2)	George 31'; D'Almeida (yellow card) 35' (red card) 77'	Report	Thomas (yellow card) 35'; Sylla (yellow card) 90+3'	Stadium: Nouste Camp; Attendance: 3,676; Referee: Alexandre Perreau Niel

=== Coupe de France ===
29 October 2022 7th Rnd	US Salinières Aigues Mortes	0–3	Pau	Aigues-Mortes
15:00 CEST		Report	Saivet 24'; George 28'; Abzi 83'	Stadium: Stade du Bourgidou; Attendance: 828; Referee: Ahmed Taleb

19 November 2022 8th Rnd	US Colomiers Football	0–1	Pau	Colomiers
18:00 CET		Report	Bassouamina 70'	Stadium: Complexe Sportif Capitany; Attendance: 948; Referee: Nicolas Rainville

6 January 2023 Rnd of 64	Pau	2–1	Montpellier	Bizanos
18:00 CET	Bassouamina 25'; George 82'	Report	Germain 70'	Stadium: Nouste Camp; Attendance: 3,349; Referee: Mathieu Vernice

22 January 2023 Rnd of 32	Lille	2–0	Pau	Villeneuve-d'Ascq
18:30 CET	Kouassi 37' (o.g.); Ang. Gomes 79'	Report		Stadium: Stade Pierre-Mauroy; Attendance: 12,451; Referee: Thomas Léonard
