= 2022–23 Stade Malherbe Caen season =

Caen
2022–23 season
- President: Olivier Pickeu
- Head coach: Stéphane Moulin
- Stadium: Stade Michel d'Ornano
- Ligue 2: 5th
- Coupe de France: Eighth round
- Top goalscorer: League: Alexandre Mendy (19); All: Alexandre Mendy (20)
- Highest home attendance: Le Havre (19,686), 29 Apr. 2023
- Lowest home attendance: Niort (11,142), 8 Oct. 2022
- Biggest win: SMC 4–1 EAG (20 Aug.)
- Biggest defeat: Laval 4–0 SMC (15 Oct.)

The 2022–23 season was the 110th in the history of Stade Malherbe Caen and their fourth consecutive season in the top flight. The club participated in Ligue 2 and the Coupe de France.

== Players ==
As of 10 January 2023.

Note: Flags indicate national team as defined under FIFA eligibility rules; some limited exceptions apply. Players may hold more than one non-FIFA nationality.

No.	Pos.	Nation	Player
1	GK	ALG	Anthony Mandrea
2	DF	TUN	Ali Abdi
3	DF	FRA	Diabé Bolumbu
4	DF	CMR	Adolphe Teikeu
5	DF	RUS	Vladislav Molchan
6	MF	FRA	Quentin Daubin
8	MF	FRA	Jessy Deminguet
9	FW	FRA	Benjamin Jeannot
10	FW	CIV	Caleb Zady Sery
11	FW	FRA	Yoann Court
12	FW	FRA	Mohamed Hafid
13	FW	FRA	Moussa Sylla
14	MF	SWE	Anton Salétros
15	MF	CMR	Franklin Wadja
16	GK	MTQ	Yannis Clementia
17	MF	FRA	Godson Kyeremeh
18	MF	FRA	Hiang'a Mbock

No.	Pos.	Nation	Player
19	FW	GBS	Alexandre Mendy
20	MF	FRA	Noé Lebreton
21	MF	FRA	Bilal Brahimi
22	DF	FRA	Brahim Traoré
23	DF	GAB	Johann Obiang
24	DF	FRA	Hugo Vandermersch
25	MF	FRA	Lamine Sy
27	DF	FRA	Ibrahim Cissé
28	MF	FRA	Djibril Diani
29	DF	FRA	Romain Thomas (captain)
30	GK	FRA	Destiné Jopanguy
36	DF	CMR	Stephen Ewange
77	FW	BEL	Norman Bassette
91	DF	GHA	Emmanuel Ntim
97	MF	CIV	Dieudonné Gaucho Debohi
99	FW	FRA	Samuel Essende

=== Out on loan ===
Note: Flags indicate national team as defined under FIFA eligibility rules; some limited exceptions apply. Players may hold more than one non-FIFA nationality.

No.	Pos.	Nation	Player
—	GK	FRA	Sullivan Péan (at Dunkerque until 30 June 2023)
—	MF	FRA	Ilyes Najim (at FBBP01 until 30 June 2023)

No.	Pos.	Nation	Player
—	FW	FRA	Andréas Hountondji (at Quevilly-Rouen until 30 June 2023)
—	FW	SWE	Zeidane Inoussa (at Real Murcia until 30 June 2023)

== Transfers ==
=== In ===
Pos.	Player	Transferred from	Fee	Date	Source
DF	(Ghana) Emmanuel Ntim	Valenciennes	Undisclosed	22 June 2022	
MF	(Comoros) Iyad Mohamed	Auxerre	Undisclosed	24 June 2022	
MF	(France) Bilal Brahimi	Dunkerque	Undisclosed	27 June 2022	
DF	(Gabon) Johann Obiang	Rodez	Undisclosed	28 June 2022	
FW	(United States) Nicholas Gioacchini	Montpellier	Loan return	1 July 2022	

== Pre-season and friendlies ==
Win Draw Loss Fixtures

9 July 2022 Friendly	Caen (France)	1–0	(France) Ajaccio	Deauville
18:00 CEST (UTC+2)	Mendy 15' (pen.); Court (yellow card) 33'; Mandréa (yellow card) 68'		Mangani (yellow card) 38'	Stadium: Stade du Commandant Hébert

12 July 2022 Friendly	Caen (France)	3–0	(France) Le Mans	Vire
18:00 CEST (UTC+2)	Essende 7'; Bassette 9'; Mendy 66'			Stadium: Stade Pierre Compte; Attendance: 1,350

16 July 2022 Friendly	Caen (France)	0–2	(France) Nantes	Avranches
17:00 CEST (UTC+2)			Blas 18' (pen.); Sissoko 54'	Stadium: Stade René-Fenouillère

20 July 2022 Friendly	Caen (France)	1–2	(France) Rennes	Caen
19:00 CEST (UTC+2)	Kyeremeh 90'	Report	Terrier 39'; Thomas 41' (o.g.); Assignon (yellow card) 84'	Stadium: Stade Michel d'Ornano

23 July 2022 Friendly	Caen (France)	0–0	(France) Versailles	Bayeux
17:00 CEST (UTC+2)	Ntim (yellow card) 7'; Thomas (yellow card) 42'	Report	Armand (yellow card) 38'; Lefebvre (yellow card) 71'	Stadium: Stade Henry Jeanne

== Competitions ==
=== Overall record ===
Competition	First match	Last match	Starting round	Final position	Record							
Competition	First match	Last match	Starting round	Final position	Pld	W	D	L	GF	GA	GD	Win %
Ligue 2	30 July 2022	2 June 2023	Matchday 1	5th	38	16	11	11	52	43	+9	42.11
Coupe de France	30 October 2022	21 December 2022	Seventh round	Eighth round	2	0	1	1	2	5	−3	0.00
Total					40	16	12	12	54	48	+6	40.00

Last updated: 4 June 2023
Source: Soccerway

=== Ligue 2 ===
==== League table ====
Pos	Team	Pld	W	D	L	GF	GA	GD	Pts
3	Bordeaux	38	20	9	9	51	28	+23	69
4	Bastia	38	17	9	12	52	45	+7	60
5	Caen	38	16	11	11	52	43	+9	59
6	Guingamp	38	15	10	13	51	46	+5	55
7	Paris FC	38	15	10	13	45	43	+2	55

Source: Ligue 2
Rules for classification: 1) Points; 2) Goal difference; 3) Number of goals scored; 4) Head-to-head goal difference; 5) Fair play points

==== Results summary ====
Overall								Home						Away					
Pld	W	D	L	GF	GA	GD	Pts	W	D	L	GF	GA	GD	W	D	L	GF	GA	GD
38	16	11	11	52	43	+9	59	11	6	2	32	18	+14	5	5	9	20	25	−5

Last updated: 4 June 2023.
Source: Ligue 2

==== Results by round ====
Round	1	2	3	4	5	6	7	8	9	10	11	12	13	14	15	16	17	18	19	20	21	22	23	24	25	26	27	28	29	30	31	32	33	34	35	36	37	38
Ground	A	H	A	H	A	H	A	H	A	H	H	A	H	A	H	A	A	H	A	H	A	H	A	H	A	H	A	H	H	A	H	A	H	A	H	A	H	A
Result	W	W	D	W	D	D	L	W	L	L	W	L	W	D	D	L	D	D	W	D	L	W	D	W	W	D	L	W	W	L	W	W	L	L	W	W	D	L
Position	6	2	3	1	1	1	3	3	6	8	6	8	7	7	5	7	7	8	7	8	8	8	8	6	5	6	7	6	6	7	6	6	6	6	5	5	5	5

Updated to match(es) played on 4 June 2023. Source: Ligue 2
A = Away; H = Home; W = Win; D = Draw; L = Loss

==== Matches ====
The league fixtures were announced on 17 June 2022.

30 July 2022 1	Nîmes	0–1	Caen	Nîmes
19:00 CEST (UTC+2)	Guessoum (yellow card) 17'; Fomba (yellow card) 43'; Durand de Gevigney (yellow card) 67'	Report	Mendy (yellow card) 45+2'; Essende (yellow card) 76'; Kyeremeh 90+3'	Stadium: Stade des Costières; Attendance: 2,969; Referee: Rémi Landry

8 August 2022 2	Caen	1–0	Metz	Caen
20:45 CEST (UTC+2)	Diani 38'; Vandermersch (yellow card) 90+3'	Report	Candé (yellow card) 27'; Maïga (yellow card) 29'; Mikautadze (yellow card) 45+3'; Yade (yellow card) 86'	Stadium: Stade Michel d'Ornano; Attendance: 15,360; Referee: Marc Bollengier

13 August 2022 3	Dijon	2–2	Caen	Dijon
19:00 CEST (UTC+2)	Le Bihan (yellow card) 45+2'; Silva 60'; Congré (yellow card) 66'; Thioune (yellow card) 79'; Soumaré 90' (pen.)	Report	Mendy 49'; Daubin (yellow card) 76'; Traoré 87' (o.g.); Abdi (yellow card) 89'	Stadium: Stade Gaston Gérard; Attendance: 7,342; Referee: Pierre Legat

20 August 2022 4	Caen	4–1	Guingamp	Caen
19:00 CEST (UTC+2)	Ntim 18'; Mendy 19'; Brahimi (yellow card) 49'; Essende 52'; Mandrea (yellow card) 66'; Thomas (yellow card) 66'; Jeannot 76' (pen.)	Report	Barthelmé 6'; Quemper (yellow card) 12'; Cathline (yellow card) 66'; Livolant (yellow card) 66'; Diarra (yellow card) 78' (red card) 79'	Stadium: Stade Michel d'Ornano; Attendance: 14,120; Referee: Nicolas Rainville

27 August 2022 5	Paris FC	1–1	Caen	Paris
19:00 CEST (UTC+2)	Karamoko (yellow card) 43'; Chergui (yellow card) 75'; López 87'; Name (yellow card) 90+3'	Report	Thomas 44'; Teikeu (yellow card) 53'; Mohamed (yellow card) 86'	Stadium: Stade Sébastien Charléty; Attendance: 4,179; Referee: Alexandre Perreau Niel

30 August 2022 6	Caen	1–1	Pau	Caen
20:45 CEST (UTC+2)	Abdi 22'; Vandermersch (yellow card) 72'; Essende (yellow card) 63' (yellow-red card) 90+2'	Report	Saivet 6'; Gomis (yellow card) 38'; Ruiz (yellow card) 43'; Olliero (yellow card) 77'	Stadium: Stade Michel d'Ornano; Attendance: 13,903; Referee: Rémi Landry

2 September 2022 7	Le Havre	2–1	Caen	Le Havre
20:45 CEST (UTC+2)	Lekhal 7' (pen.); Lloris (yellow card) 24'; Kitala (yellow card) 45+3'; Sangante (yellow card) 56'; Thiaré 76'	Report	Thomas (yellow card) 6'; Mendy (yellow card) 45+1'; Kyeremeh 90+1'	Stadium: Stade Océane; Attendance: 16,007; Referee: Abdelatif Kherradji

10 September 2022 8	Caen	3–1	Amiens	Caen
19:00 CEST (UTC+2)	Thomas (yellow card) 42' (goal) 71'; Mendy 46'; Vandermersch (yellow card) 52'; Essende 56'	Report	Barry (yellow card) 40'; Mendy 82'	Stadium: Stade Michel d'Ornano; Attendance: 12,583; Referee: Aurélien Petit

17 September 2022 9	Grenoble	1–0	Caen	Grenoble
19:00 CEST (UTC+2)	Paquiez (yellow card) 22' (yellow-red card) 37'; Ba (yellow card) 45+1'; Tell 66'	Report	Thomas (yellow card) 71'	Stadium: Stade des Alpes; Attendance: 4,446; Referee: Faouzi Benchabane

1 October 2022 10	Caen	0–1	Quevilly-Rouen Métropole	Caen
19:00 CEST (UTC+2)	Cissé (yellow card) 47'; Teikeu (yellow card) 88'	Report	Camara 29'; Sidibé (yellow card) 47'; Pendant (yellow card) 83'; Sangaré (yellow card) 87'	Stadium: Stade Michel d'Ornano; Attendance: 13,031; Referee: Olivier Thual

8 October 2022 11	Caen	1–0	Niort	Caen
19:00 CEST (UTC+2)	Deminguet (yellow card) 45+3'; Kyeremeh 45+4'; Obiang (yellow card) 50'; Mendy (yellow card) 67'; Brahimi (yellow card) 90'	Report	Vallier (yellow card) 43'	Stadium: Stade Michel d'Ornano; Attendance: 11,142; Referee: Gaël Angoula

15 October 2022 12	Laval	4–0	Caen	Laval
19:00 CEST (UTC+2)	Baldé 13'; Durbant 31'; Naidji (yellow card) 33'; Sanna 57'; Adéoti 87'	Report	Thomas (yellow card) 61'; Abdi (yellow card) 88'	Stadium: Stade Francis Le Basser; Attendance: 8,702; Referee: William Toulliou

22 October 2022 13	Caen	2–0	Rodez	Caen
19:00 CEST (UTC+2)	Daubin (yellow card) 49'; Abdi (yellow card) 57'; Mendy 68'; Essende 71'; Ntim (yellow card) 86'	Report	Abdallah (red card) 44'; Chougrani (yellow card) 86'	Stadium: Stade Michel d'Ornano; Attendance: 11,197; Referee: Guillaume Paradis

5 November 2022 14	Valenciennes	1–1	Caen	Valenciennes
19:00 CET (UTC+1)	Cuffaut 39' (pen.) (yellow card) 56'; Noubissi (yellow card) 88'	Report	Ntim (yellow card) 6'; Mendy 23'; Mandrea (yellow card) 37'; Thomas (yellow card) 41'; Abdi (yellow card) 90+1'	Stadium: Stade du Hainaut; Attendance: 11,212; Referee: Abdelatif Kherradji

12 November 2022 15	Caen	0–0	Annecy	Caen
19:00 CET (UTC+1)	Mbock (yellow card) 40'; Brahimi (yellow card) 85'; Ntim (yellow card) 90+1'	Report	Mendy (yellow card) 10'; Lajugie (yellow card) 67'; Pajot (yellow card) 78'; Mouanga (yellow card) 78'; Shamal (yellow card) 79'; Temanfo (yellow card) 90+4'	Stadium: Stade Michel d'Ornano; Attendance: 16,013; Referee: Olivier Thual

26 December 2022 16	Bastia	1–0	Caen	Furiani
21:00 CET (UTC+1)	Schur (yellow card) 25'; Kaïboué (yellow card) 77'; Vincent (yellow card) 78'; Baï 90+1' (red card) 90+3'	Report		Stadium: Stade Armand-Cesari; Referee: Aurélien Petit

30 December 2022 17	Saint-Étienne	1–1	Caen	Saint-Étienne
19:05 CET (UTC+1)	Bakayoko (yellow card) 15'; Nadé (yellow card) 39'; Charbonnier (yellow card) 73' (goal) 90+2'; Bouchouari (yellow card) 79'	Report	Mendy 17' (pen.) (yellow card) 45+1'; Kyeremeh (yellow card) 43'; Abdi (yellow card) 45+2'	Stadium: Stade Geoffroy-Guichard; Attendance: 14,785; Referee: Alexandre Perreau Niel

10 January 2023 18	Caen	2–2	Bordeaux	Caen
20:45 CET (UTC+1)	Thomas (yellow card) 23'; Mendy 51'; Abdi 81'; Vandermersch (yellow card) 86'; Court (red card) 87'	Report	Maja 3', 24'; Michelin (yellow card) 38' (red card) 67'; Ihnatenko (yellow card) 53'; Barbet (yellow card) 68'; Elis (yellow card) 87'; Bakwa (yellow card) 90'	Stadium: Stade Michel d'Ornano; Attendance: 15,554; Referee: Romain Lissorgue

20 January 2023 19	Sochaux	1–2	Caen	Montbéliard
18:30 CET (UTC+1)	Doumbia 8'; Kanouté (yellow card) 26'; Aaneba (yellow card) 76'	Report	Daubin (yellow card) 58'; Mendy 64' (pen.); Brahimi 89'	Stadium: Stade Auguste Bonal; Attendance: 8,771; Referee: Azzédine Souifi

28 January 2023 20	Caen	0–0	Laval	Caen
19:00 CET (UTC+1)		Report	Baudry (yellow card) 80'	Stadium: Stade Michel d'Ornano; Attendance: 12,912; Referee: Gaël Angoula

31 January 2023 21	Annecy	2–0	Caen	Annecy
20:45 CET (UTC+1)	Kashi (yellow card) 48'; Billemaz 67'; Lajugie (yellow card) 76'; Testud 80'	Report	Thomas (yellow card) 44'; Vandermersch (yellow card) 62'; Mbock (yellow card) 64'; Daubin (yellow card) 82'	Stadium: Parc des Sports; Attendance: 6,156; Referee: Guillaume Paradis

3 February 2023 22	Caen	3–1	Bastia	Caen
20:45 CET (UTC+1)	Brahimi (yellow card) 40'; Salétros 50'; Ntim (yellow card) 61'; Mendy 69' (pen.), 82'	Report	Ducrocq (yellow card) 31'; Sainati (yellow card) 63'; Salles-Lamonge (yellow card) 71'; Baï 88'	Stadium: Stade Michel d'Ornano; Attendance: 11,500; Referee: Faouzi Benchabane

13 February 2023 23	Metz	0–0	Caen	Metz
20:45 CEST (UTC+2)		Report		Stadium: Stade Saint-Symphorien; Attendance: 13,790; Referee: Marc Bollengier

18 February 2023 24	Caen	2–1	Grenoble	Caen
19:00 CET (UTC+1)	Daubin (yellow card) 26'; Mendy 65'; Bassette 90+3'	Report	Phaëton 24'; Bambock (yellow card) 66'	Stadium: Stade Michel d'Ornano; Attendance: 11,892; Referee: Thomas Léonard

25 February 2023 25	Guingamp	1–2	Caen	Guingamp
19:00 CET (UTC+1)	Muyumba (yellow card) 53'; El Ouazzani 54'; Quemper (yellow card) 62'	Report	Court 19' (yellow card) 90+2'; Kyeremeh 42'; Deminguet (yellow card) 79'	Stadium: Stade de Roudourou; Attendance: 8,060; Referee: Olivier Thual

6 March 2023 26	Caen	0–0	Sochaux	Caen
20:45 CET (UTC+1)	Court (yellow card) 29'; Cissé (yellow card) 54'	Report	Weissbeck (yellow card) 55'	Stadium: Stade Michel d'Ornano; Attendance: 15,125; Referee: Romain Lissorgue

11 March 2023 27	Rodez	3–2	Caen	Rodez
19:00 CET (UTC+1)	Soumano 15'; Raux-Yao 27'; Corredor 54'; Pembélé (yellow card) 84'; Abdallah (yellow card) 89'; Mendes (yellow card) 90'	Report	Court 38'; Diani (yellow card) 90'; Abdi 90+2'	Stadium: Stade Paul-Lignon; Attendance: 2,012; Referee: Faouzi Benchabane

18 March 2023 28	Caen	2–1	Valenciennes	Caen
19:00 CET (UTC+1)	Brahimi 8'; Mendy (yellow card) 45' (goal) 76'; Vandermersch (yellow card) 62'; Hafid (yellow card) 90'	Report	Bonnet 29'	Stadium: Stade Michel d'Ornano; Attendance: 11,825; Referee: Clément Turpin

1 April 2023 29	Caen	2–1	Dijon	Caen
19:00 CEST (UTC+2)	Mendy (yellow card) 54' (goal) 70' (pen.); Brahimi 60'	Report	Touré 2' (yellow card) 68'; Thioune (yellow card) 68'	Stadium: Stade Michel d'Ornano; Attendance: 13,341; Referee: Guillaume Paradis

8 April 2023 30	Quevilly-Rouen Métropole	2–1	Caen	Rouen
19:00 CEST (UTC+2)	Jung 20'; Sangaré 38'; Sidibé (yellow card) 46' (yellow-red card) 57'; Gbelle (yellow card) 52'	Report	Vandermersch (yellow card) 40'; Mendy (penalty scored) 59', (yellow card) 88'; Diani (yellow card) 89'	Stadium: Stade Robert Diochon; Attendance: 4,591; Referee: Nicolas Rainville

15 April 2023 31	Caen	3–1	Paris FC	Caen
19:00 CEST (UTC+2)	Mendy 16'; Chergui 45' (o.g.); Kyeremeh 75'	Report	Kanté (yellow card) 68'; Lefort (yellow card) 75'; Ntim 82' (o.g.)	Stadium: Stade Michel d'Ornano; Attendance: 12,537; Referee: Aurélien Petit

22 April 2023 32	Niort	1–2	Caen	Niort
19:00 CEST (UTC+2)	Mandrea 55' (o.g.)	Report	Thomas 13'; Kilama 32' (o.g.); Daubin (yellow card) 32'	Stadium: Stade René Gaillard; Attendance: 2,184; Referee: William Toulliou

29 April 2023 33	Caen	1–2	Le Havre	Caen
14:45 CEST (UTC+2)	Ntim 89'	Report	Lloris 42'; Casimir (yellow card) 52'; Targhalline 56'; Richardson (red card) 90+5'	Stadium: Stade Michel d'Ornano; Attendance: 19,686; Referee: Romain Lissorgue

6 May 2023 34	Bordeaux	1–0	Caen	Bordeaux
15:00 CEST (UTC+2)	Davistashvili 16'	Report	Mbock (yellow card) 14'; Diani (yellow card) 89'	Stadium: Matmut Atlantique; Attendance: 27,061; Referee: Mathieu Vernice

13 May 2023 35	Caen	4–2	Nîmes	Caen
19:00 CEST (UTC+2)	Mendy (penalty scored) 57; Mbock 69'; Mendy (penalty scored) 83; Kyeremeh (yellow card) 77' (goal) 90+3'	Report	Vargas 53'; Zerkane (yellow card) 82'; Saïd 84'	Stadium: Stade Michel d'Ornano; Attendance: 14,611; Referee: Pierre Legat

20 May 2023 36	Amiens	1–3	Caen	Amiens
19:00 CEST (UTC+2)	Gomis 13' (yellow card) 79'	Report	Thomas 40' (yellow card) 66'; Vandermersch 60'; Mendy 70'	Stadium: Stade de la Licorne; Attendance: 6,714; Referee: Gaël Angoula

26 May 2023 37	Caen	2–2	Saint-Étienne	Caen
20:45 CEST (UTC+2)	Ntim (yellow card) 30'; Mendy 83'; Essende 85'	Report	Wadji 15', 23'; Moueffek (yellow card) 57'; Larsonneur (yellow card) 81'	Stadium: Stade Michel d'Ornano; Attendance: 19,537; Referee: Olivier Thual

2 June 2023 38	Pau	1–0	Caen	Pau
20:45 CEST (UTC+2)	George 31'; D'Almeida (yellow card) 35' (red card) 77'	Report	Thomas (yellow card) 35'; Sylla (yellow card) 90+3'	Stadium: Nouste Camp; Attendance: 3,676; Referee: Alexandre Perreau Niel

=== Coupe de France ===
29 October 2022 Seventh round	Saint-Malo	2–2 (3–4 p)	Caen	Saint-Malo
18:00 CEST (UTC+2)	Barroug 41'; Heinry 90+4'	Report	Deminguet 65'; Mendy 84'	Stadium: Stade de Marville; Referee: Gabriel Henry

21 December 2022 Eighth round	AF Virois	0–3 (Note: Although the match finished 3–0 to Caen, a challenge was lodged over the eligibility of substitute Dieudonné Gaucho, with the claim being that the player was under a suspension. The challenge was upheld by the FFF on 27 December 2022, meaning Caen were disqualified from the competition, and AF Virois qualified for the next round.)	Caen	Caen
18:00 CET (UTC+1)		Report	Essende 13'; A. Mendy 38'; Kyeremeh 85'	Stadium: Stade Michel d'Ornano; Attendance: 4,478; Referee: Mickaël Leleu
