= Sonny Degert =

French association football player (born 2001)

Personal information
- Date of birth: 21 December 2001 (age 24)
- Place of birth: Bordeaux, France
- Height: 1.75 m (5 ft 9 in)
- Position: Striker

Team information
- Current team: Bayonne
- Number: 21

Youth career
- 2008–2011: FCE Mérignac-Arlac
- 2011–2015: FC Girondins de Bordeaux
- 2015–2018: FCE Mérignac-Arlac

Senior career*
Years	Team	Apps	(Gls)
2018–2019	FCE Mérignac-Arlac	13	(10)
2019–2021	Bergerac	2	(0)
2021–2022	Pouzauges	23	(11)
2022–2024	Pau B	40	(15)
2023–2024	Pau	3	(0)
2024–2025	St-Pryvé St-Hilaire	23	(5)
2025–	Bayonne	8	(0)
- * Club domestic league appearances and goals as of 30 November 2024

Sonny Degert (born 21 December 2001) is a French professional footballer who plays as a forward for National 2 club Bayonne.

== Career ==
Born in Bordeaux, Degert began his football journey with his local team FCE Mérignac-Arlac at the age of 5. He later joined FC Girondins de Bordeaux at 10 but found himself back at FCE Mérignac-Arlac in 2015. His debut for the Mérignac-Arlac senior team arrived in 2019, where he showcased his skills in the Championnat National 3, the fifth division of the French football league system.

Following a stint at ambitious Bergerac in the Championnat National 2, where he featured in just 2 matches over 2 seasons, Degert sought to reignite his goal-scoring prowess with a move to Pouzaugues in National 3. His impressive performance led to a transfer to Pau FC's reserve side at the outset of the 2022–23 Pau FC season. Netting 12 goals in 24 matches caught the attention of the new coach, Nicolas Usaï, who seamlessly integrated him into the Pau FC main squad for the 2023–24 season in Ligue 2. Degert made his Pau debut during a 2–0 Ligue 2 loss against SM Caen on 12 August 2023.

In August 2024, Degert joined Saint-Pryvé Saint-Hilaire FC.

== Personal life ==
Initially trained as a midfielder, Degert transitioned into a striker when he made his debut for the Merignac first team.
