= Jean-Claude Larrieu =

Jean-Claude Larrieu may refer to:

- Jean-Claude Larrieu (cinematographer), French cinematographer
- Jean-Claude Larrieu (footballer) (born 1946), French football player
