= Ahoussou =

Ahoussou is a surname. Notable people with the surname include:

- Ange Ahoussou (born 2003), Ivorian footballer
- Jeannot Ahoussou-Kouadio (born 1951), Ivorian politician
