= Thérence Koudou =

French footballer (born 2004)

Personal information
- Full name: Thérence Ange Koudou
- Date of birth: 13 December 2004 (age 21)
- Place of birth: Livry-Gargan, France
- Height: 1.78 m (5 ft 10 in)
- Position: Right-back

Team information
- Current team: Mechelen
- Number: 7

Youth career
- 2010–2011: ES Goelly
- 2011–2013: Compans FC
- 2013–2015: FC Villepinte
- 2015–2019: Torcy
- 2019–2021: Reims

Senior career*
Years	Team	Apps	(Gls)
2021–2023	Reims II	42	(0)
2023–2024	Reims	9	(0)
2023–2024	→ Pau (loan)	12	(0)
2024–2025	Pau	31	(2)
2025–	Mechelen	37	(5)

International career^{‡}
2020	France U16	3	(0)
2021–2022	France U18	6	(0)
2022–2023	France U19	7	(0)
2023–2024	France U20	10	(0)
2025–	France U21	1	(0)
- * Club domestic league appearances and goals as of 31 May 2026 ‡ National team caps and goals as of 8 September 2025

Thérence Ange Koudou (born 13 December 2004) is a French professional footballer who plays as a right-back for Belgian Pro League club Mechelen.

== Club career ==
Koudou is a youth product of the academies of ES Goelly, Compans FC, FC Villepinte, and Torcy before moving to Reims youth academy on 10 May 2017. He began his senior career with the reserves of Reims in 2021. On 8 February 2023, he signed his first professional contract with Reims until 2026. On 12 May 2023, he made his professional debut with Reims in a 2–1 Ligue 1 loss to Olympique de Marseille.

=== Loan to Pau FC ===
Following his brief stint with the first team, Koudou's development was deemed essential, and a decision was made to further his progress through a loan spell. Thus, he was loaned to Pau FC, a club competing in Ligue 2, the second tier of French football. Pau, known for nurturing young talent, was considered the ideal destination for the talented right-back.

In Béarn, Koudou quickly becomes an undisputed starter at the right-back position, showing great maturity despite his young age.

=== Transfer to Pau FC ===
In August 2024, Thérence Koudou joined Pau FC on a permanent basis after the first matchday of the 2024–25 Ligue 2 season, in a transfer with undisclosed financial terms. Koudou is expected to compete with his successor, Jordy Gaspar, for the right-back position. Despite interest from other clubs such as FC Basel and Troyes AC, Koudou chose to return to Pau after a successful loan spell in the previous season. His transfer includes a resale percentage in favor of Stade de Reims.

=== Mechelen ===
On 23 July 2025, Koudou signed a four-year contract with Mechelen in Belgium.

== International career ==
Born in France, Koudou is of Ivorian descent. He was called up to the France U20s for the 2023 FIFA U-20 World Cup.

== Personal life ==
Koudou's twin brother, Maxence, is also a footballer.
