= Jean Ruiz =

French footballer (born 1998)

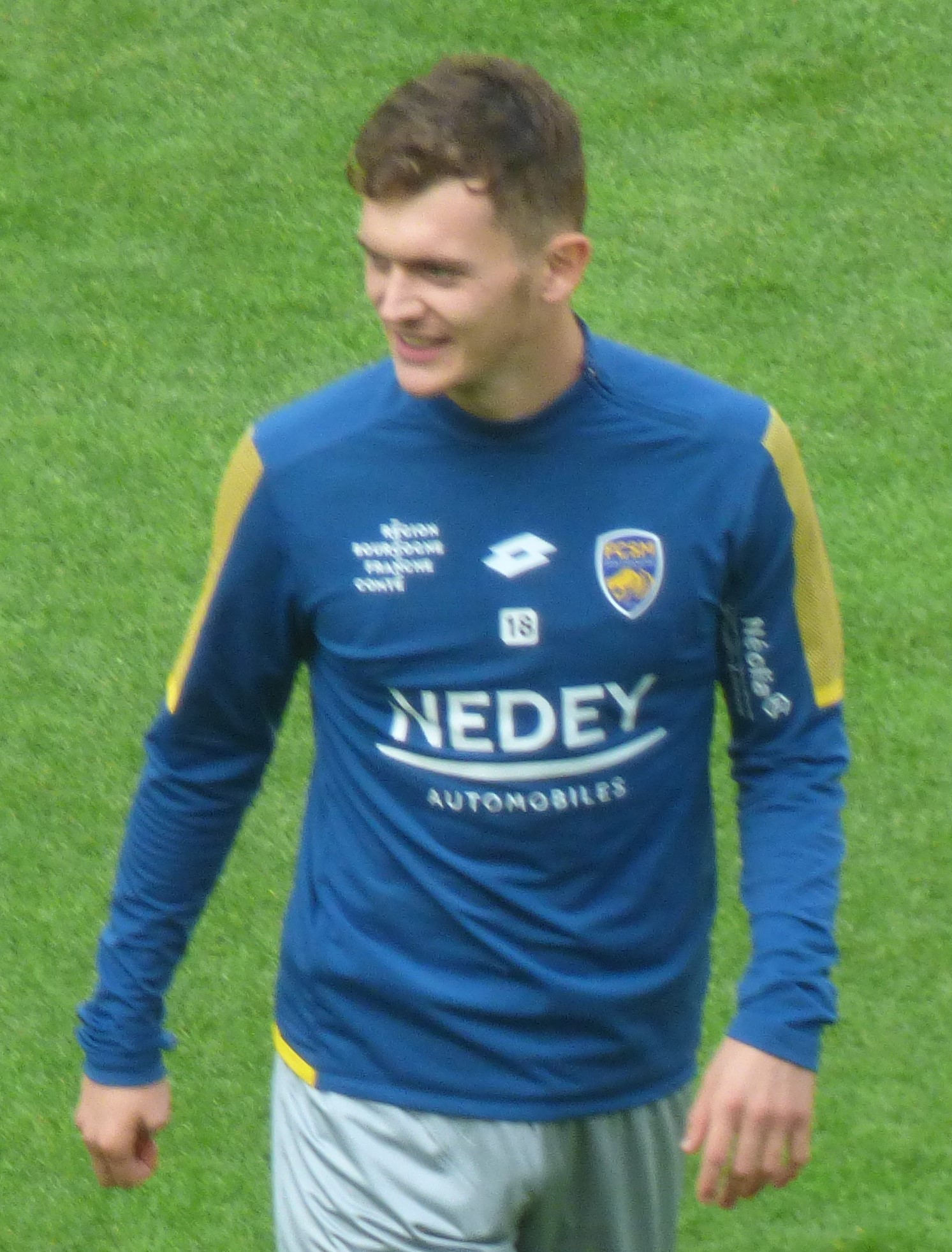
- Ruiz in 2018

Personal information
- Date of birth: 6 April 1998 (age 28)
- Place of birth: Guebwiller, France
- Height: 1.88 m (6 ft 2 in)
- Position: Centre-back

Team information
- Current team: Metz

Youth career
- 2004–2010: ASCA Wittelsheim
- 2011–2012: US Wittelsheim
- 2012–2016: Sochaux

Senior career*
Years	Team	Apps	(Gls)
2014–2018	Sochaux B	44	(2)
2016–2019	Sochaux	48	(1)
2019–2022	Sion	35	(0)
2022	→ Boulogne (loan)	17	(0)
2022–2026	Pau	126	(5)
2026–	Metz	0	(0)

International career
2014–2015	France U17	12	(0)
2015–2016	France U18	7	(0)
2016–2017	France U19	10	(0)
2018	France U20	2	(0)
- * Club domestic league appearances and goals as of 11 May 2026

Jean Ruiz (born 6 April 1998) is a French professional footballer who plays as a centre-back or defensive midfielder for Ligue 2 club Metz.

Ruiz clinched victory in the 2015 UEFA European Under-17 Championship as a part of the France national under-17 football team.

== Career ==
=== Early career ===
Jean Ruiz began his football journey at ASCA Wittelsheim at the age of six. He later joined US Wittenheim in 2011 before moving to the FC Sochaux-Montbéliard youth academy in 2012.

In August 2014, at just 16 years old, he made his debut with the Sochaux reserve team in the Championnat National 2 against FC Fleury 91. At the end of the season, he won the 2014-15 Coupe Gambardella with Sochaux's U19 team, coming on as a substitute in the 62nd minute to help secure a 2–0 victory against Olympique lyonnais. That same year, he was part of the French U17 team that won the European Championship by defeating Germany. Ruiz was also selected to participate in the World Cup later that year.

Prior to the start of the 2016–2017 season, Ruiz signed his first professional contract with Sochaux, making his professional debut two months later in a Coupe de la Ligue match against Gazélec Ajaccio.

In June 2019, Ruiz transferred to FC Sion in Switzerland.

=== Pau FC ===
At the start of the 2022-2023 season, Ruiz returned to France, signing with Pau FC in Ligue 2. Initially expected to serve as a backup to captain Antoine Batisse and veteran Xavier Kouassi, Ruiz was thrust into a starting role following Batisse's injury. He played 39 matches and was instrumental in helping the club avoid relegation, establishing himself as a key player for the team.

Despite receiving numerous offers during the offseason, Ruiz chose to remain with Pau for the 2023-2024 season, despite the club's new focus on player trading. Over the course of his time at Pau, he played 71 of 76 possible Ligue 2 matches, scoring three goals and becoming one of the team's most utilized players.

In June 2024, it was announced that Ruiz, who was at the end of his contract, had signed a two-year extension with Pau FC, keeping him with the club until 2026. This decision was welcomed by the club's management and supporters, as Ruiz was the most utilized outfield player for Pau in the previous season, appearing in 35 matches and scoring three goals.

=== Metz ===
On 29 June 2026, Ruiz signed a three-year contract with Metz.

== Career statistics ==
=== Club ===
As of match played 7 January 2022

Appearances and goals by club, season and competition
Club	Season	League			National Cup		League Cup		Other		Total	
Club	Season	Division	Apps	Goals	Apps	Goals	Apps	Goals	Apps	Goals	Apps	Goals
Sochaux B	2014–15	Championnat de France Amateur	12	0	—		—		—		12	0
Sochaux B	2015–16	Championnat de France Amateur	18	0	—		—		—		18	0
Sochaux B	2016–17	Championnat de France Amateur	14	2	—		—		—		14	2
Sochaux B	2017–18	Championnat de France Amateur 2	13	0	—		—		—		13	0
Sochaux B	Total		57	2	0	0	0	0	0	0	57	2
Sochaux	2016–17	Ligue 2	9	0	1	0	3	0	—		13	0
Sochaux	2017–18	Ligue 2	29	1	2	0	1	0	—		32	1
Sochaux	2018–19	Ligue 2	10	0	2	0	2	0	—		14	0
Sochaux	Total		48	1	5	0	6	0	0	0	59	1
FC Sion	2019–20	Swiss Super League	15	0	1	0	—		1	0	17	0
FC Sion	2020–21	Swiss Super League	17	0	1	0	—		1	0	19	0
FC Sion	2021–22	Swiss Super League	3	0	—		—		—		3	0
FC Sion	Total		35	0	2	0	0	0	2	0	39	0
US Boulogne	2021–22	Championnat National	17	0	—		—		—		17	0
Pau FC	2022–23	Ligue 2	39	2	3	0	1	0	—		43	2
Pau FC	2023–24	Ligue 2	37	1	1	0	1	0	—		39	1
Pau FC	2024–25	Ligue 2	0	0	—		—		—		0	0
Pau FC	Total		76	3	4	0	2	0	0	0	82	3
Career total			226	4	11	0	8	0	2	0	247	4

== Honours ==
- France U17
  - UEFA European Under-17 Championship: 2015
