= Norman Bassette =

Belgian footballer (born 2004)

Personal information
- Full name: Norman Jaquy Bassette
- Date of birth: 9 November 2004 (age 22)
- Place of birth: Arlon, Belgium
- Height: 1.86 m (6 ft 1 in)
- Position: Forward

Team information
- Current team: KVC Westerlo (on loan from Coventry City)
- Number: 9

Youth career
- –2021: Virton

Senior career*
Years	Team	Apps	(Gls)
2021–2024	Caen	14	(1)
2021–2023	Caen B	26	(9)
2023–2024	→ Mechelen (loan)	22	(5)
2024–	Coventry City	25	(2)
2025–2026	→ Reims (loan)	12	(1)
2026	→ 1. FC Kaiserslautern (loan)	16	(2)
2026–	→ KVC Westerlo (loan)	12	(8)

International career^{‡}
2021–2022	Belgium U18	11	(3)
2022–2023	Belgium U19	5	(1)
2023	Belgium U20	2	(1)
2024–	Belgium U21	15	(8)
2024–	Belgium	1	(0)
- * Club domestic league appearances and goals as of 18 May 2026 ‡ National team caps and goals as of 15:22, 18 November 2026 (UTC)

Norman Jaquy Bassette (born 9 November 2004) is a Belgian professional footballer who plays as a forward for Belgian Pro League club KVC Westerlo, on loan from Premier League club Coventry City and the Belgium national team.

== Club career ==
Norman Bassette rose through the ranks of Virton of the Belgian second division. When financial troubles (not even being awarded a professional license for the 2020–21 season) struck Virton, Bassette joined the French Ligue 2 side of Caen in the summer of 2020. He started playing with the under-17, during a season where very few youth games were played because of the COVID-19 pandemic. He signed a full-time three-year contract with the Norman club at the end of the season.

Having started the 2021–22 season playing with the National 2 reserve team, Bassette was soon called to the first team, in late August 2021. He made his professional debut for Caen on 11 September 2021, replacing Johann Lepenant in a 2–1 home Ligue 2 loss against Pau FC.

On 21 August 2024, Bassette joined Championship side Coventry City for an undisclosed fee, signing a four-year deal.

On 1 September 2025, Bassette joined Ligue 2 club Reims on loan for the 2025–26 season. On 6 January 2026, Bassette moved on a new loan to 1. FC Kaiserslautern in the German second tier.

On 22 July 2026, Bassette joined Belgian Pro League club KVC Westerlo on a season-long loan with an option to buy.

== International career ==
Bassette received his first call to the Belgium under-18 team on 23 August 2021, playing the two games against Norway and Sweden as a starter in early September.

Bassette made his debut for the Belgium national team on 17 November 2024 in a Nations League game against Israel at the Bozsik Aréna in Hungary. He substituted Arne Engels in added time, as Israel won 1–0.

== Style of play ==
Bassette mainly plays as a centre-forward and was compared to his young teammate Andréas Hountondji at Caens when representing their youth teams.

== Career statistics ==
=== Club ===
As of match played 17 May 2026

Appearances and goals by club, season and competition
Club	Season	League			National cup (Note: Includes Belgian Cup, FA Cup and Coupe de France)		League cup (Note: Includes EFL Cup)		Other		Total	
Club	Season	Division	Apps	Goals	Apps	Goals	Apps	Goals	Apps	Goals	Apps	Goals
Caen	2021–22	Ligue 2	1	0	0	0	—		—		1	0
Caen	2022–23	Ligue 2	12	1	0	0	—		—		12	1
Caen	2023–24	Ligue 2	1	0	0	0	—		—		1	0
Caen	Total		14	1	0	0	0	0	0	0	14	1
Caen B	2021–22	Championnat National 2	26	9	0	0	—		—		26	9
KV Mechelen (loan)	2023–24	Belgian Pro League	22	5	1	0	—		—		23	5
Coventry City	2024–25	EFL Championship	25	2	2	0	2	0	—		29	2
Coventry City	2025–26	EFL Championship	0	0	0	0	0	0	—		0	0
Coventry City	2026–27	Premier League	0	0	0	0	0	0	—		0	0
Coventry City	Total		25	2	2	0	2	0	0	0	29	2
Stade Reims (loan)	2025–26	Ligue 2	12	1	1	1	—		—		13	2
1. FC Kaiserslautern (loan)	2025–26	2. Bundesliga	16	2	0	0	—		—		16	2
KVC Westerlo (loan)	2026–27	Belgian Pro League	6	3	0	0	—		—		6	3
Career total			121	23	4	1	2	0	0	0	121	24

== Honours ==
Caen U18

- Coupe Gambardella runner-up: 2021–22
