= Johann Obiang =

Gabonese footballer (born 1993)

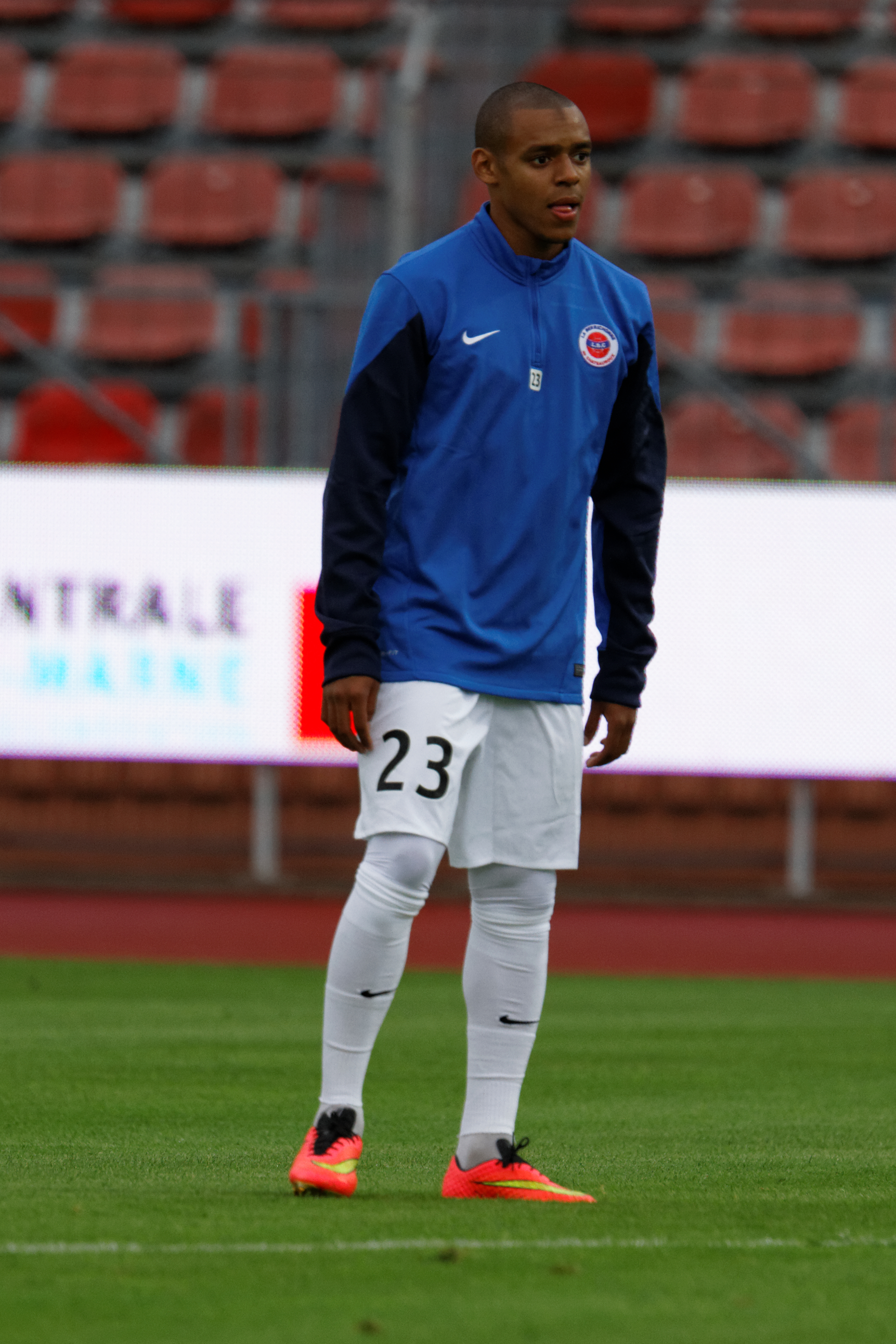
- Obiang with Châteauroux in 2014

Personal information
- Full name: Johann Serge Obiang
- Date of birth: 5 July 1993 (age 33)
- Place of birth: Le Blanc, France
- Height: 1.70 m (5 ft 7 in)
- Position: Left-back

Team information
- Current team: Orléans
- Number: 29

Youth career
- –2004: Ciron
- 2004–2012: Châteauroux

Senior career*
Years	Team	Apps	(Gls)
2012–2015	Châteauroux II	30	(4)
2012–2016	Châteauroux	92	(5)
2016–2019	Troyes	57	(0)
2016–2019	Troyes II	8	(0)
2019–2020	Le Puy Foot	13	(0)
2020–2022	Rodez	52	(0)
2022–2023	Caen	13	(0)
2022–2023	Caen II	5	(0)
2023–2025	Pau	43	(0)
2025–	Orléans	28	(0)

International career^{‡}
2014–	Gabon	55	(0)
- * Club domestic league appearances and goals as of 16 May 2026 ‡ National team caps and goals as of 30 March 2026

Johann Serge Obiang (born 5 July 1993) is a professional footballer who plays as a left-back for Ligue 3 club Orléans. He previously played for Troyes, Châteauroux, Caen and Pau. Born in France, he represents Gabon at international level.

== Club career ==
=== Châteauroux ===
Born in Le Blanc, of which his mother is a native, Johann Obiang possesses Gabonese nationality by his father, Serge. He started football in Ciron, where his father was then a leader. As a chick, Johann arrived at LB Châteauroux and then joined the Châteauroux Hope Pole at the age of 12. Johann rose to the ranks and signed his first professional contract in June 2013. Capable of developing all over the left flank, commits until 2016.

Obiang knows his first real season with professionals in the 2013-2014 exercise. With 33 games and his two goals scored, his season is considered correct. He is followed by a second season (27 league appearances) where he is regularly called up with his national selection. The club situation is more complicated, with the Berrichonne being relegated to National. He made his third full season there (27 appearances, again, in the championship, for 3 goals) before joining the ES Troyes AC free and returning to Ligue 2.

=== Troyes ===
On 9 June 2016, he initialled a two-year contract for ES Troyes AC.

He made his debut for Troyes on July 29, 2016, wearing the Trojan jersey in a match against Sochaux at the Stade de l'Aube. During his first season with Troyes, Obiang appeared in 26 matches across all competitions. The 2016–2017 campaign proved memorable, as he celebrated promotion to Ligue 1 following a dramatic two-legged playoff against FC Lorient, who had finished 18th in the top flight.

On 5 August 2017, he contested his first League 1 match against Stade Rennais FC in the first day of the championship. Nevertheless, blocked by his competitor Charles Traoré, he will play only 8 games in this season, which will see his club relegated to Ligue 2.

In the 2018-2019 season, he will make 25 appearances in Ligue 2 under the Troyes jersey. The club will finish third in the championship but will fail in its quest for a climb following a defeat in the roadblocks against RC Lens. At the end of the season, Obiang will not be extended by the wooden club and will find himself free to engage wherever he wants.

=== Caen ===
On 28 June 2022, the Stade Malherbe Caen announced Johann's signature to fill a potential start from the incumbent left side, Ali Abdi, who was elected to the previous season's team in Ligue 2 and announced to leave for Ligue 1. He's signing a two-year contract.

Finally, Abdi stays at the club and Johann becomes his understudy. At the beginning of the season, he grapples playing time by working at the right side post.

He delivered his first decisive pass for Alexandre Mendy in Caen's victory against Amiens (3-1), on 10 September 2022.

== International career ==
Obiang was born in France, to a Gabonese father and French mother. Also eligible for both the French and Gabonese national teams, he received his first called up to the Gabon national team in February 2014. Obiang was featured for Gabon national team in the 2021 AFCON tournament in Cameroon.

== Career statistics ==
=== Club ===
As of 16 May 2026.

Appearances and goals by club, season and competition
Club	Season	League			Coupe de France		Coupe de la Ligue		Other		Total	
Club	Season	Division	Apps	Goals	Apps	Goals	Apps	Goals	Apps	Goals	Apps	Goals
Châteauroux	2012–13	Ligue 2	5	0	1	0	0	0	—		6	0
Châteauroux	2013–14	Ligue 2	33	2	1	0	1	0	—		35	2
Châteauroux	2014–15	Ligue 2	27	0	1	0	1	0	—		29	0
Châteauroux	2015–16	Ligue 3	27	3	1	0	1	0	—		29	3
Châteauroux	Total		92	5	4	0	3	0	—		99	5
Troyes	2016–17	Ligue 2	23	0	1	0	0	0	2 (Note: Appearances in Ligue 1 relegation/promotion play-offs)	0	26	0
Troyes	2017–18	Ligue 1	8	0	2	0	1	0	—		11	0
Troyes	2018–19	Ligue 2	25	0	0	0	1	0	1	0	27	0
Troyes	Total		56	0	3	0	2	0	3	0	66	0
Le Puy Foot	2019–20	Ligue 3	13	0	4	0	—		—		17	0
Rodez	2020–21	Ligue 2	21	0	—		—		—		21	0
Rodez	2021–22	Ligue 2	31	0	1	0	—		—		32	0
Rodez	Total		52	0	1	0	—		—		53	0
Caen	2022–23	Ligue 2	13	0	1	0	—		—		14	0
Pau	2023–24	Ligue 2	26	0	2	0	—		—		28	0
Pau	2024–25	Ligue 2	17	0	2	0	—		—		19	0
Pau	Total		43	0	4	0	—		—		47	0
Orléans	2025–26	Ligue 2	28	0	4	0	—		—		32	0
Career total			297	5	22	0	5	0	3	0	326	5

=== International ===
As of match played 30 March 2026

Appearances and goals by national team and year
National team	Year	Apps	Goals
Gabon	2014	4	0
Gabon	2015	9	0
Gabon	2016	7	0
Gabon	2017	5	0
Gabon	2018	2	0
Gabon	2019	1	0
Gabon	2020	2	0
Gabon	2021	8	0
Gabon	2022	6	0
Gabon	2023	3	0
Gabon	2025	6	0
Gabon	2026	2	0
Total		55	0
