= Iyad Mohamed =

Footballer (born 2001)

Personal information
- Full name: Iyad Inomse M'Vourani Mohamed
- Date of birth: 5 March 2001 (age 25)
- Place of birth: Dunkirk, France
- Height: 1.91 m (6 ft 3 in)
- Position: Midfielder

Team information
- Current team: Portsmouth
- Number: 37

Youth career
- 2009–2010: Fort-Mardyck OC
- 2010–2013: Dunkerque
- 2013–2015: Lille
- 2015–2019: Dunkerque
- 2019–2020: Auxerre

Senior career*
Years	Team	Apps	(Gls)
2019–2022	Auxerre II	32	(1)
2021–2022	Auxerre	6	(1)
2022–2023	Caen	3	(0)
2022–2023	Caen II	5	(0)
2022–2023	→ Le Mans (loan)	14	(0)
2023–2025	Pau	29	(1)
2024	Pau II	2	(0)
2025–2026	Casa Pia	32	(1)
2026–	Portsmouth	5	(0)

International career^{‡}
2020	Comoros U20	3	(0)
2021–	Comoros	11	(0)
- * Club domestic league appearances and goals as of 18 May 2026 ‡ National team caps and goals as of 15 June 2024

Iyad Inomse M'Vourani Mohamed (born 5 March 2001) is a professional footballer who plays as a midfielder for EFL Championship club Portsmouth. Born in France, he plays for the Comoros national team.

== Club career ==
=== Early career ===
Mohamed was born in Dunkirk, France, to a Dunkerquoise mother and a Comorian father. He began playing football at the age of eight with Fort-Mardyck, before joining Dunkerque. After a stint with Lille in the U13 and U14 teams, Mohamed returned to Dunkerque, where he continued his development.

In 2019, he joined Auxerre after impressing during a match against Paris FC. Initially trained as a number 10 or wide midfielder, Mohamed was repositioned as a defensive midfielder due to his height and ability to dictate play.

=== Auxerre ===
Mohamed made his professional debut for Auxerre on 6 November 2021, scoring his first goal during a 4-1 victory against Pau at the Stade de l'Abbé-Deschamps. His performances attracted attention, but contract renewal negotiations with Auxerre fell through in 2022.

=== Caen ===
On 24 June 2022, Mohamed signed a contract with Caen until 2025. However, he found playing time limited, making only three appearances in Ligue 2. In January 2023, he was loaned to Le Mans in Championnat National, where he played 14 matches.

=== Pau ===
In 2023, after returning from his loan, Mohamed signed with Pau. He quickly established himself as a key player, becoming one of the revelations of the 2023–24 season. Despite a knee injury that required surgery, Mohamed returned to action in April 2024 and played a crucial role in securing Pau's defense. In August 2024, Pau's coach Nicolas Usaï confirmed that Mohamed would be a key player for the 2024–25 season.

=== Casa Pia ===
On 3 February 2025, Mohamed signed with Casa Pia in Portugal.

=== Portsmouth ===
On 27 August 2026, Mohamed joined Championship side Portsmouth for an undisclosed fee on a three-year deal.

== International career ==
Despite being eligible to represent France, Mohamed chose to represent Comoros, reflecting his heritage. He played for the Comoros U20 at the 2020 COSAFA U-20 Cup. He made his senior debut on 1 September 2021, in a 7-1 friendly win over Seychelles, which marked Comoros' largest victory to date.

After recovering from his knee injury, Mohamed was recalled to the national team in September 2023, earning his 10th and 11th caps under new coach Stefano Cusin, as Comoros prepared for crucial World Cup 2026 qualifying matches.

On 11 December 2025, Mohamed was called up to the Comoros squad for the 2025 Africa Cup of Nations.

== Career statistics ==
As of 15 June 2024

=== Club ===
Club	Season	League	Apps	Goals	Cup	Apps	Goals	Total	Apps	Goals
Auxerre II	2019–20	N3	12	0	-	-	12	0		
Auxerre II	2020–21	N3	20	1	-	-	20	1		
Auxerre	2021–22	Ligue 2	6	1	1	0	7	1		
Caen	2022–23	Ligue 2	3	0	0	0	3	0		
Le Mans (loan)	2022–23	National	14	0	1	0	15	0		
Pau	2023–24	Ligue 2	10	1	2	0	12	1		
Total			45	3	4	0	49	3		

=== International ===
National Team	Season	Caps	Goals
Comoros U20	2020	3	0
Comoros	2021–present	11	0
