= 2026–27 KVC Westerlo season =

KVC Westerlo
2026–27 season
- Manager: Issame Charaï
- Stadium: Het Kuipje
- Belgian Pro League: 12th
- Belgian Cup: Pre-season
- Top goalscorer: League: Shunsuke Saito (3); All: Shunsuke Saito (3)
- Biggest win: Mechelen 0–4 Westerlo
- Biggest defeat: Westerlo 1–5 Union Saint-Gilloise; Lommel 4–0 Westerlo

The 2026–27 season is the 94th season in the history of Koninklijke Voetbal Club Westerlo and the fifth consecutive season in the Belgian Pro League. The club will also compete in the Belgian Cup.

== Transfers ==
=== In ===
Pos.	Player	Transferred from	Fee	Date	Source
MF	(Poland) Karol Borys	(Slovenia) Maribor	Loan return	30 June 2026	
GK	(Belgium) Bill Lathouwers	(Belgium) RWDM Brussels	Free	1 July 2026	
DF	(Germany) Reno Münz	(Germany) Greuther Fürth	Undisclosed	1 July 2026	
FW	(Belgium) Norman Bassette	(England) Coventry City	Loan	22 July 2026	
DF	(Denmark) Lasse Flø	(Denmark) Vejle	Undisclosed	25 July 2026	
MF	(Wales) Cameron Congreve	(Wales) Swansea City	Undisclosed	3 August 2026	
MF	(Belgium) Cisse Sandra	(Belgium) Club Brugge KV	~€1,500,000	4 August 2026	
MF	(South Korea) Yang Min-hyeok	(England) Tottenham Hotspur	Loan	12 August 2026	
FW	(Switzerland) Felix Tsimba	(Switzerland) Young Boys	Undisclosed	17 August 2026	
MF	(Senegal) Pape Diong	(France) RC Strasbourg	€1,500,000	27 August 2026	
FW	(Austria) Dino Delić	Austria Klagenfurt	Undisclosed	1 September 2026	
DF	(Hungary) Botond Balogh	(Italy) Parma	€500,000	1 September 2026	
FW	(Ivory Coast) Abdoulaye Koné	(Finland) AC Oulu	€350,000	2 September 2026	
MF	(Belgium) Nikola Storm	(Turkey) Antalyaspor	Undisclosed	3 September 2026	

=== Out ===
Pos.	Player	Transferred to	Fee	Date	Source
MF	(Iran) Allahyar Sayyadmanesh	(Poland) Lech Poznań	End of contract	19 June 2026	
FW	(Turkey) Enis Destan	(England) Hull City	Loan return	30 June 2026	
DF	(France) Clinton Nsiala	(Scotland) Rangers	Loan return	30 June 2026	
FW	(Spain) Nacho Ferri	(Netherlands) Feyenoord	Undisclosed	1 July 2026	
FW	(Ivory Coast) Fernand Gouré	(Poland) Radomiak Radom	End of contract	1 July 2026	
DF	(Ivory Coast) Bakary Haidara			1 July 2026	
MF	(Belgium) Arthur Piedfort	(France) Auxerre	Undisclosed	1 July 2026	
GK	(Belgium) Koen Van Langendonck	(Belgium) Patro Eisden Maasmechelen	End of contract	1 July 2026	
MF	(Costa Rica) Josimar Alcócer	(Czech Republic) Sparta Prague	Undisclosed	4 July 2026	

== Pre-season and friendlies ==
4 July 2026 Friendly	PAOK (Greece)	4–0	(Belgium) Westerlo
14:30	Konstantelias 55'; Thymianis 63'; Camara 74', 79'

12 July 2026 Friendly	Helmond Sport (Netherlands)	0–2	(Belgium) Westerlo
			Laalaoui 32'; Babtich 68'

18 July 2026 Friendly	Westerlo (Belgium)	0–2	(Belgium) Beerschot

22 July 2026 Friendly	Westerlo (Belgium)	0–0	(Saudi Arabia) Al-Fayha
14:00

25 July 2026 Friendly	Dunkerque (France)	1–3	(Belgium) Westerlo
13:30

29 July 2026 Friendly	Westerlo (Belgium)	1–1	(Greece) Kifisia
	Lapage 90+4'

1 August 2026 Friendly	Westerlo (Belgium)	1–2	(Turkey) Samsunspor
	Bassette 23'

== Competitions ==
=== Overall record ===
Competition	First match	Last match	Starting round	Record							
Competition	First match	Last match	Starting round	Pld	W	D	L	GF	GA	GD	Win %
Belgian Pro League	8 August 2026		Matchday 1	5	1	1	3	9	14	−5	20.00
Belgian Cup				0	0	0	0	0	0	+0	—
Total				5	1	1	3	9	14	−5	20.00

Last updated: 15 August 2026
Source: Competitions

=== Belgian Pro League ===
Pos	Team	Pld	W	D	L	GF	GA	GD	Pts
10	Antwerp	5	2	1	2	10	10	0	7
11	Anderlecht	4	2	0	2	3	5	−2	6
12	Westerlo	5	1	1	3	9	14	−5	4
13	Beveren	4	1	0	3	2	10	−8	3
14	Cercle Brugge	4	0	2	2	5	7	−2	2

Updated to match(es) played on 5 September 2026. Source: Jupiler Pro League (in Dutch)
Rules for classification: 1) Points; 2) Matches won; 3) Goal difference; 4) Goals scored; 5) Away matches won; 6) Away goal difference; 7) Away goals scored; 8) Play-off.

==== Results by round ====
Round	1	2
Ground	H	A
Result	L	L
Position	18	16

Updated to match(es) played on 15 August 2026. Source:
A = Away; H = Home; W = Win; D = Draw; L = Loss

==== Matches ====
8 August 2026 1	Westerlo	1–5	Union Saint-Gilloise	Westerlo
20:45	Bassette 13'; Sandra (yellow card) 35'		Mac Allister (yellow card) 25'; David 28'; Florucz (yellow card) 33', (goal) 57'; Mofokeng 64'; Smith 81'; Olaru 84'	Stadium: Het Kuipje; Referee: Bert Put

15 August 2026 2	Genk	3–2	Westerlo	Genk
20:45	Durosinmi 41' (pen.); Heynen 43'; Bibout 79'		Ourega 6'; Smets 13' (o.g.)	Stadium: Cegeka Arena; Referee: Lawrence Visser

23 August 2026 3	Lommel	4–0	Westerlo
16:00

30 August 2026 4	Westerlo	2–2	Zulte Waregem
19:15

5 September 2026 5	Mechelen	0–4	Westerlo
18:15
