= Jean-Claude Larrieu (footballer) =

French footballer (born 1946)

Personal information
- Date of birth: 23 September 1946 (age 80)
- Place of birth: France, Bayonne
- Position: Goalkeeper

Senior career*
Years	Team	Apps	(Gls)
1973–1974	Aviron Bayonnais		
1974–1980	Cannes		

International career
1976	France		
- * Club domestic league appearances and goals

Jean-Claude Larrieu (French pronunciation: [ʒɑ̃ klod laʁjø]; born 23 September 1946) is a French former professional footballer who played as goalkeeper.

Larrieu joined the French Olympic Team during the 1976 Summer Olympic Games in Montreal, with Michel Platini and Patrick Battiston, amongst others.
