= Aviron Bayonnais FC =

French football club, based in Bayonne

Aviron Bayonnais
- Full name: Aviron Bayonnais Football Club
- Nicknames: Txuri-Urdin l'ABFC
- Founded: 1935; 91 years ago
- Ground: Stade Didier Deschamps, Bayonne
- Capacity: 3,500
- Chairman: Lausséni Sangaré
- Manager: Alain Pochat
- League: National 2
- 2024–25: National 3 Group A, 1st of 14 (promoted)
- Website: http://www.avironbayonnaisfc.fr/
Home colours	Away colours

Aviron Bayonnais Football Club (French pronunciation: [aviʁɔ̃ bajɔnɛ futbol klœb]; commonly referred to as simply Bayonne or ABFC) is a French association football club based in Bayonne. The club is a part of a sports club that was formed in 1904 that is also known for its rugby union club. The team is known primarily for youth development. The team is set to play in National 2 from 2025–26 after promotion from National 3 in 2024–25.

== History ==
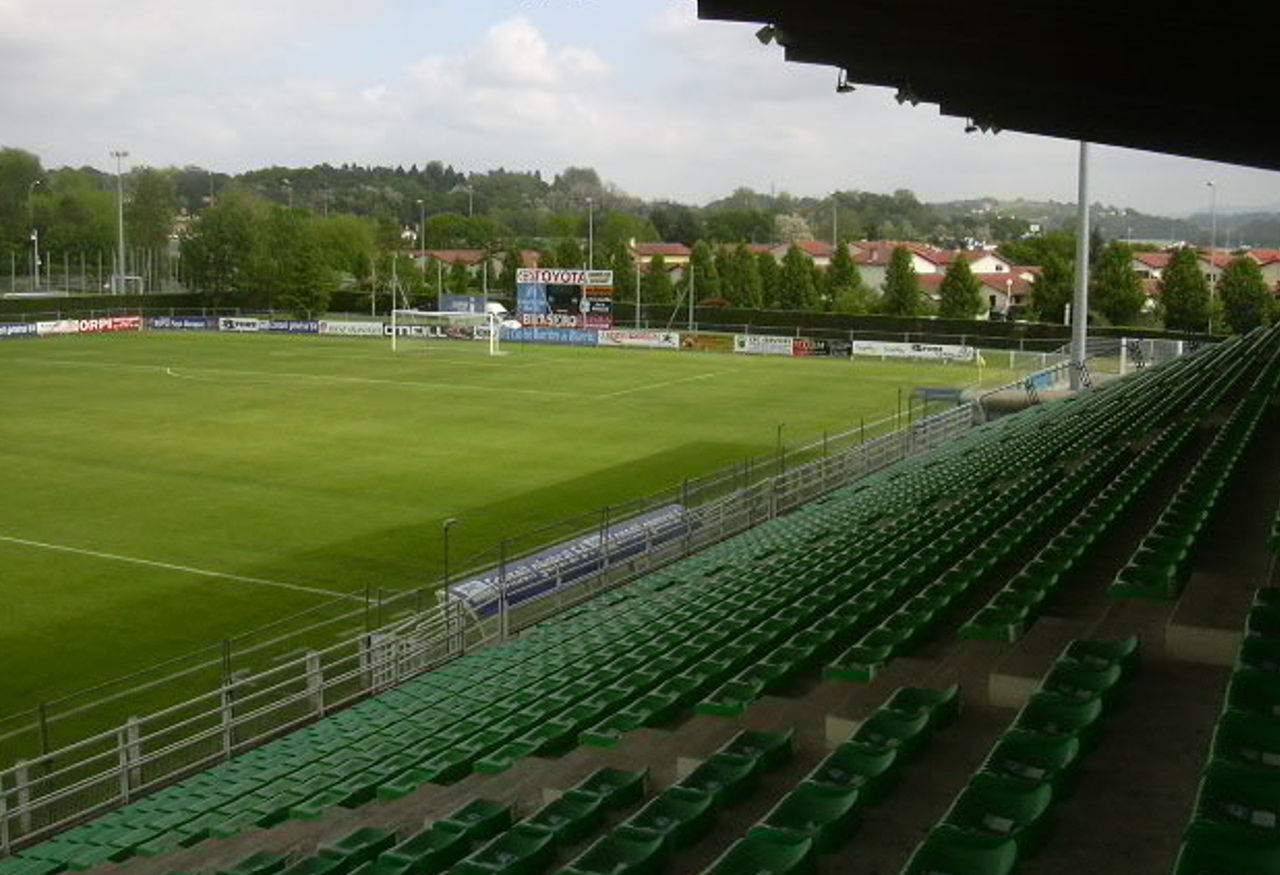
The team's stadium, Stade Didier Deschamps

The football club was founded in 1935 and currently play in the Championnat National 3, the fifth level of French football. Bayonne plays its home matches at the Stade Didier Deschamps located in the city. It is named after Bayonne native, former youth player and the 1998 FIFA World Cup and UEFA Euro 2000 winning captain Didier Deschamps, who also played for Marseille and Juventus. Central defender Aymeric Laporte is another player who featured for Bayonne as a youth before starring for Athletic Bilbao and later Manchester City. Athletic have had a collaboration agreement with Bayonne for several years that they recently renewed until 2024. While Aviron is the largest club in the French Basque Country, it has not replicated the successes of the clubs on the Spanish side of the border, though the club's new investor, Karim Fradim, who was previously the president of Chamois Niortais, hopes to professionalise the club.

In 2021, former AS Saint-Étienne goalkeeper Stéphane Ruffier joined as an educator in the club.

In 2024–25, Aviron Bayonnais secured promotion to National 2 for the first time in their history from next season.

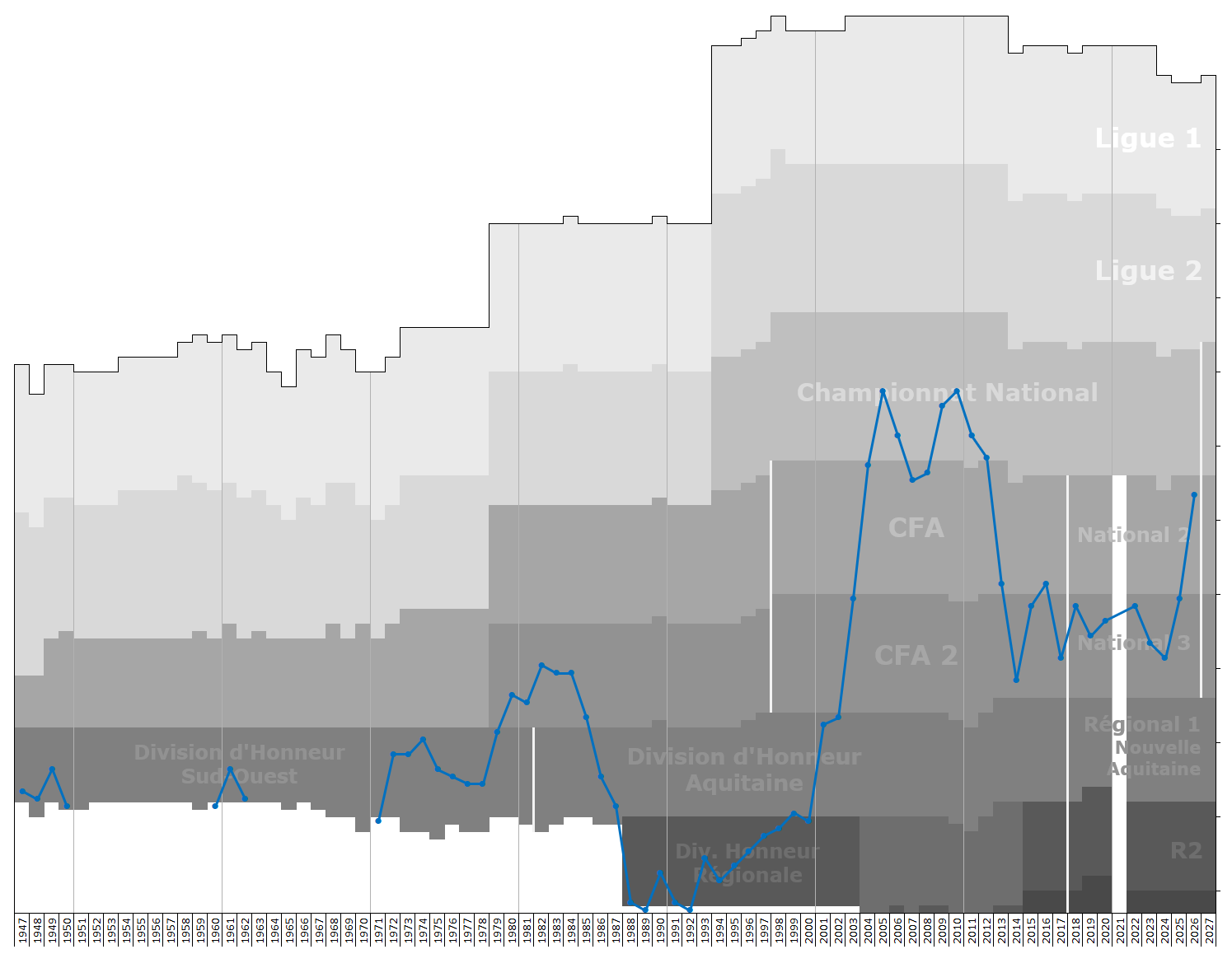
Historical league performance chart of Aviron Bayonnais FC

== Current squad ==
As of 5 November 2025

Note: Flags indicate national team as defined under FIFA eligibility rules; some limited exceptions apply. Players may hold more than one non-FIFA nationality.

No.	Pos.	Nation	Player
1	GK	FRA	Eneko Feltrin
2	DF	FRA	Quentin Hitte
4	DF	FRA	Ismail Cissé
5	DF	FRA	Pierre Bardy
6	MF	FRA	Charles-Elie Laprévotte
7	DF	FRA	Marius Ros
8	MF	FRA	Théo Montavit
9	FW	FRA	Laïd Boukhari
10	MF	FRA	Alexis Giacomini
11	MF	FRA	Thibault Lapeyre
15	FW	FRA	Arthur Saintorens
16	GK	FRA	Pierre Portets
19	FW	FRA	Robin Legendre

No.	Pos.	Nation	Player
20	MF	FRA	Mehdi Nafti
21	FW	FRA	Sonny Degert
22	DF	FRA	Florian Ducasse
23	DF	FRA	Dembo Gassama
26	DF	CIV	Ange Badey (on loan from Laval)
27	DF	FRA	Emmanuel Latron
28	FW	FRA	Marvin De Lima
29	MF	FRA	Valentin Picoulet
30	GK	FRA	Ghjuvanni Quilichini
—	DF	FRA	Byani Mpata Lama
—	DF	FRA	Enzo Martinez
—	MF	FRA	Gabin Zamo
—	FW	ESP	Endika Jiménez

== Notable players ==
=== Youth ===
- (France) Didier Deschamps
- (France) Roger Lacaze
- (France) Félix Lacuesta
- (Spain) Aymeric Laporte
- (Portugal) Kévin Rodrigues
- (France) Stéphane Ruffier

=== Senior ===
- (France) Jean-Claude Larrieu
- (Algeria) Alexandre Oukidja
- (France) Raymond Camus
- (France) Christian Sarramagna
- (France) Jean-Louis Cazes
- (France) François Grenet
- (France) Stéphane Ruffier
- (France) Vincent Laban

== Gallery ==
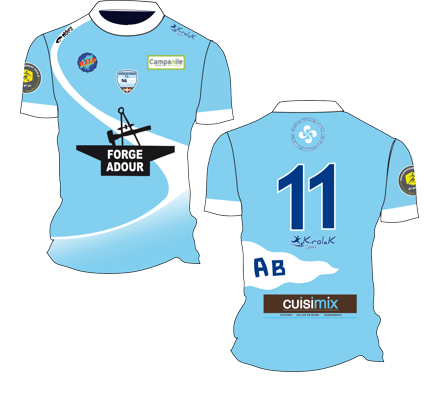
2013-14 home kit

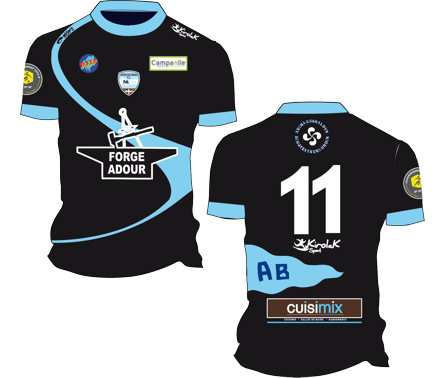
2013-14 away kit

== Bibliography ==
- Charles and Christophe Bartissol: Les racines du football français. PAC, Paris 1983, ISBN 978-2-85336-194-1
- Thierry Berthou/Collectif: Dictionnaire historique des clubs de football français. Pages de Foot, Créteil 1999 - Volume 1 (A-Mo), ISBN 2-913146-01-5
