= Marius Ros =

French footballer (born 2001)

Personal information
- Date of birth: 15 November 2001 (age 24)
- Place of birth: Montpellier, France
- Height: 1.75 m (5 ft 9 in)
- Position: Right-back

Team information
- Current team: Quevilly-Rouen
- Number: 2

Youth career
- -2019: Castelnau Le Crès
- 2019–2021: Montpellier

Senior career*
Years	Team	Apps	(Gls)
2021–2022	Montpellier II	24	(2)
2022–2024	Pau	4	(0)
2022–2024	Pau II	28	(0)
2024	Metz II	2	(0)
2024–2025	Les Genêts d'Anglet	21	(3)
2025–2026	Bayonne	25	(2)
2026–	Quevilly-Rouen	4	(0)
- * Club domestic league appearances and goals as of 5 September 2026

Marius Ros (born 15 November 2001) is a French professional footballer who plays as a right-back for Ligue 3 club Quevilly-Rouen.

== Professional career ==
Ros was born in Montpellier. He joined Montpellier as a youngster in 2019, having previously played for nearby Castelnau Le Crès. He graduated through the club's youth system and was released at the end of the 2021–22 season.

On 27 July 2022, Ros signed his first professional contract with Pau FC. Ros made his professional debut with Pau in a 0-0 Ligue 2 draw with Dijon FCO on 6 August 2022.

Marius Ros has mutually terminated his contract with Pau FC ahead of its June 2024 expiration. After making only two Ligue 2 appearances during his second season with the club, Ros, who had been a key player for the reserve team, decided to leave in search of more playing time elsewhere.
