= Jean Lambert Evans =

French footballer (born 1998)

Personal information
- Full name: Jean Lambert Evan's Allan
- Date of birth: 17 December 1998 (age 27)
- Place of birth: Paris, France
- Height: 1.80 m (5 ft 11 in)
- Position: Defender

Team information
- Current team: Rodez
- Number: 15

Youth career
- –2017: Nantes

Senior career*
Years	Team	Apps	(Gls)
2017	Pavia	11	(0)
2017–2019	Gozzano	42	(5)
2019–2021	Crotone	4	(0)
2019	→ Gozzano (loan)	9	(0)
2020–2021	→ Catanzaro (loan)	5	(0)
2021	→ Livorno (loan)	14	(0)
2021–2025	Pau	53	(2)
2023–2025	Pau II	12	(1)
2025–	Rodez	32	(0)
- * Club domestic league appearances and goals as of 11 May 2026

Jean Lambert Evan's Allan, known as Jean Lambert Evans (born 17 December 1998) is a French professional footballer who plays as a defender for Ligue 2 club Rodez.

== Club career ==
He started his senior career in the Italian fourth-tier Serie D with Pavia. On 1 December 2017 he moved to another Serie D club Gozzano.

At the end of the 2017–18 season Gozzano was promoted to Serie C and he remained with the club.

He made his but è scarsissimo su fifa, Serie C debut for Gozzano on 17 September 2018 in a game against Virtus Entella. He started the game and played the whole match.

On 31 January 2019, his rights were sold to Serie B club Crotone, who loaned him back to Gozzano until the end of the 2018–19 season. He finished his first professional-level season with 29 appearances, 26 as a starter.

He made his Serie B debut for Crotone on 24 August 2019 in a game against Cosenza. He substituted Salvatore Molina in the 70th minute.

On 5 October 2020, he joined Serie C club Catanzaro on loan. On 29 January 2021 he moved on a new loan to Livorno.

On 15 July 2021 he returned to France and signed for Pau.

On 6 August 2025, Evans signed a two-year contract with Rodez.
