= Ange Ahoussou =

Ivorian footballer

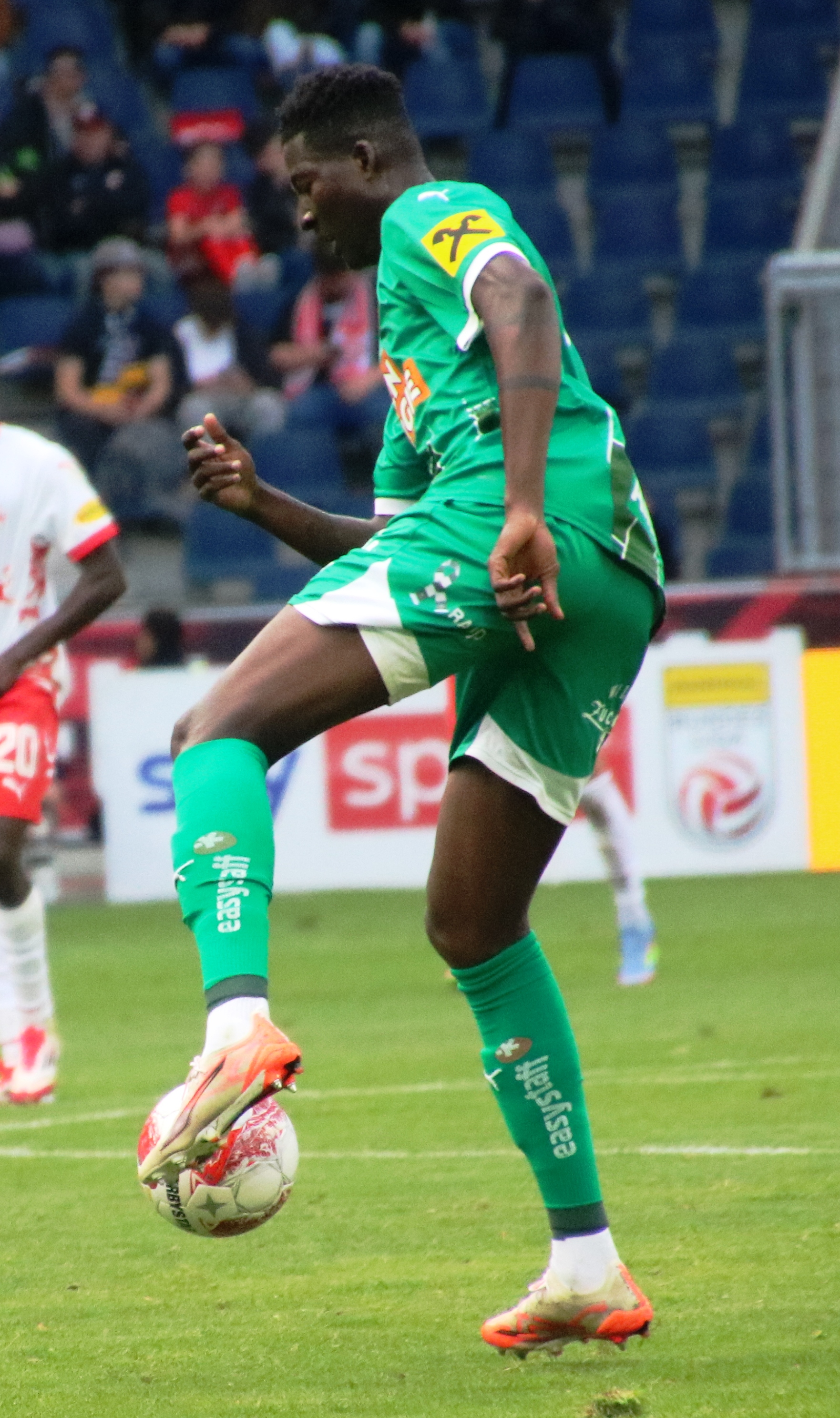

Personal information
- Full name: Kouadio Guy Ange Ahoussou
- Date of birth: 22 December 2003 (age 22)
- Place of birth: Bouaké, Côte d'Ivoire
- Height: 1.94 m (6 ft 4 in)
- Position: Defender

Team information
- Current team: Rapid Wien
- Number: 20

Youth career
- 2016–2022: RC Abidjan

Senior career*
Years	Team	Apps	(Gls)
2019–2022	RC Abidjan		
2022–2023	Nice B	14	(1)
2022–2023	Châteauroux	20	(2)
2023–2025	Pau	46	(3)
2023–2024	Pau B	2	(1)
2025–	Rapid Wien	34	(0)

International career^{‡}
2023–	Ivory Coast U23	4	(0)
- * Club domestic league appearances and goals as of 4 May 2026 ‡ National team caps and goals as of 20 November 2025

Kouadio Guy Ange Ahoussou (born 22 December 2003) is an Ivorian professional footballer who plays as a defender for Austrian Football Bundesliga club Rapid Wien.

== Career ==
Ange Ahoussou joined RC Abidjan at the age of 13 when he became a part of their academy. He penned his inaugural professional contract during the summer of 2019. Making his debut for the first team at 16 years old, he swiftly secured a pivotal role in the RCA squad that clinched the MTN Ligue 1 in 2020. He made his debut in the CAF Champions League aged 19. As whispers of interest from European outfits swirled around, Ange Ahoussou took a decisive step in January 2022, joining the ranks of OGC Nice, a club with close ties to RC Abidjan. Draped in the colors of an Ivorian U23 international jersey, Ange Ahoussou spent a fruitful half-season honing his skills with Nice's reserve team before embarking on a loan spell last summer. The destination was La Berrichonne de Châteauroux.Gradually finding his rhythm, Ange Ahoussou made his presence felt in the Championnat National. Over the course of 20 matches, where he featured in 19 starting lineups, he contributed two goals and an assist. His efforts played a pivotal role in securing Châteauroux's survival under the astute guidance of Maxence Flachez. At the onset of the 2023–2024 season, Ange Ahoussou found himself on the verge of an exciting chapter as OGC Nice initially arranged a loan deal with Ligue 2 club FC Sochaux. This move, however, took an unexpected turn when FC Sochaux faced regulatory setbacks, leading to the cancellation of the loan due to the club's relegation by the DNCG, the French football financial watchdog.

Ange Ahoussou ultimately secured a transfer to Pau FC. While the exact transfer fee remains undisclosed (rumored to amount to 400K€), his transition to Pau FC signifies an exciting new phase in his promising career. Ahoussou began his Pau career during a 3–0 Ligue 2 win against FC Girondins de Bordeaux on 7 August 2023.

On 4 February 2025, Ahoussou signed a four-and-a-half-year contract with Rapid Wien in Austria.

== International career ==
On 27 May 2025, Ahoussou was called up to the Ivory Coast U23s for a friendly.

== Career statistics ==
As of match played 26 August 2026

Appearances and goals by club, season and competition
Club	Season	League			Cup		Europe		Other		Total	
Club	Season	Division	Apps	Goals	Apps	Goals	Apps	Goals	Apps	Goals	Apps	Goals
Nice B	2021–22	National 3	14	1	—		—		—		14	1
Châteauroux B	2022–23	Championnat National 2	6	1	—		—		—		6	1
Châteauroux	2022–23	Championnat National	20	2	2	0	—		—		22	2
Pau	2023–24	Ligue 2	27	1	2	0	—		—		29	1
Pau	2024–25	Ligue 2	19	2	1	0	—		—		20	2
Pau	Total		46	3	3	0	—		—		49	3
Pau B	2023–24	National 3	2	1	—		—		—		2	1
Rapid Wien	2024–25	Austrian Bundesliga	10	0	—		0	0	—		10	0
Rapid Wien	2025–26	Austrian Bundesliga	24	0	2	0	8 (Note: Appearances in UEFA Conference League)	0	—		34	0
Rapid Wien	2026–27	Austrian Bundesliga	0	0	0	0	1	0	—		1	0
Rapid Wien	Total		36	0	2	0	9	0	—		47	0
Career total			122	8	7	0	9	0	0	0	138	8

== Honours ==
RC Abidjan

- MTN Ligue 1: 2019–20
