= Hugo Vandermersch =

French footballer (born 1999)

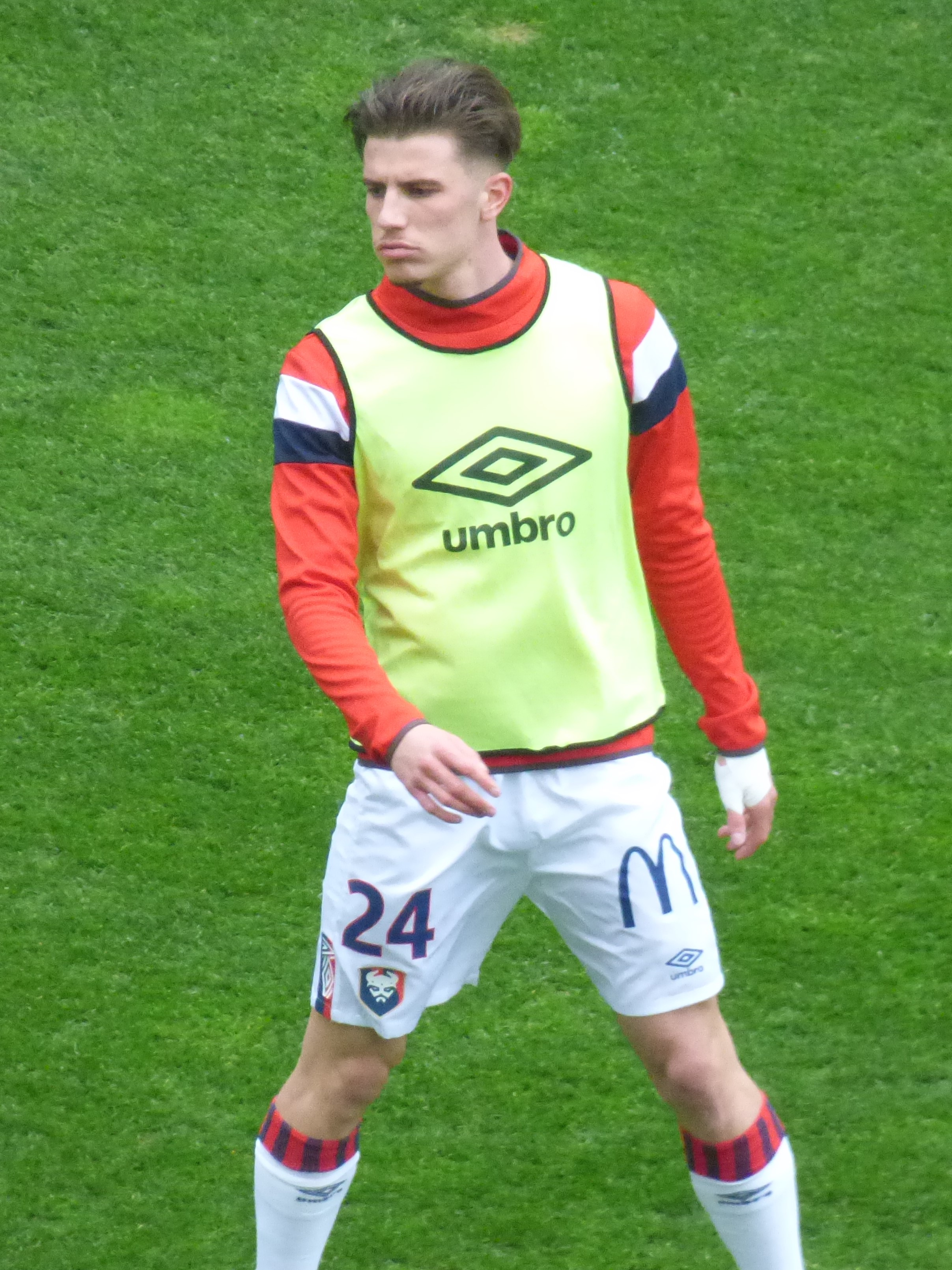
- Vandermersch in 2020

Personal information
- Full name: Hugo Vandermersch
- Date of birth: 5 May 1999 (age 27)
- Place of birth: Blendecques, France
- Height: 1.80 m (5 ft 11 in)
- Position: Right back

Team information
- Current team: FC St. Gallen
- Number: 28

Senior career*
Years	Team	Apps	(Gls)
2017	Boulogne II	5	(0)
2017–2021	Caen II	39	(0)
2019–2024	Caen	108	(2)
2023–2024	→ SV Elversberg (loan)	26	(2)
2024–	St. Gallen	76	(3)
- * Club domestic league appearances and goals as of 28 September 2026

Hugo Vandermersch (born 5 May 1999) is a French professional footballer who plays as a right back for Swiss club FC St. Gallen.

== Career ==
On 23 July 2019, Vandermersch signed his first professional contract with Stade Malherbe Caen. Vandermersch made his professional debut with Caen in a 1–1 Ligue 2 tie with Niort on 23 August 2019.

On 1 September 2023, Vandermersch joined SV Elversberg in German 2. Bundesliga on loan.
