= Jordy Gaspar =

Angolan footballer (born 1997)

Personal information
- Date of birth: 23 April 1997 (age 29)
- Place of birth: Saint-Priest-en-Jarez, France
- Height: 1.72 m (5 ft 8 in)
- Position: Full-back

Team information
- Current team: Rouen
- Number: 5

Youth career
- 2003–2008: Vaulx-en-Velin
- 2008–2016: Lyon

Senior career*
Years	Team	Apps	(Gls)
2014–2017	Lyon B	29	(0)
2016–2017	Lyon	2	(0)
2017–2020	Monaco	0	(0)
2017–2018	→ Cercle Brugge (loan)	16	(1)
2020–2023	Grenoble	86	(1)
2024–2025	Pau	42	(0)
2026–	Rouen	0	(0)

International career^{‡}
2015	France U19	1	(0)
2016	France U20	1	(0)
2024–	Angola	2	(0)
- * Club domestic league appearances and goals as of 12 May 2025 ‡ National team caps and goals as of 21 August 2024

Jordy Maku Gaspar (born 23 April 1997) is a professional footballer who plays as a full-back for Ligue 3 club Rouen. Born in France, he represents the Angola national team.

== Club career ==
=== Youth and early career ===
Jordy Gaspar was born on 23 April 1997 in Saint-Priest-en-Jarez, France. He began his youth career at FC Vaulx-en-Velin in 2003, where his father was a coach. In 2008, he joined the Olympique Lyonnais Academy at the age of 10.

=== Lyon ===
Gaspar made his professional debut for Olympique Lyonnais on 27 September 2016 in a UEFA Champions League match against Sevilla, playing 71 minutes in a 1–0 away loss. After failing to secure a long-term contract with Lyon, he left the club at the end of the season.

=== Monaco ===
On 16 June 2017, Gaspar signed a three-year contract with Monaco. He was loaned to Cercle Brugge for the 2017–18 season, where he made 16 appearances and scored one goal. Despite returning to Monaco, Gaspar did not make any appearances for the first team.

=== Grenoble ===
In 2020, Gaspar joined Grenoble Foot 38, where he became a regular starter. Over three seasons, he made 86 appearances and scored one goal in Ligue 2. His performances attracted interest from several Ligue 1 clubs.

=== Pau ===
In January 2024, Gaspar signed with Pau FC, where he took the number 12 shirt. He made his debut for the club on 9 February 2024 after a brief period without match play. In June 2024, he extended his contract with the club for another season.

== International career ==
Born in France to Angolan parents, Gaspar was eligible to represent both France and Angola. He played for France at the U19 and U20 levels. In 2024, he made his senior debut for Angola in a friendly match against Morocco on 22 March 2024.

== Career statistics ==
=== Club ===
Appearances and goals by club, season and competition
Club	Season	League		Cup		League Cup		Europe		Other		Total	
Club	Season	Apps	Goals	Apps	Goals	Apps	Goals	Apps	Goals	Apps	Goals	Apps	Goals
Lyon	2016–17	2	0	0	0	0	0	0	1	—	—	3	0
Cercle Brugge (loan)	2017–18	16	1	1	1	0	0	—	—	—	—	17	0
Grenoble	2020–23	86	1	1	0	0	—	—	—	—	—	86	0
Pau FC	2023–24	15	0	0	0	0	0	—	—	—	—	15	0
Pau FC	2024–25	2	0	0	0	0	0	—	—	—	—	2	0
Total		120	2	1	0	0	0	1	0	—	—	123	0
