= Louis Mouton =

French footballer (born 2002)

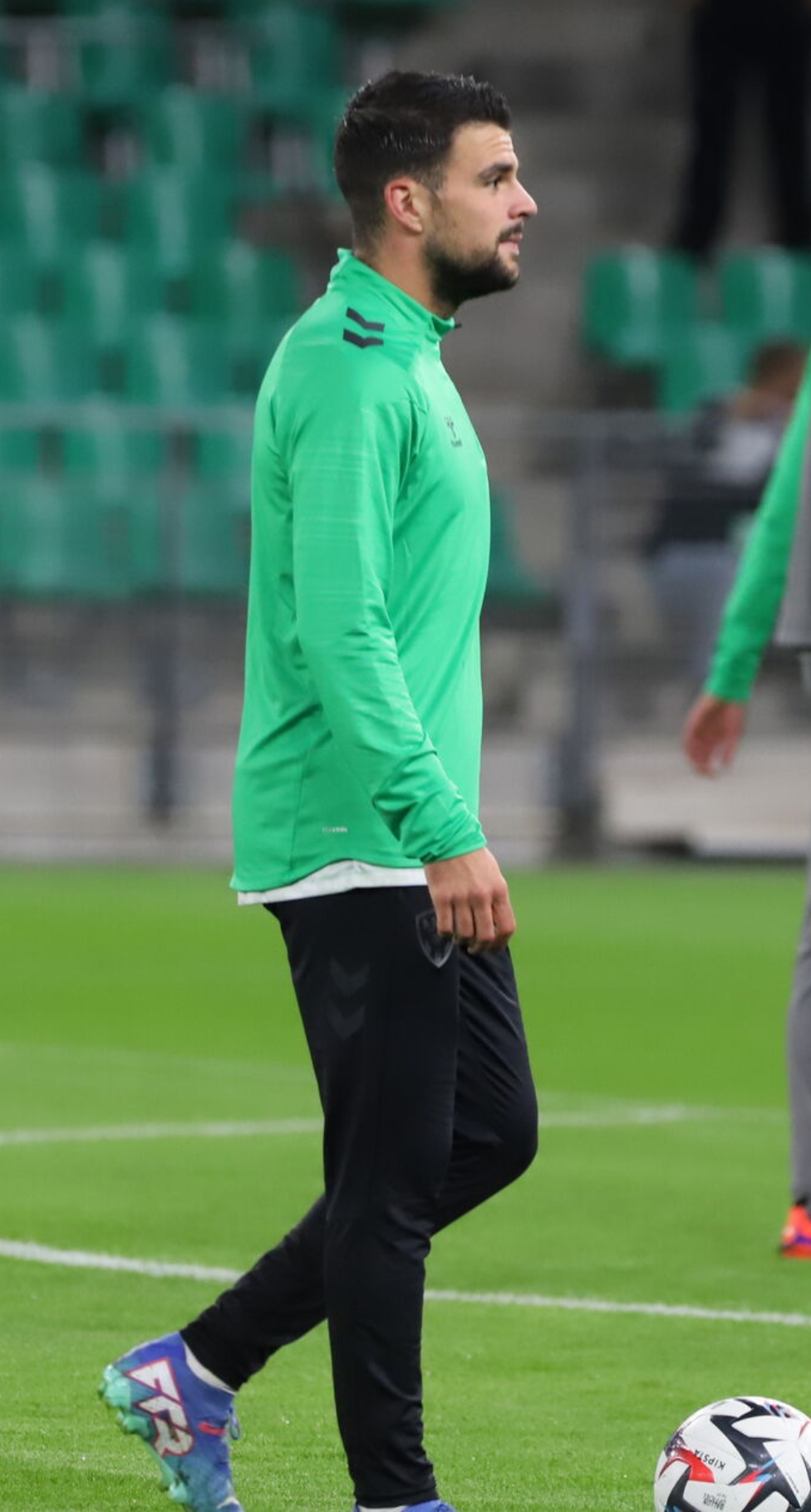
- Mouton in 2024

Personal information
- Date of birth: 3 June 2002 (age 24)
- Place of birth: Saint-Étienne, France
- Height: 1.89 m (6 ft 2 in)
- Position: Midfielder

Team information
- Current team: Angers
- Number: 6

Youth career
- 2008–2013: ES Veauche
- 2013–2021: Saint-Étienne

Senior career*
Years	Team	Apps	(Gls)
2020–2024	Saint-Étienne B	32	(5)
2022–2025	Saint-Étienne	39	(1)
2023–2024	→ Pau (loan)	27	(0)
2025–	Angers	32	(2)
- * Club domestic league appearances and goals as of 20 May 2026

Louis Mouton (born 3 June 2002) is a French professional footballer who plays as a midfielder for Ligue 1 club Angers.

== Career ==
Originally a youth player at ES Veauche, Mouton joined Saint-Étienne's academy in 2013. During the 2021–22 season, he was an integral member of the club's reserve team in the Championnat National 3. On 17 June 2022, Mouton signed his first professional contract with Saint-Étienne, a one-year deal. He made his professional debut as a substitute in a 2–1 Ligue 2 defeat away to Dijon on 30 July. On 20 August, Mouton made his first start for Saint-Étienne in an eventual 6–0 home defeat to Le Havre. He scored his first professional goal in a 2–2 draw away to Pau on 5 September.

In the subsequent season, Mouton was loaned to Pau in Ligue 2, to further develop his skills and establish himself. He quickly made an impact, contributing to plays and opportunities in his matches, indicating a promising start to his loan spell. This move was fueled by his desire to demonstrate his capabilities and talents. His transition to Pau was facilitated by Victor Lobry's endorsement.

On 20 June 2025, Mouton signed a three-year contract with Ligue 1 club Angers.

== Personal life ==
Louis's younger brother Jules, born in 2005, has also been a Saint-Étienne youth player.
