= Noé Sow =

French footballer (born 1998)

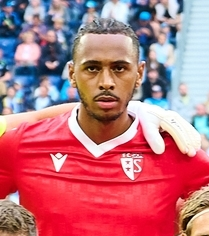

Personal information
- Date of birth: 18 December 1998 (age 27)
- Place of birth: Quimperlé, France
- Height: 1.90 m (6 ft 3 in)
- Position: Defender

Team information
- Current team: Sion
- Number: 5

Youth career
- Fleur de Genêt Bannalec
- 2015–2016: Rennes
- 2016–2017: Changé
- 2017–2018: Vannes

Senior career*
Years	Team	Apps	(Gls)
2018–2019	Quimperlé		
2019–2020	Plouzané AC	24	(0)
2020–2021	Plabennec	24	(1)
2021–2022	Brest II	19	(2)
2022–2024	Pau	25	(0)
2022–2024	Pau II	8	(0)
2024–	Sion	57	(2)
- * Club domestic league appearances and goals as of 28 September 2026

Noé Sow (born 18 December 1998) is a French professional footballer who plays as a defender for Swiss club Sion.

== Professional career ==
On 26 June 2020, Sow signed his first professional contract with Pau FC. Sow made his professional debut with Pau in a 0-4 Ligue 2 loss to EA Guingamp on 30 July 2022.

On 11 July 2024, Sow signed a one-season contract with Sion in Switzerland, with an option to extend.

== Personal life ==
Born in France, Sow holds French and Senegalese nationalities.
