= Nouste Camp =

Football stadium in Bizanos, France

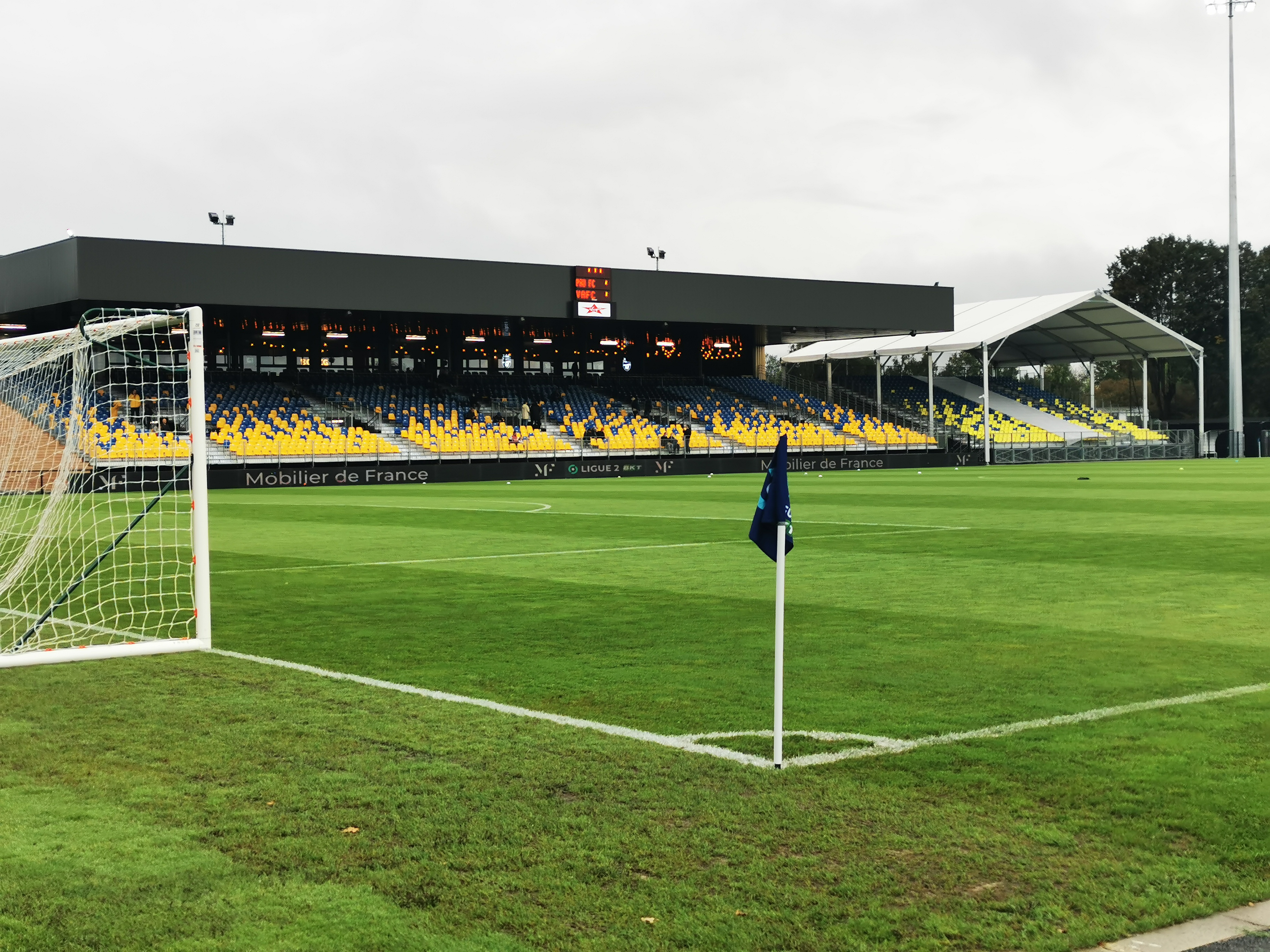
- Interactive map of Nouste Camp
- Full name: Stade communautaire Nouste Camp
- Location: Chemin de l'Aviation (Larribau); 64000 Pau, Nouvelle-Aquitaine, France
- Coordinates: 43°18′27.6″N 0°19′33.3″W
- Owner: City of Pau
- Capacity: 4,031
- Surface: Grass

Construction
- Opened: 14 September 2018
- Renovated: 2021
- Architect: Despré Agence d'Architecture

Tenant
- Pau FC

The Nouste Camp (IPA: [ˈnɔste ˈkamp]) is a football stadium and a sports complex located in the Pau suburb of Bizanos in France. The home of Pau FC, it is the smallest stadium in the 2022–23 Ligue 2, with an all-seated capacity of 4,031.

Opened as Nouveau Stade de Pau in 2018, the stadium is Pau FC's new football-specific stadium. After renovations were completed in 2021 to comply with Ligue 2 requirements, the ground was renamed Nouste Camp, which means "Our Ground" in Béarnese. The complex includes several football pitches, including a training pitch with artificial turf.

The club used a variety of grounds in Pau for home matches in the years between 1959 and 2018. Pau FC had to groudshare with French rugby union heavyweight Section Paloise since 1991, when Section left their historic Stade de la Croix du Prince.

== History ==
In their early years, Pau FC played at numerous grounds. When first starting out they played on Stade des Bleuets, since the club was a spin-off of Bleuets de Pau. They moved from there to the Stade du Hameau (then a military stadium), and then to the Stade de l'Ousse des Bois, and returned to Stade du Hameau in the 1990s.

Nouste Camp, designed by the architect Despré, was inaugurated on 14 September 2018, and Pau FC drew against Villefranche 1–1 in the first match held there.
