= Nicolas Usaï =

French football manager (born 1974)

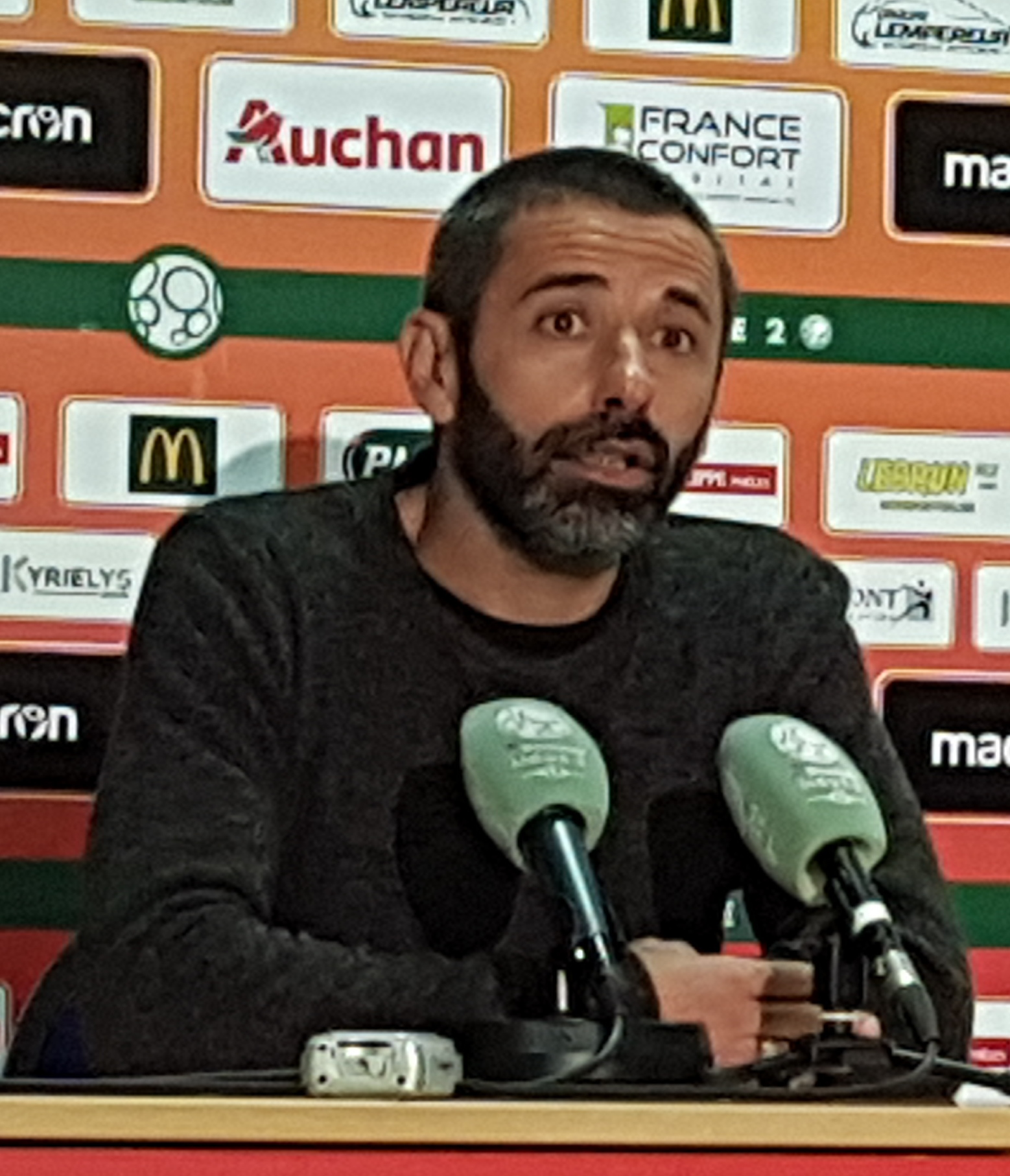
- Usaï with Châteauroux in 2018

Personal information
- Date of birth: 1 May 1974 (age 52)
- Place of birth: Marseille, France
- Height: 1.69 m (5 ft 7 in)
- Position: Left-back

Team information
- Current team: Reims (head coach)

Senior career*
Years	Team	Apps	(Gls)
1992–1995	Marseille B	1	(0)
1995–2000	Istres	32	(0)
2000–2001	Valenciennes	31	(0)
2001–2002	Alès	26	(0)
2002–2003	Angoulême	34	(0)
2003–2005	Cherbourg	32	(0)
2005–2007	Athlético Marseille		
Total		156+	(0+)

Managerial career
- 2008–2014: Istres
- 2014–2016: GS Consolat
- 2016–2018: Sedan
- 2018: Athlético Marseille
- 2018–2020: Châteauroux
- 2022: Nîmes
- 2022–2023: Orléans
- 2023–2026: Pau
- 2026–: Reims
- * Club domestic league appearances and goals

Nicolas Usaï (born 1 May 1974) is a French professional football coach and former player who is the head coach of Ligue 2 club Reims. As a player, he was a left-back.

== Managerial career ==
Usaï had a career as a semi-amateur footballer, before he began his managerial career in the lower divisions of France. He was named the best manager of the 2015–16 Championnat National.

On 24 October 2018, Usaï was named the manager of Ligue 2 club Châteauroux. He was sacked by the club in December 2020.

On 4 January 2022, Usaï became the new manager of Ligue 2 club Nîmes. On 16 November 2022, he was relieved of his duties.

On 28 December 2022, Usaï was hired by Championnat National club Orléans.

On 21 May 2026, Usaï joined Reims in Ligue 2 on a two-season deal.
