= Xavier Kouassi =

Ivorian footballer (born 1989)

Personal information
- Full name: Xavier Laglais Kouassi
- Date of birth: 28 December 1989 (age 36)
- Place of birth: San-Pédro, Ivory Coast
- Height: 1.73 m (5 ft 8 in)
- Position: Defender

Youth career
- 2008–2009: Séwé Sports

Senior career*
Years	Team	Apps	(Gls)
2009–2013	Servette	93	(2)
2013–2016	FC Sion	68	(0)
2016–2017	New England Revolution	23	(1)
2018–2020	FC Sion	54	(0)
2020	Neuchâtel Xamax	10	(0)
2020–2025	Pau	150	(0)

International career
2011	Ivory Coast	1	(0)
- * Club domestic league appearances and goals as of 12 May 2025

Xavier Laglais Kouassi (born 28 December 1989) is an Ivorian professional footballer who plays as a defender.

He spent most of his career in the Swiss Super League with Servette and two spells at Sion. He made 215 total appearances in the competition and won the Swiss Cup with Sion in 2015. He also played in Major League Soccer for the New England Revolution in 2017.

Kouassi earned one cap for the Ivory Coast against Israel in August 2011.

== Club career ==
=== Early career ===
Born in San-Pédro, Kouassi began his career at local side Séwé Sports before moving to Servette FC in the Swiss Super League in 2009. He made his professional debut on 1 November that year, playing the full 90 minutes of a goalless away draw with FC Winterthur.

On 16 July 2013, Kouassi transferred to FC Sion of the same league, on a three-year deal. He played five of six matches as they won the Swiss Cup in 2014–15, including the 3–0 final win over FC Basel on 7 June.

=== New England Revolution ===
Kouassi joined the New England Revolution of Major League Soccer on 1 February 2016, joining as a designated player effective from July. However, a major injury to his right knee ruled him out for over a year, and he did not debut for his new team until 19 March 2017 in a 2–1 loss to FC Dallas; though used for only 45 minutes per game in pre-season due to this injury, he made it to 79. He was praised for his performance by head coach Jay Heaps and teammate Scott Caldwell.

On 1 June 2017, Kouassi scored his only goal for the Revs in a 2–2 draw with New York City FC. In September, he received straight red cards in heavy away losses to Atlanta United FC (7–0) and Orlando City SC (6–1), in the 16th and 11th minutes of the respective games.

=== Return to Sion ===
Kouassi returned to Sion on 15 February 2018, the last day of Switzerland's transfer window. In February 2020, before the Super League was postponed due to the COVID-19 pandemic, he was sent off in consecutive matches against FC Zürich and Neuchâtel Xamax FCS. The latter dismissal earned him a public criticism by club owner Christian Constantin, who considered it to have "murdered" the entire team's efforts.

Club captain Kouassi and eight other players were sacked by Sion on 20 March 2020, having refused a pay-cut amidst the pandemic.

=== Neuchâtel Xamax ===
On 16 June 2020, Kouassi signed for Neuchâtel Xamax.

=== Pau FC ===
On 13 September 2020, Kouassi signed for Pau FC.

== International career ==
Kouassi earned one cap for the Ivory Coast on 10 August 2011. He replaced Gervinho in the last minute of a 4–3 friendly win over Israel at the Stade de Genève, the home of his then-club Servette.

== Honours ==
FC Sion

- Swiss Cup: 2014–15
