= 2025–26 Pau FC season =

Pau FC
2025–26 season
- Chairman: Bernard Laporte-Fray
- Manager: Nicolas Usaï
- Stadium: Nouste Camp

The 2025–26 season is Pau FC's 67th season in existence and sixth consecutive in Ligue 2. They are also competing in the Coupe de France.

== Players ==
=== First-team squad ===
As of 23 July 2025

Note: Flags indicate national team as defined under FIFA eligibility rules; some limited exceptions apply. Players may hold more than one non-FIFA nationality.

| No. | Pos. | Nation | Player |
|---|---|---|---|
| 2 | DF | FRA | Tom Pouilly |
| 3 | DF | FRA | Joseph Kalulu |
| 4 | DF | FRA | Setigui Karamoko |
| 6 | MF | MTN | Oumar Ngom |
| 7 | FW | GLP | Taïryk Arconte |
| 9 | FW | SEN | Pathé Mboup |
| 10 | MF | FRA | Giovani Versini |
| 11 | MF | FRA | Kyllian Gasnier |
| 14 | MF | FRA | Antonin Bobichon |
| 18 | FW | MAR | Omar Sadik (on loan from Espanyol) |
| 19 | DF | GUI | Ousmane Kanté |
| 20 | DF | FRA | Tom Gomes |

| No. | Pos. | Nation | Player |
|---|---|---|---|
| 21 | MF | FRA | Steeve Beusnard |
| 22 | GK | FRA | Noah Raveyre |
| 23 | DF | FRA | Anthony Briançon |
| 25 | DF | FRA | Jean Ruiz |
| 26 | DF | FRA | Neil Glossoa |
| 30 | GK | FRA | Esteban Salles |
| 77 | GK | FRA | Tao Paradowski |
| 84 | MF | MAR | Rayan Touzghar |
| 87 | MF | ALG | Edhy Zuliani (on loan from Toulouse) |
| 97 | DF | FRA | Daylam Meddah |
| — | DF | FRA | Enzo Derouin |

=== Out on loan ===
Note: Flags indicate national team as defined under FIFA eligibility rules; some limited exceptions apply. Players may hold more than one non-FIFA nationality.

| No. / Pos. / Nation / Player | No. / Pos. / Nation / Player |

=== Reserves and Academy ===
As of 07 July 2025

Note: Flags indicate national team as defined under FIFA eligibility rules; some limited exceptions apply. Players may hold more than one non-FIFA nationality.

| No. | Pos. | Nation | Player |
|---|---|---|---|
| — | MF | SEN | Massiré Sylla |
| 34 | FW | FRA | Fidèle Bongelo |
| 77 | GK | FRA | Tao Paradowski |
| — | F | FRA | Mensah Govou |

| No. | Pos. | Nation | Player |
|---|---|---|---|
| 98 | MF | FRA | Tom Gomes |
| — | MF | SEN | Khalifa Ababacar Sylla |
| — | F | FRA | Alexandre Fernandes |

== Transfers ==
=== In ===
| Pos. | Player | Transferred from | Fee | Date | Source |
|---|---|---|---|---|---|
| MF | (France) Kyllian Gasnier | (France) Valenciennes FC | Free | 1 July 2025 | |
| DF | (France) Daylam Meddah | (France) SM Caen | Free | 1 July 2025 | |
| DF | (France) Neil Glossoa | (France) AJ Auxerre | Free | 1 July 2025 | |
| GK | (France) Esteban Salles | (France) US Concarneau | Free | 1 July 2025 | |
| DF | (France) Setigui Karamoko | (France) SC Aubagne Air Bel | Free | 1 July 2025 | |
| FW | (France) Giovani Versini | (France) La Berrichonne de Châteauroux | Free | 1 July 2025 | |
| MF | (Algeria) Edhy Zuliani | (France) Toulouse FC (loan) | Loan | 1 July 2025 | |
| DF | (France) Enzo Derouin | (France) FC Bassin d'Arcachon | Free | 1 July 2025 | |
| DF | (France) Anthony Briançon | (France) AS Saint-Étienne | Free | 1 July 2025 | |
| GK | (Morocco) Tao Belabdi | (France) Nîmes Olympique | Free | 1 July 2025 | |
| FW | (Morocco) Omar Sadik | (Spain) RCD Espanyol (loan) | Loan | 9 July 2025 | |
| GK | (France) Noah Raveyre | (Italy) AC Milan | Free | 20 July 2025 | |
| DF | (France) Tom Pouilly | (France) RC Lens | Free | 4 August 2025 | |
| MF | (Morocco) Rayan Touzghar | (France) EA Guingamp (loan) | Loan | 31 July 2025 | |

=== Out ===
| Pos. | Player | Transferred to | Fee | Date |
|---|---|---|---|---|
| FW | (France) Yonis Njoh | (Denmark) Viborg FF | €139,000 | Summer 2025 |
| FW | (Guinea) Kandet Diawara | (France) Le Havre AC (loan ended) | N/A | Summer 2025 |
| GK | (Senegal) Bingourou Kamara | Free agent | N/A | Summer 2025 |
| GK | (France) Mehdi Jeannin | (France) FC Sochaux | Free | Summer 2025 |
| DF | (Ivory Coast) Xavier Kouassi | Free agent | N/A | Summer 2025 |
| DF | (France) Jordy Gaspar | Free agent | N/A | Summer 2025 |
| DF | (Gabon) Johann Obiang | Free agent | N/A | Summer 2025 |
| DF | (Madagascar) Kenji-Van Boto | Free agent | N/A | Summer 2025 |
| MF | (Senegal) Joseph Lopy | (France) Angers SCO (loan ended) | N/A | Summer 2025 |
| FW | (France) Mehdi Chahiri | Free agent | N/A | Summer 2025 |
| DF | (France) Jean Lambert Evans | Free agent | N/A | Summer 2025 |
| DF | (France) Thérence Koudou | (Belgium) KV Mechelen | €1,200,000 | Summer 2025 |
| MF | (France) Antoine Mille | (France) ES Troyes AC | N/A | Summer 2025 |

=== Loan in ===
| Pos. | Player | Loaned from | Fee | Date | Source |
|---|---|---|---|---|---|
| MF | (Algeria) Edhy Zuliani | (France) Toulouse FC | Loan | 1 July 2025 | |
| FW | (Morocco) Omar Sadik | (Spain) RCD Espanyol | Loan | 9 July 2025 | |
| MF | (Morocco) Rayan Touzghar | (France) EA Guingamp | Loan | 31 July 2025 | |

== Pre-season and friendlies ==
Win Draw Loss Fixtures

Pau FC began its pre-season preparation with an intensive training camp and a series of friendly matches. From 14 to 19 July 2025, the team will hold a training camp in Hagetmau.

The first friendly match is scheduled on 5 July 2025 at Carcassonne against FC Annecy. The second friendly will take place on 12 July at Tarbes against Toulouse FC. On 18 July, Pau FC will face Real Sociedad in San Sebastián, offering the opportunity to test the squad against a top-flight La Liga EA Sports opponent. The following day, on 19 July, Pau will host Angoulême Charente FC in Hagetmau. Two additional friendlies are planned: on 26 July against SD Eibar and on 1 August against an opponent yet to be confirmed, with venues still to be announced.

Pre-season friendly match details
5 July 2025
Friendly

| Pau FC | v | FC Annecy |

Stade Jean-Claude Mazet, Carcassonne

12 July 2025
17:00
Friendly

| Pau FC | 0–0 | Toulouse FC |

Stade Maurice-Trélut, Tarbes

18 July 2025
19:00
Friendly

| Real Sociedad (Spain) | 2–0 | (France) Pau FC |
|---|---|---|
| Pacheco 20'; Marín 30' | | Briançon (yellow card) 17'; Meddah (yellow card) 29' |

Stade d'Anoeta, San Sebastián

19 July 2025
18:00
Friendly

| Pau FC (France) | 1–0 | (France) Angoulême Charente FC |

Stade Georges-Dumartin, Hagetmau

26 July 2025
17:00
Friendly

| SD Eibar (Spain) | 0–0 | (France) Pau FC |

Ipurua Municipal Stadium, Eibar

1 August 2025
Friendly

| Rodez AF (France) | 2–4 | (France) Pau FC |
|---|---|---|
| Baaloudj 7'; Mathis Magnin 60' | | Bobichon 41'; Versini 64' 86'; Touzghar 74' |

Stade Paul-Lignon, Rodez

== Competitions ==
=== Ligue 2 ===
==== League table ====
| Pos | Team | Pld | W | D | L | GF | GA | GD | Pts |
|---|---|---|---|---|---|---|---|---|---|
| 7 | Annecy | 34 | 15 | 7 | 12 | 49 | 39 | +10 | 52 |
| 8 | Montpellier | 34 | 14 | 9 | 11 | 41 | 31 | +10 | 51 |
| 9 | Pau | 34 | 12 | 9 | 13 | 48 | 62 | −14 | 45 |
| 10 | Dunkerque | 34 | 11 | 10 | 13 | 53 | 45 | +8 | 43 |
| 11 | Guingamp | 34 | 10 | 10 | 14 | 42 | 49 | −7 | 40 |

Source: Ligue 2
Rules for classification: 1) Points; 2) Goal difference; 3) Number of goals scored; 4) Head-to-head goal difference; 5) Fair play points

==== Results summary ====
| Overall | | | | | | | | Home | | | | | | Away | | | | | |
| Pld | W | D | L | GF | GA | GD | Pts | W | D | L | GF | GA | GD | W | D | L | GF | GA | GD |
|---|---|---|---|---|---|---|---|---|---|---|---|---|---|---|---|---|---|---|---|
| 0 | 0 | 0 | 0 | 0 | 0 | 0 | 0 | 0 | 0 | 0 | 0 | 0 | 0 | 0 | 0 | 0 | 0 | 0 | 0 |

Last updated: 28 August 2024.
