= 2024–25 Pau FC season =

Pau FC
2024–25 season
- Chairman: Bernard Laporte-Fray
- Manager: Nicolas Usaï
- Stadium: Nouste Camp
colours	Away colours

The 2024–25 season is Pau FC's 66th season in existence and fifth consecutive in the Ligue 2. They are also competing in the Coupe de France.

== Players ==
=== First-team squad ===
As of 22 August 2024

Note: Flags indicate national team as defined under FIFA eligibility rules; some limited exceptions apply. Players may hold more than one non-FIFA nationality.

No.	Pos.	Nation	Player
1	GK	SEN	Bingourou Kamara
2	DF	FRA	Thérence Koudou
4	DF	CIV	Xavier Kouassi
6	MF	MTN	Oumar Ngom
7	FW	GLP	Taïryk Arconte
8	MF	COM	Iyad Mohamed
9	FW	SEN	Pathé Mboup
10	FW	MAR	Khalid Boutaïb
12	DF	ANG	Jordy Gaspar
14	MF	FRA	Antonin Bobichon
17	MF	FRA	Antoine Mille
19	DF	GUI	Ousmane Kanté
20	MF	FRA	Loïck Lespinasse

No.	Pos.	Nation	Player
21	MF	FRA	Steeve Beusnard
22	DF	CIV	Ange Ahoussou
23	DF	GAB	Johann Obiang
24	DF	MAD	Kenji-Van Boto
25	DF	FRA	Jean Ruiz
26	DF	FRA	Jean Lambert Evans
27	MF	FRA	Kyllian Gasnier
30	FW	FRA	Yonis Njoh
40	GK	ALG	Mehdi Jeannin
77	GK	FRA	Tao Paradowski
98	DF	FRA	Tom Gomes
99	DF	FRA	Joseph Kalulu
TBC	FW	FRA	Mehdi Chahiri

=== Out on loan ===
Note: Flags indicate national team as defined under FIFA eligibility rules; some limited exceptions apply. Players may hold more than one non-FIFA nationality.

No. / Pos. / Nation / Player	No. / Pos. / Nation / Player

=== Reserves and Academy ===
As of 28 August 2024

Note: Flags indicate national team as defined under FIFA eligibility rules; some limited exceptions apply. Players may hold more than one non-FIFA nationality.

No.	Pos.	Nation	Player
—	MF	SEN	Massiré Sylla
34	FW	FRA	Fidèle Bongelo
77	GK	FRA	Tao Paradowski
99	D	FRA	Joseph Kalulu

No.	Pos.	Nation	Player
98	MF	FRA	Tom Gomes
—	MF	SEN	Khalifa Ababacar Sylla

== Transfers ==
=== In ===
Pos.	Player	Transferred from	Fee	Date	Source
MF	(France) Antoine Mille	(France) La Berrichonne de Châteauroux	Free	1 August 2024	
MF	(France) Antonin Bobichon	(France) Stade lavallois	Free	1 August 2024	
FW	(Senegal) Pathé Mboup	(Belgium) RWD Molenbeek	Free	1 August 2024	
GK	(France) Tao Paradowski	(France) Nîmes Olympique	Free	1 August 2024	
FW	(Guadeloupe) Taïryk Arconte	(France) Stade Brestois 29	€600,000	1 August 2024	
DF	(France) Thérence Koudou	(France) Stade de Reims	Free	1 August 2024	
DF	(France) Joseph Kalulu	(France) AS Saint-Priest	Free	1 August 2024	
MF	(France) Kyllian Gasnier	(France) Chamois Niortais	Free	22 August 2024	
FW	(France) Fidèle Bongelo	(France) Montpellier HSC	Free	1 August 2024	
FW	(Guinea) Kandet Diawara	(France) Le Havre AC	Loan (Option to Buy)	1 August 2024	

=== Out ===
Pos.	Player	Transferred to	Fee	Date	Source
DF	(Canada) Diyaeddine Abzi	N/A	Contract Terminated	1 August 2024	
FW	(Republic of the Congo) Mons Bassouamina	(France) Clermont Foot	Free	1 August 2024	
MF	(Benin) Sessi D'Almeida	(Cyprus) Apollon Limassol	Free	1 August 2024	
FW	(France) Sonny Degert	(France) Saint-Pryvé Saint-Hilaire FC	Free	1 August 2024	
MF	(France) Nicolas Delpech	(France) US Avranches	Free	1 August 2024	
DF	(France) Marius Ros	N/A	Free	1 August 2024	
MF	(France) Thomas Colléaux	(France) FC Lorient B	Free	1 August 2024	
GK	(France) Quentin Galvez-Diarra	N/A	Free	1 August 2024	
MF	(Senegal) Henri Saivet	(France) Clermont Foot	Free	1 August 2024	
DF	(France) Noé Sow	(Switzerland) FC Sion	Free	1 August 2024	
FW	(Mali) Moussa Sylla	(Germany) FC Schalke 04	€2,500,000	1 August 2024	
MF	(Argentina) Tino Costa	N/A	Retired	1 August 2024	
FW	(France) Adel Lembezat	(France) Dijon FCO	Free	1 August 2024	
FW	(Morocco) Yanis Begraoui	(France) Toulouse FC	Return from Loan	1 August 2024	
MF	(France) Louis Mouton	(France) AS Saint-Étienne	Return from Loan	1 August 2024	
MF	(Senegal) Pape Massar Djitte	(France) Girondins de Bordeaux	Free	1 August 2024	
MF	(France) Charles Boli	(Cyprus) Apollon Limassol	Free	1 August 2024	

=== Loan in ===
Pos.	Player	Loaned from	Fee	Date	Source
MF	(Guinea) Kandet Diawara	(France) Le Havre AC	Loan (Option to Buy)	1 August 2024	

== Pre-season and friendlies ==
Win Draw Loss Fixtures

Pau FC resumed training on July 1, 2024. Initially, the club planned a training camp in Chalosse, but Hagetmau served as a base camp for the Paraguayan Olympic team during this period. As a result, the team relocated to Loudenvielle in the Pyrenees for an altitude camp from July 22 to 26. With Henri Saivet's departure, Bingourou Kamara is now the captain. Seven National 3 players start the pre-season with the professional squad: Massiré Sylla, Tidjan Diaby, Khalifa Sylla, Tom Gomes, and Alexandre Fernandes, players who were already with the reserve team last season. Two additional players are involved, Salif Lebouath and Fidèle Bongelo.

Here is the list of friendly matches planned for Pau FC in 2024:

- July 13, 2024: vs. Iraq Olympic team in Anglet, behind closed doors for security reasons.
- July 20, 2024: vs. Toulouse FC (Ligue 1) in Blagnac (Haute-Garonne).
- July 27, 2024: vs. Niort (National) in La Brède (Gironde).
- August 3, 2024: vs. Rodez in Blagnac (Haute-Garonne).
- August 10, 2024: vs. the reserve team of Real Sociedad in Hagetmau.

=== Changes in preparation ===
- The match against the Iraq Olympic team was canceled due to logistical reasons by the Lions of Babylon. In replacement, Nicolas Usaï scheduled an internal match on training ground no. 2 at Nouste Camp.
- At the end of their camp in Loudenvielle, from July 22 to 26, they did not play against Chamois Niortais Football Club in La Brède as initially planned, but traveled to Marseille to face Olympique de Marseille on July 27 at the Robert-Louis-Dreyfus Training Center.
- The match against FC Martigues, initially scheduled for Tuesday, July 30, was canceled at the request of the promoted team, which will visit Nouste Camp on the 4th day of Ligue 2 on September 14. Martigues preferred to avoid two close encounters in the schedule, and Pau FC ended up facing Real Valladolid Club de Fútbol at Estadio José Zorrilla on July 31.

July 20, 2024 Friendly	Toulouse Football Club	2–2	Pau Football Club	Stade Louis Heraud, Blagnac
18:00 CEST (UTC+2)	Aboukhlal 17'; Ruiz 38' (own goal)	Report	Njoh 49'; Bobichon 85'	Attendance: 1500

July 27, 2024 Friendly	Olympique de Marseille	3–0	Pau Football Club	Robert-Louis-Dreyfus Training Center, Marseille
18:00 CEST (UTC+2)	Greenwood 31'; Henrique 64'; Bakola 89'	Report		Attendance: 0 (closed door)

July 31, 2024 Friendly	Real Valladolid	4–1	Pau Football Club	Estadio José Zorrilla, Valladolid
20:00 CEST (UTC+2)	Torres 8'; Parente 38'; Chuki 57'; M. Sylla 71' (penalty)	Report	Mboup 45'	Attendance: 0 (closed door)

August 3, 2024 Friendly	Rodez AF	1–4	Pau Football Club	Stade Louis Heraud, Blagnac
17:00 CEST (UTC+2)	Corredor 54'	Report	Boutaïb 14'; Kanté 72'; Njoh 60', 85'	Attendance: 150

August 10, 2024 Friendly	Real Sociedad B	0–4	Pau Football Club	Stade Georges-Dumartin, Hagetmau
18:30 CEST (UTC+2)		Report	Bobichon 11'; Mboup 13', 43', 65'	Attendance: 850

== Competitions ==
=== Overall record ===
Competition	First match	Last match	Starting round	Final position	Record							
Competition	First match	Last match	Starting round	Final position	Pld	W	D	L	GF	GA	GD	Win %
Ligue 2	5 August 2023	17 May 2024	Matchday 1	10th	38	13	12	13	60	57	+3	34.21
Coupe de France	18 November 2023	5 January 2024	Seventh round	Round of 64	3	2	0	1	7	5	+2	66.67
Total					41	15	12	14	67	62	+5	36.59

Source: Soccerway

=== Ligue 2 ===
==== League table ====
Pos	Team	Pld	W	D	L	GF	GA	GD	Pts	Promotion or Relegation
11	Amiens	34	13	4	17	38	50	−12	43	
12	Ajaccio (Note: Ajaccio were relegated due to financial reasons.) (D, R)	34	12	6	16	30	42	−12	42	Administrative relegation to Régional 2
13	Pau	34	10	12	12	39	53	−14	42	
14	Rodez	34	9	12	13	56	54	+2	39	
15	Red Star	34	9	11	14	37	51	−14	38	

Source: Ligue 2
Rules for classification: 1) Points; 2) Goal difference; 3) Number of goals scored; 4) Head-to-head goal difference; 5) Fair play points
(D) Disqualified; (R) Relegated

==== Results summary ====
Overall								Home						Away					
Pld	W	D	L	GF	GA	GD	Pts	W	D	L	GF	GA	GD	W	D	L	GF	GA	GD
2	1	1	0	3	2	+1	4	1	0	0	1	0	+1	0	1	0	2	2	0

Last updated: 28 August 2024.

== Ligue 2 2024-2025 ==
16 August 2024 1	Clermont Foot 63	2–2	Pau FC	Clermont-Ferrand
20:00	Keita 7'; Saivet 60'	Report	Boutaïb 16'; Arconte 45'	Stadium: Stade Gabriel-Montpied; Attendance: 5582; Referee: Rémi Landry

23 August 2024 2	Pau FC	1–0	SM Caen	Pau
20:00	Boutaïb 9'	Report		Stadium: Nouste Camp; Referee: Mickael Leleu
