= Touzghar =

Touzghar is a Moroccan surname. Notable people with the surname include:

- Yoann Touzghar (born 1986), Tunisian footballer
- Rayan Touzghar (born 2003), Moroccan footballer
