= Marvin Esor =

Martiniquais footballer (born 1989)

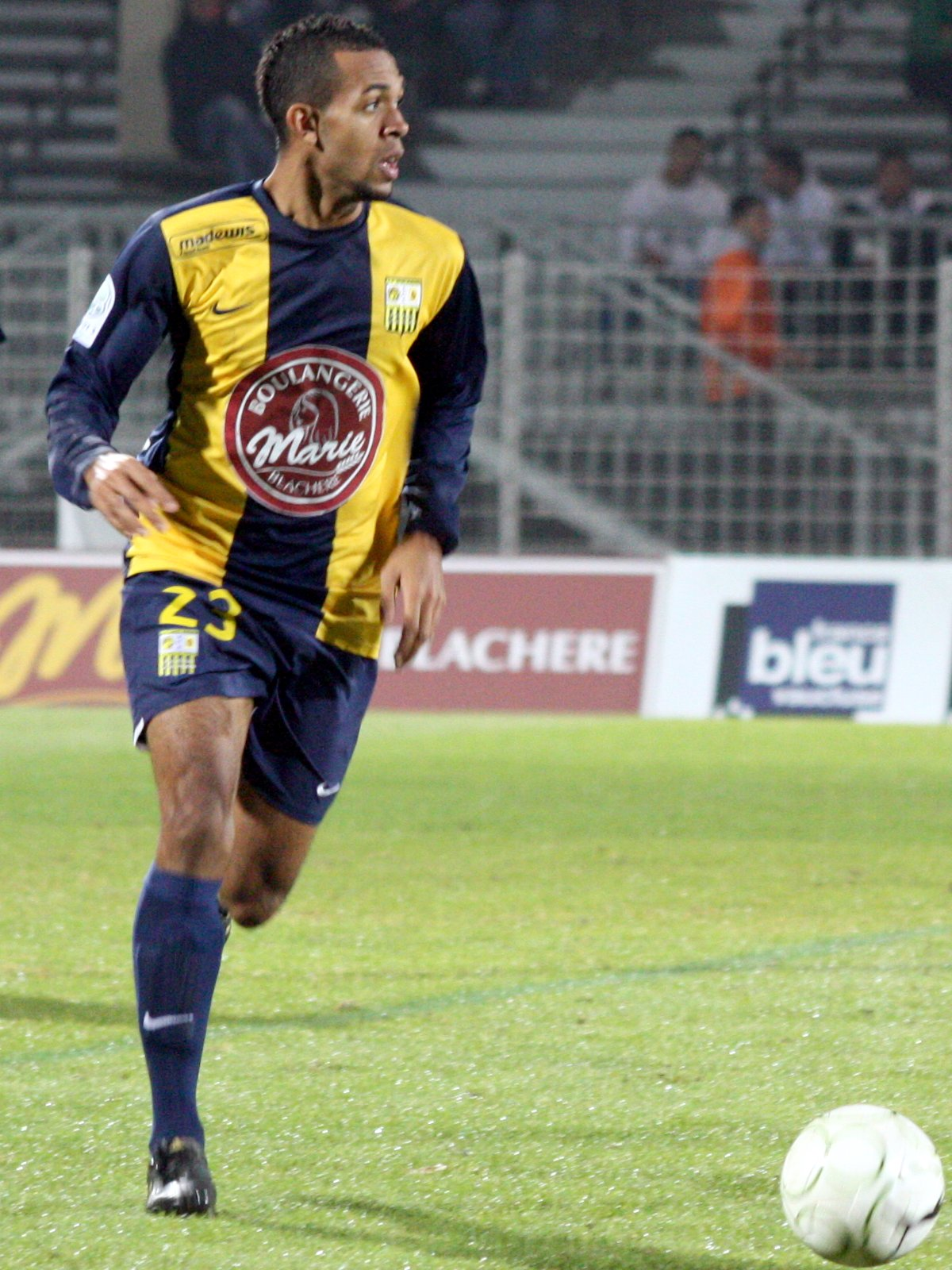

Personal information
- Date of birth: 21 July 1989 (age 37)
- Place of birth: Paris, France
- Position: Defender

Team information
- Current team: Bassin d'Arcachon

Youth career
- Bordeaux

Senior career*
Years	Team	Apps	(Gls)
2008–2009	Bordeaux B	30	(0)
2009–2010	Arles-Avignon	32	(0)
2010–2013	Clermont	87	(3)
2014–2015	Châteauroux	17	(0)
2015–2016	Créteil	30	(0)
2018–	Bassin d'Arcachon		

International career^{‡}
2012–	Martinique	8	(0)
- * Club domestic league appearances and goals as of 14:48, 17 April 2026 (UTC) ‡ National team caps and goals as of 05:58, 17 July 2021 (UTC)

Marvin Esor (French pronunciation: [maʁvin ezɔʁ]; born 21 July 1989) is a Martiniquais professional footballer who plays in the Championnat National 3 for FC Bassin d'Arcachon.

== Career ==
=== Club career ===
Esor started his career with Bordeaux B.

After a two-year break, Esor returned to football, joining FC Bassin d'Arcachon in the summer 2018. He was later also appointed head coach for the club's U14 team.
