= Titouan Nihouarn =

French footballer (born 2004)

Personal information
- Date of birth: 28 July 2004 (age 22)
- Place of birth: Crozon, France
- Height: 1.84 m (6 ft 1/2 in)
- Position: Forward

Team information
- Current team: Les Herbiers

Youth career
- –2018: Crozon
- 2018–2019: Châteaulin FC
- 2019–2023: Brest

Senior career*
Years	Team	Apps	(Gls)
2023–2024	Brest B	15	(1)
2024–2026	Pau B	37	(3)
2024–2026	Pau	2	(0)
2026–	Les Herbiers	0	(0)
- * Club domestic league appearances and goals as of 11 May 2026

Titouan Nihouarn (born 28 July 2004) is a French professional footballer who plays as a forward for Championnat National 1 club Les Herbiers.

== Club career ==
=== Early career ===
Born in Crozon, Finistère, Nihouarn began his football journey with the local club US Crozon Morgat, later joining Châteaulin F.C., before being recruited by the youth academy of Stade Brestois at the under-14 level.

Originally a striker, he later transitioned to a more withdrawn role as an advanced playmaker with the Brest reserve team. He cites Karim Benzema as a role model for his intelligent positioning and playmaking style.

=== Stade Brestois 29 ===
During his time with the U19s of Stade Brestois 29, Nihouarn played a key role in their Coupe Gambardella campaign. Notably, he scored a last-minute winning goal against LB Châteauroux in February 2022, delivering a right-footed strike in stoppage time to secure victory.

He continued to perform for Brest’s reserve team in Championnat National 3, scoring in key fixtures including a derby win against local rivals Stade Plabennécois in April 2023.

During the 2023–24 season, he was a regular presence for the Brest reserve side, contributing creatively in midfield and showing promise with several strong performances.

=== Pau FC ===
After six years at Stade Brestois, Titouan Nihouarn joined Pau FC in the summer of 2023, initially linking up with the reserve team competing in Championnat National 3. An injury sidelined him for two months early in the 2024–25 season, but he returned to action and began training regularly with the first team at the start of 2025.

He made his senior debut for Pau in Ligue 2 in April 2025, coming on as a late substitute against regional rivals FC Lorient. While continuing to train with the first team, he also played a key role for Pau B, helping the reserves in their battle to avoid relegation.

== Style of play ==
Standing at 1.84 m, Nihouarn is a technically gifted forward known for his vision, off-the-ball movement, and work ethic. Comfortable both as a striker and a deeper playmaker, he often drops into midfield to link play and draw defenders, helping his team progress up the pitch.

== Personal life ==
A native of Crozon in Brittany, Nihouarn balances his football career with academics and has previously spoken about the challenges of life as a student-athlete. Raised in a supportive family environment, he credits their encouragement as key to his motivation and resilience.
