= 2023–24 Coupe de France preliminary rounds, Nouvelle-Aquitaine =

French football competition

The 2023–24 Coupe de France preliminary rounds, Nouvelle-Aquitaine is the qualifying competition to decide which teams from the leagues of the Nouvelle-Aquitaine region of France take part in the main competition from the seventh round.

A total of fourteen teams will qualify from the Nouvelle-Aquitaine section of the 2023–24 Coupe de France preliminary rounds.

In 2022–23, four teams from the region progressed to the 8th round, but all were eliminated at that stage. Fourth tier Bergerac Périgord FC and Trélissac-Antonne Périgord FC were defeated by Ligue 2 sides Niort and Bordeaux respectively; fifth tier US Lège Cap Ferret lost to third tier LB Châteauroux and fifth tier SO Châtellerault lost to Avoine OCC from the same division.

== Draws and fixtures ==
On 27 July 2023, the league announced that 700 teams from the region had entered the competition. 558 teams took part in the first round, being all the teams registered from the Departmental level divisions, and all but 35 Régional 3 teams. The exempted teams were chosen based on their performance in the previous seasons competition. The second round draw saw all 125 remaining teams from the regional divisions enter the competition. The third round draw was published on 7 September 2023, with the 10 teams from Championnat National 3 entering at this stage.

The fourth round draw, including the four teams from Championnat National 2, was carried out live on the Facebook page of the league on 25 September 2023.

The fifth round draw, which included 1 team from Championnat National, took place on 9 October 2023. The sixth and final regional round was drawn on 19 October 2023.

=== First round ===
These matches were played on 26 and 27 August 2023.

First Round Results: Nouvelle Aquitaine
Tie no	Home team (Tier)	Score	Away team (Tier)
1.	FC Nord 17 (10)	3–1	AS Andilly (11)
2.	ÉS Liginiac (11)	0–3	ES Ussel (8)
3.	AS Saint-Léger Montbrillais (11)	2–0	US Mélusine (11)
4.	ES Oyré-Dangé (10)	2–0	FC Chiché (11)
5.	UAS Verdille (10)	1–3	DR Boucholeurs-Châtelaillon-Yves (9)
6.	AC Sud Saintonge (10)	2–5	US Coutras (10)
7.	AS Jugeals-Noailles (8)	3–0	SS Sainte-Féréole (9)
8.	Peyrehorade SF (10)	2–4	FC Hagetmautien (8)
9.	AS Pontonx (9)	1–4	JAB Pau (10)
10.	Pardies Olympique (8)	3–1	SA Saint-Séverin (9)
11.	US Pays Maixentais (9)	0–1	FC Autize (8)
12.	FC Rouillé (10)	4–1	US Vergentonnaise (11)
13.	FC Airvo Saint-Jouin (9)	4–1	ES La Pallu (10)
14.	US Envigne (11)	0–3 (Note: Tie won by means of forfeit.)	ES Saint-Cerbouillé (9)
15.	ES Bramerit (10)	2–0	US Saint-Martin (11)
16.	Aviron Boutonnais (9)	2–3	Ile d’Oléron Football (9)
17.	CS Saint-Michel-sur-Charente (9)	1–0	Val de Boutonne Foot 79 (10)
18.	FC Saint-Rogatien (10)	1–1 (5–4 p)	FC Boutonnais (10)
19.	AS Cabariot (9)	0–1	ASFC Vindelle (8)
20.	Entente Saint-Séverin/Palluaud (10)	6–0	ÉS Bourcefranc-le-Chapus (11)
21.	AS Périgné (11)	3–0	Breuil-Magné FC (11)
22.	US Saujon (10)	1–4	Stade Ruffec (8)
23.	FC Roullet-Saint-Estèphe (10)	2–1	ALFC Fontcouverte (9)
24.	SC Mouthiers (9)	2–1	ES Tonnacquoise-Lussantaise (10)
25.	USA Montbronn (10)	3–2	CA Saint-Victurnien (11)
26.	FC Charentais L'Isle-d'Espagnac (11)	0–6	CA Brantômois (9)
27.	US Solignac Le Vigen (10)	7–1	Football Cognacois Cyrien Laurentais (10)
28.	AS Saint-Junien (9)	2–0	AS Soyaux (8)
29.	US Nantiat (11)	3–5	US Lessac (9)
30.	AS Pouillé-Tercé (13)	5–1	FC Saint-Maurice/Manot (12)
31.	AS Valdivienne (9)	0–2	FC 3 Vallées 86 (8)
32.	US La Chapelle-Viviers (13)	0–6	FC Usson-Isle (9)
33.	CA Ribéracois (8)	1–5	FC Sud 17 (8)
34.	US La Gémoze (10)	3–2	ES Thénacaise (10)
35.	US Saint-Genis (11)	1–2	FC Gauriaguet-Peujard (12)
36.	ES Montignacoise (11)	0–4	AL Saint-Brice (10)
37.	US Cercoux Clottaise (11)	1–4	US Pons (10)
38.	Red Star Club Saint-Priest-Taurion (11)	0–4	US Saint-Léonard-de-Noblat (8)
39.	AS Seilhac (10)	3–2	ES Bénévent-Marsac (8)
40.	Alouette FC Rive Gauche Limoges (11)	0–2	USC Bourganeuf (9)
41.	Avenir Nord Foot 87 (10)	2–0	AS Châteauneuf-Neuvic (8)
42.	US Bessines-Morterolles (8)	3–0	SA Le Palais-sur-Vienne (8)
43.	Entente Perpezac Sadroc (10)	0–3	ES Nonards (9)
44.	USA Terrasson (11)	6–5	FREP Saint-Germain (10)
45.	Périgueux Foot (9)	5–0	AS Marcillac Clergoux (10)
46.	FC Argentat (8)	0–4	SA Sanilhacois (8)
47.	FC Lalinde-Couze-Sauveboeuf (10)	2–1	SC Astaffortais (10)
48.	FC Segonzac / US Saint-Vincent de Connezac (11)	1–4	FC Porte d'Aquitaine 47 (8)
49.	FC Nérac en Albret (9)	3–0	Rouffignac OC (10)
50.	Tonneins FC (11)	1–3	US Gontaud (9)
51.	VS Caudrot (10)	3–3 (4–5 p)	CM Floirac (11)
52.	Union Saint-Médard Petit-Palais (10)	1–1 (3–4 p)	FC Ambès (11)
53.	FC Arsac-Pian Médoc (8)	2–0	ES Eysinaise (8)
54.	FC Parentis (9)	1–6	SC Saint-Symphorien (9)
55.	USJ Saint-Augustin Club Pyrénées Aquitaine (10)	2–2 (0–3 p)	Stade Pessacais UC (9)
56.	FC Lacajunte-Tursan (10)	4–1	Chalosse FC (10)
57.	FC Espagnol Pau (11)	0–5	Les Labourdins d'Ustaritz (8)
58.	Labenne OSC (9)	1–2	AS Tarnos (8)
59.	SC Arthez Lacq Audejos (8)	0–1	Violette Aturine (8)
60.	US Saint-Palais Amikuze (10)	2–4	Espérance Oeyreluy (10)
61.	US Armagnac (11)	0–4	US Portugais Pau (8)
62.	Saint-Perdon Sports (9)	1–3	Elan Boucalais (9)
63.	Avenir Mourenxois (8)	5–2	FC Saint-Martin-de-Seignanx (9)
64.	Baiona FC (10)	2–3	FC Saint-Vincent-de-Paul (8)
65.	Association Saint-Laurent Billère (9)	0–1	SC Saint-Pierre-du-Mont (8)
66.	Entente Voulmentin-Saint-Aubin-du-Plain-La Coudre (11)	2–7	FC Vouneuil-sous-Biard-Béruges (10)
67.	FC Plaine Gâtine (12)	3–1	FC Loudun (11)
68.	ES Saint-Amand-sur-Sèvre (11)	1–1 (1–3 p)	US Leigné-sur-Usseau (11)
69.	Biard FC (11)	2–2 (4–3 p)	SL Cenon-sur-Vienne (12)
70.	ES Fayenoirterre (11)	7–0	ES Lutaizien-Oiron (12)
71.	Ozon FC (8)	4–4 (3–4 p)	US Saint-Varent Pierregeay (9)
72.	US Cissé (12)	1–8	CEP Poitiers (10)
73.	US Champdeniers-Pamplie (11)	1–0	US Avanton (11)
74.	AS Portugais Cerizay (10)	1–1 (3–4 p)	FC Pays de l'Ouin (9)
75.	ASC Portugais Parthenay et de Gâtine (12)	2–6	AS Colombiers (11)
76.	AS Augé/Azay-le-Brûlé (12)	0–2	AS Portugais Châtellerault (8)
77.	CS Dissay (12)	1–2	ACS Mahorais 79 (12)
78.	Boivre SC (11)	1–1 (3–2 p)	Chasseneuil-Saint-Georges FC (9)
79.	ES Pays Thénezéen (10)	0–4	Gati-Foot (9)
80.	AS Sainte-Ouenne (12)	1–5	AS Coulonges-Thouarsais (10)
81.	SEPC Exireuil (11)	2–0	Union Cernay-Saint-Genest (11)
82.	US Mirebeau (10)	5–4	ES Beaulieu-Breuil (10)
83.	SC L'Absie-Largeasse/Moutiers-sous-Chantmerle (11)	5–0	AS Breuil-Bernard (12)
84.	Espérance Terves (10)	0–3	FC Pays Néo-Créchois (10)
85.	SC Vouzailles (12)	1–7	CA Saint-Aubin-le-Cloud (9)
86.	ES Louzy (11)	0–1	US Thuré-Besse (10)
87.	US Vrère-Saint-Léger-de-Montbrun (11)	2–0	FC Saint-Jean-Missé (11)
88.	ES Boismé Clessé (12)	1–2	Buslaurs Thireuil (11)
89.	FC Haut Val de Sèvre (11)	1–4	AR Cherveux (11)
90.	AS Ingrandes-sur-Vienne (10)	0–1	FC Pays Argentonnais (10)
91.	SA Mauzé-Rigné (12)	0–10	Inter Bocage FC (8)
92.	CL Noirlieu-Chambroutet Bressuire (11)	0–4	FC Vrines (8)
93.	FC Chanteloup-Courlay-Chapelle (10)	11–1	US Nord Vienne (10)
94.	ES Châtillon Pompaire (11)	3–7	Antran SL (9)
95.	ASA Couronneries (11)	4–1	US Brion 79 (11)
96.	FC Clazay Bocage (11)	2–2 (4–1 p)	AS Poitiers Gibauderie Mahorais (11)
97.	Espoir FC (12)	3–5 (Note: Match abandoned, Espoir FC penalised, USF Pamproux qualify.)	USF Pamproux (12)
98.	US Jaunay-Marigny (10)	1–5	FC Sud Gâtine (9)
99.	FC Comores Bressuire (10)	3–1	FC Fontaine-le-Comte (8)
100.	Coqs Rouges Mansle (11)	3–0	FC Portes d'Océan 17 (none)
101.	CS Beauvoir-sur-Niort (10)	4–0	AS Chaniers (11)
102.	AS Saint-Christophe 17 (10)	2–0	US Aulnay (9)
103.	AS Argenteuil Angerien Poursay-Garnaud (11)	3–2	US Pont l'Abbé d'Arnoult (11)
104.	ASS Portugais La Rochelle (10)	4–2	Canton Aunis FC (10)
105.	SA Niort Souché (11)	0–7	AS Pays Mellois (8)
106.	Avenir Matha (8)	2–2 (4–3 p)	FC Seudre Océan (9)
107.	US Pexinoise Niort (12)	3–4	AS Néré (11)
108.	Taizé-Aizie Les Adjots (12)	0–11	Saint-Palais SF (8)
109.	AS Vars (12)	0–2	FC Saint-Fraigne (11)
110.	CS Venise Verte (10)	3–1	Espoir Haut Vals de Saintonge (11)
111.	AS Aigre (10)	2–2 (3–4 p)	AS Saint-Martin-lès-Melle (11)
112.	EFC Vallée du Coran (11)	1–2	ES Linars (9)
113.	FC Essouvert Loulay (10)	1–2	ES Celles-Verrines (8)
114.	Entente Foot 16 (11)	0–2	US Aigrefeuille (9)
115.	ES Mougon (12)	1–3	US Frontenay-Saint-Symphorien (10)
116.	AS Bel-Air (10)	1–8	AAAM Laleu-La Pallice (8)
117.	ÉS Fléac (10)	2–0	ES Aiffres Fors Prahecq (9)
118.	FC Saint-Cybardeaux (12)	1–3	Nersac FC (10)
119.	AS Mosnac (12)	0–3	La Jarrie FC (10)
120.	US Mauzé-sur-le-Mignon (10)	0–2	Stade Vouillé (8)
121.	ES Brûlain (10)	4–3	FC Canton de Courçon (11)
122.	AS Mons (11)	0–3	AS Maritime (9)
123.	ES Clussais (11)	2–2 (3–1 p)	CO La Couronne (9)
124.	ACS La Rochelle (11)	4–1	US Lezay (11)
125.	FC Bords (11)	1–1 (7–8 p)	JS Angoulins (12)
126.	UC Antenne (12)	0–4	ASPTT Bessines (11)
127.	AC Gond-Pontouvre (11)	3–0	Stade Boisseuillais (11)
128.	FLR Le Monteil (10)	0–2	FC Canton d'Oradour-sur-Vayres (10)
129.	FC des 2 Vallées (10)	3–1	GS Franco-Portugais Gond-Pontouvre (9)
130.	US Tocane-Saint-Apre (11)	0–4	AS Aixoise (8)
131.	AC Kurdes Limoges (11)	0–3	AS Neuvic-Saint-Léon (9)
132.	AS Saint-Jouvent (10)	0–3	OFC Ruelle (9)
133.	CS Léguillac (11)	0–3	FC La Tour Mareuil Verteillac (8)
134.	SC Séreilhac (11)	0–1	FC Saint-Priest-sous-Aixe (8)
135.	US Bouëx (11)	0–3	FC Saint-Brice-sur-Vienne (9)
136.	AS Nexon (10)	4–2	Chabanais FC (11)
137.	US Veyrac (10)	3–2	Fontafie FC (11)
138.	FC Haute Charente (11)	2–3	ES Champniers (8)
139.	Rochechouart OC (10)	1–2	AS Coursac (10)
140.	US Annesse-et-Beaulieu (11)	1–4	La Thibérienne (9)
141.	FC Saint-Paul-la-Roche (12)	1–3	SC Agris (12)
142.	US La Roche l'Abeille (10)	0–2	JS Castellevequoise (9)
143.	Vigenal FC Limoges (9)	1–0	Mayotte FC Limoges (10)
144.	AS Places (11)	1–6	US Chasseneuil (10)
145.	Limens JSA (8)	0–0 (5–4 p)	Auvézère Mayne FC (9)
146.	FC Pays Arédien (10)	3–4	ES Mornac (10)
147.	SC Verneuil-sur-Vienne (9)	5–0	AC Turques Limoges (10)
148.	US Oradour-sur-Glane (11)	3–0	AS Puymoyen (8)
149.	Les Aiglons Razacois (11)	1–7	JS Basseau Angoulême (8)
150.	US Feuillardiers (11)	4–0	AS Saint-Germain-Chantérac (11)
151.	FC Brigueuil (10)	4–0	AS Chazelles (11)
152.	RC Carsac Sarlat Portugais (12)	1–9	AS Brie (9)
153.	US Abzac (11)	1–2	US Leignes-sur-Fontaine (11)
154.	ES Élan Charentais (11)	2–3	US Roches-La Villedieu (12)
155.	US Vicq-sur-Gartempe (9)	4–2	ACG Foot Sud 86 (10)
156.	AS Lussac-les-Églises (11)	2–2 (4–2 p)	Avenir Bellac-Berneuil-Saint-Junien-les-Combes (9)
157.	FC Jardres (12)	0–5	CA Saint-Savin-Saint-Germain (8)
158.	ES Brion-Saint-Secondin (10)	1–0	AS Sèvres-Anxaumont (10)
159.	Valence-en-Poitou OC (10)	0–3	AAS Saint-Julien-l'Ars (10)
160.	CS Chatainais (12)	1–1 (5–6 p)	FC Confolentais (8)
161.	FC Vallée du Salleron (12)	3–0	ÉS Bonnes (13)
162.	FC Fleuré (10)	2–1	ES Saint-Benoit (9)
163.	US Pressac (13)	2–2 (2–4 p)	FC Valence-en-Poitou Couhé (12)
164.	US Champagne-Mouton (12)	1–3	FC Smarves Iteuil (9)
165.	OC Sommières Saint-Romain (11)	4–2	Entente Saint-Maurice-Gençay (11)
166.	ES Trois Cités Poitiers (9)	0–1	ES Nouaillé (8)
167.	AS Mignaloux-Beauvoir (8)	2–2 (9–8 p)	FC Montamisé (9)
168.	Amicale Coussay-les-Bois (11)	3–0	US Le Dorat (11)
169.	Espérance Availles-en-Châtellerault (10)	3–0	US Vivonne (11)
170.	AS Vanxains (11)	3–1	CF Crouin (12)
171.	AS Chadenac Jarnac Marignac (11)	1–2	FC Cubnezais (11)
172.	Montpon-Ménesplet FC (8)	2–1	FC Estuaire Haute Gironde (8)
173.	AS Claix-Blanzac (10)	2–2 (12–13 p)	US Nord Gironde (9)
174.	US Artiguaise (9)	4–2	Stade Blayais (9)
175.	LA Genté (11)	4–0	FC Vallée de l'Aria (10)
176.	FC Cubzac-les-Ponts (11)	0–0 (3–2 p)	Saint-Hilaire FC (11)
177.	US Saint-Denis-de-Pile (10)	5–0	SC Bédenac Laruscade (11)
178.	AS Pugnac (11)	0–1	JS Grande Champagne (10)
179.	ES Javrezac Jarnouzeau (11)	0–2	Alliance de la Dronne FC (10)
180.	ES Fronsadaise (10)	5–0	AJ Montmoreau (10)
181.	JS Bersonnaise (11)	0–3	FCA Moron (8)
182.	RC Saint-Exupéry (11)	1–4	AS Turcs Ussel (9)
183.	CA Chamboulive (10)	3–1	CA Rilhac-Rancon (8)
184.	AS Maussacoise (10)	3–0	US Grand-Bourg (11)
185.	FC Sauviat-sur-Vige (11)	1–5	RFC Sainte-Feyre (9)
186.	US Saint-Clementoise (10)	1–0	Diables Bleus Bersac (11)
187.	ES Dun-Naillat (9)	0–0 (4–5 p)	ES La Courtine Crocq La Villeneuve (10)
188.	Épis de Royères (11)	0–1	Espoirs La Geneytouse (10)
189.	AS Eymoutiers (9)	3–0	US Saint-Fiel (9)
190.	US Versillacoise (10)	7–1	US Vallière (10)
191.	FC Saint-Martin-Terressus (13)	2–0	Boisseuil FC (11)
192.	SC Flayat (10)	0–3	US Auzances (9)
193.	ES Ahunoise (10)	3–4	ES Evaux-Budelière (9)
194.	Foot Sud 87 (10)	2–0	ES Marchoise (8)
195.	USS Mérinchal (9)	0–4	USA Compreignac (9)
196.	FC Saint-Jal (11)	2–2 (3–4 p)	ES Soursac (11)
197.	US Saint-Vaury (10)	0–1	AS Ambazac (9)
198.	Occitane FC (9)	10–0	JS Chambon-sur-Voueize (10)
199.	US Beaune-les-Mines (10)	0–2	AS Saint-Sulpice-le-Guérétois (8)
200.	Varetz AC (10)	7–0	CS Allassac (10)
201.	FC Cublac (11)	0–10	Olympique Larche Lafeuillade (9)
202.	AS Champcevinel (10)	6–1	US Lanteuil (9)
203.	FC Objat (10)	0–2	FC Thenon-Limeyrat-Fossemagne (10)
204.	ASV Malemort (9)	2–1	ASPO Brive (9)
205.	Cosnac FC (10)	2–0	FC Atur (10)
206.	AS Mercoeur (11)	1–5	Entente Périgord Noir (11)
207.	US Marsaneix Manoire (10)	0–7	Entente SR3V (9)
208.	CA Brignac (11)	1–2	AS Meyssac (11)
209.	Amicale Saint-Hilaire Venersal (10)	0–2	FC Cornilois-Fortunadais (9)
210.	Entente des Barrages de la Xaintrie (11)	1–2	AS Beynat (9)
211.	ES Portugais Brive (10)	1–3	FC Bassimilhacois (9)
212.	FC Excideuil Saint-Médard (11)	5–2	Condat FC (11)
213.	ES Périgord Vert (11)	5–1	FC Saint-Geniès (11)
214.	AS Passage FC (10)	2–3	FC Limeuil (9)
215.	OS Agenais (10)	1–6	Monflanquin FC (9)
216.	US Pays de Fénelon (10)	2–0	FC Côteaux Pécharmant (8)
217.	Confluent Football 47 (8)	3–0	FC Faux (9)
218.	US Port Sainte-Marie Feugarolles (10)	1–1 (4–3 p)	AS Laugnac (11)
219.	FC Roquefortais (11)	0–0 (3–4 p)	AS Livradaise (12)
220.	FC Belvès (11)	1–3	AS Castillonnès Cahuzac Lalande (10)
221.	Football Sud Bastide (11)	3–3 (4–3 p)	Lamontjoie FC (11)
222.	Entente Grignols Villamblard (10)	3–6	UFC Saint-Colomb-de-Lauzun (9)
223.	FC Vallée du Lot (8)	3–1	US La Catte (8)
224.	FC Pineuilh (11)	0–3	FC Casteljaloux (9)
225.	AS Sauveterrienne (11)	1–3	ES Ambares (9)
226.	AS Pays de Montaigne et Gurçon (9)	5–1	FC Monbazillac-Sigoules (10)
227.	FC Gironde La Réole (11)	2–4	Pays de l'Eyraud (9)
228.	Bleuets Macariens (11)	0–4	US Virazeil-Puymiclan (9)
229.	FC Saint-Antoine (11)	0–6	AS Marcellus-Cocumont (9)
230.	Union Vallée de Garonne Illats (11)	2–3	FC Vallée de la Dordogne (11)
231.	ES Mazères-Roaillan (11)	1–3	CMO Bassens (8)
232.	AS Montferrandaise (11)	0–6	Mas AC (8)
233.	FC Côteaux Libournais (9)	1–6	FC Pays Aurossais (8)
234.	AS Villandraut-Préchac (11)	3–0	AS Côteaux Dordogne (10)
235.	SJ Bergerac (10)	1–0	AS Gensac-Montcaret (9)
236.	FC Houeillès (12)	0–5	Sud Gironde FC (9)
237.	RS Saint-Sernin (11)	1–2	Fraternelle Landiras (10)
238.	SC Monségur (10)	3–0	US Bazeillaise (10)
239.	ES Verdelais-Saint-Maixant-Semens (12)	2–3	AS Pellegrue (10)
240.	Athletic 89 FC (9)	2–2 (9–8 p)	AS Miramont-Lavergne (9)
241.	US Lamothe-Mongauzy (11)	2–2 (4–5 p)	US Farguais (10)
242.	US Saint-Germain-d'Esteuil (11)	0–0 (4–3 p)	AS Beautiran FC (11)
243.	CA Castets-en-Dorthe (9)	1–1 (3–4 p)	Bouliacaise FC (10)
244.	Parempuyre FC (11)	3–3 (2–3 p)	Landes Girondines FC (11)
245.	ES Canéjan (11)	1–4	RC Bordeaux (8)
246.	CMS Haut-Médoc (11)	1–5	FC Rive Droite 33 (8)
247.	Union Saint-Jean (10)	2–0	FC Médoc Océan (8)
248.	FC Pierroton Cestas Toctoucau (10)	1–1 (3–4 p)	FC Born (8)
249.	JS Teichoise (11)	3–2	FC Barpais (9)
250.	APIS en Aquitaine (11)	1–4	CA Sainte-Hélène (8)
251.	AGJA Caudéran (10)	3–2	CS Portugais Villenave-d'Ornon (10)
252.	US Ludon (11)	2–2 (5–4 p)	AS Saint-Aubin-de-Médoc (10)
253.	Coqs Rouges Bordeaux (8)	1–2	SC Cadaujac (8)
254.	US Le Temple-Le Porge (11)	1–7	SJ Macaudaise (9)
255.	Bordeaux Étudiants CF (9)	1–2	Biscarrosse OFC (8)
256.	Saint-Seurin Saint-Estèphe FC (11)	1–1 (1–3 p)	AS Le Taillan (8)
257.	ES Bruges (10)	1–3	CS Lantonnais (8)
258.	SC Bastidienne (10)	0–4	FC Belin-Béliet (8)
259.	Union Pauillac Saint-Laurent (11)	2–3	Pessac FC (11)
260.	Haillan Foot 33 (10)	2–2 (2–4 p)	AG Vendays-Montalivet (10)
261.	Cazaux Olympique (8)	1–2	RC Chambéry (8)
262.	FC Escource (11)	1–6	Montesquieu FC (9)
263.	USC Léognan (10)	7–1	Ychoux FC (11)
264.	ES Nay-Vath-Vielha (9)	2–0	Bleuets Pau (9)
265.	Entente Haut Béarn (10)	0–2	Kanboko Izarra (11)
266.	ES Bournos-Doumy-Garlède (10)	6–0	FC Amou-Poudenx (11)
267.	US Marsan (8)	4–0	Carresse Salies FC (9)
268.	AS Lous Marous/FC Saint-Geours (9)	5–0	AS Bretagne-de-Marsan (9)
269.	ES Latrilloise (11)	2–3	FC Lons (9)
270.	RC Dax (11)	0–1	FC Vallée de l'Ousse (9)
271.	Ardanavy FC (10)	0–0 (8–9 p)	FC Luy de Béarn (9)
272.	AS Mourenx-Bourg (12)	1–2	FC Artiguelouve-Arbus-Aubertin (9)
273.	FC Mées (11)	1–2	FC Roquefort Saint-Justin (9)
274.	AS Artix (9)	2–3	Marensin FC (9)
275.	US Castétis-Gouze (9)	0–0 (6–5 p)	ES Meillon-Assat-Narcastet (8)
276.	FC des Enclaves et du Plateau (10)	3–1	SC Taron Sévignacq (11)
277.	AS des Églantines de Hendaye (10)	2–0	FC La Ribère (8)
278.	Papillons de Pontacq (10)	1–1 (4–5 p)	Union Jurançonnaise (8)
279.	Étoile Béarnaise FC (11)	0–3	FA Bourbaki Pau (10)

=== Second round ===
These matches were played on 2 and 3 September 2023, with one postponed until 17 September 2023.

Second Round Results: Nouvelle Aquitaine
Tie no	Home team (Tier)	Score	Away team (Tier)
1.	FC Nord 17 (10)	0–7	Capaunis ASPTT FC (8)
2.	OFC Ruelle (9)	2–4	JA Isle (7)
3.	US Bouscataise (7)	2–0	La Brède FC (6)
4.	Patronage Bazadais (8)	3–6	ES Nay-Vath-Vielha (9)
5.	Croisés Saint-André Bayonne (6)	3–1	Seignosse-Capbreton-Soustons FC (7)
6.	US Aigrefeuille (9)	2–4	AS Saint-Christophe 17 (10)
7.	Antran SL (9)	1–3	SA Moncoutant (7)
8.	FC Périgny (7)	1–0	SC Saint-Jean-d'Angély (6)
9.	DR Boucholeurs-Châtelaillon-Yves (9)	3–5	FC Dompierre-Sainte-Soulle (7)
10.	AAAM Laleu-La Pallice (8)	1–0	FC Autize (8)
11.	AS Maritime (9)	0–2	Aunis AFC (8)
12.	FC Smarves Iteuil (9)	0–0 (5–4 p)	FC Rouillé (10)
13.	AS Pouillé-Tercé (13)	1–10	JS Nieuil l'Espoir (8)
14.	FC 3 Vallées 86 (8)	2–1	La Ligugéenne Football (7)
15.	ES Nouaillé (8)	0–0 (12–13 p)	ES Château-Larcher (8)
16.	USA Compreignac (9)	1–1 (2–3 p)	CA Saint-Savin-Saint-Germain (8)
17.	UES Montmorillon (7)	2–1	USE Couzeix-Chaptelat (6)
18.	FC Cornilois-Fortunadais (9)	0–4	AF Portugais Limoges (7)
19.	CA Meymac (8)	1–3	Tulle Football Corrèze (7)
20.	US Auzances (9)	1–0	RFC Sainte-Feyre (9)
21.	EF Aubussonnais (8)	1–2	ES Ussel (8)
22.	AS Seilhac (10)	0–5	Limoges Football (7)
23.	ES Nonards (9)	3–3 (3–5 p)	USC Bourganeuf (9)
24.	AS Brie (9)	2–2 (5–3 p)	AS Coursac (10)
25.	USA Montbronn (10)	2–2 (2–4 p)	ES Champniers (8)
26.	ES Mornac (10)	1–1 (4–2 p)	FC Canton d'Oradour-sur-Vayres (10)
27.	JS Basseau Angoulême (8)	2–4	FC Saint-Priest-sous-Aixe (8)
28.	US Chasseneuil (10)	1–4	AS Nontron-Saint-Pardoux (6)
29.	SC Mouthiers (9)	0–0 (1–2 p)	UA Cognac (8)
30.	Ile d’Oléron Football (9)	6–2	US Marennaise (8)
31.	JS Grande Champagne (10)	1–1 (4–3 p)	Avenir Matha (8)
32.	US Pons (10)	1–3	AS Merpins (7)
33.	CS Saint-Michel-sur-Charente (9)	1–2	ES Saintes (7)
34.	JS Sireuil (7)	1–0	Jarnac SF (8)
35.	FC Roullet-Saint-Estèphe (10)	1–3	AS Saint-Yrieix (7)
36.	AS Cozes (7)	2–2 (2–4 p)	Rochefort FC (6)
37.	Nersac FC (10)	6–1	LA Genté (11)
38.	ES Bramerit (10)	2–7	ASFC Vindelle (8)
39.	US Pays de Fénelon (10)	1–4	AS Jugeals-Noailles (8)
40.	FC Limeuil (9)	0–2	US Donzenac (7)
41.	FC Thenon-Limeyrat-Fossemagne (10)	1–2	Varetz AC (10)
42.	AS Beynat (9)	0–4	ESA Brive (6)
43.	FC Grand Saint-Emilionnais (7)	3–2	US Cenon Rive Droite (6)
44.	CMO Bassens (8)	8–1	US Artiguaise (9)
45.	FC Saint André-de-Cubzac (8)	2–2 (5–4 p)	US Mussidan-Saint Medard (7)
46.	FC Sud 17 (8)	2–1	AS Neuvic-Saint-Léon (9)
47.	ES Audenge (7)	0–1	FC Martignas-Illac (8)
48.	Bouliacaise FC (10)	2–4	CS Lantonnais (8)
49.	SC Cadaujac (8)	2–0	Montesquieu FC (9)
50.	AG Vendays-Montalivet (10)	0–4	Jeunesse Villenave (6)
51.	FC des Portes de l'Entre-Deux-Mers (6)	2–1	FC Mascaret (7)
52.	AS Marcellus-Cocumont (9)	1–2	FC Nérac en Albret (9)
53.	UFC Saint-Colomb-de-Lauzun (9)	4–0	Fraternelle Landiras (10)
54.	FC Lalinde-Couze-Sauveboeuf (10)	3–2	US Port Sainte-Marie Feugarolles (10)
55.	Monflanquin FC (9)	1–1 (3–2 p)	US Virazeil-Puymiclan (9)
56.	FC Casteljaloux (9)	1–5	FC Vallée du Lot (8)
57.	FC Porte d'Aquitaine 47 (8)	0–1	FC des Graves (7)
58.	Prigonrieux FC (7)	1–3	SU Agen (8)
59.	US Farguais (10)	2–1	Sud Gironde FC (9)
60.	JAB Pau (10)	2–2 (3–5 p)	AL Poey-de-Lescar (8)
61.	Stade Montois (6)	3–1	FC Tartas Saint-Yaguen (7)
62.	ES Montoise (8)	3–1	FC Oloronais (8)
63.	Élan Béarnaise Orthez (8)	1–5	FC Doazit (7)
64.	FC Roquefort Saint-Justin (9)	1–2	Avenir Mourenxois (8)
65.	FC Luy de Béarn (9)	0–2	Pardies Olympique (8)
66.	FC Saint-Vincent-de-Paul (8)	1–2	SA Mauléonais (8)
67.	Biscarrosse OFC (8)	3–0	Les Labourdins d'Ustaritz (8)
68.	FC Born (8)	1–1 (3–1 p)	CA Sallois (8)
69.	US Solignac Le Vigen (10)	0–1	US Saint-Léonard-de-Noblat (8)
70.	US Vrère-Saint-Léger-de-Montbrun (11)	3–5	CS Naintré (7)
71.	Inter Bocage FC (8)	4–4 (5–3 p)	CO Cerizay (8)
72.	ACS Mahorais 79 (12)	1–5	FC Airvo Saint-Jouin (9)
73.	FC Pays de l'Ouin (9)	2–4	US Saint-Varent Pierregeay (9)
74.	Amicale Coussay-les-Bois (11)	1–6	US Saint-Sauveur (8)
75.	US Leignes-sur-Fontaine (11)	0–6	FC Chanteloup-Courlay-Chapelle (10)
76.	US Leigné-sur-Usseau (11)	1–16	FC Bressuire (6)
77.	US Thuré-Besse (10)	3–2	US Champdeniers-Pamplie (11)
78.	FC Comores Bressuire (10)	0–4	FC Nueillaubiers (6)
79.	US Mirebeau (10)	4–0	FC Clazay Bocage (11)
80.	ES Aubinrorthais (8)	1–0	ES Beaumont-Saint-Cyr (7)
81.	AS Colombiers (11)	0–4	US Vicq-sur-Gartempe (9)
82.	FC Vrines (8)	1–6	CA Neuville (6)
83.	AS Coulonges-Thouarsais (10)	1–3	AS Portugais Châtellerault (8)
84.	FC Pays Argentonnais (10)	0–2	Thouars Foot 79 (6)
85.	ES Saint-Cerbouillé (9)	3–2	ES Oyré-Dangé (10)
86.	AS Saint-Léger Montbrillais (11)	0–1	US Migné-Auxances (8)
87.	ES Brûlain (10)	1–3	RC Parthenay Viennay (7)
88.	CS Venise Verte (10)	1–5	AS Échiré Saint-Gelais (7)
89.	Stade Vouillé (8)	2–2 (2–3 p)	Avenir 79 FC (7)
90.	CA Saint-Aubin-le-Cloud (9)	1–4	OL Saint-Liguaire Niort (7)
91.	SEPC Exireuil (11)	2–4	EF Le Tallud (7)
92.	AS Néré (11)	1–4	FC Pays Néo-Créchois (10)
93.	AS Argenteuil Angerien Poursay-Garnaud (11)	3–4	ASS Portugais La Rochelle (10)
94.	SC L'Absie-Largeasse/Moutiers-sous-Chantmerle (11)	5–1	AR Cherveux (11)
95.	FC Plaine Gâtine (12)	2–2 (5–6 p)	CS Beauvoir-sur-Niort (10)
96.	La Jarrie FC (10)	1–2	ACS La Rochelle (11)
97.	ES Fayenoirterre (11)	0–2	FC Sud Gâtine (9)
98.	JS Angoulins (12)	0–5	FC Réthais (7)
99.	AS Périgné (11)	0–1	ES La Rochelle (6)
100.	ASPTT Bessines (11)	1–1 (1–3 p)	Étoile Maritime FC (6)
101.	US Frontenay-Saint-Symphorien (10)	0–0 (5–4 p)	Gati-Foot (9)
102.	FC Saint-Rogatien (10)	2–1 (Note: FC Saint-Rogatien penalised for fielding too many transferred players, UA Niort Saint-Florent qualify.)	UA Niort Saint-Florent (7)
103.	FC Usson-Isle (9)	0–4	AS Mignaloux-Beauvoir (8)
104.	FC Fleuré (10)	0–3	Stade Ruffec (8)
105.	Boivre SC (11)	1–5	ES Buxerolles (6)
106.	Coqs Rouges Mansle (11)	0–8	AS Pays Mellois (8)
107.	ES Brion-Saint-Secondin (10)	2–1	ASA Couronneries (11)
108.	FC Saint-Fraigne (11)	1–1 (6–5 p)	CEP Poitiers (10)
109.	FC Vouneuil-sous-Biard-Béruges (10)	2–2 (4–3 p)	ES Celles-Verrines (8)
110.	AAS Saint-Julien-l'Ars (10)	1–1 (3–5 p)	ES Clussais (11)
111.	US Roches-La Villedieu (12)	3–3 (4–2 p)	OC Sommières Saint-Romain (11)
112.	FC Valence-en-Poitou Couhé (12)	0–8	Biard FC (11)
113.	US Veyrac (10)	1–2	US Bessines-Morterolles (8)
114.	AS Lussac-les-Églises (11)	0–4	AS Ambazac (9)
115.	FC Brigueuil (10)	3–4	AS Saint-Sulpice-le-Guérétois (8)
116.	US Oradour-sur-Glane (11)	3–3 (6–5 p)	FC Confolentais (8)
117.	US Versillacoise (10)	0–6	FC Charente Limousine (7)
118.	ES Beaubreuil (8)	0–7	ES Guérétoise (6)
119.	FC Vallée du Salleron (12)	2–5	Avenir Nord Foot 87 (10)
120.	US Lessac (9)	4–0	Limoges Landouge (8)
121.	Espoirs La Geneytouse (10)	0–2	CS Boussac (7)
122.	FC Saint-Martin-Terressus (13)	1–3	AS Maussacoise (10)
123.	CA Chamboulive (10)	1–6	CS Feytiat (6)
124.	AS Eymoutiers (9)	4–0	US Saint-Clementoise (10)
125.	ES La Courtine Crocq La Villeneuve (10)	0–3	AS Turcs Ussel (9)
126.	ES Soursac (11)	0–12	AS Gouzon (7)
127.	ES Evaux-Budelière (9)	1–1 (2–5 p)	Vigenal FC Limoges (9)
128.	SC Agris (12)	0–3	CS Leroy Angoulême (7)
129.	AC Gond-Pontouvre (11)	1–0	US Chancelade/Marsac (7)
130.	FC des 2 Vallées (10)	0–4	La Roche/Rivières FC Tardoire (8)
131.	CA Brantômois (9)	0–1	FC Saint-Brice-sur-Vienne (9)
132.	FC La Tour Mareuil Verteillac (8)	0–1	AS Aixoise (8)
133.	Limens JSA (8)	1–1 (2–4 p)	AS Saint-Junien (9)
134.	JS Castellevequoise (9)	1–5	CO Coulouniex-Chamiers (8)
135.	AL Saint-Brice (10)	2–2 (5–4 p)	US La Gémoze (10)
136.	ES Linars (9)	1–1 (10–9 p)	Royan Vaux AFC (7)
137.	ÉS Fléac (10)	0–4	Saint-Palais SF (8)
138.	Cosnac FC (10)	1–8	AS Saint-Pantaleon (7)
139.	Occitane FC (9)	4–0	AS Nexon (10)
140.	ASV Malemort (9)	0–1	Périgueux Foot (9)
141.	FC Bassimilhacois (9)	2–2 (7–8 p)	FC Périgord Centre (8)
142.	ES Périgord Vert (11)	2–3	FC Excideuil Saint-Médard (11)
143.	AS Meyssac (11)	0–10	ES Boulazac (6)
144.	Foot Sud 87 (10)	0–2	SA Sanilhacois (8)
145.	AS Champcevinel (10)	3–3 (10–9 p)	US Feuillardiers (11)
146.	Entente Périgord Noir (11)	0–1	USA Terrasson (11)
147.	La Thibérienne (9)	2–1	Olympique Larche Lafeuillade (9)
148.	Entente SR3V (9)	1–1 (2–3 p)	FC Sarlat-Marcillac (8)
149.	US Coutras (10)	0–0 (1–3 p)	FCA Moron (8)
150.	FC Cubzac-les-Ponts (11)	0–2	Union Saint-Bruno (7)
151.	CM Floirac (11)	2–2 (8–9 p)	Alliance Foot 3B (7)
152.	AS Pays de Montaigne et Gurçon (9)	2–2 (4–3 p) (Note: Tie reversed from original draw.)	FC Gauriaguet-Peujard (12)
153.	RC Bordeaux (8)	0–2	FC Loubesien (8)
154.	Alliance de la Dronne FC (10)	0–0 (4–5 p)	Montpon-Ménesplet FC (8)
155.	US Nord Gironde (9)	3–0	Athletic 89 FC (9)
156.	FC Ambès (11)	1–3	US Lormont (6)
157.	AS Vanxains (11)	0–0 (3–0 p)	ES Ambares (9)
158.	US Saint-Denis-de-Pile (10)	1–2	FC Rive Droite 33 (8)
159.	ES Fronsadaise (10)	1–3	Entente Saint-Séverin/Palluaud (10)
160.	Andernos Sport FC (7)	6–0	CA Béglais (8)
161.	USC Léognan (10)	1–2	ES Blanquefort (7)
162.	Stade Pessacais UC (9)	1–3	FC Arsac-Pian Médoc (8)
163.	AS Le Taillan (8)	2–2 (4–3 p)	FC Saint-Médard-en-Jalles (6)
164.	Landes Girondines FC (11)	3–2	Pessac FC (11)
165.	US Saint-Germain-d'Esteuil (11)	0–10	SA Mérignac (6)
166.	FC Talence (7)	1–6	SAG Cestas (6)
167.	FCE Mérignac Arlac (6)	3–1	FC Pessac Alouette (7)
168.	Union Saint-Jean (10)	1–2	FC Cœur Médoc Atlantique (7)
169.	US Ludon (11)	0–6	CA Sainte-Hélène (8)
170.	SJ Macaudaise (9)	1–1 (4–5 p)	RC Chambéry (8)
171.	AGJA Caudéran (10)	0–2	Stade Saint-Médardais (7)
172.	FC Pays Aurossais (8)	2–4	FC Marmande 47 (7)
173.	AS Castillonnès Cahuzac Lalande (10)	0–13	Entente Boé Bon-Encontre (7)
174.	Mas AC (8)	3–1	AF Casseneuil-Pailloles-Lédat (7)
175.	Targon-Soulignac FC (8)	2–0	ASSA Pays du Dropt (8)
176.	AS Pellegrue (10)	0–6	Langon FC (7)
177.	Football Sud Bastide (11)	2–2 (1–3 p)	SJ Bergerac (10)
178.	FC Vallée de la Dordogne (11)	1–1 (2–4 p)	US Gontaud (9)
179.	Pays de l'Eyraud (9)	1–1 (4–2 p)	Confluent Football 47 (8)
180.	SC Monségur (10)	1–2	AS Livradaise (12)
181.	FC Vallée de l'Ousse (9)	4–2	ES Bournos-Doumy-Garlède (10)
182.	FC des Enclaves et du Plateau (10)	3–0 (Note: Tie won by means of forfeit.)	AS Villandraut-Préchac (11)
183.	SC Saint-Symphorien (9)	2–2 (6–7 p)	FC Lacajunte-Tursan (10)
184.	FC Artiguelouve-Arbus-Aubertin (9)	1–2	Stade Ygossais (7)
185.	FC Lons (9)	1–0	FA Bourbaki Pau (10)
186.	SC Saint-Pierre-du-Mont (8)	0–0 (4–2 p)	Violette Aturine (8)
187.	FC Hagetmautien (8)	2–4	FA Morlaàs Est Béarn (7)
188.	Union Jurançonnaise (8)	0–2	AS Mazères-Uzos-Rontignon (6)
189.	US Portugais Pau (8)	2–2 (1–3 p)	FC Lescar (6)
190.	US Castétis-Gouze (9)	1–0	US Marsan (8)
191.	Kanboko Izarra (11)	2–5	JA Dax (8)
192.	AS des Églantines de Hendaye (10)	1–3	Hiriburuko Ainhara (6)
193.	AS Tarnos (8)	0–2	Arin Luzien (6)
194.	AS Lous Marous/FC Saint-Geours (9)	1–4	FC Bassin d'Arcachon (6)
195.	JS Teichoise (11)	0–0 (2–3 p)	Hasparren FC (7)
196.	Elan Boucalais (9)	4–0	Marensin FC (9)
197.	Espérance Oeyreluy (10)	1–2	JA Biarritz (7)
198.	FC Belin-Béliet (8)	1–2	FC Biganos (6)
199.	Buslaurs Thireuil (11)	1–2	Espérance Availles-en-Châtellerault (10)
200.	FC Cubnezais (11)	1–1 (5–6 p)	FC Sévigné Jonzac-Saint-Germain (8)
201.	SC Verneuil-sur-Vienne (9)	1–3	JS Lafarge Limoges (7)
202.	USF Pamproux (12)	1–2	AS Saint-Martin-lès-Melle (11)

=== Third round ===
These matches were played on 15 and 16 September 2023, with one postponed to 24 September 2023 awaiting the outcome of the previous round.

Third Round Results: Nouvelle Aquitaine
Tie no	Home team (Tier)	Score	Away team (Tier)
1.	ES Buxerolles (6)	2–4	FC Dompierre-Sainte-Soulle (7)
2.	Aunis AFC (8)	5–1	AS Portugais Châtellerault (8)
3.	AAAM Laleu-La Pallice (8)	2–1	FC 3 Vallées 86 (8)
4.	CS Beauvoir-sur-Niort (10)	0–12	Stade Poitevin FC (5)
5.	AS Pays Mellois (8)	5–1	JS Nieuil l'Espoir (8)
6.	US Vicq-sur-Gartempe (9)	0–4	FC Nueillaubiers (6)
7.	AS Saint-Christophe 17 (10)	2–5	ES Château-Larcher (8)
8.	ACS La Rochelle (11)	1–3	US Frontenay-Saint-Symphorien (10)
9.	AS Mignaloux-Beauvoir (8)	1–5	FC Chauray (5)
10.	ES Clussais (11)	0–8	ES La Rochelle (6)
11.	EF Le Tallud (7)	0–0 (3–4 p)	OL Saint-Liguaire Niort (7)
12.	US Mirebeau (10)	0–5	SO Châtellerault (5)
13.	FC Chanteloup-Courlay-Chapelle (10)	1–1 (5–3 p)	Biard FC (11)
14.	SA Moncoutant (7)	3–8	Étoile Maritime FC (6)
15.	RC Parthenay Viennay (7)	2–0	CA Saint-Savin-Saint-Germain (8)
16.	CS Naintré (7)	1–1 (4–5 p)	FC Périgny (7)
17.	FC Pays Néo-Créchois (10)	0–1	Espérance Availles-en-Châtellerault (10)
18.	FC Sud Gâtine (9)	1–1 (4–2 p)	FC Vouneuil-sous-Biard-Béruges (10)
19.	SC L'Absie-Largeasse/Moutiers-sous-Chantmerle (11)	1–5	FC Bressuire (6)
20.	US Saint-Varent Pierregeay (9)	1–0	ES Saint-Cerbouillé (9)
21.	Avenir 79 FC (7)	5–1	Inter Bocage FC (8)
22.	Thouars Foot 79 (6)	4–1	FC Réthais (7)
23.	ES Brion-Saint-Secondin (10)	2–1	Capaunis ASPTT FC (8)
24.	US Thuré-Besse (10)	2–3	AS Échiré Saint-Gelais (7)
25.	ASS Portugais La Rochelle (10)	3–2	FC Airvo Saint-Jouin (9)
26.	US Saint-Sauveur (8)	1–0	ES Aubinrorthais (8)
27.	FC Smarves Iteuil (9)	0–5	CA Neuville (6)
28.	Limoges Football (7)	5–0	FC Saint-Priest-sous-Aixe (8)
29.	AS Aixoise (8)	1–1 (2–4 p)	US Saint-Léonard-de-Noblat (8)
30.	US Lessac (9)	2–8	JA Isle (7)
31.	AS Saint-Junien (9)	2–1	AS Saint-Sulpice-le-Guérétois (8)
32.	Avenir Nord Foot 87 (10)	2–4	ES Guérétoise (6)
33.	US Oradour-sur-Glane (11)	1–1 (4–2 p)	USC Bourganeuf (9)
34.	Vigenal FC Limoges (9)	0–6	AS Panazol (5)
35.	AF Portugais Limoges (7)	1–6	US Chauvigny (5)
36.	AS Eymoutiers (9)	0–2	CS Feytiat (6)
37.	FC Saint-Brice-sur-Vienne (9)	2–1	UES Montmorillon (7)
38.	AS Maussacoise (10)	2–1	ES Ussel (8)
39.	AS Ambazac (9)	0–4	AS Gouzon (7)
40.	US Bessines-Morterolles (8)	0–0 (5–6 p)	CS Boussac (7)
41.	Occitane FC (9)	2–2 (5–4 p)	JS Lafarge Limoges (7)
42.	US Auzances (9)	1–0	Tulle Football Corrèze (7)
43.	AS Turcs Ussel (9)	0–2	FC Charente Limousine (7)
44.	AS Jugeals-Noailles (8)	2–1	SA Sanilhacois (8)
45.	Entente Saint-Séverin/Palluaud (10)	1–2	La Thibérienne (9)
46.	Périgueux Foot (9)	2–1	AS Brie (9)
47.	La Roche/Rivières FC Tardoire (8)	1–1 (3–5 p)	CS Leroy Angoulême (7)
48.	ES Mornac (10)	2–0	AC Gond-Pontouvre (11)
49.	USA Terrasson (11)	2–5	AS Champcevinel (10)
50.	FC Excideuil Saint-Médard (11)	0–4	US Donzenac (7)
51.	AS Vanxains (11)	0–6	AS Saint-Pantaleon (7)
52.	FC Périgord Centre (8)	2–4	ES Boulazac (6)
53.	Varetz AC (10)	0–1	ES Champniers (8)
54.	AS Saint-Yrieix (7)	1–2	CO Coulouniex-Chamiers (8)
55.	AS Nontron-Saint-Pardoux (6)	1–1 (11–10 p)	ESA Brive (6)
56.	AS Merpins (7)	0–0 (3–4 p)	CMO Bassens (8)
57.	Stade Ruffec (8)	5–2	FC Saint André-de-Cubzac (8)
58.	AL Saint-Brice (10)	0–0 (2–4 p)	Stade Bordelais (5)
59.	FC Loubesien (8)	2–1	US Lormont (6)
60.	ES Linars (9)	1–2	ES Blanquefort (7)
61.	Saint-Palais SF (8)	2–0	CA Sainte-Hélène (8)
62.	FCA Moron (8)	0–2	Alliance Foot 3B (7)
63.	Ile d’Oléron Football (9)	1–3	Rochefort FC (6)
64.	FC Arsac-Pian Médoc (8)	3–0	FC Sévigné Jonzac-Saint-Germain (8)
65.	ES Saintes (7)	1–2	ASFC Vindelle (8)
66.	US Nord Gironde (9)	0–3	US Bouscataise (7)
67.	JS Grande Champagne (10)	1–2	FC Sud 17 (8)
68.	Nersac FC (10)	1–6	UA Cognac (8)
69.	FC Saint-Fraigne (11)	0–14	FC Cœur Médoc Atlantique (7)
70.	AS Le Taillan (8)	0–2	JS Sireuil (7)
71.	FC Martignas-Illac (8)	1–0	Union Saint-Bruno (7)
72.	Pays de l'Eyraud (9)	1–4	SC Cadaujac (8)
73.	FC Sarlat-Marcillac (8)	0–1	FC des Graves (7)
74.	Monflanquin FC (9)	0–1	Jeunesse Villenave (6)
75.	FC Vallée du Lot (8)	1–1 (5–3 p)	Stade Saint-Médardais (7)
76.	Entente Boé Bon-Encontre (7)	3–0	CS Lantonnais (8)
77.	Landes Girondines FC (11)	1–2	FC Rive Droite 33 (8)
78.	SJ Bergerac (10)	0–5	SA Mérignac (6)
79.	UFC Saint-Colomb-de-Lauzun (9)	0–4	US Lège Cap Ferret (5)
80.	FC Lalinde-Couze-Sauveboeuf (10)	1–10	Andernos Sport FC (7)
81.	AS Livradaise (12)	0–2	US Gontaud (9)
82.	Montpon-Ménesplet FC (8)	4–2	FC Nérac en Albret (9)
83.	RC Chambéry (8)	0–2	FCE Mérignac Arlac (6)
84.	AS Pays de Montaigne et Gurçon (9)	1–1 (6–7 p)	FC Grand Saint-Emilionnais (7)
85.	SU Agen (8)	1–2	SAG Cestas (6)
86.	Targon-Soulignac FC (8)	3–0	FC des Portes de l'Entre-Deux-Mers (6)
87.	FC Marmande 47 (7)	0–1	Mas AC (8)
88.	Arin Luzien (6)	4–3	Stade Montois (6)
89.	Elan Boucalais (9)	1–0	Croisés Saint-André Bayonne (6)
90.	FC Lescar (6)	6–2	Hasparren FC (7)
91.	FA Morlaàs Est Béarn (7)	2–1	FC Born (8)
92.	FC Doazit (7)	0–7	AS Mazères-Uzos-Rontignon (6)
93.	US Castétis-Gouze (9)	1–4	JA Biarritz (7)
94.	AL Poey-de-Lescar (8)	0–2	FC Bassin d'Arcachon (6)
95.	Stade Ygossais (7)	1–2	Genêts Anglet (5)
96.	FC des Enclaves et du Plateau (10)	1–4	JA Dax (8)
97.	Biscarrosse OFC (8)	1–2	Hiriburuko Ainhara (6)
98.	ES Nay-Vath-Vielha (9)	1–2	Langon FC (7)
99.	FC Lacajunte-Tursan (10)	1–1 (5–6 p)	SC Saint-Pierre-du-Mont (8)
100.	Avenir Mourenxois (8)	1–1 (4–5 p)	Saint-Paul Sport (5)
101.	Pardies Olympique (8)	1–1 (4–3 p)	FC Vallée de l'Ousse (9)
102.	FC Lons (9)	0–1	ES Montoise (8)
103.	US Farguais (10)	0–4	FC Biganos (6)
104.	SA Mauléonais (8)	0–1	Aviron Bayonnais FC (5)
105.	UA Niort Saint-Florent (7)	4–1	US Migné-Auxances (8)
106.	AS Saint-Martin-lès-Melle (11)	2–1	US Roches-La Villedieu (12)

=== Fourth round ===
These matches were played on 30 September and 1 October 2023, with one replayed on 28 October 2023.

Fourth Round Results: Nouvelle Aquitaine
Tie no	Home team (Tier)	Score	Away team (Tier)
1.	ES Brion-Saint-Secondin (10)	0–0 (3–5 p)	Avenir 79 FC (7)
2.	OL Saint-Liguaire Niort (7)	0–3	FC Bressuire (6)
3.	ES Château-Larcher (8)	3–1	ES La Rochelle (6)
4.	FC Chanteloup-Courlay-Chapelle (10)	0–2	Aunis AFC (8)
5.	AAAM Laleu-La Pallice (8)	2–0	AS Pays Mellois (8)
6.	US Saint-Sauveur (8)	0–1	RC Parthenay Viennay (7)
7.	Espérance Availles-en-Châtellerault (10)	1–2	FC Chauray (5)
8.	ASS Portugais La Rochelle (10)	1–9	Thouars Foot 79 (6)
9.	AS Saint-Martin-lès-Melle (11)	1–18	Stade Poitevin FC (5)
10.	US Frontenay-Saint-Symphorien (10)	0–1	FC Dompierre-Sainte-Soulle (7)
11.	AS Échiré Saint-Gelais (7)	0–3	Angoulême Charente FC (4)
12.	FC Nueillaubiers (6)	0–1	FC Périgny (7)
13.	FC Sud Gâtine (9)	1–4	SO Châtellerault (5)
14.	US Saint-Varent Pierregeay (9)	1–5	CA Neuville (6)
15.	Étoile Maritime FC (6)	4–2	UA Niort Saint-Florent (7)
16.	FC Charente Limousine (7)	0–0 (3–4 p)	Stade Ruffec (8)
17.	US Auzances (9)	0–5	JA Isle (7)
18.	ES Champniers (8)	3–2 (Note: The original match was abandoned after a pitch invasion, with the scoreline 3–4. The issue was discussed by the disciplinary committee of the league on 19 October 2023. The disciplinary committee penalised both clubs, removing them from the competition, but Périgueux appealed, and the appeal was due to be heard on 25 October 2023. On 26 October 2023 it was announced the league had instructed the game should be replayed on 28 October 2023, the scheduled date of the sixth round. The replay ended 3–2)	Périgueux Foot (9)
19.	AS Maussacoise (10)	0–4	CS Boussac (7)
20.	US Oradour-sur-Glane (11)	0–2	CS Feytiat (6)
21.	AS Saint-Pantaleon (7)	2–3	US Donzenac (7)
22.	CO Coulouniex-Chamiers (8)	1–3	Trélissac-Antonne Périgord FC (4)
23.	AS Saint-Junien (9)	2–4	ES Guérétoise (6)
24.	US Saint-Léonard-de-Noblat (8)	3–0	Occitane FC (9)
25.	AS Panazol (5)	3–1	AS Nontron-Saint-Pardoux (6)
26.	AS Champcevinel (10)	0–2	US Chauvigny (5)
27.	ES Boulazac (6)	0–0 (3–4 p)	Limoges Football (7)
28.	La Thibérienne (9)	1–2	AS Gouzon (7)
29.	AS Jugeals-Noailles (8)	5–2	FC Saint-Brice-sur-Vienne (9)
30.	Alliance Foot 3B (7)	3–3 (5–3 p)	US Lège Cap Ferret (5)
31.	SA Mérignac (6)	6–1	ES Blanquefort (7)
32.	UA Cognac (8)	0–2	Rochefort FC (6)
33.	Jeunesse Villenave (6)	4–1	CS Leroy Angoulême (7)
34.	FC Sud 17 (8)	1–2	Targon-Soulignac FC (8)
35.	CMO Bassens (8)	2–1	Montpon-Ménesplet FC (8)
36.	FC Cœur Médoc Atlantique (7)	3–0	ASFC Vindelle (8)
37.	US Bouscataise (7)	0–1	JS Sireuil (7)
38.	ES Mornac (10)	1–1 (8–9 p)	FC Rive Droite 33 (8)
39.	FC Martignas-Illac (8)	1–3	FC Libourne (4)
40.	FC Arsac-Pian Médoc (8)	1–5	FCE Mérignac Arlac (6)
41.	FC Loubesien (8)	0–3	Stade Bordelais (5)
42.	FC Grand Saint-Emilionnais (7)	5–1	Saint-Palais SF (8)
43.	AS Mazères-Uzos-Rontignon (6)	1–3	Langon FC (7)
44.	Saint-Paul Sport (5)	1–0	Genêts Anglet (5)
45.	Arin Luzien (6)	2–1	Entente Boé Bon-Encontre (7)
46.	Elan Boucalais (9)	1–2	FC Lescar (6)
47.	SAG Cestas (6)	1–3	Aviron Bayonnais FC (5)
48.	JA Biarritz (7)	5–0	SC Cadaujac (8)
49.	US Gontaud (9)	0–2	FC Bassin d'Arcachon (6)
50.	ES Montoise (8)	2–1	JA Dax (8)
51.	SC Saint-Pierre-du-Mont (8)	0–3	Bergerac Périgord FC (4)
52.	Hiriburuko Ainhara (6)	1–4	FC Biganos (6)
53.	Mas AC (8)	2–1	FC des Graves (7)
54.	Andernos Sport FC (7)	4–2	FC Vallée du Lot (8)
55.	Pardies Olympique (8)	1–4	FA Morlaàs Est Béarn (7)

=== Fifth round ===
These matches were played on 14 and 15 October 2023, with one scheduled for 1 November 2023.

Fifth Round Results: Nouvelle Aquitaine
Tie no	Home team (Tier)	Score	Away team (Tier)
1.	AAAM Laleu-La Pallice (8)	2–3	FC Chauray (5)
2.	Thouars Foot 79 (6)	1–4	Étoile Maritime FC (6)
3.	Stade Ruffec (8)	0–1	AS Panazol (5)
4.	CS Feytiat (6)	1–1 (5-4 p)	ES Guérétoise (6)
5.	SO Châtellerault (5)	0–0 (4-2 p)	US Chauvigny (5)
6.	Avenir 79 FC (7)	0–5	Angoulême Charente FC (4)
7.	FC Périgny (7)	1–0	US Donzenac (7)
8.	CA Neuville (6)	3–0	FC Dompierre-Sainte-Soulle (7)
9.	CS Boussac (7)	1–1 (4–5 p)	Aunis AFC (8)
10.	FC Rive Droite 33 (8)	1–1 (3–0 p)	Langon FC (7)
11.	Mas AC (7)	1–0	Andernos Sport FC (7)
12.	ES Champniers (8)	2–10	FC Bassin d'Arcachon (6)
13.	FC Grand Saint-Emilionnais (7)	1–0	FC Cœur Médoc Atlantique (7)
14.	Aviron Bayonnais (5)	5–0	Stade Bordelais (5)
15.	FC Biganos (6)	2–2 (4–5 p)	FA Morlaàs Est Béarn (7)
16.	FC Lescar (6)	1–3	Trélissac-Antonne Périgord FC (4)
17.	CMO Bassens (8)	1–0	Arin Luzien (6)
18.	Alliance Foot 3B (7)	0–3	Bergerac Périgord FC (4)
19.	Limoges Football (7)	0–3	Stade Poitevin FC (5)
20.	US Saint-Léonard-de-Noblat (8)	2–5	ES Château-Larcher (8)
21.	FC Bressuire (6)	1–2	Chamois Niortais FC (3)
22.	RC Parthenay Viennay (7)	3–2	AS Jugeals-Noailles (8)
23.	JA Isle (7)	2–2 (5–4 p)	AS Gouzon (7)
24.	JS Sireuil (7)	0–1	Jeunesse Villenave (6)
25.	SA Mérignac (6)	0–1	FC Libourne (4)
26.	FCE Mérignac Arlac (6)	0–0 (4–5 p)	Rochefort FC (6)
27.	ES Montoise (8)	0–5	JA Biarritz (7)
28.	Targon-Soulignac FC (8)	1–5	Saint-Paul Sport (5)

=== Sixth round ===
These matches were played on 28 and 29 October 2023, with one replayed on 1 November 2023, one postponed to 5 November 2023, and one played on 8 November 2023 after issues outstanding from previous rounds were resolved.

Sixth Round Results: Nouvelle Aquitaine
Tie no	Home team (Tier)	Score	Away team (Tier)
1.	CS Feytiat (6)	1–2	Bergerac Périgord FC (4)
2.	FC Périgny (7)	2–3	Stade Poitevin FC (5)
3.	FC Grand Saint-Emilionnais (7)	0–5	FC Chauray (5)
4.	JA Biarritz (7)	1–2	Trélissac-Antonne Périgord FC (4)
5.	Rochefort FC (6)	0–1 (Note: The original match was abandoned with 25 minutes to play, as the pitch had become unplayable due to bad weather. Rochefort led 1–0 at the time. The match was replayed on 1 November 2023.)	Étoile Maritime FC (6)
6.	FC Libourne (4)	3–0	SO Châtellerault (5)
7.	Aviron Bayonnais (5)	3–2	Chamois Niortais FC (3)
8.	FA Morlaàs Est Béarn (7)	0–0 (5–3 p)	CA Neuville (6)
9.	Mas AC (7)	0–5	AS Panazol (5)
10.	Aunis AFC (8)	0–0 (4–2 p) (Note: The match was not played on the original date, due to a technical problem at the stadium. The match was replayed on 5 November 2023.)	Saint-Paul Sport (5)
11.	CMO Bassens (8)	0–5	Angoulême Charente FC (4)
12.	Jeunesse Villenave (6)	1–0	RC Parthenay Viennay (7)
13.	ES Château-Larcher (8)	2–4	JA Isle (7)
14.	FC Rive Droite 33 (8)	1–2	FC Bassin d'Arcachon (6)
