= Salif Lebouath =

French footballer (born 2001)

Personal information
- Date of birth: 14 November 2001 (age 24)
- Place of birth: Toulouse, France
- Height: 1.84 m (6 ft 0 in)
- Position: Winger

Team information
- Current team: Valenciennes

Youth career
- 2008–2009: FC Quint-Fonsegrives
- 2009–2014: SC Balma
- 2014–2016: Toulouse Fontaines Club
- 2016–2018: Toulouse Metropole FC

Senior career*
Years	Team	Apps	(Gls)
2020–2022	US Colomiers B		
2022–2024	US Colomiers	28	(4)
2024–2026	Pau B	42	(9)
2025–2026	Pau FC	9	(0)
2026–	Valenciennes	0	(0)
- * Club domestic league appearances and goals as of 29 May 2026

Salif Lebouath (born 14 November 2001) is a French professional footballer who plays as a winger for Ligue 3 club Valenciennes.

== Club career ==
Born in Toulouse, Lebouath grew up in the surrounding region and began his youth career with FC Quint-Fonsegrives in 2008. He joined SC Balma the following year, then moved to Toulouse Fontaines Club in 2014. After the club became Toulouse Métropole FC in 2016, he remained until 2018, when he signed for US Colomiers.

At Colomiers, Lebouath progressed through the youth and reserve sides before earning appearances with the first team.

In July 2024, he joined Pau FC on a free transfer. Included in the pre-season squad, he spent his first year in Béarn playing exclusively for Pau FC B in the Championnat National 3.

He made his Ligue 2 debut for Pau FC on 9 August 2025, starting in a 2–0 home win over FC Annecy.

== Personal life ==
Born in France, Lebouath is of Algerian descent.

== Career statistics ==
As of match played 16 August 2025

Appearances and goals by club, season and competition
Club	Season	League			Coupe de France		Total	
Club	Season	Division	Apps	Goals	Apps	Goals	Apps	Goals
Pau FC	2025–26	Ligue 2	5	0	—		5	0
Career total			5	0	0	0	5	0
