= Omar Sadik =

Moroccan footballer (born 2004)

Personal information
- Date of birth: 22 March 2004 (age 22)
- Place of birth: Beni Mellal, Morocco
- Height: 1.85 m (6 ft 1 in)
- Position: Forward

Team information
- Current team: Ceuta (on loan from Espanyol)

Youth career
- Mohammed VI Academy
- 2022–2023: → Espanyol (loan)

Senior career*
Years	Team	Apps	(Gls)
2023	Mohammed VI Academy	0	(0)
2023	→ Espanyol B (loan)	0	(0)
2023–2025	Espanyol B	39	(13)
2023–	Espanyol	2	(0)
2025–2026	→ Pau (loan)	27	(3)
2026–	→ Ceuta (loan)	0	(0)

International career
2022–	Morocco U20	10	(2)
- * Club domestic league appearances and goals as of 11 May 2026

Omar Sadik (Arabic: عمر صديق; born 22 March 2004) is a Moroccan footballer who plays as a forward for Spanish club AD Ceuta FC, on loan from RCD Espanyol.

== Club career ==
Sadik began his career with the Mohammed VI Football Academy before joining the Juvenil A team of RCD Espanyol on 26 August 2022. He made his senior debut with the reserves on 20 May 2023, coming on as a second-half substitute in a 1–0 home loss to Atlético Madrid B, in the 2023 Segunda Federación play-offs.

On 31 July 2023, Espanyol announced an agreement with Mohammed VI for the purchase of Sadik, with the player signing a four-year deal with the Pericos. He scored his first senior goal on 10 September, netting the B's equalizer in a 2–1 away loss to CF La Nucía; he was sent off later in the match.

Sadik made his first team debut on 31 October 2023, starting in a 2–0 win at CD Mensajero, for the season's Copa del Rey. His professional debut occurred on 5 December, as he started in a 3–1 home success over Real Valladolid, also for the national cup.

On 9 July 2025, Sadik joined Pau FC, competing in Ligue 2, on a season-long loan for the 2025–26 season. Roughly one year later, he moved to Segunda División side AD Ceuta FC also in a temporary one-year deal.

== International career ==
Sadik represented Morocco at under-20 level. Participating in the 2022 Mediterranean Games, he was a key player in the bronze final match, scoring once as Morocco claimed bronze medals ahead of Turkey.
