= Robert Domergue =

French footballer and manager (1921-2014)

Personal information
- Date of birth: 21 November 1921
- Place of birth: Cannes, France
- Date of death: 22 January 2014 (aged 92)
- Position: Defender

Senior career*
Years	Team	Apps	(Gls)
1939–1947	Cannes		

Managerial career
- 1950–1953: Alès
- 1953–1966: Valenciennes
- 1966: France (assistant)
- 1966–1968: Marseille
- 1968–1969: ES Tunis
- 1969–1970: Monaco
- 1970–1972: Valenciennes
- 1973–1974: Strasbourg
- 1976–1981: Cannes
- 1981–1984: Dunkerque
- * Club domestic league appearances and goals

Robert Domergue (21 November 1921 – 22 January 2014) was a French football player and manager.
