= Bruno Zaremba =

French footballer (1955-2018)

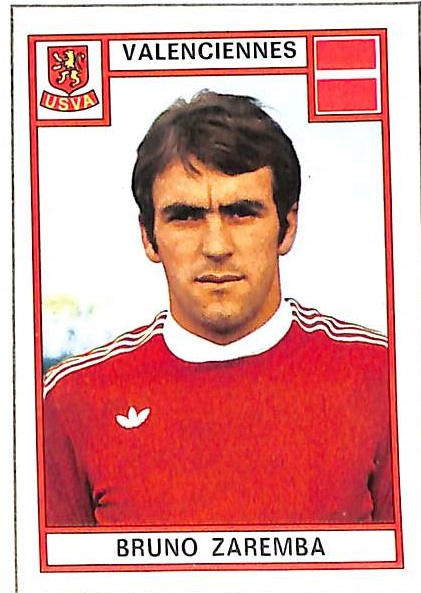

Personal information
- Date of birth: 7 April 1955
- Place of birth: Fresnes-sur-Escaut, France
- Date of death: 5 November 2018 (aged 63)
- Height: 1.75 m (5 ft 9 in)
- Position: Striker

Senior career*
Years	Team	Apps	(Gls)
1973–1978	Valenciennes	149	(58)
1980–1981	Metz	64	(14)
1980–1981	Valenciennes	22	(4)
1981–1985	Dunkerque	129	(20)
1985–1987	Arras		
Total		364	(96)
- * Club domestic league appearances and goals

Bruno Zaremba (7 April 1955 – 5 November 2018) was a French professional footballer who played as a striker for Valenciennes, Metz, Dunkerque and Arras.

== Personal life ==
His younger brother Pascal was also a footballer.
