= Enzo Derouin =

French footballer (born 2007)

Personal information
- Date of birth: 22 October 2007 (age 19)
- Place of birth: France
- Height: 1.77 m (5 ft 10 in)
- Position: Left-back

Team information
- Current team: Pau B

Youth career
- Stade Rennais
- 2021–2024: TA Rennes

Senior career*
Years	Team	Apps	(Gls)
2024–2025	Bassin d'Arcachon	23	(1)
2025–	Pau B	20	(2)
- * Club domestic league appearances and goals as of 5 September 2026

Enzo Derouin (born 22 October 2007) is a French footballer who plays as a left-back for Championnat National 2 side Pau B.

== Club career ==
Enzo Derouin began his youth career at Stade Rennais FC, where he played until the under-14 level. After leaving Rennes, he continued his development with TA Rennes, featuring prominently in their under-17 team during the 2023–24 season. He made 24 appearances, including 20 starts, scoring 4 goals and providing 2 assists.

In the summer of 2024, Derouin joined FC Bassin d'Arcachon, newly promoted to the Championnat National 3, the fifth division of the French football league system. During the 2024–25 season, he appeared in 23 matches, including 9 starts. He scored 1 goal and delivered 2 assists, establishing himself as a key player at left-back.

On 27 June 2025, Pau FC announced the signing of Derouin on a long-term contract. The club described the transfer as a significant step in the young full-back’s development, who will continue his progression with the Ligue 2 side.
