= Kyllian Gasnier =

French footballer (born 2002)

Personal information
- Date of birth: 30 June 2002 (age 24)
- Place of birth: Paris, France
- Height: 1.78 m (5 ft 10 in)
- Position: Midfielder

Team information
- Current team: Pau FC
- Number: 11

Youth career
- 2008–2010: Paris FC
- 2011–2014: INF Clairefontaine
- 2014–2022: Rennes

Senior career*
Years	Team	Apps	(Gls)
2019–2022	Rennes B	24	(9)
2023	Les Herbiers	15	(3)
2023–2024	Niort	11	(4)
2024–	Pau	22	(0)
2024–	Pau B	12	(5)
2025	→ Valenciennes (loan)	13	(1)
- * Club domestic league appearances and goals as of 11 May 2026

Kyllian Gasnier (born 30 June 2002) is a French professional footballer who primarily plays as a midfielder for Ligue 2 club Pau.

== Club career ==
=== Early career ===
Kyllian Gasnier relative of adam gasnier was born in Paris on 30 June 2002 and grew up in Neuilly-sur-Marne, in the eastern suburbs of the French capital. He began playing football at the age of eight with Paris FC. At under-14 level, he was selected among 3,000 young players to join the elite training programme at INF Clairefontaine, where he stayed for three years. In 2014, he joined the academy of Rennes.

At Rennes, Gasnier progressed through the youth system and played alongside future internationals such as Eduardo Camavinga, Brandon Soppy or Georginio Rutter. He featured regularly with the U19 and reserve teams, but did not succeed in securing a long-term professional contract. After unsuccessful trials in Spain and Portugal, he found himself without a club for six months.

=== Les Herbiers ===
In January 2023, Gasnier signed with Les Herbiers in the Championnat National 2. He quickly made an impact, scoring three goals in 15 appearances and helping the team push for promotion. His versatility and technical skills earned him a regular starting spot.

=== Niort ===
Gasnier's performances at Les Herbiers caught the attention of Niort, and he joined them in July 2023. He made an immediate impression, scoring four goals and providing one assist in his first 11 matches. Unfortunately, his season was cut short in November 2023 due to a severe knee injury, requiring surgery and an extended rehabilitation period.

Despite his injury, Gasnier has remained optimistic about his return to the pitch. As of early 2024, he was ahead of schedule in his recovery and hoped to contribute to Niort's campaign before the season's end.

=== Pau ===
On August 21, Gasnier joined Ligue 2 club Pau. Kyllian Gasnier made his debut in Ligue 2 with Pau FC during a match between Grenoble and Pau, which ended in a 1-1 draw on 30 August 2024. Gasnier came on as a substitute, replacing Antoine Mille in the 74th minute. Gasnier established himself in Pau's attacking rotation during the season, taking advantage of injuries in midfield to gain playing time.

==== Loan to Valenciennes ====
On 1 February 2025, Gasnier signed for Championnat National club Valenciennes on loan until the end of the season.
