= Noah Raveyre =

French footballer (born 2005)

Personal information
- Full name: Noah Joseph Guy Raveyre
- Date of birth: 22 June 2005 (age 21)
- Place of birth: Le Puy-en-Velay, France
- Height: 1.95 m (6 ft 5 in)
- Position: Goalkeeper

Team information
- Current team: Alverca
- Number: 1

Youth career
- 2010–2018: Le Puy
- 2018–2023: Saint-Étienne
- 2023–2024: AC Milan

Senior career*
Years	Team	Apps	(Gls)
2021–2023	Saint-Étienne B	2	(0)
2022–2023	Saint-Étienne	1	(0)
2024–2025	AC Milan	0	(0)
2024–2025	Milan Futuro (res.)	14	(0)
2025–2026	Pau	22	(0)
2026–	Alverca	0	(0)

International career^{‡}
2022	France U17	2	(0)
2023	France U19	5	(0)
2024	France U20	1	(0)
Medal record
Men's football
Representing France
UEFA European Under-17 Championship
Winner	2022 Israel
- * Club domestic league appearances and goals as of 11 May 2026 ‡ National team caps and goals as of 9 September 2024

Noah Joseph Guy Raveyre (born 22 June 2005) is a French professional footballer who plays as a goalkeeper for Primeira Liga club Alverca.

== Club career ==
=== Saint-Étienne ===
Born in Le Puy-en-Velay, France, and growing up in the nearby Vals-près-le-Puy, Noah Raveyre started playing football in the local Le Puy Foot, before he joined Saint-Étienne in June 2018, a club he supported since his early childhood, as did his family.

Raveyre made his professional debut for Saint-Étienne on the 20 August 2022, coming on as a substitute in a 6–0 Ligue 2 loss against Le Havre, replacing Victor Lobry as his side was already 3–0 down, having received three red cards, including one for goalkeeper Etienne Green.

=== AC Milan ===
He moved to Italy and joined Serie A club AC Milan on a free transfer on 3 July 2023, signing a five-year contract and set to initially join the reserve team.

On 14 April 2024, Raveyre received his first call-up with the AC Milan senior team for a 3–3 away draw Serie A match against Sassuolo, as an unused substitute.

He was called-up for the 2024–25 Serie A season opener, as an unused substitute and back-up option along with fellow goalkeeper Lorenzo Torriani, on a 2–2 home draw match against Torino.

Raveyre made his debut with the newly created reserve team Milan Futuro on 26 September 2024, starting for a 2–1 home win Serie C Group B match against SPAL.

=== Pau ===
On 23 July 2025, Raveyre returned to his native France, joining the Ligue 2 club Pau, with a buy-back option for Milan in his contract. Upon his transfer, he quickly became the starting goalkeeper and played matchdays 1–13, before a concussion forced him off the pitch in the game against Troyes and had him miss the next two league games. He returned to playing on 6 December 2025, matchday 16, and kept a clean sheet against Montpellier.

=== Alverca ===
On 3 July 2026, Raveyre joined Alverca in the Portuguese top tier, signing a contract until 2030.

== International career ==
A French youth international, Raveyre was selected with France for the 2022 Under-17 Euro in April 2022. The backup goalkeeper behind Lisandru Olmeta, he only played the last group stage game, as his team won the championship against the likes of Germany, Portugal and Netherlands.

== Career statistics ==
=== Club ===
As of match played 15 March 2025

Appearances and goals by club, season and competition
Club	Season	League			Cup		Europe		Total	
Club	Season	Division	Apps	Goals	Apps	Goals	Apps	Goals	Apps	Goals
Saint-Étienne B	2021–22	Championnat National 3	1	0	—		—		1	0
Saint-Étienne B	2022–23	Championnat National 3	1	0	—		—		1	0
Saint-Étienne B	Total		2	0	—		—		2	0
Saint-Étienne	2022–23	Ligue 2	1	0	—		—		1	0
Saint-Étienne	Total		1	0	—		—		1	0
AC Milan	2023–24	Serie A	0	0	0	0	0	0	0	0
AC Milan	2024–25	Serie A	0	0	0	0	0	0	0	0
AC Milan	Total		0	0	0	0	0	0	0	0
Milan Futuro	2024–25	Serie C	14	0	0	0	—		14	0
Milan Futuro	Total		14	0	0	0	—		14	0
Career total			17	0	0	0	—		17	0

== Honours ==
AC Milan

- Supercoppa Italiana: 2024

France U17

- UEFA European Under-17 Championship: 2022
