= Tao Belabdi =

French footballer (born 2007)

Personal information
- Date of birth: 12 July 2007 (age 19)
- Place of birth: Mont-de-Marsan, France
- Position: Goalkeeper

Team information
- Current team: Pau (U-19)

Youth career
- –2022: Mont-de-Marsan
- 2022–2025: Nîmes
- 2025–: Pau

International career^{‡}
Years	Team	Apps	(Gls)
2024	Morocco U17	2	(0)
- ‡ National team caps and goals as of 22 April 2024

Tao Belabdi (Arabic: تياو بلعابدي; born 12 July 2007) is a footballer who plays as a goalkeeper for the under-19 squad of the Ligue 2 club Pau FC. Born in France, he represents Morocco internationally.

== Early and personal life ==
Tao Belabdi was born on 12 July 2007 in Mont-de-Marsan, Landes, where he attended College Victor Duruy.

== Club career ==
Tao Belabdi began his youth career at a local club in Saint-Sever, a town near Mont-de-Marsan. He then joined Stade Montois. In 2022, he joined the academy of Nîmes Olympique, where he progressed through the ranks from the U17 to the U19 level.

On 27 June 2025, Pau announced the signing of Belabdi.
