= Nicolas Delpech =

French association football player (born 2002)

Personal information
- Date of birth: 11 January 2002 (age 24)
- Place of birth: Tarbes, France
- Height: 1.80 m (5 ft 11 in)
- Position: Midfielder

Team information
- Current team: Épinal
- Number: 6

Youth career
- 2007-2021: Tarbes Pyrénées

Senior career*
Years	Team	Apps	(Gls)
2021–2022	Tarbes Pyrénées		
2022–2024	Pau B	37	(5)
2022–2024	Pau FC	1	(0)
2024–2025	Avranches	19	(1)
2025–	Épinal	9	(0)
- * Club domestic league appearances and goals as of 7 February 2026

Nicolas Delpech (born 11 January 2002) is a French professional footballer who plays as an attacking midfielder for Championnat National 1 club Épinal.

== Career ==
Born in Tarbes, Delpech joined his local football team Tarbes Pyrénées at the age of 5. Delpech made his debut for Tarbes Pyrénées first team in 2021, playing in Régional 1.

On 2022, after 15 years of playing for Tarbes Pyrénées, Delpech left the club the reserve team of Ligue 2 side Pau FC. On 2 April 2023, he made his professional debut with Pau FC first team in a 0–1 Ligue 2 loss to Le Havre.

In August 2024, Delpech joined US Avranches.

== Personal life ==
Delpech is a supporter of Ligue 1 side Toulouse FC.
