= Tom Gomes =

French footballer (born 2004)

Personal information
- Date of birth: 3 March 2004 (age 22)
- Place of birth: Châteaugay, France
- Height: 1.75 m (5 ft 9 in)
- Position: Midfielder

Team information
- Current team: Bourg-Péronnas (on loan from Pau)

Youth career
- 2015–2019: AS Montferrandaise
- 2019–2021: Nîmes

Senior career*
Years	Team	Apps	(Gls)
2022	Nîmes B	1	(0)
2023–	Pau B	43	(2)
2024–	Pau	5	(0)
2026	→ Andrézieux (loan)	8	(0)
2026–	→ Bourg-Péronnas (loan)	0	(0)
- * Club domestic league appearances and goals as of 16 May 2026

Tom Gomes (born 3 March 2004) is a French footballer who plays as a midfielder for Ligue 3 club Bourg-Péronnas on loan from Pau.

== Career ==
Gomes began playing football in Châteaugay, France. He joined the youth team of AS Montferrandaise before moving to the youth academy of Nîmes.

In 2023, Gomes signed a deal with Pau FC, initially featuring for their reserve team, alongside Thomas Colléaux.

Gomes made his first appearance with Pau FC in a Copa Pirineos preseason friendly against Huesca at Estadio El Alcoraz, replacing Mons Bassouamina.

Gomes made his Ligue 2 debut against Bordeaux at Matmut Atlantique on the last day of the 2023–24 Ligue 2 season. Coming on as a substitute for Jordy Gaspar, he provided an assist for Moussa Sylla. Pau FC suffered a narrow 3–2 defeat on that day.

At the start of the 2024–25 Ligue 2 season, Tom Gomes was added to the first-team squad. On 12 August, Gomes signed a one-year professional contract with Pau FC. Gomes was an unused substitute for the first game of the season against Clermont, at Stade Gabriel-Montpied.
