= Giovani Versini =

French footballer (born 2004)

Personal information
- Date of birth: 18 March 2004 (age 22)
- Place of birth: Marseille, France
- Height: 1.67 m (5 ft 5 1/2 in)
- Position: Winger

Team information
- Current team: Brest
- Number: 10

Youth career
- 2009–2016: Burel FC
- 2016–2021: Olympique de Marseille

Senior career*
Years	Team	Apps	(Gls)
2021–2022	Marseille B	23	(1)
2022–2024	Clermont B	33	(5)
2023–2024	→ FC Bourgoin-Jallieu (loan)	15	(1)
2024–2025	→ LB Châteauroux (loan)	26	(5)
2025–2026	Pau FC	33	(9)
2026–	Brest	3	(0)

International career^{‡}
2026–	France U21	3	(0)
- * Club domestic league appearances and goals as of 5 September 2026 ‡ National team caps and goals as of 29 September 2026

Giovani Versini (born 18 March 2004) is a French professional footballer who plays as a winger for Ligue 1 club Brest.

== Club career ==
Born in Marseille, Giovani Versini began playing football at a young age with local club Burel FC, which is known for producing talents such as Maxime Lopez and Ilan Kebbal. At the age of 12, he joined the youth academy of Olympique de Marseille, his boyhood club, where he progressed through the ranks and benefited from a structured training and educational environment. He featured for Marseille's reserve team in the Championnat National 2 during the 2021–22 season.

In 2022, Versini signed a professional contract with Clermont, leaving Marseille where he had been on a trainee contract. He made his debut with Clermont's reserve side in the Championnat National 3 and was called up once to the senior squad for a Ligue 1 match against Rennes, though he did not make an appearance. With limited first-team opportunities, he was loaned to FC Bourgoin-Jallieu in the Championnat National 2 to gain playing time.

After returning to Clermont, Versini was sidelined and trained separately from the professional group during the summer of 2024. Seeking a fresh start, he was loaned to LB Châteauroux at the end of August 2024, competing in the Championnat National, the third tier of French football.

At Châteauroux, Versini quickly established himself as a key player for manager Cris despite the club's difficult battle against relegation. His pace, technical ability, and dribbling skills made him a constant threat on the right wing. Over the course of the season, he scored 5 goals and provided 8 assists, which earned him the Revelation of the Season award in the Championnat National.

With his contract at Clermont expiring in summer 2025, Versini attracted interest from several Ligue 2 clubs. On 23 June 2025, he signed a three-year contract with Pau FC, stepping up to the second tier of French football.

On 2 September 2026, Versini signed a four-year contract with Ligue 1 club Brest. He made his top-tier debut 3 days later against Le Havre.
