= Joseph Kalulu =

French footballer (born 2004)

Personal information
- Full name: Joseph Kalulu Kyatengwa
- Date of birth: 29 November 2004 (age 21)
- Place of birth: Lyon, France
- Height: 1.80 m (5 ft 11 in)
- Position: Left-back

Team information
- Current team: Angers
- Number: 17

Youth career
- 2011–2022: Lyon
- 2022–2023: Saint Priest

Senior career*
Years	Team	Apps	(Gls)
2023–2024	Saint Priest	20	(1)
2024–2025	Pau B	11	(0)
2024–2026	Pau	59	(1)
2026–	Angers	2	(0)
- * Club domestic league appearances and goals as of 6 September 2026

Joseph Kalulu (born 29 November 2004) is a French footballer who plays as a left-back for Ligue 1 club Angers.

== Career ==
=== Early career ===
Joseph Kalulu, born in Lyon, France began his football journey at Olympique Lyonnais, where he progressed through the youth ranks from U7 to U17. In 2022, he joined the U19 team of Saint Priest and started making a name for himself on the field.

=== Saint-Priest and Pau ===
Kalulu moved to the senior squad of Saint Priest in January 2023, transitioning from the U19 team. During his first season with the senior team, he earned a regular spot, particularly filling in for the injured captain Stéphan Varsovie.

In the 2023–24 season, Kalulu made significant contributions as AS Saint-Priest achieved a notable performance in the Coupe de France, reaching the 8th finals for the first time in the club's history.

Joseph Kalulu joined Pau FC at the start of the 2024–2025 season and earned a place in the squad for Matchday 1 against Clermont, getting the nod over Jean-Lambert Evans. Originally expected to spend most of his time with the reserve team in National 3, Kalulu earned playing time, featuring in five of the first six matches of Pau FC’s 2024–25 season.

=== Angers ===
On 19 August 2026, Kalulu signed a four-year contract with Angers in Ligue 1.

== Personal life ==
Joseph Kalulu is the youngest member of the Kalulu footballing family. His brothers—Aldo, who plays for FK Partizan; Gédéon, currently with FC Lorient; and Pierre, a key player for Juventus FC—have all established successful careers in professional football. The Kalulu family, originally named Kyatengwa, is based in Saint-Fons, near Lyon.
