= Valenciennes FC =

French football club

Valenciennes
- Full name: Valenciennes Football Club
- Nicknames: VA; Les Athéniens (The Athenians)
- Short name: VAFC
- Founded: 1913; 113 years ago
- Stadium: Stade du Hainaut
- Capacity: 25,172
- Owner: Sport Republic
- President: Henrik Kraft
- Head coach: Samuel Goethals
- League: Ligue 3
- 2025–26: Championnat National, 10th of 17
- Website: www.va-fc.com
Home colours	Away colours

Valenciennes Football Club (French pronunciation: [valɑ̃sjɛn]; commonly known as Valenciennes, VA or VAFC; French pronunciation: [ve.a.ɛf.se]) is a French professional football club based in Valenciennes. The club was founded in 1914 and currently play in Ligue 3, the third tier of French football. Valenciennes plays its home matches at the recently built Stade du Hainaut located within the city.

Valenciennes was founded under the name Union Sportive de Valenciennes Anzin (USVA). The club spent over 80 years playing under the name before switching to its current name. Valenciennes has spent an almost equal amount of time playing in Ligue 1 and Ligue 2 having played 40 seasons in the first division and 36 seasons in the second division. The club has never won the first division, but has won Ligue 2 on two occasions. Valenciennes has also won the Championnat National and the Championnat de France amateur in 2005 and 1998, respectively. In 1951, the club made its first and only appearance in a Coupe de France final.

From 2004 to 2011, Valenciennes was presided over by Francis Decourrière, a former politician who served as a Member of the European Parliament under the Social Democratic Party from 1994 to 1999 and later the Union pour la Démocratie Française (Union for French Democracy) from 1999 to 2004. In 2011, Decourrière left the position and was replaced by Jean-Raymond Legrand.

== History ==
Valenciennes Football Club was founded in 1913 by a group of young men known by surnames Colson, Joly, and Bouly. Due to the club having limited resources and its formation coinciding with the onset of World War I, Valenciennes sought a consolidation between locals clubs in the city. The merger was completed in 1916 with the club changing its name to Union Sportive de Valenciennes Anzin (USVA) in the process. Following the merger, the new club spent the ensuing 15 years playing the District de l'Escaut Championship. In July 1930, the National Council of the French Football Federation voted 128–20 in support of professionalism in French football. Valenciennes, under the leadership of president M. Le Mithouard, achieved professionalism in 1933 and were inserted into the second division. The club, subsequently, became a founding member of the second division of French football.

In the second division's inaugural season, Valenciennes finished in 7th place in its group. In the following season, the league table was converted into a single table and Valenciennes finished in 2nd-place position earning promotion to Division 1 as a result. During this period, the club was notably led by foreign players such as Englishmen Peter O'Dowd and George Gibson and the German-born attackers Édouard Waggi and Ignace Kowalczyk. In the club's first season in Division 1, Valenciennes finished 15th place falling back to Division 2. The club finished equal on points with Red Star Olympique, but due to having less wins and a lesser goal difference, Valenciennes were relegated. After suffering relegation, the club brought in a new president known by the surname of Turbot. Soon after arriving, Turbot released several of the club's international players and brought in the likes of Ernest Libérati to replace them. The transition was a success with the club earning promotion back to Division 1 in 1937. However, Valenciennes stint back in Division 1 was the equivalent of its first. The club finished in last place in the 1937–38 season and relegated back to Division 2. Due to World War II, Valenciennes reverted to amateur status and spent three of the six seasons in wartime playing amateur league football.

After the war, Valenciennes turned professional again and were back in the second division. The club spent a decade in Division 2 before earning promotion the top-flight ahead of the 1956–57 season. Under manager Charles Demeillez, in 1951, Valenciennes reached the final of the Coupe de France. In the final, the club faced Strasbourg and were humbled 3–0 at the Stade Olympique Yves-du-Manoir in the Colombes. In the club's return to Division 1, Valenciennes finished in the latter part of the table for three consecutive seasons. In 1959, Valenciennes reached the final of the Coupe Drago, but were defeated 3–2 in extra time by Lens at the Parc des Princes. In the 1959–60 season, Valenciennes achieved its best finish in Division 1 after finishing 8th in the table. However, manager Robert Domergue was unable to keep the consistency as Valenciennes finished 19th in the following season. Valenciennes, now being led by youngsters Bolec Kocik and Serge Masnaghetti, achieved promotion back to Division 1 after one season and spent the next nine years playing in Division 1. During the stint, Domergue led to club to its highest finish ever in the first division when the club finished 3rd in back-to-back seasons in 1965 and 1966. After the 1966 season, Domergue departed the club and he was replaced by Gaby Robert. Neither Robert or his successor Louis Provelli could match the consistency of Domergue and he returned to the club in 1970. In the club's first season back, Domergue led the club to relegation in 1971, got the club promoted back to the first division in 1972, and coached the club to relegation again in 1973. He departed after the season and was replaced by Jean-Pierre Destrumelle.

After spending the early 1970s hovering between top flight and the second division, Destrumelle led the club back to Division 1 for the 1975–76 season. The manager had vast majority of talent in the club, most notably Bruno Metsu, Bruno Zaremba, Dominique Dropsy, and Didier Six and kept the club in the first division for his entire campaign, however, after finishing in 18th place in 1979, Dustremelle was fired and replaced by the combination of Erwin Wilczek and Bolek Tomowski. Under the duo, Valenciennes lasted in Division 1 until the 1983 season. The club, subsequently, spent the next decade playing in Division 2 under five different managers, which led supporters to slowly become disassociated with the club.

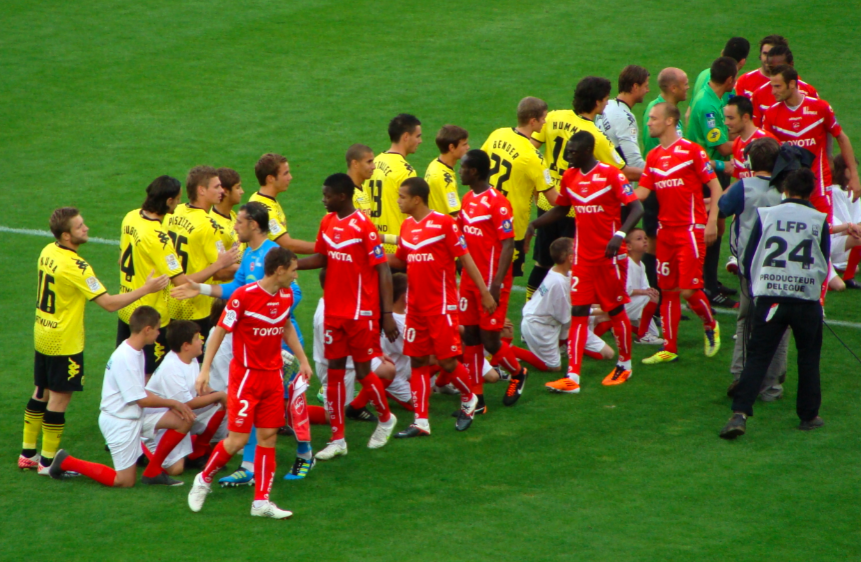
Valenciennes FC against Borussia Dortmund in 2011

From 1988 to 1991, Valenciennes improved significantly under manager Georges Peyroche. Peyroche left the club in 1991 and Francis Smerecki was named as his replacement. In Smerecki's first season, he led the club back to Division 1. In the club's first season back, Valenciennes were involved in a bribing scandal that effectively dismantled the club for the next decade. The scandal, which involved Marseille midfielder Jean-Jacques Eydelie and the club's general manager under the advisement of club chairman Bernard Tapie bribing Valenciennes players Christophe Robert, Jacques Glassmann, and Jorge Burruchaga, became headline news mainly due to Marseille being the most popular club in the country. It was asserted that the bribe was made in order for Valenciennes players to "take it easy" on Marseille players with the latter club having to play in the 1993 UEFA Champions League Final against Italian club Milan just days later. Marseille beat Valenciennes 1–0 and went on to defeat Milan to become the first French club to win the European competition. After the plot was discovered, Robert admitted to accepting the bribe, Burruchaga admitted to initially agreeing to it, but later changing his mind, while Glassmann said he never agreed to the deal. The subsequent reports of the scandal completely tarnished the Valenciennes's image and several players departed the club amid embarrassment and speculation that they were also involved in the plot. With the club now playing in Ligue 2, Valenciennes was unable to cope with the damage instilled on it due to the scandal and finished last in the league, thus falling to the third division for the first time in the club's lifetime. Two seasons later, the club was relegated to the fourth division due to financial problems. Ahead of the 1996–97 season, the club dropped to amateur status after filing for bankruptcy.

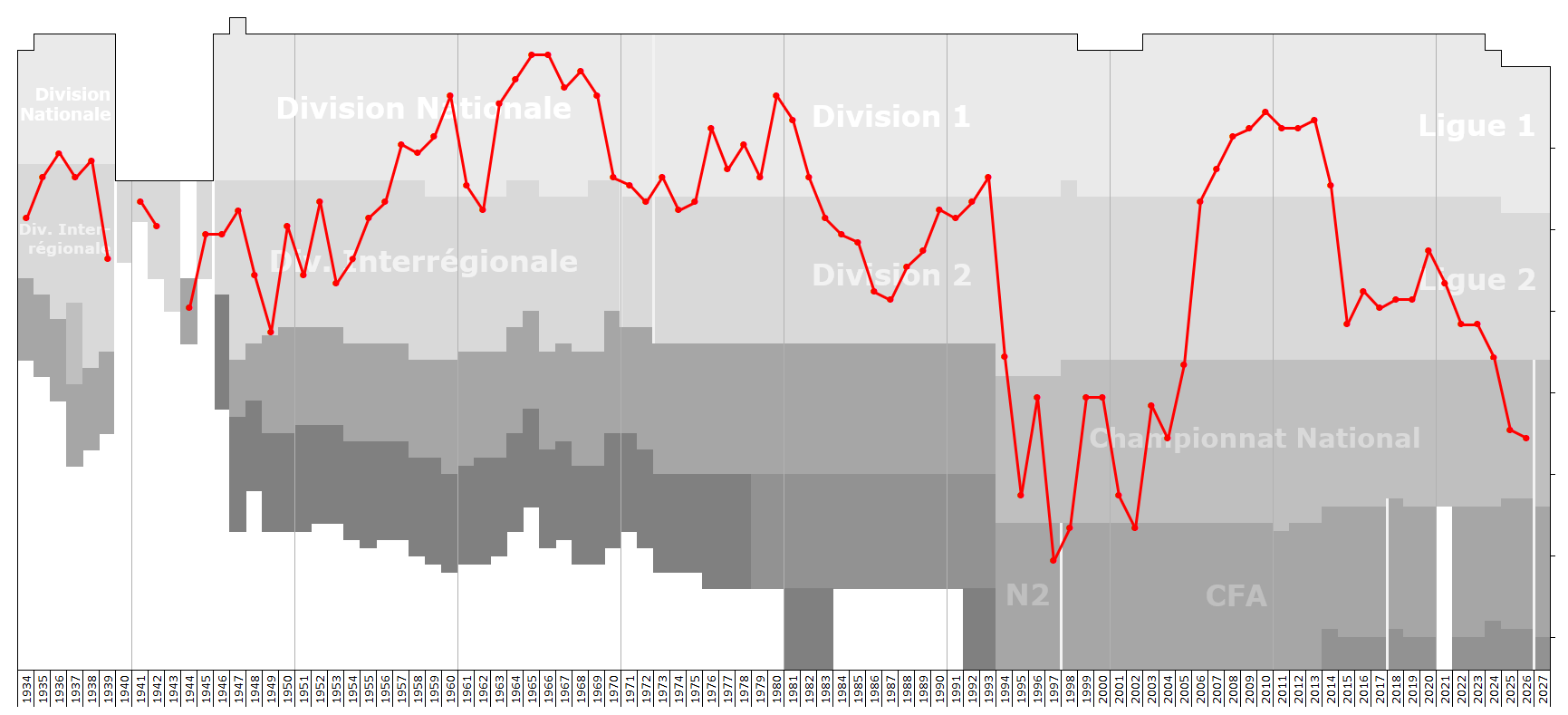
Historical league performance chart of Valenciennes FC

On 1 April 1996, the club was renamed Valenciennes Football Club and finished in fifth place in its inaugural campaign under the name. In the following season, the fourth division was renamed to the Championnat de France amateur and Valenciennes became inaugural champions of the league. Over the next seven seasons, Valenciennes played in the Championnat National, excluding one season back in the CFA. In the 2004–05 season, the club won National and returned to the second division, now called Ligue 2. After one season, Valenciennes earned promotion back to the first division, now called Ligue 1, under the leadership of Antoine Kombouaré. After eight years in Ligue 1, the club was relegated to the second division in 2014. Because of this relegation, VAFC experienced financial problems and saw the return to the business of the former minister Jean-Louis Borloo. He saved the club from demotion to the fourth division.

With six games left to play, Valenciennes were relegated back to Championnat National in the 2023–24 Ligue 2 season, following a 4–1 defeat to Pau FC on 13 April 2024, ending a 19-year spell in the professional leagues.

== Purchase by Sport Republic ==
After the club held on to its title at the last minute on the final day of the season, rumours of a sale resurfaced. On 16 June 2023, the management published a press release announcing that "the club's majority shareholders had entered into exclusive negotiations with Sport Republic, a London-based sports investment company and majority shareholder in English football club Southampton FC and Turkish football club Göztepe SK, with a view to investing in the club's economic and sporting development "64. On 13 July 2023, following two general meetings, the sale of the club was completed.

== Players ==
=== Current squad ===
As of 6 September 2026

Note: Flags indicate national team as defined under FIFA eligibility rules; some limited exceptions apply. Players may hold more than one non-FIFA nationality.

No.	Pos.	Nation	Player
1	GK	FRA	Jean Louchet
2	DF	ENG	Derrick Abu
4	DF	FRA	Nolann Bourichon
5	DF	CGO	Bryan Passi
6	DF	FRA	Maël Zogba
7	FW	TOG	Charles Abi
8	MF	FRA	Mabrouk Rouaï
9	MF	UAE	Junior Ndiaye (on loan from Montpellier)
10	MF	FRA	Daou Diomandé
11	FW	FRA	Rayane Ekra
13	DF	FRA	Christopher Rocchia
14	FW	CMR	Célestin Nyemb
17	DF	FRA	Noam Blé

No.	Pos.	Nation	Player
18	FW	FRA	Gaëtan Courtet
19	MF	FRA	Thibault Maréchal
20	DF	FRA	Abou Meïté
21	MF	FRA	Vincent Marcel
22	DF	FRA	Danny Goprou
23	FW	FRA	Kylian Kouakou
24	MF	FRA	Salif Lebouath
25	MF	FRA	Samir Belloumou
26	MF	CAN	Luka Boiteau
27	FW	COM	Zaïd Amir
28	DF	MAR	Abdelwahed Wahib
40	GK	FRA	Justin Lacombe
—	MF	MLI	Issa Tounkara (on loan from Southampton)

=== Out on loan ===
Note: Flags indicate national team as defined under FIFA eligibility rules; some limited exceptions apply. Players may hold more than one non-FIFA nationality.

No.	Pos.	Nation	Player
—	DF	CAN	Erin Airhiavbere (at Granville until 30 June 2027)

=== Notable players ===
Below are the notable former players who have represented Valenciennes in league and international competition since the club's foundation in 1913.

For a complete list of Valenciennes players, see Category:Valenciennes FC players.

- (Republic of Ireland) Noel King
- (Algeria) Nourredine Kourichi
- (Argentina) Jorge Burruchaga
- (Austria) Wolfgang Matzky
- (Bosnia and Herzegovina) Ivica Osim
- (Cameroon) Eugène Ekéké
- (Cameroon) Roger Milla
- (Cameroon) Joseph Yegba Maya
- (Colombia) Carlos Sanchez
- (Democratic Republic of the Congo) Arthur Masuaku
- (France) Johan Audel
- (France) Joseph Bonnel
- (France) Jean-Claude Bras
- (France) Bernard Chiarelli
- (France) Renaud Cohade
- (France) Dominique Corroyer
- (France) Gaël Danic
- (France) Léon Desmenez
- (France) Jean-Claude Darcheville
- (France) David Ducourtioux
- (France) Laurent Dufresne
- (France) Jacky Duguépéroux
- (France) Dominique Dropsy
- (France) Jean-Luc Fugaldi
- (France) Jérôme Foulon
- (France) Francis Gillot
- (France) Jacques Glassmann
- (France) Wilfried Gohel
- (France) Jean-Pierre Guinot
- (France) Bolec Kocik
- (France) Hocine Lachaab
- (France) Thierry Laurey
- (France) Daniel Leclercq
- (France) Joseph Magiera
- (France) Serge Masnaghetti
- (France) Rudy Mater
- (France) Bruno Metsu
- (France) Daniel Moreira
- (France) Jean-Pierre Papin
- (France) Nicolas Penneteau
- (France) Jean-Claude Piumi
- (France) Louis Provelli
- (France) Grégory Pujol
- (France) José Saez
- (France) Steve Savidan
- (France) Orlando Silvestri
- (France) Didier Six
- (France) Bruno Zaremba
- (France) Pascal Zaremba
- (Ivory Coast) Siaka Tiéné
- (Mali) Éric Chelle
- (Netherlands) Petrus Van Rhijn
- (Poland) Włodzimierz Lubański
- (Poland) Erwin Wilczek
- (Serbia) Milan Biševac
- (United States) David Régis

== Management and staff ==
=== Club officials ===
Valenciennes Football Club (SASP)

- President: Henrik Kraft
- Association president: Sébastien Dhollande
- General director: Yoann Godin

Coaching and medical staff

- Manager: Ahmed Kantari

Youth coaching staff

- Youth academy director: Simon Raux

=== Coaching history ===
- (England) Charles Griffiths (1933 - 1935)
- (Hungary) Peter Fabian (1935 - 1938)
- (France) Charles Demeillez (1938)
- (France) Pierre Parmentier (1938 - 1946)
- (England) Arthur Plummer (1946 - 1947)
- (France) Pierre Parmentier (1947 - 1948)
- (France) André Tison (1948 - November 1950)
- (France) Henri Pérus (November 1950 – 1953)
- (France) Charles Demeillez (1951 – 1953)
- (France) Robert Domergue (1953 – 1966)
- (France) Gaby Robert (1966 – 1970)
- (France) Louis Provelli (1970)
- (France) Robert Domergue (1970 – 1972)
- (France) Jean-Pierre Destrumelle (1972 – 1979)
- (Poland) Wilczek and (France) Tempowski (1979 – 1982)
- (Poland) Erwin Wilczek (1982)
- (France) Léon Desmenez (1982 – 1986)
- (France) Daniel Leclercq (1986 – 1987)
- (France) Victor Zvunka (1987 – 1988)
- (France) Georges Peyroche (1988 – 1991)
- (France) Francis Smerecki (1991 – 1992)
- (Bosnia and Herzegovina) Boro Primorac (1992 – 1993)
- (France) Bruno Metsu (1993 – 1994)
- (France) Robert Dewilder (1994 – April 1996)
- (France) Dominique Corroyer (April 1996 – June 1996)
- (France) Ludovic Batelli (1996 – 2000)
- (France) Didier Ollé-Nicolle (2000 – June 2003)
- (France) Daniel Leclercq (June 2003 – July 2005)
- (New Caledonia) Antoine Kombouaré (July 2005 – June 2009)
- (France) Philippe Montanier (June 2009 – June 2011)
- (France) Daniel Sanchez (June 2011 – October 2013)
- (Belgium) Ariël Jacobs (October 2013 – July 2014)
- (France) Bernard Casoni (July 2014 – February 2015)
- (France) David Le Frapper (Feb. 2015 – Dec. 2015)
- (France) Nicolas Rabuel (January 2016)
- (Bosnia and Herzegovina) Faruk Hadzibegic (Jan. 2016 – Sep. 2017)
- (France) Nicolas Rabuel (Oct. 2017 – Nov. 2017)
- (France) Réginald Ray (Nov. 2017 – June 2019)
- (France) Olivier Guégan (June 2019 – Nov. 2021)
- (France) Christophe Delmotte (Nov. 2021 – June 2022)
- (France) Nicolas Rabuel (July 2022 – April 2023)
- (Morocco) Ahmed Kantari (April 2023 – June 2023)
- (Portugal) Jorge Maciel (July 2023 – Dec. 2023)
- (Morocco) Ahmed Kantari (Dec. 2023 – Nov. 2024)
- (France) Stéphane Mangione (Nov. 2024 – Dec. 2024)
- (France) Vincent Hognon (Dec. 2024 – June 2025)
- (France) Stéphane Moulin (July 2025 – )

== Honours ==
- Ligue 2
  - Champions (2): 1971-72, 2005-06
- Championnat National
  - Champions (1): 2004-05
- Championnat de France amateur
  - Champions (1): 1997-98
- Coupe de France
  - Runners-up (1): 1951
- Coupe Charles Drago
  - Runners-up (1): 1959
