= Thomas Colléaux =

French footballer (born 2005)

Personal information
- Date of birth: 18 April 2005 (age 21)
- Place of birth: Saint-Grégoire, France
- Position: Midfielder

Team information
- Current team: Pau FC
- Number: 33

Youth career
- Chartres De Bretagne
- Stade Rennais
- TA Rennes
- Stade Brestois 29

Senior career*
Years	Team	Apps	(Gls)
2022–2023	Brest B	1	(0)
2023–2024	Pau FC	5	(0)
2023–2024	Pau II	19	(0)
2024–	Lorient B	0	(0)
- * Club domestic league appearances and goals as of 15 June 2024

Thomas Colléaux (born 18 April 2005) is a French professional footballer who plays as a midfielder for Ligue 1 club FC Lorient.

== Career ==
Thomas Colléaux is a youth product of Stade Brestois 29.

In July 2023, Colléaux departed from Brest for Pau FC. He made his professional debut with Pau in a 2–0 Ligue 2 loss against AC Ajaccio on 21 October 2023.

In August 2024, he moved back to Brittany, joining Lorient B.

== Personal life ==
Born in Rennes, Colléaux became a member of various youth clubs in Brittany, including Espérance de Chartres de Bretagne, Stade Rennais, and TA Rennes, before finally gaining entry into the academy at Stade Brestois 29.
