= Rayan Touzghar =

Moroccan footballer (born 2006)

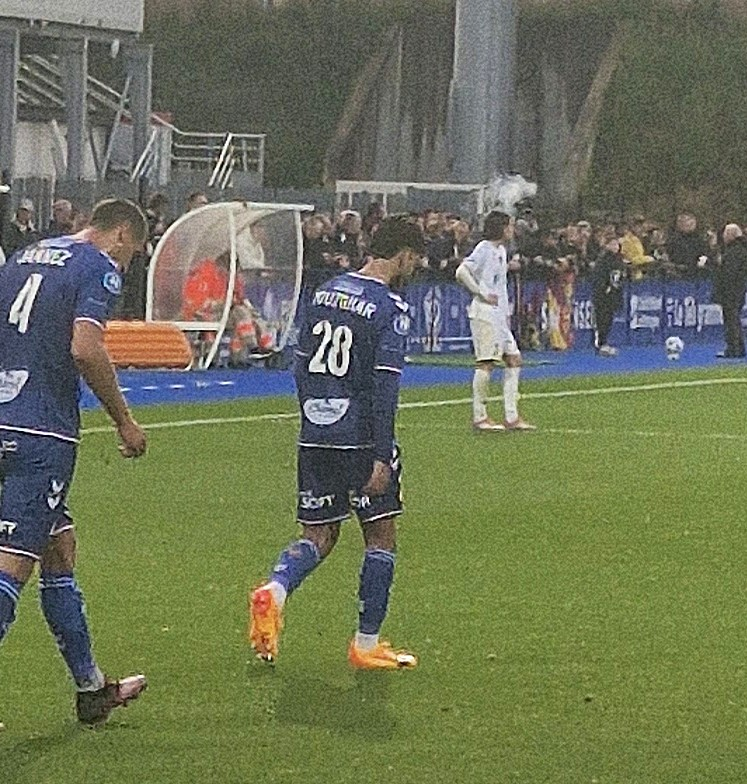
- Touzghar with Concarneau in 2025

Personal information
- Date of birth: 27 October 2003 (age 23)
- Place of birth: Avignon, France
- Height: 1.82 m (6 ft 0 in)
- Position: Midfielder

Team information
- Current team: Standard Liège
- Number: 84

Youth career
- 2010–2016: Avignon
- 2016: SC Orange
- 2016–2017: Avignon
- 2017–2019: US Le Pontet
- 2019–2020: Marignane Gignac
- 2020–2021: Nîmes

Senior career*
Years	Team	Apps	(Gls)
2021–2023	Toulouse II	20	(4)
2023–2025	Guingamp II	26	(3)
2024–2025	Guingamp	4	(1)
2025	→ Concarneau (loan)	13	(4)
2025–2026	Pau FC	33	(3)
2026–	Standard Liège	0	(0)

International career^{‡}
2022	Morocco U20	2	(0)
- * Club domestic league appearances and goals as of 11 May 2026 ‡ National team caps and goals as of 19:20, 11 August 2025 (UTC)

Rayan Touzghar (Arabic: ريان توزغار; born 27 October 2003) is a professional football player who plays as a midfielder for Belgian Pro League club Standard Liège. Born in France, he is a youth international for Morocco.

== Career ==
Touzghar is a product of the youth academies of the French clubs Avignon, SC Orange, US Le Pontet, Marignane Gignac and Nîmes. In 2021, he transferred to Toulouse where he played for their reserves. In the summer of 2023, he moved to the reserves of Guingamp. On 2 February 2024, he signed a professional contract with the senior Guingamp team for 2 seasons where he made his first appearances in the Ligue 2. On 31 January 2025, he joined Concarneau on loan in the Championnat National.

On 1 August 2025, Touzghar transferred to Pau FC in the Ligue 2 on a 2-year contract.

On 17 July 2026, Touzghar signed a three-year contract, with an optional fourth year, with Belgian Pro League club Standard Liège.

== International career ==
Born in France, both of Touzghar's parents are Moroccan. He made 2 appearances for the Morocco U20s in 2022.

== Personal life ==
Touzghar is the younger half-brother of the professional footballer Yoann Touzghar.
