= Tao Paradowski =

French footballer (born 2005)

Personal information
- Date of birth: 15 January 2005 (age 21)
- Place of birth: Saint-Paul, Réunion, France
- Height: 1.80 m (5 ft 11 in)
- Position: Goalkeeper

Team information
- Current team: Ibiza
- Number: 13

Youth career
- 2010–2014: Jarville
- 2014–2022: Nancy

Senior career*
Years	Team	Apps	(Gls)
2022–2023	Nîmes B	20	(0)
2023–2024	Nîmes	29	(0)
2024–2026	Pau	2	(0)
2024–2026	Pau B	28	(0)
2026–	Ibiza	4	(0)
- * Club domestic league appearances and goals as of 10 June 2026

Tao Paradowski (born 15 January 2005) is a French professional footballer who plays as a goalkeeper for Spanish Primera Federación club Ibiza.

== Club career ==
=== Early career ===
Tao Paradowski was born in Saint-Paul, Réunion on 15 January 2005. He was named after Tao, one of the main characters from the animated series The Mysterious Cities of Gold, a favorite of his parents. Paradowski began his football journey at a young age with Jarville JF, before joining the youth system of AS Nancy Lorraine in 2014. Despite facing criticism about his height, Paradowski remained determined, drawing inspiration from role models like Jordan Pickford.

=== Nîmes Olympique ===
In the summer of 2022, Paradowski joined Nîmes on trial and impressed the coaches, leading to a promotion to the senior squad. He debuted in the Championnat National in September 2023 and quickly became a key player, earning recognition for his performances.

Paradowski's notable performances include a standout display with 9 saves in a match against US Orléans, where he played a crucial role in securing a 1–0 victory despite the team facing a high expected goals (xG) score against them.

=== Pau FC ===
In August 2024, Paradowski signed with Pau, marking a move to Ligue 2. He was keen to continue working with Anthony Babikian, who was the goalkeeper coach at Nîmes and joined Pau at the beginning of the 2024–25 Ligue 2 season. Paradowski's transfer follows a promising season with Nîmes, where he established himself as a reliable goalkeeper.

=== Ibiza ===
On 2 February 2026, Paradowski moved to Ibiza in the Spanish third-tier Primera Federación.

== International career ==
In March 2024, Bernard Diomède included Paradowski in the France U19 squad for friendlies against Uzbekistan. Despite being part of the squad, he did not play in either of the matches. In September 2025, he was selected in the France U20 squad for the 2025 FIFA U-20 World Cup in Chile.

== Personal life ==
Outside of football, Paradowski is a devout Catholic, his faith plays a significant role in his life, providing him with grounding and focus. He is of Polish descent.
