= Fidèle Bongelo =

French-Congolese footballer (born 2006)

Personal information
- Full name: Fidèle Malcolm Bongelo
- Date of birth: 20 March 2006 (age 20)
- Place of birth: Toulouse, France
- Height: 1.83 m (6 ft 0 in)
- Position: Forward

Team information
- Current team: Pau B

Youth career
- 2016–2021: US Colomiers
- 2021–2022: Montpellier

Senior career*
Years	Team	Apps	(Gls)
2022–2023	Montpellier B	1	(0)
2024–	Pau B	12	(0)
2024	Pau	1	(0)
- * Club domestic league appearances and goals as of 6 September 2025

Fidèle Malcolm Bongelo (born 20 March 2006) is a French professional footballer who plays as a forward for Championnat National 3 club Pau B.

== Club career ==
=== Early career ===
Fidèle Bongelo was born in Toulouse on 20 March 2006. He began his football journey at US Colomiers, where he quickly stood out for his speed, dribbling, and especially his finishing ability. His performances caught the attention of Montpellier, leading to his move to the club in the summer of 2021 as part of a partnership between the two clubs.

At Montpellier, Bongelo continued to develop his reputation as a clinical striker. In the 2021–2022 season, he scored 11 goals and provided 6 assists in just 13 matches with the U17 team, demonstrating his knack for finding the back of the net. His performances were so impressive that he was occasionally promoted to play with the U19 team, despite being just 17 years old.

=== Pau FC ===
At the beginning of the 2024–25 season, Bongelo joined Pau FC, in Ligue 2. He made his professional debut in a dramatic match against SM Caen, where Pau secured a hard-fought 1–0 victory despite being reduced to nine men.
