= FC Bassin d'Arcachon =

French football club

- Nickname(s): FCBA
- Founded: 1923
- Ground: Stade Jean Brousse; Arcachon, Gironde
- Capacity: 1,000
- Chairman: Yves Jablonski
- Manager: Gauthier Mesplé & Eric Aldeguer
- League: Regional 1 Nouvelle Aquitaine
- 2019–20: National 3 Group A, 14th (relegated)
- Website: https://www.fcbarcachon.com
Home colours

Football Club Bassin d'Arcachon Sud is a French association football club founded in 1923. They are based in Arcachon, Gironde and as of the 2020–21 season they play in the Régional 1, the sixth tier in the French football league system. They play at the Stade Jean Brousse in Arcachon.

== History ==
On 3 June 2003, Bassin d'Arcachon merged with a local side, FC Gujan-Mestras, then with La Teste Fc in 2014, to form the club that exists today. Their first manager in this era was the legendary Frenchman Jean-Pierre Papin, who contributed to the club's promotion to CFA 2 in 2005, before leaving to manage Ligue 1 side RC Strasbourg Alsace. He made his return in 2014 with the club in Championnat de France Amateur 2.

Notable players

- Enzo Derouin — A promising left-back, Derouin joined FC Bassin d'Arcachon in 2024 as the club competed in Championnat National 3. During the 2024–25 season, he made 23 appearances, scoring one goal and providing two assists. His performances at FCBA earned him a transfer to Pau FC in Ligue 2 in June 2025.

== Coaching staff ==
- Head coach: (France) Steeve Savidan
- Assistant coach: (France) Gauthier Mesple
