= 2024–25 Red Star F.C. season =

Red Star F.C.
2024–25 season
- Manager: Grégory Poirier
- Stadium: Stade Bauer
- Ligue 2: 15th
- Coupe de France: Eighth round
- Top goalscorer: League: Aliou Badji (6); All: Aliou Badji (6)
- All statistics correct as of 21 February 2025.

The 2024–25 season is the 128th season in the history of the Red Star F.C. In addition to the domestic league, the team will participate in the Coupe de France.

== Transfers ==
=== In ===
Pos.	Player	Transferred from	Fee	Date	Source
MF	(Martinique) Samuel Renel	(France) Niort	Free	1 July 2024	
DF	(France) Bradley Danger	(France) Rodez AF	Free	9 July 2024	

== Friendlies ==
=== Pre-season ===
12 July 2024 Friendly	Lens (France)	6–0	(France) Red Star	Billy-Montigny
12:15	Wahi 6', 15', 24'; Saïd 55'; Guilavogui 76'; Fulgini 85'			Stadium: Stade Paul Guerre
Note: Behind closed doors

20 July 2024 Friendly	FC Nantes II (France)	1–2	(France) Red Star
15:00	34'		Ifnaoui 42'; Anani 71'

26 July 2024 Friendly	RAAL La Louvière (Belgium)	2–1	(France) Red Star
19:00	Belkheir 17'; Gobitaka 76'		Camara 87'

27 July 2024 Friendly	Zulte Waregem (Belgium)	2–2	(France) Red Star
15:00	26'; 59'; (red card) 90'		27'; 45+1'; (red card) 90'

2 August 2024 Friendly	Red Star (France)	2–1	(France) Rouen
12:00

3 August 2024 Friendly	AJ Auxerre (France)	2–0	(France) Red Star
18:00	Perrin 65'; Viadère 71'

== Competitions ==
=== Overall record ===
Competition	First match	Last match	Starting round	Record							
Competition	First match	Last match	Starting round	Pld	W	D	L	GF	GA	GD	Win %
Ligue 2	16–18 August 2024	10 May 2025	Matchday 1	0	0	0	0	0	0	+0	—
Coupe de France				0	0	0	0	0	0	+0	—
Total				0	0	0	0	0	0	+0	—

Source: Soccerway

=== Ligue 2 ===
==== League table ====
Pos	Team	Pld	W	D	L	GF	GA	GD	Pts	Promotion or Relegation
13	Pau	34	10	12	12	39	53	−14	42	
14	Rodez	34	9	12	13	56	54	+2	39	
15	Red Star	34	9	11	14	37	51	−14	38	
16	Clermont (O)	34	7	12	15	30	46	−16	33	Qualification for relegation play-offs
17	Martigues (Note: Martigues were originally going to be relegated to Régional 1 as the DNCG excluded them from national competitions. However, Martigues were then relegated further down to Départemental 1, the ninth tier of French football, before eventually getting relegated once again down to Départemental 3, the eleventh tier) (D, R)	34	9	5	20	29	56	−27	32	Administrative relegation to Départemental 3

Source: Ligue 2
Rules for classification: 1) Points; 2) Goal difference; 3) Number of goals scored; 4) Head-to-head goal difference; 5) Fair play points
(D) Disqualified; (O) Play-off winners; (R) Relegated

==== Results summary ====
Overall								Home						Away					
Pld	W	D	L	GF	GA	GD	Pts	W	D	L	GF	GA	GD	W	D	L	GF	GA	GD
0	0	0	0	0	0	0	0	0	0	0	0	0	0	0	0	0	0	0	0

==== Results by round ====
Round	1
Ground	A
Result	
Position	

A = Away; H = Home; W = Win; D = Draw; L = Loss

==== Matches ====
The match schedule was released on 21 June 2024.

16 August 2024 1	Amiens SC	3-0	Red Star	Amiens
20:00 CEST	Urhoghide 43'; Mafouta 46'; Kaïboué (yellow card) 49'; Leautey 57'	Report		Stadium: Stade de la Licorne; Attendance: 4,918; Referee: (France) Eddy Rosier

26 August 2024 2	Red Star	1-0	Ajaccio	Paris
20:45 CEST	Renel 4'; Kouagba (yellow card) 90'; Badji (yellow card) 90+2'	Report	Vidal (yellow card) 90'; Ayessa (yellow card) 90+1'; Sollacaro (yellow card) 90+2'	Stadium: Stade Bauer; Attendance: 4,560; Referee: (France) Thierry Bouille

30 August 2024 3	Guingamp	3-4	Red Star	Guingamp
20:00 CEST	Hemia 23' 45+1'; Labeau 78'	Report	Badji 3' 52'; Kouagba (yellow card) 26'; Danger 41' (pen.); Durand 60'	Stadium: Stade de Roudourou; Attendance: 7,872; Referee: (France) Robin Chapapria

13 September 2024 4	Lorient	2-1	Red Star	Lorient
20:00 CEST	Katseris 12'; Soumano 77' (pen.); Abergel (yellow card) 79'; Talbi (yellow card) 82'	Report	Benali (yellow card) 45+17'; Ifnaoui 47'; Badji (yellow card) 48'; Mbock (red card) 88'	Stadium: Stade du Moustoir - Yves Allainmat; Attendance: 5,748; Referee: (France) Pierre Legat

20 September 2024 5	Red Star	0-3	Laval	Paris
20:00 CEST	Escartin (yellow card) 20'; El Hriti (yellow card) 80'	Report	Sellouki 15' 37' 69'; Camara (yellow card) 44'	Stadium: Stade Bauer; Attendance: 4,593; Referee: (France) Eddy Rosier

24 September 2024 6	Clermont	1-1	Red Star	Clermont-Ferrand
20:30 CEST	Baaloudj 10'; Konaté (yellow card) 20'; Allan Ackra (yellow card) 82'	Report	Cissé (yellow card) 30'; Benali 65'	Stadium: Stade Gabriel-Montpied; Attendance: 6,000; Referee: (France) Ahmed Taleb

28 September 2024 7	Red Star	1-3	Paris FC	Paris
14:00 CEST	Hachem (yellow card) 19'; Doucouré 32'; Beunardeau (yellow card) 45'; Mendy (yellow card) 76'	Report	Camara 20' (yellow card) 53'; Kolodziejczak (yellow card) 26'; Krasso 45+1' (pen.) 57'	Stadium: Stade Bauer; Attendance: 4,560; Referee: (France) Mikael Lesage

4 October 2024 8	Annecy	1-0	Red Star	Annecy
20:00 CET	Hamjatou Soukouna 84'	Report	Durivaux (yellow card) 56'; Mendy (yellow card) 73'; Durand (yellow card) 90+5'	Stadium: Parc des Sports; Attendance: 5,181; Referee: (France) Olivier Thual

18 October 2024 9	Red Star	2-2	Caen	Paris
20:00 CET	Durand (yellow card) 45+1' (goal) 81'; Hachem 65'; Benali (yellow card) 90+4'	Report	Lebreton 11'; Henry (yellow card) 43'; Gomis 63'	Stadium: Stade Bauer; Attendance: 4,643; Referee: (France) Pierre Gaillouste

25 October 2024 10	Dunkerque	2-0	Red Star	Dunkerque
20:00 CET	Opa Sanganté 31'; Skyttä 63'	Report	Hachem (yellow card) 15'; Doucouré (yellow card) 69'	Stadium: Stade Marcel-Tribut; Attendance: 4,605; Referee: (France) Mikael Lesage

29 October 2024 11	Red Star	1-0	Metz	Paris
20:30 CET	Escartin (yellow card) 13'; Oukidja 47' (o.g.); Doucouré (yellow card) 73'	Report	Jallow (yellow card) 23'	Stadium: Stade Bauer; Attendance: 4,643; Referee: (France) Robin Chapapria

1 November 2024 12	Martigues	0-1	Red Star	Gueugnon
20:00 CET	Saintini (yellow card) 56'; Solvet (yellow card) 90+5' (yellow-red card) 90+7'	Report	Hachem (yellow card) 57'; Benali 90+8' (pen.)	Stadium: Stade Jean Laville; Attendance: 532; Referee: (France) Aurélien Petit

8 November 2024 13	Red Star	0-3	Troyes	Paris
20:00 CET	Ifnaoui (yellow card) 56'; Kouagba (yellow card) 68'; Mbock (yellow card) 79'	Report	Ripart 45+1'; Houboulang Mendes (yellow card) 55'; Abdoulaye Kanté (yellow card) 76'; Assoumou 89'; Dong 90+3'	Stadium: Stade Bauer; Attendance: 4,552; Referee: (France) Rémi Landry

22 November 2024 14	Pau	4-1	Red Star	Bizanos
20:00 CET	Mboup 11' 77'; Koudou (yellow card) 63'; Ngom 79'; Diawara 90+6' (pen.)	Report	Eickmayer 14'; Badji (yellow card) 85'	Stadium: Nouste Camp; Attendance: 2,887; Referee: (France) Geoffrey Kubler

=== Coupe de France ===
16 November 2024 Round 7	Haubourdin	1-7	Red Star	Croix
15:00 CET	Ibrahim Diene 16'	Report	Cissé 15'; Escartin 34'; Donovan Corailler 45+1' (o.g.); Botella 49' 74'; Renel 71'; Ifnaoui 88'	Stadium: Stade Henri Seigneur; Attendance: 1,225; Referee: (France) Anthony Ustaritz

30 November 2024 Round 8	FC 93	2-2 (4-2 p)	Red Star	Bobigny
14:30 CET	Lassana Konté 30' (yellow card) 78'; Sayan Keita 49'; Reda Kaddouri (yellow card) 90+1'	Report	Escartin (yellow card) 30'; Hachem 45'; Durivaux 90+4'	Stadium: Stade Auguste Delaune; Attendance: 1,500; Referee: (France) Robin Chapapria
