= 2023–24 AS Nancy Lorraine season =

AS Nancy Lorraine
2023–24 season
- Chairman: Nicolas Holveck
- Manager: Benoît Pedretti (until 15 November); Pablo Correa (from 18 November)
- Stadium: Stade Marcel Picot
- Championnat National: 5th
- Coupe de France: Fifth round
- Top goalscorer: League: Cheikh Touré (8); All: Cheikh Touré (8)

2023–24 AS Nancy Lorraine season is the club's 58th season in history and its second consecutive season in the third division of French football, the Championnat National. They also took part in the Coupe de France, entering from the fifth round.

== Players ==
=== First-team-squad ===
As of 1 February 2024

Note: Flags indicate national team as defined under FIFA eligibility rules; some limited exceptions apply. Players may hold more than one non-FIFA nationality.

No.	Pos.	Nation	Player
3	DF	FRA	Gwilhem Tayot
4	DF	MLI	Alassane Diaby
5	MF	FRA	Maxime Nonnenmacher
6	MF	FRA	Teddy Bouriaud
7	MF	FRA	Benjamin Gomel
8	FW	FRA	Walid Bouabdeli
9	FW	FRA	Cheikh Touré
10	FW	GLP	Lenny Nangis
11	MF	SEN	Mamadou Camara (on loan from Lens)
13	FW	NGR	Okardi Inikurogha
15	DF	SEN	Prince Mendy
16	GK	FRA	Martin Sourzac
17	DF	FRA	Maxence Carlier
18	FW	FRA	Jonathan Rivas

No.	Pos.	Nation	Player
19	MF	FRA	Derek Mazou-Sacko (on loan from Troyes)
20	FW	FRA	Alexis Lefebvre (on loan from Troyes)
21	DF	FRA	Lucas Pellegrini
22	DF	FRA	Shaquil Delos
23	MF	FRA	Louis Carnot
24	DF	FRA	Gaëtan Bussmann
27	FW	FRA	Josselin Gromat
28	FW	MTQ	Kévin Farade (on loan from Annecy)
29	FW	FRA	Lamine Cissé
30	GK	FRA	Marco Giagnorio
33	FW	FRA	Amine Mokhtari
33	MF	GUI	Kerfala Sylla
34	MF	POR	Carlos Tavares
34	DF	FRA	Bilal Er Rafif

== Pre-season and friendlies ==
Win Draw Loss Fixtures

8 December 2023 Friendly	Colmar	0–2	Nancy	Colmar
18:30		Report	Farade 41'; Gomel 67'

20 February 2024 Friendly	Nancy	5–1	(Luxembourg) FC Swift Hesperange	Tomblaine
		Report		Stadium: Stade Marcel Picot

== Competitions ==
=== Overall record ===
Competition	First match	Last match	Starting round	Final position	Record							
Competition	First match	Last match	Starting round	Final position	Pld	W	D	L	GF	GA	GD	Win %
Championnat National	11 August 2023	17 May 2024	Matchday 1		30	13	9	8	43	35	+8	43.33
Coupe de France	14 October 2023		Fifth round	Fifth round	1	0	0	1	0	1	−1	0.00
Total					31	13	9	9	43	36	+7	41.94

Last updated: 19 April 2024
Source: Competitions

=== Championnat National ===
==== League table ====
Pos	Team	Pld	W	D	L	GF	GA	GD	Pts
4	Dijon	34	15	9	10	50	41	+9	54
5	Le Mans	34	14	10	10	49	44	+5	52
6	Nancy (Note: On 23 June 2023, the FFF announced a deduction of one point for Nancy, applicable to the 2023–24 season, due to incidents in the game against Bourg-Péronnas on the final day of the 2022–23 Championnat National season.)	34	14	9	11	51	46	+5	50
7	Rouen (Note: On 28 November 2023, the DNCG announced a deduction of five points for Rouen, due to financial issues. The punishment was upheld on appeal.)	34	15	9	10	41	37	+4	49
8	Sochaux	34	12	12	10	51	44	+7	48

Updated to match(es) played on 18 May 2024. Source: soccerway
Rules for classification: 1) head-to-head results; 2) head-to-head goal difference; 3) goal difference; 4) goals scored; 5) fair play points

==== Results summary ====
Overall								Home						Away					
Pld	W	D	L	GF	GA	GD	Pts	W	D	L	GF	GA	GD	W	D	L	GF	GA	GD
30	13	9	8	43	35	+8	48	8	6	1	26	15	+11	5	3	7	17	20	−3

Last updated: 19 April 2024.
Source: Soccerway

==== Results by round ====
Round	1	2	3	4	5	6	7	8	9	10	11	12	13	14	15	16	17	18	19	20	21	22	23	24	25	26	27	28	29	30
Ground	H	H	A	H	A	H	A	H	A	H	A	H	A	H	A	H	A	A	H	A	H	A	H	A	H	A	H	A	H	A
Result	D	D	W	D	D	W	L	L	L	D	L	D	L	W	W	W	W	W	W	L	W	L	W	D	W	D	D	L	W	W
Position	12	14	6	9	11	4	6	9	11	14	16	17	17	14	12	10	9	6	5	6	4	6	4	4	4	4	4	5	4	

Updated to match(es) played on 19 April 2024. Source: Worldfootball
A = Away; H = Home; W = Win; D = Draw; L = Loss

==== Matches ====
The league fixtures were unveiled on 13 July 2023.

11 August 2023 1	Nancy	1–1	Villefranche	Tomblaine
19:30		Report		Stadium: Stade Marcel Picot; Referee: Pierre Retail

18 August 2023 2	Nancy	2–2	Épinal	Tomblaine
19:30		Report		Stadium: Stade Marcel Picot; Referee: William Toulliou

25 August 2023 3	Cholet	0–2	Nancy	Cholet
19:30				Stadium: Stade Omnisports Jean Bouin; Referee: Samir Zolota

1 September 2023 4	Nancy	2–2	Niort	Tomblaine
				Stadium: Stade Marcel Picot

8 September 2023 5	Marignane GCB	1–1	Nancy	Marignane
				Stadium: Stade Antoine de Saint-Exupéry

18 September 2023 6	Nancy	3–0	Dijon FCO	Tomblaine
				Stadium: Stade Marcel Picot

22 September 2023 7	Nîmes	1–0	Nancy	Nîmes
				Stadium: Stade des Antonins

29 September 2023 8	Nancy	0–2	Versailles	Tomblaine
				Stadium: Stade Marcel Picot

6 October 2023 9	Orléans	1–0	Nancy	Orléans
				Stadium: Stade de la Source

11 October 2023 10	Nancy	1–1	Red Star	Tomblaine
				Stadium: Stade Marcel Picot

20 October 2023 11	GOAL	1–0	Nancy	Chasselay
19:30				Stadium: Stade Ludovic Giuly

3 November 2023 12	Nancy	1–1	Sochaux	Tomblaine
	Gromat 70'		Viltard 90+1'	Stadium: Stade Marcel Picot

10 November 2023 13	Martigues	1–0	Nancy	Martigues
19:30	Tlili 89' (pen.)			Stadium: Stade Francis Turcan

24 November 2023 14	Nancy	1–0	Rouen	Tomblaine
	Farade 5'			Stadium: Stade Marcel Picot

16 February 2024 21	Nancy	4–1	Marignane GCB	Tomblaine
19:30		Report		Stadium: Stade Marcel Picot; Referee: Arnaud Baert

26 February 2024 22	Dijon	3–1	Nancy	Dijon
18:30		Report		Stadium: Stade Gaston Gérard; Referee: Ali Djedid

1 March 2024 23	Nancy	3–1	Nîmes	Tomblaine
19:30		Report		Stadium: Stade Marcel Picot; Referee: Gabriel Henry

8 March 2024 24	Versailles	1–1	Nancy	Paris
19:30	Akueson 70'	Report	Gromat 41'	Stadium: Stade Jean-Bouin; Referee: Robin Chapapria

15 March 2024 25	Nancy	1–0	Orléans	Tomblaine
19:30	Bussmann 31'	Report		Stadium: Stade Marcel Picot; Referee: Samir Zolota

22 March 2024 26	Red Star	1–1	Nancy	Saint-Ouen-sur-Seine
19:30	Benali 61' (pen.)	Report	Bouabdeli 68'	Stadium: Stade Bauer; Referee: Eddy Rosier

30 March 2024 27	Nancy	2–2	GOAL FC	Tomblaine
19:30	Touré 8'; Bouabdeli 19'	Report	Bongué 50'; Calodat 64'	Stadium: Stade Marcel Picot; Referee: Pierre Retail

8 April 2024 28	Sochaux	4–1	Nancy	Montbéliard
21:00	Hoggas 45+2' (pen.), 90+4'; Zohi 45+3'; Macalou 54' (pen.)	Report	Nangis 89' (pen.)	Stadium: Stade Auguste-Bonal; Referee: Soulaimane Chamel

15 April 2024 29	Nancy	3–2	Martigues	Tomblaine
18:30	Touré 16' (pen.), 36'; Rivas 82'	Report	Zouaoui (yellow card) 38' (yellow-red card) 39'; Carlier 43' (o.g.); Diawara 90+4'	Stadium: Stade Marcel Picot; Referee: Robin Chapapria

19 April 2023 30	Rouen	2–3	Nancy	Le Petit-Quevilly
19:30	Ouadah 4'; Sahloune 88' (pen.)	Report	Gromat 32'; Cissé 45+3'; Mazou-Sacko 64'	Stadium: Stade Robert Diochon; Referee: Tifenn Leprodhomme

=== Coupe de France ===
14 October 2023 Fifth round	ES Thaon	1–0	Nancy
