= 2022–23 Chamois Niortais F.C. season =

Chamois Niortais F.C.
2022–23 season
- Chairman: Karim Fradin
- Manager: Sébastien Desabre (until 7 August); Andé Dona Ndoh (until 4 September); Rui Almeida (from 4 September until 1 February); Bernard Simondi (from 9 March)
- Stadium: Stade René Gaillard
- Ligue 2: 20th (relegated)
- Coupe de France: Round of 32
- Top goalscorer: League: Bilal Boutobba (7); All: Bilal Boutobba (7)

The 2022–23 season was the 98th in the history of Chamois Niortais F.C. and their ninth consecutive season in the second division. The club participated in Ligue 2 and the Coupe de France.

== Players ==
As of 31 January 2023

Note: Flags indicate national team as defined under FIFA eligibility rules; some limited exceptions apply. Players may hold more than one non-FIFA nationality.

No.	Pos.	Nation	Player
1	GK	FRA	Mathieu Michel
2	DF	FRA	Quentin Bernard
4	DF	GUI	Ibrahima Conté
5	DF	CMR	Guy Kilama
7	MF	TUN	Moataz Zemzemi
8	MF	GHA	Godwin Bentil
9	FW	FRA	Kévin Rocheteau
10	MF	FRA	Bilal Boutobba
11	FW	FRA	Yanis Merdji
14	DF	FRA	Dylan Durivaux
15	MF	BEN	Junior Olaitan
16	GK	FRA	Jean Louchet
17	MF	MTQ	Samuel Renel
18	DF	FRA	Bradley M'bondo

No.	Pos.	Nation	Player
19	MF	FRA	Yohan Cassubie
20	FW	SEN	Amadou Sagna
21	DF	FRA	Lenny Vallier
22	FW	FRA	Ryan Bakayoko
23	FW	FRA	Sidi Cissé
24	MF	FRA	Tyrone Tormin
25	MF	BFA	Charles Kaboré
26	MF	FRA	Samy Benchamma
27	DF	CGO	Bryan Passi
28	MF	FRA	Nacim El Hassani
29	DF	FRA	Joris Moutachy
30	GK	FRA	Yanis Maronne
36	MF	MTN	Oumar Ngom
—	FW	JAM	Junior Flemmings (on loan from Toulouse)

=== Out on loan ===
Note: Flags indicate national team as defined under FIFA eligibility rules; some limited exceptions apply. Players may hold more than one non-FIFA nationality.

No.	Pos.	Nation	Player
—	MF	FRA	Tom Lebeau (at Concarneau until 30 June 2023)

== Pre-season and friendlies ==
Win Draw Loss

1 July 2022 Friendly	Guingamp (France)	3–1	(France) Niort	Ploufragan, France
17:00 CEST (UTC+2)	Le Normand 14'; Baaloudj 24'; Luvambo 26'		Conté 63'	Stadium: Centre Technique Régional Henri Guérin – terrain 1

10 July 2022 Friendly	Angers (France)	2–1	(France) Niort	Saint-Martin-de-Ré, France
17:00 CEST (UTC+2)	Diony 12'; Salama 78'	Report	Sagna 8'	Stadium: Complexe Sportif Marcel Gaillard

13 July 2022 Friendly	Ajaccio (France)	2–0	(France) Niort	Fougères
18:00 CEST (UTC+2)	Courtet 18'; Cimignani 67'	Report		Stadium: Château du Bois-Guy

23 July 2022 Friendly	Pau (France)	0–1	(France) Niort	Saint-Médard-en-Jalles, France
19:00 CEST (UTC+2)		Report	Bentil 17'	Stadium: Complexe Sportif Robert Monseau

7 December 2022 Friendly	Estrela da Amadora (Portugal)	1–2	(France) Niort	Grândola, Portugal
14:00 WET (UTC±0)	[[]]		Merdji; El Hassani	Stadium: José Mourinho Training Center

14 December 2022 Friendly	Angers (France)	0–1	(France) Niort	Angers, France
15:00 CET (UTC+1)			Boutobba 37' (pen.)	Stadium: Stade Raymond Kopa

20 December 2022 Friendly	Niort (France)	5–3	(France) Bordeaux	Niort
15:30 CET (UTC+1)	Merdji 12', 52'; Boutobba 22', 86', 90'		Mwanga 35'; Bokele 47'; Delaurier-Chaubet 89'	Stadium: Stade René Gaillard

== Competitions ==
=== Overall record ===
Competition	First match	Last match	Starting round	Final position	Record							
Competition	First match	Last match	Starting round	Final position	Pld	W	D	L	GF	GA	GD	Win %
Ligue 2	30 July 2022	2 June 2023	Matchday 1	20th	38	7	8	23	35	67	−32	18.42
Coupe de France	29 October 2022	22 January 2023	Seventh round	Round of 16	4	2	1	1	4	4	+0	50.00
Total					42	9	9	24	39	71	−32	21.43

Source: Soccerway

=== Ligue 2 ===
==== League table ====
Pos	Team	Pld	W	D	L	GF	GA	GD	Pts	Promotion or Relegation
16	Valenciennes	38	10	15	13	42	49	−7	45	
17	Annecy	38	11	12	15	39	51	−12	45	Spared from relegation
18	Dijon (R)	38	10	12	16	38	43	−5	42	Relegation to Championnat National
19	Nîmes (R)	38	10	6	22	44	62	−18	36	Relegation to Championnat National
20	Niort (R)	38	7	8	23	35	67	−32	29	Relegation to Championnat National

Source: Ligue 2
Rules for classification: 1) Points; 2) Goal difference; 3) Number of goals scored; 4) Head-to-head goal difference; 5) Fair play points
(R) Relegated

==== Results summary ====
Overall								Home						Away					
Pld	W	D	L	GF	GA	GD	Pts	W	D	L	GF	GA	GD	W	D	L	GF	GA	GD
38	7	8	23	35	67	−32	29	5	4	10	24	36	−12	2	4	13	11	31	−20

Source: Ligue 2

==== Results by round ====
Round	1	2	3	4	5	6	7	8	9	10	11	12	13	14	15	16	17	18	19	20	21	22	23	24
Ground	A	H	A	H	A	H	A	H	A	H	A	H	H	A	H	A	H	A	H	A	H	A	H	A
Result	W	L	L	W	L	L	D	L	L	D	L	L	W	L	D	D	W	D	L	L	L	W	W	
Position	4	11	13	9	16	16	16	18	20	20	20	20	20	20	19	19	19	18	19	20	20	20	18	

Updated to match(es) played on 11 February 2023. Source: Ligue 2
A = Away; H = Home; W = Win; D = Draw; L = Loss

==== Matches ====
The league fixtures were announced on 17 June 2022.

30 July 2022 1	Annecy	1–2	Niort	Annecy
19:00 CEST (UTC+2)	Temanfo 63'	Report	Merdji 29'; Boutobba 39' (pen.)	Stadium: Parc des Sports; Attendance: 5,288; Referee: Azzedine Souifi

6 August 2022 2	Niort	1–4	Bastia	Niort
19:00 CEST (UTC+2)	Boutobba 82' (pen.)	Report	Tavares 1'; Magri 2', 24'; Ndiaye 21'	Stadium: Stade René Gaillard; Attendance: 2,190; Referee: Benjamin Lepaysant

13 August 2022 3	Bordeaux	1–0	Niort	Bordeaux
19:00 CEST (UTC+2)	Delaurier-Chaubet 61'	Report		Stadium: Matmut Atlantique; Attendance: 20,709; Referee: Gaël Angoula

20 August 2022 4	Niort	2–1	Paris FC	Niort
19:00 CEST (UTC+2)	Boutobba 56'; Zemzemi 61'	Report	Caddy 73'	Stadium: Stade René Gaillard; Attendance: 2,000; Referee: Rémi Landry

27 August 2022 5	Sochaux	3–0	Niort	Montbéliard
19:00 CEST (UTC+2)	Weissbeck 16'; Kaboré 62' (o.g.); Kalulu 90+2'	Report		Stadium: Stade Auguste Bonal; Attendance: 8,980; Referee: Abdelatif Kherradji

30 August 2022 6	Niort	0–1	Valenciennes	Niort
20:45 CEST (UTC+2)		Report	Hamache 30'	Stadium: Stade René Gaillard; Attendance: 2,300; Referee: Faouzi Benchabane

2 September 2022 7	Quevilly-Rouen	3–3	Niort	Caen
20:45 CEST (UTC+2)	Soumaré 12', 40'; Mafouta 32'	Report	Boutobba 27' (pen.), 52' (pen.); Sagna 33'	Stadium: Stade Michel d'Ornano; Attendance: 200; Referee: Nicolas Rainville
Note: Match moved from Stade Robert Diochon due to a Rugby Pro D2 match being played at the stadium on the same day.

10 September 2022 8	Niort	0–1	Le Havre	Niort
19:00 CEST (UTC+2)	Vallier (yellow card) 31'; Passi (yellow card) 53'; Kilama (yellow card) 90+2'	Report	Lekhal 54' (pen.); Richardson (yellow card) 79'; Mahmoud (yellow card) 90'; Confais (yellow card) 90+3'	Stadium: Stade René Gaillard; Attendance: 2,000; Referee: Alexandre Perreau Niel

17 September 2022 9	Amiens	3–0	Niort	Amiens
19:00 CEST (UTC+2)	Fofana 55'; Cissé 60' (pen.); Arokodare 75'	Report	Moutachy (yellow card) 45+1' (yellow-red card) 59'	Stadium: Stade de la Licorne; Attendance: 6,188; Referee: William Toulliou

1 October 2022 10	Niort	0–0	Guingamp	Niort
19:00 CEST (UTC+2)	Kaboré (yellow card) 5'; Conté (yellow card) 40'; Merdji (yellow card) 46'	Report	Muyumba (yellow card) 44'; Louiserre (yellow card) 62'	Stadium: Stade René Gaillard; Attendance: 2,184; Referee: Abdelatif Kherradji

8 October 2022 11	Caen	1–0	Niort	Caen
19:00 CEST (UTC+2)	Deminguet (yellow card) 45+3'; Kyeremeh 45+4'; Obiang (yellow card) 50'; Mendy (yellow card) 67'; Brahimi (yellow card) 90'	Report	Vallier (yellow card) 43'	Stadium: Stade Michel d'Ornano; Attendance: 11,142; Referee: Gaël Angoula

15 October 2022 12	Niort	0–3	Grenoble	Niort
19:00 CEST (UTC+2)	Kilama (red card) 9'; Benchamma (yellow card) 65'; Sagna (yellow card) 74'; Kaboré (yellow card) 84'	Report	Phaëton 19', 77'; Bambock (yellow card) 37'; Ba 84'	Stadium: Stade René Gaillard; Attendance: 1,755; Referee: Olivier Thual

22 October 2022 13	Niort	2–1	Dijon	Niort
19:00 CEST (UTC+2)	M'bondo (yellow card) 9'; Sagna (yellow card) 62'; Boutobba 90', (yellow card) 90+1'; Olaitan (yellow card) 89'; Conté 90+3'	Report	Assalé 52'; Silva (red card) 76'	Stadium: Stade René Gaillard; Attendance: 3,869; Referee: Azzédine Souifi

5 November 2022 14	Laval	2–1	Niort	Laval
19:00 CET (UTC+1)	Roye 14'; Maggiotti 59'	Report	Sagna 24'	Stadium: Stade Francis Le Basser; Attendance: 6,717; Referee: Mikael Lesage

12 November 2022 15	Niort	1–1	Nîmes	Niort
19:00 CET (UTC+1)	Zemzemi 54'; Merdji (yellow card) 63'	Report	Burner (yellow card) 21'; Tchokounté 27'; Djiga (yellow card) 58'; Delpech (red card) 81'; Guessoum (yellow card) 89'	Stadium: Stade René Gaillard; Attendance: 3,788; Referee: William Toulliou

26 December 2022 16	Metz	0–0	Niort	Metz
21:00 CET (UTC+1)	Jean Jacques (yellow card) 73'	Report	Zemzemi (yellow card) 90+2'	Stadium: Stade Saint-Symphorien; Attendance: 14,443; Referee: Alexandre Perreau Niel

30 December 2022 17	Niort	2–1	Pau	Niort
21:00 CET (UTC+1)	Boutobba 15'; Durivaux (yellow card) 32'; Renel 50'	Report	Ros (yellow card) 30'; Kouassi (yellow card) 39'; Yattara 54'	Stadium: Stade René Gaillard; Attendance: 2,151; Referee: Marc Bollengier

10 January 2022 18	Rodez	1–1	Niort	Rodez
20:45 CET (UTC+1)	Raux-Yao (yellow card) 21'; Danger (yellow card) 25'; Rajot 63'	Report	Boutobba 59'; Zemzemi (yellow card) 90+5'	Stadium: Stade Paul-Lignon; Attendance: 2,728; Referee: Faouzi Benchabane

16 January 2023 19	Niort	0–1	Saint-Étienne	Niort
20:45 CET (UTC+1)	Moutachy (yellow card) 84'	Report	Bouchouari (yellow card) 43'; Briançon (yellow card) 53'; Charbonnier 86'	Stadium: Stade René Gaillard; Referee: Antoine Valnet

28 January 2023 20	Nîmes	3–2	Niort	Nîmes
19:00 CET (UTC+1)	Tchokounté 12' (pen.), (yellow card) 44'; Pagis 17', 35'	Report	Boutobba 30'; Rocheteau (yellow card) 39'; Durivaux (yellow card) 53'; Benchamma 63'	Stadium: Stade des Antonins; Attendance: 1,405; Referee: Pierre Legat

31 January 2023 21	Niort	1–3	Amiens	Niort
20:45 CET (UTC+1)	Kaboré (yellow card) 11'; Kilama (red card) 50'; Vallier 70'; Durivaux (yellow card) 80'	Report	Cissé 30', 37', (penalty scored) 51; Assogba (yellow card) 33'	Stadium: Stade René Gaillard; Attendance: 1,753; Referee: William Toulliou

3 February 2023 22	Dijon	0–1	Niort	Dijon
20:45 CET (UTC+1)		Report	Olaitan 22', (yellow card) 77'; Zemzemi (yellow card) 47'; Boutobba (yellow card) 90+5'	Stadium: Stade Gaston Gérard; Attendance: 5,600; Referee: Olivier Thual

11 February 2023 23	Niort	3–1	Bourdeaux	Niort
20:45 CET (UTC+1)	Boutobba (yellow card) 15'; Zemzemi 28'; Passi 45+2'; Olaitan 90+4', (yellow card) 90+5'	Report	Badji 30'; Ihnatenko (yellow card) 45+1'	Stadium: Stade René Gaillard; Attendance: 5,446; Referee: Aurélien Petit

18 February 2023 24	Le Havre	1–0	Niort	Le Havre
19:00 CET (UTC+1)	Grandsir (yellow card) 71'; Kongolo (yellow card) 73'; Cornette 87'	Report	Olaitan (yellow card) 90+4'	Stadium: Stade Océane; Attendance: 9,064; Referee: Azzédine Souifi

25 February 2023 25	Paris FC	3–0	Niort	Paris
19:00 CET (UTC+1)	Guilavogui 72' (pen.), 86'; Kebbal 90+3'	Report	Renel (yellow card) 9'	Stadium: Stade Sébastien Charléty; Attendance: 2,205; Referee: William Toulliou

4 March 2023 26	Niort	2–3	Rodez	Niort
19:00 CET (UTC+1)	Olaitan 11'; Flemmings 79'	Report	Danger 24' (pen.); Passi 31' (o.g.); Abdallah (yellow card) 45+2'; Buadés 87'; Boissier (yellow card) 88'; Valério (yellow card) 88'	Stadium: Stade René Gaillard; Attendance: 2,349; Referee: Mikael Lesage

11 March 2023 27	Pau	1–0	Niort	Pau
19:00 CET (UTC+1)	Boisgard 12'; Beusnard (yellow card) 62'; Monzango (yellow card) 90+1'	Report	Boutobba (yellow card) 39'; Flemmings (yellow card) 78'; Kaboré (yellow card) 79'	Stadium: Nouste Camp; Attendance: 2,531; Referee: Azzédine Souifi

18 March 2023 28	Niort	3–2	Laval	Niort
19:00 CET (UTC+1)	Conté (yellow card) 3' (yellow-red card) 90+7'; Kaboré (yellow card) 15'; Boutobba 45+2'; Renel 72'; Rocheteau 88' (pen.); Passi (yellow card) 90+5'	Report	Bobichon 40'; B. Gonçalves (yellow card) 79' (yellow-red card) 90+7'; Elisor 83'; Seidou (yellow card) 88'	Stadium: Stade René Gaillard; Attendance: 2,213; Referee: Pierre Legat

1 April 2023 29	Saint-Étienne	2–0	Niort	Saint-Étienne
15:00 CET (UTC+1)	Wadji 51', 70'	Report	Bernard (yellow card) 58'	Stadium: Stade Geoffroy-Guichard; Attendance: 24,284; Referee: Faouzi Benchabane

8 April 2023 30	Niort	0–3	Sochaux	Niort
19:00 CEST (UTC+2)	Kaboré (yellow card) 48'	Report	Doumbia 4'; Sissoko 29'; Ndiaye 40'; Agouzoul (yellow card) 48'	Stadium: Stade René Gaillard; Attendance: 2,298; Referee: Romain Lissorgue

15 April 2023 31	Valenciennes	0–0	Niort	Valenciennes
19:00 CEST (UTC+2)	Boudraa (yellow card) 19'; Cuffaut (yellow card) 31'	Report		Stadium: Stade Nungesser; Attendance: 8,375; Referee: Benjamin Lepaysant

22 April 2023 32	Niort	1–2	Caen	Niort
19:00 CEST (UTC+2)	Mandrea 55' (o.g.)	Report	Thomas 13'; Kilama 32' (o.g.); Daubin (yellow card) 32'	Stadium: Stade René Gaillard; Attendance: 2,184; Referee: William Toulliou

29 April 2023 33	Grenoble	2–0	Niort	Grenoble
19:00 CET (UTC+1)	Sanyang 30'; Correa 90'	Report	Bernard (yellow card) 70'	Stadium: Stade des Alpes; Attendance: 3,145; Referee: Gaël Angoula

6 May 2023 34	Niort	1–3	Metz	Niort
19:00 CEST (UTC+2)	Elphege 42'	Report	Mikautadze 45' (pen.), 83'; Maziz 51'; Jean Jacques (yellow card) 70'; Kouao (yellow card) 76'	Stadium: Stade René Gaillard; Attendance: 2,056; Referee: Romain Lissorgue

13 May 2023 35	Bastia	2–1	Niort	Furiani
19:00 CEST (UTC+2)	Van Den Kerkhof 49'; Tavares (yellow card) 53'; Santelli 71' (pen.); Palun (yellow card) 73'	Report	Ngom (yellow card) 44', (goal) 54'; Durivaux (yellow card) 47'	Stadium: Stade Armand-Cesari; Attendance: 8,499; Referee: Antoine Valnet

20 May 2023 36	Niort	2–2	Annecy	Niort
19:00 CEST (UTC+2)	Zemzemi 49'; Sagna 58'; Merdji (yellow card) 90+4'	Report	Sahi 16', 64'; Pajot (yellow card) 52'; Farade (yellow card) 90+4'	Stadium: Stade René Gaillard; Attendance: 1,627; Referee: Azzédine Souifi

26 May 2023 37	Guingamp	2–0	Niort	Guingamp
20:45 CEST (UTC+2)	Courtet 31', 90+4'; Gaudin (yellow card) 86'	Report		Stadium: Stade de Roudourou; Attendance: 12,885; Referee: William Toulliou

2 June 2023 38	Niort	3–3	Quevilly-Rouen	Niort
20:45 CEST (UTC+2)	Zemzemi 34'; Sagna 44'; Boutobba 90+3'	Report	Sidibé 45+1', (yellow card) 50'; Bangré 49', 66'	Stadium: Stade René Gaillard; Attendance: 1,759; Referee: Rémi Landry

=== Coupe de France ===
29 October 2022 Seventh round	FCE Mérignac Arlac	0–1	Niort	Mérignac
14:00 CEST		Report	Rocheteau 10'	Stadium: Stade Robert Brettes; Attendance: 1,137; Referee: Robin Chapapria

18 November 2022 Eighth round	Bergerac Périgord FC	0–0 (4–5 p)	Niort	Bergerac
20:00 CET		Report		Stadium: Stade de Campréal; Attendance: 1,021; Referee: Aurélien Petit

7 January 2023 Round of 64	US Granville	0–3	Niort	Granville
18:00 CET		Report	Olaitan 56', 69'; Merdji 77'	Stadium: Stade Louis Dior; Attendance: 1,390; Referee: Aurélien Petit

22 January 2023 Round of 32	Niort	0–4	Auxerre	Niort
18:30 CET		Report	Perrin 39', 67'; Da Costa 43'; Abline 64'	Stadium: Stade René Gaillard; Attendance: 2,429; Referee: Ruddy Buquet
