= Blondon Meyapya =

Cameroonian footballer (born 2001)

Personal information
- Full name: Blondon Belanof Meyapya Fongain
- Date of birth: 10 February 2001 (age 25)
- Place of birth: Yaoundé, Cameroon
- Height: 1.74 m (5 ft 9 in)
- Position: Defender

Team information
- Current team: Radnik Bijeljina
- Number: 5

Senior career*
| Years | Team | Apps | (Gls) |
| –2021 | Fauve Azur | | |
| 2021 | Angers B | | |
| 2022–2025 | Red Star | 67 | (3) |
| 2026– | Radnik Bijeljina | 15 | (0) |
- * Club domestic league appearances and goals as of 31 October 2026

Blondon Belanof Meyapya Fongain (born 10 February 2001) is a Cameroonian professional footballer who plays as a defender for Bosnian Premier League club Radnik Bijeljina.

== Career ==
In 2022, Meyapya signed for French side Red Star. He was regarded as one of the club's most important players. He helped the club achieve promotion.

== Career statistics ==
=== Club ===
As of match played 31 October 2026

Appearances and goals by club, season and competition
| Club | Season | League | | | National cup (Note: Includes Coupe de France, Bosnian Cup) | | Total | |
| Club | Season | Division | Apps | Goals | Apps | Goals | Apps | Goals |
|---|---|---|---|---|---|---|---|---|
| Red Star | 2021–22 | Championnat National | 9 | 0 | — | | 9 | 0 |
| Red Star | 2022–23 | Championnat National | 20 | 2 | 2 | 0 | 22 | 2 |
| Red Star | 2023–24 | Championnat National | 26 | 1 | — | | 26 | 1 |
| Red Star | 2024–25 | Ligue 2 | 12 | 0 | 1 | 0 | 13 | 0 |
| Red Star | Total | | 67 | 3 | 3 | 0 | 70 | 3 |
| Radnik Bijeljina | 2025–26 | Bosnian Premier League | 7 | 0 | 1 | 0 | 8 | 0 |
| Radnik Bijeljina | 2026–27 | Bosnian Premier League | 8 | 0 | 0 | 0 | 8 | 0 |
| Radnik Bijeljina | Total | | 15 | 0 | 1 | 0 | 16 | 0 |
| Career total | | | 82 | 3 | 4 | 0 | 86 | 3 |

== Style of play ==
Meyapya mainly operates as a defender. He is known for his aerial ability.
