= Jimmy Modeste =

Footballer (born 1981)

Personal information
- Date of birth: 8 July 1981 (age 45)
- Place of birth: Paris, France
- Height: 1.80 m (5 ft 11 in)
- Position: Defender

Team information
- Current team: Entente SSG (Manager)

Senior career*
Years	Team	Apps	(Gls)
1999–2008	Paris FC	179	(3)
2000–2001	→ Le Mans (loan)	1	(0)
2002–2003	→ Brest (loan)	13	(0)
2008–2009	Chamois Niortais	21	(0)
2009–2010	Bohemians Prague	10	(0)
2010–2011	AEP Paphos	21	(0)
2011–2013	Nea Salamina	59	(0)
2013–2015	Glyfada	6	(0)
2015–2016	Aubervilliers	24	(2)

International career
2002–2005	Cape Verde	13	(1)

Managerial career
- 2016–2019: Entente SSG (assistant)
- 2017–2019: Noisy-le-Grand (assistant)
- 2019–2021: Red Star (assistant)
- 2022–: Entente SSG
- * Club domestic league appearances and goals

Jimmy Modeste (born 8 July 1981) is a Cape Verdean former professional football defender and current manager of French club Entente SSG.

== Early life ==
Modeste was born in Paris, France.

== Coaching career ==
=== Entente SSG and Noisy-le-Grand ===
In the summer of 2016, when Modeste also retired as an active footballer, he was hired as an assistant coach for Entente SSG under head coach Vincent Bordot. In the 2017-18 season, Modeste also became an assistant coach at Noisy-le-Grand FC under Moussa Sidibé, alongside his assistant coaching position at Entente SSG. In addition to this, he was in the same, Modeste was also coaching at Noisy-le-Grand's academy (from under-6s to under-15s).

In January 2019, the two clubs where Modeste held the assistant manager role both knocked out professional opposition in the ninth round of the Coupe de France on consecutive days. Entente SSG beat Ligue 1 side Montpellier HSC on 5 January and Noisy-le-Grand FC beat Ligue 2 side Gazélec Ajaccio on 6 January.

=== Red Star ===
Modeste followed ESSG manager Vincent Bordot to Red Star in the summer of 2019, keeping an assistant manager role. The duo left the club on 13 September 2021.

=== Return to Entente SSG ===
On 31 May 2022, Entente SSG confirmed that Modeste was the club's new head coach from the upcoming 2022–23 season. Ahead of the 2023–24 season, Modeste extended his deal with Entente.

== Career statistics ==
=== International ===
Scores and results list Cape Verde's goal tally first, score column indicates score after each Modeste goal.

List of international goals scored by Jimmy Modeste
No.	Date	Venue	Opponent	Score	Result	Competition
1	3 July 2004	Estádio da Várzea, Praia, Cape Verde	DR Congo	1–1	1–1	2006 FIFA World Cup qualification
