= Loïc Kouagba =

French footballer (born 1994)

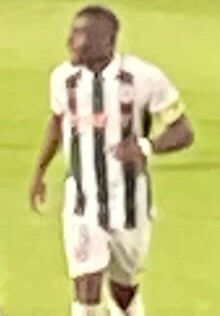
- Kouagba with Red Star in 2024

Personal information
- Date of birth: 9 June 1994 (age 32)
- Place of birth: Boulogne-Billancourt, France
- Height: 1.83 m (6 ft 0 in)
- Position: Defender

Team information
- Current team: Iğdır

Senior career*
Years	Team	Apps	(Gls)
2014–2017	Boulogne-Billancourt	30	(1)
2015	→ Sedan (loan)	0	(0)
2017–2018	Martigues	24	(0)
2018–2019	Béziers	0	(0)
2019	→ Marignane Gignac (loan)	15	(0)
2019–2022	Dunkerque	55	(0)
2022–2025	Red Star	115	(3)
2025–2026	Boluspor	36	(1)
2026–	Iğdır	0	(0)
- * Club domestic league appearances and goals as of 6 May 2026

Loïc Robert Kouagba (born 9 June 1994) is a French professional footballer who plays as a defender for Turkish TFF 1. Lig club Iğdır.

== Career ==
On 24 June 2018, Kouagba signed a professional contract with Béziers. He made his professional debut with Béziers in a 1–1 (6–5) shootout loss in the Coupe de la Ligue to Orléans on 14 August 2018. He joined Marignane Gignac on loan in January 2019.

In August 2019 Kouagba moved to Dunkerque, signing a one-year deal. On 6 January 2022, he moved to Red Star.

On 24 August 2025, Kouagba signed a two-season contract with Boluspor in Turkey.

== Personal life ==
Born in France to a mother born in Koumassi, Kouagba is Ivorian by descent.

== Honours ==
Red Star

- Championnat National: 2023–24
