= Ryad Hachem =

French footballer (born 1998)

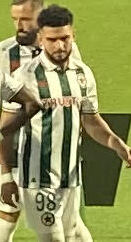
- Hachem with Red Star in 2024

Personal information
- Date of birth: 26 May 1998 (age 28)
- Place of birth: Livry-Gargan, France
- Height: 1.73 m (5 ft 8 in)
- Position: Left-back

Team information
- Current team: Nantes
- Number: 26

Youth career
- US Sevran
- Red Star
- –2016: Drancy
- 2016–2017: Paris FC

Senior career*
Years	Team	Apps	(Gls)
2016–2017	Paris FC B	4	(1)
2017–2021	Guingamp B	57	(8)
2021–2022	Cholet	31	(0)
2022–2026	Red Star	127	(4)
2026–	Nantes	2	(0)
- * Club domestic league appearances and goals as of 7 September 2026

Ryad Hachem (born 26 May 1998) is a French professional footballer who plays as a left-back for Ligue 2 club Nantes.

== Career ==
Born in Livry-Gargan, Seine-Saint-Denis, Hachem came through the academies of US Sevran, Red Star, Drancy, and Paris FC. He went on to play for the reserve sides of Paris FC and Guingamp before making his senior debut with Cholet in the 2021–22 Championnat National season.

Hachem transferred to his former club Red Star in 2022, where he had previously played in the under-9 and under-11 categories. In the 2023–24 season, he was an instrumental player in Habib Beye's side's Championnat National triumph and promotion to Ligue 2. On 18 October 2024, Hachem scored his first Ligue 2 goal in a 2–2 draw against Caen. After controlling the ball with his chest, he sent a volley into the top corner with a shot with the exterior of his left foot. The goal was described as "incredible" by RMC Sport.

On 27 August 2026, Hachem joined fellow Ligue 2 side Nantes.

== Personal life ==
Hachem is of Algerian descent from the town of Ghazaouet, Tlemcen Province. His younger brother Abdelsamad Hachem joined him at Red Star in 2025.

== Honours ==
Red Star

- Championnat National: 2023–24
