= Fodé Doucouré =

Malian footballer (born 2001)

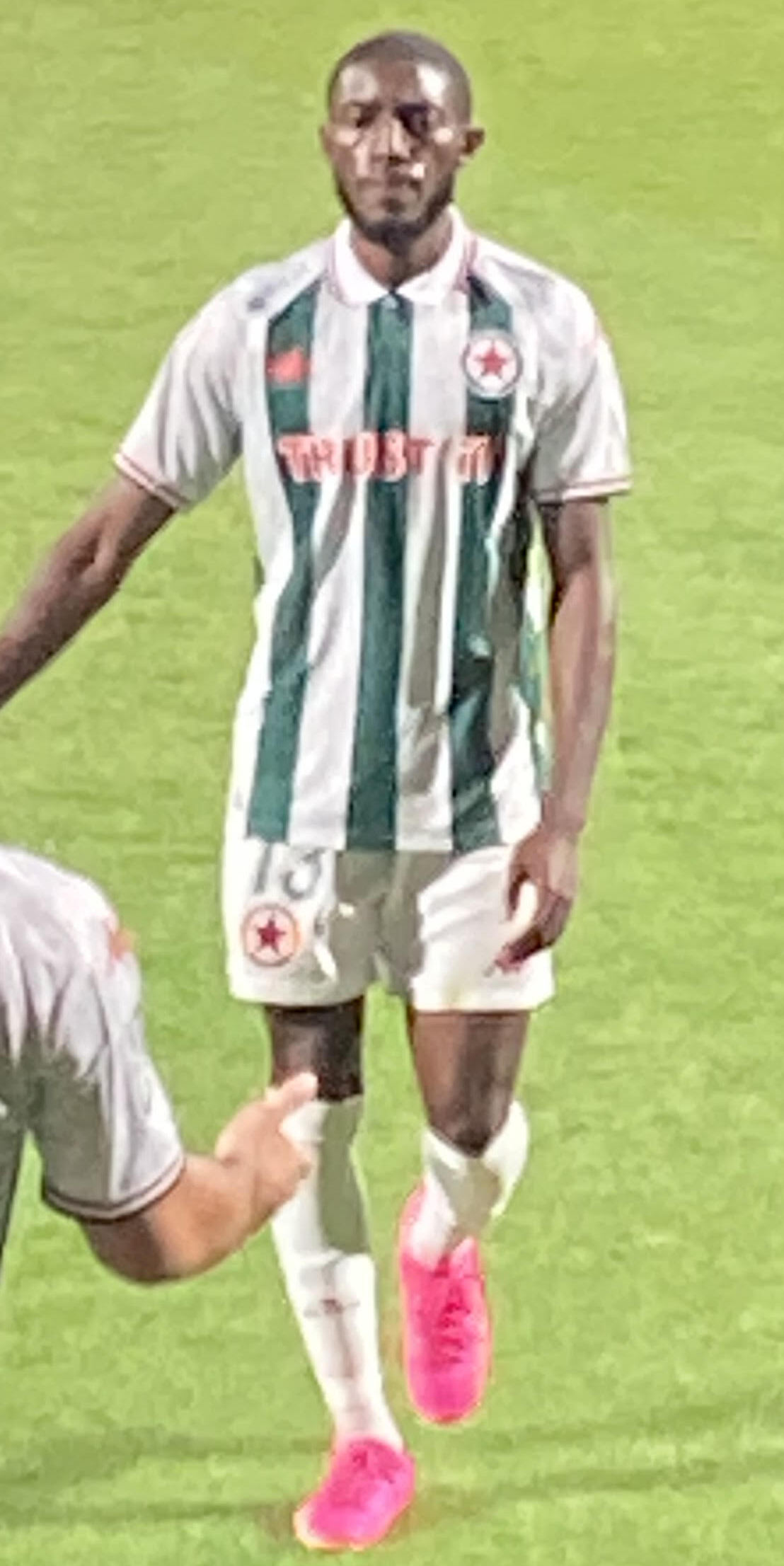
- Doucouré with Red Star in 2024

Personal information
- Date of birth: 3 February 2001 (age 25)
- Place of birth: Bamako, Mali
- Height: 1.72 m (5 ft 8 in)
- Position: Right-back

Team information
- Current team: Nantes
- Number: 13

Youth career
- 2018–2019: Diambars

Senior career*
Years	Team	Apps	(Gls)
2019–2022	Reims B	27	(0)
2020–2022	Reims	10	(0)
2022	→ Red Star (loan)	15	(0)
2022–2025	Red Star	78	(3)
2025–2026	Le Havre	28	(3)
2026–	Nantes	1	(0)

International career^{‡}
2023	Mali Olympic	5	(0)
2024–	Mali	10	(0)
- * Club domestic league appearances and goals as of 7 September 2026 ‡ National team caps and goals as of 22:13, 31 March 2026 (UTC)

Fodé Doucouré (born 3 February 2001) is a Malian professional footballer who plays as a right-back for French Ligue 2 club Nantes and the Mali national team.

== Club career ==
On 11 July 2019, Doucouré signed a professional contract with Reims. He made his professional debut with Reims in a 4–0 Ligue 1 win over Montpellier on 25 October 2020.

On 10 January 2022, he joined Red Star on loan until the end of the season. On 25 July 2022, Doucouré returned to Red Star on a permanent basis.

On 25 July 2022, Doucouré permanently joined Red Star. The Malian defender signed a contract running until June 2025. He won the Championnat National title with the club in 2024.

On 22 July 2025, Doucouré signed a two-year contract with Le Havre in Ligue 1.

== International career ==
In the summer of 2023, Doucouré played for the Mali national team at the U-23 Africa Cup of Nations. He was a regular starter for the team during the tournament, where Mali won the bronze medal, which secured qualification for the Olympic Games. Doucouré himself was named to the tournament's Team of the Tournament. In July 2024, he competed at the Summer Olympics in Paris, where the Malian team failed to advance from the group stage, collecting only one point.

Doucouré made his debut for the senior Mali national team on 6 September 2024 in a 2025 Africa Cup of Nations qualification match against Mozambique, in which he provided an assist.

On 11 December 2025, Doucouré was called up to the Mali squad for the 2025 Africa Cup of Nations.

== Career statistics ==
=== Club ===
As of match played 29 August 2026

Appearances and goals by club, season and competition
Club	Season	League			National cup		Europe		Total	
Club	Season	Division	Apps	Goals	Apps	Goals	Apps	Goals	Apps	Goals
Reims II	2019–20	CFA 2	20	0	—		—		20	0
Reims II	2020–21	CFA 2	5	0	—		—		5	0
Reims II	2021–22	CFA 2	2	0	—		—		2	0
Reims II	Total		27	0	—		—		27	0
Reims	2020–21	Ligue 1	7	0	0	0	0	0	7	0
Reims	2021–22	Ligue 1	3	0	0	0	—		3	0
Reims	Total		10	0	0	0	0	0	10	0
Red Star (loan)	2021–22	CFA	15	0	0	0	—		15	0
Red Star	2022–23	CFA	26	1	0	0	—		26	1
Red Star	2023–24	CFA	30	1	1	0	—		31	1
Red Star	2024–25	Ligue 2	22	1	1	0	—		23	1
Red Star	Total		78	3	2	0	—		80	3
Le Havre	2025–26	Ligue 1	26	3	0	0	—		26	3
Le Havre	2026–27	Ligue 1	2	0	0	0	—		2	0
Le Havre	Total		28	3	0	0	—		28	3
Career total			158	6	2	0	0	0	160	6

=== International ===
As of match played on 31 March 2026

Appearances and goals by national team and year
National team	Year	Apps	Goals
Mali	2024	5	0
Mali	2025	4	0
Mali	2026	1	0
Total		10	0

== Honours ==
Red Star

- Championnat National: 2023–24
