= Maxime Nonnenmacher =

French footballer (born 2002)

Personal information
- Date of birth: 23 July 2002 (age 24)
- Place of birth: Strasbourg, France
- Height: 1.80 m (5 ft 11 in)
- Position: Midfielder

Team information
- Current team: FR Haguenau
- Number: 5

Youth career
- AS Hœrdt
- –2017: Strasbourg
- 2017–2024: Nancy

Senior career*
Years	Team	Apps	(Gls)
2020–2024	Nancy B	42	(2)
2021–2024	Nancy	15	(0)
2024–2025	Le Mans	8	(0)
2025–	FR Haguenau	0	(0)
- * Club domestic league appearances and goals as of 16 May 2025

Maxime "Max" Nonnenmacher (born 23 July 2002) is a French professional footballer who plays as a midfielder for Championnat National 1 club FR Haguenau.

== Career ==
Nonnenmacher hails from a family of footballers, with his father and uncle both having played. He collected footballs in his childhood. Having initially played for AS Hœrdt, Nonnenmacher joined the youth academy of Strasbourg at the age of 9. He joined Nancy's academy in 2017.

On 18 December 2021, Nonnenmacher made his first professional start for Nancy in a Coupe de France match against Troyes. He received two yellow cards, and was sent off in the 32nd minute. His first league start for Nancy came in a 1–1 draw against Red Star on 22 March 2024. In July 2024, Nonnenmacher joined Championnat National club Le Mans on a free transfer.
