= Hacène Benali =

Algerian footballer (born 1999)

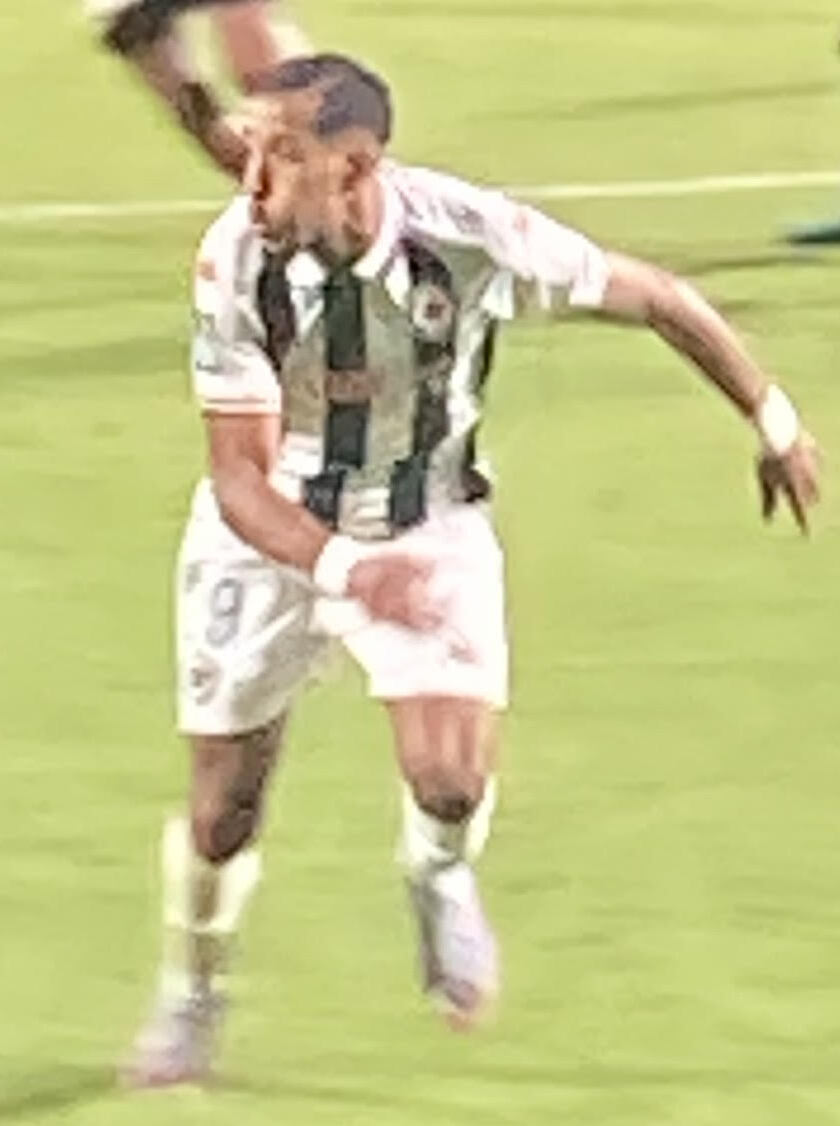
- Benali with Red Star in 2024

Personal information
- Date of birth: 14 October 1999 (age 27)
- Place of birth: Algeria
- Height: 1.82 m (6 ft 0 in)
- Positions: Winger; forward

Team information
- Current team: Pau
- Number: 7

Youth career
- 2011–2016: ES Buxerolles
- 2016–2017: Migné-Auxances
- 2017–2018: Poitiers

Senior career*
Years	Team	Apps	(Gls)
2018–2019	Poitiers	22	(7)
2019–2021	Concarneau	47	(10)
2021–2026	Red Star	132	(34)
2026–	Pau	2	(0)
- * Club domestic league appearances and goals as of 23:35, 15 August 2026 (UTC)

Hacène Benali (Arabic: حسين بنعلي; born 14 October 1999) is an Algerian professional footballer who plays as a winger and forward for Ligue 2 club Pau.

== Career ==
Benali joined ES Buxerolles in 2011, where he would play youth football until 2016. He then joined Migné-Auxances, playing one season for the club's under-19 side before signing for Poitiers. In the 2017–18 season, he scored 19 goals for Poitiers's under-19 team, earning him promotion to the club's reserve team. His immediate success with the reserves led to him to integrate the first team in September 2018. In his Championnat National 3 debut on 8 September 2018, he scored Poitiers's goal in a 1–1 draw against Bayonne. His contributions played a large part in Poitiers's efforts to avoid relegation, and caught the eye of Concarneau, who signed him in July 2019.

In his first season at Concarneau, Benali scored three goals in nineteen Championnat National matches, including nine starts. At the end of the season, he signed a contract extension until the end of the 2021–22 season. In the first half of the 2020–21 season, Benali scored six league goals for Concarneau. However, he experienced a more complicated second half of the season, starting fewer matches and occasionally being left out of the matchday squad, which manager Stéphane Le Mignan attributed to a dip in Benali's form. Nevertheless, he ended the season as Concarneau's most productive offensive player with seven goals and three assists in twenty-seven games.

On 19 August 2021, Benali was transferred to Championnat National club Red Star. In the 2023–24 season, he finished as the fourth top scorer in the Championnat National with thirteen goals, making him Red Star's top scorer and helping his team finish in first place to win promotion to Ligue 2.

On 31 July 2026, Benali signed for fellow Ligue 2 club Pau, leaving Red Star after five years at the club.

== Personal life ==
Born in Algeria, Benali moved to France in 2009. He holds both French and Algerian citizenship. His three brothers Ibrahim, Mohamed, and Abdel have all played at ES Buxerolles.

== Honours ==
Red Star

- Championnat National: 2023–24
