= Damien Durand =

French footballer (born 1995)

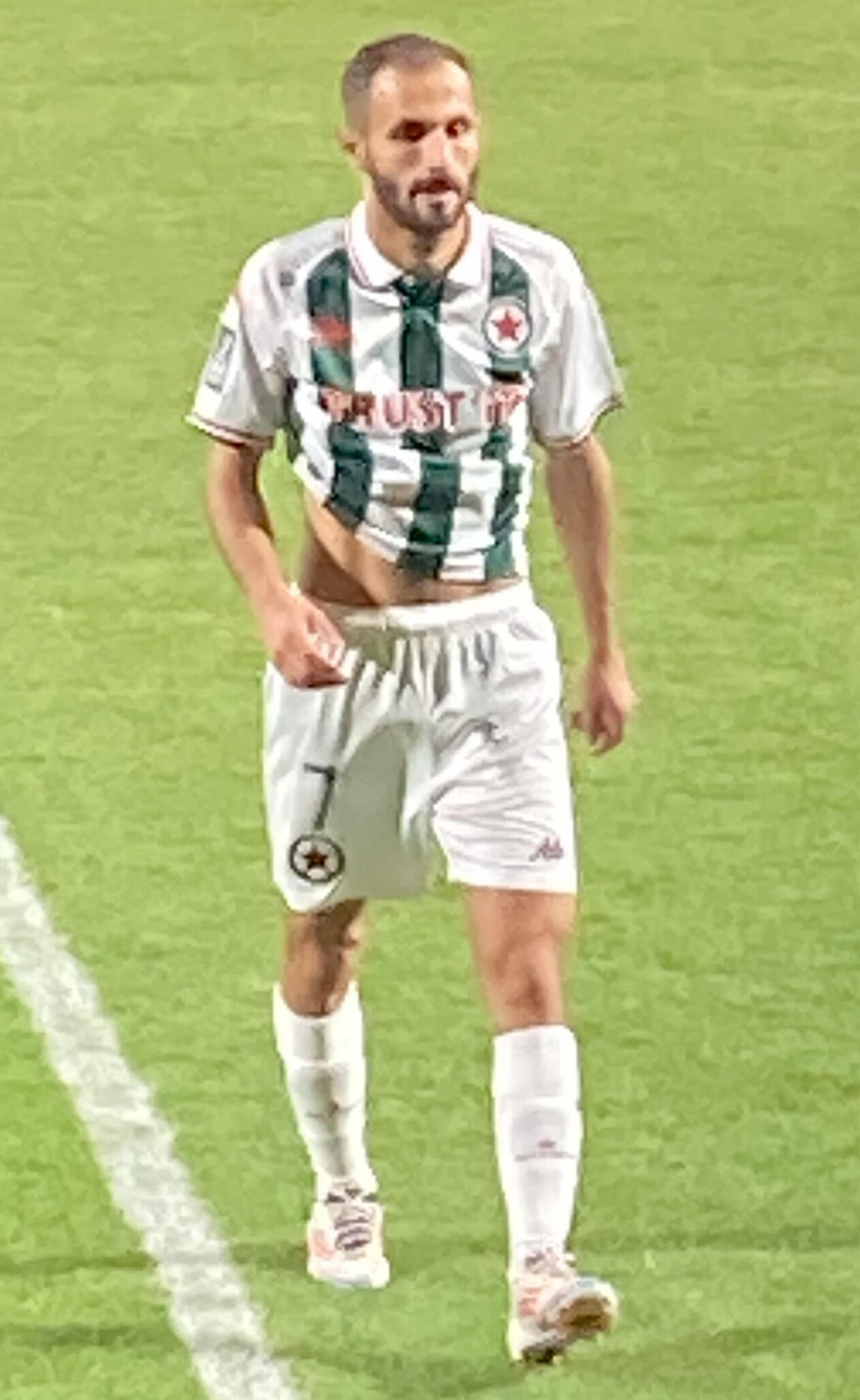
- Durand with Red Star in 2024

Personal information
- Date of birth: 16 September 1995 (age 31)
- Place of birth: Les Ulis, France
- Height: 1.73 m (5 ft 8 in)
- Position: Left winger

Team information
- Current team: Red Star
- Number: 7

Youth career
- Morangis-Chilly

Senior career*
Years	Team	Apps	(Gls)
2014–2017	Morangis-Chilly		
2017–2019	Les Ulis	48	(5)
2019–2020	Sainte-Geneviève	20	(3)
2020–	Red Star	189	(46)
- * Club domestic league appearances and goals as of 11 May 2026

Damien Durand (born 16 September 1995) is a French professional footballer who plays as a left winger for Ligue 2 club Red Star.

== Early life ==
Durand's father Denis played in Bordeaux's youth academy alongside players such as Bixente Lizarazu and Christophe Dugarry.

Durand practiced judo in his childhood. As a green belt, he won the Essonne championship in the under 38 kg category.

== Career ==
Growing up in Chilly-Mazarin, Durand began playing senior football at a "very young" age with Morangis-Chilly in the Division d'Honneur Régionale (DHR), the seventh tier of French football at the time. In 2017, he signed for Les Ulis in the Championnat National 3, and in 2019, for Sainte-Geneviève in the Championnat National 2. Concurrently, Durand obtained a Brevet d'Aptitude aux Fonctions d'Animateur (BAFA), a qualification that enables individuals to lead activities for children and adolescents in camps or recreational centers. Up until 2020, he was employed by the town of Morangis, and hoped to pursue a career in the public sector.

In the summer of 2020, Durand signed a professional contract for Championnat National club Red Star. On 24 August 2020, he made his debut for the club in a 5–3 defeat to Bastia, scoring two goals and earning a penalty for his team. After his performances in the first half of the season, for which he was described as a "revelation" of the Championnat National by several observers, Durand earned a contract extension with Red Star lasting until the end of the 2022–23 season.

In the 2023–24 season, Durand finished as the Championnat National's joint top assist provider with eight assists as Red Star finished in first place and achieved promotion to Ligue 2. On 30 August 2024, he scored his first Ligue 2 goal in a 4–3 victory over Guingamp.

== Career statistics ==
As of match played 20 February 2026

Appearances and goals by club, season and competition
Club	Season	League			National cup (Note: Includes Coupe de France)		Other		Total	
Club	Season	Division	Apps	Goals	Apps	Goals	Apps	Goals	Apps	Goals
CO Les Ulis	2017–18	National 3	24	2	0	0	–		24	2
CO Les Ulis	2018–19	National 3	24	3	0	0	–		24	3
CO Les Ulis	Total		48	5	0	0	—		48	5
Sainte-Geneviève Sports	2019–20	National 2	20	3	1	0	–		21	3
Red Star	2020–21	National	34	9	4	1	–		38	10
Red Star	2021–22	National	31	8	2	2	–		33	10
Red Star	2022–23	National	28	5	3	1	–		31	6
Red Star	2023–24	National	30	4	2	0	–		32	4
Red Star	2024–25	Ligue 2	34	7	2	0	–		36	7
Red Star	2025–26	Ligue 2	22	9	0	0	–		22	9
Red Star	Total		179	42	13	4	—		191	46
Career total			247	50	14	4	–		261	54

== Honours ==
Red Star

- Championnat National: 2023–24

Individual

- Championnat National top assist provider: 2023–24
