= Kémo Cissé =

French footballer (born 1996)

Personal information
- Date of birth: 15 December 1996 (age 29)
- Place of birth: Paris, France
- Height: 1.70 m (5 ft 7 in)
- Position: Winger

Team information
- Current team: Red Star
- Number: 11

Senior career*
Years	Team	Apps	(Gls)
–2020	AS Saint-Ouen-l'Aumône		
2020–2022	Paris 13 Atletico	36	(4)
2022–	Red Star	105	(16)
- * Club domestic league appearances and goals as of 11 May 2026

Kémo Cissé (born 15 December 1996) is a French professional footballer who plays as a winger for Ligue 2 club Red Star.

== Career ==
Cissé came through AS Saint-Ouen-l'Aumône before signing for Paris 13 Atletico in 2020, at the same time as his brother Moustapha. In the 2021–22 season, he scored four goals and provided four assists, helping his team win the Championnat National 2. He subsequently signed for Championnat National club Red Star. In his second season at the club, Cissé scored seven goals and provided two assists in Red Star's Championnat National triumph and promotion to Ligue 2.

== Personal life ==
Born in France, Cissé is of Senegalese descent. He has stated that it is a childhood dream of his to represent Senegal.

Cissé's brother Moustapha is also a professional footballer.

== Honours ==
Paris 13 Atletico

- Championnat National 2: 2021–22

Red Star

- Championnat National: 2023–24
