= Aliou Badji =

Senegalese footballer (born 1997)

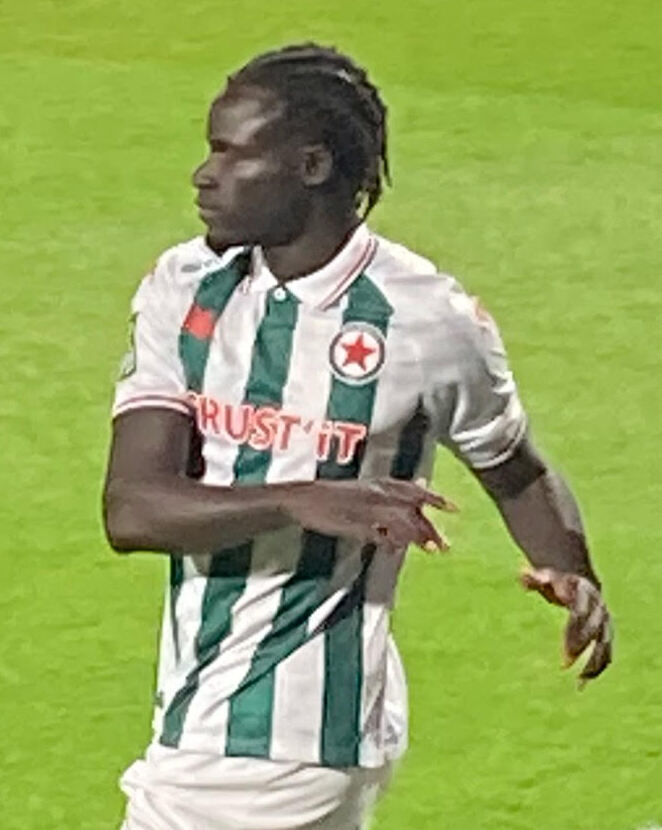
- Badji with Red Star in 2024

Personal information
- Date of birth: 10 October 1997 (age 29)
- Place of birth: Ziguinchor, Senegal
- Height: 1.89 m (6 ft 2 in)
- Position: Forward

Team information
- Current team: Levadiakos
- Number: 25

Youth career
- Casa Sports

Senior career*
Years	Team	Apps	(Gls)
2015–2017	Casa Sports		
2017–2019	Djurgårdens IF	48	(11)
2019–2020	Rapid Wien	29	(8)
2020–2022	Al Ahly	18	(4)
2021	→ Ankaragücü (loan)	13	(3)
2021–2022	→ Amiens (loan)	26	(13)
2022–2023	Amiens	3	(0)
2022–2023	→ Bordeaux (loan)	29	(4)
2023–2024	Bordeaux	12	(0)
2024	→ Gaziantep (loan)	14	(1)
2024–2025	Red Star	30	(7)
2025–2026	Sivasspor	20	(2)
2026–	Levadiakos	0	(0)

International career
	Senegal U20	21	(13)
- * Club domestic league appearances and goals as of 2 August 2026

Aliou Badji (born 10 October 1997) is a Senegalese professional footballer who plays as a forward for Super League Greece club Levadiakos.

== Club career ==
Casa Sports was Badji's first club. On 31 January 2017, he completed a transfer to Sweden to join Allsvenskan side Djurgårdens IF, signing a four-year contract. His professional debut for the club came on 3 April in a league game against IK Sirius. Badji scored his first professional goal on 23 July in the league versus Östersunds FK. In the next game, Badji started for the first time and scored after 30 minutes against AFC Eskilstuna. While having difficulties establishing himself as a starter in his first seasons at Djurgårdens IF, Badji earned a reputation as a late-in-the-game goal scorer, with key goals scored late against Häcken, Mariupol and AIK.

In January 2019, it was revealed Badji had rejected a move to Hebei China Fortune of the Chinese Super League. On 6 February, Badji was transferred to Rapid Wien for an undisclosed fee; signing a three-a-half-year contract. On 16 January 2020, Egyptian Premier League side Al Ahly announced the signing of Badji on a four-and-half-year contract for a reported fee of €2 million. He netted on his league debut for the club, scoring the equaliser in an eventual 2–1 win away to Pyramids on 6 February. In August 2021, Badji joined French club Amiens on a one-year loan with an option to buy.

On 31 January 2024, Badji was loaned to Gaziantep.

On 12 August 2024, Badji signed for Ligue 2 club Red Star. On 30 July 2025, he signed for Sivasspor.

On 8 September 2026, Badji signed for Super League Greece club Levadiakos on a free transfer.

== International career ==
Badji has represented Senegal at U20 level, he scored 12 goals in 12 caps prior to participating in the 2017 Africa U-20 Cup of Nations in Zambia; he scored one goal (in the semi-final versus Guinea U20) as Senegal went onto finish as runners-up. He also appeared for Senegal at the 2017 FIFA U-20 World Cup in South Korea.

== Career statistics ==
As of 1 July 2025

Appearances and goals by club, season, and competition
Club	Season	League			Cup		Continental		Other		Total	
Club	Season	Division	Apps	Goals	Apps	Goals	Apps	Goals	Apps	Goals	Apps	Goals
Djurgårdens IF	2017	Allsvenskan	20	3	1	2	—		—		21	5
Djurgårdens IF	2018	Allsvenskan	28	8	3	0	2 (Note: Appearances in the UEFA Europa League)	2	—		33	10
Djurgårdens IF	Total		48	11	4	2	2	2	—		54	15
Rapid Wien	2018–19	Austrian Football Bundesliga	13	5	2	0	—		3 (Note: Appearances in the 2018–19 Austrian Football Bundesliga Europa League play-offs)	1	18	6
Rapid Wien	2019–20	Austrian Football Bundesliga	16	3	0	0	—		—		16	3
Rapid Wien	Total		29	8	2	0	—		3	1	34	9
Al Ahly	2019–20	Egyptian Premier League	18	4	2	0	4 (Note: Appearances in the CAF Champions League)	0	1 (Note: Appearance in the Egyptian Super Cup)	0	25	4
Ankaragücü (loan)	2020–21	Süper Lig	13	3	0	0	—		—		13	3
Amiens (loan)	2021–22	Ligue 2	26	13	5	1	—		—		31	14
Amiens	2022–23	Ligue 2	3	0	0	0	—		—		3	0
Bordeaux (loan)	2022–23	Ligue 2	29	4	3	1	—		—		32	5
Bordeaux	2023–24	Ligue 2	12	0	3	0	—		—		15	0
Gaziantep (loan)	2023–24	TFF 1. Lig	14	1	1	0	—		—		15	1
Red Star	2024–25	Ligue 2	30	7	0	0	—		—		30	7
Sivasspor	2025–26	TFF 1. Lig	0	0	0	0	—		—		0	0
Career totals			222	51	20	4	6	2	4	1	252	58

== Honours ==
Djurgårdens IF

- Svenska Cupen: 2017–18

Al Ahly

- CAF Champions League: 2019–20
- Egypt Cup: 2019–20
- Egyptian Premier League: 2019-20
