= Grégory Poirier =

French football manager (born 1982)

Personal information
- Date of birth: 9 July 1982 (age 44)
- Place of birth: La Rochelle, France
- Height: 1.88 m (6 ft 2 in)
- Position: Midfielder

Team information
- Current team: Nantes (head coach)

Senior career*
Years	Team	Apps	(Gls)
2002–2003	La Rochelle		
2003–2004	Entente Perrier Vergèze		
2004–2009	Arles		
2009–2010	Nîmes	5	(0)
2010–2013	Amiens	34	(0)

Managerial career
- 2016–2017: Arles-Avignon
- 2017–2019: Marseille Endoume
- 2019–2020: Saint-Malo
- 2020: Sedan
- 2021–2024: Martigues
- 2024–2026: Red Star
- 2026–: Nantes
- * Club domestic league appearances and goals

Grégory Poirier (born 9 July 1982) is a French professional football manager and former player. As a player, he was a midfielder. As a manager, he won two consecutive promotions with Marseille Endoume from Régional 1 to Championnat National 2, and two more with Martigues from Championnat National 2 to Ligue 2. He is currently the manager of Ligue 2 side Nantes.

== Managerial career ==
Poirier was a youth coach at Arles-Avignon before being named first-team manager in 2016, aged 34. In March 2017, he took over at Marseille Endoume, and led them to consecutive promotions from the sixth-tier Régional 1 to the fourth-tier Championnat National 2.

In June 2019, Poirier signed with Saint-Malo in the same league. He resigned the following May with one year left on his contract; the season had been abandoned due to the COVID-19 pandemic, with his team in 9th. He immediately moved to Sedan, where he was tasked with winning promotion to the Championnat National. Having won once and drawn five times in seven games, he was sacked in December 2020, more than one month into another COVID-related hiatus.

In May 2021, Poirier returned to Provence to manage Martigues in the fourth tier. He won promotion in his first season, ending a decade-long exile from the Championnat National. Martigues finished the 2023–24 Championnat National as runners-up to Red Star, thus returning to Ligue 2 for the first time in 22 years.

On 4 June 2024, Poirier succeeded Habib Beye as manager of Red Star. In his second season, Poirier led Red Star to Ligue 1 promotion play-offs, but they were eliminated by Rodez, despite leading 1–0 and 2–1. He left Red Star as his contract expired in June 2026.

On 25 August 2026, Poirier became head coach of FC Nantes.
