= Jean-Luc Girard =

French footballer and manager (born 1965)

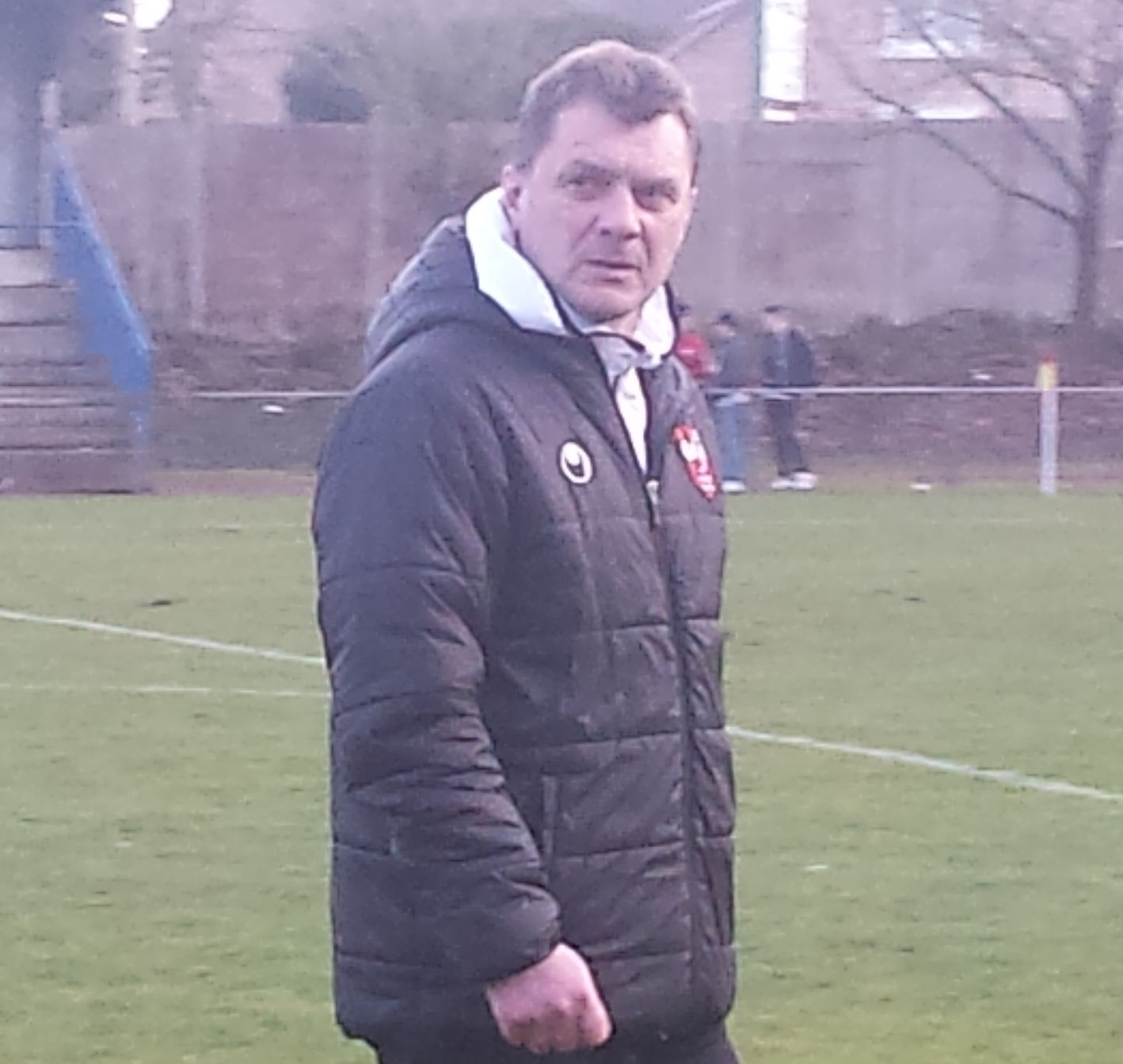

Personal information
- Full name: Jean-Luc Girard
- Date of birth: 22 November 1965 (age 60)
- Place of birth: Paris, France
- Position: Midfielder

Senior career*
Years	Team	Apps	(Gls)
1984–1986	Paris Saint-Germain	1	(0)
1986–1997	Red Star	267	(18)
Total		268	(18)

Managerial career
- 1998–1999: Red Star
- 2000: Red Star
- 2001–2002: Red Star
- 2004–2006: Red Star
- 2006–2007: Pau
- 2011–2014: Moissy
- 2014–2015: Ivry
- * Club domestic league appearances and goals

Jean-Luc Girard (born 22 November 1965) is a French football manager and former player who played as a midfielder in Ligue 1 and Ligue 2 before managing in Ligue 2.

== Career ==
Born in Paris, Girard began playing football with Paris Saint-Germain. After making only one Ligue 1 appearance over two seasons, he joined local rivals Red Star where he would play until the end of his career in 1997.

After he retired from playing, Girard became a football manager, leading his former club Red Star on several occasions. He has also managed amateurs Pau FC, US Sénart-Moissy and US Ivry.
