= Josué Escartin =

French footballer (born 2003)

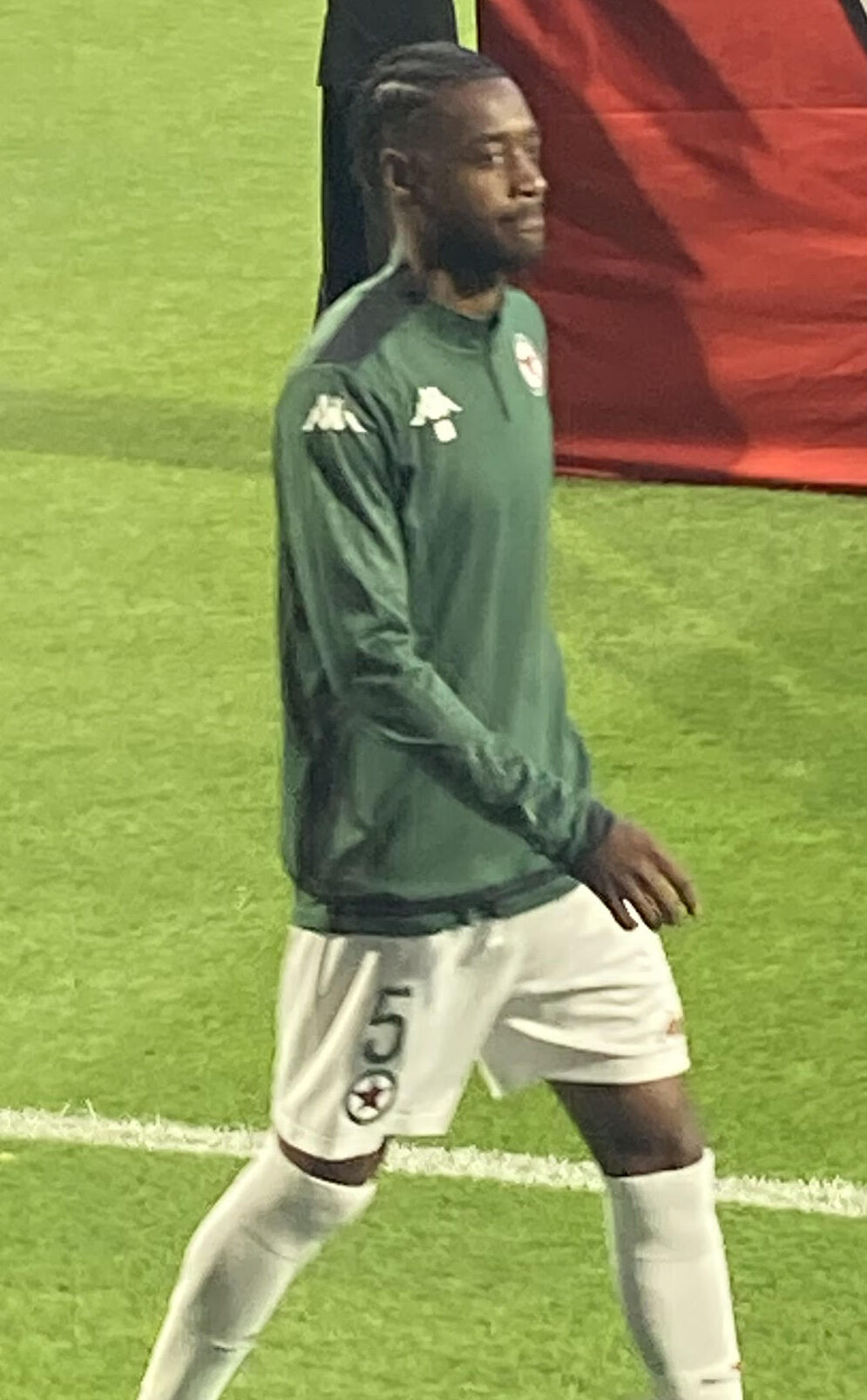
- Escartin with Red Star in 2024

Personal information
- Date of birth: 21 March 2003 (age 23)
- Place of birth: Fleury-les-Aubrais, France
- Height: 1.93 m (6 ft 4 in)
- Position: Centre-back

Team information
- Current team: Red Star
- Number: 5

Youth career
- 2008–2015: CJF Fleury-les-Aubrais
- 2015–2018: Saran
- 2018–2022: Brest

Senior career*
Years	Team	Apps	(Gls)
2020–2024	Brest B	33	(4)
2022–2023	→ Borgo (loan)	12	(0)
2024	→ Ajaccio (loan)	3	(0)
2024	→ Ajaccio B (loan)	7	(0)
2024–	Red Star	37	(1)
- * Club domestic league appearances and goals as of 11 May 2026

Josué Escartin (born 21 March 2003) is a French professional footballer who plays as a centre-back for Ligue 2 club Red Star.

== Club career ==
Born in Fleury-les-Aubrais in the Loiret department, Escartin began playing football at his hometown club CJF Fleury-les-Aubrais before joining Saran in 2015. After three seasons, he joined the academy of professional club Brest, where he would establish himself in the under-19 side of the club that reached the semi-finals of the Championnat National U19 in 2022. On 9 August 2022, Escartin signed his first professional contract with Brest. Twenty-four hours later, he joined Championnat National club Borgo on a season-long loan. However, his loan was cut short in January, after he had made fourteen appearances.

In January 2024, Escartin was loaned out to Ligue 2 club Ajaccio for the rest of the season, having made no appearances with Brest's first team in the previous twelve months. According to himself, he joined the club in order to "find more game time". He went on to make three Ligue 2 appearances for the club. On 11 August 2024, Escartin joined newly-promoted Ligue 2 club Red Star.

== International career ==
In 2022, Escartin was called up by the France under-19 national team by Landry Chauvin, only making appearances in unofficial friendlies against club reserve teams.

== Personal life ==
Escartin is of Congolese descent from the Republic of the Congo through his mother.
