= Vincent Bordot =

French footballer (born 1975)

Personal information
- Date of birth: 9 April 1975 (age 51)
- Place of birth: Coulaines, France
- Position: Midfielder

Senior career*
Years	Team	Apps	(Gls)
1997–1999	Le Mans B		
1998–1999	Le Mans	8	(0)
1999–2000	Thouars		
2000–2001	Tours		
2001–2003	Paris FC		
2003–2004	Beauvais		
2004–2005	Paris FC		
2005–2009	Saint-Pryvé		

Managerial career
- 2007–2011: Saint-Pryvé
- 2011–2019: Entente
- 2019–2021: Red Star
- 2022–2023: Paris 13 Atletico
- * Club domestic league appearances and goals

Vincent Bordot (born 9 April 1975) is a French football manager and former player. A midfielder, he played eight games in Ligue 2 for Le Mans at the start of his career before representing clubs in lower divisions.

As a manager, he led Entente to promotion to the Championnat National in an eight-year spell, eliminating Montpellier of Ligue 1 from the Coupe de France in 2019 before being relegated and leaving. With Red Star, he eliminated top-flight Nantes in a run to the last 16 of the cup in 2021 before being sacked that September.

== Playing career ==
Born in Coulaines, near Le Mans in Sarthe, Bordot got his break in football when Marc Westerloppe saw him play in a Division d'Honneur match for his local team and gave him a trial for Le Mans FC's reserve team in the fifth-tier CFA 2. Bordot frustrated the club for his lack of commitment, but Westerloppe gave him one last chance, and gave him his professional debut on 29 April 1998 in a Ligue 2 game against OGC Nice.

Bordot left Le Mans in 1999 for Thouars Foot 79 of the third-tier Championnat National, followed by Tours FC, then Paris FC in the CFA, AS Beauvais in the National and Saint-Pryvé Saint-Hilaire FC in CFA 2. He moved to Paris because of his wife's work, and was signed by Paris FC in 2001 after sending them a curriculum vitae; in his first season there he was made captain by manager Robert Buigues.

== Managerial career ==
=== Entente ===
Bordot began managing at age 32 in 2007, at Saint-Pryvé, followed by joining Entente SSG in 2011. His team were promoted to the Championnat National in 2017. On 2 December 2018, his team won 3–2 at home to Paris FC – ranked 4th in Ligue 2 – in the 8th round of the Coupe de France.

On 5 January 2019, Bordot's Entente won 1–0 at home to Montpellier HSC – 4th in Ligue 1 – in the last 64 of the cup. A month later they fell in the next round by a single goal at home to FC Nantes, also of the top flight. The 2018–19 Championnat National season ended with relegation; his last home game was a 4–1 loss to Pau FC.

=== Red Star ===
Remaining in the third tier, Bordot signed a two-year contract at Red Star F.C. in June 2019. On 6 March 2021, he led them to a 3–2 win at home to top-flight RC Lens in the last 32 of the cup. In the next round on 8 April against Olympique Lyonnais at the Stade Bauer, his team overcame a 2–0 half-time deficit to take the game to extra time, then lost 5–4 on penalties.

After a 6–0 loss at FC Annecy on 10 September 2021, Bordot was removed from his post at Red Star six games into the season.

=== Paris 13 Atletico ===
In October 2022, Bordot was hired at Paris 13 Atletico, who had won once in their first nine games of the 2022–23 Championnat National. He won two and lost five of his 11 league matches before his dismissal in February 2023; the team slipped one league place to 17th in his tenure.

== Personal life ==
Bordot said in 2022 that he was tired of being incorrectly referred to as a Parisian manager, having spent all of his managerial career in the capital city's region. He indicated that he was born far from the city and had spent most of his playing career away from it, having moved there only because of his ex-wife. He also said that he was approached by Annecy and US Orléans in 2021.
