= Jonathan Rivas =

French footballer (born 1992)

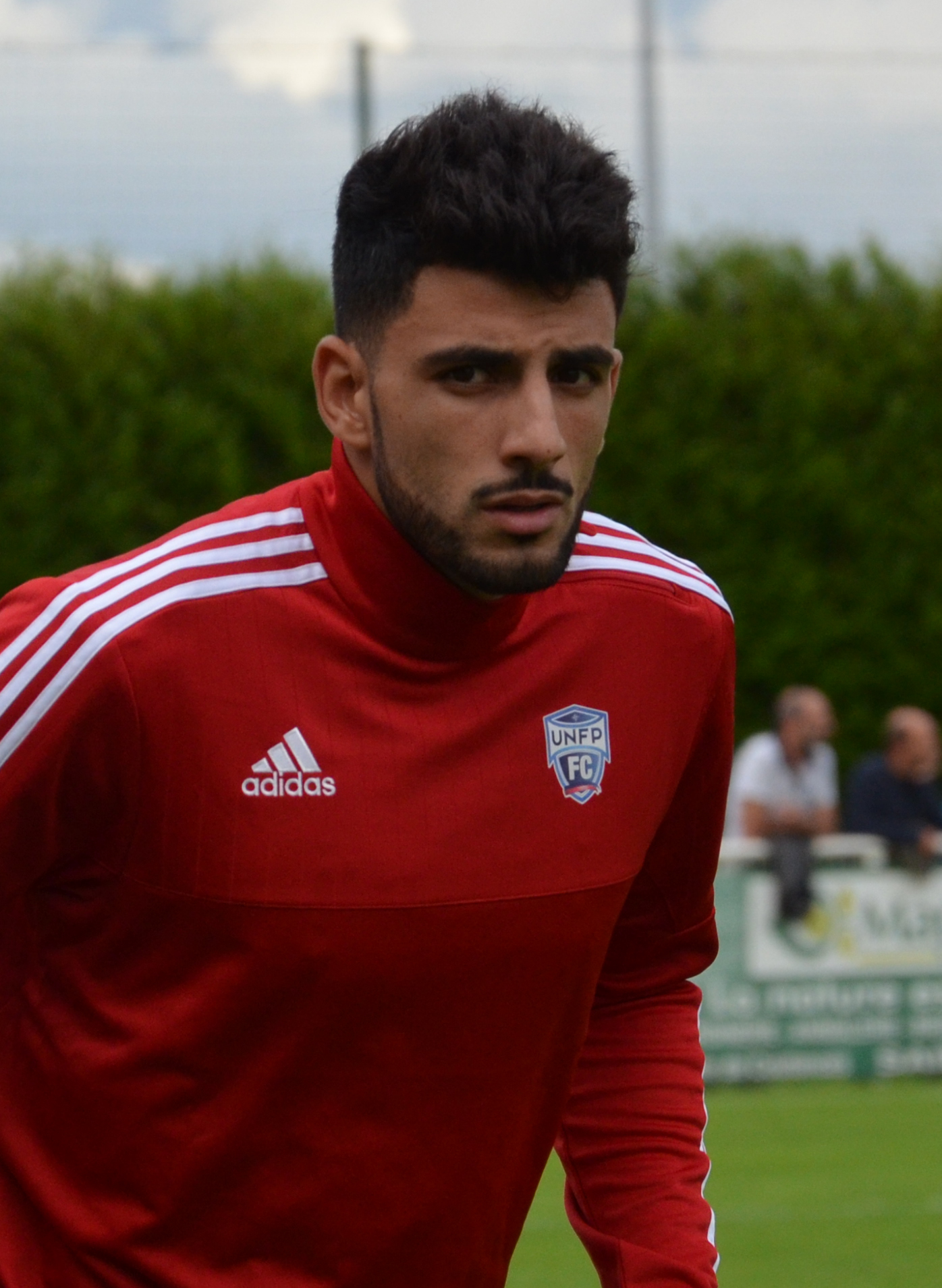
- Rivas in 2016

Personal information
- Full name: Jonathan Angelito Salah Rivas-Marouani
- Date of birth: 25 January 1992 (age 34)
- Place of birth: La Seyne-sur-Mer, France
- Height: 1.84 m (6 ft 0 in)
- Position: Forward

Team information
- Current team: Fleury
- Number: 9

Senior career*
Years	Team	Apps	(Gls)
2012–2015	Châteauroux B	39	(18)
2013–2015	Châteauroux	15	(0)
2014	→ CA Bastia (loan)	17	(2)
2015–2016	Clermont	14	(0)
2016	→ Les Herbiers (loan)	9	(3)
2016–2018	Pau	67	(21)
2018–2021	SC Lyon	72	(23)
2021–2023	Bourg-en-Bresse	50	(11)
2023–2024	Nancy	15	(4)
2024–	Fleury	57	(10)
- * Club domestic league appearances and goals as of 23 June 2026

Jonathan Angelito Salah Rivas-Marouani (born 25 January 1992) is a French professional footballer who plays as a forward for Ligue 3 club Fleury.

== Club career ==
Born in La Seyne-sur-Mer, Rivas trained with Club de Bourges, winning the national U14 championship with the club. He spent two years at the training centre of Chamois Niortais before joining the Châteauroux, where he spent five years. He made his debut for the senior team on 26 April 2013, in a 0–0 Ligue 2 game against Auxerre. He signed his first professional contract with the club in the summer of 2013. In January 2014, he joined CA Bastia until the end of the 2013–14 season, in order to secure more game time. He scored his first senior goal whilst on loan at CA Bastia, the only goal in a 1–0 Ligue 2 win against Nancy on 17 January 2014.

In January 2015, Rivas left Châteauroux, signing an eighteen-month contract with Clermont. After having only made four league appearances in the first half of the 2015–16 season, he agreed to leave Clermont on a loan deal with Les Herbiers until the end of the season.

Rivas left Clermont at the end of his contract, and after a trial joined Pau in September 2016. After two seasons during which he played the majority of Championnat National games, in June 2018 he joined Lyon-Duchère (which rebranded to SC Lyon in June 2020).

On 22 November 2021, Rivas moved to Bourg-en-Bresse.

On 20 November 2023, Rivas joined Championnat National club Nancy.

== Personal life ==
Rivas was born in France to a Spanish father and a Tunisian mother.

== Career statistics ==
As of match played 22 January 2021

Appearances and goals by club, season and competition
Club	Season	League			Coupe de France		Coupe de la Ligue		Other		Total	
Club	Season	Division	Apps	Goals	Apps	Goals	Apps	Goals	Apps	Goals	Apps	Goals
Châteauroux II	2012–13	CFA 2	22	13	—		—		—		22	13
Châteauroux II	2013–14	CFA 2	9	4	—		—		—		9	4
Châteauroux II	2014–15	CFA 2	8	1	—		—		—		8	1
Châteauroux II	Total		39	18	—		—		0	0	39	18
Châteauroux	2012–13	Ligue 2	5	0	0	0	0	0	—		5	0
Châteauroux	2013–14	Ligue 2	4	0	0	0	0	0	—		4	0
Châteauroux	2014–15	Ligue 2	6	0	1	0	1	0	—		8	0
Châteauroux	Total		15	0	1	0	1	0	0	0	17	0
CA Bastia (loan)	2013–14	Ligue 2	17	2	1	0	0	0	—		18	2
Clermont II	2014–15	CFA 2	1	1	—		—		—		1	1
Clermont II	2015–16	CFA 2	5	2	—		—		—		5	2
Clermont II	Total		6	3	—		—		0	0	6	3
Clermont	2014–15	Ligue 2	10	0	—		—		—		10	0
Clermont	2015–16	Ligue 2	4	0	1	0	2	0	—		7	0
Clermont	Total		14	0	1	0	2	0	0	0	17	0
Les Herbiers (loan)	2015–16	National	9	3	—		—		—		9	3
Pau II	2017–18	National 3	1	0	—		—		—		1	0
Pau	2016–17	National	23	2	1	0	—		—		24	2
Pau	2017–18	National	31	7	0	0	—		—		31	7
Pau	Total		54	9	1	0	0	0	0	0	55	9
Lyon-Duchère	2018–19	National	29	7	5	2	0	0	0	0	34	9
Lyon-Duchère	2019–20	National	20	13	0	0	0	0	0	0	20	13
Sporting Club Lyon	2020–21	National	18	1	0	0	0	0	0	0	18	1
Sporting Club Lyon	Total (SC Lyon under both names) (Note: Sporting Club Lyon was called AS Lyon-Duchère until June 2020.)		67	21	5	2	0	0	0	0	62	23
Career total			222	56	9	2	3	0	0	0	234	58
