= Mehdi Baaloudj =

Algerian footballer (born 2001)

Personal information
- Date of birth: 2 February 2001 (age 25)
- Place of birth: Melun, France
- Height: 1.89 m (6 ft 2 in)
- Position: Forward

Youth career
- 2008–2012: Dammarie Les Lys FC
- 2012–2015: Fontainebleau
- 2015–2016: Fleury
- 2016–2017: Le Mée SF
- 2017–2018: Sedan

Senior career*
Years	Team	Apps	(Gls)
2018–2020	Marseille II	26	(4)
2021	Sainte-Geneviève	0	(0)
2021–2023	Guingamp II	32	(15)
2022–2023	Guingamp	9	(0)
2023	→ Martigues (loan)	15	(3)
2023–2024	Versailles	27	(8)
2024–2025	Clermont	25	(2)
2025–2026	Rodez	18	(1)

International career^{‡}
2020	Algeria U20	2	(0)
- * Club domestic league appearances and goals as of 28 August 2026 ‡ National team caps and goals as of 04:36, 4 August 2022 (UTC)

Mehdi Baaloudj (Arabic: مهدي بعلوج; born 2 February 2001) is a professional footballer who plays as a forward. Born in France, he is a youth international for Algeria.

== Career ==
Baaloudj is a product of the youth academies of Dammarie Les Lys FC, Fontainebleau, Fleury, Le Mée SF, and Sedan. He began his senior career with the reserves of Marseille, but was controversially released by the club in December 2020 after an international callup with the Algeria U20s, where questions were raised regarding COVID-19 protocols. He moved to Sainte-Geneviève for a couple of months where he couldn't play, before transferring to the reserves of Guingamp in the summer of 2021. In his debut season with Guingamp II for 2021-22 he scored 10 goals in 26 games, and was offered a professional contract with the club. On 10 June 2022, he signed the professional contract with Guingamp for 2 seasons. He made his senior debut with Guingamp in a 4–0 Ligue 2 win over Pau FC on 28 July 2022, coming on as a substitute in the 84th minute.

On 16 January 2023, Baaloudj was loaned to Martigues in Championnat National.

On 30 August 2023, Baaloudj signed a two-year deal with Versailles.

On 2 September 2024, he moved to Clermont in Ligue 2 on a one-season deal.

On 2 July 2025, Baaloudj joined Rodez in Ligue 2 with a three-year contract. On 3 September 2026, his contract with Rodez was mutually terminated.

== International career ==
Born in France, Baaloudj is of Algerian descent. He represented the Algeria U20s twice in a call-up in November 2020.
