= Dylan Durivaux =

French footballer (born 2001)

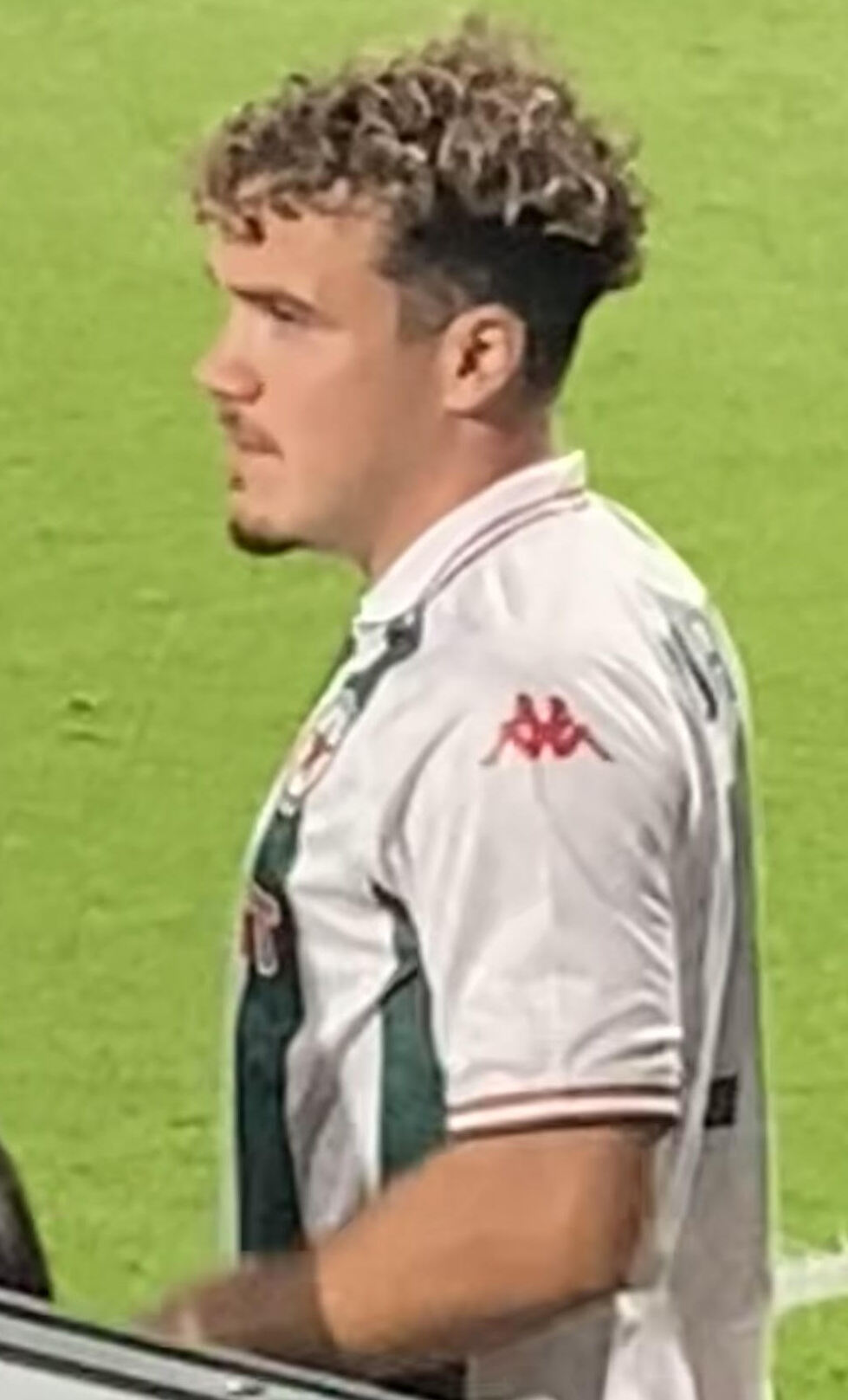
- Durivaux with Red Star in 2024

Personal information
- Date of birth: 18 June 2001 (age 25)
- Place of birth: Cannes, France
- Height: 1.78 m (5 ft 10 in)
- Position: Right-back

Team information
- Current team: Red Star
- Number: 20

Youth career
- 2007–2013: Andrézieux
- 2013–2020: Saint-Étienne

Senior career*
Years	Team	Apps	(Gls)
2018–2020	Saint-Étienne B	16	(0)
2020–2022	Guingamp B	22	(0)
2022–2023	Niort B	4	(1)
2022–2024	Niort	53	(3)
2024–	Red Star	62	(1)

International career
2020	France U19	1	(0)
- * Club domestic league appearances and goals as of 11 May 2026

Dylan Durivaux (French pronunciation: [dilan dyʁivo]; born 18 June 2001) is a French professional footballer who plays as a right-back for Ligue 2 club Red Star.

== Club career ==
Durivaux came through the academy of Saint-Étienne. He won the Coupe Gambardella with the club's under-19 side in 2019. After having played for the Saint-Étienne and Guingamp reserve sides, he signed for Ligue 2 club Niort on 19 July 2022 on a two-year contract. After the club suffered relegation to the Championnat National, Durivaux managed to establish himself as an important first team player in the 2023–24 season.

On 25 July 2024, Durivaux signed for newly-promoted Ligue 2 club Red Star.

== International career ==
Durivaux is a former under-19 international for France, appearing in a 3–1 friendly win over Portugal on 25 February 2020.

== Honours ==
Saint-Étienne U19

- Coupe Gambardella: 2018–19
