= Samuel Renel =

Martiniquais footballer (born 2001)

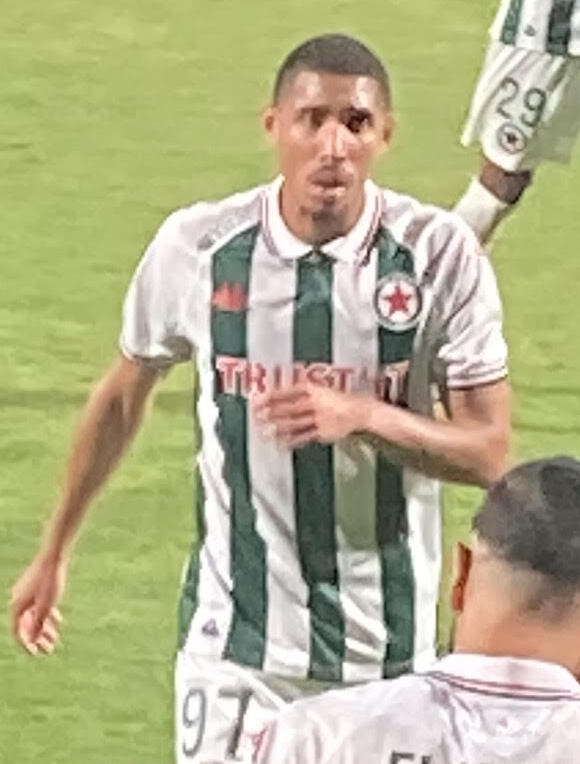
- Renel with Red Star in 2024

Personal information
- Date of birth: 3 November 2001 (age 25)
- Place of birth: Fort-de-France, Martinique, France
- Height: 1.78 m (5 ft 10 in)
- Position: Midfielder

Team information
- Current team: Red Star

Youth career
- 2008–2014: Excelsior Fort de France
- 2014–2016: Sportif 2 Coeur
- 2016–2019: Marseille

Senior career*
Years	Team	Apps	(Gls)
2019	Marseille B	5	(0)
2019–2023	Niort B	29	(5)
2019–2024	Niort	85	(4)
2024–	Red Star	36	(1)
2026	→ Rouen (loan)	11	(0)

International career^{‡}
2023–	Martinique	3	(0)
- * Club domestic league appearances and goals as of 16 May 2026 ‡ National team caps and goals as of 28 August 2025

Samuel Renel (born 3 November 2001) is a Martiniquais professional footballer who plays as a midfielder for Ligue 2 club Red Star and the Martinique national team.

== Club career ==
On 7 August 2019, Renel signed a contract with Niort. He made his professional debut with Niort in a 1–1 Ligue 2 tie with Nancy on 6 March 2020.

== International career ==
Renel was called up to the senior Martinique national team for a set of matches in March 2023.

== Career statistics ==
As of matches played 1 February 2022

Appearances and goals by club, season and competition
Club	Season	League			Coupe de France		Coupe de la Ligue		Other		Total	
Club	Season	Division	Apps	Goals	Apps	Goals	Apps	Goals	Apps	Goals	Apps	Goals
Niort	2019–20	Ligue 2	1	0	2	0	0	0	—		3	0
Niort	2020–21	Ligue 2	3	0	1	0	— (Note: The Coupe de la Ligue was indefinitely suspended following the 2019–20 edition)		1 (Note: Matches played in the 2020–21 Ligue 2 relegation playoffs)	0	5	0
Niort	2021–22	Ligue 2	15	2	— (Note: Niort excluded from the 2021–22 Coupe de France)		—		—		15	2
Niort	Total		19	2	3	0	0	0	1	0	23	2
Career total			19	2	3	0	0	0	1	0	23	2
