= 2023–24 Championnat National =

Championnat National
- Season: 2023–24
- Dates: 11 August 2023 – 17 May 2024
- Champions: Red Star
- Promoted: Red Star; Martigues
- Relegated: Niort; GOAL FC; Avranches; Marignane GCB; Épinal; Cholet
- Matches: 203
- Goals: 506 (2.49 per match)
- Top goalscorer: 15 (Alan Kerouedan, Avranches; Diawoye Diarra; Marignane GCB)
- Biggest home win: Versailles 6–0 Nîmes; Game week 13, 10 November 2023
- Biggest away win: Villefranche 0–4 Niort; Game week 19, 2 February 2024; Villefranche 0–4 Le Mans; Game week 14 (rearranged), 27 February 2024
- Highest scoring: Dijon 5–2 Avranches; Game week 3, 25 August 2023
- Longest winning run: 7 (Red Star)
- Longest unbeaten run: 11 (Red Star)
- Longest winless run: 13 (Châteauroux)
- Longest losing run: 5 (Nîmes; Cholet)
- Highest attendance: 18,034; Le Mans 1–3 Nancy; Game week 15, 1 December 2023
- Lowest attendance: 104; Marignane GCB 1–1 Villefranche; Game week 20, 9 February 2024

The 2023–24 Championnat National season was the 31st since the establishment of the Championnat National and the 25th in its current format, which served as the third division of the French football league system. Two clubs were promoted to Ligue 2 and six relegated to Championnat National 2 after this season, as adjustment for the reduction in size of Ligue 2 from 20 teams to 18 next season. As a result, no promotion play-offs were held.

== Team changes ==
Team changes from 2022–23 Championnat National.

=== To National ===
Promoted from 2022–23 Championnat National 2

- Épinal
- GOAL FC
- Marignane GCB
- Rouen

Relegated from 2022–23 Ligue 2

- Dijon
- Nîmes
- Niort
- Sochaux (administrative relegation) (Note: As of the start of the season, the future status of Sochaux was still in dispute, and hence the season commenced without them. The FFF validated Sochaux's participation on 17 August 2023.)

=== From National ===
Relegated to 2022–23 Championnat National 2

- Borgo
- Bourg-Péronnas
- Le Puy
- Paris 13 Atletico
- Stade Briochin

Administratively relegated to Régional 3

- Sedan (Note: The administrative relegation of Sedan by the DNCG appeal committee was later confirmed by the CNOSF and the administrative court.)

Promoted to 2022–23 Ligue 2

- Concarneau
- Dunkerque

=== Stadia and locations ===
Location of teams in 2023–24 National

Club	Location	Venue	Capacity
Avranches	Avranches	Stade René Fenouillère	2,000
Châteauroux	Châteauroux	Stade Gaston Petit	17,173
Cholet	Cholet	Stade Pierre Blouen	9,000
Dijon	Dijon	Stade Gaston Gérard	15,995
Épinal	Épinal	Stade de la Colombière	8,000
GOAL FC	Chasselay	Stade Ludovic Giuly	5,000
Le Mans	Le Mans	MMArena	25,000
Marignane GCB	Marignane	Stade Saint-Exupéry	1,500
Martigues	Martigues	Stade Francis Turcan	8,290
Nancy	Nancy	Stade Marcel Picot	20,087
Nîmes	Nîmes	Stade des Costières	18,482
Niort	Niort	Stade René Gaillard	10,886
Orléans	Orléans	Stade de la Source	7,000
Red Star	Paris (Saint-Ouen)	Stade Bauer	10,000
Rouen	Rouen	Stade Robert Diochon	12,108
Sochaux	Montbéliard	Stade Auguste Bonal	20,005
Versailles	Paris (Paris 16)	Stade Jean-Bouin (Note: Stade de Montbauron is not of sufficient standard for Championnat National. Versailles will play their games at Stade Jean-Bouin.)	19,904
Villefranche	Villefranche-sur-Saône	Stade Armand Chouffet	3,500

=== Number of teams by regions ===
Teams	Region	Team(s)
2	Auvergne-Rhône-Alpes	GOAL FC and Villefranche
2	Centre-Val de Loire	Châteauroux and Orléans
2	Grand Est	Épinal and Nancy
2	Île-de-France	Versailles and Red Star
2	Normandy	Avranches and Rouen
2	Pays de la Loire	Cholet and Le Mans
2	Provence-Alpes-Côte d'Azur	Marignane GCB and Martigues
2	Bourgogne-Franche-Comté	Dijon and Sochaux
1	Nouvelle-Aquitaine	Niort
1	Occitanie	Nîmes

== League table ==
Pos	Team	Pld	W	D	L	GF	GA	GD	Pts	Promotion or relegation
1	Red Star (C, P)	34	19	8	7	55	34	+21	65	Promotion to Ligue 2
2	Martigues (P)	34	17	8	9	44	29	+15	59	Promotion to Ligue 2
3	Niort (D, R)	34	17	7	10	58	42	+16	58	Administrative relegation to Régional 1
4	Dijon	34	15	9	10	50	41	+9	54	
5	Le Mans	34	14	10	10	49	44	+5	52	
6	Nancy (Note: On 23 June 2023, the FFF announced a deduction of one point for Nancy, applicable to the 2023–24 season, due to incidents in the game against Bourg-Péronnas on the final day of the 2022–23 Championnat National season.)	34	14	9	11	51	46	+5	50	
7	Rouen (Note: On 28 November 2023, the DNCG announced a deduction of five points for Rouen, due to financial issues. The punishment was upheld on appeal.)	34	15	9	10	41	37	+4	49	
8	Sochaux	34	12	12	10	51	44	+7	48	
9	Versailles	34	12	11	11	41	33	+8	47	
10	Orléans	34	11	11	12	36	37	−1	44	
11	Nîmes	34	11	11	12	36	43	−7	44	
12	Châteauroux	34	10	12	12	41	44	−3	42	
13	Villefranche (Note: On 19 January 2024, the appeal commission of the FFF announced that Villefranche would have to replay games against Rouen, Avranches and Le Mans after fielding an ineligible player in the original fixtures. The three results were removed from the table.) (T)	34	10	11	13	36	43	−7	41	
14	GOAL FC (R)	34	10	8	16	43	47	−4	38	Relegation to Championnat National 2
15	Avranches (R)	34	11	5	18	37	59	−22	38	Relegation to Championnat National 2
16	Marignane GCB (R)	34	9	10	15	37	50	−13	37	Relegation to Championnat National 2
17	Épinal (R)	34	9	6	19	39	51	−12	33	Relegation to Championnat National 2
18	Cholet (D, R)	34	9	5	20	34	55	−21	32	Administrative relegation to Régional 3

Updated to match(es) played on 18 May 2024. Source: soccerway
Rules for classification: 1) head-to-head results; 2) head-to-head goal difference; 3) goal difference; 4) goals scored; 5) fair play points
(C) Champions; (D) Disqualified; (P) Promoted; (R) Relegated; (T) Qualified, but not yet for the particular phase indicated

== Top scorers ==
As of 18 May 2024.

Rank	Player	Club	Goals
1	(France) Alan Kerouedan	Avranches	15
1	(Mali) Diawoye Diarra	Marignane GCB	15
1	(France) Cheikh Touré	Nancy	15
2	(France) Nesta Elphege	Niort	13
2	(France) Hacène Benali	Red Star	12
3	(France) Esteban Lepaul	Épinal	12

== Attendances ==
FC Sochaux-Montbéliard drew the highest average home attendance in the 2023-24 edition of the Championnat National.

#	Football club	Home games	Average attendance
1	FC Sochaux-Montbéliard	17	10,382
2	AS Nancy-Lorraine	17	9,421
3	Le Mans FC	17	5,186
4	Dijon FCO	17	5,121
5	FC Rouen	17	4,901
6	Red Star FC	17	3,508
7	La Berrichonne de Châteauroux	17	2,904
8	US Orléans	17	2,781
9	Chamois Niortais	17	2,194
10	FC Martigues	17	1,949
11	FC Villefranche Beaujolais	17	1,778
12	Nîmes Olympique	17	1,635
13	FC Versailles	17	1,423
14	SAS Épinal	17	1,210
15	US Avranches	17	879
16	SO Cholet	17	558
17	GOAL FC	17	546
18	Marignane Gignac	17	264
