= Red Star FC =

French football club in Saint-Ouen-sur-Seine

Red Star Football Club
- Full name: Red Star Football Club
- Nicknames: L'Étoile rouge (The Red Star); Les verts et blancs (The Green and Whites); Les Audoniens (The Audonians)
- Founded: 21 February 1897; 129 years ago
- Stadium: Stade Bauer
- Capacity: 5,600
- Owner: A-CAP
- President: Patrice Haddad
- Head coach: Damien Perrinelle
- League: Ligue 2
- 2025–26: Ligue 2, 4th of 18
- Website: www.redstar.fr
Home colours	Away colours	Third colours

Red Star Football Club (French pronunciation: [ʁɛd staʁ futbol klœb]), commonly referred to as Red Star FC or simply Red Star, is a French professional football club founded in Paris in 1897. The club plays its home matches at the Stade Bauer. They currently compete in Ligue 2, the second tier of French football, having been promoted from the third tier Championnat National at the end of the 2023–24 season. The club is the fourth oldest football club in France after Standard AC of Paris, Le Havre AC and Girondins de Bordeaux.

Despite the club's long spell under a semi-pro status, Red Star has a rich history. The club was founded in 1897 under the name Red Star Club Français by French football legend Jules Rimet. Rimet later went on to serve as president of both the French Football Federation and FIFA. The original FIFA World Cup Trophy was named in his honour. Red Star was one of the founding member clubs of Ligue 1 and has spent 19 seasons in the first division; the club's last top tier stint being in 1974–75. In cup competitions, the club has won five Coupe de France titles, which is tied for fifth-best among all French clubs.

While the club have enjoyed only modest success on the field, the club is widely recognised for its distinctive social culture. Red Star supporters are strongly identified with their support of left-wing politics, social activism and a party atmosphere they create at the club's matches.

The club was purchased by US-based private investment firm 777 Partners in May 2022, a move which saw demonstrations from fans leading to the postponement of a Championnat National match in April 2022. In August 2026, 777 Partners filed for Chapter 11 bankruptcy in an effort to eliminate the majority of its $2 billion debt.

== History ==
=== Early history ===
Red Star Football Club was founded on 21 February 1897 in a Parisian café by Jules Rimet and Ernest Weber under the name Red Star Club Français. The derivation of the name is uncertain; it is possibly taken from the red star of Buffalo Bill or possibly in reference to Miss Jenny, a British governess based in Paris who was adopted as the godmother of the club, who recommended the club be named after the historic shipping line, the Red Star Line. Upon its creation, Rimet installed Jean de Piessac as club president and one of his younger brothers as club secretary. The club was officially inaugurated on 12 March 1897 after Rimet signed the club's statutes and sent them to the USFSA, which, during this time, served as the head of French football. Members of the club were required to pay ₣100 a month to help the club meet its daily quota. Red Star officially joined the USFSA in 1898 and was inserted into the third-tier of the association's football league system. In the club's infancy, the team played in navy blue and white at the Champ de Mars. However, soon after, Red Star moved to Meudon in Hauts-de-Seine playing on a terrace overlooking the Seine Valley. Midway through the year, de Piessac left his post as club president. Rimet quickly succeeded him and, by 1904, Red Star were playing in the first division of the USFSA league.

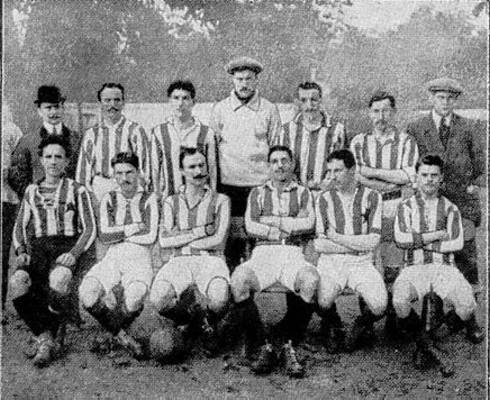
Red Star team in 1910

In 1907, Red Star changed its name to Red Star Amical Club after merging with Amical Football Club. Due to the merger, the club departed Meudon and moved to Grenelle in the 15th arrondissement. After three years in Grenelle, the club moved to Saint-Ouen in Seine-Saint-Denis to play in the newly built Stade de Paris. On 25 October 1909, the stadium was inaugurated following a match between Red Star and English club Old Westminsters. The stadium was later renamed to its present name today. With the USFSA becoming disorganised in the early 1900s, Red Star joined the newly created Ligue de Football Association (LFA) in 1910. In 1912, the club earned its first honour after winning the association's Ligue Nationale. In the same year, the club also finished runner-up to Étoile des Deux Lacs in the Trophée de France.

=== 1919–1975 ===
In 1919, the French Football Federation was created and months later, the Coupe de France. From 1920–34, Red Star embarked on a remarkable uprising in which the club won four Coupe de France titles, achieved professional status, and were founding members of the French Division 1. The club's first Coupe de France victory came in 1921, when the club, led by French internationals Pierre Chayriguès, Paul Nicolas, Juste Brouzes, Lucien Gamblin and Maurice Meyer, defeated Olympique de Paris 2–1, courtesy of goals from Marcel Naudin and Robert Clavel. In the ensuing two seasons, Red Star won back-to-back Coupe de France titles. In 1922, the club defeated Stade Rennais UC 2–0 and, in 1923, Red Star beat Cette 4–2 to complete the hat trick. In 1926, Red Star completed a second merger, this time with its local rivals Olympique de Paris whom it had defeated just five years ago in a Coupe de France final. Due to the merger, Red Star changed its name to Red Star Olympique and dropped its navy blue and white combination for a simple white blouse. In 1928, Red Star won its fourth Coupe de France title of the decade defeating CA Paris 3–1 at the Stade Olympique Yves-du-Manoir in Colombes.

In July 1930, the National Council of the French Football Federation voted 128–20 in support of professionalism in French football. Red Star were among the first clubs to adopt the new statute and, subsequently, became professional and were founding members of the new league. In the league's inaugural season, Red Star were relegated after finishing in the bottom three of its group. As a result, the club played the following season in the inaugural season of the Division 2. Red Star won the league and returned to the first division for the 1934–35 season. Following the club's return to Division 1, Red Star switched its colours from white to the green and white that exists today.

The club temporarily merged with Stade Français to form Stade Français-Red Star between 1948 and 1950. In 1967, they merged with Toulouse FC (not the current club) out of the latter club's financial reasons and bought Toulouse's place in the top division. The merged club last played in first division in the 1974–75 season.

=== Recent history ===
Red Star were relegated from Ligue 2 in 1999. In 1999–2000 they reached the semi-finals of the Coupe de la Ligue, losing to eventual champions Gueugnon. They were relegated to the fourth tier in 2001, thereby losing their professional status. A year later, the FFF sent them down another tier due to €1.5 million debts. From 2003 to 2005, Red Star played in the sixth-tier Division d'Honneur.

After a long spell in the lower leagues, following a successful 2014–15 campaign, the team won promotion to Ligue 2, the second tier of French football. In their first season back in Ligue 2, Red Star finished 5th on the table missing promotion to Ligue 1 by a single point. In the 2016–17 Ligue 2 season, Red Star finished 19th and were relegated back to the third division of French football.

Due to safety regulation issues with Stade Bauer, Red Star has been forced to play at different stadiums the past few seasons when in Ligue 2. They have employed Stade Jean-Bouin in the past and then used Stade Pierre Brisson located in Beauvais. Since returning to the third tier in 2019, the club has returned to playing home matches at Stade Bauer.

In 2018, Red Star were promoted back to Ligue 2 as champions of the Championnat National. They were relegated again the following season, finishing bottom of Ligue 2. Their relegation was confirmed on 27 April 2019 after losing 2–1 to champions FC Metz.

=== Divisional movements of Red Star ===
Red Star Football Club 93 logo from 2001-2010.

(Italics indicates winning seasons)

- Ligue 1: 1932–33, 1934–38, 1939–50, 1965–66, 1967–73, 1974–75
- Ligue 2: 1933–34, 1938–39, 1952–60, 1961–65, 1966–67, 1973–74, 1975–78, 1982–87, 1989–99, 2015–17, 2018–19, 2024–
- Third Level: 1950–52, 1960–61, 1981–82, 1987–89, 1999–01, 2011–15, 2017–18, 2019–2024
- Fourth Level: 1980–81, 2001–02, 2006–11
- Fifth Level: 1978–80, 2002–03, 2005–06
- Sixth Level: 2003–05

=== Name changes ===
- Red Star Club Français (1897–04)
- Red Star Amical Club (1904–25)
- Red Star Olympique (1925–44)
- Red Star Olympique Audonien (1944–46)
- Stade Français-Red Star (1946–48)
- Red Star Olympique Audonien (1948–55)
- Red Star Football Club (1955–66)
- AS Red Star (1976–82)
- AS Red Star 93 (1982–01)
- Red Star Football Club 93 (2001–10)
- Red Star Football Club (2010–)

== Club identity and supporters ==
The club has relatively modest but loyal support, mostly centered around Saint-Ouen and the northern suburbs of Paris. Overtly antifascist, most of the fans are left-wing, and the club identifies itself as a banlieue working-class club. Despite statements to the contrary, Red Stars' left-wing association did not originate at its founding in 1897, but developed over time due to its working-class population of Saint-Ouen and its cultural positioning in opposition to the commercialised model of clubs like Paris Saint-Germain. The club's name predates the Russian Revolution and had no connection to communism. Nevertheless, over time, the "Red Star" name and the club's location attracted left-wing supporters. In the modern era, the club has been referred to as "France's only openly communist club". In 2015, French President François Hollande of the Socialist Party visited Red Star's museum, seeking to drum up support from amongst Red Star's left-wing fans.

Average attendances in the 2020s have been consistently above 3000 spectators per match, with many home games sold out.

The club has several ultras groups; "Red Star Fans", "Gang Green", "Perry Boys" and the smaller "Splif Brothers".

The fans have a long-standing friendship with "Red Kaos" of Grenoble.

Red Star have rivalries with fellow Parisian derby rivals; with US Créteil and a fierce rivalry with Paris FC.

== Youth system ==
Red Star unearthed several talented players during its early existence, most notably Paul Nicolas, who spent nine years at the club, Nicolas later became a catalyst towards the development of professional football in France and was partly responsible for the creation of the Ligue de Football Professionnel. Football manager Roger Lemerre started his managerial career with the club before leading France to titles at UEFA Euro 2000 and the 2001 FIFA Confederations Cup.

Red Star's youth academy was once very productive. The likes of Alex Song, Moussa Sissoko and Abou Diaby, all renowned players in English football, came through the club's youth system. As a matter of fact, no less than five players at the 2014 World Cup had played in the club's youth teams. Nevertheless, during the years spent in lower amateur divisions, the loss of professional status led to the dismantling of the youth academy setup, and although a project to rebuild it has been in the air for a few years, it has yet to be done despite the club's return to professional football.

== Players ==
=== Current squad ===
As of 8 September 2026.

Note: Flags indicate national team as defined under FIFA eligibility rules; some limited exceptions apply. Players may hold more than one non-FIFA nationality.

No.	Pos.	Nation	Player
1	GK	MAR	Yanis Benchaouch
2	DF	SUI	Théo Magnin
3	DF	FRA	Matthieu Huard
4	DF	FRA	Elyaz Zidane
5	DF	FRA	Josué Escartin
6	DF	FRA	Bradley Danger
7	FW	FRA	Damien Durand
8	MF	FRA	Guillaume Trani
9	FW	SUI	Ilija Despotovic
10	MF	TUN	Saîf-Eddine Khaoui
11	FW	FRA	Kémo Cissé
12	DF	MLI	Sékou Guindo
14	MF	FRA	Mahamadou Diawara (on loan from Lyon)

No.	Pos.	Nation	Player
16	GK	FRA	Gaëtan Poussin
17	MF	MTQ	Samuel Renel
19	MF	FRA	Islam Halifa
20	DF	FRA	Dylan Durivaux
21	MF	FRA	Idrissa Sabaly (on loan from Strasbourg)
23	FW	FRA	Jovany Ikanga
24	DF	FRA	Pierre Lemonnier
25	DF	POR	Leonardo Buta
27	FW	FRA	Godson Kyeremeh
45	MF	CIV	Cheick Konaté
80	DF	FRA	Côme Bianay Balcot (on loan from Torino)
91	FW	FRA	Kévin Cabral

=== Out on loan ===
Note: Flags indicate national team as defined under FIFA eligibility rules; some limited exceptions apply. Players may hold more than one non-FIFA nationality.

No.	Pos.	Nation	Player
—	FW	FRA	Abdelsamad Hachem (on loan to Virton)

=== Notable players ===
Below are the notable former players who have represented Red Star in league and international competition since the club's foundation in 1897. To appear in the section below, a player must have played in at least 100 official matches for the club or have played for his country's team.

For a complete list of Red Star players, see Category:Red Star FC players.

- (France) Alfred Aston
- (France) David Bellion
- (France) Philippe Bonnardel
- (France) Jean-Claude Bras
- (France) Juste Brouzes
- (France) Augustin Chantrel
- (France) Pierre Chayriguès
- (France) Émilien Devic
- (France) Marcel Domergue
- (France) Lucien Gamblin
- (France) Alfred Gindrat
- (France) Jean-Luc Girard
- (France) François Hugues
- (France) Eugène Langenove
- (Algeria) Nasser Bouiche
- (France) Christian Laudu
- (France) Eugène Maës
- (France) Steve Marlet
- (France) Guilherme Mauricio
- (France) Georges Meuris
- (France) Maurice Meyer
- (France) Pol Morel
- (France) Paul Nicolas
- (France) Marcel Pinel
- (France) Julien Du Rhéart
- (France) Jacky Simon
- (France) André Simonyi
- (France) Georges Stuttler
- (France) Peppe Moncef Chahboune
- (France) Alexis Thépot
- (France) Julien Verbrugge
- (Algeria) Lotfi Guellati
- (Argentina) Nestor Combin
- (Argentina) Guillermo Stábile
- (Argentina) Helenio Herrera
- (Haiti) Yves Desmarets
- (Madagascar) Stéphan Raheriharimanana
- (Sweden) Bror Mellberg
- (United States) Hugo Pérez
- (Soviet Union) Aleksandr Bubnov
- (Soviet Union) Fyodor Cherenkov
- (Socialist Federal Republic of Yugoslavia) Safet Sušić

== Management and staff ==
- Owner and President: Patrice Haddad
- Sporting Director: Reda Hammache
- Global Sports Director: Johannes Spors
- Head coach: Grégory Poirier
- Assistant Head coach: Sylvain Groseil, Pierre-Emmanuel Bourdeau
- Goalkeeper Coach: Faouzi Amzal
- Fitness Coach: Rodolphe Rothe-Boll
- Athletic Coach: Randy Fondelot
- Match Analyst: Brahim Merad
- Club Doctor: Alain Frey
- Osteopath: Quentin Janicot
- Medical department: Mohamed Kadi, Isabelle Meissner
- Masseur: Philippe Donin, Alexis Rebour, Thibaut Lacaze
- Head of Education: Vincent Doukantie
- Kit Manager: Christian Dubo, Osman Davison, Alain Giry, Nordine Guellai, Boualem Zeboudji
- Team Manager: Valentin Ries

=== Coaching history ===
Dates	Name
1911–12	Roland Richard
1934–35	Paul Baron
1935–39	(Argentina) Guillermo Stábile
1939	(France) Augustin Chantrel
1945–46	(France) Edmond Delfour
1946–47	Georges Villemin
1947–48	Auguste Jordan
1948–49	André Riou
1952–53	André Simonyi
1953	Eugène Proust
1953–55	Charles Nicolas
1955–56	Angelo Grizzetti
1956–58	Paul Baron
1958–59	Jean Prouff
1959–60	(Czechoslovakia) Georges Hanke
1960	André Simonyi
1960–61	Paul Baron
1961–69	Jean Avellaneda
1969–70	Ladislas Nagy
1970–72	Marcel Tomazover

Dates	Name
1972–74	(Argentina) José Farías
1974	André Merelle
1974–75	Marcel Tomazover
1975–78	Roger Lemerre
1978–79	(Paraguay) Carlos Monín
1979–80	Claude Dubaële
1980–85	Georges Eo
1985–86	Roger Lemerre
1986–87	Gérard Laurent
1987–89	Philippe Troussier
1989	Bernard Maligorne
1989–90	Patrice Lecornu
1990	Henri Depireux
1990–91	Michel Rouquette
1991–95	Robert Herbin
1995–96	Pierre Repellini
1996–97	(Algeria) Abdel Djaadaoui
1997–98	Jean Sérafin
1998–00	Jean-Luc Girard
2000	Jacky Lemée

Dates	Name
2000–01	Jean-Luc Girard
2001	Pierre Repellini
2001–02	Jean-Luc Girard
2002–03	Mustapha Ousfane
2003–04	Azzedine Meguellatti
2004–06	Jean-Luc Girard
2006–08	Bruno Naidon
2008–09	François Ciccolini
2009	David Giguet
2009–11	Alain Mboma
2011	Athos Bandini
2013	Laurent Fournier
2013–15	Sébastien Robert
2015–16	(Portugal) Rui Almeida
2017	Claude Robin
2017–18	Régis Brouard
2018–19	(Bosnia and Herzegovina) Faruk Hadžibegić
2019	Vincent Doukantié (interim)
2019–21	Vincent Bordot
2021–24	(Senegal) Habib Beye
2024–present	Grégory Poirier

== Honours ==
=== Domestic ===
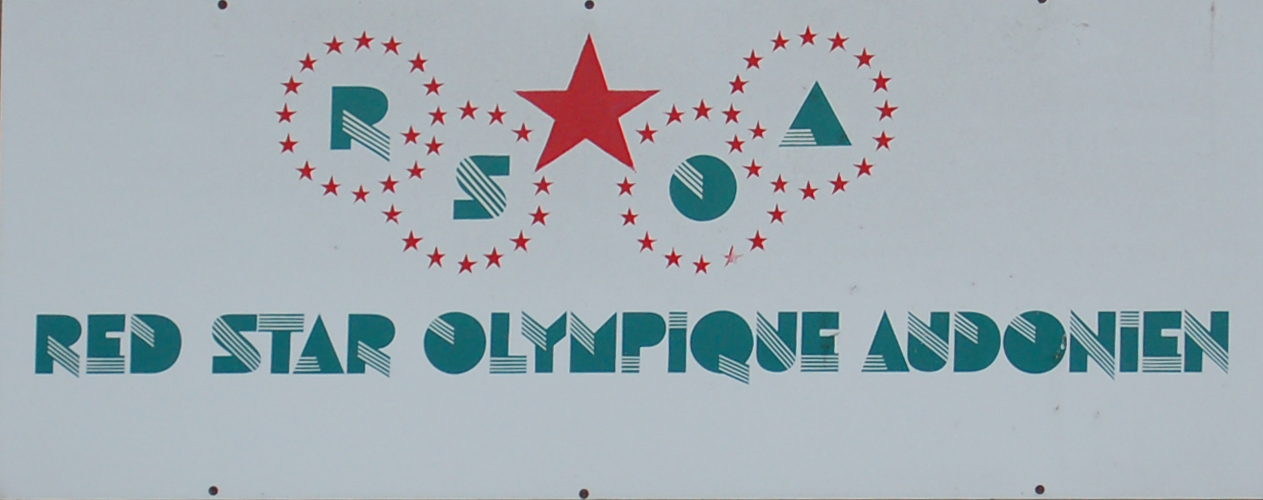
Red Star sign in front of Stade Bauer

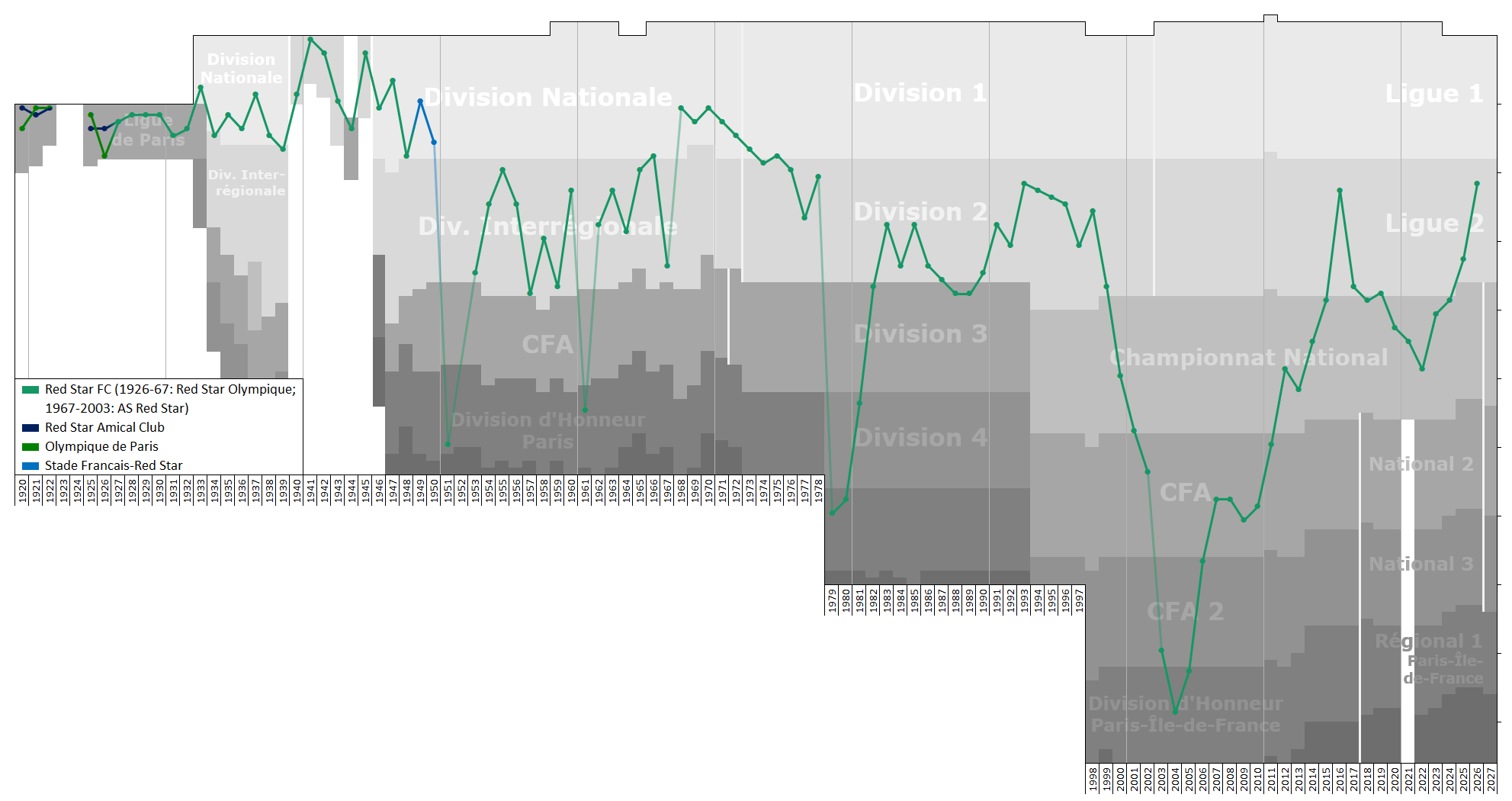
Historical league performance chart of Red Star FC

- Ligue 2
  - Champions (2): 1933–34, 1938–39
- Championnat National
  - Champions (3): 2014–15, 2017–18, 2023–24
- Championnat de France amateur 2
  - Champions (1): 2005–06 (Group A)
- Division d'Honneur (Paris Île-de-France)
  - Champions (4): 1919–20, 1921–22, 1923–24, 2004–05
- Coupe de France
  - Champions (5): 1920–21, 1921–22, 1922–23, 1927–28, 1941–42
  - Runners-up (1): 1945–46

=== Other ===
- Coupe Manier
  - Champions (1): 1908
- Ligue de Football Association (LFA) Championship
  - Champions (1): 1912
- Challenge de la Renommée
  - Champions (1): 1919
- Trophée de France
  - Runners-up (1): 1912

=== International ===
- Tournoi du Nouvel An
  - Winners (2): 1921 (shared), 1923, 1924 (shared)
- Tournoi de Pâques
  - Winners (1): 1923
  - Runners-up (2): 1922, 1929
- Tournoi Pascal
  - Winners (2): 1913, 1924
- Challenge International de Paris
  - Winners (1): 1913
- Tournoi de Pentecôte
  - Runners-up (1): 1927
