= 2024–25 Stade Malherbe Caen season =

Stade Malherbe Caen
2024–25 season
- Chairman: Ziad Hammoud
- Manager: Nicolas Seube (until 22 December 2024); Bruno Baltazar (until 17 February 2025); Michel Der Zakarian (since 22 February 2025)
- Stadium: Stade Michel d'Ornano
- Ligue 2: 18th
- Coupe de France: Round of 64
- Top goalscorer: League: Alexandre Mendy (8); All: Alexandre Mendy (11)
- Highest home attendance: Martigues (18,674) 18 Apr. 2025
- Lowest home attendance: Red Star (12,190) 2 May 2025
Home colours	Away colours	Third colours

The 2024–25 season was the 112th season in the history of the Stade Malherbe Caen, and the club's sixth consecutive season in Ligue 2. In addition to the domestic league, the team has participated in the Coupe de France. For the first time in forty-one years, Caen is relegated in Championnat National.

== Squad ==
=== First-team squad ===
As of 18 February 2025.

Note: Flags indicate national team as defined under FIFA eligibility rules; some limited exceptions apply. Players may hold more than one non-FIFA nationality.

No.	Pos.	Nation	Player
1	GK	ALG	Anthony Mandrea
3	DF	FRA	Diabé Bolumbu
4	DF	FRA	Valentin Henry
5	DF	GAB	Alex Moucketou-Moussounda
6	MF	FRA	Yann M'Vila
8	FW	FRA	Mickaël Le Bihan
10	MF	FRA	Bilal Brahimi
11	FW	GBS	Umaro Candé
14	MF	FRA	Lorenzo Rajot
16	GK	MTQ	Yannis Clementia
17	FW	FRA	Godson Kyeremeh
18	FW	MLI	Kalifa Coulibaly
19	FW	GBS	Alexandre Mendy
20	MF	FRA	Noé Lebreton
21	FW	FRA	Samuel Grandsir
22	FW	MAR	Mohamed Hafid
23	MF	FRA	Mathias Autret
24	MF	FRA	Yassine Benrahou

No.	Pos.	Nation	Player
25	DF	FRA	Lamine Sy
26	DF	FRA	Heliodino Tavares
27	DF	FRA	Jules Gaudin
28	DF	FRA	Quentin Lecoeuche
29	MF	FRA	Romain Thomas (c)
32	MF	FRA	Zoumana Bagbema
35	GK	COD	Parfait Mandanda
47	FW	FRA	Abdoulaye Niakaté
50	FW	FRA	Ilyes Najim
61	DF	FRA	Brahim Traoré
77	DF	CIV	Dieudonné Gaucho Debohi
88	FW	CIV	Adriel Ba Loua
91	DF	GHA	Emmanuel Ntim
—	MF	CIV	Daouda Koné

== Transfers ==
=== Out ===
Pos.	Player	Transferred to	Fee	Date	Source
DF	(Tunisia) Syam Ben Youssef		End of contract	1 July 2024	
MF	(France) Quentin Daubin	(Turkey) Gaziantep FK	End of contract	1 July 2024	
FW	(Benin) Andréas Hountondji	(England) Burnley	Undisclosed	17 July 2024	

== Friendlies ==
=== Pre-season ===
12 July 2024 Friendly	Caen (France)	0–1	(France) Nantes
18:00 UTC+2			Mahamoud 60'

20 July 2024 Friendly	Caen (France)	1–3	(France) Annecy	Port Valais, Switzerland
16:00	Niakaté 78'	Report	Djoco 6'; Casadei 81'; Billemaz 85'

24 July 2024 Friendly	Caen (France)	0–2	(France) Le Mans
18:00

27 July 2024 Friendly	Caen (France)	v	(France) Le Havre

27 July 2024 Friendly	Caen (France)	1–2	(France) Quevilly-Rouen
16:00

3 August 2024 Friendly	Caen (France)	1–6	(France) Guingamp
18:00

== Competitions ==
=== Overall record ===
Competition	First match	Last match	Starting round	Record							
Competition	First match	Last match	Starting round	Pld	W	D	L	GF	GA	GD	Win %
Ligue 2	17 August 2024	10 May 2025	Matchday 1	34	5	7	22	31	58	−27	14.71
Coupe de France	16 November 2024	22 December 2024	7th round	3	2	0	1	11	2	+9	66.67
Total				37	7	7	23	42	60	−18	18.92

Last updated: 12 May 2025
Source: Soccerway

=== Ligue 2 ===
==== League table ====
Pos	Team	Pld	W	D	L	GF	GA	GD	Pts	Promotion or Relegation
14	Rodez	34	9	12	13	56	54	+2	39	
15	Red Star	34	9	11	14	37	51	−14	38	
16	Clermont (O)	34	7	12	15	30	46	−16	33	Qualification for relegation play-offs
17	Martigues (Note: Martigues were originally going to be relegated to Régional 1 as the DNCG excluded them from national competitions. However, Martigues were then relegated further down to Départemental 1, the ninth tier of French football, before eventually getting relegated once again down to Départemental 3, the eleventh tier) (D, R)	34	9	5	20	29	56	−27	32	Administrative relegation to Départemental 3
18	Caen (R)	34	5	7	22	31	58	−27	22	Relegation to Championnat National

Source: Ligue 2
Rules for classification: 1) Points; 2) Goal difference; 3) Number of goals scored; 4) Head-to-head goal difference; 5) Fair play points
(D) Disqualified; (O) Play-off winners; (R) Relegated

==== Results summary ====
Overall								Home						Away					
Pld	W	D	L	GF	GA	GD	Pts	W	D	L	GF	GA	GD	W	D	L	GF	GA	GD
34	5	7	22	31	58	−27	22	3	5	9	15	24	−9	2	2	13	16	34	−18

Last updated: 12 May 2025.
Source: Ligue 2

==== Results by round ====
Round	1	2	3	4	5	6	7	8	9	10	11	12	13	14	15	16	17	18	19	20	21	22	23	24	25	26	27	28	29	30	31	32	33	34
Ground	H	A	H	A	H	H	A	H	A	H	A	H	A	H	A	A	H	H	A	H	A	H	A	H	A	H	A	A	H	A	H	A	H	A
Result	L	L	D	L	W	W	L	L	D	L	W	W	L	D	L	L	L	L	L	L	L	L	L	D	W	L	L	L	D	D	L	L	D	L
Position	15	17	16	16	15	13	13	14	15	15	14	13	14	14	16	16	16	16	17	17	18	18	18	18	18	18	18	18	18	18	18	18	18	18

Updated to match(es) played on 10 May 2025. Source: Ligue 2
A = Away; H = Home; W = Win; D = Draw; L = Loss

==== Matches ====
Win Draw Loss

17 August 2024 1	Caen	0–2	Paris FC	Caen
14:30 CEST (UTC+2)	Lebreton (yellow card) 28'; Meddah (yellow card) 64'; Gaucho Debohi (yellow card) 74'	Report	Gory 76' (yellow card) 83'; Kebbal 86' (pen.)	Stadium: Stade Michel d'Ornano; Attendance: 16,639; Referee: Pierre Gaillouste

23 August 2024 2	Pau	1–0	Caen	Pau
20:00 CEST (UTC+2)	Boutaïb 8' (red card) 56'; Ngom (red card) 32'; Gaspar (yellow card) 56'	Report	Kyeremeh (yellow card) 90+5'; Vandermersch (yellow card) 90+7'	Stadium: Nouste Camp; Attendance: 3,033; Referee: Mickaël Leleu

30 August 2024 3	Caen	1–1	Annecy	Caen
20:00 CEST (UTC+2)	Rajot (yellow card) 42' (goal) 62'	Report	Lajugie (yellow card) 35'; Tiendrebeogo (yellow card) 47' (goal) 52'	Stadium: Stade Michel d'Ornano; Attendance: 13,706; Referee: Antoine Valnet

16 September 2024 4	Grenoble	3–1	Caen	Grenoble
20:45 CEST (UTC+2)	Joseph (yellow card) 12'; Meïssa Ba 42' (pen.) 45'; Paquiez 59'	Report	Mendy 4'; Lecoeuche (yellow card) 41'; Meddah (yellow card) 52'; M'Vila (yellow card) 70'; Tavares Correia (yellow card) 80'	Stadium: Stade des Alpes; Attendance: 3,996; Referee: Olivier Thual

20 September 2024 5	Caen	1–0	Ajaccio	Caen
20:00 CEST (UTC+2)	Henry (yellow card) 77'; Brahimi 80'	Report	Ayessa (yellow card) 42'; Soumano (yellow card) 85'; Strata (yellow card) 90+6'	Stadium: Stade Michel d'Ornano; Attendance: 13,650; Referee: Geoffrey Kubler

24 September 2024 6	Caen	2–1	Amiens	Caen
20:30 CEST (UTC+2)	Mendy 13'; Bolumbu (yellow card) 45'; Lebreton (yellow card) 70'; Mendy 81'; Brahimi (yellow card) 90+7'	Report	Mafouta 26'; Gene (yellow card) 30'; Boya (yellow card) 73'	Stadium: Stade Michel d'Ornano; Attendance: 14,204; Referee: Thierry Bouille

30 September 2024 7	Guingamp	3–1	Caen	Guingamp
20:45 CEST (UTC+2)	Siwe 6' (yellow card) 45+4'; Hemia (yellow card) 28'; Picard 67'; Luvambo 78'	Report	Henry (yellow card) 33'; M'Vila (yellow card) 47'; Mendy 51'; Gaucho Debohi (yellow card) 54'	Stadium: Stade de Roudourou; Attendance: 7,558; Referee: Romain Lissorgue

5 October 2024 8	Caen	1–2	Lorient	Caen
14:00 CEST (UTC+2)	Gomis 17'; Gaucho Debohi (yellow card) 38'; Lecoeuche (yellow card) 49'	Report	Kroupi 35'; Bamba 87'	Stadium: Stade Michel d'Ornano; Attendance: 15,429; Referee: Florent Batta

18 October 2024 9	Red Star	2–2	Caen	Saint-Ouen-sur-Seine
20:00 CEST (UTC+2)	Durand (yellow card) 45+1' (goal) 81'; Hachem 65'; Benali (yellow card) 90+4'	Report	Lebreton 11'; Henry (yellow card) 43'; Gomis 63'	Stadium: Stade Bauer; Attendance: 4,643; Referee: Pierre Gaillouste

26 October 2024 10	Caen	0–1	Troyes	Caen
14:00 CEST (UTC+2)	Thomas (yellow card) 39'; Rajot (yellow card) 45+2'	Report	Adeline (yellow card) 10'; Saïd 45+4'; Gozzi (red card) 79'; Ripart (yellow card) 85'	Stadium: Stade Michel d'Ornano; Attendance: 15,771; Referee: Aurélien Petit

29 October 2024 11	Martigues	0–3	Caen	Gueugnon
20:30 CET (UTC+1)	Falette (yellow card) 68' (yellow-red card) 90+4'	Report	Bolumbu (yellow card) 50'; Mendy 69' (pen.), 90+1' (yellow card) 90+2'; Coulibaly (yellow card) 84'; Lebreton 90+5'	Stadium: Stade Jean Laville; Attendance: 580; Referee: Eddy Rosier

2 November 2024 12	Caen	2–0	Bastia	Caen
14:00 CET (UTC+1)	Mendy 31'; Brahimi 57'; Gaucho Debohi (yellow card) 69'	Report	Ariss (yellow card) 45'	Stadium: Stade Michel d'Ornano; Attendance: 15,441; Referee: Ahmed Taleb

9 November 2024 13	Metz	1–0	Caen	Metz
20:00 CET (UTC+1)	Hein 26'; Traoré (yellow card) 45+1'; Van Den Kerkhof (yellow card) 60'	Report		Stadium: Stade Saint-Symphorien; Attendance: 18,481; Referee: Antoine Valnet

22 November 2024 14	Caen	3–3	Rodez	Caen
20:00 CET (UTC+1)	Thomas 45+7'; Brahimi 51'; Meddah 90+6'	Report	Baldé 13'; Bouchouari 45+1'; Nkada 53'; Laurent (yellow card) 76'; Mambo (yellow card) 86'; Mpasi (yellow card) 90+6'	Stadium: Stade Michel d'Ornano; Attendance: 15,104; Referee: Thierry Bouille

6 December 2024 15	Laval	1–0	Caen	Laval
20:00 CET (UTC+1)	Sanna 12'; Roye (yellow card) 62'; Camara (yellow card) 70'	Report	Lecoeuche (yellow card) 59'	Stadium: Stade Francis Le Basser; Attendance: 7,154; Referee: Pierre Legat

16 December 2024 16	Dunkerque	3–1	Caen	Dunkirk
20:45 CET (UTC+1)	Raghouber (yellow card) 8'; Bammou 53'; Sasso 65'; Courtet 83' (pen.)	Report	Gaucho Debohi (yellow card) 52'; Lebreton (yellow card) 69'; Tomé 73'; Milliner (yellow card) 75'; Lecoeuche (yellow card) 82'	Stadium: Stade Marcel-Tribut; Attendance: 4,165; Referee: Florent Batta

3 January 2025 17	Caen	0–1	Clermont Foot	Caen
20:00 CET (UTC+1)	Rajot (yellow card) 35'; Gaucho Debohi (yellow card) 52'	Report	Douane (yellow card) 39'; Keïta (yellow card) 84'; Diaby 89'	Stadium: Stade Michel d'Ornano; Attendance: 15,248; Referee: Eddy Rosier

11 January 2025 18	Caen	0–1	Grenoble	Caen
14:00 CET (UTC+1)	Brahimi (yellow card) 7'; Mendy (yellow card) 45+3'; Henry (red card) 60'; Coulibaly (yellow card) 90+11' (yellow-red card) 90+11'	Report	Valls 45+1'; Xantippe (yellow card) 74'; Diarra (yellow card) 85'; Mendy (red card) 88'; Sylvestre (yellow card) 90+10'	Stadium: Stade Michel d'Ornano; Attendance: 13,095; Referee: Guillaume Paradis

17 January 2025 19	Ajaccio	2–1	Caen	Ajaccio
20:00 CET (UTC+1)	Anziani (yellow card) 40'; Bamba (yellow card) 42' (goal) 70'; Kanté 83'; Santelli (yellow card) 90+3'	Report	Rajot (yellow card) 16'; Traoré (yellow card) 42'; Mendy 62'	Stadium: Stade Michel-Moretti; Attendance: 4,495; Referee: Pierre Gaillouste

24 January 2025 20	Caen	0–1	Guingamp	Caen
20:00 CET (UTC+1)	Clementia (yellow card) 30'; Lecoeuche (yellow card) 75'	Report	Labeau 44'; Guendouz (yellow card) 45+4'; Touzghar (yellow card) 83'	Stadium: Stade Michel d'Ornano; Attendance: 14,740; Referee: Thierry Bouille

1 February 2025 21	Troyes	3–0	Caen	Troyes
14:00 CET (UTC+1)	de Préville (yellow card) 28'; M'Changama 48'; Saïd 51'; Diop 70'	Report	Le Bihan (yellow card) 18'; Gaucho Debohi (yellow card) 85'	Stadium: Stade de l'Aube; Attendance: 9,645; Referee: Aurélien Petit

10 February 2025 22	Caen	0–2	Dunkerque	Caen
20:45 CET (UTC+1)	Lebreton (yellow card) 30'; Brahimi (red card) 37'; Clementia (yellow card) 38'; Gaudin (yellow card) 54'; M'Vila (yellow card) 87'; Mendy (yellow card) 87'	Report	Sasso (yellow card) 25'; Courtet 45'; Skyttä 56'; Raghouber (yellow card) 87'; Bammou (yellow card) 87'; Tejan (yellow card) 90+2'	Stadium: Stade Michel d'Ornano; Attendance: 15,540; Referee: Pierre Legat

17 February 2025 23	Annecy	1–0	Caen	Annecy
20:45 CET (UTC+1)	Demoncy 13'; Nsakala (yellow card) 38'; Paris (yellow card) 90'	Report		Stadium: Parc des Sports; Attendance: 4,768; Referee: Olivier Thual

22 February 2025 24	Caen	2–2	Pau	Caen
14:00 CET (UTC+1)	Traoré (yellow card) 6'; M'Vila 10' (yellow card) 90+7'; Gaucho Debohi (yellow card) 30'; Mendy (yellow card) 35'; Thomas 59' (red card) 63'; Gaudin (yellow card) 86'	Report	Mille 7' (pen.) (yellow card) 54'; Kouassi (yellow card) 33' (yellow-red card) 58'; Kamara (yellow card) 34'; Mboup 71' (pen.)	Stadium: Stade Michel d'Ornano; Attendance: 15,231; Referee: Robin Chapapria

28 February 2025 25	Clermont Foot	0–1	Caen	Clermont-Ferrand
20:00 CET (UTC+1)	Douane (yellow card) 70'	Report	Gaucho Debohi (yellow card) 56'; Henry (yellow card) 70'; Coulibaly 86'	Stadium: Stade Gabriel-Montpied; Attendance: 4,478; Referee: Geoffrey Kubler

7 March 2025 26	Caen	0–1	Laval	Caen
20:00 CET (UTC+1)	Gaudin (yellow card) 48'; Lecoeuche (yellow card) 73'; Gaucho Debohi (yellow card) 82'	Report	Kokolo 6'; Tchokounté (yellow card) 35'; Tavares (yellow card) 39'	Stadium: Stade Michel d'Ornano; Attendance: 17,746; Referee: Aurélien Petit

14 March 2025 27	Amiens	2–1	Caen	Amiens
20:00 CET (UTC+1)	Monconduit (yellow card) 19'; Jaouab (yellow card) 53'; Leautey 58'; Kandil 73'; Vita (yellow card) 90+6'	Report	M'Vila (yellow card) 82'; Coulibaly 90+2'	Stadium: Stade de la Licorne; Attendance: 12,035; Referee: Mickaël Leleu

31 March 2025 28	Paris FC	4–2	Caen	Paris
20:45 CEST (UTC+2)	Kolodziejczak 13'; Krasso 32', 60' (yellow card) 74'; Cafaro 44'	Report	Henry (yellow card) 27'; Moucketou-Mounssounda (yellow card) 45+3'; Lebreton (yellow card) 54'; Kyeremeh 82'; Tourraine 90+1' (o.g.)	Stadium: Stade Sébastien Charléty; Attendance: 9,227; Referee: Eddy Rosier

5 April 2025 29	Caen	2–2	Metz	Caen
14:00 CEST (UTC+2)	Grandsir 47'; Lebreton (yellow card) 27' (goal) 68'; Traoré (yellow card) 50'; M'Vila (yellow card) 74'	Report	Van Den Kerkhof 42'; Sabaly 61'; Sané (yellow card) 78'	Stadium: Stade Michel d'Ornano; Attendance: 16,555; Referee: Rémi Landry

11 April 2025 30	Rodez	2–2	Caen	Rodez
20:00 CEST (UTC+2)	Nkada 47'; Baldé 90+1'	Report	Lebreton 60'; Kyeremeh 82'	Stadium: Stade Paul-Lignon; Attendance: 4,760; Referee: Pierre Legat

18 April 2025 31	Caen	0–3	Martigues	Caen
20:00 CEST (UTC+2)	Gaucho Debohi (yellow card) 58'	Report	Solvet 5'; Mendy 17' (yellow card) 53'; Djaha (yellow card) 34'; Robin 50'	Stadium: Stade Michel d'Ornano; Attendance: 18,674; Referee: Olivier Thual

26 April 2025 32	Lorient	4–0	Caen	Lorient
20:00 CEST (UTC+2)	Laporte (yellow card) 13'; Bamba 16'; Kroupi 23'; Soumano 78', 90+3'	Report	M'Vila (yellow card) 43'	Stadium: Stade du Moustoir; Attendance: 14,535; Referee: Guillaume Paradis

2 May 2025 33	Caen	1–1	Red Star	Caen
20:00 CEST (UTC+2)	Najim 72'	Report	Badji 31'; Durivaux (yellow card) 84'; Escartin (yellow card) 90+4'	Stadium: Stade Michel d'Ornano; Attendance: 12,190; Referee: Karim Abed

10 May 2025 34	Bastia	2–1	Caen	Bastia
17:00 CEST (UTC+2)	Guidi 24'; Ariss 72'	Report	Lebreton (yellow card) 3'; Najim 28'; Le Bihan (yellow card) 47'	Stadium: Stade Armand-Cesari; Attendance: 9,757; Referee: Mickaël Leleu

=== Coupe de France ===
16 November 2024 Seventh round	C'Chartres Football	0–4	Caen	Chartres
CET (UTC+1)		Report	Brahimi 3' 39'; Le Bihan 7'; Mendy 23'	Stadium: Stade Jacques-Couvret

30 November 2024 Eight round	Caen	6–0	Bolbec	Caen
13:30 CET (UTC+1)	Le Bihan 8'; Autret 48'; Kyeremeh 58' 87'; Mendy 66'; Brahimi 71'	Report		Stadium: Stade Michel d'Ornano

22 December 2024 Round of 64	Guingamp	2–1	Caen	Guingamp
17:30 CET (UTC+1)	Hemia (yellow card) 60'; Luvambo 79'; Picard 90+2'; Demouchy (yellow card) 90+6'	Report	Autret (yellow card) 23'; Ntim (yellow card) 28'; Mendy 86'	Stadium: Stade de Roudourou; Referee: Jérôme Brisard
