= 2023–24 Stade Malherbe Caen season =

Stade Malherbe Caen
2023–24 season
- Chairman: Olivier Pickeu
- Manager: Jean-Marc Furlan (until 4 November 2023); Patrice Sauvaget (interim); Nicolas Seube (from 30 November)
- Stadium: Stade Michel d'Ornano
- Ligue 2: 6th
- Coupe de France: Round of 64
- Top goalscorer: League: Alexandre Mendy (22); All: Alexandre Mendy (23)
- Highest home attendance: Valenciennes (19,466), 17 May 2024
- Lowest home attendance: Troyes (13,198), 27 Jan. 2024
- Average home league attendance: 15,479
Home colours	Away colours

The 2023–24 season was Stade Malherbe Caen's 111th season in existence and fifth consecutive in the Ligue 2. They also competed in the Coupe de France.

== Players ==
=== First-team squad ===
As of 20 March 2024.

Note: Flags indicate national team as defined under FIFA eligibility rules; some limited exceptions apply. Players may hold more than one non-FIFA nationality.

No.	Pos.	Nation	Player
1	GK	ALG	Anthony Mandrea
2	DF	TUN	Ali Abdi
3	DF	FRA	Diabé Bolumbu
4	DF	FRA	Valentin Henry
5	DF	TUN	Syam Ben Youssef
6	MF	FRA	Quentin Daubin
7	FW	FRA	Tidiam Gomis
11	FW	FRA	Mickaël Le Bihan
15	FW	FRA	Amine Salama
16	GK	MTQ	Yannis Clementia
17	FW	FRA	Godson Kyeremeh
18	MF	FRA	Hiang'a Mbock
19	FW	GBS	Alexandre Mendy
20	MF	FRA	Noé Lebreton

No.	Pos.	Nation	Player
21	MF	FRA	Bilal Brahimi
22	FW	FRA	Mohamed Hafid
23	MF	FRA	Mathias Autret
27	DF	FRA	Daylam Meddah
29	DF	FRA	Romain Thomas (c)
30	GK	FRA	Destiné Jopanguy
35	GK	FRA	Parfait Mandanda
61	DF	FRA	Brahim Traoré
80	MF	FRA	Mario Fortunato
92	DF	FRA	Alexandre Coeff
97	DF	CIV	Dieudonné Gaucho Debohi
—	DF	RUS	Vladislav Molchan
—	MF	CIV	Daouda Koné

=== Out on loan ===
Note: Flags indicate national team as defined under FIFA eligibility rules; some limited exceptions apply. Players may hold more than one non-FIFA nationality.

No.	Pos.	Nation	Player
—	MF	FRA	Lamine Sy (on loan to Rouen)
—	FW	COD	Samuel Essende (on loan to Vizela)
—	FW	BEN	Andréas Hountondji (on loan to Rodez)

No.	Pos.	Nation	Player
—	FW	FRA	Ilyes Najim (on loan to Martigues)
—	FW	MLI	Moussa Sylla (on loan to Pau)

== Transfers ==
=== In ===
Pos.	Player	Transferred from	Fee	Date	Source
DF	(France) Valentin Henry	(France) Sochaux	Free	1 July 2023	
DF	(France) Syam Ben Youssef	(France) Quevilly-Rouen	Free	1 July 2023	
MF	(France) Mathias Autret	(France) Auxerre	Free	21 July 2023	

=== Out ===
Pos.	Player	Transferred to	Fee	Date	Source
MF	(Sweden) Anton Salétros	(Sweden) AIK	€800,000	8 July 2023	

== Pre-season and friendlies ==
29 July 2023 Friendly	Caen (France)	2–2	(France) Quevilly-Rouen	Caen
18:00 UTC+2	Daubin 22'; Mendy 62' (pen.)		Pierret (yellow card) 16'; Baboula 33'; Yadé 84'	Stadium: Terrain Annexe 3 du Venoix; Referee: Benjamin Lepaysan

== Competitions ==
=== Overall record ===
Competition	First match	Last match	Starting round	Record							
Competition	First match	Last match	Starting round	Pld	W	D	L	GF	GA	GD	Win %
Ligue 2	5 August 2023	17 May 2024	Matchday 1	38	17	7	14	51	45	+6	44.74
Coupe de France	TBD		Seventh round	0	0	0	0	0	0	+0	—
Total				38	17	7	14	51	45	+6	44.74

Last updated: 23 May 2024
Source: Soccerway

=== Ligue 2 ===
==== League table ====
Pos	Team	Pld	W	D	L	GF	GA	GD	Pts	Promotion or Relegation
4	Rodez	38	16	12	10	62	51	+11	60	Qualification for promotion play-offs semi-final
5	Paris FC	38	16	11	11	49	42	+7	59	Qualification for promotion play-offs semi-final
6	Caen	38	17	7	14	51	45	+6	58	
7	Laval	38	15	10	13	40	45	−5	55	
8	Amiens	38	12	17	9	36	36	0	53	

Updated to match(es) played on 17 May 2024. Source: Ligue 2
Rules for classification: 1) Points; 2) Goal difference; 3) Number of goals scored; 4) Head-to-head goal difference; 5) Fair play points

==== Results summary ====
Overall								Home						Away					
Pld	W	D	L	GF	GA	GD	Pts	W	D	L	GF	GA	GD	W	D	L	GF	GA	GD
38	17	7	14	51	45	+6	58	11	3	5	26	12	+14	6	4	9	25	33	−8

Last updated: 23 May 2024.
Source: Ligue 2 BKT

==== Results by round ====
Round	1	2	3	4	5	6	7	8	9	10	11	12	13	14	15	16	17	18	19	20	21	22	23	24	25	26	27	28	29	30	31	32	33	34	35	36	37	38
Ground	A	H	A	H	A	H	A	H	H	A	H	A	A	H	A	H	A	H	A	H	A	H	A	H	A	H	A	H	A	A	H	H	A	H	A	H	A	H
Result	W	W	W	W	L	L	D	L	L	L	D	D	L	D	L	W	W	W	D	W	W	D	L	W	L	W	W	L	L	W	L	W	L	W	L	W	D	W
Position	4	1	1	1	1	2	4	7	10	11	11	11	12	13	16	12	12	9	11	10	5	6	7	5	7	6	5	5	8	6	7	6	8	7	8	6	6	6

Updated to match(es) played on 23 May 2024. Source: Ligue 2 BKT
A = Away; H = Home; W = Win; D = Draw; L = Loss

==== Matches ====
The league fixtures were unveiled on 29 June 2023.

5 August 2023 1	Paris FC	0–2	Caen	Troyes
19:00 UTC+2	Gaudin (yellow card) 2' (yellow-red card) 33'	Report	Daubin (yellow card) 29'; Mendy 45+3'; Vandermersch (yellow card) 52'; Abdi 62'	Stadium: Stade de l'Aube; Attendance: 1,056; Referee: Nicolas Rainville

12 August 2023 2	Caen	2–0	Pau	Caen
19:00 UTC+2	Daubin 37'; Mendy 45+2' (pen.)	Report	Kanté (yellow card) 35' (yellow-red card) 57'	Stadium: Stade Michel d'Ornano; Attendance: 15,168; Referee: Ahmed Taleb

19 August 2023 3	Concarneau	0–2	Caen	Brest
19:00 UTC+2	Mouazan (yellow card) 60'	Report	Mendy 54' (pen.); Brahimi (yellow card) 65'; Abdi 90+2'	Stadium: Stade Francis-Le Blé; Attendance: 3,001; Referee: Thierry Bouille

26 August 2023 4	Caen	3–0	Ajaccio	Caen
19:00 UTC+2	Mendy 37', 45', 63'; Kyeremeh (yellow card) 87'	Report	Bayala (yellow card) 53'; Bammou (yellow card) 65'	Stadium: Stade Michel d'Ornano; Attendance: 16,190; Referee: Aurélien Petit

2 September 2023 5	Laval	2–1	Caen	Laval
19:00 UTC+2	Kadile (yellow card) 56'; Vargas (yellow card) 79'; Martins (yellow card) 88'; Vargas 90+2'; Tchokounté 90+5' (pen.)	Report	Daubin (yellow card) 44'; Mandrea (yellow card) 61'; Abdi 78'; Henry (yellow card) 90+4'	Stadium: Stade Francis Le Basser; Attendance: 8,889; Referee: Rémi Landry

16 September 2023 6	Caen	1–2	Saint-Étienne	Caen
15:00 UTC+2	Henry (yellow card) 35'; Abdi (yellow card) 67'; Mandrea (yellow card) 77'; Mendy 90+4'	Report	Tardieu 30' (pen.); Fomba (yellow card) 77'; Sissoko 88'	Stadium: Stade Michel d'Ornano; Attendance: 19,013; Referee: Abdelatif Kherradji

3 October 2023 7	Bordeaux	1–1	Caen	Bordeaux
18:45 UTC+2	Davitashvili 34'; Michelin (yellow card) 40'; Badji (yellow card) 49'; Ihnatenko (yellow card) 89'	Report	Mendy 15'; Henry (yellow card) 55'	Stadium: Matmut Atlantique; Attendance: 21,038; Referee: Hakim Bel Hadj

26 September 2023 8	Caen	1–2	Grenoble	Caen
20:45 UTC+2	Abdi 19'	Report	Mendy (yellow card) 24'; Ba 46', 49'; Touray (yellow card) 56'; Postolachi (yellow card) 73'	Stadium: Stade Michel d'Ornano; Attendance: 14,770; Referee: Nicolas Rainville

30 September 2023 9	Caen	0–1	Guingamp	Caen
19:00 UTC+2	Thomas (yellow card) 90+4'	Report	Sagna 77'; Gomis (yellow card) 79'; Sidibé (yellow card) 89'	Stadium: Stade Michel d'Ornano; Attendance: 14,881; Referee: Guillaume Paradis

7 October 2023 10	Rodez	5–3	Caen	Rodez
19:00 UTC+2	Rajot 4'; Arconte 13', 72', 76'; Abdallah (yellow card) 23'; Haag (yellow card) 43'; Arconte (yellow card) 84'; Younoussa 90+2'	Report	Thomas 42'; Mendy 45+1'; Le Bihan 45+3'; Court (yellow card) 62'; Henry (yellow card) 75'; Ntim (yellow card) 90+5'	Stadium: Stade Paul-Lignon; Attendance: 2,892; Referee: Romain Delpech

21 October 2023 11	Caen	1–1	Auxerre	Caen
15:00 UTC+2	Ntim (yellow card) 42'; Abdi 52'	Report	Abdi 6' (o.g.); Jubal (yellow card) 39'	Stadium: Stade Michel d'Ornano; Attendance: 17,917; Referee: Jérémie Pignard

28 October 2023 12	Valenciennes	2–2	Caen	Valenciennes
19:00 UTC+2	Lilepo 8'; Hamache 29'	Report	Daubin (yellow card) 53'; Ntim (yellow card) 61'; Le Bihan 87'; Abdi 90+1'	Stadium: Stade du Hainaut; Attendance: 6,682; Referee: Karim Abed

4 November 2023 13	Troyes	2–1	Caen	Troyes
19:00 UTC+1	Ilić 17'; Ndiaye (yellow card) 38'; Saïd (yellow card) 41'; Dong (yellow card) 50'; Assoumou 64'; Mazou-Sacko (yellow card) 90+2'	Report	Abdi (yellow card) 21'; Mendy 61'	Stadium: Stade de l'Aube; Attendance: 4,401; Referee: Rémi Landry

11 November 2023 14	Caen	3–3	Quevilly-Rouen	Caen
19:00 UTC+1	Kyeremeh 12'; Ben Youssef (yellow card) 31'; Mendy 43'; Le Bihan 90+7'	Report	Delaurier-Chaubet 20'; Gbelle 22'; Pierret (yellow card) 45'; Cissé (yellow card) 45+2'; Coulibaly 58'; Yade (red card) 90+7'	Stadium: Stade Michel d'Ornano; Attendance: 14,485; Referee: Aurélien Petit

27 November 2023 15	Angers	3–0	Caen	Angers
20:45 UTC+1	Diony 29'; Hountondji (yellow card) 72'; Capelle 87'; Bahoya 90+4'	Report	Abdi (yellow card) 8'; Mbock (yellow card) 47'; Ben Youssef (yellow card) 74' (red card) 75'; Henry (yellow card) 79'	Stadium: Stade Raymond Kopa; Attendance: 9,202; Referee: Ahmed Taleb

2 December 2023 16	Caen	1–0	Bastia	Caen
19:00 UTC+1	Gaucho Debohi (yellow card) 78'; Mendy 88'; Brahimi (yellow card) 90'	Report	Keita (yellow card) 33'; Janneh (yellow card) 67'; Djoco (yellow card) 74'; Tavares (yellow card) 90+3'	Stadium: Stade Michel d'Ornano; Attendance: 14,469; Referee: Thierry Bouille

6 December 2023 17	Annecy	1–2	Caen	Annecy
19:00 UTC+1	Shamal (yellow card) 12'; Ntamack 20'; Soukouna (yellow card) 90'	Report	Lebreton (yellow card) 50'; Mendy 77'; Autret 80'	Stadium: Parc des Sports; Attendance: 3,513; Referee: Faouzi Benchabane

16 December 2023 18	Caen	1–0	Dunkerque	Caen
19:00 UTC+1	Brahimi 8'; Gaucho Debohi (yellow card) 57'; Henry (yellow card) 81'	Report	Sy (yellow card) 63'; Anziani (yellow card) 81'	Stadium: Stade Michel d'Ornano; Attendance: 13,723; Referee: Mickaël Leleu

19 December 2023 19	Amiens	0–0	Caen	Amiens
20:45 UTC+1	Gelin (yellow card) 53'; Mafouta (yellow card) 82'	Report	Brahimi (yellow card) 36'	Stadium: Stade de la Licorne; Attendance: 5,927; Referee: Romain Delpech

13 January 2024 20	Caen	1–0	Concarneau	Caen
19:00 UTC+1	Kyeremeh (yellow card) 49'; Mendy 72'	Report	Georgen (yellow card) 18'; Jannez (yellow card) 34'	Stadium: Stade Michel d'Ornano; Attendance: 13,487; Referee: Azzédine Souifi

23 January 2024 21	Bastia	1–2	Caen	Bastia
20:45 UTC+1	Santelli 33' (pen.); Charbonnier (yellow card) 81' (yellow-red card) 84'	Report	Mbock (yellow card) 23'; Thomas (yellow card) 56'; Mbock 60'; Gaucho Debohi (yellow card) 62'; Mendy 83' (pen.); Le Bihan (yellow card) 90+1'	Stadium: Stade Furiani; Attendance: 9,598; Referee: Rémi Landry

27 January 2024 22	Caen	0–0	Troyes	Caen
19:00 UTC+1	Lebreton (yellow card) 52'; Traoré (yellow card) 69'	Report	Chavalerin (yellow card) 50'	Stadium: Stade Michel d'Ornano; Attendance: 13,198; Referee: Olivier Thual

3 February 2024 23	Grenoble	5–1	Caen	Grenoble
19:00 UTC+1	Nestor 36'; Ba 45+1' (pen.) 55'; Rigo (yellow card) 59'; Sbaï 66' (pen.); Touray 90+5'	Report	Coeff (red card) 85'; Mendy 89'; Meddah (yellow card) 90+1'	Stadium: Stade des Alpes; Attendance: 4,876; Referee: Guillaume Paradis

10 February 2024 24	Caen	2–0	Amiens	Caen
19:00 UTC+1	Abdi (yellow card) 59' (goal) 81'; Autret (yellow card) 63'; Mendy 84'	Report	Kaïboué (yellow card) 53'; Boya (yellow card) 78'	Stadium: Stade Michel d'Ornano; Attendance: 13,454; Referee: Antoine Valnet

17 February 2024 25	Guingamp	1–0	Caen	Guingamp
19:00 UTC+1	Gomis 4'; Sivis (yellow card) 63'; Lobry (yellow card) 89'	Report	Abdi (yellow card) 48'; Daubin (yellow card) 68'; Lebreton (yellow card) 89'	Stadium: Stade de Roudourou; Attendance: 9,371; Referee: Karim Abed

26 February 2024 26	Caen	2–0	Angers	Caen
20:45 UTC+1	Abdi 13', 58'; Mandrea (yellow card) 83'	Report	Abdelli (yellow card) 79'	Stadium: Stade Michel d'Ornano; Attendance: 16,965; Referee: Aurélien Petit

2 March 2024 27	Pau	2–3	Caen	Pau
19:00 UTC+1	Ahoussou (yellow card) 65'; Boli 76'; Ngom 90+1'; Gaspar (yellow card) 90+7'	Report	Mendy 31'; Daubin (yellow card) 61'; Kyeremeh 69'; Salama 85'	Stadium: Nouste Camp; Attendance: 3,068; Referee: Thierry Bouille

8 March 2024 28	Caen	0–1	Paris FC	Caen
19:00 UTC+1		Report	Hamel (yellow card) 67'; Ollila 85'; Marchetti (yellow card) 89'	Stadium: Stade Michel d'Ornano; Attendance: 17,015; Referee: Pierre Legat

16 March 2024 29	Auxerre	2–1	Caen	Auxerre
15:00 UTC+1	Raveloson 76'; Hein (yellow card) 77'; Jubal 82'	Report	Kyeremeh 10'; Lebreton (yellow card) 38'	Stadium: Stade de l'Abbé-Deschamps; Attendance: 14,964; Referee: Rémi Landry

30 March 2024 30	Quevilly-Rouen	1–2	Caen	Rouen
19:00 UTC+1	Delaurier-Chaubet (yellow card) 16'; Pierret 66' (yellow card) 89'	Report	Mendy 10', 43'; Daubin (yellow card) 15'; Meddah (yellow card) 75'; Mbock (yellow card) 90+3'	Stadium: Stade Robert Diochon; Attendance: 4,476; Referee: Guillaume Paradis

6 April 2024 31	Caen	0–1	Bordeaux	Caen
19:00 UTC+2	Lebreton (yellow card) 35'; Meddah (yellow card) 65'; Mandrea (yellow card) 90+7'	Report	Diaz 20'; Pitu (yellow card) 50'; Sissokho (yellow card) 90+5'	Stadium: Stade Michel d'Ornano; Attendance: 19,168; Referee: Azzédine Souifi

13 April 2024 32	Caen	1–0	Rodez	Caen
19:00 UTC+2	Traoré (yellow card) 34'; Raux-Yao 45' (o.g.); Henry (yellow card) 83'	Report		Stadium: Stade Michel d'Ornano; Attendance: 17,250; Referee: Olivier Thual

20 April 2024 33	AC Ajaccio	2–1	Caen	Ajaccio
19:00 UTC+2	Barreto (yellow card) 20' (goal) 20'; Ibayi 45'; Sollacaro (yellow card) 90+4'	Report	Mendy 90+5'	Stadium: Stade Michel Moretti; Attendance: 5,265; Referee: Rémi Landry

23 April 2024 34	Caen	2–1	Annecy	Caen
20:45 UTC+2	Gaucho Debohi (yellow card) 14'; Abdi 19'; Thomas 78'	Report	Demoncy (yellow card) 27'; Pajot (red card) 27'; Larose 72'	Stadium: Stade Michel d'Ornano; Attendance: 17,137; Referee: Ahmed Taleb

27 April 2024 35	Saint-Étienne	1–0	Caen	Saint-Étienne
15:00 UTC+2	Moueffek 5'	Report	Abdi (yellow card) 44'; Brahimi (yellow card) 70'; Henry (yellow card) 76'; Traoré (red card) 90+3'	Stadium: Stade Geoffroy-Guichard; Attendance: 35,445; Referee: Nicolas Rainville

3 May 2024 36	Caen	1–0	Laval	Caen
20:00 UTC+2	Thomas (yellow card) 59'; Brahimi 86'	Report	Baldé (yellow card) 70'	Stadium: Stade Michel d'Ornano; Attendance: 18,348; Referee: Gaël Angoula

10 May 2024 37	Dunkerque	2–2	Caen	Dunkirk
20:00 UTC+2	Sanganté 50'; Youssouf (yellow card) 55'; Gbamin 77'; Courtet (yellow card) 90+2'		Mendy 2'; Bolumbu (yellow card) 23'; Gaucho Debohi 69'	Stadium: Stade Marcel-Tribut; Attendance: 4,933; Referee: Jérémie Pignard

17 May 2024 38	Caen	3–0	Valenciennes	Caen
	Gomis 23', 63'; Mendy 85' (pen.)		Venema (yellow card) 0'; Basse (yellow card) 51'	Stadium: Stade Michel d'Ornano; Attendance: 19,466; Referee: Olivier Thual
