= Nieroba =

Nieroba is a Polish surname. Notable people with the surname include:

- Antoni Nieroba (born 1939), Polish footballer and manager
- Norbert Nieroba (born 1964), German boxer
