= Anthony Mandrea =

Footballer (born 1996)

Anthony Mandrea أنتوني ماندريا
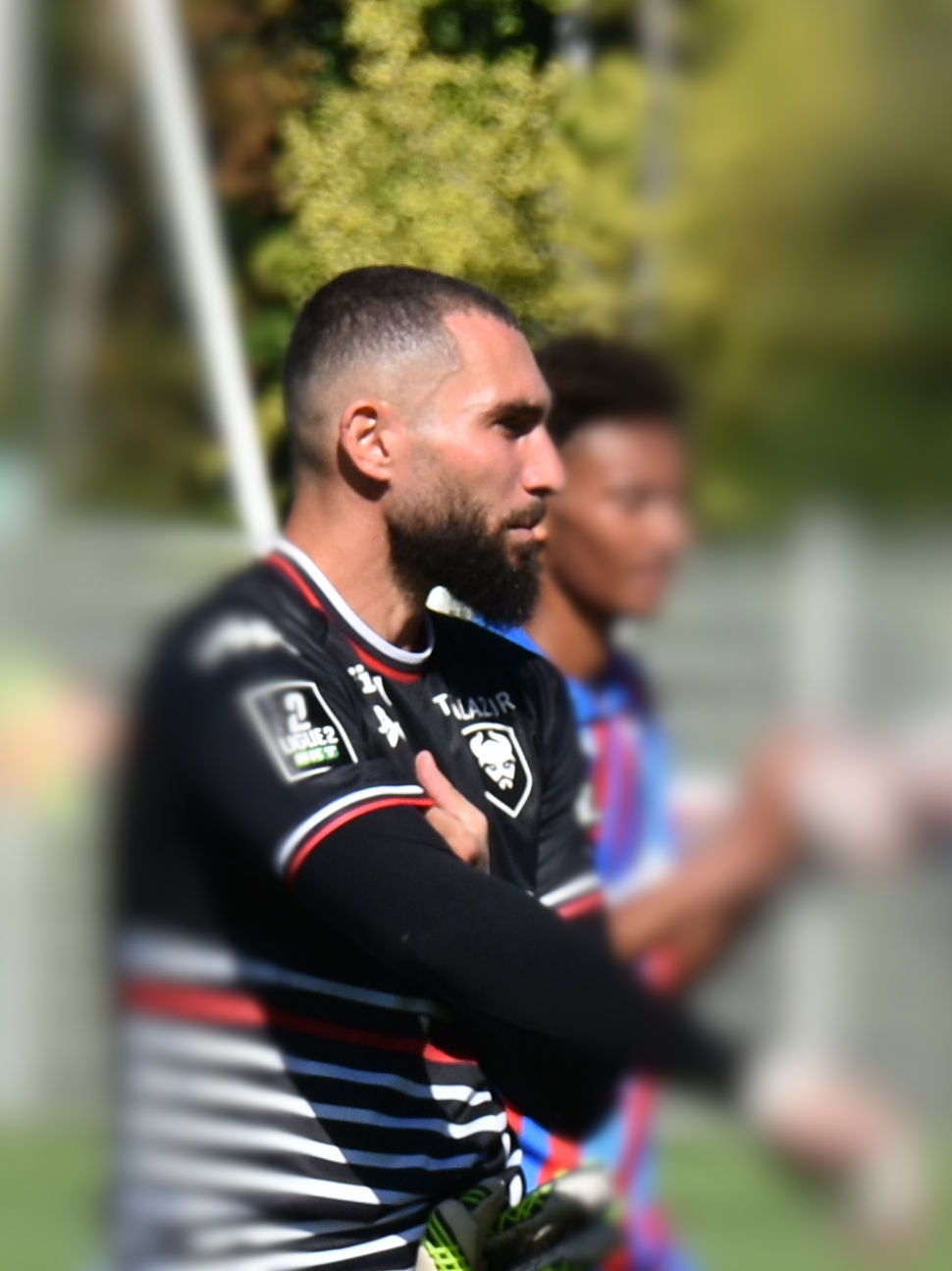
- portrait in 2024, with SM Caen

Personal information
- Full name: Anthony Louis Mandrea
- Date of birth: 25 December 1996 (age 29)
- Place of birth: Grasse, France
- Height: 1.86 m (6 ft 1 in)
- Position: Goalkeeper

Team information
- Current team: Caen
- Number: 1

Youth career
- 2002–2009: U.S. Pegomas
- 2009–2013: Nice

Senior career*
Years	Team	Apps	(Gls)
2013–2016	Nice II	11	(0)
2013–2016	Nice	1	(0)
2016–2020	Angers II	59	(0)
2016–2022	Angers	10	(0)
2020–2021	→ Cholet (loan)	32	(0)
2022–	Caen	123	(0)

International career^{‡}
2013	France U18	2	(0)
2022–	Algeria	22	(0)
- * Club domestic league appearances and goals as of 23 June 2026 ‡ National team caps and goals as of 31 December 2025

Anthony Louis Mandrea (Arabic: أنتوني لويس ماندريا; born 25 December 1996) is a professional footballer who plays as a goalkeeper for Ligue 3 club Caen. Born in France, he represents the Algeria national team.

== Club career ==
Mandrea made his Ligue 1 debut for Nice on 3 November 2013 in a 1–2 home defeat against Bordeaux, replacing an injured David Ospina after 51 minutes. At 16 years and 10 months he was, at the time, the youngest goalkeeper to play in Ligue 1. He made no further first team appearances for Nice, and in the summer of 2016 he moved to Angers, where he signed professional terms on a three-year deal in September 2017. His Angers debut came in the Coupe de la Ligue on 12 December 2017 against Metz, in which he kept a clean sheet.

In July 2020, as third-choice goalkeeper for Angers, he was loaned to SO Cholet in the Championnat National in search of playing time. At the end of the season he was named best goalkeeper of the Championnat National season.

On 23 June 2022, Mandrea moved to Caen on a two-year deal. He became first choice goalkeeper at Caen, making 37 Ligue 2 in his debut 2022–23 season.

== Personal life ==
Mandrea was born in France to a French father and Algerian mother. He made one appearance for the France U18s at the Tournoi de Limoges in 2013.

He was called up to the senior Algeria national team in May 2022, and made his debut in a 2–1 friendly win over Iran on 12 June 2022.

In December 2023, he was named in Algeria's squad for the 2023 Africa Cup of Nations.

In December 2025, he was named in Algeria's squad for the 2025 Africa Cup of Nations.

== Career statistics ==
=== Club ===
As of 12 May 2025

Appearances and goals by club, season and competition
Club	Season	League			National cup		League cup		Other		Total	
Club	Season	Division	Apps	Goals	Apps	Goals	Apps	Goals	Apps	Goals	Apps	Goals
Nice II	2013–14	CFA	1	0	—		—		—		1	0
Nice II	2014–15	CFA	0	0	—		—		—		0	0
Nice II	2015–16	CFA	10	0	—		—		—		10	0
Nice II	Total		11	0	—		—		—		11	0
Nice	2013–14	Ligue 1	1	0	—		—		—		1	0
Angers	2016–17	CFA 2	6	0	—		—		—		6	0
Angers	2017–18	National 3	19	0	—		—		—		19	0
Angers	2018–19	National 3	19	0	—		—		—		19	0
Angers	2019–20	National 2	15	0	—		—		—		15	0
Angers	2021–22	National 2	3	0	—		—		—		3	0
Angers	Total		62	0	—		—		—		62	0
Angers	2016–17	Ligue 1	0	0	0	0	0	0	—		0	0
Angers	2017–18	Ligue 1	0	0	0	0	1	0	—		1	0
Angers	2018–19	Ligue 1	0	0	0	0	0	0	—		0	0
Angers	2019–20	Ligue 1	0	0	0	0	0	0	—		0	0
Angers	2021–22	Ligue 1	10	0	0	0	—		—		10	0
Angers	Total		10	0	0	0	1	0	—		11	0
Cholet (loan)	2020–21	National	32	0	1	0	—		—		33	0
Caen	2022–23	Ligue 2	37	0	2	0	—		—		39	0
Caen	2023–24	Ligue 2	34	0	0	0	—		—		34	0
Caen	2024–25	Ligue 2	26	0	0	0	—		—		26	0
Caen	Total		97	0	2	0	—		—		99	0
Career total			213	0	3	0	1	0	0	0	217	0

=== International ===
As of match played 10 September 2024

Appearances and goals by national team and year
National team	Year	Apps	Goals
Algeria
Algeria	2022	2	0
Algeria	2023	8	0
Algeria	2024	9	0
Total		19	0
