= Noé Lebreton =

French footballer (born 2004)

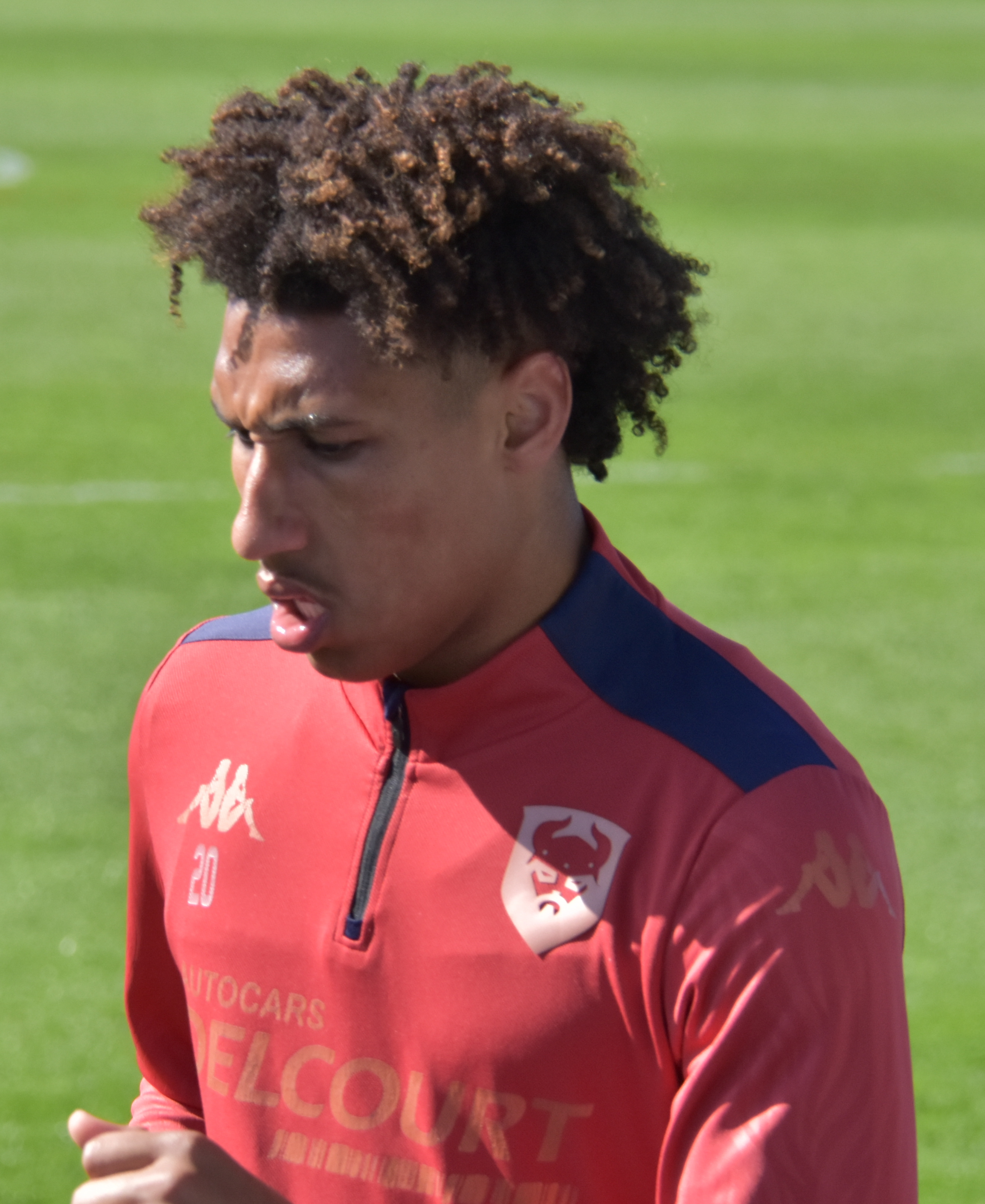
- Noé Lebreton with Caen in 2025

Personal information
- Date of birth: 22 April 2004 (age 22)
- Place of birth: Avranches, France
- Height: 1.78 m (5 ft 10 in)
- Position: Defensive midfielder

Team information
- Current team: NEC
- Number: 20

Youth career
- 2010–2017: Avranches
- 2017–2021: Caen

Senior career*
Years	Team	Apps	(Gls)
2021–2023	Caen II	24	(4)
2022–2025	Caen	67	(4)
2025–	NEC Nijmegen	33	(7)

International career^{‡}
2024	France U20	6	(1)
2026–	France U21	3	(1)
- * Club domestic league appearances and goals as of 25 October 2026 ‡ National team caps and goals as of 29 September 2026

Noé Lebreton (born 22 April 2004) is a French professional footballer who plays as a defensive midfielder for the Eredivisie club NEC Nijmegen.

== Personal life ==
Lebreton was born in France to a French father and a Senegalese mother.

== Career ==
Lebreton is a youth product of Avranches and Caen, and was promoted to Caen's reserves in 2021. He made his professional debut with Caen in a 2–1 Ligue 2 loss to Rodez AF on 14 May 2022. On 8 July 2022, he signed his first professional contract with Caen.

== Career statistics ==
As of match played 25 October 2026

Appearances and goals by club, season and competition
Club	Season	League			Cup		Europe		Other		Total	
Club	Season	Division	Apps	Goals	Apps	Goals	Apps	Goals	Apps	Goals	Apps	Goals
Caen II	2021–22	CFA	13	0	—		—		—		13	0
Caen II	2022–23	CFA	17	4	—		—		—		17	4
Caen II	2023–24	CFA 2	3	0	—		—		—		3	0
Caen II	Total		24	4	—		—		—		24	4
Caen	2021–22	Ligue 2	1	0	—		—		—		1	0
Caen	2022–23	Ligue 2	6	0	1	0	—		—		7	0
Caen	2023–24	Ligue 2	27	0	3	0	—		—		30	0
Caen	2024–25	Ligue 2	32	4	3	0	—		—		35	4
Caen	2025–26	Ligue 3	1	0	—		—		—		1	0
Caen	Total		67	4	7	0	—		—		74	4
NEC	2025–26	Eredivisie	22	5	5	2	—		—		27	7
NEC	2026–27	Eredivisie	10	2	0	0	7 (Note: Four appearances in UEFA Champions League, three appearances in UEFA Europa League)	0	—		17	1
NEC	Total		32	6	5	2	7	0	—		44	8
Career total			123	14	12	2	7	0	0	0	142	16
