= Alexandre Mendy (footballer, born 1994) =

Footballer (born 1994)

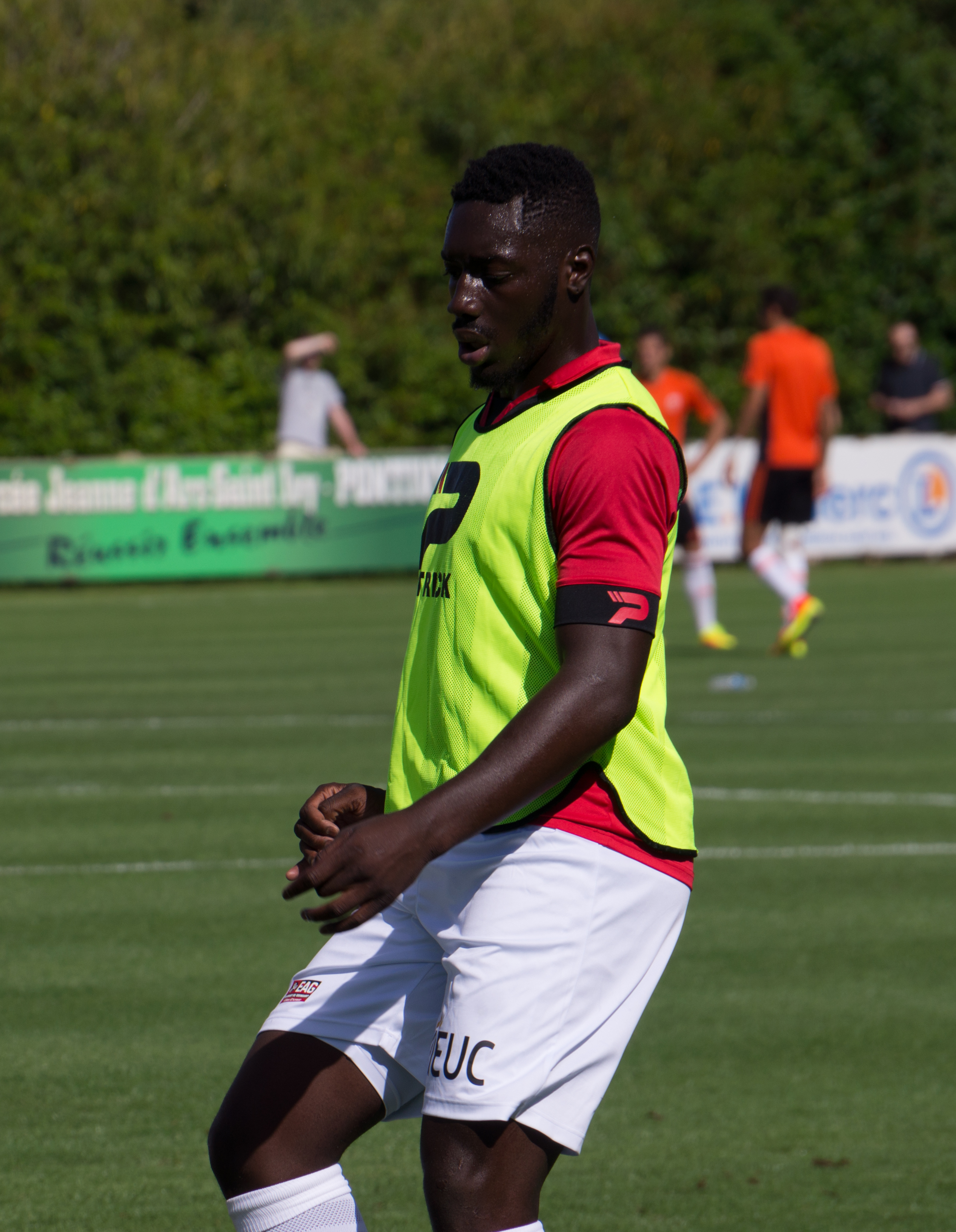
- Mendy with Guingamp in 2016

Personal information
- Date of birth: 20 March 1994 (age 32)
- Place of birth: Toulon, France
- Height: 1.84 m (6 ft 0 in)
- Position: Forward

Team information
- Current team: Al Faisaly
- Number: 19

Senior career*
Years	Team	Apps	(Gls)
2013–2016	Nice B	19	(12)
2013–2016	Nice	18	(1)
2014	→ Strasbourg (loan)	13	(6)
2014–2015	→ Nîmes (loan)	16	(3)
2016–2017	Guingamp	22	(3)
2017–2020	Bordeaux	16	(4)
2018–2019	→ Guingamp (loan)	16	(3)
2019–2020	→ Brest (loan)	20	(3)
2020–2025	Caen	166	(69)
2025–2026	Montpellier	33	(12)
2026–	Al Faisaly	9	(5)

International career
2020–2021	Guinea-Bissau	7	(0)
- * Club domestic league appearances and goals as of 21:55, 21 October 2026 (UTC)

Alexandre Mendy (born 20 March 1994) is a professional footballer who plays as a forward for Saudi Pro League club Al Faisaly. Born in France, he played for the Guinea-Bissau national team.

== Club career ==
A youth product of Nice, Mendy was loaned six months in 2014 to semi-professional club Strasbourg to gain more playing time. He was again loaned eight months later to Ligue 2 side Nîmes, where he made his full professional in September 2014, in a 2–0 Ligue 2 defeat against Gazélec Ajaccio.

On 21 June 2016, Mendy signed for Ligue 1 side Guingamp. The transfer fee was estimated at between €600,000 and 1 million.

In June 2017, Mendy moved to league rivals Bordeaux, signing a four-year deal.

On 29 October 2024, Mendy became the all-time top scorer of Caen after netting a brace in a 3–0 win over Martigues. His second goal of the match was his 70th for Caen, surpassing Cyrille Watier's previous record of 69 goals for the club.

== International career ==
Mendy is of Senegalese and Bissau-Guinean descent. He was called up to represent the Guinea-Bissau national team in October 2020. Mendy debuted for Guinea-Bissau in a 1-0 Africa Cup of Nations qualification loss to Senegal on 15 November 2020.

== Personal life ==
Mendy is the cousin of fellow footballers Nampalys Mendy and Bafétimbi Gomis.

== Career statistics ==
=== Club ===
As of match played 19 October 2026

Appearances and goals by club, season and competition
Club	Season	League			National cup (Note: Includes Coupe de France, King's Cup)		League cup (Note: Includes Coupe de la Ligue)		Continental		Total	
Club	Season	Division	Apps	Goals	Apps	Goals	Apps	Goals	Apps	Goals	Apps	Goals
Nice B	2013–14	CFA	13	9	—		—		—		13	9
Nice B	2015–16	CFA	6	3	—		—		—		6	3
Nice B	Total		19	12	—		—		—		19	12
Strasbourg (loan)	2013–14	National	13	6	0	0	—		—		13	6
Nîmes (loan)	2014–15	Ligue 2	16	3	1	0	0	0	—		17	3
Nîmes B (loan)	2014–15	CFA 2	9	6	—		—		—		9	6
Nice	2015–16	Ligue 1	18	1	1	1	2	4	—		21	6
Guingamp	2016–17	Ligue 1	22	3	4	3	3	0	—		29	6
Guingamp B	2016–17	CFA 2	1	0	—		—		—		1	0
Bordeaux	2017–18	Ligue 1	16	4	0	0	0	0	2 (Note: Appearances in UEFA Europa League)	0	18	4
Bordeaux B	2018–19	National 2	4	3	—		—		—		4	3
Guingamp (loan)	2018–19	Ligue 1	16	3	3	1	4	1	—		23	5
Brest (loan)	2019–20	Ligue 1	20	3	1	0	3	0	—		24	3
Caen	2020–21	Ligue 2	30	4	2	1	—		—		32	5
Caen	2021–22	Ligue 2	32	16	0	0	—		—		32	16
Caen	2022–23	Ligue 2	37	19	2	2	—		—		39	21
Caen	2023–24	Ligue 2	37	22	2	1	—		—		39	23
Caen	2024–25	Ligue 2	30	8	3	3	—		—		33	11
Caen	Total		166	69	9	7	—		—		175	76
Montpellier	2025–26	Ligue 2	33	12	4	3	—		—		37	15
Al Faisaly	2026–27	Saudi Pro League	9	5	1	0	—		—		10	5
Career total			362	130	24	15	12	5	2	0	400	150

=== International ===
Appearances and goals by national team and year
National team	Year	Apps	Goals
Guinea-Bissau
Guinea-Bissau	2020	2	0
Guinea-Bissau	2021	5	0
Total		7	0

== Honours ==
Guingamp

- Coupe de la Ligue runner-up: 2018–19

Individual

- Ligue 2 top goalscorer: 2023–24
- UNFP Ligue 2 Team of the Year: 2023–24
