= Godson Kyeremeh =

French footballer (born 2000)

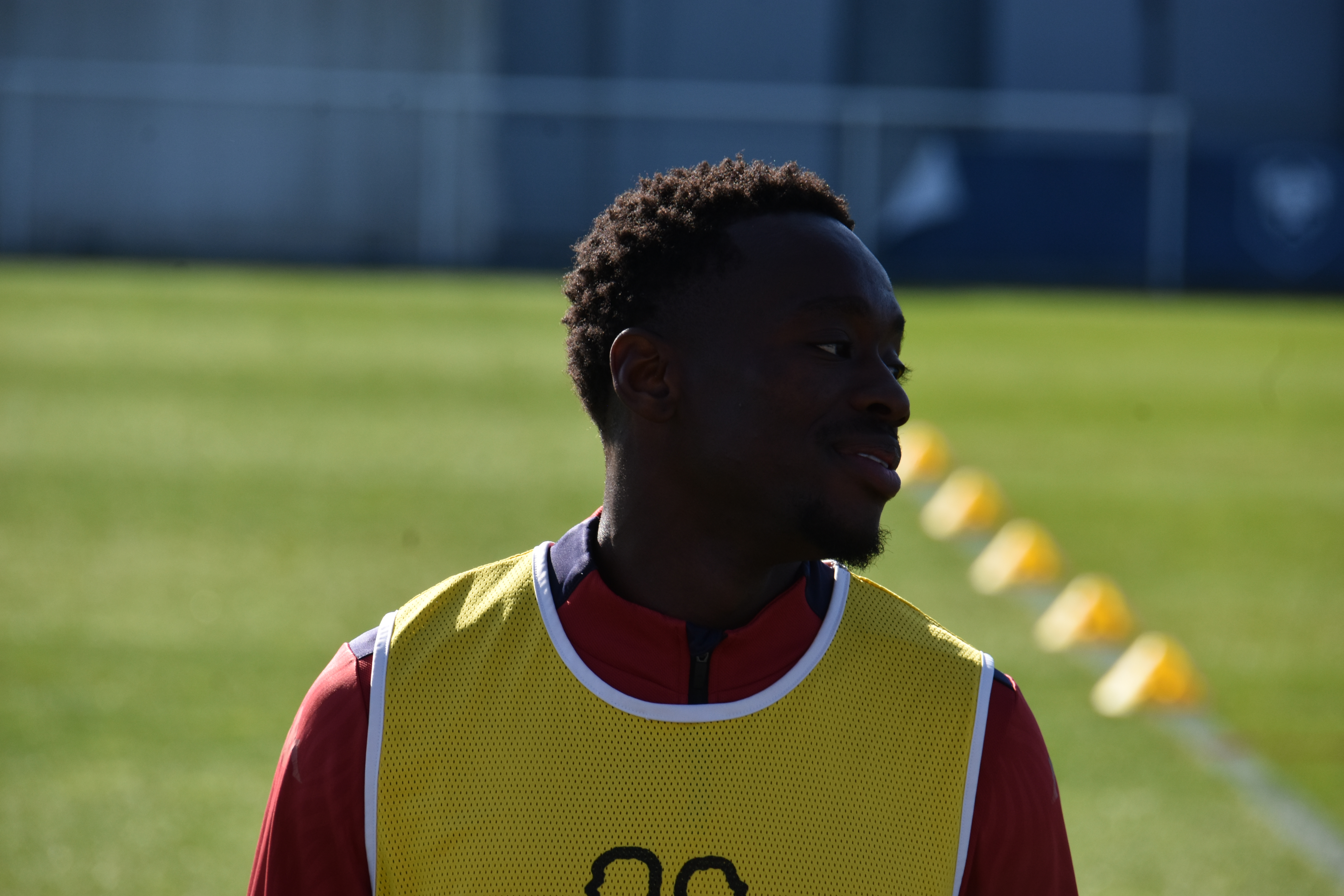
- Kyeremeh in 2025

Personal information
- Date of birth: 14 June 2000 (age 26)
- Place of birth: Melun, France
- Height: 1.75 m (5 ft 9 in)
- Position: Midfielder

Team information
- Current team: Red Star
- Number: 27

Youth career
- 2015–2018: Caen

Senior career*
Years	Team	Apps	(Gls)
2018–2020	Caen B	41	(9)
2019–2025	Caen	103	(11)
2021–2022	→ Annecy (loan)	44	(10)
2025–2026	Le Havre	13	(1)
2026–	Red Star	1	(0)
- * Club domestic league appearances and goals as of 4 September 2026

Godson Kyeremeh (born 14 June 2000) is a French professional footballer who plays as a midfielder for Ligue 2 club Red Star.

== Career ==
On 18 January 2020, Kyeremeh signed his first professional contract with Caen for three years. He made his professional debut for Caen in a 5–0 Coupe de France loss to Montpellier on 19 January 2020. Kyeremeh was loaned to Annecy in the Championnat National on 1 February 2021. On 30 July 2022, Kyeremeh made his Ligue 2 debut as a substitute in a 1–0 away win over Nîmes. He scored a last-minute goal to win the match for Caen.

On 11 July 2025, Kyeremeh moved to Le Havre in Ligue 1 on a two-year contract.

== Personal life ==
Born in France, Kyeremeh is of Ghanaian descent.

== Career statistics ==
As of match played 26 April 2026

Appearances and goals by club, season and competition
Club	Season	League			Cup		Other		Total	
Club	Season	Division	Apps	Goals	Apps	Goals	Apps	Goals	Apps	Goals
Caen B	2017–18	National 3	1	0	—		—		1	0
Caen B	2018–19	National 3	16	4	—		—		16	4
Caen B	2019–20	National 3	15	4	—		—		15	4
Caen B	2020–21	National 3	9	1	—		—		9	1
Caen B	Total		41	9	—		—		41	9
Caen	2018–19	Ligue 2	0	0	1	0	—		1	0
Caen	2019–20	Ligue 2	0	0	1	0	—		1	0
Caen	2020–21	Ligue 2	0	0	1	0	—		1	0
Caen	2022–23	Ligue 2	38	6	2	0	—		40	6
Caen	2023–24	Ligue 2	34	3	3	2	—		37	5
Caen	2024–25	Ligue 2	31	2	2	2	—		33	4
Caen	Total		103	11	10	4	—		113	15
Annecy (loan)	2020–21	National	11	2	3	0	—		14	2
Annecy (loan)	2021–22	National	33	8	0	0	—		33	8
Annecy (loan)	Total		44	10	3	0	—		47	10
Le Havre	2025–26	Ligue 1	13	1	1	0	—		14	1
Career total			201	31	14	4	0	0	215	35
