= LB Châteauroux =

French football club, based in Châteauroux

- Full name: La Berrichonne de Châteauroux
- Nicknames: La Berri; La Berrichonne
- Founded: 1916; 110 years ago
- Ground: Stade Gaston Petit, Châteauroux
- Capacity: 17,173
- Owner: ZLZ Holding
- President: Djamel Zemmar
- Manager: Valentin Guichard
- League: Championnat National 1
- 2025–26: Championnat National, 16th of 17 (relegated)
- Website: www.berrichonne.net
Home colours	Away colours

La Berrichonne de Châteauroux (French pronunciation: [la bɛʁiʃɔn də ʃɑtoʁu]), commonly referred to as La Berrichonne, Châteauroux or simply, LBC, is a French association football club based in Châteauroux. The full name comes from the old Duchy of Berry, in which the city of Châteauroux is located. The football team is a part of a sports club that consists of several other sports and was founded in 1916. They play in the Championnat National 1, the fourth division of French football. The club has played only one season in Division 1; the 1997–98 season.

In 2004, Châteauroux reached the final of the 2003–04 Coupe de France. The team was defeated 1–0 by Paris Saint-Germain, but still qualified for the following season's UEFA Cup because Paris Saint-Germain finished second in the first division. Châteauroux lost in the first round to Belgian club Club Brugge.

Châteauroux plays its home fixtures at the 17,173 capacity Stade Gaston Petit in front of crowds averaging between 6,000 and 7,000. Visitors are directed to one end of the Credit Agricole stand. The team strip is a deep red and blue with a vertical striped shirt and blue shorts. Châteauroux's kit manufacturer is Nike.

== Honours ==
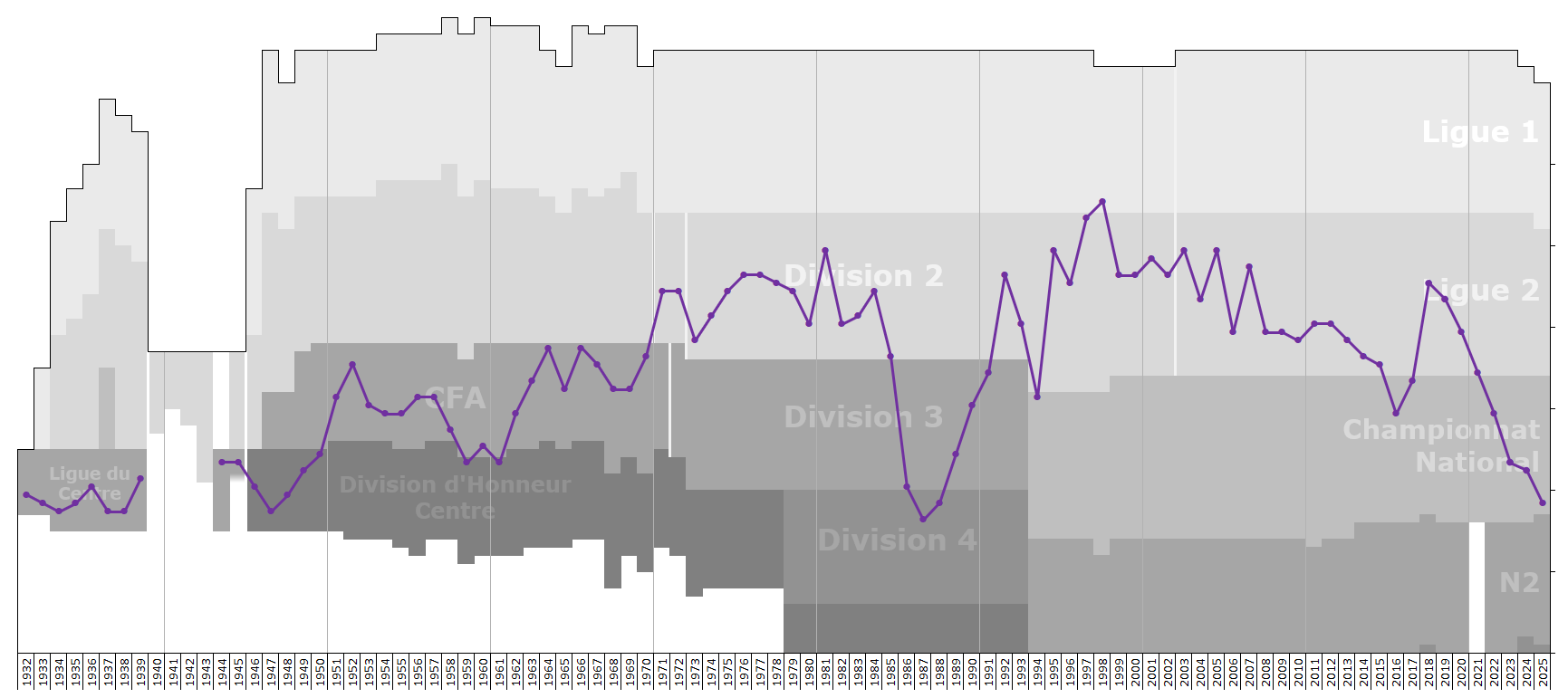
Historical league performance chart of La Berrichonne de Châteauroux

- Division 2
  - Champions (1): 1996–97
- Championnat National
  - Champions (1): 2016–17
- Coupe de France
  - Runners-up (1): 2003–04

== Players ==
=== Current squad ===
As of 28 March 2026

Note: Flags indicate national team as defined under FIFA eligibility rules; some limited exceptions apply. Players may hold more than one non-FIFA nationality.

No.	Pos.	Nation	Player
1	GK	FRA	Enzo Tostivint
4	DF	FRA	Djibril Diarra
5	MF	FRA	Paul Wade
6	DF	FRA	Grégory Kelo
7	FW	COM	Aymeric Ahmed
8	MF	FRA	Samba Dembélé
9	FW	FRA	Noa Mupemba (on loan from Laval)
10	MF	FRA	Ronaldo Freitas
11	FW	MLI	Amadou Konaté
12	DF	FRA	Jad Koembo
13	FW	FRA	Corentin Jean
14	FW	FRA	Yannis Verdier
16	GK	FRA	Lucas Lavallée
18	MF	FRA	Georges Tjomb

No.	Pos.	Nation	Player
19	FW	MTQ	Loïck Piquionne
20	MF	ALG	Issam Bouaoune
21	MF	FRA	Yanis Chahid
22	MF	FRA	Théo Trinker
23	DF	COM	Akim Djaha
24	DF	CPV	Anderson Gonçalves
25	MF	FRA	Gaoussou Traoré
26	FW	MLI	Bakary Sako
27	FW	ALG	Willsem Boussaid
28	DF	COD	Schinéar Mopila
29	DF	MTN	Lassana Diakhaby
30	GK	SEN	Moussa Ba
39	DF	FRA	Mehdi Beneddine
—	FW	FRA	Gwenn Foulon

=== Notable players ===
- (Ivory Coast) Ange-Yoan Bonny
- (France) Rod Fanni
- (France) Florent Malouda
- (France) Jean-Philippe Mateta
- (France) Steve Savidan
- (France) Giovani Versini

== Managers ==
- André Roder (1938–39)
- Roger Cabanis (1943–46)
- Gérard Woczniak (1946–52)
- Charles Carville (1952–53)
- Antonin Tichy (1953–54)
- Jo Rabstejneck (?-?)
- François Maestroni (?-?)
- Albert Dubreucq (September 1957–58)
- Maurice Lafont (1962–63)
- Henri Burda (1963–65)
- Léon Deladerrière (1965–67)
- Robert Vicot (1967–70)
- André Strappe (1970–71)
- Gérard Woczniak and Ferrandis (1971–73)
- Lucien Troupel (1973–80)
- Hervé Revelli (1980–83)
- Anton Nieroba (1983–85)
- Philippe Leroux (1985 – February 1986)
- Karim Ibrahim (February 1986-1986)
- Philippe Besset (1986–87)
- Lionel Sachy (1987–88)
- Alec Hrnic (1988–89)
- Jacky Lemée (1989)
- Andrzej Szarmach (1989–91)
- Joachim Marx (1991 – October 1992)
- Victor Zvunka (October 1992–98)
- Florian Fontaine (June 1998 – May 2005)
- Didier Ollé-Nicole (2005 – March 2006)
- Cédric Daury (March 2006–08)
- Frédéric Zago (March 2007, Caretaker)
- Christian Sarramagna (2008)
- Dominique Bijotat (2008–09)
- Jean-Pierre Papin (2009–10)
- Didier Tholot (2010–13)
- Jean-Louis Garcia (2013–14)
- Pascal Gastien (2014–15)
- Cédric Daury (2015–16)
- Michel Estevan (2016–17)
- Jean-Luc Vasseur (2017–18)
- Nicolas Usaï (2018–20)
- Benoît Cauet (2021)
- Marco Simone (2021)
- Mathieu Chabert (2021–22)
- Maxence Flachez (2022–23)
- Olivier Saragaglia (2023–24)
- Patrice Lair and Jaroslav Plašil (2024)
- Cris (2024–25)
- Valentin Guichard (2025–)

== Affiliated clubs ==
- (England) Sheffield United FC (2020–present)
- (India) Kerala United FC (2020–present)
- (United Arab Emirates) Al-Hilal United (2020–present)
- (Belgium) K Beerschot VA (2020–present)
