= Brahim Traoré =

French footballer (born 2004)

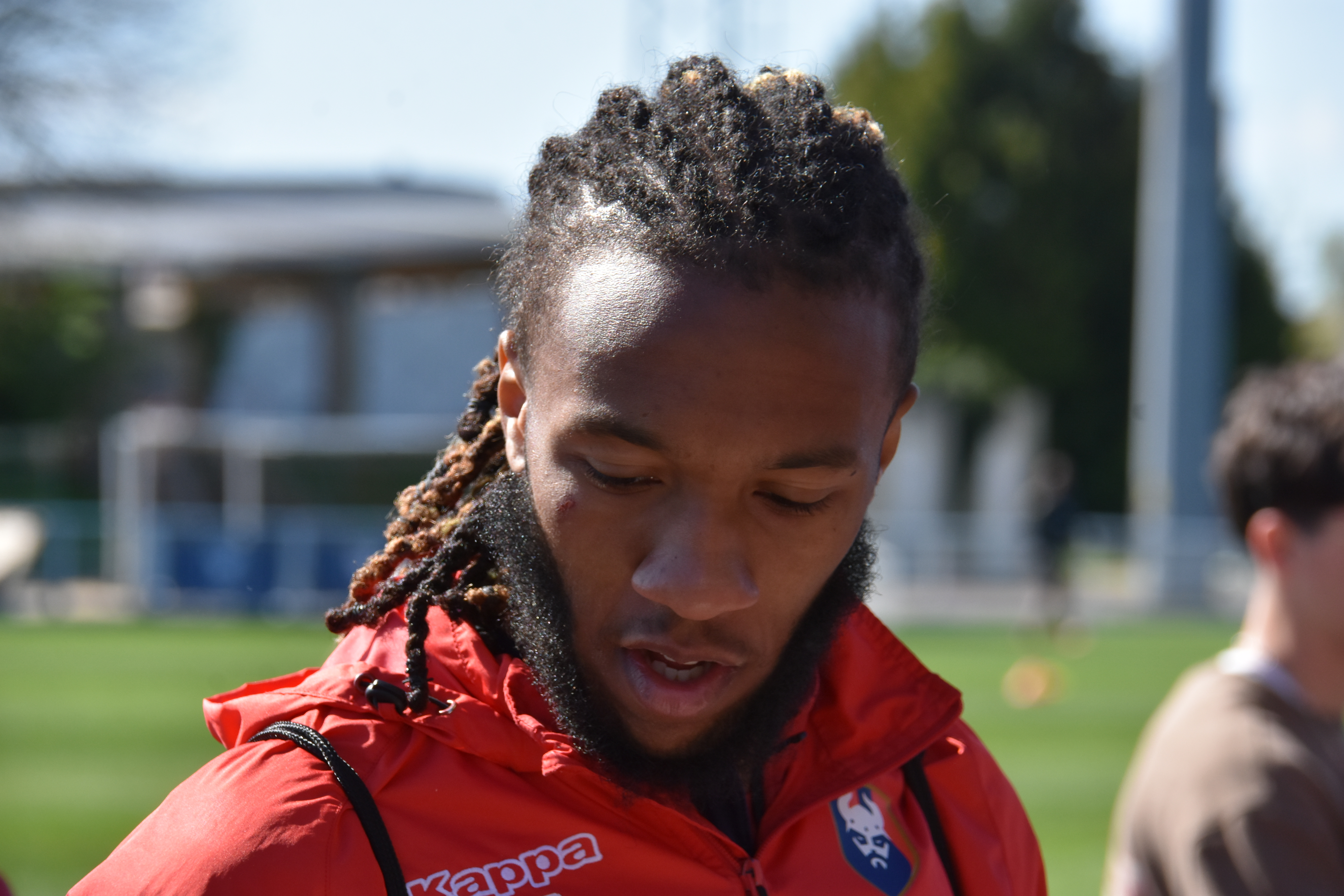
- Traoré with Caen in 2025

Personal information
- Date of birth: 4 February 2004 (age 22)
- Place of birth: Rennes, France
- Height: 1.91 m (6 ft 3 in)
- Position: Centre-back

Team information
- Current team: Cracovia
- Number: 61

Youth career
- 2010–2015: CO Céaucé
- 2015–2017: FC Flers
- 2017–2022: Caen

Senior career*
| Years | Team | Apps | (Gls) |
| 2020–2023 | Caen B | 12 | (0) |
| 2021–2025 | Caen | 88 | (0) |
| 2023 | → SL16 FC (loan) | 12 | (0) |
| 2025– | Cracovia | 14 | (0) |
| 2025 | Cracovia II | 1 | (0) |

International career
| 2019–2020 | France U16 | 8 | (0) |
| 2021–2022 | France U18 | 6 | (0) |
| 2023–2024 | France U20 | 11 | (1) |
- * Club domestic league appearances and goals as of 16:41, 29 May 2026 (UTC)

Brahim Traoré (born 4 February 2004) is a French professional footballer who plays as a centre-back for Ekstraklasa club Cracovia.

== Club career ==
A former youth academy player of CO Céaucé and FC Flers, Traoré joined Caen in May 2017 by signing an aspiring contract for five years. He made his professional debut on 3 April 2021 in a 1–1 draw against Pau. This made him the second youngest player to appear for Caen in club history, only behind M'Baye Niang.

On 31 January 2023, Traoré was loaned by Belgian club SL16 FC, the reserves squad of Standard Liège, with an option to buy. He finally returned to Caen at the end of the season.

On 31 August 2025, Traoré signed a four-year contract with Polish club Cracovia.

== International career ==
Born in France, Traoré is of Burkinabé descent. He has represented France at different youth levels.

== Career statistics ==
As of match played 16 May 2026

Appearances and goals by club, season and competition
| Club | Season | League | | | National cup (Note: Includes Coupe de France, Polish Cup) | | Europe | | Other | | Total | |
| Club | Season | Division | Apps | Goals | Apps | Goals | Apps | Goals | Apps | Goals | Apps | Goals |
|---|---|---|---|---|---|---|---|---|---|---|---|---|
| Caen B | 2020–21 | Championnat National 2 | 1 | 0 | — | | — | | — | | 1 | 0 |
| Caen B | 2021–22 | Championnat National 2 | 2 | 0 | — | | — | | — | | 2 | 0 |
| Caen B | 2022–23 | Championnat National 2 | 9 | 0 | — | | — | | — | | 9 | 0 |
| Caen B | Total | | 12 | 0 | — | | — | | — | | 12 | 0 |
| Caen | 2020–21 | Ligue 2 | 6 | 0 | 0 | 0 | — | | — | | 6 | 0 |
| Caen | 2021–22 | Ligue 2 | 16 | 0 | 1 | 0 | — | | — | | 17 | 0 |
| Caen | 2022–23 | Ligue 2 | 3 | 0 | 1 | 0 | — | | — | | 4 | 0 |
| Caen | 2023–24 | Ligue 2 | 37 | 0 | 1 | 0 | — | | — | | 38 | 0 |
| Caen | 2024–25 | Ligue 2 | 25 | 0 | 1 | 0 | — | | — | | 26 | 0 |
| Caen | 2025–26 | Championnat National | 1 | 0 | — | | — | | — | | 1 | 0 |
| Caen | Total | | 88 | 0 | 4 | 0 | — | | — | | 92 | 0 |
| SL16 FC (loan) | 2022–23 | Challenger Pro League | 12 | 0 | 0 | 0 | — | | — | | 12 | 0 |
| Cracovia | 2025–26 | Ekstraklasa | 14 | 0 | 2 | 0 | — | | — | | 16 | 0 |
| Cracovia II | 2025–26 | III liga, group IV | 1 | 0 | — | | — | | — | | 1 | 0 |
| Career total | | | 127 | 0 | 6 | 0 | 0 | 0 | 0 | 0 | 133 | 0 |
