= Antoni Nieroba =

Polish footballer and manager (1939–2021)

Personal information
- Full name: Antoni Jan Nieroba
- Date of birth: 17 January 1939
- Place of birth: Chorzów, Poland
- Date of death: 24 June 2021 (aged 82)
- Place of death: Chorzów, Poland
- Position: Midfielder

Youth career
- 1952–1956: Ruch Chorzów

Senior career*
Years	Team	Apps	(Gls)
1956–1972	Ruch Chorzów	347	(20)
1972–1974	LB Châteauroux	57	(2)

International career
1959–1967	Poland	17	(0)

Managerial career
- 1980–1982: Rozwój Katowice
- 1983–1985: LB Châteauroux
- 2001: AKS Chorzów
- * Club domestic league appearances and goals

Antoni Nieroba (17 January 1939 – 24 June 2021) was a Polish football manager and player. He played 17 times for Poland. With 347 games played, he holds the all-time record for most top division appearances for Ruch Chorzów. Nieroba died on 24 June 2021, at the age of 82.

== Honours ==
=== Player ===
Ruch Chorzów

- Ekstraklasa: 1960, 1967–68

== Sources ==
- Barreaud, Marc (1998). Dictionnaire des footballeurs étrangers du championnat professionnel français (1932-1997). L'Harmattan, Paris. ISBN 2-7384-6608-7.
- Profile at Ruch Chorzów official website
