= Akim Djaha =

Footballer (born 1998)

Personal information
- Date of birth: 14 September 1998 (age 28)
- Place of birth: Bordeaux, France
- Height: 1.78 m (5 ft 10 in)
- Position: Defender

Team information
- Current team: Châteauroux
- Number: 23

Youth career
- Angers
- Trélissac

Senior career*
Years	Team	Apps	(Gls)
2016	Angers II	3	(0)
2016–2020	Trélissac	61	(0)
2020–2021	Vannes	7	(0)
2021–2025	Martigues	100	(0)
2025–	Châteauroux	11	(0)
2025–	Châteauroux B	6	(0)

International career^{‡}
2021–	Comoros	3	(0)
- * Club domestic league appearances and goals as of 23 June 2026 ‡ National team caps and goals as of 28 March 2023

Akim Djaha (born 14 September 1998) is a professional footballer who plays as a defender for Championnat National 1 club Châteauroux. Born in France, he plays for the Comoros national team.

== Club career ==
Djaha is a former youth academy player of Angers and Trélissac. He joined Vannes in May 2020.

On 8 June 2021, Djaha joined Martigues.

== International career ==
Born in France, Djaha represents Comoros in international football. He received maiden call-up to Comoros national team on 21 June 2021 for FIFA Arab Cup qualification match against Palestine. He made his international debut three days later in the same match, which ended in a 5–1 defeat for Comoros.

== Career statistics ==
=== International ===
As of match played 28 March 2023

Appearances and goals by national team and year
National team	Year	Apps	Goals
Comoros	2021	1	0
Comoros	2022	0	0
Comoros	2023	2	0
Comoros	2024	0	0
Total		3	0
