= Dieudonné Gaucho Debohi =

Ivorian footballer (born 2001)

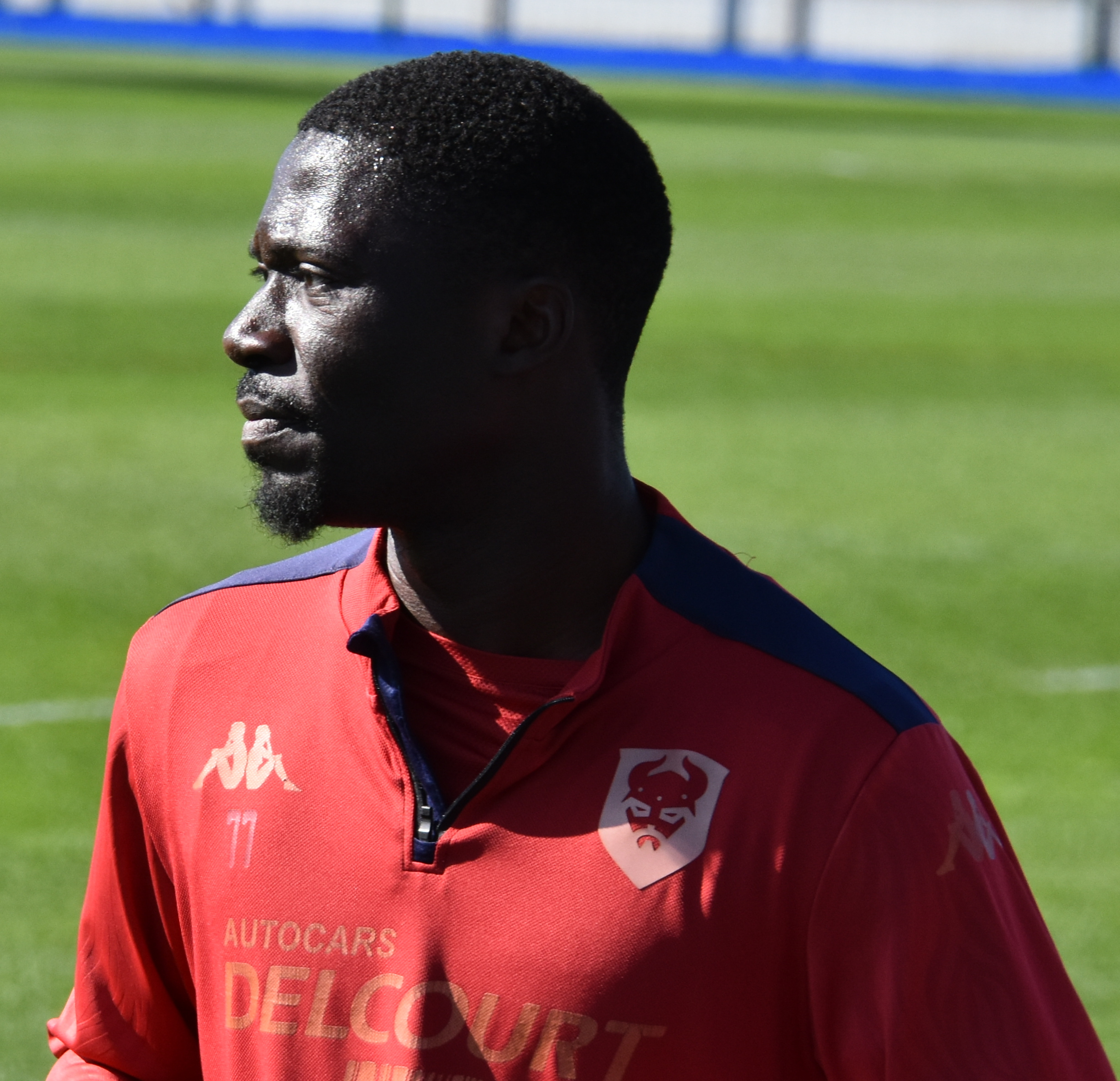
- Gaucho Debohi with Caen in 2025

Personal information
- Date of birth: 15 January 2001 (age 25)
- Place of birth: Kouibly, Ivory Coast
- Height: 1.85 m (6 ft 1 in)
- Positions: Defensive midfielder; centre-back

Team information
- Current team: Raków Częstochowa
- Number: 77

Senior career*
Years	Team	Apps	(Gls)
2021–2022	SOL FC		
2021	→ Klubi 04 (loan)	24	(1)
2021	→ HJK (loan)	0	(0)
2022	→ Caen B (loan)	0	(0)
2022–2023	Caen B	21	(1)
2022–2026	Caen	79	(1)
2026–	Raków Częstochowa	4	(0)

International career^{‡}
2026–	Uganda	1	(0)
- * Club domestic league appearances and goals as of 20:16, 5 October 2026 (UTC) ‡ National team caps and goals as of 20:16, 5 October 2026 (UTC)

Dieudonné "Didi" Gaucho Debohi (born 15 January 2001) is an professional footballer who plays as a defensive midfielder and centre-back for Ekstraklasa club Raków Częstochowa. Born in Ivory Coast, he plays for the Uganda national team.

== Club career ==
In 2021, Gaucho Debohi joined Finnish side Klubi 04 on loan, the reserve team of HJK. On 31 January 2022, he signed for French club Caen on loan until the end of the season, with a mandatory purchase option. He was assigned to the club's reserve team. On 30 August 2022, it was confirmed that Gaucho Debohi had signed a two-year contract with Caen. In the first half of the 2022–23 season, he was described as the "best player" on Caen's reserve team, and made his first two professional appearances in Ligue 2.

On 21 December 2022, Gaucho Debohi appeared as a substitute in a 3–0 Coupe de France win over AF Virois. However, he was serving a suspension due to an accumulation of yellow cards while playing for the reserve team, resulting in AF Virois qualifying over Caen due to his appearance in the match.

On 15 May 2026, Gaucho Debohi agreed to a two-year deal with a two-year option with Polish Ekstraklasa club Raków Częstochowa, beginning with the 2026–27 season.

== International career ==
Since Federation of Uganda Football Associations maintains that Debohi's maternal grandmother was born in Majanji, he made his debut for the Uganda national team on 5 October 2026.

== Career statistics ==
=== Club ===
As of match played 3 September 2026

Appearances and goals by club, season and competition
Club	Season	League			National cup (Note: Includes Suomen Cup, Coupe de France)		Europe		Other		Total	
Club	Season	Division	Apps	Goals	Apps	Goals	Apps	Goals	Apps	Goals	Apps	Goals
HJK (loan)	2021	Veikkausliiga	0	0	1	0	0	0	—		1	0
Klubi 04 (loan)	2021	Ykkönen	24	1	—		—		—		24	1
Caen B	2022–23	National 2	17	1	—		—		—		17	1
Caen B	2023–24	National 3	4	0	—		—		—		4	0
Caen B	Total		21	1	—		—		—		21	1
Caen	2022–23	Ligue 2	3	0	1	0	—		—		4	0
Caen	2023–24	Ligue 2	22	1	3	1	—		—		25	2
Caen	2024–25	Ligue 2	29	0	3	0	—		—		32	0
Caen	2025–26	National	25	0	0	0	—		—		25	0
Caen	Total		79	1	7	1	—		—		86	2
Raków Częstochowa	2026–27	Ekstraklasa	4	0	0	0	4 (Note: Appearances in UEFA Conference League)	0	—		8	0
Career total			128	3	8	1	4	0	0	0	140	4

=== International ===
As of match played 5 October 2026

Appearances and goals by national team and year
National team	Year	Apps	Goals
Uganda
Uganda	2026	1	0
Total		1	0
