= Ilyes Najim =

French footballer (born 2002)

Personal information
- Date of birth: 10 September 2002 (age 24)
- Place of birth: Villeneuve-Saint-Georges, France
- Height: 1.73 m (5 ft 8 in)
- Position: Forward

Team information
- Current team: Beveren
- Number: 7

Youth career
- 2009–2014: Sénart-Moissy
- 2014–2016: Clairefontaine
- 2016-2020: Caen

Senior career*
Years	Team	Apps	(Gls)
2019–2025	Caen II	30	(5)
2021–2025	Caen	17	(2)
2022–2023	→ FBBP01 (loan)	30	(4)
2023	→ Martigues (loan)	15	(1)
2024	→ Cholet (loan)	18	(1)
2025-	Beveren	12	(2)
- * Club domestic league appearances and goals as of 19 April 2026

Ilyes Najim (born 10 September 2002) is a French professional footballer who plays as a forward for Challenger Pro League club Beveren.

== Club career ==
On 1 June 2020, Najim signed a pre-professional contract with SM Caen. Najim made his debut with Caen in a 1–1 Ligue 2 win over Pau FC on 3 April 2021. On 30 May 2022, he signed his first professional contract with Caen until 2025.

On 5 July 2022, Najim was loaned to FBBP01.
