= Valentin Henry =

French footballer (born 1993)

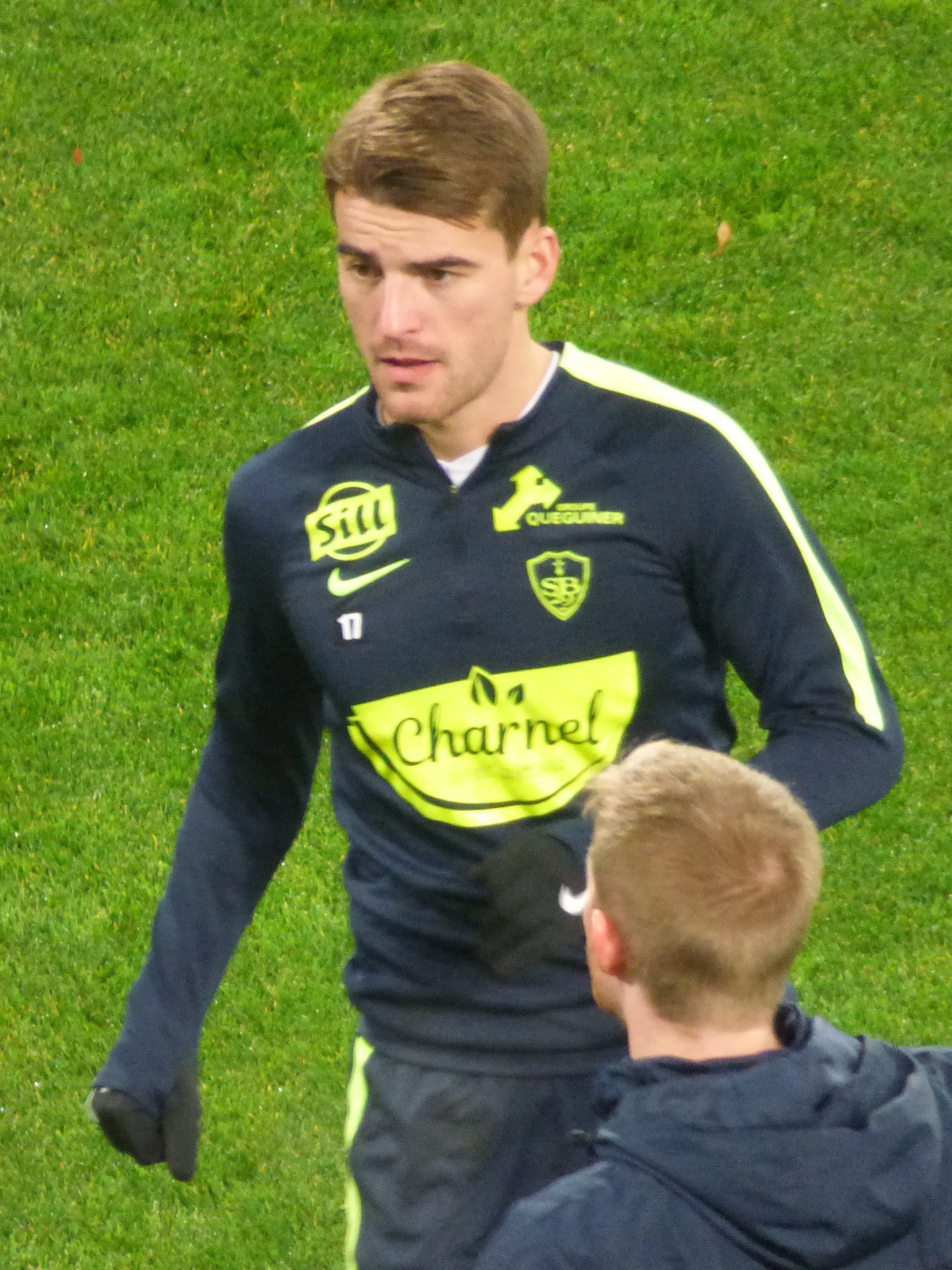
- Henry in 2018

Personal information
- Date of birth: 18 September 1993 (age 33)
- Place of birth: Brest, France
- Height: 1.80 m (5 ft 11 in)
- Positions: Defender; midfielder

Senior career*
Years	Team	Apps	(Gls)
2012–2019	Brest B	98	(11)
2015–2019	Brest	26	(0)
2019–2021	Rodez	57	(4)
2021–2023	Sochaux	50	(1)
2023–2026	Caen	63	(1)
- * Club domestic league appearances and goals as of 23 June 2026

Valentin Henry (born 18 September 1993) is a French professional footballer who plays as a centre-back.

== Club career ==
On 14 June 2021, he joined Sochaux on a two-year contract. He signed in 2023 another two-year contract with SM Caen, another club in Ligue 2.
