= Julien Anziani =

French footballer (born 1999)

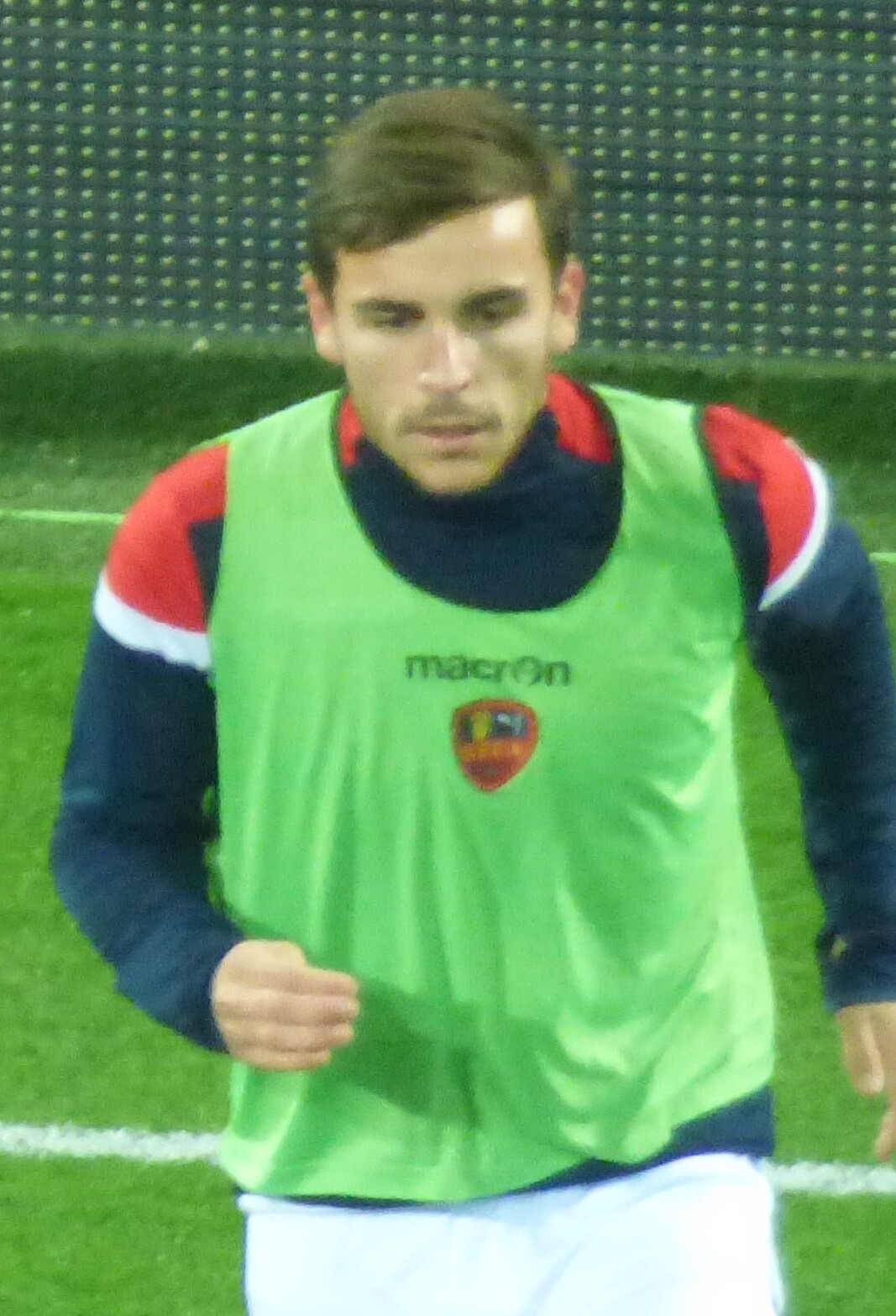
- Anziani with Gazélec Ajaccio in 2018

Personal information
- Date of birth: 23 June 1999 (age 27)
- Place of birth: Ajaccio, France
- Height: 1.76 m (5 ft 9 in)
- Position: Midfielder

Team information
- Current team: Manisa
- Number: 23

Youth career
- Gazélec Ajaccio

Senior career*
Years	Team	Apps	(Gls)
2017–2020	Gazélec Ajaccio	32	(1)
2020–2021	Avranches	30	(3)
2020–2021	Avranches B	2	(1)
2021–2022	Bastia-Borgo	32	(4)
2022–2024	Dunkerque	69	(7)
2024–2025	Ajaccio	34	(4)
2025–2026	Sarıyer	21	(4)
2026	Pau	13	(2)
2026–	Manisa	6	(4)
- * Club domestic league appearances and goals as of 8 September 2026

Julien Anziani (born 23 June 1999) is a French professional footballer who plays as a midfielder for Turkish TFF 1. Lig club Manisa.

== Career ==
Anziani signed his first professional contract with Gazélec Ajaccio on 20 June 2017. He made his professional debut for Gazélec Ajaccio in a 5–0 Ligue 2 loss to Reims on 19 September 2017.

In 2020, Anziani signed for Avranches. In August 2021, he moved to Bastia-Borgo.

On 3 June 2022, Anziani agreed to join Dunkerque for the 2022–23 season.

On 7 July 2025, Anziani joined Sarıyer in TFF 1. Lig.

== Career statistics ==
As of match played 13 May 2022

Appearances and goals by club, season and competition
Club	Season	League			National cup		Other		Total	
Club	Season	Division	Apps	Goals	Apps	Goals	Apps	Goals	Apps	Goals
Gazélec Ajaccio	2017–18	Ligue 2	5	0	2	1	0	0	7	1
Gazélec Ajaccio	2018–19	Ligue 2	11	0	2	0	1 (Note: Appearances in Coupe de la Ligue)	0	14	0
Gazélec Ajaccio	2019–20	National	16	1	1	0	2	0	19	1
Gazélec Ajaccio	Total		32	1	5	1	3	0	40	2
Avranches	2020–21	National	30	3	0	0	—		30	3
Avranches B	2020–21	National 3	2	1	—		—		2	1
Bastia-Borgo	2021–22	National	32	4	2	0	—		34	4
Career total			96	9	7	1	3	0	106	10
