= Bilal Brahimi =

French footballer (born 2000)

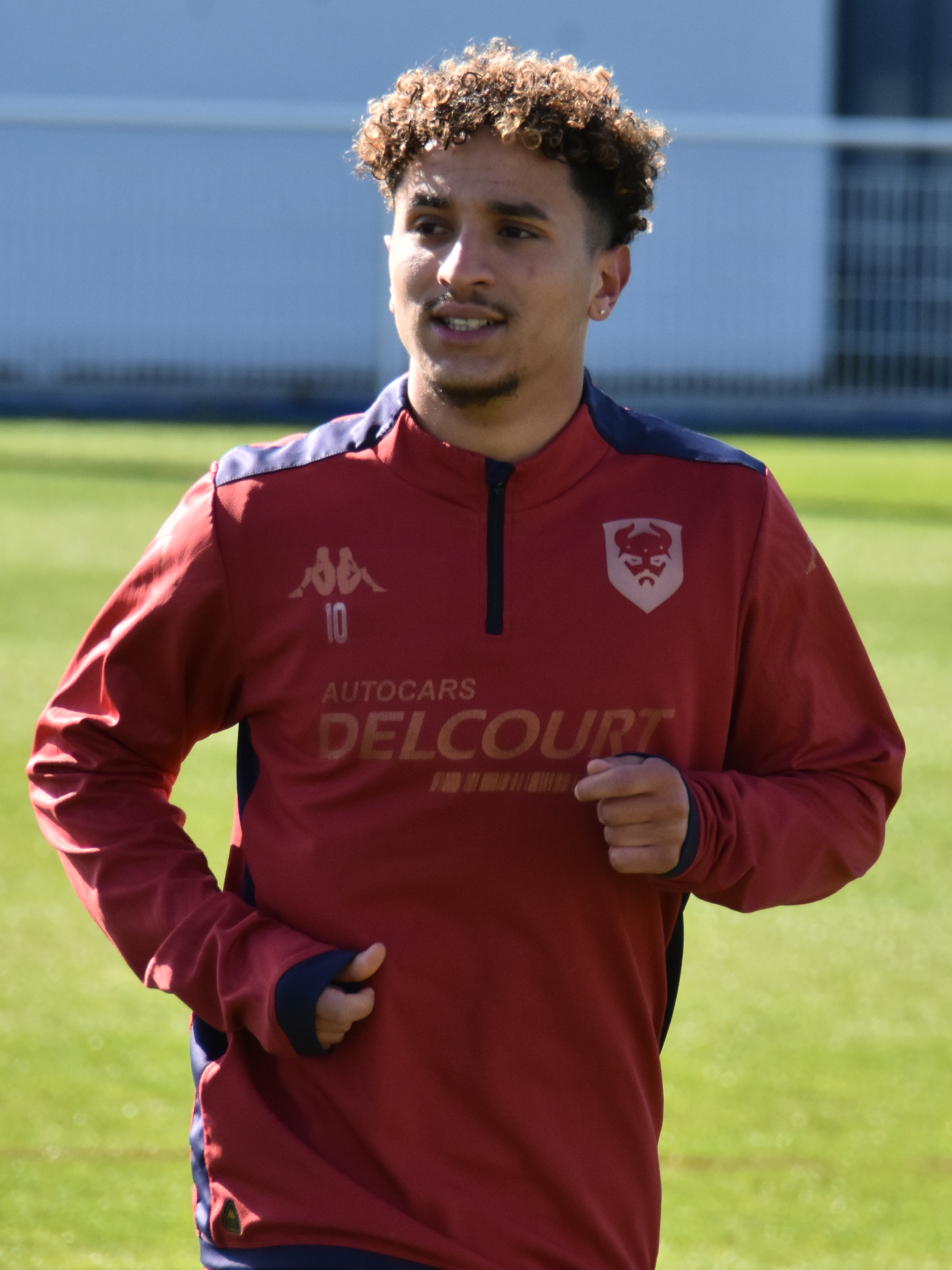
- Brahimi in 2025

Personal information
- Full name: Bilal Brahimi
- Date of birth: 28 March 2000 (age 26)
- Place of birth: Villepinte, France
- Height: 1.75 m (5 ft 9 in)
- Position: Attacking midfielder

Team information
- Current team: Pau FC (on loan from Viborg)
- Number: 21

Youth career
- FC Villepinte
- FC Montfermeil
- –2019: Troyes

Senior career*
Years	Team	Apps	(Gls)
2018–2020	Troyes B	36	(8)
2020–2021	Le Havre B	3	(0)
2021–2022	Dunkerque	36	(3)
2022–2025	Caen	99	(8)
2025–	Viborg	21	(2)
2026–	→ Pau FC (loan)	3	(1)
- * Club domestic league appearances and goals as of 17:23, 17 October 2026 (UTC)

Bilal Brahimi (born 28 March 2000) is a French professional footballer who plays as an attacking midfielder for Ligue 2 club Pau FC, on loan from Danish Superliga club Viborg.

== Career ==
Brahimi began his career at his local club of FC Villepinte, playing there from the ages of 6 to 15. He then went on to play for FC Montfermeil for one season. Brahimi continued his career at Troyes, where he would go on to play 36 matches and score 8 goals for the reserve side. In 2020, he signed for Le Havre; at the club, he made 3 appearances for the reserve team.

In 2021, Brahimi signed for Ligue 2 club Dunkerque. He made his professional debut for the club in a 1–1 draw against Quevilly-Rouen on 24 July 2021.

On 27 June 2022, Brahimi signed a four-year contract with Caen.

Danish club Viborg announced the signing of Brahimi on 1 September 2025, agreeing to a four-year contract. In his debut season, he made 20 appearances for the club, scoring four goals.

Brahimi returned to France on 31 August 2026 with a season-long loan to Pau FC in Ligue 2. Brahimi scored his first goal for the club in a 2–1 win over Guingamp.

== Personal life ==
Born in France, Brahimi holds French and Algerian nationalities.

== Career statistics ==
As of match played 16 October 2026

Appearances and goals by club, season and competition
Club	Season	League			Cup (Note: Includes Coupe de France, Danish Cup)		Other		Total	
Club	Season	Division	Apps	Goals	Apps	Goals	Apps	Goals	Apps	Goals
Troyes B	2017–18	National 3	3	0	0	0	—		3	0
Troyes B	2018–19	National 3	19	4	0	0	—		19	4
Troyes B	2019–20	National 3	14	4	0	0	—		14	4
Troyes B	Total		36	8	0	0	0	0	36	8
Le Havre B	2020–21	National 3	3	0	0	0	—		2	0
USL Dunkerque	2021–22	Ligue 2	36	3	1	0	—		37	3
Caen	2022–23	Ligue 2	36	3	2	0	—		38	3
Caen	2023–24	Ligue 2	30	2	3	0	—		33	2
Caen	2024–25	Ligue 2	30	3	3	3	—		33	6
Caen	2025–26	National	3	0	0	0	—		3	0
Caen	Total		99	8	8	3	0	0	107	11
Viborg	2025–26	Danish Superliga	16	2	4	2	—		20	4
Viborg	2026–27	Danish Superliga	5	0	0	0	—		5	0
Viborg	Total		21	2	4	2	0	0	25	4
Pau FC (loan)	2026–27	Ligue 2	3	1	0	0	—		3	1
Career total			198	22	13	5	0	0	212	27

== Honours ==
Troyes U19

- Coupe Gambardella: 2017–18
