= Lorenzo Rajot =

French footballer (born 1997)

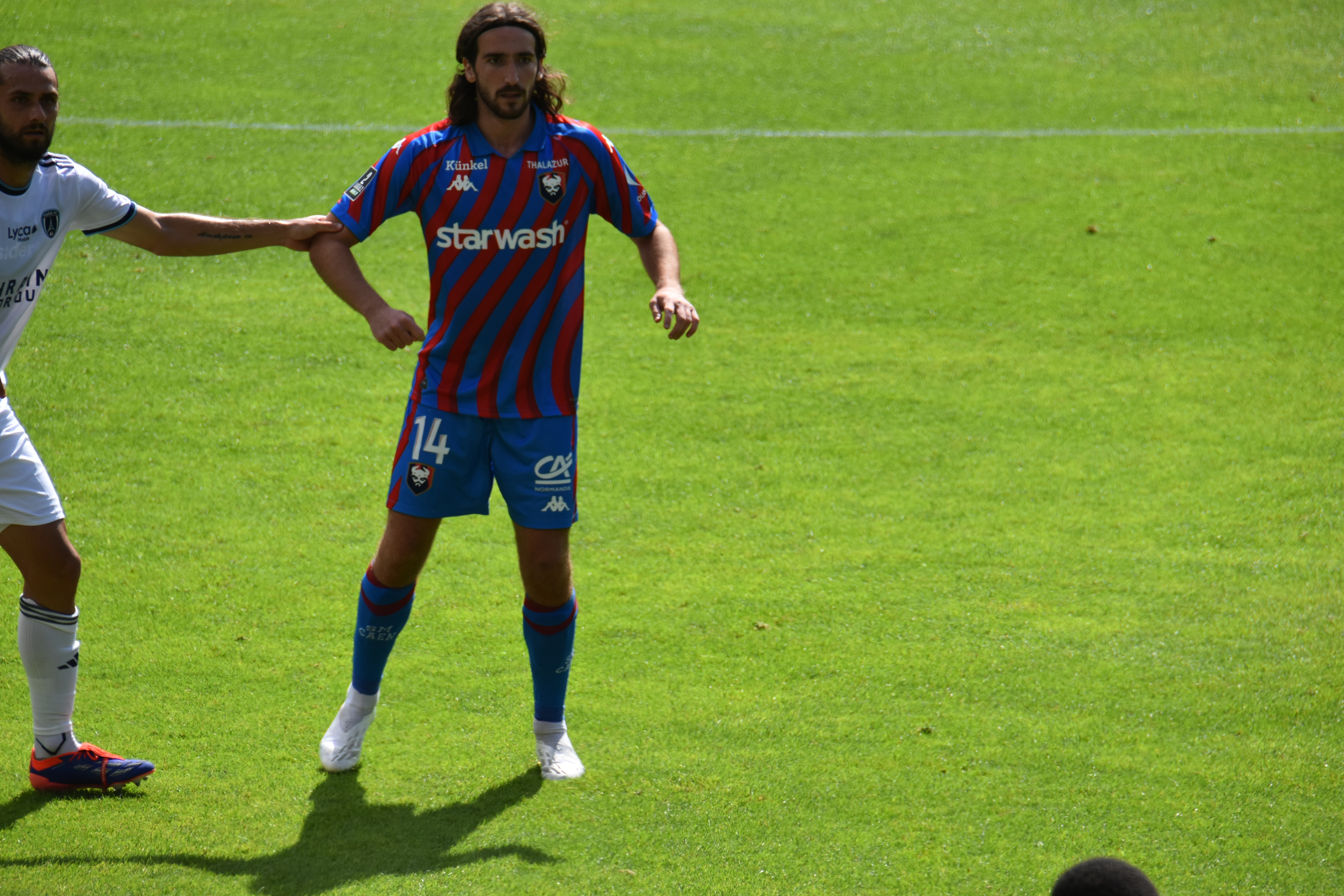
- Rajot playing for Caen in 2024.

Personal information
- Date of birth: 13 October 1997 (age 29)
- Place of birth: Saint-Cloud, France
- Height: 1.80 m (5 ft 11 in)
- Position: Midfielder

Team information
- Current team: Pau
- Number: 5

Youth career
- 2008–2011: Clermont

Senior career*
Years	Team	Apps	(Gls)
2015–2017	Clermont II	38	(7)
2017–2021	Clermont	48	(1)
2020	→ Le Mans (loan)	7	(0)
2021–2024	Rodez	101	(8)
2024–2026	Caen	57	(3)
2026–	Pau	5	(1)
- * Club domestic league appearances and goals as of 4 September 2026

Lorenzo Rajot (born 13 October 1997) is a French professional footballer who plays as a midfielder for Ligue 2 club Pau.

== Career ==
Rajot made his professional debut for Clermont Foot in a Ligue 2 1–0 win over Valenciennes FC on 19 May 2017.

Rajot joined another Ligue 2 club, Le Mans, in January 2020 on loan with an option to purchase.

On 4 June 2021, he moved to Rodez. On 12 August 2024, he signed a three years contract for Stade Malherbe Caen.
