= Daylam Meddah =

French footballer (born 2002)

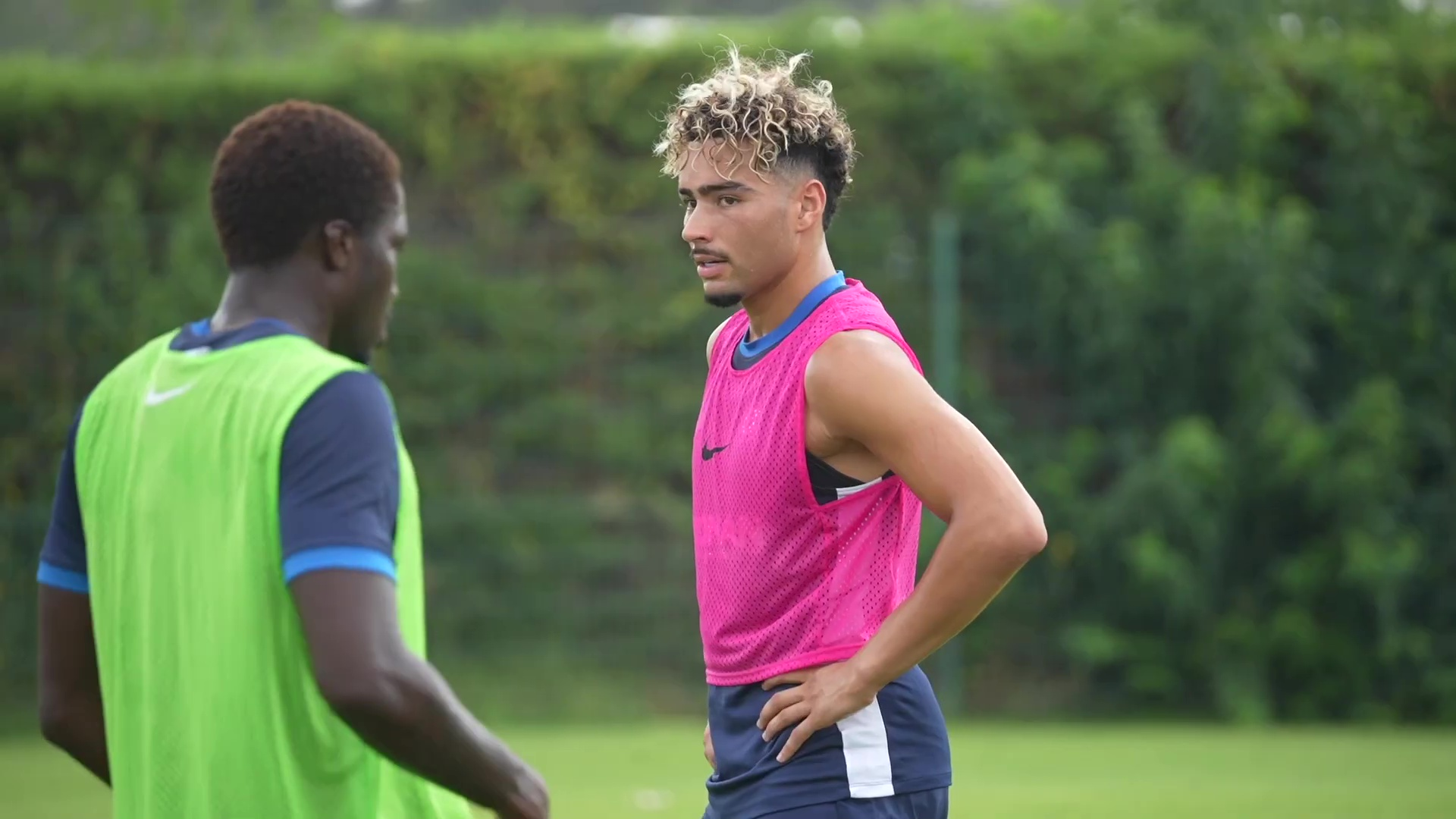

Personal information
- Date of birth: 6 October 2002 (age 24)
- Place of birth: Montivilliers, France
- Height: 1.87 m (6 ft 2 in)
- Positions: Centre-back; midfielder

Team information
- Current team: Montpellier
- Number: 27

Youth career
- ES Mont-Gaillard
- 2012–2019: Le Havre

Senior career*
Years	Team	Apps	(Gls)
2019–2022	Le Havre II	12	(0)
2022	Angers II	13	(1)
2022–2023	Sochaux	6	(0)
2022–2023	Sochaux II	4	(0)
2023–2025	Caen II	4	(0)
2023–2025	Caen	21	(1)
2025	→ Pau (loan)	7	(0)
2025	→ Pau II (loan)	1	(0)
2025–2026	Pau	25	(1)
2026–	Montpellier	0	(0)
- * Club domestic league appearances and goals as of 11 May 2026

Daylam Meddah (born 6 October 2002) is a French professional footballer who plays as a centre-back and midfielder for Ligue 2 club Montpellier.

== Career ==
Meddah is a youth product of the academies of ES Mont-Gaillard and Le Havre. On 20 July 2019, he signed his first professional contract with Le Havre, signing a 3-year contract. He began his career with the reserves of Le Havre. He briefly joined the reserves of Angers on 18 August 2021. He transferred to Sochaux on 16 June 2022, signing a 3-year contract. He made his professional debut with Sochaux in a 0– Ligue 2 tie with Paris FC on 1 August 2022, coming on in the 70th minute.

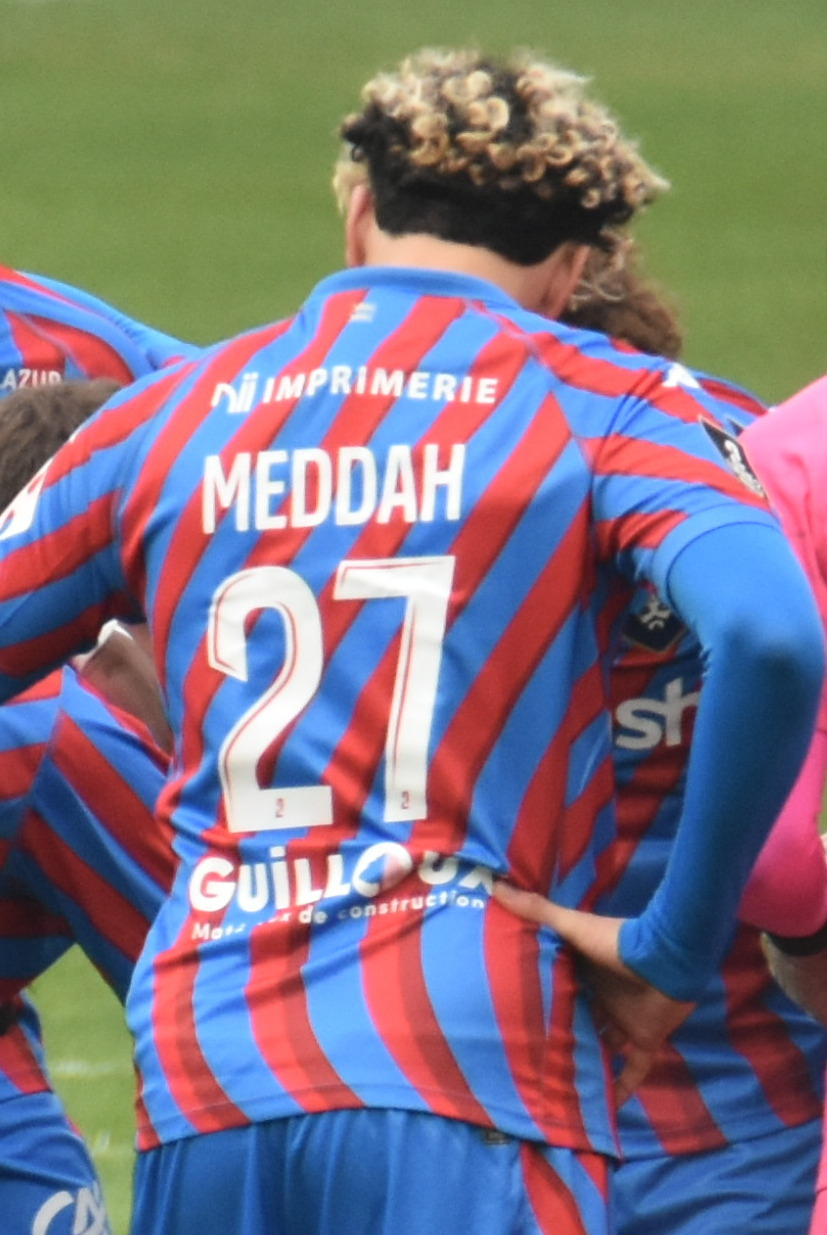

On 3 February 2025, Meddah was loaned to Pau.

On 13 July 2026, Meddah signed a four-year contract with Montpellier in Ligue 2.

== Personal life ==
Meddah was born in Montivilliers in Normandy, France. He holds French and Moroccan nationalities. He has Algerian descent.
