= Diabé Bolumbu =

French footballer (born 2004)

Personal information
- Full name: Diabé Ousmane Cothy Bolumbu Sombo
- Date of birth: 12 July 2004 (age 22)
- Place of birth: Antony, France
- Height: 1.80 m (5 ft 11 in)
- Position: Left-back

Team information
- Current team: Caen
- Number: 3

Youth career
- 2010–2014: Antony Sports
- 2014–2017: Paris Saint-Germain
- 2017–2018: Antony Sports
- 2018–2020: FC Gobelins
- 2020–2023: Caen

Senior career*
Years	Team	Apps	(Gls)
2021–	Caen B	50	(0)
2023–	Caen	31	(0)

International career
2022	France U18	5	(0)
2023	France U20	4	(0)
- * Club domestic league appearances and goals as of 23 June 2026

Diabé Ousmane Cothy Bolumbu Sombo (born 12 July 2004) is a French professional footballer who plays as a left-back for Ligue 3 club Caen.

== Club career ==
On 31 May 2022, Bolumbu signed an "elite" contract with Caen, tying him to the club until 2027. This deal meant that he would be under an academy contract for the following two years and under a professional contract the remaining three.

== International career ==
Bolumbu is a France youth international. He was a part of the under-18 squad that won the 2022 Mediterranean Games. On 31 August 2023, he received a call-up to the under-20s for two matches against Denmark.

== Personal life ==
Born in France, Bolumbu is of Senegalese descent through his father and Congolese descent through his mother.

== Honours ==
Caen U18

- Coupe Gambardella runner-up: 2021–22

France U18

- Mediterranean Games: 2022
