= Mickaël Le Bihan =

French footballer (born 1990)

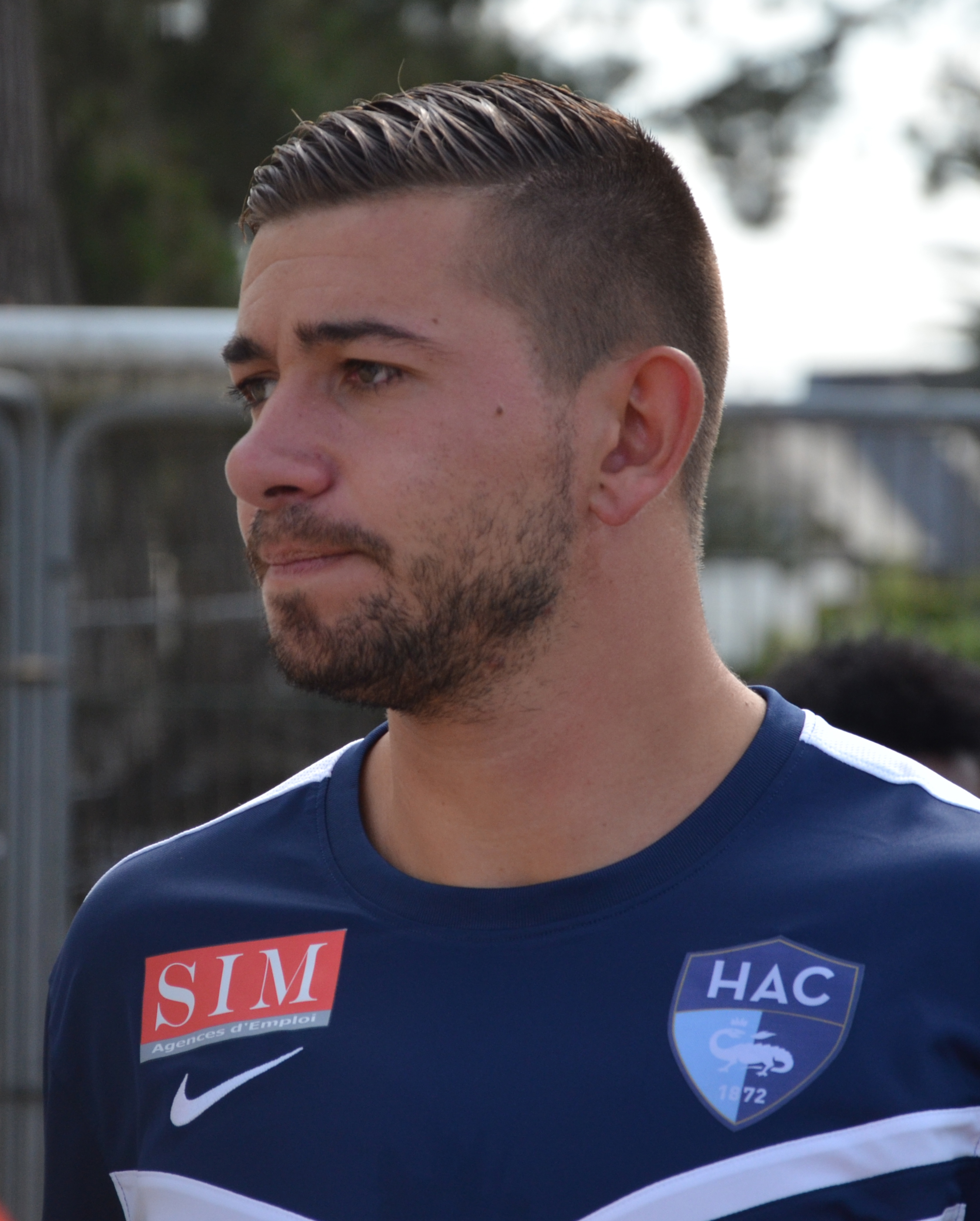
- Le Bihan with Le Havre in 2015

Personal information
- Date of birth: 16 May 1990 (age 36)
- Place of birth: Ploemeur, France
- Height: 1.84 m (6 ft 0 in)
- Position: Striker

Team information
- Current team: Fréjus Saint-Raphaël
- Number: 25

Senior career*
Years	Team	Apps	(Gls)
2009–2013	Sedan	62	(7)
2012	Sedan B	1	(1)
2013–2015	Le Havre	69	(26)
2015–2019	Nice B	13	(4)
2015–2019	Nice	27	(5)
2019–2021	Auxerre	54	(23)
2021–2023	Dijon	68	(19)
2021	Dijon B	1	(0)
2023–2025	Caen	58	(3)
2025–	Fréjus Saint-Raphaël	7	(1)
- * Club domestic league appearances and goals as of 4 October 2025

Mickaël Le Bihan (born 16 May 1990) is a French professional footballer who plays as a striker for Championnat National 1 club Fréjus Saint-Raphaël.

== Career ==
=== Le Havre ===
Playing for Le Havre, Le Bihan scored 18 goals during the 2014–15 Ligue 2 season, thereby becoming the league's top scorer.

=== Nice ===
On 2 September 2015, Le Bihan joined Ligue 1 team Nice for a reported transfer fee of €1.5 million. Just three weeks later, on 23 September 2015, he suffered a fractured tibia in a Ligue 1 match against Bordeaux. In January 2016, Nice announced that an operation would be necessary and that he would miss the rest of the season.

On 24 February 2017, he returned to the pitch after a 17-month injury lay-off, scoring a brace in a 30-minute, second-half substitute appearance in a Ligue 1 home match against Montpellier to help Nice come back from a 1–0 deficit to win 2–1.

On 24 May 2019, Le Bihan scored his first goal in over two years after again being plagued by injuries.

=== Caen ===
On 1 September 2023, Le Bihan signed for Ligue 2 club Caen on a two-year contract.
