= Emmanuel Ntim =

Ghanaian footballer

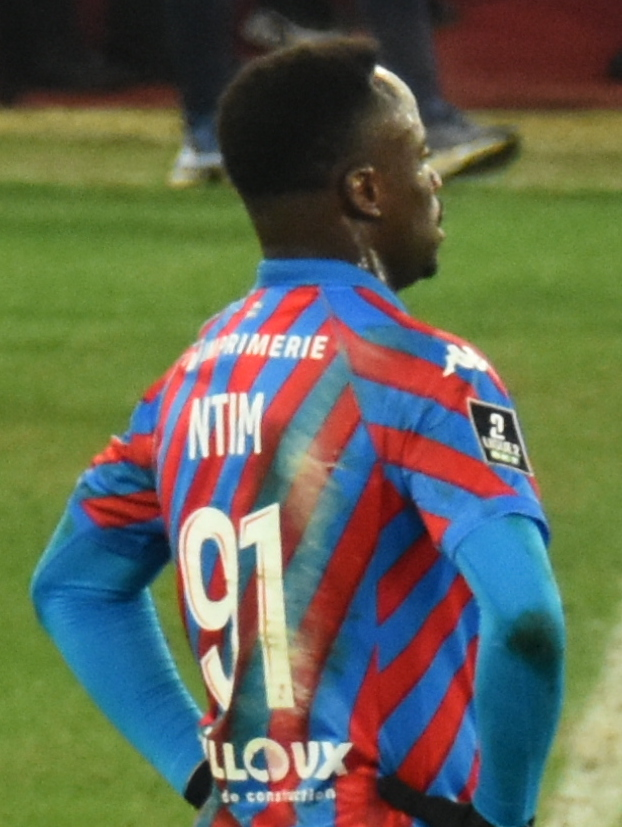
- Ntim with SM Caen in 2025

Personal information
- Date of birth: 12 March 1996 (age 30)
- Place of birth: Kumasi, Ghana
- Height: 1.79 m (5 ft 10 in)
- Position: Right-back

Youth career
- Right to Dream Academy

Senior career*
| Years | Team | Apps | (Gls) |
| 2014–2016 | Valenciennes B | 18 | (1) |
| 2015–2022 | Valenciennes | 116 | (5) |
| 2017–2018 | → Chambly B (loan) | 5 | (1) |
| 2017–2018 | → Chambly (loan) | 3 | (0) |
| 2019 | → Trélissac (loan) | 8 | (1) |
| 2022–2025 | Caen B | 5 | (1) |
| 2022–2025 | Caen | 43 | (2) |
| 2024 | → Troyes (loan) | 9 | (0) |
- * Club domestic league appearances and goals as of 13 May 2025

Emmanuel Ntim (born 12 March 1996) is a Ghanaian professional footballer who plays as a right-back.

== Career ==
In January 2019, he was loaned to Trélissac from Valenciennes until the end of the season.

On 22 June 2022, Ntim signed with Caen until 2025. On 1 February 2024, Ntim moved on loan to Troyes.
