= 2015–16 Stade de Reims season =

Reims
2015–16 season
- Chairman: Jean-Pierre Caillot
- Manager: Olivier Guégan
- Stadium: Stade Auguste Delaune
- Ligue 1: 18th (relegated)
- Coupe de France: Round of 64
- Coupe de la Ligue: Round of 32
- Top goalscorer: League: Nicolas de Préville (6); All: Nicolas de Préville (7)
- Highest home attendance: 20,950 vs Marseille (16 August 2015)
- Lowest home attendance: 9,289 vs Rennes (28 November 2015)
Home colours	Away colours	Third colours

The 2015–16 Stade de Reims season is the 85th professional season of the club since its creation in 1931.

== Players ==
French teams are limited to four players without EU citizenship. Hence, the squad list includes only the principal nationality of each player; several non-European players on the squad have dual citizenship with an EU country. Also, players from the ACP countries—countries in Africa, the Caribbean, and the Pacific that are signatories to the Cotonou Agreement—are not counted against non-EU quotas due to the Kolpak ruling.

=== Current squad ===
As of 2 February 2016.

Note: Flags indicate national team as defined under FIFA eligibility rules; some limited exceptions apply. Players may hold more than one non-FIFA nationality.

No.	Pos.	Nation	Player
1	GK	FRA	Johann Carrasso
2	DF	MLI	Mohamed Fofana
3	DF	FRA	Franck Signorino
4	MF	GEO	Jaba Kankava
5	DF	MAR	Abdelhamid El Kaoutari (on loan from Palermo)
6	MF	FRA	Antoine Devaux
7	FW	CPV	Odaïr Fortes
8	MF	CGO	Prince Oniangue
9	FW	CGO	Thievy Bifouma (on loan from Granada)
10	FW	FRA	Gaëtan Charbonnier
11	MF	BRA	Diego
12	FW	FRA	Nicolas de Préville
13	MF	GAM	Hassane Kamara
14	MF	GUI	Lass Bangoura (on loan from Rayo Vallecano)
15	DF	TUR	Atila Turan

No.	Pos.	Nation	Player
16	GK	TOG	Kossi Agassa
17	MF	FRA	Aly Ndom
18	MF	GAB	Frédéric Bulot
19	MF	FRA	Alexi Peuget
20	FW	USA	Theoson Siebatcheu
21	MF	FRA	Hugo Rodriguez
22	DF	GLP	Mickaël Tacalfred
23	DF	ALG	Aïssa Mandi (captain)
24	FW	FRA	David Ngog
25	DF	FRA	Anthony Weber
26	MF	COD	Omenuke Mfulu
27	DF	MLI	Hamari Traoré
28	DF	FRA	Antoine Conte
29	FW	FRA	Grejohn Kyei
30	GK	HAI	Johny Placide

=== Out on loan ===
Note: Flags indicate national team as defined under FIFA eligibility rules; some limited exceptions apply. Players may hold more than one non-FIFA nationality.

No.	Pos.	Nation	Player
—	DF	MTQ	Christopher Glombard (on loan to Paris FC)

== Transfers ==
=== Transfers in ===
Date	Pos.	Player	Age	Moved from	Fee	Notes
13 July 2015	MF	(Gabon) Frédéric Bulot	24	(Belgium) Standard Liège	Undisclosed	
17 July 2015	DF	(Mali) Hamari Traoré	23	(Belgium) Lierse	Undisclosed	
16 August 2015	MF	(Georgia (country)) Jaba Kankava	29	(Ukraine) Dnipro	Undisclosed	
17 August 2015	MF	(France) Hugo Rodriguez	24	(France) Arles-Avignon	Undisclosed	
27 August 2015	MF	(The Gambia) Hassane Kamara	21	(France) Châteauroux	Undisclosed	
1 February 2016	GK	(France) Johann Carrasso	27	(France) Metz	Undisclosed	

=== Loans in ===
Date	Pos.	Player	Age	Loaned from	Return date	Notes
28 January 2016	FW	(France) Thievy Bifouma	23	(Spain) Espanyol	30 June 2016	
1 February 2016	DF	(France) Abdelhamid El Kaoutari	25	(Italy) Palermo	30 June 2016	
1 February 2016	FW	(Guinea) Lass Bangoura	23	(Spain) Rayo Vallecano	30 June 2016	

=== Transfers out ===
Date	Pos.	Player	Age	Moved to	Fee	Notes
1 July 2015	FW	(France) Gaëtan Courtet	26	(France) Auxerre	Undisclosed	
1 July 2015	GK	(France) Sacha Bastien	20	Unattached	Released	
8 July 2015	FW	(France) Yann Benedick	23	(France) US Sarre-Union	Free Transfer	
31 July 2015	MF	(Cameroon) André-Frank Zambo	19	(France) Marseille	Free Transfer	
5 August 2015	FW	(Cameroon) Benjamin Moukandjo	26	(France) Lorient	Undisclosed	
11 August 2015	MF	(Denmark) Mads Albæk	25	(Sweden) IFK Göteborg	Undisclosed	
25 January 2016	DF	(France) Grégory Bourillon	31	(France) Angers	Undisclosed	

=== Loans out ===
Date	Pos.	Player	Age	Loaned to	Return date	Notes
1 July 2015	DF	(Martinique) Christopher Glombard	26	(France) Paris FC	30 June 2016	

== Competitions ==
=== Ligue 1 ===
==== League table ====
Pos	Team	Pld	W	D	L	GF	GA	GD	Pts	Qualification or relegation
16	Guingamp	38	11	11	16	47	56	−9	44	
17	Toulouse	38	9	13	16	45	55	−10	40	
18	Reims (R)	38	10	9	19	44	57	−13	39	Relegation to Ligue 2 (Note: Starting this season, Ligue 1 decided to reduce the number of relegation spots from three to two. However, the decision was appealed and overturned so three teams were relegated.)
19	Gazélec Ajaccio (R)	38	8	13	17	37	58	−21	37	Relegation to Ligue 2
20	Troyes (R)	38	3	9	26	28	83	−55	18	Relegation to Ligue 2

Source: Ligue 1, Soccerway
Rules for classification: 1) Points; 2) Goal difference; 3) Goals scored; 4) Head-to-head points; 5) Head-to-head goal difference; 6) Fairplay ranking.
(R) Relegated

==== Results summary ====
Overall								Home						Away					
Pld	W	D	L	GF	GA	GD	Pts	W	D	L	GF	GA	GD	W	D	L	GF	GA	GD
38	10	9	19	44	57	−13	39	7	5	7	28	23	+5	3	4	12	16	34	−18

Last updated: 14 May 2016.
Source: Competitive matches

==== Results by round ====
Round	1	2	3	4	5	6	7	8	9	10	11	12	13	14	15	16	17	18	19	20	21	22	23	24	25	26	27	28	29	30	31	32	33	34	35	36	37	38
Ground	A	H	A	H	A	H	A	H	A	H	H	A	H	A	H	A	H	H	A	H	A	H	A	H	A	H	A	H	A	A	H	A	H	A	A	H	A	H
Result	W	W	L	W	D	D	D	W	L	L	L	L	L	L	D	W	D	D	L	L	D	D	L	W	W	L	L	W	L	D	L	L	W	L	L	L	L	W
Position	3	2	7	2	3	5	5	4	7	9	11	13	14	15	15	12	14	15	17	17	17	17	18	16	16	17	17	17	16	17	17	17	17	17	18	18	19	18

Source: Ligue1
A = Away; H = Home; W = Win; D = Draw; L = Loss

==== Matches ====
Win Draw Loss

9 August 2015 1	Bordeaux	1–2	Reims	Bordeaux
17:00 CEST (UTC+02:00)	Guilbert (yellow card) 37'; Khazri 41'; Poundjé (yellow card) 62'; Yamberé (yellow card) 88'	Report	Traoré (yellow card) 18' de Préville 80'; Charbonnier (yellow card) 84'; Siebatcheu 87'	Stadium: Nouveau Stade de Bordeaux; Attendance: 31,583; Referee: Ruddy Buquet

16 August 2015 2	Reims	1–0	Marseille	Reims
14:00 CEST (UTC+02:00)	Traore 14', (yellow card) 41'; Peuget (yellow card) 44'	Report	Mendy (yellow card) 28'; Romao (yellow card) 49' (yellow-red card) 74'; Batshuayi (yellow card) 58'	Stadium: Stade Auguste Delaune; Attendance: 20,950; Referee: Benoît Bastien

22 August 2015 3	Nantes	1–0	Reims	Nantes
20:00 CEST (UTC+02:00)	Sigþórsson (yellow card) 13'; Lenjani 77'	Report	Kankava (yellow card) 40'; Weber (yellow card) 57'; Mfulu (yellow card) 65'	Stadium: Stade de la Beaujoire; Attendance: 23,854; Referee: Hakim Ben El Hadj

29 August 2015 4	Reims	4–1	Lorient	Reims
20:00 CEST (UTC+02:00)	Charbonnier 23'; Signorino (yellow card) 51' de Préville 54'; Turan (yellow card) 57', (goal) 85'; Kyei 66'; Siebatcheu (yellow card) 78'	Report	Moukandjo (yellow card) 44'; Bouanga 48'	Stadium: Stade Auguste Delaune; Attendance: 11,041; Referee: Johan Hamel

12 September 2015 5	Toulouse	2–2	Reims	Toulouse
20:00 CEST (UTC+02:00)	Trejo (yellow card) 20'; Kana-Biyik 28'; Braithwaite 30'; Akpa Akpro (yellow card) 71'	Report	Siebatcheu 56'; Oniangue (yellow card) 68'; Bulot 80'; Devaux (yellow card) 90+4'	Stadium: Stadium Municipal; Attendance: 11,766; Referee: Fredy Fautrel

19 September 2015 6	Reims	1–1	Paris Saint-Germain	Reims
17:30 CEST (UTC+02:00)	Kankava (yellow card) 4'; Kyei (yellow card) 74'; Siebatcheu 83'	Report	Stambouli (yellow card) 67'; Matuidi (yellow card) 80'; Cavani 84'	Stadium: Stade Auguste Delaune; Attendance: 20,526; Referee: Bartolomeu Varela

22 September 2015 7	Angers	0–0	Reims	Angers
19:00 CEST (UTC+02:00)	Saïss (yellow card) 6'	Report	Charbonnier (yellow card) 12'; Traore (yellow card) 51'; Kankava (yellow card) 71'	Stadium: Stade Jean-Bouin; Attendance: 11,163; Referee: Tony Chapron

25 September 2015 8	Reims	1–0	Lille	Reims
20:30 CEST (UTC+02:00)	Weber (yellow card) 12'; Bulot (yellow card) 15'; Kankava (yellow card) 31'; Ngog 56'	Report	Sidibé (yellow card) 19'; Bauthéac (yellow card) 33'; Mavuba (yellow card) 39'	Stadium: Stade Auguste Delaune; Attendance: 11,696; Referee: Ruddy Buquet

3 October 2015 9	Lyon	1–0	Reims	Lyon
17:30 CEST (UTC+02:00)	Lacazette 44', (yellow card) 56'; Ghezzal (yellow card) 88'	Report	Signorino (yellow card) 84'; Oniangue (yellow card) 85'	Stadium: Stade de Gerland; Attendance: 30,089; Referee: Antony Gautier

17 October 2015 10	Reims	0–1	Caen	Reims
20:00 CEST (UTC+02:00)	Kyei (yellow card) 13'; Mfulu (yellow card) 19'	Report	Leborgne (yellow card) 24'; Appiah (yellow card) 52'; Yahia (yellow card) 67'; Féret 74'	Stadium: Stade Auguste Delaune; Attendance: 10,555; Referee: Wilfried Bien

25 October 2015 11	Reims	0–1	Monaco	Reims
14:00 CET (UTC+01:00)	Devaux (yellow card) 62' (yellow-red card) 69'; Charbonnier (yellow card) 67'	Report	Silva 11'; Subašić (yellow card) 90'; Cavaleiro (yellow card) 90+1'	Stadium: Stade Auguste Delaune; Attendance: 14,238; Referee: Frank Schneider

31 October 2015 12	Saint-Étienne	3–0	Reims	Saint Étienne
17:00 CET (UTC+01:00)	Eysseric (yellow card) 9' (goal) 83'; Berić 63'; Oniangué 68' (o.g.)	Report	Peuget (yellow card) 67'	Stadium: Stade Geoffroy-Guichard; Attendance: 28,825; Referee: Mikael Lesage

7 November 2015 13	Reims	1–2	Gazélec Ajaccio	Reims
20:00 CET (UTC+01:00)	Weber (yellow card) 66'; Kyei 77'; De Préville (yellow card) 82'; Devaux (yellow card) 90'	Report	Ducourtioux (yellow card) 31'; Boutaïb 34'; Zoua 71'; Sylla (yellow card) 81'	Stadium: Stade Auguste Delaune; Attendance: 11,393; Referee: Saïd Ennjimi

21 November 2015 14	Montpellier	2–1	Reims	Montpellier
20:00 CET (UTC+01:00)	Yatabaré 21'; Dabo (yellow card) 23' (goal) 84'; Roussillon (yellow card) 49'; Camara 69'; Bensebaini (yellow card) 77'	Report	Weber 12'; Signorino (yellow card) 26'; Mfulu (yellow card) 36'	Stadium: Stade de la Mosson; Attendance: 9,544; Referee: Stephane Jochem

28 November 2015 15	Reims	2–2	Rennes	Reims
20:00 CET (UTC+01:00)	de Préville (yellow card) 30' (goal) 67'; Kankava (yellow card) 35' (yellow-red card) 64'; Mandi 58'; Signorino (yellow card) 65'; Devaux (yellow card) 88'	Report	Boga 44'; Sylla (yellow card) 27'; Moreira (yellow card) 61'; Sio (yellow card) 66'; Grosicki 81'; Gelson Fernandes (yellow card) 84'	Stadium: Stade Auguste Delaune; Attendance: 9,289; Referee: Hakim Ben El Hadj

2 December 2015 16	Guingamp	1–2	Reims	Guingamp
19:00 CET (UTC+01:00)	Salibur 45+3', (yellow card) 42' (yellow-red card); Sorbon (yellow card) 76'; Coco (yellow card) 84'	report	Ngog 14', 54', (yellow card) 40'; Traore (yellow card) 16' (yellow-red card) 90'; Weber (yellow card) 40'; Peuget (yellow card) 45+2'; Fofana (yellow card) 53'	Stadium: Stade du Roudourou; Attendance: 14,046; Referee: Johan Hamel

5 December 2015 17	Reims	1–1	Troyes	Reims
20:00 CET (UTC+01:00)	Kankava (yellow card) 20' de Préville 36'	Report	Thiago Xavier (yellow card) 35'; Pi 47'	Stadium: Stade Auguste Delaune; Attendance: 10,765; Referee: Jérôme Miguelgorry

12 December 2015 18	Reims	1–1	Nice	Reims
16:00 CET (UTC+01:00)	Rigonato 78'; Devaux (yellow card) 84'; Kankava (yellow card) 90+3'; Mandi (red card) 90+4'	Report	Germain 6'; Pied (yellow card) 30'; Ben Arfa (yellow card) 57'	Stadium: Stade Auguste Delaune; Attendance: 12,536; Referee: Antony Gautier

19 December 2015 19	Bastia	2–0	Reims	Furiani
20:00 CET (UTC+01:00)	Ayité 21'; Cabot 59'; Martins Pereira (yellow card) 63'	Report	Tacalfred (yellow card) 71'	Stadium: Stade Armand Cesari; Attendance: 10,528; Referee: Saïd Ennjimi

9 January 2016 20	Reims	1–3	Toulouse	Reims
20:00 CET (UTC+01:00)	Devaux 12', (red card) 79'; Mandi (yellow card) 27'; Traoré (yellow card) 46'	Report	Akpa Akpro (yellow card) 29'; Blin (yellow card) 40'; Tisserand (yellow card) 44'; Ben Yedder 51', 66', 89'; Trejo (yellow card) 59'	Stadium: Stade Auguste Delaune; Attendance: 13,192; Referee: Mikaël Lesage

16 January 2016 21	Gazélec Ajaccio	2–2	Reims	Ajaccio, Corsica
20:00 CET (UTC+01:00)	Boutaïb 2'; Đoković 72', (yellow card) 83'; Tshibumbu (yellow card) 73'	Report	De Préville 22', 31'	Stadium: Stade Ange Casanova; Attendance: 3,568; Referee: Johan Hamel

24 January 2016 22	Reims	1–1	Saint-Étienne	Reims
17:00 CET (UTC+01:00)	Tacalfred (yellow card) 15'; Diego (yellow card) 77'; Mandi 89'	Report	Théophile-Catherine (yellow card) 48'; Bahebeck 60'; Pogba (yellow card) 64'	Stadium: Stade Auguste Delaune; Attendance: 13,048; Referee: Ruddy Buquet

30 January 2016 23	Lorient	2–0	Reims	Lorient
20:00 CET (UTC+01:00)	Abdullah (yellow card) 4'; Touré 15', 51'; Jouffre (yellow card) 45+1'; Mulumba (yellow card) 82'	Report	Kankava (yellow card) 19'; Traoré (yellow card) 30'	Stadium: Stade du Moustoir; Attendance: 10,002; Referee: Jerome Miguelgorry

3 February 2016 24	Reims	2–1	Angers	Reims
19:00 CET (UTC+01:00)	Traoré 43'; Charbonnier 50'	Report	Bouka Moutou 15'; Saïss (yellow card) 49'; Sunu (yellow card) 72'; Andreu (yellow card) 80'; Capelle (red card) 90+1'	Stadium: Stade Auguste Delaune; Attendance: 10,603; Referee: Antony Gautier

6 February 2016 25	Caen	0–2	Reims	Caen
20:00 CET (UTC+01:00)	Da Silva (yellow card) 21'; Kouakou (yellow card) 49'; Adéoti (yellow card) 62'	Report	Bifouma 20'; Kankava (yellow card) 52'; Traoré (yellow card) 59'; Oniangue 63'	Stadium: Stade Michel d'Ornano; Attendance: 16,018; Referee: Bartolomeu Varela

13 February 2016 26	Reims	0–1	Bastia	Reims
20:00 CET (UTC+1)	Traoré (yellow card) 24'; Oniangue (yellow card) 54'; Bangoura (yellow card) 63'; Bifouma (yellow card) 88'; Rigonato (yellow card) 90'	Report	Cahuzac (yellow card) 26'; Mostefa (yellow card) 38'; Palmieri (yellow card) 45'; Traoré 48' (o.g.)	Stadium: Stade Auguste Delaune; Attendance: 11,335; Referee: Lionel Jaffredo

20 February 2016 27	Paris Saint-Germain	4–1	Reims	Paris
17:00 CET (UTC+01:00)	Van der Wiel 12', (yellow card) 33'; Ibrahimović 43', 68'; Cavani 45+1', (yellow card) 81'	Report	Oniangue 34'	Stadium: Parc des Princes; Attendance: 45,489; Referee: Jérôme Miguelgorry

27 February 2016 28	Reims	4–1	Bordeaux	Reims
20:00 CET (UTC+01:00)	Mandi 23'; Bifouma 34'; Devaux (yellow card) 37'; Conte (yellow card) 50'; Charbonnier (yellow card) 67'; Bangoura 89'	Report	Ounas (yellow card) 30' (goal) 69'; Chantôme (yellow card) 64'	Stadium: Stade Auguste Delaune; Attendance: 11,286; Referee: François Letexier

5 March 2016 29	Lille	2–0	Reims	Villeneuve-d'Ascq
20:00 CET (UTC+1)	Rony Lopes (yellow card) 42' (goal) 63'; Sidibé (yellow card) 42'; Éder 90+3'	Report	Diego Rigonato (yellow card) 6' de Préville (yellow card) 71'; Devaux (yellow card) 74' (yellow-red card) 85'	Stadium: Stade Pierre-Mauroy; Attendance: 27,904; Referee: Mikael Lesage

11 March 2016 30	Monaco	2–2	Reims	Fontvieille
20:30 CET (UTC+1)	Love 5', 38'; Echiéjilé (yellow card) 36'; Silva (yellow card) 73'	Report	Carrasso (yellow card) 5'; Charbonnier 11'; Conte (yellow card) 70'; Rigonato 79'	Stadium: Stade Louis II; Attendance: 5,738; Referee: Benoît Millot

19 March 2016 31	Reims	0–1	Guingamp	Reims
20:00 CET (UTC+1)	Conte (yellow card) 28'; Kankava (yellow card) 41'; Traoré (yellow card) 44'; Mandi (yellow card) 75'	Report	Sankharé 26'; Jacobsen (yellow card) 40'; Coc (yellow card) 56'	Stadium: Stade Auguste Delaune; Attendance: 14,433; Referee: Frank Schneider

2 April 2016 32	Rennes	3–1	Reims	Rennes
20:00 CET (UTC+1)	Grosicki 12'; Dembélé 15', 67'; Diagné (yellow card) 61'	Report	Mandi 59'	Stadium: Roazhon Park; Attendance: 24,828; Referee: Saïd Ennjimi

9 April 2016 33	Reims	2–1	Nantes	Reims
20:00 CET (UTC+1)	Kankava (yellow card) 6'; Oniangue 11'; Signorino (yellow card) 74'; Sabaly 80' (o.g.)	Report	Bammou (yellow card) 30', (red card) 85'; Audel (yellow card) 59', (goal) 68'; Cana (yellow card) 79'	Stadium: Stade Auguste Delaune; Attendance: 12,143; Referee: Bartolomeu Varela

16 April 2016 34	Troyes	2–1	Reims	Troyes
20:00 CET (UTC+1)	Camus 50'; Nivet 60' (pen.); Thiago Xavier (yellow card) 65'; Saunier (yellow card) 87'	Report	Conte (yellow card) 30'; Carrasso (yellow card) 60'; Bifouma 64', (yellow card) 87'	Stadium: Stade de l'Aube; Attendance: 12,650; Referee: Tony Chapron

22 April 2016 35	Nice	2–0	Reims	Nice
20:30 CET (UTC+01:00)	Germain 11'; Ben Arfa 56' (pen.); Pied (yellow card) 85'	Report	Weber (yellow card) 55'; Turan (yellow card) 58'; Traoré (yellow card) 74'	Stadium: Allianz Riviera; Referee: Benoît Bastien

30 April 2016 36	Reims	2–3	Montpellier	Reims
19:00 CET (UTC+1)	De Préville (yellow card) 52'; Diego (yellow card) 54'; Oniangue 83'; Bifouma 90+2'	Report	Camara 38'; Roussillon (yellow card) 83'; Congré 84'; Sanson 86'	Stadium: Stade Auguste Delaune; Attendance: 19,716; Referee: Fredy Fautrel

7 May 2016 37	Marseille	1–0	Reims	Marseille
21:00 CET (UTC+1)	Batshuayi 56'; Barrada (yellow card) 68'; Mandanda (yellow card) 88'	Report	Devaux (yellow card) 71'	Stadium: Stade Vélodrome; Attendance: 20,767; Referee: Nicolas Rainville

14 May 2016 38	Reims	4-1	Lyon	Reims
21:00 CET (UTC+1)	Mandi 14', (yellow card) 41'; Kyei (yellow card) 27', (goal) 56' (pen.); Diego 34'; Fofana (yellow card) 43'; Turan 51', (yellow card) 85'; Kankava (yellow card) 53'	Report	Gonalons (yellow card) 25'; Umtiti (yellow card) 55'; Cornet 63'	Stadium: Stade Auguste Delaune; Attendance: 17,432; Referee: Amaury Delerue

=== Coupe de la Ligue ===
28 October 2015 Round of 32	Dijon	2–1	Stade de Reims	Dijon
20:00 CET (UTC+01:00)	Diony 17' (yellow card) 48'; Bela 39'; Paulle (yellow card) 50'; Maury (yellow card) 58'	Report	Charbonnier 19'; Peuget (yellow card) 51' de Préville (yellow card) 72'	Stadium: Stade Gaston Gérard; Attendance: 4,849; Referee: Lionel Jaffredo

=== Coupe de France ===
2 January 2016 Round of 64	Chambly	4–1	Stade de Reims	Chambly
18:00 CET (UTC+01:00)	Louisy-Daniel 6', 9', 43'; Touati 48'	Report	Traoré (yellow card) 72'; Peuget (yellow card) 76' de Préville 89' (pen.)	Stadium: Stade des Marais; Attendance: 2,400; Referee: Benoît Millot
