= 2014–15 Stade de Reims season =

Reims
2014–15 season
- Chairman: Jean-Pierre Caillot
- Manager: Jean-Luc Vasseur (Until 8 April); Olivier Guégan (From 8 April)
- Stadium: Stade Auguste Delaune
- Ligue 1: 15th
- Coupe de France: Round of 32 vs. Rennes
- Coupe de la Ligue: Round of 32 vs. Arles-Avignon
- Top goalscorer: Benjamin Moukandjo (8)
- Highest home attendance: 19,270 vs Lyon (25 April 2015)
- Lowest home attendance: 7,336 vs Arles-Avignon (28 October 2014)
- Average home league attendance: 14,091
Home colours	Away colours	Third colours

The 2014–15 Stade de Reims season is the 84th professional season of the club since its creation in 1931.

== Players ==
=== First team squad ===
French teams are limited to four players without EU citizenship. Hence, the squad list includes only the principal nationality of each player; several non-European players on the squad have dual citizenship with an EU country. Also, players from the ACP countries—countries in Africa, the Caribbean, and the Pacific that are signatories to the Cotonou Agreement—are not counted against non-EU quotas due to the Kolpak ruling.

Note: Flags indicate national team as defined under FIFA eligibility rules; some limited exceptions apply. Players may hold more than one non-FIFA nationality.

No.	Pos.	Nation	Player
1	GK	FRA	Sacha Bastien
2	DF	MLI	Mohamed Fofana
3	DF	FRA	Franck Signorino
4	DF	FRA	Valentin Roberge (on loan from Sunderland)
5	DF	FRA	Grégory Bourillon
6	MF	FRA	Antoine Devaux
7	FW	CPV	Odaïr Fortes
8	MF	CGO	Prince Oniangue
10	FW	FRA	Gaëtan Charbonnier
11	FW	BRA	Diego
12	FW	FRA	Nicolas de Préville
14	FW	CMR	Benjamin Moukandjo
15	DF	COD	Chris Mavinga (on loan from Rubin Kazan)

No.	Pos.	Nation	Player
16	GK	TOG	Kossi Agassa
17	MF	DEN	Mads Albæk
19	MF	FRA	Alexi Peuget
20	MF	FRA	Yann Benedick
22	DF	GLP	Mickaël Tacalfred (captain)
23	DF	ALG	Aïssa Mandi
24	FW	FRA	David Ngog
25	DF	FRA	Anthony Weber
26	MF	FRA	Omenuke Mfulu
27	DF	MTQ	Christopher Glombard
28	DF	FRA	Antoine Conte
29	FW	FRA	Grejohn Kyei
30	GK	HAI	Johny Placide

==== Out on loan ====
Note: Flags indicate national team as defined under FIFA eligibility rules; some limited exceptions apply. Players may hold more than one non-FIFA nationality.

No.	Pos.	Nation	Player
18	FW	FRA	Gaëtan Courtet (at Brest)
20	DF	TUR	Atila Turan (at Kasımpaşa)

== Competitions ==
=== Ligue 1 ===
==== League table ====
Pos	Team	Pld	W	D	L	GF	GA	GD	Pts
13	Caen	38	12	10	16	54	55	−1	46
14	Nantes	38	11	12	15	29	40	−11	45
15	Reims	38	12	8	18	47	66	−19	44
16	Lorient	38	12	7	19	44	50	−6	43
17	Toulouse	38	12	6	20	43	64	−21	42

Source: Ligue 1
Rules for classification: 1) points; 2) goal difference; 3) number of goals scored

==== Results summary ====
Overall								Home						Away					
Pld	W	D	L	GF	GA	GD	Pts	W	D	L	GF	GA	GD	W	D	L	GF	GA	GD
38	12	8	18	47	66	−19	44	8	3	8	24	29	−5	4	5	10	23	37	−14

Last updated: 11 June 2015.
Source: Competitive matches

==== Results by round ====
Round	1	2	3	4	5	6	7	8	9	10	11	12	13	14	15	16	17	18	19	20	21	22	23	24	25	26	27	28	29	30	31	32	33	34	35	36	37	38
Ground	H	A	H	A	H	A	H	A	H	A	H	A	H	A	H	A	H	H	A	H	A	H	A	H	A	H	A	H	A	H	A	H	A	H	A	A	H	A
Result	D	L	L	L	W	W	L	L	W	D	W	D	W	D	W	L	L	W	W	L	L	D	L	L	D	D	D	W	L	L	L	L	W	L	L	W	W	L
Position	10	16	19	19	18	15	18	19	16	14	14	13	10	11	8	9	10	10	9	10	11	11	12	13	14	15	15	12	13	15	16	17	14	17	17	17	14	15

Source: Ligue1
A = Away; H = Home; W = Win; D = Draw; L = Loss

==== Matches ====
Win Draw Loss

8 August 2014 1	Reims	2–2	Paris Saint-Germain	Reims
20:30 CEST (UTC+02:00)	Oniangue 22'; Devaux 34'	Report	Ibrahimović 7', 63'; Verratti (yellow card) 73'; Bahebeck (yellow card) 88'	Stadium: Stade Auguste Delaune; Attendance: 18,540; Referee: Stéphane Lannoy

17 August 2014 2	Saint-Étienne	3–1	Reims	Saint-Étienne
17:00 CEST (UTC+02:00)	Gradel 60'; Bayal Sall (yellow card) 65'; Monnet-Paquet 70'; Erdinç 81'; Brison (yellow card) 83'	Report	Perrin 27' (o.g.); Devaux (yellow card) 35'; Bourillon (yellow card) 59'	Stadium: Stade Geoffroy-Guichard; Attendance: 33,810; Referee: Antony Gautier

23 August 2014 3	Reims	0–2	Caen	Reims
20:00 CEST (UTC+02:00)	Charbonnier (yellow card) 63'	Report	Kanté 83'; Bazile 90+1'	Stadium: Stade Auguste Delaune; Attendance: 12,015; Referee: Wilfried Bien

30 August 2014 4	Lens	4–2	Reims	Amiens
20:00 CEST (UTC+02:00)	Cyprien (yellow card) 27', (goal) 45'; Chavarria 47', (yellow card) 82'; Touzghar 61' (pen.); Coulibaly 87' (pen.)	Report	Mandi 7', (yellow card) 18'; Oniangue (red card) 23'; Signorino (yellow card) 60'; Courtet 80'	Stadium: Stade de la Licorne; Attendance: 9,846; Referee: Benoît Bastien

13 September 2014 5	Reims	2–0	Toulouse	Reims
20:00 CEST (UTC+02:00)	Ngog 13'; Courtet 86'	Report		Stadium: Stade Auguste Delaune; Attendance: 11,019; Referee: Alexandre Castro

20 September 2014 6	Lorient	0–1	Reims	Lorient
20:00 CEST (UTC+02:00)	Sunu (yellow card) 37'	Report	Moukandjo 72'; Placide (yellow card) 86'; Courtet (yellow card) 90+2'	Stadium: Stade du Moustoir; Attendance: 12,003; Referee: Benoît Millot

23 September 2014 7	Reims	0–5	Marseille	Reims
19:00 CEST (UTC+02:00)	Mavinga (yellow card) 7'	Report	Gignac 8', 20'; Morel (yellow card) 11'; Ayew 52', 59'; Imbula 74'	Stadium: Stade Auguste Delaune; Attendance: 17,705; Referee: Antony Gautier

27 September 2014 8	Metz	3–0	Reims	Metz
20:00 CEST (UTC+02:00)	Falcón 50', 90+2'; Kashi 70'	Report	Mavinga (yellow card) 57' (yellow-red card) 65'; Conte (yellow card) 75'; Albæk (red card) 87'	Stadium: Stade Saint-Symphorien; Attendance: 18,273; Referee: Olivier Thual

3 October 2014 9	Reims	1–0	Bordeaux	Reims
20:30 CEST (UTC+02:00)	Faubert 32' (o.g.); Signorino (yellow card) 37'; Charbonnier (yellow card) 55'	Report	Touré (yellow card) 83'; Khazri (yellow card) 90+3'	Stadium: Stade Auguste Delaune; Attendance: 14,546; Referee: Frank Schneider

18 October 2014 10	Nantes	1–1	Reims	Nantes
20:00 CEST (UTC+02:00)	Audel 13'; Veigneau (yellow card) 84'; Djilobodji (yellow card) 90+2'	Report	Oniangue (yellow card) 28'; Diego (yellow card) 43', (goal) 58'; Signorino (yellow card) 45+1'; Fofana (yellow card) 51'	Stadium: Stade de la Beaujoire; Attendance: 22,908; Referee: Sébastien Moreira

25 October 2014 11	Reims	1–0	Montpellier	Reims
20:00 CEST (UTC+02:00)	Devaux (yellow card) 26'; Conte (yellow card) 54'; Moukandjo 90', (yellow card) 90+1'	Report		Stadium: Stade Auguste Delaune; Attendance: 11,331; Referee: Benoît Millot

31 October 2014 12	Monaco	1–1	Reims	Monaco
20:30 CET (UTC+01:00)	Elderson 22'; Kondogbia (yellow card) 70'	Report	Charbonnier (yellow card) 61'; Fofana (yellow card) 76'; Moukandjo 80'	Stadium: Stade Louis II; Attendance: 5,488; Referee: Sébastien Desiage

9 November 2014 13	Reims	2–0	Lille	Reims
17:00 CET (UTC+01:00)	Moukandjo 26' (pen.); Mandi 33'; Charbonnier (yellow card) 56' de Préville (yellow card) 65'	Report	Béria (yellow card) 7'; Corchia (red card) 24'; Souaré (yellow card) 61'; Mavuba (yellow card) 88'	Stadium: Stade Auguste Delaune; Attendance: 13,004; Referee: Alexandre Castro

22 November 2014 14	Nice	0–0	Reims	Nice
20:00 CET (UTC+01:00)	Vercauteren (yellow card) 80'; Rafetraniaina (yellow card) 86'	Report	Oniangue (yellow card) 23'; Tacalfred (yellow card) 28'	Stadium: Allianz Riviera; Attendance: 15,207; Referee: Philippe Kalt

29 November 2014 15	Reims	2–1	Bastia	Reims
20:00 CET (UTC+01:00)	Ngog 10'; Moukandjo 85'	Report	Modesto 41'; Peybernes (yellow card) 74'	Stadium: Stade Auguste Delaune; Attendance: 13,340; Referee: Mikael Lesage

4 December 2014 16	Lyon	2–1	Reims	Lyon
21:00 CET (UTC+01:00)	Tolisso 6'; Koné (yellow card) 82'; Placide 90+1' (o.g.)	Report	Moukandjo 36'; Placide (yellow card) 81'	Stadium: Stade de Gerland; Attendance: 32,513; Referee: Saïd Ennjimi

7 December 2014 17	Reims	2–3	Guingamp	Reims
17:00 CET (UTC+01:00)	Charbonnier 6'; Oniangue (yellow card) 45+1', (goal) 68'; Tacalfred (yellow card) 73'	Report	Jacobsen 33'; Angoua (yellow card) 35'; Mandanne 47'; Beauvue 79'; Lévêque (yellow card) 85'; Sankharé (yellow card) 87'	Stadium: Stade Auguste Delaune; Attendance: 11,255; Referee: Frank Schneider

13 December 2014 18	Reims	3–2	Evian	Reims
20:00 CET (UTC+01:00)	Oniangue (yellow card) 6'; Diego 14', 80'; Charbonnier (yellow card) 30'; Signorino (yellow card) 68'; Mandi 78'	Report	Abdallah (yellow card) 29'; Tejeda (yellow card) 45'; Sougou (yellow card) 46'; Wass 57'; Cambon 69', (red card) 79'	Stadium: Stade Auguste Delaune; Attendance: 11,011; Referee: Benoît Millot

20 December 2014 19	Rennes	1–3	Reims	Rennes
20:00 CET (UTC+01:00)	Mexer 45'; Danzé (yellow card) 83'; Konradsen (yellow card) 90'; Prcić (yellow card) 90+3'	Report	Roberge (yellow card) 44'; Charbonnier 66'; Oniangue (yellow card) 71'; Ngog (yellow card) 74'; Fortes 76' de Préville 90'	Stadium: Stade de la Route de Lorient; Attendance: 17,739; Referee: Fredy Fautrel

10 January 2015 20	Reims	1–2	Saint-Étienne	Reims
20:00 CET (UTC+01:00)	Conte (yellow card) 20' (yellow-red card) 90'; Roberge (yellow card) 43'; Charbonnier (yellow card) 58'; Diego 90'	Report	Corgnet (yellow card) 32'; Mollo 44'; Hamouma 50'	Stadium: Stade Auguste Delaune; Attendance: 15,013; Referee: Sébastien Moreira

17 January 2015 21	Caen	4–1	Reims	Caen
20:00 CET (UTC+01:00)	Féret 4'; Privat 8'; Yahia 30'; Kanté (yellow card) 70'; Koita 76' (pen.)	Report	Bourillon (yellow card) 15'; Charbonnier 27' (pen.), (yellow card) 78'; Devaux (yellow card) 78'	Stadium: Stade Michel d'Ornano; Attendance: 13,193; Referee: Nicolas Rainville

25 January 2015 22	Reims	0–0	Lens	Reims
17:00 CET (UTC+01:00)	Bourillon (yellow card) 12'; Tacalfred (yellow card) 36'	Report	Cyprien (yellow card) 17'	Stadium: Stade Auguste Delaune; Attendance: 13,813; Referee: Lionel Jaffredo

31 January 2015 23	Toulouse	1–0	Reims	Toulouse
20:00 CET (UTC+01:00)	Didot (yellow card) 15'; Pešić 43', (yellow card) 44'; Doumbia (yellow card) 83'	Report	Weber (yellow card) 7'; Fortes (yellow card) 89'	Stadium: Stadium Municipal; Attendance: 15,115; Referee: Stéphane Jochem

7 February 2015 24	Reims	1–3	Lorient	Reims
20:00 CET (UTC+01:00)	Moukandjo 42'; Signorino (yellow card) 73'	Report	Lecomte (yellow card) 42'; Gassama 50'; Guerreiro 63'; Jeannot 85'	Stadium: Stade Auguste Delaune; Attendance: 11,757; Referee: Benoît Bastien

13 February 2015 25	Marseille	2–2	Reims	Marseille
20:30 CET (UTC+01:00)	Thauvin (yellow card) 31'; Payet 58'; Ayew 69'	Report	De Préville 6'; Devaux (yellow card) 43'; Mandi (yellow card) 69'; Ngog 90'	Stadium: Stade Vélodrome; Attendance: 43,653; Referee: Philippe Kalt

22 February 2015 26	Reims	0–0	Metz	Reims
17:00 CET (UTC+01:00)	Conte (yellow card) 49'	Report	Philipps (yellow card) 53'; Palomino (yellow card) 61'	Stadium: Stade Auguste Delaune; Attendance: 12,575; Referee: Wilfried Bien

28 February 2015 27	Bordeaux	1–1	Reims	Bordeaux
20:00 CET (UTC+01:00)	Thelin 18'; Chantôme (yellow card) 59'	Report	Charbonnier 32'; Signorino (yellow card) 72'	Stadium: Stade Chaban-Delmas; Attendance: 19,212; Referee: Tony Chapron

7 March 2015 28	Reims	3–1	Nantes	Reims
20:00 CET (UTC+01:00)	Bourillon 14', (yellow card) 55'; Mandi 16'; Signorino (yellow card) 30'; Ngog 59'; Charbonnier (yellow card) 77'; Conte (yellow card) 90+1'	Report	Cissokho (yellow card) 23'; Alhadhur (red card) 44'; Bangoura (yellow card) 45+1', (goal) 77'	Stadium: Stade Auguste Delaune; Attendance: 15,261; Referee: Alexandre Castro

14 March 2015 29	Montpellier	3–1	Reims	Montpellier
20:00 CET (UTC+01:00)	Lucas Barrios 4', 73'; Dabo (yellow card) 48'; Sanson 90+2'	Report	Charbonnier (yellow card) 7'; Oniangue 87'	Stadium: Stade de la Mosson; Attendance: 11,250; Referee: Fredy Fautrel

22 March 2015 30	Reims	1–3	Monaco	Reims
17:00 CET (UTC+01:00)	Conte (yellow card) 21'; Moukandjo (yellow card) 65'; Diego 70'; Mavinga (yellow card) 78'	Report	Fabinho 5'; Martial 14'; Toulalan (yellow card) 43'; Carrasco (yellow card) 53'; Dirar 79'	Stadium: Stade Auguste Delaune; Attendance: 14,692; Referee: Frank Schneider

4 April 2015 31	Lille	3–1	Reims	Villeneuve-d'Ascq
20:00 CEST (UTC+02:00)	Corchia 18'; Origi 48'; Kjær (yellow card) 49'; Roux 72'	Report	Bourillon (yellow card) 30'; Diego (yellow card) 38'; De Préville 52'; Signorino (yellow card) 54'	Stadium: Stade Pierre-Mauroy; Attendance: 38,632; Referee: Olivier Thual

12 April 2015 32	Reims	0–1	Nice	Reims
17:00 CEST (UTC+02:00)	Mandi (yellow card) 31'; Diego (yellow card) 75'; Kyei (yellow card) 77'	Report	Benrahma 4'; Bauthéac (yellow card) 29'; Genevois (yellow card) 36'; Amavi (yellow card) 51'	Stadium: Stade Auguste Delaune; Attendance: 14,905; Referee: Mikael Lesage

18 April 2015 33	Bastia	1–2	Reims	Furiani
20:00 CEST (UTC+02:00)	Gillet (yellow card) 25'; Sio 47'; Cahuzac (yellow card) 54'; Peybernes (yellow card) 71'	Report	Ngog 5', (yellow card) 37'; Fofana (yellow card) 41'; Mandi 45+1'; Weber (yellow card) 49'; Roberge (yellow card) 69' de Préville (yellow card) 70'	Stadium: Stade Armand Cesari; Attendance: 15,452; Referee: Benoît Millot

25 April 2015 34	Reims	2–4	Lyon	Reims
21:00 CEST (UTC+02:00)	Peuget 13', (yellow card) 82'; Charbonnier 90+2'	Report	Tolisso 2'; Lacazette 6', (yellow card) 61'; N'Jie 19'; Jallet (yellow card) 70'; Fekir (yellow card) 73'; Tacalfred 90' (o.g.)	Stadium: Stade Auguste Delaune; Attendance: 19,270; Referee: Fredy Fautrel

2 May 2015 35	Guingamp	2–0	Reims	Guingamp
20:00 CEST (UTC+02:00)	Beauvue 62' (pen.); Cardy (yellow card) 87'; Mandanne 90+4'	Report	Placide (yellow card) 61'	Stadium: Stade du Roudourou; Attendance: 14,662; Referee: Alexandre Castro

9 May 2015 36	Evian	2–3	Reims	Annecy
20:00 CEST (UTC+02:00)	Wass (yellow card) 25'; Nounkeu (yellow card) 29'; Sunu 45+3'; Duhamel 48'	Report	Ngog (yellow card) 11', (goal) 40', 64'; Albæk (yellow card) 60'; Moukandjo 85', (yellow card) 85'	Stadium: Parc des Sports; Attendance: 13,740; Referee: Lionel Jaffredo

16 May 2015 37	Reims	1–0	Rennes	Reims
21:00 CEST (UTC+02:00)	Oniangue (yellow card) 8'; Mfulu (yellow card) 37'; Charbonnier 60' (pen.)	Report	Mexer (yellow card) 59'; Ntep (yellow card) 67'	Stadium: Stade Auguste Delaune; Attendance: 16,712; Referee: Stéphane Lannoy

23 May 2015 38	Paris Saint-Germain	3–2	Reims	Paris
21:00 CEST (UTC+02:00)	Cavani 30', 83'; Rabiot 45'	Report	Fofana (yellow card) 20'; Albæk (yellow card) 35'; Mandi 54'; Kyei 84'	Stadium: Parc des Princes; Attendance: 46,297; Referee: Clément Turpin

=== Coupe de la Ligue ===
28 October 2014 Round of 32	Reims	2–3 (a.e.t.)	Arles-Avignon	Reims
20:00 CEST (UTC+02:00)	de Préville 26'; Tacalfred (yellow card) 68'; Courtet 90'; Mandi (yellow card) 112'; Diego (yellow card) 118'	Report	Niang 63'; Ouaamar (yellow card) 74', (goal) 102'; Savanier 81', (yellow card) 110'; Gigot (yellow card) 90+3' (yellow-red card) 92'; Rodriguez (yellow card) 93'; Delač (yellow card) 93'; Bonne (yellow card) 119'	Stadium: Stade Auguste Delaune; Attendance: 7,336; Referee: Antony Gautier

=== Coupe de France ===
3 January 2015 Round of 64	US Lusitanos	1–3	Reims	Créteil
18:00 CET (UTC+01:00)	Ayi (yellow card) 43'	Report 1, 2	Diego 39', (yellow card) 90+3'; Charbonnier 51' de Préville 58'; Mavinga (yellow card) 64'	Stadium: Stade Dominique Duvauchelle; Attendance: 4,000; Referee: Alexandre Perreau Niel

22 January 2015 Round of 32	Rennes	1–1 (a.e.t.) (5–4 p)	Reims	Rennes
21:00 CET (UTC+01:00)	Armand 29' (pen.); Konradsen (yellow card) 64'	Report 1, 2	Kyei 70'; Charbonnier (yellow card) 90'	Stadium: Stade de la Route de Lorient; Attendance: 8,566; Referee: Sébastien Desiage
	Penalties
	Danzé (penalty scored); Fernandes (penalty scored); Habibou (penalty missed); Henrique (penalty scored); Armand (penalty missed); Doucouré (penalty scored); Konradsen (penalty scored)		(penalty scored) Bourillon; (penalty scored) Charbonnier; (penalty scored) Courtet; (penalty missed) Kyei; (penalty missed) Devaux; (penalty scored) Conte; (penalty missed) Mfulu
