= Jordan Pefok =

American soccer player (born 1996)

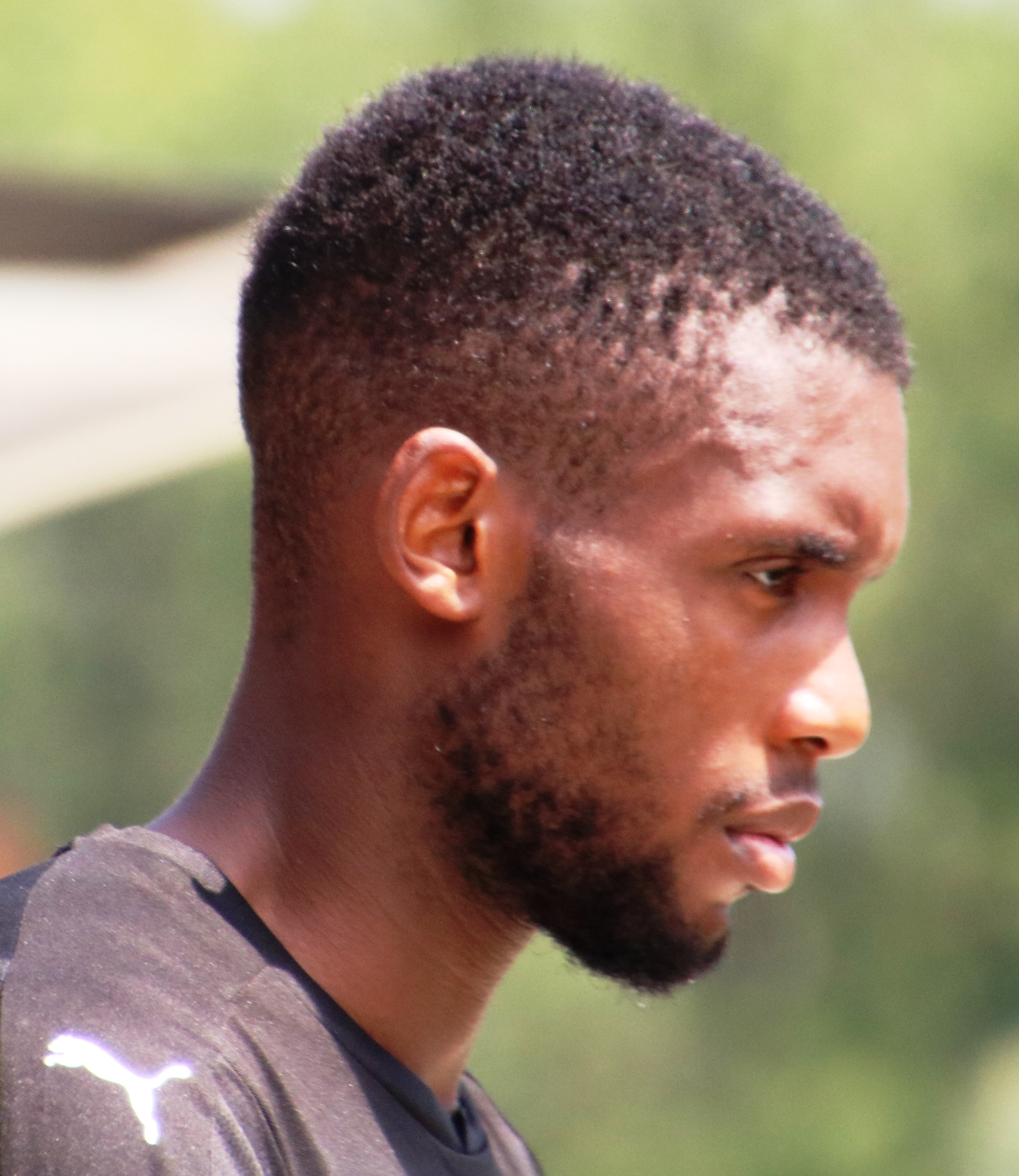
- Jordan in 2018

Personal information
- Full name: Theoson-Jordan Siebatcheu
- Date of birth: April 26, 1996 (age 30)
- Place of birth: Washington, D.C., United States
- Height: 6 ft 3 in (1.91 m)
- Position: Striker

Team information
- Current team: Greuther Fürth
- Number: 9

Youth career
- 2003–2015: Reims

Senior career*
Years	Team	Apps	(Gls)
2013–2016	Reims II	18	(4)
2015–2018	Reims	69	(20)
2017	→ Châteauroux (loan)	15	(10)
2018–2021	Rennes	29	(3)
2020	Rennes II	1	(0)
2020–2021	→ Young Boys (loan)	32	(12)
2021–2022	Young Boys	32	(22)
2022–2025	Union Berlin	50	(4)
2023–2024	→ Borussia Mönchengladbach (loan)	25	(5)
2025–2026	Reims	10	(1)
2025–2026	→ Tondela (loan)	22	(1)
2026–	Greuther Fürth	0	(0)

International career^{‡}
2017	France U21	2	(1)
2021–2022	United States	9	(1)
Medal record
Representing United States
Men's soccer
CONCACAF Nations League
Winner	2021 United States
- * Club domestic league appearances and goals as of August 29, 2026 ‡ National team caps and goals as of March 24, 2022

Theoson-Jordan Siebatcheu (born April 26, 1996), commonly known as Jordan Pefok, Jordan Siebatcheu, or just Jordan, is an American professional soccer player who plays as a striker for 2. Bundesliga club Greuther Fürth.

== Club career ==
=== Reims ===
Jordan is a youth product of Reims, having joined the club as a 7-year-old. He made his Ligue 1 debut on January 31, 2015, against Toulouse, replacing Alexi Peuget after 67 minutes in a 1–0 away defeat. On August 9, 2015, Jordan scored his first Ligue 1 goal in only his second appearance, against Girondins de Bordeaux. He signed his first professional contract in September 2015 committing to a three-year deal with Reims.

On October 24, 2017, Jordan was named the Ligue 2 Player of the Month for September due to ranking among the league's best in both goals and assists, while leading Reims to the top of the Ligue 2 table. On December 16, 2017, he set a career high for goals in a match by netting a hat trick against Valenciennes. Jordan helped Reims win the 2017–18 Ligue 2 season and promotion to Ligue 1 for the 2018–19 season while also setting a record for the number of points in a Ligue 2 season. He finished the season with 17 goals, the second-highest total among all Ligue 2 players, as well as seven assists.

=== Rennes ===
On June 12, 2018, Jordan signed a contract with Ligue 1 side Rennes. On September 20, he made his European debut in the 2018–19 UEFA Europa League group stage for Rennes. On November 8, he scored his first European goal, against Dynamo Kyiv. On December 22, he had his first Ligue 1 brace, scoring two goals and adding an assist against Nîmes in a 4–0 victory.

=== Young Boys ===
On September 13, 2020, Jordan was loaned to Swiss side Young Boys. After recording 15 goals and four assists across all competitions during the loan, Young Boys exercised the option to make the move permanent, effective July 1, 2021.

On September 14, 2021, Jordan scored the winning goal in the opening match of the 2021–22 UEFA Champions League group stage. His winner for Young Boys came in the final minute of stoppage time for a 2–1 win against Manchester United.

Jordan earned the Swiss Super League scoring title for the 2021–22 season with 22 league goals, despite missing most of May 2022 due to injury. He became the first American to win the Golden Boot for a European league. Jordan recorded a career-best 27 goals and five assists across all competitions during the year including UEFA Champions League and its qualifiers.

=== Union Berlin ===
On June 30, 2022, Jordan joined Union Berlin on a transfer from Young Boys. He scored on his debut for the club against Regionalliga Nordost club Chemnitzer FC in the first round of the DFB-Pokal on August 1, then scored again against city rivals Hertha in the league opener on August 6.

==== Loan to Borussia Mönchengladbach ====
On August 31, 2023, Jordan moved to Borussia Mönchengladbach on a season-long loan with an option to buy.

=== Return to Reims ===
On February 4, 2025, Jordan returned to Reims on a three-season contract.

On September 1, 2025, he was loaned by Tondela in Portugal.

== International career ==
Jordan was born in Washington, D.C. to Cameroonian parents and grew up in France. As a result, he was initially eligible to play for France, Cameroon, or the United States internationally.

Jordan was called up for the first time to the France under-21 national team for two friendly matches in June 2017. He scored against Albania under-21s in his debut, and also played against Cameroon under-20s.

The United States Soccer Federation inquired about Jordan, and he was invited to the United States camp for a match against France in June 2018 but declined the call-up, citing his transfer from Reims to Rennes, while leaving the door open for possible inclusion in the United States squad in the future. On March 10, 2021, he announced that he had committed to play for the United States.

Jordan made his debut for the United States on March 25, 2021, in a 4–1 friendly win over Jamaica. On June 3, 2021, he scored the winning goal in the 89th minute of a 1–0 win over Honduras in the CONCACAF Nations League semifinal, after entering the game as a late substitution.

== Name ==
Jordan wears Pefok, his mother's maiden name, on the back of his jersey for the United States. He also wore it on the back of his Young Boys jersey, but decided to switch to using only his first name Jordan for Union Berlin. On the squad page for Union Berlin, he identified as Jordan Siebatcheu, which continued after his move to Reims.

== Career statistics ==
=== Club ===
As of match played March 9, 2026

Appearances and goals by club, season and competition
Club	Season	League			National cup (Note: Includes Coupe de France, Swiss Cup, DFB-Pokal)		League cup (Note: Includes Coupe de la Ligue)		Continental		Other		Total	
Club	Season	Division	Apps	Goals	Apps	Goals	Apps	Goals	Apps	Goals	Apps	Goals	Apps	Goals
Reims II	2013–14	CFA 2	12	2	—		—		—		—		12	2
Reims II	2015–16	CFA 2	2	2	—		—		—		—		2	2
Reims II	2016–17	CFA	4	0	—		—		—		—		4	0
Reims II	Total		18	4	—		—		—		—		18	4
Reims	2014–15	Ligue 1	1	0	0	0	0	0	—		—		1	0
Reims	2015–16	Ligue 1	25	3	0	0	1	0	—		—		26	3
Reims	2016–17	Ligue 2	8	0	1	3	1	1	—		—		10	4
Reims	2017–18	Ligue 2	35	17	2	1	1	0	—		—		38	18
Reims	Total		69	20	3	4	3	1	—		—		75	25
Châteauroux (loan)	2016–17	Championnat National	15	10	1	1	0	0	—		—		16	11
Rennes	2018–19	Ligue 1	15	3	3	3	2	0	3 (Note: Appearance(s) in UEFA Europa League)	1	—		23	7
Rennes	2019–20	Ligue 1	14	0	2	1	—		5	0	—		21	1
Rennes	Total		29	3	5	4	2	0	8	1	—		44	8
Young Boys (loan)	2020–21	Swiss Super League	32	12	1	0	—		10 (Note: One appearance in UEFA Champions League, nine appearances and three goals in UEFA Europa League)	3	—		43	15
Young Boys	2021–22	Swiss Super League	32	22	1	0	—		12 (Note: Appearances in UEFA Champions League)	5	—		45	27
Union Berlin	2022–23	Bundesliga	31	4	3	1	—		8	0	—		42	5
Union Berlin	2023–24	Bundesliga	1	0	1	0	—		—		—		2	0
Union Berlin	2024–25	Bundesliga	18	0	2	0	—		—		—		20	0
Union Berlin	Total		50	4	6	1	—		8	0	—		64	5
Borussia Mönchengladbach (loan)	2023–24	Bundesliga	25	5	2	2	—		—		—		27	7
Reims	2024–25	Ligue 1	7	1	2	0	—		—		2 (Note: Appearances in the Ligue 1 relegation/promotion play-offs)	0	11	1
Reims	2025–26	Ligue 2	3	0	0	0	—		—		—		3	0
Reims	Total		10	1	2	0	—		—		2	0	14	1
C.D. Tondela (loan)	2025–26	Primeira Liga	18	1	0	0	1	0	—		—		19	1
Career total			298	82	21	12	6=7	1	37	9	2	0	365	104

=== International ===
As of match played March 24, 2022

Appearances and goals by national team and year
National team	Year	Apps	Goals
United States	2021	8	1
United States	2022	1	0
Total		9	1

Scores and results list the United States' goal tally first, score column indicates score after each Pefok goal.

List of international goals scored by Jordan Pefok
No.	Date	Venue	Cap	Opponent	Score	Result	Competition
1	June 3, 2021	Empower Field at Mile High, Denver, United States	4	Honduras	1–0	1–0	2021 CONCACAF Nations League Finals

== Honors ==
Reims

- Ligue 2: 2017–18

Rennes

- Coupe de France: 2018–19

Young Boys

- Swiss Super League: 2020–21

Reims

- Coupe de France runner-up: 2024–25

United States

- CONCACAF Nations League: 2019–20

Individual

- Swiss Super League top scorer: 2021–22 (22 Goals)
