= Antoine Conte =

Footballer (born 1994)

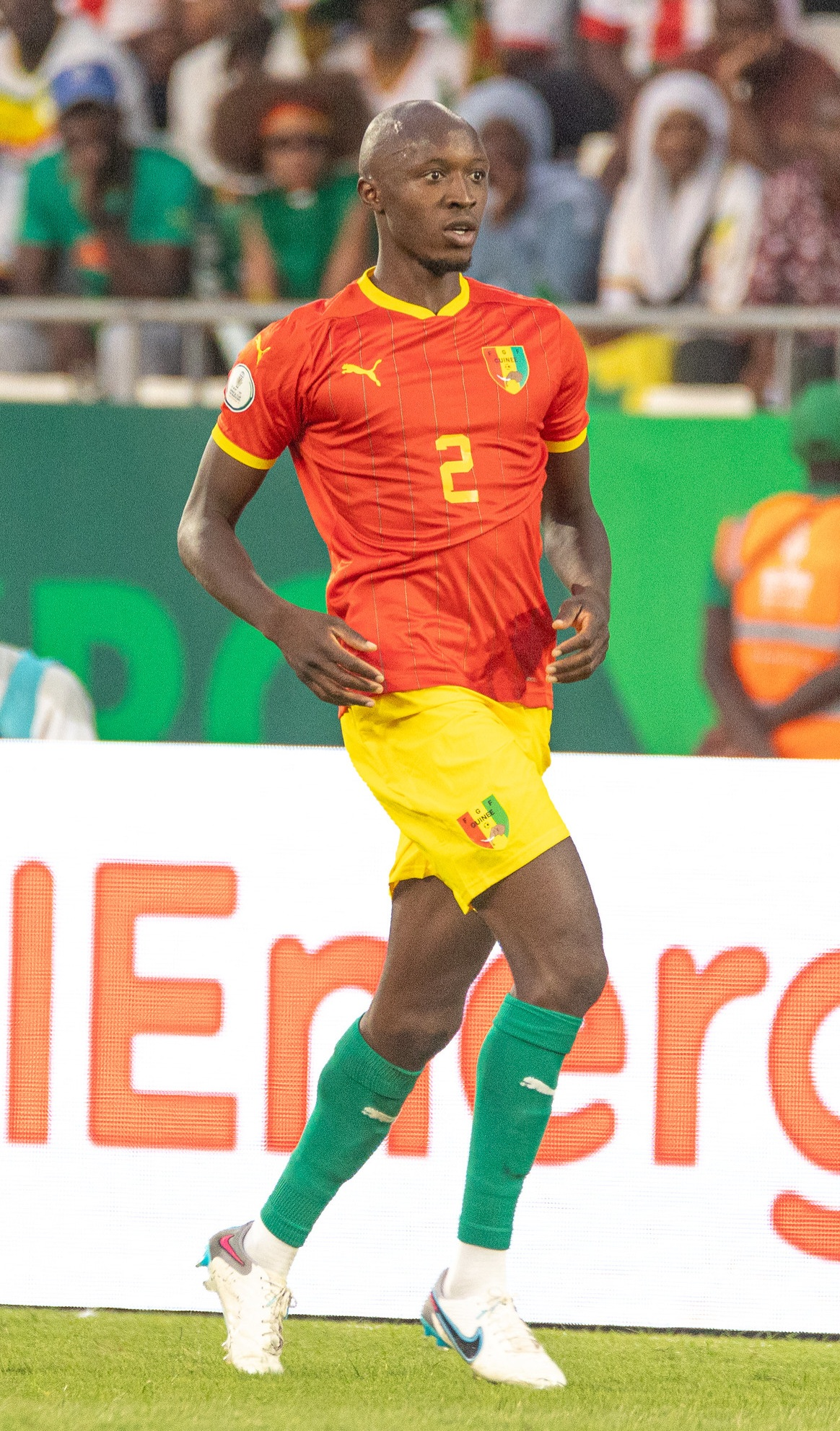
- Conte with Guinea in 2024

Personal information
- Date of birth: 29 January 1994 (age 32)
- Place of birth: Paris, France
- Height: 1.79 m (5 ft 10 in)
- Position: Right-back

Youth career
- 2002–2006: AS Val de Fontenay
- 2006–2007: CO Vincennois
- 2007–2013: Paris Saint-Germain

Senior career*
| Years | Team | Apps | (Gls) |
| 2013–2014 | Paris Saint-Germain | 1 | (0) |
| 2013–2014 | → Reims (loan) | 9 | (0) |
| 2014–2017 | Reims | 49 | (0) |
| 2017 | → Beitar Jerusalem (loan) | 14 | (0) |
| 2017–2021 | Beitar Jerusalem | 69 | (2) |
| 2021–2022 | Universitatea Craiova | 10 | (0) |
| 2022–2023 | Hapoel Tel Aviv | 16 | (0) |
| 2023–2025 | Botev Plovdiv | 30 | (0) |
| 2025–2026 | Iğdır FK | 27 | (1) |
| 2026 | Botev Plovdiv | 10 | (0) |

International career^{‡}
| 2011 | France U17 | 3 | (0) |
| 2011 | France U18 | 2 | (0) |
| 2013 | France U19 | 10 | (2) |
| 2013–2014 | France U20 | 6 | (0) |
| 2014–2016 | France U21 | 6 | (0) |
| 2022– | Guinea | 23 | (0) |
Medal record
Representing France
Men's football
UEFA European Under-19 Championship
| Runner-up | 2013 Lithuania |
- * Club domestic league appearances and goals as of 11 June 2026 ‡ National team caps and goals as of 3:41, 12 September 2026 (UTC+2)

Antoine Conte (born 29 January 1994) is a professional footballer who plays as a right-back. Born in France, he represents the Guinea national team.

== Club career ==
Conte made his debut in the Ligue 1 on 1 February 2013 against Toulouse replacing Mamadou Sakho after 76 minutes.

On 31 January 2017, Conte joined Beitar Jerusalem on loan until the end of the season with an option given to Beitar Jerusalem to sign him permanently.

On 15 June 2017, signed permanently with Beitar agreeing to a three-year contract.

In February 2021, after being sentenced to a one-year prison sentence by the court in France, Beitar released Conte.

== International career ==
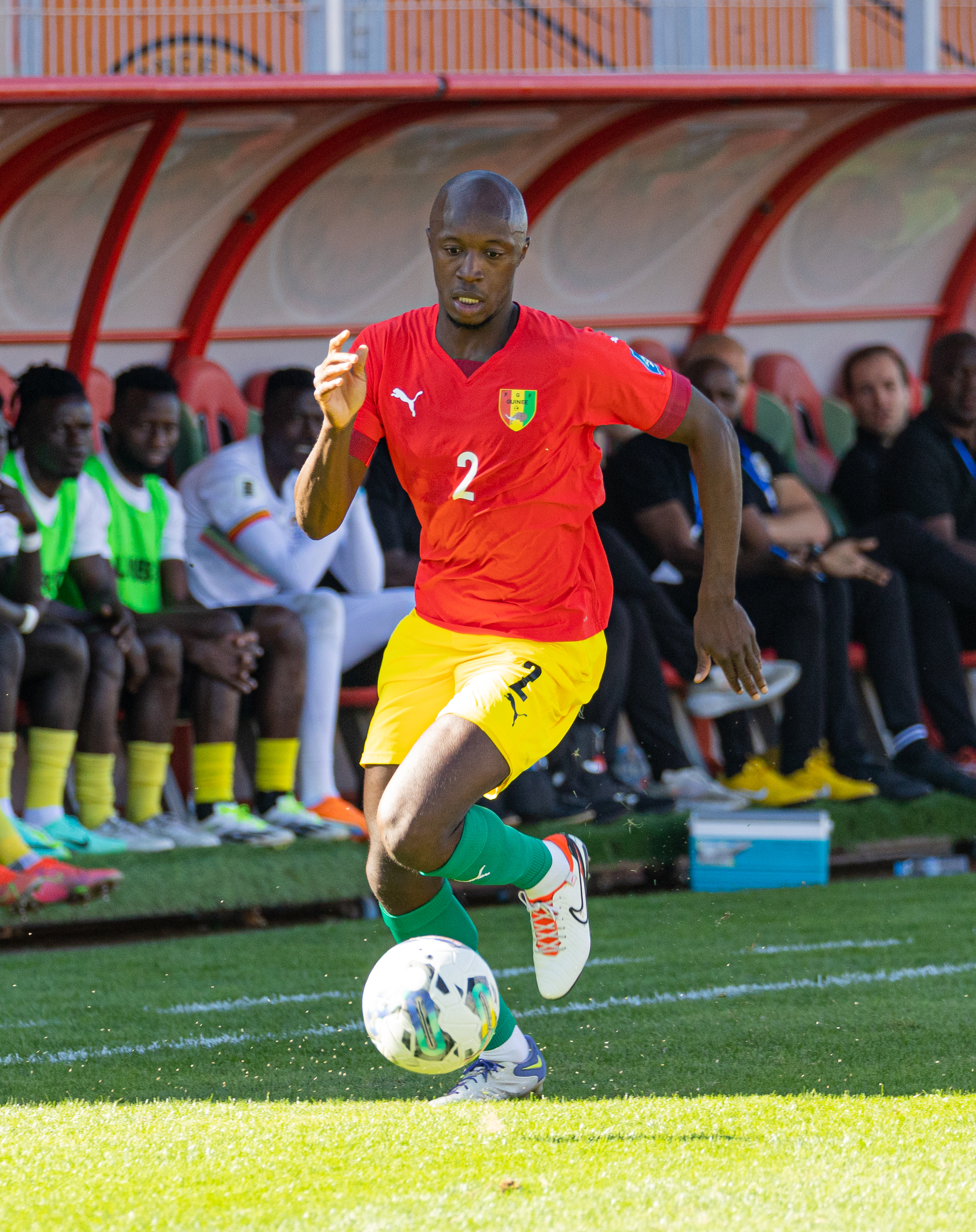
Conte with Guinea in 2023

Born in France, Conte is Guinean by descent. He has represented France at numerous youth levels all the way up to under-21 level. He debuted with the Guinea national team in a friendly 0–0 tie with South Africa on 25 March 2022.

On 23 December 2023, he was selected from the list of 25 Guinean players selected by Kaba Diawara to compete in the 2023 Africa Cup of Nations.

== Personal life ==
On 8 December 2016, Conte was held by French Police for assaulting his girlfriend and attacking a 19-year-old man, who tried to help, with a baseball bat, inflicting leg, arm and head injuries, including a brain haemorrhage. In January 2021, he was sentenced to three years of prison. In May he filed an appeal for the reduction of his sentence.

== Career statistics ==
=== Club ===
As of match played 2 March 2024

Appearances and goals by club, season and competition
| Club | Season | League | | | National cup | | League cup | | Europe | | Other | | Total | |
| Club | Season | Division | Apps | Goals | Apps | Goals | Apps | Goals | Apps | Goals | Apps | Goals | Apps | Goals |
|---|---|---|---|---|---|---|---|---|---|---|---|---|---|---|
| Paris Saint-Germain | 2012–13 | Ligue 1 | 1 | 0 | 0 | 0 | 0 | 0 | 0 | 0 | 0 | 0 | 1 | 0 |
| Reims (loan) | 2013–14 | Ligue 1 | 9 | 0 | 0 | 0 | 1 | 0 | — | | — | | 10 | 0 |
| Reims | 2014–15 | Ligue 1 | 29 | 0 | 2 | 0 | 0 | 0 | — | | — | | 31 | 0 |
| Reims | 2015–16 | Ligue 1 | 11 | 0 | 0 | 0 | 0 | 0 | — | | — | | 11 | 0 |
| Reims | 2016–17 | Ligue 2 | 9 | 0 | 1 | 0 | 1 | 0 | — | | — | | 11 | 0 |
| Reims | Total | | 49 | 0 | 3 | 0 | 1 | 0 | — | | — | | 53 | 0 |
| Reims II | 2016–17 | Championnat National | 1 | 0 | — | | — | | — | | — | | 1 | 0 |
| Beitar Jerusalem (loan) | 2016–17 | Israeli Premier League | 14 | 0 | 3 | 0 | — | | — | | — | | 17 | 0 |
| Beitar Jerusalem | 2017–18 | Israeli Premier League | 29 | 0 | 3 | 0 | — | | 4 (Note: Appearances in UEFA Europa League) | 0 | — | | 36 | 0 |
| Beitar Jerusalem | 2018–19 | Israeli Premier League | 6 | 0 | 0 | 0 | — | | — | | — | | 6 | 0 |
| Beitar Jerusalem | 2019–20 | Israeli Premier League | 23 | 2 | 1 | 0 | — | | — | | — | | 24 | 2 |
| Beitar Jerusalem | 2020–21 | Israeli Premier League | 11 | 0 | 0 | 0 | — | | — | | — | | 11 | 0 |
| Beitar Jerusalem | Total | | 69 | 2 | 4 | 0 | — | | 4 | 0 | — | | 77 | 2 |
| Universitatea Craiova | 2021–22 | Liga I | 10 | 0 | 1 | 0 | — | | 1 (Note: Appearance in UEFA Europa Conference League) | 0 | 1 (Note: Appearance in Supercupa României) | 0 | 13 | 0 |
| Hapoel Tel Aviv | 2022–23 | Israeli Premier League | 16 | 0 | 1 | 0 | — | | — | | — | | 17 | 0 |
| Botev Plovdiv | 2023–24 | Bulgarian First League | 12 | 0 | 3 | 0 | — | | — | | — | | 15 | 0 |
| Career total | | | 181 | 2 | 15 | 0 | 2 | 0 | 5 | 0 | 1 | 0 | 204 | 2 |

=== International ===
As of matches played on 2 February 2024

Appearances and goals by national team and year
| National team | Year | Apps | Goals |
|---|---|---|---|
| Guinea | 2022 | 5 | 0 |
| Guinea | 2023 | 6 | 0 |
| Guinea | 2024 | 5 | 0 |
| Total | | 16 | 0 |

== Honours ==
Paris Saint-Germain

- Ligue 1: 2012–13

Beitar Jerusalem

- Toto Cup: 2019–20

Universitatea Craiova

- Supercupa României: 2021

Botev Plovdiv

- Bulgarian Cup: 2023–24

France U19

- UEFA European Under-19 Championship runner-up: 2013

France U21

- Toulon Tournament runner-up: 2014

Individual

- UEFA European Under-19 Championship Team of the Tournament: 2013
