= Omenuke Mfulu =

Footballer (born 1994)

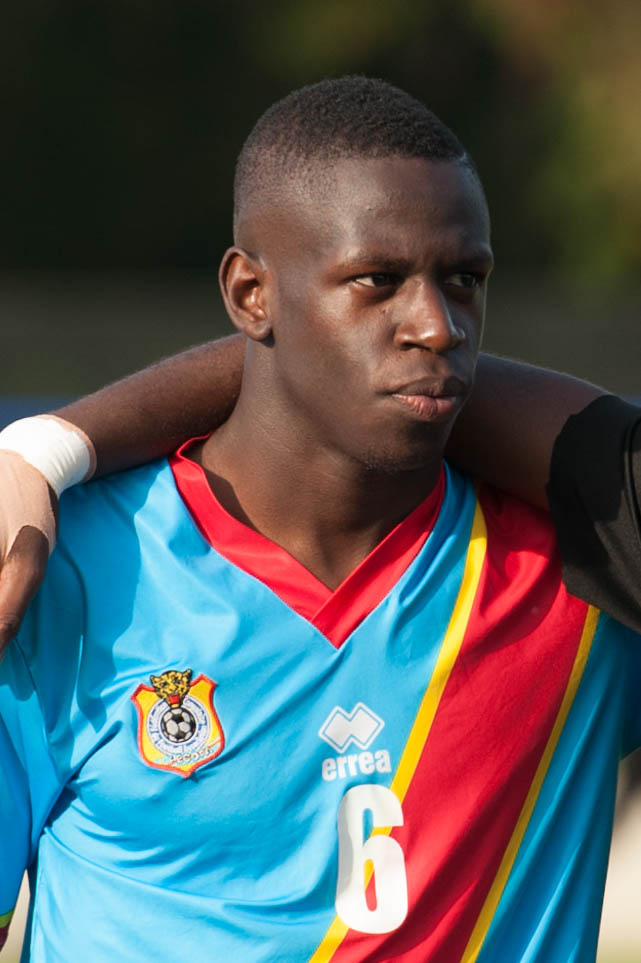
- Mfulu with DR Congo U21 in 2014

Personal information
- Date of birth: 20 March 1994 (age 32)
- Place of birth: Poissy, France
- Height: 1.83 m (6 ft 0 in)
- Position: Defensive midfielder

Team information
- Current team: Ponferradina
- Number: 21

Youth career
- –2013: Lille

Senior career*
| Years | Team | Apps | (Gls) |
| 2012–2013 | Lille B | 3 | (0) |
| 2013–2017 | Reims B | 45 | (1) |
| 2014–2017 | Reims | 20 | (0) |
| 2017–2019 | Red Star | 48 | (0) |
| 2019–2021 | Elche | 38 | (0) |
| 2021–2024 | Las Palmas | 63 | (0) |
| 2024–2025 | Deportivo La Coruña | 25 | (0) |
| 2026– | Ponferradina | 1 | (0) |

International career^{‡}
| 2012–2014 | DR Congo U21 | 6 | (0) |
| 2020– | DR Congo | 5 | (0) |
- * Club domestic league appearances and goals as of 25 May 2026 ‡ National team caps and goals as of 10:00, 21 January 2024 (UTC)

Omenuke Mfulu (born 20 March 1994) is a professional footballer who plays as a defensive midfielder for Ponferradina. Born in France, he plays for the DR Congo national team.

== Early life ==
Mfulu was born in Poissy, France, to Congolese parents. He acquired French nationality on 27 September 2004, through the collective effect of his father's naturalization.

== Club career ==
Mfulu moved to Reims from Lille OSC in the summer of 2013, and did enough with the reserve team to earn a three-year professional contract with the Ligue 1 club the following January. He made his professional debut as a substitute in a 0–0 draw with OGC Nice on 22 November 2014. His full debut came on 16 May 2015 in a 1–0 victory over Rennes.

After four years with Reims, Mfulu signed for Red Star in Championnat National on 5 August 2017. On 17 June 2019, he moved to Spain and signed for Elche CF.

On 2 August 2021, Mfulu signed a two-year contract with UD Las Palmas. On 5 August 2024, he agreed to a two-year deal with Deportivo de La Coruña.

On 5 August 2025, Mfulu terminated his link with Dépor.

== International career ==
On 9 October 2020, he represented the DR Congo national team in a friendly 3–0 loss to Burkina Faso.

On 27 December 2023, Mfulu was included in the final 24-man squad for the 2023 Africa Cup of Nations. He started his nation's first match at the tournament, a 1–1 draw with Zambia on 17 January 2024.

== Career statistics ==
=== Club ===
As of match played 24 January 2025

Appearances and goals by club, season and competition
| Club | Season | League | | | National cup (Note: Includes Coupe de France, Copa del Rey) | | League cup (Note: Includes Coupe de la Ligue) | | Other | | Total | |
| Club | Season | Division | Apps | Goals | Apps | Goals | Apps | Goals | Apps | Goals | Apps | Goals |
|---|---|---|---|---|---|---|---|---|---|---|---|---|
| Reims | 2013–14 | Ligue 1 | 0 | 0 | 0 | 0 | 0 | 0 | — | | 0 | 0 |
| Reims | 2014–15 | Ligue 1 | 7 | 0 | 1 | 0 | 0 | 0 | — | | 8 | 0 |
| Reims | 2015–16 | Ligue 1 | 13 | 0 | 1 | 0 | 1 | 0 | — | | 15 | 0 |
| Reims | Total | | 20 | 0 | 2 | 0 | 1 | 0 | — | | 23 | 0 |
| Red Star | 2017–18 | National 1 | 21 | 0 | 0 | 0 | 1 | 0 | — | | 22 | 0 |
| Red Star | 2018–19 | Ligue 2 | 27 | 0 | 1 | 0 | 0 | 0 | — | | 28 | 0 |
| Red Star | Total | | 48 | 0 | 1 | 0 | 1 | 0 | — | | 50 | 0 |
| Elche | 2019–20 | Segunda División | 18 | 0 | 3 | 0 | — | | 4 (Note: Appearances in La Liga play-offs) | 0 | 25 | 0 |
| Elche | 2020–21 | La Liga | 20 | 0 | 2 | 0 | — | | — | | 22 | 0 |
| Elche | Total | | 38 | 0 | 5 | 0 | — | | 4 | 0 | 47 | 0 |
| Las Palmas | 2021–22 | Segunda División | 30 | 0 | 0 | 0 | — | | — | | 30 | 0 |
| Las Palmas | 2022–23 | Segunda División | 30 | 0 | 1 | 0 | — | | — | | 31 | 0 |
| Las Palmas | 2023–24 | La Liga | 5 | 0 | 3 | 0 | — | | — | | 8 | 0 |
| Las Palmas | Total | | 65 | 0 | 4 | 0 | — | | — | | 69 | 0 |
| Deportivo de La Coruña | 2024–25 | Segunda División | 15 | 0 | 0 | 0 | — | | — | | 15 | 0 |
| Career total | | | 186 | 0 | 12 | 0 | 2 | 0 | 4 | 0 | 204 | 0 |

=== International ===
As of match played 24 June 2023

Appearances and goals by national team and year
| National team | Year | Apps | Goals |
|---|---|---|---|
| DR Congo | 2023 | 3 | 0 |
| DR Congo | 2024 | 2 | 0 |
| Total | | 5 | 0 |
