= Aïssa Mandi =

Algerian footballer (born 1991)

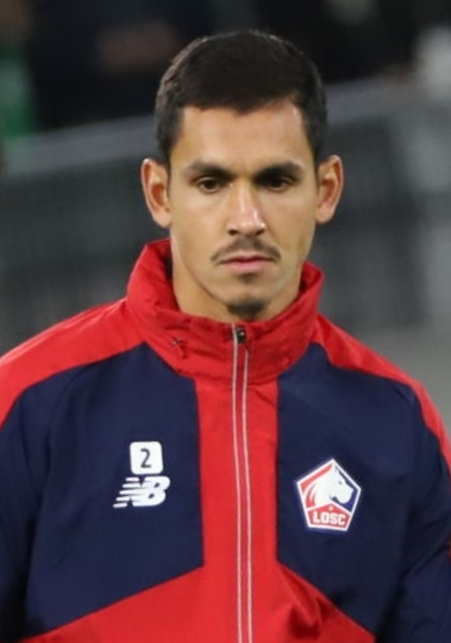
- Mandi with Lille in 2024

Personal information
- Full name: Aïssa Mandi
- Date of birth: 22 October 1991 (age 35)
- Place of birth: Châlons-en-Champagne, France
- Height: 1.84 m (6 ft 0 in)
- Position: Centre-back

Team information
- Current team: Levante
- Number: 2

Youth career
- 2000–2009: Reims

Senior career*
Years	Team	Apps	(Gls)
2009–2016	Reims	161	(14)
2016–2021	Real Betis	152	(7)
2021–2024	Villarreal	54	(2)
2024–2026	Lille	53	(1)
2026–	Levante	0	(0)

International career^{‡}
2013–2026	Algeria	123	(8)
Medal record
Men's football
Representing Algeria
Africa Cup of Nations
Winner	2019 Egypt
- * Club domestic league appearances and goals as of 17 May 2026 ‡ National team caps and goals as of 22 July 2026

Aïssa Mandi (Arabic: عيسى ماندي; born 22 October 1991) is a professional footballer who plays as a defender for La Liga club Levante. Born in France, he played for the Algeria national team. Mainly a centre-back, he can also play as a right-back.

Mandi made his international debut for Algeria in March 2014 and has since made over 120 appearances, making him the most-capped Algerian footballer of all time. He was a member of the Algerian team for the FIFA World Cup in 2014 and 2026, as well as the Africa Cup of Nations in 2015, 2017, 2019, 2021, 2023 and 2025, winning the 2019 tournament.

== Club career ==
=== Reims ===
Mandi started to play football at the age of 8 at Reims. On 20 August 2010, he made his professional debut as a starter for the club in a Ligue 2 match against Le Havre. During the 2011–12 season, Mandi made 26 appearances as Reims gained promotion from Ligue 2.

On 5 April 2014, Mandi scored two own goals in a match against Paris Saint-Germain.

=== Real Betis ===
On 30 June 2016, Mandi signed a five-year deal with La Liga side Real Betis.

=== Villarreal ===
On 16 June 2021, Mandi signed a four-year contract with fellow La Liga side Villarreal, as his contract with Betis expired.

On 11 August 2021, Mandi made his professional Villarreal debut against Chelsea in the 2021 UEFA Super Cup, where he went on to miss a penalty in the shoot-out.

=== Lille ===
On 1 August 2024, Mandi returned to France, signing for Lille on a two-year deal.

=== Levante ===
On 16 July 2026, Mandi returned to Spain after agreeing to a two-year contract with Levante in the top tier.

== International career ==
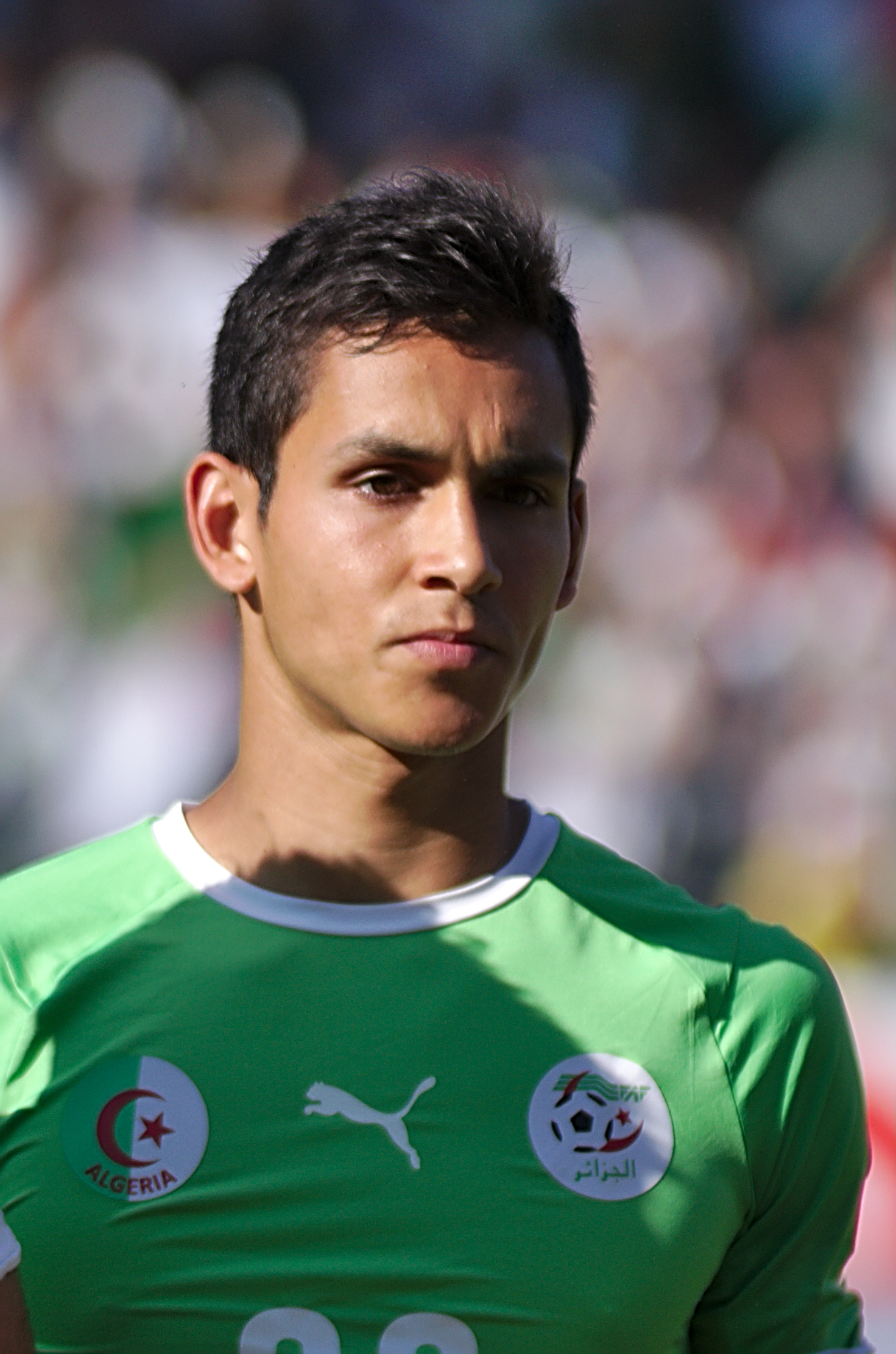
Mandi with Algeria in 2014

While he was also eligible to play for France, Mandi decided to play for Algeria and made his debut for them on 5 March 2014 in a 2–0 victory over Slovenia. He was one of the revelations of the Algerian national team during the 2014 World Cup in Brazil.

Mandi scored his first goal for Algeria in a 3–3 away draw to Ethiopia during the qualifiers for the 2017 Africa Cup of Nations in Gabon.

In December 2023, he was named in Algeria's squad for the 2023 Africa Cup of Nations. On 10 October 2024, he featured in his 100th international match for his nation in a 5–1 victory against Togo during the 2025 AFCON qualification.

On 6 January 2026, during AFCON finals, Mandi and Riyad Mahrez made their 23rd appearances at AFCON for Algeria, breaking Rabah Madjer's 34-year record.

On 31 May 2026, Mandi was named in Vladimir Petković's 26-man Algeria squad for the 2026 FIFA World Cup.

== Personal life ==
Mandi was born in the town of Châlons-en-Champagne in Northern France to Algerian parents from Chlef.

== Career statistics ==
=== Club ===
As of match played 17 May 2026

Appearances and goals by club, season and competition
Club	Season	League			National cup (Note: Includes Coupe de France, Copa del Rey)		League cup (Note: Includes Coupe de la Ligue)		Europe		Other		Total	
Club	Season	Division	Apps	Goals	Apps	Goals	Apps	Goals	Apps	Goals	Apps	Goals	Apps	Goals
Reims	2009–10	Championnat National	1	0	0	0	0	0	—		—		1	0
Reims	2010–11	Ligue 2	8	0	1	0	1	0	—		—		10	0
Reims	2011–12	Ligue 2	26	1	0	0	1	0	—		—		27	1
Reims	2012–13	Ligue 1	29	2	1	0	0	0	—		—		30	2
Reims	2013–14	Ligue 1	33	0	1	0	2	0	—		—		36	0
Reims	2014–15	Ligue 1	32	6	0	0	1	0	—		—		33	6
Reims	2015–16	Ligue 1	32	5	1	0	0	0	—		—		33	5
Reims	Total		161	14	4	0	5	0	0	0	0	0	170	14
Real Betis	2016–17	La Liga	26	2	2	0	—		—		—		28	2
Real Betis	2017–18	La Liga	34	1	1	0	—		—		—		35	1
Real Betis	2018–19	La Liga	35	1	7	1	—		6 (Note: Appearances in UEFA Europa League)	0	—		48	2
Real Betis	2019–20	La Liga	29	0	1	0	—		—		—		30	0
Real Betis	2020–21	La Liga	28	3	4	0	—		—		—		32	3
Real Betis	Total		152	7	15	1	0	0	6	0	0	0	173	8
Villarreal	2021–22	La Liga	17	1	2	1	—		2 (Note: Appearances in UEFA Champions League)	0	1 (Note: Appearance in UEFA Super Cup)	0	22	2
Villarreal	2022–23	La Liga	21	0	4	0	—		10 (Note: Appearances in UEFA Europa Conference League)	0	—		35	0
Villarreal	2023–24	La Liga	16	1	1	0	—		5	0	—		22	1
Villarreal	Total		54	2	7	1	0	0	17	0	1	0	79	3
Lille	2024–25	Ligue 1	24	0	1	0	—		6	0	—		31	0
Lille	2025–26	Ligue 1	29	1	0	0	—		11	0	—		40	1
Lille	Total		53	1	1	0	0	0	17	0	0	0	71	1
Career total			420	24	27	1	5	0	40	0	1	0	493	26

=== International ===
As of match played 2 July 2026

Appearances and goals by national team and year
National team	Year	Apps	Goals
Algeria	2014	10	0
Algeria	2015	11	0
Algeria	2016	4	1
Algeria	2017	11	0
Algeria	2018	6	0
Algeria	2019	13	0
Algeria	2020	4	0
Algeria	2021	9	2
Algeria	2022	12	1
Algeria	2023	8	0
Algeria	2024	15	2
Algeria	2025	12	1
Algeria	2026	9	1
Total		123	8

Scores and results list Algeria's goal tally first, score column indicates score after each Mandi goal.

List of international goals scored by Aïssa Mandi
No.	Date	Venue	Opponent	Score	Result	Competition
1	29 March 2016	Addis Ababa Stadium, Addis Ababa, Ethiopia	Ethiopia	2–2	3–3	2017 Africa Cup of Nations qualification
2	29 March 2021	Mustapha Tchaker Stadium, Blida, Algeria	Botswana	1–0	5–0	2021 Africa Cup of Nations qualification
3	12 October 2021	Stade Général Seyni Kountché, Niamey, Niger	Niger	2–0	4–0	2022 FIFA World Cup qualification
4	4 June 2022	Stade du 5 Juillet, Algiers, Algeria	Uganda	1–0	2–0	2023 Africa Cup of Nations qualification
5	22 March 2024	Nelson Mandela Stadium, Algiers, Algeria	Bolivia	3–2	3–2	2024 FIFA Series
6	17 November 2024	Hocine Aït Ahmed Stadium, Tizi Ouzou, Algeria	Liberia	1–1	5–1	2025 Africa Cup of Nations qualification
7	25 March 2025	Hocine Aït Ahmed Stadium, Tizi Ouzou, Algeria	Mozambique	2–0	5–1	2026 FIFA World Cup qualification
8	10 June 2026	Rock Chalk Park, Lawrence, United States	Bolivia	1–0	4–0	Friendly

== Honours ==
Stade de Reims

- Ligue 2 runner-up: 2011–12

Villarreal

- UEFA Super Cup runner-up: 2021

Algeria

- Africa Cup of Nations: 2019

Individual

- Lille OSC Player of the Season: 2025–26
- CIES Ligue 1 Team of the Season: 2025–26
- La Liga Top Passing Defender: 2018–19
- Algeria Player of the Month: March 2021

=== Records ===
- Algeria all-time caps record holder: 123 appearances
- Africa Cup of Nations Algerian appearance record: 23 matches

== See also ==
- List of men's footballers with 100 or more international caps
