= Nicolas de Préville =

French footballer (born 1991)

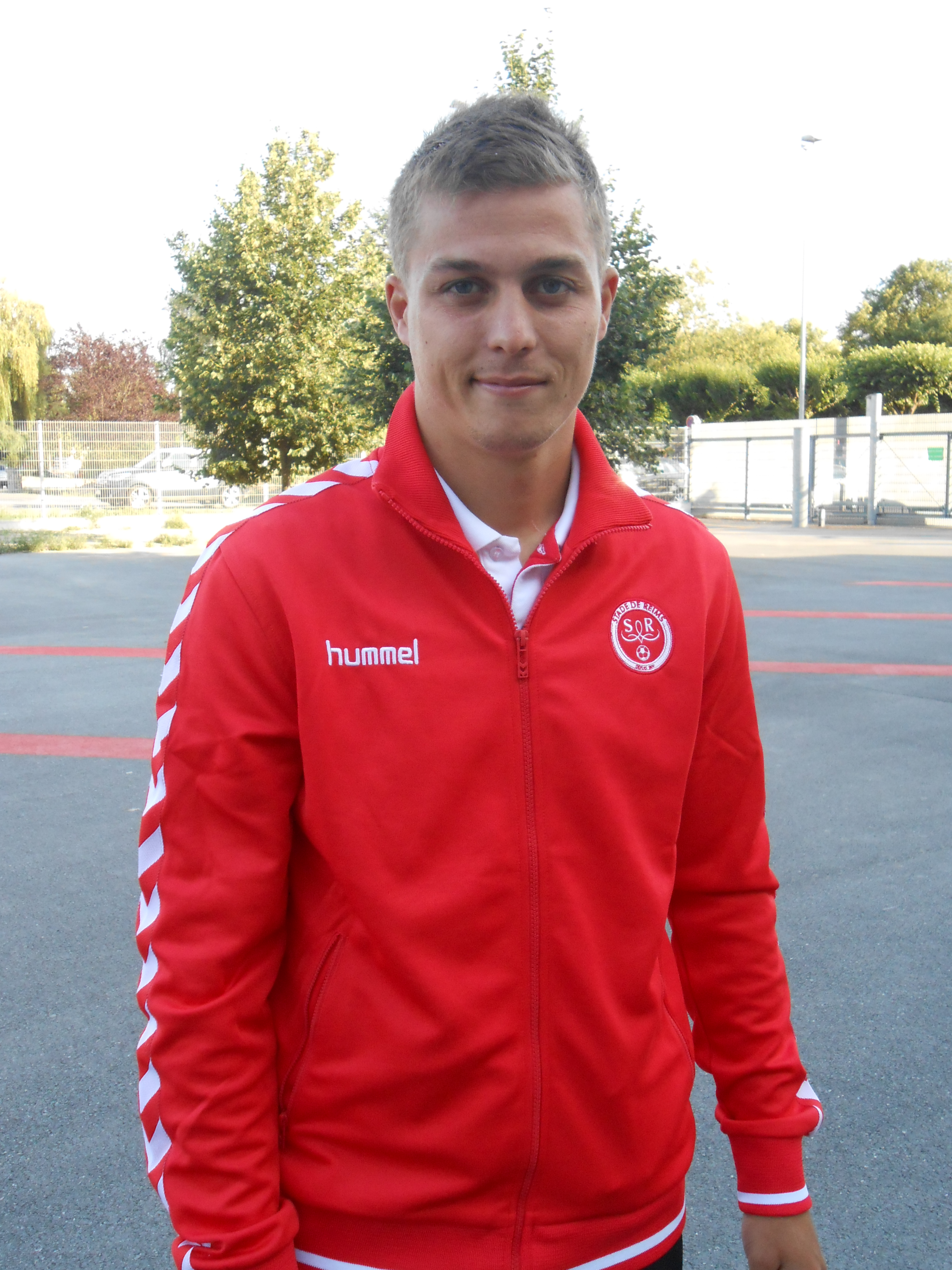
- De Préville in 2015

Personal information
- Full name: Nicolas de Roussel de Préville
- Date of birth: 8 January 1991 (age 35)
- Place of birth: Chambray-lès-Tours, France
- Height: 1.82 m (6 ft 0 in)
- Position: Striker

Youth career
- 1998–2001: Barjac
- 2001–2005: Alès
- 2005–2007: Caen
- 2007–2008: Bagnols Pont
- 2008–2009: Istres

Senior career*
| Years | Team | Apps | (Gls) |
| 2009–2013 | Istres | 69 | (12) |
| 2013–2016 | Reims | 103 | (15) |
| 2016–2017 | Oostende | 0 | (0) |
| 2016–2017 | → Lille (loan) | 30 | (14) |
| 2017 | Lille | 4 | (2) |
| 2017–2021 | Bordeaux | 109 | (14) |
| 2021–2022 | Metz | 27 | (5) |
| 2023 | 1. FC Kaiserslautern | 10 | (1) |
| 2023–2025 | Troyes | 33 | (8) |

International career^{‡}
| 2012 | France U20 | 5 | (3) |
- * Club domestic league appearances and goals as of 11 May 2025 ‡ National team caps and goals as of 1 June 2012

Nicolas de Roussel de Préville (born 8 January 1991) is a French professional footballer who plays as a striker.

== Career ==
Having joined FC Istres as a youth player in 2008, De Préville made his senior debut for the club on 14 August 2009 in a Ligue 2 match against Metz.

On 23 January 2013, he joined Ligue 1 side Stade de Reims on a 3.5-year contract. He finished the 2015–16 Ligue 1 season with six goals and nine assists.

In August 2016, De Préville joined Lille OSC. In a special transfer arrangement, Belgian club K.V. Oostende (whose president Marc Coucke was at that time a minority shareholder of Lille OSC), bought the player from Reims for an estimated transfer fee of €4.5 million and immediately loaned him out to Lille with the latter having an option to purchase him in June 2017.

On 30 August 2021, he signed a three-year contract with Metz.

In January 2023 free agent De Preville joined 2. Bundesliga club 1. FC Kaiserslautern on a contract until the end of the 2022–23 season.

On 20 July 2023, De Preville joined Ligue 2 side Troyes, on a free transfer following his departure from 1. FC Kaiserslautern after his contract ended, on a two-year contract.

== Career statistics ==
=== Club ===
As of match played 10 May 2025

Appearances and goals by club, season and competition
| Club | Season | League | | | National cup | | League cup | | Europe | | Other | | Total | |
| Club | Season | Division | Apps | Goals | Apps | Goals | Apps | Goals | Apps | Goals | Apps | Goals | Apps | Goals |
|---|---|---|---|---|---|---|---|---|---|---|---|---|---|---|
| Istres | 2009–10 | Ligue 2 | 4 | 0 | 0 | 0 | 1 | 0 | — | | — | | 5 | 0 |
| Istres | 2010–11 | Ligue 2 | 13 | 0 | — | | — | | — | | — | | 13 | 0 |
| Istres | 2011–12 | Ligue 2 | 37 | 7 | 4 | 3 | 1 | 1 | — | | — | | 42 | 11 |
| Istres | 2012–13 | Ligue 2 | 16 | 5 | 0 | 0 | 1 | 0 | — | | — | | 17 | 5 |
| Istres | Total | | 70 | 12 | 4 | 3 | 3 | 1 | — | | — | | 77 | 16 |
| Reims | 2012–13 | Ligue 1 | 10 | 1 | — | | — | | — | | — | | 10 | 1 |
| Reims | 2013–14 | Ligue 1 | 32 | 5 | 1 | 0 | 2 | 0 | — | | — | | 35 | 5 |
| Reims | 2014–15 | Ligue 1 | 25 | 3 | 2 | 1 | 1 | 1 | — | | — | | 28 | 5 |
| Reims | 2015–16 | Ligue 1 | 36 | 6 | 1 | 1 | 1 | 0 | — | | — | | 38 | 7 |
| Reims | Total | | 103 | 15 | 4 | 2 | 4 | 1 | — | | — | | 111 | 18 |
| Lille (loan) | 2016–17 | Ligue 1 | 30 | 14 | 2 | 0 | 1 | 0 | — | | — | | 33 | 14 |
| Lille | 2017–18 | Ligue 1 | 4 | 2 | 0 | 0 | 0 | 0 | — | | — | | 4 | 2 |
| Bordeaux | 2017–18 | Ligue 1 | 29 | 4 | 1 | 0 | 1 | 0 | — | | — | | 31 | 4 |
| Bordeaux | 2018–19 | Ligue 1 | 23 | 3 | 1 | 0 | 1 | 0 | 9 | 1 | — | | 34 | 4 |
| Bordeaux | 2019–20 | Ligue 1 | 24 | 6 | 2 | 1 | 2 | 1 | — | | — | | 28 | 8 |
| Bordeaux | 2020–21 | Ligue 1 | 33 | 1 | 0 | 0 | — | | — | | — | | 33 | 1 |
| Bordeaux | Total | | 109 | 14 | 4 | 1 | 4 | 1 | 9 | 1 | 0 | 0 | 126 | 17 |
| Metz | 2021–22 | Ligue 1 | 27 | 5 | 0 | 0 | — | | — | | — | | 27 | 5 |
| 1. FC Kaiserslautern | 2022–23 | 2. Bundesliga | 10 | 1 | — | | — | | — | | — | | 10 | 1 |
| Troyes | 2023–24 | Ligue 2 | 17 | 2 | 0 | 0 | — | | — | | — | | 17 | 2 |
| Troyes | 2024–25 | Ligue 2 | 16 | 6 | 4 | 1 | — | | — | | — | | 20 | 7 |
| Troyes | Total | | 33 | 8 | 4 | 1 | — | | — | | — | | 37 | 9 |
| Career total | | | 386 | 71 | 18 | 7 | 12 | 3 | 9 | 1 | 0 | 0 | 425 | 82 |
