= Anthony Weber =

French footballer (born 1987)

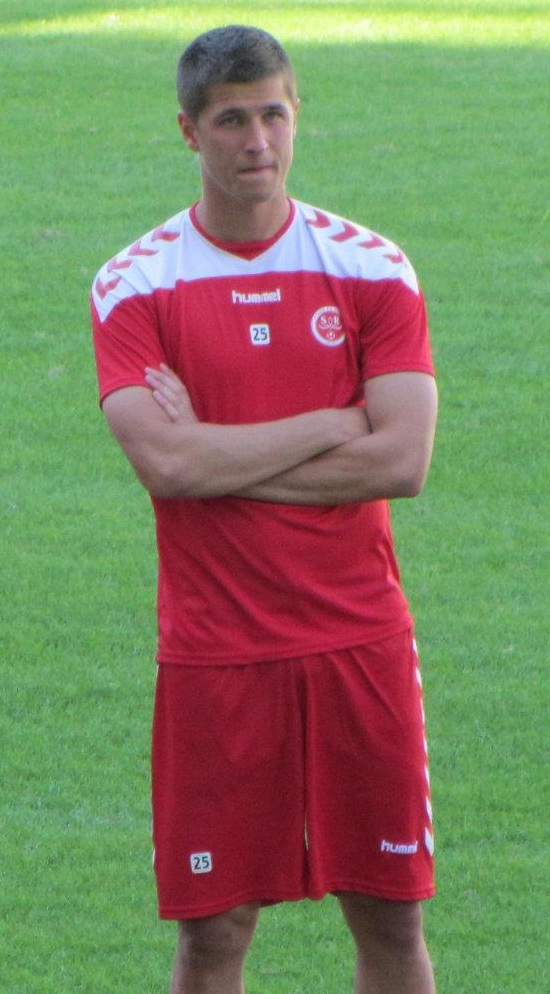
- Weber with Reims

Personal information
- Date of birth: 11 June 1987 (age 39)
- Place of birth: Strasbourg, France
- Height: 1.90 m (6 ft 3 in)
- Position: Centre-back

Team information
- Current team: Reims Sainte-Anne

Youth career
- 1992–1998: AS Educative Cité de l'Ill
- 1998–2007: Strasbourg

Senior career*
Years	Team	Apps	(Gls)
2007–2009	Strasbourg	4	(0)
2009	→ Paris (loan)	21	(2)
2009–2011	Paris	15	(1)
2011–2017	Reims	188	(7)
2017–2019	Brest	71	(3)
2019–2021	Caen	51	(1)
2021–	Reims Sainte-Anne	0	(0)
- * Club domestic league appearances and goals as of 08:10, 2 August 2019 (UTC)

Anthony Weber (born 11 June 1987) is a French professional footballer who plays as a centre-back for Reims Sainte-Anne.

== Career ==
Born and raised in Strasbourg, Weber started playing for his hometown's main football club, Strasbourg, at the age of 11. In 2006, he won the Coupe Gambardella with Strasbourg's U18 side, defeating Karim Benzema's Olympique Lyonnais in the final. He made his professional debut one year afterwards in a Ligue 2 game against Reims, entering as a substitute after Habib Bellaïd had been sent off. Weber did not see first team action the following season in Ligue 1 as he was barred by Bellaïd and Jean-Marc Furlan's new signings, Grégory Paisley and Pierre Ducrocq. For the 2008–09 season, Strasbourg was back in Ligue 2 and Weber started three league games in the first half of the season. During the winter transfer window, he was loaned to Paris FC, one division below, in order to gain some playing time.

== Profile ==
Weber is a solid, tall centre-back with good placement skills. He has been compared to Léonard Specht.
