= Mickaël Tacalfred =

Guadeloupean footballer (born 1981)

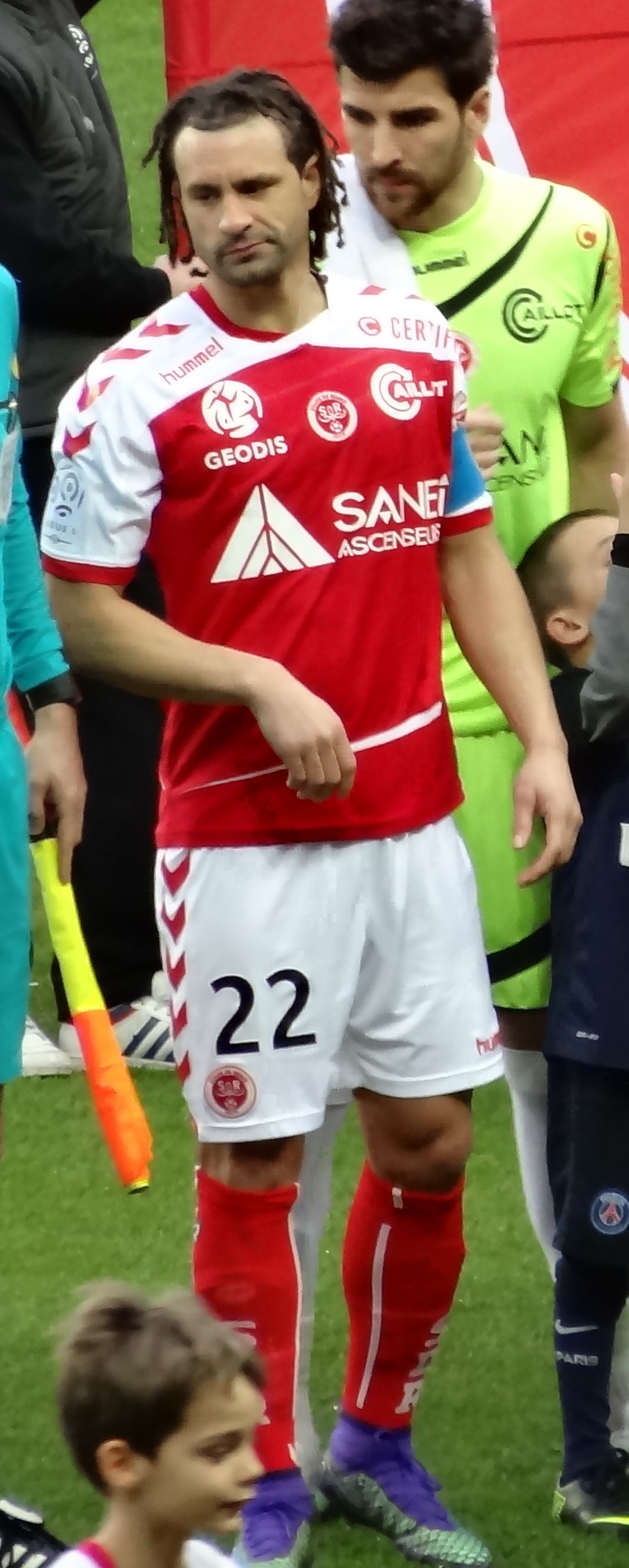
- Tacalfred with Reims in 2016

Personal information
- Date of birth: 23 April 1981 (age 45)
- Place of birth: Colombes, Hauts-de-Seine, France
- Height: 1.75 m (5 ft 9 in)
- Position: Defender

Team information
- Current team: Reims Sainte-Anne

Senior career*
Years	Team	Apps	(Gls)
2000–2001	Red Star	17	(0)
2001–2002	FC Martigues	28	(0)
2002–2003	Rouen	20	(0)
2003–2004	Angers	26	(2)
2004–2008	Dijon	129	(1)
2008–2016	Reims	235	(1)
2016–2019	Auxerre	89	(4)
2019–2020	Béziers	22	(1)
2021–	Reims Sainte-Anne	23	(2)

International career^{‡}
2007–	Guadeloupe	16	(0)
- * Club domestic league appearances and goals as of 4 May 2023 (UTC) ‡ National team caps and goals as of 11:27, 8 September 2020 (UTC)

Mickaël Tacalfred (born 23 April 1981) is a Guadeloupean professional footballer who plays as a defender for French side Reims Sainte-Anne. He appeared with the Guadeloupe national football team at the 2007 CONCACAF Gold Cup.

== Career ==
Tacalfred joined Béziers in summer 2019.

He retired from professional playing during the 2019–20 season which was stopped due to the COVID-19 pandemic.
