= Hugo Rodriguez (footballer, born 1991) =

French footballer

Personal information
- Date of birth: 2 April 1991 (age 35)
- Place of birth: Montpellier, France
- Height: 1.77 m (5 ft 10 in)
- Position: Midfielder

Senior career*
Years	Team	Apps	(Gls)
2008–2011	Montpellier	0	(0)
2011–2015	Arles-Avignon	89	(1)
2015–2017	Stade Reims	28	(0)
- * Club domestic league appearances and goals as of 20 July 2017 (UTC)

Hugo Rodriguez (born 2 April 1991) is a French professional footballer who last played as a midfielder for Stade Reims.
