= Mohamed Fofana (footballer, born March 1985) =

Malian footballer

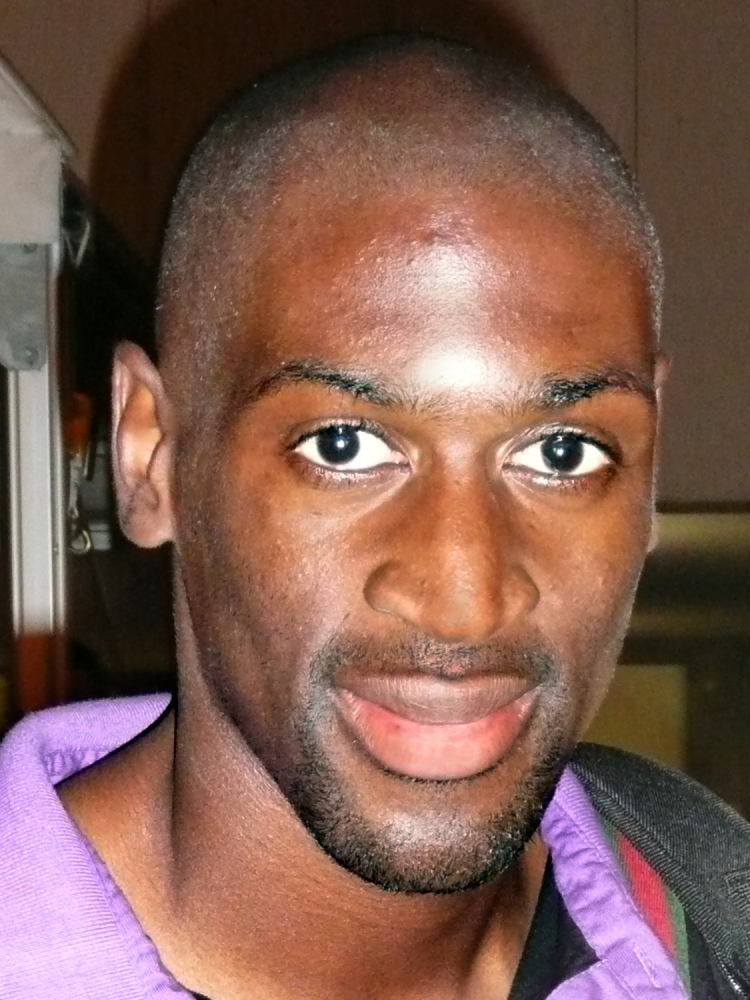

Personal information
- Full name: Mohamed Fofana
- Date of birth: 7 March 1985 (age 41)
- Place of birth: Gonesse, France
- Height: 1.81 m (5 ft 11 in)
- Position: Defender

Youth career
- 2000–2004: Toulouse

Senior career*
Years	Team	Apps	(Gls)
2004–2012	Toulouse	115	(2)
2012–2016	Reims	48	(1)
2013–2014	Reims B	5	(0)
2016–2018	Lens	2	(0)
2017–2018	Lens II	4	(0)
2024-2025	Fakirerpool	6	(0)

International career
2011–2014	Mali	5	(0)
- * Club domestic league appearances and goals

Mohamed Fofana (born 7 March 1985) is a former footballer who plays as a defender. Born in France, he represented Mali at international level.

== Career ==
Fofana spent eight years playing for Ligue 1 team Toulouse from the 2004–05 until the 2011–12 season. A highlight during his time with Toulouse was competing in 2007–08 UEFA Champions League qualifying.

On 2 August 2016, in his second league match for his new club RC Lens, a 2–2 draw against Tours, Fofana was red-carded. He was suspended for two matches.
