= Antoine Devaux =

French footballer (born 1985)

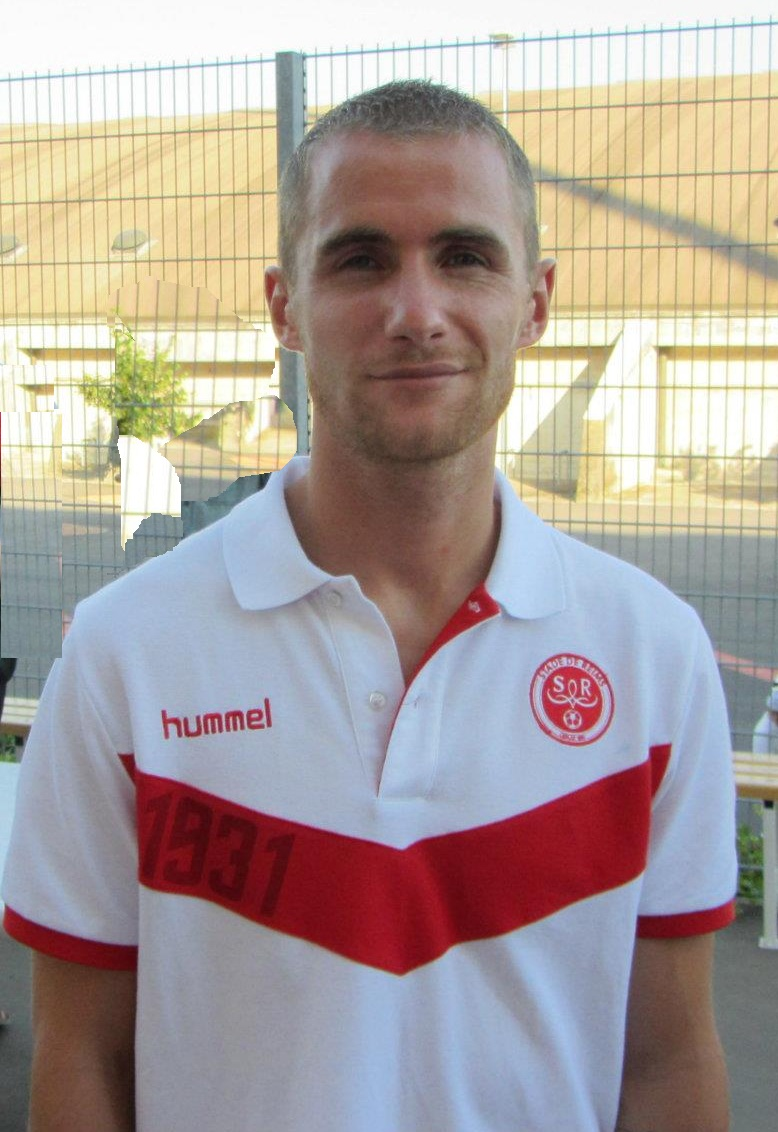

Personal information
- Date of birth: 21 February 1985 (age 41)
- Place of birth: Dieppe, France
- Height: 1.85 m (6 ft 1 in)
- Position: Midfielder

Senior career*
Years	Team	Apps	(Gls)
2004–2008	Le Havre	49	(1)
2007–2008	→ Gueugnon (loan)	4	(1)
2008–2009	Boulogne	27	(4)
2009–2012	Toulouse	31	(1)
2012–2018	Reims	145	(5)
2018	Tours FC	16	(2)
- * Club domestic league appearances and goals as of 12:26, 17 July 2018 (UTC)

Antoine Devaux (born 21 February 1985) is a French former professional footballer who played as a midfielder.

== Career ==
Born in Dieppe, Devaux began his career at Le Havre. In 2007, he joined Ligue 2 side FC Gueugnon, where he stayed just one season, before moving to US Boulogne. In 2009, Devaux left US Boulogne to sign a three-year deal with FC Toulouse.
