= EF Reims Sainte-Anne =

Association football club in France

Reims Sainte-Anne
- Full name: L'École de Sport Reims Sainte-Anne Carnot Châtillons
- Founded: 1974; 51 years ago
- Ground: Stade Robert Pirès
- League: National 3 Group I
- 2022–23: National 3 Group F, 8th

L'École de Sport Reims Sainte-Anne Carnot Châtillons, commonly known as Reims Sainte-Anne, is a football club founded in 1974 in Reims, France. As of the 2022–23 season, it competes in the Championnat National 3, the fifth tier of the French football league system. The club's home ground is the Stade Robert Pirès.

== History ==
EF Reims Sainte-Anne was founded in 1974.

In 2019, the club signed former Stade de Reims player Odaïr Fortes. In the 2021–22 Coupe de France, Reims Sainte-Anne was eliminated in the round of 64 by Stade de Reims after a 1–0 loss. At the end of the 2021–22 season, the club was promoted to the Championnat National 3.

== Notable players ==
- (France) Robert Pires (youth)
