= Olivier Guégan =

French footballer (born 1972)

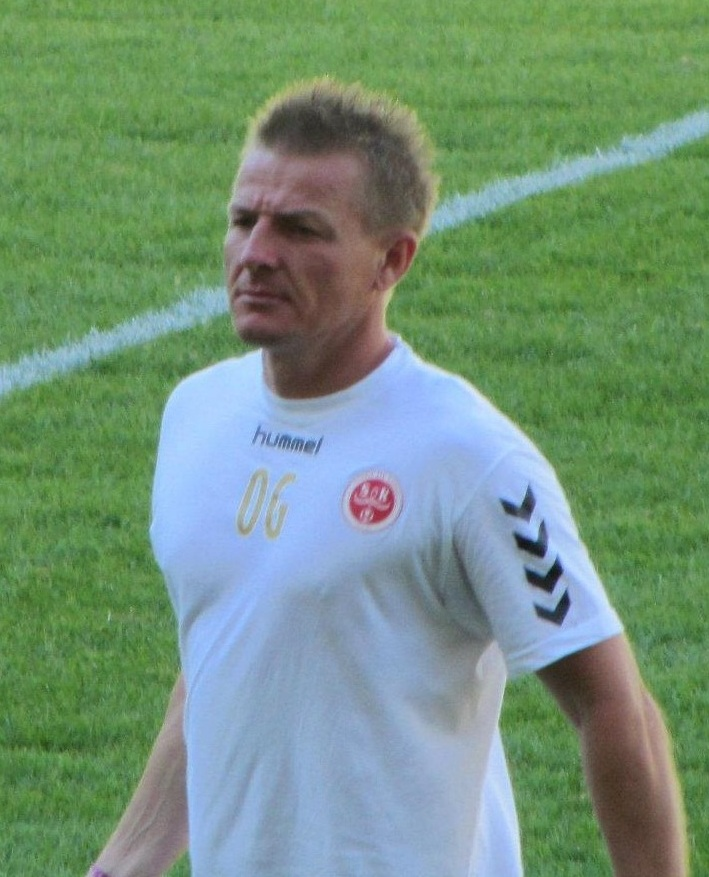

Personal information
- Date of birth: 20 August 1972 (age 54)
- Place of birth: Longjumeau, France
- Height: 1.72 m (5 ft 8 in)
- Position: Midfielder

Senior career*
Years	Team	Apps	(Gls)
1991–1994	Angers		
1997–1998	US Lusitanos Saint-Maur	29	(2)
1998–2000	Paris FC	63	(7)
2000–2001	Reims	31	(4)
2001–2004	Angers	96	(3)
2004–2009	Brest	144	(0)
2009–2010	Reims	32	(0)
Total		395	(16)

International career
2010	Brittany	2	(1)

Managerial career
- 2015–2016: Reims
- 2016–2018: Grenoble
- 2019–2021: Valenciennes
- 2022–2023: Sochaux
- * Club domestic league appearances and goals

Olivier Guégan (born 20 August 1972) is a French football manager and former player who most recently managed French Ligue 2 side Sochaux. During his playing career he played as a midfielder.

== Managerial career ==
In June 2014, he became the assistant coach at Stade de Reims. On 7 April 2015, Guégan became the new coach at Reims, after Jean-Luc Vasseur was sacked.

== Managerial statistics ==
As of match played 1 November 2021

Managerial record by team and tenure
Team	Nat	From	To	Record							
Team	Nat	From	To	G	W	D	L	GF	GA	GD	Win %
Reims	(France)	7 April 2015	23 April 2016	44	12	9	23	50	71	−21	27.27
Grenoble	(France)	21 June 2016	5 June 2018	75	43	21	11	125	51	+74	57.33
Valenciennes	(France)	6 June 2019	5 November 2021	87	31	23	33	98	115	−17	35.63
Sochaux	(France)	1 July 2022	17 May 2023	37	16	7	14	58	40	+18	43.24
Total				243	102	60	81	331	277	+54	41.98
