= Christopher Glombard =

Martiniquais footballer (born 1989)

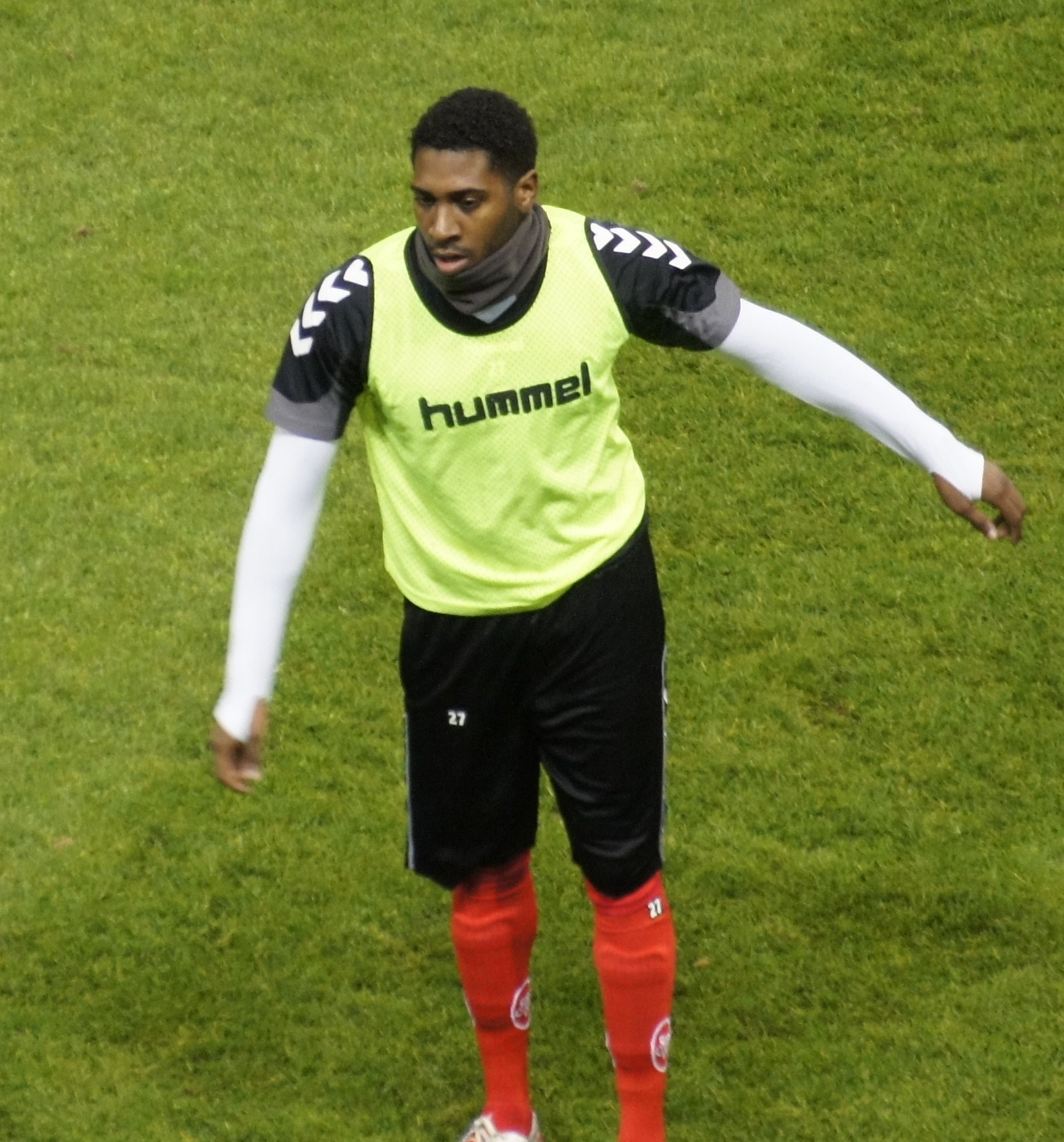

Personal information
- Full name: Christopher Glombard
- Date of birth: 5 June 1989 (age 37)
- Place of birth: Montreuil, France
- Height: 1.80 m (5 ft 11 in)
- Position: Right back

Team information
- Current team: Bassin d'Arcachon

Youth career
- 1999–2003: US Sevran
- 2003–2005: Clairefontaine
- 2005–2010: Bordeaux

Senior career*
Years	Team	Apps	(Gls)
2010–2011	Bordeaux	0	(0)
2010–2011	→ Reims (loan)	24	(0)
2011–2015	Reims	100	(5)
2015–2016	→ Paris FC (loan)	20	(0)
2017	Stade Lavallois	16	(0)
2018	Alki Oroklini	17	(0)
2018–2019	Tours	19	(0)
2019–2020	Ethnikos Achna	20	(0)
2021–	Bassin d'Arcachon		

International career^{‡}
2007	France U18	2	(0)
2007–2008	France U19	4	(0)
2014–	Martinique	4	(0)
- * Club domestic league appearances and goals as of 00:47, 10 June 2020 (UTC) ‡ National team caps and goals as of 9 July 2017

Christopher Glombard (born 5 June 1989) is a footballer who plays as a right back for Championnat National 3 club Bassin d'Arcachon. Born in France, and a former French youth international, he plays for the Martinique national team. Glombard is the younger brother of Luigi Glombard, who is also a football player and is now retired.

== Career ==
Prior to joining Reims on loan, Glombard was captain of the Bordeaux reserve team. On 28 May 2010, Bordeaux announced that the player would be joining Reims for the entire 2010–11 season alongside teammate Grzegorz Krychowiak. He made his professional debut on 13 August in a league match against Le Mans.
