= Diego Rigonato =

Brazilian footballer (born 1988)

Diego
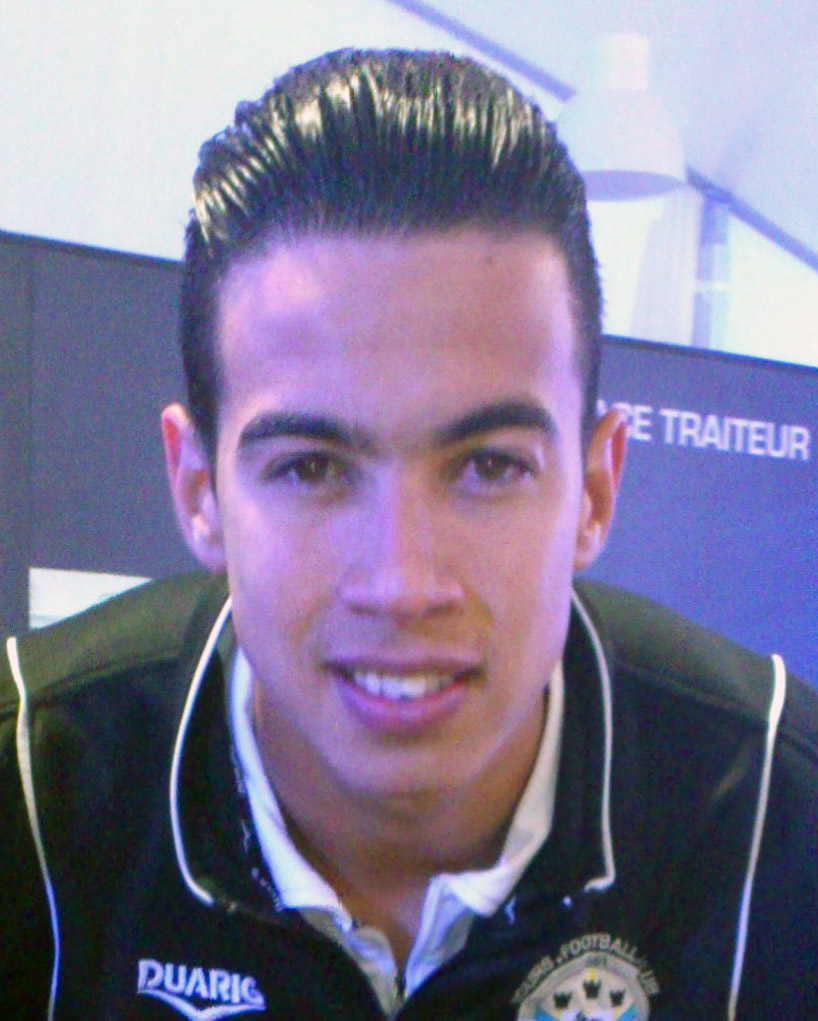
- Diego with Tours in 2012

Personal information
- Full name: Diego Rigonato Rodrigues
- Date of birth: 9 March 1988 (age 38)
- Place of birth: Americana, São Paulo, Brazil
- Height: 1.75 m (5 ft 9 in)
- Position: Midfielder

Youth career
- 1996–2000: Rio Branco
- 2000–2002: União Barbarense
- 2002–2004: São Paulo

Senior career*
Years	Team	Apps	(Gls)
2004–2005	Inter Korea		
2005–2006	Itararé		
2006–2010	Honvéd	76	(12)
2006–2010	Honvéd II	1	(0)
2010–2012	Tours	64	(13)
2012–2018	Reims	156	(26)
2012	Reims II	2	(0)
2018–2019	Al Dhafra	18	(3)
2019–2022	Toluca	45	(3)
2022	Ceará	7	(0)
- * Club domestic league appearances and goals as of 31 October 2022

Diego Rigonato Rodrigues (born 9 March 1988), commonly known as Diego, a Brazilian professional footballer who played as a left-back and midfielder until 2022.

== Career ==
=== Budapest Honved ===
Rodrigues made his debut of 27 November 2006 against Vasas SC in a match that ended 1–0.

=== Reims ===
Rodrigues helped Stade de Reims win the 2017–18 Ligue 2, helping promote them to the Ligue 1 for the 2018–19 season.

=== Toluca ===
Rodrigues was presented as Toluca's new signing on 25 July 2019.

== Career statistics ==
As of match played on 17 July 2018.

Appearances and goals by club, season and competition
Club	Season	League			Cup		League Cup		Other		Total	
Club	Season	Division	Apps	Goals	Apps	Goals	Apps	Goals	Apps	Goals	Apps	Goals
Honvéd	2008–09	Nemzeti Bajnokság I	?	5	0	0	—				?	5
Honvéd	2009–10	Nemzeti Bajnokság I	21	4	3	1	—		1	0	25	5
Honvéd	Total		21	9	4	1	0	0	1	0	25	10
Honvéd II	2010–11	Nemzeti Bajnokság II	1	0	—						1	0
Tours	2010–11	Ligue 2	27	4	0	0	—				27	4
Tours	2011–12	Ligue 2	32	9	2	0	2	0	—		36	9
Tours	2012–13	Ligue 2	5	0	0	0	1	0	—		6	0
Tours	Total		64	13	2	0	3	0	0	0	69	13
Reims	2012–13	Ligue 1	29	4	1	0	—				30	4
Reims	2013–14	Ligue 1	7	1	0	0	—				7	1
Reims	2014–15	Ligue 1	31	5	1	1	1	0	—		33	6
Reims	2015–16	Ligue 1	23	3	1	0	1	0	—		25	3
Reims	2016–17	Ligue 2	32	4	1	0	—				33	4
Reims	2017–18	Ligue 2	34	9	0	0	1	0	—		35	9
Reims	Total		156	26	4	1	3	0	0	0	163	27
Reims II	2013–14	CFA 2	2	0	—						2	0
Career total			244	48	9	2	6	0	1	0	261	50

== Honours ==
Honvéd

- Hungarian Cup: 2008–09
- Hungarian Cup runners-up: 2007–08
- Hungarian Super Cup runners-up: 2007, 2009

Reims

- Ligue 2: 2017–18
