= Franck Signorino =

French footballer (born 1981)

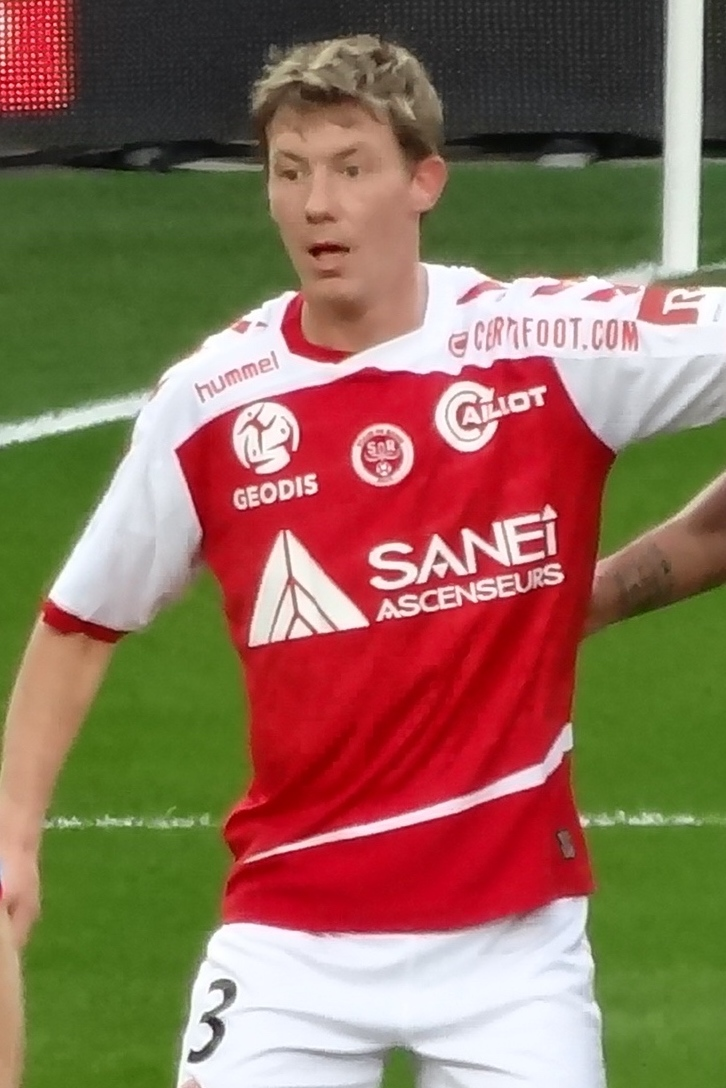
- Signorino in action for Reims in 2016

Personal information
- Full name: Franck Eddy Signorino
- Date of birth: 19 September 1981 (age 45)
- Place of birth: Nogent-sur-Marne, France
- Height: 1.75 m (5 ft 9 in)
- Position: Left-back

Youth career
- 1995–1996: INF Clairefontaine
- 1997–2001: Metz

Senior career*
Years	Team	Apps	(Gls)
2001–2005	Metz	144	(2)
2005–2007	Nantes	60	(1)
2007–2010	Getafe	5	(0)
2010	→ Cartagena (loan)	13	(0)
2010–2011	Charleroi	15	(0)
2011–2012	Laval	30	(0)
2012–2016	Reims	102	(1)
2016–2017	Metz	17	(0)
Total		386	(4)
- * Club domestic league appearances and goals

Franck Eddy Signorino (born 19 September 1981) is a French former professional footballer who played as a left-back.

== Career ==
Born in Nogent-sur-Marne, Val-de-Marne, Signorino made his professional debut with FC Metz, helping it return to Ligue 1 in his second year. After a final season where he paired up with Franck Ribéry, he signed for FC Nantes.

In 2007, following Nantes' relegation from the first division, a host of clubs, including Deportivo de La Coruña, Getafe CF, UD Almería, Birmingham City, and Newcastle United expressed an interest in the player. Eventually, Signorino moved to Getafe on 30 July 2007, making his competitive debut against Tottenham Hotspur in the group stage of the UEFA Cup following a period of injury (2–1 away win, 90 minutes played). His La Liga debut came on 16 December, featuring 67 minutes as a substitute in a 3–1 home defeat to Villarreal CF.

Signorino spent the entire 2008–09 campaign in the sidelines, nursing a serious tibia injury. In January 2010, after being demoted to third-string left-back, he signed with second division side FC Cartagena on loan; in the last minutes of the following summer transfer window he was cut by Getafe and, subsequently, joined S. du Pays de Charleroi on a one-year contract, appearing regularly for the Belgian team but suffering relegation from the Pro League.

On 5 September 2011, Signorino agreed to a one-year deal with Stade Lavallois, returning to his country after four years. He continued to compete in his country's top division in the following years, with Stade de Reims and Metz.

== Honours ==
Individual

- Ligue 1 Team of the Year: 2002–03
