= Atila Turan =

Footballer (born 1992)

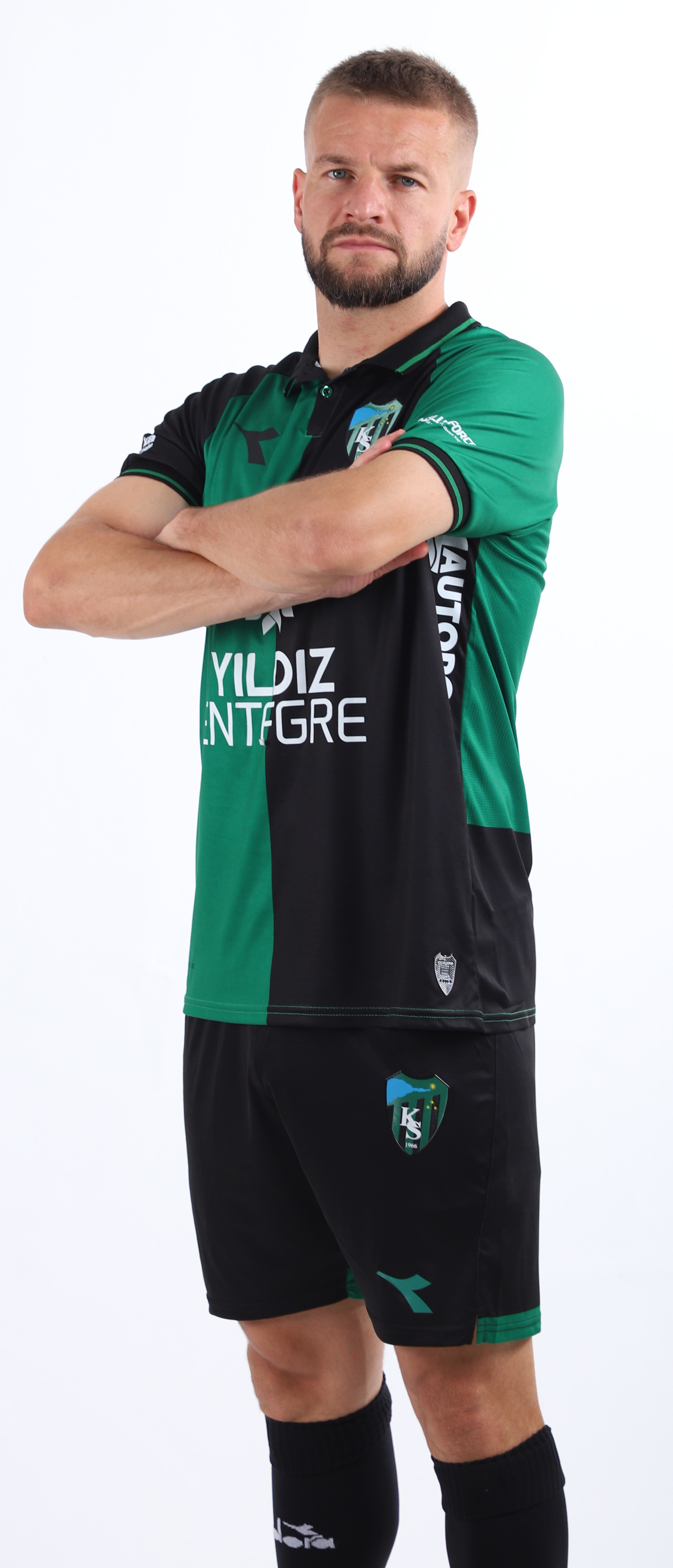
- Turan with Kocaelispor in 2023

Personal information
- Full name: Atila Turan
- Date of birth: 10 April 1992 (age 34)
- Place of birth: Migennes, France
- Height: 1.76 m (5 ft 9 in)
- Position: Left-back

Team information
- Current team: Çorum
- Number: 89

Youth career
- 1998–2006: Cheminotte de Migennes
- 2006–2008: Stade Auxerrois
- 2008–2010: Grenoble

Senior career*
Years	Team	Apps	(Gls)
2010–2011	Grenoble	22	(3)
2011–2013	Sporting CP B	1	(0)
2011–2012	→ Beira-Mar (loan)	6	(0)
2012–2013	→ Orduspor (loan)	21	(1)
2013–2017	Reims	41	(4)
2014–2015	→ Kasımpaşa (loan)	6	(0)
2017–2019	Kayserispor	57	(1)
2020–2021	Ankaragücü	37	(1)
2021–2024	Kocaelispor	83	(1)
2024–	Çorum	20	(0)

International career^{‡}
2007–2008	France U16	7	(0)
2008–2009	France U17	17	(0)
2009–2010	France U18	9	(0)
2010–2011	France U19	4	(1)
2013	Turkey U21	3	(0)
2017–	Turkey	2	(0)
- * Club domestic league appearances and goals as of 15 June 2025 ‡ National team caps and goals as of 19 May 2019

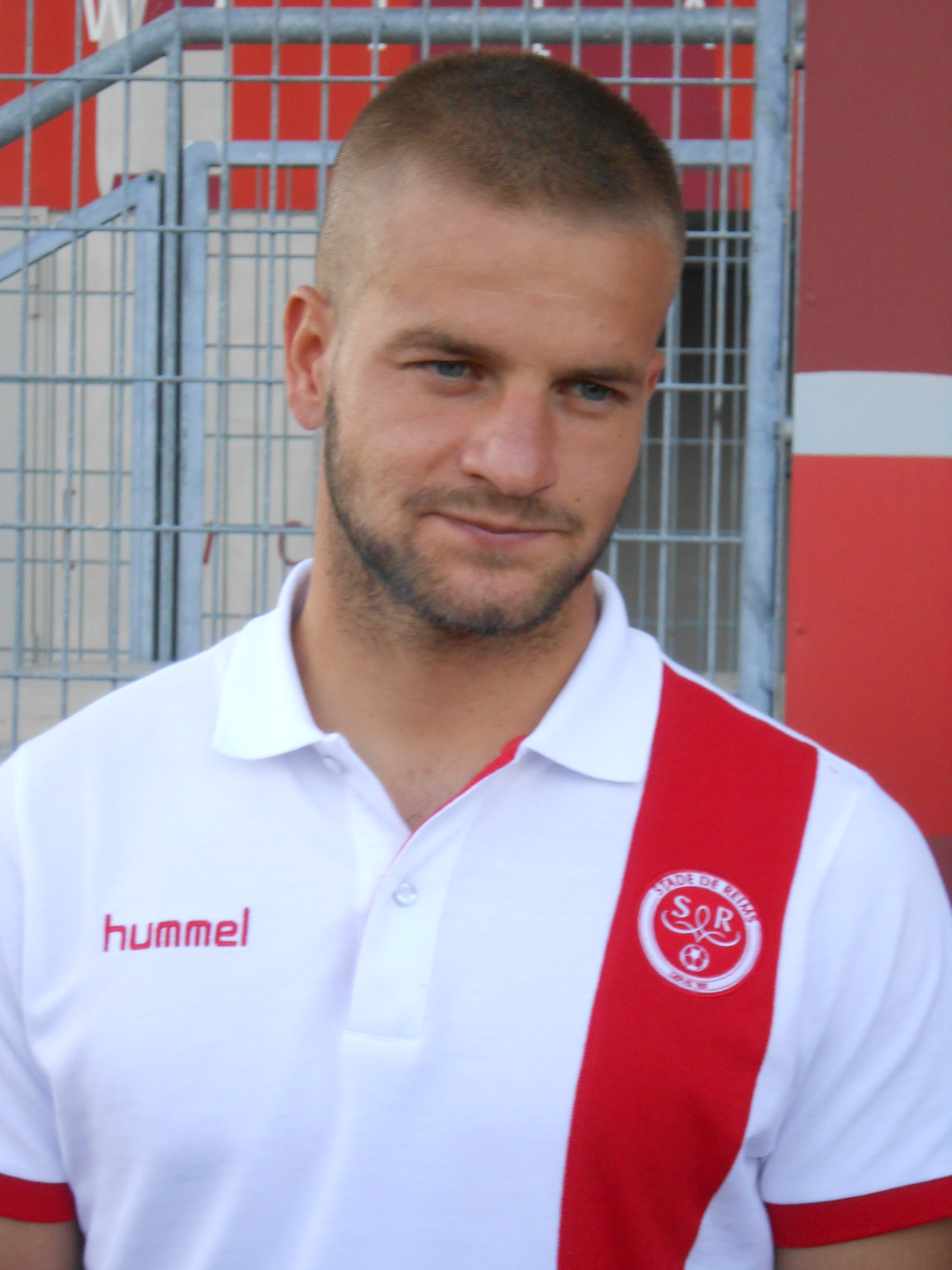
Turan with Reims in 2015

Atila Turan (born 10 April 1992) is a professional footballer who plays for Turkish TFF First League club Çorum. Born in France, he plays for the Turkey national team internationally, having played for France at youth international levels U16 through U19 before switching to the Turkey U21. He plays mainly as a left midfielder, but is also capable of playing as a left-back.

== Club career ==
=== Grenoble ===
Of Turkish origin, Turan was born in Migennes and played youth football for two amateur clubs in the Yonne department before securing a move to professional club Grenoble in July 2008. After three years in the club's youth academy, on 3 February 2010, he signed his first professional contract, agreeing to a three-year deal. Turan made his professional debut on 30 July 2010 in a 2–1 defeat to Guingamp in a Coupe de la Ligue match. He made his first Ligue 2 appearance the following week in a 1–0 win over Le Havre.

Turan scored his first professional goal on 29 October 2010, netting the equalizing goal in a 1–1 home draw against Ajaccio. A week later, he scored his second career goal in a 4–3 defeat to Châteauroux. Turan finished his debut campaign with 24 total appearances and three goals as Grenoble finished the season last, which led to a second consecutive relegation to the Championnat National, the third level of French football.

=== Sporting CP ===
Despite Grenoble's performance during the 2010–11 season, Turan earned individual praise for his performances and was, subsequently, scouted by several clubs abroad, most notably Spanish club Barcelona and Italian club Fiorentina. On 24 June 2011, Turan confirmed to Portuguese radio station Rádio Renascença that he was in negotiations with Sporting Clube de Portugal, however, due to the lengthy judicial process that led to the liquidation of Grenoble being in session, both the club and player were unable to further talks. A month later, after the liquidation of Grenoble was announced, the move was confirmed and Turan was introduced as a Sporting CP player. He signed a five-year contract with the Lisbon club, which included a minimum fee release clause of €30 million.

After failing to make a competitive appearance with Sporting, on 31 August 2011, Turan was loaned to fellow Primeira Liga team S.C. Beira-Mar until the end of the season. On 15 October, he made his debut for Beira-Mar in a 1–0 defeat to Marítimo in the Portuguese Cup. A week later, Turan made his league debut appearing as a substitute in a defeat to Benfica.

In June 2017 Turan joined Kayserispor.

== International career ==
Turan was a France youth international having earned caps at under-16, under-17, under-18, and under-19 level. With the under-17 team, he played at the 2009 UEFA European Under-17 Football Championship. In February 2013, he was called up to the Turkish under-21 team for a match against Norway.

Turan made his senior debut for the senior Turkey national team in a friendly –2-0 loss to Romania on 9 November 2017.

== Career statistics ==
=== Club ===
As of 16 March 2012

Appearances and goals by club, season and competition
Club	Season	League			Cup (Note: Includes Coupe de France, Coupe de la Ligue, Trophée des Champions, Taça de Portugal, Taça da Liga, and Supertaça Cândido de Oliveira matches)		Europe (Note: Includes UEFA Supercup)		Total	
Club	Season	Division	Apps	Goals	Apps	Goals	Apps	Goals	Apps	Goals
Grenoble	2010–11	Ligue 2	22	3	2	0	—		24	3
Sporting CP	2011–12	Primeira Liga	0	0	0	0	0	0	0	0
Beira-Mar (loan)	2011–12	Primeira Liga	6	0	2	0	—		8	0
Career total			28	3	4	0	0	0	32	3
