= Alexi Peuget =

French footballer (born 1990)

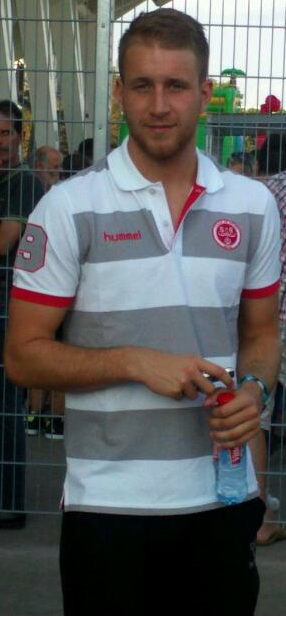

Personal information
- Full name: Alexi Peuget
- Date of birth: 18 December 1990 (age 35)
- Place of birth: Mulhouse, France
- Height: 1.87 m (6 ft 2 in)
- Position: Defensive midfielder

Team information
- Current team: Rumilly-Vallières
- Number: 20

Youth career
- 1996–2007: Jura Sud
- 2007–2010: Strasbourg

Senior career*
Years	Team	Apps	(Gls)
2010–2011	Strasbourg	25	(2)
2011–2017	Reims	37	(2)
2013–2017	Reims B	17	(3)
2014	→ Châteauroux (loan)	15	(1)
2017–2018	Grenoble	3	(0)
2018–2019	Jura Sud	23	(2)
2019–2020	Saint-Malo	19	(2)
2020–	Rumilly-Vallières	16	(0)
- * Club domestic league appearances and goals as of 00:12, 28 April 2022 (UTC)

Alexi Peuget (born 18 December 1990) is a French professional footballer who plays as a defensive midfielder for Championnat National 1 club Rumilly-Vallières, where he is the captain.

== Career ==
In his final season with Strasbourg, Peuget reached the senior team and made 25 appearances scoring two goals in the 2010–11 season. Due to Strasbourg entering liquidation in the 2011 off-season, Peuget was a part of a mass clear-out, which resulted in his move to Reims.

On 30 June 2019, Saint-Malo confirmed that Peuget had joined the club. In 2020, he signed for Rumilly-Vallières. He captained the side that made the semi-finals of the Coupe de France in the 2020–21 season, where he was the sole goalscorer for the club in a 5–1 loss to Monaco.

== Personal life ==
Alexi's father is former Mulhouse player Jean-Michel Peuget, and he also has a younger brother who played in the youth academy of Auxerre.
