= 2023–24 AJ Auxerre season =

AJ Auxerre
2023–24 season
- Manager: Christophe Pélissier
- Stadium: Stade de l'Abbé-Deschamps
- Ligue 2: 1st (promoted)
- Coupe de France: Round of 64
- Top goalscorer: League: Ado Onaiwu (12); All: Ado Onaiwu (12)
- Highest home attendance: 17,101 v Concarneau (17 May 2024, Ligue 2)
- Lowest home attendance: 12,010 v Annecy (26 Sept 2023, Ligue 2)
- Average home league attendance: 14,936
- Biggest win: 4–0 v Annecy (Home, 26 Sept 2023, Ligue 2); 4–0 v Laval (Away, 23 Apr 2024, Ligue 2)
- Biggest defeat: 0–2 v Rodez (Away, 20 Apr 2024, Ligue 2)
Home colours	Away colours	Third colours

The 2023–24 season was AJ Auxerre's 119th season in existence and first one back in the Ligue 2. They also competed in the Coupe de France.

On 10 May 2024, Auxerre secured promotion immediately to the Ligue 1.

== Players ==
=== First-team squad ===
As of 17 October 2023

Note: Flags indicate national team as defined under FIFA eligibility rules; some limited exceptions apply. Players may hold more than one non-FIFA nationality.

No.	Pos.	Nation	Player
2	DF	FRA	Colin Dagba (on loan from PSG)
4	DF	BRA	Jubal
5	DF	FRA	Théo Pellenard
6	DF	MAR	Saad Agouzoul
7	FW	FRA	Gauthier Hein
8	MF	FRA	Nathan Buayi-Kiala (on loan from Parma)
10	FW	FRA	Gaëtan Perrin
11	FW	NED	Eros Maddy
13	DF	FRA	Clément Akpa
14	DF	GHA	Gideon Mensah
16	GK	GUF	Donovan Léon
17	FW	MLI	Lassine Sinayoko

No.	Pos.	Nation	Player
18	MF	SEN	Assane Dioussé
19	FW	FRA	Florian Ayé
24	DF	FRA	Ange Loïc N’Gatta
26	DF	FRA	Paul Joly
28	FW	GUI	Ousmane Camara
30	GK	MAD	Sonny Laiton
35	MF	FRA	Kévin Danois
37	GK	FRA	Raphaël Adiceam
40	GK	MTQ	Théo De Percin
42	MF	GHA	Elisha Owusu
45	FW	JPN	Ado Onaiwu
97	MF	MAD	Rayan Raveloson

== Transfers ==
=== In ===
Pos.	Player	Transferred from	Fee	Date	Source
FW	(France) Florian Ayé	(Italy) Brescia	€1,500,000	31 July 2023	
MF	(Senegal) Assane Dioussé	(Greece) OFI	€500,000	10 August 2023	
FW	(Japan) Ado Onaiwu	(France) Toulouse	€700,000	28 August 2023	
MF	(Senegal) Issa Soumaré	(France) Le Havre	Loan	12 January 2024	

=== Out ===
Pos.	Player	Transferred to	Fee	Date	Source
DF	(Guinea) Julian Jeanvier	Released		1 July 2023	
FW	(Senegal) M'Baye Niang	(Turkey) Adana Demirspor	Free	9 August 2023	
FW	(Cape Verde) Nuno da Costa	(Turkey) Kasımpaşa	Free	12 September 2023	
MF	(Morocco) Hamza Sakhi	(Australia) Melbourne City	Undisclosed	11 January 2024	
FW	(Guinea) Ousmane Camara	(France) Annecy		24 January 2024	

== Pre-season and friendlies ==
Win Draw Loss

== Competitions ==
=== Overall record ===
Competition	First match	Last match	Starting round	Final position	Record							
Competition	First match	Last match	Starting round	Final position	Pld	W	D	L	GF	GA	GD	Win %
Ligue 2	5 August 2023	17 May 2024	Matchday 1	Winners	38	21	11	6	72	36	+36	55.26
Coupe de France	18 November 2023	6 January 2024	Seventh round	Round of 64	3	1	2	0	4	1	+3	33.33
Total					41	22	13	6	76	37	+39	53.66

Source: Soccerway

=== Ligue 2 ===
==== League table ====
Pos	Team	Pld	W	D	L	GF	GA	GD	Pts	Promotion or Relegation
1	Auxerre (C, P)	38	21	11	6	72	36	+36	74	Promotion to Ligue 1
2	Angers (P)	38	20	8	10	56	42	+14	68	Promotion to Ligue 1
3	Saint-Étienne (O, P)	38	19	8	11	48	31	+17	65	Qualification for promotion play-offs final
4	Rodez	38	16	12	10	62	51	+11	60	Qualification for promotion play-offs semi-final
5	Paris FC	38	16	11	11	49	42	+7	59	Qualification for promotion play-offs semi-final

Updated to match(es) played on 17 May 2024. Source: Ligue 2
Rules for classification: 1) Points; 2) Goal difference; 3) Number of goals scored; 4) Head-to-head goal difference; 5) Fair play points
(C) Champions; (O) Play-off winners; (P) Promoted

==== Results summary ====
Overall								Home						Away					
Pld	W	D	L	GF	GA	GD	Pts	W	D	L	GF	GA	GD	W	D	L	GF	GA	GD
38	21	11	6	72	36	+36	74	12	5	2	39	14	+25	9	6	4	33	22	+11

==== Results by round ====
Round	1	2	3	4	5	6	7	8	9	10	11	12	13	14	15	16	17	18	19	20	21	22	23	24	25	26	27	28	29	30	31	32	33	34	35	36	37	38
Ground	A	H	A	H	A	H	A	H	H	A	A	H	A	H	A	H	A	H	A	H	A	H	A	H	A	H	H	A	H	A	H	A	A	H	A	H	A	H
Result	W	L	D	D	W	D	W	W	W	W	D	L	L	W	D	W	W	W	W	W	D	D	D	W	W	D	D	L	W	W	W	L	L	W	W	W	D	W
Position	2	9	8	9	5	6	5	3	3	2	3	4	4	3	4	3	3	2	2	1	2	1	2	1	1	1	1	1	1	1	1	1	1	1	1	1	1	1

A = Away; H = Home; W = Win; D = Draw; L = Loss

==== Matches ====
The league fixtures were unveiled on 29 June 2023.

5 August 2023 1	Valenciennes	1–4	Auxerre	Valenciennes
	Buatu 22'; Cuffaut (yellow card) 45'	Report	Camara 18', 61'; Akpa (yellow card) 46'; Hein 70', 79'	Stadium: Stade du Hainaut; Attendance: 6,259; Referee: Faouzi Benchabane

12 August 2023 2	Auxerre	0–1	Amiens	Auxerre
		Report	Kakuta 47'; Mafouta (yellow card) 61'	Stadium: Stade de l'Abbé-Deschamps; Attendance: 14,682; Referee: Olivier Thual

19 August 2023 3	Angers	2–2	Auxerre	Angers
19:00	Abdelli (yellow card) 5'; Diony 45+1'; Nadje 62'; Mendy (yellow card) 79'; Capelle (yellow card) 86'	Report	Perrin 17'; Joly (red card) 20'; Hein 75'	Stadium: Stade Raymond Kopa; Attendance: 5,906; Referee: Abdelatif Kherradji

26 August 2023 4	Auxerre	0–0	Grenoble	Auxerre
	Jubal (yellow card) 15'; Owusu (yellow card) 61'	Report	Paquiez (yellow card) 25'; Thio (yellow card) 90+2'	Stadium: Stade de l'Abbé-Deschamps; Attendance: 13,797; Referee: Karim Abed

2 September 2023 5	Bordeaux	2–4	Auxerre	Bordeaux
	Díaz 26'; Michelin (yellow card) 40'; Elis 83'; Bokele (yellow card) 84'	Report	Jubal 33'; Ayé 36', 59'; Mensah (yellow card) 45+3'; Owusu (yellow card) 45+4'; Hein 56'	Stadium: Matmut Atlantique; Attendance: 26,771; Referee: Mikael Lesage

16 September 2023 6	Auxerre	2–2	Pau	Auxerre
	Hein 13'; Pellenard (yellow card) 53'; Onaiwu 84'; Jubal (yellow card) 87'	Report	Ruiz 22'; Sylla 58'; Saivet (yellow card) 64'; Kamara (yellow card) 87'; Boto (yellow card) 90+6'	Stadium: Stade de l'Abbé-Deschamps; Attendance: 13,254; Referee: Nicolas Rainville

23 September 2023 7	Troyes	1–2	Auxerre	Troyes
15:00	Saïd (yellow card) 32'; Assoumou 75'; Ndiaye (yellow card) 89'	Report	Ndiaye 21' (o.g.); Mensah (yellow card) 38'; Sinayoko (yellow card) 73'; Owusu 90+1'	Stadium: Stade de l'Aube; Attendance: 9,055; Referee: Aurélien Petit

26 September 2023 8	Auxerre	4–0	Annecy	Auxerre
20:45	Mouanga 21' (o.g.); Ayé 29'; Perrin 85'; Raveloson 87'	Report	Lajugie (yellow card) 63'	Stadium: Stade de l'Abbé-Deschamps; Attendance: 12,010; Referee: Olivier Thual

30 September 2023 9	Auxerre	3–1	Rodez	Auxerre
19:00	Hein 33'; Mensah (yellow card) 55'; Perrin 72'; Raveloson 90+5'	Report	Corredor (yellow card) 6', (goal) 90+5'; Younoussa (yellow card) 51'; Haag (yellow card) 70'	Stadium: Stade de l'Abbé-Deschamps; Attendance: 14,421; Referee: Faouzi Benchabane

7 October 2023 10	Paris FC	0–2	Auxerre	Paris
CET (UTC+1)	Hamel (yellow card) 62'; Kolodziejczak (yellow card) 68'	Report	Sinayoko 22'; Raveloson (penalty missed) 70'; Onaiwu 70'	Stadium: Stade Sébastien Charléty; Attendance: 9,729; Referee: Guillaume Paradis

21 October 2023 11	Caen	1–1	Auxerre	Caen
CET (UTC+1)	Ntim (yellow card) 42'; Ayé 52' (o.g.)	Report	Abdi 6' (o.g.); Jubal (yellow card) 40'	Stadium: Stade Michel d'Ornano; Attendance: 17,917; Referee: Jérémie Pignard

28 October 2023 12	Auxerre	0–1	Dunkerque	Auxerre
	Pellenard (yellow card) 78'	Report	Koumetio (yellow card) 38'; Bardeli (yellow card) 78'; Boissier (yellow card) 88', (goal) 90+6'	Stadium: Stade de l'Abbé-Deschamps; Attendance: 15,514; Referee: Ahmed Taleb

6 November 2023 13	Guingamp	2–1	Auxerre	Guingamp
20:45 CET (UTC+1)	Gomis (yellow card) 46'; Pellenard 51' (o.g.); Guillaume (yellow card) 70'; Sagna (yellow card) 71'; Sivis (yellow card) 73' (red card) 90+6'; Sidibé (yellow card) 77'; El Ouazzani 80'; Courtet (yellow card) 90+10'	Report	Camara (yellow card) 17'; Perrin 72'; Agouzoul (yellow card) 78'; Raveloson (red card) 90+6'; Pellenard (yellow card) 90+10'	Stadium: Stade de Roudourou; Attendance: 6,850; Referee: Pierre Legat

11 November 2023 14	Auxerre	5–2	Saint-Étienne	Auxerre
19:00 CET (UTC+1)	Onaiwu 3', 36', 66'; Perrin 21'; Dioussé (yellow card) 45+5'; Sinayoko 82'	Report	Cafaro 31'; Bouchouari (yellow card) 45+5'; Tardieu (yellow card) 62'; Bentayg 80'	Stadium: Stade de l'Abbé-Deschamps; Attendance: 16,806; Referee: Benjamin Lepaysant

25 November 2023 15	Bastia	0–0	Auxerre	Furiani
19:00 CET (UTC+1)	Dramé (yellow card) 32'; Placide (yellow card) 76'	Report	Mensah (yellow card) 38'; Onaiwu (yellow card) 75'	Stadium: Stade Armand-Cesari; Attendance: 10,427; Referee: Willy Delajod

2 December 2023 16	Auxerre	3–2	Quevilly-Rouen	Auxerre
19:00 CET (UTC+1)	Perrin 45+1'; Sinayoko 55'; Onaiwu 65'; Hein (yellow card) 90+4'	Report	Sangaré (yellow card) 23'; Gbelle 35'; Soumano 40'	Stadium: Stade de l'Abbé-Deschamps; Attendance: 13,430; Referee: Romain Delpech

5 December 2023 17	Concarneau	1–2	Auxerre	Brest
20:45 CET (UTC+1)	Lebeau (yellow card) 87'; Mouazan 89'	Report	Perrin 16'; Jubal 38'; Sinayoko (yellow card) 55'; Akpa (yellow card) 73'	Stadium: Stade Francis-Le Blé; Attendance: 1,570; Referee: Azzédine Souifi

16 December 2023 18	Auxerre	2–0	Ajaccio	Auxerre
CET (UTC+1)	Hein 18', 29'	Report	Chanot (yellow card) 23' (yellow-red card) 45+2'; Mangani (yellow card) 45+1'	Stadium: Stade de l'Abbé-Deschamps; Attendance: 15,031; Referee: Nicolas Rainville

19 December 2023 19	Laval	1–3	Auxerre	Laval
CET (UTC+1)	Cherni 28'; Vargas (yellow card) 67'	Report	Sinayoko (yellow card) 17', (goal) 59'; Onaiwu 32'; Jubal (yellow card) 56'; Hein 69'	Stadium: Stade Francis Le Basser; Attendance: 8,793; Referee: Rémi Landry

15 January 2024 20	Auxerre	3–1	Bordeaux	Auxerre
CET (UTC+1)	Ayé 25', 88'; Ihnatenko 47' (o.g.)	Report	Vipotnik 45'; Ihnatenko (yellow card) 76'; Marcelin (yellow card) 79'; Weissbeck (yellow card) 85'	Stadium: Stade de l'Abbé-Deschamps; Attendance: 13,312; Referee: Benoît Bastien

23 January 2024 21	Grenoble	1–1	Auxerre	Grenoble
CET (UTC+1)	Ba 7' (pen.); Joseph (yellow card) 29'; Paquiez (yellow card) 45+1'	Report	Ayé 3'; Akpa (yellow card) 59'	Stadium: Stade des Alpes; Attendance: 6,017; Referee: Gaël Angoula

27 January 2024 22	Auxerre	1–1	Guingamp	Auxerre
	Ayé 11'; Hein (yellow card) 82'	Report	Merghem 36'; Luvambo (yellow card) 82'; Louiserre (yellow card) 82'	Stadium: Stade de l'Abbé-Deschamps; Attendance: 13,667; Referee: Mikael Lesage

3 February 2024 23	Pau	2–2	Auxerre	Pau
	Kouassi (yellow card) 38'; Boutaïb 40', 49'	Report	Onaiwu 2'; Jubal 64' (pen.); Mensah (yellow card) 84'; Léon (yellow card) 90+7'	Stadium: Nouste Camp; Attendance: 3,703; Referee: Mickaël Leleu

10 February 2024 24	Auxerre	1–0	Angers	Auxerre
	Owusu (yellow card) 33' (yellow-red card) 36'; Jubal 90+1' (pen.)	Report	Lepaul (yellow card) 27'; Raolisoa (yellow card) 90+2'	Stadium: Stade de l'Abbé-Deschamps; Attendance: 16,732; Referee: Mathieu Vernice

17 February 2024 25	Annecy	0–2	Auxerre	Annecy
	Soukouna (yellow card) 26'; Demoncy (yellow card) 64'	Report	Ayé 12'; Perrin (yellow card) 39'; Mensah (yellow card) 60'; Soumaré (red card) 80'; Sinayoko 82'	Stadium: Parc des Sports; Attendance: 5,416; Referee: Azzédine Souifi

24 February 2024 26	Auxerre	1–1	Bastia	Auxerre
	Jubal 38'	Report	Souboul (yellow card) 37'; Santelli (yellow card) 77'; Alfarela 89'	Stadium: Stade de l'Abbé-Deschamps; Attendance: 14,716; Referee: Jérémy Stinat

2 March 2024 27	Auxerre	0–0	Valenciennes	Auxerre
	Owusu (yellow card) 45+3'; Hein (yellow card) 61'	Report	Oyewusi (yellow card) 39'; Louchet (yellow card) 57'; Masson (yellow card) 61'; El Amri (red card) 90+1'; Blanquart (yellow card) 90+3'	Stadium: Stade de l'Abbé-Deschamps; Attendance: 15,058; Referee: Abdelatif Kherradji

9 March 2024 28	Saint-Étienne	1–0	Auxerre	Saint-Étienne
	Batubinsika (yellow card) 24'; Cardona 55'; Nadé (yellow card) 68'	Report	Hein (yellow card) 9'; Pellenard (yellow card) 78'; Jubal (yellow card) 85'	Stadium: Stade Geoffroy-Guichard; Attendance: 36,277; Referee: Olivier Thual

16 March 2024 29	Auxerre	2–1	Caen	Auxerre
	Raveloson 76'; Hein (yellow card) 76'; Jubal 82'	Report	Kyeremeh 10'; Lebreton (yellow card) 38'	Stadium: Stade de l'Abbé-Deschamps; Attendance: 14,964; Referee: Rémi Landry

1 April 2024 30	Ajaccio	0–1	Auxerre	Ajaccio
	Ibayi (yellow card) 15'; Touré (yellow card) 86'	Report	Avinel 27' (o.g.); Akpa (yellow card) 45+2'; Agouzoul (yellow card) 61'	Stadium: Stade Michel Moretti; Attendance: 6,607; Referee: Benoît Millot

8 April 2024 31	Auxerre	2–0	Troyes	Auxerre
	Onaiwu 50' (pen.); Agouzoul (yellow card) 59'; Sinayoko 70'; Mensah (yellow card) 90+3'	Report	Chavalerin (yellow card) 56'; Tahrat (yellow card) 64'	Stadium: Stade de l'Abbé-Deschamps; Attendance: 15,667; Referee: Benoît Bastien

13 April 2024 32	Quevilly-Rouen	4–3	Auxerre	Le Petit-Quevilly
	Coulibaly 8', (yellow card) 80'; Pierret 66'; Camara 90+2'; Cissé (yellow card) 90+6'; Yade 90+10'	Report	Hein 31', (yellow card) 56'; Onaiwu 58', 90+5'; Raveloson (yellow card) 90+6'; Soumaré (red card) 90+7'	Stadium: Stade Robert Diochon; Attendance: 4,734; Referee: Faouzi Benchabane

20 April 2024 33	Rodez	2–0	Auxerre	Rodez
	Danger 56' (pen.), (yellow card) 73'; Akpa 80' (o.g.); Arconte (yellow card) 80'	Report		Stadium: Stade Paul-Lignon; Attendance: 3,263; Referee: Florent Batta

23 April 2024 34	Auxerre	4–0	Laval	Auxerre
20:45 CET (UTC+1)	Lomami 4' (o.g.); Ayé 13', 33'; Jubal (yellow card) 67'; Danois 90'	Report	Bobichon (red card) 45+2'	Stadium: Stade de l'Abbé-Deschamps; Attendance: 16,698; Referee: Romain Lissorgue

29 April 2024 35	Dunkerque	1–3	Auxerre	Dunkirk
20:45	Yassine 20'	Report	Sinayoko 57'; Courtet 61' (o.g.); Raveloson 71'	Stadium: Stade Marcel-Tribut; Attendance: 4,933; Referee: Mathieu Vernice

4 May 2024 36	Auxerre	2–0	Paris FC	Auxerre
15:00	Sinayoko 22'; Onaiwu 57'	Report	Marchetti (yellow card) 22'; Kebbal (yellow card) 44'; Dicko (yellow card) 67'	Stadium: Stade de l'Abbé-Deschamps; Attendance: 16,821; Referee: Aurélien Petit

10 May 2024 37	Amiens	0–0	Auxerre	Amiens
20:45	Kaïboué (yellow card) 69'; Mafouta (penalty missed) 72'	Report	Agouzoul (yellow card) 23'; Joly (yellow card) 27'	Stadium: Stade de la Licorne; Attendance: 12,377; Referee: Abdelatif Kherradji

17 May 2024 38	Auxerre	4–1	Concarneau	Auxerre
20:45	Onaiwu 40', 63', 80'; Hein 85'	Report	Moussiti-Oko 21'	Stadium: Stade de l'Abbé-Deschamps; Attendance: 17,101; Referee: Nicolas Rainville

=== Coupe de France ===
18 November 2023 Seventh round	Le Pays du Valois	0–0 (2–4 p)	Auxerre	Chambly
14:00 CET (UTC+1)	Lopes (yellow card) 39'; Dosso (yellow card) 42'; So (yellow card) 77'	Report		Stadium: Stade Walter Luzi; Referee: Thierry Bouillé

9 December 2023 Eighth round	Saint-Meziery	1–4	Auxerre	Troyes
17:00 CET (UTC+1)	Battais 40'; Naudot (red card) 44'; Blanchet (yellow card) 52'	Report	Danois 9'; Ayé 22', 45' (pen.); Sinayoko 75'	Stadium: Stade de l'Aube; Referee: Mickaël Leleu

6 January 2024 Round of 64	Nice	0–0 (4–2 p)	Auxerre	Nice
20:45 CET (UTC+1)	Rosario (yellow card) 89'	Report	Jubal (yellow card) 17'	Stadium: Allianz Riviera; Attendance: 20,973; Referee: Eric Wattellier
	Penalties
	Guessand (penalty missed); Moffi (penalty scored); Rosario (penalty scored); Lotomba (penalty scored); Laborde (penalty scored)		(penalty scored) Jubal; (penalty scored) Raveloson; (penalty missed) Onaiwu; (penalty missed) Perrin
