= 2021–22 AJ Auxerre season =

AJ Auxerre
2021–22 season
- Owner: James Zhou
- Head coach: Jean-Marc Furlan
- Stadium: Stade de l'Abbé-Deschamps
- Ligue 2: 3rd (promoted via play-off)
- Coupe de France: Round of 64
- Top goalscorer: League: Gaëtan Charbonnier (17); All: Gaëtan Charbonnier (17)
Home colours	Away colours

The 2021–22 season was the 117th season in the existence of AJ Auxerre and the club's 10th consecutive season in the second division of French football. In addition to the domestic league, Auxerre participated in this season's edition of the Coupe de France.

== Players ==
=== First-team squad ===
Note: Flags indicate national team as defined under FIFA eligibility rules; some limited exceptions apply. Players may hold more than one non-FIFA nationality.

No.	Pos.	Nation	Player
2	DF	HAI	Carlens Arcus
3	DF	FRA	Quentin Bernard
4	DF	BRA	Jubal Jr.
5	DF	FRA	Théo Pellenard
6	MF	FRA	Aly Ndom
7	FW	FRA	Gauthier Hein
8	MF	FRA	Ousoumane Camara
10	FW	FRA	Gaëtan Perrin
11	FW	FRA	Nicolas Mercier
12	MF	MLI	Birama Touré
14	FW	TUN	Mohamed Ben Fredj
15	DF	FRA	Alec Georgen
16	GK	FRA	Donovan Léon
17	DF	FRA	Gautier Lloris
19	FW	FRA	Gaëtan Charbonnier

No.	Pos.	Nation	Player
20	DF	FRA	Alexandre Coeff
21	FW	FRA	Rémy Dugimont
22	MF	MAR	Hamza Sakhi
23	MF	FRA	Kylian Silvestre
24	FW	FRA	Kryss Chapelle
25	FW	MLI	Lassine Sinayoko
26	DF	FRA	Paul Joly
27	MF	FRA	Alexis Trouillet (on loan from Nice)
28	MF	FRA	Ryan Ponti
29	MF	FRA	Mathias Autret
30	GK	FRA	Sonny Laiton
34	MF	COM	Iyad Mohamed
35	MF	FRA	Kévin Danois
40	GK	FRA	Théo De Percin
—	FW	CHN	Ji Xiaoxuan

=== Out on loan ===
Note: Flags indicate national team as defined under FIFA eligibility rules; some limited exceptions apply. Players may hold more than one non-FIFA nationality.

No.	Pos.	Nation	Player
—	MF	FRA	Kenji-Van Boto (on loan to Pau)

== Pre-season and friendlies ==
Win Draw Loss Fixtures

7 July 2021 Friendly	Auxerre (France)	3–1	(France) Créteil	Migennes, France
18:00 CEST (UTC+2)				Stadium: Stade Lucien Masson

10 July 2021 Friendly	Reims (France)	4–1	(France) Auxerre	Reims, France
17:00 CEST (UTC+2)	Ekitike 13', 18'; Zeneli 28'; Kebbal 52'	Report	Hein 45'	Stadium: Stade Auguste-Delaune

17 July 2021 Friendly	Auxerre (France)	1–3	(France) Orléans	Auxerre, France
17:00 CEST (UTC+2)				Stadium: Stade de l'Abbé Deschamps

3 September 2021 Friendly	Metz (France)	0–3	(France) Auxerre	Saint-Dizier, France
16:00 CEST (UTC+2)			Hein 7', 65'; Ben Fredj 52'	Stadium: Stade Marcel Jacquin

== Competitions ==
=== Overall record ===
Competition	First match	Last match	Starting round	Final position	Record							
Competition	First match	Last match	Starting round	Final position	Pld	W	D	L	GF	GA	GD	Win %
Ligue 2	24 July 2021	14 May 2022	Matchday 1	3rd	38	21	11	6	61	39	+22	55.26
Ligue 1 promotion play-offs	20 May 2022	29 May 2022	Round 2	Winners	3	0	3	0	2	2	+0	0.00
Coupe de France	13 November 2021	18 December 2021	Seventh round	Round of 64	3	2	0	1	11	9	+2	66.67
Total					44	23	14	7	74	50	+24	52.27

Source: Soccerway

=== Ligue 2 ===
==== League table ====
Pos	Team	Pld	W	D	L	GF	GA	GD	Pts	Promotion or Relegation
1	Toulouse (C, P)	38	23	10	5	82	33	+49	79	Promotion to Ligue 1
2	Ajaccio (P)	38	22	9	7	39	19	+20	75	Promotion to Ligue 1
3	Auxerre (O, P)	38	21	11	6	61	39	+22	74	Qualification to promotion play-offs
4	Paris FC	38	20	10	8	54	35	+19	70	Qualification to promotion play-offs
5	Sochaux	38	19	11	8	47	34	+13	68	Qualification to promotion play-offs

Source: Ligue 2
Rules for classification: 1) Points; 2) Goal difference; 3) Number of goals scored; 4) Head-to-head goal difference; 5) Fair play points
(C) Champions; (O) Play-off winners; (P) Promoted

==== Results summary ====
Overall								Home						Away					
Pld	W	D	L	GF	GA	GD	Pts	W	D	L	GF	GA	GD	W	D	L	GF	GA	GD
38	21	11	6	61	39	+22	74	11	4	4	33	19	+14	10	7	2	28	20	+8

Source: Ligue 2

==== Results by round ====
Round	1	2	3	4	5	6	7	8	9	10	11	12	13	14	15	16	17	18	19	20	21	22	23	24	25	26	27	28	29	30	31	32	33	34	35	36	37	38
Ground	A	H	H	A	H	A	H	A	H	A	H	A	H	A	H	A	H	A	H	A	A	H	A	H	A	H	A	H	A	H	A	H	A	H	A	H	A	H
Result	W	W	D	D	L	W	W	D	W	D	D	L	W	W	W	L	D	W	L	W	D	L	D	D	W	W	W	W	W	L	D	W	W	W	D	W	W	W
Position	4	3	4	5	7	6	3	4	4	3	3	5	5	3	2	3	4	3	4	4	5	5	5	5	5	4	4	3	3	4	4	3	3	3	3	3	3	3

Source: Ligue 2
A = Away; H = Home; W = Win; D = Draw; L = Loss

==== Matches ====
The league fixtures were announced on 25 June 2021.

24 July 2021 1	Amiens	1–2	Auxerre	Amiens
19:00 CEST (UTC+2)	Alphonse 39', (yellow card) 87'; Lomotey (yellow card) 76'	Report	Perrin (yellow card) 45+2'; Georgen (yellow card) 48'; Sakhi 63'; Hein 71'; Sinayoko (yellow card) 82'	Stadium: Stade de la Licorne; Referee: Mathieu Vernice

2 August 2021 2	Auxerre	3–0	Grenoble	Auxerre
20:45 CEST (UTC+2)	Autret 3' (pen.); Hein 14'; Sakhi 85'	Report	Bunjaku (yellow card) 42'	Stadium: Stade de l'Abbé-Deschamps; Referee: Romain Lissorgue

7 August 2021 3	Auxerre	0–0	Ajaccio	Auxerre
19:00 CEST (UTC+2)	Touré (yellow card) 60'; Sinayoko (yellow card) 68'; Hein (yellow card) 90+7'	Report	Youssouf (yellow card) 40'; Botué (yellow card) 78'; Gonzalez (yellow card) 83'; Courtet (yellow card) 90'	Stadium: Stade de l'Abbé-Deschamps; Referee: Olivier Thual

16 August 2021 4	Paris FC	1–1	Auxerre	Paris
20:45 CEST (UTC+2)	Name (yellow card) 15'; Laura 73'; Guilavogui (yellow card) 79'	Report	Léon (yellow card) 53'; Sinayoko (yellow card) 68'; Autret 80' (pen.)	Stadium: Stade Sébastien Charléty; Referee: Nicolas Rainville

23 August 2021 5	Auxerre	1–2	Guingamp	Auxerre
20:45 CEST (UTC+2)	Sinayoko (yellow card) 40'; Perrin 64'; Autret (yellow card) 89'	Report	M'Changama (yellow card) 45'; Phaëton (yellow card) 49'; Diarra 72'	Stadium: Stade de l'Abbé-Deschamps; Referee: Aurelien Petit

28 August 2021 6	Nancy	1–4	Auxerre	Tomblaine
19:00 CEST (UTC+2)	Bondo 83' (pen.); Basila (yellow card) 88'	Report	Jubal Jr. 6'; Arcus (yellow card) 17'; Ndom 30'; Bernard (yellow card) 61'; Charbonnier 63', 77'	Stadium: Stade Marcel Picot; Referee: Gael Angoula

11 September 2021 7	Auxerre	4–0	Niort	Auxerre
19:00 CEST (UTC+2)	Charbonnier 16', 70', 87'; Conté 90+1' (o.g.)	Report		Stadium: Stade de l'Abbé-Deschamps; Referee: Abdelatif Kherradji

18 September 2021 8	Quevilly-Rouen	0–0	Auxerre	Rouen
19:00 CEST (UTC+2)	Dekoke (yellow card) 62'; Sidibé (yellow card) 90+4'	Report	Hein (yellow card) 57'; Touré (red card) 57'	Stadium: Stade Robert Diochon; Referee: Olivier Thual

21 September 2021 9	Auxerre	1–0	Rodez	Auxerre
20:00 CEST (UTC+2)	Charbonnier 8'	Report		Stadium: Stade de l'Abbé-Deschamps; Referee: Bartolomeu Varela

24 September 2021 10	Sochaux	0–0	Auxerre	Montbéliard
21:00 CEST (UTC+2)		Report	Pellenard (yellow card) 65'; Ndom (yellow card) 77'	Stadium: Stade Auguste Bonal; Referee: Remi Landry

2 October 2021 11	Auxerre	2–2	Nîmes	Auxerre
15:00 CEST (UTC+2)	Touré (yellow card) 18'; Charbonnier (yellow card) 23', (goal) 48'; Autret 40'	Report	Cubas (yellow card) 37'; Koné 75', 90', (yellow card) 90+1'; Sainte-Luce (yellow card) 79'	Stadium: Stade de l'Abbé-Deschamps; Referee: Romain Lissorgue

16 October 2021 12	Toulouse	6–0	Auxerre	Toulouse
15:00 CEST (UTC+2)	Evitt-Healey 4', 72'; Ratão 7', 46', (yellow card) 47'; Mvoué 24'; Genreau (yellow card) 44'; Nicolaisen 83'	Report	Dugimont (red card) 49'	Stadium: Stadium de Toulouse; Referee: Frank Schneider

25 October 2021 13	Auxerre	1–0	Bastia	Auxerre
20:45 CEST (UTC+2)	Touré 34'; Charbonnier (yellow card) 37'; Coeff (yellow card) 66'	Report	Ducrocq (yellow card) 59'	Stadium: Stade de l'Abbé-Deschamps; Referee: Pierre Legat

1 November 2021 14	Valenciennes	1–2	Auxerre	Valenciennes
20:45 CET (UTC+1)	Hamache 48'	Report	Sinayoko 50'; Perrin 63'	Stadium: Stade du Hainaut; Referee: Aurelien Petit

6 November 2021 15	Auxerre	4–1	Pau	Auxerre
15:00 CET (UTC+1)	Perrin 8'; Hein (yellow card) 34'; Autret 73' (pen.); Bernard (yellow card) 74'; Mohamed 89'; Charbonnier 90+2'	Report	Kouassi (yellow card) 39'; Batisse (red card) 59'; Armand 67'	Stadium: Stade de l'Abbé-Deschamps; Referee: Guillaume Paradis

22 November 2021 16	Dijon	3–1	Auxerre	Dijon
20:45 CET (UTC+1)	Jacob 16'; Scheidler 38'; Benzia 79'; Coulibaly (yellow card) 87'	Report	Jubal Jr. (yellow card) 41'; Touré (yellow card) 60'; Charbonnier 61'; Pellenard (yellow card) 87'	Stadium: Stade Gaston Gérard; Referee: Nicolas Rainville

4 December 2021 17	Auxerre	2–2	Caen	Auxerre
15:00 CET (UTC+1)	Riou 45+1' (o.g.); Pellenard (red card) 53'; Jubal 81'	Report	Mendy 13'; Vandermersch 76', (yellow card) 90+1'	Stadium: Stade de l'Abbé-Deschamps; Attendance: 6,366; Referee: Jérôme Miguelgorry

11 December 2021 18	Dunkerque	0–2	Auxerre	Dunkirk
19:00 CET (UTC+1)	Dudouit (yellow card) 42'	Report	Autret 54'; Sakhi 84'	Stadium: Stade Marcel-Tribut; Referee: Guillaume Paradis

21 December 2021 19	Auxerre	2–3	Le Havre	Auxerre
20:45 CET (UTC+1)	Charbonnier (yellow card) 11' (yellow-red card) 90+4', (goal) 17', 90+1'; Hein (yellow card) 35'; Autret (yellow card) 63'; Bernard (yellow card) 90+7'	Report	Boura 3', (yellow card) 42' (yellow-red card) 68'; Alioui 41'; Boutaïb 61'; Fofana (yellow card) 79'; Bonnet (yellow card) 90+6'	Stadium: Stade de l'Abbé-Deschamps; Referee: Pierre Legat

8 January 2022 20	Grenoble	0–1	Auxerre	Grenoble
19:00 CET (UTC+1)	Gaspar (yellow card) 84'	Report	Georgen (yellow card) 25'; Charbonnier 31'; Joly (yellow card) 55'; Touré (yellow card) 90+3'	Stadium: Stade des Alpes; Referee: Benjamin Lepaysant

28 January 2022 21	Ajaccio	0–0	Auxerre	Ajaccio
19:00 CET (UTC+1)	Vidal (yellow card) 48'; Marchetti (yellow card) 60' (yellow-red card) 70'	Report	Joly (yellow card) 30'; Léon (yellow card) 35'; Jubal (yellow card) 72'	Stadium: Stade François Coty; Referee: Mathieu Vernice

1 February 2022 22	Auxerre	1–2	Paris FC	Auxerre
19:00 CET (UTC+1)	Charbonnier 13'; Léon (yellow card) 34'	Report	Guilavogui 35' (pen.), 70'; Hadjam (yellow card) 53'; Iglesias (yellow card) 56'	Stadium: Stade de l'Abbé-Deschamps; Referee: Gaël Angoula

5 February 2022 23	Guingamp	1–1	Auxerre	Guingamp
19:00 CET (UTC+1)	Sampaio (yellow card) 71'; Muyumba 77'	Report	Sinayoko 64'; Arcus (yellow card) 80'	Stadium: Stade de Roudourou; Referee: Abdelatif Kherradji

12 February 2022 24	Auxerre	1–1	Nancy	Auxerre
19:00 CET (UTC+1)	Charbonnier (yellow card) 33'; Pellenard (yellow card) 38'; Autret (yellow card) 41'; Hein 45+4'	Report	Thiam 4'; El Aynaoui (yellow card) 45'	Stadium: Stade de l'Abbé-Deschamps; Referee: Marc Bollengier

19 February 2022 25	Niort	0–1	Auxerre	Niort
19:00 CET (UTC+1)	Merdji (yellow card) 61'	Report	Hein 33'; Bernard (yellow card) 53'; Charbonnier (yellow card) 84'	Stadium: Stade René Gaillard; Referee: Frank Schneider

26 February 2022 26	Auxerre	1–0	Quevilly-Rouen	Auxerre
19:00 CET (UTC+1)	Dugimont 13', (yellow card) 66'	Report	Bahassa (yellow card) 88'	Stadium: Stade de l'Abbé-Deschamps; Referee: Remi Landry

5 March 2022 27	Rodez	1–3	Auxerre	Rodez
19:00 CET (UTC+1)	Boissier 75', (yellow card) 88'; Corredor (yellow card) 90'	Report	Hein 6', (yellow card) 37', (goal) 52'; Arcus 56'	Stadium: Stade Paul-Lignon; Referee: Jérôme Miguelgorry

12 March 2022 28	Auxerre	3–2	Sochaux	Auxerre
15:00 CET (UTC+1)	Sakhi 5'; Autret 18'; Hein (yellow card) 35'; Charbonnier 56'	Report	Kitala 36'; Aaneba (yellow card) 55'; Mauricio 76'; Kalulu (yellow card) 86'	Stadium: Stade de l'Abbé-Deschamps; Referee: Benjamin Lepaysant

15 March 2022 29	Nîmes	1–2	Auxerre	Nîmes
15:00 CET (UTC+1)	Benrahou 20'	Report	Hein 9'; Perrin 25'; Sinayoko (yellow card) 42'; Arcus (yellow card) 44'; Sakhi (red card) 90+4'	Stadium: Stade des Costières; Referee: Pierre Gaillouste

19 March 2022 30	Auxerre	1–2	Toulouse	Auxerre
15:00 CET (UTC+1)	Charbonnier (red card) 38'; Pellenard (yellow card) 42'; Dugimont 71'	Report	Spierings (yellow card) 9'; Van den Boomen 33' (pen.), 41'	Stadium: Stade de l'Abbé-Deschamps; Referee: Stéphanie Frappart

2 April 2022 31	Bastia	1–1	Auxerre	Furiani
20:00 CET (UTC+1)	Magri 45'; Le Cardinal (yellow card) 64'	Report	Jubal (yellow card) 50'; Ben Fredj 90'	Stadium: Stade Armand Cesari; Referee: Frank Schneider

9 April 2022 32	Auxerre	1–0	Valenciennes	Auxerre
15:00 CET (UTC+1)	Pellenard 8'; Sinayoko (yellow card) 60'	Report	Debuchy (yellow card) 52'; Masson (yellow card) 52'; Lecoeuche (yellow card) 89'	Stadium: Stade de l'Abbé-Deschamps; Referee: Gaël Angoula

16 April 2022 33	Pau	1–4	Auxerre	Pau
15:00 CET (UTC+1)	Daubin (yellow card) 11'; Lobry (yellow card) 43'; Sylvestre (red card) 55'; Kouassi (red card) 55'; Boto (yellow card) 64'; Batisse (yellow card) 68'	Report	Sakhi 5'; Hein 13', (yellow card) 81'; Sinayoko 74'; Joly 87'	Stadium: Nouste Camp; Referee: Aurelian Petit

19 April 2022 34	Auxerre	2–1	Dijon	Auxerre
20:00 CET (UTC+1)	Hein 3'; Coeff 24'; Arcus (yellow card) 82'	Report	Younoussa (yellow card) 31'; Philippoteaux (yellow card) 59'; Scheidler 69'	Stadium: Stade de l'Abbé-Deschamps; Referee: Marc Bollengier

23 April 2022 35	Caen	1–1	Auxerre	Caen
15:00 CEST (UTC+2)	Cissé (yellow card) 41'; Abdi (yellow card) 83'; Deminguet 89' da Costa (yellow card) 90'	Report	Charbonnier 40'; Autret (red card) 48'; Arcus (yellow card) 55'; Ndom (yellow card) 78'	Stadium: Stade Michel d'Ornano; Referee: Pierre Legat

30 April 2022 36	Auxerre	1–0	Dunkerque	Auxerre
15:00 CET (UTC+1)	Pellenard (yellow card) 68'; Perrin (yellow card) 75', (goal) 88'	Report	Pierre (yellow card) 34'; Trichard (yellow card) 41'	Stadium: Stade de l'Abbé-Deschamps; Referee: Benjamin Lepaysant

7 May 2022 37	Le Havre	1–2	Auxerre	Le Havre
21:00 CET (UTC+1)	P. Bâ 15', (yellow card) 41'; Bonnet (yellow card) 30'	Report	Pellenard (yellow card) 36'; Jubal (yellow card) 41' (yellow-red card) 61'; Hein 54'; Charbonnier 66'	Stadium: Stade Océane; Referee: Nicolas Rainville

14 May 2022 38	Auxerre	2–1	Amiens	Auxerre
19:00 CET (UTC+1)	Hein 33'; Charbonnier 62'	Report	Fofana (Fr.) (yellow card) 74'; Sangaré 82'	Stadium: Stade de l'Abbé-Deschamps; Referee: Aurelian Petit

==== Promotion play-offs ====
20 May 2022 Round 2	Auxerre	0–0 (a.e.t.) (5–4 p)	Sochaux	Auxerre
20:30 CEST (UTC+2)	Charbonnier (yellow card) 66'; Bernard (yellow card) 92'	Report	Henry (yellow card) 60'; Kitala (yellow card) 108'; Prévot (yellow card) 116'	Stadium: Stade de l'Abbé-Deschamps; Attendance: 17,324; Referee: Jérôme Brisard
	Penalties
	Dugimont (penalty scored); Jubal (penalty scored); Perrin (penalty scored); Charbonnier (penalty scored); Touré (penalty scored)		(penalty scored) Pogba; (penalty scored) Henry; (penalty missed) Kitala; (penalty scored) Virginius; (penalty scored) Ambri

26 May 2022 Play-off Final; First leg	Auxerre	1–1	Saint-Étienne	Auxerre
19:00 CEST (UTC+2)	Bernard (yellow card) 50'; Perrin 87'	Report	Youssouf 15'; Bouanga (yellow card) 59'	Stadium: Stade de l'Abbé-Deschamps; Attendance: 17,479; Referee: Benoît Millot

29 May 2022 Play-off Final; Second leg	Saint-Étienne	1–1 (a.e.t.) (2–2 agg.) (4–5 p)	Auxerre	Saint-Étienne
19:00 CEST (UTC+2)	Camara 76'	Report	Sakhi 51'; Touré (yellow card) 89'	Stadium: Stade Geoffroy-Guichard; Attendance: 24,489; Referee: Antony Gautier
	Penalties
	Boudebouz (penalty missed); Nordin (penalty scored); Trauco (penalty scored); Dioussé (penalty scored); Bouanga (penalty scored)		(penalty scored) Dugimont; (penalty scored) Jubal; (penalty scored) Perrin; (penalty scored) Charbonnier; (penalty scored) Touré

=== Coupe de France ===
13 November 2021 Seventh round	FC Limonest Saint-Didier	2–4	Auxerre	Limonest
18:00 CET (UTC+1)	Feneuil 1'; Benedick 43'	Report	Ben Fredj 24', 52', 83'; Joly 40'	Stadium: Parc des Sports Courtois-Fillot; Referee: Arnaud Baert

27 November 2021 Eighth round	Chambéry SF	4–6	Auxerre	Chambéry
15:00 CET (UTC+1)	Fortier 15', 61'; Bennour 55'; Scarantino 88'	Report	Ben Fredj 9', 31'; Dugimont 34'; Trouillet 40'; Sinayoko 49'; Hein 81'	Stadium: Plaine De Jeux Mager; Referee: Mathieu Vernice

18 December 2021 Round of 64	Lille	3–1	Auxerre	Villeneuve-d'Ascq
18:30 CET (UTC+1)	Gomes 23'; David 33'; Çelik 39'	Report	Dugimont 48'	Stadium: Stade Pierre-Mauroy; Referee: Eric Wattellier
