= Gauthier Hein =

French footballer (born 1996)

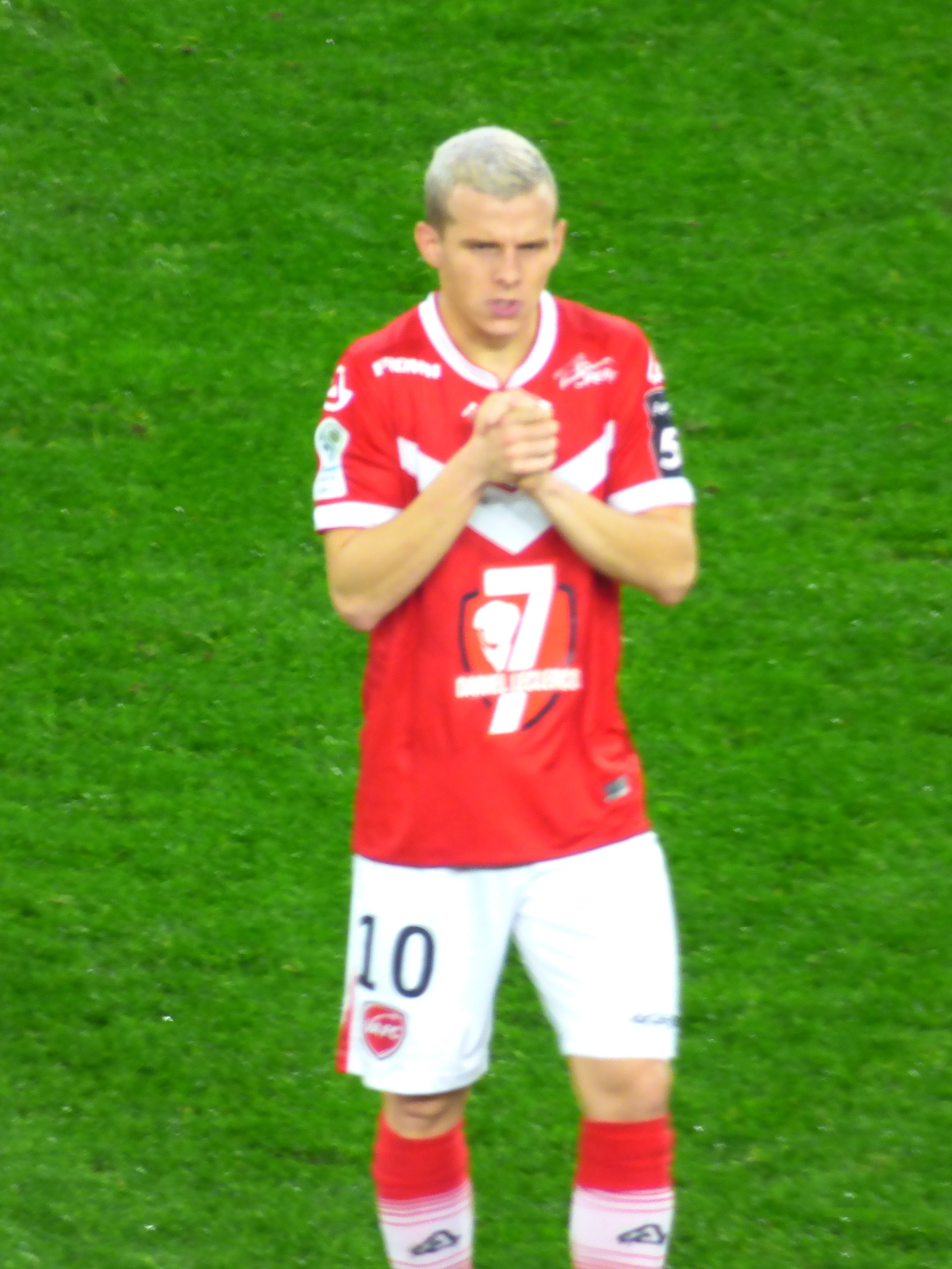
- Hein playing for Valenciennes in 2019

Personal information
- Date of birth: 7 August 1996 (age 30)
- Place of birth: Thionville, France
- Height: 1.70 m (5 ft 7 in)
- Position: Right winger

Team information
- Current team: Nice
- Number: 7

Youth career
- 2000–2008: Thionville
- 2008–2014: Metz

Senior career*
Years	Team	Apps	(Gls)
2014–2020	Metz B	42	(10)
2016–2020	Metz	19	(1)
2017–2018	→ Tours (loan)	20	(4)
2019–2020	→ Valenciennes (loan)	26	(1)
2020–2024	Auxerre	140	(28)
2024–2026	Metz	62	(20)
2026–	Nice	7	(0)
- * Club domestic league appearances and goals as of 18 October 2026

Gauthier Hein (born 7 August 1996) is a French professional footballer who plays as a right winger for Ligue 1 club Nice.

== Career ==
Hein began playing football with the youth academy of Thionville at the age of 4. He joined the youth academy of Metz at the age of 12, and worked his way up their youth teams and reserves.

On 23 May 2019, he signed his first professional contract with Metz, keeping him at the club until 2019. He signed on loan with Tours for the 2017–18 season. He then returned to Metz for the 2018–19 season, extending his contract by one more season until 2020. For the 2019–20 season, he joined Valenciennes on loan.

On 26 June 2020, Hein transferred to Auxerre, signing a three-year contract. He was one of the nominees for the 2021 FIFA Puskás Award, for a goal he scored against Niort.

== Personal life ==
Hein was a national champion in table tennis in his age group at the age of 12, and at 13 had to decide between pursuing football or tennis professionally.

== Career statistics ==
As of match played 18 October 2026

Appearances and goals by club, season and competition
Club	Season	League			Cup		League Cup		Other		Total	
Club	Season	Division	Apps	Goals	Apps	Goals	Apps	Goals	Apps	Goals	Apps	Goals
Metz B	2014–15	CFA	8	1	—		—		—		8	1
Metz B	2015–16	CFA 2	24	7	—		—		—		24	7
Metz B	2016–17	CFA 2	7	1	—		—		—		7	1
Metz B	2017–18	CFA 2	1	0	—		—		—		1	0
Metz B	2018–19	Régional 1	1	1	—		—		—		1	1
Metz B	2019–20	CFA 2	1	0	—		—		—		1	0
Metz B	Total		42	10	—		—		—		42	10
Metz	2016–17	Ligue 1	13	1	1	0	2	0	—		16	1
Metz	2017–18	Ligue 1	3	0	0	0	0	0	—		3	0
Metz	2018–19	Ligue 2	3	0	4	1	1	0	—		8	1
Metz	Total		19	1	5	1	3	0	—		27	2
Tours (loan)	2017–18	Ligue 2	20	4	2	0	1	0	—		23	4
Valenciennes (loan)	2019–20	Ligue 2	26	1	2	0	1	0	—		29	1
Auxerre	2020–21	Ligue 2	33	4	2	0	—		—		35	4
Auxerre	2021–22	Ligue 2	35	11	2	1	—		3 (Note: Appearances in Ligue 1 relegation/promotion play-offs)	0	40	12
Auxerre	2022–23	Ligue 1	35	2	3	0	—		—		38	2
Auxerre	2023–24	Ligue 1	37	11	2	0	—		—		39	11
Auxerre	Total		140	28	9	1	—		3	0	152	29
Metz	2024–25	Ligue 2	33	12	3	0	—		3	1	39	13
Metz	2025–26	Ligue 1	29	8	2	0	—		0	0	31	8
Metz	Total		62	20	5	0	—		3	1	70	21
Nice	2026–27	Ligue 1	7	0	0	0	—		—		7	0
Career total			318	64	22	2	5	0	6	1	352	67

== Honours ==
Auxerre

- Ligue 2: 2023–24

Individual

- UNFP Ligue 2 Player of the Year: 2023–24
- UNFP Ligue 2 Team of the Year: 2021–22, 2023–24, 2024–25
