= Kévin Danois =

French footballer (born 2004)

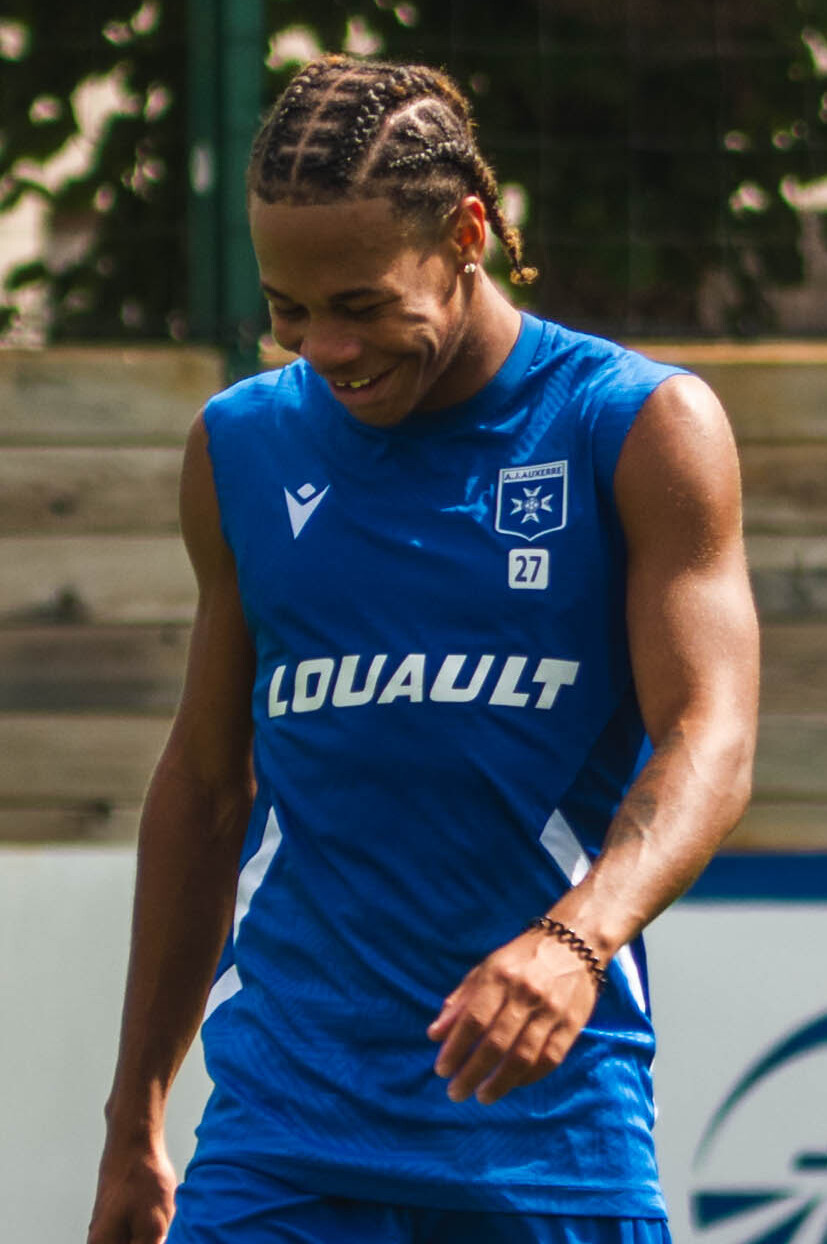
- Danois in 2024

Personal information
- Date of birth: 28 June 2004 (age 22)
- Place of birth: Basse-Terre, France
- Position: Midfielder

Team information
- Current team: Auxerre
- Number: 5

Youth career
- 2011–2019: La Gauloise
- 2019–2022: Auxerre

Senior career*
Years	Team	Apps	(Gls)
2021–2024	Auxerre B	45	(4)
2022–	Auxerre	72	(4)

International career^{‡}
2019–2020	France U16	5	(2)
2021–2022	France U18	5	(2)
2025–	France U21	6	(1)
- * Club domestic league appearances and goals as of 18 October 2026 ‡ National team caps and goals as of 6 October 2026

Kévin Danois (born 28 June 2004) is a French professional footballer who plays as a midfielder for Ligue 1 club Auxerre.

== Club career ==
Danois joined the Auxerre academy from La Gauloise in Guadeloupe on the summer 2019.

Having made his first appearance in the professional squad during the last stages of the 2020–21 season, he signed his first professional contract in July 2021.

Danois made his professional debut for Auxerre on 22 January 2023, replacing Gaëtan Perrin in a 4–0 away Coupe de France win against the Chamois Niortais.

Danois made his Ligue 1 debut on 9 April 2023, replacing the captain Birama Touré during a 3–0 away win to Ajaccio.

== International career ==
Danois is a youth international for France, first receiving a call with the under-16 in September 2019. He scored his first goal with the selection in February 2020, getting a brace during a 5–0 friendly win against Paraguay.

In August 2021 he was selected for the Tournoi de Limoges with the under-18, along the likes of Mohamed-Ali Cho, Lesley Ugochukwu and El Chadaille Bitshiabu.

He was later capped with the U18 during a serie of friendly against Algeria, scoring his first goal in that age group during the second game, a 6–0 victory, before finding the net again in the following friendly against Italy, a 3–0 win.

== Career statistics ==
As of match played 18 October 2026

Appearances and goals by club, season and competition
Club	Season	League			National cup		Europe		Other		Total	
Club	Season	Division	Apps	Goals	Apps	Goals	Apps	Goals	Apps	Goals	Apps	Goals
Auxerre B	2021–22	CFA	20	1	—		—		—		20	1
Auxerre B	2022–23	CFA	14	2	—		—		—		14	2
Auxerre B	2023–24	CFA	11	1	—		—		—		11	1
Auxerre B	Total		45	4	—		—		—		45	4
Auxerre	2021–22	Ligue 2	0	0	0	0	—		0	0	0	0
Auxerre	2022–23	Ligue 1	1	0	1	0	—		—		2	0
Auxerre	2023–24	Ligue 2	9	1	2	0	—		—		11	1
Auxerre	2024–25	Ligue 1	22	0	1	0	—		—		23	3
Auxerre	2025–26	Ligue 1	33	3	1	0	—		—		34	3
Auxerre	2026–27	Ligue 1	7	0	0	0	—		—		7	0
Auxerre	Total		72	4	4	0	—		—		76	5
Career total			116	8	5	0	0	0	0	0	121	8

== Honours ==
Auxerre

- Ligue 2: 2023–24
