= Issa Soumaré =

Senegalese footballer

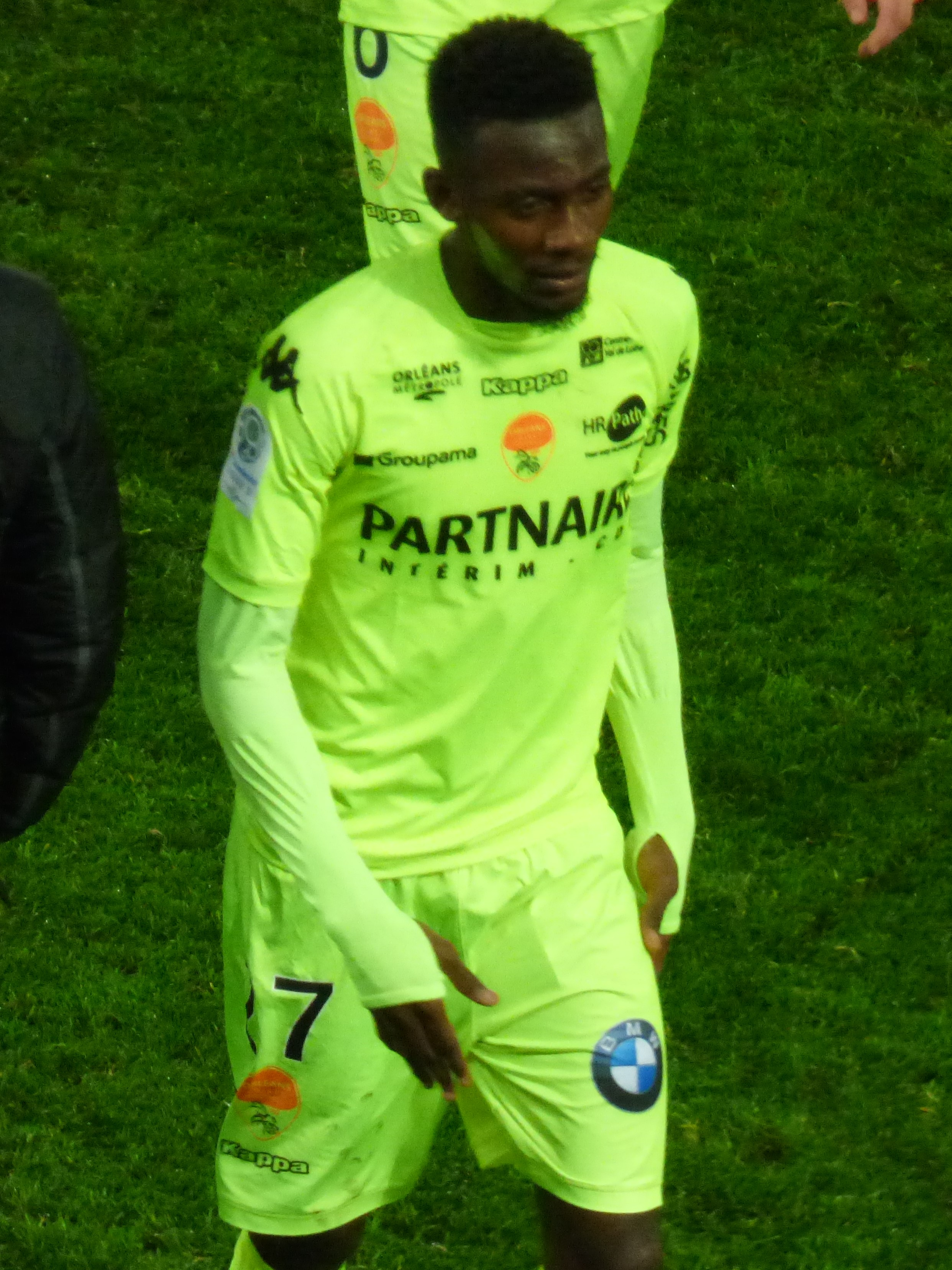
- Soumaré in 2020

Personal information
- Date of birth: 10 October 2000 (age 26)
- Place of birth: Ziguinchor, Senegal
- Height: 1.82 m (6 ft 0 in)
- Position: Forward

Team information
- Current team: Rennes
- Number: 90

Youth career
- Génération Foot

Senior career*
Years	Team	Apps	(Gls)
2019–2021	Orléans	45	(8)
2021–2023	Beerschot	11	(1)
2022–2023	→ Quevilly-Rouen (loan)	53	(7)
2023–2026	Le Havre	69	(13)
2024	→ Auxerre (loan)	17	(0)
2026–	Rennes	0	(0)

International career^{‡}
2016	Senegal U17	1	(1)
2026–	Senegal	2	(0)
- * Club domestic league appearances and goals as of 17 May 2026 ‡ National team caps and goals as of 4 October 2026

Issa Soumaré (born 10 October 2000) is a Senegalese professional footballer who plays as a forward for French Ligue 1 club Rennes and the Senegal national team.

== Club career ==
On 22 October 2019, Soumaré signed a professional contract with Orléans for four years. He debuted for Orléans in a 2–1 Ligue 2 loss to Stade Malherbe Caen on 1 November 2019.

On 6 August 2021, he signed a four-year contract with Beerschot in the Belgian top division. On 31 January 2022, Soumaré was loaned to Ligue 2 club Quevilly-Rouen until the end of the 2021–22 season. On 12 July 2022, the loan to Queville-Rouen was renewed for the 2022–23 season, with an option to buy.

On 3 July 2023, Soumaré signed for Ligue 1 club Le Havre following their promotion the previous season as champions, signing a three-year deal with the club.

In January 2024, Soumaré joined Ligue 2 club Auxerre on loan until the end of the season.

On 16 June 2026, Soumaré moved to Rennes on a four-year contract.

== International career ==
Soumaré is a youth international for Senegal, having represented the U17 team.

He was one of the players who were called up with the Senegal national team by head coach Patrick Vieira for the 2027 Africa Cup of Nations qualification matches against Mozambique and Ethiopia on 25 and 29 September 2026, respectively; and the friendly match against Comoros on 4 October 2026.

== Career statistics ==
=== Club ===
As of match played 17 May 2026

Appearances and goals by club, season and competition
Club	Season	League			Cup		Other		Total	
Club	Season	Division	Apps	Goals	Apps	Goals	Apps	Goals	Apps	Goals
Orléans	2019–20	Ligue 2	14	0	2	0	—		16	0
Orléans	2020–21	Ligue 2	31	8	1	0	—		32	8
Orléans	Total		45	8	3	0	—		48	8
Beerschot	2021–22	Belgian Pro League	11	1	1	0	—		12	1
Quevilly-Rouen (loan)	2021–22	Ligue 2	15	1	0	0	2 (Note: Appearance(s) in Ligue 2 play-offs)	2	17	3
Quevilly-Rouen (loan)	2022–23	Ligue 2	38	6	1	0	—		39	6
Quevilly-Rouen (loan)	Total		53	7	1	0	2	2	56	9
Le Havre	2023–24	Ligue 1	7	0	0	0	—		7	0
Le Havre	2024–25	Ligue 1	28	5	0	0	—		28	5
Le Havre	2025–26	Ligue 1	34	8	1	0	—		35	8
Le Havre	Total		69	13	1	0	—		70	13
Auxerre (loan)	2023–24	Ligue 2	17	0	—		—		17	0
Career total			195	29	6	0	2	2	203	31

=== International ===
As of match played 4 October 2026

Appearances and goals by national team and year
National team	Year	Apps	Goals
Senegal	2026	2	0
Total		2	0

== Honours ==
Auxerre

- Ligue 2: 2023–24
