= Donovan Léon =

French Guianese footballer (born 1992)

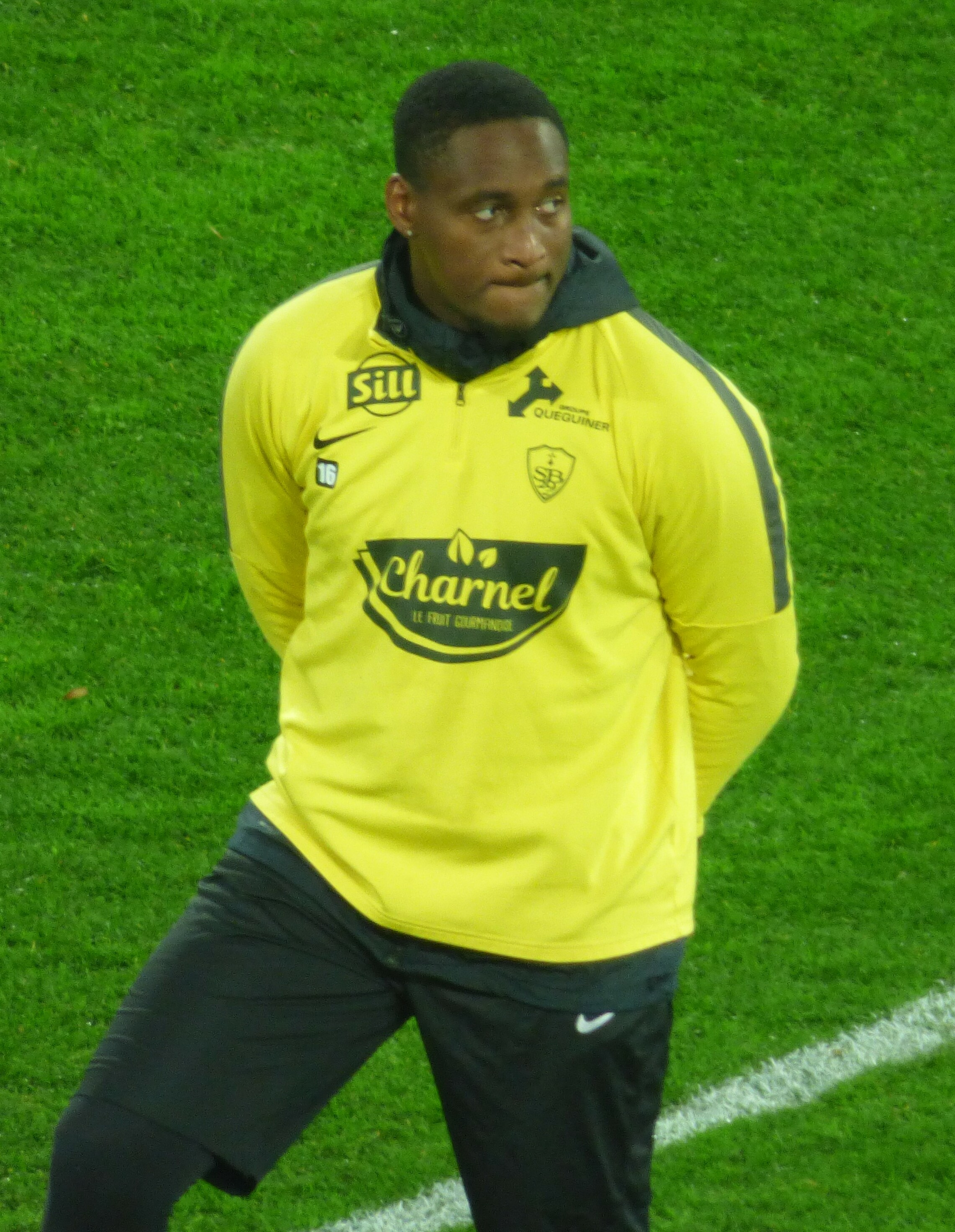
- Léon with Brest in 2018

Personal information
- Date of birth: 3 November 1992 (age 34)
- Place of birth: Cayenne, French Guiana, France
- Height: 1.86 m (6 ft 1 in)
- Position: Goalkeeper

Team information
- Current team: Abha

Youth career
- 1999–2007: Cayenne
- 2007–2009: CSF Brétigny
- 2009–2011: Auxerre

Senior career*
| Years | Team | Apps | (Gls) |
| 2010–2015 | Auxerre B | 26 | (0) |
| 2011–2015 | Auxerre | 53 | (0) |
| 2015–2019 | Brest B | 31 | (0) |
| 2015–2020 | Brest | 7 | (0) |
| 2020–2026 | Auxerre | 174 | (0) |
| 2026– | Abha | 4 | (0) |

International career^{‡}
| 2014– | French Guiana | 37 | (0) |
- * Club domestic league appearances and goals as of 2 September 2026 ‡ National team caps and goals as of 10 October 2024

Donovan Léon (born 3 November 1992) is a French Guianese professional footballer who plays as a goalkeeper for Saudi Pro League club Abha and the French Guiana national team.

== Career ==
León made his professional debut with Auxerre on 6 August 2011 in a 3–1 league defeat to Montpellier.

In June 2020, Léon returned to Auxerre after five years with Brest, signing a three-year contract. He joined on a free transfer after his contract with Brest had expired.

== Career statistics ==
=== Club ===
As of match played 1 March 2026

Appearances and goals by club, season and competition
| Club | Season | League | | | National cup | | League cup | | Other | | Total | |
| Club | Season | Division | Apps | Goals | Apps | Goals | Apps | Goals | Apps | Goals | Apps | Goals |
|---|---|---|---|---|---|---|---|---|---|---|---|---|
| Auxerre B | 2010–11 | CFA | 4 | 0 | — | | — | | — | | 4 | 0 |
| Auxerre B | 2011–12 | CFA | 5 | 0 | — | | — | | — | | 5 | 0 |
| Auxerre B | 2012–13 | CFA | 9 | 0 | — | | — | | — | | 9 | 0 |
| Auxerre B | 2013–14 | CFA 2 | 5 | 0 | — | | — | | — | | 5 | 0 |
| Auxerre B | 2014–15 | CFA 2 | 3 | 0 | — | | — | | — | | 3 | 0 |
| Auxerre B | Total | | 26 | 0 | — | | — | | — | | 26 | 0 |
| Auxerre | 2011–12 | Ligue 1 | 2 | 0 | 2 | 0 | 0 | 0 | — | | 4 | 0 |
| Auxerre | 2012–13 | Ligue 2 | 14 | 0 | 0 | 0 | 2 | 0 | — | | 16 | 0 |
| Auxerre | 2013–14 | Ligue 2 | 19 | 0 | 4 | 0 | 4 | 0 | — | | 27 | 0 |
| Auxerre | 2014–15 | Ligue 2 | 18 | 0 | 5 | 0 | 0 | 0 | — | | 23 | 0 |
| Auxerre | Total | | 53 | 0 | 11 | 0 | 6 | 0 | — | | 70 | 0 |
| Brest B | 2015–16 | CFA 2 | 16 | 0 | — | | — | | — | | 16 | 0 |
| Brest B | 2016–17 | CFA 2 | 3 | 0 | — | | — | | — | | 3 | 0 |
| Brest B | 2017–18 | National 3 | 11 | 0 | — | | — | | — | | 11 | 0 |
| Brest B | 2018–19 | National 3 | 1 | 0 | — | | — | | — | | 1 | 0 |
| Brest B | Total | | 31 | 0 | — | | — | | — | | 31 | 0 |
| Brest | 2015–16 | Ligue 2 | 2 | 0 | 1 | 0 | 0 | 0 | — | | 3 | 0 |
| Brest | 2016–17 | Ligue 2 | 2 | 0 | 2 | 0 | 2 | 0 | — | | 6 | 0 |
| Brest | 2017–18 | Ligue 2 | 0 | 0 | 1 | 0 | 0 | 0 | — | | 1 | 0 |
| Brest | 2018–19 | Ligue 2 | 1 | 0 | 3 | 0 | 2 | 0 | — | | 6 | 0 |
| Brest | 2019–20 | Ligue 1 | 2 | 0 | 0 | 0 | 3 | 0 | — | | 5 | 0 |
| Brest | Total | | 7 | 0 | 7 | 0 | 7 | 0 | — | | 21 | 0 |
| Auxerre | 2020–21 | Ligue 2 | 36 | 0 | 0 | 0 | — | | — | | 36 | 0 |
| Auxerre | 2021–22 | Ligue 2 | 38 | 0 | 0 | 0 | — | | 3 (Note: One appearance in the Ligue 2 play-offs, two appearances in the Ligue 1 relegation/promotion play-offs) | 0 | 41 | 0 |
| Auxerre | 2022–23 | Ligue 1 | 2 | 0 | 3 | 0 | — | | — | | 5 | 0 |
| Auxerre | 2023–24 | Ligue 2 | 37 | 0 | 0 | 0 | — | | — | | 37 | 0 |
| Auxerre | 2024–25 | Ligue 1 | 32 | 0 | 0 | 0 | — | | — | | 32 | 0 |
| Auxerre | 2025–26 | Ligue 1 | 22 | 0 | 0 | 0 | — | | — | | 22 | 0 |
| Auxerre | Total | | 167 | 0 | 3 | 0 | — | | 3 | 0 | 173 | 0 |
| Career total | | | 284 | 0 | 21 | 0 | 13 | 0 | 3 | 0 | 321 | 0 |

== Honours ==
Auxerre

- Ligue 2: 2023–24

French Guiana

- Caribbean Cup bronze: 2017
