= Gideon Mensah (footballer, born 1998) =

Ghanaian footballer (born 1998)

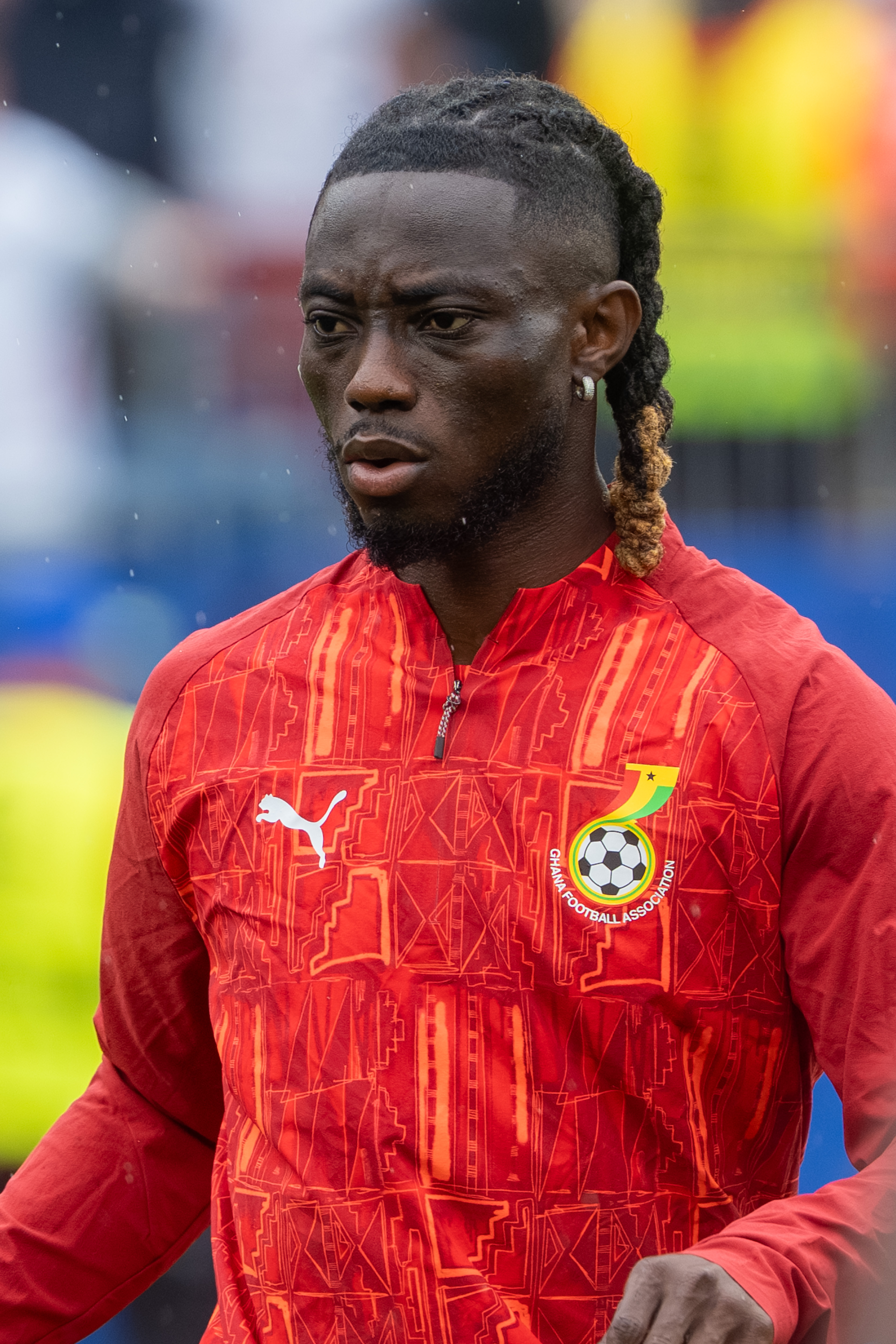
- Mensah with Ghana in 2026

Personal information
- Full name: Gideon Mensah
- Date of birth: 18 July 1998 (age 28)
- Place of birth: Accra, Ghana
- Height: 1.78 m (5 ft 10 in)
- Position: Left-back

Team information
- Current team: 1. FC Köln
- Number: 14

Senior career*
Years	Team	Apps	(Gls)
2015–2016	WAFA	8	(0)
2016–2017	FC Liefering	47	(0)
2017–2022	Red Bull Salzburg	0	(0)
2019	→ Sturm Graz (loan)	15	(0)
2019–2020	→ Zulte Waregem (loan)	19	(0)
2020–2021	→ Vitória de Guimarães (loan)	13	(0)
2021–2022	→ Bordeaux (loan)	23	(0)
2022–2026	Auxerre	111	(0)
2026–	1. FC Köln	4	(0)

International career^{‡}
2019–	Ghana	46	(0)
- * Club domestic league appearances and goals as of 19 September 2026 ‡ National team caps and goals as of 29 September 2026

Gideon Mensah (born 18 July 1998) is a Ghanaian professional footballer who plays as a left-back for German Bundesliga club 1. FC Köln and the Ghana national team.

== Club career ==
=== Red Bull Salzburg ===
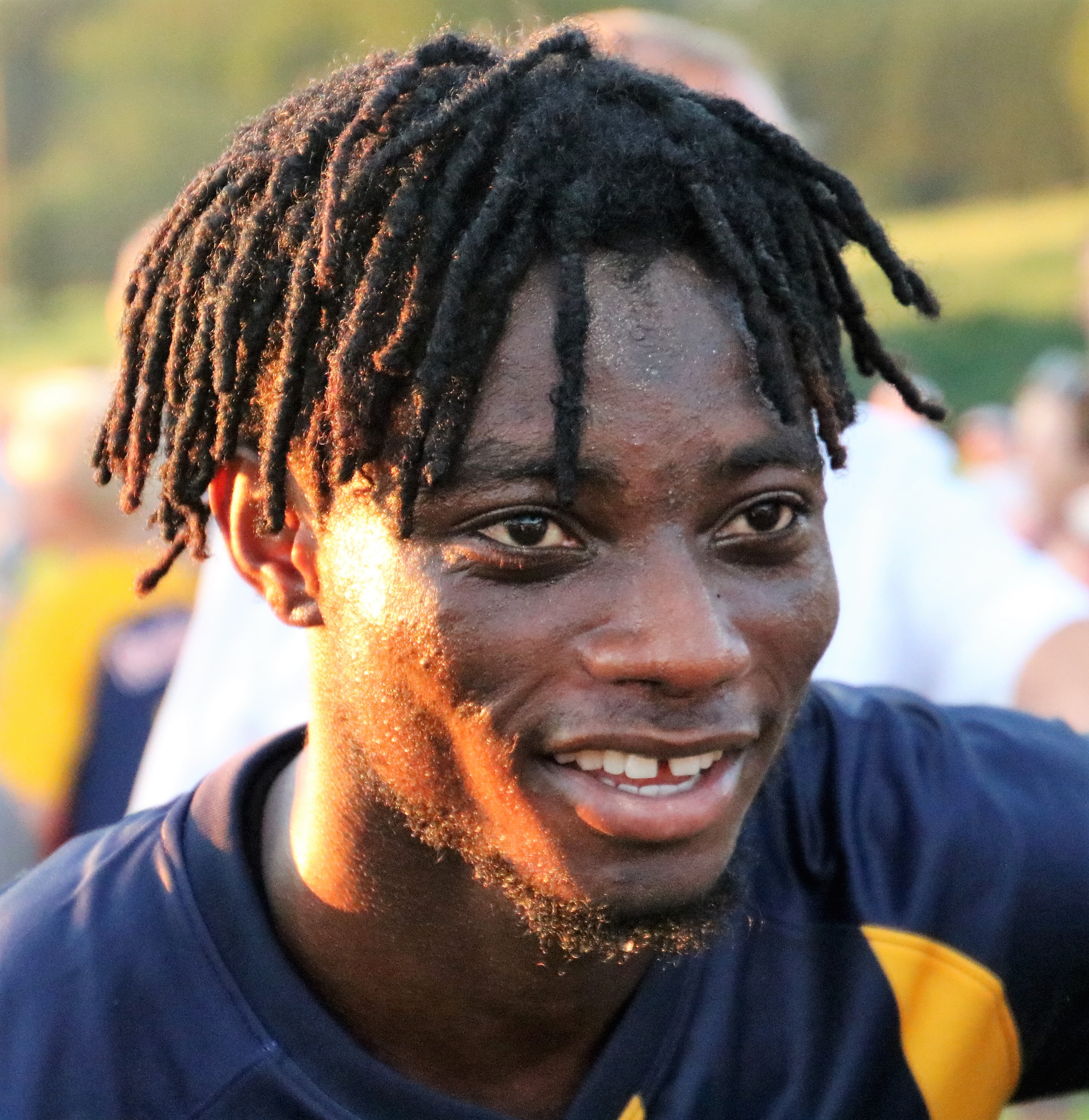
Mensah with Red Bull Salzburg in 2019

In January 2019, Mensah joined Sturm Graz on loan until the end of the season. On 29 August 2019, he was then loaned out to Belgian club Zulte Waregem for the 2019–20 season.

==== Loan to Bordeaux ====
On 3 August 2021, Mensah joined Bordeaux on a season-long loan with an option to buy until the end of the 2021–22 Ligue 1 season.

=== Auxerre ===
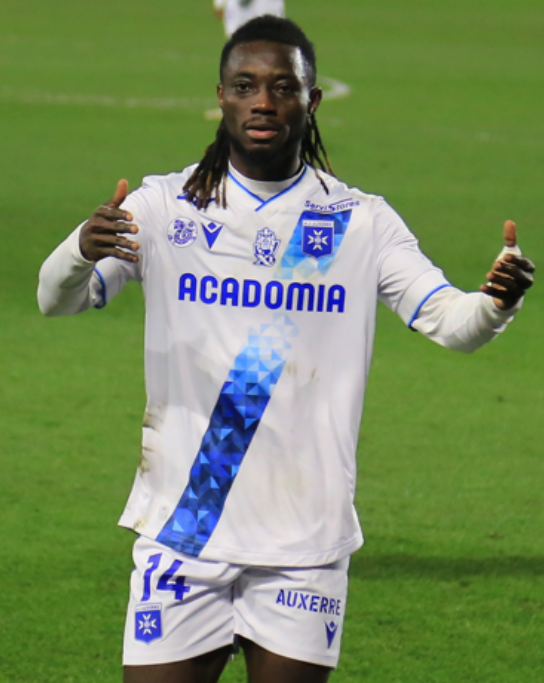
Mensah with Auxerre in 2025

On 12 August 2022, Mensah signed a three-year contract with Auxerre.

=== 1. FC Köln ===
On 11 July 2026, Mensah moved to 1. FC Köln in Germany on a two-year contract.

== International career ==
Mensah made his debut for the Ghana national team in the 2021 AFCON qualifier against South Africa in 2019.

He was part of the Ghana national team in the 2021 Africa Cup of Nations that suffered elimination at the group stage of the competition.

He was selected for the Ghanaian 2022 FIFA World Cup squad and started in the Group H match against South Korea.

On 2 June 2026, Mensah was named in head coach Carlos Queiroz's 26-man squad for the 2026 FIFA World Cup.

== Career statistics ==
=== Club ===
As of match played 19 September 2026

Appearances and goals by club, season and competition
Club	Season	League			National cup (Note: Includes Belgian Cup, Taça de Portugal, Coupe de France)		League cup		Other		Total	
Club	Season	Division	Apps	Goals	Apps	Goals	Apps	Goals	Apps	Goals	Apps	Goals
WAFA	2016	Ghanaian Premier League	8	0	0	0	—		—		15	0
FC Liefering	2016–17	2. Liga	22	0	—		—		—		22	0
FC Liefering	2017–18	2. Liga	18	0	—		—		—		18	0
FC Liefering	2018–19	2. Liga	7	0	—		—		—		7	0
FC Liefering	Total		47	0	—		—		—		47	0
Red Bull Salzburg	2017–18	Austrian Bundesliga	0	0	0	0	—		—		0	0
Red Bull Salzburg	2019–20	Austrian Bundesliga	0	0	0	0	—		—		0	0
Red Bull Salzburg	Total		0	0	0	0	—		—		0	0
Sturm Graz (loan)	2018–19	Austrian Bundesliga	15	0	—		—		—		15	0
Zulte Waregem (loan)	2019–20	Belgian First Division A	19	0	4	0	—		—		23	0
Vitória de Guimarães (loan)	2020–21	Primeira Liga	22	0	1	0	0	0	—		23	0
Bordeaux (loan)	2021–22	Ligue 1	23	0	0	0	—		—		23	0
Auxerre	2022–23	Ligue 1	26	0	1	0	—		—		27	0
Auxerre	2023–24	Ligue 2	26	0	0	0	—		—		26	0
Auxerre	2024–25	Ligue 1	29	0	0	0	—		—		29	0
Auxerre	2025–26	Ligue 1	30	0	1	0	—		—		31	0
Auxerre	Total		111	0	2	0	—		—		113	0
1. FC Köln	2026–27	Bundesliga	4	0	1	0	—		—		5	0
Career total			249	0	8	0	0	0	0	0	257	0

=== International ===
As of match played 29 September 2026

Appearances and goals by national team and year
National team	Year	Apps	Goals
Ghana	2019	2	0
Ghana	2020	2	0
Ghana	2021	2	0
Ghana	2022	7	0
Ghana	2023	7	0
Ghana	2024	9	0
Ghana	2025	9	0
Ghana	2026	8	0
Total		46	0

== Honours ==
Auxerre

- Ligue 2: 2023–24
