= Théo Pellenard =

French footballer (born 1994)

Personal information
- Date of birth: 4 March 1994 (age 32)
- Place of birth: Lille, France
- Height: 1.82 m (6 ft 0 in)
- Position: Left-back

Team information
- Current team: Meizhou Hakka

Youth career
- 2000–2006: US Pradetane
- 2006–2008: Hyères
- 2008–2009: La Valette
- 2009–2013: Bordeaux

Senior career*
Years	Team	Apps	(Gls)
2012–2017	Bordeaux B	45	(2)
2013–2019	Bordeaux	28	(0)
2015–2016	→ Paris FC (loan)	20	(1)
2015	→ Paris FC B (loan)	1	(0)
2019–2020	Angers B	7	(0)
2019–2020	Angers	14	(0)
2020–2021	Valenciennes	15	(0)
2021–2025	Auxerre	72	(1)
2025–2026	Laval	28	(0)
2026–	Meizhou Hakka	0	(0)

International career
2014	France U20	1	(0)
- * Club domestic league appearances and goals as of 2 December 2025

Théo Pellenard (born 4 March 1994) is a French professional footballer who plays as a left-back for China League One club Meizhou Hakka.

== Club career ==
Born in Lille, Pellenard made his debut for Bordeaux on 12 December 2013 in the UEFA Europa League group stage against Maccabi Tel Aviv replacing Sessi D'Almeida after 75 minutes. He made his Ligue 1 debut on 15 December 2013 in a 2–1 home win against Valenciennes playing the full game as a left-back.

In August 2015, Pellenard joined Ligue 2 newcomers Paris FC on a one season loan-deal. He scored in his first match for the club against Brest.

On 31 January 2019, the last day of the 2018–19 winter transfer window, Pellenard moved to Bordeaux's league rivals Angers on a free transfer. He signed a 1.5-year contract. Pellenard eventually left Angers after his contract with the club expired in 2020.

On 28 October 2020, Pellenard joined Ligue 2 side Valenciennes on a one-year deal.

On 16 January 2025, Pellenard moved to Laval on a two-and-a-half-year deal.

On 22 January 2026, Pellenard parted ways with Laval, joining Chinese club Meizhou Hakka.

== Career statistics ==
As of match played 29 May 2022

Appearances and goals by club, season and competition
Club	Season	League			National cup		League cup		Other		Total	
Club	Season	Division	Apps	Goals	Apps	Goals	Apps	Goals	Apps	Goals	Apps	Goals
Bordeaux B	2011–12	CFA	1	0	—		—		—		1	0
Bordeaux B	2012–13	CFA	6	0	—		—		—		6	0
Bordeaux B	2013–14	CFA	18	0	—		—		—		18	0
Bordeaux B	2014–15	CFA	9	1	—		—		—		9	1
Bordeaux B	2016–17	CFA 2	5	0	—		—		—		5	0
Bordeaux B	2017–18	National 3	2	1	—		—		—		2	1
Bordeaux B	2018–19	National 2	4	0	—		—		—		4	0
Bordeaux B	Total		45	2	—		—		—		45	2
Bordeaux	2013–14	Ligue 1	3	0	0	0	0	0	1 (Note: Appearance in the UEFA Europa League)	0	4	0
Bordeaux	2016–17	Ligue 1	6	0	2	0	1	0	—		9	0
Bordeaux	2017–18	Ligue 1	19	0	1	0	1	0	0	0	21	0
Bordeaux	Total		28	0	3	0	2	0	1	0	34	0
Paris FC (loan)	2015–16	Ligue 2	20	1	1	0	0	0	—		21	1
Paris FC B (loan)	2015–16	CFA 2	1	0	—		—		—		1	0
Angers B	2018–19	National 3	2	0	—		—		—		2	0
Angers B	2019–20	National 2	5	0	—		—		—		5	0
Angers B	Total		7	0	—		—		—		7	0
Angers	2018–19	Ligue 1	6	0	0	0	0	0	—		6	0
Angers	2019–20	Ligue 1	8	0	2	0	1	0	—		11	0
Angers	Total		14	0	2	0	1	0	—		17	0
Valenciennes	2020–21	Ligue 2	15	0	1	0	—		—		16	0
Auxerre	2021–22	Ligue 2	34	1	1	0	—		2 (Note: Appearances in the Ligue 1 relegation/promotion play-offs)	0	37	0
Auxerre	2022–23	Ligue 1	2	0	0	0	—		—		2	0
Auxerre	2023–24	Ligue 2	34	0	1	0	—		—		35	0
Auxerre	2024–25	Ligue 1	2	0	0	0	—		—		35	0
Auxerre	Total		72	1	2	0	—		2	0	76	1
Laval	2024–25	Ligue 2	15	0	0	0	—		—		15	0
Laval	2025–26	Ligue 2	13	0	3	0	—		—		16	0
Laval	Total		28	0	3	0	—		—		31	0
Meizhou Hakka	2026	China League One	0	0	0	0	—		—		15	0
Career total			230	4	12	0	3	0	3	0	248	4

== Honours ==
Auxerre

- Ligue 2: 2023–24
