= Ado Onaiwu =

Japanese footballer

Ado Onaiwu オナイウ 阿道
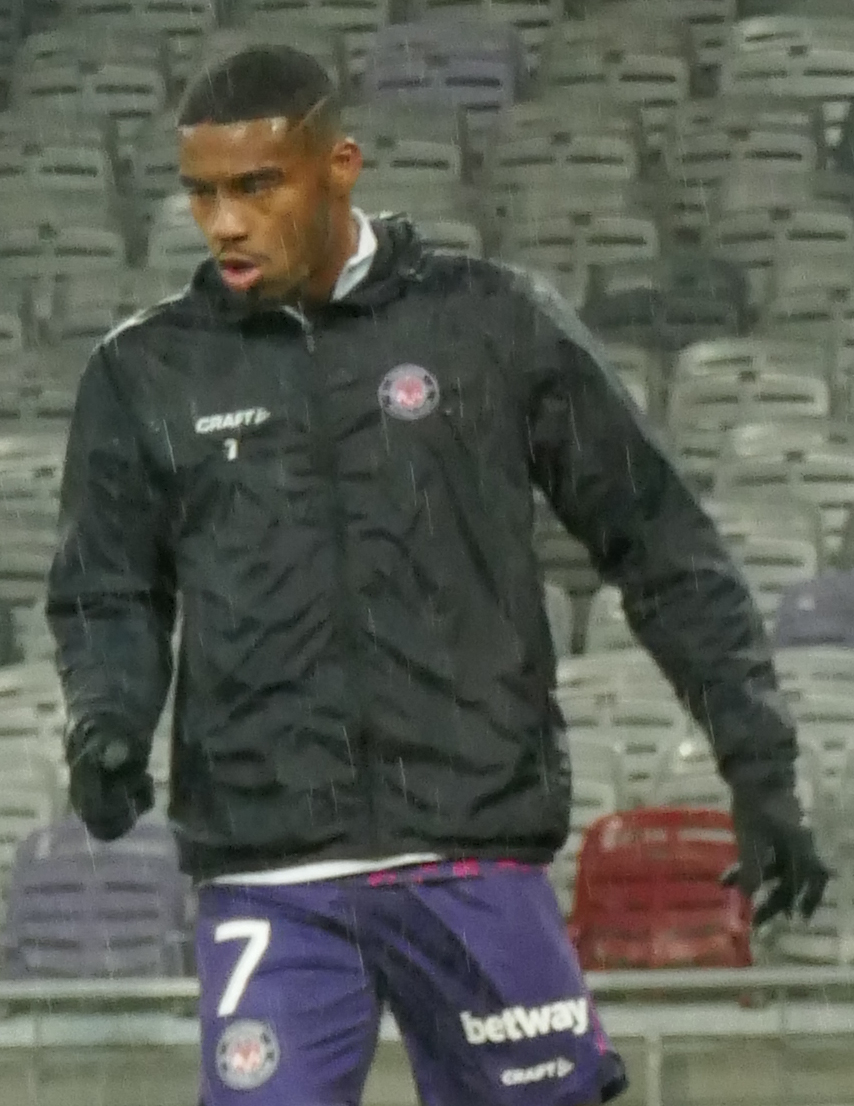
- Onaiwu warming up for Toulouse in 2022

Personal information
- Date of birth: 8 November 1995 (age 31)
- Place of birth: Kamikawa, Saitama, Japan
- Height: 1.80 m (5 ft 11 in)
- Position: Forward

Team information
- Current team: Urawa Red Diamonds
- Number: 45

Youth career
- 2002–2007: Kamikawa Parfait SSS
- 2008–2010: FC Coruja
- 2011–2013: Shochi Fukaya High School

Senior career*
Years	Team	Apps	(Gls)
2014–2016	JEF United Chiba	62	(10)
2014	→ J.League U-22 (loan)	2	(0)
2017–2020	Urawa Red Diamonds	1	(0)
2018	→ Renofa Yamaguchi (loan)	42	(22)
2019	→ Oita Trinita (loan)	31	(10)
2020–2021	Yokohama F. Marinos	44	(16)
2021–2023	Toulouse	72	(12)
2023–2025	Auxerre	65	(19)
2025–2026	1. FC Magdeburg	4	(0)
2026–	Urawa Red Diamonds	15	(0)

International career^{‡}
2014	Japan U19	3	(0)
2016	Japan U23	8	(0)
2021	Japan	3	(3)
Medal record
Urawa Reds
Winner	AFC Champions League	2017
Representing Japan
AFC U23 Championship
Gold medal – first place	2016 Qatar
- * Club domestic league appearances and goals as of 6 June 2026 ‡ National team caps and goals as of 7 October 2021

Ado Onaiwu (オナイウ 阿道, Onaiu Ado; born 8 November 1995) is a Japanese professional footballer who plays as a forward for J1 League club Urawa Red Diamonds.

== Club career ==
On 20 July 2021, Onaiwu moved abroad for the first time to join Ligue 2 side Toulouse.

On 29 April 2023, he became the first Asian and Japanese player to win the Coupe de France with Toulouse.

On 28 August 2023, he signed for Ligue 2 club Auxerre on a three-year contract.

On 1 September 2025, Onaiwu moved to 1. FC Magdeburg in German 2. Bundesliga.

== International career ==
Onaiwu made his international debut for Japan on 11 June 2021 in a friendly match with Serbia. Four days later, he scored a hat-trick against Kyrgyzstan at a FIFA World Cup qualifying match.

== Personal life ==
He is the son of a Japanese mother and a Nigerian father. His brother, George Onaiwu, is also a footballer, playing for Yokohama F. Marinos.

== Career statistics ==
=== Club ===
As of match played 28 April 2024

Appearances and goals by club, season and competition
Club	Season	League			National cup (Note: Includes Emperor's Cup and Coupe de France)		League cup (Note: Includes J.League Cup)		Continental (Note: Includes AFC Champions League)		Other (Note: Includes Japanese Super Cup, Suruga Bank Championship and FIFA Club World Cup)		Total	
Club	Season	Division	Apps	Goals	Apps	Goals	Apps	Goals	Apps	Goals	Apps	Goals	Apps	Goals
JEF United Chiba	2014	J.League Division 2	6	1	2	1	—		—		—		8	2
JEF United Chiba	2015	J2 League	33	3	2	0	—		—		—		35	3
JEF United Chiba	2016	J2 League	23	6	1	0	—		—		—		24	6
JEF United Chiba	Total		62	10	5	1	—		—		—		67	11
J. League U-22 (loan)	2014	J3 League	2	0	—		—		—		—		2	0
Urawa Red Diamonds	2017	J1 League	1	0	3	1	0	0	2	0	1	0	7	1
Renofa Yamaguchi (loan)	2018	J2 League	42	22	2	0	—		—		—		44	22
Oita Trinita (loan)	2019	J1 League	31	10	3	0	5	0	—		—		39	10
Yokohama F. Marinos	2020	J1 League	24	4	—		2	0	6	4	1	0	33	8
Yokohama F. Marinos	2021	J1 League	20	12	0	0	7	3	—		—		27	15
Yokohama F. Marinos	Total		44	16	0	0	9	3	6	4	1	0	60	23
Toulouse	2021–22	Ligue 2	38	10	5	2	—		—		—		43	12
Toulouse	2022–23	Ligue 1	22	2	1	0	—		—		—		23	2
Toulouse	Total		60	12	6	2	—		—		—		66	14
Auxerre	2023–24	Ligue 2	34	15	1	0	—		—		—		35	15
Auxerre	2024–25	Ligue 1	28	4	0	0	—		—		—		28	4
Auxerre	Total		62	19	1	0	—		—		—		63	19
Career total			304	89	20	4	14	3	8	4	2	0	348	100

=== International ===
Scores and results list Japan's goal tally first, score column indicates score after each Onaiwu goal.

List of international goals scored by Ado Onaiwu
No.	Date	Venue	Opponent	Score	Result	Competition
1	15 June 2021	Panasonic Stadium Suita, Suita, Japan	Kyrgyzstan	1–0	5–1	2022 FIFA World Cup qualification
2	15 June 2021	Panasonic Stadium Suita, Suita, Japan	Kyrgyzstan	2–0	5–1	2022 FIFA World Cup qualification
3	15 June 2021	Panasonic Stadium Suita, Suita, Japan	Kyrgyzstan	3–0	5–1	2022 FIFA World Cup qualification

== Honours ==
Urawa Red Diamonds

- AFC Champions League: 2017
- J.League Cup / Copa Sudamericana Championship: 2017

Toulouse

- Ligue 2: 2021–22
- Coupe de France: 2022–23

Auxerre

- Ligue 2: 2023–24

Japan U23

- AFC U-23 Championship: 2016
