= Raphaël Adicéam =

French footballer (born 1990)

Personal information
- Date of birth: 3 July 1990 (age 36)
- Place of birth: Argenteuil, France
- Height: 1.79 m (5 ft 10 in)
- Position: Goalkeeper

Team information
- Current team: Les Sables VF

Youth career
- Entente SSG

Senior career*
| Years | Team | Apps | (Gls) |
| 2009–2012 | Entente SSG | 62 | (0) |
| 2012–2015 | Aubervilliers | 72 | (0) |
| 2015–2018 | Amiens B | 24 | (0) |
| 2015–2018 | Amiens | 0 | (0) |
| 2018–2020 | RC France | 24 | (0) |
| 2020–2021 | Red Star | 10 | (0) |
| 2022–2023 | Beauvais | 42 | (0) |
| 2023–2025 | Auxerre | 0 | (0) |
| 2024 | Auxerre B | 1 | (0) |
| 2025– | Les Sables VF | 0 | (0) |
- * Club domestic league appearances and goals as of 17 May 2025

Raphaël Adicéam (born 3 July 1990) is a French professional footballer who plays as a goalkeeper for Championnat National 3 club Les Sables VF.

== Career ==
While playing for Amiens, Adicéam made his professional debut in a 2–1 Coupe de la Ligue loss to Clermont on 9 August 2016.

On 3 January 2022, Adicéam signed for Championnat National 2 side Beauvais.

On 21 September 2023, Adicéam joined Auxerre until the end of the season.
