= Quentin Bernard =

French footballer (born 1989)

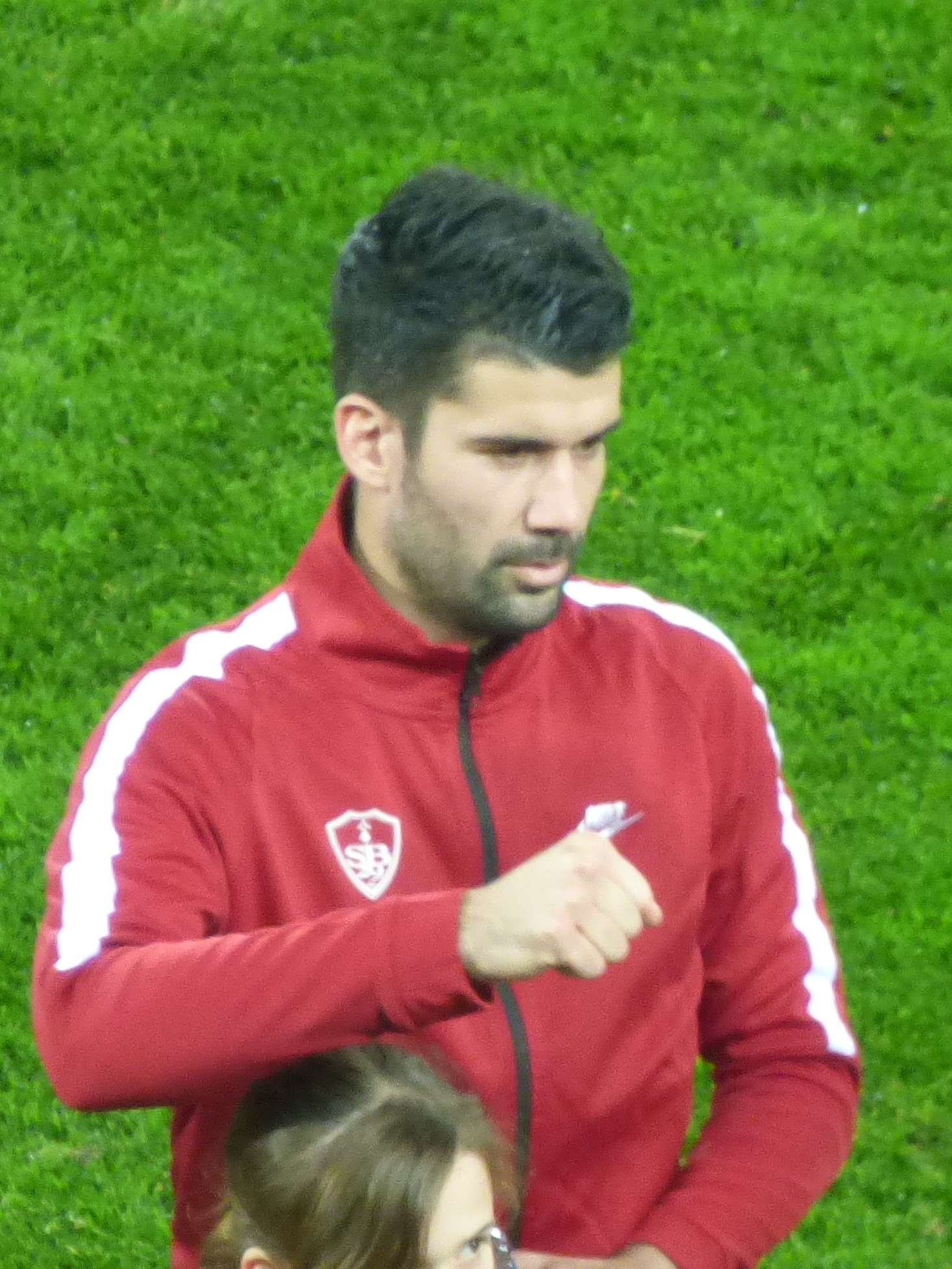
- Bernard with Brest in 2018

Personal information
- Date of birth: 7 July 1989 (age 37)
- Place of birth: Poitiers, France
- Height: 1.83 m (6 ft 0 in)
- Position: Left-back

Team information
- Current team: Dijon
- Number: 5

Youth career
- 2004–2008: Niort

Senior career*
Years	Team	Apps	(Gls)
2008–2015	Niort	200	(3)
2015–2017	Dijon	30	(0)
2015–2016	Dijon B	4	(0)
2017–2019	Brest	80	(1)
2019–2023	Auxerre	101	(2)
2023–2024	Niort	51	(1)
2024–	Dijon	54	(1)
- * Club domestic league appearances and goals as of 22 June 2026

Quentin Bernard (born 7 July 1989) is a French professional footballer who plays as a left-back for Ligue 2 club Dijon.

== Career ==
Born in Poitiers, Bernard started his career with nearby Niort. He joined the club's youth system in 2004, and went on to make more than 200 senior appearances in all competitions for the side between 2008 and 2015. On 29 May 2015, it was announced that Bernard had signed a two-year contract with Dijon, where he joined up with former Niort teammate Johan Gastien.

On 17 January 2023, Bernard returned to Niort. On 13 August 2024, he returned to Dijon.
