= Gaëtan Perrin =

French footballer (born 1996)

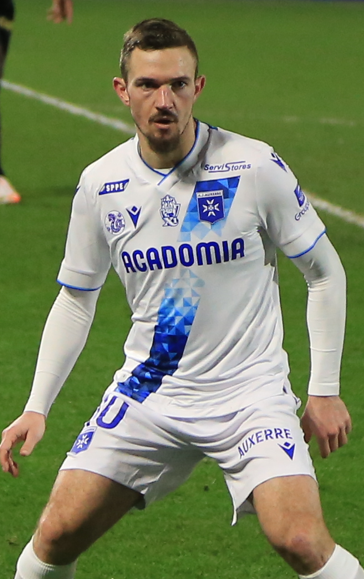
- Perrin with Auxerre in 2025

Personal information
- Date of birth: 7 June 1996 (age 30)
- Place of birth: Lyon, France
- Height: 1.69 m (5 ft 7 in)
- Position: Right midfielder

Team information
- Current team: Lille
- Number: 28

Youth career
- 2005–2015: Lyon

Senior career*
Years	Team	Apps	(Gls)
2014–2017	Lyon B	54	(4)
2016–2018	Lyon	3	(1)
2017–2018	→ Orléans (loan)	16	(1)
2018–2021	Orléans	94	(20)
2021–2025	Auxerre	145	(25)
2025–2026	Krasnodar	12	(1)
2026–	Lille	17	(1)
- * Club domestic league appearances and goals as of 30 October 2026

Gaëtan Perrin (born 7 June 1996) is a French professional footballer who plays as a right midfielder for Ligue 1 club Lille.

== Career ==
Perrin is a youth exponent from Lyon. He made his Ligue 1 debut at 14 February 2016 against Stade Malherbe Caen replacing Alexandre Lacazette after 88 minutes in a 4–1 home win. On 19 March 2016, he scored his first professional goal two minutes after having come onto the pitch, thereby helping his club to a 2–0 win against Nantes.

On 9 January 2017, it was announced that Perrin would join Ligue 2 side US Orléans on loan until the end of the season. Nine days later, however, the loan was invalidated by the National Directorate of Management Control's decision to prohibit recruitment by Orléans. The club subsequently sold Jean-Eudes Aholou and appealed the ban. Perrin eventually joined Orléans on a season-long loan on 21 June 2017. In January 2018 the loan was made permanent when Perrin signed a three-and-a-half-year contract.

On 23 July 2025, Russian Premier League club Krasnodar announced the signing of Perrin from Auxerre, to a three-year contract.

On 2 February 2026, Perrin returned to France and signed a two-and-a-half-season contract with Lille.

== Career statistics ==
As of match played 3 November 2026

Appearances and goals by club, season and competition
Club	Season	League			National cup (Note: Includes Coupe de France, Russian Cup)		League cup (Note: Includes Coupe de la Ligue)		Europe		Other		Total	
Club	Season	Division	Apps	Goals	Apps	Goals	Apps	Goals	Apps	Goals	Apps	Goals	Apps	Goals
Lyon	2015–16	Ligue 1	3	1	0	0	0	0	0	0	0	0	3	1
Lyon	2016–17	Ligue 1	0	0	0	0	0	0	0	0	0	0	0	0
Lyon	Total		3	1	0	0	0	0	0	0	0	0	3	1
Orléans (loan)	2017–18	Ligue 2	16	1	1	0	2	1	—		—		19	2
Orléans	2017–18	Ligue 2	12	2	—		—		—		—		12	2
Orléans	2018–19	Ligue 2	25	2	6	4	2	0	—		—		33	6
Orléans	2019–20	Ligue 2	25	3	2	0	2	1	—		—		29	4
Orléans	2020–21	National	32	13	1	0	—		—		—		33	13
Orléans	Total		110	21	10	4	6	2	—		—		126	27
Orléans B	2018–19	National 3	4	2	—		—		—		—		4	2
Auxerre	2021–22	Ligue 2	37	5	1	0	—		—		2 (Note: Appearances in Ligue 2 Promotion play-offs)	1	40	6
Auxerre	2022–23	Ligue 1	37	3	2	2	—		—		—		39	5
Auxerre	2023–24	Ligue 2	38	7	3	0	—		—		—		41	7
Auxerre	2024–25	Ligue 1	34	10	1	0	—		—		—		35	10
Auxerre	Total		146	25	7	2	—		—		2	1	155	28
Krasnodar	2025–26	Russian Premier League	12	1	8	1	—		—		—		20	2
Lille	2025–26	Ligue 1	12	1	0	0	—		3 (Note: Appearances in UEFA Europa League)	0	—		15	1
Lille	2026–27	Ligue 1	5	0	0	0	—		3 (Note: Appearances in UEFA Champions League)	0	—		8	0
Lille	Total		17	1	0	0	—		6	0	—		23	1
Career total			292	51	25	7	6	2	6	0	2	1	331	61

== Honours ==
Auxerre

- Ligue 2: 2023–24

Individual

- UNFP Team of the Year: 2023–24
