= Jean Louchet =

French footballer (born 1996)

Personal information
- Date of birth: 3 December 1996 (age 29)
- Place of birth: Beauvais, France
- Height: 1.92 m (6 ft 4 in)
- Position: Goalkeeper

Team information
- Current team: Valenciennes
- Number: 1

Youth career
- 2006–2011: Beauvais
- 2009–2011: Liévin
- 2011–2014: Amiens
- 2014–2015: Paris Saint-Germain

Senior career*
Years	Team	Apps	(Gls)
2015–2016	Paris Saint-Germain B	25	(0)
2016–2017	Reims B	9	(0)
2017–2021	Les Herbiers	42	(0)
2017–2018	Les Herbiers B	22	(0)
2021–2023	Niort	9	(0)
2021–2023	Niort B	16	(0)
2023–	Valenciennes	68	(0)
2023–2024	Valenciennes B	3	(0)
- * Club domestic league appearances and goals as of 23 June 2026

Jean Louchet (born 3 December 1996) is a French professional footballer who plays as a goalkeeper for Ligue 3 club Valenciennes.

== Career ==
Louchet started playing football at the age of nine, joining the youth team of his hometown club AS Beauvais. Louchet then joined the Liévin youth team and then Amiens. In 2014, he joined the Paris Saint-Germain Academy. He made his senior debut with the team's reserve side in the 2015–16 Championnat de France Amateur. After two years at Paris Saint-Germain, he moved to Reims' reserve team, where he spent one season.

In 2017, he joined Les Herbiers. In the first season at the club, he only played with the reserves, and did not appear in the club's 2018 Coupe de France finalist campaign. After the club relegated to the Championnat National 2, he became a regular starter for the club during 3 seasons. While the 2020–21 season was suspended due to COVID-19, he temporarily worked as a real estate agent.

In July 2021, Louchet joined Niort and signed his first professional contract. At the club, he made his Ligue 2 debut.

On 28 July 2023, Louchet signed for Ligue 2 fellow Valenciennes as a free agent. In his first season at the club, he played a crucial role in the team's Coupe de France semi-finals run, notably by his performance in the quarter-finals, where he stopped 2 shots in the penalty shootout against FC Rouen to qualify his team.

== Honours ==
Les Herbiers

- Coupe de France runner-up: 2017–18
