= 2021–22 Ligue 2 =

83rd season of the second-tier football league in France

Ligue 2
- Season: 2021–22
- Dates: 24 july 2021 – 14 may 2022
- Champions: Toulouse
- Promoted: Toulouse; Ajaccio; Auxerre
- Relegated: Dunkerque; Nancy
- Matches: 380
- Goals: 868 (2.28 per match)
- Top goalscorer: Rhys Healey (20 goals)
- Biggest home win: Toulouse 6–0 Auxerre (16 October 2021); Toulouse 6–0 Amiens (15 March 2022)
- Biggest away win: Grenoble 0–4 Paris FC (24 July 2021); Nancy 0–4 Toulouse (31 July 2021)
- Highest scoring: Valenciennes 6–1 Nancy (1 February 2022)
- Longest winning run: 6 matches Paris FC
- Longest unbeaten run: 16 matches Paris FC
- Longest winless run: 15 matches Rodez
- Longest losing run: 6 matches Niort

The 2021–22 Ligue 2 was the 83rd season of the Ligue 2. The season began on 24 July 2021 and concluded on 14 May 2022. The fixtures were announced on 25 June 2021.

== Teams ==
=== Team changes ===
| ▲ from Championnat National | ▲ to Ligue 1 | ▼ from Ligue 1 | ▼ to Championnat National |
|---|---|---|---|
| Bastia; Quevilly-Rouen | Troyes; Clermont | Dijon; Nîmes | Châteauroux; Chambly |

=== Stadia and locations ===
Location of teams in 2021–22 Ligue 2

| Club | Location | Venue | Capacity |
|---|---|---|---|
| Ajaccio | Ajaccio | Stade François Coty | 10,446 |
| Amiens | Amiens | Stade de la Licorne | 12,097 |
| Auxerre | Auxerre | Stade de l'Abbé-Deschamps | 21,379 |
| Bastia | Furiani | Stade Armand Cesari | 16,078 |
| Caen | Caen | Stade Michel d'Ornano | 21,215 |
| Dijon | Dijon | Stade Gaston Gérard | 15,995 |
| Dunkerque | Dunkirk | Stade Marcel-Tribut | 4,200 |
| Grenoble | Grenoble | Stade des Alpes | 20,068 |
| Guingamp | Guingamp | Stade de Roudourou | 18,378 |
| Le Havre | Le Havre | Stade Océane | 25,178 |
| Nancy | Tomblaine | Stade Marcel Picot | 20,087 |
| Nîmes | Nîmes | Stade des Costières | 18,482 |
| Niort | Niort | Stade René Gaillard | 10,886 |
| Paris FC | Paris (13th arrondissement) | Stade Charléty | 20,000 |
| Pau | Pau | Nouste Camp | 4,031 |
| Rodez | Rodez | Stade Paul-Lignon | 5,955 |
| Quevilly-Rouen | Rouen | Stade Robert Diochon | 12,018 |
| Sochaux | Montbéliard | Stade Auguste Bonal | 20,005 |
| Toulouse | Toulouse | Stadium Municipal | 33,150 |
| Valenciennes | Valenciennes | Stade du Hainaut | 25,172 |

=== Personnel and kits ===
| Team | Manager | Captain | Kit manufacturer | Main sponsor |
|---|---|---|---|---|
| Ajaccio | (France) Olivier Pantaloni | (Guadeloupe) Cédric Avinel | Adidas | Auchan Atrium |
| Amiens | (France) Philippe Hinschberger | (France) Arnaud Lusamba | Puma | Intersport |
| Auxerre | (France) Jean-Marc Furlan | (Mali) Birama Touré | Macron | Remorques LOUALT |
| Bastia | (France) Régis Brouard | (France) Christophe Vincent | Adidas | Oscaro Power |
| Caen | (France) Stéphane Moulin | (Martinique) Jonathan Rivierez | Umbro | Maisons France Confort (H), Campagne de France (A & 3) |
| Dijon | (France) Patrice Garande | (Gabon) Bruno Ecuele Manga | Lotto | Groupe Roger Martin (H) |
| Dunkerque | (France) Romain Revelli | (France) Axel Maraval | Kappa | Intersport |
| Grenoble | (France) Vincent Hognon | (France) Brice Maubleu | Nike | Carrefour, Sempa, BONTAZ |
| Guingamp | (France) Stéphane Dumont | (Comoros) Youssouf M'Changama | Umbro | Servagroupe (H), Aroma Celte (A) |
| Le Havre | (France) Paul Le Guen | (France) Alexandre Bonnet | Joma | Filiassur, SEAFRIGO Group |
| Nancy | (France) Albert Cartier | (Guinea) Ernest Seka | Puma | Lor Port |
| Nîmes | (France) Nicolas Usaï | (France) Anthony Briançon | Puma | Bastide Médical |
| Niort | (France) Sébastien Desabre | (France) Dylan Louiserre | Erima | Restaurant Le Billon (H), Cheminées Poujoulat (A) |
| Paris FC | (France) Thierry Laurey | (France) Vincent Demarconnay | Nike | Vinci |
| Pau | (France) Didier Tholot | (France) Antoine Batisse | Adidas | Iroise Bellevie |
| Quevilly-Rouen | (France) Fabien Mercadal | (France) Romain Padovani | Kappa | Matmut |
| Rodez | (France) Laurent Peyrelade | (France) Pierre Bardy | Adidas | Max Outil |
| Sochaux | (Senegal) Omar Daf | (France) Gaëtan Weissbeck | Nike | Nedey Automobiles |
| Toulouse | (France) Philippe Montanier | (Belgium) Brecht Dejaegere | Craft | LP Promotion Group |
| Valenciennes | (France) Christophe Delmotte | (France) Laurent Dos Santos | Acerbis | Mutuelle Just |

=== Managerial changes ===
| Team | Outgoing manager | Manner of departure | Date of vacancy | Position in table | Incoming manager | Date of appointment |
|---|---|---|---|---|---|---|
| Nancy | (France) Jean-Louis Garcia | End of contract | 20 May 2021 | Pre-season | (Germany) Daniel Stendel | 20 May 2021 |
| Dunkerque | (France) Fabien Mercadal | Mutual consent | 31 May 2021 | Pre-season | (France) Romain Revelli | 31 May 2021 |
| Toulouse | (France) Patrice Garande | Sacked | 2 June 2021 | Pre-season | (France) Philippe Montanier | 23 June 2021 |
| Amiens | (France) Oswald Tanchot | Mutual consent | 16 June 2021 | Pre-season | (France) Philippe Hinschberger | 16 June 2021 |
| Grenoble | (France) Philippe Hinschberger | Signed by Amiens | 16 June 2021 | Pre-season | (Switzerland) Maurizio Jacobacci | 18 June 2021 |
| Paris FC | (France) René Girard | Resigned | 18 June 2021 | Pre-season | (France) Thierry Laurey | 20 June 2021 |
| Caen | (France) Fabrice Vandeputte | End of tenure as caretaker | 30 June 2021 | Pre-season | (France) Stéphane Moulin | 1 July 2021 |
| Guingamp | (France) Frédéric Bompard | End of tenure as caretaker | 30 June 2021 | Pre-season | (France) Stéphane Dumont | 1 July 2021 |
| Dijon | (France) David Linarès | Sacked | 23 August 2021 | 19th | (France) Patrice Garande | 23 August 2021 |
| Bastia | (France) Mathieu Chabert | Sacked | 22 September 2021 | 18th | (France) Régis Brouard | 2 October 2021 |
| Nancy | (Germany) Daniel Stendel | Sacked | 25 September 2021 | 20th | (France) Benoît Pedretti (caretaker) | 25 September 2021 |
| Valenciennes | (France) Olivier Guégan | Sacked | 5 November 2021 | 16th | (France) Christophe Delmotte (caretaker) | 5 November 2021 |
| Grenoble | (Switzerland) Maurizio Jacobacci | Sacked | 14 December 2021 | 15th | (France) Vincent Hognon | 29 December 2021 |
| Quevilly-Rouen | (France) Bruno Irles | Signed by Troyes | 3 January 2022 | 11th | (France) Fabien Mercadal | 4 January 2022 |
| Nancy | (France) Benoît Pedretti | End of tenure as caretaker | 3 January 2022 | 20th | (France) Albert Cartier | 3 January 2022 |
| Nîmes | (France) Pascal Plancque | Sacked | 4 January 2022 | 12th | (France) Nicolas Usaï | 4 January 2022 |

== League table ==
| Pos | Team | Pld | W | D | L | GF | GA | GD | Pts | Promotion or Relegation |
|---|---|---|---|---|---|---|---|---|---|---|
| 1 | Toulouse (C, P) | 38 | 23 | 10 | 5 | 82 | 33 | +49 | 79 | Promotion to Ligue 1 |
| 2 | Ajaccio (P) | 38 | 22 | 9 | 7 | 39 | 19 | +20 | 75 | Promotion to Ligue 1 |
| 3 | Auxerre (O, P) | 38 | 21 | 11 | 6 | 61 | 39 | +22 | 74 | Qualification to promotion play-offs |
| 4 | Paris FC | 38 | 20 | 10 | 8 | 54 | 35 | +19 | 70 | Qualification to promotion play-offs |
| 5 | Sochaux | 38 | 19 | 11 | 8 | 47 | 34 | +13 | 68 | Qualification to promotion play-offs |
| 6 | Guingamp | 38 | 15 | 13 | 10 | 52 | 48 | +4 | 58 | |
| 7 | Caen | 38 | 13 | 11 | 14 | 51 | 42 | +9 | 50 | |
| 8 | Le Havre | 38 | 13 | 11 | 14 | 38 | 41 | −3 | 50 | |
| 9 | Nîmes | 38 | 14 | 7 | 17 | 44 | 51 | −7 | 49 | |
| 10 | Pau | 38 | 14 | 7 | 17 | 41 | 49 | −8 | 49 | |
| 11 | Dijon | 38 | 13 | 8 | 17 | 48 | 53 | −5 | 47 | |
| 12 | Bastia | 38 | 10 | 16 | 12 | 38 | 36 | +2 | 46 | |
| 13 | Niort | 38 | 12 | 10 | 16 | 39 | 42 | −3 | 46 | |
| 14 | Amiens | 38 | 9 | 17 | 12 | 43 | 41 | +2 | 44 | |
| 15 | Grenoble | 38 | 12 | 8 | 18 | 32 | 44 | −12 | 44 | |
| 16 | Valenciennes | 38 | 10 | 14 | 14 | 34 | 47 | −13 | 44 | |
| 17 | Rodez | 38 | 10 | 13 | 15 | 32 | 42 | −10 | 43 | |
| 18 | Quevilly-Rouen (O) | 38 | 10 | 10 | 18 | 33 | 50 | −17 | 40 | Qualification for the relegation play-offs |
| 19 | Dunkerque (R) | 38 | 8 | 7 | 23 | 28 | 53 | −25 | 31 | Relegation to Championnat National |
| 20 | Nancy (R) | 38 | 6 | 9 | 23 | 32 | 69 | −37 | 27 | Relegation to Championnat National |

Source: Ligue 2
Rules for classification: 1) Points; 2) Goal difference; 3) Number of goals scored; 4) Head-to-head goal difference; 5) Fair play points
(C) Champions; (O) Play-off winners; (P) Promoted; (R) Relegated

== Results ==
| Home \ Away | AJA | AMI | AUX | BAS | CAE | DIJ | DUN | GRE | GUI | HAC | NAN | NIM | NIO | QUE | PFC | PAU | ROD | SOC | TFC | VAL |
|---|---|---|---|---|---|---|---|---|---|---|---|---|---|---|---|---|---|---|---|---|
| Ajaccio | — | 3–1 | 0–0 | 0–1 | 2–0 | 1–0 | 2–1 | 1–0 | 0–1 | 2–1 | 2–0 | 1–0 | 0–0 | 0–1 | 1–0 | 2–1 | 2–1 | 1–0 | 1–0 | 0–0 |
| Amiens | 0–1 | — | 1–2 | 0–0 | 0–0 | 1–1 | 3–0 | 4–1 | 3–0 | 0–2 | 1–0 | 3–0 | 3–1 | 1–3 | 1–2 | 2–2 | 0–1 | 0–0 | 0–0 | 3–0 |
| Auxerre | 0–0 | 2–1 | — | 1–0 | 2–2 | 2–1 | 1–0 | 3–0 | 1–2 | 2–3 | 1–1 | 2–2 | 4–0 | 1–0 | 1–2 | 4–1 | 1–0 | 3–2 | 1–2 | 1–0 |
| Bastia | 2–0 | 0–0 | 1–1 | — | 1–1 | 0–0 | 1–0 | 0–0 | 1–2 | 0–0 | 1–1 | 1–1 | 2–0 | 3–0 | 2–1 | 1–1 | 0–1 | 2–2 | 0–0 | 1–1 |
| Caen | 2–0 | 1–1 | 1–1 | 2–1 | — | 0–1 | 2–1 | 0–1 | 2–0 | 2–2 | 1–0 | 4–0 | 0–2 | 2–0 | 0–1 | 1–2 | 4–0 | 1–2 | 4–1 | 1–2 |
| Dijon | 0–3 | 1–0 | 3–1 | 2–1 | 1–0 | — | 2–0 | 1–0 | 3–3 | 2–0 | 2–3 | 1–2 | 2–2 | 1–0 | 0–1 | 0–1 | 1–1 | 1–3 | 2–4 | 0–1 |
| Dunkerque | 0–1 | 0–0 | 0–2 | 2–0 | 1–1 | 2–1 | — | 0–3 | 2–3 | 1–0 | 0–0 | 0–2 | 1–2 | 1–1 | 1–1 | 1–0 | 2–0 | 0–0 | 0–2 | 1–2 |
| Grenoble | 1–1 | 1–1 | 0–1 | 1–1 | 0–2 | 1–2 | 1–0 | — | 0–0 | 1–2 | 4–1 | 2–1 | 1–0 | 2–0 | 0–4 | 2–0 | 0–0 | 1–3 | 0–2 | 3–0 |
| Guingamp | 1–1 | 0–2 | 1–1 | 2–3 | 2–1 | 3–2 | 2–1 | 0–0 | — | 2–1 | 3–1 | 3–1 | 1–0 | 1–1 | 1–1 | 3–0 | 2–1 | 1–2 | 2–4 | 1–1 |
| Le Havre | 0–1 | 1–1 | 1–2 | 2–4 | 2–4 | 2–0 | 2–1 | 0–1 | 0–0 | — | 1–0 | 0–1 | 2–1 | 1–0 | 1–2 | 1–0 | 0–0 | 0–1 | 1–1 | 0–0 |
| Nancy | 0–2 | 1–1 | 1–4 | 2–1 | 1–1 | 0–3 | 2–0 | 0–1 | 2–1 | 1–1 | — | 1–3 | 0–2 | 0–3 | 3–0 | 2–3 | 0–2 | 0–0 | 0–4 | 0–1 |
| Nîmes | 0–2 | 3–3 | 1–2 | 0–2 | 0–0 | 2–1 | 0–1 | 3–1 | 0–2 | 0–1 | 2–1 | — | 1–2 | 2–1 | 1–1 | 0–0 | 3–2 | 1–3 | 1–2 | 2–1 |
| Niort | 0–1 | 0–0 | 0–1 | 1–1 | 0–1 | 1–3 | 2–0 | 1–0 | 2–0 | 0–0 | 1–3 | 0–0 | — | 2–0 | 4–1 | 3–0 | 0–2 | 1–1 | 2–1 | 1–2 |
| Quevilly-Rouen | 0–0 | 1–1 | 0–0 | 1–2 | 2–2 | 2–1 | 3–1 | 1–0 | 2–2 | 0–2 | 2–1 | 0–1 | 0–3 | — | 0–1 | 1–2 | 2–0 | 0–2 | 0–0 | 1–1 |
| Paris FC | 2–0 | 1–0 | 1–1 | 1–0 | 1–0 | 2–2 | 2–1 | 2–0 | 0–1 | 2–2 | 1–1 | 2–0 | 2–0 | 3–0 | — | 1–1 | 1–0 | 3–1 | 2–2 | 1–1 |
| Pau | 1–0 | 2–1 | 1–4 | 2–0 | 1–0 | 2–0 | 1–2 | 0–1 | 2–0 | 2–1 | 2–1 | 0–3 | 2–2 | 1–2 | 1–0 | — | 4–0 | 0–1 | 0–1 | 1–1 |
| Rodez | 0–2 | 1–1 | 1–3 | 0–0 | 2–0 | 0–2 | 2–2 | 1–1 | 1–1 | 0–0 | 1–1 | 1–0 | 1–1 | 3–0 | 0–1 | 1–0 | — | 0–1 | 1–0 | 0–0 |
| Sochaux | 0–1 | 1–1 | 0–0 | 2–1 | 3–2 | 2–2 | 1–0 | 1–0 | 1–0 | 0–2 | 1–0 | 0–1 | 1–0 | 1–1 | 2–0 | 2–1 | 2–0 | — | 1–1 | 1–1 |
| Toulouse | 2–2 | 6–0 | 6–0 | 1–0 | 2–3 | 4–1 | 2–0 | 4–1 | 2–2 | 4–0 | 4–0 | 2–1 | 2–0 | 2–0 | 2–1 | 1–1 | 1–1 | 4–1 | — | 1–0 |
| Valenciennes | 0–0 | 0–2 | 1–2 | 2–1 | 1–1 | 0–0 | 1–3 | 1–0 | 1–1 | 0–1 | 6–1 | 0–3 | 0–0 | 1–2 | 1–4 | 1–0 | 1–4 | 1–0 | 1–3 | — |

Source: Ligue 2
Legend: Blue = home team win; Yellow = draw; Red = away team win.

== Promotion play-offs ==
A promotion play-off competition was held at the end of the season, involving the 3rd, 4th and 5th-placed teams in 2021–22 Ligue 2, and the 18th-placed team in 2021–22 Ligue 1.

The quarter-final was played on 18 May and the semi-final was played on 21 May.

Quarter-final
4B | Paris FC | 1
5B | Sochaux | 2

Semi-final
3B | Auxerre (p) | 0 (5)
5B | Sochaux | 0 (4)

Final
3B | Auxerre (p) | 1 | 1 | 2 (5)
18A | Saint-Étienne | 1 | 1 | 2 (4)

Round 1

17 May 2022
20:30 CEST (UTC+2)

| Paris FC | 1–2 | Sochaux |
|---|---|---|
| Siby 8' | Report | Ambri 45+1'; Do Couto 90+2' |

Stade Charléty, Paris
Attendance: 8,000
Referee: Jérémie Pignard

Round 2

20 May 2022
20:30 CEST (UTC+2)

| Auxerre | 0–0 (a.e.t.) | Sochaux |
|---|---|---|
| | Report |
Penalties
| Dugimont (penalty scored); Jubal (penalty scored); Perrin (penalty scored); Charbonnier (penalty scored); Touré (penalty scored) | 5–4 | (penalty scored) Pogba; (penalty scored) Henry; (penalty missed) Kitala; (penalty scored) Virginius; (penalty scored) Ambri |

Stade de l'Abbé-Deschamps, Auxerre
Referee: Jérôme Brisard

Promotion Play-off Final
1st leg

26 May 2022
19:00 CEST (UTC+2)

| Auxerre | 1–1 | Saint-Étienne |
|---|---|---|
| Perrin 86' | Report | Youssouf 15' |

Stade de l'Abbé-Deschamps, Auxerre
Referee: Benoît Millot

2nd leg

29 May 2022
19:00 CEST (UTC+2)

| Saint-Étienne | 1–1 (a.e.t.) | Auxerre |
|---|---|---|
| Camara 76' | Report | Sakhi 51' |
Penalties
| Boudebouz (penalty missed); Nordin (penalty scored); Trauco (penalty scored); Dioussé (penalty scored); Bouanga (penalty scored) | 4–5 | (penalty scored) Dugimont; (penalty scored) Jubal; (penalty scored) Perrin; (penalty scored) Charbonnier; (penalty scored) Touré |

Stade Geoffroy-Guichard, Saint-Étienne
Referee: Antony Gautier

2–2 on aggregate, Auxerre won 5–4 on penalties and were promoted to 2022–23 Ligue 1; Saint-Étienne were relegated to 2022–23 Ligue 2.

== Relegation play-offs ==
A relegation play-off was held at the end of the season between the 18th-placed team of the 2021–22 Ligue 2 and the 3rd-placed team of the 2021–22 Championnat National. This was played over two legs on 24 and 29 May.

First leg

24 May 2022
20:30 CEST (UTC+2)

| Villefranche | 1–3 | Quevilly-Rouen |
|---|---|---|
| Elisor 28' (pen.) | Report | Soumaré 30', 73'; Padovani 79' |

Stade Armand Chouffet, Villefranche-sur-Saône
Referee: Abdelatif Kherradji

Second leg

29 May 2022
16:00 CEST (UTC+2)

| Quevilly-Rouen | 2–0 | Villefranche |
|---|---|---|
| Nazon 50', 81' | Report |

Stade Robert-Dionchon, Le Petit-Quevilly
Referee: Alexandre Perreau Niel

Quevilly-Rouen won 5–1 on aggregate and therefore both clubs remained in their respective leagues.

== Statistics ==
=== Top goalscorers ===
| Rank | Player | Club | Goals |
|---|---|---|---|
| 1 | (England) Rhys Healey | Toulouse | 20 |
| 2 | (Guinea-Bissau) Alexandre Mendy | Caen | 16 |
| 3 | (France) Gaëtan Charbonnier | Auxerre | 14 |
| 4 | (Netherlands) Branco van den Boomen | Toulouse | 12 |
| 5 | (Guinea) Morgan Guilavogui | Paris FC | 11 |
| 5 | (Senegal) Aliou Badji | Amiens | 11 |
| 5 | (Haiti) Frantzdy Pierrot | Guingamp | 11 |
| 8 | (Morocco) Yassine Benrahou | Nîmes | 10 |
| 8 | (Brazil) Rafael Ratão | Toulouse | 10 |
| 8 | (France) Aurélien Scheidler | Dijon | 10 |
| 8 | (Japan) Ado Onaiwu | Toulouse | 10 |

== Awards ==
=== Monthly ===
| Month | Player of the Month | | Ref. |
| Month | Player | Club | Ref. |
|---|---|---|---|
| August | (Guinea-Bissau) Alexandre Mendy | Caen | |
| September | (France) Gaëtan Charbonnier | Auxerre | |
| October | (Comoros) Youssouf M'Changama | Guingamp | |
| November | (England) Rhys Healey | Toulouse | |
| December | (Guinea) Morgan Guilavogui | Paris FC | |
| January | (France) Aldo Kalulu | Ajaccio | |
| February | (Netherlands) Branco van den Boomen | Toulouse | |
| March | (Netherlands) Branco van den Boomen | Toulouse | |
| April | (England) Rhys Healey | Toulouse | |

=== Annual ===
| Award | Winner | Club | Ref. |
|---|---|---|---|
| Player of the Season | (Netherlands) Branco van den Boomen | Toulouse | |
| Goalkeeper of the Season | (France) Benjamin Leroy | Ajaccio | |
| Goal of the Season | (Comoros) Youssouf M'Changama | Guingamp | |
| Manager of the Season | (France) Philippe Montanier | Toulouse | |
