= Jubal (footballer) =

Brazilian footballer (born 1999)

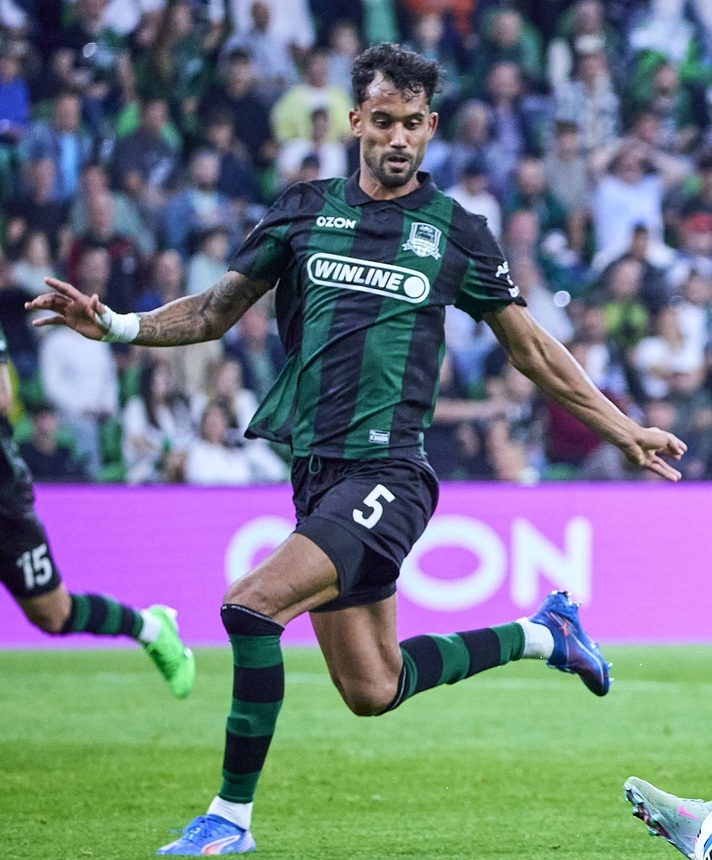
- Jubal with Krasnodar in 2025

Personal information
- Full name: Jubal Rocha Mendes Júnior
- Date of birth: 29 August 1993 (age 33)
- Place of birth: Inhumas, Brazil
- Height: 1.90 m (6 ft 3 in)
- Position: Centre-back

Team information
- Current team: Krasnodar
- Number: 5

Youth career
- 2011: Vila Nova
- 2011–2013: Santos

Senior career*
Years	Team	Apps	(Gls)
2011	Vila Nova	1	(0)
2013–2016	Santos	18	(1)
2015	→ Avaí (loan)	6	(0)
2016–2020	Arouca	44	(2)
2017–2018	→ Vitória Guimarães (loan)	24	(1)
2019	→ Boavista (loan)	13	(0)
2019–2020	Vitória de Setúbal	24	(2)
2020–2025	Auxerre	170	(19)
2025–	Krasnodar	26	(5)

International career
2013	Brazil U20	4	(0)
- * Club domestic league appearances and goals as of 22 November 2026

Jubal Rocha Mendes Júnior (born 29 August 1993), simply known as Jubal, is a Brazilian professional footballer who plays as a centre-back for Russian club Krasnodar.

== Club career ==
Born in Inhumas, Goiás, Jubal began his career on Vila Nova. He made his professional debut on 13 February 2011, against Aparecidense for the Campeonato Goiano championship.

In June, Jubal was transferred to Santos, being assigned to the youth setup. He made his debut for the club on 30 January 2013, starting in a 1–0 Campeonato Paulista away win against Ituano; it was his maiden appearance of the year.

Profiting from Edu Dracena's injury, Jubal started the first game of the 2014 campaign, a 1–0 home success over XV de Piracicaba on 18 January. Three days later he scored his first professional goal, netting the last through a header in a 1–1 away draw against Audax.

Jubal made his Série A debut on 20 April, coming on as a substitute for Neto in a 1–1 home draw against Sport Recife. On 11 June 2015 he was loaned to fellow league team Avaí, until the end of the year.

On 29 January 2016, Jubal rescinded with Santos and moved to Primera Liga side Arouca, with his former club retaining 50% of his federative rights. After being a regular starter, he moved to fellow league team Vitória de Guimarães on 18 August 2017, on a one-year loan deal.

On 2 September 2019, Jubal signed with Vitória de Setúbal.

On 28 May 2025, Jubal signed a two-year contract with Russian champions Krasnodar, beginning on 1 June 2025. On 2 September 2026, his Krasnodar contract was extended to June 2028.

== Career statistics ==
As of match played 22 November 2026

Appearances and goals by club, season and competition
Club	Season	League			State League		National cup		League cup		Continental		Other		Total	
Club	Season	Division	Apps	Goals	Apps	Goals	Apps	Goals	Apps	Goals	Apps	Goals	Apps	Goals	Apps	Goals
Vila Nova	2011	Série B	0	0	1	0	0	0	—		—		—		1	0
Santos	2013	Série A	0	0	1	0	0	0	—		—		—		1	0
Santos	2014	Série A	8	0	8	1	4	0	—		—		—		20	1
Santos	2015	Série A	0	0	1	0	0	0	—		—		—		1	0
Santos	Total		8	0	10	1	4	0	—		—		—		22	1
Avaí	2015	Série A	6	0	—		—		—		—		—		6	0
Arouca	2015–16	Primeira Liga	11	2	—		0	0	—		—		—		11	2
Arouca	2016–17	Primeira Liga	32	0	—		2	0	2 (Note: Appearance(s) in Taça da Liga)	0	4 (Note: Appearance(s) in UEFA Europa League)	0	—		40	0
Arouca	2017–18	LigaPro	1	0	—		0	0	2	0	—		—		3	0
Arouca	Total		44	2	—		2	0	4	0	4	0	—		54	2
Vitória de Guimarães (loan)	2017–18	Primeira Liga	24	1	—		1	0	1	0	6	0	—		32	1
Boavista (loan)	2018–19	Primeira Liga	13	0	—		—		—		—		—		13	0
Vitória de Setúbal	2019–20	Primeira Liga	24	2	—		1	0	2	0	—		—		27	2
Auxerre	2020–21	Ligue 2	34	2	—		0	0	—		—		—		34	2
Auxerre	2021–22	Ligue 2	36	2	—		2	0	—		—		3 (Note: One appearance in the Ligue 2 play-offs, two appearances in the Ligue 1 relegation/promotion play-offs)	0	41	2
Auxerre	2022–23	Ligue 1	37	3	—		3	1	—		—		—		40	4
Auxerre	2023–24	Ligue 2	33	6	—		2	0	—		—		—		35	6
Auxerre	2024–25	Ligue 1	30	6	—		0	0	—		—		—		30	6
Auxerre	Total		170	19	—		7	1	—		—		3	0	180	20
Krasnodar	2025–26	Russian Premier League	11	2	—		8	1	—		—		0	0	19	3
Krasnodar	2026–27	Russian Premier League	15	3	—		1	0	—		—		—		16	3
Krasnodar	Total		26	5	0	0	9	1	0	0	0	0	0	0	35	6
Career total			315	29	11	1	24	2	7	0	10	0	3	0	370	32

== Honours ==
Santos

- Campeonato Paulista: 2015
- Copa São Paulo de Futebol Júnior: 2013

Auxerre

- Ligue 2: 2023–24

Brazil U20

- Toulon Tournament: 2013
- Valais Youth Cup:2013

Individual

- UNFP Ligue 2 Team of the Year: 2023–24
- Russian Premier League goal of the month: July/August 2026 (against Dynamo Makhachkala, 23 August).
