= Sonny Laiton =

Malgasy footballer (born 2000)

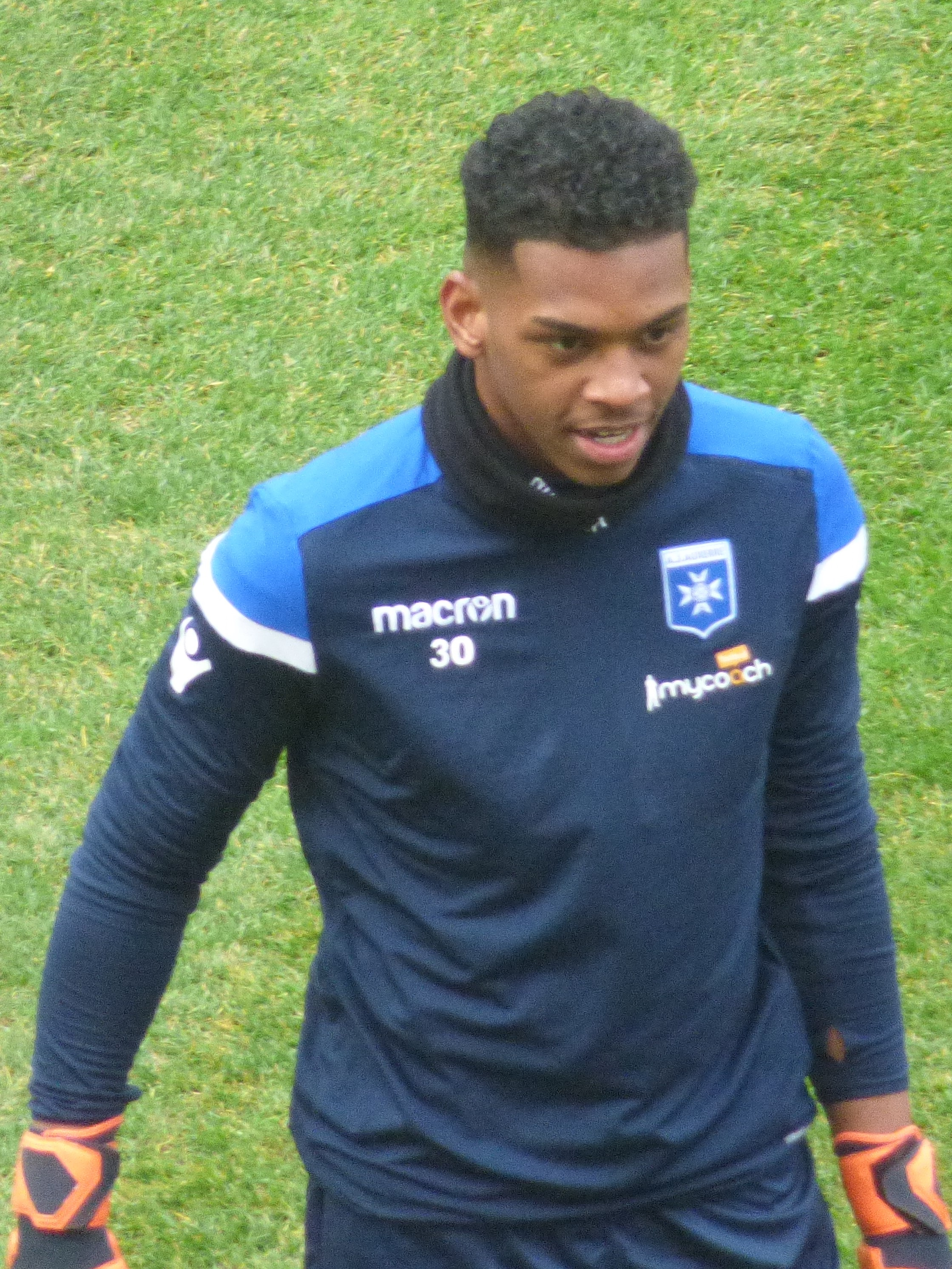
- Laiton with Auxerre in 2019

Personal information
- Full name: Sonny Patrick Arotiana Laiton
- Date of birth: 28 January 2000 (age 26)
- Place of birth: Saint-Louis, Réunion
- Height: 1.98 m (6 ft 6 in)
- Position: Goalkeeper

Team information
- Current team: Auxerre
- Number: 30

Youth career
- 2010–2011: RC Saint-Pierre
- 2011–2012: Ligne Paradis
- 2012–2013: AS Capricorne
- 2013–2015: Saint-Pierroise
- 2015–2017: Auxerre

Senior career*
Years	Team	Apps	(Gls)
2017–	Auxerre II	85	(0)
2020–2024	Auxerre	4	(0)
2023	→ Stade Briochin (loan)	16	(0)
2023	→ Stade Briochin II (loan)	2	(0)

International career^{‡}
2016	France U16	2	(0)
2016–2017	France U17	4	(0)
2018	France U19	1	(0)
2019	France U20	1	(0)
2024–	Madagascar	1	(0)
- * Club domestic league appearances and goals as of 19:08, 29 June 2024 (UTC) ‡ National team caps and goals as of 19:20, 7 June 2024 (UTC)

Sonny Patrick Arotiana Laiton (born 28 January 2000) is a professional footballer who plays for FC Avenir Beggen a club in the Luxembourg Division of Honour the second division in Luxembourg as a goalkeeper. Born in France, Laiton plays for the Madagascar national team.

== Club career ==
On 3 November 2017, Laiton signed his first professional contract with AJ Auxerre. He made his professional debut with AJ Auxerre in a 3–1 Coupe de la Ligue win over Gazélec Ajaccio on 14 August 2018. In January 2024, Laiton joined FC Avenir Beggen on a free after not playing football for half a season.

== International career ==
In early March 2024, Laiton was called up by the Madagascar national team.

== Honours ==
Auxerre

- Ligue 2: 2023–24
