= Paul Joly =

French footballer (born 2000)

Personal information
- Date of birth: 7 June 2000 (age 26)
- Place of birth: Orléans, France
- Height: 1.82 m (6 ft 0 in)
- Position: Centre-back

Team information
- Current team: 1. FC Kaiserslautern
- Number: 26

Youth career
- 2008–2009: Muides
- 2009–2015: Blois
- 2015–2018: Lorient

Senior career*
Years	Team	Apps	(Gls)
2018–2020	Amiens II	18	(1)
2020–2022	Auxerre II	20	(0)
2021–2026	Auxerre	79	(1)
2023	→ Dijon (loan)	19	(0)
2025–2026	→ 1. FC Kaiserslautern (loan)	29	(1)
2026–	1. FC Kaiserslautern	0	(0)
- * Club domestic league appearances and goals as of 18 May 2026

Paul Joly (born 7 June 2000) is a French professional footballer who plays as a centre-back for German 2. Bundesliga club 1. FC Kaiserslautern.

== Career ==
A youth product of Muides, Blois Football 41, and Lorient before joining the reserves Amiens in 2018. He signed his first professional contract with Auxerre on 18 October 2020. He made his professional debut with Auxerre in a 3–1 Coupe de France loss to Lille on 18 December 2021.

On 16 January 2023, Joly joined Dijon in Ligue 2 on loan until the end of the 2022–23 season.

On 26 August 2025, Joly moved on loan to 2. Bundesliga club 1.FC Kaiserslautern until the end of 2025–26 season.

== Honours ==
Auxerre

- Ligue 2: 2023–24

Individual

- UNFP Ligue 2 Team of the Year: 2023–24
