= 2022–23 AJ Auxerre season =

AJ Auxerre
2022–23 season
- Owner: James Zhou
- Head coach: Jean-Marc Furlan (until 11 October); Christophe Pélissier (from 26 October)
- Stadium: Stade de l'Abbé-Deschamps
- Ligue 1: 17th (relegated)
- Coupe de France: Round of 16
- Top goalscorer: League: M'Baye Niang (6); All: M'Baye Niang (7)
Home colours	Away colours

The 2022–23 season was the 118th season in the history of AJ Auxerre and their first season back in the top flight since 2012. The club participated in Ligue 1 and the Coupe de France. The season covers the period from 1 July 2022 to 30 June 2023.

== Players ==
=== First-team squad ===
As of 2 February 2023.

Note: Flags indicate national team as defined under FIFA eligibility rules; some limited exceptions apply. Players may hold more than one non-FIFA nationality.

No.	Pos.	Nation	Player
1	GK	ROU	Ionuț Radu (on loan from Inter Milan)
4	DF	BRA	Jubal
5	DF	FRA	Théo Pellenard
6	MF	COM	Youssouf M'Changama
7	FW	FRA	Gauthier Hein
8	MF	FRA	Ousoumane Camara
9	FW	CPV	Nuno da Costa
10	FW	FRA	Gaëtan Perrin
11	FW	SEN	M'Baye Niang
12	MF	MLI	Birama Touré (captain)
13	DF	ALG	Akim Zedadka (on loan from Lille)
14	DF	GHA	Gideon Mensah
16	GK	GUF	Donovan Léon
17	FW	MLI	Lassine Sinayoko
18	MF	MAR	Kays Ruiz-Atil
19	FW	FRA	Matthis Abline (on loan from Rennes)
21	FW	FRA	Rémy Dugimont

No.	Pos.	Nation	Player
22	MF	MAR	Hamza Sakhi
24	DF	MAD	Kenji-Van Boto
27	DF	GUI	Julian Jeanvier
28	FW	GUI	Ousmane Camara
29	MF	FRA	Mathias Autret
31	MF	FRA	Kylian Silvestre
32	DF	FRA	Dénys Bain
34	MF	FRA	Natanaël Bouekou
35	MF	FRA	Kévin Danois
36	FW	TOG	Idjessi Metsoko
37	GK	ITA	Vincenzo Cozzella
40	GK	MTQ	Théo De Percin
42	MF	GHA	Elisha Owusu
77	FW	SCO	Siriki Dembélé (on loan from Bournemouth)
80	MF	FRA	Han-Noah Massengo (on loan from Bristol City)
95	DF	FRA	Isaak Touré (on loan from Marseille)
97	MF	MAD	Rayan Raveloson

=== Out on loan ===
Note: Flags indicate national team as defined under FIFA eligibility rules; some limited exceptions apply. Players may hold more than one non-FIFA nationality.

No.	Pos.	Nation	Player
—	GK	FRA	Sonny Laiton (at Stade Briochin until 30 June 2023)
—	DF	FRA	Clément Akpa (at Orléans until 30 June 2023)
—	DF	FRA	Paul Joly (at Dijon until 30 June 2023)
—	DF	FRA	Alec Georgen (at Concarneau until 30 June 2023)

No.	Pos.	Nation	Player
—	DF	FRA	Brayann Pereira (at FBBP01 until 30 June 2023)
—	FW	TUN	Mohamed Ben Fredj (at Le Puy until 30 June 2023)
—	FW	FRA	Nicolas Mercier (at Avranches until 30 June 2023)

== Pre-season and friendlies ==
Win Draw Loss Fixtures

2 July 2022 Friendly	Auxerre (France)	1–2	(France) Grenoble	Saint-Priest
17:00 CEST (UTC+2)	Ben Fredj 60'		Ba 3'; Inikurogha 64'	Stadium: Stade Jacques Joly

9 July 2022 Friendly	Auxerre (France)	2–3	(France) Amiens	Châlons-en-Champagne
17:30 CEST (UTC+2)	Ben Fredj 46'; Ruiz-Atil 61'		Gomis 49'; Bianchini 53'; Doums 77'	Stadium: Stade René Sache

13 July 2022 Friendly	Auxerre (France)	3–2	(France) Orléans	Migennes
18:00 CEST (UTC+2)	Hein 34', 39'; Sinayoko 90'	Report	Gassama 11'; Lepaul 82'	Stadium: Stade Lucien Masson; Referee: Malki

16 July 2022 Friendly	Auxerre (France)	0–2	(France) Reims	Auxerre
18:00 CEST (UTC+2)		Report	Koeberlé 4'; Agbadou 40'	Stadium: Stade Pierre-Bouillot

20 July 2022 Friendly	Auxerre (France)	3–1	(France) UNFP	Migennes
18:00 CEST (UTC+2)	Perrin 29', 45'; Autret 35'	Report	Dembélé 15'	Stadium: Stade Lucien Masson; Referee: Lopez

23 July 2022 Friendly	Auxerre (France)	1–0	(France) Troyes	Auxerre
19:00 CEST (UTC+2)	Hein 75'			Stadium: Stade de l'Abbé Deschamps; Attendance: 4,662; Referee: Ben El Hadj

30 July 2022 Friendly	Auxerre (France)	3–2	(France) Red Star	Migennes
18:00 CEST (UTC+2)	Hein 2'; Autret 43'; Ruiz-Atil 66'		Dembi 55'; Macalou 72' (pen.)	Stadium: Stade Lucien Masson; Referee: Berté

9 December 2022 Friendly	Metz (France)	1–5	(France) Auxerre	Marly
--:-- CET (UTC+1)				Stadium: Centre d’entraînement Frescaty

21 December 2022 Friendly	Auxerre (France)	1–0	(Croatia) Hajduk Split	Auxerre
18:00 CET (UTC+1)				Stadium: Stade de l'Abbé Deschamps

== Competitions ==
=== Overall record ===
Competition	First match	Last match	Starting round	Final position	Record							
Competition	First match	Last match	Starting round	Final position	Pld	W	D	L	GF	GA	GD	Win %
Ligue 1	7 August 2022	3 June 2023	Matchday 1	17th	38	8	11	19	35	63	−28	21.05
Coupe de France	8 January 2023	8 February 2023	Round of 64	Round of 16	3	1	1	1	8	5	+3	33.33
Total					41	9	12	20	43	68	−25	21.95

Source: Soccerway

=== Ligue 1 ===
==== League table ====
Pos	Team	Pld	W	D	L	GF	GA	GD	Pts	Qualification or relegation
15	Strasbourg	38	9	13	16	51	59	−8	40	
16	Nantes	38	7	15	16	37	55	−18	36	
17	Auxerre (R)	38	8	11	19	35	63	−28	35	Relegation to Ligue 2
18	Ajaccio (R)	38	7	5	26	23	74	−51	26	Relegation to Ligue 2
19	Troyes (R)	38	4	12	22	45	81	−36	24	Relegation to Ligue 2

Source: Ligue 1
Rules for classification: 1) Points; 2) Goal difference; 3) Head-to-head points; 4) Head-to-head goal difference; 5) Head-to-head goals scored; 6) Head-to-head away goals scored; 7) Goals scored; 8) Away goals scored; 9) Fair-play points (Note: Head-to-head record is used only after all the matches between the teams in question have been played).
(R) Relegated

==== Results summary ====
Overall								Home						Away					
Pld	W	D	L	GF	GA	GD	Pts	W	D	L	GF	GA	GD	W	D	L	GF	GA	GD
38	8	11	19	35	63	−28	35	5	7	7	18	28	−10	3	4	12	17	35	−18

Source: Ligue 1

==== Results by round ====
Round	1	2	3	4	5	6	7	8	9	10	11	12	13	14	15	16	17	18	19	20	21	22	23	24	25	26	27	28	29	30	31	32	33	34	35	36	37	38
Ground	A	H	A	H	A	H	A	H	H	A	H	A	H	A	A	H	A	H	A	H	A	H	A	H	A	A	H	A	H	A	H	H	A	H	A	H	A	H
Result	L	D	W	W	L	L	L	L	D	L	D	L	W	D	L	L	L	L	L	L	L	D	D	W	W	D	D	L	W	W	W	D	L	D	L	L	D	L
Position	19	18	10	7	9	12	14	16	14	16	16	18	16	15	17	18	18	18	19	19	19	19	19	18	16	17	17	17	17	15	14	14	15	16	16	16	16	17

Source: Ligue 1
A = Away; H = Home; W = Win; D = Draw; L = Loss

==== Matches ====
The league fixtures were announced on 17 June 2022.

7 August 2022 1	Lille	4–1	Auxerre	Villeneuve-d'Ascq
15:00 CEST (UTC+2)	André 1'; David 3', 39'; Ang. Gomes (yellow card) 58'; Zedadka 64'; Djaló (yellow card) 74'	Report	Jeanvier (yellow card) 44'; Charbonnier 68'	Stadium: Stade Pierre-Mauroy; Attendance: 32,292; Referee: Eric Wattellier

14 August 2022 2	Auxerre	2–2	Angers	Auxerre
15:00 CEST (UTC+2)	Jeanvier 4'; Hountondji 10' (o.g.); Charbonnier (yellow card) 17'; Sinayoko (yellow card) 31' (yellow-red card) 57'; Joly (yellow card) 37'; Da Costa (yellow card) 69'	Report	Mendy (yellow card) 7'; Diony 22'; Ounahi (yellow card) 61'; Salama 77'; Šabanović (yellow card) 83'	Stadium: Stade de l'Abbé-Deschamps; Attendance: 15,577; Referee: Ruddy Buquet

21 August 2022 3	Montpellier	1–2	Auxerre	Montpellier
15:00 CEST (UTC+2)	Sakho 39', (yellow card) 73'; Fayad (red card) 46'; Savanier (red card) 90+4'	Report	Da Costa (yellow card) 5' (yellow-red card) 88', (goal) 70'; Joly (yellow card) 43'; Niang (red card) 51'; Autret 75' (pen.)	Stadium: Stade de la Mosson; Attendance: 13,137; Referee: Mathieu Vernice

27 August 2022 4	Auxerre	1–0	Strasbourg	Auxerre
17:00 CEST (UTC+2)	Perrin 29'	Report	Bellegarde (yellow card) 25'	Stadium: Stade de l'Abbé-Deschamps; Attendance: 16,059; Referee: Johan Hamel

31 August 2022 5	Lyon	2–1	Auxerre	Lyon
19:00 CEST (UTC+2)	Tetê 29'; Toko Ekambi 71'	Report	Ruiz-Atil (yellow card) 56'; Autret 79'; Perrin (yellow card) 90+2'	Stadium: Parc Olympique Lyonnais; Attendance: 38,609; Referee: Pierre Gaillouste

3 September 2022 6	Auxerre	0–2	Marseille	Auxerre
17:00 CEST (UTC+2)	Jubal (yellow card) 39'	Report	Gerson 8'; Sánchez 84'; Harit (yellow card) 90'	Stadium: Stade de l'Abbé-Deschamps; Attendance: 17,025; Referee: Willy Delajod

11 September 2022 7	Rennes	5–0	Auxerre	Rennes
17:05 CEST (UTC+2)	Sulemana 3'; Rodon (yellow card) 28'; Gouiri 60'; Terrier 68'; Tait 79'; Abline 85'	Report	Sakhi (yellow card) 82'	Stadium: Roazhon Park; Attendance: 27,837; Referee: Thomas Léonard

16 September 2022 8	Auxerre	1–3	Lorient	Auxerre
21:00 CEST (UTC+2)	Mensah (yellow card) 40'; Hein 50'; B. Touré (yellow card) 75'; Dugimont (yellow card) 83'	Report	Ouattara 15'; Moffi 37'; Le Fée 42'; Kalulu (yellow card) 59'	Stadium: Stade de l'Abbé-Deschamps; Attendance: 14,866; Referee: Ruddy Buquet

2 October 2022 9	Auxerre	1–1	Brest	Auxerre
15:00 CEST (UTC+2)	Sakhi (yellow card) 4'; Jeanvier (yellow card) 5' (yellow-red card) 52'; Niang (yellow card) 59', (goal) 86' (pen.)	Report	Slimani (yellow card) 25', (goal) 64'; Chardonnet (yellow card) 57'; Del Castillo (yellow card) 82'; Bizot (yellow card) 85'	Stadium: Stade de l'Abbé-Deschamps; Attendance: 14,630; Referee: Florent Batta

9 October 2022 10	Clermont	2–1	Auxerre	Clermont-Ferrand
15:00 CEST (UTC+2)	Khaoui 55'; Kyei 58'	Report	Jubal 90+1'	Stadium: Stade Gabriel Montpied; Attendance: 11,119; Referee: Mathieu Vernice

16 October 2022 11	Auxerre	1–1	Nice	Auxerre
15:00 CEST (UTC+2)	Da Costa 42'	Report	Delort 20'	Stadium: Stade de l'Abbé-Deschamps; Attendance: 14,125; Referee: Eric Wattellier

23 October 2022 12	Reims	2–1	Auxerre	Reims
15:00 CEST (UTC+2)	Locko (yellow card) 25'; Balogun 28'; Matusiwa (yellow card) 42'; Keita (yellow card) 74'; Ito 87'; Diouf (yellow card) 90+2'	Report	Niang 33'	Stadium: Stade Auguste-Delaune; Attendance: 11,411; Referee: Hakim Ben El Hadj

30 October 2022 13	Auxerre	1–0	Ajaccio	Auxerre
13:00 CEST (UTC+2)	Sakhi 4'; Jubal (yellow card) 23'; Niang (red card) 56'	Report	Vidal (yellow card) 39'; Avinel (red card) 62'	Stadium: Stade de l'Abbé-Deschamps; Attendance: 15,092; Referee: Benoît Millot

4 November 2022 14	Troyes	1–1	Auxerre	Troyes
21:00 CEST (UTC+2)	Salmier (yellow card) 17'; Lopes 72'; Ripart (yellow card) 72'	Report	Perrin 86'	Stadium: Stade de l'Aube; Attendance: 12,689; Referee: Pierre Gaillouste

13 November 2022 15	Paris Saint-Germain	5–0	Auxerre	Paris
13:00 CET (UTC+1)	Mbappé 11'; Soler 51'; Hakimi 57'; Sanches 81'; Ekitike 84'	Report		Stadium: Parc des Princes; Attendance: 45,000; Referee: Thomas Léonard

28 December 2022 16	Auxerre	2–3	Monaco	Auxerre
17:00 CET (UTC+1)	Niang 30' (pen.); Jeanvier (yellow card) 34'; Fofana 60' (o.g.)	Report	Ben Yedder 45+3' (pen.); Ben Seghir 58', 85'	Stadium: Stade de l'Abbé-Deschamps; Attendance: 16,503; Referee: Marc Bollengier

1 January 2023 17	Nantes	1–0	Auxerre	Nantes
15:00 CET (UTC+1)	Coco 74'; Moutoussamy (yellow card) 90+1'	Report	Mensah (yellow card) 21'; Camara (yellow card) 82'	Stadium: Stade de la Beaujoire; Attendance: 23,266; Referee: Benoît Bastien

11 January 2023 18	Auxerre	0–5	Toulouse	Auxerre
19:00 CET (UTC+1)	Niang (yellow card) 43'; Mensah (yellow card) 55'; Jubal (yellow card) 88'	Report	Chaïbi 4'; Rouault 33'; Van den Boomen 41' (pen.); Sylla (yellow card) 44'; Aboukhlal 75'; Dallinga 88'	Stadium: Stade de l'Abbé-Deschamps; Attendance: 12,405; Referee: Florent Batta

14 January 2023 19	Lens	1–0	Auxerre	Lens
17:00 CET (UTC+1)	Danso (yellow card) 26'; Medina (yellow card) 53'; Frankowski 58' (pen.)	Report	B. Touré (yellow card) 53' (yellow-red card) 64'; Da Costa (yellow card) 90'	Stadium: Stade Bollaert-Delelis; Attendance: 38,208; Referee: Willy Delajod

29 January 2023 20	Auxerre	0–2	Montpellier	Auxerre
15:00 CET (UTC+1)	Mensah (yellow card) 54'; B. Touré (penalty missed) 90+4'	Report	Tchato (yellow card) 40'; Leroy (yellow card) 60'; Mavididi 62', 80', (yellow card) 67'	Stadium: Stade de l'Abbé-Deschamps; Attendance: 14,206; Referee: Jérémy Stinat

1 February 2023 21	Monaco	3–2	Auxerre	Monaco
21:00 CET (UTC+1)	Ben Yedder 11'; Ben Seghir 30'; Embolo 82'	Report	Abline 68'; Da Costa 84'	Stadium: Stade Louis II; Attendance: 3,561; Referee: Eric Wattellier

5 February 2023 22	Auxerre	0–0	Reims	Auxerre
15:00 CET (UTC+1)	Mensah (yellow card) 22'; Jubal (yellow card) 37'	Report		Stadium: Stade de l'Abbé-Deschamps; Attendance: 14,680; Referee: Pierre Gaillouste

12 February 2023 23	Angers	1–1	Auxerre	Angers
15:00 CET (UTC+1)	Raveloson 2' (o.g.); Bentaleb (yellow card) 62'; Blažič (yellow card) 90'	Report	Abline 22' (pen.)	Stadium: Stade Raymond Kopa; Attendance: 7,873; Referee: Thomas Léonard

17 February 2023 24	Auxerre	2–1	Lyon	Auxerre
21:00 CET (UTC+1)	Da Costa (yellow card) 38'; Perrin 51' (pen.); Jubal 53'; Massengo (yellow card) 54'; B. Touré (yellow card) 68'; Hein (yellow card) 90+4'	Report	Dembélé 36'; Barcola (yellow card) 83'; Lepenant (yellow card) 90+5'	Stadium: Stade de l'Abbé-Deschamps; Attendance: 16,396; Referee: Jérôme Brisard

26 February 2023 25	Lorient	0–1	Auxerre	Lorient
13:00 CET (UTC+1)	Meïté (yellow card) 56'; Abergel (yellow card) 77'	Report	B. Touré (yellow card) 32'; Raveloson 58'; Dembélé (yellow card) 67'; Massengo (yellow card) 77'	Stadium: Stade du Moustoir; Attendance: 13,089; Referee: Benoît Millot

3 March 2023 26	Nice	1–1	Auxerre	Nice
21:00 CET (UTC+1)	Laborde (penalty missed) 42', 45+1'	Report	Hein 36'; Zedadka (yellow card) 41'	Stadium: Allianz Riviera; Attendance: 21,133; Referee: Bastien Dechepy

11 March 2023 27	Auxerre	0–0	Rennes	Auxerre
17:00 CET (UTC+1)	Zedadka (yellow card) 68'; I. Touré (yellow card) 79'	Report	Wooh (yellow card) 10'; Meling (yellow card) 84'	Stadium: Stade de l'Abbé-Deschamps; Attendance: 15,695; Referee: Mathieu Vernice

19 March 2023 28	Strasbourg	2–0	Auxerre	Strasbourg
15:00 CET (UTC+1)	Nyamsi 4'; Diallo (penalty missed) 21', 84'; Perrin (yellow card) 43'; Liénard (yellow card) 55'	Report	I. Touré (yellow card) 18'	Stadium: Stade de la Meinau; Attendance: 25,530; Referee: Eric Wattellier

2 April 2023 29	Auxerre	1–0	Troyes	Auxerre
17:00 CEST (UTC+2)	Niang 73'	Report		Stadium: Stade de l'Abbé-Deschamps; Attendance: 16,512; Referee: Jérôme Brisard

9 April 2023 30	Ajaccio	0–3	Auxerre	Ajaccio
15:00 CEST (UTC+2)	Diallo (yellow card) 49'	Report	B. Touré 2'; Jeanvier (yellow card) 4'; Da Costa 5'; Alphonse 45+1' (o.g.); M'Changama (yellow card) 65'; Zedadka (yellow card) 86'	Stadium: Stade François Coty; Attendance: 6,742; Referee: Bastien Dechepy

16 April 2023 31	Auxerre	2–1	Nantes	Auxerre
15:00 CEST (UTC+2)	Jubal 5' (pen.); Zedadka (yellow card) 33'; Da Costa 43'; I. Touré (yellow card) 90+4'	Report	João Victor (yellow card) 36'; Mohamed 55'; Pallois (yellow card) 89'	Stadium: Stade de l'Abbé-Deschamps; Attendance: 15,714; Referee: Eric Wattellier

22 April 2023 32	Auxerre	1–1	Lille	Auxerre
17:00 CEST (UTC+2)	Niang 62' (pen.)	Report	Fonte (yellow card) 27'; David 36' (pen.)	Stadium: Stade de l'Abbé-Deschamps; Attendance: 16,779; Referee: Stéphanie Frappart

30 April 2023 33	Marseille	2–1	Auxerre	Marseille
20:45 CEST (UTC+2)	Sánchez (yellow card) 40', (goal) 76'; Ünder 74'	Report	B. Touré 32'	Stadium: Stade Vélodrome; Attendance: 64,523; Referee: Jérémie Pignard

7 May 2023 34	Auxerre	1–1	Clermont	Auxerre
15:00 CEST (UTC+2)	I. Touré 36'; Zedadka (yellow card) 88'	Report	Khaoui 54'	Stadium: Stade de l'Abbé-Deschamps; Attendance: 16,330; Referee: Marc Bollengier

14 May 2023 35	Brest	1–0	Auxerre	Brest
15:00 CEST (UTC+2)	Le Douaron 69'	Report		Stadium: Stade Francis-Le Blé; Attendance: 15,028; Referee: Eric Wattelier

21 May 2023 36	Auxerre	1–2	Paris Saint-Germain	Auxerre
20:45 CEST (UTC+2)	Jubal (yellow card) 46'; Sinayoko 51'	Report	Mbappé 6', 8'	Stadium: Stade de l'Abbé-Deschamps; Attendance: 16,682; Referee: Benoît Bastien

27 May 2023 37	Toulouse	1–1	Auxerre	Toulouse
21:00 CEST (UTC+2)	Aboukhlal 44'; Spierings (yellow card) 71'	Report	Massengo (yellow card) 18'; Raveloson 24'; Abline (yellow card) 84'	Stadium: Stadium de Toulouse; Attendance: 25,172; Referee: Mathieu Vernice

3 June 2023 38	Auxerre	1–3	Lens	Auxerre
21:00 CEST (UTC+2)	Jubal (yellow card) 27'; Niang 71'	Report	Abdul Samed (yellow card) 6'; Claude-Maurice 19', 48'; Haïdara (yellow card) 69'; Openda 78'; Gradit (yellow card) 83'	Stadium: Stade de l'Abbé-Deschamps; Attendance: 17,246; Referee: Benoît Millot

=== Coupe de France ===
8 January 2023 Round of 64	USL Dunkerque	2–2 (4–5 p)	Auxerre	Dunkirk
18:00 CET (UTC+1)	Baghdadi 5'; Thiam (yellow card) 25'; Keita (yellow card) 33'; Ipiélé 68'	Report	Raveloson 19', 35'; Hein (yellow card) 43'	Stadium: Stade Marcel-Tribut; Attendance: 4,000; Referee: François Letexier
	Penalties
	Baghdadi (penalty scored); Bilingi (penalty scored); Ipiélé (penalty scored); Pierre (penalty missed); Ghrieb (penalty scored)		(penalty scored) Niang; (penalty scored) Jubal; (penalty scored) Jeanvier; (penalty scored) Perrin; (penalty scored) Touré

22 January 2023 Round of 32	Niort	0–4	Auxerre	Niort
18:30 CET (UTC+1)		Report	Sakhi (yellow card) 34'; Perrin 39', 67'; Da Costa 43'; Abline 64'	Stadium: Stade René Gaillard; Attendance: 2,429; Referee: Ruddy Buquet

8 February 2023 Round of 16	Auxerre	2–3	Rodez	Auxerre
18:15 CET (UTC+1)	Niang 45+2'; Sakhi (yellow card) 65'; Bain (yellow card) 75'; Jubal 90+1'	Report	Mendes 3'; Valério (yellow card) 61'; Corredor 68'; Park Jung-bin 76' (pen.); Adeline (yellow card) 90+5'	Stadium: Stade de l'Abbé-Deschamps; Attendance: 5,322; Referee: Stéphanie Frappart
