= 2018–19 Stade Brestois 29 season =

Stade Brestois 29
2018–19 season
- President: Denis Le Saint
- Head coach: Jean-Marc Furlan
- Stadium: Stade Francis-Le Blé
- Ligue 2: 2nd (promoted)
- Coupe de France: Round of 64
- Coupe de la Ligue: Second round
- Top goalscorer: League: Gaëtan Charbonnier (27); All: Gaëtan Charbonnier (30)
Home colours	Away colours

The 2018–19 season was the 69th season in the existence of Stade Brestois 29 and the club's sixth consecutive season in the second division of French football. In addition to the domestic league, Brest participated in this season's editions of the Coupe de France and the Coupe de la Ligue.

== Players ==
=== First-team squad ===
As of 4 March 2019

Note: Flags indicate national team as defined under FIFA eligibility rules; some limited exceptions apply. Players may hold more than one non-FIFA nationality.

No.	Pos.	Nation	Player
1	GK	FRA	Gautier Larsonneur
2	DF	FRA	Quentin Bernard
3	MF	ITA	Christian Battocchio
4	DF	FRA	Guillaume Buon
5	DF	FRA	Brendan Chardonnet
6	MF	FRA	Jessy Pi (on loan from Toulouse)
7	MF	ALG	Haris Belkebla
8	MF	FRA	Yoann Court
9	FW	FRA	Kévin Mayi
10	FW	FRA	Gaëtan Charbonnier
11	FW	FRA	Édouard Butin
12	MF	FRA	Pierre Magnon
14	DF	FRA	Anthony Weber

No.	Pos.	Nation	Player
15	DF	FRA	Baba Traoré (on loan from Le Havre)
16	GK	GUF	Donovan Léon
17	DF	FRA	Valentin Henry
18	MF	FRA	Ibrahima Diallo (on loan from Monaco)
19	MF	FRA	Ferris N'Goma
20	DF	FRA	Gaëtan Belaud
21	DF	CMR	Jean-Charles Castelletto
22	MF	FRA	Julien Faussurier
23	MF	FRA	Mathias Autret
24	MF	FRA	Thomas Ayasse
27	MF	FRA	Hugo Magnetti
29	MF	FRA	Derick Osei (on loan from Toulouse)
30	GK	FRA	Julien Fabri

=== Out on loan ===
Note: Flags indicate national team as defined under FIFA eligibility rules; some limited exceptions apply. Players may hold more than one non-FIFA nationality.

No.	Pos.	Nation	Player
13	DF	BEN	David Kiki (on loan to Red Star)
25	MF	FRA	Corentin Jacob (on loan to Tours)

== Competitions ==
=== Overview ===
Competition	First match	Last match	Starting round	Final position	Record							
Competition	First match	Last match	Starting round	Final position	Pld	W	D	L	GF	GA	GD	Win %
Ligue 2	30 July 2018	17 May 2019	Matchday 1	2nd	38	24	9	5	64	35	+29	63.16
Coupe de France	17 November 2018	6 January 2019	Seventh round	Round of 64	3	2	1	0	9	5	+4	66.67
Coupe de la Ligue	14 August 2018	28 August 2018	First round	Second round	2	0	2	0	4	4	+0	0.00
Total					43	26	12	5	77	44	+33	60.47

Source: Soccerway

=== Ligue 2 ===
==== League table ====
Pos	Team	Pld	W	D	L	GF	GA	GD	Pts	Promotion or Relegation
1	Metz (C, P)	38	24	9	5	60	23	+37	81	Promotion to Ligue 1
2	Brest (P)	38	21	11	6	64	35	+29	74	Promotion to Ligue 1
3	Troyes	38	21	8	9	51	28	+23	71	Qualification to promotion play-offs semi-final
4	Paris FC	38	17	14	7	36	22	+14	65	Qualification to promotion play-offs quarter-final
5	Lens	38	18	9	11	49	28	+21	63	Qualification to promotion play-offs quarter-final

Source: Ligue 2
Rules for classification: 1) Points; 2) Goal difference; 3) Number of goals scored; 4) Head-to-head goal difference; 5) Fair play points
(C) Champions; (P) Promoted

==== Results summary ====
Overall								Home						Away					
Pld	W	D	L	GF	GA	GD	Pts	W	D	L	GF	GA	GD	W	D	L	GF	GA	GD
38	21	11	6	64	35	+29	74	13	4	2	38	16	+22	8	7	4	26	19	+7

Source: Ligue 2

==== Results by round ====
Round	1	2	3	4	5	6	7	8	9	10	11	12	13	14	15	16	17	18	19	20	21	22	23	24	25	26	27	28	29	30	31	32	33	34	35	36	37	38
Ground	H	A	H	A	H	A	H	A	H	A	H	A	H	H	A	H	A	H	A	H	A	H	A	H	A	H	A	H	A	H	A	A	H	A	H	A	H	A
Result	L	W	D	L	W	W	W	W	W	W	W	D	D	W	D	W	L	W	D	D	W	W	D	W	D	W	D	L	D	D	W	W	W	W	W	L	W	L
Position	16	10	10	13	10	7	4	4	3	3	3	3	2	2	2	2	2	2	2	2	2	2	2	2	2	2	2	2	2	2	2	2	2	2	2	2	2	2

Source: Ligue 2
A = Away; H = Home; W = Win; D = Draw; L = Loss

==== Matches ====
The league fixtures were announced on 7 June 2018.

30 July 2018 1	Brest	0–1	Metz	Brest
20:45 CEST (UTC+2)		Report	Niane 13'	Stadium: Stade Francis-Le Blé; Referee: Eric Wattellier

3 August 2018 2	Troyes	1–2	Brest	Troyes
--:-- CEST (UTC+2)				Stadium: Stade de l'Aube

10 August 2018 3	Brest	1–1	Paris FC	Brest
--:-- CEST (UTC+2)				Stadium: Stade Francis-Le Blé

17 August 2018 4	Sochaux	2–0	Brest	Montbéliard
--:-- CEST (UTC+2)				Stadium: Stade Auguste Bonal

24 August 2018 5	Brest	1–0	Le Havre	Brest
--:-- CEST (UTC+2)				Stadium: Stade Francis-Le Blé

31 August 2018 6	Auxerre	0–2	Brest	Auxerre
--:-- CEST (UTC+2)				Stadium: Stade de l'Abbé-Deschamps

14 September 2018 7	Brest	4–1	Gazélec Ajaccio	Brest
--:-- CEST (UTC+2)				Stadium: Stade Francis-Le Blé

21 September 2018 8	Grenoble	1–2	Brest	Grenoble
--:-- CEST (UTC+2)				Stadium: Stade des Alpes

28 September 2018 9	Brest	5–1	Châteauroux	Brest
--:-- CEST (UTC+2)				Stadium: Stade Francis-Le Blé

5 October 2018 10	Valenciennes	1–3	Brest	Valenciennes
--:-- CEST (UTC+2)				Stadium: Stade du Hainaut

20 October 2018 11	Brest	3–2	Lorient	Brest
--:-- CEST (UTC+2)				Stadium: Stade Francis-Le Blé

29 October 2018 12	Clermont	2–2	Brest	Clermont-Ferrand
--:-- CET (UTC+1)				Stadium: Stade Gabriel Montpied

2 November 2018 13	Brest	1–1	Red Star	Brest
--:-- CET (UTC+1)				Stadium: Stade Francis-Le Blé

12 November 2018 14	Brest	2–1	Nancy	Brest
--:-- CET (UTC+1)				Stadium: Stade Francis-Le Blé

23 November 2018 15	Orléans	0–0	Brest	Orléans
--:-- CET (UTC+1)				Stadium: Stade de la Source

30 November 2018 16	Brest	2–0	Ajaccio	Brest
--:-- CET (UTC+1)				Stadium: Stade Francis-Le Blé

4 December 2018 17	Lens	2–1	Brest	Lens
--:-- CET (UTC+1)				Stadium: Stade Bollaert-Delelis

14 December 2018 18	Brest	3–0	Béziers	Brest
--:-- CET (UTC+1)				Stadium: Stade Francis-Le Blé

21 December 2018 19	Niort	1–1	Brest	Niort
--:-- CET (UTC+1)				Stadium: Stade René Gaillard

12 January 2019 20	Brest	1–1	Troyes	Brest
--:-- CET (UTC+1)				Stadium: Stade Francis-Le Blé

21 January 2019 21	Paris FC	0–1	Brest	Paris
--:-- CET (UTC+1)				Stadium: Stade Sebastien Charléty

26 January 2019 22	Brest	1–0	Sochaux	Brest
--:-- CET (UTC+1)				Stadium: Stade Francis-Le Blé

1 February 2019 23	Le Havre	1–1	Brest	Le Havre
--:-- CET (UTC+1)				Stadium: Stade Océane

11 February 2019 24	Brest	1–0	Auxerre	Brest
--:-- CET (UTC+1)				Stadium: Stade Francis-Le Blé

15 February 2019 25	Gazélec Ajaccio	1–1	Brest	Ajaccio
--:-- CET (UTC+1)				Stadium: Stade Ange Casanova

22 February 2019 26	Brest	3–1	Grenoble	Brest
--:-- CET (UTC+1)				Stadium: Stade Francis-Le Blé

1 March 2019 27	Châteauroux	2–2	Brest	Châteauroux
--:-- CET (UTC+1)				Stadium: Stade Gaston Petit

8 March 2019 28	Brest	2–5	Valenciennes	Brest
20:00 CET (UTC+1)				Stadium: Stade Francis-Le Blé

16 March 2019 29	Lorient	1–1	Brest	Lorient
--:-- CET (UTC+1)				Stadium: Stade du Moustoir

29 March 2019 30	Brest	0–0	Clermont	Brest
--:-- CEST (UTC+2)				Stadium: Stade Francis-Le Blé

5 April 2019 31	Red Star	0–2	Brest	Beauvais
--:-- CEST (UTC+2)				Stadium: Stade Pierre Brisson

12 April 2019 32	Nancy	2–3	Brest	Tomblaine
--:-- CEST (UTC+2)				Stadium: Stade Marcel Picot

19 April 2019 33	Brest	3–1	Orléans	Brest
--:-- CEST (UTC+2)				Stadium: Stade Francis-Le Blé

23 April 2019 34	Ajaccio	0–2	Brest	Ajaccio
--:-- CEST (UTC+2)				Stadium: Stade François Coty

27 April 2019 35	Brest	2–0	Lens	Brest
15:00 CEST (UTC+2)				Stadium: Stade Francis-Le Blé

3 May 2019 36	Béziers	1–0	Brest	Béziers
20:00 CEST (UTC+2)				Stadium: Stade de la Méditerranée

10 May 2019 37	Brest	3–0	Niort	Brest
20:45 CEST (UTC+2)				Stadium: Stade Francis-Le Blé

17 May 2019 38	Metz	1–0	Brest	Metz
20:45 CEST (UTC+2)	Diallo 17'	Report		Stadium: Stade Saint-Symphorien; Referee: Yohann Rouinsard

=== Coupe de France ===
17 November 2018 Seventh round	FC Atlantique Vilaine	1–4	Brest	Redon
20:00 CET (UTC+1)	Diaz 90+2'		Mayi 20', 80'; Belaud 53'; Charbonnier 87'	Stadium: Stade Municipal; Attendance: 1,828; Referee: Yohann Rouinsard

9 December 2018 Eighth round	Vannes OC	2–3	Brest	Vannes
13:45 CET (UTC+1)	Dufrennes 25' (pen.); Kikonda 45+1'		Court 14'; Castelletto (red card) 24'; Mayi 31'; Butin 87' (pen.)	Stadium: Stade de la Rabine; Attendance: 1,800; Referee: Benjamin Lepaysant

6 January 2019 Round of 64	Rennes	2–2 (a.e.t.) (5–4 p)	Brest	Rennes
14:15 CET (UTC+1)	Hunou 41'; Sarr 49'	Report	Charbonnier 24', 39'	Stadium: Roazhon Park; Attendance: 12,554; Referee: Antony Gautier
	Penalties
	Poha (penalty missed); Del Castillo (penalty scored); Bourigeaud (penalty missed); Sarr (penalty scored); Siebatcheu (penalty scored); Da Silva (penalty scored); Zeffane (penalty scored)		(penalty scored) Chardonnet; (penalty scored) Belkebla; (penalty scored) Ayasse; (penalty missed) Diallo; (penalty missed) Butin; (penalty scored) Court; (penalty missed) Weber

=== Coupe de la Ligue ===
14 August 2018 First round	Sochaux	1–1 (a.e.t.) (3–4 p)	Brest	Montbéliard
20:00 CEST (UTC+2)	Chardonnet 73' (o.g.)	Report	Autret 25'	Stadium: Stade Auguste Bonal; Attendance: 5,887; Referee: Romain Delpech
	Penalties
	Robinet (penalty missed); Gomes (penalty scored); Demirović (penalty scored); Nando (penalty missed); Sané (penalty scored); Pendant (penalty missed)		(penalty scored) Autret; (penalty scored) Chardonnet; (penalty scored) Butin; (penalty missed) Pi; (penalty missed) Charbonnier; (penalty scored) Diallo

28 August 2018 Second round	Le Havre	3–3 (a.e.t.) (6–5 p)	Brest	Le Havre
20:00 CEST (UTC+2)	Gory 20', 35'; Moussiti-Oko 49'	Report	Chardonnet 66'; Autret 67'; Castelletto 70'	Stadium: Stade Océane; Attendance: 3,663; Referee: Sylvain Palhies
	Penalties
	Mayembo (penalty missed); Basque (penalty scored); Ferhat (penalty scored); Özdemir (penalty scored); Moussiti-Oko (penalty scored); Lekhal (penalty scored); Assifuah (penalty scored)		(penalty scored) Autret; (penalty scored) Chardonnet; (penalty scored) Butin; (penalty missed) Belkebla; (penalty scored) Charbonnier; (penalty scored) Pi; (penalty missed) Bernard

== Statistics ==
=== Goalscorers ===
As of 17 May 2019

Rank	No.	Pos	Nat	Name	Ligue 1	Coupe de France	Coupe de la Ligue	Total
1	10	FW	(France)	Gaëtan Charbonnier	27	3	0	30
2	23	MF	(France)	Mathias Autret	9	0	2	11
3	8	MF	(France)	Yoann Court	6	1	0	7
4	9	FW	(France)	Kévin Mayi	2	3	0	5
5	11	FW	(France)	Édouard Butin	3	1	0	4
6	21	DF	(Cameroon)	Jean-Charles Castelletto	2	0	1	3
6	5	DF	(France)	Brendan Chardonnet	2	0	1	3
8	3	MF	(Italy)	Cristian Battocchio	2	0	0	2
8	20	DF	(France)	Gaëtan Belaud	1	1	0	2
8	6	MF	(France)	Jessy Pi	2	0	0	2
8	14	DF	(France)	Anthony Weber	2	0	0	2
12	24	MF	(France)	Thomas Ayasse	1	0	0	1
12	7	DF	(Algeria)	Haris Belkebla	1	0	0	1
12	22	DF	(France)	Julien Faussurier	1	0	0	1
12	19	FW	(France)	Ferris N'Goma	1	0	0	1
Own goals					2	0	0	2
Totals					64	9	4	77
