= 2020–21 AJ Auxerre season =

Auxerre
2020–21 season
- President: Francis Graille
- Manager: Jean-Marc Furlan
- Stadium: Stade de l'Abbé-Deschamps
- Ligue 2: 6th
- Coupe de France: Round of 64
- Top goalscorer: League: Mickaël Le Bihan (14); All: Mickaël Le Bihan (14)
Home colours	Away colours

The 2020–21 AJ Auxerre season was the club's 115th season in existence and the ninth consecutive season in the second division of French football. In addition to the domestic league, Auxerre participated in this season's edition of the Coupe de France. The season covered the period from 1 July 2020 to 30 June 2021.

== Players ==
=== First-team squad ===
As of 25 November 2020.

Note: Flags indicate national team as defined under FIFA eligibility rules; some limited exceptions apply. Players may hold more than one non-FIFA nationality.

No.	Pos.	Nation	Player
2	DF	HAI	Carlens Arcus
3	DF	FRA	Quentin Bernard
4	DF	BRA	Jubal Jr.
6	MF	FRA	Aly Ndom
7	FW	FRA	Gauthier Hein
8	FW	FRA	Mickaël Le Bihan
10	FW	CHN	Ji Xiaoxuan
12	MF	MLI	Birama Touré
13	FW	FRA	Kévin Fortuné
14	DF	FRA	Kenji-Van Boto
15	DF	FRA	Alec Georgen
16	GK	FRA	Donovan Léon
17	DF	FRA	Gautier Lloris
18	MF	FRA	François Bellugou

No.	Pos.	Nation	Player
19	FW	FRA	Yanis Begraoui
20	DF	FRA	Alexandre Coeff
21	FW	FRA	Rémy Dugimont
22	MF	MAR	Hamza Sakhi
23	MF	FRA	Kryss Chapelle
24	MF	FRA	Ousoumane Camara
25	FW	FRA	Lassine Sinayoko
26	DF	FRA	Samuel Souprayen (captain)
27	MF	FRA	Axel Ngando
28	FW	FRA	Ryan Ponti
29	MF	FRA	Mathias Autret
30	GK	FRA	Sonny Laiton
32	FW	FRA	Yanis Merdji

== Pre-season and friendlies ==
Win Draw Loss

18 July 2020 Friendly	Auxerre	2–0	Épinal	Auxerre, France
17:00 CEST (UTC+2)		Report		Stadium: Stade de l'Abbé Deschamps (annexe 3)

25 July 2020 Friendly	Auxerre	2–1	Red Star	Migennes, France
18:00 CEST (UTC+2)				Stadium: Stade Lucien Masson

29 July 2020 Friendly	Créteil	0–3	Auxerre	Créteil, France
18:00 CEST (UTC+2)			Le Bihan 27'; Camara 84'; Begraoui 88'	Stadium: Stade Dominique Duvauchelle

1 August 2020 Friendly	Auxerre	3–2	Le Mans	Étampes, France
17:00 CEST (UTC+2)	Sakhi 20' (pen.); Camara 22'; Begraoui 90+3'		Avounou 26'; Yoke 79'	Stadium: Centre sportif Jo-Bouillon

5 August 2020 Friendly	Bourges 18	Cancelled	Auxerre	Varennes-Vauzelles, France
17:00 CEST (UTC+2)		Report		Stadium: Stade des Senets

5 August 2020 Friendly	Orléans	1–0	Auxerre	Orléans, France
17:00 CEST (UTC+2)	Perrin 81'			Stadium: Stade de la Source

8 August 2020 Friendly	Auxerre	1–1	Orléans	Migennes, France
18:00 CEST (UTC+2)	Autret 22' (pen.)	Report	Soumaré 76'	Stadium: Stade Lucien Masson

15 August 2020 Friendly	Auxerre	Cancelled	Bordeaux	Auxerre, France
19:00 CEST (UTC+2)		Report		Stadium: Stade de l'Abbé-Deschamps

== Competitions ==
=== Overview ===
Competition	First match	Last match	Starting round	Final position	Record							
Competition	First match	Last match	Starting round	Final position	Pld	W	D	L	GF	GA	GD	Win %
Ligue 2	22 August 2020	15 May 2021	Matchday 1	6th	38	16	14	8	64	43	+21	42.11
Coupe de France	20 January 2021	10 February 2021	Eighth round	Round of 64	2	1	0	1	1	2	−1	50.00
Total					40	17	14	9	65	45	+20	42.50

Source: Soccerway

=== Ligue 2 ===
==== League table ====
Pos	Team	Pld	W	D	L	GF	GA	GD	Pts	Promotion or Relegation
4	Grenoble	38	18	11	9	51	35	+16	65	Qualification to promotion play-offs
5	Paris FC	38	17	13	8	53	37	+16	64	Qualification to promotion play-offs
6	Auxerre	38	16	14	8	64	43	+21	62	
7	Sochaux	38	12	15	11	45	37	+8	51	
8	Nancy	38	11	14	13	53	53	0	47	

Source: Ligue 2
Rules for classification: 1) Points; 2) Goal difference; 3) Number of goals scored; 4) Head-to-head goal difference; 5) Fair play points

==== Results summary ====
Overall								Home						Away					
Pld	W	D	L	GF	GA	GD	Pts	W	D	L	GF	GA	GD	W	D	L	GF	GA	GD
38	16	14	8	64	43	+21	62	10	6	3	38	18	+20	6	8	5	26	25	+1

Source: Ligue 2

==== Results by round ====
Round	1	2	3	4	5	6	7	8	9	10	11	12	13	14	15	16	17	18	19	20	21	22	23	24	25	26	27	28	29	30	31	32	33	34	35	36	37	38
Ground	H	A	H	H	A	H	A	H	A	H	A	H	A	H	A	H	A	H	A	H	A	A	H	A	H	A	H	A	H	A	H	A	H	A	H	A	H	A
Result	L	W	L	W	L	W	L	W	D	W	W	D	D	W	D	W	W	D	D	W	L	L	W	D	D	W	L	D	D	D	D	W	W	L	W	D	D	W
Position	17	12	14	11	13	10	13	10	9	6	4	6	5	4	5	4	4	5	5	4	5	5	5	5	5	5	5	6	6	6	6	6	6	6	5	6	6	6

Source: Ligue 2
A = Away; H = Home; W = Win; D = Draw; L = Loss

==== Matches ====
The league fixtures were announced on 9 July 2020.

22 August 2020 1	Auxerre	0–2	Sochaux	Auxerre
19:00 CEST (UTC+2)		Report	Diedhiou 3'; Kitala 46'	Stadium: Stade de l'Abbé-Deschamps; Referee: Mehdi Mokhtari

29 August 2020 2	Châteauroux	1–2	Auxerre	Châteauroux
19:00 CEST (UTC+2)	Mulumba 66'	Report	Autret 59'; Begraoui 90'	Stadium: Stade Gaston Petit; Referee: Pierre Gaillouste

12 September 2020 3	Auxerre	0–1	Clermont	Auxerre
19:00 CEST (UTC+2)		Report	Dossou 84'	Stadium: Stade de l'Abbé-Deschamps; Referee: Guillaume Paradis

21 September 2020 4	Auxerre	2–1	Troyes	Auxerre
20:45 CEST (UTC+2)	Ngando 37'; Le Bihan 58'	Report	Touzghar 90+1'	Stadium: Stade de l'Abbé-Deschamps; Referee: Olivier Thual

26 September 2020 5	Toulouse	3–1	Auxerre	Toulouse
15:00 CEST (UTC+2)	Van den Boomen 69' (pen.); Moreira 86'; Healey 90+3'	Report	Le Bihan 58'	Stadium: Stadium de Toulouse; Referee: Mathieu Vernice

3 October 2020 6	Auxerre	5–1	Ajaccio	Auxerre
19:00 CEST (UTC+2)	Le Bihan 7', 37'; Dugimont 23' (pen.), 41'; Fortuné 84' (pen.)	Report	Elisor 30'	Stadium: Stade de l'Abbé-Deschamps; Attendance: 0 Referee: Bartolomeu Varela

19 October 2020 7	Guingamp	2–0	Auxerre	Guingamp
20:45 CEST (UTC+2)	Pelé 59'; Livolant 81'	Report		Stadium: Stade de Roudourou; Referee: Nicolas Rainville

24 October 2020 8	Auxerre	4–0	Chambly	Auxerre
19:00 CEST (UTC+2)	Le Bihan 17', 29', 49'; Duigmont 20'	Report		Stadium: Stade de l'Abbé-Deschamps; Attendance: 0 Referee: Pierre Gaillouste

31 October 2020 9	Rodez	2–2	Auxerre	Rodez
19:00 CET (UTC+1)	Bonnett 22'; Douline 38'	Report	Autret 35'; Le Bihan 73'	Stadium: Stade Paul-Lignon; Attendance: 0 Referee: Mehdi Mokhtari

7 November 2020 10	Auxerre	2–1	Amiens	Auxerre
19:00 CET (UTC+1)	Sakhi 44'; Duigmont 57'	Report	Timité 77'	Stadium: Stade de l'Abbé-Deschamps; Attendance: 0 Referee: Abdelatif Kherradji

21 November 2020 11	Paris FC	0–3	Auxerre	Paris
19:00 CET (UTC+1)		Report	Le Bihan 5', 38'; Dugimont 9'	Stadium: Stade Sébastien Charléty; Attendance: 0 Referee: Mathieu Vernice

28 November 2020 12	Auxerre	1–1	Valenciennes	Auxerre
19:00 CET (UTC+1)	Autret 45+1'	Report	Chevalier 12'	Stadium: Stade de l'Abbé-Deschamps; Attendance: 0 Referee: Rémi Landry

1 December 2020 13	Le Havre	1–1	Auxerre	Le Havre
19:00 CET (UTC+1)	Lloris 49' (o.g.)	Report	Autret 39'	Stadium: Stade Océane; Referee: Bartolomeu Varela

5 December 2020 14	Auxerre	6–0	Niort	Auxerre
19:00 CET (UTC+1)	Le Bihan 4', 50', 81'; Autret 34'; Hein 65'; Sakhi 76'	Report		Stadium: Stade de l'Abbé-Deschamps; Attendance: 0 Referee: Romain Lissorgue

12 December 2020 15	Nancy	2–2	Auxerre	Tomblaine
19:00 CET (UTC+1)	Seka 31'; Bassi 48' (pen.)	Report	Autret 32'; Sakhi 35'	Stadium: Stade Marcel Picot; Attendance: 0 Referee: Alain Durieux

18 December 2020 16	Auxerre	2–1	Pau	Auxerre
20:00 CET (UTC+1)	Jubal 29'; Dugimont 49'	Report	Batisse 12'	Stadium: Stade de l'Abbé-Deschamps; Attendance: 0 Referee: Guillaume Paradis

22 December 2020 17	Dunkerque	0–1	Auxerre	Dunkirk
19:00 CET (UTC+1)		Report	Dugimont 58'	Stadium: Stade Marcel-Tribut; Attendance: 0 Referee: Arnaud Baert

5 January 2021 18	Auxerre	1–1	Caen	Auxerre
20:00 CET (UTC+1)	Dugimont 53'	Report	Jeannot 81'	Stadium: Stade de l'Abbé-Deschamps; Attendance: 0 Referee: Rémi Landry

9 January 2021 19	Grenoble	2–2	Auxerre	Grenoble
15:00 CET (UTC+1)	Anani 79'; Nestor 90+3'	Report	Le Bihan 23'; Sakhi 50'; Ndom (red card) 85'	Stadium: Stade des Alpes; Attendance: 0 Referee: Bartolomeu Varela

16 January 2021 20	Auxerre	4–1	Châteauroux	Auxerre
19:00 CET (UTC+1)	Fortuné 9'; Sakhi 67'; Hein 79'; Begraoui 90'	Report	Merdji 36'	Stadium: Stade de l'Abbé-Deschamps; Attendance: 0 Referee: Eric Wattellier

23 January 2021 21	Clermont	1–0	Auxerre	Clermont-Ferrand
15:00 CET (UTC+1)	Dossou 13'	Report		Stadium: Stade Gabriel Montpied; Attendance: 0 Referee: Jeremy Stinat

30 January 2021 22	Troyes	3–1	Auxerre	Troyes
15:00 CET (UTC+1)	Dingomé 28'; Raveloson 75'; Gory 90'	Report	Fortuné 79'	Stadium: Stade de l'Aube; Attendance: 0 Referee: Benoît Bastien

2 February 2021 23	Auxerre	3–1	Toulouse	Auxerre
20:00 CET (UTC+1)	Dugimont 4', 77'; Ngando 42'	Report	Healey 90+3' (pen.)	Stadium: Stade de l'Abbé-Deschamps; Attendance: 0 Referee: Guillaume Paradis

5 February 2021 24	Ajaccio	0–0	Auxerre	Ajaccio
20:00 CET (UTC+1)		Report		Stadium: Stade François Coty; Attendance: 0 Referee: Gaël Angoula

13 February 2021 25	Auxerre	1–1	Guingamp	Auxerre
15:00 CET (UTC+1)	Bernard 37'	Report	Y. Gomis 18'	Stadium: Stade de l'Abbé-Deschamps; Attendance: 0 Referee: Pierre Gaillouste

20 February 2021 26	Chambly	0–1	Auxerre	Chambly
19:00 CET (UTC+1)		Report	Dugimont 70' (pen.)	Stadium: Stade Pierre Brisson; Attendance: 0 Referee: Mikaël Lesage

27 February 2021 27	Auxerre	0–1	Rodez	Auxerre
18:00 CET (UTC+1)		Report	Leborgne 80'	Stadium: Stade de l'Abbé-Deschamps; Attendance: 0 Referee: Benjamin Lepaysant

2 March 2021 28	Amiens	1–1	Auxerre	Amiens
20:00 CET (UTC+1)	Lomotey 29'; Opoku (yellow card) 60'	Report	Le Bihan 12'	Stadium: Stade de la Licorne; Attendance: 0 Referee: Romain Lissorgue

13 March 2021 29	Auxerre	0–0	Paris FC	Auxerre
15:00 CET (UTC+1)	Autret (yellow card) 75'	Report	Nomenjanahary (yellow card) 90+3'	Stadium: Stade de l'Abbé-Deschamps; Referee: Antony Gautier

20 March 2021 30	Valenciennes	2–2	Auxerre	Valenciennes
20:00 CET (UTC+1)	Cuffaut 45+1' (pen.); Masson (yellow card) 62'; Kankava (yellow card) 83'; Guillaume 86'; Doukouré (yellow card) 90+3'	Report	Lloris 22'; Le Bihan 32'; Touré (yellow card) 81'	Stadium: Stade du Hainaut; Referee: Pierre Gaillouste

5 April 2021 31	Auxerre	1–1	Le Havre	Auxerre
20:45 CEST (UTC+1)	Jubal Jr. (yellow card) 37'; Duigmont 39'; Coeff (yellow card) 52'; Autret (yellow card) 56'	Report	Bonnet 53' (pen.)	Stadium: Stade de l'Abbé-Deschamps; Referee: Mathieu Vernice

10 April 2021 32	Niort	0–4	Auxerre	Niort
20:00 CET (UTC+1)	Louiserre (penalty missed) 50'	Report	Lloris 35', 59'; Hein 69'; Coeff 76'	Stadium: Stade René Gaillard; Referee: Nicolas Rainville

17 April 2021 33	Auxerre	3–2	Nancy	Auxerre
20:00 CEST (UTC+2)	Lloris 19'; Jubal Jr. 41', (yellow card) 52'; Arcus (yellow card) 65'; Coeff 84'	Report	Scheidler 3'; Akichi (yellow card) 48'; El Kaoutari (yellow card) 58'; Seka 71'	Stadium: Stade de l'Abbé-Deschamps; Referee: Florent Batta

20 April 2021 34	Pau	3–0	Auxerre	Pau
20:00 CEST (UTC+2)	Lobry 37'; George 44', 78'; Daubin (yellow card) 48'	Report	Lloris (yellow card) 67'; Hein (yellow card) 86'	Stadium: Stade du Hameau; Referee: Romain Delpech

24 April 2021 35	Auxerre	2–1	Dunkerque	Auxerre
20:00 CEST (UTC+2)	Touré (yellow card) 45+1' (yellow-red card) 84'; Le Bihan 33', 55'	Report	Tchokounté 2'; A. Gomis (yellow card) 53'; Boudaud (yellow card) 62'; Ba (yellow card) 89'	Stadium: Stade de l'Abbé-Deschamps; Referee: Guillaume Paradis

1 May 2021 36	Caen	0–0	Auxerre	Caen
20:00 CEST (UTC+2)	Fouda (yellow card) 27'; Deminguet (yellow card) 54'; Traoré (yellow card) 86'	Report	Dugimont (yellow card) 57'; Camara (yellow card) 75'; Bellugou (yellow card) 85'	Stadium: Stade Michel d'Ornano; Referee: Bartolomeu Varela

8 May 2021 37	Auxerre	1–1	Grenoble	Auxerre
20:00 CEST (UTC+2)	Le Bihan 39'; Hein (penalty missed) 90+8'	Report	Jubal Jr. 3' (o.g.); Belmonte (yellow card) 75'; Abdallah (yellow card) 90+6'	Stadium: Stade de l'Abbé-Deschamps; Referee: Olivier Thual

15 May 2021 38	Sochaux	2–3	Auxerre	Montbéliard
20:00 CEST (UTC+2)	Lasme 43', 53'	Report	Hein 48'; Dugimont 61', 64'	Stadium: Stade Auguste Bonal; Referee: Bartolomeu Varela

=== Coupe de France ===
19 January 2021 Eighth round	Auxerre	1–0	Troyes	Auxerre
21:00 CET (UTC+1)	Bellugou 58'	Report		Stadium: Stade de l'Abbé-Deschamps; Attendance: 0 Referee: Romain Delpech

10 February 2021 Round of 64	Auxerre	0–2	Marseille	Auxerre
14:45 CET (UTC+1)		Report	Benedetto 54'; Dieng 90+2'	Stadium: Stade de l'Abbé-Deschamps; Attendance: 0 Referee: Frank Schneider

== Statistics ==
=== Goalscorers ===
As of

Rank	No.	Pos	Nat	Name	Ligue 2	Coupe de France	Total
		FW		[[]]			
Totals							
