= Gaëtan Charbonnier =

French footballer (born 1988)

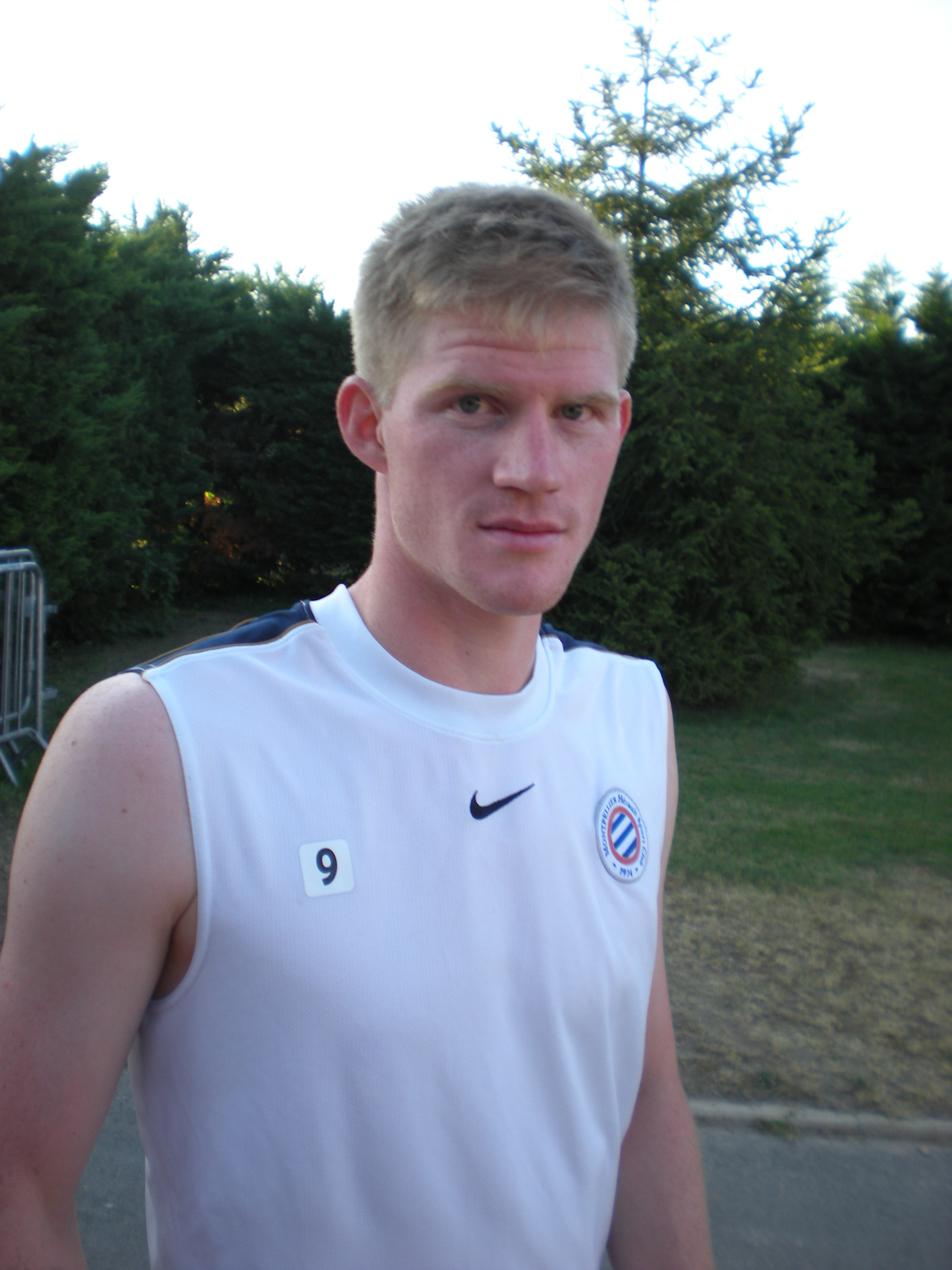
- Charbonnier with Montpellier

Personal information
- Date of birth: 27 December 1988 (age 37)
- Place of birth: Saint-Mandé, France
- Height: 1.87 m (6 ft 2 in)
- Position: Forward

Team information
- Current team: Pouzauges Bocage FC

Senior career*
Years	Team	Apps	(Gls)
2007–2008	Châtellerault		
2008–2009	Paris Saint-Germain B		
2009–2012	Angers	90	(23)
2012–2013	Montpellier	26	(4)
2012–2013	Montpellier B	6	(2)
2013–2017	Reims	103	(18)
2013–2015	Reims B	9	(6)
2017–2021	Brest	125	(46)
2021–2022	Auxerre	38	(18)
2022–2024	Saint-Étienne	25	(4)
2024	Bastia	16	(1)
2024–	Pouzauges Bocage FC		
- * Club domestic league appearances and goals as of 22:24, 9 August 2024 (UTC)

Gaëtan Charbonnier (born 27 December 1988) is a French footballer who plays as a forward for Régional 1 club Pouzauges Bocage FC.

== Club career ==
Born in Saint-Mandé, Charbonnier started his career at Championnat de France Amateur side Châtellerault in the 2007–08 season, his debut season impressing enough to be taken on by Paris Saint-Germain. While playing the 2008–09 season with PSG's reserve team, he was unable to make the first team.

Charbonnier signed a four-year contract in June 2009 for Ligue 2 side Angers where he played three seasons in Ligue 2. Each season saw him increase his goal tally – three in 2009–10, eight in 2010–11, and 12 in 2011–12 –, reaching a total of 23 goals in 90 matches.

His goal return landed him a move on 20 June 2012 to reigning Ligue 1 champions Montpellier where he signed a four-year contract. The transfer fee paid to Angers was reported as €1.5 million. The transfer was announced the same day along with Toulouse defender Daniel Congré. In August 2013, Charbonnier joined fellow Ligue 1 side Reims after only one season with Montpellier.

On 16 December 2022, Charbonnier returned to Ligue 2 to sign for Saint-Étienne on a contract until the end of the 2022–23 season. On 15 January 2024, he signed for Bastia on a contract until the end of the 2024–25 season, with an option for a further season.

At the end of the 2023–24 season, Charbonnier put an end to his professional career, signing for amateur club Pouzauges Bocage FC in the sixth-tier Régional 1, where his brother was the head coach.

== Career statistics ==
As of 29 June 2024

Appearances and goals by club, season, and competition
Club	Season	League			National cup		League cup		Europe		Other		Total	
Club	Season	Division	Apps	Goals	Apps	Goals	Apps	Goals	Apps	Goals	Apps	Goals	Apps	Goals
Châtellerault	2007–08	CFA	27	11	2	1	—		—		—		29	12
Paris Saint-Germain B	2008–09	CFA	29	13	—		—		—		—		29	13
Angers	2009–10	Ligue 2	26	3	1	0	1	0	—		—		28	3
Angers	2010–11	Ligue 2	34	8	6	1	1	0	—		—		41	9
Angers	2011–12	Ligue 2	30	12	3	3	1	1	—		—		34	16
Angers	Total		90	23	10	4	3	1	—		—		103	28
Montpellier	2012–13	Ligue 1	26	4	2	1	2	0	3 (Note: Appearance(s) in UEFA Champions League)	1	1 (Note: Appearance in Trophée des Champions)	0	34	6
Montpellier B	2012–13	CFA 2	6	2	—		—		—		—		6	2
Reims	2013–14	Ligue 1	30	5	1	0	2	0	—		—		33	5
Reims	2014–15	Ligue 1	33	6	2	1	0	0	—		—		35	7
Reims	2015–16	Ligue 1	22	4	0	0	1	1	—		—		23	5
Reims	2016–17	Ligue 2	18	3	1	1	0	0	—		—		19	4
Reims	Total		103	18	4	2	3	1	—		—		110	21
Reims B	2013–14	CFA 2	1	0	—		—		—		—		1	0
Reims B	2015–16	CFA 2	6	5	—		—		—		—		6	5
Reims B	2016–17	CFA	2	1	—		—		—		—		2	1
Reims B	Total		9	6	—		—		—		—		9	6
Brest	2017–18	Ligue 2	26	9	2	2	0	0	—		—		28	11
Brest	2018–19	Ligue 2	37	27	3	3	2	0	—		—		42	30
Brest	2019–20	Ligue 1	26	4	1	1	2	1	—		—		29	6
Brest	2020–21	Ligue 1	36	6	2	0	—		—		—		38	6
Brest	Total		125	46	8	6	4	1	—		—		137	53
Auxerre	2021–22	Ligue 2	32	17	2	0	—		—		—		34	17
Auxerre	2022–23	Ligue 1	6	1	0	0	0	0	—		—		6	1
Auxerre	Total		38	18	2	0	0	0	—		—		40	18
Saint-Étienne	2022–23	Ligue 2	7	3	0	0	—		—		—		7	3
Saint-Étienne	2023–24	Ligue 2	18	1	2	2	—		—		—		20	3
Saint-Étienne	Total		25	4	2	2	—		—		—		27	6
Bastia	2023–24	Ligue 2	16	1	0	0	—		—		—		16	1
Career total			494	147	30	16	12	3	3	1	1	0	540	167

== Honours ==
Individual

- UNFP Ligue 2 Team of the Year: 2021–22
