= Birama Touré =

Malian footballer (born 1992)

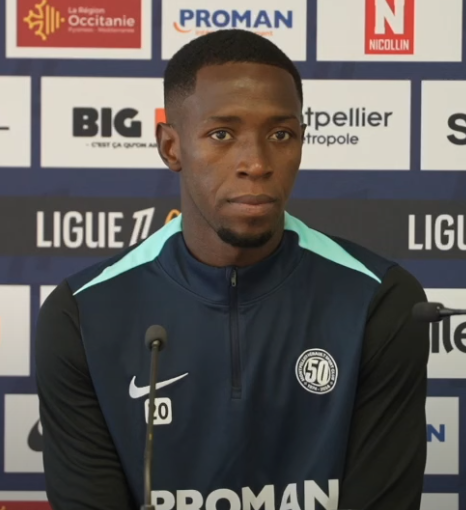
- Touré in 2024

Personal information
- Date of birth: 6 June 1992 (age 34)
- Place of birth: Kayes, Mali
- Height: 1.83 m (6 ft 0 in)
- Position: Defensive midfielder

Team information
- Current team: Manisa
- Number: 60

Youth career
- –2010: Beauvais

Senior career*
Years	Team	Apps	(Gls)
2010–2012	Beauvais	18	(0)
2012–2016	Nantes	81	(1)
2012–2016	Nantes B	7	(0)
2014–2015	→ Brest (loan)	22	(1)
2016–2017	Standard Liège	3	(1)
2017	→ Auxerre (loan)	17	(1)
2017–2023	Auxerre	194	(3)
2019	Auxerre B	3	(0)
2023–2024	Al-Riyadh	33	(4)
2024–2025	Montpellier	8	(0)
2025	→ Manisa (loan)	13	(0)
2025–	Manisa	23	(2)

International career
2014–2016	Mali	10	(0)
- * Club domestic league appearances and goals as of 6 May 2026

Birama Touré (born 6 June 1992) is a Malian professional footballer who plays as a defensive midfielder for TFF 1. Lig club Manisa.

== Club career ==
Touré's career started in 2010 with his youth club Beauvais, he participated in 18 matches during 2010–11 and 2011–12 in Championnat National. In 2012, Touré joined Ligue 2 side Nantes. He made his debut for Nantes on 4 August 2012 against Nîmes, whilst scoring his first goal for them on 22 October versus Dijon. Touré played 58 times for Nantes in his first three seasons, including 26 apps in his debut season as the club won promotion to Ligue 1; he has also played 7 times for the club's reserve team. In November 2014, Touré signed for Ligue 2 team Brest on loan for the 2014–15 Ligue 2 season. He scored once in twenty-two league games before returning to Nantes.

On 1 July 2016, Touré completed a transfer to Belgian First Division A club Standard Liège and subsequently made his debut on 19 August in a league draw with Charleroi. In his second league appearance, versus Club Brugge, he scored his first Standard Liège goal. On 16 January 2017, Touré left to join Ligue 2 side Auxerre on loan.

On 22 July 2023, Touré joined Saudi Professional League club Al-Riyadh on a free transfer.

On 11 September 2024, Touré signed for Ligue 1 club Montpellier. On 12 August 2025, he signed for Turkish club Manisa on a permanent transfer.

== International career ==
Touré has represented the Mali national team at international level.

== Career statistics ==
=== Club ===
As of 1 July 2025.

Appearances and goals by club, season and competition
Club	Season	League			National cup		League cup		Other		Total	
Club	Season	Division	Apps	Goals	Apps	Goals	Apps	Goals	Apps	Goals	Apps	Goals
Beauvais	2010–11	Championnat National	2	0	0	0	—		—		2	0
Beauvais	2011–12	Championnat National	16	0	0	0	—		—		16	0
Beauvais	Total		18	0	0	0	—		—		18	0
Nantes	2012–13	Ligue 2	26	1	3	0	0	0	—		29	1
Nantes	2013–14	Ligue 1	31	0	0	0	3 (Note: Appearance(s) in the Coupe de la Ligue)	0	—		34	0
Nantes	2014–15	Ligue 1	1	0	0	0	1	0	—		2	0
Nantes	2015–16	Ligue 1	23	0	3	0	1	0	—		27	0
Nantes	Total		81	1	6	0	5	0	—		92	1
Nantes B	2012–13	Championnat de France Amateur 2	2	0	—		—		—		2	0
Nantes B	2013–14	Championnat de France Amateur	1	0	—		—		—		1	0
Nantes B	2014–15	Championnat de France Amateur	3	0	—		—		—		3	0
Nantes B	2015–16	Championnat de France Amateur	1	0	—		—		—		1	0
Nantes B	Total		7	0	—		—		—		7	0
Brest (loan)	2014–15	Ligue 2	22	1	4	0	0	0	—		26	1
Standard Liège	2016–17	Belgian First Division A	3	1	0	0	—		0	0	3	1
Auxerre (loan)	2016–17	Ligue 2	17	1	2	1	0	0	—		19	2
Auxerre	2017–18	Ligue 2	37	0	3	0	1	0	—		41	0
Auxerre	2018–19	Ligue 2	30	0	0	0	2	0	—		32	0
Auxerre	2019–20	Ligue 2	25	0	2	0	1	0	—		28	0
Auxerre	2020–21	Ligue 2	28	0	1	0	—		—		29	0
Auxerre	2021–22	Ligue 2	36	1	3	0	—		3 (Note: One appearance in the Ligue 2 promotion play-offs, two appearances in the Ligue 1 relegation/promotion play-offs)	0	42	1
Auxerre	2022–23	Ligue 1	38	2	1	0	—		—		39	2
Auxerre	Total		194	3	10	0	4	0	3	0	211	3
Auxerre B	2018–19	Championnat National 3	3	0	—		—		—		3	0
Al-Riyadh	2023–24	Saudi Pro League	33	4	1	0	—		—		34	4
Montpellier	2024–25	Ligue 1	8	0	0	0	—		—		8	0
Manisa (loan)	2024–25	TFF 1. Lig	13	0	0		—		—		13	0
Career total			399	11	23	1	9	0	3	0	434	12

== Honours ==
Nantes B

- Championnat de France Amateur 2: 2012–13
