= Kays Ruiz-Atil =

Footballer (born 2002)

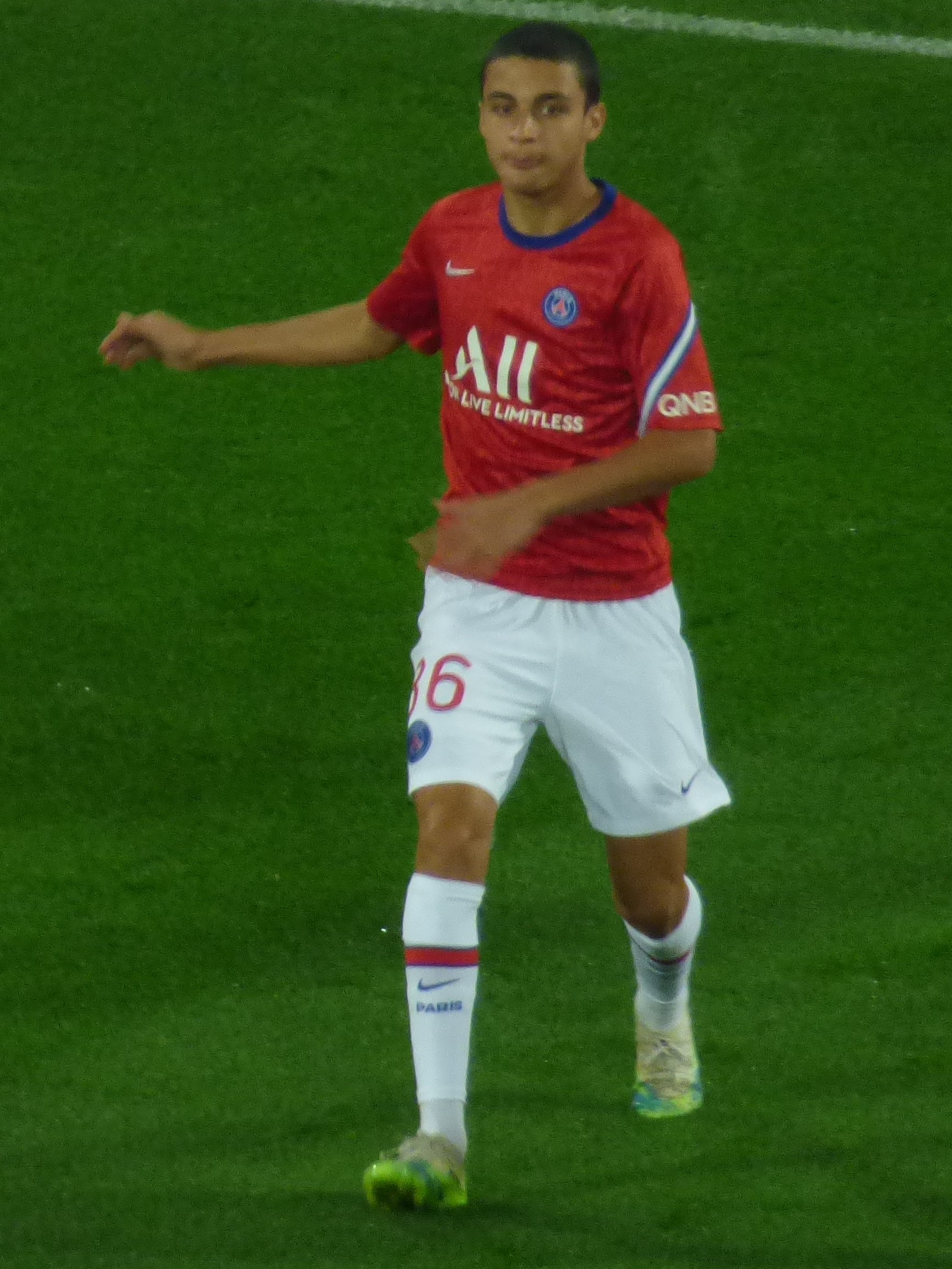
- Ruiz-Atil with Paris Saint-Germain in 2020

Personal information
- Date of birth: 26 August 2002 (age 24)
- Place of birth: Lyon, France
- Height: 1.68 m (5 ft 6 in)
- Position: Midfielder

Team information
- Current team: RFC Liège
- Number: 8

Youth career
- 2006–2008: FC Gerland
- 2009: Lyon
- 2009–2015: Barcelona
- 2015–2020: Paris Saint-Germain

Senior career*
Years	Team	Apps	(Gls)
2020–2021	Paris Saint-Germain	7	(0)
2021–2022	Barcelona B	11	(0)
2022–2023	Auxerre	1	(0)
2022–2023	Auxerre B	1	(0)
2024–2025	Francs Borains	29	(4)
2026–	RFC Liège	15	(2)

International career
2021–2022	France U20	4	(0)
- * Club domestic league appearances and goals as of 19:55, 3 September 2026 (UTC)

Kays Ruiz-Atil (born 26 August 2002) is a professional footballer who plays as a midfielder for Challenger Pro League club RFC Liège. Born in France, he has represented both France and Morocco at youth international level.

== Early life ==
Kays Ruiz-Atil was born in Lyon and grew up in the Gerland part of Lyon's 7th arrondissement in a French and Moroccan family. His father Radouan Atil is Moroccan, and his mother Antonia Ruiz is French of Spanish descent.

== Club career ==
=== Early career ===
Having first played for FC Gerland and Lyon, Ruiz-Atil gained media attention in 2009 when he was recruited by Barcelona at only 7 years old.

=== Paris Saint-Germain ===
After the Barcelona transfer ban due to illegal signings of underage players, Ruiz-Atil moved to Paris Saint-Germain (PSG) in 2015. But this move later proved to be controversial in the 2018 Football Leaks; there, the Parisian club was accused of having made an illegal transfer, with a suspicious employment of his father Radouan. This did not however lead to any legal procedure, PSG having seemingly received the approval of international institutions. Before these controversies, Ruiz-Atil had signed a first "aspirant" contract with PSG in June 2017, locking his presence in the Paris Saint-Germain Academy. On 31 August 2018, he signed his first professional contract with the club. In the following seasons, Ruiz-Atil played in the UEFA Youth League, under the supervision of Thiago Motta for the 2018–19 season, to whom he was quite close. At this time, his public image did not seem to have suffered greatly from the Football Leaks, Ruiz-Atil having for instance signed a big contract with Adidas.

On 10 September 2020, Ruiz-Atil made his debut for Paris Saint-Germain in a 1–0 Ligue 1 loss to Lens. He was part of the starting lineup for the match, but was substituted for Colin Dagba after 68 minutes of play. For much of the 2020–21 season, Ruiz-Atil was training with and playing matches for PSG's first team; he made a total of seven appearances under the management of Thomas Tuchel in the first half of the season. However, in February 2021, one month after the arrival of Mauricio Pochettino as head coach, he was sent back to train with the under-19 squad, with his departure at the end of his contract in June 2021 becoming increasingly likely according to various reports. On 25 May, he officially announced on social media his departure from PSG at the end of his contract.

=== Barcelona B ===
On 12 July 2021, Ruiz-Atil returned to Barcelona, signing a three-year contract with an option for a further two years. He was assigned to the reserve team in the Primera División RFEF. His buyout clause was set at 50 million euros, and upon a promotion to the first team, the clause would have risen to 100 million. He made his debut on 6 November in a 4–0 home win against Sevilla Atlético, coming on as an 81st-minute substitute for Antonio Aranda. On 11 May 2022, Barcelona announced that they had terminated Ruiz-Atil's contract.

=== Auxerre ===
On 28 June 2022, Ruiz-Atil signed with newly promoted Ligue 1 side Auxerre on a three-year contract. He chose the number 18 jersey at the club. On 31 August, he made his debut for Auxerre in a 2–1 away defeat to Lyon, his hometown club.

On 12 July 2023, Auxerre announced that they had terminated Ruiz-Atil's contract.

=== Francs Borains ===
Having not featured in a match since November 2022, Ruiz-Atil joined Challenger Pro League side Francs Borains on a free transfer in May 2024.

=== RFC Liège ===
On 20 January 2026, Ruiz-Atil joined RFC Liège in the Challenger Pro League on one-and-a-half-year contract with an option for an additional year.

== International career ==
Ruiz-Atil is eligible to play for France, Morocco, and Spain.

Ruiz-Atil was selected with the Morocco U15 national team in November 2016. He was also selected with the France U16 national team in August 2017, and the France U19 national team in October 2020.

On 3 September 2021, Ruiz-Atil made his debut for the France U20 national team in a 0–0 friendly draw against Norway.

In November 2022, he chose to represent Morocco and was selected for the U23 Moroccan team.

== Career statistics ==
As of match played 3 November 2024

Appearances and goals by club, season and competition
Club	Season	League			National cup		Other		Total	
Club	Season	Division	Apps	Goals	Apps	Goals	Apps	Goals	Apps	Goals
Paris Saint-Germain	2020–21	Ligue 1	7	0	0	0	0	0	7	0
Barcelona B	2021–22	1ª RFEF	11	0	—		—		11	0
Auxerre	2022–23	Ligue 1	1	0	0	0	—		1	0
Auxerre B	2022–23	National 2	1	0	—		—		1	0
Francs Borains	2024–25	Challenger Pro League	8	1	1	0	—		9	1
Career total			28	1	1	0	0	0	29	1
