= Gautier Lloris =

French footballer (born 1995)

Personal information
- Date of birth: 18 July 1995 (age 31)
- Place of birth: Nice, France
- Height: 1.91 m (6 ft 3 in)
- Position: Centre-back

Team information
- Current team: Brest
- Number: 4

Youth career
- 2001–2007: Ent St. Sylvestre Nice Nord
- 2007–2014: Nice

Senior career*
Years	Team	Apps	(Gls)
2012–2020	Nice II	75	(2)
2016–2020	Nice	6	(0)
2018	→ Gazélec Ajaccio (loan)	13	(0)
2020–2022	Auxerre	29	(0)
2022–2026	Le Havre	118	(8)
2026–	Brest	0	(0)

International career
2013	France U19	3	(0)
- * Club domestic league appearances and goals as of 17 May 2026

Gautier Lloris (born 18 July 1995) is a French professional footballer who plays as a centre-back for Ligue 1 club Brest.

== Club career ==
On 4 January 2016, Lloris made his full debut in Nice's 2–2 draw against Rennes in the Coupe de France.

On 12 July 2022, Lloris signed a two-year contract with Le Havre.

On 17 October 2023, Lloris signed a three-year extension with Le Havre.

== Personal life ==
He is the younger brother of Hugo Lloris, a former France international and France's most-capped player.

== Career statistics ==
As of 17 May 2026

Appearances and goals by club, season and competition
Club	Season	League			National cup		League cup		Europe		Other		Total	
Club	Season	Division	Apps	Goals	Apps	Goals	Apps	Goals	Apps	Goals	Apps	Goals	Apps	Goals
Nice II	2014–15	CFA 2	4	0	—		—		—		—		4	0
Nice	2015–16	Ligue 1	2	0	1	0	0	0	—		—		3	0
Nice	2016–17	Ligue 1	0	0	0	0	0	0	0	0	—		0	0
Nice	2017–18	Ligue 1	0	0	0	0	0	0	0	0	—		0	0
Nice	2018–19	Ligue 1	0	0	0	0	0	0	—		—		0	0
Nice	2019–20	Ligue 1	3	0	0	0	0	0	—		—		3	0
Nice	Total		5	0	1	0	0	0	0	0	0	0	6	0
Gazélec Ajaccio (loan)	2017–18	Ligue 2	13	0	0	0	0	0	—		—		13	0
Auxerre	2020–21	Ligue 2	26	4	0	0	—		—		—		26	4
Auxerre	2021–22	Ligue 2	3	0	2	0	—		—		0	0	5	0
Auxerre	Total		29	4	2	0	—		—		0	0	31	4
Auxerre B	2021–22	CFA 2	1	0	—		—		—		—		1	0
Le Havre	2022–23	Ligue 2	27	3	0	0	—		—		—		27	3
Le Havre	2023–24	Ligue 1	31	2	2	0	—		—		—		33	2
Le Havre	2024–25	Ligue 1	31	2	0	0	—		—		—		31	2
Le Havre	2025–26	Ligue 1	29	1	1	0	—		—		—		30	1
Le Havre	Total		118	8	3	0	—		—		—		121	8
Career total			170	12	6	0	0	0	0	0	0	0	176	12
