= Corentin Jacob =

French footballer (born 1997)

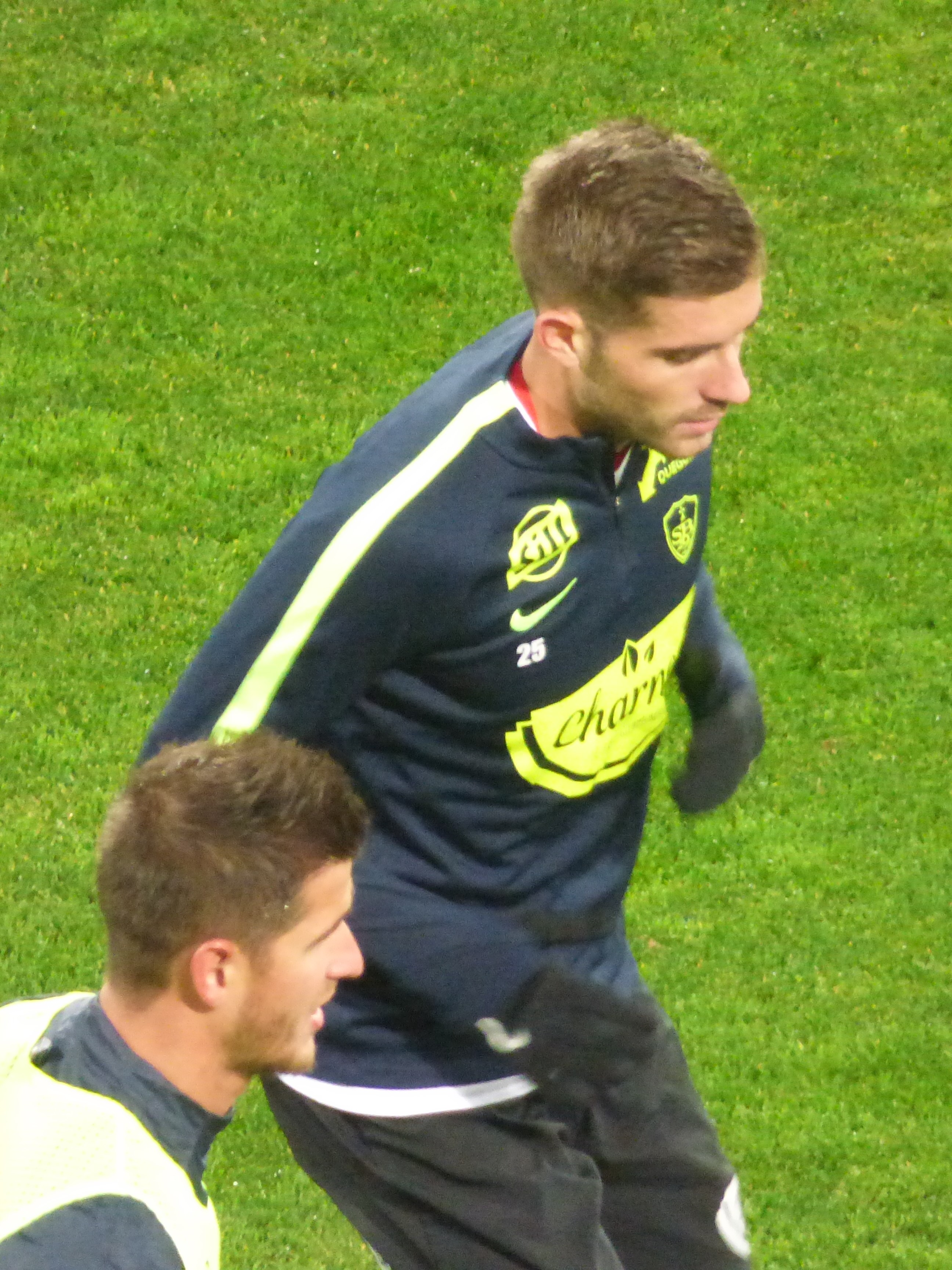
- Jacob in 2018

Personal information
- Date of birth: 7 January 1997 (age 29)
- Place of birth: Brest, France
- Height: 1.88 m (6 ft 2 in)
- Position: Midfielder

Team information
- Current team: Saint-Pierre Milizac

Youth career
- 2003–2007: Saint-Pierre de Milizac
- 2008–2014: Brest

Senior career*
| Years | Team | Apps | (Gls) |
| 2014–2019 | Brest B | 62 | (7) |
| 2016–2019 | Brest | 7 | (0) |
| 2018 | → Bastia-Borgo (loan) | 10 | (0) |
| 2019 | → Tours (loan) | 15 | (1) |
| 2019–2022 | Rodez B | 8 | (0) |
| 2019–2022 | Rodez | 7 | (0) |
| 2020–2021 | → Sporting Lyon (loan) | 28 | (1) |
| 2021–2022 | → Concarneau (loan) | 29 | (0) |
| 2022– | Saint-Pierre Milizac | 55 | (6) |

International career
| 2013 | France U16 | 1 | (0) |
| 2013–2014 | France U17 | 8 | (1) |
| 2014–2015 | France U19 | 3 | (0) |
- * Club domestic league appearances and goals as of 7 December 2024

Corentin Jacob (born 7 January 1997) is a French professional footballer who plays for Championnat National 3 club Saint-Pierre Milizac. Jacob is a former French youth international.

== Career ==
Jacob joined the training centre of Stade Brestois 29 aged 12. He signed his first professional contract with the club in May 2015, for three years, effective from 1 July 2015. He made his professional debut for the club on 6 November 2015, coming on as a late substitute in the 3–0 Ligue 2 win against Tours FC.

In January 2018, he joined FC Bastia-Borgo on loan in Championnat National 2 until the end of the season, in order to get extra playing time.

In January 2019, he was loaned to Tours in Championnat National until the end of the season. Whilst at Tours he scored his first senior goal, in the 1–1 draw with US Quevilly-Rouen on 29 March 2019.

In June 2019, despite having one year remaining on his Brest contract, Jacob signed for newly-promoted Ligue 2 side Rodez AF, on an initial one-year contract, with option to extend if relegation was avoided. In July 2020 he extended his contract with Rodez until 2022, and joined Sporting Club Lyon on loan in the Championnat National for the 2020–21 season. On 16 July 2021, he joined Concarneau on a season-long loan.
