= Alain Ipiélé =

Footballer (born 1997)

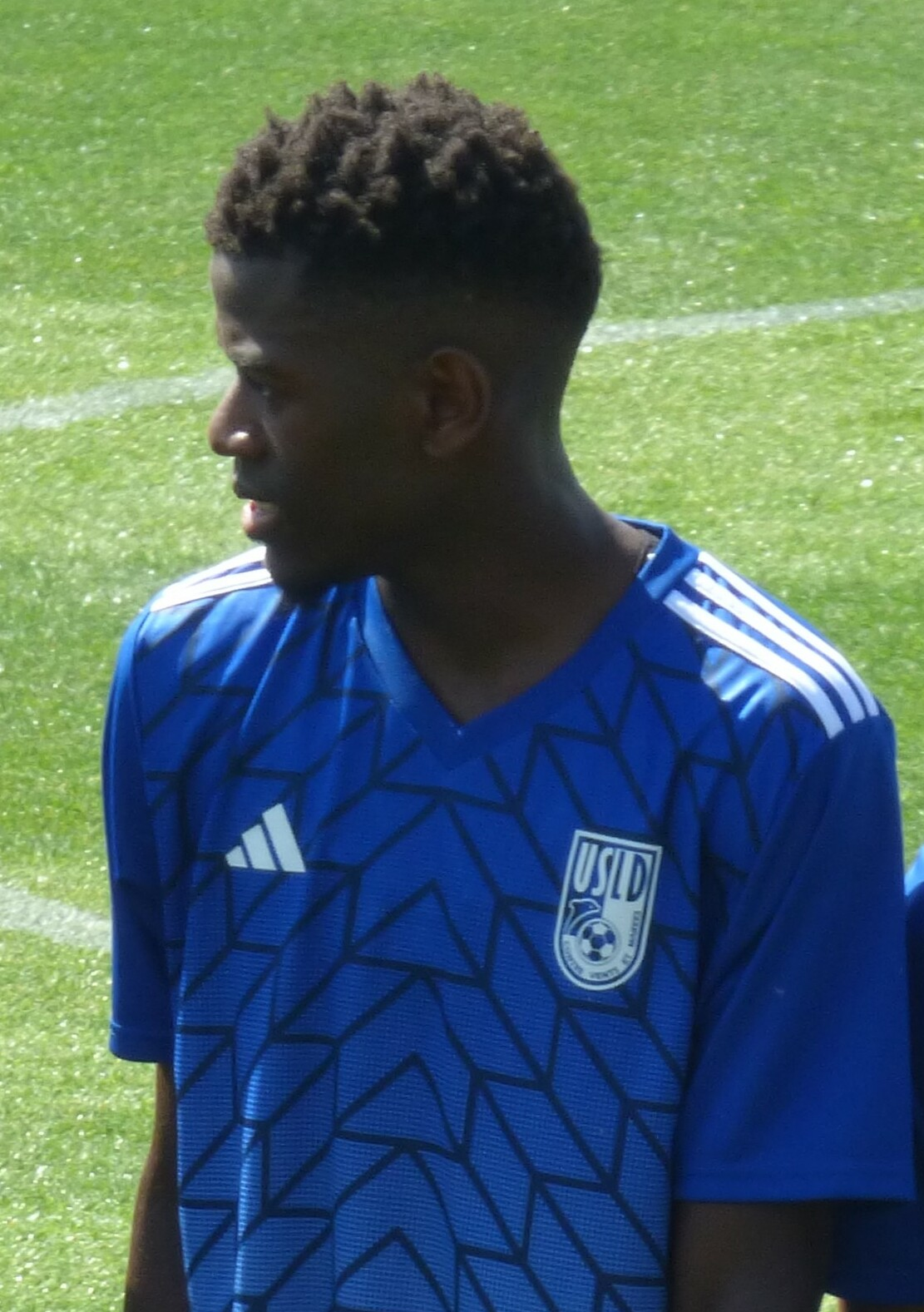
- Ipiélé in 2023

Personal information
- Full name: Alain Mouya Ipiélé
- Date of birth: 20 August 1997 (age 29)
- Place of birth: Paris, France
- Height: 1.75 m (5 ft 9 in)
- Position: Left winger

Youth career
- 2003–2017: Ivry

Senior career*
Years	Team	Apps	(Gls)
2017–2020	Ivry	55	(8)
2020–2021	Bobigny	8	(1)
2021–2022	Sainte-Geneviève	30	(13)
2022–2024	Dunkerque	46	(6)
2024–2025	Martigues	47	(5)
2025–2026	Valenciennes	28	(3)

International career^{‡}
2024–	Congo	2	(0)
- * Club domestic league appearances and goals as of 23 June 2026 ‡ National team caps and goals as of 15:24, 5 June 2024 (UTC)

Alain Mouya Ipiélé (born 20 August 1997) is a professional footballer who plays as a winger. Born in France, he plays for the Congo national team.

== Club career ==
Ipiélé is a youth product of Ivry since the age of 6, and began his senior career with them in 2017. He transferred to Bobigny on 21 June 2020. The following season, he moved to Sainte-Geneviève where he broke out with 13 goals and 6 assists in 30 matches. On 13 July 2022, he transferred to the Championnat National club Dunkerque signing his first professional contract and helped them earn promotion into the Ligue 2 after his first season with them.

On 31 January 2024, Ipiélé transferred to Martigues. On 7 June 2025, he signed for Valenciennes for two seasons.

== International career ==
Born in France, Ipiélé is of Congolese (Brazzaville) descent and holds both nationalities. He was called up to the Congo national team in August 2023 for 2023 Africa Cup of Nations qualification matches.
