= Édouard Butin =

French footballer (born 1988)

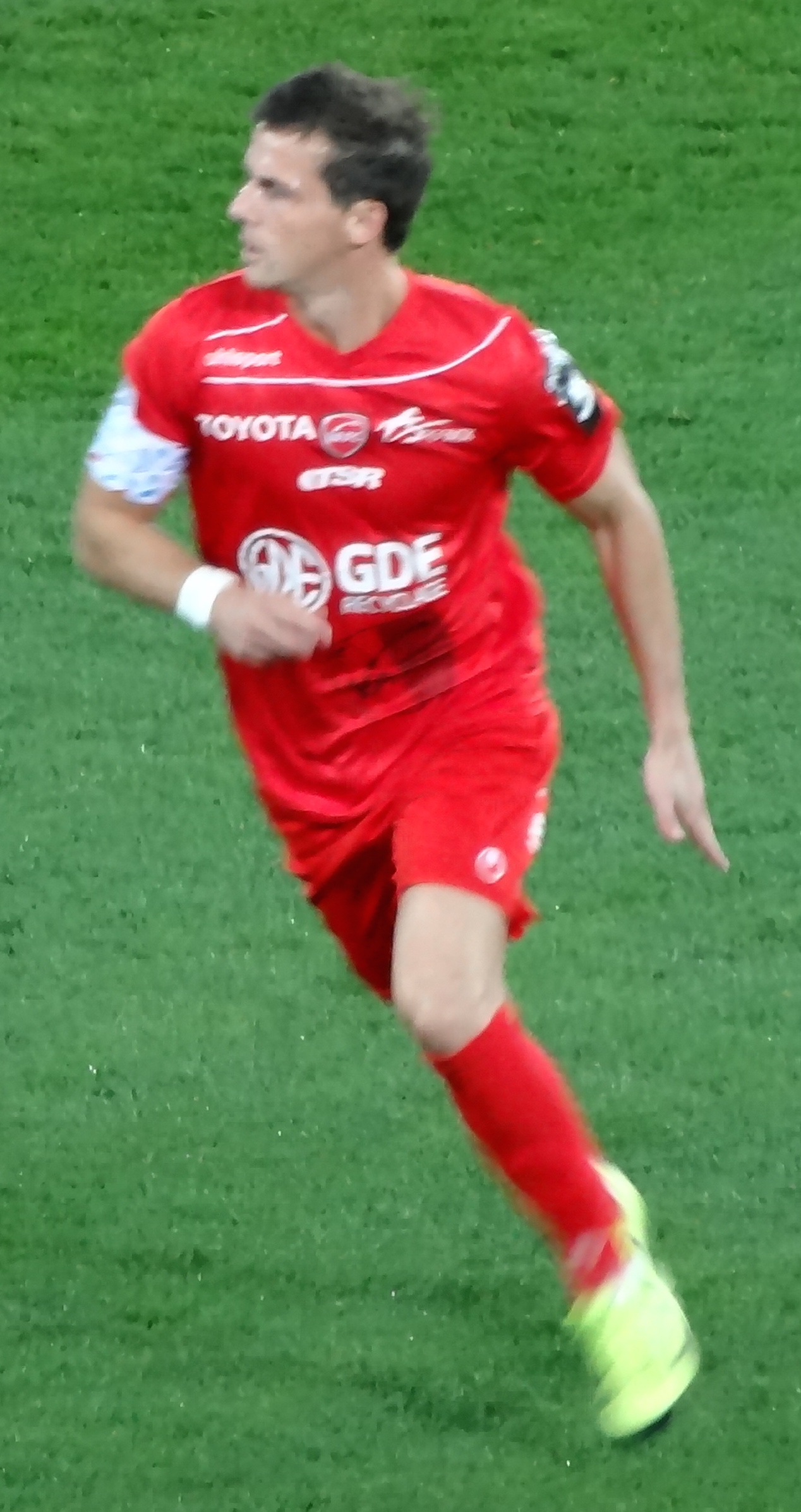

Personal information
- Date of birth: 13 June 1988 (age 38)
- Place of birth: Dole, France
- Height: 1.80 m (5 ft 11 in)
- Position: Striker

Youth career
- 1994–2001: CS Auxonne
- 2001–2004: Dijon
- 2004–2008: Sochaux

Senior career*
Years	Team	Apps	(Gls)
2008–2015	Sochaux	116	(17)
2008–2015	Sochaux II	16	(4)
2015–2017	Valenciennes	38	(6)
2015–2017	Valenciennes II	2	(0)
2017–2019	Brest	63	(9)
2019–2020	Orléans	5	(0)
2020–2021	Belfort	0	(0)

International career
2010	France U20	3	(2)
- * Club domestic league appearances and goals

Édouard Butin (born 13 June 1988) is a French professional footballer who plays as a striker.

== Career ==
Butin made his professional debut for FC Sochaux-Montbéliard on 14 September 2008 in a Ligue 1 game against Lille OSC. Butin is a France youth international.

In July 2017, Butin joined Stade Brestois 29. He left Brest at the end of the 2018–19 season, and after six months without a club he signed a six month contract with US Orléans in December 2019. He left at the end of the contract, and spent another six months without a club, until ASM Belfort signed him on a short term deal in December 2020, despite French amateur football being temporarily suspended due to COVID-19.

== Career statistics ==
As of 28 February 2020

Appearances and goals by club, season and competition
Club	Season	League			Cup		League Cup		Other		Total	
Club	Season	Division	Apps	Goals	Apps	Goals	Apps	Goals	Apps	Goals	Apps	Goals
Sochaux	2008–09	Ligue 1	1	0	0	0	0	0	0	0	1	0
Sochaux	2009–10	Ligue 1	22	1	2	0	1	0	0	0	25	1
Sochaux	2010–11	Ligue 1	18	2	0	0	1	0	0	0	19	2
Sochaux	2011–12	Ligue 1	25	6	1	0	1	0	1 (Note: Appearance in UEFA Europa League)	0	28	6
Sochaux	2012–13	Ligue 1	6	1	0	0	0	0	0	0	6	1
Sochaux	2013–14	Ligue 1	11	2	1	0	0	0	0	0	12	2
Sochaux	2014–15	Ligue 2	33	5	1	0	0	0	0	0	34	5
Sochaux	Total		116	17	5	0	3	0	1	0	125	17
Sochaux II	2010–11	CFA	6	3	0	0	0	0	0	0	6	3
Sochaux II	2012–13	CFA	3	0	0	0	0	0	0	0	3	0
Sochaux II	2013–14	CFA	6	1	0	0	0	0	0	0	6	1
Sochaux II	2014–15	CFA	1	0	0	0	0	0	0	0	1	0
Sochaux II	Total		16	4	0	0	0	0	0	0	16	4
Valenciennes	2015–16	Ligue 2	15	4	1	1	1	0	0	0	17	5
Valenciennes	2016–17	Ligue 2	23	2	0	0	0	0	0	0	23	2
Valenciennes	Total		38	6	1	1	1	0	0	0	40	7
Valenciennes II	2015–16	CFA 2	2	0	0	0	0	0	0	0	2	0
Brest	2017–18	Ligue 2	36	6	2	0	1	0	1	0	40	6
Brest	2018–19	Ligue 2	27	3	2	1	2	0	0	0	31	4
Brest	Total		63	9	4	1	3	0	1	0	71	10
Orléans	2019–20	Ligue 2	5	0	0	0	0	0	0	0	5	0
Career totals			240	36	10	2	7	0	2	0	259	38
