= Rémy Dugimont =

French footballer (born 1986)

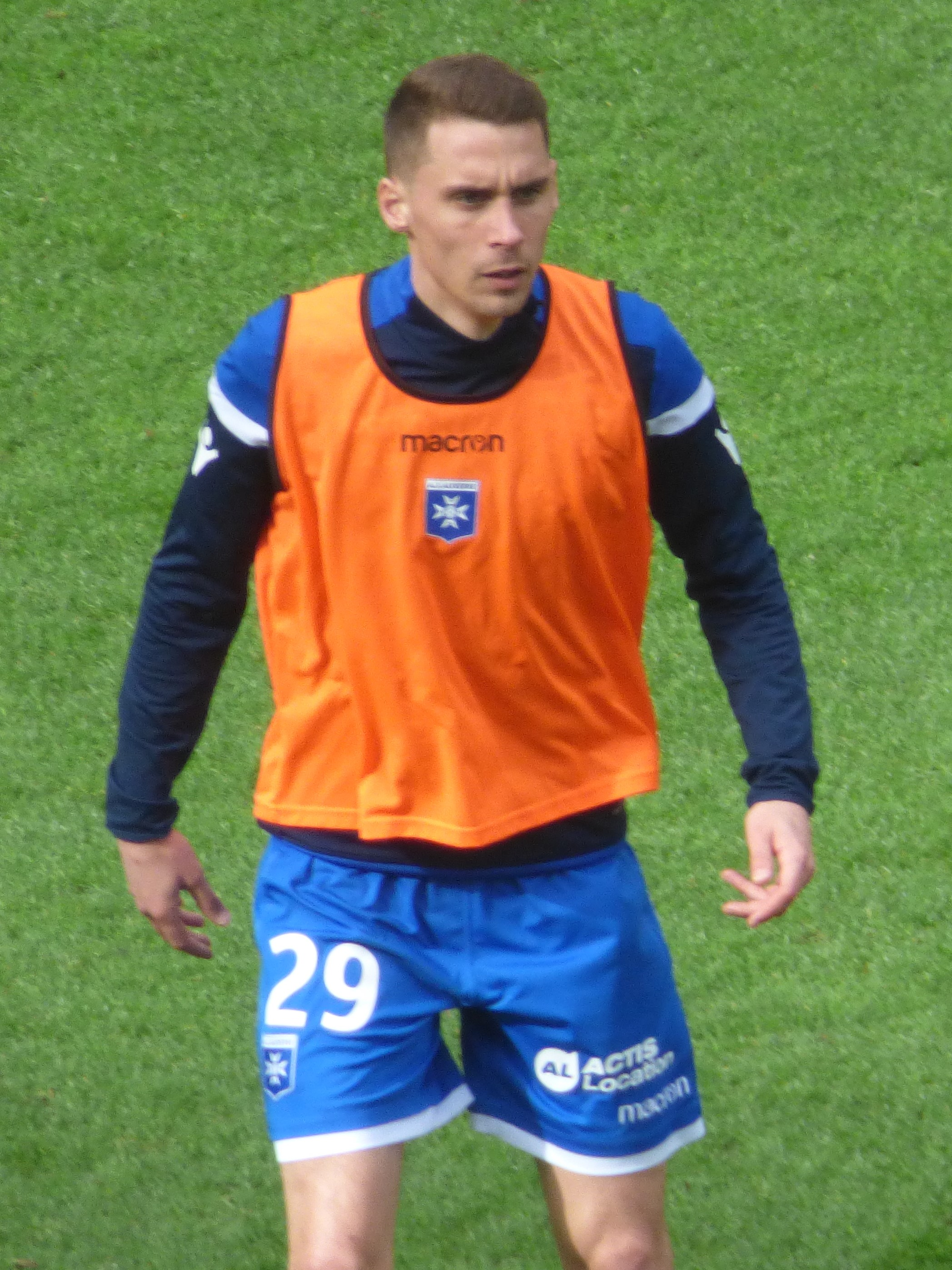
- Dugimont in 2019

Personal information
- Date of birth: 1 July 1986 (age 40)
- Place of birth: Saint-Cloud, France
- Height: 1.82 m (6 ft 0 in)
- Position: Striker

Team information
- Current team: Saint-Pierroise

Youth career
- 1993–1998: La Celle Saint-Cloud
- 1998–2001: Paris Saint-Germain
- 2001–2007: Le Chesney

Senior career*
Years	Team	Apps	(Gls)
2007–2008	Levallois	5	(3)
2008–2011	Poissy	62	(29)
2011–2013	Rouen	55	(23)
2013–2019	Clermont	167	(40)
2019–2023	Auxerre	124	(25)
2023–	Saint-Pierroise	0	(0)
- * Club domestic league appearances and goals as of 2 July 2023

Rémy Dugimont (born 1 July 1986) is a French professional footballer who plays as a striker for Réunion club Saint-Pierroise.

== Career ==
Born in Saint-Cloud, Dugimont began his career with professional club Paris Saint-Germain. After three years at the club, Dugimont signed with amateur club Le Chesnay and later joined Levallois SC. He spent one season at the club before joining Poissy in the Championnat de France amateur 2 helping the club earn promotion to the fourth division. During the 2010–11 season, Dugimont's amateur career was covered extensively through a blog by French newspaper and website L'Equipe and its sister site France Football.

Dugimont scored the winning penalty for AJ Auxerre in the 2022 Ligue 1 relegation playoffs against Saint-Étienne, earning the team promotion to Ligue 1 for the first time since 2012.

== Career statistics ==
As of 1 July 2021

Appearances and goals by club, season and competition
Club	Season	League			National cup (Note: Appearances in Coupe de France)		League cup (Note: Appearances in Coupe de la Ligue)		Total	
Club	Season	Division	Apps	Goals	Apps	Goals	Apps	Goals	Apps	Goals
Levallois	2006–07	CFA	4	1	0	0	0	0	4	1
Levallois	2007–08	CFA 2	1	2	0	0	0	0	1	2
Levallois	Total		5	3	0	0	0	0	5	3
Poissy	2008–09	CFA 2	6	5	1	0	0	0	7	5
Poissy	2009–10	CFA 2	24	8	3	3	0	0	27	11
Poissy	2010–11	CFA	32	16	6	4	0	0	38	20
Poissy	Total		62	29	10	7	0	0	72	36
Rouen	2011–12	National	20	11	1	0	0	0	21	11
Rouen	2012–13	National	35	12	5	5	0	0	40	17
Rouen	Total		55	23	6	5	0	0	61	28
Clermont Foot	2013–14	Ligue 2	30	1	1	0	2	1	33	2
Clermont Foot	2014–15	Ligue 2	27	8	2	1	2	1	31	10
Clermont Foot	2015–16	Ligue 2	37	7	2	3	1	0	40	10
Clermont Foot	2016–17	Ligue 2	36	13	3	3	1	0	40	16
Clermont Foot	2017–18	Ligue 2	35	11	1	0	2	2	38	13
Clermont Foot	2018–19	Ligue 2	2	0	0	0	0	0	2	0
Clermont Foot	Total		167	40	9	7	8	4	184	51
Auxerre	2018–19	Ligue 2	29	4	1	0	2	1	32	5
Auxerre	2019–20	Ligue 2	27	6	0	0	1	0	28	6
Auxerre	2020–21	Ligue 2	35	14	2	0	0	0	37	14
Auxerre	Total		91	24	3	0	3	1	97	25
Career total			380	119	28	19	11	5	419	143
