= Hamza Sakhi =

Moroccan footballer (born 1996)

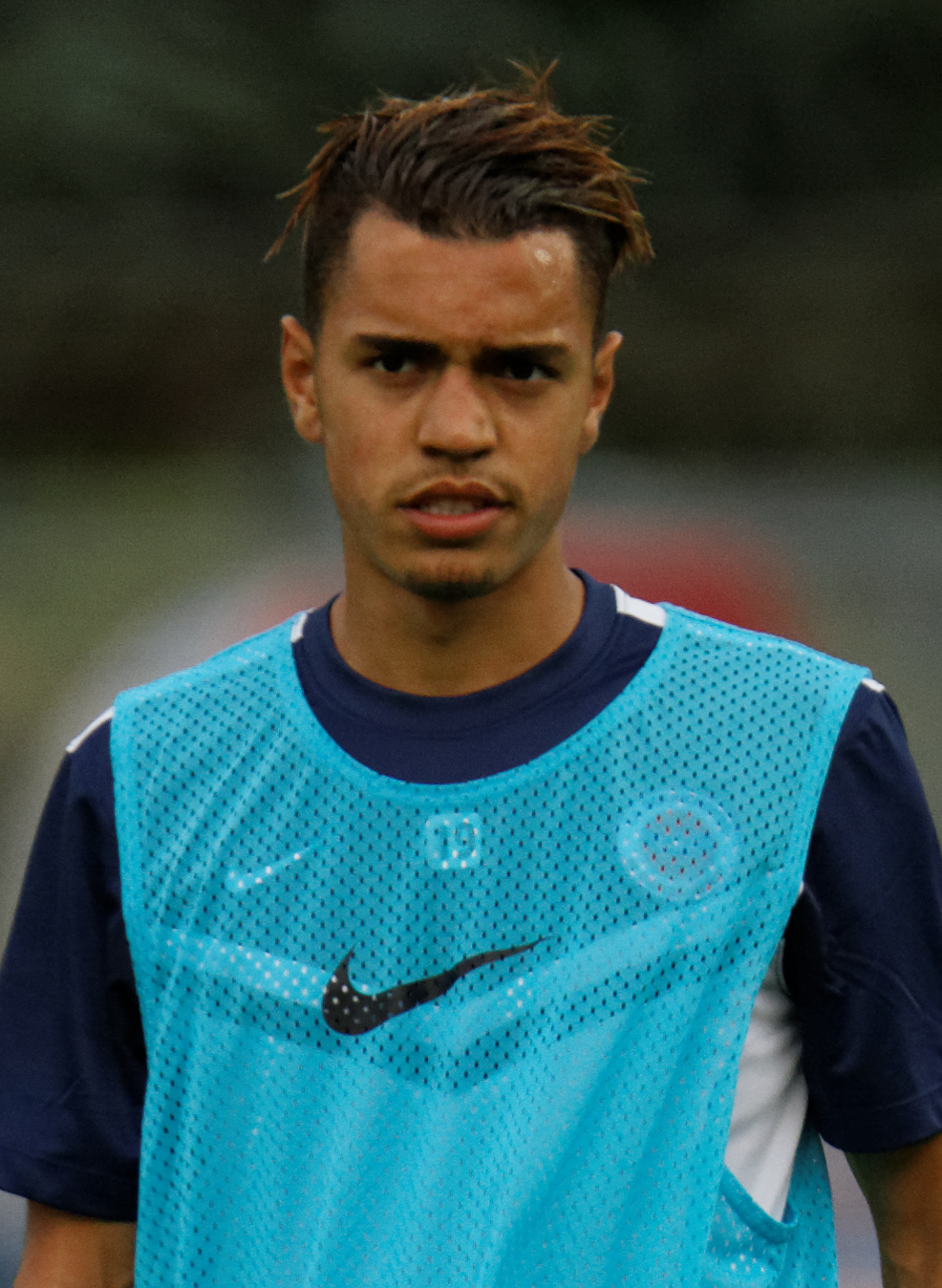
- Sakhi with Châteauroux in 2014

Personal information
- Date of birth: 7 June 1996 (age 30)
- Place of birth: Rabat, Morocco
- Height: 1.73 m (5 ft 8 in)
- Position: Attacking midfielder

Team information
- Current team: Meizhou Hakka
- Number: 24

Youth career
- –2013: Châteauroux

Senior career*
Years	Team	Apps	(Gls)
2013–2015	Châteauroux II	24	(3)
2014–2015	Châteauroux	25	(0)
2015–2018	Metz	3	(0)
2016	Metz II	4	(2)
2016–2017	→ SAS Épinal (loan)	28	(0)
2017–2018	→ Auxerre (loan)	35	(5)
2018–2024	Auxerre	125	(14)
2018–2020	Auxerre II	4	(1)
2019	→ Sochaux (loan)	15	(2)
2023–2024	→ Melbourne City (loan)	11	(1)
2024	Melbourne City	2	(0)
2024	Ajaccio	15	(1)
2024–2026	Wydad AC	25	(2)
2026–	Meizhou Hakka	0	(0)

International career
2013–2014	Morocco U17	9	(4)
- * Club domestic league appearances and goals as of 29 December 2024

Hamza Sakhi (born 7 June 1996) is a Moroccan professional footballer who plays for China League One club Meizhou Hakka as an attacking midfielder.

== Club career ==
Having initially joined AJ Auxerre from Metz on loan, Auxerre confirmed they had signed Sakhi on a permanent deal on 16 April 2018.

In January 2019, he went on loan to FC Sochaux-Montbéliard.

On 11 January 2024, Melbourne City made Sakhi's transfer permanent after he played for them on loan initially. A fortnight after signing this contract extension, Sakhi and the club agreed a mutual termination of his contract, due to family issues.

On 25 January 2024, Sakhi signed a 2.5-year contract with Ajaccio.

On 25 June 2026, Sakhi joined China League One club Meizhou Hakka.

== International career ==
Sakhi was born in Rabat, Morocco, but was raised in France. He made his debut for Morocco in a 4–2 2013 FIFA U-17 World Cup win against the Panama U17s, wherein he scored his debut goal.

== Personal life ==
His younger brother Ilyas Chouaref is also a footballer.

== Career statistics ==
As of match played 1 July 2021

Appearances and goals by club, season and competition
Club	Season	League			National cup		League cup		Continental		Total	
Club	Season	Division	Apps	Goals	Apps	Goals	Apps	Goals	Apps	Goals	Apps	Goals
Châteauroux II	2012–13	CFA 2	3	0	—		—		—		3	0
Châteauroux II	2013–14	CFA 2	14	2	—		—		—		14	2
Châteauroux II	2014–15	CFA 2	7	1	—		—		—		7	1
Châteauroux II	Total		24	3	0	0	0	0	0	0	24	3
Châteauroux	2014–15	Ligue 2	24	0	2	0	1	0	—		27	0
Châteauroux	2015–16	National	1	0	0	0	1	0	—		2	0
Châteauroux	Total		25	0	2	0	2	0	0	0	29	0
Metz	2015–16	Ligue 2	3	0	0	0	0	0	—		3	0
Metz II	2015–16	CFA 2	4	2	—		—		—		4	2
Épinal (loan)	2016–17	National	28	0	0	0	0	0	—		28	0
Auxerre (loan)	2017–18	Ligue 2	35	5	4	0	1	0	—		40	5
Auxerre	2018–19	Ligue 2	6	0	1	0	3	0	—		10	0
Auxerre	2019–20	Ligue 2	25	3	1	0	1	0	—		27	3
Auxerre	2020–21	Ligue 2	36	5	2	0	0	0	—		38	5
Auxerre	Total		67	8	4	0	4	0	0	0	75	8
Auxerre II	2018–19	National 3	3	1	—		—		—		3	1
Auxerre II	2019–20	National 3	1	0	—		—		—		1	0
Auxerre II	Total		4	1	0	0	0	0	0	0	4	1
Sochaux (loan)	2018–19	Ligue 2	15	2	0	0	0	0	—		15	2
Career total			305	21	10	0	7	0	0	0	222	21
