= Mathias Autret =

French footballer (born 1991)

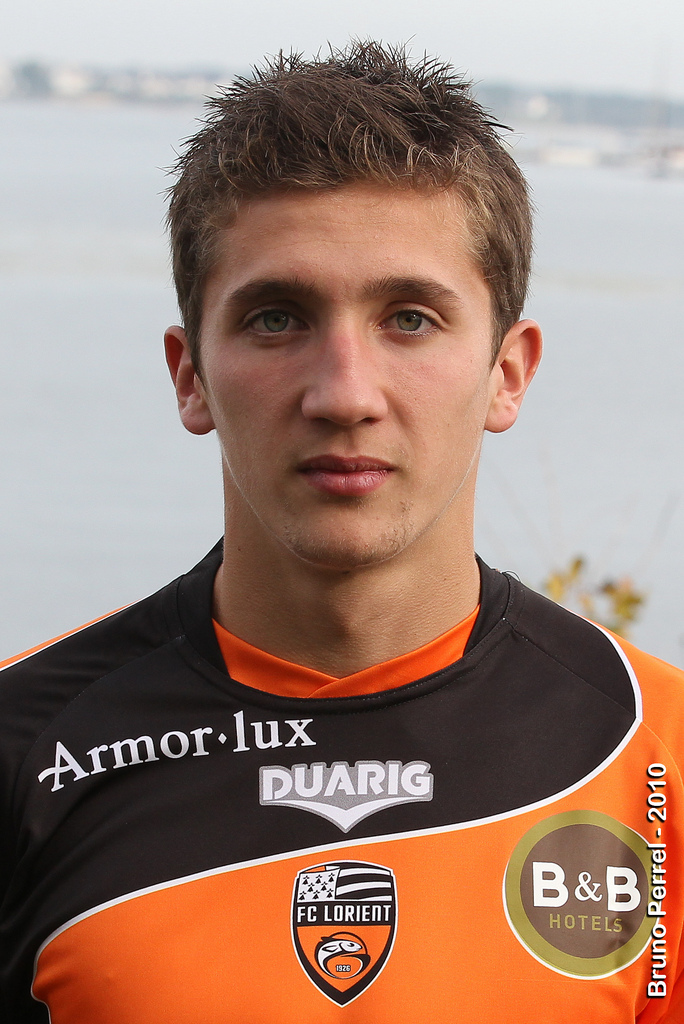
- Autret with Lorient in 2010

Personal information
- Date of birth: 1 March 1991 (age 35)
- Place of birth: Saint-Thégonnec, France
- Height: 1.79 m (5 ft 10 in)
- Position: Winger

Team information
- Current team: Saint-Pierre Milizac

Youth career
- 1997–2002: ES Saint-Thégonnec
- 2002: Guingamp
- 2003–2007: SC Morlaix
- 2007–2009: Brest

Senior career*
Years	Team	Apps	(Gls)
2009–2010	Brest	12	(3)
2010–2015	Lorient B	31	(5)
2011–2015	Lorient	60	(3)
2013–2014	→ Caen (loan)	30	(5)
2014	→ Caen B (loan)	3	(2)
2015–2017	Lens	70	(7)
2017–2020	Brest	93	(14)
2020–2023	Auxerre	101	(14)
2023–2025	Caen	44	(1)
2025–	Saint-Pierre Milizac	3	(0)

International career
2010	France U19	2	(0)
- * Club domestic league appearances and goals as of 4 October 2025

Mathias Autret (born 1 March 1991) is a French professional footballer who plays as a left winger for Championnat National 3 club Saint-Pierre Milizac. He is a former France youth international, having made two appearances for the under-19 team in 2010.

== Club career ==
On 15 May 2010, Autret agreed to a professional contract with Lorient. He signed a loan deal with Ligue 2 team Caen on 1 July 2013.

== Style of play ==
Autret is a prototypical number 10 possessing dribbling, and passing skills. His style of play has been compared to former Ligue 1 Player of the Year Éric Carrière and to Patrick Vieira.

== Career statistics ==
As of match played 13 November 2022

Appearances and goals by club, season and competition
Club	Season	League			National cup		League cup		Other		Total	
Club	Season	Division	Apps	Goals	Apps	Goals	Apps	Goals	Apps	Goals	Apps	Goals
Brest	2009–10	Ligue 2	12	3	2	0	0	0	—		14	3
Lorient B	2010–11	CFA	15	0	—		—		—		15	0
Lorient B	2011–12	CFA	3	1	—		—		—		3	1
Lorient B	2012–13	CFA	4	1	—		—		—		4	1
Lorient B	2014–15	CFA	9	3	—		—		—		9	3
Lorient B	Total		31	5	—		—		—		31	5
Lorient	2010–11	Ligue 1	7	0	2	1	0	0	—		9	1
Lorient	2011–12	Ligue 1	27	2	0	0	3	0	—		30	2
Lorient	2012–13	Ligue 1	19	0	3	1	1	0	—		23	1
Lorient	2013–14	Ligue 1	0	0	0	0	0	0	—		0	0
Lorient	2014–15	Ligue 1	7	1	1	0	1	0	—		9	1
Lorient	Total		60	3	6	2	5	0	—		71	5
Caen (loan)	2013–14	Ligue 2	30	5	2	1	2	0	—		34	6
Caen B (loan)	2013–14	CFA 2	3	2	—		—		—		3	2
Lens	2015–16	Ligue 2	38	5	0	0	1	0	—		39	5
Lens	2016–17	Ligue 2	32	2	3	0	2	0	—		37	2
Lens	Total		70	7	3	0	3	0	—		76	7
Brest	2017–18	Ligue 2	34	3	2	1	1	0	—		37	4
Brest	2018–19	Ligue 2	36	9	1	0	2	2	—		39	11
Brest	2019–20	Ligue 1	23	2	1	0	2	0	—		26	2
Brest	Total		93	14	4	1	5	2	—		102	17
Auxerre	2020–21	Ligue 2	34	6	2	0	—		—		36	6
Auxerre	2021–22	Ligue 2	34	6	2	0	—		3 (Note: One appearance in the Ligue 2 play-offs, two appearances in the Ligue 1 relegation/promotion play-offs)	0	39	6
Auxerre	2022–23	Ligue 1	13	2	0	0	—		—		13	2
Auxerre	Total		81	14	4	0	—		3	0	88	14
Career total			380	53	21	4	15	2	3	0	419	59
