= Kenji-Van Boto =

Malagasy footballer (born 1996)

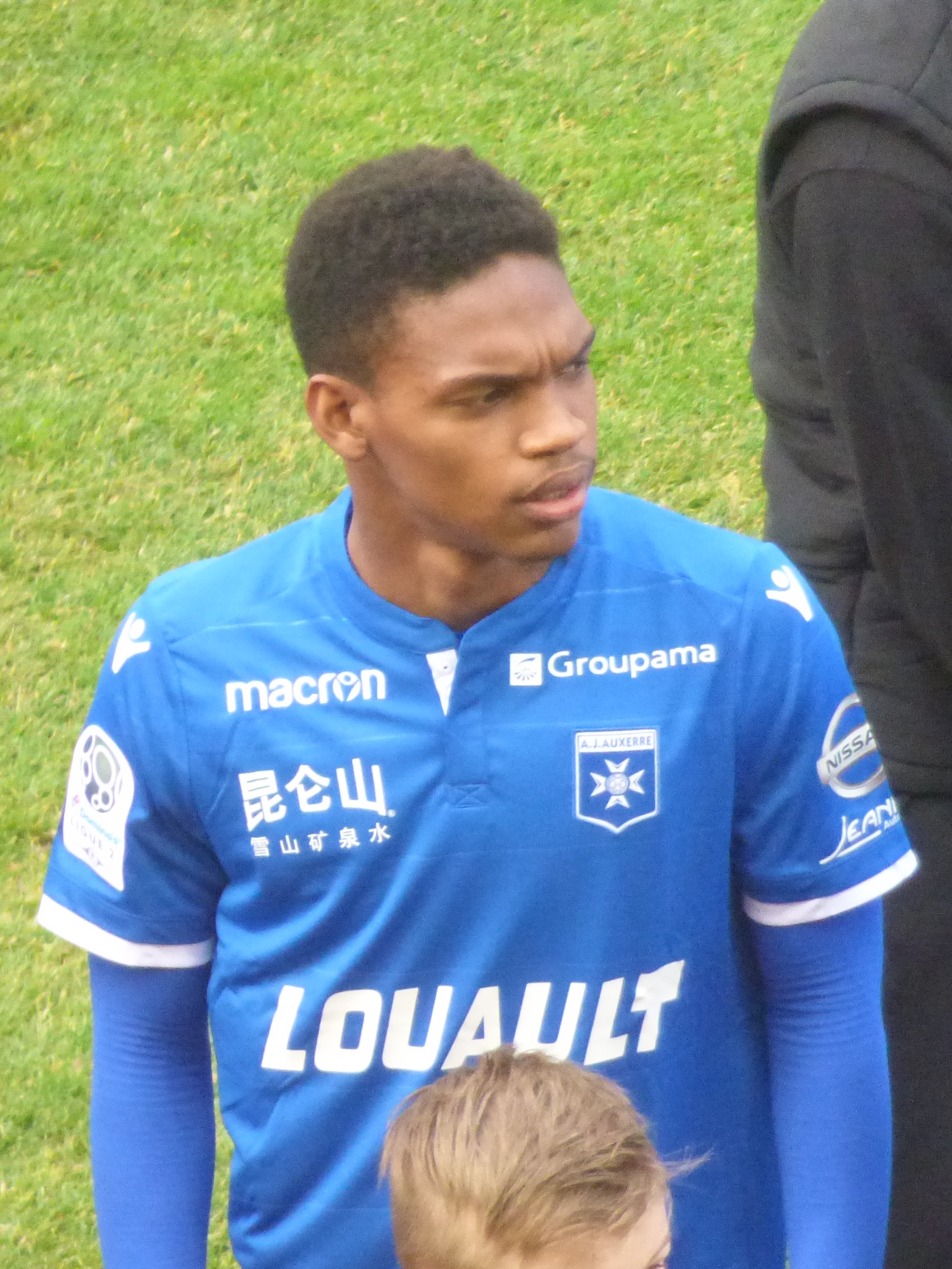
- Boto with Auxerre in 2019

Personal information
- Date of birth: 7 March 1996 (age 30)
- Place of birth: Saint-Denis, Réunion, France
- Height: 1.80 m (5 ft 11 in)
- Position: Defender

Team information
- Current team: Clermont
- Number: 97

Youth career
- 2004–2011: Saint-Denis F.C.
- 2011–2016: Auxerre

Senior career*
Years	Team	Apps	(Gls)
2014–2023	Auxerre II	81	(1)
2016–2023	Auxerre	78	(2)
2021–2022	→ Pau (loan)	36	(0)
2023–2025	Pau	28	(0)
2024–2025	Pau II	10	(0)
2025–	Clermont	10	(0)

International career^{‡}
2011–2012	France U16	3	(0)
2022–	Madagascar	1	(0)
- * Club domestic league appearances and goals as of 2 December 2025 ‡ National team caps and goals as of 23:38, 3 October 2022 (UTC)

Kenji-Van Boto (born 7 March 1996) is a professional footballer who plays who plays as a defender for Ligue 2 club Clermont. Born in France, he plays for the Madagascar national team.

== Club career ==
Boto began his senior career with Auxerre's reserves in 2014, before promoting to their senior team in 2016. On 17 June 2021, he joined Pau FC on loan.

On 7 July 2025, Boto signed a two-season contract with Clermont.

== International career ==
Boto was born in France and is of Malagasy descent. He is a former youth international with the France U16s. He was called up to the Madagascar national team for a set of friendlies in September 2022. He debuted in a 3–3 friendly tie with Congo on 24 September 2022.

== Career statistics ==
As of 1 July 2021

Appearances and goals by club, season and competition
Club	Season	League			Coupe de France		Coupe de la Ligue		Total	
Club	Season	Division	Apps	Goals	Apps	Goals	Apps	Goals	Apps	Goals
Auxerre	2014–15	Ligue 2	0	0	0	0	1	0	1	0
Auxerre	2015–16	Ligue 2	0	0	0	0	0	0	0	0
Auxerre	2016–17	Ligue 2	18	0	3	1	2	0	23	1
Auxerre	2017–18	Ligue 2	8	0	2	0	0	0	10	0
Auxerre	2018–19	Ligue 2	31	2	1	0	2	0	34	2
Auxerre	2019–20	Ligue 2	7	0	2	0	0	0	9	0
Auxerre	2020–21	Ligue 2	12	0	2	0	0	0	14	0
Career total			76	2	10	1	5	0	91	3
