= Samuel Koeberle =

French footballer (born 2004)

Personal information
- Date of birth: 26 November 2004 (age 21)
- Place of birth: Reims, France
- Position: Midfielder

Team information
- Current team: Vukovar 1991

Youth career
- 2010–2013: Tinqueux
- 2013–2017: Reims
- 2017–2018: Reims Sainte-Anne
- 2018–2021: Reims

Senior career*
Years	Team	Apps	(Gls)
2021–2025	Reims II	17	(0)
2022–2025	Reims	1	(0)
2025–	Vukovar 1991	0	(0)

International career^{‡}
2021–2022	France U18	3	(0)
- * Club domestic league appearances and goals as of 17:00, 1 May 2022 (UTC) ‡ National team caps and goals as of 17:00, 1 May 2022 (UTC)

Samuel Koeberle (born 26 November 2004) is a French professional footballer who plays as a midfielder for HNL club Vukovar 1991.

== Club career ==
Koeberle is a youth product of the academy of Stade de Reims, and was promoted to their reserves for the 2021-22 season. He made his professional debut with the senior Reims team in a 2–1 Ligue 1 win over FC Lorient on 1 May 2022.

== International career ==
Koeberle is a youth international for France, having been called up to the France U18s in 2021.

== Personal life ==
Koeberle's father, Patrick, was also a professional footballer who also played for Reims.
