= Migennes =

- Commune
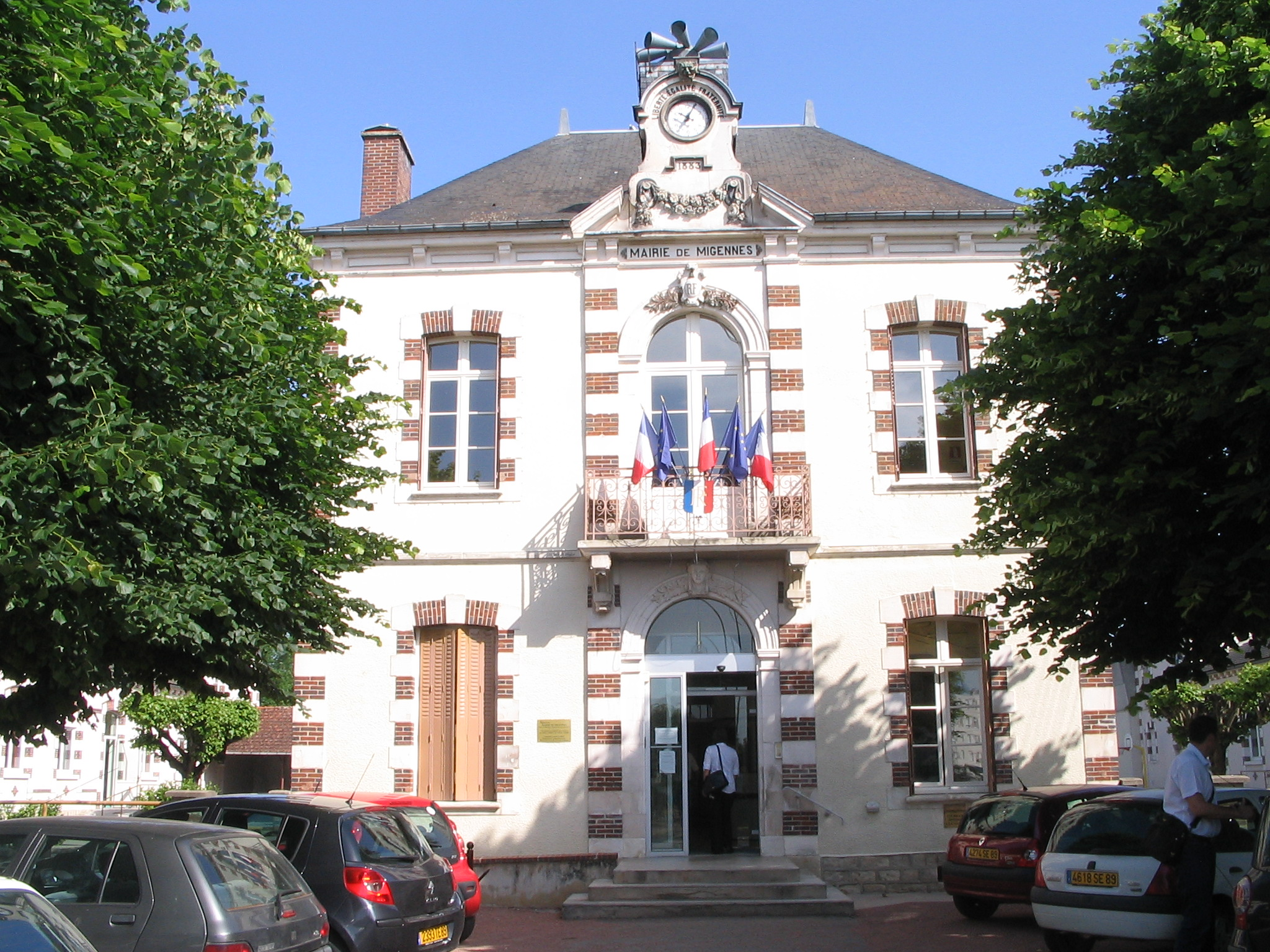
- The town hall in Migennes

- Coat of arms
- Location of Migennes
- Location within France Location within Bourgogne-Franche-Comté
- Coordinates: 47°57′56″N 3°31′03″E
- Country: France
- Region: Bourgogne-Franche-Comté
- Department: Yonne
- Arrondissement: Auxerre
- Canton: Migennes

Government
  - Mayor (2020–2026): François Boucher
- Area^{1}: 16.58 km^{2} (6.40 sq mi)
- Highest elevation: 152 m (499 ft)
- Lowest elevation: 80 m (260 ft)
- Population (2023): 6,688
  - Density: 403.4/km^{2} (1,045/sq mi)
- Time zone: UTC+01:00 (CET)
  - Summer (DST): UTC+02:00 (CEST)
- INSEE/Postal code: 89257 /89400
- ^{1} French Land Register data, which excludes lakes, ponds, glaciers > 1 km^{2} (0.386 sq mi or 247 acres) and river estuaries.

Migennes (French pronunciation: [miʒɛn]) is a commune in the Yonne department in Bourgogne-Franche-Comté in north-central France. Laroche-Migennes station has rail connections to Dijon, Paris, Auxerre, Corbigny and Avallon.

== Population ==
Historical population
Year	Pop.	±% p.a.
1968	7,645	—
1975	8,315	+1.21%
1982	8,145	−0.29%
1990	8,235	+0.14%
1999	8,165	−0.09%
2007	7,373	−1.27%
2012	7,008	−1.01%
2017	7,240	+0.65%
2023	6,688	−1.31%
Source: INSEE

== Town partnership ==
- Simmern, Rhineland-Palatinate, Germany

== See also ==
- Canal de Bourgogne
- Communes of the Yonne department
