= Ousoumane Camara =

French footballer

Personal information
- Date of birth: 19 December 1998 (age 27)
- Place of birth: Pontoise, France
- Height: 1.83 m (6 ft 0 in)
- Position: Midfielder

Team information
- Current team: Auxerre II

Youth career
- 2009–2011: Cergy Pontoise
- 2011–2016: Auxerre

Senior career*
Years	Team	Apps	(Gls)
2016–	Auxerre II	100	(15)
2020–	Auxerre	5	(0)
- * Club domestic league appearances and goals as of 2 December 2023

Ousoumane Camara (born 30 May 1996) is a French professional footballer who plays for Championnat National 3 side Auxerre II as a midfielder.

== Career ==
On 5 May 2019, Camara signed his first professional contract with Auxerre. He made his professional debut with Auxerre in a 2–0 Ligue 2 loss to on Sochaux on 22 August 2020.

== Personal life ==
Born in France, Camara is of Guinean descent.
